= New Zealand at the 1974 British Commonwealth Games =

- CG code: NZL
- CGA: New Zealand Olympic and British Commonwealth Games Association
- Website: www.olympic.org.nz

in Christchurch, New Zealand
- Competitors: 142
- Flag bearers: Opening: Warwick Nicholl; Closing:
- Officials: 33
- Medals Ranked 4th: Gold 9 Silver 8 Bronze 18 Total 35

British Commonwealth Games appearances
- 1930; 1934; 1938; 1950; 1954; 1958; 1962; 1966; 1970; 1974; 1978; 1982; 1986; 1990; 1994; 1998; 2002; 2006; 2010; 2014; 2018; 2022; 2026; 2030

New Zealand at the 1974 British Commonwealth Games was represented by a team of 142 competitors and 33 officials. Selection of the team for the Games in Christchurch, New Zealand, was the responsibility of the New Zealand Olympic and British Commonwealth Games Association. New Zealand's flagbearer at the opening ceremony was field athlete Warwick Nicholl. The New Zealand team finished fourth on the medal table, winning a total of 35 medals, nine of which were gold.

New Zealand has competed in every games, starting with the British Empire Games in 1930 at Hamilton, Ontario.

== Medal tables ==
New Zealand was fourth on the medal table in 1974, with a total of 35 medals, including nine gold.

Medal	Name	Sport	Event
Gold	Dick Tayler	Athletics	Men's 10,000 m
Gold	Robin Tait	Athletics	Men's discus throw
Gold	David Baldwin; Kerry Clark; John Somerville; Gordon Jolly	Lawn bowls	Men's fours
Gold	Maurie Gordon	Shooting	Open full-bore rifle
Gold	Jaynie Parkhouse	Swimming	Women's 800 m freestyle
Gold	Mark Treffers	Swimming	Men's 400 m individual medley
Gold	Tony Ebert	Weightlifting	Men's middleweight
Gold	Graham May	Weightlifting	Men's super heavyweight
Gold	David Aspin	Wrestling	Men's middleweight
Silver	John Walker	Athletics	Men's 1500 m
Silver	Valerie Young	Athletics	Women's shot put
Silver	Jack Foster	Athletics	Men's marathon
Silver	Sue Haden	Athletics	Women's 800 m
Silver	William Byrne	Boxing	Men's light heavyweight
Silver	Mark Treffers	Swimming	Men's 1500 m freestyle
Silver	Brian Marsden	Weightlifting	Men's middle heavyweight
Silver	John Bolton	Weightlifting	Men's heavyweight
Bronze	Bevan Smith	Athletics	Men's 200 m
Bronze	John Walker	Athletics	Men's 800 m
Bronze	Robert Colley	Boxing	Men's lightweight
Bronze	Lance Revill	Boxing	Men's light middleweight
Bronze	Les Rackley	Boxing	Men's middleweight
Bronze	Bob McDonald; Phil Skoglund	Lawn bowls	Men's pairs
Bronze	Philip Harland; Paul Medhurst	Cycling	Men's tandem sprint
Bronze	Paul Brydon; Russell Nant; Blair Stockwell; René Heyde	Cycling	Men's team pursuit
Bronze	Bruce McMillan	Shooting	Open rapid-fire pistol
Bronze	John Coutts	Swimming	Men's 200 m butterfly
Bronze	Susan Hunter	Swimming	Women's 200 m individual medley
Bronze	Susan Hunter	Swimming	Women's 400 m individual medley
Bronze	Jaynie Parkhouse	Swimming	Women's 400 m freestyle
Bronze	Brian Duffy	Weightlifting	Men's featherweight
Bronze	Bruce Cameron	Weightlifting	Men's lightweight
Bronze	Rory Barrett	Weightlifting	Men's heavyweight
Bronze	Gordon Mackay	Wrestling	Men's welterweight
Bronze	Gary Knight	Wrestling	Men's super heavyweight

Medals by sport
Sport	Gold medal	Silver medal	Bronze medal	Total
Athletics	2	4	2	8
Weightlifting	2	2	3	7
Swimming	2	1	4	7
Wrestling	1	0	2	3
Lawn bowls	1	0	1	2
Shooting	1	0	1	2
Boxing	0	1	3	4
Cycling	0	0	2	2
Total	9	8	18	35

Medals by gender
Gender	Gold medal	Silver medal	Bronze medal	Total
Male	7	6	14	27
Female	1	2	3	6
Mixed / open	1	0	1	2
Total	9	8	18	35

== Competitors ==
The following table lists the number of New Zealand competitors participating at the Games according to gender and sport.

Sport	Men	Women	Total
Athletics	36	23	59
Badminton	4	5	9
Boxing	9	—N/a	9
Cycling	11	—N/a	11
Diving	1	3	4
Lawn bowls	7	—N/a	7
Shooting	10	0	10
Swimming	8	8	16
Weightlifting	9	—N/a	9
Wrestling	8	—N/a	8
Total	103	39	142

New Zealanders Jane and Rebecca Perrott swam for Fiji at the games, as their father was Registrar at the University of the South Pacific. At 12½ years, Rebecca was the youngest competitor at the games.

== Athletics ==
=== Track and road ===
Athlete	Event	Heat		Semifinal		Final	
Athlete	Event	Result	Rank (Note: Ranks given are within the heat)	Result	Rank (Note: Ranks given are within the semifinal)	Result	Rank
Grant Anderson	Men's 100 m	11.13	6	did not advance			
Grant Anderson	Men's 200 m	21.95	4	did not advance			
Wendy Brown	Women's 100 m	11.6	3 Q	11.6	3 Q	11.59	5
Wendy Brown	Women's 200 m	23.8	3 Q	23.8	3 Q	23.44	6
Trevor Cochrane	Men's 100 m	10.86	6	did not advance			
Trevor Cochrane	Men's 200 m	21.68	4	did not advance			
Rod Dixon	Men's 1500 m	3:44.6	3 Q	—N/a		3:33.89	4
Richard Endean	Men's 400 m	47.94	5	did not advance			
Jack Foster	Men's marathon	—N/a				2:11:18.6	2nd place, silver medalist(s)
Anne Garrett	Women's 1500 m	4:19.1	4 Q	—N/a		4:21.05	6
Alan Gilmour	Men's 800 m	1:51.3	4 Q	1:57.78	8	did not advance	
Sue Haden	Women's 800 m	2:06.0	1 Q	2:04.9	2 Q	2:02.04	2nd place, silver medalist(s)
Sue Haden	Women's 1500 m	4:26.8	2 Q	—N/a		4:27.8	10
Sue Gukilau	Women's 400 m	55.3	3 Q	55.76	7	did not advance	
Howard Healey	Men's 3000 m steeplechase	—N/a				8:52.4	11
Nathan Healey	Men's 3000 m steeplechase	—N/a				8:52.2	10
Kerry Hill	Men's 100 m	10.85	7	did not advance			
Penny Hunt	Women's 400 m	55.2	2 Q	55.0	3 Q	54.30	7
Roger Johnson	Men's 400 m hurdles	52.9	3 Q	52.45	5	did not advance	
Philip Kear	Men's 400 m	47.7	2 Q	47.13	8	did not advance	
Jan Lothian	Women's 100 m hurdles	14.0	2 Q	14.26	5	did not advance	
Terry Manners	Men's marathon	—N/a				2:12:58.6	4
Brenda Matthews	Women's 100 m hurdles	13.7	1 Q	13.9	3 Q	13.95	7
Rendell McIntosh	Men's 400 m hurdles	53.1	5 Q	51.95	6	did not advance	
Stuart Melville	Men's 800 m	1:52.11	5	did not advance			
Michelle Miles	Women's 100 m hurdles	14.1	4 Q	13.9	4 Q	13.89	5
Colleen Mills	Women's 400 m	57.54	5	did not advance			
Phillip Mills	Men's 110 m hurdles	14.51	6	—N/a		did not advance	
Lorraine Moller	Women's 800 m	2:05.8	1 Q	2:04.2	3 Q	2:03.63	5
Tony Polhill	Men's 1500 m	3:40.30	4 Q	—N/a		DNS	
Sylvia Potts	Women's 1500 m	4:19.6	2 Q	—N/a		4:23.12	8
Ross Pownall	Men's 110 m hurdles	14.35	5	—N/a		did not advance	
Euan Robertson	Men's 3000 m steeplechase	—N/a				8:35.2	5
Kim Robertson	Women's 100 m	12.06	4	did not advance			
Kim Robertson	Women's 200 m	24.56	5	did not advance			
John Robinson	Men's marathon	—N/a				2:17:05.4	10
Bryan Rose	Men's 5000 m	13:57.2	6 Q	—N/a		14:00.93	10
Kevin Ryan	Men's 5000 m	14:07.42	7	—N/a		did not advance	
Kevin Ryan	Men's 10,000 m	—N/a				29:50.0	12
Bevan Smith	Men's 200 m	20.9	1 Q	21.2	3 Q	21.08	3rd place, bronze medalist(s)
Bevan Smith	Men's 400 m	47.2	2 Q	46.50	2 Q	46.60	6
Shirley Somervell	Women's 800 m	2:04.6	2 Q	2:05.2	3 Q	2:05.83	7
Les Stevenson	Men's 20 miles walk	—N/a				2:46:56.2	6
Dick Tayler	Men's 5000 m	DNS		—N/a		did not advance	
Dick Tayler	Men's 10,000 m	—N/a				27:46.4	1st place, gold medalist(s)
Kevin Taylor	Men's 20 miles walk	—N/a				DQ	
John Walker	Men's 800 m	1:47.8	1 Q	1:46.2	2 Q	1:44.92	3rd place, bronze medalist(s)
John Walker	Men's 1500 m	3:42.5	1 Q	—N/a		3:32.52	2nd place, silver medalist(s)
Philip Watson	Men's 10,000 m	—N/a				29:54.8	13
Gail Wooten	Women's 100 m	11.9	4 q	11.88	6	did not advance	
Gail Wooten	Women's 200 m	24.0	3 Q	24.01	5	did not advance	
Bevan Smith; Grant Anderson; Kerry Hill; Trevor Cochrane	Men's 4 × 100 m relay	40.5	4 q	—N/a		40.41	7
Bevan Smith; Philip Kear; Richard Endean; Trevor Cochrane	Men's 4 × 400 m relay	—N/a				3:08.01	5
Brenda Matthews; Gail Wooten; Kim Robertson; Wendy Brown	Women's 4 × 100 m relay	45.3	2 Q	—N/a		44.68	5
Lorraine Tong; Penny Hunt; Shirley Somervell; Sue Gukilau	Women's 4 × 400 m relay	—N/a				3:37.5	5

=== Field ===
Athlete	Event	Qualifying		Final	
Athlete	Event	Result	Rank	Result	Rank
Susan Burnside	Women's high jump	—N/a		1.55 m	14
Susan Burnside	Women's long jump	6.02 m	Q	5.58 m	11
Murray Cheater	Men's hammer throw	—N/a		65.82 m	5
Tuariki Delamere	Men's long jump	7.53 m	Q	7.31 m	9
Tuariki Delamere	Men's triple jump	—N/a		14.23 m	13
Pamela Hendren	Women's long jump	6.37 m	Q	6.11 m	9
Kerry Hill	Men's long jump	7.30 m	Q	7.18 m	10
Sandra McGookin	Women's javelin throw	—N/a		47.84 m	6
Sally Mene	Women's discus throw	47.10 m	Q	48.80 m	7
Sally Mene	Women's javelin throw	—N/a		40.44 m	11
Donna Mills	Women's high jump	—N/a		1.60 m	12
Warwick Nicholl	Men's hammer throw	—N/a		63.72 m	7
Dave Norris	Men's triple jump	—N/a		15.41 m	6
Kathy Otto	Women's long jump	5.65 m	14	did not progress	
Barbara Poulsen	Women's shot put	14.90 m	Q	14.60 m	5
Robin Tait	Men's discus throw	—N/a		63.08 m	1st place, gold medalist(s)
Robin Tait	Men's shot put	—N/a		17.71 m	5
Peter Tracy	Men's pole vault	—N/a		4.60 m	5
Valerie Young	Women's shot put	14.83 m	Q	15.29 m	2nd place, silver medalist(s)

=== Combined ===
Men's decathlon

Athlete	100 m	Long jump	Shot put	High jump	400 m	110 m hurdles	Discus throw	Pole vault	Javelin throw	1500 m	Overall points	Rank
Mene Mene	11.21; 754 pts	6.81 m 780 pts	14.22 m 741 pts	1.85 m 725 pts	50.9; 766 pts	15.78	39.82 m 682 pts	3.30 m 615 pts	57.64 m 732 pts	4:56.2; 429 pts	6993 pts	6
Roger Main	11.27; 740 pts	6.78 m 774 pts	13.97 m 725 pts	1.76 m 643 pts	50.3; 792 pts		38.76 m 661 pts	3.70 m 728 pts	47.96 m 605 pts	5:21.7; 298 pts	6799 pts	7
Geoffrey Wood	11.79; 624 pts	6.38 m 695 pts	13.34 m 685 pts	1.73 m 616 pts	51.1; 758 pts	16.90	39.86 m 683 pts	3.20 m 587 pts	52.10 m 661 pts	4:31.1; 582 pts	6622 pts	9

Women's pentathlon

Athlete	100 m hurdles	Shot put	High jump	Long jump	200 m	Overall points	Rank
Susan Burnside	15.05; 743 pts			6.02 m 910 pts		3726 pts	11
Barbara Poulsen	14.41; 816 pts	14.82 m 885 pts				4158 pts	5

== Badminton ==
Athlete	Event	Round of 64	Round of 32	Round of 16	Quarterfinal	Semifinal	Final / BM	Rank
Athlete	Event	Opposition Result	Opposition Result	Opposition Result	Opposition Result	Opposition Result	Opposition Result	Rank
Alison Branfield	Women's singles	—N/a	Hin-Clair (MRI); W 11–0 11–0	Terry (AUS); L 3–11 6–11	did not advance			
Robin Denton	Women's singles	—N/a	Whetnall (ENG); L 12–10 1–11 6–11	did not advance				
Frances Erceg	Women's singles	—N/a	Youngberg (CAN); L 8–11 11–5 3–11	did not advance				
Warren Johns	Men's singles	Bye	Cooper (AUS); W 5–15 15–7 15–7	Talbot (ENG); L 1–15 12–15	did not advance			
Ross Livingston	Men's singles	Ahuja (IND); W 15–10 14–17 18–15	Jobanputra (TAN); W 15–3 15–3	Stuart (ENG); W 15–9 15–3	Gunalan (MAS); L 7–15 8–15	did not advance		
Bryan Purser	Men's singles	Ansari (SCO); W 15–4 15–6	Chiplunkar (TAN); W 15–0 15–3	Tan (MAS); L 4–15 3–15	did not advance			
Richard Purser	Men's singles	Bye	Tredgett (ENG); W 15–12 12–15 15–5	Moo (MAS); W 15–6 15–10	Paulson (CAN); L 15–6 10–15 9–15	did not advance		
Gaynor Weatherley	Women's singles	—N/a	Bye	Jones (AUS); L 3–11 3–11	did not advance			
Warren Johns; Ross Livingston	Men's doubles	—N/a	Clancy / Tyrrell (AUS); W 17–14 15–11	Macdonnell / McKee (CAN); W 15–8 15–5	Stevens / Tredgett (ENG); L 3–15 9–15	did not advance		
Bryan Purser; Richard Purser	Men's doubles	—N/a	Bye	Stuart / Talbot (ENG); L 10–15 4–15	did not advance			
Frances Erceg; Glenys Waller	Women's doubles	—N/a		Bye	Boxall / Whetnall (ENG); L 1–15 6–15	did not advance		
Alison Branfield; Robin Denton	Women's doubles	—N/a		Terry / Jones (AUS); W 15–8 15–6	Ang / Ng (MAS); L 12–15 4–15	did not advance		
Alison Branfield; Richard Purser	Mixed doubles	—N/a	Jones / Cooper (AUS); W 13–15 15–6 15–2	Boxall / Tredgett (ENG); W 14–17 15–12 15–14	Stewart / Gow (SCO); W 15–13 15–7	Gilks / Talbot (ENG); L 1–15 12–15	Whetnall / Stuart (ENG); L 10–15 4–15	4
Robin Denton; Bryan Purser	Mixed doubles	—N/a	Ang / Moo (MAS); W 15–5 17–14	L	did not advance			
Glenys Waller; Warren Johns	Mixed doubles	—N/a	Flockhart / McCoig (SCO); L 11–15 5–15	did not advance				
Gaynor Weatherley; Ross Livingston	Mixed doubles	—N/a	Kelly / Ansari (SCO); L 10–15 15–18	did not advance				

== Boxing ==
Athlete	Event	Round of 32	Round of 16	Quarterfinal	Semifinal	Final	Rank
Athlete	Event	Opposition Result	Opposition Result	Opposition Result	Opposition Result	Opposition Result	Rank
Warren Karaitiana	Bantamweight	—N/a	Uilata (SAM); L	did not advance			
Derek Wilson	Featherweight	—N/a	Mbugua (KEN); L	did not advance			
Robert Colley	Lightweight	—N/a	Rima (COK); W	Moepi (LES); W	Kalule (UGA); L	Did not advance	3rd place, bronze medalist(s)
David Jackson	Light welterweight	Bye	Lui (TGA); W	Martey (GHA); L	did not advance		
Ronald Jackson	Welterweight	—N/a	Taefu (SAM); W	Cooney (SCO); L	did not advance		
Lance Revill	Light middleweight	—N/a	Langol (UGA); W	Vaili (SAM); W	Harrison (SCO); L	Did not advance	3rd place, bronze medalist(s)
Les Rackley	Middleweight	—N/a	Bye	Wasaija (UGA); W	Luipa (ZAM); L	Did not advance	3rd place, bronze medalist(s)
William Byrne	Light heavyweight	—N/a	Bye	Thompson (PNG); W	Ikhouria (NIG); W	Knight (ENG); L	2nd place, silver medalist(s)
Fisi Brown	Heavyweight	—N/a	Onyango (KEN); W	Masanda (UGA); L	did not advance		

== Cycling ==
=== Road ===
Men's road race

Athlete	Time	Rank
Garry Bell	5:18:26	5
Vern Hanaray	5:17:28	4

=== Track ===
Men's 1000 m sprint

Athlete	Round 1	First-round repechages				Round 2	Second-round repechage	Round 3	Third-round repechages		Quarterfinals	Semifinals	Final / BM	
Athlete	Round 1	Round 1	Round 2	Round 3	Round 4	Round 2	Second-round repechage	Round 3	Round 1	Round 2	Quarterfinals	Semifinals	Final / BM	
Athlete	Opposition Result	Opposition Result	Opposition Result	Opposition Result	Opposition Result	Opposition Result	Opposition Result	Opposition Result	Opposition Result	Opposition Result	Opposition Result	Opposition Result	Opposition Result	Rank
John Dean	Atherly (TTO); L	Progressed via repechages				Barnes (AUS); L	L	did not advance						
Paul Medhurst	Ibrahim (MAS); W 12.16	Bye				Mirander (JAM); L	W	Crutchlow (ENG); L	Atherly (TTO); Cooke (ENG); L	Luces (TTO); Cooke (ENG); W 11.82	Nicholson (AUS); L, L	did not advance		5
Bryce Preston	Hatfield (WAL); W 12.33	Bye				Cooke (ENG); W 12.48	Bye	Luces (TTO); W 12.36	Bye		Mirander (JAM); L, L	did not advance		7

Men's tandem 2000 m sprint

Athletes	Qualification		Semifinals	Final / BM	
Athletes	Time	Rank	Opposition Result	Opposition Result	Rank
Philip Harland; Paul Medhurst	11.10	3 Q	Rush / O'Neill (AUS); L, W 11.95, L	Hatfield / Tudor (WAL); W 11.12, W 11.58	3rd place, bronze medalist(s)

Men's 1 km time trial

Athlete	Time	Rank
John Dean	1:14.22	10
René Heyde	1:12.16	4
Jacob Schriek	1:12.81	6

Men's 4000 m pursuit

Athlete	Event	Qualification		Quarterfinals	Semifinals	Final / BM	Rank
Athlete	Event	Time	Rank	Opponent Result	Opponent Result	Opponent Result	Rank
Russell Nant	Individual pursuit	5:25.24	11	did not progress			
Blair Stockwell	Individual pursuit	5:08.96	1 Q	Paris (AUS); W 5:09.63	Moore (ENG); L	Sutton (AUS); L	4
Paul Brydon; René Heyde; Russell Nant; Blair Stockwell	Team pursuit	4:50.40	2 Q	—N/a	Australia; L	Scotland; W 4:45.90	3rd place, bronze medalist(s)

Men's 10 miles scratch race

Athlete	Time	Rank
Paul Brydon	20:51.78	6
Paul Medhurst		Unplaced
John Dean		Unplaced

== Diving ==
Athlete	Event	Points	Rank
Cyril Buscke	Men's 3 m springboard	440.73	7
Karen Conway	Women's 3 m springboard	376.83	9
Rebecca Ewert	Women's 3 m springboard	379.29	8
Margaret Lay	Women's 3 m springboard	354.81	10

== Lawn bowls ==
Athlete	Event	Round robin													Rank
Athlete	Event	Opposition Score	Opposition Score	Opposition Score	Opposition Score	Opposition Score	Opposition Score	Opposition Score	Opposition Score	Opposition Score	Opposition Score	Opposition Score	Opposition Score	Opposition Score	Rank
Percy Jones	Men's singles	Salkeld (CAN); W 21–18	Snowsill (FIJ); W 23–18	Du Feu (GUE); W 21–13	Dallah (HKG); L 18–21	Williams (SAM); W 21–13	Dent (PNG); W 21–13	Lakin (MAW); W 21–15	White (AUS); L 20–21	Gosden (KEN); W 21–16	Fulton (NIR); W 24–15	Wood (SCO); L 19–21	Evans (WAL); W 22–10	Bryant (ENG); L 8–21	4
Phil Skoglund; Bob McDonald	Men's pairs	Canada; W 27–3	Fiji; L 15–28	Guernsey; W 29–7	Hong Kong; W 24–15	Western Samoa; W 32–16	Papua New Guinea; W 25–15	Malawi; W 22–11	Australia; W 22–18	Kenya; W 25–13	Northern Ireland; L 18–22	Scotland; D 17–17	Wales; W 19–15	England; W 23–21	3rd place, bronze medalist(s)
Kerry Clark; David Baldwin; John Somerville; Gordon Jolly	Men's fours	Canada; W 21–11	Scotland; W 18–11	Papua New Guinea; W 23–15	Australia; L 11–33	Northern Ireland; W 47–2	Wales; L 17–22	Fiji; W 28–15	Kenya; W 23–16	England; W 30–13	Western Samoa; W 34–11	Bye	Zambia; W 23–13	Hong Kong; W 33–9	1st place, gold medalist(s)

== Shooting ==
=== Pistol ===
Athlete	Event	Points	Rank
James Irvine	Open free pistol	522	12
John Howat	Open rapid-fire pistol	562	14
Bruce McMillan	Open rapid-fire pistol	581	3rd place, bronze medalist(s)

=== Rifle ===
Athlete	Event	Points	Rank
Ian Ballinger	Open small-bore rifle	588	4
Jack Scott	Open small-bore rifle	584	11
Frank Godfrey	Open full-bore rifle	378.25	5
Maurie Gordon	Open full-bore rifle	387.26	1st place, gold medalist(s)

=== Shotgun ===
Athlete	Event	Points	Rank
Bruce Anderson	Open skeet	174	11
James McKenzie	Open skeet	180	9
James McKenzie	Open trap	165	13
Bruce Lassen	Open trap	186	=5

== Swimming ==
Athlete	Event	Heat		Final	
Athlete	Event	Result	Rank	Result	Rank
Karol Albury	Women's 100 m freestyle	1:03.18	14	did not advance	
Allison Calder	Women's 200 m freestyle	2:11.51	10	did not advance	
Allison Calder	Women's 400 m freestyle	4:36.43	14	did not advance	
Allison Calder	Women's 800 m freestyle	9:14.59	6 Q	9:19.19	6
John Coutts	Men's 100 m butterfly	59.81	10	did not advance	
John Coutts	Men's 200 m butterfly	2:09.04	4 Q	2:07.03	3rd place, bronze medalist(s)
Ashley Fogel	Men's 200 m individual medley	2:19.84	11	did not advance	
Ashley Fogel	Men's 400 m individual medley	4:56.16	13	did not advance	
Susan Hunter	Women's 100 m backstroke	1:09.08	7 Q	1:09.06	7
Susan Hunter	Women's 200 m backstroke	2:29.32	8 Q	2:26.27	6
Susan Hunter	Women's 200 m individual medley	2:27:06	2 Q	2:26.18	3rd place, bronze medalist(s)
Susan Hunter	Women's 400 m individual medley	5:08.96	3 Q	5:07.20	3rd place, bronze medalist(s)
Michael Johnston	Men's 100 m freestyle	56.76	17	did not advance	
Michael Johnston	Men's 200 m freestyle	2:01.09	9	did not advance	
Suzanne Kennedy	Women's 200 m freestyle	2:13.93	13	did not advance	
Suzanne Kennedy	Women's 400 m freestyle	4:36.89	15	did not advance	
Suzanne Kennedy	Women's 800 m freestyle	9:24.32	13	did not advance	
Debbie Ledgerwood	Women's 100 m butterfly	1:08.07	12	did not advance	
Debbie Ledgerwood	Women's 200 m butterfly	2:26.04	8 Q	2:28.40	8
Brent Lewis	Men's 100 m breaststroke	1:12.70	11	did not advance	
Brent Lewis	Men's 200 m breaststroke	2:34.94	10	did not advance	
Jane Lowe	Women's 100 m breaststroke	1:18.42	7 Q	1:17.72	6
Jane Lowe	Women's 200 m breaststroke	2:43.34	2 Q	2:45.10	4
Brett Naylor	Men's 100 m freestyle	56.01	11	did not advance	
Brett Naylor	Men's 200 m freestyle	1:59.65	4 Q	1:59.35	6
Brett Naylor	Men's 400 m freestyle	4:09.50	2 Q	4:10.88	5
Jaynie Parkhouse	Women's 100 m freestyle	1:00.38	4 Q	1:00.96	5
Jaynie Parkhouse	Women's 200 m freestyle	2:10.32	7 Q	2:08.80	5
Jaynie Parkhouse	Women's 400 m freestyle	4:25.58	2 Q	4:23.09	3rd place, bronze medalist(s)
Jaynie Parkhouse	Women's 800 m freestyle	9:01.38	4 Q	8:58.49	1st place, gold medalist(s)
Monique Rodahl	Women's 100 m butterfly	1:08.65	14	did not advance	
Monique Rodahl	Women's 200 m backstroke	2:27.84	6 Q	2:27.67	7
Monique Rodahl	Women's 200 m individual medley	2:32.44	12	did not advance	
Philip Thorogood	Men's 100 m backstroke	1:04.69	12	did not advance	
Philip Thorogood	Men's 200 m backstroke	2:16.22	10	did not advance	
Michael Toomey	Men's 100 m butterfly	1:00.61	13	did not advance	
Mark Treffers	Men's 400 m freestyle	4:15.85	8 Q	4:05.80	4
Mark Treffers	Men's 1500 m freestyle	—N/a		15:59.82	2nd place, silver medalist(s)
Mark Treffers	Men's 400 m individual medley	4:48.74	5 Q	4:35.90	1st place, gold medalist(s)
Ashley Fogel; Brett Naylor; John Coutts; Michael Johnston	Men's 4 × 100 m freestyle relay	—N/a		3:45.76	5
Brett Naylor; John Coutts; Mark Treffers; Michael Johnston	Men's 4 × 200 m freestyle relay	—N/a		8:01.03	5
Brent Lewis; Brett Naylor; Michael Toomey; Philip Thorogood	Men's 4 × 100 m medley relay	—N/a		4:14.08	6
Allison Calder; Jaynie Parkhouse; Susan Hunter; Suzanne Kennedy	Women's 4 × 100 m freestyle relay	—N/a		4:06.94	5
Debbie Ledgerwood; Jane Lowe; Jaynie Parkhouse; Monique Rodahl	Women's 4 × 100 m medley relay	—N/a		4:41.54	5

== Weightlifting ==
Athlete	Event	Snatch	Clean and jerk	Total	Rank
Brian Duffy	Featherweight	102.5 kg	130.0 kg	232.5 kg	3rd place, bronze medalist(s)
Bruce Cameron	Lightweight	110.0 kg	142.5 kg	252.5 kg	3rd place, bronze medalist(s)
Phillip Sue	Lightweight	110.0 kg	140.0 kg	250.0 kg	5
Tony Ebert	Middleweight	117.5 kg	157.5 kg	275.0 kg	1st place, gold medalist(s)
Peter Brosnan	Light heavyweight	127.5 kg	162.5 kg	290.0 kg	4
Brian Marsden	Middle heavyweight	135.0 kg	180.0 kg	315.0 kg	2nd place, silver medalist(s)
John Bolton	Heavyweight	145.0 kg	195.0 kg	340.0 kg	2nd place, silver medalist(s)
Rory Barrett	Heavyweight	140.0 kg	180.0 kg	320.0 kg	3rd place, bronze medalist(s)
Graham May	Super heavyweight	150.0 kg	192.5 kg	342.5 kg	1st place, gold medalist(s)

== Wrestling ==
Athlete	Event	Elimination rounds				Rank
Athlete	Event	Opposition Result	Opposition Result	Opposition Result	Opposition Result	Rank
Bruce McMahon	Flyweight	Kumar (IND); L	Navie (AUS); L	did not progress		
Barry Oldridge	Bantamweight	Burke (AUS); L	Bye	Gill (ENG); L	did not progress	
Andy Roche	Featherweight	Chingle (IND); L	Brown (AUS); L	did not progress		
Paul Dalley	Lightweight	Marsh (AUS); W	Martin (CAN); L	Gilligan (ENG); L	did not progress	
Gordon Mackay	Welterweight	Pawar (IND); L	Bye	Lavallee (CAN); W	Shacklady (ENG); L	3rd place, bronze medalist(s)
David Aspin	Middleweight	O'Brien (AUS); W	Grinstead (ENG); W	Singh (IND); W	Hryb (CAN); W	1st place, gold medalist(s)
James Downey	Light heavyweight	Bye	Allan (SCO); L	Singh (IND); L	did not progress	
Gary Knight	Super heavyweight	Bye	Benko (CAN); L	Robertson (SCO); Both DQ	—N/a	3rd place, bronze medalist(s)

== Officials ==
- Team manager – Bill Holley
- Team assistant manager – Alf Haslett
- Team doctor – Graeme Campbell
- Chaperone – B. Baxter
- Physiotherapist – Peter Stokes
- Athletics
  - Section manager – Johnny Borland
  - Section assistant manager – Dave Leech
  - Section women's manager – P. A. Munro
  - Chief coach – Frank Sharpley
  - No. 2 coach – Russ Hoggard
  - No. 3 coach – Arthur Lydiard
- Boxing
  - Section manager – Bill Scott
  - Trainer – Les Rackley
  - Assistant trainer – Bob Elley
- Cycling
  - Section manager – D. B. Smith
  - Coach – Wayne Thorpe
- Shooting section manager – C. W. Stott
- Swimming
  - Section manager – Dave Gerrard
  - Chief coach – Duncan Laing
- Wrestling
  - Section manager – K. Scott
  - Coach – Brian Stannett

== See also ==
- New Zealand Olympic Committee
- New Zealand at the Commonwealth Games
- New Zealand at the 1972 Summer Olympics
- New Zealand at the 1976 Summer Olympics
