= Athletics at the 1974 British Commonwealth Games – Women's 800 metres =

Women's 800 metres at the Commonwealth Games

The women's 800 metres event at the 1974 British Commonwealth Games was held on 27 and 29 January at the Queen Elizabeth II Park in Christchurch, New Zealand.

== Medalists ==
| Gold | Silver | Bronze |
|---|---|---|
| Charlene Rendina; Australia | Sue Haden; New Zealand | Sabina Chebichi; Kenya |

== Results ==
=== Heats ===
Held on 27 January

Qualification: First 5 in each heat (Q) and the next 1 fastest (q) qualify for the semifinals.

| Rank | Heat | Name | Nationality | Time | Notes |
|---|---|---|---|---|---|
| 1 | 1 | Lorraine Moller | New Zealand | 2:05.8 | Q |
| 2 | 1 | Rose Tata | Kenya | 2:05.9 | Q |
| 3 | 1 | Rosemary Wright | Scotland | 2:06.3 | Q |
| 4 | 1 | Mwinga Mwanjala | Tanzania | 2:06.4 | Q |
| 5 | 1 | Brenda Walsh | Canada | 2:06.5 | Q |
| 6 | 1 | Sheila Carey | England | 2:09.12 | |
| 7 | 1 | Jean Lochhead | Wales | 2:09.84 | |
| | 1 | Mercy Adomah | Ghana | DQ | |
| 1 | 2 | Sabina Chebichi | Kenya | 2:04.0 | Q |
| 2 | 2 | Shirley Somervell | New Zealand | 2:04.6 | Q |
| 3 | 2 | Joan Allison | England | 2:05.0 | Q |
| 4 | 2 | Margaret Ramsay | Australia | 2:06.0 | Q |
| 5 | 2 | Margaret Coomber | Scotland | 2:06.5 | Q |
| 6 | 2 | Anne-Marie Davis | Canada | 2:08.7 | q |
| 7 | 2 | Chee Swee Lee | Singapore | 2:10.16 | |
| 8 | 2 | Grace Ebukuyo | Nigeria | 2:13.94 | |
| 1 | 3 | Sue Haden | New Zealand | 2:06.0 | Q |
| 2 | 3 | Gloria Dourass | Wales | 2:06.2 | Q |
| 3 | 3 | Maureen Crowley | Canada | 2:06.8 | Q |
| 4 | 3 | Elizabeth Chelimo | Kenya | 2:07.1 | Q |
| 5 | 3 | Charlene Rendina | Australia | 2:07.23 | Q |
| 6 | 3 | Patricia Cropper | England | 2:08.75 | |
| 7 | 3 | Helen Opoku | Ghana | 2:15.53 | |
| 8 | 3 | Sebolelo Malebatso | Lesotho | 2:27.24 | |

=== Semifinals ===
Held on 27 January

Qualification: First 4 in each semifinal (Q) qualify directly for the final.

| Rank | Heat | Name | Nationality | Time | Notes |
|---|---|---|---|---|---|
| 1 | 1 | Sabina Chebichi | Kenya | 2:04.0 | Q |
| 2 | 1 | Joan Allison | England | 2:04.1 | Q |
| 3 | 1 | Lorraine Moller | New Zealand | 2:04.2 | Q |
| 4 | 1 | Maureen Crowley | Canada | 2:04.4 | Q |
| 5 | 1 | Margaret Coomber | Scotland | 2:05.94 | |
| 6 | 1 | Margaret Ramsay | Australia | 2:06.11 | |
| 7 | 1 | Brenda Walsh | Canada | 2:08.59 | |
| 8 | 1 | Gloria Dourass | Wales | 2:08.86 | |
| 1 | 2 | Charlene Rendina | Australia | 2:03.77 | Q |
| 2 | 2 | Sue Haden | New Zealand | 2:04.9 | Q |
| 3 | 2 | Shirley Somervell | New Zealand | 2:05.2 | Q |
| 4 | 2 | Rose Tata | Kenya | 2:05.6 | Q |
| 5 | 2 | Rosemary Wright | Scotland | 2:05.73 | |
| 6 | 2 | Elizabeth Chelimo | Kenya | 2:07.30 | |
| 7 | 2 | Mwinga Mwanjala | Tanzania | 2:07.81 | |
| 8 | 2 | Anne-Marie Davis | Canada | 2:09.16 | |

=== Final ===
Held on 29 January

| Rank | Name | Nationality | Time | Notes |
|---|---|---|---|---|
| 1st place, gold medalist(s) | Charlene Rendina | Australia | 2:01.11 | GR |
| 2nd place, silver medalist(s) | Sue Haden | New Zealand | 2:02.04 | |
| 3rd place, bronze medalist(s) | Sabina Chebichi | Kenya | 2:02.61 | |
| 4 | Joan Allison | England | 2:03.10 | |
| 5 | Lorraine Moller | New Zealand | 2:03.63 | |
| 6 | Maureen Crowley | Canada | 2:05.26 | |
| 7 | Shirley Somervell | New Zealand | 2:05.83 | |
| 8 | Rose Tata | Kenya | 2:13.26 | |
