= Athletics at the 1974 British Commonwealth Games – Women's 1500 metres =

Women's 1500 metres at the Commonwealth Games

The women's 1500 metres event at the 1974 British Commonwealth Games was held on 31 January and 2 February at the Queen Elizabeth II Park in Christchurch, New Zealand.

The winning margin was 3.58 seconds which as of 2024 remains the only time the women's 1500 metres has been won by more than three seconds at these games.

== Medalists ==
Gold	Silver	Bronze
Glenda Reiser; Canada	Joan Allison; England	Thelma Wright; Canada

== Results ==
=== Heats ===
Held on 31 January

Qualification: First 4 in each heat (Q) qualify directly for the final.

Rank	Heat	Name	Nationality	Time	Notes
1	1	Glenda Reiser	Canada	4:10.8	Q
2	1	Joan Allison	England	4:14.8	Q
3	1	Mary Stewart	Scotland	4:15.3	Q
4	1	Anne Garrett	New Zealand	4:19.1	Q
5	1	Mwinga Mwanjala	Tanzania	4:19.6	
6	1	Elizabeth Cheptum	Kenya	4:21.0	
1	2	Jenny Orr	Australia	4:19.45	Q
2	2	Sylvia Potts	New Zealand	4:19.6	Q
3	2	Elizabeth Chelimo	Kenya	4:20.6	Q
4	2	Norine Braithwaite	England	4:21.0	Q
5	2	Anne-Marie Davis	Canada	4:21.1	
6	2	Mercy Adomah	Ghana	4:31.9	
7	2	Roselyne Mamotte	Mauritius	5:14.4	
1	3	Sabina Chebichi	Kenya	4:25.8	Q
2	3	Sue Haden	New Zealand	4:26.8	Q
3	3	Thelma Wright	Canada	4:26.8	Q
4	3	Sheila Carey	England	4:26.9	Q
5	3	Jean Lochhead	Wales	4:26.9	Q
6	3	Grace Ebukuyo	Nigeria	4:38.4	

=== Final ===
Held on 2 February

Rank	Name	Nationality	Time	Notes
1st place, gold medalist(s)	Glenda Reiser	Canada	4:07.78	GR
2nd place, silver medalist(s)	Joan Allison	England	4:10.66	
3rd place, bronze medalist(s)	Thelma Wright	Canada	4:12.26	
4	Mary Stewart	Scotland	4:14.73	
5	Sabina Chebichi	Kenya	4:18.56	
6	Anne Garrett	New Zealand	4:21.05	
7	Jenny Orr	Australia	4:22.54	
8	Sylvia Potts	New Zealand	4:23.12	
9	Elizabeth Chelimo	Kenya	4:26.8	
10	Sue Haden	New Zealand	4:27.8	
11	Sheila Carey	England	4:29.6	
12	Jean Lochhead	Wales	4:29.9	
	Norine Braithwaite	England	DNF	
