= Athletics at the 1974 British Commonwealth Games – Women's 4 × 400 metres relay =

Women's 4 × 400 metres relay at the Commonwealth Games

The women's 4 × 400 metres relay event at the 1974 British Commonwealth Games was held on 2 February at the Queen Elizabeth II Park in Christchurch, New Zealand. It was the first time this event was held for women at the Games with the 4 × 440 yards relay last being held in 1950.

== Results ==
Rank	Nation	Athletes	Time	Notes
1st place, gold medalist(s)	England	Jannette Roscoe, Ruth Kennedy, Sue Pettett, Verona Bernard	3:29.23	
2nd place, silver medalist(s)	Australia	Charlene Rendina, Judy Canty, Margaret Ramsay, Terri Cater	3:30.72	
3rd place, bronze medalist(s)	Canada	Brenda Walsh, Margaret McGowen, Maureen Crowley, Yvonne Saunders	3:33.92	
4	Scotland	Evelyn McMeekin, Helen Golden, Margaret Coomber, Rosemary Wright	3:33.92	
5	New Zealand	Lorraine Tong, Penny Hunt, Shirley Somervell, Sue Gukilau	3:37.5	
6	Nigeria	Florence Mbakwe, Ngozi Nwosu, Roseline Joshua, Sola Adeduro	3:40.8	
7	Ghana	Alice Annum, Helen Opoku, Mercy Adomah, Rose Asiedua	3:43.8	
8	Kenya	Elizabeth Chelimo, Elizabeth Cheptum, Rose Tata, Sabina Chebichi	3:51.9	
