= Athletics at the 1974 British Commonwealth Games – Men's 5000 metres =

Men's 5000 metres at the 1974 British Commonwealth Games
- Venue: Queen Elizabeth II Park
- Dates: 27 and 29 January

Medalists
gold medal	Ben Jipcho	Kenya
silver medal	Brendan Foster	England
bronze medal	Dave Black	England

The men's 5000 metres event at the 1974 British Commonwealth Games was held on 27 and 29 January at the Queen Elizabeth II Park in Christchurch, New Zealand.

== Medallists ==
Medal winners
Gold	Silver	Bronze
Ben Jipcho; Kenya	Brendan Foster; England	Dave Black; England

== Results ==
=== Heats ===
Held on 27 January

==== Qualification for final ====
The first 6 in each heat (Q) qualified directly for the final.

Heats results
Rank	Heat	Name	Nationality	Time	Notes
1	1	Joshua Kimeto	Kenya	13:42.6	Q
2	1	Ian Stewart	Scotland	13:57.2	Q
3	1	Ben Jipcho	Kenya	13:57.2	Q
4	1	Bryan Rose	New Zealand	13:57.2	Q
5	1	Dave Black	England	13:59.9	Q
6	1	Mustafa Musa	Uganda	14:18.4	Q
7	1	Bernard Hayward	Wales	14:23.24	
	1	Graham Crouch	Australia	DNS	
	1	Dan Shaughnessy	Canada	DNS	
	1	Dick Tayler	New Zealand	DNS	
1	2	Brendan Foster	England	13:45.6	Q
2	2	Suleiman Nyambui	Tanzania	13:46.0	Q
3	2	David Fitzsimons	Australia	13:46.18	Q
4	2	Paul Mose	Kenya	13:50.2	Q
5	2	Gordon Minty	Wales	13:59.2	Q
6	2	David Bedford	England	13:59.2	Q
7	2	Kevin Ryan	New Zealand	14:07.42	
8	2	Bob Hendy	Australia	14:14.98	
9	2	Norman Morrison	Scotland	14:40.64	
10	2	Golekane Mosveu	Botswana	14:46.14	
11	2	Motseki Monethi	Lesotho	15:05.32	

=== Final ===
Held on 29 January

Final result
Rank	Name	Nationality	Time	Notes
1st place, gold medalist(s)	Ben Jipcho	Kenya	13:14.4	GR
2nd place, silver medalist(s)	Brendan Foster	England	13:14.6	
3rd place, bronze medalist(s)	Dave Black	England	13:23.52	
4	Suleiman Nyambui	Tanzania	13:34.91	
5	Ian Stewart	Scotland	13:40.32	
6	David Fitzsimons	Australia	13:42.83	
7	Joshua Kimeto	Kenya	13:43.6	
8	Gordon Minty	Wales	13:45.48	
9	Paul Mose	Kenya	13:54.44	
10	Bryan Rose	New Zealand	14:00.93	
11	David Bedford	England	14:18.76	
12	Mustafa Musa	Uganda	14:25.39	
