= Nathan Healey (athlete) =

New Zealand runner (1949–2026)

Personal information
- Born: Nathan Henry Healey; 13 March 1949 Gisborne, New Zealand
- Died: 6 March 2026 (aged 76) Auckland, New Zealand
- Relative: Howard Healey (brother)

Sport
- Country: New Zealand
- Sport: Athletics; Cross country running
- Events: 3000 metres steeplechase; Cross country

Achievements and titles
- National finals: 3000 m steeplechase champion (1971, 1972, 1975)
- Personal best: 3000 m steeplechase – 8:43.2 (1973)
Medal record
Representing New Zealand
Men's cross country
World championships
Bronze medal – third place	1973 Waregem	Team

Nathan Henry Healey (13 March 1949 – 6 March 2026) was a New Zealand runner who specialised in the 3000 metres steeplechase and cross country. He won three national titles and represented his country at the 1974 British Commonwealth Games in the steeplechase, and won a bronze medal in the teams event at the 1973 IAAF World Cross Country Championships.

== Early life ==
Healey was born on 13 March 1949, and was of Māori descent through his mother, affiliating to Ngāti Porou. When Healey was three years old, his parents divorced and his mother was admitted to the Pukeora Sanatorium.

Growing up in Gisborne, Healey joined the Gisborne Harrier Club aged seven, and was a competitive runner from an early age, placing second in the junior race at the Gisborne Harrier Club's championships in 1965. After moving to Wellington in his teens, he was a member of the Scottish Harrier Club in that city.

== Running career ==
By 1970, Healey had moved to Auckland, where he was coached by Bill Baillie at the Lynndale Athletic Club. Both Healey and his twin brother, Howard, specialised in the 3000 metres steeplechase, and were known for being free-spirited and for their long hair.

Healey won three national titles in the 3000 metres steeplechase, in 1971, 1972 and 1975. He achieved his personal best for the event in Auckland on 17 February 1973, with a time of 8:43.2. As of 2026, the time is 19th best on the New Zealand all-time list.

At the 1974 Commonwealth Games, Healey ran a time of 8:52.2 in the 3000 metres steeplechase to finish tenth, one place and 0.2 seconds ahead of his brother.

Healey was a member of the eight-man New Zealand team at the 1973 IAAF World Cross Country Championships in Waregem, Belgium. He placed 54th individually, and the New Zealand team—Rod Dixon, Dick Tayler, Bryan Rose, Euan Robertson, Eddie Gray, Nathan and Howard Healey, and John Sheddan—won the bronze medal in the teams event.

== Later life ==
In later life, Healey continued to be fit and active, and would regularly cycle the 40-kilometre (25 mi) return journey to a cafe in central Auckland from his home in Swanson. On such an excursion on 27 February 2026, he was found semi-conscious on the cycle path with brain injuries, and was taken to Auckland Hospital, where he died on 6 March 2026, at the age of 76. Healey's death is the subject of investigation by the police and the coroner, who have yet to determine the circumstances that led to his death.
