= John Campbell (runner) =

New Zealand long-distance runner

Personal information
- Nationality: New Zealand
- Born: 6 February 1949 (age 77) Dunedin, New Zealand

Sport
- Sport: Long-distance running
- Event: Marathon

John Campbell (born 6 February 1949) is a New Zealand long-distance runner. He competed in the men's marathon at the 1988 Summer Olympics.

He set the Masters record when at the age of 41, he ran 2:11:04 at the 1990 Boston Marathon, breaking the previous Masters record by 15 seconds set by Jack Foster at the 1974 British Commonwealth Games.
