= Athletics at the 1974 British Commonwealth Games – Women's 400 metres =

Women's 400 metres at the Commonwealth Games

The women's 400 metres event at the 1974 British Commonwealth Games was held on 25 and 26 January at the Queen Elizabeth II Park in Christchurch, New Zealand.

== Medalists ==
Gold	Silver	Bronze
Yvonne Saunders; Canada	Verona Bernard; England	Charlene Rendina; Australia

== Results ==
=== Heats ===
Held on 25 January

Qualification: First 4 in each heat (Q) qualify directly for the semifinals.

Rank	Heat	Name	Nationality	Time	Notes
1	1	Verona Bernard	England	53.2	Q
2	1	Lorna Forde	Barbados	54.7	Q
3	1	Bethanie Nail	Australia	55.16	Q
4	1	Florence Mbakwe	Nigeria	55.4	Q
5	1	Brenda Walsh	Canada	56.12	
6	1	Maleshoane Molomo	Lesotho	1:02.96	
1	2	Jannette Roscoe	England	54.0	Q
2	2	Judy Canty	Australia	54.10	Q
3	2	Evelyn McMeekin	Scotland	55.0	Q
4	2	Chee Swee Lee	Singapore	56.2	Q
5	2	Colleen Mills	New Zealand	57.54	
6	2	Padmadevi Valamootoo	Mauritius	1:05.37	
1	3	Charlene Rendina	Australia	54.28	Q
2	3	Marilyn Neufville	Jamaica	54.3	Q
3	3	Sue Gukilau	New Zealand	55.3	Q
4	3	Roseline Joshua	Nigeria	55.9	Q
5	3	Joan Eddy	Canada	57.58	
6	3	Janet Manda	Malawi	59.51	
1	4	Yvonne Saunders	Canada	53.0	Q
2	4	Penny Hunt	New Zealand	55.2	Q
3	4	Dawn Webster	England	55.44	Q
4	4	Gloria Dourass	Wales	55.8	Q
5	4	Helen Opoku	Ghana	57.01	
6	4	Ngozi Nwosu	Nigeria	58.03	

=== Semifinals ===
Held on 25 January

Qualification: First 4 in each semifinal (Q) qualify directly for the final.

Rank	Heat	Name	Nationality	Time	Notes
1	1	Charlene Rendina	Australia	52.82	Q
2	1	Marilyn Neufville	Jamaica	53.4	Q
3	1	Jannette Roscoe	England	53.5	Q
4	1	Judy Canty	Australia	54.03	Q
5	1	Lorna Forde	Barbados	54.36	
6	1	Roseline Joshua	Nigeria	54.67	
7	1	Sue Gukilau	New Zealand	55.76	
	1	Dawn Webster	England	DNF	
1	2	Yvonne Saunders	Canada	52.2	Q
2	2	Verona Bernard	England	53.8	Q
3	2	Penny Hunt	New Zealand	55.0	Q
4	2	Bethanie Nail	Australia	55.15	Q
5	2	Florence Mbakwe	Nigeria	55.65	
6	2	Evelyn McMeekin	Scotland	55.66	
7	2	Gloria Dourass	Wales	56.07	
8	2	Chee Swee Lee	Singapore	56.71	

=== Final ===
Held on 26 January

Rank	Lane	Name	Nationality	Time	Notes
1st place, gold medalist(s)	7	Yvonne Saunders	Canada	51.67	
2nd place, silver medalist(s)	3	Verona Bernard	England	51.94	
3rd place, bronze medalist(s)	4	Charlene Rendina	Australia	52.08	
4	8	Jannette Roscoe	England	53.18	
5	?	Judy Canty	Australia	53.47	
6	2	Marilyn Neufville	Jamaica	54.04	
7	1	Penny Hunt	New Zealand	54.30	
8	?	Bethanie Nail	Australia	54.54	
