= Hugh Morrison (weightlifter) =

Scottish weightlifter and New Zealand weightlifting coach (1919–1979)

Jock Morrison
Personal information
- Born: Hugh Morrison; 8 June 1919 Glengarnock, Ayrshire, Scotland
- Died: 3 September 1979 (aged 60) Christchurch, New Zealand
- Occupation: Bricklayer

Sport
- Country: Scotland
- Sport: Weightlifting
- Event: Light heavyweight

Achievements and titles
- National finals: Scottish champion (1947, 1948, 1949)

Hugh "Jock" Morrison (8 June 1919 – 3 September 1979) was a weightlifter from Scotland who competed at the 1950 British Empire Games. After settling in New Zealand, he became a leading weightlifting coach, mentoring lifters including Tony Ebert and Graham May, and coached the New Zealand weightlifting team at the 1970 British Commonwealth Games. He was regarded as the "father of weightlifting" in Canterbury.

== Early life and family ==
Morrison was born in Glengarnock, Ayrshire, Scotland, on 8 June 1919, the son of Hugh Morrison, a steelworker, and Mary Morrison (née Johnstone). Trained as a stonemason, he served overseas for five years in the Royal Army Medical Corps during World War II.

== Weightlifting career ==
Morrison won Scottish weightlifting titles in 1947, 1948 and 1949, and broke 38 Scottish weightlifting records. In 1949, he travelled to New Zealand, and was selected to represent Scotland at the 1950 British Empire Games in Auckland. Competing in the light-heavyweight division, he finished fifth, behind gold medallist Jim Varaleau from Canada.

After settling in Christchurch, New Zealand, Morrison worked as a stonemason and bricklayer, and maintained his involvement in weightlifting. He was instrumental in growing the sport of weightlifting in Christchurch, both as a coach and an administrator. He was a founding member of the Canterbury Weightlifting Association, and the driving force behind its growth, leading its move to new headquarters and ensuring that it had the best possible equipment. He became known as the "father of weightlifting" in Canterbury.

Morrison began holding coaching clinics, and his coaching style, described as "dynamic", attracted new participants to the sport, most notably Graham May and Tony Ebert, who both went on to win gold medals representing New Zealand at the 1974 British Commonwealth Games, held in Christchurch. He also coached Brian Duffy, who earned a bronze medal at the same games.

In 1969, Morrison was awarded the silver medal of merit by the International Weightlifting Federation, and in 1974 he received the federation's gold medal for his service to the sport.

In 1970, Morrison was named coach of the New Zealand weightlifting team that competed at the 1970 British Commonwealth Games in Edinburgh. At those games, his protégé, Tony Ebert, won a silver medal.

In his 50s, Morrison was still able to lift his bodyweight, 77 kilograms (170 lb), above his head, and deadlift more than 180 kilograms (400 lb).

== Death and legacy ==
Morrison died at Princess Margaret Hospital in Christchurch on 3 September 1979, at the age of 60. His funeral service was conducted by Don Oliver, who eulogised Morrison, saying that he was "a dedicated Christian who put his pupils' welfare always before his own and was the greatest lifting coach New Zealand had had". Morrison's obituary in The Press newspaper remarked on his "tenacity of spirit and indomitable will".

Following Morrison's death, the New Zealand Weightlifting Association instituted a memorial trophy in his name, competed for by junior weightlifters.
