= Athletics at the 1974 British Commonwealth Games – Men's 1500 metres =

Men's 1500 metres at the 1974 British Commonwealth Games
- Venue: Queen Elizabeth II Park
- Dates: 31 January and 2 February

Medalists
gold medal	Filbert Bayi	Tanzania
silver medal	John Walker	New Zealand
bronze medal	Ben Jipcho	Kenya

The men's 1500 metres event at the 1974 British Commonwealth Games was held on 31 January and 2 February at the Queen Elizabeth II Park in Christchurch, New Zealand.

== Medallists ==
Medal winners
Gold	Silver	Bronze
Filbert Bayi; Tanzania	John Walker; New Zealand	Ben Jipcho; Kenya

== Results ==
=== Heats ===
Held on 31 January

==== Qualification for final ====
The first 4 in each heat (Q) qualified directly for the final.

Heats results
Rank	Heat	Name	Nationality	Time	Notes
1	1	Mike Boit	Kenya	3:44.6	Q
2	1	Graham Crouch	Australia	3:44.62	Q
3	1	Rod Dixon	New Zealand	3:44.6	Q
3	1	Brendan Foster	England	3:44.9	Q
5	1	Jaiye Abidoye	Nigeria	3:49.9	
6	1	Bernard Hayward	Wales	3:50.3	
7	1	Samuela Bulai	Fiji	4:10.5	
1	2	Filbert Bayi	Tanzania	3:38.2	Q
2	2	John Kirkbride	England	3:39.8	Q
3	2	David Fitzsimons	Australia	3:39.92	Q
4	2	Tony Polhill	New Zealand	3:40.30	Q
5	2	Paul Lawther	Northern Ireland	3:43.1	
6	2	Cosmas Silei	Kenya	3:44.7	
7	2	Phillip Kayo	Papua New Guinea	4:05.4	
	2	Richard Kermode	Fiji	DNS	
	2	John Davies	Wales	DNS	
1	3	John Walker	New Zealand	3:42.5	Q
2	3	Suleiman Nyambui	Tanzania	3:42.6	Q
3	3	Randal Markey	Australia	3:42.77	Q
4	3	Ben Jipcho	Kenya	3:43.6	Q
5	3	Kenneth Elmer	Canada	3:44.0	
6	3	Keith Falla	Guernsey	3:58.9	
7	3	Gerard Domaingue	Mauritius	4:08.1	
	3	Joseph Jampilda	Nigeria	DNF	
	3	Andy Carter	England	DNS	

=== Final ===
Held on 2 February, the final was led by Filbert Bayi from start to finish. Both he and home favourite John Walker broke Jim Ryun's seven-year-old world record of 3:33.1, with Ben Jipcho just outside Ryun's time when holding off Walker's teammate Rod Dixon.

Final result
Rank	Name	Nationality	Time	Notes
1st place, gold medalist(s)	Filbert Bayi	Tanzania	3:32.16	WR
2nd place, silver medalist(s)	John Walker	New Zealand	3:32.52	AR
3rd place, bronze medalist(s)	Ben Jipcho	Kenya	3:33.16	
4	Rod Dixon	New Zealand	3:33.89	
5	Graham Crouch	Australia	3:34.22	NR
6	Mike Boit	Kenya	3:36.84	
7	Brendan Foster	England	3:37.64	
8	Suleiman Nyambui	Tanzania	3:39.62	
9	David Fitzsimons	Australia	3:41.30	
10	John Kirkbride	England	3:41.91	
11	Randal Markey	Australia	3:44.56	
	Tony Polhill	New Zealand	DNS	
