= Athletics at the 1974 British Commonwealth Games – Men's 10,000 metres =

Men's 10,000 metres at the 1974 British Commonwealth Games
- Venue: Queen Elizabeth II Park
- Dates: 25 January

Medalists
gold medal	Dick Tayler	New Zealand
silver medal	Dave Black	England
bronze medal	Richard Juma	Kenya

The men's 10,000 metres event at the 1974 British Commonwealth Games was held on 25 January at the Queen Elizabeth II Park in Christchurch, New Zealand.

== Results ==
Final result
Rank	Name	Nationality	Time	Notes
1st place, gold medalist(s)	Dick Tayler	New Zealand	27:46.4	
2nd place, silver medalist(s)	Dave Black	England	27:48.6	
3rd place, bronze medalist(s)	Richard Juma	Kenya	27:57.0	
4	David Bedford	England	28:14.8	
5	Dan Shaughnessy	Canada	28:14.8	
6	Ian Stewart	Scotland	28:17.2	
7	Tony Simmons	England	28:28.6	
8	Gordon Minty	Wales	28:44.4	
9	Paul Mose	Kenya	28:52.6	
10	Joseph Stewart	Scotland	29:22.6	
11	Bernard Plain	Wales	29:28.4	
12	Kevin Ryan	New Zealand	29:50.0	
13	Philip Watson	New Zealand	29:54.8	
14	David Cowell	Isle of Man	30:05.4	
15	Norman Morrison	Scotland	30:25.8	
16	Motseki Monethi	Lesotho	30:53.6	
17	Neville Dalmedo	Gibraltar	34:14.0	
18	Vivian Ori	Papua New Guinea	34:15.2	
19	Porohu Taia	Cook Islands	34:41.0	
	Patrick Kiingi	Kenya	DNF	
	Brenton Norman	Australia	DNS	
	Jerome Drayton	Canada	DNS	
