= Filbert Bayi =

Tanzanian middle-distance runner

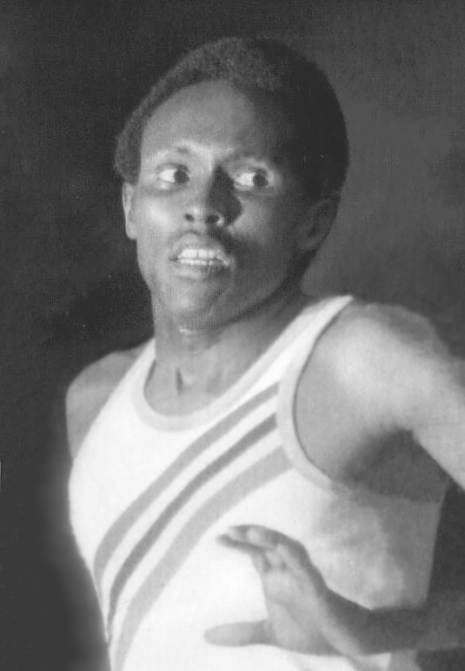
- Bayi in 1975

Personal information
- Born: June 22, 1953 (age 73) Karatu, Arusha Region, Tanganyika Territory
- Height: 1.83 m (6 ft 0 in)
- Weight: 59 kg (130 lb)

Sport
- Country: Tanzania
- Sport: Athletics/Track, Mid-distance running
- Events: 800 metres, 1500 metres, mile, 5000 metres, steeplechase

Achievements and titles
- Personal bests: Outdoor; 800 m: 1:45.32 (Christchurch 1974); 1500 m: 3:32.16 NR (Christchurch 1974); Mile: 3:51.0 NR (Kingston 1975); 3000 m: 7:39.27 NR (Oslo 1980); 2-mile: 8:19.45 (London 1980); 5000 m: 13:18.2 (Oslo 1980); 3000 m s’chase: 8:12.48 NR (Moscow 1980); Indoor; Mile: 3:54.5 NR (Los Angeles 1980); 3000 m: 7:50.4 (Edmonton 1980); 5000 m: 13:45.16 (Toronto 1981)
Medal record
Representing Tanzania
Olympic Games
| Silver medal – second place | 1980 Moscow | 3000 m steeplechase |
Commonwealth Games
| Gold medal – first place | 1974 Christchurch | 1500 m |
| Silver medal – second place | 1978 Edmonton | 1500 m |
All-Africa Games
| Gold medal – first place | 1973 Lagos | 1500 m |
| Gold medal – first place | 1978 Algiers | 1500 m |

Filbert Bayi Sanka (born June 23, 1953) is a Tanzanian former middle-distance runner who competed throughout the 1970s. He set the world records for 1500 metres in 1974 and the mile in 1975. His world record in the 1500 m was also the Commonwealth Games record until 2022.

== Running career ==
Born in a small village of Karatu, near Arusha, Tanzania, he had to run eight miles every day to and from school as a boy. His greatest moment was arguably the 1500 m final at the 1974 Commonwealth Games in Christchurch, New Zealand, when he won the gold medal ahead of New Zealand runner John Walker and Kenyan Ben Jipcho. Bayi set a new world record of 3 min 32.16 s, ratified by the IAAF as 3:32.2, and Walker went under the old world record set by Jim Ryun as well. Third place Jipcho, fourth place Rod Dixon, and fifth place Graham Crouch also ran the fourth, fifth, and seventh fastest 1500 m times to that date. It is still classed as one of the greatest 1500 m races of all time. There was no jockeying for position in the race; Bayi led from the beginning at a fast pace and was 20 metres ahead at 800 metres, with the other runners strung out in a line behind him.

"Think about the change that occurred in the 1500m at Christchurch. The 1500m was usually a slow race and then a sprint [at the finish]. But in 1974 I changed that from the beginning to the end. And not many people have thought about that."

— Filbert Bayi

In 1975, Bayi broke Ryun's eight-year-old mile record by clocking 3:51.0 in Kingston, Jamaica on 17 May. The record was short-lived as Walker became history's first sub-3:50 miler on 12 August of the same year, running 3:49.4 at Gothenburg.

It was hoped that the Bayi-Walker clash would continue but, because Tanzania boycotted the 1976 Summer Olympics in Montreal, it never materialized. However, since Bayi was suffering from a bout of malaria shortly before the Olympics, he may not have been able to challenge Walker even if there had been no boycott.

Bayi won a silver medal in the 3000 m steeplechase at the 1980 Summer Olympics in Moscow. He ran 8:12.5 behind Bronisław Malinowski.

== Later life ==
After retirement Bayi has spent much effort in setting up the Filbert Bayi Foundation which aims to guide young sporting talent in Tanzania. It is based in Mkuza, about 50 km from Dar es Salaam. The complex also aims to educate young people about HIV and AIDS, plus ways of getting out of poverty. The foundation started in 2003. Bayi has also opened a Primary and Nursery school based in Kimara, as well as the Secondary school which is based in Kibaha. The schools have been partnered with Barlby High School as part of the Dreams and Teams project set up by the British Council/Youth Sport Trust. The school hosted students from Barlby High School in January and February 2008. Bayi is also a member of the IAAF Technical Committee and is Secretary-General of the Tanzanian Olympic Committee.

== International competitions ==
| Year | Competition | Venue | Position | Event | Notes |
Representing Tanzania
| 1972 | Olympic Games | Munich, West Germany | 46th (h) | 1500 m | 3:45.4 |
| 1972 | Olympic Games | Munich, West Germany | 31st (h) | 3000 m s'chase | 8:41.4 |
| 1973 | All-Africa Games | Lagos, Nigeria | 1st | 1500 m | 3:37.23 |
| 1974 | British Commonwealth Games | Christchurch, New Zealand | 4th | 800 m | 1:45.32 |
| 1974 | British Commonwealth Games | Christchurch, New Zealand | 1st | 1500 m | 3:32.16 |
| 1978 | All-Africa Games | Algiers, Algeria | 1st | 1500 m | 3:36.21 |
| 1978 | Commonwealth Games | Edmonton, Canada | 2nd | 1500 m | 3:35.59 |
| 1980 | Olympic Games | Moscow, Soviet Union | 2nd | 3000 m s'chase | 8:12.48 |

Records
| Preceded by (United States) Jim Ryun | Men's 1500 m World Record Holder; February 2, 1974 – August 15, 1979 | Succeeded by (United Kingdom) Sebastian Coe |
| Preceded by (United States) Jim Ryun | Men's Mile World Record Holder; May 17, 1975 – August 12, 1975 | Succeeded by (New Zealand) John Walker |
