= Athletics at the 1974 British Commonwealth Games – Men's marathon =

Men's marathon at the 1974 British Commonwealth Games
- Venue: Christchurch
- Dates: 31 January

Medalists
gold medal	Ian Thompson	England
silver medal	Jack Foster	New Zealand
bronze medal	Richard Mabuza	Swaziland

The men's marathon event at the 1974 Commonwealth Games was held on 31 January 1974 in Christchurch, New Zealand.

== Course ==
The marathon course ran from the start line at Queen Elizabeth II Park in North New Brighton, passing through the central city and Hagley Park, to Christchurch Airport. Athletes then turned around and followed the same route back to the finish line at Queen Elizabeth II Park.

== Results ==
Final result
Rank	Name	Nationality	Time	Notes
1st place, gold medalist(s)	Ian Thompson	England	2:09:12.0	GR
2nd place, silver medalist(s)	Jack Foster	New Zealand	2:11:18.6	
3rd place, bronze medalist(s)	Richard Mabuza	Swaziland	2:12:54.4	
4	Terry Manners	New Zealand	2:12:58.6	
5	John Farrington	Australia	2:14:04.0	
6	Donald Macgregor	Scotland	2:14:15.4	
7	Bernard Plain	Wales	2:14:56.2	
8	Colin Kirkham	England	2:16:06.6	
9	Malcolm Thomas	Wales	2:16:46.8	
10	John Robinson	New Zealand	2:17:05.4	
11	Brian Armstrong	Canada	2:20:52.6	
12	Gabashane Rakabele	Lesotho	2:21:41.0	
13	David Cowell	Isle of Man	2:23:33.8	
14	Brenton Norman	Australia	2:24:28.4	
15	Michael Teer	Northern Ireland	2:24:55.0	
16	Reuben Dlamini	Swaziland	2:27:31.4	
17	Jerome Drayton	Canada	2:29:20.0	
18	Ron Hill	England	2:30:24.2	
19	Frans Matsebula	Swaziland	2:35:05.8	
20	Kiptanui Sirma	Kenya	2:38:03.2	
21	Hassan Juma	Tanzania	2:38:51.2	
22	Neville Dalmedo	Gibraltar	2:40:13.8	
23	Pareau Umaki	Cook Islands	3:04:34.2	
	Derek Clayton	Australia	DNF	
	Patrick Kiingi	Kenya	DNF	
	James Ocaro	Kenya	DNF	
	John McLaughlin	Northern Ireland	DNF	
	Vivian Ori	Papua New Guinea	DNF	
	James Hoeflich	Western Samoa	DNF	
	Amani Tapusoa	Western Samoa	DNF	
	Joseph Stewart	Scotland	DNF	
	James Wight	Scotland	DNF	
	Mustafa Musa	Uganda	DNF	
	Porohu Taia	Cook Islands	DNS	
