= Bill Tancred =

British discus thrower

Bill Tancred MBE
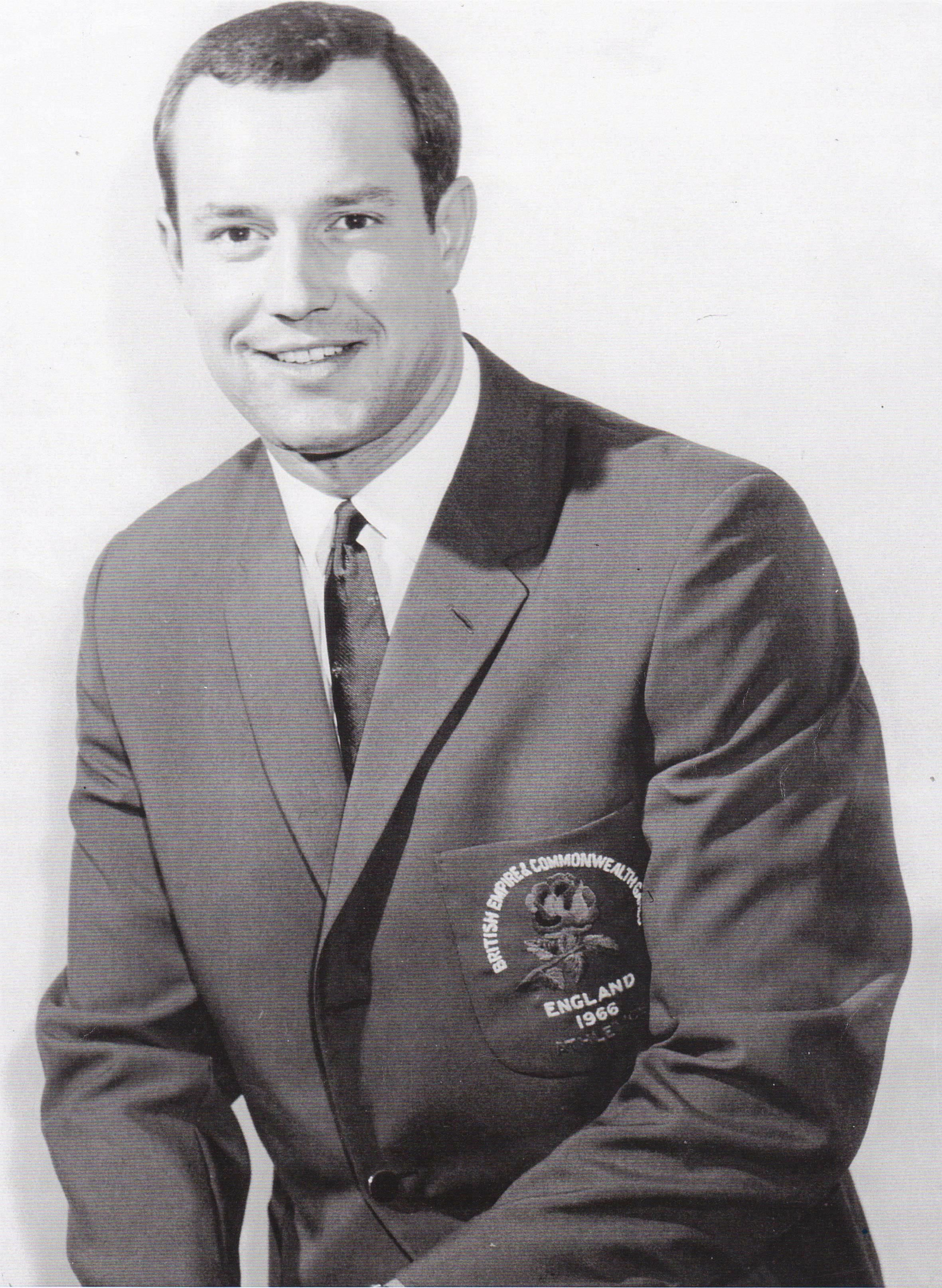

Personal information
- Nationality: British (English)
- Born: 6 August 1942 (age 84) Quetta, Balochistan, British India
- Height: 193 cm (6 ft 4 in)
- Weight: 110 kg (243 lb)
- Relative: Pete Tancred

Sport
- Sport: Athletics
- Event: discus throw / shot put
- Club: Birchfield Harriers
Medal record
Representing England
Commonwealth Games
Bronze medal – third place	1970 Edinburgh	discus
Silver medal – second place	1974 Christchurch	discus

William Raymond Tancred (born 6 August 1942) is a sports administrator, academic, coach and former international athlete, who was also at one time a British Army PTI. He competed at the 1968 and 1972 Summer Olympics in the discus and won bronze, and silver medals in successive Commonwealth Games from 1970 to 1974. He was the British national discus champion on nine occasions, and held the British record for 25 years, his personal best being 64.94m in 1974. He also competed in the shot put and remains one of the top ten British shot putters. Athleticsweekly.com has ranked Tancred as the greatest British discus thrower of all time by virtue of his long reign as British record-holder and profusion of AAA Championships titles. Bill Tancred was also the first UK athlete to break the 200 ft/61m discus barrier in 1972, which was also a UK all-comers record for the event (61.94m). Even in 2011 he could still claim to be one of the best all round throwers ever in British Athletics.

== Early life ==
Bill Tancred was born in Quetta, Balochistan, Pakistan, and grew up in Felixstowe. He was one of five siblings, one younger brother being the athlete and professional strongman, Pete Tancred. As a school boy, the javelin was his main event but he developed elbow trouble and was forced to abandon this event. His father, Adrian, believed that this was not a barrier to athletics in another discipline and Bill took up the discus in which his father coached him. After the family moved to Ipswich from Felixstowe he would find roads with adjoining fields to throw into and would often lose the discus in the long grass. In addition, chalk was used to draw a discus and shot circle on the road. His father would get him to read books on the subject as well, to hone the technique, a discipline not used widely in the 1950s. Bill's father would also improvise with equipment if none were available. He joined Ipswich Harriers and trained at the Ipswich Town training ground. This gave him opportunities for competition within the county and also in the Eastern Counties framework.

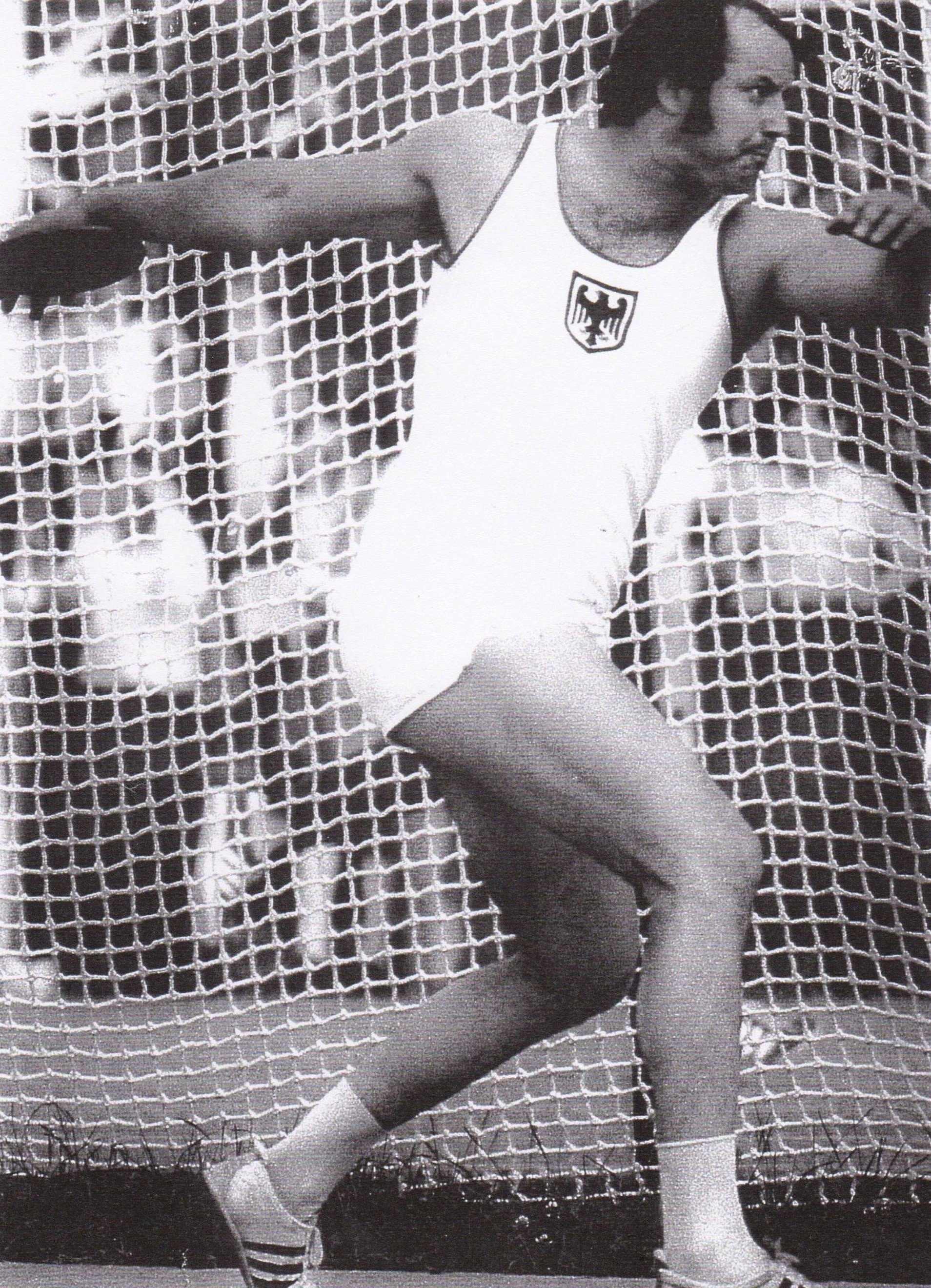

== Sport ==
Having represented his county, he competed in the Eastern Counties and rose quickly to domestic prominence. His first international vest for Great Britain was in 1964 against the Benelux Countries in Ghent. Although proud of his British and European and Commonwealth achievements, Tancred has made it clear that the pinnacle of being an athlete is to compete at the Olympic games, and in interviews recalls getting a letter signed by the Duke of Edinburgh, telling him that he had been selected to represent Great Britain in the 1968 Olympics. He took his father, mother, friends and siblings for a meal to celebrate. As a young athlete, he recalls being awestruck at the Olympics. He saw Bob Beamon set the long jump record, recalled talking to athletes about a new high jump method called the Fosbury flop, witnessed the Black power salute of the American sprinters and found himself competing against his idol, Al Oerter, already the three time Olympic discus champion who won his fourth gold medal in Mexico, which he reportedly said was one for each of his daughters. Of his own performance, Tancred has said that he felt he ought to have thrown better but a combination of over training and lack of experience in such a big arena as the Olympics were his downfall. The discipline of waiting long periods between throws was something he had not appreciated and found hard to reconcile to a more explosive approach that he employed.

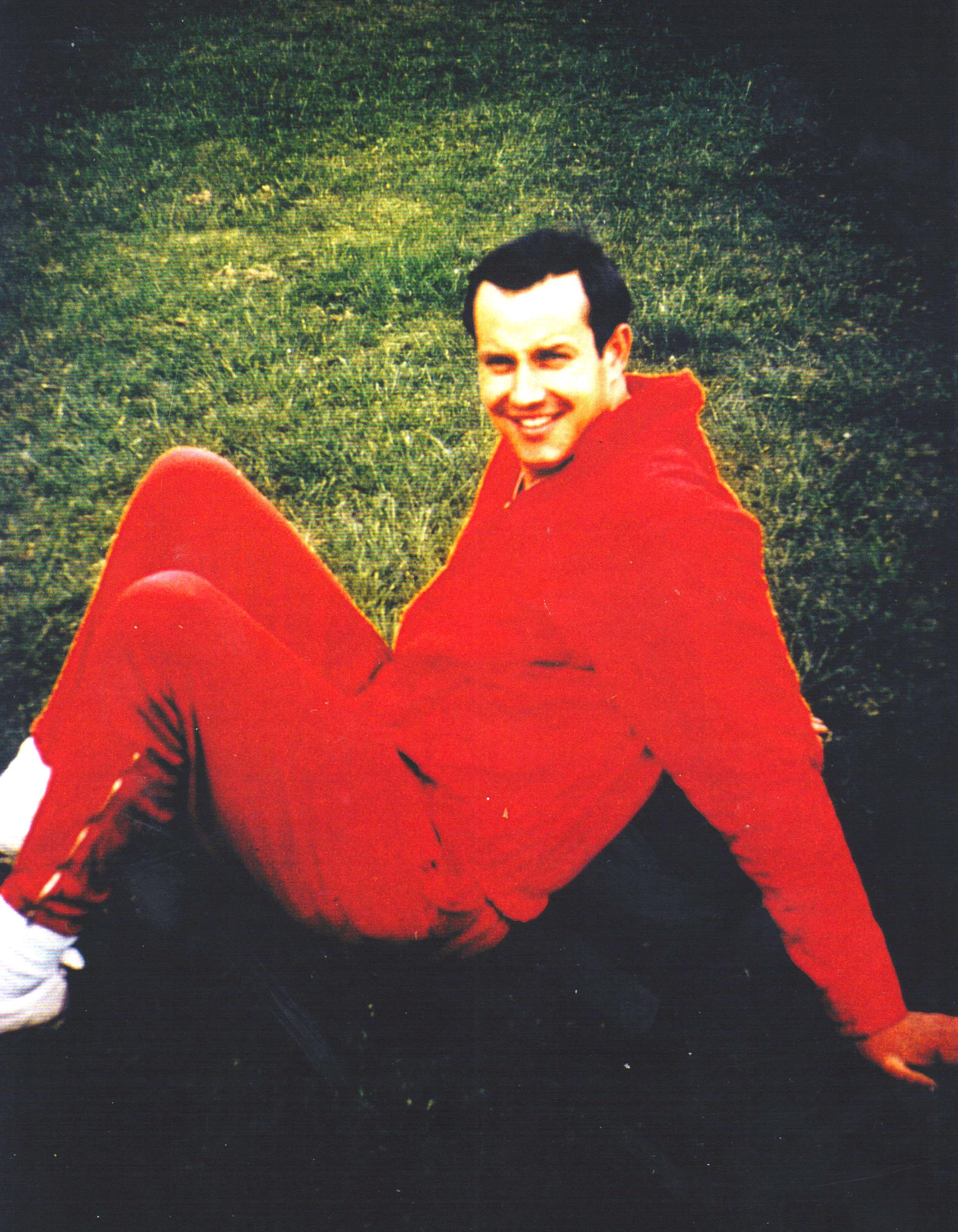

One of the nineteen occasions that he broke the British record was at the 1972 AAA Championships in Crystal Palace, where he won a windproof jacket as an event prize with the sponsors name on it (Nationwide Building Society). However, he was not permitted to wear the jacket at AAA events due to the strict rules about sponsorship.

In total, Tancred represented Great Britain 55 times. He competed at the 1968 and 1972 Summer Olympics in the discus, and was also selected for the shot put event in 1972 but a shoulder injury prevented him in competing. Bill Tancred also took part in three Commonwealth Games in 1966, 1970, (where he achieved the bronze medal) and 1974 (where he achieved the silver medal). He also competed at the 1966, 1969 and 1971 European Championships. Domestically, he set the British discus record on nineteen occasions. He was seven times the AAA Champion having won the AAA discus title from 1966 to 1970 and 1972–1973. His mark of 64.94m in 1974, set in Loughborough on 21 July 1974, was his personal best but his British record was set after this in Woodford on 10 August 1974 at 64.32m. This remained the best thrown by a British athlete until Richard Slaney bettered it on 1 July 1985, in Eugene, Oregon, United States, although unofficially. Robert Weir officially broke the record in 1997. Tancred remains sixth on the British all-time list for the discus. He also competed in the shot and remains one of the top ten British shot putters. He won the British National Indoor (AAA) Championships for the shot in 1969 and 1976. Interestingly, he came 3rd in the AAA junior championships for the javelin in 1960.

https://commons.wikimedia.org/wiki/File:MEDAL_CEREMONY_FEBRUARY_1974_CHRISTCHURCH_NZ.jpg

== Life outside sport ==
Tancred also served in the Army, first with the 1st East Anglian Regiment in Aden 1964 and then with the Army Physical Training Corps as a staff instructor at The Royal Military Academy, Sandhurst. After his military service, he attended Loughborough College for teacher training, and then went on to Loughborough University, renowned for its sporting reputation, for a master's degree in human biology. He then obtained another master's degree by research, in physical education. Continuing his education he received a NATO Fellowship to study for a doctorate in sports management in the United States (West Virginia University).

As an academic he has taught and lectured in schools, colleges, polytechnics and universities, and among his many positions was for a long time the director of physical education and sport at Sheffield University as well as the professor of sports studies at Buckinghamshire Chilterns University College and the University of Suffolk including lecturing in 1976–1980 at the Trent Polytechnic, Clifton, the Education School.

At Sheffield University he developed the UK's first postgraduate degree courses in both sports management and sports coaching. The latter, unlike any other sports course, combined physical education with scientific and clinical expertise from a medical school in 1991.⁣ s a former soldier, Bill created another "first" - a postgraduate diploma level in physical education and sports studies - specially created for Army Physical Training Corps (APTC) officers and offered by Sheffield University from 1989. No other university had previously accepted military officers in this way in sport studies. This innovation facilitated and opened doors for all APTC personnel to secure places in other higher education institutes to study for master's degrees and diplomas in medical rehabilitation, health studies, sports sciences and sports leadership. He is also a published author, having written a number of books as well as numerous articles and has presented papers at conferences in subjects relating to human sports performance, health-related fitness and coaching. In November 2016 he published an autobiography, and during the COVID lockdown (2020) he published Ageing Youthfully – A Way of Life. With his interest in films and the Second World War, he recently published another book (2024) entitled British and U.S.A. Film Stars who served in World War 2 (Amazon Books).

After his retirement from competition, Tancred remained actively involved in sport and served on several committees, including being chairman of the International Athletes Club and president of Sheffield University's World Student Games Directorate. He later became the national event coach to the British Amateur Athletics Board (BAAB) and also coach of UK Athletics and the International Association of Athletics Federations (IAAF). In 2007 he joined the board of the British Olympic Association. He has been active in pushing forward proposals to encourage greater sport and physical activity participation in schools.

In 2007, Bill collaborated with Professor Linda Carson from West Virginia University in the US. Professor Carson of the hugely successful Choosey Kids programme (standing for Choose Healthy Options and Start Young). After watching and studying this fun learning experience for young children to develop good motor skills and exercise with laughter and happiness, he decided to launch a similar programme in England when he returned to help promote healthy lifestyles and curb childhood obesity. He created a name, a cartoon character and delivered many talks around Suffolk to engage children in the programme. With several primary Schools taking up the programme, Bill wrote to the Department for Children Schools and Families in November 2007, who eventually launched a pilot scheme with the same aims, that incorporated cartoon characters to engage pre-school children. Also, during 2007, Bill published articles to promote health and well-being amongst regional committees, taking a prominent lead role against childhood obesity. He also instigated the then novel idea of having a sports bus to serve many communities across the county and engage pre-school children in fun exercises. This project was designed to reach socially disadvantaged and thus cut off from the bigger facilities in towns and cities.

In 1989, Bill was awarded a Winston Churchill Study Fellowship to visit both the USA Olympic Training Academy in Colorado and the Australian Sports Institute in Canberra with a view to recommending that the British Government set up a British Institute of Sport based in Sheffield. His fellowship was to study the development of working relationships between doctors, coaches, trainers, sport scientists, physiotherapists, and the practitioners of sport. After a year's research and discussion with athletes, education and sports sciences specialists, it was recommended that the British Institute of Sport should be created. Through Bill's vision and ambition, the institute has today firmly cemented the UK as a world-class showcase for international sport in preparation and competition.

During 1980–1992, Bill Tancred conducted on behalf of the British Amateur Weight Lifting Association (BAWLA) numerous teachers, leaders and instructors award courses. These courses were aimed for school teachers and those working in the Fitness Industry including the Armed Forces. He also undertook weight training courses at Loughborough University summer schools and the Blackpool Easter schools for over ten years helping people to gain the necessary qualifications for their workplace. He co-authored a book, Weight Training for Sport, published by Hodder and Stoughton in 1984.

Tancred has been patron to a number of sports charities to include Suffolk Sports Aid Foundation, Inspire Suffolk and Special Olympic Suffolk. In 2018 Tancred received a Lifetime Achievement Award from Suffolk Sports.

Tancred was also chairman of the Suffolk Sport Board from 2007 until 2014 and remains a visiting professor in sports and exercise science in the University of Suffolk. In addition, he is a popular and respected speaker within the local community, organisations, societies including the sporting memories charity and to the cruise industry, and he has been popular by publishing various podcasts As a former pupil at Causton/Maidstone Infant School Felixstowe Suffolk, a school house was named after him in 2022 (Tancred House). Having lived in Sheffield for 30 years, he moved back to Felixstowe in 2014.

== Honours ==
Tancred was awarded the General Service Medal with Clasp Radfan 1964 for his service in Aden with the 1st East Anglian Regiment. In 1992 he was awarded an MBE for services to athletics. In 2007 he was inducted into the Hall of Fame at West Virginia University, by the College of Physical Activity and Sports Science and in 2008, he was awarded an honorary doctorate by the University of Suffolk. Bill Tancred was also inducted in 2025 into the inaugural College of Applied Human Sciences Hall of Fame at West Virginia University, U.S.A.
