= Masters W50 1500 metres world record progression =

This is the progression of world record improvements of the 1500 metres W50 division of Masters athletics.

Key

Incomplete information Pending

Hand	Auto	Athlete	Nationality	Birthdate	Location	Date
4:40.7		Gitte Karlshøj	Denmark	14.05.1959	Odense	16.05.2009
	4:40.92	Maureen de St. Croix	Canada	26.05.1953	Langley	15.06.2003
	4:43.10	Jutta Pedersen	Sweden	06.12.1946	Sollentuna	01.06.1997
	4:48.26	Barbara Lehmann	Germany	02.04.1942	Munich	06.06.1992
4:49.3		Valborg Ostberg	Norway	14.05.1931	Steinkjer	26.07.1981
4:54.5		Anne McKenzie	South Africa	28.07.1925	Greater Point	15.10.1975
