= Golekane Mosweu =

Botswana long-distance runner

Personal information
- Full name: Golekane Mosweu
- Nationality: Botswana
- Born: 16 August 1948 (age 77)

Sport
- Sport: Long-distance running
- Event: 10,000 metres

Golekane Mosweu (born 16 August 1948) is a Motswana long-distance runner. Initially a labourer at a mine in South Africa, he was recruited to the Botswana national athletics team due to his fitness. He competed in races in South Africa and Rhodesia, as well as the 1974 and 1986 Commonwealth Games.

He was invited to compete for Botswana at the 1980 Summer Olympics in the men's 10,000 metres, becoming one of the first Motswana Olympians. There, he placed twelfth in his heat and did not advance further. After his sporting career, he went back to working in the mines. By 14 September 2024, he was one of the two competitors for Botswana at the 1980 Summer Olympics that were still alive.

== Biography ==
Golekane "George" Mosweu was born on 16 August 1948. Mosweu was initially a labourer who worked in South Africa as a platinum miner from 1966 to 1971. He later moved to Gauteng to work at the Kloof mine (now KDC mine), there he was noticed for his fitness and was recruited for the Motswana national athletics team. He competed in races across Rhodesia and South Africa, and also competed at the 1974 British Commonwealth Games in Christchurch, New Zealand. There, he competed in the men's 5000 metres on 27 January and finished tenth in his heat with a time of 14:46.14.

In a competition at Cape Town, he had set his personal best in the 10,000 metres with a time of 28:41.4 on 29 March 1975. At a subsequent competition the following year, he recorded a time of 13:47.4 in the 5,000 metres, breaking another personal best. He was then invited to compete for the first team for Botswana at the Olympic Games, competing at the 1980 Summer Olympics.

He competed in the third qualifying heat of the men's 10,000 metres on 24 July. He recorded a time of 30:38.8 and placed 12th out of the 15 competitors in his heat. He did not advance to the finals, while the eventual winner of the event was Miruts Yifter of Ethiopia.

After the 1980 Summer Games, he had competed at the 1986 Commonwealth Games. He also competed in a 15 kilometre road race in Cape Town, placing 51st with a time of 45:48. He later went back to working in the mines, working at the mine until 1998. By 14 September 2024, he was one of only two competitors for Botswana at the 1980 Summer Olympics still alive at that time, the other being sprinter Joseph Ramotshabe.
