= Athletics at the 1974 British Commonwealth Games – Men's hammer throw =

Men's hammer throw at the 1974 British Commonwealth Games
- Venue: Queen Elizabeth II Park
- Dates: 25 January

Medalists
gold medal	Ian Chipchase	England
silver medal	Howard Payne	England
bronze medal	Peter Farmer	Australia

The men's hammer throw event at the 1974 British Commonwealth Games was held on 25 January at the Queen Elizabeth II Park in Christchurch, New Zealand.

== Results ==
Final result
Rank	Name	Nationality	Distance	Notes
1st place, gold medalist(s)	Ian Chipchase	England	69.56	
2nd place, silver medalist(s)	Howard Payne	England	68.02	
3rd place, bronze medalist(s)	Peter Farmer	Australia	67.48	
4	Barry Williams	England	66.82	
5	Murray Cheater	New Zealand	65.82	
6	Chris Black	Scotland	64.40	
7	Warwick Nicholl	New Zealand	63.72	
8	Laurie Bryce	Scotland	59.52	
9	Sitiveni Rabuka	Fiji	32.66	
