= Athletics at the 1974 British Commonwealth Games – Men's 800 metres =

Men's 800 metres at the 1974 British Commonwealth Games
- Venue: Queen Elizabeth II Park
- Dates: 27 and 29 January

Medalists
gold medal	John Kipkurgat	Kenya
silver medal	Mike Boit	Kenya
bronze medal	John Walker	New Zealand

The men's 800 metres event at the 1974 British Commonwealth Games was held on 27 and 29 January at the Queen Elizabeth II Park in Christchurch, New Zealand.

== Medallists ==
Medal winners
Gold	Silver	Bronze
John Kipkurgat; Kenya	Mike Boit; Kenya	John Walker; New Zealand

== Results ==
=== Heats ===
Held on 27 January

==== Qualification for semifinal ====
The first 4 in each heat (Q) qualified directly for the semifinals.

Heats results
Rank	Heat	Name	Nationality	Time	Notes
1	1	Filbert Bayi	Tanzania	1:47.1	Q
2	1	Andy Carter	England	1:48.5	Q
3	1	Peter Watson	Australia	1:49.18	Q
4	1	Alan Gilmour	New Zealand	1:51.3	Q
5	1	Keith Falla	Guernsey	1:52.16	
6	1	Phillip Kayo	Papua New Guinea	1:53.96	
7	1	John Rantao	Botswana	1:59.52	
1	2	John Kipkurgat	Kenya	1:48.2	Q
2	2	Bill Hooker	Australia	1:49.91	Q
3	2	Samuel Ditsele	Botswana	1:50.1	Q
4	2	Colin Campbell	England	1:50.2	Q
5	2	Jaiye Abidoye	Nigeria	1:50.86	
6	2	Gerard Gangaram	Mauritius	1:55.27	
7	2	Samuela Bulai	Fiji	1:55.48	
1	3	John Walker	New Zealand	1:47.8	Q
2	3	Daniel Omwanza	Kenya	1:48.0	Q
3	3	Phil Lewis	Wales	1:48.3	Q
4	3	David McMeekin	Scotland	1:49.1	Q
5	3	Richard Kermode	Fiji	1:49.81	
6	3	Joseph Jampilda	Nigeria	1:51.94	
1	4	Mike Boit	Kenya	1:49.0	Q
2	4	Graeme Rootham	Australia	1:49.56	Q
3	4	Peter Browne	England	1:50.5	Q
4	4	Kenneth Elmer	Canada	1:50.8	Q
5	4	Stuart Melville	New Zealand	1:52.11	
6	4	Jacques Bazerd	Mauritius	1:57.03	

=== Semifinals ===
Held on 27 January

==== Qualification for final ====
The first 4 in each semifinal (Q) qualified directly for the final.

Final result
Rank	Heat	Name	Nationality	Time	Notes
1	1	John Kipkurgat	Kenya	1:44.38	Q
2	1	Andy Carter	England	1:45.57	Q
3	1	Daniel Omwanza	Kenya	1:46.2	Q
4	1	Phil Lewis	Wales	1:46.26	Q
5	1	Graeme Rootham	Australia	1:47.19	
6	1	Peter Watson	Australia	1:48.56	
7	1	Kenneth Elmer	Canada	1:50.76	
8	1	Alan Gilmour	New Zealand	1:57.78	
1	2	Mike Boit	Kenya	1:45.40	Q
2	2	John Walker	New Zealand	1:46.2	Q
3	2	Bill Hooker	Australia	1:46.44	Q
4	2	Filbert Bayi	Tanzania	1:46.6	Q
5	2	David McMeekin	Scotland	1:48.13	
6	2	Peter Browne	England	1:49.10	
7	2	Samuel Ditsele	Botswana	1:50.52	
8	2	Colin Campbell	England	1:51.64	

=== Final ===
Held on 29 January

Final result
Rank	Name	Nationality	Time	Notes
1st place, gold medalist(s)	John Kipkurgat	Kenya	1:43.91	GR
2nd place, silver medalist(s)	Mike Boit	Kenya	1:44.39	
3rd place, bronze medalist(s)	John Walker	New Zealand	1:44.92	
4	Filbert Bayi	Tanzania	1:45.32	
5	Andy Carter	England	1:45.97	
6	Bill Hooker	Australia	1:46.75	
7	Daniel Omwanza	Kenya	1:47.66	
8	Phil Lewis	Wales	1:48.90	
