= Maurie Gordon =

New Zealand sport shooter (1926–2016)

Personal information
- Born: Maurice George Gordon; 2 April 1926 Napier, New Zealand
- Died: 29 June 2016 (aged 90) Havelock North, New Zealand
- Occupation: Beekeeper
- Spouse: Cynthia Weekes (m. 1948; died 1993)
- Children: 3

Sport
- Country: New Zealand
- Sport: Shooting
- Club: Okawa Rifle Club; Hawke's Bay Rifle Club

Achievements and titles
- National finals: Ballinger Belt winner (1951, 1953, 1970)
Medal record
Shooting
Representing New Zealand
British Empire and Commonwealth Games
| Gold medal – first place | 1974 Christchurch | Fullbore rifle |

Maurice George Gordon (2 April 1926 – 29 June 2016) was a New Zealand competitive rifle shooter who won a gold medal representing his country at the 1974 British Commonwealth Games in Christchurch.

== Early life and family ==
Born in Napier on 2 April 1926, Gordon was the son of Molly Gordon and her husband, George Gordon, a butcher. He left school when he was 13, joining his father's beekeeping business. In 1948, Goron married Cynthia Weekes, and the couple went on to have three children.

== Shooting ==
Gordon won the Ballinger Belt at the New Zealand rifle shooting championships, representing the Okawa Rifle Club, on three occasions: in 1951, 1953 and 1970. He finished second on a further four occasions.

He also represented his country at three Commonwealth Games in the individual fullbore rifle competition. At the 1974 British Commonwealth Games he won the gold medal, while he placed sixth at both the 1966 British Empire and Commonwealth Games and 1978 Commonwealth Games.

Gordon represented New Zealand in the Kolapore Match at the NRA Imperial Meeting in 1953, and as a coach in 1960, 1967 and 1976. In 1976, he won the St George's Vase at the Imperial Meeting at Bisley, the first New Zealander to do so.

Gordon was a mentor to John Hastie when the latter began long-range target shooting at the Okawa Rifle Club in the 1960s. Gordon died in Havelock North on 29 June 2016.

== Later life and death ==
Gordon took over the family beekeeping business after his father's death in 1977, and retired in 1984. He died at Havelock North on 29 June 2016, having been predeceased by his wife, Cynthia, in 1993. His ashes were buried in Hastings Cemetery.
