= Athletics at the 1974 British Commonwealth Games – Men's 3000 metres steeplechase =

Men's 3000 metres steeplechase at the 1974 British Commonwealth Games
- Venue: Queen Elizabeth II Park
- Dates: 26 January

Medalists
| gold medal | Ben Jipcho | Kenya |
| silver medal | John Davies | Wales |
| bronze medal | Evans Mogaka | Kenya |

The men's 3000 metres steeplechase event at the 1974 British Commonwealth Games was held on 26 January at the Queen Elizabeth II Park in Christchurch, New Zealand.

== Results ==
Final result
| Rank | Name | Nationality | Time | Notes |
|---|---|---|---|---|
| 1st place, gold medalist(s) | Ben Jipcho | Kenya | 8:20.67 | GR |
| 2nd place, silver medalist(s) | John Davies | Wales | 8:24.8 | |
| 3rd place, bronze medalist(s) | Evans Mogaka | Kenya | 8:28.51 | |
| 4 | John Bicourt | England | 8:29.6 | |
| 5 | Euan Robertson | New Zealand | 8:35.2 | |
| 6 | Bernard Hayward | Wales | 8:36.2 | |
| 7 | Stephen Hollings | England | 8:40.4 | |
| 8 | Amos Biwott | Kenya | 8:41.4 | |
| 9 | Bob Hendy | Australia | 8:46.0 | |
| 10 | Nathan Healey | New Zealand | 8:52.2 | |
| 11 | Howard Healey | New Zealand | 8:52.4 | |
| 12 | Justin Edwogu | Uganda | 9:01.0 | |
| 13 | Joseph Doherty | Nigeria | 9:23.8 | |
