= Athletics at the 1974 British Commonwealth Games – Women's shot put =

Women's shot put at the Commonwealth Games

The women's shot put event at the 1974 British Commonwealth Games was held on 27 January at the Queen Elizabeth II Park in Christchurch, New Zealand.

== Medalists ==
Gold	Silver	Bronze
Jane Haist; Canada	Valerie Young; New Zealand	Jean Roberts; Australia

== Results ==
=== Qualification ===
Rank	Name	Nationality	Result	Notes
	Jean Roberts	Australia	14.78	
	Gael Martin	Australia	13.14	
	Dorothy Swinyard	England	12.96	
13	Betty Akello	Uganda	12.73	
14	Joyce Aciro	Uganda	12.20	
15	Meg Ritchie	Scotland	11.97	
16	Losaline Faka'ata	Tonga	11.81	
17	Herina Malit	Kenya	11.75	
18	Rose Chamangwana	Malawi	10.97	
19	Mereoni Vibose	Fiji	10.96	
20	Rose Hart	Ghana	10.67	

=== Final ===
Held on 27 January.

Rank	Name	Nationality	Result	Notes
1st place, gold medalist(s)	Jane Haist	Canada	16.12	
2nd place, silver medalist(s)	Valerie Young	New Zealand	15.29	
3rd place, bronze medalist(s)	Jean Roberts	Australia	15.24	
4	Mary Peters	Northern Ireland	14.88	
5	Barbara Beable	New Zealand	14.60	
6	Brenda Bedford	England	14.48	
7	Rosemary Payne	Scotland	14.19	
8	Diane Konihowski	Canada	14.15	
9	Evelyn Okeke	Nigeria	13.81	
10	Gael Martin	Australia	13.57	
11	Carol Martin	Canada	13.40	
	Dorothy Swinyard	England	DNS	
