= Wendy Brown (sprinter) =

New Zealand sprinter

Wendy Brown MBE
Personal information
- Born: Wendy Lee Urquhart; 21 November 1950 (age 75) New Plymouth, New Zealand
- Spouse: Ian Brown (m. 1971)

Sport
- Country: New Zealand
- Sport: Track and field

Achievements and titles
- National finals: 100 m champion (1971, 1973, 1974, 1981); 200 m champion (1973, 1981)
Medal record
Women's athletics
Representing New Zealand
Pacific Conference Games
Silver medal – second place	1973 Toronto	100 m
Bronze medal – third place	1973 Canberra	100 m

Wendy Lee Brown MBE (née Urquhart, born 21 November 1950) is a former New Zealand sprinter. She represented her country at the 1974 and 1978 Commonwealth Games, Brown was selected for the 1982 Commonwealth Games but withdrew from the team due to injury. Brown was the New Zealand record-holder over 100 and 200 meters between 1974 and 1985. She won six New Zealand national sprinting titles between 1971 and 1981.

== Early life and family ==
Brown was born Wendy Lee Urquhart in New Plymouth on 21 November 1950, and was educated at New Plymouth Girls' High School. She then studied at Palmerston North Teachers' College, where she completed a Diploma of Teaching in 1970, and became a schoolteacher.

In 1971, she married Ian Brown, and the couple had two children.

== Athletics ==
Brown won the New Zealand national women's 100 m title four times, in 1971, 1973, 1974, and 1981; and the 200 m championship twice, in 1973 and 1981. As of 2019, her times in winning the 100 m and 200 m titles in 1981, 11.40 s and 23.06 s, respectively, remain championship records. She broke the New Zealand 100-meter and 200-meter national records in 1974 and held them both until 1985.

Brown represented New Zealand at the 1973 Pacific Conference Games in Toronto, winning the silver medal in the women's 100 meters. Four years later, at the 1977 Pacific Conference Games, she won bronze in the same event.

At the 1974 British Commonwealth Games, Brown competed in the 100 m and 200 m sprints, and the 4 x 100 metres relay. In the 100 meters, she finished fifth in the final, posting a time of 11.59 seconds, while in the 200 meters, she recorded a time of 23.44 seconds in placing sixth. She was a member of the New Zealand quartet, with Brenda Matthews, Gail Wooten and Kim Robertson, that was fifth in the 4 x 100 meters relay with a time of 44.68 seconds.

Brown represented New Zealand in the same three events at the 1978 Commonwealth Games in Edmonton. Alongside Gail Wooten, Kim Robertson, and Penny Hunt, she was fourth in the final of the 4 x 100 m relay, in a time of 45.06 seconds. In the 100 meters, she recorded a time of 11.84 seconds in her heat and did not progress, while in the 200 meters she ran 23.64 seconds in her semifinal and did not qualify for the final.

In the 1983 New Year Honours, Brown was appointed a Member of the Order of the British Empire for services to athletics.

1997 World Masters Athletic Champs in Durban, South Africa, Brown won the W45 100m in 12.87, won the W45 200m in 26.56. Member of NZ W45 4 x 100m placed 2nd, W45 4x 400m, placed 3rd.

2001 World Masters Athletic Champs, Brisbane, Australia. Brown won the W50 100m in 13.22, won the W50 200m in 27.37. Member of NZ W50 4 x 100m, placed 3rd.

== Other activities ==
Between 1986 and 1988, Brown was a member of the Rodney College Board of Governors, and from 1989 to 1991 she was the vice chair of the Rodney College Board of Trustees.
