= Athletics at the 1974 British Commonwealth Games – Women's 100 metres =

Women's 100 metres at the 1974 British Commonwealth Games
- Venue: Queen Elizabeth II Park
- Dates: 25 and 26 January

Medalists
gold medal	Raelene Boyle	Australia
silver medal	Andrea Lynch	England
bronze medal	Denise Robertson	Australia

The women's 100 metres event at the 1974 British Commonwealth Games was held on 25 and 26 January at the Queen Elizabeth II Park in Christchurch, New Zealand.

== Medallists ==
Medal winners
Gold	Silver	Bronze
Raelene Boyle; Australia	Andrea Lynch; England	Denise Robertson; Australia

== Results ==
=== Heats ===
Held on 25 January

==== Qualification for semifinal ====
The first 3 in each heat (Q) and the next 1 fastest (q) qualified for the semifinals.

==== Wind speed ====
Heat 1: ? m/s, Heat 2: ? m/s, Heat 3: +0.6 m/s, Heat 4: -0.3 m/s, Heat 5: +1.7 m/s

Heats results
Rank	Heat	Name	Nationality	Time	Notes
1	1	Rosie Allwood	Jamaica	11.7	Q
2	1	Etim Ufon-Uko	Nigeria	12.0	Q
3	1	Sonia Lannaman	England	12.0	Q
4	1	Rose Asiedua	Ghana	12.22	
5	1	Christine Byobona	Uganda	12.43	
6	1	Christine Salmond	Scotland	12.44	
4	2	Alison MacRitchie	Scotland	12.14	
5	2	Linda McCurry	Northern Ireland	12.37	
6	2	Keta Iongi	Tonga	12.49	
7	2	Torika Cavuka	Fiji	12.67	
1	3	Marjorie Bailey	Canada	11.7	Q
2	3	Jenny Lamy	Australia	11.73	Q
3	3	Helen Golden	Scotland	11.9	Q
4	3	Kim Robertson	New Zealand	12.06	
5	3	Beatrice Ewuzie	Nigeria	12.25	
6	3	Debbie Jones	Bermuda	12.34	
7	3	Laisa Taga	Fiji	13.13	
1	4	Denise Robertson	Australia	11.58	Q
2	4	Patty Loverock	Canada	11.7	Q
3	4	Hannah Afriye	Ghana	11.9	Q
4	4	Gail Wooten	New Zealand	11.9	q
5	4	Marcia Trotman	Barbados	12.13	
6	4	Ashanti Obi	Nigeria	12.26	
7	4	Philomena Chezi	Tanzania	12.41	
1	5	Raelene Boyle	Australia	11.51	Q
2	5	Lyn Kellond	Canada	11.9	Q
3	5	Leleith Hodges	Jamaica	11.9	Q
4	5	Barbara Martin	England	12.07	
5	5	Nzaeli Kyomo	Tanzania	12.25	
6	5	Avril McClelland	Northern Ireland	12.33	
7	5	Uafu Tuineau	Tonga	13.01	

=== Semifinals ===
Held on 25 January

==== Qualification for final ====
The first 4 in each semifinal (Q) qualified directly for the final.

==== Wind speed ====
Heat 1: -0.5 m/s, Heat 2: +0.4 m/s

Semifinal result
Rank	Heat	Name	Nationality	Time	Notes
1	1	Alice Annum	Ghana	11.5	Q
2	1	Denise Robertson	Australia	11.49	Q
3	1	Marjorie Bailey	Canada	11.7	Q
4	1	Jenny Lamy	Australia	11.72	Q
5	1	Etim Ufon-Uko	Nigeria	11.86	
6	1	Gail Wooten	New Zealand	11.88	
7	1	Sonia Lannaman	England	11.93	
8	1	Leleith Hodges	Jamaica	12.98	
1	2	Andrea Lynch	England	11.39	Q
2	2	Raelene Boyle	Australia	11.54	Q
3	2	Wendy Brown	New Zealand	11.6	Q
4	2	Rosie Allwood	Jamaica	11.6	Q
5	2	Patty Loverock	Canada	11.70	
6	2	Hannah Afriye	Ghana	11.89	
7	2	Helen Golden	Scotland	11.92	
8	2	Lyn Kellond	Canada	12.05	

=== Final ===
Held on 26 January

==== Wind speed ====
+0.5 m/s

Final result
Rank	Lane	Name	Nationality	Time	Notes
1st place, gold medalist(s)	5	Raelene Boyle	Australia	11.27	GR
2nd place, silver medalist(s)	6	Andrea Lynch	England	11.31	
3rd place, bronze medalist(s)	1	Denise Robertson	Australia	11.50	
4	7	Alice Annum	Ghana	11.52	
5	4	Wendy Brown	New Zealand	11.59	
6	8	Marjorie Bailey	Canada	11.66	
7	2	Rosie Allwood	Jamaica	11.73	
8	3	Jenny Lamy	Australia	11.83	
