= Athletics at the 1974 British Commonwealth Games – Men's discus throw =

British Commonwealth sporting event

Men's discus throw at the 1974 British Commonwealth Games
- Dates: 31 January

Medalists
gold medal	Robin Tait	New Zealand
silver medal	Bill Tancred	England
bronze medal	John Hillier	England

The men's discus throw event at the 1974 British Commonwealth Games was held on 31 January at the Queen Elizabeth II Park in Christchurch, New Zealand.

== Results ==
Final result
Rank	Name	Nationality	Distance	Notes
1st place, gold medalist(s)	Robin Tait	New Zealand	63.08	GR
2nd place, silver medalist(s)	Bill Tancred	England	59.48	
3rd place, bronze medalist(s)	John Hillier	England	57.22	
4	Ainsley Roost	Canada	56.70	
5	Geoff Capes	England	51.84	
6	Samuel Onyac	Uganda	49.68	
7}	Tony Satchwell	Jersey	48.74	
8	Thomas Gibure	Tanzania	44.40	
9	Walter Okello	Uganda	42.16	
10	Sitiveni Rabuka	Fiji	34.98	
	Chris Black	Scotland	DNS	
