= Mary Stewart (runner) =

British runner (born 1956)

Personal information
- Nationality: British (Scottish/English)
- Born: 25 February 1956 (age 70) Birmingham, England
- Height: 168 cm (5 ft 6 in)
- Weight: 61 kg (134 lb)

Sport
- Sport: Athletics
- Event: middle-distance
- Club: Birchfield Harriers
Medal record
Women's athletics
Representing England
Commonwealth Games
Gold medal – first place	1978 Edmonton	1500m
Representing Great Britain
European Athletics Indoor Championships
Gold medal – first place	1977 San Sebastián	1500 m

Mary Stewart (Cotton), (born 25 February 1956 in Birmingham) is a female retired middle-distance runner who competed at the 1976 Summer Olympics.

== Biography ==
Stewart was the 1973 Scottish champion and aged 18 at the time, represented the Scotland team at the 1974 British Commonwealth Games, participating in the 1500 metres event. A member of the Birchfield Harriers, Stewart became the British 1500 metres champion after winning the British WAAA Championships title at the 1975 WAAA Championships.

Stewart competed in the 1500 metres at the 1976 Olympics Games in Montreal, finishing in fourth place in her semi-final race and just failing to qualify for the final.

Stewart won the gold medal in the 1500 metres at the 1977 European Indoor Championship in San Sebastián and represented England and winning a gold medal in the 1,500 metres event, at the 1978 Commonwealth Games in Edmonton, Alberta, Canada.

In 1979, Stewart regained the 1500m WAAA title at the 1979 WAAA Championships.

== Personal life ==
She is the younger sister of the Scottish athletes Ian Stewart and Peter Stewart, the family having moved from Musselburgh to Birmingham, England in 1948.
