= Brian Duffy (weightlifter) =

New Zealand weightlifter

Personal information
- Born: Brian Duffy

Sport
- Country: New Zealand
- Sport: Weightlifting
- Coached by: Jock Morrison
Medal record
Representing New Zealand
Men's weightlifting
British Commonwealth Games
Bronze medal – third place	1974 Christchurch	Featherweight

Brian Duffy is a former New Zealand weightlifter from Canterbury. He won the bronze medal in the featherweight division representing his country at the 1974 British Commonwealth Games in Christchurch.
