= John Coutts (swimmer) =

New Zealand swimmer

Personal information
- Born: John William Coutts; 14 August 1955 (age 71) Marton, New Zealand

Sport
- Country: New Zealand
- Sport: Swimming
Medal record
Men's swimming
Representing New Zealand
Commonwealth Games
| Bronze medal – third place | 1974 Christchurch | 200 m butterfly |

John William Coutts (born 14 August 1955) is a former New Zealand swimmer.

Coutts was born in Marton in 1955, and grew up in Hastings. He received his education at Hastings Central, Hastings Intermediate, and Hastings Boys' High Schools. Coutts was the first person to swim Cook Strait in both directions.

Coutts won a bronze medal in the 200 m butterfly at the 1974 British Commonwealth Games in Christchurch, New Zealand. He competed at the 1975 World Aquatics Championships in Cali, Colombia. He represented New Zealand at the 1976 Summer Olympics, competing in the 100 m butterfly and 200 m butterfly.

Coutts was formerly a director of Carlile Swimming, the largest private swimming school in the world, originally set up by Australian swimming legend Forbes Carlile and his wife Ursula Carlile.

At age 16, he was voted Hawke's Bay Sportsperson of the Year in 1972. In June 2012, he was inducted into the Hawke's Bay's Sports Hall of Fame. He is married to Sally, and they have four children. Coutts and his wife live in Australia.
