= Athletics at the 1974 British Commonwealth Games – Women's long jump =

Women's long jump at the Commonwealth Games

The women's long jump event at the 1974 British Commonwealth Games was held on 29 and 31 January at the Queen Elizabeth II Park in Christchurch, New Zealand.

== Medalists ==
Gold	Silver	Bronze
Modupe Oshikoya; Nigeria	Brenda Eisler; Canada	Ruth Martin-Jones; Wales

== Results ==
=== Qualification ===
Held on 29 January.

Rank	Name	Nationality	Result	Notes
	Lyn Tillett	Australia	6.17	
	Erica Nixon	Australia	6.13	
	Susan New	Australia	5.78	
13	Diane Konihowski	Canada	5.73	
14	Kathy Otto	New Zealand	5.65	
15	Josephine Ocran	Ghana	5.56	
16	Beatrice Emodi	Nigeria	5.54	
17	Torika Cavuka	Fiji	4.96	
18	Laisa Taga	Fiji	4.60	

=== Final ===
Held on 31 January.

Rank	Name	Nationality	Result	Notes
1st place, gold medalist(s)	Modupe Oshikoya	Nigeria	6.46	
2nd place, silver medalist(s)	Brenda Eisler	Canada	6.38	
3rd place, bronze medalist(s)	Ruth Martin-Jones	Wales	6.38	
4	Myra Nimmo	Scotland	6.34	
5	Lyn Tillett	Australia	6.30	
6	Erica Nixon	Australia	6.25	
7	Sheila Sherwood	England	6.21	
8	Maureen Chitty	England	6.20	
9	Pamela Hendren	New Zealand	6.11	
10	Susan New	Australia	5.59	
11	Susan Burnside	New Zealand	5.58	
12	Ann Wilson	England	5.51	
