= Warwick Nicholl =

New Zealand hammer thrower

Warwick Nicholl was a New Zealand athlete and representative hammer thrower.

Nicholl set several New Zealand hammer throw records, the first of which the claimed in 1967, with a throw of 54.7 meters. He competed in the 1970 British Commonwealth Games, achieving sixth place in the hammer throw event with a throw of 60.02 meters, setting another New Zealand record.

At the 1974 British Commonwealth Games, he again competed in the hammer throw event, achieving seventh place with a throw of 63.72 meters. He was his country's flagbearer at the opening ceremony.

Nicholl served in the New Zealand Police between 1964 and 1998.
