= John Dean (cyclist) =

New Zealand cyclist (born 1947)

Personal information
- Born: 22 December 1947 (age 78) New Plymouth, New Zealand

Cycling career
- Sport: Cycling

John Dean (born 22 December 1947) is a New Zealand former cyclist. He competed at the 1968 Summer Olympics and the 1972 Summer Olympics.

He won the overall sportsperson of the year award at the Taranaki Sports Awards in 1966 and was named the 1967 Road Cyclist of the Year at the annual meeting in Wellington of the New Zealand Amateur Cycling Association. Dean also won the New Zealand National Road Race Championships in 1967.
