= Dorothy Swinyard =

British discus thrower and shot putter

Personal information
- Nationality: English
- Born: 17 February 1951 (age 74) Tynemouth, Northumberland

Dorothy Joan Swinyard married name Dorothy Chipchase (born 17 February 1951) is a female former athlete who competed for England.

== Athletics career ==
Swinyard was the 1973 Scottish champion in the discus.

She represented England in the discus and shot put events, at the 1974 British Commonwealth Games in Christchurch, New Zealand.

== Personal life ==
She is married to the hammer thrower Ian Chipchase.
