= Bruce McMillan (sport shooter) =

New Zealand sport shooter

Personal information
- Born: 29 June 1942 (age 82); Lower Hutt, New Zealand

Sport
- Sport: Sports shooting

Bruce McMillan (born 29 June 1942) is a New Zealand former sports shooter. He competed in the 25 metre pistol event at the 1972 Summer Olympics.
