= Allison Calder =

New Zealand swimmer

Personal information
- Born: 2 April 1960 Dunedin, New Zealand
- Died: 10 October 2002 (aged 42) Christchurch, New Zealand

Sport
- Sport: Swimming

Allison Calder (2 April 1960 – 10 October 2002) was a former swimming representative from New Zealand. She competed at the 1976 Summer Olympics and the 1974 Commonwealth Games. Calder was one of a number of swimming stars coached under Duncan Laing in Dunedin. She died in her sleep of unknown causes in 2002.

== Career ==
Calder swum at the 1974 Commonwealth Games in Christchurch, New Zealand. Calder raced in the 200m, 400m and 800m Freestyle with her best finish being a 6th in the 800m Freestyle. Calder also was part of the 4x100 Freestyle Relay which finished in 5th place.

As a sixteen-year-old, Calder attended the 1976 Olympics held in Montreal where she placed 11th in the 800m Freestyle and 15th in the 400m Freestyle.
