= Dreams and Teams =

Dreams and Teams is an international programme funded by British Council and UK’s Youth Sports Trust aiming to develop leadership skills among international young leaders around the globe, through sports.

== Description ==
Active in 40 countries, Dreams and Teams has become a platform for young leaders to plan, organise and deliver sports festivals for young people. In 2005, Malaysian young leaders in collaboration with UK young leaders organised an environmental project called “Mangrove replanting – One student One Tree” which was officiated by Suzanna Galvan the then Director of Education and Training British Council Malaysia.

The event received coverage by nation’s TV1 and was mentioned in national and local newspapers. Dreams + Teams encourages young leaders to work with their international counterparts via e-mail, video conferencing and face-to-face contact.

== Ukraine ==
Ukraine is taking part in Dreams and Teams program. Leader is a young student - Margerita Zhukova.

== Cameroon ==
Located in Central Africa, the Leader was Njoukoumbe Christian Didier between 2009 and 2010. He represented his school G.B.H.S Bafoussam in the U.K in 2010 to represent Cameroon at Oakbank School Keigley and created many activities for the club and with his creative and inspiring leadership attitude made great things for the club in collaboration with his school teammates before he went to start College and obviously other projects. Some of the activities led by Njoukoumbe in his group were usually covered by TV channels as: Samba TV, Equinoxe TV, many more in the school premises, at the Bafoussam Urban Council and in the Streets of Bafoussam. The Collaboration Between G.B.H.S Bafoussam and OakBank School was very positive for both students and pupils in secondary and primary schools, respectively. Other schools who used to take part in the Dreams + Teams in Cameroon were in Ebolowa and Bamenda.
