= Tony Ebert =

New Zealand weightlifter (born 1947)

Personal information
- Born: 14 February 1947 (age 79) Christchurch, New Zealand
- Height: 1.73 m (5 ft 8 in)
- Weight: 75 kg (165 lb)

Sport
- Country: New Zealand
- Sport: Weightlifting
- Coached by: Jock Morrison
Medal record
Commonwealth Games
| Gold medal – first place | 1974 Christchurch | 75 kg |
| Silver medal – second place | 1970 Edinburgh | 75 kg |

Anthony John Ebert (born 14 February 1947) is a former weightlifter for New Zealand.

He won the gold medal at the 1974 British Commonwealth Games in the men's middleweight. Four years earlier at the 1970 British Commonwealth Games he won the silver medal in the same grade.

He represented New Zealand at the 1972 Summer Olympics finishing 17th in the men's middleweight.
