= Rory Barrett =

New Zealand weightlifter (born 1945)

Personal information
- Nationality: New Zealand
- Born: 31 December 1945 (age 79); Mumbai, India

Sport
- Sport: Weightlifting

John Rory Barrett (born 31 December 1945) is a New Zealand weightlifter. He competed in the men's heavyweight event at the 1976 Summer Olympics. Barrett was a teacher at Lynfield College in the 1970s.
