= Jannette Roscoe =

British sprinter (born 1946)

Jannette Roscoe née Champion
Personal information
- Nationality: British (English)
- Born: 10 June 1946 (age 80) Royal Tunbridge Wells, England
- Height: 169 cm (5 ft 7 in)
- Weight: 56 kg (123 lb)

Sport
- Sport: Athletics
- Event: Sprinting/400 metres
- Club: Stretford AC
Medal record
Athletics
Representing Great Britain
Summer Universiade
| Bronze medal – third place | 1967 Tokyo | 200m |
Representing England
Commonwealth Games
| Gold medal – first place | 1974 Christchurch | 4x400m relay |

Jannette Veronica Roscoe (née Champion; born 10 June 1946) is a female British retired sprinter who competed at two Olympic Games.

== Biography ==
Champion, born with two sets of six toes, grew up in Hale, Greater Manchester and in June 1970 taught at Weaverham Secondary School.

Champion represented England in the 400 metres, at the 1970 British Commonwealth Games in Edinburgh, Scotland. Shortly after the Commonwealth Games, Champion married Dennis Roscoe, a discus athlete, was from Woodland Avenue, Widnes Cheshire. on 19 August 1970 at Altrincham and competed under her married name thereafter.

Roscoe became the British 400 metres champion after winning the British WAAA Championships title at the 1971 WAAA Championships.

At the 1972 Olympics Games in Munich, she represented Great Britain, Roscoe competed in the women's 400 metres.

She lived at 102 Leicester Road in Fleckney in Leicestershire. Both her and her husband were teachers, where they drank 49 pints of milk a week - one pint at each meal, on a diet with lots of meat and cheese. She ate one pound of meat each day. Their food cost £8 a week. But Kraft Foods had sponsored the Olympic team, giving £2 of cheese a week to the 139 athletes. The couple found it difficult to afford their food each week. She trained 10 hours a week at Saffron Lane sports ground, and he trained 10 hours a week. At the weekend they trained at Loughborough, and in Charnwood Forest. If they lived in Germany, as an A-class athlete, she would receive £100 a month funding, and as a B-class athlete, he would receive £70 a month. She taught PE at Countesthorpe College. The village parish council offered to fund their food.

Roscoe regained the 400 metres title at the 1973 WAAA Championships.

Roscoe represented England and won a gold medal in the women's 4 × 400 metres relay with Ruth Kennedy, Sue Pettett and Verona Bernard, at the 1974 British Commonwealth Games in Christchurch, New Zealand.

At the 1976 Olympics Games in Montreal, she represented Great Britain in the 4 × 400 metres Relay.

By 1977 she was teaching PE at Trent Polytechnic, and by 1978 she was at Widnes. She taught Widnes Sixth Form College, now Riverside College, Widnes.
