= John Davies (steeplechase runner) =

Welsh athlete

Personal information
- Born: 20 November 1952 (age 73) Llwynypia, Wales

Sport
- Country: Great Britain; Wales
- Sport: Athletics
- Events: Middle-distance running 3000 metres steeplechase
Medal record
Representing Wales
British Commonwealth Games
Silver medal – second place	1974 Christchurch	3000 m steeplechase

John Davies (born 20 November 1952) is a Welsh former athlete.

Born in the Welsh village of Llwynypia, Davies was a member of the Thames Valley Harriers and became British national champion for the 3000 metres steeplechase in 1974. He was a Welsh record holder in that event.

Davies claimed a surprise silver medal for Wales in the 3000 metres steeplechase at the 1974 British Commonwealth Games in Christchurch, where he had not been considered a serious contender for a podium spot. Due to a last lap collision he had with bronze medalist Evans Mogaka, Davies was disqualified after the race but on appeal was reinstated his silver medal after judges viewed the tape and ruled the contact was accidental.
