= Athletics at the 1974 British Commonwealth Games – Men's 20 miles walk =

Men's 20 miles walk at the 1974 British Commonwealth Games
- Venue: Christchurch
- Dates: 29 January

Medalists
gold medal	John Warhurst	England
silver medal	Roy Thorpe	England
bronze medal	Peter Fullager	Australia

The men's 20 mile walk event at the 1974 British Commonwealth Games was held on 29 January in Christchurch, New Zealand.

== Results ==
Final result
Rank	Name	Nationality	Time	Notes
1st place, gold medalist(s)	John Warhurst	England	2:35:23.0	
2nd place, silver medalist(s)	Roy Thorpe	England	2:39:02.2	
3rd place, bronze medalist(s)	Peter Fullager	Australia	2:42:08.2	
4	Graham Young	Isle of Man	2:42:55.2	
5	Ian Hodgkinson	Australia	2:44:55.4	
6	Les Stevenson	New Zealand	2:46:56.2	
7	Ross Haywood	Australia	2:50:56.0	
8	John Callow	Isle of Man	2:53:12.2	
9	Len Duquemin	Guernsey	2:53:37.4	
10	John Moullin	Guernsey	2:57:27.2	
11	Robin Waterman	Guernsey	3:00:14.2	
12	Derek Harrison	Isle of Man	3:00:32.4	
	Carl Lawton	England	DNF	
	Elisha Kasuku	Kenya	DNF	
	Kevin Taylor	New Zealand	DQ	
