= Graham May =

New Zealand weightlifter (1952–2006)

Medal record

Representing New Zealand

Men's weightlifting

Commonwealth Games
Gold medal – first place	1974 Christchurch	110 kg

Graham John May (1952 – 23 December 2006) was a weightlifting competitor for New Zealand.

He won the gold medal at the 1974 Commonwealth Games in the men's 110 kg division. He is widely known for falling on his face during a lift prior to his gold medal-winning effort. During the failed lift he fell forward with the weights rolling off the platform and into the judges area. The footage of his fall was part of the introduction to the Wide World of Sports for 20 years and is seen as iconic footage of New Zealand sport.

After a short career he stopped weightlifting in 1975 and followed Christianity. In a TV documentary in 1989, he admitted to taking performance enhancing steroids in the years leading up to his gold medal performance, although they were not illegal at the time. He offered to hand back his medal but it was declined.
