= Mwinga Mwanjala =

Tanzanian middle-distance runner

Personal information
- Nationality: Tanzanian
- Born: 13 January 1960 (age 66)

Sport
- Sport: Middle-distance running
- Event: 800 metres

Mwinga Mwanjala (born 13 January 1960) is a Tanzanian middle-distance runner. She competed in the women's 800 metres at the 1980 Summer Olympics. She was the first woman to represent Tanzania at the Olympics.
