= Graham Crouch =

Australian athlete (1948–2019)

Personal information
- Nationality: Australian
- Born: 11 January 1948 Ballarat, Australia
- Died: 28 November 2019 (aged 71) Lengenfeld, Sachsen, Germany
- Height: 170 cm (5 ft 7 in)
- Weight: 58 kg (128 lb)

Sport
- Sport: Athletics
- Event: middle-distance
- Club: Box Hill Athletic Club

Graham Crouch (11 January 1948 – 28 November 2019) was an Australian former middle-distance runner who competed in the 1976 Summer Olympics.

== Biography ==
Crouch was a member of the Box Hill Athletics Club and won the 1500m at the 1968/69 and 1977/78 Australian Athletics Championship. He also won 5000 m at 1975/76 Championships.

Crouch's fifth place run in the classic 1974 Commonwealth Games 1500m established a new Australian record, breaking that set by Herb Elliot at the 1960 Olympic Games.

Later that year in July, Crouch finished second behind Tony Waldrop in the 1500 metres event at the British 1974 AAA Championships.

He was married and lived in Lengenfeld (Germany). In the last week of November 2019 he lost his fight with cancer.

== Major Competitions ==
Competition	Event	Placing
1969 Pacific Conference Games	1500 m	7th
1973 Pacific Conference Games	1500 m	4th
1974 Commonwealth Games	1500 m	5th
1976 Summer Olympics	1500 m	8th
1977 Pacific Conference Games	1500 m 5000 m	2nd 4th
