= Sheila Carey =

British middle-distance runner

Sheila Carey née Taylor
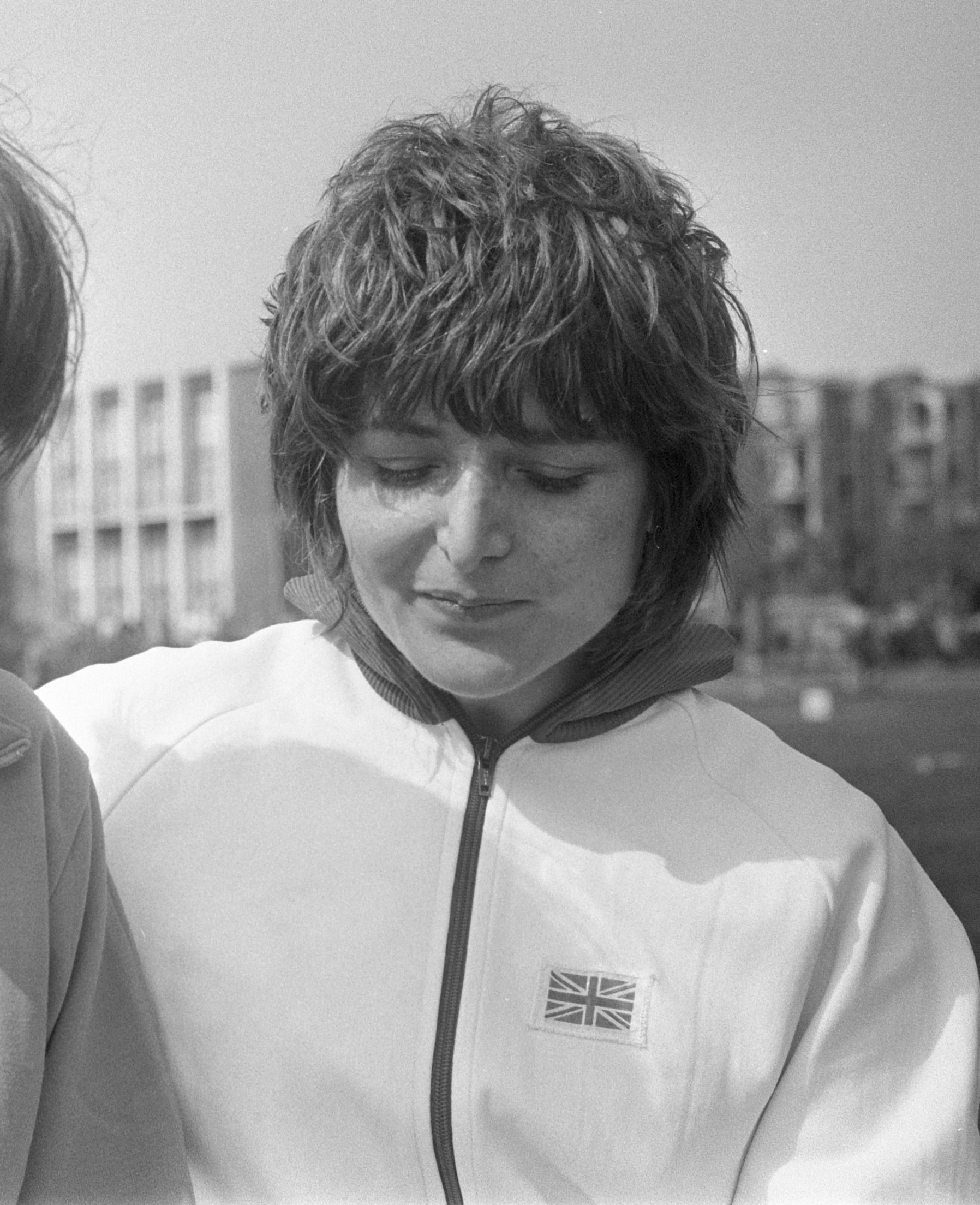
- Carey in 1970

Personal information
- Born: 12 August 1946 (age 79) Coventry, Warwickshire, England
- Height: 165 cm (5 ft 5 in)
- Weight: 54 kg (119 lb)
- Spouse: Peter Carey (m. 1968)

Sport
- Sport: Athletics
- Event(s): 800 m, 1500 m
- Club: Coventry Godiva Harriers

Achievements and titles
- Personal best(s): 800 m – 2:02.9 (1971); 1500 m – 4:04.81 (1972)

Sheila Janet Carey MBE, (née Taylor; born 12 August 1946) is a British retired middle-distance runner who represented the United Kingdom at the 1968 and 1972 Summer Olympics. In 1968, she placed fourth in the 800 metres, while in 1972, she finishing fifth in the 1500 metres, setting a new British record. She represented England at the Commonwealth Games in 1970 and 1974. She was also part of the British 4×800 metres relay team that twice broke the world record in 1970.

== Biography ==
At the 1968 Olympics in Mexico City, Carey (competing under her maiden name of Taylor) placed fourth in the 800 metres. Taylor married Peter Carey in Coventry during late 1968 and competed under her married name thereafter.

In June 1970, in Edinburgh, the UK 4 × 800 m relay quartet of Rosemary Stirling, Carey, Pat Lowe and Lillian Board, broke the world record with 8:27.0. Carey became the British 800 metres champion after winning the British WAAA Championships title at the 1970 WAAA Championships.

Then in September 1970 at the Crystal Palace, London, the quartet of Stirling, Georgena Craig, Lowe and Carey, improved the record to 8:25.0. In between these performances, Carey competed at the Commonwealth Games in July, held in Edinburgh. She finished eighth in the 800 m final, after a fall.

Carey competed at the 1972 Olympics in Munich, where she came in fifth in the 1500 m, setting a new British record at 4:04.8. This time remained Carey's best and as of 2013, ranked 19th on the UK all-time list. The race was won by Lyudmila Bragina and saw more than five runners beating the pre-Games world record.

Carey continued to represent the UK at international level through 1973 and 1974. She ran her lifetime best for the mile, with 4:37.16 at the Crystal Palace in September 1973, where she finished second behind Joan Allison. She made her final appearance at the 1974 Commonwealth Games in Christchurch, New Zealand. There she was eliminated in her heat of the 800 m in 2:09.16.

After retiring from international athletics Carey later went on to teach in the United Kingdom, working for many years at Exhall Grange School, a school for children with sight loss and other disabilities, near Coventry in 1987. She has been part-time at the school since 2006. Carey runs the U2 Track and Field Club and organises competitions for the sports charity British Blind Sport. In 2012, she carried the Olympic torch through Warwick as part of the relay ahead of the London Olympic Games. Her school also did a mini version of the Olympic Games.

She was appointed Member of the Order of the British Empire (MBE) in the 2013 New Year Honours for services to disability athletics.
