= Euan Robertson =

New Zealand runner (1948–1995)

Euan Robinson
Personal information
- Born: Euan James Robinson; 14 June 1948 Lower Hutt, New Zealand
- Died: 11 December 1995 (aged 47) Bethells Beach, New Zealand

Sport
- Country: New Zealand
- Sport: Athletics
- Events: 3000 m SC; 5000 m; 10,000 m

Achievements and titles
- National finals: 3000 m steeplechase champion (1976, 1978, 1980); 10,000 champion (1979)
Medal record
Representing New Zealand
Men's cross country
World championships
Bronze medal – third place	1973 Waregem	Team

Euan James Robertson (14 June 1948 – 11 December 1995) was a New Zealand distance runner in the 1970s, one of the great periods of New Zealand distance running.

== Early life ==
He was born in Lower Hutt near Wellington and educated at Scots College and Massey University, where he gained a degree in agricultural soil science. He was a soil conservator for the Ministry of Works from 1973, then moving to Cambridge and Auckland and gaining an MBA degree.

== Running career ==
At the 1974 Commonwealth Games he was fifth in the 3000m steeplechase.

He was accepted by the selectors for the 1976 Summer Olympics on his fourth attempt, after running in Stockholm and achieving a New Zealand record time. He finished sixth in the 3000m steeplechase at Montreal; reducing the New Zealand record from his 8 minutes 22.8 seconds at Stockholm to 8 minutes 21.08 seconds.

Euan spent a number of years in Dunedin where he ran for the Mornington Harrier Club.

At the 1978 Commonwealth Games he was fourth in the 3000m steeplechase.

He ran in the 3000m steeplechase, and cross-country; and later won New Zealand senior titles in the 5000m, 10,000m, 3000m steeplechase and cross-country.

He represented New Zealand at the World Cross Country Championships on a number of occasions. His finest hour came in 1975 in Morocco where he finished 5th – one place behind John Walker.

== Death ==
In December 1995, Euan was running with a group of young athletes on the sand dunes at Bethells Beach near Auckland when he collapsed and died of a heart attack, aged 47.
