= Maureen de St. Croix =

Personal information
- Born: May 25, 1953 (age 73) Surrey, British Columbia, Canada

Sport
- Sport: Track and field
Medal record
Representing Canada
Commonwealth Games
Bronze medal – third place	1974 Christchurch	4x400m relay

Maureen de St. Croix (née Crowley; born May 25, 1953) is a Canadian middle- and long-distance runner and former sprinter.

At the 1974 British Commonwealth Games she won bronze in the 4 × 400 metres relay and placed sixth in the 800 metres.

She was three times on the Canadian team at the World Cross Country Championships, scoring 43rd 1977 in Düsseldorf, 66th 1979 in Limerick and 108th 1986 in Colombier. Also in 1986, she was the first winner of the Ottawa Race Weekend 10K.

She has continued to run into Masters age groups, in 2003 setting the Masters world record in the 1500 meters at 4:40.92. Her record has since been beaten several times.

She is now a founder and is the head coach of Ocean Athletics, a track club in South Surrey, British Columbia.
