= Mustafa Musa =

Ugandan long-distance runner

Personal information
- Nationality: Ugandan
- Born: 25 July 1947 (age 78)

Sport
- Sport: Long-distance running
- Event: Marathon

Mustafa Musa (born 25 July 1947) is a Ugandan long-distance runner. He competed in the marathon at the 1968 Summer Olympics. He was the first long-distance runner to compete for Uganda at the Olympics.
