= Paul Mose =

Kenyan long-distance runner

Personal information
- Nationality: Kenyan
- Born: 15 May 1949 (age 77) Kisii, Kenya

Sport
- Sport: Long-distance running
- Event: Marathon

Paul Mose (born 15 May 1949) is a Kenyan long-distance runner. He competed in the marathon at the 1968 Summer Olympics.

Personal Bests: 5000 – 13:23.2 (1972); 10000 – 28:09.8 (1976); Mar – 2-14:15s (1968).
