= Jack Foster (athlete) =

New Zealand long-distance runner

Personal information
- Born: 23 May 1932 Liverpool, England
- Died: 5 June 2004 (aged 72) Rotorua, New Zealand
Medal record
Men's athletics
Representing New Zealand
Commonwealth Games
Silver medal – second place	1974 Christchurch	Marathon

John Charles Foster (23 May 1932 – 5 June 2004) was a long-distance runner born in Liverpool, England. At first a cyclist, who didn't start running until he was 32, he represented New Zealand in the men's marathon at two Summer Olympics at Munich, West Germany (1972) and Montreal, Canada (1976). He made the team for the 1975 International Cross Country Championships, where his country took the title. A resident of Rotorua, he won the silver medal in the marathon at the 1974 Commonwealth Games in Christchurch with a master's world record time of 2:11:18.6 at the age of 41. Two years earlier, he had set a world record for 20 miles at 1:39:14.

Foster is featured in the New Zealand short film "On the Run" about Arthur Lydiard influenced athletes. In the final scene, Foster shows the highlight of his training is a 3,000 foot run down a 45 degree scree hill.

He was killed while riding his bicycle in Rotorua.

== Achievements ==
Year	Competition	Venue	Position	Event	Notes
Representing New Zealand
1970	Commonwealth Games	Edinburgh, Scotland	4th	Marathon	2:14:44
1970	Fukuoka Marathon	Fukuoka, Japan	4th	Marathon	2:12:17.8
1971	Fukuoka Marathon	Fukuoka, Japan	3rd	Marathon	2:13:42.4
1972	Olympic Games	Munich, Germany	8th	Marathon	2:16:56
1973	Kyoto Marathon	Kyoto, Japan	1st	Marathon	2:14:53.4
1974	Commonwealth Games	Christchurch, New Zealand	2nd	Marathon	2:11:18.6 PR
1975	Honolulu Marathon	Honolulu, Hawaii	1st	Marathon	2:17:24
1976	Auckland Marathon	Auckland, New Zealand	1st	Marathon	2:16:27
1976	Olympic Games	Montréal, Canada	17th	Marathon	2:17:53
1978	New York City Marathon	New York City, United States	6th	Marathon	2:17:28

== Personal bests ==
Distance	Time	Place	Date
25000 m	1:16:29 NR	Hamilton	1971
30000 m	1:32:19 NR	Hamilton	1971
Marathon	2:11.18.6	Christchurch	1974

Awards
Preceded by Rod Dixon	Lonsdale Cup of the New Zealand Olympic Committee; 1973	Succeeded by Dick Tayler
