= Sue Golder =

New Zealand racing cyclist

Sue Golder née Haden
Personal information
- Nationality: New Zealander
- Born: 29 April 1946 (age 80) Hastings, Hawke's Bay, New Zealand
- Height: 175 cm (5 ft 9 in)
- Weight: 67 kg (148 lb)

Sport
- Sport: Athletics
- Event: middle-distance
- Club: Auckland
Medal record
Women's Athletics
Representing New Zealand
Women's athletics
British Commonwealth Games
Silver medal – second place	1974 Christchurch	800 metres
Women's track cycling
Commonwealth Games
Bronze medal – third place	1990 Auckland	Sprint

Susan Gay Golder (née Haden, born 29 April 1946) is a New Zealand former athlete and track cyclist who competed at the 1972 Summer Olympics.

== Biography ==
At the 1972 Olympics Games in Munich, she represented New Zealand in athletics, finishing 4th in her heat of the 800 metres.

Haden finished second behind Mary Tracey in the 800 metres event at the British 1973 WAAA Championships.

At the 1974 British Commonwealth Games, she won the silver medal in the women's 800 metres. As a track cyclist, Golder won the bronze medal in the women's sprint at the 1990 Commonwealth Games.
