= Charlene Rendina =

Australian athlete

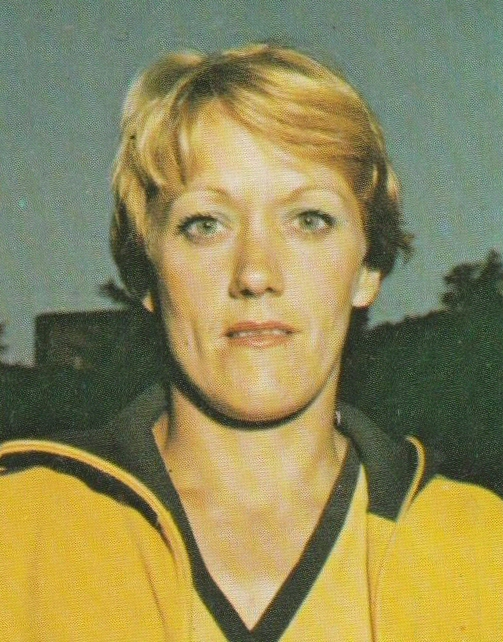
- Rendina in 1976

Personal information
- Born: 18 December 1947 (age 78)
Medal record
Women's athletics
Representing Australia
Commonwealth Games
Gold medal – first place	1974 Christchurch	800 m
Silver medal – second place	1974 Christchurch	4 x 400 m relay
Bronze medal – third place	1974 Christchurch	400 m

Charlene Rendina (née Neighbor; born 18 December 1947) is a retired Australian athlete who specialised in sprint and middle distance events.

Her personal best time of 1:59.0 (hand timed) in the 800 metres, set in 1976, remained the Australian record for 43 years until Catriona Bisset broke it in July 2019.

== Competitive results ==
In Rendina's first Olympic competition in Munich, 1972, she set an Olympic record (51.90 seconds in her heat) on her way to the 400 metres final, where she eventually finished in sixth place in 51.99 seconds. She was also in the final of the 4 × 400 m relay where she ran a 50.7 leg for the Australian team that came in 6th in 3:28.84.

At the 1974 Commonwealth Games, she moved up to the 800 metres distance and took gold.

At the 1976 Olympics, Redina was eliminated after finishing 5th in the 800m semi-final in 2:00.29. She was part of the Australian 4 × 400 m relay team that finished 4th in 3:25.56 – her leg being timed at 51.6 seconds.

In her career, Rendina won five national championship titles at 800m and two at 400m.

== See also ==
- Australian athletics champions (Women)
