= Sabina Chebichi =

Kenyan middle-distance runner

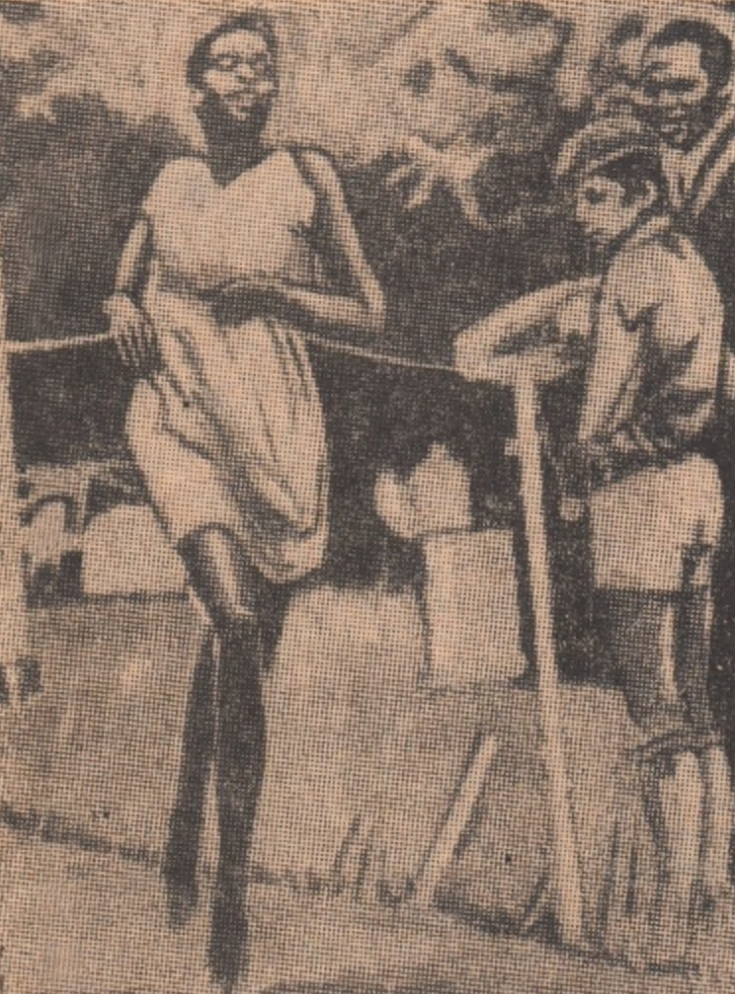
- Sabina Chebichi

Personal information
- Nationality: Kenyan
- Born: Sabina Chebichi; 13 June 1959 (age 67) Tumchoi, Kipsaos, Elgeyo Marakwet County, Kenya

Sport
- Country: Kenya
- Sport: Athletics
- Event: Middle distance

Achievements and titles
- Olympic finals: 1976 Summer Olympics (Country withdrew)
- Highest world ranking: Bronze (Commonwealth Games 1974)

Sabina Chebichi is a former Kenyan middle-distance runner popularly known as ‘petticoat princess’

== Background ==
Sabina Chebichi was born in 1959 in Elgeyo Marakwet County, northwest of Nairobi, Kenya. She attended Kipsaos Primary School for her early education.

== Career ==
Chebichi started running in 1972, her first race was at Kechiko which she won. When news about a schoolgirl competing without any kit broke out in the media, Feisal Sherman who was Secretary of Kenya's Amateur Athletic Association (now Athletics Kenya) sent her running kit and proper shoes. At 14 years of age, Chebichi became the first Kenyan female athlete to win a medal at the Commonwealth Games in 1974, she won bronze in the 800m Women's race at 2:02.61 mins, she went on to compete in the 4 × 400 m Relay and 1500m race.

Year	Competition	Venue	Position	Event	Notes
Representing Kenya
1974	Commonwealth Games	Christchurch, New Zealand	3rd (bronze)	800 m	2:02.61
1974	Commonwealth Games	Christchurch, New Zealand	8th	4 × 400 m	3:51.9
1974	Commonwealth Games	Christchurch, New Zealand	5th	1500 m	4:25.8

Sabina Chebichi was named to compete at the 1976 Summer Olympics which were held in Montreal Canada from July 17 to August 1 before her country Kenya boycotted the games along with other African countries. Her career was halted by pregnancy.

== See also ==
- List of Commonwealth Games medallists in athletics (women)
