= Penny Hunt =

New Zealand sprinter (born 1948)

Personal information
- Born: Penelope Christine Haworth; 18 January 1948 (age 78) Timaru, New Zealand

Sport
- Country: New Zealand
- Sport: Sprinting
- Event: 400 metres

Penelope Christine Hunt (née Haworth; born 18 January 1948) is a New Zealand sprinter. She competed in the women's 400 metres at the 1972 Summer Olympics.

She represented New Zealand in the Edinburgh Commonwealth Games in 1970, and New Zealand Games 1974. And Commonwealth Games, Edmonton, Canada. She made the finals in the 4x400, and 400. And 4x100.

Penny won 3 New Zealand 100 titles. Also 6 200 titles, as well as 5 400 national titles.

Penny went on to become a teacher and author.
