= Dick Tayler =

New Zealand long-distance runner

Dick Tayler MNZM
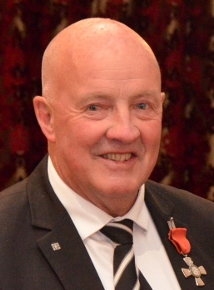
- Tayler in 2014

Personal information
- Born: Richard John Tayler; 12 August 1948 (age 77) Timaru, New Zealand

Sport
- Country: New Zealand
- Sport: Athletics

Achievements and titles
- National finals: 1500 m champion (1970); 10,000 m champion (1974); Cross country champion (1973); 15 km road champion (1971)
Medal record
Men's athletics
Representing New Zealand
Commonwealth Games
Gold medal – first place	1974 Christchurch	10,000 m

Richard John Tayler MNZM (born 12 August 1948) is a former New Zealand runner who mostly competed in distances from 1500 m to 10,000 m.

Tayler was born in Timaru, and attended Timaru Boys' High School, the same school as Jack Lovelock. He is best known for winning the 10,000 metres at the 1974 Commonwealth Games in Christchurch, New Zealand, in a time of 27:46.4, breaking the New Zealand record.

Tayler competed at the 1970 and 1974 Commonwealth Games, as well as the 1972 Summer Olympics.

He finished 12th at the 1st IAAF World Cross Country Championships in Waregem, Belgium, 1973.

Arthritis cut short Tayler's running career.

In the 2014 New Year Honours, Tayler was appointed a Member of the New Zealand Order of Merit for services to athletics.

Awards
Preceded by Jack Foster	Lonsdale Cup of the New Zealand Olympic Committee; 1974	Succeeded by John Walker
