= Swimming at the 1974 British Commonwealth Games =

- Venue: QEII Leisure Centre, Queen Elizabeth II Park
- Location: Christchurch, New Zealand
- Dates: 24 January to 2 February 1974

Swimming at the 1974 British Commonwealth Games was the tenth appearance of Swimming at the Commonwealth Games. There were 29 swimming events and they took place from 24 January to 2 February 1974.

The events were held at the QEII Leisure Centre in Queen Elizabeth II Park and was specifically constructed for the Games. The centre was attached to the east stand of the main Commonwealth Games stadium used for the opening ceremony and athletics.

Australia topped the medal table with 12 gold medals.

== Medal table ==
* Host nation (New Zealand)

Medals won by nation with totals, ranked by number of golds—sortable
Rank	Nation	Gold	Silver	Bronze	Total
1	Australia	12	11	10	33
2	Canada	9	11	7	27
3	England	3	4	6	13
4	Scotland	2	2	2	6
5	New Zealand*	2	1	4	7
6	Wales	1	0	0	1
7	Isle of Man	0	0	0	0
Totals (7 entries)		29	29	29	87

== Medallists ==
Men

Event	Gold	Silver	Bronze
100 m freestyle	(Australia) Michael Wenden	(Canada) Bruce Robertson	(Canada) Brian Phillips
200 m freestyle	(Australia) Steve Badger	(Canada) Bruce Robertson	(Australia) Michael Wenden
400 m freestyle	(Australia) John Kulasalu	(Australia) Brad Cooper	(Australia) Steve Badger
1500 m freestyle	(Australia) Steve Holland	(New Zealand) Mark Treffers	(Australia) Steve Badger
100 m backstroke	(Australia) Mark Tonelli	(Canada) Steve Pickell	(Australia) Brad Cooper
200 m backstroke	(Australia) Brad Cooper	(Australia) Mark Tonelli	(Australia) Robert Williams
100 m breaststroke	(England) David Leigh	(Scotland) David Wilkie	(England) Paul Naisby
200 m breaststroke	(Scotland) David Wilkie	(England) David Leigh	(England) Paul Naisby
100 m butterfly	(Australia) Neil Rogers	(Canada) Byron MacDonald	(Canada) Bruce Robertson
200 m butterfly	(England) Brian Brinkley	(Australia) Ross Seymour	(New Zealand) John Coutts
200 m individual medley	(Scotland) David Wilkie	(England) Brian Brinkley	(Canada) Gary MacDonald
400 m individual medley	(New Zealand) Mark Treffers	(England) Brian Brinkley	(England) Raymond Terrell
4×100 m freestyle relay	(Canada); Brian Phillips; Bruce Robertson; Gary MacDonald; Ian MacKenzie	(Australia); Michael Wenden; Neil Rogers; Peter Coughlan; Ross Patterson	(England); Brian Brinkley; Colin Cunningham; Keith Walton; Raymond Terrell
4×200 m freestyle relay	(Australia); John Kulasalu; Michael Wenden; Robert Nay; Steve Badger	(England); Brian Brinkley; Colin Cunningham; Neil Dexter; Raymond Terrell	(Canada); Bruce Robertson; Gary MacDonald; Ian MacKenzie; Jim Fowlie
4×100 m medley relay	(Canada); Brian Phillips; Bruce Robertson; Steve Pickell; William Mahony	(Australia); Mark Tonelli; Michael Wenden; Neil Rogers; Nigel Cluer	(England); Brian Brinkley; Colin Cunningham; David Leigh; Stephen Nash

Women

Event	Gold	Silver	Bronze
100 m freestyle	(Australia) Sonya Gray	(Canada) Gail Amundrud	(Canada) Judy Wright
200 m freestyle	(Australia) Sonya Gray	(Australia) Jenny Turrall	(Canada) Gail Amundrud
400 m freestyle	(Australia) Jenny Turrall	(Canada) Wendy Quirk	(New Zealand) Jaynie Parkhouse
800 m freestyle	(New Zealand) Jaynie Parkhouse	(Australia) Jenny Turrall	(Australia) Rosemary Milgate
100 m backstroke	(Canada) Wendy Cook	(Canada) Donna-Marie Gurr	(Australia) Linda Young
200 m backstroke	(Canada) Wendy Cook	(Australia) Sandra Yost	(Canada) Donna-Marie Gurr
100 m breaststroke	(England) Christine Gaskell	(Canada) Marian Stuart	(Scotland) Sandra Dickie
200 m breaststroke	(Wales) Pat Beavan	(Australia) Beverley Whitfield	(Australia) Allison Smith
100 m butterfly	(Canada) Patti Stenhouse	(Scotland) Kim Wickham	(Australia) Sandra Yost
200 m butterfly	(Australia) Sandra Yost	(Canada) Patti Stenhouse	(Australia) Gail Neall
200 m individual medley	(Canada) Leslie Cliff	(Canada) Becky Smith	(New Zealand) Susan Hunter
400 m individual medley	(Canada) Leslie Cliff	(Canada) Becky Smith	(New Zealand) Susan Hunter
4 × 100 m freestyle relay	(Canada); Anne Jardin; Becky Smith; Gail Amundrud; Judy Wright	(Australia); Debra Cain; Jennifer Turrall; Sonya Gray; Suzy Anderson	(England); Alyson Jones; Avis Willington; Lesley Allardice; Susan Edmondson
4 × 100 m medley relay	(Canada); Gail Amundrud; Marian Stuart; Patti Stenhouse; Wendy Cook	(Australia); Beverley Whitfield; Debra Cain; Linda Young; Sonya Gray	(Scotland); Gillian Fordyce; Kim Wickham; Morag McGlashan; Sandra Dickie

== Finals (men) ==
=== 100m freestyle ===
Pos	Athlete	Time
1	(Australia) Michael Wenden	52.73
2	(Canada) Bruce Robertson	53.78
3	(Canada) Brian Phillips	54.11
4	(Australia) Neil Rogers	54.31
5	(England) Colin Cunningham	54.54
6	(Australia) Ross Donald Patterson	54.58
7	(Northern Ireland) Andrew Hunter	54.91
8	(England) Keith Walton	55.26

=== 200m freestyle ===
Pos	Athlete	Time
1	(Australia) Steve Badger	1:56.72
2	(Canada) Bruce Robertson	1:57.21
3	(Australia) Michael Wenden	1:57.83
4	(Australia) Robert Nay	1:57.84
5	(Canada) Ian MacKenzie	1:57.96
6	(New Zealand) Brett Naylor	1:59.35
7	(Scotland) Gordon Downie	1:59.39
8	(Scotland) Wilson Mills	1:59.53

=== 400m freestyle ===
Pos	Athlete	Time
1	(Australia) John Kulasalu	4:01.44
2	(Australia) Brad Cooper	4:02.12
3	(Australia) Steve Badger	4:04.07
4	(New Zealand) Mark Treffers	4:05.80
5	(New Zealand) Brett Naylor	4:10.88
6	(Scotland) Alan McClatchey	4:12.32
7	(Canada) Jim Fowlie	4:13.38
8	(England) Neil Dexter	4:13.72

=== 1500m freestyle ===
Pos	Athlete	Time
1	(Australia) Steve Holland	15:34.73
2	(New Zealand) Mark Treffers	15:59.82
3	(Australia) Steve Badger	16:22.23
4	(Scotland) James Carter	16:34.70
5	(Scotland) Alan McClatchey	16:48.71
6	(Canada) Jim Fowlie	16:53.43
7	(Canada) Bruce Rogers	17:02.51
8	(Australia) Brad Cooper	17:03.20

=== 100m backstroke ===
Pos	Athlete	Time
1	(Australia) Mark Tonelli	59.65
2	(Canada) Steve Pickell	59.88
3	(Australia) Brad Cooper	60.17
4	(Canada) Ian MacKenzie	60.32
5	(England) Colin Cunningham	60.98
6	(Australia) Robert Williams	61.93
7	(Scotland) Ian Hughes	62.71
8	(Northern Ireland) Robbie Howard	62.77

=== 200m backstroke ===
Pos	Athlete	Time
1	(Australia) Brad Cooper	2:06.31
2	(Australia) Mark Tonelli	2:09.47
3	(Australia) Robert Williams	2:09.83
4	(England) Colin Cunningham	2:11.20
5	(Canada) Ian MacKenzie	2:13.16
6	(Canada) Steve Hardy	2:12.06
7	(Canada) Paul Hughes	2:12.36
8	(Scotland) Ian Hughes	2:12.66

=== 100m breaststroke ===
Pos	Athlete	Time
1	(England) David Leigh	1:06.52
2	(Scotland) David Wilkie	1:07.37
3	(England) Paul Naisby	1:08.52
4	(Canada) Peter Hrdlitschka	1:09.92
5	(Australia) Nigel Cluer	1:10.07
6	(Scotland) Alan Thompson	1:10.69
7	(Australia) Gregory Bush	1:11.91
8	(Australia) Michael Creswick	1:15.43

=== 200m breaststroke ===
Pos	Athlete	Time
1	(Scotland) David Wilkie	2:24.42
2	(England) David Leigh	2:24.75
3	(England) Paul Naisby	2:27.36
4	(Canada) Bill Mahony	2:27.62
5	(Australia) Gregory Bush	2:30.13
6	(Australia) Nigel Cluer	2:30.56
7	(Canada) Peter Hrdlitschka	2:32.92
8	(Australia) Michael Creswick	2:37.31

=== 100m butterfly ===
Pos	Athlete	Time
1	(Australia) Neil Rogers	56.58
2	(Canada) Byron Macdonald	56.83
3	(Canada) Bruce Robertson	56.84
4	(Australia) Kenneth Ross Seymour	57.43
5	(Canada) Brian Phillips	57.99
6	(England) Colin Cunningham	59.16
7	(England) Stephen Nash	59.45
8	(England) Martin Edwards	59.60

=== 200m butterfly ===
Pos	Athlete	Time
1	(England) Brian Brinkley	2:04.51
2	(Australia) Kenneth Ross Seymour	2:06.64
3	(New Zealand) John Coutts	2:07.03
4	(Canada) Lorne Kemmet	2:08.20
5	(Australia) Peter Smith	2:08.94
6	(Scotland) Alan McClatchey	2:09.44
7	(England) Stephen Nash	2:09.51
8	(Canada) Byron Macdonald	2:11.52

=== 200m medley ===
Pos	Athlete	Time
1	(Scotland) David Wilkie	2:10.11
2	(England) Brian Brinkley	2:12.73
3	(Canada) Gary MacDonald	2:12.98
4	(England) Raymond Terrell	2:13.69
5	(Australia) Nigel Cluer	2:15.00
6	(Wales) Rowland Jones	2:17.83
7	(Canada) Peter Hrdlitschka	2:17.84
8	(Scotland) James Carter	2:18.74

=== 400m medley ===
Pos	Athlete	Time
1	(New Zealand) Mark Treffers	4:35.90
2	(England) Brian Brinkley	4:41.29
3	(England) Raymond Terrell	4:42.94
4	(Canada) Jim Fowlie	4:44.57
5	(Scotland) James Carter	4:44.83
6	(Canada) Paul Hughes	4:48.21
7	(Canada) Gary MacDonald	4:49.49
8	(Australia) Robert Williams	4:54.34

=== 4 x 100m freestyle relay ===
Pos	Athlete	Time
1	(Canada) Phillips, Robertson, MacDonald, MacKenzie	3:33.79
2	(Australia) Wenden, Rogers, Coughlan, Patterson	3:34.26
3	(England) Brinkley, Cunningham, Walton, Terrell	3:38.22
4	(Scotland) McClatchey, Wilkie, Downie, Mills	3:42.91
5	(New Zealand) Fogel, Naylor, Coutts, Johnston	3:45.76
6	(Wales) Lewis, Moran, Jones, Maher	3:47.43

=== 4 x 200 freestyle relay ===
Pos	Athlete	Time
1	(Australia) Kulasalu, Wenden, Nay, Badger	7:50.13
2	(England) Brinkley, Cunningham, Dexter, Terrell	7:52.90
3	(Canada) Robertson, MacDonald, MacKenzie, Fowlie	7:53.38
4	(Scotland) McClatchey, Downie, Carter, Mills	7:57.85
5	(New Zealand) Naylor, Coutts, Treffers, Johnston	8:01.03
6	(Wales) Lewis, Moran, Jones, Maher	8:31.53

=== 4 x 100 medley relay ===
Pos	Athlete	Time
1	(Canada) Phillips, Robertson, Pickell, Mahony	
2	(Australia) Tonelli, Wenden, Rogers, Cluer	3:55.76
3	(England) Brinkley, Cunningham, Leigh, Nash	4:00.48
4	(Scotland) Hughes, Wilkie, McClatchey, Downie	4:02.37
5	(Wales) Lewis, Culverwell, Maher, Davies	4:13.98
6	(New Zealand) Lewis, Naylor, Toomey, Thorogood	4:14.08
7	(Northern Ireland) Howard, Hunter, Corry, McGrory	4:22.72

== Finals (women) ==
=== 100m freestyle ===
Pos	Athlete	Time
1	(Australia) Sonya Gray	59.13
2	(Canada) Gail Amundrud	59.36
3	(Canada) Judy Wright	59.46
4	(Canada) Anne Jardin	59.85
5	(New Zealand) Jaynie Parkhouse	60.96
6	(Australia) Suzy Anderson	61.24
7	(Scotland) Morag McGlashan	61.25
8	(Scotland) Jackie Simpson	62.04

=== 200m freestyle ===
Pos	Athlete	Time
1	(Australia) Sonya Gray	2:04.27
2	(Australia) Jenny Turrall	2:06.90
3	(Canada) Gail Amundrud	2:07.03
4	(Canada) Wendy Quirk	2:07.06
5	(New Zealand) Jaynie Parkhouse	2:08.80
6	(Canada) Brenda Holmes	2:08.87
7	(Australia) Virginia Rickard	2:09.01
8	(Scotland) Diane Walker	2:10.02

=== 400m freestyle ===
Pos	Athlete	Time
1	(Australia) Jenny Turrall	4:22.09
2	(Canada) Wendy Quirk	4:22.96
3	(New Zealand) Jaynie Parkhouse	4:23.09
4	(Australia) Sally Lockyer	4:24.57
5	(Australia) Narelle Moras	4:25.21
6	(Scotland) Diane Walker	4:33.01
7	(Canada) Anne Jardin	4:34.53
8	(Scotland) Debbie Simpson	4:39.39

=== 800m freestyle ===
Pos	Athlete	Time
1	(New Zealand) Jaynie Parkhouse	8:58.49
2	(Australia) Jenny Turrall	8:58.53
3	(Australia) Rosemary Milgate	8:58.59
4	(Australia) Sally Lockyer	8:59.20
5	(Canada) Wendy Quirk	9:05.29
6	(New Zealand) Allison Calder	9:19.19
7	(Canada) Brenda Holmes	9:22.03
8	(Scotland) Debbie Simpson	9:22.22

=== 100m backstroke ===
Pos	Athlete	Time
1	(Canada) Wendy Cook	1:06.37
2	(Canada) Donna-Marie Gurr	1:06.55
3	(Australia) Linda Young	1:07.52
4	(Australia) Sue Lewis	1:07.56
5	(Australia) Debra Cain	1:07.69
6	(Canada) Becky Smith	1:08.03
7	(New Zealand) Susan Hunter	1:09.06
8	(Scotland) Gillian Fordyce	1:09.18

=== 200m backstroke ===
Pos	Athlete	Time
1	(Canada) Wendy Cook	2:20.37
2	(Australia) Sandra Yost	2:22.07
3	(Canada) Donna-Marie Gurr	2:23.74
4	(Australia) Sue Lewis	2:23.85
5	(Australia) Linda Young	2:25.73
6	(New Zealand) Susan Hunter	2:26.27
7	(New Zealand) Monique Rodahl	2:27.67
8	(Scotland) Gillian Fordyce	2:28.37

=== 100m breaststroke ===
Pos	Athlete	Time
1	(England) Christine Gaskell	1:16.42
2	(Canada) Marian Stuart	1:16.61
3	(Scotland) Sandra Dickie	1:17.17
4	(Wales) Pat Beavan	1:17.49
5	(England) Christine Jarvis	1:17.59
6	(New Zealand) Jane Lowe	1:17.72
7	(Australia) Beverley Whitfield	1:17.75
8	(Australia) Allison Smith	1:17.85

=== 200m breaststroke ===
Pos	Athlete	Time
1	(Wales) Pat Beavan	2:43.11
2	(Australia) Beverley Whitfield	2:43.58
3	(Australia) Allison Smith	2:45.08
4	(New Zealand) Jane Lowe	2:45.10
5	(England) Christine Gaskell	2:45.12
6	(Canada) Marian Stuart	2:46.96
7	(Scotland) Sandra Dickie	2:51.64
8	(England) Caroline Tamlyn	2:51.89

=== 100m butterfly ===
Pos	Athlete	Time
1	(Canada) Patti Stenhouse	1:05.38
2	(Scotland) Kim Wickham	1:05.96
3	(Australia) Sandra Yost	1:06.04
4	(Australia) Debra Cain	1:06.07
5	(Canada) Wendy Quirk	1:06.52
6	(Canada) Leslie Cliff	1:07.15
7	(Australia) Vicki Jaensch	1:07.72
8	(England) Joanne Atkinson	1:08.86

=== 200m butterfly ===
Pos	Athlete	Time
1	(Australia) Sandra Yost	2:20.57
2	(Canada) Patti Stenhouse	2:20.66
3	(Australia) Gail Neall	2:21.66
4	(Canada) Leslie Cliff	2:22.10
5	(Canada) France Latendresse	2:24.32
6	(Australia) Vicki Jaensch	2:24.81
7	(England) Jean Jeavons	2:26.48
8	(New Zealand) Debbie Ledgerwood	2:28.40

=== 200m medley ===
Pos	Athlete	Time
1	(Canada) Leslie Cliff	2:24.13
2	(Canada) Becky Smith	2:25.17
3	(New Zealand) Susan Hunter	2:26.18
4	(Canada) Wendy Cook	2:27.49
5	(Australia) Debra Cain	2:27.97
6	(England) Susan Richardson	2:28.67
7	(Australia) Sally Lockyer	2:28.86
8	(Scotland) Diane Walker	2:29.62

=== 400m medley ===
Pos	Athlete	Time
1	(Canada) Leslie Cliff	5:01.35
2	(Canada) Becky Smith	5:03.68
3	(New Zealand) Susan Hunter	5:07.20
4	(Australia) Sally Lockyer	5:07.93
5	(England) Susan Richardson	5:08.74
6	(Scotland) Diane Walker	5:11.82
7	(Canada) Brenda Holmes	5:11.86
8	(Australia) Gail Neall	5:13.20

=== 4 x 100 freestyle relay ===
Pos	Athlete	Time
1	(Canada) Jardin, Smith, Amundrud, Wright	3:57.14
2	(Australia) Cain, Turrall, Gray, Anderson	4:02.37
3	(England) Jones, Willington, Allardice, Edmondson	4:05.59
4	(Scotland) D Simpson, Walker, J Simpson, McGlashan	4:06.53
5	(New Zealand) Calder, Parkhouse, Hunter, Kennedy	4:06.94
6	(Wales) Adams, Parry, Walker, Hurn	4:26.32
7	(Fiji) J Perrott, Murphy, Probert, R Perrott	4:35.41

=== 4 x 100 medley relay ===
Pos	Athlete	Time
1	(Canada) Amundrud, Stuart, Stenhouse, Cook	4:24.77
2	(Australia) Whitfield, Cain, Young, Gray	4:30.55
3	(Scotland) Fordyce, Wickham, McGlashan, Dickie	4:31.68
4	(England) Jones, Gaskell, Atkinson, Kelly	4:33.61
5	(New Zealand) Ledgerwood, Lowe, Parkhouse, Rodahl	4:41.54
6	(Wales) Adams, Walker, Beaven, Hurn	4:41.94
7	(Fiji) J Perrott, Murphy, Probert, R Perrott	5:11.90

== See also ==
- Diving at the 1974 British Commonwealth Games
