= List of Commonwealth Games medallists in swimming (women) =

This is a list of women's Commonwealth Games medallists in swimming from 1930 to 2022.

== Current program ==
=== 50 metre freestyle ===
Games	Gold	Silver	Bronze
1990 Auckland	Lisa Curry-Kenny; Australia	Karen van Wirdum; Australia	Andrea Nugent; Canada
1994 Victoria	Karen van Wirdum; Australia	Andrea Nugent; Canada	Shannon Shakespeare; Canada
1998 Kuala Lumpur	Sue Rolph; England	Alison Sheppard; Scotland	Toni Jeffs; New Zealand
2002 Manchester	Alison Sheppard; Scotland	Jodie Henry; Australia	Toni Jeffs; New Zealand
2006 Melbourne	Libby Lenton; Australia	Jodie Henry; Australia	Alice Mills; Australia
2010 Delhi	Yolane Kukla; Australia	Fran Halsall; England	Hayley Palmer; New Zealand
2014 Glasgow	Fran Halsall; England	Cate Campbell; Australia	Bronte Campbell; Australia
2018 Gold Coast	Cate Campbell; Australia	Bronte Campbell; Australia	none awarded
2018 Gold Coast	Cate Campbell; Australia	Taylor Ruck; Canada	none awarded
2022 Birmingham	Emma McKeon; Australia	Meg Harris; Australia	Shayna Jack; Australia
2026 Glasgow	Meg Harris; Australia	Alex Perkins; Australia	Shayna Jack; Australia
2026 Glasgow	Meg Harris; Australia	Alex Perkins; Australia	Shayna Jack; Australia

=== 100 metre freestyle ===
Games	Gold	Silver	Bronze
1970 Edinburgh	Angela Coughlan; Canada	Lynne Watson; Australia	Jenny Watts; Australia
1974 Christchurch	Sonya Gray; Australia	Gail Amundrud; Canada	Judy Wright; Canada
1978 Edmonton	Carol Klimpel; Canada	Rosemary Brown; Australia	Wendy Quirk; Canada
1982 Brisbane	June Croft; England	Angela Russell; Australia	Lisa Curry; Australia
1986 Edinburgh	Jane Kerr; Canada	Angela Harris; Australia	Nicola Fibbens; England
1990 Auckland	Karen van Wirdum; Australia	Lisa Curry-Kenny; Australia	Patricia Noall; Canada
1994 Victoria	Karen Pickering; England	Karen van Wirdum; Australia	Marianne Limpert; Canada
1998 Kuala Lumpur	Sue Rolph; England	Susie O'Neill; Australia	Rebecca Creedy; Australia
2002 Manchester	Jodie Henry; Australia	Helene Muller; South Africa	Karen Legg; England
2006 Melbourne	Libby Lenton; Australia	Jodie Henry; Australia	Alice Mills; Australia
2010 Delhi	Alicia Coutts; Australia	Emily Seebohm; Australia	Fran Halsall; England
2014 Glasgow	Cate Campbell; Australia	Bronte Campbell; Australia	Emma McKeon; Australia
2018 Gold Coast	Bronte Campbell; Australia	Cate Campbell; Australia	Taylor Ruck; Canada
2022 Birmingham	Mollie O'Callaghan; Australia	Shayna Jack; Australia	Emma McKeon; Australia
2026 Glasgow	Meg Harris; Australia	Mollie O'Callaghan; Australia	Shayna Jack; Australia

=== 200 metre freestyle ===
Games	Gold	Silver	Bronze
1970 Edinburgh	Karen Moras; Australia	Angela Coughlan; Canada	Alexandra Jackson; Isle of Man
1974 Christchurch	Sonya Gray; Australia	Jennifer Turrall; Australia	Gail Amundrud; Canada
1978 Edmonton	Rebecca Perrott; New Zealand	Tracey Wickham; Australia	Michelle Ford; Australia
1982 Brisbane	June Croft; England	Tracey Wickham; Australia	Susie Baumer; Australia
1986 Edinburgh	Susie Baumer; Australia	Jane Kerr; Canada	Ruth Gilfillan; Scotland
1990 Auckland	Hayley Lewis; Australia	Jennifer McMahon; Australia	Patricia Noall; Canada
1994 Victoria	Susie O'Neill; Australia	Nicole Stevenson; Australia	Karen Pickering; England
1998 Kuala Lumpur	Susie O'Neill; Australia	Karen Pickering; England	Jessica Deglau; Canada
2002 Manchester	Karen Pickering; England	Karen Legg; England	Elka Graham; Australia; Petria Thomas; Australia
2006 Melbourne	Caitlin McClatchey; Scotland	Libby Lenton; Australia	Melanie Marshall; England
2010 Delhi	Kylie Palmer; Australia	Jazmin Carlin; Wales	Rebecca Adlington; England
2014 Glasgow	Emma McKeon; Australia	Siobhan-Marie O'Connor; England	Bronte Barratt; Australia
2018 Gold Coast	Taylor Ruck; Canada	Ariarne Titmus; Australia	Emma McKeon; Australia
2022 Birmingham	Ariarne Titmus; Australia	Mollie O'Callaghan; Australia	Madison Wilson; Australia
2026 Glasgow	Mollie O'Callaghan; Australia	Lani Pallister; Australia	Erika Fairweather; New Zealand

=== 400 metre freestyle ===
Games	Gold	Silver	Bronze
1970 Edinburgh	Karen Moras; Australia	Denise Langford; Australia	Robyn Risson; Australia
1974 Christchurch	Jennifer Turrall; Australia	Wendy Quirk; Canada	Jaynie Parkhouse; New Zealand
1978 Edmonton	Tracey Wickham; Australia	Michelle Ford; Australia	Rebecca Perrott; New Zealand
1982 Brisbane	Tracey Wickham; Australia	Jackie Willmott; England	June Croft; England
1986 Edinburgh	Sarah Hardcastle; England	Susie Baumer; Australia	Jenny Burke; Australia
1990 Auckland	Hayley Lewis; Australia	Julie McDonald; Australia	Janelle Elford; Australia
1994 Victoria	Hayley Lewis; Australia	Stacey Gartrell; Australia	Sarah Hardcastle; England
1998 Kuala Lumpur	Susie O'Neill; Australia	Vicky Horner; England	Joanne Malar; Canada
2002 Manchester	Rebecca Cooke; England	Elka Graham; Australia	Janelle Atkinson; Jamaica
2006 Melbourne	Caitlin McClatchey; Scotland	Joanne Jackson; England	Bronte Barratt; Australia
2010 Delhi	Rebecca Adlington; England	Kylie Palmer; Australia	Jazmin Carlin; Wales
2014 Glasgow	Lauren Boyle; New Zealand	Jazmin Carlin; Wales	Bronte Barratt; Australia
2018 Gold Coast	Ariarne Titmus; Australia	Holly Hibbott; England	Ellie Faulkner; England
2022 Birmingham	Ariarne Titmus; Australia	Summer McIntosh; Canada	Kiah Melverton; Canada
2026 Glasgow	Lani Pallister; Australia	Erika Fairweather; New Zealand	Jenna Forrester; Australia

=== 800 metre freestyle ===
Games	Gold	Silver	Bronze
1970 Edinburgh	Karen Moras; Australia	Helen Gray; Australia	Robyn Risson; Australia
1974 Christchurch	Jaynie Parkhouse; New Zealand	Jennifer Turrall; Australia	Rosemary Milgate; Australia
1978 Edmonton	Tracey Wickham; Australia	Michelle Ford; Australia	Rebecca Perrott; New Zealand
1982 Brisbane	Tracey Wickham; Australia	Michelle Ford; Australia	Jackie Willmott; England
1986 Edinburgh	Sarah Hardcastle; England	Julie McDonald; Australia	Jenny Burke; Australia
1990 Auckland	Julie McDonald; Australia	Janelle Elford; Australia	Sheridan Burge-Lopez; Australia
1994 Victoria	Stacey Gartrell; Australia	Hayley Lewis; Australia	Nikki Dryden; Canada
1998 Kuala Lumpur	Rachel Harris; Australia	Joanne Malar; Canada	Sarah Collings; England
2002 Manchester	Rebecca Cooke; England	Amanda Pascoe; Australia	Janelle Atkinson; Jamaica
2006 Melbourne	Rebecca Cooke; England	Melissa Gorman; Australia	Brittany Reimer; Canada
2010 Delhi	Rebecca Adlington; England	Wendy Trott; South Africa	Melissa Gorman; Australia
2014 Glasgow	Jazmin Carlin; Wales	Lauren Boyle; New Zealand	Brittany MacLean; Canada
2018 Gold Coast	Ariarne Titmus; Australia	Jessica Ashwood; Australia	Kiah Melverton; Australia
2022 Birmingham	Ariarne Titmus; Australia	Kiah Melverton; Australia	Lani Pallister; Australia
2026 Glasgow	Lani Pallister; Australia	Erika Fairweather; New Zealand	Molly Walker; Australia

=== 1500 metre freestyle ===
Games	Gold	Silver	Bronze
2026 Glasgow	Lani Pallister; Australia	Erika Fairweather; New Zealand	Molly Walker; Australia

=== 50 metre backstroke ===
Games	Gold	Silver	Bronze
2002 Manchester	Dyana Calub; Australia	Jennifer Carroll; Canada	Sarah Price; England
2006 Melbourne	Sophie Edington; Australia	Giaan Rooney; Australia	Tayliah Zimmer; Australia
2010 Delhi	Sophie Edington; Australia	Gemma Spofforth; England	Emily Seebohm; Australia; Georgia Davies; Wales
2014 Glasgow	Georgia Davies; Wales	Lauren Quigley; England	Brooklynn Snodgrass; Canada
2018 Gold Coast	Emily Seebohm; Australia	Kylie Masse; Canada	Georgia Davies; Wales
2022 Birmingham	Kylie Masse; Canada	Mollie O'Callaghan; Australia	Kaylee McKeown; Australia
2026 Glasgow	Kylie Masse; Canada	Iona Anderson; Australia	Lauren Cox; England

=== 100 metre backstroke ===
Games	Gold	Silver	Bronze
1970 Edinburgh	Lynne Watson; Australia	Debra Cain; Australia	Donna Gurr; Canada
1974 Christchurch	Wendy Cook; Canada	Donna Gurr; Canada	Linda Young; Australia
1978 Edmonton	Debra Forster; Australia	Hélène Boivin; Canada	Cheryl Gibson; Canada
1982 Brisbane	Lisa Forrest; Australia	Georgina Parkes; Australia	Audrey Moore; Australia
1986 Edinburgh	Sylvia Hume; New Zealand	Georgina Parkes; Australia	Nicole Livingstone; Australia
1990 Auckland	Nicole Livingstone; Australia	Anna Simcic; New Zealand	Johanna Griggs; Australia
1994 Victoria	Nicole Livingstone; Australia	Elli Overton; Australia	Kathy Osher; England
1998 Kuala Lumpur	Giaan Rooney; Australia	Kelly Stefanyshyn; Canada	Meredith Smith; Australia
2002 Manchester	Sarah Price; England	Dyana Calub; Australia	Giaan Rooney; Australia
2006 Melbourne	Sophie Edington; Australia	Giaan Rooney; Australia	Melanie Marshall; England
2010 Delhi	Emily Seebohm; Australia	Gemma Spofforth; England	Julia Wilkinson; Canada
2014 Glasgow	Emily Seebohm; Australia	Georgia Davies; Wales	Belinda Hocking; Australia
2018 Gold Coast	Kylie Masse; Canada	Emily Seebohm; Australia	Taylor Ruck; Canada
2022 Birmingham	Kaylee McKeown; Australia	Kylie Masse; Canada	Medi Harris; Wales
2026 Glasgow	Iona Anderson; Australia	Kylie Masse; Canada	Olivia Nel; South Africa

=== 200 metre backstroke ===
Games	Gold	Silver	Bronze
1970 Edinburgh	Lynne Watson; Australia	Donna Gurr; Canada	Debra Cain; Australia
1974 Christchurch	Wendy Cook; Canada	Sandra Yost; Australia	Donna Gurr; Canada
1978 Edmonton	Cheryl Gibson; Canada	Lisa Forrest; Australia	Glenda Robertson; Australia
1982 Brisbane	Lisa Forrest; Australia	Georgina Parkes; Australia	Cheryl Gibson; Canada
1986 Edinburgh	Georgina Parkes; Australia	Kathy Read; England	Jodi McGibbon; Australia
1990 Auckland	Anna Simcic; New Zealand	Nicole Livingstone; Australia	Karen Lord; Australia
1994 Victoria	Nicole Livingstone; Australia	Anna Simcic; New Zealand	Elli Overton; Australia
1998 Kuala Lumpur	Katy Sexton; England	Meredith Smith; Australia	Helen Don-Duncan; England
2002 Manchester	Sarah Price; England	Joanna Fargus; England	Katy Sexton; England
2006 Melbourne	Joanna Fargus; Australia	Melanie Marshall; England	Hannah McLean; New Zealand
2010 Delhi	Meagen Nay; Australia	Lizzie Simmonds; England	Emily Seebohm; Australia
2014 Glasgow	Belinda Hocking; Australia	Emily Seebohm; Australia	Hilary Caldwell; Canada
2018 Gold Coast	Kylie Masse; Canada	Taylor Ruck; Canada	Emily Seebohm; Australia
2022 Birmingham	Kaylee McKeown; Australia	Kylie Masse; Canada	Katie Shanahan; Scotland
2026 Glasgow	Jenna Forrester; Australia	Katie Shanahan; Scotland	Hannah Fredericks; Australia

=== 50 metre breaststroke ===
Games	Gold	Silver	Bronze
2002 Manchester	Zoë Baker; England	Sarah Poewe; South Africa	Tarnee White; Australia
2006 Melbourne	Leisel Jones; Australia	Jade Edmistone; Australia	Tarnee White; Australia
2010 Delhi	Leiston Pickett; Australia	Leisel Jones; Australia	Kate Haywood; England
2014 Glasgow	Leiston Pickett; Australia	Alia Atkinson; Jamaica	Corrie Scott; Scotland
2018 Gold Coast	Sarah Vasey; England	Alia Atkinson; Jamaica	Leiston Pickett; Australia
2022 Birmingham	Lara van Niekerk; South Africa	Imogen Clark; England	Chelsea Hodges; Australia
2026 Glasgow	Lara van Niekerk; South Africa	Sienna Toohey; Australia	Imogen Clark; England Sophie Angus; Canada

=== 100 metre breaststroke ===
Games	Gold	Silver	Bronze
1970 Edinburgh	Beverley Whitfield; Australia	Dorothy Harrison; England	Christine Jarvis; England
1974 Christchurch	Christine Gaskell; England	Marian Stuart; Canada	Sandra Dickie; Scotland
1978 Edmonton	Robin Corsiglia; Canada	Maggie Kelly; England	Marian Stuart; Canada
1982 Brisbane	Kathy Bald; Canada	Anne Ottenbrite; Canada	Suki Brownsdon; England
1986 Edinburgh	Allison Higson; Canada	Jean Hill; Scotland	Dimity Douglas; Australia
1990 Auckland	Keltie Duggan; Canada	Guylaine Cloutier; Canada	Suki Brownsdon; England
1994 Victoria	Samantha Riley; Australia	Rebecca Brown; Australia	Penelope Heyns; South Africa
1998 Kuala Lumpur	Helen Denman; Australia	Samantha Riley; Australia	Lauren van Oosten; Canada
2002 Manchester	Leisel Jones; Australia	Brooke Hanson; Australia	Sarah Poewe; South Africa
2006 Melbourne	Leisel Jones; Australia	Jade Edmistone; Australia	Kirsty Balfour; Scotland
2010 Delhi	Leisel Jones; Australia	Samantha Marshall; Australia	Kate Haywood; England
2014 Glasgow	Sophie Taylor; England	Lorna Tonks; Australia	Alia Atkinson; Jamaica
2018 Gold Coast	Tatjana Schoenmaker; South Africa	Kierra Smith; Canada	Georgia Bohl; Australia
2022 Birmingham	Lara van Niekerk; South Africa	Tatjana Schoenmaker; South Africa	Chelsea Hodges; Australia
2026 Glasgow	Angharad Evans; Scotland	Aimee Canny; South Africa	Sienna Toohey; Australia

=== 200 metre breaststroke ===
Games	Gold	Silver	Bronze
1970 Edinburgh	Beverley Whitfield; Australia	Dorothy Harrison; England	Amanda Radnage; England
1974 Christchurch	Pat Beavan; Wales	Beverley Whitfield; Australia	Allison Smith; Australia
1978 Edmonton	Lisa Borsholt; Canada	Debbie Rudd; England	Maggie Kelly; England
1982 Brisbane	Anne Ottenbrite; Canada	Kathy Bald; Canada	Katherine Richardson; Canada
1986 Edinburgh	Allison Higson; Canada	Cindy Õunpuu; Canada	Dimity Douglas; Australia
1990 Auckland	Nathalie Giguère; Canada	Guylaine Cloutier; Canada	Helen Morris; Australia
1994 Victoria	Samantha Riley; Australia	Rebecca Brown; Australia	Lisa Flood; Canada
1998 Kuala Lumpur	Samantha Riley; Australia	Courtenay Chuy; Canada	Lauren van Oosten; Canada
2002 Manchester	Leisel Jones; Australia	Sarah Poewe; South Africa	Kelli Waite; Australia
2006 Melbourne	Leisel Jones; Australia	Kirsty Balfour; Scotland	Suzaan van Biljon; South Africa
2010 Delhi	Leisel Jones; Australia	Tessa Wallace; Australia	Sarah Katsoulis; Australia
2014 Glasgow	Taylor McKeown; Australia	Sally Hunter; Australia	Molly Renshaw; England
2018 Gold Coast	Tatjana Schoenmaker; South Africa	Molly Renshaw; England	Chloé Tutton; Wales
2022 Birmingham	Tatjana Schoenmaker; South Africa	Jenna Strauch; Australia	Kaylene Corbett; South Africa
2026 Glasgow	Angharad Evans; Scotland	Kaylene Corbett; South Africa	Ellie McCartney; Northern Ireland

=== 50 metre butterfly ===
Games	Gold	Silver	Bronze
2002 Manchester	Petria Thomas; Australia	Nicole Irving; Australia	Alison Sheppard; Scotland
2006 Melbourne	Danni Miatke; Australia	Jessicah Schipper; Australia	Alice Mills; Australia; Lize-Mari Retief; South Africa
2010 Delhi	Fran Halsall; England	Marieke Guehrer; Australia	Emily Seebohm; Australia
2014 Glasgow	Fran Halsall; England	Arianna Vanderpool-Wallace; Bahamas	Brittany Elmslie; Australia
2018 Gold Coast	Cate Campbell; Australia	Holly Barratt; Australia	Madeline Groves; Australia
2022 Birmingham	Emma McKeon; Australia	Erin Gallagher; South Africa	none awarded
2022 Birmingham	Emma McKeon; Australia	Holly Barratt; Australia	none awarded
2026 Glasgow	Alexandria Perkins; Australia	Erin Gallagher; South Africa	Hazel Ouwehand; New Zealand

=== 100 metre butterfly ===
Games	Gold	Silver	Bronze
1970 Edinburgh	Diane Lansley; England	Susan Smith; Canada	Allyson Mabb; Australia
1974 Christchurch	Patti Stenhouse; Canada	Kim Wickham; Scotland	Sandra Yost; Australia
1978 Edmonton	Wendy Quirk; Canada	Penny McCarthy; New Zealand	Linda Hanel; Australia
1982 Brisbane	Lisa Curry; Australia	Janet Tibbits; Australia	Michelle MacPherson; Canada
1986 Edinburgh	Caroline Cooper; England	Caroline Foot; England	Samantha Purvis; England
1990 Auckland	Lisa Curry-Kenny; Australia	Susie O'Neill; Australia	Madeleine Scarborough; England
1994 Victoria	Petria Thomas; Australia	Susie O'Neill; Australia	Elli Overton; Australia
1998 Kuala Lumpur	Petria Thomas; Australia	Susie O'Neill; Australia	Kathryn Godfrey; Australia
2002 Manchester	Petria Thomas; Australia	Mandy Loots; South Africa	Jen Button; Canada
2006 Melbourne	Jessicah Schipper; Australia	Libby Lenton; Australia	Audrey Lacroix; Canada
2010 Delhi	Alicia Coutts; Australia	Ellen Gandy; England	Jemma Lowe; Wales
2014 Glasgow	Katerine Savard; Canada	Siobhan-Marie O'Connor; England	Emma McKeon; Australia
2018 Gold Coast	Emma McKeon; Australia	Madeline Groves; Australia	Brianna Throssell; Australia
2022 Birmingham	Maggie Mac Neil; Canada	Emma McKeon; Australia	Brianna Throssell; Australia
2026 Glasgow	Alexandria Perkins; Australia	Keanna Macinnes; Scotland	Erin Gallagher; South Africa

=== 200 metre butterfly ===
Games	Gold	Silver	Bronze
1970 Edinburgh	Maree Robinson; Australia	Jane Comerford; Australia	Allyson Mabb; Australia
1974 Christchurch	Sandra Yost; Australia	Patti Stenhouse; Canada	Gail Neall; Australia
1978 Edmonton	Michelle Ford; Australia	Wendy Quirk; Canada	Linda Hanel; Australia
1982 Brisbane	Michelle Ford; Australia	Janet Tibbits; Australia	Ann Osgerby; England
1986 Edinburgh	Donna McGinnis; Canada	Karen Phillips; Australia	Jill Horstead; Canada
1990 Auckland	Hayley Lewis; Australia	Helen Morris; Australia	Nicole Redford; Australia
1994 Victoria	Susie O'Neill; Australia	Hayley Lewis; Australia	Julie Majer; Australia
1998 Kuala Lumpur	Susie O'Neill; Australia	Petria Thomas; Australia	Jessica Deglau; Canada
2002 Manchester	Petria Thomas; Australia	Georgina Lee; England	Margie Pedder; England
2006 Melbourne	Jessicah Schipper; Australia	Felicity Galvez; Australia	Terri Dunning; England
2010 Delhi	Jessicah Schipper; Australia	Audrey Lacroix; Canada	Ellen Gandy; England
2014 Glasgow	Audrey Lacroix; Canada	Aimee Willmott; England	Madeline Groves; Australia
2018 Gold Coast	Alys Thomas; Wales	Laura Taylor; Australia	Emma McKeon; Australia
2022 Birmingham	Elizabeth Dekkers; Australia	Laura Stephens; England	Brianna Throssell; Australia
2026 Glasgow	Brittany Castelluzzo; Australia	Keanna Macinnes; Scotland	Elizabeth Dekkers; Australia

=== 200 metre individual medley ===
Games	Gold	Silver	Bronze
1970 Edinburgh	Denise Langford; Australia	Shelagh Ratcliffe; England	Diana Rickard; Australia
1974 Christchurch	Leslie Cliff; Canada	Becky Smith; Canada	Susan Hunter; New Zealand
1978 Edmonton	Sharron Davies; England	Rebecca Perrott; New Zealand	Becky Smith; Canada
1982 Brisbane	Lisa Curry; Australia	Cheryl Gibson; Canada	Michelle Pearson; Australia
1986 Edinburgh	Suzie Landells; Australia	Jean Hill; Scotland	Jane Kerr; Canada
1990 Auckland	Nancy Sweetnam; Canada	Jodie Clatworthy; Australia	Hayley Lewis; Australia
1994 Victoria	Elli Overton; Australia	Marianne Limpert; Canada	Nancy Sweetnam; Canada
1998 Kuala Lumpur	Marianne Limpert; Canada	Joanne Malar; Canada	Sue Rolph; England
2002 Manchester	Kirsty Coventry; Zimbabwe	Jennifer Reilly; Australia	Marianne Limpert; Canada
2006 Melbourne	Stephanie Rice; Australia	Brooke Hanson; Australia	Lara Carroll; Australia
2010 Delhi	Alicia Coutts; Australia	Emily Seebohm; Australia	Julia Wilkinson; Canada
2014 Glasgow	Siobhan-Marie O'Connor; England	Alicia Coutts; Australia	Hannah Miley; Scotland
2018 Gold Coast	Siobhan-Marie O'Connor; England	Sarah Darcel; Canada	Erika Seltenreich-Hodgson; Canada
2022 Birmingham	Summer McIntosh; Canada	Kaylee McKeown; Australia	Abbie Wood; England
2026 Glasgow	Jenna Forrester; Australia	Aimee Canny; South Africa	Amalie Smith; England

=== 400 metre individual medley ===
Games	Gold	Silver	Bronze
1970 Edinburgh	Denise Langford; Australia	Gail Neall; Australia	Shelagh Ratcliffe; England
1974 Christchurch	Leslie Cliff; Canada	Becky Smith; Canada	Susan Hunter; New Zealand
1978 Edmonton	Sharron Davies; England	Becky Smith; Canada	Cheryl Gibson; Canada
1982 Brisbane	Lisa Curry; Australia	Michelle Pearson; Australia	Michelle MacPherson; Canada
1986 Edinburgh	Suzie Landells; Australia	Jodie Clatworthy; Australia	Sarah Hardcastle; England
1990 Auckland	Hayley Lewis; Australia	Jodie Clatworthy; Australia	Donna Procter; Australia
1994 Victoria	Elli Overton; Australia	Nancy Sweetnam; Canada	Hayley Lewis; Australia
1998 Kuala Lumpur	Joanne Malar; Canada	Elizabeth Warden; Canada	Jennifer Reilly; Australia
2002 Manchester	Jennifer Reilly; Australia	Elizabeth Van Welie; New Zealand	Jessica Abbott; Australia
2006 Melbourne	Stephanie Rice; Australia	Rebecca Cooke; England	Jennifer Reilly; Australia
2010 Delhi	Hannah Miley; Scotland	Samantha Hamill; Australia	Keri-anne Payne; England
2014 Glasgow	Hannah Miley; Scotland	Aimee Willmott; England	Keryn McMaster; Australia
2018 Gold Coast	Aimee Willmott; England	Hannah Miley; Scotland	Blair Evans; Australia
2022 Birmingham	Summer McIntosh; Canada	Kiah Melverton; Australia	Katie Shanahan; Scotland
2026 Glasgow	Jenna Forrester; Australia	Amalie Smith; England	Ella Ramsay; Australia

=== 4×100 metre freestyle relay ===
Games	Gold	Silver	Bronze
1970 Edinburgh	Australia; Debra Cain; Denise Langford; Jennifer Watts; Lynne Watson	Canada; Angela Coughlan; Karen James; Linda Hall; Susan Smith	England; Diana Sutherland; Kathryn Smith; Lesley Allardice; Sally Pickering
1974 Christchurch	Canada; Anne Jardin; Becky Smith; Gail Amundrud; Judy Wright	Australia; Debra Cain; Jennifer Turrall; Sonya Gray; Suzy Anderson	England; Alyson Jones; Avis Willington; Lesley Allardice; Susan Edmondson
1978 Edmonton	Canada; Carol Klimpel; Gail Amundrud; Susan Sloan; Wendy Quirk	England; Cheryl Brazendale; Heidi Turk; Kaye Lovatt; Sharron Davies	Australia; Lisa Burnes; Michelle Ford; Rosemary Brown; Tracey Wickham
1982 Brisbane	England; Debra Gore; Jackie Willmott; June Croft; Nicola Fibbens	Scotland; Alison Hamilton; Cathy Finlay; Nikki Ramsay; Sarah Inkson	New Zealand; Gail Jonson; Kim Dewar; Melanie Anne Jones; Pamela Croad
1986 Edinburgh	Canada; Andrea Nugent; Jane Kerr; Pamela Rai; Patricia Noall	England; Annabelle Cripps; Caroline Cooper; Nicola Fibbens; Zara Long	Australia; Angela Harris; Jacqueline Grant; Julie Pugh; Sarah Thorpe
1990 Auckland	Australia; Angela Mullens; Karen van Wirdum; Lisa Curry-Kenny; Susie O'Neill	Canada; Allison Higson; Erin Murphy; Kimberley Paton; Patricia Noall	England; June Croft; Karen Pickering; Sharron Davies; Zara Long
1994 Victoria	England; Alex Bennett; Claire Huddart; Karen Pickering; Sue Rolph	Australia; Elli Overton; Karen van Wirdum; Sarah Ryan; Susie O'Neill	Canada; Glencara Maughan; Jessica Amey; Marianne Limpert; Shannon Shakespeare
1998 Kuala Lumpur	Australia; Lori Munz; Rebecca Creedy; Sarah Ryan; Susie O'Neill	England; Claire Huddart; Karen Legg; Karen Pickering; Sue Rolph	Canada; Jessica Deglau; Laura Nicholls; Marianne Limpert; Nicole Davey
2002 Manchester	Australia; Alice Mills; Jodie Henry; Petria Thomas; Sarah Ryan	England; Melanie Marshall; Rosalind Brett; Karen Legg; Karen Pickering	Canada; Laura Nicholls; Marianne Limpert; Laura Pomeroy; Jessica Deglau
2006 Melbourne	Australia; Libby Lenton; Jodie Henry; Alice Mills; Shayne Reese	England; Melanie Marshall; Rosalind Brett; Amy Smith; Fran Halsall	Canada; Erica Morningstar; Victoria Poon; Geneviève Saumur; Sophie Simard
2010 Delhi	Australia; Alicia Coutts; Marieke Guehrer; Felicity Galvez; Emily Seebohm	England; Amy Smith; Fran Halsall; Emma Saunders; Jessica Sylvester	New Zealand; Hayley Palmer; Penelope Marshall; Amaka Gessler; Natasha Hind
2014 Glasgow	Australia; Bronte Campbell; Melanie Schlanger; Emma McKeon; Cate Campbell	England; Siobhan-Marie O'Connor; Fran Halsall; Amy Smith; Rebecca Turner	Canada; Victoria Poon; Sandrine Mainville; Michelle Williams; Alyson Ackman
2018 Gold Coast	Australia; Shayna Jack; Bronte Campbell; Emma McKeon; Cate Campbell	Canada; Alexia Zevnik; Kayla Sanchez; Penny Oleksiak; Taylor Ruck	England; Siobhan-Marie O'Connor; Freya Anderson; Anna Hopkin; Ellie Faulkner
2022 Birmingham	Australia; Madison Wilson; Shayna Jack; Mollie O'Callaghan; Emma McKeon	England; Anna Hopkin; Abbie Wood; Isabella Hindley; Freya Anderson	Canada; Summer McIntosh; Katerine Savard; Rebecca Smith; Maggie Mac Neil
2026 Glasgow	Australia; Meg Harris; Shayna Jack; Alexandria Perkins; Mollie O'Callaghan; Hannah Casey; Brittany Castelluzzo; Inez Miller; Jessica Cole	England; Eva Okaro; Freya Colbert; Leah Schlosshan; Freya Anderson; Abbie Wood; Erin Little; Darcy Revitt; Amalie Smith	South Africa; Aimee Canny; Rebecca Meder; Erin Gallagher; Olivia Nel; Georgia Nel; Jessica Thompson; Caitlin de Lange

=== 4×200 metre freestyle relay ===
Games	Gold	Silver	Bronze
1986 Edinburgh	Australia; Jenny Burke; Michelle Pearson; Sarah Thorpe; Susan Baumer	England; Annabelle Cripps; Karen Mellor; Sarah Hardcastle; Zara Long	Canada; Donna McGinnis; Jane Kerr; Patricia Noall; Sophie Dufour
1990 Auckland	Australia; Hayley Lewis; Janelle Elford; Jennifer McMahon; Julie McDonald	England; Joanna Coull; Judy Lancaster; June Croft; Sharron Davies	New Zealand; Linda Robinson; Michelle Burke; Phillippa Langrell; Sharon Hanley
1994 Victoria	Australia; Anna Windsor; Hayley Lewis; Nicole Stevenson; Susie O'Neill	England; Alex Bennett; Claire Huddart; Karen Pickering; Sarah Hardcastle	Canada; Donna Wu; Joanne Malar; Marianne Limpert; Stephanie Richardson
1998 Kuala Lumpur	Australia; Anna Windsor; Julia Greville; Lori Munz; Susie O'Neill	England; Claire Huddart; Karen Legg; Karen Pickering; Lyndsey Cooper	Canada; Andrea Schwartz; Jessica Deglau; Joanne Malar; Laura Nicholls
2002 Manchester	England; Karen Legg; Georgina Lee; Joanna Fargus; Karen Pickering	Australia; Elka Graham; Giaan Rooney; Rebecca Creedy; Petria Thomas	none awarded as there was only four teams competing.
2006 Melbourne	Australia; Libby Lenton; Bronte Barratt; Kelly Stubbins; Linda Mackenzie	England; Joanne Jackson; Kate Richardson; Julia Beckett; Melanie Marshall	New Zealand; Lauren Boyle; Helen Norfolk; Alison Fitch; Melissa Ingram
2010 Delhi	Australia; Kylie Palmer; Blair Evans; Bronte Barratt; Meagen Nay	New Zealand; Lauren Boyle; Penelope Marshall; Amaka Gessler; Natasha Hind	England; Joanne Jackson; Rebecca Adlington; Emma Saunders; Sasha Matthews
2014 Glasgow	Australia; Emma McKeon; Alicia Coutts; Brittany Elmslie; Bronte Barratt	Canada; Samantha Cheverton; Brittany MacLean; Alyson Ackman; Emily Overholt	England; Siobhan-Marie O'Connor; Amelia Maughan; Ellie Faulkner; Rebecca Turner
2018 Gold Coast	Australia; Emma McKeon; Brianna Throssell; Leah Neale; Ariarne Titmus	Canada; Penny Oleksiak; Kayla Sanchez; Rebecca Smith; Taylor Ruck	England; Ellie Faulkner; Siobhan-Marie O'Connor; Freya Anderson; Holly Hibbott
2022 Birmingham	Australia; Madison Wilson; Kiah Melverton; Mollie O'Callaghan; Ariarne Titmus	Canada; Summer McIntosh; Ella Jansen; Mary-Sophie Harvey; Katerine Savard	England; Freya Colbert; Tamryn van Selm; Abbie Wood; Freya Anderson
2026 Glasgow	Australia; Lani Pallister; Hannah Casey; Inez Miller; Mollie O'Callaghan	England; Freya Colbert; Abbie Wood; Leah Schlosshan; Freya Anderson	New Zealand; Erika Fairweather; Caitlin Deans; Eve Thomas; Milana Tapper

=== 4×100 metre medley relay ===
Games	Gold	Silver	Bronze
1970 Edinburgh	Australia; Allyson Mabb; Beverley Whitfield; Denise Langford; Lynne Watson	England; Diane Lansley; Dorothy Harrison; Kathryn Smith; Sylvia Platt	Canada; Angela Coughlan; Donna Gurr; Susan Smith; Sylvia Dockerill
1974 Christchurch	Canada; Gail Amundrud; Marian Stuart; Patti Stenhouse; Wendy Cook	Australia; Beverley Whitfield; Debra Cain; Linda Young; Sonya Gray	Scotland; Gillian Fordyce; Kim Wickham; Morag McGlashan; Sandra Dickie
1978 Edmonton	Canada; Carol Klimpel; Hélène Boivin; Marian Stuart; Wendy Quirk	Australia; Debra Forster; Lisa Curry-Kenny; Rosemary Brown; Tracey Wickham	England; Helen Gilyard; Margaret Kelly; Sharron Davies; Sue Jenner
1982 Brisbane	Canada; Anne Ottenbrite; Cheryl Gibson; Maureen New; Michelle MacPherson	England; Ann Osgerby; Catherine White; June Croft; Suki Brownsdon	Scotland; Beverley Rose; Cathy Finlay; Nicola Geddes; Nikki Ramsay
1986 Edinburgh	England; Caroline Cooper; Nicola Fibbens; Simone Hindmarch; Suki Brownsdon	Canada; Allison Higson; Barbara McBain; Donna McGinnis; Jane Kerr	Australia; Angela Harris; Dimity Douglas; Georgina Parkes; Karen Phillips
1990 Auckland	Australia; Karen van Wirdum; Lara Hooiveld; Lisa Curry-Kenny; Nicole Livingstone	England; Joanne Deakins; Karen Pickering; Madeleine Scarborough; Suki Brownsdon	Canada; Keltie Duggan; Lori Melien; Nancy Sweetnam; Patricia Noall
1994 Victoria	Australia; Karen van Wirdum; Nicole Stevenson; Petria Thomas; Samantha Riley	England; Alex Bennett; Karen Pickering; Kathy Osher; Marie Hardiman	Canada; Beth Hazel; Jessica Amey; Lisa Flood; Marianne Limpert
1998 Kuala Lumpur	Australia; Giaan Rooney; Helen Denman; Petria Thomas; Susie O'Neill	Canada; Kelly Stefanyshyn; Lauren van Oosten; Marianne Limpert; Sara Alroubaie	England; Caroline Foot; Jaime King; Sarah Price; Sue Rolph
2002 Manchester	Australia; Dyana Calub; Leisel Jones; Petria Thomas; Jodie Henry	South Africa; Charlene Wittstock; Sarah Poewe; Mandy Loots; Helene Muller	England; Sarah Price; Kate Haywood; Georgina Lee; Karen Legg
2006 Melbourne	Australia; Sophie Edington; Leisel Jones; Jessicah Schipper; Libby Lenton	England; Melanie Marshall; Kate Haywood; Terri Dunning; Fran Halsall	Canada; Kelly Stefanyshyn; Lauren van Oosten; Audrey Lacroix; Erica Morningstar
2010 Delhi	Australia; Emily Seebohm; Leisel Jones; Jessicah Schipper; Alicia Coutts	England; Gemma Spofforth; Kate Haywood; Ellen Gandy; Fran Halsall	Canada; Julia Wilkinson; Annamay Pierse; Audrey Lacroix; Victoria Poon
2014 Glasgow	Australia; Emily Seebohm; Lorna Tonks; Emma McKeon; Cate Campbell	England; Lauren Quigley; Sophie Taylor; Siobhan-Marie O'Connor; Fran Halsall	Canada; Sinéad Russell; Tera van Beilen; Katerine Savard; Sandrine Mainville
2018 Gold Coast	Australia; Emily Seebohm; Georgia Bohl; Emma McKeon; Bronte Campbell	Canada; Kylie Masse; Kierra Smith; Penny Oleksiak; Taylor Ruck	Wales; Georgia Davies; Chloé Tutton; Alys Thomas; Kathryn Greenslade
2022 Birmingham	Australia; Kaylee McKeown; Chelsea Hodges; Emma McKeon; Mollie O'Callaghan	Canada; Kylie Masse; Sophie Angus; Maggie Mac Neil; Summer McIntosh	England; Lauren Cox; Molly Renshaw; Laura Stephens; Anna Hopkin
2026 Glasgow	Australia; Iona Anderson; Sienna Toohey; Alexandria Perkins; Meg Harris; Hannah Fredericks; Brittany Castelluzzo; Mollie O'Callaghan	Scotland; Katie Shanahan; Angharad Evans; Keanna Macinnes; Evie Davis; Holly McGill; Anna Morgan; Ciara Schlosshan; Emma Wood	South Africa; Olivia Nel; Aimee Canny; Erin Gallagher; Rebecca Meder; Jessica Thompson; Lara van Niekerk; Georgia Nel

== Para swimming events ==
=== 50 metre freestyle S8 ===
Games	Gold	Silver	Bronze
2018 Gold Coast	Lakeisha Patterson; Australia	Morgan Bird; Canada	Abigail Tripp; Canada

=== 50 metre freestyle S9 ===
Games	Gold	Silver	Bronze
2010 Delhi	Natalie du Toit; South Africa	Annabelle Williams; Australia	Stephanie Millward; England

=== 50 metre freestyle S13 ===
Games	Gold	Silver	Bronze
2022 Birmingham	Katja Dedekind; Australia	Hannah Russell; England	Kirralee Hayes; Australia
2026 Glasgow	Kirralee Hayes; Australia	Danika Vyncka; South Africa	Jenna Jones; Australia

=== 100 metre freestyle S8 ===
Games	Gold	Silver	Bronze
2014 Glasgow	Maddison Elliott; Australia	Stephanie Slater; England	Lakeisha Patterson; Australia

=== 100 metre freestyle S9 ===
Games	Gold	Silver	Bronze
1994 Victoria	Melissa Carlton; Australia	Claire Bishop; England	Kelly Barnes; Australia
2010 Delhi	Natalie du Toit; South Africa	Stephanie Millward; England	Ellie Cole; Australia
2018 Gold Coast	Lakeisha Patterson; Australia	Alice Tai; England	Ellie Cole; Australia
2022 Birmingham	Sophie Pascoe; New Zealand	Emily Beecroft; Australia	Toni Shaw; Scotland
2026 Glasgow	Lakeisha Patterson; Australia	Emily Beecroft; Australia	Toni Shaw; Scotland

=== 100 metre freestyle S13 ===
Games	Gold	Silver	Bronze
2026 Glasgow	Jenna Jones; Australia	Ela Letton-Jones; Wales	Kirralee Hayes; Australia

=== 200 metre freestyle S14 ===
Games	Gold	Silver	Bronze
2022 Birmingham	Bethany Firth; Northern Ireland	Jessica-Jane Applegate; England	Louise Fiddes; England
2026 Glasgow	Georgia Sheffield; England	Poppy Maskill; England	Bethany Firth; Northern Ireland

=== 100 metre backstroke S8 ===
Games	Gold	Silver	Bronze
2022 Birmingham	Alice Tai; England	Tupou Neiufi; New Zealand	Lily Rice; Wales

=== 100 metre backstroke S9 ===
Games	Gold	Silver	Bronze
2018 Gold Coast	Alice Tai; England	Ellie Cole; Australia	Ashleigh McConnell; Australia
2026 Glasgow	Alice Tai; England	Gemma Sellick; Australia	Victoria Belando Nicholson; Australia

=== 100 metre breaststroke SB6 ===
Games	Gold	Silver	Bronze
2022 Birmingham	Maisie Summers-Newton; England	Grace Harvey; England	Camille Bérubé; Canada

=== 100 metre breaststroke SB8 ===
Games	Gold	Silver	Bronze
2026 Glasgow	Brock Whiston; England	Husnah Kukundakwe; Uganda	Iona Winnifrith; England

=== 100 metre breaststroke SB9 ===
Games	Gold	Silver	Bronze
2014 Glasgow	Sophie Pascoe; New Zealand	Madeleine Scott; Australia	Erraid Davies; Scotland
2018 Gold Coast	Sophie Pascoe; New Zealand	Paige Leonhardt; Australia	Madeleine Scott; Australia

=== 50 metre butterfly S7 ===
Games	Gold	Silver	Bronze
2018 Gold Coast	Ellie Robinson; England	Sarah Mehain; Canada	none awarded

=== 100 metre butterfly S9 ===
Games	Gold	Silver	Bronze
2010 Delhi	Natalie du Toit; South Africa	Stephanie Millward; England	Ellie Cole; Australia

=== 200 metre individual medley SM10 ===
Games	Gold	Silver	Bronze
2014 Glasgow	Sophie Pascoe; New Zealand	Katherine Downie; Australia	Aurélie Rivard; Canada
2018 Gold Coast	Sophie Pascoe; New Zealand	Aurélie Rivard; Canada	Katherine Downie; Australia
2022 Birmingham	Jasmine Greenwood; Australia	Aurélie Rivard; Canada	Keira Stephens; Australia
2026 Glasgow	Faye Rogers; Scotland	Jasmine Greenwood; Australia	Mary Jibb; Canada

== Discontinued events ==
=== 100 yard freestyle ===
Games	Gold	Silver	Bronze
1930	Joyce Cooper (ENG)	Ellen King (SCO)	Valerie Davies (WAL)
1934	Phyllis Dewar (CAN)	Irene Pirie (CAN)	Jean McDowell (SCO)

=== 110 yard freestyle ===
Games	Gold	Silver	Bronze
1938	Evelyn de Lacy (AUS)	Dorothy Green (AUS)	Dorothy Lyon (CAN)
1950	Marjorie McQuade (AUS)	Margaret Wellington (ENG)	(South Africa) Joan Harrison (SAF)
1954	Lorraine Crapp (AUS)	Virginia Grant (CAN)	Joan Harrison (SAF)
1958	Dawn Fraser (AUS)	Lorraine Crapp (AUS)	Alva Colquhoun (AUS)
1962	Dawn Fraser (AUS)	Robyn Thorn (AUS)	Mary Stewart (CAN)
1966	Marion Lay (CAN)	Lyn Bell (AUS)	Jan Murphy (AUS)

=== 400 yard freestyle ===
Games	Gold	Silver	Bronze
1930	Joyce Cooper (ENG)	Valerie Davies (WAL)	Cissie Stewart (SCO)

=== 440 yard freestyle ===
Games	Gold	Silver	Bronze
1934	Phyllis Dewar (CAN)	(South Africa) Jenny Maakal (SAF)	Irene Pirie (CAN)
1938	Dorothy Green (AUS)	Margaret Jeffery (ENG)	Mona Leydon (NZL)
1950	(South Africa) Joan Harrison (SAF)	Margaret Wellington (ENG)	Denise Norton (AUS)
1954	Lorraine Crapp (AUS)	Gladys Priestley (CAN)	Margaret Girvan (SCO)
1958	Ilsa Konrads (AUS)	Dawn Fraser (AUS)	Lorraine Crapp (AUS)
1962	Dawn Fraser (AUS)	Ilsa Konrads (AUS)	Liz Long (ENG)
1966	Kathy Wainwright (AUS)	Jenny Thorn (AUS)	Kim Herford (AUS)

=== 100 yard backstroke ===
Games	Gold	Silver	Bronze
1930	Joyce Cooper (ENG)	Valerie Davies (WAL)	Phyllis Harding (ENG)
1934	Phyllis Harding (ENG)	Margot Hamilton (SCO)	Valerie Davies (WAL)

=== 110 yard backstroke ===
Games	Gold	Silver	Bronze
1938	Pat Norton (AUS)	Jeanne Greenland (WAL)	Margot Hamilton (SCO)
1950	Judy-Joy Davies (AUS)	Jean Stewart (NZL)	Helen Yate (ENG)
1954	Joan Harrison (SAF)	Pat Symons (ENG)	Jean Stewart (NZL)
1958	Judy Grinham (ENG)	Margaret Edwards (ENG)	Philippa Gould (NZL)
1962	Linda Ludgrove (ENG)	Pam Sergeant (AUS)	Sylvia Lewis (ENG)
1966	Linda Ludgrove (ENG)	Elaine Tanner (CAN)	Janet Franklin (ENG)

=== 220 yard backstroke ===
Games	Gold	Silver	Bronze
1962	Linda Ludgrove (ENG)	Sylvia Lewis (ENG)	Pam Sergeant (AUS)
1966	Linda Ludgrove (ENG)	Elaine Tanner (CAN)	Margaret Macrae (NZL)

=== 110 yard breaststroke ===
Games	Gold	Silver	Bronze
1962	Anita Lonsbrough (ENG)	Vivien Haddon (NZL)	Dorinda Fraser (ENG)
1966	Diana Harris (ENG)	Jill Slattery (ENG)	Heather Saville (AUS)

=== 200 yard breaststroke ===
Games	Gold	Silver	Bronze
1930	Cecelia Wolstenholme (ENG)	Margery Hinton (ENG)	Ellen King (SCO)
1934	Clare Dennis (AUS)	Phyllis Haslam (CAN)	Margery Hinton (ENG)

=== 220 yard breaststroke ===
Games	Gold	Silver	Bronze
1938	Doris Storey (ENG)	(South Africa) Carla Gerke (SAF)	Joan Langdon (CAN)
1950	Elenor Gordon (SCO)	Nancy Lyons (AUS)	Elizabeth Church (ENG)
1954	Elenor Gordon (SCO)	Mary Morgan (SAF)	Margaret Grundy (ENG)
1958	Anita Lonsbrough (ENG)	Jackie Dyson (ENG)	Christine Gosden (ENG)
1962	Anita Lonsbrough (ENG)	Jacqueline Enfield (ENG)	Vivien Haddon (NZL)
1966	Jill Slattery (ENG)	Stella Mitchell (ENG)	Vivien Haddon (NZL)

=== 110 yard butterfly ===
Games	Gold	Silver	Bronze
1958	Beverley Bainbridge (AUS)	Tessa Staveley (NZL)	Margaret Iwasaki (CAN)
1962	Mary Stewart (CAN)	Mary-Anne Cotterill (ENG)	Linda McGill (AUS)
1966	Elaine Tanner (CAN)	Judy Gegan (ENG)	Ann Barner (ENG)

=== 220 yard butterfly ===
Games	Gold	Silver	Bronze
1966	Elaine Tanner (CAN)	Marilyn Corson (CAN)	Ann Barner (ENG)

=== 440 yard individual medley ===
Games	Gold	Silver	Bronze
1962	Anita Lonsbrough (ENG)	Linda McGill (AUS)	Jennifer Corish (AUS)
1966	Elaine Tanner (CAN)	Jan Murphy (AUS)	Jane Hughes (CAN)

=== 4×100 yard freestyle relay ===
Games	Gold	Silver	Bronze
1930	England; Joyce Cooper; Doreen Cooper; Olive Joynes; Phyllis Harding	Canada; Betty Edwards; Irene Pirie; Marjorie Linton; Peggy Bailey	Scotland; Cissie Stewart; Ellen King; Jean McDowell; Jessie McVey

=== 4×110 yard freestyle relay ===
Games	Gold	Silver	Bronze
1934	Canada; Phyllis Dewar; Florence Humble; Margaret Hutton; Irene Pirie	South Africa; Jenny Maakal; Enid Hayward; Kathleen Russell; Molly Ryde	England; Edna Hughes; Beatrice Wolstenholme; Olive Bartle; Margery Hinton
1938	Canada; Noel Oxenbury; Dorothy Lyon; Mary Baggaley; Phyllis Dewar	Australia; Dorothy Green; Evelyn de Lacy; Margaret Rawson; Pat Norton	England; Edna Hughes; Joyce Harrowby; Margery Hinton; Zilpha Grant
1950	Australia; Denise Spencer; Denise Norton; Judy-Joy Davies; Marjorie McQuade	New Zealand; Joan Hastings; Kristin Jacobi; Norma Bridson; Winifred Griffin	England; Grace Wood; Helen Yate; Lillian Preece; Margaret Wellington
1954	South Africa; Felicity Loveday; Joan Harrison; Machduldt Petzer; Natalie Myburgh	Canada; Beth Whittall; Gladys Priestley; Helen Stewart; Virginia Grant	England; Diana Wilkinson; Fearne Ewart; Jean Botham; Valerie Nares-Pillow
1958	Australia; Alva Colquhoun; Dawn Fraser; Lorraine Crapp; Sandra Morgan	Canada; Gladys Priestley; Margaret Iwasaki; S.J. Sangster; Sara Barber	England; Beryl Noakes; Diana Wilkinson; Judy Grinham; Anne Marshall
1962	Australia; Dawn Fraser; Lyn Bell; Robyn Thorn; Ruth Everuss	Canada; M. Sevigny; Mary Stewart; Patty Thompson; Sara Barber	England; Diana Wilkinson; Liz Long; Linda Amos; Sandra Keen
1966	Canada; Elaine Tanner; Jane Hughes; Louise Kennedy; Marion Lay	Australia; Janet Steinbeck; Jan Murphy; Lyn Bell; Marion Smith	England; Diana Wilkinson; Jeanette Cave; Pauline Sillett; Susan Cope

=== 3×110 yard medley relay ===
Games	Gold	Silver	Bronze
1934	Canada; Margaret Hutton; Phyllis Haslam; Phyllis Dewar	England; Phyllis Harding; Vera Kingston; Edna Hughes	Scotland; Jean McDowell; Margot Hamilton; Margaret McCullum
1938	England; Doris Storey; Lorna Frampton; Margery Hinton	South Africa; Carla Gerke; Hazel Holmes; Molly Ryde	Australia; Evelyn de Lacy; Pat Norton; Valerie George
1950	Australia; Judy-Joy Davies; Marjorie McQuade; Nancy Lyons	England; Elizabeth Church; Helen Yate; Margaret Wellington	Scotland; Elizabeth Turner; Elenor Gordon; Margaret Girvan
1954	Scotland; Helen Gordon; Margaret McDowall; Margaret Girvan	South Africa; Joan Harrison; Machduldt Petzer; Mary Morgan	Australia; Jann Grier; Judith Knight; Lorraine Crapp

=== 4×110 yard medley relay ===
Games	Gold	Silver	Bronze
1958	England; Judy Grinham; Anita Lonsbrough; Christine Gosden; Diana Wilkinson	Australia; Alva Colquhoun; Barbara Evans; Beverley Bainbridge; Gergaynia Beckett	Canada; Gladys Priestley; I.C.B. Service; Margaret Iwasaki; Sara Barber
1962	Australia; Dawn Fraser; Linda McGill; Marguerite Ruygrok; Pamela Sergeant	England; Anita Lonsbrough; Diana Wilkinson; Linda Ludgrove; Mary-Anne Cotterill	Canada; A.J. Glendenning; Mary Stewart; Patty Thompson; Sara Barber
1966	England; Diana Harris; Judy Gegan; Linda Ludgrove; Pauline Sillett	Canada; Donna Ross; Elaine Tanner; Louise Kennedy; Marion Lay	Australia; Allyson Mabb; Heather Saville; Jill Pauline Groeger; Lyn Bell

== See also ==
- List of Commonwealth Games medallists in swimming (men)
