= Australia at the 1974 British Commonwealth Games =

- CG code: AUS
- CGA: Australian Commonwealth Games Association
- Website: commonwealthgames.org.au

in Christchurch, New Zealand
- Competitors: 168 in 10 sports
- Flag bearers: Opening: Michael Wenden; Closing:
- Officials: 34
- Medals Ranked 1st: Gold 29 Silver 28 Bronze 25 Total 82

British Commonwealth Games appearances
- 1930; 1934; 1938; 1950; 1954; 1958; 1962; 1966; 1970; 1974; 1978; 1982; 1986; 1990; 1994; 1998; 2002; 2006; 2010; 2014; 2018; 2022; 2026; 2030

Australia competed at the 1974 British Commonwealth Games in Christchurch New Zealand from 24 January to 2 February 1974. It was Australia's tenth appearance at the Commonwealth Games, having competed at every Games since their inception in 1930.

Australia won medals in eight of the ten sports that it entered.

== Medallists ==
The following Australian competitors won medals at the games.

Medal	Name	Sport	Event
Gold	Greg Lewis Laurie D'Arcy Andrew Ratcliffe Graham Haskell	Athletics	Men's 4 × 100 metres relay
Gold	Don Baird	Athletics	Men's Pole Vault
Gold	Gordon Windeyer	Athletics	Men's High Jump
Gold	Raylene Boyle	Athletics	Women's 100m
Gold	Raylene Boyle	Athletics	Women's 200m
Gold	Charlene Rendina	Athletics	Women's 800m
Gold	Jenny Lamy Denise Robertson Raelene Boyle Robyn Boak	Athletics	Women's 4 × 100m Relay
Gold	Petra Rivers	Athletics	Women's javelin throw
Gold	Dick Paris	Cycling	Men's Time Trial
Gold	John Nicholson	Cycling	Men's Sprint
Gold	Clyde Sefton	Cycling	Men's Road Race
Gold	Don Wagstaff	Diving	Men's 3m Springboard
Gold	Don Wagstaff	Diving	Men's 10m Platform
Gold	Yvonne Gowland	Shooting	Small Bore Rifle
Gold	Michael Wenden	Swimming	Men's 100m Freestyle
Gold	Steve Badger	Swimming	Men's 200m Freestyle
Gold	John Kulasalu	Swimming	Men's 400m Freestyle
Gold	Steve Holland	Swimming	Men's 1500m Freestyle
Gold	Mark Tonelli	Swimming	Men's 100m Backstroke
Gold	Brad Cooper	Swimming	Men's 200m Backstroke
Gold	Neil Rogers	Swimming	Men's 100m Butterfly
Gold	John Kulasalu Michael Wenden Robert Nay Steve Badger	Swimming	Men's 4 × 200 m Freestyle Relay
Gold	Sonia Gray	Swimming	Women's 100m Freestyle
Gold	Sonia Gray	Swimming	Women's 200m Freestyle
Gold	Jenny Turrall	Swimming	Women's 400m Freestyle
Gold	Sandra Yost	Swimming	Women's 200m Butterfly
Gold	Michael Adams	Weightlifting	Men's Bantamweight
Gold	Nick Ciancio	Weightlifting	Men's Middle Heavyweight
Gold	George Vasiliades	Weightlifting	Men's Featherweight
Silver	Bruce Field	Athletics	Men's 400m Hurdles
Silver	Lawrie Peckham	Athletics	Men's High Jump
Silver	Chris Commons	Athletics	Men's Long Jump
Silver	Denise Robertson	Athletics	Women's 200m
Silver	Gaye Dell	Athletics	Women's 100m Hurdles
Silver	Charlene Rendina Judy Canty Margaret Ramsay Terri Cater	Athletics	Women's 4 × 400m Relay
Silver	Jenny Symon	Athletics	Women's Javelin Throw
Silver	John Nicholson	Cycling	Men's Time Trial
Silver	Murray Hall Kevin Nichols Garry Reardon Gary Sutton	Cycling	Men's Team Pursuit
Silver	Murray Hall	Cycling	Men's 10 mile Scratch
Silver	John Rush Danny O'Neill	Cycling	Men's Tandem
Silver	Andrew Jackomos	Diving	Men's 10m Platform
Silver	Clive White	Lawn bowls	Men's Singles
Silver	Robert King Errol Bungey Errol Stewart Keith Poole	Lawn bowls	Men's Fours
Silver	Norman Harrison	Shooting	Free Pistol
Silver	Brad Cooper	Swimming	Men's 400m Freestyle
Silver	Mark Tonelli	Swimming	Men's 200m Backstroke
Silver	Ross Seymour	Swimming	Men's 200m Butterfly
Silver	Michael Wenden Neil Rogers Peter Coughlan Ross Patterson	Swimming	Men's 4 × 100 m Freestyle Relay
Silver	Mark Tonelli Michael Wenden Neil Rogers Nigel Cluer	Swimming	Men's 4 × 100 m Medley Relay
Silver	Jenny Turrall	Swimming	Women's 200m Freestyle
Silver	Jenny Turrall	Swimming	Women's 800m Freestyle
Silver	Sandra Yost	Swimming	Women's 200m Backstroke
Silver	Beverley Whitfield	Swimming	Women's 200m Breaststroke
Silver	Debra Cain Jenny Turrall Sonya Gray Suzy Anderson	Swimming	Women's 4 × 100m Freestyle Relay
Silver	Beverley Whitfield Debra Cain Linda Young Sonya Gray	Swimming	Women's 4 × 100m Medley Relay
Silver	Gerald Hay	Weightlifting	Men's Featherweight
Silver	Wally Koenig	Wrestling	Men's Light Flyweight
Bronze	Max Binnington	Athletics	Men's 110m Hurdles
Bronze	Peter Fullager	Athletics	Men's 20 miles Walk
Bronze	Peter Farmer	Athletics	Men's Hammer Throw
Bronze	Rob Lethbridge	Athletics	Men's Decathlon
Bronze	Denise Robertson	Athletics	Women's 100m
Bronze	Charlene Rendina	Athletics	Women's 400m
Bronze	Jean Roberts	Athletics	Women's Shot Put
Bronze	Gary Sutton	Cycling	Men's Individual Pursuit
Bronze	Remo Sansonetti	Cycling	Men's Road Race
Bronze	Madeleine Barnett	Diving	Women's 10m Platform
Bronze	Robin Bailey	Shooting	Skeet Rifle
Bronze	Michael Wenden	Swimming	Men's 200m Freestyle
Bronze	Steve Badger	Swimming	Men's 400m Freestyle
Bronze	Steve Badger	Swimming	Men's 1500m Freestyle
Bronze	Brad Cooper	Swimming	Men's 100m Backstroke
Bronze	Robert Williams	Swimming	Men's 200m Backstroke
Bronze	Rosemary Milgate	Swimming	Women's 800m Freestyle
Bronze	Linda Young	Swimming	Women's 100m Backstroke
Bronze	Alison Smith	Swimming	Women's 200m Breaststroke
Bronze	Sandra Yost	Swimming	Women's 100m Butterfly
Bronze	Gail Neall	Swimming	Women's 200m Butterfly
Bronze	Steve Wyatt	Weightlifting	Men's Middle Heavyweight
Bronze	John Navie	Wrestling	Men's Flyweight
Bronze	Kevin Burke	Wrestling	Men's Bantamweight
Bronze	Ray Brown	Wrestling	Men's Featherweight

Medals by sport
Sport	1st place, gold medalist(s)	2nd place, silver medalist(s)	3rd place, bronze medalist(s)	
Swimming	12	11	10	33
Athletics	8	7	7	22
Cycling	3	4	2	9
Weightlifting	3	1	1	5
Diving	2	1	1	4
Shooting	1	1	1	3
Lawn bowls	0	2	0	2
Wrestling	0	1	3	4
Total	29	28	25	82

== Officials ==
General Manager - Bill Young
Assistant Manager & Advance Party - Les Martyn
Assistant Managers Women - Gwen Chester, Dorothy Nordahl
Asministraive Officer & Advanmce Party - Ivan Lund
Transport Officer - Arthur Tunstall
Team Secretary - Peggy Tunstall
Medical Officer - Dr Anthony 'Tony' Miller; Physiotherapist - Thomas Dobson; Masseurs - Percy Barnes, George Saunders
Section Officials - Athletics Manager - Ray Durie, Athletics Assistant Manager - Clive Lee, Athletics Coaches - Alan Barlow, John Daly, Henri Schubert; Badminton Manager - Don Stockins, Badminton Coach - Ian Hutchinson; Boxing Manager - Leslie Harold, Boxing Coach - Denis Dack; Cycling Manager - Leslie Dunn, Cycling Coaches - Keith Reynolds, Max Leslie; Shooting Manager - Tibor Gonzol, Shooting Training Co-ordinator - Dr Robery Godfrey; Swimming Manager - Joe King, Swimming Coaches - Ursula Carlile, David Urry; Diving Coach - Bruce Prance; Weightlifting Manager - Max Ryan, Weightlifting Coach - Robert Taylor ' Wrestling Manager - William Howden, Wrestling Coach - Choudhry Ashraf

== See also ==
- Australia at the 1972 Summer Olympics
- Australia at the 1976 Summer Olympics
