= Swimming New Zealand =

Governing body of swimming in New Zealand

- IOC nation: NZL
- Sport: Swimming
- Official website: www.swimming.org.nz

History
- Year of formation: 1890
- Former names: New Zealand Amateur Swimming Association

Affiliations
- International federation: Fédération Internationale de Natation (FINA)
- FINA members page: www.fina.org
- Continental association: Oceania Swimming Association
- National Olympic Committee: New Zealand Olympic Committee
- National Paralympic Committee: Paralympics New Zealand

Board
- President: Ron Clarke
- Board: Debbie Pattullo (Chair); Pip Jamieson (Deputy Chair)

Organisation Structure
- Chief Executive: Steve Johns
- Secretary General: Steve Johns
- Finance Manager: Peter Carroll
- Head of Participation & Events: Dale Johnson

Swimming New Zealand is the national governing body of swimming, in New Zealand. Swimming New Zealand, then known as The New Zealand Amateur Swimming Association was founded on 4 January 1890.

Swimming New Zealand is a member of FINA and has responsibility for elite performance, doping control and international relationships and events for the sports within New Zealand.

Swimming New Zealand is also a member of Water Safety New Zealand and has an active role in swim and survive education in New Zealand.

== History ==
The New Zealand Amateur Swimming Association was founded on 4 January 1890 at the urging of the Auckland (Swimming) Club, and was based in Auckland. When the headquarters moved to Christchurch in 1896 the Auckland club withdrew from the Association and in 1898 formed a rival association, the New Zealand Amateur Swimming Association Registered. The two associations were reunited on 21 March 1904.

The first national championship events were held in the year the Association was formed, with a different carnival for each event until 1905 when all events were held at a single venue.

The first championship event for women was held in 1912.

The NZASA became the New Zealand Swimming Federation in 1988 and changed to its present name in 1999.

== New Zealand Swimmers of the Year (Baxter O'Neill Trophy) ==
Swimming New Zealand announces a number of awards annually, most notably the New Zealand Swimmer of the Year Award.

The trophy is in recognition of the contribution of James Baxter O'Neill MBE who was the secretary of the New Zealand Amateur Swimming Association for 42 years following his election in 1919, and life member. It was first awarded in 1958.

| Year | Winner | Affiliation | Club |
|---|---|---|---|
| 1958 | Tessa Staveley | Auckland | |
| 1960 | Dave Gerrard | Auckland | Mt Eden Amateur Swimming Club |
| 1961 | Miss L Moore | Wellington | |
| 1962 | Len Hodge | Canterbury | Spreydon |
| 1963 | B Robertson | Auckland | Mt Eden Amateur Swimming Club |
| 1964 | Shirley Nicholson | Canterbury | Spreydon |
| 1965 | Robert Walker | Wellington | |
| 1966 | Heather Kerr | Auckland | |
| 1967 | Dave Gerrard | Auckland | Mt Eden Amateur Swimming Club |
| 1968 | Tui Shipston | Canterbury | Elmwood |
| 1968 | Tui Shipston | Canterbury | Elmwood |
| 1970 | Judith Wright | Canterbury | Sockburn Park |
| 1971 | Mark Treffers | Southland | |
| 1972 | Susan Hunter | Canterbury | Wharenui Swimming Club |
| 1973 | Mark Treffers | Canterbury | Wharenui Swimming Club |
| 1974 | Mark Treffers | Canterbury | Wharenui Swimming Club |
| 1975 | Jaynie Parkhouse | Canterbury | Wharenui Swimming Club |
| 1976 | Monique Rodahl | Auckland | North Shore Swim Club |
| 1981 | Anne Farghar | | |
| 1983 | Mark Graham | Auckland | |
| 1985 | Gary Hurring | Auckland | |
| 1986 | Anthony Mosse | Auckland | Roskill Swimming Club |
| 1987 | Anthony Mosse | Auckland | Roskill Swimming Club |
| 1989 | Anthony Mosse | Auckland | Roskill Swimming Club |
| | Paul Kingsman | Auckland | Roskill Swimming Club |
| 2010 | Moss Burmester | Swimming Auckland | |
| 2011 | Glenn Snyders | Swimming Auckland | North Shore Swim Club |
| 2012 | Lauren Boyle | Swimming Auckland | |
| 2013 | Lauren Boyle | Swimming Auckland | |
| 2014 | Lauren Boyle | Swimming Auckland | |
| 2015 | Lauren Boyle | Swimming Auckland | United Swimming Club |
| 2016 | Lauren Boyle | Swimming Auckland | |
| 2017 | Sophie Pascoe | Swimming Canterbury West Coast | QEII |
| 2018 | Lewis Clareburt | Swimming Wellington | Capital Swim Club |
| 2019 | Lewis Clareburt | Swimming Wellington | Capital Swim Club |
| 2020 | | | |
| 2021 | Lewis Clareburt | Swimming Wellington | Capital Swim Club |
| 2022 | Lewis Clareburt | Swimming Wellington | Capital Swim Club |
| 2023 | Erika Fairweather | Swimming Otago | Neptune |

== Stakeholders and affiliations ==
Swimming New Zealand's key stakeholders include:

- Swimming Northland
- Swimming Auckland
- Swimming Waikato
- Swimming Bay of Plenty
- Swimming Taranaki
- Swimming Hawkes Bay Poverty Bay
- Swimming Manawatu
- Swimming Wellington
- Swimming Nelson Marlborough
- Swimming Canterbury West Coast
- Swimming Otago
- Swimming Southland
- New Zealand Swim Coaches and Teachers Association (NZSCTA)

== See also ==
- List of New Zealand records in swimming
