= Athletics at the 1974 British Commonwealth Games – Men's decathlon =

Men's decathlon at the 1974 British Commonwealth Games
- Venue: Queen Elizabeth II Park
- Dates: 26 and 27 January

Medalists
gold medal	Mike Bull	Northern Ireland
silver medal	Barry King	England
bronze medal	Rob Lethbridge	Australia

The men's decathlon event at the 1974 British Commonwealth Games was held on 26 and 27 January at the Queen Elizabeth II Park in Christchurch, New Zealand.

Future Fijian Prime Minister Sitiveni Rabuka competed in this event.

== Results ==
† The highest mark recorded in each event is highlighted in yellow and marked with a dagger, †. Mike Bull, the gold medallist, won the pole vault, placed second in the 100 metres and tenth in the javelin throw.

Final results
Rank	Athlete	Nationality	100m	LJ	SP	HJ	400m	110m H	DT	PV	JT	1500m	Points	Notes
1st place, gold medalist(s)	Mike Bull	Northern Ireland	11.16	7.01	13.65	1.88	49.8	15.30	38.86	5.00†	43.54	4:46.9	7417	
2nd place, silver medalist(s)	Barry King	England	11.58	6.78	15.28†	1.88	50.?	16.73	45.02†	3.80	59.02	4:37.7	7277	
3rd place, bronze medalist(s)	Rob Lethbridge	Australia	11.28	7.18	11.28	1.91	48.62	15.85	36.28	3.40	69.22†	4:30.4†	7270	
4	David Kidner	Western Samoa	11.57	7.09	12.93	1.97†	52.?	15.30	40.96	4.30	55.30	5:07.5	7188	
5	Sanitesi Latu	Tonga	11.34	7.00	13.34	1.91	50.?	14.77†	39.44	3.60	56.78	5:04.4	7140	
6	Iafeta Sua'Mene	New Zealand	11.2	6.81	14.21	1.85	50.?	15.78	39.82	3.30	57.64	4:56.2	6993	
7	Roger Main	New Zealand	11.27	6.78	13.9	1.76	50.?	15.15	38.76	3.70	47.96	5:21.7	6799	
8	Terry Beaton	Australia	11.50	6.51	12.00	1.91	51.08	15.74	41.32	3.20	55.54	4:50.02	6780	
9	Geoffrey Wood	New Zealand	11.79	6.24	13.31	1.73	51.1	16.19	39.86	3.20	52.10	4:31.1	6622	
10	Viliame Tunidau	Fiji	12.35	5.76	10.26	?.??	55.3	17.09	30.50	3.00	56.78	4:59.4	5471	
11	Sitiveni Rabuka	Fiji	12.1	5.97	14.47	1.65	56.6	19.48	33.52	2.70	43.06	5:13.8	5332	
	Stewart McCallum	Scotland	11.13†	7.73†	11.82	1.88	48.3†	15.06	33.06	NM	DNS	–	DNF	
	Raymond Knox	Northern Ireland	11.64	5.65	DNS	–	–	–	–	–	–	–	DNF	

=== Abbreviations in table headings ===
In the order they appear:

- LJ – Long jump
- SP – Shot put
- HJ – High jump
- H – Hurdles
- DT – Discus throw
- PV – Pole vault
- JT – Javelin throw
