= Athletics at the 1974 British Commonwealth Games – Men's pole vault =

Men's pole vault at the 1974 British Commonwealth Games
- Venue: Queen Elizabeth II Park
- Dates: 31 January

Medalists
gold medal	Don Baird	Australia
silver medal	Mike Bull	Northern Ireland
bronze medal	Brian Hooper	England

The men's pole vault event at the 1974 British Commonwealth Games was held on 31 January at the Queen Elizabeth II Park in Christchurch, New Zealand.

== Results ==
Final result
Rank	Name	Nationality	Height	Notes
1st place, gold medalist(s)	Don Baird	Australia	5.05	
2nd place, silver medalist(s)	Mike Bull	Northern Ireland	5.00	
3rd place, bronze medalist(s)	Brian Hooper	England	5.00	
4	Ray Boyd	Australia	4.80	
5	Peter Tracy	New Zealand	4.60	
	David Lease	Wales	NM	
