= Brad Cooper (swimmer) =

Australian swimmer (born 1954)

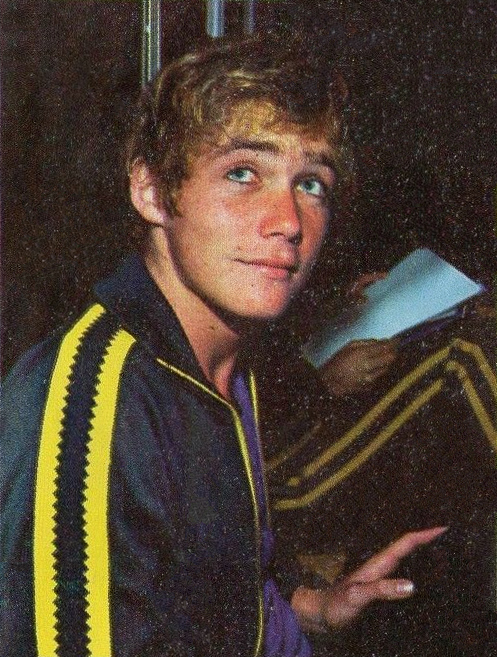
- Cooper in 1972

Personal information
- Full name: Bradford Paul Cooper
- National team: Australia
- Born: 19 July 1954 (age 71) Singapore
- Height: 1.60 m (5 ft 3 in)
- Weight: 72 kg (159 lb)

Sport
- Sport: Swimming
- Strokes: Freestyle, backstroke
Medal record
Men's swimming
Representing Australia
Summer Olympics
Gold medal – first place	1972 Munich	400 m freestyle
World Championships (LC)
Silver medal – second place	1973 Belgrade	400 m freestyle
Silver medal – second place	1973 Belgrade	4×200 m freestyle
Bronze medal – third place	1973 Belgrade	1500 m freestyle
British Commonwealth Games
Gold medal – first place	1974 Christchurch	200 m backstroke
Silver medal – second place	1974 Christchurch	400 m freestyle
Bronze medal – third place	1974 Christchurch	100 m backstroke

Bradford Paul Cooper (born 19 July 1954) is an Australian former freestyle and backstroke swimmer of the 1970s, who won a gold medal in the 400 m freestyle at the 1972 Summer Olympics. In that race he originally finished second by the smallest margin ever to decide an Olympic swimming final (one hundredth of a second), but was later awarded the gold medal after the victor, American Rick DeMont, an asthmatic, was disqualified after his post-race urinalysis tested positive for traces of the banned substance ephedrine contained in his prescription asthma medication, Marax.

The second of three brothers, Cooper was born in Singapore to Australian parents but moved with his family to Rockhampton, Queensland at the age of five. There, his father was the manager of a cinema centre and the family also water skied on weekends. The Cooper brothers all learned to swim early and joined the Rockhampton Swimming Club, but it was Brad who shone from the start, winning his first Central Queensland medals at age seven. After his parents divorced when he was twelve, Cooper lived with his father while his brothers stayed with their mother. For the next three years his father entered an unsettled phase, during which time he and Brad lived in a dozen men's boarding houses and hostels in Brisbane and Sydney. This disrupted his education and coaching: he would attend fifteen schools and train under ten coaches, briefly including John Konrads, himself a prolific world-record breaking swimmer and Olympic gold medallist. In 1970, at age 15, at the national open championships, Cooper came second in both the 100 m and 200 m backstroke, putting him briefly in contention for that year's Commonwealth Games team.

Cooper then moved to Sydney, where he trained with Don Talbot. This paid dividends at the 1971 Australian Championships, when he won both the 100 m and 200 m backstroke, the latter in an Australian record time. He also came second in the 400 m freestyle behind fellow Talbot swimmer Graham Windeatt, surpassing the previous Australian record. This earned Cooper selection for a national team to tour Europe for competitive experience.

In January 1972, Cooper hit the headlines when he broke the 800 m freestyle world record. Within a month, at the Australian Championships in Brisbane, he won the 400 m and 1500 m freestyle events and the 100 m and 200 m backstroke, showing versatility over a large range of distances. This included a world record in the 400 m freestyle, while his 1500 m freestyle time was only 0.6s outside the world record. He went to Munich as one of the favourites in both the 400 m and 1500 m freestyle events.

In the 400 m event, Cooper contested the race with DeMont and West Germany's Werner Lampe who attacked immediately. In the end Lampe faded, and DeMont touched just 0.01s ahead of Cooper. Both then easily qualified for the 1500 m freestyle final, but news came through afterwards that DeMont had been disqualified from the 400 m and barred from starting in the 1500 m final, due to a positive test for ephedrine after American officials had forgotten to register his asthma drug Marax. The International Olympic Committee initially decided to leave the gold medal vacant, until a protest from the Australian delegation resulted in Cooper being awarded the gold medal.

The controversy appeared to affect Cooper in the 1500 m freestyle final. He finished seventh, twenty seconds slower than his time in the heats, and more than half a minute slower than his personal best. His performance in the 200 m backstroke placed him fourth, after lowering his personal best by three seconds, although it was two seconds slower than the bronze medal winner. He also placed fifth in the 4 × 200 m freestyle relay with Windeatt, Michael Wenden and Robert Nay.

After the Olympics, Talbot left to become a coach in Canada, forcing Cooper to return to Brisbane to train with Harry Gallagher. In 1973, he was the Australian Champion in the 200 m, 400 m and 800 m freestyle, and the 100 m and 200 m backstroke. However, he continued to switch coaches throughout the year, also training with Allan Wood and Tony Fraser. He went on to compete at the 1973 World Aquatics Championships in Belgrade, where media interest surrounded his 400 m and 1500 m freestyle races against DeMont. In the 400 m, both broke the world record and broke the four-minute barrier for the first time, with DeMont finishing ahead of Cooper. Cooper also finished behind DeMont in the 1500 m, but the race was won by Australian Stephen Holland, who broke his own world record. Cooper also won a silver medal as part of the 4 × 200 m freestyle relay. Cooper was then awarded a swimming scholarship to Miami University, but was unable to enrol as he had not finished his secondary education in Australia.

At the 1974 Commonwealth Games in Christchurch, he was upset in the 100 m backstroke by fellow Australian Mark Tonelli and finished third, but set a new Australian record in the 200 m backstroke to win gold. In the freestyle events, he managed a silver in the 400 m, three seconds outside his best, and finished last in the 1500 m freestyle, one minute slower than his best. He then won the 400 m freestyle and 200 m backstroke at the Australian Championships, and then retired, saying that "I was sick of the daily grind".

Cooper later worked in periods in the newspaper industry as a journalist, as well as becoming a swimming coach and building his own swim centre.

He was inducted into the Sport Australia Hall of Fame in 1990, and the International Swimming Hall of Fame in 1994. He received an Australian Sports Medal in 2000.

In 2009 Cooper was inducted into the Queensland Sport Hall of Fame.

Cooper's memoir, The Finest Gold: The Making of an Olympic Swimmer, was published by Scribe in 2018.

== See also ==
- List of members of the International Swimming Hall of Fame
- List of Commonwealth Games medallists in swimming (men)
- List of Olympic medalists in swimming (men)
- World record progression 400 metres freestyle
- World record progression 800 metres freestyle
