= Peter Watson (cyclist) =

Retired cyclist

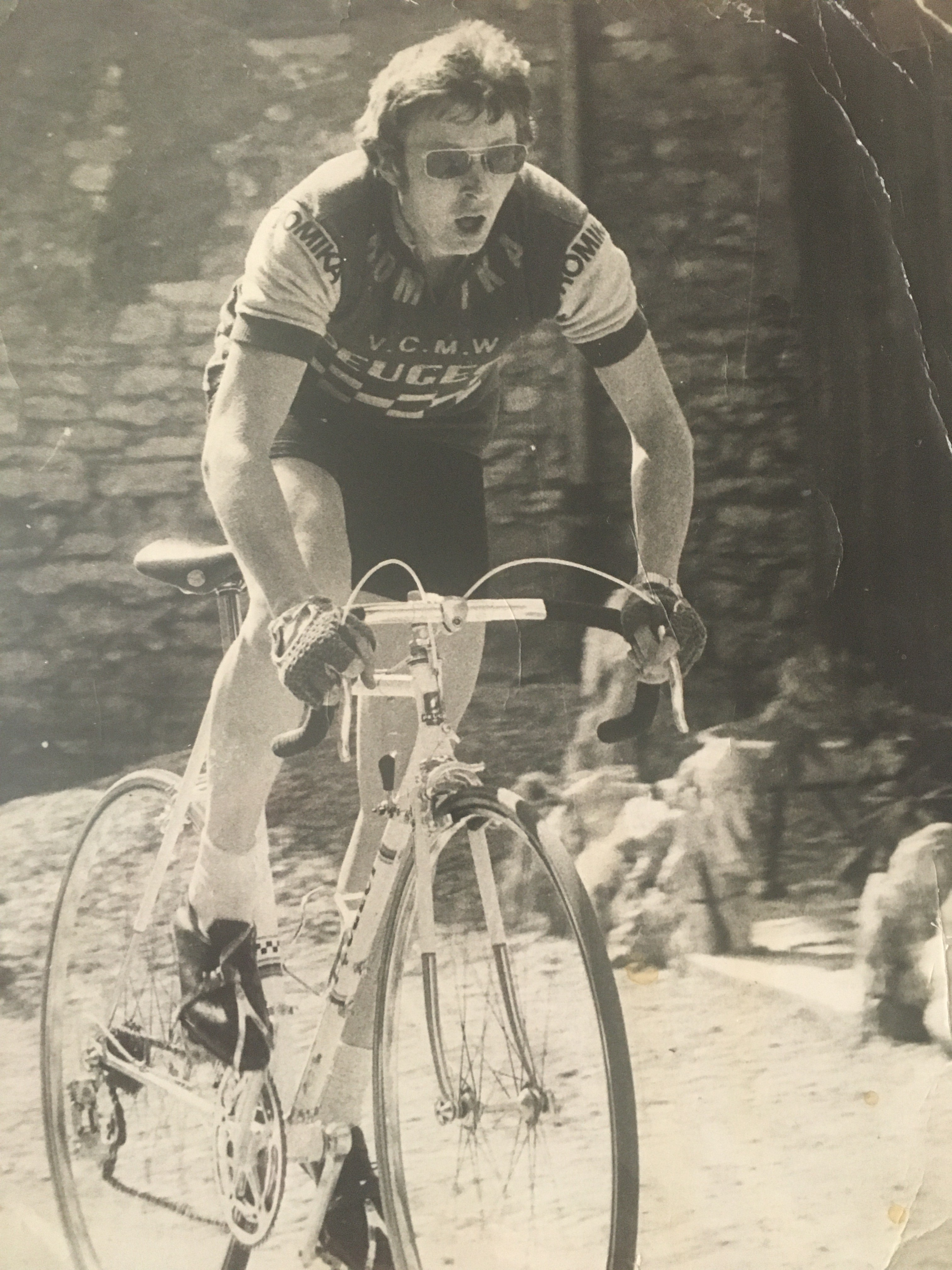

Peter Watson (born 1950), is a male retired cyclist who competed for England.

== Cycling career ==
Watson won the King of the Mountains in the 1973 Tour of Britain and recorded 19 career victories from 1968-1982.

He represented England in the road race, at the 1974 British Commonwealth Games in Christchurch, New Zealand.
