= Holly Lodge High School =

Coordinates: 52.49818°N 1.98831°W

Holly Lodge High School College of Science
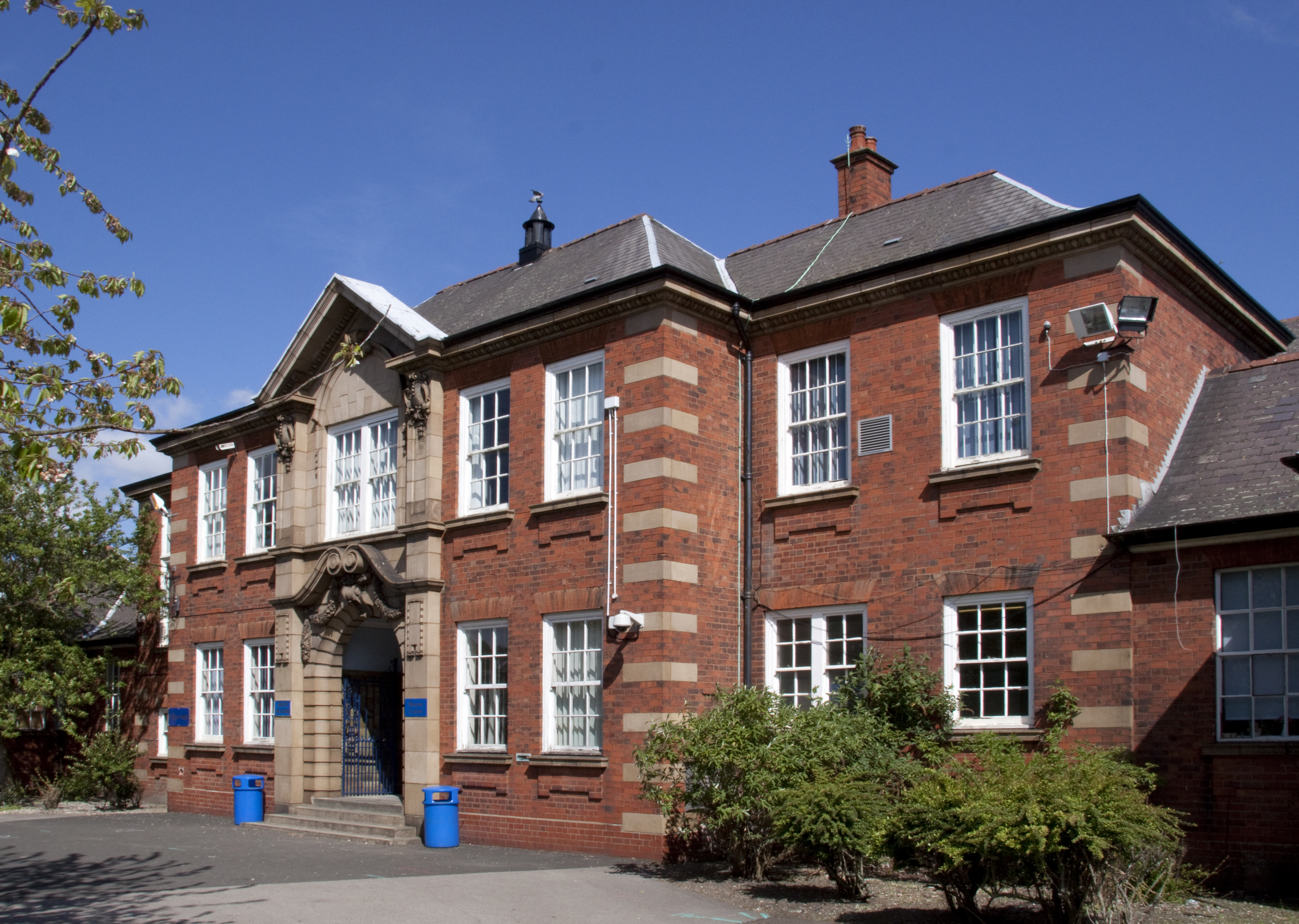

Location
- Holly Lane; Smethwick, West Midlands; England

Information
- Type: Foundation school
- Established: 1922 as Holly Lodge, a grammar-type secondary school for girls; 1992 as Holly Lodge High School
- Local authority: Sandwell
- Specialist: Science
- Department for Education URN: 104018 Tables
- Ofsted: Reports
- Head teacher: I Iqbal
- Age: 11 to 18
- Enrolment: 1326
- Website: holly-lodge.org

Holly Lodge High School College of Science is a secondary school in Smethwick, West Midlands, England.

== Admissions ==
It is located on Holly Lane on the middle point between Smethwick and Oldbury, near West Smethwick Park and West Park Road less than a mile from the M5. There are also entrances on Marshall Street and Forster Street. The school has a large percentage (65%) of pupils from Sikh, Hindu and Islamic communities. 23% of the school population are white.

The school was expanded in September 1992 when it took in the pupils of Smethwick Hall Boys School, which had closed at the end of the school year that July.

The headteacher is Mr I Iqbal. Between September 2009 and August 2011, refurbishment of existing facilities and the construction of new buildings occurred on the site as part of the Building Schools for the Future programme. A total of £23 million was spent on improving the facilities.

== History ==
It was originally a girls' and boys' grammar school. The girls' grammar school at Holly Lodge, formerly the home of the Downing family, opened in 1922, moving to a new building in 1927. The boys' grammar school opened in Holly Lodge, moving to a new building opposite the girls' school in 1932. In 1940, the school was evacuated to avoid possible bombing. It settled in Newport, Shropshire, sharing Adams Grammar School: AGS in the mornings and Holly Lodge in the afternoons.

In 1967, the boys' school merged with James Watt Technical School (a boys' school) on Crockett's Lane. The girls' and boys' schools were united in 1974 as a high school admitting children of all abilities on the two original sites. A Science and Technology block was built in 1970 prior to the amalgamation of the boys' and girls' schools. For a number of years, a co-educational high school was run on the premises that had once been the girls' grammar school, while the former boys' grammar school premises housed West Park Sixth Form College, which closed in 1992. In September 1992, the modern Holly Lodge officially began when three schools in West Smethwick merged. The school was rebuilt following the Building Schools for the Future programme.

Holly Lodge became a specialist College of Science in the summer of 2004.

== Academic performance ==
In 2009, 27% of students gained five GCSEs at grades A* – C including English and mathematics. This was, however, a 12% improvement on 2008 results.

In the summer examinations in 2010, 39% of the students gained five A*-C grades including English and mathematics. This rose again in 2011; to 50% gaining 5x A*-C grades including English and mathematics.

The school had another Ofsted inspection in May 2013. Each category was judged as 'good' with exemplary practice in developing literacy. The school has therefore moved from National Challenge to a good school in four years.

== Notable alumni ==
- Robin Corbett, Baron Corbett of Castle Vale (1933–2012), Labour MP for Hemel Hempstead from 1974–9, and Birmingham Erdington from 1983 to 2001
- Julian Dawes, musician, composer
- Gregory Evans, dramatist
- Dame Julie Walters, DBE actress and author
- Avis Willington, 1970s Olympic swimmer
