= Neil Dexter (swimmer) =

British swimmer

Personal information
- Born: 29 April 1955 (age 71)

Sport
- Sport: Swimming
Medal record
Men's swimming
Representing England
Commonwealth Games
Silver medal – second place	1974 Christchurch	4×200 m freestyle

Neil Dexter (born 29 April 1955) is a British former swimmer.

== Swimming career ==
He competed in two events at the 1972 Summer Olympics.

He represented England and won a silver medal in the 4 x 100 metres freestyle relay, at the 1974 British Commonwealth Games in Christchurch, New Zealand.
