= Des Gwilliam =

Boxer who competed for England

Personal information
- Nationality: England
- Born: 8 April 1954 Birmingham
- Died: 1999 (aged 44) Canary Islands

Desmond M Gwilliam (1954–1999), was a male boxer who competed for England.

== Boxing career ==
Gwilliam won two national boys' club championships before winning the gold medal in the Dutch Multi-Nations tournament. He was then selected for England and represented England in the lightweight (-60 Kg) division, at the 1974 British Commonwealth Games in Christchurch, New Zealand. He was also a quarter-finalist in the European Championships in 1975.

He turned professional on 25 February 1977 and fought in 24 fights until 1983.
