= Athletics at the 1974 British Commonwealth Games – Men's high jump =

Men's high jump at the 1974 British Commonwealth Games
- Venue: Queen Elizabeth II Park
- Dates: 29 January

Medalists
gold medal	Gordon Windeyer	Australia
silver medal	Lawrie Peckham	Australia
bronze medal	Claude Ferragne	Canada

The men's high jump event at the 1974 British Commonwealth Games was held on 29 January at the Queen Elizabeth II Park in Christchurch, New Zealand.

== Results ==
Final result
Rank	Name	Nationality	Height	Notes
1st place, gold medalist(s)	Gordon Windeyer	Australia	2.16	GR
2nd place, silver medalist(s)	Lawrie Peckham	Australia	2.14	
3rd place, bronze medalist(s)	Claude Ferragne	Canada	2.12	
4	John Beers	Canada	2.10	
5	John Hawkins	Canada	2.10	
6	Noor Azhar Abdul Hamid	Singapore	2.08	
7	Sheikh Tidiane Faye	Gambia	2.05	
8	Lanyumi Sumuni	Tanzania	1.95	
9	Clark Godwin	Bermuda	1.95	
	Kingsley Adams	Ghana	DNS	
