= Keith Walton =

British swimmer

Personal information
- Born: 1953 (age 72–73) Durham

Sport
- Sport: Swimming
Medal record
Men's swimming
Representing England
Commonwealth Games
Bronze medal – third place	1974 Christchurch	4×100 m freestyle

Keith Walton (born 1953) is a male British former swimmer.

== Swimming career ==
Walton represented England and won a bronze medal in the 4 x 100 freestyle relay event, at the 1974 British Commonwealth Games in Christchurch, New Zealand. He also participated in the 100 metres freestyle and swam for the Belle Vue Swimming Club in Consett.
