= Stephen Nash (swimmer) =

British swimmer

Personal information
- Born: 1956 (age 69–70)

Sport
- Sport: Swimming
Medal record
Men's swimming
Representing Great Britain
European Championships
Silver medal – second place	1974 Vienna	4×100 m medley
Representing England
Commonwealth Games
Bronze medal – third place	1974 Christchurch	4×100 m medley

Stephen Nash (born 1956) is a male retired British international butterfly swimmer.

== Swimming career ==
Nash was part of the 1974 England team, where he won a bronze medal for the 4×100 m medley relay at the 1974 Commonwealth Games in Christchurch, New Zealand. He also won a silver medal for the same event for Great Britain at the 1974 European Swimming Championships in Vienna, Austria. He won 100 m butterfly event at the 6 nations tournament in Minsk, USSR in 1976.

== See also ==
- List of Commonwealth Games medallists in swimming (men)
