= Alan Winterbourne =

British weightlifter

Personal information
- Nationality: English
- Born: 1 April 1947 (age 79) Oxford, Oxfordshire

Alan Winterbourne (born 1947), is a male former weightlifter who competed for Great Britain and England.

== Weightlifting career ==
Winterbourne represented Great Britain in the 1976 Summer Olympics and the 1980 Summer Olympics.

He represented England in the 60 kg featherweight division, at the 1974 British Commonwealth Games in Christchurch, New Zealand. Four years later he represented England in the 67.5 kg lightweight division, at the 1978 Commonwealth Games in Edmonton, Alberta, Canada. He made a third and final appearance for England at the 1982 Commonwealth Games in Brisbane, Queensland, Australia, once again in the 67.5 kg lightweight division.
