= Jaynie Parkhouse =

New Zealand swimmer

Jaynie Hudgell
Personal information
- Nationality: New Zealand
- Born: Jaynie Margaret Parkhouse; 17 April 1956 (age 70) Cambridge, New Zealand
- Height: 1.69 m (5 ft 7 in)

Sport
- Sport: Swimming
- Strokes: Freestyle
- Club: Wharenui Swimming Club
- Coach: Pic Parkhouse
Medal record
Women's swimming
Commonwealth Games
Gold medal – first place	1974 Christchurch	800 m freestyle
Bronze medal – third place	1974 Christchurch	400 m freestyle

Jaynie Margaret Hudgell (née Parkhouse, born 17 April 1956) is a retired female freestyle swimmer from New Zealand, who competed for her native country at the 1972 Summer Olympics in Munich, West Germany. She claimed the gold medal at the 1974 British Commonwealth Games in Christchurch, New Zealand, in the women's 800 m freestyle and bronze medal in the 400 m freestyle.

Born in Cambridge, Hudgell grew up in Christchurch where she attended Villa Maria College and raced for the Wharenui Swimming Club under her father Vincent Temple (Pic) Parkhouse.

Jaynie Parkhouse Drive, within Queen Elizabeth II Park, where she won her gold and bronze medals, was named after her. Parkhouse Reserve and Parkhouse Street in Rangiora are also named after her.

From 2021 to 2024 she was president of Swimming New Zealand.

== Swimming career ==
At 16, Hudgell competed at the 1972 Summer Olympics in Munich, in the 400 metre freestyle finishing 5th in heat 4 in a time of 4:40.24, and in the 800 metre freestyle where she finished 3rd in heat 5 in a time of 9:34.65.

At the 1974 Commonwealth Games in front of a home crowd, Hudgell won the 800 metre freestyle ahead of Australian trio Rosemary Milgate, Sally Lockyer and world record holder Jenny Turrall in a time of 8:58.49. Hudgell would go on to claim the bronze medal in the 400 metre freestyle in a time of 4:23.09, only one second behind Turrall. She would wrap up her performance with 5th place finishes in the 100 metre freestyle, 200 metre freestyle, 4x100 metre freestyle relay and 4x100 metre mixed relay.

Hudgell retired from swimming that year.
