= Andrew Hunter (Irish swimmer) =

Irish swimmer

Personal information
- Born: 10 December 1952 (age 73)

Sport
- Sport: Swimming
- Strokes: Frontcrawl

Andrew Hunter (born 10 December 1952) is an Irish former swimmer. He attended Campbell College in Belfast and represented Northern Ireland at the Commonwealth Games.

The holder of a number of regional records, including "Irish sprint champion", Hunter represented Ireland in the men's 100 metre freestyle at the 1972 Summer Olympics in Munich. He did not qualify for the 1976 Olympics.

His son, also named Andrew Hunter, won the Ulster freestyle swimming championships on several occasions.
