= Christine Gaskell =

British swimmer (born 1957)

Personal information
- Born: 1957 (age 68–69) Heywood, Greater Manchester

Sport
- Sport: Swimming
Medal record
Women's swimming
Representing England
Commonwealth Games
Gold medal – first place	1974 Christchurch	100 m breaststroke

Christine Gaskell (born 1957) is a female British former swimmer.

== Swimming career ==
Gaskell represented England and won a gold medal in the 100 breaststroke event, at the 1974 British Commonwealth Games in Christchurch, New Zealand. She also participated in the 200 metres breaststroke and medley relay.

She swam for the Rochdale Swimming Club and first gained international selection in 1972.
