= Mark Treffers =

New Zealand swimmer

Personal information
- Full name: Mark Ferdinand Treffers
- Born: 16 December 1953 (age 72) Invercargill, New Zealand
- Height: 1.83 m (6 ft 0 in)
- Relatives: Ben Treffers (son)

Sport
- Sport: Swimming
- Club: Wharenui Swimming Club, Christchurch
Medal record
Representing New Zealand
Men's swimming
British Commonwealth Games
Gold medal – first place	1974 Christchurch	400 m medley
Silver medal – second place	1974 Christchurch	1500 m freestyle
Bronze medal – third place	1970 Edinburgh	1500 m freestyle

Mark Ferdinand Treffers (born 16 December 1953) is a former swimming representative from New Zealand and 1974 Commonwealth Games gold medalist who specialised in long distance freestyle and medley races.

He was born in Invercargill and was taught to swim at the Waverly Swimming Club before moving to Christchurch to train at the Wharenui Swim Club under legendary New Zealand coach Pic Parkhouse.

== Commonwealth Games ==
At the 1970 British Commonwealth Games held in Edinburgh, he won the bronze medal in the 1500 m freestyle in a time of 16:44.69.

At the 1974 British Commonwealth Games held in Christchurch, he won the gold medal in the men's 400m Individual Medley on the same day fellow New Zealander and Wharenui team-mate Jaynie Parkhouse won a gold medal in the 800m Freestyle. Treffers would go on to claim a silver medal in the men's 1500m Freestyle, his main race, as he become just the seventh man in history to break 16 minutes finishing behind Australian Stephen Holland.

== Olympic Games ==
He competed at both the 1972 and 1976 Summer Olympics with his best result being 6th place in the 1500 m at the 1972 Munich Olympic Games.

== British Championship ==
Despite being from New Zealand he won the 'Open' British Championship over 880 yards freestyle and the 1970 1650 yards freestyle title.

== Personal life ==
Treffers studied law at the University of Canterbury while training for the Commonwealth Games before becoming a lawyer in Australia after retiring from swimming.

Mark's son Ben Treffers represented Australia in swimming, winning a gold medal in the 50m Backstroke at the 2014 Glasgow Commonwealth Games.

Mark Treffers Drive in New Brighton and Treffers Road in Wigram are named after him.

== See also ==
- List of Commonwealth Games medallists in swimming (men)
