= Brett Naylor =

New Zealand swimmer

Personal information
- Full name: William Brett Naylor
- Born: 10 March 1957 (age 69) Invercargill, New Zealand

Sport
- Sport: Swimming

William Brett Naylor (born 10 March 1957) is a New Zealand swimmer. He competed in two events at the 1976 Summer Olympics.

In 1990, Naylor was awarded the New Zealand 1990 Commemoration Medal.
