= Colin Cunningham (swimmer) =

English swimmer (born 1954)

Personal information
- Full name: Colin Cunningham
- National team: Great Britain
- Born: 15 September 1954 (age 71)
- Height: 1.80 m (5 ft 11 in)
- Weight: 66 kg (146 lb; 10.4 st)

Sport
- Sport: Swimming
- Strokes: Freestyle, backstroke
- Club: City of Southampton SC
Medal record
Men's swimming
Representing England
Commonwealth Games
Silver medal – second place	1974 Christchurch	4×200 m freestyle
Bronze medal – third place	1974 Christchurch	4×100 m freestyle
Bronze medal – third place	1974 Christchurch	4×100 m medley
Representing Great Britain
European Championships (LC)
Silver medal – second place	1974 Vienna	4×100 m medley

Colin Cunningham (born 15 September 1954) is an English former freestyle and backstroke swimmer.

== Swimming career ==
He represented Great Britain at the 1972 Summer Olympics. There he competed in the individual 100-metre and 200-metre backstroke. Cunningham was also a member of the relay teams in the 4×200-metre freestyle and 4×100-metre medley.

He represented England and won a silver medal in the 4 x 200 metres freestyle relay, a bronze medal in the 4 x 100 metres freestyle relay and another bronze medal in the 4 x 100 metres medley relay, at the 1974 British Commonwealth Games in Christchurch, New Zealand.

At the ASA National British Championships he won the 100 metres backstroke title twice (1972, 1973) and the 200 metres backstroke title twice (1972, 1973).

== Coaching ==
Colin Cunningham was a swimming coach for Rotherham Metro ASC and was the clubs chief coach until 2005 when the council didn't want to support the swimming club. The club then decided to run it on their own through volunteers and now a new chief coach is in charge.

Colin has been Head Coach of Sheffield City Swimming Club since January 2010.

== See also ==
- City of Southampton Swimming Club
- List of Commonwealth Games medallists in swimming (men)
