= Brenda Holmes =

Canadian swimmer

Personal information
- Born: 27 April 1958 (age 68) Edmonton, Alberta, Canada

Sport
- Sport: Swimming

Brenda Holmes (born 27 April 1958) is a Canadian former swimmer. She competed in the women's 800 metre freestyle at the 1972 Summer Olympics.
