= Avis Willington =

British swimmer

Personal information
- Born: 12 August 1956 (age 69)

Sport
- Sport: Swimming
Medal record
Women's swimming
Representing England
Commonwealth Games
Bronze medal – third place	1974 Christchurch	4×100 m freestyle

Avis Willington (born 12 August 1956) is a British former swimmer.

== Early life ==
She is from Smethwick. She attended Holly Lodge Grammar School (Holly Lodge High School), taking A levels.

== Career ==
Willington competed in two events at the 1972 Summer Olympics.

She also represented England and won a bronze medal in the 4 x 100 metres freestyle relay event, at the 1974 British Commonwealth Games in Christchurch, New Zealand.
