= Caroline Tamlyn =

British swimmer (born 1955)

Personal information
- Born: 1955 (age 70–71) Bromley Greater London

Sport
- Sport: Swimming

Caroline Tamlyn (born 1955) is a British former swimmer.

== Swimming career ==
Tamlyn won the British Championship over 200 metres breaststroke.

Tamyln represented England in the breaststroke, butterfly and medley events, at the 1974 British Commonwealth Games in Christchurch, New Zealand.

She swam for the Beckenham Ladies Swimming Club and was the 1970 Junior Champion of Kent.
