= Robert Howard (Irish swimmer) =

Irish swimmer

Personal information
- Born: 7 January 1956
- Died: 17 August 2013 (aged 57)

Sport
- Sport: Swimming

Robert Anthony Howard (7 January 1956 – 17 August 2013) was an Irish swimmer. He competed in two events at the 1976 Summer Olympics.
