= Diane Walker =

British swimmer

Personal information
- Nationality: British (Scottish)
- Born: 2 October 1955 (age 70)

Sport
- Sport: Swimming

Diane Walker (born 2 October 1955) is a Scottish former swimmer. Walker competed in two events at the 1972 Summer Olympics. At the ASA National British Championships she won the National Championship 440 yards freestyle title in 1975, the 200 metres medley title in 1973 and the 400 metres medley title in 1972 and 1973.
