= David Leigh (swimmer) =

English swimmer (born 1956)

Medal record

Representing Great Britain

World Championships
Bronze medal – third place	1975 Cali	100 m breaststroke

European Championships (LC)
Bronze medal – third place	1974 Vienna	100 m breaststroke
Bronze medal – third place	1974 Vienna	200 m breaststroke

Representing England

Commonwealth Games
Gold medal – first place	1974 Christchurch	100 m breaststroke
Silver medal – second place	1974 Christchurch	200 m breaststroke
Bronze medal – third place	1974 Christchurch	4×100 m medley

David William Leigh (born 22 December 1956) is an English former competitive swimmer.

== Swimming career ==
Leigh represented Great Britain in the Olympics, FINA world championships and European championships, and England in the Commonwealth Games. He competed in the 1976 Summer Olympics in Montreal, Canada.

Representing England he also competed at the 1974 British Commonwealth Games at Christchurch, New Zealand, where he beat David Wilkie to the gold medal in the 100 metres breaststroke. He also won a silver medal in the 200 metres breaststroke and a bronze medal in the medley relay. At the ASA National British Championships he won the 100 metres breaststroke title in 1975.

== See also ==
- List of Commonwealth Games medallists in swimming (men)
