= Sean Maher (swimmer) =

Welsh swimmer

Personal information
- Full name: Sean Lyndon Maher
- Born: 19 May 1953 (age 73) Newport, Wales
- Height: 179 cm (5 ft 10 in)
- Weight: 69 kg (152 lb)

Sport
- Sport: Swimming
- Strokes: Butterfly

Sean Lyndon Maher (born 19 May 1953) is a Welsh former swimmer. He competed at the 1972 Summer Olympics in the men's 100 metre butterfly and men's 200 metre butterfly events, and the 1976 Summer Olympics in the men's 200 metre butterfly event.
