= Susan Richardson (swimmer) =

English former competitive swimmer

Personal information
- Born: 26 January 1955 (age 71)
- Height: 1.73 m (5 ft 8 in)
- Weight: 66 kg (146 lb)

Sport
- Sport: Swimming
- Club: Beckenham Ladies Swimming Club
Medal record
Women's swimming
Representing Great Britain
European Championships
Bronze medal – third place	1974 Vienna	400 m medley

Susan Jane Richardson (born 26 January 1955) is a female English former competitive swimmer.

== Swimming career ==
Richardson swam for Great Britain in the Olympics and European championships. She won a bronze medal in the 400-metre individual medley at the 1974 European Aquatics Championships; she finished fourth in the 200-metre medley. She competed in these events at the 1972 and 1976 Summer Olympics, but did not reach the finals.

She represented England in the 200 and 400 metres individual medley events, at the 1974 British Commonwealth Games in Christchurch, New Zealand. At the ASA National British Championships she won the 200 metres medley title in 1972.
