= Alyson Jones =

British GP and former swimming champion (born 1956)

Medal record

Women's swimming

Representing England

Commonwealth Games
Bronze medal – third place	1974 Auckland	4×100 m freestyle

Alyson Jones (born 1956) is a British GP and former swimming champion.

== Biography ==
She was born in Middlesbrough in north-east England and attended local schools. She began training as a competitive swimmer at local clubs such as Eston and Hartlepool, winning several titles in the Northumberland and Durham Swimming Association. In 1974, at age 17, she represented England at the 1974 Commonwealth Games in Christchurch, New Zealand, winning a bronze medal in the 4×100 m freestyle relay.

She won the 1985 British Championship in 50 metres freestyle and 100 metres freestyle.

Following this, she ceased competitive swimming to study medicine at the University of Nottingham. Remarkably, in 1985 she returned to competitive swimming at the age of 28, gaining national ranking in freestyle. This was four years before Olympic medallist Sharron Davies also returned to top level competition at the age of 26.

Jones is interested in sports medicine, and has accompanied British teams abroad as team doctor. She currently holds the masters record for the 100 m freestyle, age group 50-54, set in 2007.

Jones is related to other noted sporting figures. She is a great-granddaughter of footballer Walter Tranter, who played for West Ham United in 1900, and a cousin of Leeds United and England footballer Michael O'Grady.

== See also ==
- List of Commonwealth Games medallists in swimming (women)
