= Martin Edwards (swimmer) =

British swimmer

Personal information
- Born: 21 September 1955 (age 70) Birmingham

Sport
- Sport: Swimming

Martin Edwards (born 21 September 1955) is a male British former swimmer. Edwards competed in the men's 100 metre butterfly at the 1972 Summer Olympics.

He also represented England in the 100 and 200 metres butterfly events, at the 1974 British Commonwealth Games in Christchurch, New Zealand. At the ASA National British Championships he won the 100 metres butterfly title in 1973.
