= Anne Adams =

British swimmer

Personal information
- Born: 30 January 1960 (age 66) Bridgend, Wales

Sport
- Sport: Swimming

Anne Wilma Adams (born 30 January 1960) is a female former swimmer who represented Great Britain and Wales.

== Swimming career ==
Adams competed in two events at the 1976 Summer Olympics. She represented Wales at both the 1974 British Commonwealth Games in Christchurch, New Zealand.and the 1978 Commonwealth Games in Edmonton, Alberta, Canada. At the ASA National British Championships she won the 200 metres medley title in 1975 and the 400 metres medley title in 1975. In 1976, she won the 200 meters medley title at the six nations swimming tournament in Minsk.
