= Steve Badger (swimmer) =

Australian-Canadian swimmer

Personal information
- Full name: Stephen William Badger
- Nickname: "Steve"
- National team: Australia; Canada
- Born: 19 October 1956 (age 69) Sydney

Sport
- Sport: Swimming
- Strokes: Freestyle
- Club: Bondi Swim Club, Olympian Swim Club
Medal record
Men's swimming
Representing Australia
World Championships (LC)
Silver medal – second place	1973 Belgrade	4×200 m freestyle
British Commonwealth Games
Gold medal – first place	1974 Christchurch	200 m freestyle
Gold medal – first place	1974 Christchurch	4×200 m freestyle
Bronze medal – third place	1974 Christchurch	400 m freestyle
Bronze medal – third place	1974 Christchurch	1500 m freestyle

Stephen William Badger (born 19 October 1956) is a former competitive swimmer who represented Australia in the 1973 World Swimming Championships and the 1974 Commonwealth Games, and Canada in the 1976 Summer Olympics.

He achieved FINA World Top 20 Rankings from 1973 to 1977 and again in the years 1979–80. He missed selection in the 1978 Canadian Commonwealth Games team due to a bout of glandular fever.

After representing Australia in the 1973 World Championships and the 1974 Commonwealth Games, he moved to Canada in late 1974. He sought selection in the Canadian Olympic Team for the 1976 Games in Montreal. Whilst competing at the Canadian Olympic Trials Stephen was placed under police protection due to death threats.

In 1977 Badger broke the short course world record for the 400-metre freestyle. After suffering glandular fever in 1978, he returned to international competition, touring Europe in early 1980 with the Canadian national swimming team. He retired the day after the Canadian Olympic Federation announced their boycott of the 1980 Summer Olympics in Moscow.

He returned to Sydney, Australia in 1981 and began his career in swimming coaching. He resides in Sydney with his wife and three children.

== See also ==
- List of Commonwealth Games medallists in swimming (men)
- List of World Aquatics Championships medalists in swimming (men)
