= Neil Rogers (swimmer) =

Australian swimmer (1953–2024)

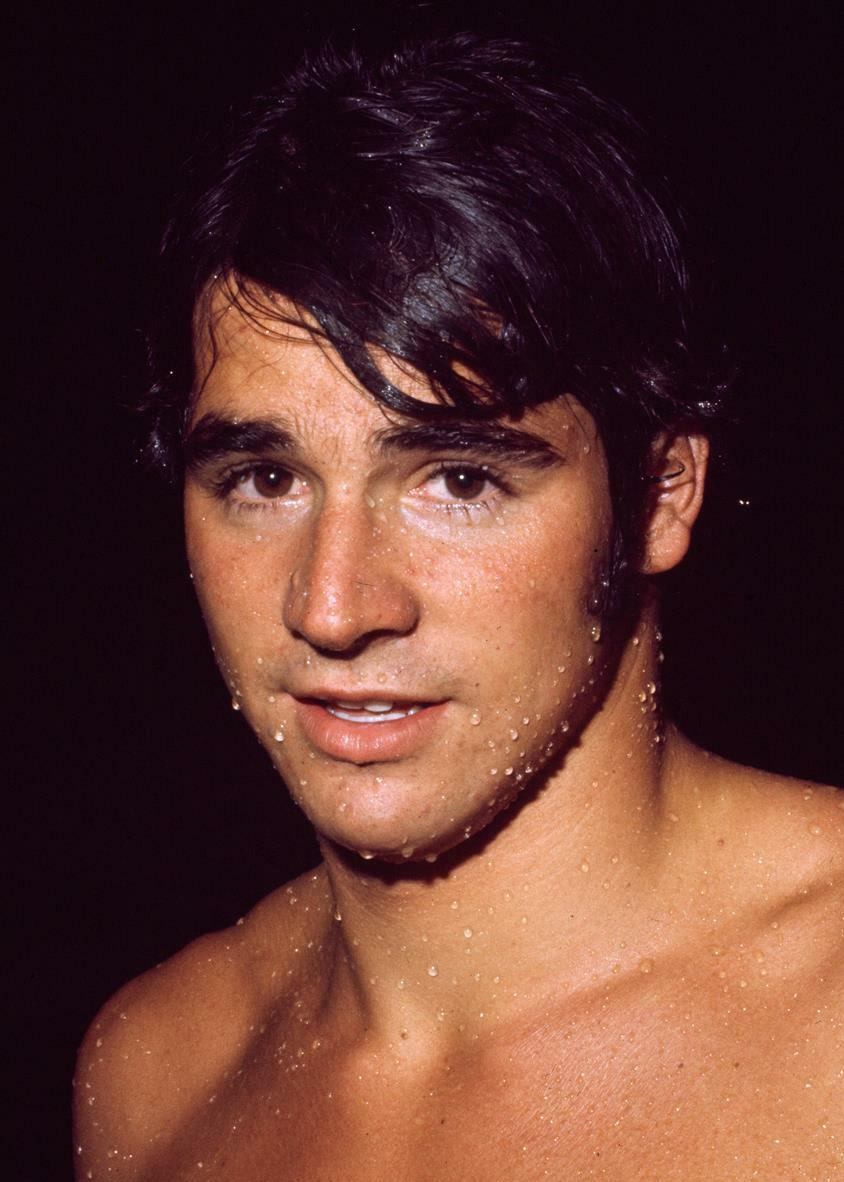
- Rogers in 1972

Personal information
- Full name: Neil Williams Rogers
- National team: Australia
- Born: 22 June 1953
- Died: 16 April 2024 (aged 70)
- Height: 1.83 m (6 ft 0 in)
- Weight: 87 kg (192 lb)

Sport
- Sport: Swimming
- Strokes: Backstroke, Butterfly, freestyle
Medal record
Men's swimming
Representing Australia
Commonwealth Games
Silver medal – second place	1970 Edinburgh	4x100m medley relay
Bronze medal – third place	1970 Edinburgh	200m backstroke
Gold medal – first place	1974 Christchurch	100m butterfly
Silver medal – second place	1974 Christchurch	4x100m freestyle relay
Silver medal – second place	1974 Christchurch	4x100m medley relay

Neil William Rogers (22 June 1953 – 16 April 2024) was an Australian swimmer who competed in the 1972 Summer Olympics and 1976 Summer Olympics.

He had two brothers - Greg, a two-time Olympian in 1968 Mexico, where he won a silver and bronze medal, & 1972 Munich, and Ron, the Australian open belt champion.

He died on 16 April 2024, aged 70.

== See also ==
- List of Commonwealth Games medallists in swimming (men)
