= Judy Wright =

Canadian swimmer

Personal information
- Nationality: Canadian
- Born: 9 January 1956 (age 70) Vancouver, British Columbia, Canada

Sport
- Sport: Swimming
- Strokes: Freestyle
Medal record
Women's swimming
Representing Canada
British Commonwealth Games
| Gold medal – first place | 1974 Christchurch | 4×100 m freestyle |
| Bronze medal – third place | 1974 Christchurch | 100 m freestyle |

Judy Wright (born 9 January 1956) is a Canadian former swimmer. Wright competed in two events at the 1972 Summer Olympics.
