= Peter Coughlan =

Australian swimmer (born 1947)

Personal information
- Born: 8 April 1957 (age 69)

Sport
- Sport: Swimming
- Strokes: freestyle
Medal record
Men's swimming
Representing Australia
Commonwealth Games
Silver medal – second place	1974 Christchurch	4×100 m freestyle

Peter Coughlan (born 8 April 1957) is an Australian former swimmer. He competed in three events at the 1976 Summer Olympics.
