= Patti Stenhouse =

Canadian swimmer

Personal information
- Nationality: Canadian
- Born: 24 September 1955 (age 70)

Sport
- Sport: Swimming
- Event: Butterfly
- Club: North Vancouver SC; Ridge SC (Surrey)
Medal record
Representing Canada
British Commonwealth Games
Gold medal – first place	1974 Christchurch	100 m butterfly
Gold medal – first place	1974 Christchurch	4×100 medley
Silver medal – second place	1974 Christchurch	200 m butterfly

Patti Stenhouse (born 24 September 1955) is a Canadian former swimmer who was Commonwealth champion in the 100 metre butterfly.

Stenhouse, a butterfly specialist, swam for the Ridge SC in Surrey, British Columbia, which was formed by her father Jim to train his three children. She is the elder sister of swimmer Janice Stenhouse, with whom she competed at the 1973 World Aquatics Championships in Belgrade.

At the 1974 British Commonwealth Games, held in Christchurch, Stenhouse won three medals for Canada, including gold in both the 100 metre butterfly and 4x100 medley relay. She set a national record in the 200m butterfly to finish with a silver medal.
