= Pat Beavan =

British swimmer

Personal information
- Full name: Patricia Catherine Beavan
- Born: 27 May 1951 (age 75)

Sport
- Sport: Swimming
- Strokes: Breaststroke
Medal record
Women's swimming
Representing Wales
British Commonwealth Games
Gold medal – first place	1974 Christchurch	200 m breaststroke

Patricia Catherine Beavan (born 27 May 1951) is a British former swimmer. She competed in the women's 200 metre breaststroke at the 1972 Summer Olympics.
