= Allison Smith (swimmer) =

Australian swimmer (born 1960)

Personal information
- Born: 18 March 1960 (age 66)

Sport
- Sport: Swimming
Medal record
Women's swimming
Representing Australia
British Commonwealth Games
Bronze medal – third place	1974 Christchurch	200 m breaststroke

Allison Glen Smith (born 18 March 1960) is an Australian former swimmer. She competed in three events at the 1976 Summer Olympics.
