= Susan Hunter (swimmer) =

New Zealand swimmer (born 1955)

Personal information
- Nationality: New Zealand
- Born: 5 October 1955 (age 71) Christchurch, New Zealand

Sport
- Sport: Swimming
Medal record
Women's swimming
Representing New Zealand
British Commonwealth Games
| Bronze medal – third place | 1974 Christchurch | 200 m medley |
| Bronze medal – third place | 1974 Christchurch | 400 m medley |

Susan Jane Hunter (born 5 October 1955) is a New Zealand swimmer. She competed at the 1972 Summer Olympics and the 1976 Summer Olympics.
