= Jennifer Turrall =

Australian swimmer

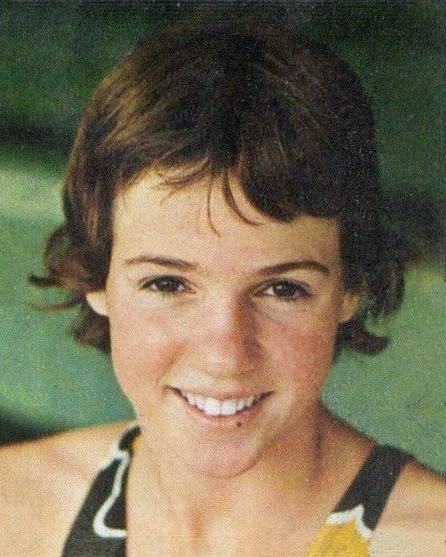
- Turrall c. 1974

Personal information
- Full name: Jennifer Lynnette Turrall
- Nickname: "Jenny"
- National team: Australia
- Born: 9 May 1960 (age 66)
- Height: 1.66 m (5 ft 5 in)
- Weight: 64 kg (141 lb)

Sport
- Sport: Swimming
- Strokes: Freestyle
Medal record
Representing Australia
World Championships
Gold medal – first place	1975 Cali	800 m freestyle
Silver medal – second place	1975 Cali	400 m freestyle
British Commonwealth Games
Gold medal – first place	1974 Christchurch	400 m freestyle
Silver medal – second place	1974 Christchurch	200 m freestyle
Silver medal – second place	1974 Christchurch	800 m freestyle
Silver medal – second place	1974 Christchurch	4x100 m freestyle

Jennifer Lynette "Jenny" Turrall (later Wetton, born 9 May 1960) is an Australian former competitive swimmer who won two medals in the 400-metre and 800-metre freestyle at the 1975 World Aquatics Championships. She competed in the same events at the 1976 Summer Olympics, with the best achievement of eighth place in the 800-metre freestyle. She is also the former world record holder. In 1993 she was inducted to the Sport Australia Hall of Fame.

== Swimming career ==
She was not yet 14 when she won three medals, one gold and two silver, at the 1974 British Commonwealth Games in Christchurch, New Zealand, and set a world record (8:50.1) in the 800-metre freestyle on 5 January 1974 at the New South Wales state championships in Sydney. She set another world record in the same event in 1975. Between 1973 and 1975 she also set and then four times improved her world record in the 1500-metre freestyle.

== Post-swimming career ==
She retired from swimming in 1976 due to injuries. After finishing school she worked at a TV station in Sydney, but then changed to healthcare and in 1982 received a nursing degree from the Concord Hospital in Sydney.

== Personal life ==
Later she married, and changed her last name to Wetton.

== See also ==
- List of World Aquatics Championships medalists in swimming (women)
- List of Commonwealth Games medallists in swimming (women)
- World record progression 800 metres freestyle
- World record progression 1500 metres freestyle
