= Robert Nay =

Australian swimmer

Personal information
- Full name: Robert John Nay
- National team: Australia
- Born: 15 November 1956
- Died: 7 November 1992 (aged 35) Labrador, Queensland
- Height: 1.77 m (5 ft 10 in)
- Weight: 70 kg (150 lb)

Sport
- Sport: Swimming
- Strokes: Freestyle
Medal record
Representing Australia
Commonwealth Games
Gold medal – first place	1974 Christchurch	4x200 m freestyle

Robert John Nay (15 November 1956 – 7 November 1992) was a competitive swimmer from Australia. Nay competed in the 1972 Summer Olympics in Munich, Germany, but failed to reach the finals. His daughter Meagen Nay competed for Australia at the 2008 Summer Olympics in Beijing, coming seventh in the 200-metre backstroke.

He was killed in a car accident.

== See also ==
- List of Commonwealth Games medallists in swimming (men)
