= Sandra Yost =

Australian swimmer

Personal information
- Nationality: Australia

Sport
- Sport: Swimming
- Strokes: Butterfly, freestyle, backstroke
Medal record
Women's swimming
Representing Australia
British Commonwealth Games
Gold medal – first place	1974 Christchurch	200 m butterfly
Silver medal – second place	1974 Christchurch	200 m backstroke
Bronze medal – third place	1974 Christchurch	100 m butterfly

Sandra Yost is an Australian former competitive swimmer. She won various medals at the 1974 Commonwealth Games including Gold 200m Butterfly, Silver 200m Backstroke, Bronze 100m Butterfly.

== Career ==
She competed at the 1973 World Aquatics Championships where she came 8th in the 800 metre freestyle and 6th in 200 metre butterfly where she set a competition record in the heats.

== Personal life ==
She attended Wavell State High School in Brisbane.
