= England at the 1974 British Commonwealth Games =

- CG code: ENG
- CGA: Commonwealth Games England

in Christchurch, New Zealand
- Medals Ranked 2nd: Gold 28 Silver 31 Bronze 21 Total 80

British Commonwealth Games appearances
- 1930; 1934; 1938; 1950; 1954; 1958; 1962; 1966; 1970; 1974; 1978; 1982; 1986; 1990; 1994; 1998; 2002; 2006; 2010; 2014; 2018; 2022; 2026; 2030

England competed at the 1974 British Commonwealth Games in Christchurch, New Zealand, from 24 January - 2 February 1974.

England finished second in the medal table behind Australia with 28 gold medals, 31 silver medals and 21 bronze medals.

== Medal table (top three) ==
Rank	Nation	Gold	Silver	Bronze	Total
1	Australia	29	28	35	92
2	England	28	31	21	80
3	Canada	25	19	18	62
Totals (3 entries)		82	78	74	234

The athletes that competed are listed below.

== Athletics ==
Name	Event/s	Medal/s
Joan Allison	800m, 1500m	1 x silver
Brenda Bedford	shot put	
David Bedford	5000m, 10,000m	
Verona Bernard	400m, 400m relay	1 x gold, 1 x silver
John Bicourt	3000m steeplechase	
Dave Black	5000m, 10,000m	1 x silver, 1 x bronze
Norine Braithwaite	1500m	
Pete Browne	800m	
Colin Campbell	800m	
Geoff Capes	discus, shot put	1 x gold
Sheila Carey	800m, 1500m	
Andy Carter	800m, 1500m, 400m relay	1 x silver
Ian Chipchase	hammer	1 x gold
Maureen Chitty	long jump	
Charles Clover	javelin	1 x gold
Derek George Cole	100m relay	
Sharon Corbett	javelin	1 x bronze
Pat Cropper	800m	
Pru French	javelin	
Brendan Foster	1500m, 5000m	1 x silver
Graham Gower	110m hurdles	
Brian Green	100m, 200m, 100m relay	
Val Harrison	high jump	
Donna Hartley	200m	
Bill Hartley	400m hurdles, 400m relay	1 x silver
Raymond Edward Hearn	400m	
Ron Hill	marathon	
Wendy Hill	200m	
John Hillier	discus	1 x bronze
Steve Hollings	3000m steeplechase	
Janet Honour	100m hurdles, pentathlon	
Brian Hooper	pole vault	1 x bronze
Ruth Kennedy	400m relay	1 x gold
Barry King	decathlon	1 x silver
John Kirkbride	1500m	
Colin Kirkham	marathon	
Sonia Lannaman	100m, 100m relay	1 x silver
Barbara Lawton	high jump	1 x gold
Carl Philip Lawton	20 mile walk	
Alan Lerwill	triple jump, long jump	1 x gold
Andrea Lynch	100m, 100m relay	2 x silver
Sue Mapstone	pentathlon	
Barbara Martin	100m, 200m, 100m relay	1 x silver
Ian Christopher Matthews	100m, 200m, 100m relay	
Chris Monk	100m, 200m, 100m relay	
Alan Pascoe	400m hurdles, 400m relay	1 x gold, 1 x silver
Howard Payne	hammer	1 x silver
Sue Pettett	400m relay	1 x gold
Brian Stanley Roberts	javelin	
Jannette Roscoe	400m, 400m relay	1 x gold
Tessa Sanderson	javelin	
John Sherwood	400m hurdles	
Sheila Sherwood	long jump	
Ann Simmonds	100m hurdles, high jump, long jump	1 x bronze
Tony Simmons	10,000m	
Dorothy Swinyard	discus, shot put	
Bill Tancred	discus, shot put	1 x silver
Ian Thompson	marathon	1 x gold
Roy Thorpe	20 mile walk	1 x silver
Dave Travis	javelin	1 x silver
Judy Vernon	100m hurdles, 100m relay	1 x gold, 1 x silver
John Warhurst	20 mile walk	1 x gold
Dawn Webster	400m	
Barry Williams	hammer	
John Wilson	400m, 400m relay	1 x silver
Mike Winch	shot put	1 x silver

== Badminton ==
Name	Event/s	Medal/s
Margaret Beck	singles, doubles	1 x gold, 1 x silver
Margaret Boxall	doubles. mixed	1 x silver
Nora Gardner	singles, mixed	1 x silver
Gillian Gilks	singles, doubles, mixed	3 x gold
Ray Stevens	doubles	1 x silver
Elliot Stuart	singles, doubles, mixed	1 x gold, 1 x bronze
Derek Talbot	singles, doubles, mixed	2 x gold, 1 x bronze
Mike Tredgett	singles, doubles, mixed	1 x silver
Paul Whetnall	singles, mixed	1 x silver
Susan Whetnall	singles, doubles, mixed	1 x silver, 2 x bronze

== Boxing ==
Name	Event/s	Medal/s
Michael Abrams	48kg light-flyweight	
Patrick Cowdell	54kg bantamweight	1 x gold
Robbie Davies	71kg light-middlweight	1 x bronze
Tommy Dunn	63.5kg light-welterweight	
Colin Flinn	57kg featherweight	
Des Gwilliam	60kg lightweight	
Roy Hilton	51kg flyweight	
Bill Knight	81kg middlweight	1 x gold
Neville Meade	91kg heavyweight	1 x gold
Carl Speare	75kg middleweight	1 x bronze

== Cycling ==
Name	Event/s	Medal/s
Mick Bennett	scratch race, pursuit, team pursuit	1 x gold
Maurice Burton	match sprint	
Geoff Cooke	match sprint, tandem	1 x gold
Ernie Crutchlow	match sprint, tandem	1 x gold
Phil Edwards	road race	
Rik Evans	time trial, team pursuit	1 x gold
Phil Griffiths	road race	
Ian Hallam	scratch race, time trial, pursuit, team pursuit	2 x gold, 2 x bronze
Steve Heffernan	scratch race, time trial	1 x gold
William Moore	pursuit, team pursuit	1 x gold, 1 x silver
Peter Watson	road race	

== Diving ==
Name	Event/s	Medal/s
Martyn Brown	10m platform	
Alison Drake	3m springboard	
Trevor Simpson	3m springboard	1 x bronze
Beverly Williams	10m platform	1 x silver

== Lawn bowls ==
Name	Event/s	Medal/s
David Bryant	singles	1 x gold
Dave Crocker	rinks/fours	
John Evans	pairs	1 x silver
Ted Hayward	rinks/fours	
Peter Line	pairs	1 x silver
Bob Robertson	rinks/fours	
Harry Taylor	rinks/fours	

== Shooting ==
Name	Event/s	Medal/s
Laszlo Antal	50m free pistol	1 x bronze
Brian Bailey	clay pigeon trap	1 x silver
Frank Balcombe	50m rifle prone	
Alec Bonnett	skeet	
Tony Clark	rapid fire pistol	
John Cooke	50m free pistol, rapid fire pistol	
Malcolm Cooper	50m rifle prone	
Joe Neville	clay pigeon trap, skeet	1 x silver
Keith Pilcher	fullbore rifle pair	
James Spaight	fullbore rifle pair	1 x bronze

== Swimming ==
Name	Event/s	Medal/s
Lesley Allardice	100/200 freestyle, relay	1 x bronze
Joanne Atkinson	100 butterfly, 200 medley, relay	
Brian Brinkley	200 butterfly, 200/400 medley, relays	1 x gold, 3 x silver, 2 x bronze
Colin Cunningham	100/200 backstroke, 100 butterfly, 100 freestyle, relays	1 x silver, 2 x bronze
Neil Dexter	200/400 freestyle, relay	1 x silver
Susan Edmondson	100/200/400 freestyle, relay	1 x bronze
Martin Edwards	100/200 butterfly	
Christine Gaskell	100/200 breaststroke, relay	1 x gold
June Green	200/400/800 freestyle	
Christine Jarvis	100/200 breaststroke	
Jean Jeavons	100/200 butterfly	
Alyson Jones	100 freestyle, 100 butterfly, relays	1 x bronze
Margaret Kelly	100/200 backstroke, relay	
David Leigh	100/200 breaststroke, relay	1 x gold, 1 x silver, 1 x bronze
Paul Naisby	100/200 breaststroke, 200 medley	2 x bronze
Stephen Nash	100/200 butterfly, relay	1 x bronze
Susan Richardson	200/400 medley	
Caroline Tamlyn	100/200 breaststroke, 200 butterfly	
Raymond Terrell	200/400 medley, relays	1 x silver, 2 x bronze
Keith Walton	100 freestyle, relay	1 x bronze
Avis Willington	200/400 medley, relay	1 x bronze

== Weightlifting ==
Name	Event/s	Medal/s
Tony Ford	82.5kg light-heavyweight	1 x gold
Michael Foy	75kg middleweight	
Dave Hancock	+110kg super-heavyweight	
Andy Kerr	*110kg super-heavyweight	1 x silver
Precious McKenzie	52kg flyweight	1 x gold
George Newton	67.5kg lightweight	1 x gold
Mike Pearman	82.5kg light-heavyweight	1 x bronze
Brian Strange	110kg heavyweight	
Alan Winterbourne	60kg featherweight	

== Wrestling ==
Name	Event/s	Medal/s
Joey Gilligan	68kg lightweight	1 x silver
Ronald Grinstead	82kg middleweight	
Tony Shacklady	74kg welterweight	1 x silver
Amrik Singh Gill	57kg bantamweight	1 x silver
Paul Toole	62kg featherweight	
