= Rosemary Milgate =

Australian swimmer

Personal information
- Born: 5 April 1959 (age 67)

Sport
- Sport: Swimming
Medal record
Women's swimming
Representing Australia
Commonwealth Games
Bronze medal – third place	1974 Christchurch	800 m freestyle

Rosemary Milgate (born 5 April 1959) is an Australian former swimmer. She competed in two events at the 1976 Summer Olympics.
