= Sonya Gray =

Australian swimmer (born 1959)

Personal information
- Born: 8 November 1959 (age 66) Lambton, New South Wales, Australia

Sport
- Sport: Swimming
- Strokes: freestyle
Medal record
Representing Australia
Commonwealth Games
Gold medal – first place	1974 Christchurch	100 m freestyle
Gold medal – first place	1974 Christchurch	200 m freestyle
Silver medal – second place	1974 Christchurch	4x100m freestyle

Sonya Gray (born 8 November 1959) is an Australian former swimmer. She competed in the women's 200 metre freestyle at the 1976 Summer Olympics.
