= Swimming at the 1978 Commonwealth Games =

- Venue: Kinsmen Aquatic Centre
- Location: Edmonton, Canada
- Dates: 3 to 12 August 1978

Swimming at the 1978 Commonwealth Games was the 11th appearance of Swimming at the Commonwealth Games. There were 29 swimming events and they took place from 3 to 12 August 1978.

The events were held at the Kinsmen Aquatic Centre, part of the Kinsmen Sports Centre complex. The aquatic centre was constructed in 1976 specifically for the Games.

Canada topped the medal table with 15 gold medals. It was the first time since 1938 that Australia had failed to top the table and only four nations managed to secure swimming medals.

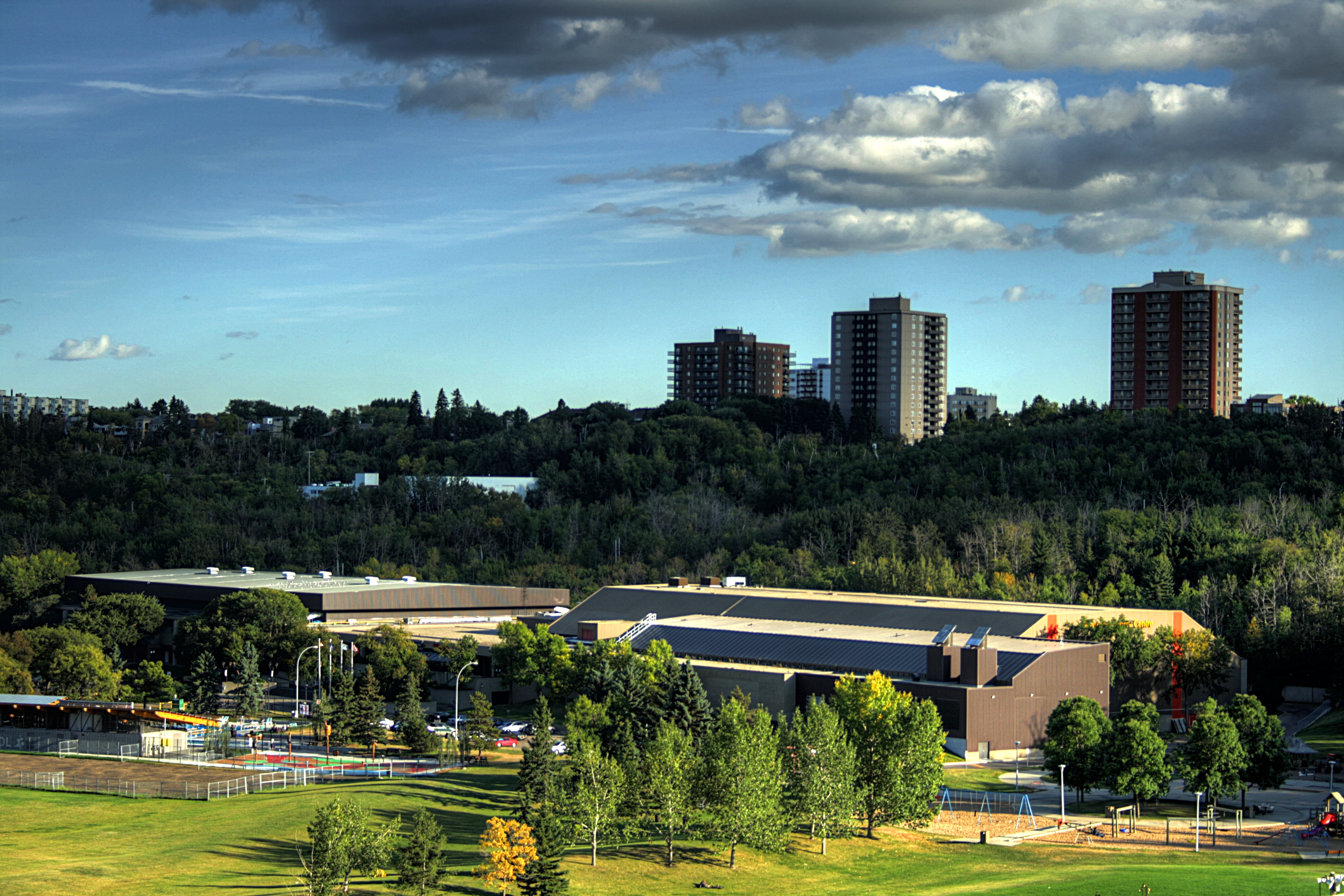
The aquatic centre (on the left) was constructed in 1976

== Medal table ==
* Host nation (Canada)

Medals won by nation with totals, ranked by number of golds—sortable
Rank	Nation	Gold	Silver	Bronze	Total
1	Canada*	15	7	9	31
2	Australia	10	9	11	30
3	England	2	11	7	20
4	New Zealand	2	2	2	6
Totals (4 entries)		29	29	29	87

== Medallists ==
Men

Event	Gold	Silver	Bronze
100 m freestyle	(Australia) Mark Morgan	(Canada) Bill Sawchuk	(Canada) Gary MacDonald
200 m freestyle	(Australia) Ron McKeon	(Australia) Graeme Brewer	(Australia) Mark Morgan
400 m freestyle	(Australia) Ron McKeon	(England) Simon Gray	(Australia) Max Metzker
1500 m freestyle	(Australia) Max Metzker	(England) Simon Gray	(England) Andrew Astbury
100 m backstroke	(Australia) Glenn Patching	(England) Gary Abraham	(Canada) Jay Tapp
200 m backstroke	(New Zealand) Gary Hurring	(Australia) Glenn Patching	(Australia) Paul Moorfoot
100 m breaststroke	(Canada) Graham Smith	(England) Duncan Goodhew	(England) Paul Naisby
200 m breaststroke	(Canada) Graham Smith	(England) Duncan Goodhew	(Australia) Lindsay Spencer
100 m butterfly	(Canada) Dan Thompson	(England) John Mills	(Canada) Bill Sawchuk
200 m butterfly	(Canada) George Nagy	(Canada) Claus Bredschneider	(England) Phil Hubble
200 m individual medley	(Canada) Graham Smith	(Canada) Bill Sawchuk	(Australia) Peter Dawson
400 m individual medley	(Canada) Graham Smith	(England) Simon Gray	(Canada) Bill Sawchuk
4 × 100 m freestyle relay	(Canada); Bill Sawchuk; Gary MacDonald; Graham Smith; Peter Szmidt	(Australia); Glenn Patching; Graeme Brewer; Mark Morgan; Ron McKeon	(England); David Dunne; Kevin Burns; Martin Smith; Richard Burrell
4 × 200 m freestyle relay	(Australia); Graeme Brewer; Mark Morgan; Max Metzker; Ron McKeon	(Canada); Bill Sawchuk; Dennis Corcoran; Peter Szmidt; Robert Baylis	(England); David Dunne; Martin Smith; Philip Hubble; Simon Gray
4 × 100 m medley relay	(Canada); Bill Sawchuk; Dan Thompson; Graham Smith; Jay Tapp	(England); Gary Abraham; Duncan Goodhew; John Mills; Martin Smith	(Australia); Glenn Patching; Graeme Brewer; Lindsay Spencer; Mark Morgan

Women

Event	Gold	Silver	Bronze
100 m freestyle	(Canada) Carol Klimpel	(Australia) Rosemary Brown	(Canada) Wendy Quirk
200 m freestyle	(New Zealand) Rebecca Perrott	(Australia) Tracey Wickham	(Australia) Michelle Ford
400 m freestyle	(Australia) Tracey Wickham	(Australia) Michelle Ford	(New Zealand) Rebecca Perrott
800 m freestyle	(Australia) Tracey Wickham	(Australia) Michelle Ford	(New Zealand) Rebecca Perrott
100 m backstroke	(Australia) Debra Forster	(Canada) Hélène Boivin	(Canada) Cheryl Gibson
200 m backstroke	(Canada) Cheryl Gibson	(Australia) Lisa Forrest	(Australia) Glenda Robertson
100 m breaststroke	(Canada) Robin Corsiglia	(England) Maggie Kelly	(Canada) Marian Stuart
200 m breaststroke	(Canada) Lisa Borsholt	(England) Debbie Rudd	(England) Maggie Kelly
100 m butterfly	(Canada) Wendy Quirk	(New Zealand) Penny McCarthy	(Australia) Linda Hanel
200 m butterfly	(Australia) Michelle Ford	(Canada) Wendy Quirk	(Australia) Linda Hanel
200 m individual medley	(England) Sharron Davies	(New Zealand) Rebecca Perrott	(Canada) Becky Smith
400 m individual medley	(England) Sharron Davies	(Canada) Becky Smith	(Canada) Cheryl Gibson
4 × 100 m freestyle relay	(Canada); Carol Klimpel; Gail Amundrud; Sue Sloan; Wendy Quirk	(England); Cheryl Brazendale; Heidi Turk; Kaye Lovatt; Sharron Davies	(Australia); Lisa Burnes; Michelle Ford; Rosemary Brown; Tracey Wickham
4 × 100 m medley relay	(Canada); Carol Klimpel; Hélène Boivin; Marian Stuart; Wendy Quirk	(Australia); Debra Forster; Lisa Curry-Kenny; Rosemary Brown; Tracey Wickham	(England); Helen Gilyard; Margaret Kelly; Sharron Davies; Sue Jenner

== Finals (men) ==
=== 100m freestyle ===
Pos	Athlete	Time
1	(Australia) Mark Morgan	52.70
2	(Canada) Bill Sawchuk	52.81
3	(Canada) Gary MacDonald	52.90
4	(Australia) Graeme Brewer	52.95
5	(Canada) Peter Szmidt	53.13
6	(Australia) Glenn Patching	53.63
7	(Scotland) Gordon Downie	53.81
8	(England) Richard Burrell	53.82

=== 200m freestyle ===
Pos	Athlete	Time
1	(Australia) Ron McKeon	1:52.06
2	(Australia) Graeme Brewer	1:52.86
3	(Australia) Mark Morgan	1:53.16
4	(Scotland) Gordon Downie	1:54.44
5	(England) David Dunne	1:54.58
6	(Canada) Peter Szmidt	1:55.41
7	(Canada) Dennis Michael Corcoran	1:56.07
8	(England) Martin Smith	1:56.07

=== 400m freestyle ===
Pos	Athlete	Time
1	(Australia) Ron McKeon	3:54.43
2	(England) Simon Gray	3:56.87
3	(Australia) Max Metzker	3:58.83
4	(Canada) Peter Szmidt	3:58.86
5	(England) Andrew Astbury	4:01.12
6	(New Zealand) Brett Naylor	4:03.59
7	(Canada) Dennis Michael Corcoran	4:04.63
8	(England) Steve Lewington	4:05.62

=== 1500m freestyle ===
Pos	Athlete	Time
1	(Australia) Max Metzker	15:31.92
2	(England) Simon Gray	15:39.39
3	(England) Andrew Astbury	15:42.89
4	(Australia) Paul Nash	15:44.42
5	(Canada) Peter Szmidt	15.57.18
6	(Canada) Robert David Baylis	16:14.88
7	(England) Steve Lewington	16:15.05
8	(Canada) Dennis Michael Corcoran	16:27.35

=== 100m backstroke ===
Pos	Athlete	Time
1	(Australia) Glenn Patching	57.90
2	(England) Gary Abraham	58.48
3	(Canada) Jay Tapp	59.05
4	(Canada) Wade Flemons	59.56
5	(Scotland) Paul Julian Marshall	59.57
6	(Scotland) James Carter	59.79
7	(Canada) Cameron Henning	1:00.33
8	(Australia) Paul Moorfoot	1:00.92

=== 200m backstroke ===
Pos	Athlete	Time
1	(New Zealand) Gary Hurring	2:04.37
2	(Australia) Glenn Patching	2:05.76
3	(Australia) Paul Moorfoot	2:05.99
4	(Canada) Cameron Henning	2:06.35
5	(Canada) Mike Scarth	2:07.13
6	(Scotland) James Carter	2:07.91
7	(England) Gary Abraham	2:08.45
8	(New Zealand) Ian R. Bullock	2:09.24

=== 100m breaststroke ===
Pos	Athlete	Time
1	(Canada) Graham Smith	1:03.81
2	(England) Duncan Goodhew	1:04.24
3	(England) Paul Naisby	1:06.36
4	(Canada) Bruce Kent	1:06.96
5	(Australia) Lindsay Spencer	1:07.00
6	(Wales) Leigh Atkinson	1:07.70
7	(Canada) Gregory Luke Wurzback	1:07.83
8	(Australia) Michael Joseph Foley	1:07.95

=== 200m breaststroke ===
Pos	Athlete	Time
1	(Canada) Graham Smith	2:20.86
2	(England) Duncan Goodhew	2:21.92
3	(Australia) Lindsay Spencer	2:22.49
4	(Australia) Michael Joseph Foley	2:24.76
5	(Canada) Gregory Luke Wurzback	2:25.31
6	(Canada) Bruce Kent	2:25.38
7	(England) Paul Naisby	2:27.46
8	(Wales) Leigh Atkinson	2:27.95

=== 100m butterfly ===
Pos	Athlete	Time
1	(Canada) Dan Thompson	55.04
2	(England) John Mills	56.22
3	(Canada) Bill Sawchuk	56.37
4	(New Zealand) Paul Rowe	56.61
5	(England) Phil Hubble	56.78
6	(Canada) George Nagy	57.13
7	(England) Gary Abraham	57.29
8	(Australia) Mark Morgan	57.51

=== 200m butterfly ===
Pos	Athlete	Time
1	(Canada) George Nagy	2:01.99
2	(Canada) Claus Bredschneider	2:02.49
3	(England) Phil Hubble	2:02.53
4	(England) Simon Gray	2:03.48
5	(Canada) Richard Robert Nagy	2:04.57
6	(Australia) Trevor George Cracknell	2:05.01
7	(Scotland) Alan McClatchey	2:05.69
8	(Wales) Peter Morris	2:06.84

=== 200m medley ===
Pos	Athlete	Time
1	(Canada) Graham Smith	2:05.25
2	(Canada) Bill Sawchuk	2:05.61
3	(Australia) Peter Dawson	2:09.05
4	(Canada) Christopher Erickson	2:10.64
5	(England) Duncan Cleworth	2:10.68
6	(Jamaica) Andrew Phillips	2:15.55
7	(Northern Ireland) Ian Stanley Corry	2:16.45
8	(Wales) Martin Morgan Thomas	2:18.35

=== 400m medley ===
Pos	Athlete	Time
1	(Canada) Graham Smith	4:27.34
2	(England) Simon Gray	4:27.70
3	(Canada) Bill Sawchuk	4:27.99
4	(Canada) George Michael Nagy	4:34.65
5	(Australia) Peter Dawson	4:35.25
6	(Scotland) Alan McClatchey	4:36.47
7	(England) Duncan Cleworth	4:38.10
8	(Australia) Paul Moorfoot	4:40.69

=== 4 x 100m freestyle relay ===
Pos	Athlete	Time
1	(Canada) Sawchuk, MacDonald, Smith, Szmidt	3:27.94
2	(Australia) Patching, Brewer, Morgan, McKeon	3:28.62
3	(England) Dunne, Burns, Smith, Burrell	3:30.10
4	(Scotland) Iredale, McClatchey, Dawson, Downie	3:34.23
5	(New Zealand) Salisbury, Naylor, Bullock, Rowe	3:35.53
6	(Wales) Taylor, Thomas, Roberts, Sadler,	3:42.17
7	(Gibraltar) S.Sivers, Standish, L.Sivers, Vinales	4:06.96

=== 4 x 200 freestyle relay ===
Pos	Athlete	Time
1	(Australia) Brewer, Morgan, Metzker, McKeon	7:34.83
2	(Canada) Sawchuk, Corcoran, Szmidt, Baylis	7:36.58
3	(England) Dunne, Smith, Hubble, Gray	7:42.02
4	(Scotland) McClatchey, Campbell, Marshall, Downie	7:46.89
5	(New Zealand) Salisbury, Naylor, Bullock, Rowe	7:52.00

=== 4 x 100 medley relay ===
Pos	Athlete	Time
1	(Canada) Sawchuk, Thompson, Smith, Tapp	3:49.76
2	(England) Abraham, Goodhew, Mills, Smith	3:50.22
3	(Australia) Patching, Brewer, Spencer, Morgan	3:53.16
4	(Scotland) Downie, Oldershaw, Marshall, Iredale	3:59.67
5	(Wales) Sadler, Atkinson, Taylor, Roberts	4:02.14
6	(Northern Ireland) Corry, Meharg, Howard, Magowan	4:11.52

== Finals (women) ==
=== 100m freestyle ===
Pos	Athlete	Time
1	(Canada) Carol Klimpel	X57.78
2	(Australia) Rosemary Brown	58.30
3	(Canada) Wendy Quirk	58.41
4	(Canada) Sue Sloan	58.44
5	(England) Cheryl Brazendale	59.57
6	(England) Heidi Turk	59.58
7	(Wales) Vanessa Jane Bullock	1:00.08
8	(Australia) Lisa Gaye Burnes	1:00.29

=== 200m freestyle ===
Pos	Athlete	Time
1	(New Zealand) Rebecca Perrott	2:00.63
2	(Australia) Tracey Wickham	2:01.50
3	(Australia) Michelle Ford	2:01.64
4	(Canada) Wendy Quirk	2:04.08
5	(England) Sharron Davies	2:04.11
6	(Canada) Nancy Garapick	2:04.19
7	(Australia) Rosemary Brown	2:05.40
8	(Canada) Gail Amundrud	2:05.59

=== 400m freestyle ===
Pos	Athlete	Time
1	(Australia) Tracey Wickham	4:08.45
2	(Australia) Michelle Ford	4:10.25
3	(New Zealand) Rebecca Perrott	4:16.70
4	(Australia) Rosemary Brown	4:18.06
5	(Canada) Susan Marguereite Mason	4:24.63
6	(Canada) Barbara Anna Shockey	4:25.51
7	(England) Cheryl Brazendale	4:26.41
8	(Scotland) Denise McPhillamy	4:34.39

=== 800m freestyle ===
Pos	Athlete	Time
1	(Australia) Tracey Wickham	8:24.62
2	(Australia) Michelle Ford	8:25.78
3	(New Zealand) Rebecca Perrott	8:44.87
4	(Australia) Joanne Lynn Litzow	8:47.42
5	(Canada) Barbara Anna Shockey	9:02.23
6	(Canada) Lorinda Marianne Parkes	9:04.82
7	(Canada) Jennifer Boulianne	9:05.41
8	(Singapore) Junie Sng	9:24.49

=== 100m backstroke ===
Pos	Athlete	Time
1	(Australia) Debra Forster	1:03.97
2	(Canada) Hélène Boivin	1:04.54
3	(Canada) Cheryl Gibson	1:04.68
4	(Canada) Becky Smith	1:05.37
5	(England) Helen Gilyard	1:05.98
6	(England) Joy Beasley	1:06.03
7	(Australia) Lisa Forrest	1:06.40
8	(Australia) Glenda Robertson	1:06.68

=== 200m backstroke ===
Pos	Athlete	Time
1	(Canada) Cheryl Gibson	2:16.57
2	(Australia) Lisa Forrest	2:17.66
3	(Australia) Glenda Robertson	2:18.32
4	(Australia) Debra Forster	2:18.41
5	(Canada) Suzanne Kwasny	2:18.69
6	(Canada) Jennifer Boulianne	2:21.04
7	(New Zealand) Melanie Jones	2:21.20
8	(England) Joy Beasley	2:23.59

=== 100m breaststroke ===
Pos	Athlete	Time
1	(Canada) Robin Corsiglia	1:13.56
2	(England) Maggie Kelly	1:13.69
3	(Canada) Marian Stuart	1:13.72
4	(Australia) Lisa Curry	1:13.85
5	(England) Debbie Rudd	1:14.69
6	(Canada) Judy Susan Garay	1:14.72
7	(Scotland) Jean Hill	1:16.04
8	(Scotland) Maureen Campbell	1:16.30

=== 200m breaststroke ===
Pos	Athlete	Time
1	(Canada) Lisa Borsholt	2:37.70
2	(England) Debbie Rudd	2:38.07
3	(England) Maggie Kelly	2:38.63
4	(Australia) Lisa Curry	2:38.81
5	(Canada) Christine Hodson	2:40.36
6	(Canada) Robin Corsiglia	2:44.54
7	(Scotland) Maureen Campbell	2:45.94
8	(Australia) Lynne Prosser	2:48.04

=== 100m butterfly ===
Pos	Athlete	Time
1	(Canada) Wendy Quirk	1:01.92
2	(New Zealand) Penny McCarthy	1:02.27
3	(Australia) Linda Hanel	1:02.69
4	(Canada) Sue Sloan	1:03.02
5	(Canada) Kelly Albright	1:03.12
6	(England) Sue Jenner	1:03.31
7	(Australia) Karen Van de Graaf	1:03.53
8	(England) Ann Osgerby	1:03.64

=== 200m butterfly ===
Pos	Athlete	Time
1	(Australia) Michelle Ford	2:11.29
2	(Canada) Wendy Quirk	2:13.65
3	(Australia) Linda Hanel	2:14.52
4	(Canada) Kelly Albright	2:14.83
5	(Canada) Cheryl Gibson	2:16.77
6	(England) Sue Jenner	2:16.78
7	(England) Ann Osgerby	2:17.00
8	(Australia) Karen Van de Graaf	2:18.32

=== 200m medley ===
Pos	Athlete	Time
1	(England) Sharron Davies	2:18.37
2	(New Zealand) Rebecca Perrott	2:18.70
3	(Canada) Becky Smith	2:18.95
4	(Australia) Lisa Curry	2:20.59
5	(Canada) Nancy Garapick	2:21.46
6	(Canada) Cheryl Gibson	2:22.40
7	(Australia) Michelle Pearson	2:24.82
8	(New Zealand) Andrea Jane Hawcridge	2:27.07

=== 400m medley ===
Pos	Athlete	Time
1	(England) Sharron Davies	4:52.44
2	(Canada) Becky Smith	4:57.83
3	(Canada) Cheryl Gibson	4:59.39
4	(England) Moira Houston	5:02.98
5	(Australia) Michele Pearson	5:04.10
6	(Canada) Christine Hodson	5:05.49
7	(Australia) Lynne Prosser	5:09.26
8	(Australia) Karen Van de Graaf	5:11.63

=== 4 x 100 freestyle relay ===
Pos	Athlete	Time
1	(Canada) Kilmpel, Amundrud, Sloan, Quirk	3:50.28
2	(England) Brazendale, Turk, Lovatt, Davies	3:53.27
3	(Australia) Burnes, Ford, Brown, Wickham	3:54.11
4	(Wales) James, Adams, Motley, Bullock	4:02.28
5	(Scotland) Rose, McPhillamy, Hendry, Dickie	4:07.30
6	(New Zealand) Hawcridge, Jones, McCarthy, Perrott	disq

=== 4 x 100 medley relay ===
Pos	Athlete	Time
1	(Canada) Klimpel, Boivin, Stuart, Quirk	4:15.26
2	(Australia) Forster, Curry, Brown, Wickham	4:16.75
3	(England) Gilyard, Kelly, Davies, Jenner	4:19.87
4	(Scotland) Rose, McPhillamy, Campbell, Dickie	4:30.15
5	(Wales) James, Adams, Motley, Bullock	4:32.15
6	(Northern Ireland) Scott, Logan, Law, Parkes	4:43.99

== See also ==
- Diving at the 1978 Commonwealth Games
