= Australia at the 1978 Commonwealth Games =

- CG code: AUS
- CGA: Australian Commonwealth Games Association
- Website: commonwealthgames.org.au

in Edmonton, Alberta, Canada
- Competitors: 148 in 11 sports
- Flag bearers: Opening: - Remo Sansonetti and Salvatore Sansonetti; Closing:Tracey Wickham
- Officials: 42
- Medals Ranked 3rd: Gold 24 Silver 33 Bronze 27 Total 84

Commonwealth Games appearances (overview)
- 1930; 1934; 1938; 1950; 1954; 1958; 1962; 1966; 1970; 1974; 1978; 1982; 1986; 1990; 1994; 1998; 2002; 2006; 2010; 2014; 2018; 2022; 2026; 2030

Australia competed at the 1978 Commonwealth Games in Edmonton Canada from 3 to 12 August 1978. It was Australia's eleventh appearance at the Commonwealth Games, having competed at every Games since their inception in 1930.

Australia won medals in ten of the eleven sports that it entered.

== Medallists ==
The following Australian competitors won medals at the games.

Medal	Name	Sport	Event
Gold	Rick Mitchell	Athletics	Men's 400 metres
Gold	Peter Farmer	Athletics	Men's hammer throw
Gold	Denise Boyd	Athletics	Women's 200 metres
Gold	Judy Peckham	Athletics	Women's 800 metres
Gold	Katrina Gibbs	Athletics	Women's high jump
Gold	Gael Mulhall	Athletics	Women's shot put
Gold	Philip McElwaine	Boxing	Men's Middleweight
Gold	Kenrick Tucker	Cycling	Men's Sprint
Gold	Colin Fitzgerald; Kevin Nichols; Gary Sutton; Shane Sutton	Cycling	Men's Team Pursuit
Gold	Phil Anderson	Cycling	Men's Road Race
Gold	Mark Morgan	Swimming	Men's 100 metres Freestyle
Gold	Ron McKeon	Swimming	Men's 200 metres Freestyle
Gold	Ron McKeon	Swimming	Men's 400 metres Freestyle
Gold	Max Metzker	Swimming	Men's 1500 metres Freestyle
Gold	Glenn Patching	Swimming	Men's 100 metres Backstroke
Gold	Graeme Brewer; Mark Morgan; Max Metzker; Ron McKeon	Swimming	Men's 4 x 200 metres Freestyle Relay
Gold	Tracey Wickham	Swimming	Women's 400 metres Freestyle
Gold	Tracey Wickham	Swimming	Women's 800 metres Freestyle
Gold	Debra Forster	Swimming	Women's 100 metres Backstroke
Gold	Michelle Ford	Swimming	Women's 200 metres Butterfly
Gold	Bill Stellios	Weightlifting	Men's Lightweight
Gold	Sam Castiglione	Weightlifting	Men's Middleweight
Gold	Robert Kabbas	Weightlifting	Men's Light Heavyweight
Gold	Zsigmund Kelevitz	Wrestling	Men's Lightweight
Silver	Max Binnington	Athletics	Men's 110 metres hurdles
Silver	Garry Brown	Athletics	Men's 400 metres hurdles
Silver	Willi Sawall	Athletics	Men's 30 km walk
Silver	Don Baird	Athletics	Men's pole vault
Silver	Chris Commons	Athletics	Men's long jump
Silver	Ian Campbell	Athletics	Men's Triple Jump
Silver	Peter Hadfield	Athletics	Men's decathlon
Silver	Raelene Boyle	Athletics	Women's 100 metres
Silver	Erica Hooker	Athletics	Women's long jump
Silver	Gael Mulhall	Athletics	Women's discus throw
Silver	Bethanie Nail; Denise Robertson; Maxine Corcoran; Judy Peckham	Athletics	Women's 4 x 400 metres relay
Silver	John Snell	Lawn bowls	Men's Singles
Silver	Gary Campbell	Cycling	Men's Individual Pursuit
Silver	Kenrick Tucker	Cycling	Men's Time Trial
Silver	Shane Sutton	Cycling	Men's 10 Miles Scratch
Silver	Valerie McFarlane	Diving	Women's 10 Metres Highboard
Silver	Lyndsay Nyland	Gymnastics	Men's All Around
Silver	Graeme Brewer	Swimming	Men's 200 metres Freestyle
Silver	Glenn Patching	Swimming	Men's 200 metres Backstroke
Silver	Glenn Patching; Graeme Brewer; Mark Morgan; Ron McKeon	Swimming	Men's 4 x 100 metres Freestyle Relay
Silver	Rosemary Brown	Swimming	Women's 100 metres Freestyle
Silver	Tracey Wickham	Swimming	Women's 200 metres Freestyle
Silver	Michelle Ford	Swimming	Women's 400 metres Freestyle
Silver	Michelle Ford	Swimming	Women's 800 metres Freestyle
Silver	Lisa Forrest	Swimming	Women's 200 metres Backstroke
Silver	Debra Forster; Lisa Curry; Rosemary Brown; Tracey Wickham	Swimming	Women's 4 x 100 metres Medley Relay
Silver	Ivan Katz	Weightlifting	Men's Featherweight
Silver	Charles Quagliata	Weightlifting	Men's Light Heavyweight
Silver	Adrian Kebbe	Weightlifting	Men's Lightweight
Silver	Steve Wyatt	Weightlifting	Men's Sub Heavyweight
Silver	Bob Edmond	Weightlifting	Men's Super Heavyweight
Silver	Wally Koenig	Wrestling	Men's Middleweight
Silver	Mick Pikos	Wrestling	Men's Light Heavyweight
Bronze	Warren Parr	Athletics	Men's 110 metres hurdles
Bronze	Tim Erickson	Athletics	Men's 30km walk
Bronze	John Higham; Chum Darvall; Garry Brown; Rick Mitchell	Athletics	Men's 4 x 400 metres relay
Bronze	Denise Boyd	Athletics	Women's 100 metres
Bronze	Collen Beazley	Athletics	Women's 200 metres
Bronze	Beathanie Nail	Athletics	Women's 400 metres
Bronze	Colleen Beazley; Denise Robertson; Lyn Jacenko; Roxanne Gelle	Athletics	Women's 4 x 400 metres relay
Bronze	Peter Wighton	Boxing	Men's Flyweight
Bronze	Gary Sutton	Cycling	Men's 10 Miles Scratch
Bronze	Ron Boyle; Stephen Goodall	Cycling	Men's Tandem
Bronze	Don Wagstaff	Diving	Men's 3 Metres Springboard
Bronze	Lambert Ariens; Lindsay Nylund; Rudolf Starosta; Warwick Forbes	Gymnastics	Men's Team
Bronze	Jeff Farrell	Shooting	Men's Open Rapid-Fire Pistol
Bronze	Terry Rumbel	Shooting	Men's Open Trap
Bronze	Mark Morgan	Swimming	Men's 200 metres Freestyle
Bronze	Max Metzker	Swimming	Men's 400 metres Freestyle
Bronze	Paul Moorfoot	Swimming	Men's 200 metres Backstroke
Bronze	Lindsay Spencer	Swimming	Men's 200 metres Breaststroke
Bronze	Peter Dawson	Swimming	Men's 200 metres Individual Medley
Bronze	Glenn Patching; Graeme Brewer; Lindsay Spencer; Mark Morgan	Swimming	Men's 4 x 100 metres Medley Relay
Bronze	Michelle Ford	Swimming	Women's 200 metres Freestyle
Bronze	Glenda Robertson	Swimming	Women's 200 metres Backstroke
Bronze	Linda Hanel	Swimming	Women's 100 metres Butterfly
Bronze	Linda Hanel	Swimming	Women's 200 metres Butterfly
Bronze	Lisa Burnes; Michelle Ford; Rosemary Brown; Tracey Wickham	Swimming	Women's 4 x 100 metres Freestyle Relay
Bronze	Roger Crabtree	Weightlifting	Men's Flyweight
Bronze	Ken Hoyt	Wrestling	Men's Flyweight

Medals by sport
Sport	1st place, gold medalist(s)	2nd place, silver medalist(s)	3rd place, bronze medalist(s)	
Swimming	10	9	11	30
Athletics	6	11	7	24
Cycling	3	3	2	8
Weightlifting	3	5	1	9
Boxing	1	0	1	2
Diving	0	1	1	2
Gymnastics	0	1	1	2
Shooting	0	0	2	2
Lawn bowls	0	1	0	1
Wrestling	1	2	1	4
Total	24	33	27	84

== Officials ==
- General Manager - Les Martyn
- Assistant Manager - James Barry
- Administrative Officer - John Bourke
- Transport Officer - Arthur Tunstall
- Office Assistant - Miriam Fay
- Medical: Medical Officer - Dr Anthony Millar, Physiotherapists - Thomas Dobson, Rcahel Kalman, Messeurs - George Saunders
- Advance Party - Bill Young, Leslie Dunn, Massue McQuiston, Peggy Tunstall
- Attache - Bill Sturgeon
- Section Officials - Athletics Manager - Geoffrey Martin, Assistant Manager - Frederick Napier, Manager Women - Gwen Chester, Athletic Coaches - Francis Day, Norman Osborne; Badminton Manager - Don Stockins, Basminton Training Co-ordinator - Ian Hutchinson; Lawn Bowls Manager - Leslie Fynmore; Boxing Manager - Sol Spitanic, Boxing Coach - Paul Thompson; Cycling Manager - Bernard Sweetman, Track Coach - Alexander Fulcher, Road Coach - Kenneth Trowell; Gymnastics Manager - Graham Bond, Men's Coach - Barry Cheales, Women's Coach - Ollie Maywald; Shooting Manager - Newton Thomas; Training Coordinator - Peter Anderson; Swimming Manager - Clive Rickards, Manager Women - Joyce Horne, Head Coach - Terry Buck, Coaches - Joe King, Bill Sweetenham, Diving Manager - John Sherry; Weightlifting Manager - Lyn Jones, Trainer - Paul Coffa; Wrestling Manager - Geoffrey Jameson; Coachj - Sam Parker

== See also ==
- Australia at the 1976 Summer Olympics
- Australia at the 1980 Summer Olympics
