= List of Commonwealth Games medallists in swimming (men) =

This is the complete list of men's Commonwealth Games medallists in swimming from 1930 to 2022.

== Current program ==
=== 50 metre freestyle ===
Games	Gold	Silver	Bronze
1990 Auckland	Andrew Baildon; Australia	Angus Waddell; Australia	Mark Foster; England
1994 Victoria	Mark Foster; England	Darren Lange; Australia	Peter Williams; South Africa
1998 Kuala Lumpur	Mark Foster; England	Brendon Dedekind; South Africa	Michael Klim; Australia
2002 Manchester	Roland Schoeman; South Africa	Brett Hawke; Australia	Mark Foster; England
2006 Melbourne	Roland Schoeman; South Africa	Brent Hayden; Canada	Brett Hawke; Australia
2010 Delhi	Brent Hayden; Canada	Roland Schoeman; South Africa	Gideon Louw; South Africa
2014 Glasgow	Ben Proud; England	Cameron McEvoy; Australia	James Magnussen; Australia
2018 Gold Coast	Ben Proud; England	Brad Tandy; South Africa	Cameron McEvoy; Australia
2022 Birmingham	Ben Proud; England	Lewis Burras; England	Joshua Liendo; Canada
2026 Glasgow	Cameron McEvoy; Australia	Flynn Southam; Australia	Jamie Jack; Australia

=== 100 metre freestyle ===
Games	Gold	Silver	Bronze
1970 Edinburgh	Michael Wenden; Australia	Greg Rogers; Australia	William Devenish; Australia
1974 Christchurch	Michael Wenden; Australia	Bruce Robertson; Canada	Brian Phillips; Canada
1978 Edmonton	Mark Morgan; Australia	Bill Sawchuk; Canada	Gary MacDonald; Canada
1982 Brisbane	Neil Brooks; Australia	Greg Fasala; Australia	Michael Delany; Australia
1986 Edinburgh	Greg Fasala; Australia	Neil Brooks; Australia	Andy Jameson; England
1990 Auckland	Andrew Baildon; Australia	Chris Fydler; Australia	Mike Fibbens; England
1994 Victoria	Stephen Clarke; Canada	Chris Fydler; Australia	Andrew Baildon; Australia
1998 Kuala Lumpur	Michael Klim; Australia	Chris Fydler; Australia	Gavin Meadows; England
2002 Manchester	Ian Thorpe; Australia	Ashley Callus; Australia	Ryk Neethling; South Africa
2006 Melbourne	Simon Burnett; England	Ryk Neethling; South Africa	Roland Schoeman; South Africa
2010 Delhi	Brent Hayden; Canada	Simon Burnett; England	Eamon Sullivan; Australia
2014 Glasgow	James Magnussen; Australia	Cameron McEvoy; Australia	Tommaso D'Orsogna; Australia
2018 Gold Coast	Duncan Scott; Scotland	Kyle Chalmers; Australia	none awarded
2018 Gold Coast	Duncan Scott; Scotland	Chad le Clos; South Africa	none awarded
2022 Birmingham	Kyle Chalmers; Australia	Tom Dean; England	Duncan Scott; Scotland
2026 Glasgow	Flynn Southam; Australia	Matt Richards; Wales	Kyle Chalmers; Australia

=== 200 metre freestyle ===
Games	Gold	Silver	Bronze
1970 Edinburgh	Michael Wenden; Australia	Ralph Hutton; Canada	Greg Rogers; Australia
1974 Christchurch	Steve Badger; Australia	Bruce Robertson; Canada	Michael Wenden; Australia
1978 Edmonton	Ron McKeon; Australia	Graeme Brewer; Australia	Mark Morgan; Australia
1982 Brisbane	Andrew Astbury; England	Peter Szmidt; Canada	Ron McKeon; Australia
1986 Edinburgh	Roberto Gleria; Australia	Peter Dale; Australia	Thomas Stachewicz; Australia
1990 Auckland	Martin Roberts; Australia	Ian Brown; Australia	Thomas Stachewicz; Australia
1994 Victoria	Kieren Perkins; Australia	Trent Bray; New Zealand	Danyon Loader; New Zealand
1998 Kuala Lumpur	Ian Thorpe; Australia	Michael Klim; Australia	Daniel Kowalski; Australia
2002 Manchester	Ian Thorpe; Australia	Grant Hackett; Australia	Rick Say; Canada
2006 Melbourne	Ross Davenport; England	Simon Burnett; England	Brent Hayden; Canada
2010 Delhi	Robert Renwick; Scotland	Kenrick Monk; Australia	Thomas Fraser-Holmes; Australia
2014 Glasgow	Thomas Fraser-Holmes; Australia	Cameron McEvoy; Australia	Calum Jarvis; Wales
2018 Gold Coast	Kyle Chalmers; Australia	Mack Horton; Australia	Duncan Scott; Scotland
2022 Birmingham	Duncan Scott; Scotland	Tom Dean; England	Elijah Winnington; Australia
2026 Glasgow	Kai Taylor; Australia	James Guy; England Matt Richards; Wales	not awarded

=== 400 metre freestyle ===
Games	Gold	Silver	Bronze
1970 Edinburgh	Graham White; Australia	Ralph Hutton; Canada	Greg Brough; Australia
1974 Christchurch	John Kulasalu; Australia	Brad Cooper; Australia	Steve Badger; Australia
1978 Edmonton	Ron McKeon; Australia	Simon Gray; England	Max Metzker; Australia
1982 Brisbane	Andrew Astbury; England	Peter Szmidt; Canada	John Davey; England
1986 Edinburgh	Duncan Armstrong; Australia	Kevin Boyd; England	Mike Davidson; New Zealand
1990 Auckland	Ian Brown; Australia	Glen Housman; Australia	Christopher Bowie; Canada
1994 Victoria	Kieren Perkins; Australia	Danyon Loader; New Zealand	Daniel Kowalski; Australia
1998 Kuala Lumpur	Ian Thorpe; Australia	Grant Hackett; Australia	Daniel Kowalski; Australia
2002 Manchester	Ian Thorpe; Australia	Grant Hackett; Australia	Graeme Smith; Scotland
2006 Melbourne	David Carry; Scotland	Andrew Hurd; Canada	David Davies; Wales
2010 Delhi	Ryan Cochrane; Canada	Ryan Napoleon; Australia	David Carry; Scotland
2014 Glasgow	Ryan Cochrane; Canada	David McKeon; Australia	James Guy; England
2018 Gold Coast	Mack Horton; Australia	Jack McLoughlin; Australia	James Guy; England
2022 Birmingham	Elijah Winnington; Australia	Samuel Short; Australia	Mack Horton; Australia
2026 Glasgow	Sam Short; Australia	Elijah Winnington; Australia	Ben Goedemans; Australia

=== 800 metre freestyle ===
Games	Gold	Silver	Bronze
2026 Glasgow	Sam Short; Australia	Ben Goedemans; Australia	Matthew Galea; Australia

=== 1500 metre freestyle ===
Games	Gold	Silver	Bronze
1970 Edinburgh	Graham Windeatt; Australia	Max Tavasci; Australia	Mark Treffers; New Zealand
1974 Christchurch	Stephen Holland; Australia	Mark Treffers; New Zealand	Steve Badger; Australia
1978 Edmonton	Max Metzker; Australia	Simon Gray; England	Andrew Astbury; England
1982 Brisbane	Max Metzker; Australia	Tim Ford; Australia	Andrew Astbury; England
1986 Edinburgh	Jason Plummer; Australia	Michael McKenzie; Australia	Christopher Chalmers; Canada
1990 Auckland	Glen Housman; Australia	Kieren Perkins; Australia	Michael McKenzie; Australia
1994 Victoria	Kieren Perkins; Australia	Daniel Kowalski; Australia	Glen Housman; Australia
1998 Kuala Lumpur	Grant Hackett; Australia	Ryk Neethling; South Africa	Kieren Perkins; Australia
2002 Manchester	Grant Hackett; Australia	Graeme Smith; Scotland	Craig Stevens; Australia
2006 Melbourne	David Davies; Wales	Andrew Hurd; Canada	Troyden Prinsloo; South Africa
2010 Delhi	Ryan Cochrane; Canada	Heerden Herman; South Africa	Daniel Fogg; England
2014 Glasgow	Ryan Cochrane; Canada	Mack Horton; Australia	Daniel Jervis; Wales
2018 Gold Coast	Jack McLoughlin; Australia	Daniel Jervis; Wales	Mack Horton; Australia
2022 Birmingham	Samuel Short; Australia	Daniel Wiffen; Northern Ireland	Luke Turley; England
2026 Glasgow	Samuel Short; Australia	Daniel Wiffen; Northern Ireland	Ben Goedemans; Australia

=== 50 metre backstroke ===
Games	Gold	Silver	Bronze
2002 Manchester	Matt Welsh; Australia	Alex Lim; Malaysia	Gerhard Zandberg; South Africa
2006 Melbourne	Matthew Clay; England	Liam Tancock; England	Gerhard Zandberg; South Africa
2010 Delhi	Liam Tancock; England	Hayden Stoeckel; Australia	Ashley Delaney; Australia
2014 Glasgow	Ben Treffers; Australia	Mitch Larkin; Australia	Liam Tancock; England
2018 Gold Coast	Mitch Larkin; Australia	Ben Treffers; Australia	Zac Incerti; Australia
2022 Birmingham	Andrew Jeffcoat; New Zealand	Pieter Coetze; South Africa	Javier Acevedo; Canada
2026 Glasgow	Pieter Coetze; South Africa	Oliver Morgan; England	Ruard van Renen; South Africa

=== 100 metre backstroke ===
Games	Gold	Silver	Bronze
1970 Edinburgh	Bill Kennedy; Canada	Michael Richards; Wales	Erik Fish; Canada
1974 Christchurch	Mark Tonelli; Australia	Steve Pickell; Canada	Brad Cooper; Australia
1978 Edmonton	Glenn Patching; Australia	Gary Abraham; England	Jay Tapp; Canada
1982 Brisbane	Mike West; Canada	Cameron Henning; Canada	Wade Flemons; Canada
1986 Edinburgh	Mark Tewksbury; Canada	Paul Kingsman; New Zealand	Mike West; Canada
1990 Auckland	Mark Tewksbury; Canada	Gary Anderson; Canada	Paul Kingsman; New Zealand
1994 Victoria	Martin Harris; England	Steven Dewick; Australia	Adam Ruckwood; England
1998 Kuala Lumpur	Mark Versfeld; Canada	Josh Watson; Australia	Chris Renaud; Canada
2002 Manchester	Matt Welsh; Australia	Ian Thorpe; Australia	Alex Lim; Malaysia
2006 Melbourne	Liam Tancock; England	Matt Welsh; Australia	Gregor Tait; Scotland
2010 Delhi	Liam Tancock; England	Daniel Bell; New Zealand	Ashley Delaney; Australia
2014 Glasgow	Chris Walker-Hebborn; England	Mitch Larkin; Australia	Josh Beaver; Australia
2014 Glasgow	Chris Walker-Hebborn; England	Mitch Larkin; Australia	Liam Tancock; England
2018 Gold Coast	Mitch Larkin; Australia	Bradley Woodward; Australia	Markus Thormeyer; Canada
2022 Birmingham	Pieter Coetze; South Africa	Brodie Williams; England	Bradley Woodward; Australia
2026 Glasgow	Pieter Coetze; South Africa	Oliver Morgan; England	Ruard van Renen; South Africa

=== 200 metre backstroke ===
Games	Gold	Silver	Bronze
1970 Edinburgh	Michael Richards; Wales	Raymond Terrell; England	Neil Rogers; Australia
1974 Christchurch	Brad Cooper; Australia	Mark Tonelli; Australia	Robert Williams; Australia
1978 Edmonton	Gary Hurring; New Zealand	Glenn Patching; Australia	Paul Moorfoot; Australia
1982 Brisbane	Cameron Henning; Canada	David Orbell; Australia	Mike West; Canada
1986 Edinburgh	Sandy Goss; Canada	Paul Kingsman; New Zealand	Sean Murphy; Canada
1990 Auckland	Gary Anderson; Canada	Paul Kingsman; New Zealand	Kevin Draxinger; Canada
1994 Victoria	Adam Ruckwood; England	Kevin Draxinger; Canada	Scott Miller; Australia
1998 Kuala Lumpur	Mark Versfeld; Canada	Adrian Radley; Australia	Greg Hamm; Canada
2002 Manchester	James Goddard; England	Gregor Tait; Scotland	Simon Militis; England
2006 Melbourne	Gregor Tait; Scotland	George Du Rand; South Africa	Cameron Gibson; New Zealand
2010 Delhi	James Goddard; England	Gareth Kean; New Zealand	Ashley Delaney; Australia
2014 Glasgow	Mitch Larkin; Australia	Josh Beaver; Australia	Matson Lawson; Australia
2018 Gold Coast	Mitch Larkin; Australia	Bradley Woodward; Australia	Josh Beaver; Australia
2022 Birmingham	Brodie Williams; England	Bradley Woodward; Australia	Pieter Coetze; South Africa
2026 Glasgow	Pieter Coetze; South Africa	Oliver Morgan; England	Luke Greenbank; England

=== 50 metre breaststroke ===
Games	Gold	Silver	Bronze
2002 Manchester	James Gibson; England	Adam Whitehead; England	Darren Mew; England
2006 Melbourne	Chris Cook; England	Darren Mew; England	Brenton Rickard; Australia
2010 Delhi	Cameron van der Burgh; South Africa	Glenn Snyders; New Zealand	none awarded
2010 Delhi	Cameron van der Burgh; South Africa	Brenton Rickard; Australia	none awarded
2014 Glasgow	Cameron van der Burgh; South Africa	Adam Peaty; England	Christian Sprenger; Australia
2018 Gold Coast	Cameron van der Burgh; South Africa	Adam Peaty; England	James Wilby; England
2022 Birmingham	Adam Peaty; England	Samuel Williamson; Australia	Ross Murdoch; Scotland
2026 Glasgow	Sam Williamson; Australia	Michael Houlie; South Africa	Adam Ramsay-Peaty; England

=== 100 metre breaststroke ===
Games	Gold	Silver	Bronze
1970 Edinburgh	Bill Mahony; Canada	Peter Cross; Canada	Paul Jarvie; Australia
1974 Christchurch	David Leigh; England	David Wilkie; Scotland	Paul Naisby; England
1978 Edmonton	Graham Smith; Canada	Duncan Goodhew; England	Paul Naisby; England
1982 Brisbane	Adrian Moorhouse; England	Victor Davis; Canada	Peter Evans; Australia
1986 Edinburgh	Victor Davis; Canada	Adrian Moorhouse; England	Brett Stocks; Australia
1990 Auckland	Adrian Moorhouse; England	James Parrack; England	Nick Gillingham; England
1994 Victoria	Phil Rogers; Australia	Nick Gillingham; England	Jonathan Cleveland; Canada
1998 Kuala Lumpur	Simon Cowley; Australia	Phil Rogers; Australia	Darren Mew; England
2002 Manchester	Adam Whitehead; England	Morgan Knabe; Canada	James Gibson; England
2006 Melbourne	Chris Cook; England	James Gibson; England	Brenton Rickard; Australia
2010 Delhi	Cameron van der Burgh; South Africa	Christian Sprenger; Australia	Brenton Rickard; Australia
2014 Glasgow	Adam Peaty; England	Cameron van der Burgh; South Africa	Ross Murdoch; Scotland
2018 Gold Coast	Adam Peaty; England	James Wilby; England	Cameron van der Burgh; South Africa
2022 Birmingham	James Wilby; England	Zac Stubblety-Cook; Australia	Samuel Williamson; Australia
2026 Glasgow	Sam Williamson; Australia	Filip Nowacki; Jersey	Adam Ramsay-Peaty; England

=== 200 metre breaststroke ===
Games	Gold	Silver	Bronze
1970 Edinburgh	Bill Mahony; Canada	Paul Jarvie; Australia	David Wilkie; Scotland
1974 Christchurch	David Wilkie; Scotland	David Leigh; England	Paul Naisby; England
1978 Edmonton	Graham Smith; Canada	Duncan Goodhew; England	Lindsay Spencer; Australia
1982 Brisbane	Victor Davis; Canada	Glenn Beringen; Australia	Adrian Moorhouse; England
1986 Edinburgh	Adrian Moorhouse; England	Victor Davis; Canada	Nick Gillingham; England
1990 Auckland	Jonathan Cleveland; Canada	Rodney Lawson; Australia	Nick Gillingham; England
1994 Victoria	Nick Gillingham; England	Phil Rogers; Australia	Jonathan Cleveland; Canada
1998 Kuala Lumpur	Simon Cowley; Australia	Ryan Mitchell; Australia	Adam Whitehead; England
2002 Manchester	Jim Piper; Australia	Terence Parkin; South Africa	Mike Brown; Canada
2006 Melbourne	Mike Brown; Canada	Brenton Rickard; Australia	Jim Piper; Australia
2010 Delhi	Brenton Rickard; Australia	Michael Jamieson; Scotland	Christian Sprenger; Australia
2014 Glasgow	Ross Murdoch; Scotland	Michael Jamieson; Scotland	Andrew Willis; England
2018 Gold Coast	James Wilby; England	Ross Murdoch; Scotland	Matthew Wilson; Australia
2022 Birmingham	Zac Stubblety-Cook; Australia	James Wilby; England	Ross Murdoch; Scotland
2026 Glasgow	Filip Nowacki; Jersey	Oliver Dawson; Canada	Zac Stubblety-Cook; Australia

=== 50 metre butterfly ===
Games	Gold	Silver	Bronze
2002 Manchester	Geoff Huegill; Australia	Roland Schoeman; South Africa	Mark Foster; England
2006 Melbourne	Roland Schoeman; South Africa	Matthew Welsh; Australia	Michael Klim; Australia
2010 Delhi	Jason Dunford; Kenya	Geoff Huegill; Australia	Roland Schoeman; South Africa
2014 Glasgow	Ben Proud; England	Roland Schoeman; South Africa	Chad le Clos; South Africa
2018 Gold Coast	Chad le Clos; South Africa	Dylan Carter; Trinidad and Tobago	Ryan Coetzee; South Africa
2022 Birmingham	Ben Proud; England	Tzen Wei Teong; Singapore	Cameron Gray; New Zealand
2026 Glasgow	Ben Armbruster; Australia	none awarded	Cameron McEvoy; Australia
2026 Glasgow	Kyle Chalmers; Australia	none awarded	Cameron McEvoy; Australia

=== 100 metre butterfly ===
Games	Gold	Silver	Bronze
1970 Edinburgh	Byron MacDonald; Canada	Tom Arusoo; Canada	Ron Jacks; Canada
1974 Christchurch	Neil Rogers; Australia	Byron MacDonald; Canada	Bruce Robertson; Canada
1978 Edmonton	Dan Thompson; Canada	John Mills; England	Bill Sawchuk; Canada
1982 Brisbane	Dan Thompson; Canada	Philip Hubble; England	Tom Ponting; Canada
1986 Edinburgh	Andy Jameson; England	Anthony Mosse; New Zealand	Tom Ponting; Canada
1990 Auckland	Andrew Baildon; Australia	Marcel Gery; Canada	Jason Cooper; Australia
1994 Victoria	Scott Miller; Australia	Stephen Clarke; Canada	Adam Pine; Australia
1998 Kuala Lumpur	Geoff Huegill; Australia	Adam Pine; Australia	Michael Klim; Australia
2002 Manchester	Geoff Huegill; Australia	Mike Mintenko; Canada	Adam Pine; Australia
2006 Melbourne	Ryan Pini; Papua New Guinea	Michael Klim; Australia	Moss Burmester; New Zealand
2010 Delhi	Geoff Huegill; Australia	Ryan Pini; Papua New Guinea; Antony James; England	None awarded
2014 Glasgow	Chad le Clos; South Africa	Joseph Schooling; Singapore	Adam Barrett; England
2018 Gold Coast	Chad le Clos; South Africa	James Guy; England	Grant Irvine; Australia
2022 Birmingham	Joshua Liendo; Canada	James Guy; England; Matthew Temple; Australia	none awarded
2026 Glasgow	Joshua Liendo; Canada	Matthew Temple; Australia	Ben Armbruster; Australia

=== 200 metre butterfly ===
Games	Gold	Silver	Bronze
1970 Edinburgh	Tom Arusoo; Canada	Martyn Woodroffe; Wales	James Findlay; Australia
1974 Christchurch	Brian Brinkley; England	Ross Seymour; Australia	John Coutts; New Zealand
1978 Edmonton	George Nagy; Canada	Claus Bredschneider; Canada	Philip Hubble; England
1982 Brisbane	Philip Hubble; England	Paul Rowe; Australia	Jon Sieben; Australia
1986 Edinburgh	Anthony Mosse; New Zealand	Tom Ponting; Canada	Nick Hodgson; England
1990 Auckland	Anthony Mosse; New Zealand	Martin Roberts; Australia	Jon Kelly; Canada
1994 Victoria	Danyon Loader; New Zealand	Scott Miller; Australia	James Hickman; England
1998 Kuala Lumpur	James Hickman; England	Bill Kirby; Australia	Stephen Parry; England
2002 Manchester	Justin Norris; Australia	Stephen Parry; England	James Hickman; England
2006 Melbourne	Moss Burmester; New Zealand	Travis Nederpelt; Australia	Joshua Krogh; Australia
2010 Delhi	Chad le Clos; South Africa	Michael Rock; England	Stefan Hirniak; Canada
2014 Glasgow	Chad le Clos; South Africa	Grant Irvine; Australia	Sebastien Rousseau; South Africa
2018 Gold Coast	Chad le Clos; South Africa	David Morgan; Australia	Duncan Scott; Scotland
2022 Birmingham	Lewis Clareburt; New Zealand	Chad Le Clos; South Africa	James Guy; England
2026 Glasgow	Lewis Clareburt; New Zealand	Harrison Turner; Australia	Matthew Temple; Australia

=== 200 metre individual medley ===
Games	Gold	Silver	Bronze
1970 Edinburgh	George Smith; Canada	Ken Campbell; Canada	Martyn Woodroffe; Wales
1974 Christchurch	David Wilkie; Scotland	Brian Brinkley; England	Gary MacDonald; Canada
1978 Edmonton	Graham Smith; Canada	Bill Sawchuk; Canada	Peter Dawson; Australia
1982 Brisbane	Alex Baumann; Canada	Robin Brew; Scotland	Jeffrey Sheehan; Canada
1986 Edinburgh	Alex Baumann; Canada	Rob Woodhouse; Australia	Neil Cochran; Scotland
1990 Auckland	Gary Anderson; Canada	Robert Bruce; Australia	Martin Roberts; Australia
1994 Victoria	Matthew Dunn; Australia	Curtis Myden; Canada	Fraser Walker; Scotland
1998 Kuala Lumpur	Matthew Dunn; Australia	James Hickman; England	Robert van der Zant; Australia
2002 Manchester	Justin Norris; Australia	Adrian Turner; England	James Goddard; England
2006 Melbourne	Gregor Tait; Scotland	Dean Kent; New Zealand	Brian Johns; Canada
2010 Delhi	James Goddard; England	Joseph Roebuck; England	Leith Brodie; Australia
2014 Glasgow	Daniel Tranter; Australia	Dan Wallace; Scotland	Chad le Clos; South Africa
2018 Gold Coast	Mitch Larkin; Australia	Duncan Scott; Scotland	Clyde Lewis; Australia
2022 Birmingham	Duncan Scott; Scotland	Tom Dean; England	Lewis Clareburt; New Zealand
2026 Glasgow	Duncan Scott; Scotland	Lewis Clareburt; New Zealand	Tom Dean; England

=== 400 metre individual medley ===
Games	Gold	Silver	Bronze
1970 Edinburgh	George Smith; Canada	Raymond Terrell; England	James Findlay; Australia
1974 Christchurch	Mark Treffers; New Zealand	Brian Brinkley; England	Raymond Terrell; England
1978 Edmonton	Graham Smith; Canada	Simon Gray; England	Bill Sawchuk; Canada
1982 Brisbane	Alex Baumann; Canada	Stephen Poulter; England	John Davey; England
1986 Edinburgh	Alex Baumann; Canada	Rob Woodhouse; Australia	Stephen Poulter; England
1990 Auckland	Robert Bruce; Australia	Rob Woodhouse; Australia	Jon Kelly; Canada
1994 Victoria	Matthew Dunn; Australia	Curtis Myden; Canada	Philip Bryant; Australia
1998 Kuala Lumpur	Trent Steed; Australia	James Hickman; England	Zane King; Australia
2002 Manchester	Justin Norris; Australia	Brian Johns; Canada	Adrian Turner; England
2006 Melbourne	David Carry; Scotland	Euan Dale; Scotland	Travis Nederpelt; Australia
2010 Delhi	Chad le Clos; South Africa	Joseph Roebuck; England	Riaan Schoeman; South Africa
2014 Glasgow	Dan Wallace; Scotland	Thomas Fraser-Holmes; Australia	Sebastien Rousseau; South Africa
2018 Gold Coast	Clyde Lewis; Australia	Mark Szaranek; Scotland	Lewis Clareburt; New Zealand
2022 Birmingham	Lewis Clareburt; New Zealand	Brendon Smith; Australia	Duncan Scott; Scotland
2026 Glasgow	Lewis Clareburt; New Zealand	William Petric; Australia	Lorne Wigginton; Canada

=== 4×100 metre freestyle relay ===
Games	Gold	Silver	Bronze
1970 Edinburgh	Australia; Graham White; Greg Rogers; Michael Wenden; William Devenish	Canada; George Smith; Ralph Hutton; Robert Kasting; Ron Jacks	England; Tony Jarvis; Ivan Myall; Malcolm Windeatt; Raymond Terrell
1974 Christchurch	Canada; Brian Phillips; Bruce Robertson; Gary MacDonald; Ian MacKenzie	Australia; Michael Wenden; Neil Rogers; Peter Coughlan; Ross Patterson	England; Brian Brinkley; Colin Cunningham; Keith Walton; Raymond Terrell
1978 Edmonton	Canada; Bill Sawchuk; Gary MacDonald; Graham Smith; Peter Szmidt	Australia; Glenn Patching; Graeme Brewer; Mark Morgan; Ron McKeon	England; David Dunne; Kevin Burns; Martin Smith; Richard Burrell
1982 Brisbane	Australia; Greg Fasala; Michael Delany; Graeme Brewer; Neil Brooks	England; David Lowe; Philip Hubble; Philip Osborn; Richard Burrell	Canada; Alex Baumann; Blair Hicken; Graham Welbourn; Peter Szmidt
1986 Edinburgh	Australia; Greg Fasala; Matthew Renshaw; Mark Stockwell; Neil Brooks	Canada; Vlastimil Černý; Sandy Goss; Blair Hicken; Alex Baumann	England; Andy Jameson; Mark Foster; Geoffrey Stewart; Roland Lee
1990 Auckland	Australia; Andrew Baildon; Chris Fydler; Ian Vander-Wal; Jason Cooper	England; Austyn Shortman; Mark Foster; Mike Fibbens; Neil Metcalfe	Canada; Blair Hicken; Darren Ward; Marcel Gery; Stephane Herbert
1994 Victoria	Australia; Andrew Baildon; Chris Fydler; Darren Lange; Dwade Sheehan	New Zealand; Danyon Loader; John Steel; Nicholas Tongue; Trent Bray	England; Andrew Clayton; Mark Foster; Mike Fibbens; Nicholas Shackell
1998 Kuala Lumpur	Australia; Ashley Callus; Chris Fydler; Ian Thorpe; Michael Klim	Canada; Craig Hutchison; Garret Pulle; Robbie Taylor; Stephen Clarke	England; Anthony Howard; Gavin Meadows; Mark Stevens; Nicholas Shackell
2002 Manchester	Australia; Ashley Callus; Todd Pearson; Grant Hackett; Ian Thorpe	South Africa; Roland Schoeman; Hendrik Odendaal; Lyndon Ferns; Ryk Neethling	Canada; Brent Hayden; Craig Hutchison; Matthew Rose; Rick Say
2006 Melbourne	South Africa; Roland Schoeman; Lyndon Ferns; Gerhard Zandberg; Ryk Neethling	Australia; Michael Klim; Eamon Sullivan; Brett Hawke; Ashley Callus	Canada; Yannick Lupien; Matthew Rose; Colin Russell; Brent Hayden
2010 Delhi	Australia; Kyle Richardson; Eamon Sullivan; Tommaso D'Orsogna; James Magnussen	England; Adam Brown; Simon Burnett; Ross Davenport; Grant Turner	South Africa; Gideon Louw; Graeme Moore; Roland Schoeman; Darian Townsend
2014 Glasgow	Australia; Tommaso D'Orsogna; Matthew Abood; James Magnussen; Cameron McEvoy	South Africa; Chad le Clos; Roland Schoeman; Leith Shankland; Caydon Muller	England; Adam Brown; James Disney-May; Adam Barrett; Ben Proud
2018 Gold Coast	Australia; Cameron McEvoy; James Magnussen; Jack Cartwright; Kyle Chalmers	England; David Cumberlidge; Ben Proud; Jarvis Parkinson; Elliot Clogg	Scotland; Duncan Scott; Jack Thorpe; Kieran McGuckin; Stephen Milne
2022 Birmingham	Australia; Flynn Southam; Zac Incerti; William Yang; Kyle Chalmers	England; Lewis Burras; Jacob Whittle; James Guy; Tom Dean	Canada; Joshua Liendo; Ruslan Gaziev; Finlay Knox; Javier Acevedo
2026 Glasgow	Australia; Flynn Southam; Kai Taylor; Harrison Turner; Kyle Chalmers; Edward Sommerville; Matthew Temple; William Petric; Jamie Jack	England; Jacob Mills; James Guy; Gabriel Shepherd; Jacob Whittle; Edward Mildred; Cameron Brooker; Oliver Morgan; Tom Dean	South Africa; Pieter Coetze; Guy Brooks; Ruard van Renen; Chad le Clos; Kris Mihaylov

=== 4×200 metre freestyle relay ===
Games	Gold	Silver	Bronze
1970 Edinburgh	Australia; Graham White; Greg Rogers; Michael Wenden; William Devenish	Canada; George Smith; Ralph Hutton; Robert Kasting; Ron Jacks	England; Tony Jarvis; Ivan Myall; John Mills; Raymond Terrell
1974 Christchurch	Australia; John Kulasalu; Michael Wenden; Robert Nay; Steve Badger	England; Brian Brinkley; Colin Cunningham; Neil Dexter; Raymond Terrell	Canada; Bruce Robertson; Gary MacDonald; Ian MacKenzie; Jim Fowlie
1978 Edmonton	Australia; Graeme Brewer; Mark Morgan; Max Metzker; Ron McKeon	Canada; Bill Sawchuk; Dennis Corcoran; Peter Szmidt; Robert Baylis	England; David Dunne; Martin Smith; Philip Hubble; Simon Gray
1982 Brisbane	Australia; Graeme McGufficke; Ron McKeon; Paul Rowe; Graeme Brewer	England; Philip Osborn; John Davey; Philip Hubble; Andrew Astbury	Scotland; Douglas Campbell; Neil Cochran; Graeme Wilson; Paul Easter
1986 Edinburgh	Australia; Duncan Armstrong; Peter Dale; Roberto Gleria; Thomas Stachewicz	Canada; Paul Szekula; Sandy Goss; Scott Flowers; Tom Ponting	England; John Davey; Jonathan Broughton; Kevin Boyd; Paul Howe
1990 Auckland	Australia; Gary Lord; Ian Brown; Martin Roberts; Thomas Stachewicz	Canada; Edward Parenti; Gary Vandermeulen; Jon Kelly; Turlough O'Hare	New Zealand; Anthony Mosse; John Steel; Richard Tapper; Ross Anderson
1994 Victoria	Australia; Glen Housman; Kieren Perkins; Martin Roberts; Matthew Dunn	New Zealand; Danyon Loader; Guy Callaghan; John Steel; Trent Bray	England; Andrew Clayton; James Salter; Nicholas Shackell; Steven Mellor
1998 Kuala Lumpur	Australia; Daniel Kowalski; Ian Thorpe; Matthew Dunn; Michael Klim	England; Andrew Clayton; Gavin Meadows; James Salter; Mark Stevens	New Zealand; Danyon Loader; John Davis; Scott Cameron; Trent Bray
2002 Manchester	Australia; Grant Hackett; Leon Dunne; Jason Cram; Ian Thorpe	Canada; Rick Say; Brian Johns; Mark Johnston; Mike Mintenko	England; Adam Faulkner; James Salter; Stephen Parry; Simon Burnett
2006 Melbourne	England; Simon Burnett; Alexander Scotcher; Dean Milwain; Ross Davenport	Scotland; David Carry; Euan Dale; Andrew Hunter; Robert Renwick	Australia; Nick Ffrost; Kenrick Monk; Andrew Mewing; Joshua Krogh
2010 Delhi	Australia; Thomas Fraser-Holmes; Nick Ffrost; Ryan Napoleon; Kenrick Monk	Scotland; Andrew Hunter; David Carry; Jak Scott; Robert Renwick	South Africa; Jean Basson; Darian Townsend; Jan Venter; Chad le Clos
2014 Glasgow	Australia; Cameron McEvoy; David McKeon; Ned McKendry; Thomas Fraser-Holmes	Scotland; Dan Wallace; Stephen Milne; Duncan Scott; Robert Renwick	South Africa; Myles Brown; Chad le Clos; Sebastien Rousseau; Dylan Bosch
2018 Gold Coast	Australia; Alexander Graham; Kyle Chalmers; Elijah Winnington; Mack Horton	England; Cameron Kurle; Nicholas Grainger; Jarvis Parkinson; James Guy	Scotland; Stephen Milne; Duncan Scott; Dan Wallace; Mark Szaranek
2022 Birmingham	Australia; Elijah Winnington; Flynn Southam; Zac Incerti; Mack Horton	England; James Guy; Jacob Whittle; Joe Litchfield; Tom Dean	Scotland; Stephen Milne; Evan Jones; Mark Szaranek; Duncan Scott
2026 Glasgow	Australia; Samuel Short; Harrison Turner; Edward Sommerville; Kai Taylor; William Petric; Brendon Smith; Elijah Winnington	England; Gabriel Shepherd; Thomas Dean; James Guy; Max Litchfield; Cameron Brooker; Jacob Whittle; Jacob Mills	Wales; Matt Richards; Dan Jones; Kieran Bird; Tyler Melbourne-Smith; Harry Milne; Jack Knight; Lewis Fraser

=== 4×100 metre medley relay ===
Games	Gold	Silver	Bronze
1970 Edinburgh	Canada; Byron MacDonald; Robert Kasting; Bill Mahony; Bill Kennedy	Australia; James Findlay; Michael Wenden; Neil Rogers; Paul Jarvie	Wales; Kevin Moran; Martin Richards; Martyn Woodroffe; Nigel Johnson
1974 Christchurch	Canada; Brian Phillips; Bruce Robertson; Steve Pickell; Bill Mahony	Australia; Mark Tonelli; Michael Wenden; Neil Rogers; Nigel Cluer	England; Brian Brinkley; Colin Cunningham; David Leigh; Stephen Nash
1978 Edmonton	Canada; Bill Sawchuk; Dan Thompson; Graham Smith; Jay Tapp	England; Duncan Goodhew; Gary Abraham; John Mills; Martin Smith	Australia; Glenn Patching; Graeme Brewer; Lindsay Spencer; Mark Morgan
1982 Brisbane	Australia; David Orbell; Peter Evans; Jon Sieben; Neil Brooks	England; Stephen Harrison; Adrian Moorhouse; Philip Hubble; David Lowe	Scotland; Douglas Campbell; Iain Campbell; William McGoldrick; Paul Easter
1986 Edinburgh	Canada; Mark Tewksbury; Victor Davis; Tom Ponting; Alex Baumann	England; Neil Harper; Adrian Moorhouse; Andy Jameson; Roland Lee	Australia; Carl Wilson; Brett Stocks; Barry Armstrong; Greg Fasala
1990 Auckland	Canada; Jonathan Cleveland; Marcel Gery; Mark Tewksbury; Tom Ponting	England; Adrian Moorhouse; Austyn Shortman; Gary Binfield; Mike Fibbens	Australia; Andrew Baildon; Chris Fydler; Phil Rogers; Thomas Stachewicz
1994 Victoria	Australia; Chris Fydler; Phil Rogers; Scott Miller; Steven Dewick	Canada; Chris Renaud; Jonathan Cleveland; Rob Braknis; Stephen Clarke	England; James Hickman; Martin Harris; Nick Gillingham; Nicholas Shackell
1998 Kuala Lumpur	Australia; Josh Watson; Geoff Huegill; Simon Cowley; Michael Klim	England; Darren Mew; Gavin Meadows; James Hickman; Martin Harris	Canada; Andrew Chan; Chris Sawbridge; Craig Hutchison; Garret Pulle
2002 Manchester	Australia; Matt Welsh; Jim Piper; Geoff Huegill; Ian Thorpe	England; Adam Ruckwood; Adam Whitehead; James Hickman; Matthew Kidd	Canada; Riley Janes; Morgan Knabe; Mike Mintenko; Brent Hayden
2006 Melbourne	Australia; Matt Welsh; Brenton Rickard; Michael Klim; Eamon Sullivan	England; Liam Tancock; Chris Cook; Matthew Bowe; Ross Davenport	Scotland; Gregor Tait; Kristopher Gilchrist; Todd Cooper; Craig Houston
2010 Delhi	Australia; Ashley Delaney; Brenton Rickard; Geoff Huegill; Eamon Sullivan	South Africa; Charl Crous; Cameron van der Burgh; Chad le Clos; Gideon Louw	England; Liam Tancock; Daniel Sliwinski; Antony James; Simon Burnett
2014 Glasgow	England; Chris Walker-Hebborn; Adam Peaty; Adam Barrett; Adam Brown	Australia; Mitch Larkin; Christian Sprenger; Jayden Hadler; James Magnussen	South Africa; Sebastien Rousseau; Cameron van der Burgh; Chad le Clos; Leith Shankland
2018 Gold Coast	Australia; Mitch Larkin; Jake Packard; Grant Irvine; Kyle Chalmers	England; Luke Greenbank; Adam Peaty; James Guy; Ben Proud	South Africa; Calvyn Justus; Cameron van der Burgh; Chad le Clos; Brad Tandy
2022 Birmingham	England; Brodie Williams; James Wilby; James Guy; Tom Dean	Australia; Bradley Woodward; Zac Stubblety-Cook; Matthew Temple; Kyle Chalmers	Scotland; Craig McNally; Ross Murdoch; Duncan Scott; Evan Jones
2026 Glasgow	Australia; Henry Allan; Samuel Williamson; Matthew Temple; Flynn Southam; Isaac Cooper; Zac Stubblety-Cook; Ben Armbruster; Jamie Jack	England; Oliver Morgan; Adam Ramsay-Peaty; Edward Mildred; Jacob Mills; Luke Greenbank; Gregory Butler; Jacob Peters; Jacob Whittle	South Africa; Pieter Coetze; Michael Houlie; Chad le Clos; Ruard van Renen; Chris Smith; Jarden Eaton; Guy Brooks

== Mixed events ==
=== 4 x 100 metre mixed freestyle relay ===
Games	Gold	Silver	Bronze
2022 Birmingham; Details	Australia; William Yang; Kyle Chalmers; Mollie O'Callaghan; Emma McKeon; Flynn Southam; Zac Incerti; Meg Harris; Madison Wilson	England; Lewis Burras; Tom Dean; Anna Hopkin; Freya Anderson; Edward Mildred; Jacob Whittle; Isabella Hindley; Abbie Wood	Canada; Javier Acevedo; Joshua Liendo; Rebecca Smith; Maggie Mac Neil; Ruslan Gaziev; Stephen Calkins; Ella Jansen; Mary-Sophie Harvey
2026 Glasgow; Details	Australia; Flynn Southam; Kyle Chalmers; Shayna Jack; Meg Harris; Kai Taylor; Harrison Turner; Hannah Casey; Alexandria Perkins	England; Jacob Mills; Jacob Whittle; Freya Anderson; Freya Colbert; Gabriel Shephard; Tom Dean; Abbie Wood; Erin Little	Wales; Matt Richards; Dan Jones; Bex Sutton; Theodora Taylor; Harry Milne; Kieran Bird; Medi Harris; Meghan Higgs

=== 4x100 metre mixed medley relay ===
Games	Gold	Silver	Bronze
2022 Birmingham; Details	Australia; Kaylee McKeown; Zac Stubblety-Cook; Matthew Temple; Emma McKeon; Mitch Larkin; Samuel Williamson; Alex Perkins; Madison Wilson	Canada; Kylie Masse; James Dergousoff; Maggie Mac Neil; Ruslan Gaziev; Javier Acevedo; Sophie Angus; Patrick Hussey; Rebecca Smith	England; Lauren Cox; James Wilby; James Guy; Freya Anderson; Alicia Wilson; Greg Butler; Edward Mildred; Abbie Wood
2026 Glasgow; Details	Australia; Iona Anderson; Sam Williamson; Matthew Temple; Meg Harris; Brittany Castelluzzo; Hannah Fredericks; Harrison Turner	South Africa; Pieter Coetze; Michael Houlie; Erin Gallagher; Aimee Canny; Chad le Clos; Georgia Nel; Hannah Pearse; Chris Smith	Scotland; Matthew Ward; Angharad Evans; Keanna Macinnes; Duncan Scott; Dean Fearn; Lucy Grieve; Joshua Mitchell; Emma Wood

== Paraswimming events ==
=== 50 metre freestyle S7 ===
Games	Gold	Silver	Bronze
2018 Gold Coast	Matthew Levy; Australia	Christian Sadie; South Africa	Toh Wei Soong; Singapore
2022 Birmingham	Matthew Levy; Australia	Toh Wei Soong; Singapore	Christian Sadie; South Africa
2026 Glasgow	Christian Sadie; South Africa	Toh Wei Soong; Singapore	Bruce Dee; England

=== 50 metre freestyle S9 ===
Games	Gold	Silver	Bronze
2010 Delhi	Matthew Cowdrey; Australia	Simon Miller; England	Prasanta Karmakar; India

=== 50 metre freestyle S13 ===
Games	Gold	Silver	Bronze
2022 Birmingham	Nicolas-Guy Turbide; Canada	Stephen Clegg; Scotland	Jacob Templeton; Australia
2026 Glasgow	Stephen Clegg; Scotland	Nathan Hendricks; South Africa	Nicolas-Guy Turbide; Canada

=== 100 metre freestyle S8 ===
Games	Gold	Silver	Bronze
2010 Delhi	Ben Austin; Australia	Sean Fraser; Scotland	Blake Cochrane; Australia

=== 100 metre freestyle S9 ===
Games	Gold	Silver	Bronze
1994 Victoria	Andrew Haley; Canada	Brendan Burkett; Australia	Sean Tretheway; New Zealand
2014 Glasgow	Rowan Crothers; Australia	Matthew Cowdrey; Australia	Brenden Hall; Australia
2018 Gold Coast	Timothy Disken; Australia	Lewis White; England	Brenden Hall; Australia

=== 100 metre freestyle S10 ===
Games	Gold	Silver	Bronze
2010 Delhi	Benoît Huot; Canada	Andrew Pasterfield; Australia	Robert Welbourn; England

=== 100 metre freestyle S13 ===
Games	Gold	Silver	Bronze
2026 Glasgow	Stephen Clegg; Scotland	Nathan Hendricks; South Africa	Nicolas-Guy Turbide; Canada

=== 200 metre freestyle S14 ===
Games	Gold	Silver	Bronze
2014 Glasgow	Daniel Fox; Australia	Thomas Hamer; England	Jack Thomas; Wales
2018 Gold Coast	Thomas Hamer; England	Liam Schluter; Australia	Daniel Fox; Australia
2022 Birmingham	Nicholas Bennett; Canada	Benjamin Hance; Australia	Jack Ireland; Australia
2026 Glasgow	William Ellard; England	Jack Ireland; Australia	Rhys Darbey; Wales

=== 100 metre backstroke S9 ===
Games	Gold	Silver	Bronze
2018 Gold Coast	Brenden Hall; Australia	Timothy Hodge; Australia	Logan Powell; Australia
2022 Birmingham	Timothy Hodge; Australia	Jesse Reynolds; New Zealand	Barry McClements; Northern Ireland
2026 Glasgow	Timothy Hodge; Australia	Barry McClements; Northern Ireland	Harrison Vig; Australia

=== 100 metre breaststroke SB8 ===
Games	Gold	Silver	Bronze
2018 Gold Coast	Timothy Disken; Australia	Timothy Hodge; Australia	Blake Cochrane; Australia
2022 Birmingham	Joshua Willmer; New Zealand	Timothy Hodge; Australia	Blake Cochrane; Australia

=== 100 metre breaststroke SB9 ===
Games	Gold	Silver	Bronze
2026 Glasgow	Beau Matthews; Australia	Joshua Willmer; New Zealand	Timothy Hodge; Australia

=== 100 metre butterfly S10 ===
Games	Gold	Silver	Bronze
2022 Birmingham	Col Pearse; Australia	Alex Saffy; Australia	James Hollis; England
2026 Glasgow	Alex Saffy; Australia	Col Pearse; Australia	Jack Gill; Canada

=== 200 m individual medley SM8 ===
Games	Gold	Silver	Bronze
2014 Glasgow	Oliver Hynd; England	Jesse Aungles; Australia	Blake Cochrane; Australia
2018 Gold Coast	Jesse Aungles; Australia	Blake Cochrane; Australia	Philippe Vachon; Canada

== Discontinued events ==
=== 100 yard freestyle ===
Games	Gold	Silver	Bronze
1930 Hamilton	Munroe Bourne; Canada	Norman Brooks; England	Bert Gibson; Canada
1934 London	George Burleigh; Canada	George Larson; Canada	Noel Crump; New Zealand

=== 110 yard freestyle ===
Games	Gold	Silver	Bronze
1938 Sydney	Bob Pirie; Canada	Terry Collard; South Africa	William Fleming; Australia
1950 Auckland	Peter Salmon; Canada	Frank O'Neill; Australia	Pat Kendall; England
1954 Vancouver	Jon Henricks; Australia	Cyrus Weld; Australia	Rex Aubrey; Australia
1958 Cardiff	John Devitt; Australia	Gary Chapman; Australia	Geoff Shipton; Australia
1962 Perth	Dick Pound; Canada	Bob McGregor; Scotland	David Dickson; Australia
1966 Kingston	Michael Wenden; Australia	Bob McGregor; Scotland	David Dickson; Australia

=== 400 yard freestyle ===
Games	Gold	Silver	Bronze
1930 Hamilton	Noel Ryan; Australia	Gordon Bridson; New Zealand	George Burleigh; Canada

=== 440 yard freestyle ===
Games	Gold	Silver	Bronze
1934 London	Noel Ryan; Australia	Norman Wainwright; England	Bob Pirie; Canada
1938 London	Bob Pirie; Canada	Bob Leivers; England	Robin Biddulph; Australia
1950 Auckland	Garrick Agnew; Australia	Graham Johnston; South Africa	Buddy Lucas; New Zealand
1954 Vancouver	Gary Chapman; Australia	Jack Wardrop; Scotland	Graham Johnston; South Africa
1958 Cardiff	John Konrads; Australia	Ian Black; Scotland	Gary Winram; Australia
1962 Perth	Murray Rose; Australia	Allan Wood; Australia	Bob Windle; Australia
1966 Kingston	Bob Windle; Australia	John Bennett; Australia	Ralph Hutton; Canada

=== 1500 yard freestyle ===
Games	Gold	Silver	Bronze
1930 Hamilton	Noel Ryan; Australia	Gordon Bridson; New Zealand	George Burleigh; Canada
1934 London	Noel Ryan; Australia	Bob Pirie; Canada	Norman Wainwright; England

=== 1650 yard freestyle ===
Games	Gold	Silver	Bronze
1938 London	Bob Leivers; England	Bob Pirie; Canada	Norman Wainwright; England
1950 Auckland	Graham Johnston; South Africa	Jim Portelance; Canada	Buddy Lucas; New Zealand
1954 Vancouver	Graham Johnston; South Africa	Peter Duncan; South Africa	Gary Chapman; Australia
1958 Cardiff	John Konrads; Australia	Gary Winram; Australia	Murray McLachlan; South Africa
1962 Perth	Murray Rose; Australia	Bob Windle; Australia	Allan Wood; Australia
1966 Kingston	Ron Jackson; Australia	Sandy Gilchrist; Canada	Ralph Hutton; Canada

=== 100 yard backstroke ===
Games	Gold	Silver	Bronze
1930 Hamilton	Bill Trippett; England	Willie Francis; Scotland	John Besford; England
1934 London	Willie Francis; Scotland	John Besford; England	Ben Gazell; Canada

=== 110 yard backstroke ===
Games	Gold	Silver	Bronze
1938 London	Percy Oliver; Australia	Gordon Kerr; Canada	Micky Taylor; England
1950 Auckland	Jackie Wiid; South Africa	John Brockway; Wales	Bert Kinnear; Scotland
1954 Vancouver	John Brockway; Wales	Lincoln Hurring; New Zealand	Cyrus Weld; Australia
1958 Cardiff	John Monckton; Australia	John Hayres; Australia	Bob Wheaton; Canada
1962 Perth	Graham Sykes; England	Julian Carroll; Australia	Wayne Vincent; Australia
1966 Kingston	Peter Reynolds; Australia	Ralph Hutton; Canada	Neil Jackson; England

=== 220 yard backstroke ===
Games	Gold	Silver	Bronze
1962 Perth	Julian Carroll; Australia	Tony Fingleton; Australia	Alan Robertson; New Zealand
1966 Kingston	Peter Reynolds; Australia	Ralph Hutton; Canada	Karl Byrom; Australia

=== 110 yard breaststroke ===
Games	Gold	Silver	Bronze
1962 Perth	Ian O'Brien; Australia	William Burton; Australia	Steve Rabinovitch; Canada
1966 Kingston	Ian O'Brien; Australia	Tony Graham; New Zealand	Malcolm Tucker; England

=== 200 yard breaststroke ===
Games	Gold	Silver	Bronze
1930 Hamilton	Jack Aubin; Canada	Stanley Bell; England	Reginald Flint; England
1934 London	Norman Hamilton; Scotland	William McCarty; Jamaica	Bill Puddy; Canada

=== 220 yard breaststroke ===
Games	Gold	Silver	Bronze
1938 London	Goldup Davies; England	Walter Spence; British Guiana	Jimmy Prentice; Canada
1950 Auckland	David Hawkins; Australia	Roy Romain; England	Ron Sharpe; Australia
1954 Vancouver	Jack Doms; New Zealand	Peter Jervis; England	Alan Hime; England
1958 Cardiff	Terry Gathercole; Australia	Peter Rocchi; South Africa	Christopher Walkden; England
1962 Perth	Ian O'Brien; Australia	William Burton; Australia	Neil Nicholson; England
1966 Kingston	Ian O'Brien; Australia	Tony Graham; New Zealand	Bill Mahony; Canada

=== 110 yard butterfly ===
Games	Gold	Silver	Bronze
1962 Perth	Kevin Berry; Australia	Neville Hayes; Australia	Aldwin Meinhardt; Canada
1966 Kingston	Ron Jacks; Canada	Graham Dunn; Australia	Keith Bewley; England

=== 220 yard butterfly ===
Games	Gold	Silver	Bronze
1958 Cardiff	Ian Black; Scotland	Graham Symonds; England	Brian Wilkinson; Australia
1962 Perth	Kevin Berry; Australia	Neville Hayes; Australia	Brett Hill; Australia
1966 Kingston	Dave Gerrard; New Zealand	Brett Hill; Australia	Tom Arusoo; Canada

=== 440 yard individual medley ===
Games	Gold	Silver	Bronze
1962 Perth	Alex Alexander; Australia	John Oravainen; Australia	John Kelso; Canada
1966 Kingston	Peter Reynolds; Australia	Ralph Hutton; Canada	Sandy Gilchrist; Canada

=== 4×110 yard freestyle relay ===
Games	Gold	Silver	Bronze
1962 Perth	Australia; David Dickson; Murray Rose; Peter Doak; Peter Phelps	Canada; Aldwin Meinhardt; Sandy Gilchrist; Jack Kelso; Dick Pound	England; Rodney Clayden; John Martin-Dye; Peter Kendrew; Stanley Clarke
1966 Kingston	Australia; David Dickson; John Ryan; Michael Wenden; Bob Windle	Canada; Sandy Gilchrist; Ralph Hutton; Robert Kasting; Ron Jacks	England; Tony Jarvis; John Martin-Dye; Michael Turner; Bob Lord

=== 4×200 yard freestyle relay ===
Games	Gold	Silver	Bronze
1930 Hamilton	Canada; Bert Gibson; Munroe Bourne; George Burleigh; James Thompson	England; Frederick Milton; Norman Brooks; Arthur Watts; Joseph Whiteside	none awarded
1934 London	Canada; George Larson; George Burleigh; Robert Hooper; Bob Pirie	England; Mostyn Ffrench-Williams; Norman Wainwright; Reginald Sutton; Bob Leivers	Scotland; George Anderson; Henry Cunningham; Merilees Chassels; William Burns

=== 4×220 yard freestyle relay ===
Games	Gold	Silver	Bronze
1938 Sydney	England; Frederick Dove; Mostyn Ffrench-Williams; Norman Wainwright; Bob Leivers	Canada; George Burleigh; Gordon Devlin; Robert Hooper; Bob Pirie	Australia; Robert Wilshire; Noel Ryan; Robin Biddulph; William Fleming
1950 Auckland	New Zealand; Buddy Lucas; Lyall Barry; Michael Amos; Noel Chambers	Australia; Barrie Kellaway; Garrick Agnew; Frank O'Neill; James Beard	England; Donald Bland; Jack Hale; Pat Kendall; Raymond Legg
1954 Vancouver	Australia; David Hawkins; Gary Chapman; Jon Henricks; Rex Aubrey	Canada; Allen Gilchrist; George Park; Gerry McNamee; Ted Simpson	South Africa; Dennis Ford; Graham Johnston; Peter Duncan; Billy Steuart
1958 Cardiff	Australia; Gary Chapman; Brian Wilkinson; John Konrads; John Devitt	Scotland; Athole Still; Ian Black; James Leiper; Bob Sreenan	Canada; Kenneth Williams; Peter Bell; Cam Grout; William Slater
1962 Perth	Australia; Allan Wood; Anthony Strahan; Murray Rose; Bob Windle	Canada; Aldwin Meinhardt; Sandy Gilchrist; Jack Kelso; Dick Pound	England; John Martin-Dye; Peter Kendrew; Richard Campion; Stanley Clarke
1966 Kingston	Australia; David Dickson; Michael Wenden; Peter Reynolds; Bob Windle	Canada; Sandy Gilchrist; Ralph Hutton; Robert Kasting; Ron Jacks	England; Tony Jarvis; John Thurley; Keith Bewley; Michael Turner

=== 3×100 yard medley relay ===
Games	Gold	Silver	Bronze
1934 London	Canada; Ben Gazell; George Burleigh; Bill Puddy	Scotland; Merilees Chassels; Norman Hamilton; Willie Francis	England; Arthur Summers; John Besford; Mostyn Ffrench-Williams

=== 3×110 yard medley relay ===
Games	Gold	Silver	Bronze
1938 Sydney	England; Frederick Dove; Goldup Davies; Micky Taylor	Canada; Gordon Kerr; Jimmy Prentice; Bob Pirie	Australia; Ernest Hobbs; Percy Oliver; William Fleming
1950 Auckland	England; Jack Hale; Pat Kendall; Roy Romain	Canada; Allen Gilchrist; Lucien Beaumont; Peter Salmon	New Zealand; John Shanahan; Lyall Barry; Peter Mathieson
1954 Vancouver	Australia; Cyrus Weld; David Hawkins; Jon Henricks	New Zealand; Buddy Lucas; Jack Doms; Lincoln Hurring	Scotland; Jack Wardrop; John Service; Bert Wardrop

=== 4×110 yard medley relay ===
Games	Gold	Silver	Bronze
1958 Cardiff	Australia; Gary Chapman; John Monckton; John Devitt; Terry Gathercole	Canada; George Park; Kenneth Williams; Peter Bell; Bob Wheaton	England; Christopher Walkden; Graham Sykes; Graham Symonds; Neil McKechnie
1962 Perth	Australia; David Dickson; Ian O'Brien; Julian Carroll; Kevin Berry	England; Graham Sykes; Neil Nicholson; Peter Kendrew; Terry Glenville	Canada; Aldwin Meinhardt; Jack Kelso; Dick Pound; Steve Rabinovitch
1966 Kingston	Canada; Sandy Gilchrist; Leonard Chase; Ralph Hutton; Ron Jacks	England; Keith Bewley; Malcolm Tucker; Michael Turner; Neil Jackson	New Zealand; Dave Gerrard; Tony Graham; Hilton Brown; Paddy O'Carroll

== All-time medal table for Men's Swimming (1930–2014) ==
Rank	Nation	Gold	Silver	Bronze	Total
1	Australia	110	78	68	256
2	Canada	53	50	47	150
3	England	28	44	60	132
4	New Zealand	8	15	14	37
5	Scotland	7	12	9	28
6	South Africa	6	9	10	25
7	Wales	2	3	5	10
8	Guyana	0	1	0	1
8	Jamaica	0	1	0	1
8	Singapore	0	1	0	1
Totals (10 entries)		214	214	213	641

== See also ==
- List of Commonwealth Games medallists in swimming (women)
