= Scotland at the 1978 Commonwealth Games =

- CG code: SCO
- CGA: Commonwealth Games Scotland
- Website: www.teamscotland.scot

in Edmonton, Canada
- Flag bearer: Alex McIntosh
- Medals Ranked 7th: Gold 3 Silver 6 Bronze 5 Total 14

Commonwealth Games appearances (overview)
- 1930; 1934; 1938; 1950; 1954; 1958; 1962; 1966; 1970; 1974; 1978; 1982; 1986; 1990; 1994; 1998; 2002; 2006; 2010; 2014; 2018; 2022; 2026; 2030

Scotland competed at the 1978 Commonwealth Games in Edmonton, Canada, from 3 to 12 August 1978.

The Scotland team was named on 11 June 1978 and was the largest Scottish Commonwealth Games team to date, with 100 competitiors and 25 officials.

Scotland came 7th overall with 3 golds, 6 silver and 5 bronze medals.

== Medalists ==
=== Gold ===
- Alister Allan (shooting)
- Allan Wells (200 metres)
- Men's 4 × 100 metres relay (4 × 100 metres relay)

=== Silver ===
- James Douglas (boxing)
- Albert Patrick (wrestling)
- Charlie Revolta (weightlifting)
- Allan Wells (100 metres)
- Mixed doubles (badminton)
- Men's pairs (Lawn bowls)

=== Bronze ===
- Chris Black (hammer throw)
- Brian Burgess (high jump)
- Jack Hynd (weightlifting)
- Johnny McAllister (boxing)
- John Robson (1500m)

== Team ==
=== Athletics ===
Men

Athlete	Events	Club	Medals
Chris Black	hammer throw		Bronze medal
Brian Burgess	high jump		Bronze medal
James Dingwall	marathon		
Paul Forbes	800m, 4x400m relay		
Francis James Clement	1500m		
Ian William Gilmour	steeplechase		
Peter Hoffman	800m, 4x400m relay		
Allister Hutton	5000, 10,000m		
David Jenkins	4x100m relay, 400m, 4x400m relay		Gold medal
Roger Jenkins	400m, 4x400m relay		
Drew McMaster	100, 200m, 4x100m relay		Gold medal
Nat Muir	5,000m		
John Robson	1500m		Bronze medal
Cameron Sharp	100, 200m, 4 x100m relay		Gold medal
Robert Lawrence Spence	5000m		
Allan Wells	100, 200 4x100m relay		,,

Women

Athlete	Events	Club	Medals
Margaret Coomber	1500m, 4x400 relay		
Elaine Davidson	4x100 relay		
Helen Golden	100, 200m, 4x100 relay, 4x400 relay		
Ann Kay Harley	400m, 4x400 relay		
Evelyn McMeekin	800m, 4x400 relay		
Meg Ritchie	discus throw, shot put		
Diane Royle	javelin throw		
Margot Wells	200m, 4x100 relay		
Christine Whittingham	1500m		
Karen Williams	400m, 4x100 relay		

=== Badminton ===
Men

Athlete	Events	Club	Medals
Tony Dawson	singles, doubles, mixed	Aberdeen	
Billy Gilliland	singles, doubles, mixed	Greenock	Silver medal
Fraser Gow	singles, doubles, mixed	Cambs	
Dan Travers	singles, doubles, mixed	Glasgow	

Women

Athlete	Events	Club	Medals
Joanna Flockhart	doubles, mixed	Newmills	Silver medal
Pamela Hamilton	singles, doubles, mixed	Airdrie	
Anne Johnstone	singles, doubles, mixed	Whitburn	
Christine Stewart	singles, doubles, mixed	Whitburn	

=== Boxing ===
Athlete	Events	Club	Medals
Steve Cooney	67kg welterweight	Camperdown ABC, Dundee	
Jim Douglas	63.5kg light-welterweight	Camperdown ABC, Dundee	Silver medal
George Lowe	54kg bantamweight		
John McAllister	60kg lightweight	Kingston Boys' Club, Glasgow	Bronze medal
Ian McLeod	57kg featherweight		
Joseph Park	51kg flyweight		
Archibald Salmon	71kg light-middleweight		

=== Cycling ===
Athlete	Events	Club	Medal
John Clark	road race, scratch, indiv & team pursuit		
Roy Crombie	indiv & team pursuit, scratch		
Alex Gilchrist	road race		
Ian Humphreys	scratch, team pursuit		
Robert Millar	road race		
David Whitehall	road race, indiv & team pursuit		

=== Diving ===
Men

Athlete	Events	Club	Medals
Ronald Hurst	springboard, platform		
Fraser McBlane	springboard, platform		

Women

Athlete	Events	Club	Medals
Fiona Hotson	springboard, platform		

=== Gymnastics ===
Women only

Athlete	Events	Medals
Karen Forbes	all-around & team	
Catriona Macaulay	all-around & team	
Eileen Ramsay	all-around & team	
Julie Walker	all-around & team	

=== Lawn bowls ===
Athlete	Events	Club	Medals
Willie Adrain	fours	Dreghorn BC	
Dick Bernard	fours	Gorebridge BC	
Doug Copland	fours	Caledonian BC, Perth	
John Fleming	fours	Mauchline BC	
Alex McIntosh	pairs	Newbattle BC	Silver medal
David McGill	singles	Sighthill BC	
Willie Wood	pairs	Gifford BC	Silver medal

=== Shooting ===
Men

Athlete	Events	Medals
Alister Allan	rifle prone	Gold medal
Mark Campbell	trap	
Jim Dunlop	skeet	
Neil C. M. Fyfe	fullbore rifle	
Hugh Hunter	rapid fire pistol	
John Knowles	rifle prone	
James McAllister	free pistol	
Colin McEachran	fullbore rifle	
Donald Westwater	free pistol	
Donald Wynn	trap	

=== Swimming ===
Men

Athlete	Events	Club	Medals
Douglas Campbell	200m free, 100, 200m backstroke, relay		
James Carter	100, 200m backstroke		
Robert Dawson	100m free, 100m butterfly, relayx2		
Gordon Downie	100m, 200m free, relayx3		
Richard Iredale	100m free, 100m butterfly, relayx2		
Paul Marshall	200 free, 100, 200m backstroke, relayx2		
Alan McClatchey	200, 400m butterfly, relayx2		
Liam Anthony Oldershaw	100m breaststroke, 220 medley, relay		

Women

Athlete	Events	Club	Medals
Maureen Campbell	100, 200 breast		
Sandra Dickie	100 breast, 100 butt, 200 medley		
Margaret Hendry	100, 200 butt, 100 free		
Jean Hill	100, 200 breast		
Denise McPhillamy	100, 200, 400 free		
Beverley Rose	100, 200 back		

=== Weightlifting ===
Athlete	Events	Medals
John Heron Craig	60kg featherweight	
James Holland	82.5kg light-heavyweight	
Jack Hynd	+110kg super-heavyweight	Bronze medal
Robert William Kennedy	67.5kg lightweight	
John McNiven	52kg flyweight	
Charlie Revolta	52kg flyweight	Silver medal
John Rush	75kg middleweight 75kg	

=== Wrestling ===
Athlete	Events	Medals
Tam Anderson	68kg lightweight	
Thomas Burke	62kg featherweight	
Neil McKay	57kg bantamweight	
Robert McLucas	74kg welterweight	
Scott Murray	90kg light-heavyweight	
Albert Patrick	+100kg super-heavyweight	Silver medal
