= Brazendale =

Brazendale is a surname. Notable people with the surname include:

- Cheryl Brazendale (born 1963), English swimmer
- Richard Brazendale (born 1960), New Zealand cricketer
