= Debbie Rudd =

British swimmer

Personal information
- Born: 27 September 1959 (age 66) Solihull, England

Sport
- Sport: Swimming
Medal record
Women's swimming
Representing Great Britain
Universiade
Silver medal – second place	1979 Mexico City	100 m breaststroke
Silver medal – second place	1979 Mexico City	200 m breaststroke
Representing England
Commonwealth Games
Silver medal – second place	1978 Edmonton	200 m breaststroke

Debbie Rudd (born 27 September 1959) is a British former swimmer. Rudd competed at the 1976 Summer Olympics and the 1980 Summer Olympics.

She also represented England and won a silver medal in the 200 metres Breaststroke, at the 1978 Commonwealth Games in Edmonton, Alberta, Canada. She also won the 1976 ASA National Championship title in the 200 metres breaststroke.
