= Sue Jenner =

British swimmer

Personal information
- Full name: Susan Pamela Jenner
- Nickname: "Sue"
- National team: Great Britain
- Born: 26 March 1960 (age 66)
- Height: 1.62 m (5 ft 4 in)
- Weight: 53 kg (117 lb; 8.3 st)

Sport
- Sport: Swimming
- Strokes: Butterfly
- Club: Mermaid SC
Medal record
Women's swimming
Representing Great Britain
European Championships
Bronze medal – third place	1977 Jönköping	200 m butterfly
Representing England
Commonwealth Games
Bronze medal – third place	1978 Edmonton	4×100 m medley

Susan Pamela Jenner (born 26 March 1960) is a British former competition swimmer.

== Early life ==
She grew up on Deane Way in Eastcote, and attended Cannon Lane Primary School on Cannonbury Avenue. She swam with Ruislip Northwood SC at Highgrove pool.

== Swimming career ==
Jenner won a bronze medal in the 200-metre butterfly at the 1977 European Aquatics Championships. She also competed in the 4×100-metre medley relay and 100-metre butterfly at the 1976 Summer Olympics in Montreal, and finished sixth in the latter event.

She represented England in the butterfly events and won a bronze medal in the 4 x 100 metres medley relay, at the 1978 Commonwealth Games in Edmonton, Alberta, Canada. She also won the 1978 ASA National Championship title in the 100 metres butterfly and the 1977 and 1978 200 metres butterfly titles.

== Personal life ==
She married swimmer Nigel Goldsworthy in November 1990, at a castle in Scotland.
