= Kevin Welch-Kennedy =

British weightlifter

Personal information
- Nationality: English
- Born: 13 December 1952 (age 73)

Kevin P. Welch-Kennedy (born 1952), is a former weightlifter who competed for Great Britain and England.

== Weightlifting career ==
Pinsent represented Great Britain in the 1976 Summer Olympics and the 1980 Summer Olympics.

He also competed for England in the 67.5 kg lightweight division, at the 1978 Commonwealth Games in Edmonton, Alberta, Canada.
