= Marion Saunders =

British diver (born 1960)

Personal information
- Nationality: England
- Born: 1 June 1960 (age 65)

Marion Saunders (born 1960) is a female former diver who competed for Great Britain and England. Saunders represented Great Britain at the 1980 Summer Olympics. She also represented England in the 10 metres platform, at the 1978 Commonwealth Games in Christchurch, New Zealand.
