= Jay Tapp =

Personal information
- Born: Jay Grenville Tapp

Sport
- Country: Canada
- Sport: Swimming
- Event: Backstroke
Medal record
Commonwealth Games
Gold medal – first place	1978 Edmonton	4×100 m medley
Bronze medal – third place	1978 Edmonton	100 m backstroke

Jay Grenville Tapp is a Canadian former backstroke swimmer.

Tapp is the son of former Swimming Canada president Larry Tapp and the father of Olympic swimmer Jake Tapp.

At the 1978 Commonwealth Games in Edmonton, Tapp swam the backstroke leg of Canada's gold medal-winning 4 x 100 metre medley relay team and also secured a bronze medal in the 100 metre backstroke event.

Tapp swam in the 100 metre backstroke at the 1978 World Swimming Championships in West Berlin. He was due to swim in the heats of the 4 × 100 m medley relay but got sent home early by coach Don Talbot, who deemed that he and teammate George Nagy were under the influence of alcohol after they arrived back late to the hotel.
