= Helen Gilyard =

English swimmer (born 1963)

Personal information
- Nationality: England
- Born: 1961 (age 64–65) Bradford
Medal record
Women's swimming
Representing England
Commonwealth Games
Bronze medal – third place	1978 Edmonton	4×100 m medley

Helen Jane Gilyard (born 1963), is a female former swimmer who competed for England.

== Swimming career ==
Gilyard represented England and won a bronze medal in the 4 x 100 metres medley relay, at the 1978 Commonwealth Games in Edmonton, Alberta, Canada.
