= Michael Keelan =

Personal information
- Nationality: English/Australian
- Born: 1955 (age 70–71) Manchester

Michael Keelan (born 1955), is a male former weightlifter who competed for England and the CEO of the Australian Weightlifting Federation.

== Australian Weightlifting Federation ==
Keelan took over from Matthew Curtain as CEO of the Australian Weightlifting Federation on 6 November 2009. He was sacked from the position in 2012 following a controversy but was subsequently cleared of misconduct by the AWF and reinstated to his position.

== Weightlifting career ==
Keelan represented England in the 82.5 kg light-heavyweight division, at the 1978 Commonwealth Games in Edmonton, Alberta, Canada. Four years later he represented England again in the 82.5 kg light-heavyweight division, at the 1982 Commonwealth Games in Brisbane, Queensland, Australia.
