= Swimming at the 1975 Pan American Games – Women's 100 metre butterfly =

Women's 100 metre butterfly at the 1975 Pan American Games
- Venue: -
- Dates: October 21 (preliminaries and finals)
- Competitors: from - nations

Medalists
| Gold medal | Camille Wright | United States |
| Silver medal | Peggy Tosdal | United States |
| Bronze medal | Wendy Quirk | Canada |

The women's 100 metre butterfly competition of the swimming events at the 1975 Pan American Games took place on 21 October. The last Pan American Games champion was Deena Deardurff of the United States.

This race consisted of two lengths of the pool, all in butterfly.

== Results ==
All times are in minutes and seconds.

| KEY: | q | Fastest non-qualifiers | Q | Qualified | GR | Games record | NR | National record | PB | Personal best | SB | Seasonal best |

=== Final ===
The final was held on October 21.

| Rank | Name | Nationality | Time | Notes |
|---|---|---|---|---|
| 1st place, gold medalist(s) | Camille Wright | United States | 1:02.71 | |
| 2nd place, silver medalist(s) | Peggy Tosdal | United States | 1:03.37 | |
| 3rd place, bronze medalist(s) | Wendy Quirk | Canada | 1:05.07 | |
| 4 | - | - | - | |
| 5 | - | - | - | |
| 6 | Rosemary Ribeiro | Brazil | 1:05.84 | |
| 7 | Flávia Nadalutti | Brazil | 1:07.09 | |
| 8 | - | - | - | |
