= Graham Johnston (swimmer) =

South African swimmer (1930–2019)

Personal information
- Born: July 10, 1930 Bloemfontein, South Africa
- Died: July 27, 2019 (aged 89) Houston, United States

Sport
- Sport: Swimming
- College team: University of Oklahoma
Medal record
Representing South Africa
British Empire Games
Gold medal – first place	1950 Auckland	1650yd freestyle
Gold medal – first place	1954 Vancouver	1650yd freestyle
Silver medal – second place	1950 Auckland	440yd freestyle
Bronze medal – third place	1954 Vancouver	440yd freestyle
Bronze medal – third place	1954 Vancouver	4×220yd freestyle relay

Graham M. Johnston (10 July 1930 – 27 July 2019) was a South African swimmer who competed in the 1952 Summer Olympics. Johnston graduated from the University of Oklahoma and lived in the United States of America beginning in 1958. He was inducted into the International Swimming Hall of Fame in 1998 and is acknowledged worldwide as one of the greatest Masters swimmers of all time.

Johnston was born in Bloemfontein on 10 July 1930. His father, who managed a swimming pool, taught him to swim before the age of two. As a youth, he attended the Afrikaans all-boys school, Grey College. Completely comfortable in the water, Graham achieved national swimming success during his high school and college years and throughout the rest of his life. He was both South African National Junior Diving Champion and South African Junior Swimming Champion for 3 consecutive years, 1946–1948, and South African National Senior Swimming Champion, 1949–1951. He won 2 gold and 2 silver medals in each of the 1950 and 1954 Commonwealth Games held in New Zealand and Canada, and represented South Africa in the Summer Olympics of 1952 held in Helsinki, Finland.

After his Olympic performance, Graham was invited to be one of the first South African athletes to swim at an American University. He was awarded a full swimming scholarship to the University of Oklahoma where he was named an NCAA All-American for three years. Also in 1952, while a freshman, he met his future wife, Janis Kathryn Thompson, who was also a student at OU. They married in 1955 and had five children and nine grandchildren.

Graham retired from swimming in 1956, and after a brief residence in South Africa, he and Janis moved to Houston in 1962 where they raised their five children. He worked for E. L. Lester & Co. in heavy construction materials sales and later for Waukesha-Pearce, industrial equipment supplier. He was a member of the Houston Contractors Association. After being away from competitive swimming for 16 years, from 1956 to 1972, Graham returned to the sport at the age of 41 when the U. S. Masters swimming program was launched for older swimmers. He began training and competing at the Dads Club of Houston, and in 1973 swam in his first Masters National Championship in Santa Monica, CA. This success was followed over the next 46 years by national championships, national records, world records and world championships too numerous to recount.

Graham was inducted into The International Swimming Hall of Fame in 1998, the International Masters Swimming Hall of Fame in 2003, the Texas Swimming and Diving Hall of Fame in 2009, the National Senior Games Hall of Fame in 2011, and the Huntsman World Senior Games Hall of Fame in 2012. During the period while swimming in the 65-69 age bracket, he held every national record at every freestyle distance from 100 yards in the pool to the 10k open water swim. Over his career, he competed in eight FINA (Federation Internationale de Natation) Masters World Championships and won Gold 33 times. In 2017, he held 105 FINA Masters World Records, the most of any male in the world.

Graham also loved open water swimming. He won the Waikiki Rough Water Swim eight years in a row, was the oldest and fastest of all age groups to complete the Robben Island to Cape Town, South Africa swim, enjoyed the Lanai to Maui Channel relay, the Catalina Island relay, the San Francisco to Alcatraz swim and at age 74 became the oldest man to swim the Straits of Gibraltar.

Graham died in Houston, Texas on 27 July 2019, at the age of 89.

== See also ==
- List of members of the International Swimming Hall of Fame
- List of Commonwealth Games medallists in swimming (men)
