= David Dunne (swimmer) =

English swimmer (born 1955)

Personal information
- Full name: David Michael Dunne
- National team: Great Britain
- Born: 30 November 1955 (age 70)

Sport
- Sport: Swimming
- Strokes: Freestyle
- Club: Beckenham SC
Medal record
Men's swimming
Representing Great Britain
Bronze medal – third place	1976 Montreal	4×200 m freestyle
Representing England
Commonwealth Games
Bronze medal – third place	1978 Edmonton	4×100 m freestyle
Bronze medal – third place	1978 Edmonton	4×200 m freestyle

David Michael Dunne (born 30 November 1955) is an English former competitive swimmer

== Swimming career ==
He represented Great Britain at the 1976 Summer Olympics in Montreal, Canada, where he won a bronze medal as a member of the third-place British team in the men's 4x200-metre freestyle relay. At the 1978 Commonwealth Games in Edmonton, Alberta, Dunne won two more bronze medals as a member of the English teams in the 4x100-metre and 4x200-metre freestyle relay events. He also won the 1978 ASA National Championships over 200 metres freestyle.

== Personal life ==
Dunne is now a site manager at a school in the borough of Eastleigh in Hampshire but then briefly retired before coming back to the school to help out.

== See also ==
- List of Commonwealth Games medallists in swimming (men)
- List of Olympic medalists in swimming (men)
