= Kaye Lovatt =

British swimmer

Personal information
- Nationality: English
- Born: 13 April 1964 (age 62) Leeds, England
Medal record
Women's swimming
Representing England
Commonwealth Games
Silver medal – second place	1978 Edmonton	4×100 m freestyle

Kaye H Lovatt is a former British swimmer.

== Swimming career ==
Lovatt competed at the 1980 Summer Olympics in Moscow and gained a fourth-place finish in the women's 4 × 100 metres freestyle relay. She was part of the British International swimming team from 1978 until 1982 and the University of Arkansas.

She represented England and won a silver medal in the 4 × 100 metres freestyle relay, at the 1978 Commonwealth Games in Edmonton, Alberta, Canada.
