= Heidi Turk =

English swimmer (1961–2012)

Personal information
- Nationality: England
- Born: 1961 Cheltenham
- Died: 27 October 2012 (aged 51)
Medal record
Women's swimming
Representing England
Commonwealth Games
Silver medal – second place	1978 Edmonton	4×100 m freestyle

Heidi Karen Turk married name Heidi Wood (1961-2012), was a female swimmer who competed for Great Britain and England.

== Swimming career ==
Turk represented England and won a silver medal in the 4 x 100 metres freestyle relay, at the 1978 Commonwealth Games in Edmonton, Alberta, Canada.
