= Wendy Quirk =

Canadian swimmer (born 1959)

Personal information
- Full name: Wendy Quirk
- National team: Canada
- Born: May 29, 1959 (age 67) Montreal, Quebec, Canada
- Height: 1.73 m (5 ft 8 in)
- Weight: 63 kg (139 lb)

Sport
- Sport: Swimming
- Strokes: Freestyle, butterfly
- Club: Pointe-Claire Swim Club
- College team: University of Florida
Medal record
Women's swimming
Representing Canada
World Championships (LC)
Bronze medal – third place	1978 West Berlin	100 m butterfly
Bronze medal – third place	1978 West Berlin	4×100 m freestyle
Pan American Games
Silver medal – second place	1975 Mexico City	4×100 m medley
Silver medal – second place	1979 San Juan	4×100 m freestyle
Bronze medal – third place	1975 Mexico City	100 m butterfly
Bronze medal – third place	1979 San Juan	400 m freestyle
Commonwealth Games
Gold medal – first place	1978 Edmonton	100 m butterfly
Gold medal – first place	1978 Edmonton	4×100 m freestyle
Gold medal – first place	1978 Edmonton	4×100 m medley
Silver medal – second place	1974 Christchurch	400 m freestyle
Silver medal – second place	1978 Edmonton	200 m butterfly
Bronze medal – third place	1978 Edmonton	100 m freestyle

Wendy Patricia Quirk (born May 29, 1959) is a former competition swimmer who represented Canada in international swimming events during the 1970s. Quirk won eleven medals in major international swimming championships, spanning the FINA World Championships, Pan American Games and Commonwealth Games.

== International career ==
In her international debut as a 16-year-old, Quirk represented Canada at the 1975 Pan American Games in Mexico City, where she won a bronze medal for her third-place finish in the 100-metre butterfly. The following year at the 1976 Summer Olympics in Montreal, Quebec, Quirk placed fifth overall in the 200-metre butterfly, sixth overall in the 100-metre butterfly, and ninth overall in the 400-metre and 800-metre freestyle events.

At the 1978 Commonwealth Games held in Edmonton, Alberta, Quirk won three gold medals in the 100-metre butterfly, 4x100-metre freestyle relay, and the 4x100-metre medley relay, a silver medal in the 200-metre butterfly, and a bronze medal in the 100-metre freestyle. Later that same year, she won bronze medals for her performances in the 100-metre butterfly and 4x100-metre freestyle relay in the 1978 World Aquatics Championships. In her final international appearance at the 1979 Pan American Games in San Juan, Puerto Rico, she won a pair of silver medals as a member of the Canadian relay teams in the 4x100-metre freestyle and 4x100-metre medley events, together with two bronze medals in individual events, the 100-metre butterfly and 400-metre freestyle.

== College career ==
Quirk attended the University of Florida in Gainesville, Florida, where she swam for the Florida Gators swimming and diving team in National Collegiate Athletic Association (NCAA) competition under coach Randy Reese in 1977 and 1978. During her two-year American college career, she received five All-American honors. She also attended and graduated from the University of Alberta in Edmonton, Alberta.

== See also ==
- List of University of Alberta alumni
- List of University of Florida Olympians
- List of World Aquatics Championships medalists in swimming (women)
