= Chris Black (hammer thrower) =

Scottish hammer thrower (born 1950)

Personal information
- Nationality: British (Scottish)
- Born: 1 January 1950 (age 76) Edinburgh, Scotland
- Height: 188 cm (6 ft 2 in)
- Weight: 115 kg (254 lb)

Sport
- Sport: Athletics
- Event: Hammer throw
- Club: Edinburgh Southern Harriers
Medal record
Representing Scotland
Men's Athletics
British Commonwealth Games
Bronze medal – third place	1978 Edmonton	Hammer throw

Christopher Francis Black (born 1 January 1950) is a retired Scottish hammer thrower, who represented Great Britain at the 1976 Summer Olympics and the 1980 Summer Olympics.

== Biography ==
Black became the British hammer throw champion after winning the British AAA Championships title at the 1976 AAA Championships. Shortly afterwards at the 1976 Olympics Games in Montreal, he represented Great Britain in the hammer throw and finished in 7th place, throwing 73.18 metres

After retaining his AAA title at the 1977 AAA Championships he won a bronze medal representing Scotland at the 1978 Commonwealth Games in Edmonton, Canada in the hammer throw event.

Black competed again at the Olympics when he represented Great Britain at the 1980 Olympics Games in Moscow. He won a third and final AAA title at the 1983 AAA Championships.

He held the Scottish record for the hammer throw from 1983 to 2015.

Following his throwing career, Black coached other athletes and married Scottish international badminton player Christine Heatly.

In March 2018, Black was arrested by Police Scotland relating to charges that included sexually assaulting a young female athlete whom he was coaching at the time and sending her sexually explicit messages but they were dismissed by the Procurator Fiscal Service in 2019 due to a lack of evidence. In September 2024, he was indefinitely suspended from coaching and all athletics activities by UKA after a UKA disciplinary panel upheld the nine charges against Black.

== International competitions ==
Year	Competition	Venue	Position	Notes
Representing Great Britain and Scotland
1983	World Championships	Helsinki, Finland	17th	71.18 m
