= Victor Daniels (weightlifter) =

British weightlifter

Personal information
- Nationality: English
- Born: 9 October 1951 (age 74)

Victor Daniels (born 9 October 1951), is a male former weightlifter who competed for Great Britain and England.

== Weightlifting career ==
Daniels represented Great Britain in the 1976 Summer Olympics.

He represented England in the 60 kg featherweight division, at the 1978 Commonwealth Games in Edmonton, Alberta, Canada.
