= Jim Ashman =

English lawn bowler

Personal information
- Nationality: British (English)
- Born: 2 August 1935 Pontefract, England
- Died: April 2006 (aged 70) York

Sport
- Club: Holgate WMC, York

James "Jim" Ashman (2 August 1935 – April 2006 2006), was an England international lawn bowler who competed at the Commonwealth Games.

== Bowls career ==
Ashman gained his first England cap in 1976 and remained an international until 1981. He bowled for Holgate Working Men's Club in York.

He represented England in the pairs event, at the 1978 Commonwealth Games in Edmonton, Canada.

He won eleven Yorkshire County Championships and three Northern Counties between 1975 and 1989.
