= England at the 1978 Commonwealth Games =

- CG code: ENG
- CGA: Commonwealth Games England

in Edmonton, Alberta, Canada
- Medals Ranked 2nd: Gold 27 Silver 27 Bronze 33 Total 87

Commonwealth Games appearances (overview)
- 1930; 1934; 1938; 1950; 1954; 1958; 1962; 1966; 1970; 1974; 1978; 1982; 1986; 1990; 1994; 1998; 2002; 2006; 2010; 2014; 2018; 2022; 2026; 2030

England competed at the 1978 Commonwealth Games in Edmonton, Alberta, Canada, 3 to 12 August 1978.

England finished second in the medal table behind Canada with 27 gold medals, 27 silver medals and 33 bronze medals.

== Medal table (top three) ==
Rank	Nation	Gold	Silver	Bronze	Total
1	Canada	45	31	33	109
2	England	27	27	33	87
3	Australia	24	33	27	84
Totals (3 entries)		96	91	93	280

The athletes that competed are listed below.

== Athletics ==
Name	Event/s	Medal/s
Brian Adams	30km walk	
Richard John Ashton	400m, 400m relay	
Liz Barnes	800m	
Christine Benning	1,500m	1 x silver
Dave Black	10,000m	
Timothy Bonsor	200m, 100m relay	
Lorna Boothe	100m hurdles	1 x gold
Christina Boxer	1,500m	
Beverly Callender	100m, 200m, 100m relay	1 x gold
Geoff Capes	shot put	1 x gold
Ian Chipchase	hammer	
Dennis Coates	3,000m steeplechase	
Glen Cohen	400m, 400m relay	
Jane Colebrook	800m	1 x bronze
Sharon Colyear	100m hurdles, 100m relay	1 x gold, 1 x bronze
Keith Connor	triple jump	1 x gold
Garry Cook	800m	
Steve Cram	1500m	
Stanley Curran	marathon	
Robert Antony Dale	shot put	
Paul Dickenson	hammer	
Alan Drayton	decathlon	1 x bronze
Verona Elder	400m, 400m relay	1 x gold, 1 x silver
Olly Flynn	30km walk	1 x gold
Ann Ford	3,000m	1 x bronze
Brendan Foster	5,000m 10,000m	1 x bronze
Penny Forse	3,000m	
Paula Fudge	3,000m	1 x gold
Brian Green	100m, 100m relay	
Jeff Gutteridge	pole vault	
Bill Hartley	400m hurdles	
Donna Hartley	400m, 400m relay	2 x gold
Sue Hearnshaw	long jump	
John Hillier	discus	
Gillian Hitchen	high jump	
Mark Holtom	110m hurdles	
Brian Hooper	pole vault	1 x bronze
Leslie Hoyte	100m, 100m relay	
Trevor Hoyte	200m, 100m relay	
Wendy Hoyte	100m	
Joslyn Hoyte-Smith	400m, 400m relay	1 x gold
Tim Hutchings	1500m	
David Johnson	triple jump	
Ruth Kennedy	400m relay	1 x gold
Sonia Lannaman	100m, 200m, 100m relay	2 x gold, 1 x silver
Angela Littlewood	shot put	
Lesley Mallin	discus	
Sue Mapstone	pentathlon	1 x silver
Mike McFarlane	100m, 200m	
Mike McLeod	5,000m, 10,000m	1 x bronze
Roy Mitchell	long jump	1 x gold
David Moorcroft	1500m	1 x gold
Aston Moore	triple jump	1 x bronze
Mark Naylor	high jump	
Paula Newnham	800m	
Jeff Norman	marathon	
Gary Oakes	400m hurdles	
Judy Oakes	shot put	1 x bronze
David Ottley	javelin	
Alan Pascoe	400m hurdles, 400m relay	1 x bronze
Sue Reeve	long jump	1 x gold
Brian Stanley Roberts	javelin	
Nick Rose	5,000m	
Val Rutter	high jump	
Tessa Sanderson	javelin	1 x gold
Amos Seddon	30km walk	
Barbara Simmonds	high jump	
Kathy Smallwood	200m, 100m relay	1 x gold
Shara Anne Helen Spragg	javelin	
Tony Staynings	3,000m steeplechase	
Mary Stewart	1,500m	1 x gold
Shirley Strong	100m hurdles	1 x silver
Colin Peter Szwed	800m	
Pete Tancred	discus	
Daley Thompson	decathlon	
Janet Thompson	discus	
David Warren	800m	
Buster Watson	decathlon	
Fatima Whitbread	javelin	
James Robert Whitehead	hammer	
Terry Whitehead	400m, 400m relay	
John Wild	3,000m steeplechase	
Allan Peter Williams	pole vault	
Mike Winch	discus, shot put	
Yvette Wray	pentathlon	1 x bronze
Trevor Wright	marathon	
Peter Yates	javelin	1 x silver

== Badminton ==
Name	Event/s	Medal/s
Karen Bridge	singles, mixed, team event	1 x gold
David Eddy	singles, mixed, team event	1 x gold
Nora Gardner	singles, doubles, mixed, team event	3 x gold
Kevin Jolly	singles, doubles, mixed, team event	1 x gold
Anne Statt	singles, doubles, mixed, team event	2 x gold
Ray Stevens	singles, doubles, team event	2 x gold, 1 x bronze
Barbara Sutton	doubles, mixed, team event	1 x gold, 1 x bronze
Derek Talbot	singles, doubles, mixed, team event	1 x gold, 1 x silver, 1 x bronze
Mike Tredgett	doubles, mixed, team event	3 x gold
Jane Webster	singles, doubles, team event	1 x gold

== Bowls ==
Name	Event/s	Medal/s
Jim Ashman	pairs	
David Bryant	singles	1 x gold
Charlie Burch	rinks/fours	
Mal Hughes	rinks/fours	
Bill Irish	rinks/fours	
Bob Robertson	rinks/fours	
Chris Ward	pairs	

== Boxing ==
Name	Event/s	Medal/s
Julius Awome	91kg heavyweight	1 x gold
Joe Dawson	48kg light-flyweight	
George Gilbody	60kg lightweight	
Paul Kelly	67kg welterweight	
Gary Nickels	51kg flyweight	
Moss O'Brien	57kg featherweight	1 x bronze
Delroy Parkes	75kg middleweight	1 x silver
Vince Smith	81kg light-heavyweight	1 x silver
Jackie Turner	54kg bantamweight	

== Cycling ==
Name	Event/s	Medal/s
Dave Akam	pursuit	
Bob Downs	road race	
Tony Doyle	scratch race, pursuit, team pursuit	2 x bronze
Paul Fennell	scratch race, time trial, team pursuit	1 x bronze
Des Fretwell	road race	
Trevor Gadd	match sprint, time trial, tandem	2 x silver
Phil Griffiths	road race, pursuit	
Tony James	team pursuit	1 x bronze
Steve Lawrence	road race	
Dave Le Grys	match sprint, tandem	1 x silver
Glen Mitchell	scratch race, team pursuit	1 x bronze
Paul Swinnerton	match sprint, time trial	

== Diving ==
Name	Event/s	Medal/s
Martyn Brown	3m springboard & 10m platform	
Alison Drake	3m springboard	
Marion Saunders	10m platform	
Trevor Simpson	3m springboard	
Chris Snode	3m springboard & 10m platform	2 x gold

== Gymnastics ==
Name	Event/s	Medal/s
Eddie Arnold	individual, team	1 x silver
Susan Cheesebrough	individual, team	1 x silver
Jeff Davis	individual, team	1 x silver
Lisa Jackman	individual, team	1 x silver
Ian Neale	individual, team	1 x silver
Karen Robb	individual, team	1 x silver
Tommy Wilson	individual, team	1 x silver
Joanna Sime	individual, team	1 x silver

== Shooting ==
Name	Event/s	Medal/s
Paul Bentley	skeet	1 x silver
Brian Burrage	50m rifle prone	
John Cooke	rapid fire pistol	1 x silver
Barry Dagger	50m rifle prone	
Sam Gilson	fullbore rifle Queens prize	
Brian Girling	rapid fire pistol	
Andrew Carlisle Jackson	50m free pistol	
David Killick	50m free pistol	
Joe Neville	skeet	1 x bronze
Anthony John Smith	clay pigeon trap	
James Spaight	fullbore rifle Queens prize	1 x silver
Kenneth Wilson	clay pigeon trap	

== Swimming ==
Name	Event/s	Medal/s
Gary Abraham	100/200 backstroke, 100 butterfly, relay	2 x silver
Andrew Astbury	400/1500 freestyle	1 x bronze
Joy Beasley	100/200 backstroke	
Cheryl Brazendale	100/200/400 freestyle, relay	1 x silver
Kevin Burns	100 freestyle, relay	1 x bronze
Richard Burrell	100 freestyle, relay	1 x bronze
Duncan Cleworth	200/400 medley	
Sharron Davies	200 backstroke, 200 freestyle, 200/400 medley, relays	2 x gold, 1 x silver, 1 x bronze
David Dunne	100/200 freestyle, relays	2 x bronze
Helen Gilyard	100 backstroke, relay	1 x bronze
Duncan Goodhew	100/200 breaststroke, relay	3 x silver
Simon Gray	400/1500 freestyle, 200 butterfly, 400 medley, relay	3 x silver, 1 x bronze
Stephen Harrison	100/200 backstroke	
Moira Houston	200 freestyle, 200/400 medley	
Phil Hubble	100/200 butterfly, 200 freestyle, relay	2 x bronze
Sue Jenner	100/200 butterfly, relay	1 x bronze
Margaret Kelly	100/200 breaststroke, relay	1 x silver, 2 x bronze
Steve Lewington	400/1500 freestyle	
Kaye Lovatt	100 freestyle, relay	1 x silver
John Mills	100/200 butterfly, relay	2 x silver
Paul Naisby	100/200 breaststroke	1 x bronze
Ann Osgerby	100/200 butterfly	
Debbie Rudd	100/200 breaststroke	1 x silver
Martin Smith	200 freestyle, relays	1 x silver, 2 x bronze
Heidi Turk	100 freestyle, relay	1 x silver

== Weightlifting ==
Name	Event/s	Medal/s
Newton Burrowes	75kg middleweight	1 x silver
Victor Daniels	60kg featherweight	
Andy Drzewiecki	110kg heavyweight	1 x bronze
Michael Keelan	82.5kg light-heavyweight	
Gary Langford	90kg middle-heavyweight	1 x gold
Steve Pinsent	75kg middleweight	1 x bronze
Gary Shadbolt	82.5kg light-heavyweight	1 x bronze
Gian Cheema Singh	90kg middle-heavyweight	
Kevin Welch-Kennedy	67.5kg lightweight	
Alan Winterbourne	67.5kg lightweight	

== Wrestling ==
Name	Event/s	Medal/s
Brian Aspen	62kg featherweight	1 x bronze
Mark Dunbar	48kg light flyweight	1 x bronze
Amrik Singh Gill	57kg bantamweight	1 x bronze
Joey Gilligan	68kg lightweight	
Keith Haward	74kg welterweight	1 x bronze
Keith Peache	100kg heavyweight	
Tony Shacklady	82kg middleweight	
