= Tony Dawson (badminton) =

Scottish international badminton player

Personal information
- Nationality: British (Scottish)
- Born: c.1952

Sport
- Sport: Badminton
- Club: Aberdeen BC
Medal record
Representing Scotland
Scottish Nationals
Gold medal – first place	1993	singles
Scottish Open
Gold medal – first place	1993	singles

Anthony "Tony" J. Dawson (born c.1952) is a former international badminton player from Scotland who competed at the Commonwealth Games.

== Biography ==
Dawson played out of Aberdeen and won 10 Scotland caps between 1971-1978.

Dawson represented the Scottish team at the 1978 Commonwealth Games in Edmonton, Canada, where he competed in the badminton events.

Dawson also played tennis at national level for Scotland and in 1975 began his legal career with James and George Collie.

In 2019 he became the chairman of Aberdeen Sport and in 2025 celebrated 50 years with the law firm James and George Collie.
