= Hélène Boivin =

Canadian swimmer (born 1959)

Personal information
- Born: 13 February 1959 (age 67) Arvida, Quebec, Canada

Sport
- Sport: Swimming
Medal record
Women's swimming
Representing Canada
Commonwealth Games
Gold medal – first place	1978 Edmonton	4×100 m medley
Silver medal – second place	1978 Edmonton	100 m backstroke

Hélène Boivin (born 13 February 1959) is a Canadian former swimmer. She competed in the women's 100 metre butterfly at the 1976 Summer Olympics.
