= Paul Naisby =

British swimmer

Personal information
- Born: 18 July 1955 (age 70) Sunderland, Tyne and Wear, England

Sport
- Sport: Swimming
- Strokes: Breaststroke
Medal record
Men's swimming
Representing England
Commonwealth Games
Bronze medal – third place	1974 Christchurch	100 m breaststroke
Bronze medal – third place	1974 Christchurch	200 m breaststroke
Bronze medal – third place	1978 Edmonton	100 m breaststroke

Paul Charles Naisby (born 18 July 1955) is a British former swimmer.

== Career ==
Naisby competed at the 1972 Summer Olympics and the 1976 Summer Olympics.

He represented England and won two bronze medals in the 100 metres and 200 metres breaststroke events, at the 1974 British Commonwealth Games in Christchurch, New Zealand. Four years later he represented England again and won another bronze medal in the 100 metres breaststroke, at the 1978 Commonwealth Games in Edmonton, Alberta, Canada. He won the ASA National Championship title in the 100 metres breaststroke (1977) and the 1977 title in the 200 metres butterfly.
