= Moira Houston =

English swimmer

Moira Anne Houston
Personal information
- Nationality: England
- Born: 1961 (age 64–65) Merton. Surrey

Moira Jane Houston (born 1961), is a female former swimmer who competed for England.

== Swimming career ==
In 1976 Moira became a double National champion after winning the ASA National Championship 200 metres freestyle and 400 metres freestyle. She also represented England in the 200 metres freestyle and the 200 and 400 metres medley events, at the 1978 Commonwealth Games in Edmonton, Alberta, Canada.
