= Richard Burrell (swimmer) =

British swimmer

Personal information
- Full name: Richard James Burrell
- Born: 22 March 1959 (age 67) Southampton, England

Sport
- Sport: Swimming
Medal record
Men's swimming
Representing England
Commonwealth Games
Silver medal – second place	1982 Brisbane	4×100 m freestyle
Silver medal – second place	1982 Brisbane	4×200 m freestyle
Bronze medal – third place	1978 Edmonton	4×100 m freestyle

Richard James Burrell (born 22 March 1959) is a British swimmer.

== Swimming career ==
Burrell competed in two events at the 1984 Summer Olympics. He represented England and won a bronze medal in the 4 x 100 metres freestyle relay, at the 1978 Commonwealth Games in Edmonton, Alberta, Canada. Four years later, he represented England and won two silver medals in the 4 x 100 and 4 x 200 metres freestyle relays, at the 1982 Commonwealth Games in Brisbane, Queensland, Australia. He also won the 1978 ASA National Championship 100 metres freestyle title.
