= George Nagy =

Canadian swimmer (born 1957)

Personal information
- Full name: George Nagy
- National team: Canada
- Born: July 19, 1957 (age 69) North York, Ontario

Sport
- Sport: Swimming
- Strokes: Butterfly
Medal record
Men's swimming
Representing Canada
Pan American Games
Silver medal – second place	1979 San Juan	200 m butterfly
Commonwealth Games
Gold medal – first place	1978 Edmonton	200 m butterfly

George Michael Nagy (born June 9, 1957) is a Canadian former swimmer who specialized in the butterfly events during the 1970s and early 1980s.

== Biography ==
Nagy was born on 9 June 1957 North York, Toronto, Ontario, Canada.

He competed for Canada at the 1976 Summer Olympics, where he placed tenth in the 200 m butterfly. He won gold in the 200 m butterfly at the 1978 Commonwealth Games, and a silver medal in the same event at the 1979 Pan American Games.

== See also ==
- List of Commonwealth Games medallists in swimming (men)
