= Leigh Atkinson =

English swimmer

Personal information
- Born: 10 June 1958 (age 68) Bishop's Stortford, Hertfordshire, England
- Height: 184 cm (6 ft 0 in)
- Weight: 77 kg (170 lb)

Sport
- Sport: Swimming

Leigh Atkinson (born 10 June 1958) is a Welsh former swimmer. He competed in the men's 100 metre breaststroke at the 1980 Summer Olympics. Leigh also competed for Wales at the 1978 Commonwealth Games held in Edmonton, Canada and at the 1982 Commonwealth Games in Brisbane, Australia. On retirement from competing Leigh became the Welsh National Coach, taking the Welsh Team to the Commonwealth Games in Auckland, NZ in 1990.
