= Joy Beasley =

British swimmer

Personal information
- Born: 25 July 1962 (age 63) Stourbridge, England

Sport
- Sport: Swimming

Joy Wendy Beasley (born 25 July 1962) is a British former swimmer. She competed at the 1976 Summer Olympics and the 1980 Summer Olympics.

She also represented England in the 100 and 200 metres backstroke, at the 1978 Commonwealth Games in Edmonton, Alberta, Canada. In 1977 she won the ASA National Championship over 100 metres backstroke.
