= Simon Gray (swimmer) =

British swimmer (born 1959)

Personal information
- Born: 29 April 1969 (age 57) Fulham, England

Sport
- Sport: Swimming
Medal record
Men's swimming
Representing England
Commonwealth Games
Silver medal – second place	1978 Edmonton	1500 m freestyle
Silver medal – second place	1978 Edmonton	400 m freestyle
Silver medal – second place	1978 Edmonton	400 m medley
Bronze medal – third place	1978 Edmonton	4×200 m freestyle

Simon Francis Gray (born 29 April 1959) is a retired British international swimmer.

== Swimming career ==
Gray competed in three events at the 1980 Summer Olympics. In 1978 he won four medals at the Commonwealth Games, representing England he won a bronze medal in the 4 × 200 m freestyle relay and three silver medals in the 400 and 1,500 metres freestyle and the 440 metres individual medley, at the 1978 Commonwealth Games in Edmonton, Alberta, Canada. In 1978 he won the ASA National British Championships 200 metres medley title and the 1978 and 1980 ASA National Championship 400 metres medley title. He also the 1978 ASA British National 1500 metres freestyle title.
