= Cheryl Brazendale =

English swimmer (born 1963)

Personal information
- Nationality: England
- Born: 1963 (age 62–63) Suffolk
Medal record
Women's swimming
Representing Great Britain
European Championships
Bronze medal – third place	1977 Jönköping	4×100 m freestyle
Representing England
Commonwealth Games
Silver medal – second place	1978 Edmonton	4×100 m freestyle

Cheryl Elaine Brazendale (born 1963), is a female former swimmer who competed for Great Britain and England.

== Swimming career ==
She was the first British woman to swim the 100m freestyle under 1 minute, on Friday August 27, 1976.

Brazendale represented Great Britain in the 1978 World Aquatics Championships.

She represented England and won a silver medal in the 4 x 100 metres freestyle, at the 1978 Commonwealth Games in Edmonton, Alberta, Canada.

Swimming for Norbeck Castle, Blackpool, she won 1976 ASA National Championship over 100 metres freestyle.
