= Paul Marshall (swimmer) =

British swimmer (1961–2009)

Personal information
- Nationality: British (Scottish)
- Born: 28 April 1961 Dundee, Scotland
- Died: 23 May 2009 (aged 48) Dundee, Scotland
- Height: 182 cm (6 ft 0 in)
- Weight: 75 kg (165 lb)

Sport
- Sport: Swimming
- Strokes: backstroke

Paul Julian Marshall (28 April 1961 – 23 May 2009) was a British swimmer. He competed in two events at the 1980 Summer Olympics. He died from cancer in 2009, and was only the second black swimmer to compete for Great Britain at the Olympics, after Kevin Burns in 1976.

Marshall was born to a Dundee mother and Ghanaian father.
