= Athletics at the 1978 Commonwealth Games – Men's 30 kilometres walk =

Men's 30 kilometres walk at the Commonwealth Games

The men's 30 kilometres walk event at the 1978 Commonwealth Games was held on 8 August at the Commonwealth Stadium in Edmonton, Alberta, Canada.

== Results ==
Rank	Name	Nationality	Time	Notes
1st place, gold medalist(s)	Olly Flynn	England	2:22:03.70	
2nd place, silver medalist(s)	Willi Sawall	Australia	2:22:58.58	
3rd place, bronze medalist(s)	Tim Erickson	Australia	2:26:33.97	
4	Brian Adams	England	2:29:41.45	
5	Amos Seddon	England	2:29:57.53	
6	Helmut Boeck	Canada	2:31:20.85	
7	Graham Seatter	New Zealand	2:31:48.92	
8	Graham Young	Isle of Man	2:33:14.91	
9	Marcel Jobin	Canada	2:35:01.32	
10	Elisha Kasuku	Kenya	2:43:25.22	
11	Rashid Chege	Kenya	2:45:12.53	
12	Vellasamy Subramaniam	Malaysia	2:56:07.11	
	John Callow	Isle of Man	DNF	
	Robert Lambie	Isle of Man	DNF	
	David Munyao	Kenya	DNF	
	Mike Parker	New Zealand	DNF	
