= Dan Thompson (swimmer) =

Canadian swimmer

Personal information
- Born: June 15, 1956 (age 70)
Medal record
Men's swimming
Representing Canada
Commonwealth Games
Gold medal – first place	1978 Edmonton	100 m butterfly
Gold medal – first place	1978 Edmonton	4×100 m medley
Gold medal – first place	1982 Brisbane	100 m butterfly
Pan American Games
Silver medal – second place	1979 San Juan	100 m butterfly
Silver medal – second place	1979 San Juan	4×100 m medley
Summer Universiade
Silver medal – second place	1977 Sofia	100 m butterfly

Dan David Thompson (born June 15, 1956) is a Canadian retired swimmer. He competed in the butterfly events during the 1970s and early 1980s. He was supposed to represent his native country at the 1980 Summer Olympics, but didn't start due to the international boycott of the Moscow Olympic Games. He won two silver medals at the 1979 Pan American Games.

== See also ==
- List of Commonwealth Games medallists in swimming (men)
