= Ron McKeon =

Australian swimmer

Personal information
- Full name: Ronald John McKeon
- Nickname: "Ron"
- National team: Australia
- Born: 6 February 1961 (age 65)
- Height: 1.86 m (6 ft 1 in)
- Weight: 88 kg (194 lb)

Sport
- Sport: Swimming
- Strokes: Freestyle
Medal record
Men's swimming
Representing Australia
Commonwealth Games
Gold medal – first place	1978 Edmonton	200 m freestyle
Gold medal – first place	1978 Edmonton	400 m freestyle
Gold medal – first place	1978 Edmonton	4×200 m freestyle
Gold medal – first place	1982 Brisbane	4×200 m freestyle
Silver medal – second place	1978 Edmonton	4×100 m freestyle
Bronze medal – third place	1982 Brisbane	200 m freestyle

Ronald John McKeon (born 6 February 1961) is a former competition swimmer who represented Australia in the 1980 Summer Olympics and 1984 Summer Olympics. He has three children, Kaitlin, Emma and David. Emma and David McKeon are previous members of the Australian national swimming team in international competition.

== See also ==
- List of Commonwealth Games medallists in swimming (men)
