= Amanda James =

British swimmer

Personal information
- Full name: Amanda Elizabeth James
- Nickname: Mandy
- Nationality: British
- Born: 25 October 1960 (age 65)
- Height: 169 cm (5 ft 7 in)
- Weight: 54 kg (119 lb)

Sport
- Sport: Swimming

Amanda Elizabeth "Mandy" James (born 25 October 1960) is a British former swimmer. James competed in the women's 100 metre backstroke at the 1976 Summer Olympics. At the ASA National British Championships she won the 100 metres backstroke title twice (1976 and 1978).
