= Athletics at the 1978 Commonwealth Games – Women's discus throw =

Women's discus throw at the Commonwealth Games

The women's discus throw event at the 1978 Commonwealth Games was held on 7 August at the Commonwealth Stadium in Edmonton, Alberta, Canada.

== Results ==
Rank	Name	Nationality	Result	Notes
1st place, gold medalist(s)	Carmen Ionesco	Canada	62.16	
2nd place, silver medalist(s)	Gael Mulhall	Australia	57.60	
3rd place, bronze medalist(s)	Lucette Moreau	Canada	56.64	
4	Meg Ritchie	Scotland	55.66	
5	Janet Thompson	England	53.70	
6	Lesley Mallin	England	50.56	
7	Luigina Torso	Australia	47.10	
8	Venissa Head	Wales	45.72	
9	Beryl Bethel	Bahamas	43.50	
10	Lilian Cherotich	Kenya	40.72	
