= Duncan Cleworth =

British swimmer (born 1957)

Personal information
- Born: 20 April 1957 (age 69) Leigh, England

Sport
- Sport: Swimming
- Club: Tyldesley Swimming & Water Polo Club

John Duncan Cleworth (born 20 April 1957) is a male British former swimmer.

== Information ==
Cleworth is a relative of Addin Tyldesley, who competed in the men's 100 metre freestyle event at the 1908 Summer Olympics. Duncan's ancestors were said to be a famous swimming family. Like his family members, he swam at the Tyldesley Swimming and Water Polo Club, where he was later declared one of their most famous members.

Cleworth competed in the men's 400 metre individual medley at the 1976 Summer Olympics. During the Olympics, Duncan announced that he was going to the University of Miami on a swimming scholarship and but ended up leaving the college in 1977.

He represented England in the 100 and 200 metres individual medley events, at the 1978 Commonwealth Games in Edmonton, Alberta, Canada. At the ASA National British Championships he won the 200 metres medley title in 1977 and 1978.
