= Glenda Robertson =

Australian swimmer

Personal information
- Full name: Glenda Joy Robertson
- Born: 7 March 1961 (age 65)

Sport
- Sport: Swimming
- Strokes: Backstroke
Medal record
Women's swimming
Representing Australia
Commonwealth Games
Bronze medal – third place	1978 Edmonton	200 m backstroke

Glenda Joy Robertson (married name Radley, born 7 March 1961) is an Australian former backstroke swimmer. She competed in two events at the 1976 Summer Olympics.
