= John Mills (swimmer) =

British swimmer

Personal information
- Born: 28 March 1953 (age 73)

Sport
- Sport: Swimming
Medal record
Men's swimming
Representing Great Britain
World Championships (LC)
Bronze medal – third place	1978 West Berlin	4×100 m medley
European Championships (LC)
Bronze medal – third place	1977 Jönköping	100 m butterfly
Bronze medal – third place	1977 Jönköping	4×100 m medley
Representing England
British Commonwealth Games
Silver medal – second place	1978 Montreal	100 m butterfly
Silver medal – second place	1978 Montreal	4×100 m medley
Bronze medal – third place	1970 Edinburgh	4×200 m freestyle

John Maurice Mills (born 28 March 1953) is a retired British international swimmer.

== Swimming career ==
He competed at the 1972 Summer Olympics and the 1976 Summer Olympics.

He represented England and won a bronze medal in the 4 x 200m freestyle relay, at the 1970 British Commonwealth Games in Edinburgh, Scotland. Eight years later he won double silver in the 100 metres butterfly and the 4 x 100m medley relay, at the 1978 Commonwealth Games in Montreal, Canada. He also won the ASA National Championship title in the 100 metres butterfly (1972, 1976, 1977, 1978) and the 1971 title in the 200 metres butterfly. He also won the 1971 ASA British National 1500 metres freestyle title.
