= Debra Forster =

Australian swimmer (born 1961)

Personal information
- National team: Australia
- Born: 25 August 1961 (age 65)

Sport
- Sport: Swimming
- Strokes: Backstroke
- Coach: Jim O'Doherty
Medal record
Women's swimming
Representing Australia
Commonwealth Games
Gold medal – first place	1978 Edmonton	100 m backstroke
Silver medal – second place	1978 Edmonton	4×100 m medley

Debra Lynn Forster (born 25 August 1961) is an Australian former swimmer who won a gold medal in the 100m backstroke event at the 1978 Commonwealth Games in Edmonton, Canada.

Upon finding out that she would be going to the 1978 Commonwealth Games in what would be her first trip overseas, Forster was surprised to be selected as she did not believe she had swum well during the selection trials in Sydney. She "burst into international swimming" in January 1978 when she set an Australian record in the 100m backstroke of 1:04.87 at Melbourne's Olympic stadium. At the time she was selected for the Commonwealth Games, she was training to be a secretary.

While training for the games in Honolulu, she had decided that she would quit swimming upon her return home, yet had a change of heart upon winning a gold medal in the 1978 Commonwealth 100m backstroke event. After her win, she noted that she had changed her entire outlook on swimming, deciding that "it was all worth while" and then aiming towards winning a berth on the swimming team for the 1980 Summer Olympics in Moscow. During her time in Edmonton, she got tonsillitis and had to isolate in bed for several days, although it wasn't believed likely to have any effect on her performance.

In January 1979, she set an Australian residential and Victorian state 100m backstroke record with a time of 1:04.64, beating her own previous best by 0.23 seconds. She then followed this up with a Victorian state record in the 200m backstroke of 2:18.91.

== Personal ==
Her mother was Jean Forster, from the Melbourne suburb of Cheltenham, Victoria.
