= Kevin Burns (swimmer) =

British swimmer

Personal information
- Born: 19 September 1955 (age 71)

Sport
- Sport: Swimming
Medal record
Swimming
Representing England
Commonwealth Games
Bronze medal – third place	1978 Edmonton	4x100 freestyle relay

Kevin Robert Burns (born 19 September 1955) is a British former swimmer. He competed in two events at the 1976 Summer Olympics, becoming the first black swimmer to represent Great Britain at the Olympic Games.

He represented England and won a bronze medal in the 4 x 100 metres freestyle relay, at the 1978 Commonwealth Games in Edmonton, Alberta, Canada. He won the 1976 ASA National Championship 100 metres freestyle title.
