= Rosemary Brown (swimmer) =

Australian swimmer (born 1961)

Personal information
- Born: 11 April 1961 (age 65)

Sport
- Sport: Swimming
- Strokes: Freestyle
Medal record
Women's swimming
Representing Australia
Commonwealth Games
| Silver medal – second place | 1978 Edmonton | 100 m freestyle |
| Silver medal – second place | 1978 Edmonton | 4×100 m medley |
| Bronze medal – third place | 1978 Edmonton | 4×100 m freestyle |

Rosemary Edith Brown (born 11 April 1961) is an Australian swimmer. She competed in six events at the 1980 Summer Olympics.
