= Glenn Patching =

Australian swimmer

Personal information
- Full name: Glenn Scott Patching
- National team: Australia
- Born: 12 April 1958 (age 68)
- Height: 1.89 m (6 ft 2 in)
- Weight: 84 kg (185 lb)

Sport
- Sport: Swimming
- Strokes: Backstroke, freestyle
Medal record
Men's swimming
Representing Australia
Commonwealth Games
Gold medal – first place	1978 Edmonton	100 m backstroke
Silver medal – second place	1978 Edmonton	200 m backstroke
Silver medal – second place	1978 Edmonton	4×100 m freestyle
Bronze medal – third place	1978 Edmonton	4×100 m medley

Glenn Scott Patching (born 12 April 1958) was an Australian backstroke and freestyle swimmer of the 1970s and 1980s, who won the gold medal in the men's 100-metre backstroke event at the 1978 Commonwealth Games. He represented his native country at two consecutive Summer Olympics, starting in 1976.

== See also ==
- List of Commonwealth Games medallists in swimming (men)
