= Athletics at the 1978 Commonwealth Games – Men's hammer throw =

Men's hammer throw at the Commonwealth Games

The men's hammer throw event at the 1978 Commonwealth Games was held on 6 August at the Commonwealth Stadium in Edmonton, Alberta, Canada.

== Results ==
Rank	Name	Nationality	Result	Notes
1st place, gold medalist(s)	Peter Farmer	Australia	71.10	
2nd place, silver medalist(s)	Scott Neilson	Canada	69.92	
3rd place, bronze medalist(s)	Chris Black	Scotland	68.14	
4	Derek Dickenson	England	66.42	
5	James Whitehead	England	65.48	
6	Ian Chipchase	England	64.80	
7	Martin Girvan	Northern Ireland	60.86	
8	Agostino Puopolo	Australia	59.74	
9	Absalom Simiti	Kenya	43.38	
	Harold Willers	Canada	NM	
