= Linda Hanel =

Australian swimmer (born 1961)

Personal information
- Born: 17 October 1961 (age 64)

Sport
- Sport: Swimming
Medal record
Women's swimming
Representing Australia
Commonwealth Games
Bronze medal – third place	1978 Edmonton	100 m butterfly
Bronze medal – third place	1978 Edmonton	200 m butterfly

Linda Margaret Hanel (born 17 October 1961) is an Australian former champion swimmer. She competed in three events at the 1976 Summer Olympics in Montreal - the 100-metre Women's Butterfly (12th position), the 200-metre Women's Butterfly (12th position) and the 4x100-metre Women's Medley Relay (8th position). At the 1978 Commonwealth Games in Edmonton, Canada, Hanel set a Games record in her qualifying heat, with a time of 2:14.54. She went on to win a bronze medal in both the Women's 100-metre Butterfly and the 200-metre Butterfly. In her home state of Victoria, she held the record for the 200-metre open butterfly for nearly 26 years, with a time of 2:12.12.

Hanel won gold at the 1979 Spartaklad Games in Moscow in the 100-metre Butterfly event, crediting her friend, fellow Olympic swimmer Michelle Ford, for her success. She withdrew from the 1980 Moscow Olympics due to illness.
