= Richard Iredale =

British swimmer

Personal information
- Born: 9 February 1957 (age 69)

Sport
- Sport: Swimming

Richard Norman Iredale (born 9 February 1957) is a British former swimmer. He competed in the men's 100 metre butterfly at the 1976 Summer Olympics.
