= Lindsay Spencer (swimmer) =

Australian swimmer

Personal information
- Born: 12 November 1961 (age 64)

Sport
- Sport: Swimming
- Strokes: Breaststroke
Medal record
Men's swimming
Representing Australia
Commonwealth Games
| Bronze medal – third place | 1978 Edmonton | 200 m breaststroke |
| Bronze medal – third place | 1978 Edmonton | 4×100 m medley |

Lindsay Philip Spencer (born 12 November 1961) is an Australian swimmer. He competed in two events at the 1980 Summer Olympics.
