= Mark Morgan (swimmer) =

Australian swimmer

Personal information
- Nationality: Australian
- Born: Mark Lincoln Morgan

Sport
- Sport: Swimming
- Strokes: Freestyle
Medal record
Men's swimming
Representing Australia
Commonwealth Games
Gold medal – first place	1978 Edmonton	100 m freestyle
Gold medal – first place	1978 Edmonton	4×200 m freestyle
Silver medal – second place	1978 Edmonton	4×100 m freestyle
Bronze medal – third place	1978 Edmonton	200 m freestyle
Bronze medal – third place	1978 Edmonton	4×100 m medley

Mark Lincoln Morgan is an Australian former swimmer who primarily competed in freestyle and butterfly events.

Morgan was the Commonwealth champion in the 100 metres freestyle at the 1978 Commonwealth Games in Edmonton, with a time of 52.70 seconds, to finish ahead of Canadians Bill Sawchuk and Gary MacDonald. He won a further four medals in Edmonton, including gold in the 4 × 200 m freestyle relay and a bronze in the 200m freestyle.

Named in the Australian team for the 1980 Moscow Olympics, Morgan opted to join the boycott and announced his withdrawal in late May, two months before the event was due to begin. He wrote a letter to the Australian Olympic Federation explaining his stance, citing Russia's foreign policy and concern that an athlete's presence at the games would be used as propaganda, amongst his reasons for not going to Moscow.
