= Paul Moorfoot =

Australian swimmer

Personal information
- Born: 3 March 1960 (age 66)

Sport
- Sport: Swimming
- Strokes: backstroke, butterfly, medley
Medal record
Men's swimming
Representing Australia
Commonwealth Games
Bronze medal – third place	1978 Edmonton	200 m backstroke

Paul John Moorfoot (born 3 March 1960) is an Australian swimmer. He competed in three events at the 1980 Summer Olympics.
