= Peter Dawson (swimmer) =

Australian swimmer

Personal information
- Born: 2 April 1957 (age 69)

Sport
- Sport: Swimming
Medal record
Men's swimming
Representing Australia
Commonwealth Games
Bronze medal – third place	1978 Edmonton	200 m medley

Peter William Bruce Dawson (born 2 April 1957) is an Australian former swimmer. He competed in three events at the 1976 Summer Olympics.
