= Swimming at the 1970 British Commonwealth Games =

- Venue: Royal Commonwealth Pool
- Location: Edinburgh, Scotland
- Dates: 16 – 25 July 1970

Swimming at the 1970 British Commonwealth Games was the ninth appearance of Swimming at the Commonwealth Games. There were 29 swimming events and they took place from 16 to 25 July 1970.

The events were held at the Royal Commonwealth Pool, specifically constructed for the Games. Construction began in 1967 and was completed in October 1969.

Australia topped the medal table with 18 gold medals.

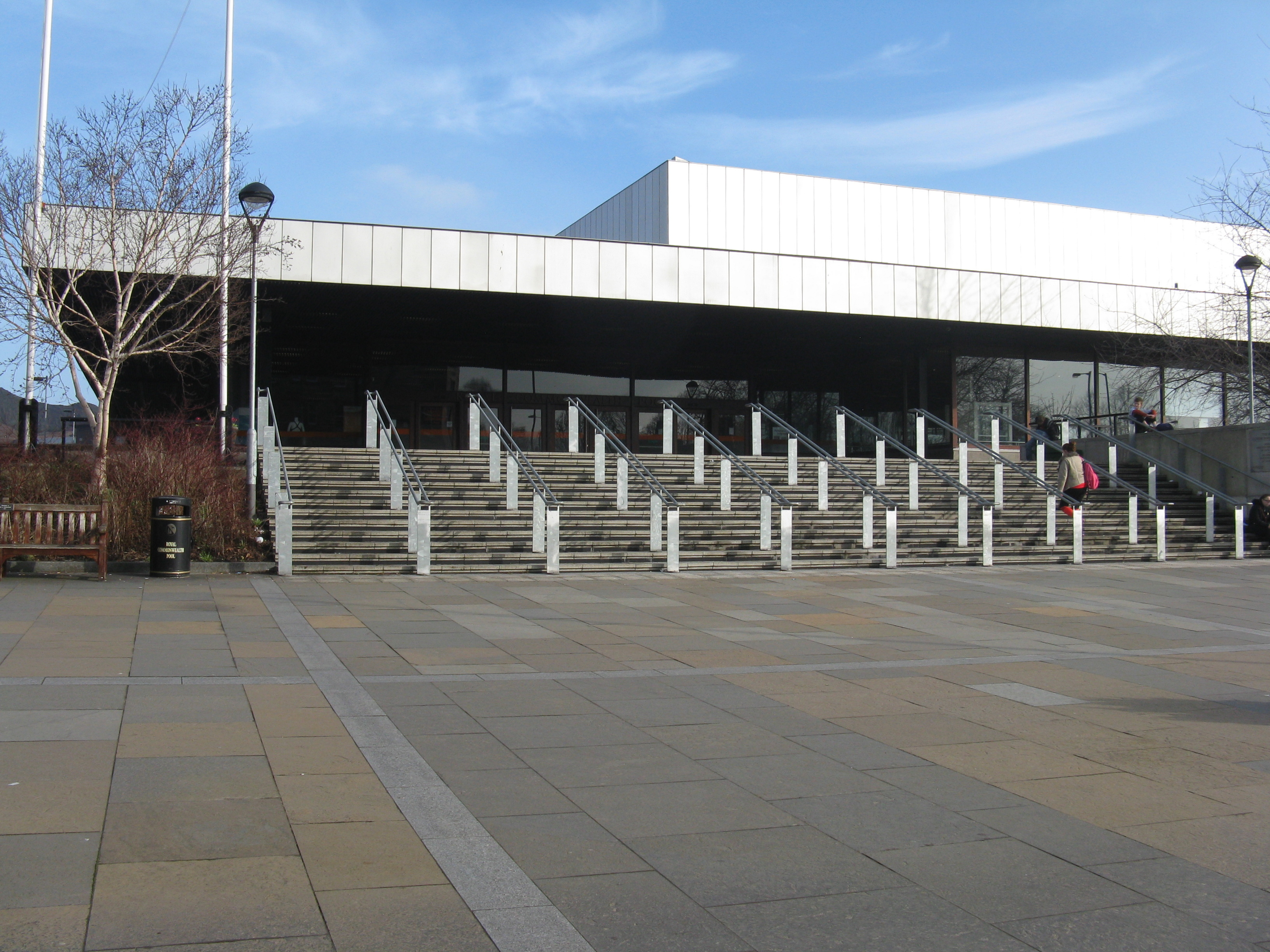
The Royal Commonwealth Pool

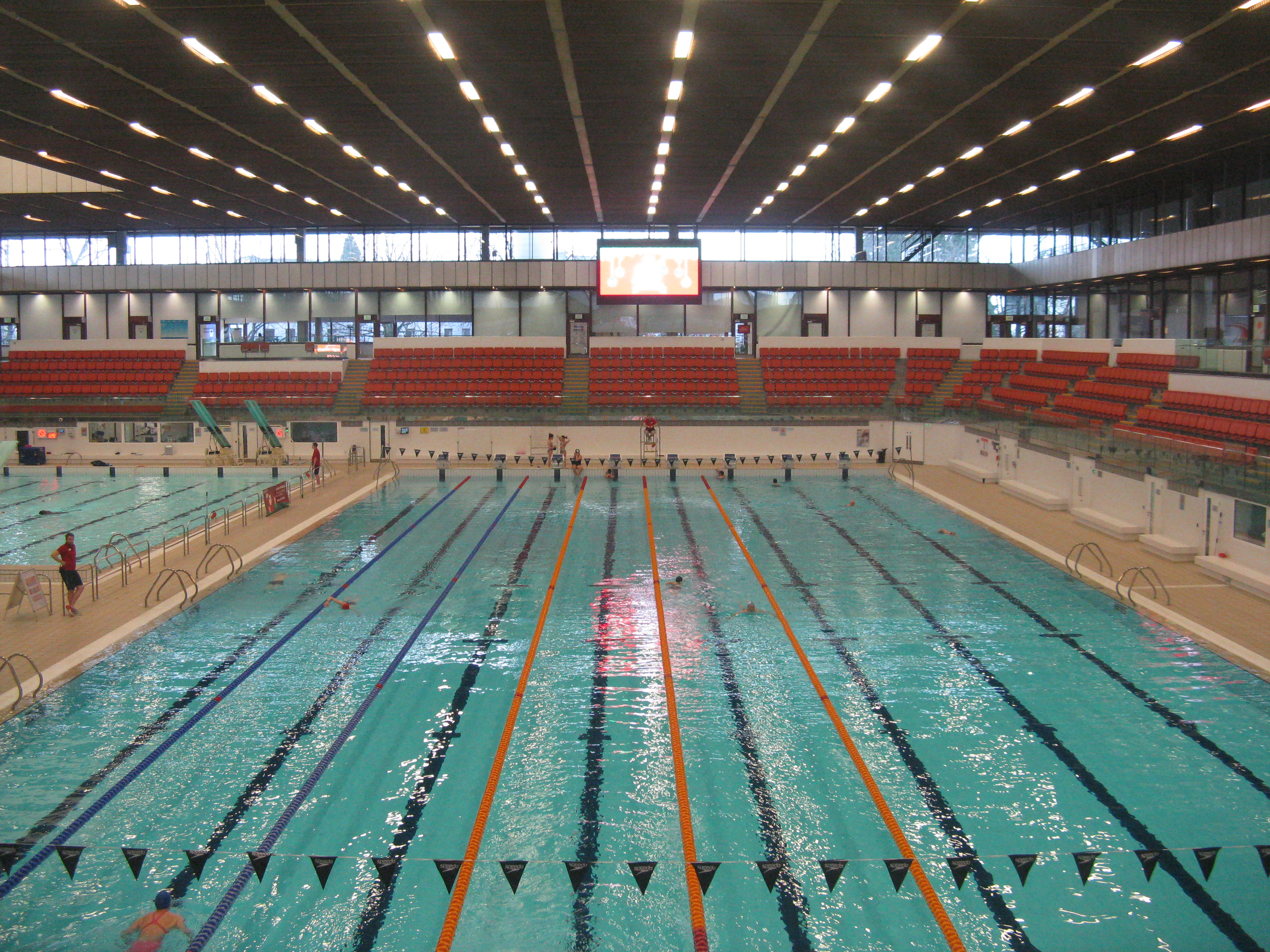
The pool in 2015

== Medal table ==
* Host nation (Scotland)

Medals won by nation with totals, ranked by number of golds—sortable
Rank	Nation	Gold	Silver	Bronze	Total
1	Australia	18	10	14	42
2	Canada	9	11	4	24
3	England	1	6	6	13
4	Wales	1	2	2	5
5	Isle of Man	0	0	1	1
5	New Zealand	0	0	1	1
5	Scotland*	0	0	1	1
Totals (7 entries)		29	29	29	87

== Medal winners ==
Men's events

Event	Gold	Silver	Bronze
100 m freestyle	(Australia) Mike Wenden	(Australia) Greg Rogers	(Australia) Bill Devenish
200 m freestyle	(Australia) Mike Wenden	(Canada) Ralph Hutton	(Australia) Greg Rogers
400 m freestyle	(Australia) Graham White	(Canada) Ralph Hutton	(Australia) Greg Brough
1500 m freestyle	(Australia) Graham Windeatt	(Australia) Max Tavasci	(New Zealand) Mark Treffers
100 m backstroke	(Canada) Bill Kennedy	(Wales) Michael Richards	(Canada) Erik Fish
200 m backstroke	(Wales) Michael Richards	(England) Raymond Terrell	(Australia) Neil Rogers
100 m breaststroke	(Canada) Bill Mahony	(Canada) Peter Cross	(Australia) Paul Jarvie
200 m breaststroke	(Canada) Bill Mahony	(Australia) Paul Jarvie	(Scotland) David Wilkie
100 m butterfly	(Canada) Byron MacDonald	(Canada) Tom Arusoo	(Canada) Ron Jacks
200 m butterfly	(Canada) Tom Arusoo	(Wales) Martyn Woodroffe	(Australia) James Findlay
200 m individual medley	(Canada) George Smith	(Canada) Ken Campbell	(Wales) Martyn Woodroffe
400 m individual medley	(Canada) George Smith	(England) Raymond Terrell	(Australia) James Findlay
4×100 m freestyle relay	(Australia); Graham White; Gregory Rogers; Michael Wenden; William Devenish	(Canada); George Smith; Ralph Hutton; Robert Kasting; Ron Jacks	(England); Tony Jarvis; Ivan Myall; Malcolm Windeatt; Raymond Terrell
4×200 m freestyle relay	(Australia); Graham White; Gregory Rogers; Michael Wenden; Bill Devenish	(Canada); George Smith; Ralph Hutton; Robert Kasting; Ron Jacks	(England); Tony Jarvis; Ivan Myall; John Mills; Raymond Terrell
4×100 m medley relay	(Canada); Byron MacDonald; Robert Kasting; Bill Mahony; Bill Kennedy	(Australia); James Findlay; Michael Wenden; Neil Rogers; Paul Jarvie	(Wales); Kevan Moran; Michael Richards; Martyn Woodroffe; Nigel Johnson

Women's events

Event	Gold	Silver	Bronze
100 m freestyle	(Canada) Angela Coughlan	(Australia) Lynne Watson	(Australia) Jenny Watts
200 m freestyle	(Australia) Karen Moras	(Canada) Angela Coughlan	(Isle of Man) Alex Jackson
400 m freestyle	(Australia) Karen Moras	(Australia) Denise Langford	(Australia) Robyn Risson
800 m freestyle	(Australia) Karen Moras	(Australia) Helen Gray	(Australia) Robyn Risson
100 m backstroke	(Australia) Lynne Watson	(Australia) Debra Cain	(Canada) Donna Gurr
200 m backstroke	(Australia) Lynne Watson	(Canada) Donna Gurr	(Australia) Debra Cain
100 m breaststroke	(Australia) Beverley Whitfield	(England) Dorothy Harrison	(England) Christine Jarvis
200 m breaststroke	(Australia) Beverley Whitfield	(England) Dorothy Harrison	(England) Amanda Radnage
100 m butterfly	(England) Diane Lansley	(Canada) Susan Smith	(Australia) Allyson Mabb
200 m butterfly	(Australia) Maree Robinson	(Australia) Jane Comerford	(Australia) Allyson Mabb
200 m individual medley	(Australia) Denise Langford	(England) Shelagh Ratcliffe	(Australia) Diana Rickard
400 m individual medley	(Australia) Denise Langford	(Australia) Gail Neall	(England) Shelagh Ratcliffe
4×100 m freestyle relay	(Australia); Debra Cain; Denise Langford; Jenny Watts; Lynne Watson	(Canada); Angela Coughlan; Karen James; Linda Hall; Susan Smith	(England); Diana Sutherland; Kathryn Smith; Lesley Allardice; Sally Pickering
4×100 m medley relay	(Australia); Allyson Mabb; Beverley Whitfield; Denise Langford; Lynne Watson	(England); Diane Lansley; Dorothy Harrison; Kathryn Smith; Sylvia Platt	(Canada); Angela Coughlan; Donna Gurr; Susan Smith; Sylvia Dockerill

== Finals (men) ==
=== 100m freestyle ===
Pos	Athlete	Time
1	(Australia) Mike Wenden	53.06
2	(Australia) Greg Rogers	54.26
3	(Australia) Bill Devenish	54.28
4	(New Zealand) Mike J. Borrie	54.57
5	(England) Tony Jarvis	54.94
6	(Canada) Robert Kasting	55.10
7	(Canada) Ralph Hutton	55.39
8	(England) Malcolm Windeatt	55.65

=== 200m freestyle ===
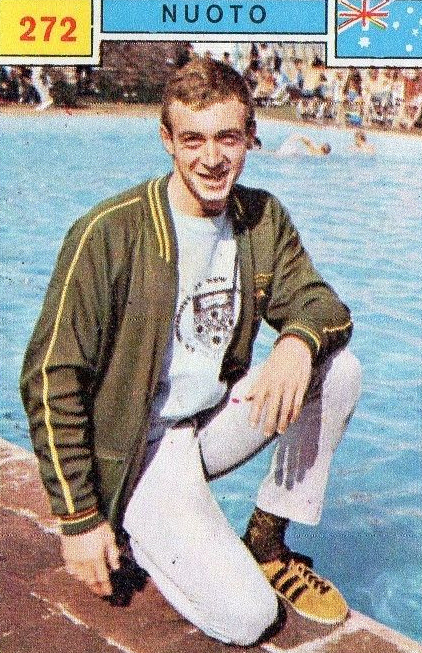
Mike Wenden

Pos	Athlete	Time
1	(Australia) Mike Wenden	1:56.69
2	(Canada) Ralph Hutton	1:58.45
3	(Australia) Greg Rogers	1:58.63
4	(Australia) Graham White	1:58.71
5	(New Zealand) Mike J. Borrie	2:00.74
6	(Canada) Ron Jacks	2:00.95
7	(Canada) Robert Kasting	2:01.21
8	(New Zealand) Ian J. Curry	2:02.96

=== 400m freestyle ===
Pos	Athlete	Time
1	(Australia) Graham White	4:08.48
2	(Canada) Ralph Hutton	4:08.77
3	(Australia) Greg Brough	4:12.16
4	(Canada) Ron Jacks	4:12.23
5	(Australia) Richard Michael Wilkinson	4:14.71
6	(New Zealand) Mike J. Borrie	4:20.35
7	(New Zealand) Ian J. Curry	4:21.64
8	(Canada) Peter Harrower	4:23.80

=== 1500m freestyle ===
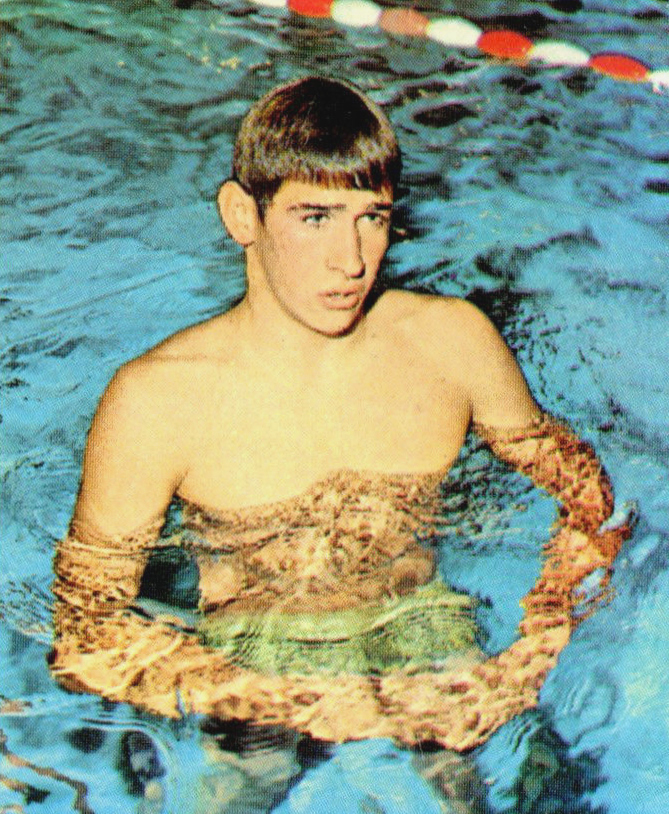
Graham Windeatt

Pos	Athlete	Time
1	(Australia) Graham Windeatt	16:23.82
2	(Australia) Max Tavasci	16:34.46
3	(New Zealand) Mark Treffers	16:44.69
4	(Australia) Greg Brough	17:00.58
5	(Canada) Peter Harrower	17:28.15
6	(Canada) Steve Roxborough	17:29.72
7	(Wales) Martin Richards	17:52.63

=== 100m backstroke ===
Pos	Athlete	Time
1	(Canada) Bill Kennedy	1:01.65
2	(Wales) Mike Richards	1:01.69
3	(Canada) Erik Fish	1:02.02
4	(Canada) Bradley Storey	1:02.33
5	(England) Jimmy Rogers	1:02.72
6	(England) Clive Rushton	1:03.24
7	(England) Tony Davidson	1:03.47
8	(Scotland) Hamilton Simpson	1:04.71

=== 200m backstroke ===
Pos	Athlete	Time
1	(Wales) Mike Richards	2:14.53
2	(England) Raymond Terrell	2:15.48
3	(Australia) Neil Rogers	2:15.63
4	(England) Jimmy Rogers	2:16.26
5	(England) Clive Rushton	2:16.30
6	(Canada) Bradley Storey	2:16.86
7	(Scotland) Hamilton Simpson	2:17.29
8	(New Zealand) Barnett R. Bond	2:20.01

=== 100m breaststroke ===
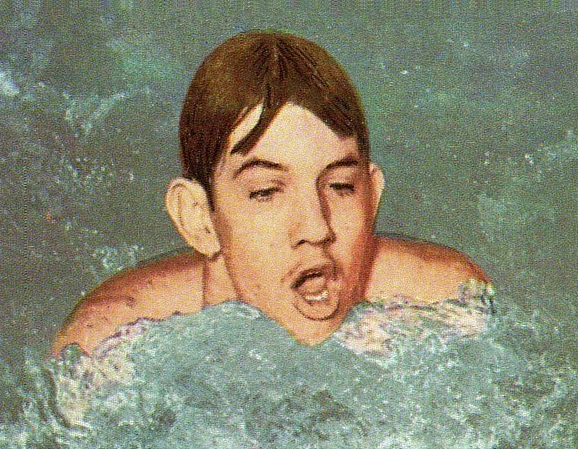
Bill Mahony

Pos	Athlete	Time
1	(Canada) Bill Mahony	1:09.0
2	(Canada) Peter Cross	1:09.4
3	(Australia) Paul Jarvie	1:10.0
4	(Canada) Mike Whitaker	1:10.6
5	(Scotland) David Wilkie	1:11.0
6	(England) Malcolm O'Connell	1:11.8
7	(Northern Ireland) Liam Ball	1:12.3
8	(Scotland) Archibald Young	1:12.3

=== 200m breaststroke ===
Pos	Athlete	Time
1	(Canada) Bill Mahony	2:30.29
2	(Australia) Paul Jarvie	2:30.70
3	(Scotland) David Wilkie	2:32.87
4	(Canada) Peter Cross	2:35.68
5	(Wales) Nigel Johnson	2:35.73
6	(Northern Ireland) Liam Ball	2:36.94
7	(Scotland) Gordon Stirton	2:39.12
8	(Canada) Robert Stoddart	2:39.30

=== 100m butterfly ===
Pos	Athlete	Time
1	(Canada) Byron MacDonald	58.44
2	(Canada) Tom Arusoo	58.98
3	(Canada) Ron Jacks	59.01
4	(Wales) Martyn Woodroffe	59.57
5	(Australia) Neil Rogers	1:00.27
6	(England) Alan Widdowson	1:00.33
7	(England) Michael Bailey	1:00.52
8	(England) Lennie Norris	1:02.27

=== 200m butterfly ===
Pos	Athlete	Time
1	(Canada) Tom Arusoo	2:08.97
2	(Wales) Martyn Woodroffe	2:09.14
3	(Australia) James Findlay	2:09.41
4	(Australia) Richard Michael Wilkinson	2:10.32
5	(Canada) Ron Jacks	2:10.57
6	(England) John Mills	2:12.38
7	(Scotland) Eric Henderson	2:14.08
8	(Canada) Byron MacDonald	2:17.30

=== 200m individual medley ===
Pos	Athlete	Time
1	(Canada) George Smith	2:13.72
2	(Canada) Ken Campbell	2:16.57
3	(Wales) Martyn Woodroffe	2:16.64
4	(Canada) Robert Kasting	2:18.24
5	(England) Raymond Terrell	2:18.55
6	(Australia) James Findlay	2:18.58
7	(Australia) Willem Eduard Portier	2:19.30
8	(New Zealand) Barnett R. Bond	2:23.24

=== 400m individual medley ===
Pos	Athlete	Time
1	(Canada) George Smith	4:48.87
2	(England) Raymond Terrell	4:49.85
3	(Australia) James Findlay	4:51.92
4	(Australia) Willem Eduard Portier	4:53.17
5	(Wales) Martyn Woodroffe	4:53.78
6	(Australia) Graham Windeatt	4:56.45
7	(Canada) Peter Harrower	4:57.61
8	(Canada) Brian O'Sullivan	5:00.78

=== 4×100m freestyle relay ===
Pos	Athlete	Time
1	(Australia) White, Rogers, Wenden, Devenish	3:36.02
2	(Canada) Smith, Hutton, Kasting, Jacks	3:37.65
3	(England) Jarvis, Myall, Windeatt, Terrell	3:41.24
4	(Scotland) Shore, MacGregor, Souter, Brown	3:46.60
5	(New Zealand) Bond, Curry, Treffers, Borrie	3:47.64
6	(Jamaica) Maxwell, Nash, Alexander, Owens	3:53.87
7	(Wales) Williams, Moran, Richards, Maher	3:53.93
8	(Singapore) Chan A, Chan R, Seng H. Soh, Heng	4:00.70

=== 4×200m freestyle relay ===
Pos	Athlete	Time
1	(Australia) White, Rogers, Wenden, Devenish	7:50.77
2	(Canada) Smith, Hutton, Kasting, Jacks	8:00.69
3	(England) Jarvis, Myall, Mills, Terrell	8:10.60
4	(New Zealand) Bond, Curry, Treffers, Borrie	8:11.79
5	(Scotland) Shore, MacGregor, Souter, Brown	8:24.78
6	(Wales) Williams, Simpson, Richards, Maher	8:39.81
7	(Singapore) Chan A, Chan R, Soh, Heng	8:52.12
8	(Jamaica) Maxwell, Nash, Alexander, Owens	8:56.75

=== 4×100m medley relay ===
Pos	Athlete	Time
1	(Canada) MacDonald, Kasting, Mahony, Kennedy	4:01.10
2	(Australia) Findlay, Wenden,Rogers, Jarvie	4:04.55
3	(Wales) Moran, Richards, Woodroffe, Johnson	4:08.05
4	(England) Jarvis, Rogers, Norris, O'Connell	4:09.49
5	(Scotland) Wilkie, Brown, Henderson, Simpson	4:10.74
6	(New Zealand) Bond, Curry, Treffers, Borrie	4:29.55
7	(Papua New Guinea) Martin, Mowen, Cluer, Bostock	4:38.48
8	(Jamaica) Maxwell, Nash, Alexander, Owens	4:39.46

== Finals (women) ==
=== 100m freestyle ===
Pos	Athlete	Time
1	(Canada) Angela Coughlan	1:01.22
2	(Australia) Lynne Watson	1:01.45
3	(Australia) Jennifer Alice Watts	1:01.80
4	(Isle of Man) Alex Jackson	1:01.81
5	(Australia) Debra Cain	1:02.36
6	(Canada) Karen James	1:02.74
7	(New Zealand) Catherine J. Whiting	1:03.73
8	(England) Shelagh Ratcliffe	1:04.32

=== 200m freestyle ===
Pos	Athlete	Time
1	(Australia) Karen Moras	2:09.78
2	(Canada) Angela Coughlan	2:10.83
3	(Isle of Man) Alex Jackson	2:13.52
4	(Australia) Helen Gray	2:13.52
5	(Canada) Karen James	2:14.73
6	(Australia) Jennifer Alice Watts	2:16.32
7	(New Zealand) Judith Wright	2:17.54
8	(Canada) Sandra Smith	2:17.77

=== 400m freestyle ===
Pos	Athlete	Time
1	(Australia) Karen Moras	4:27.38
2	(Australia) Denise Langford	4:31.42
3	(Australia) Robyn Risson	4:39.75
4	(Canada) Angela Coughlan	4:40.21
5	(New Zealand) Judith Wright	4:54.98
6	(Canada) Leslie Cliff	4:46.84
7	(Scotland) Sally Hogg	4:52.03
8	(England) Susan Williams	5:01.86

=== 800m freestyle ===
Pos	Athlete	Time
1	(Australia) Karen Moras	9:02.45
2	(Australia) Helen Gray	9:27.48
3	(Australia) Robyn Risson	9:37.89
4	(New Zealand) Judith Wright	9:47.54
5	(Canada) Leslie Cliff	9:56.05
6	(Scotland) Sally Hogg	9:58.44
7	(Scotland) Andrea Mackie	10:07.32
8	(Canada) Sandra Smith	10:21.14

=== 100m backstroke ===
Pos	Athlete	Time
1	(Australia) Lynne Watson	1:07.10
2	(Australia) Debra Cain	1:07.73
3	(Canada) Donna Gurr	1:08.87
4	(New Zealand) Glenda Stirling	1:09.00
5	(England) Sylvia Platt	1:09.56
6	(England) Jackie Brown	1:09.86
7	(England) Wendy Burrell	1:10.62
8	(Australia) Diana Rickard	1:10.78

=== 200m backstroke ===
Pos	Athlete	Time
1	(Australia) Lynne Watson	2:22.86
2	(Canada) Donna Gurr	2:24.33
3	(Australia) Debra Cain	2:26.02
4	(Australia) Diana Rickard	2:28.23
5	(England) Wendy Burrell	2:28.43
6	(New Zealand) Glenda Stirling	2:29.71
7	(New Zealand) Judith Wright	2:30.59
8	(Canada) Leslie Cliff	2:37.83

=== 100m breaststroke ===
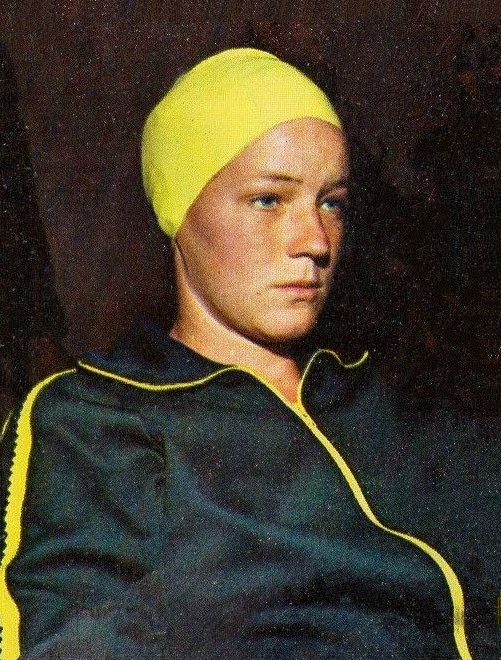
Beverley Whitfield

Pos	Athlete	Time
1	(Australia) Beverley Whitfield	1:17.40
2	(England) Dorothy Harrison	1:17.60
3	(England) Christine Jarvis	1:19.83
4	(Canada) Sylvia Dockerill	1:19.86
5	(Canada) Rene Robson	1:20.63
6	(Wales) Christine Davies	1:21.07
7	(Wales) Pat Wells	1:21.29
8	(Canada) Jane Wright	1:22.33

=== 200m breaststroke ===
Pos	Athlete	Time
1	(Australia) Beverley Whitfield	2:44.12
2	(England) Dorothy Harrison	2:46.18
3	(England) Amanda Radnage	2:50.11
4	(Canada) Rene Robson	2:52.19
5	(Scotland) Pamela Wilson	2:55.58
6	(Canada) Jane Wright	2:55.60
7	(England) Diana Harris	2:57.18

=== 100m butterfly ===
Pos	Athlete	Time
1	(England) Diane Lansley	1:07.90
2	(Canada) Susan Smith	1:08.18
3	(Australia) Allyson Margaret Mabb	1:08.67
4	(New Zealand) Catherine J. Whiting	1:08.71
5	(Australia) Jane Comerford	1:08.96
6	(Canada) Lesley Booth	1:09.29
7	(Australia) Maree Robinson	1:09.29
8	(Canada) Jeanne Warren	1:09.72

=== 200m butterfly ===
Pos	Athlete	Time
1	(Australia) Maree Robinson	2:24.67
2	(Australia) Jane Comerford	2:24.95
3	(Australia) Allyson Margaret Mabb	2:31.09
4	(Canada) Susan Smith	2:31.54
5	(England) Diane Lansley	2:32.54
6	(Scotland) Sally Hogg	2:33.85
7	(Canada) Lesley Booth	2:35.41
8	(England) Gillian Treers	2:36.75

=== 200m individual medley ===
Pos	Athlete	Time
1	(Australia) Denise Langford	2:28.89
2	(England) Shelagh Ratcliffe	2:29.65
3	(Australia) Diana Rickard	2:30.80
4	(Canada) Susan Smith	2:30.82
5	(New Zealand) Susan Hunter	2:33.30
6	(Canada) Shirley Roulston	2:35.64
7	(England) Sharon Anslow	2:36.04
8	(Australia) Gail Neall	2:36.78

=== 400m individual medley ===
Pos	Athlete	Time
1	(Australia) Denise Langford	5:10.74
2	(Australia) Gail Neall	5:15.82
3	(England) Shelagh Ratcliffe	5:17.89
4	(New Zealand) Susan Hunter	5:20.10
5	(Canada) Susan Smith	5:25.85
6	(Canada) Jeanne Warren	5:26.99
7	(New Zealand) Judith Wright	5:27.12
8	(England) Sharon Anslow	5:35.19

=== 4×100m freestyle relay ===
Pos	Athlete	Time
1	(Australia) Cain, Langford, Watts, Watson	4:06.41
2	(Canada) Coughlan, James, Hall, Smith	4:12.16
3	(England) Sutherland, Smith, Allardice, Pickering	4:14.90
4	(New Zealand) Crawford, Wright, Hunter, Whiting	4:15.44
5	(Scotland) Brown, Flynn, Fenton, Hogg	4:23.66
6	(Wales) Price, Davies, Bowen, Jones,	4:27.26
7	(Singapore) Tseng, Keenan, Joo, Chan	4:43.66

=== 4×100m medley relay ===
Pos	Athlete	Time
1	(Australia) Mabb, Whitfield, Langfod, Watson	4:30.66
2	(England) Lansley, Harrison, Smith, Platt	4:38.94
3	(Canada) Coughlan, Gurr, Smith, Dockerill	4:39.65
4	(New Zealand) Stirling, Crawford, Williams, Whiting	4:44.81
5	(Scotland) Armour, Stewart, Brown, Hogg	4:51.49
6	(Wales) Stephens, Davies, Comins, Price	4:59.09
7	(Singapore) Chan, Tan, Joo, Keenan	5:00.71

== See also ==
- Diving at the 1970 British Commonwealth Games
