= Australia at the 1970 British Commonwealth Games =

Australia at the 1970 British Empire Games
- CG code: AUS
- CGA: Australian Commonwealth Games Association

in Edinburgh, Scotland
- Competitors: 107 in 10 sports
- Flag bearers: Opening: Pam Kilborn; Closing: Michael Wenden
- Officials: 25
- Medals Ranked 1st: Gold 36 Silver 24 Bronze 22 Total 82

British Empire Games appearances
- 1930; 1934; 1938; 1950; 1954; 1958; 1962; 1966; 1970; 1974; 1978; 1982; 1986; 1990; 1994; 1998; 2002; 2006; 2010; 2014; 2018; 2022; 2026; 2030

Australia competed at the 1970 British Commonwealth Games in Edinburgh Scotlandfrom 16 to 25 July 1970. It was Australia's ninth appearance at the Commonwealth Games, having competed at every Games since their inception in 1930.

Australia won medals in eight of the ten sports that it entered.

== Medallists ==
The following Australian competitors won medals at the games.

Medal	Name	Sport	Event
Gold	Tony Manning	Athletics	Men's 3000m Steeplechase
Gold	Noel Freeman	Athletics	Men's 20 miles Walk
Gold	Lawrie Peckham	Athletics	Men's High Jump
Gold	Phil May	Athletics	Men's Triple Jump
Gold	Geoff Smith	Athletics	Men's Decathlon
Gold	Raylene Boyle	Athletics	Women's 100m
Gold	Raylene Boyle	Athletics	Women's 200m
Gold	Pam Kilborn	Athletics	Women's 100m Hurdles
Gold	Jennifer Lamy; Pam Kilborn; Marion Hoffman; Raelene Boyle	Athletics	Women's 4 × 100m Relay
Gold	Petra Rivers	Athletics	Women's Javelin Throw
Gold	John Nicholson	Cycling	Men's Sprint
Gold	Gordon Johnson Ron Jonker	Cycling	Men's Tandem
Gold	Don Wagstaff	Diving	Men's 3m Springboard
Gold	Don Wagstaff	Diving	Men's 10m Platform
Gold	Michael Wenden	Swimming	Men's 100m Freestyle
Gold	Michael Wenden	Swimming	Men's 200m Freestyle
Gold	Graham White	Swimming	Men's 400m Freestyle
Gold	Graham Windeatt	Swimming	Men's 1500m Freestyle
Gold	Graham White; Greg Rogers; Michael Wenden; Bill Devenish	Swimming	Men's 4 × 100 m Freestyle Relay
Gold	Graham White; Greg Rogers; Michael Wenden; Bill Devenish	Swimming	Men's 4 × 200 m Freestyle Relay
Gold	Karen Moras	Swimming	Women's 200m Freestyle
Gold	Karen Moras	Swimming	Women's 400m Freestyle
Gold	Karen Moras	Swimming	Women's 800m Freestyle
Gold	Lynne Watson	Swimming	Women's 100m Backstroke
Gold	Lynne Watson	Swimming	Women's 200m Backstroke
Gold	Beverley Whitfield	Swimming	Women's 100m Breaststroke
Gold	Beverley Whitfield	Swimming	Women's 200m Breaststroke
Gold	Maree Robinson	Swimming	Women's 100m Butterfly
Gold	Denise Langford	Swimming	Women's 200m Butterfly
Gold	Denise Langford	Swimming	Women's 400m Individual Medley
Gold	Debra Cain; Denise Langford; Jennifer Watts; Lynne Watson	Swimming	Women's 4 × 100 m Freestyle Relay
Gold	Allyson Mabb; Beverley Whitfield; Denise Langford; Lynne Watson	Swimming	Women's 4 × 100 m Medley Relay
Gold	George Vasil	Weightlifting	Men's Flyweight
Gold	Russell Perry	Weightlifting	Men's Middleweight
Gold	Nicolo Ciancio	Weightlifting	Men's Light Heavyweight
Gold	Ray Rigby	Weightlifting	Men's Super Heavyweight
Silver	Ross Wilson	Athletics	Men's 400m
Silver	Ron Clarke	Athletics	Men's 10,000m
Silver	Malcolm Baird	Athletics	Men's 110m Hurdles
Silver	Bob Gardiner	Athletics	Men's 20 miles Walk
Silver	Phil May	Athletics	Men's Long Jump
Silver	Mick McGrath	Athletics	Men's Triple Jump
Silver	Sandra Brown	Athletics	Women's 400m
Silver	Maureen Caird	Athletics	Women's 100m Hurdles
Silver	Jean Roberts	Athletics	Women's Discus Throw
Silver	Gordon Johnson	Cycling	Men's Sprint
Silver	Danny Clark	Cycling	Men's Individual Pursuit
Silver	Ray Bilney	Cycling	Men's Road Race
Silver	Ernest Simon; Gregory Benko; Bill Ronald	Fencing	Men's Foil Team
Silver	Marion Exelby	Fencing	Women's Foil
Silver	Greg Rogers	Swimming	Men's 100m Freestyle
Silver	Max Tavasci	Swimming	Men's 1500m Freestyle
Silver	Paul Jarvie	Swimming	Men's 200m Breaststroke
Silver	James Findlay; Michael Wenden; Neil Rogers; Paul Jarvie	Swimming	Men's 4 × 100 m Medley Relay
Silver	Lynne Watson	Swimming	Women's 100m Freestyle
Silver	Denise Langford	Swimming	Women's 400m Freestyle
Silver	Helen Gray	Swimming	Women's 800m Freestyle
Silver	Debra Cain	Swimming	Women's 100m Backstroke
Silver	Jane Comerford	Swimming	Women's 200m Butterfly
Silver	Gail Neall	Swimming	Women's 400m Individual Medley
Bronze	Marion Hoffman	Athletics	Women's 100m
Bronze	Cheryl Peasley	Athletics	Women's 800m
Bronze	Jean Roberts	Athletics	Women's Shot Put
Bronze	Peter Butterfield	Boxing	Men's Light Flyweight
Bronze	Robert Murphy	Boxing	Men's Middleweight
Bronze	John Trevorrow	Cycling	Men's Road Race
Bronze	Gaye Morley	Diving	Women's 3m Springboard
Bronze	Gabor Arato; Gregory Benko; Laszlo Tornallyay	Fencing	Men's Sabre Team
Bronze	Bill Devenish	Swimming	Men's 200m Freestyle
Bronze	Greg Rogers	Swimming	Men's 200m Freestyle
Bronze	Greg Brough	Swimming	Men's 400m Freestyle
Bronze	Neil Rogers	Swimming	Men's 200m Backstroke
Bronze	Paul Jarvie	Swimming	Men's 100m Breaststroke
Bronze	James Findlay	Swimming	Men's 200m Butterfly
Bronze	James Findlay	Swimming	Men's 400m Individual Medley
Bronze	Jenny Watts	Swimming	Women's 100m Freestyle
Bronze	Robyn Risson	Swimming	Women's 400m Freestyle
Bronze	Robyn Risson	Swimming	Women's 800m Freestyle
Bronze	Debra Cain	Swimming	Women's 200m Backstroke
Bronze	Allyson Mabb	Swimming	Women's 100m Butterfly
Bronze	Allyson Mabb	Swimming	Women's 200m Butterfly
Bronze	Dianne Rickard	Swimming	Women's 200m Individual Medley

Medals by sport
Sport	1st place, gold medalist(s)	2nd place, silver medalist(s)	3rd place, bronze medalist(s)	
Swimming	18	10	14	42
Athletics	10	9	3	27
Weightlifting	4	0	0	4
Cycling	2	3	1	6
Diving	2	0	1	3
Fencing	0	2	1	3
Boxing	0	0	2	2
Total	36	24	22	82

== Officials ==
Commandant & General Manager – Arthur Tunstall
Assistant General manager – Eric Hayman
Assistant Managers Women – Esna Hopewell, Masie McQuiston
Administrative Officer – Ivan Lund
Advance Party – David McKenzie, Bill Young
Attache – Kenneth Breechin
Medical Officer – Dr Robert Tinning; Masseur – George Saunders
Section Officials – Athletics Manager – Graeme Briggs, Athletics Coaches – Stewart Embling, Jack Pross, William Edgecombe; Badminton Coach/Manager – Ronald Whittle; Lawns Bowls Coach/Manager – Harold Leedham; Boxing Manager/Coach – John Hare; Cycling Manager – Howard Bergstrom, Cycling Coach/Trainer – Harold Johnson; Fencing Manager/Coach – Laurence Smith; Swimming Manager – Archie Steinbeck, Swimming Coaches – Arthur Cusack, Don Talbot; Diving Coach – Thomas Donnet; Weightlifting Manager/Coach – Sam Coffa; Wrestling Manager/Coach -John Bourke

== See also ==
- Australia at the 1968 Summer Olympics
- Australia at the 1972 Summer Olympics
