= Jane Thomson =

Jane Thomson may refer to:

- Jane Thomson (mountaineer) (1858–1944), New Zealand mountaineer
- Jane Thomson (actress) (1827–1901), Australian stage actor and dancer
- Jane Thomson (swimmer) (born 1954), English swimmer

== See also ==
- Jane Thompson (1927–2016), American urbanist, designer and planner
