= Athletics at the 1970 British Commonwealth Games – Women's 200 metres =

Women's 200 metres at the 1970 British Commonwealth Games
- Venue: Meadowbank Stadium, Edinburgh
- Dates: 21 and 22 July 1970

Medalists
gold medal	Raelene Boyle	Australia
silver medal	Alice Annum	Ghana
bronze medal	Margaret Critchley	England

The women's 200 metres event at the 1970 British Commonwealth Games was held on 21 and 22 July at the Meadowbank Stadium in Edinburgh, Scotland. It was the first time that the metric distance was contested at the Games, replacing the 220 yards event.

== Medallists ==
Medallists
Gold	Silver	Bronze
Raelene Boyle; Australia	Alice Annum; Ghana	Margaret Critchley; England

== Results ==
=== Heats ===
==== Qualification for semifinal ====
The first 3 in each heat (Q) and the next 1 fastest (q) qualified for the semifinals.

==== Wind speed ====
Heat 1: ? m/s, Heat 2: +5.7 m/s, Heat 3: ? m/s, Heat 4: +1.0 m/s, Heat 5: +8.8 m/s

Semifinal results
Rank	Heat	Name	Nationality	Time	Notes
1	1	Maureen Tranter	England	23.4	Q
2	1	Stephanie Berto	Canada	23.8	Q
3	1	Penny Hunt	New Zealand	23.9	Q
4	1	Pat Shiels	Wales	24.6	q
5	1	Joan Porter	Trinidad and Tobago	24.7	
6	1	Princess Small	Gambia	26.4	
7	1	Zetha Cofie	Ghana	26.7	
1	2	Margaret Critchley	England	23.5	Q
2	2	Raelene Boyle	Australia	23.59	Q
3	2	Nooline McGarvey	Northern Ireland	24.3	Q
4	2	Janet Maddin	Canada	24.7	
5	2	Hillary Davies	Wales	25.2	
6	2	Claudette Powell	Bahamas	25.7	
7	2	Georgiana Freeman	Gambia	27.5	
1	3	Alice Annum	Ghana	23.4	Q
2	3	Della James	England	24.1	Q
3	3	Maureen McLeish	Scotland	24.9	Q
4	3	Olajumoke Bodunrin	Nigeria	24.9	
5	3	Kahanda Badra	Ceylon	25.7	
6	3	Una Morris	Jamaica	26.0	
1	4	Marion Hoffman	Australia	23.84	Q
2	4	Patty Loverock	Canada	24.0	Q
3	4	Elizabeth Sutherland	Scotland	24.1	Q
4	4	Adlin Mair-Clarke	Jamaica	24.7	
5	4	Linda Teskey	Northern Ireland	25.1	
6	4	Janet Omorogbe	Nigeria	25.2	
1	5	Helen Golden	Scotland	23.4	Q
2	5	Jenny Lamy	Australia	23.58	Q
3	5	Joslyn Holder	Trinidad and Tobago	24.7	Q
4	5	Michelle Smith	Wales	24.9	
5	5	Jane Chikambwe	Zambia	25.6	
	5	Sharon Ochello	Gibraltar	DNS	

=== Semifinals ===
==== Qualification for final ====
The first 4 in each semifinal (Q) qualified directly for the final.

==== Wind speed ====
Heat 1: +3.3 m/s, Heat 2: +3.9 m/s

Semifinal results
Rank	Heat	Name	Nationality	Time	Notes
1	1	Margaret Critchley	England	23.1	Q
2	1	Alice Annum	Ghana	23.2	Q
3	1	Raelene Boyle	Australia	23.39	Q
4	1	Helen Golden	Scotland	23.5	Q
5	1	Elizabeth Sutherland	Scotland	23.9	
6	1	Stephanie Berto	Canada	23.9	
7	1	Nooline McGarvey	Northern Ireland	24.3	
8	1	Pat Shiels	Wales	24.7	
1	2	Jenny Lamy	Australia	23.69	Q
2	2	Maureen Tranter	England	23.8	Q
3	2	Marion Hoffman	Australia	23.82	Q
4	2	Penny Hunt	New Zealand	23.9	Q
5	2	Della James	England	24.1	
6	2	Patty Loverock	Canada	24.3	
7	2	Maureen McLeish	Scotland	24.7	
8	2	Joslyn Holder	Trinidad and Tobago	24.9	

=== Final ===
Held on 22 July

==== Wind speed ====
+4.0 m/s

Final result
Rank	Lane	Name	Nationality	Time	Notes
1st place, gold medalist(s)	4	Raelene Boyle	Australia	22.75	
2nd place, silver medalist(s)	3	Alice Annum	Ghana	22.86	
3rd place, bronze medalist(s)	1	Margaret Critchley	England	23.16	
4	5	Helen Golden	Scotland	23.4	
5	7	Maureen Tranter	England	23.5	
6	6	Jenny Lamy	Australia	23.62	
7	2	Marion Hoffman	Australia	23.79	
8	8	Penny Hunt	New Zealand	23.8	
