= William Price (swimmer) =

English swimmer

Personal information
- Nationality: British (English)
- Born: c.1951 England

Sport
- Sport: Swimming
- Events: Breaststroke; Butterfly; Medley
- Club: Hornchurch ASC

William Price (born 1951) is a retired swimmer who represented England at the Commonwealth Games.

== Biography ==
As a 14-year-old, Price was a proficient butterfly swimmer, completing a mile course in under 25 minutes. He would later specialise in breaststroke but in 1968 won the boys open medley at the 1968 inter-club swimming gala.

He swam for the Hornchurch Amateur Swimming Club and won the 220 yards breaststroke at the 1970 Commonwealth Games trials.

Price subsequently represented the England team at the 1970 British Commonwealth Games in Edinburgh, Scotland, where he participated in the 100 and 200 metres breaststroke events.
