= Sheena Grant =

English swimmer

Personal information
- Nationality: British (English)
- Born: Q3. 1954 Rugby, Warwickshire, England

Sport
- Sport: Swimming
- Event: Backstroke
- Club: Rugby Baths; Wythenshawe SC, Manchester

Sheena M. Grant (born 1954) is a retired female swimmer who represented England at the Commonwealth Games.

== Biography ==
Grant specialised in the backstroke and in 1967 she won three titles at the Midland District swimming championships.

She was a member of the Rugby Baths, where she was a superintendent, before moving to Wythenshawe in Manchester. She was a Great Britain international at both junior and senior level.

Grant represented the England team at the 1970 British Commonwealth Games in Edinburgh, Scotland, where she participated in the 200 metres backstroke event.

In 1972, she studied at Madeley College in Staffordshire.
