= Athletics at the 1970 British Commonwealth Games – Women's 100 metres hurdles =

Women's 100 metres hurdles at the 1970 British Commonwealth Games
- Venue: Meadowbank Stadium, Edinburgh
- Dates: 22 and 23 July 1970

Medalists
gold medal	Pam Kilborn	Australia
silver medal	Maureen Caird	Australia
bronze medal	Christine Bell	England

The women's 100 metres hurdles event at the 1970 British Commonwealth Games was held at the Meadowbank Stadium in Edinburgh, Scotland on 22 and 23 July 1970. It was the first time that this distance was contested at the Games, replacing the 80 metres hurdles.

The winning margin was 0.46 seconds which, as of 2024, remains the only time the women's 100 metres with hurdles was won by more than 0.4 seconds at these games.

== Medallists ==
Medallists
Gold	Silver	Bronze
Pam Kilborn; Australia	Maureen Caird; Australia	Christine Bell; England

== Results ==
=== Heats ===
==== Qualification for final ====
The first 4 in each heat (Q) qualified directly for the final.

==== Wind speed ====
Heat 1: -1.2 m/s, Heat 2: 0.0 m/s

Heats results
Rank	Heat	Name	Nationality	Time	Notes
1	1	Pam Kilborn	Australia	13.48	Q
2	1	Mary Peters	Northern Ireland	14.14	Q
3	1	Susan Scott	England	14.31	Q
4	1	Elizabeth Damman	Canada	14.60	Q
5	1	Lindy Carruthers	Scotland	14.62	
6	1	Wendy Taylor	Canada	15.14	
7	1	Emille Edet	Nigeria	15.48	
1	2	Maureen Caird	Australia	13.79	Q
2	2	Penny McCallum	Australia	13.90	Q
3	2	Christine Bell	England	13.90	Q
4	2	Carmen Smith-Brown	Jamaica	14.52	Q
5	2	Jenny Meldrum	Canada	14.75	
	2	Barbara Corbett	England	DNF	

=== Final ===
==== Wind speed ====
+0.3 m/s

Final results
Rank	Name	Nationality	Time	Notes
1st place, gold medalist(s)	Pam Kilborn	Australia	13.27	
2nd place, silver medalist(s)	Maureen Caird	Australia	13.73	
3rd place, bronze medalist(s)	Christine Bell	England	13.82	
4	Penny McCallum	Australia	13.82	
5	Mary Peters	Northern Ireland	13.88	
6	Susan Scott	England	14.05	
7	Carmen Smith-Brown	Jamaica	14.44	
8	Elizabeth Damman	Canada	14.78	
