= Athletics at the 1970 British Commonwealth Games – Men's 20 miles walk =

Sporting event in Edinburgh, Scotland

Men's 20 miles walk at the 1970 British Commonwealth Games
- Venue: Edinburgh
- Dates: 18 July 1970

Medalists
| gold medal | Noel Freeman | Australia |
| silver medal | Bob Gardiner | Australia |
| bronze medal | Bill Sutherland | Scotland |

The men's 20 miles walk event at the 1970 British Commonwealth Games was held on 18 July in Edinburgh, Scotland.

== Results ==
Final results
| Rank | Name | Nationality | Time | Notes |
|---|---|---|---|---|
| 1st place, gold medalist(s) | Noel Freeman | Australia | 2:33:33 | GR |
| 2nd place, silver medalist(s) | Bob Gardiner | Australia | 2:35:55 | |
| 3rd place, bronze medalist(s) | Bill Sutherland | Scotland | 2:37:24 | |
| 4 | Bob Dobson | England | 2:39:55 | |
| 5 | Ron Wallwork | England | 2:40:10 | |
| 6 | Len Duquemin | Guernsey | 2:42:48 | |
| 7 | Shaun Lightman | England | 2:44:50 | |
| 8 | Felix Cappella | Canada | 2:45:16 | |
| 9 | Alex Oakley | Canada | 2:48:07 | |
| 10 | John Moullin | Guernsey | 2:48:07 | |
| 11 | Richard Rosser | Wales | 2:49:41 | |
| 12 | Karl-Heinz Merschenz | Canada | 2:50:32 | |
| 13 | John Callow | Isle of Man | 2:51:21 | |
| 14 | David Smyth | Northern Ireland | 2:53:49 | |
| 15 | John Cannell | Isle of Man | 2:56:19 | |
| 16 | David Dorey | Guernsey | 3:03:41 | |
| 17 | Nolan Simmons | Trinidad and Tobago | 3:08:23 | |
| 18 | Bala Krishna Subramanian | Singapore | 3:13:22 | |
| 19 | Francis Thomas | Trinidad and Tobago | 3:14:58 | |
| | Ian Hodgkinson | Isle of Man | DNF | |
| | Bachan Singh | India | DQ | |
