= Athletics at the 1970 British Commonwealth Games – Women's 100 metres =

Women's 100 metres at the 1970 British Commonwealth Games
- Venue: Meadowbank Stadium, Edinburgh
- Dates: 17 and 18 July 1970

Medalists
| gold medal | Raelene Boyle | Australia |
| silver medal | Alice Annum | Ghana |
| bronze medal | Marion Hoffman | Australia |

The women's 100 metres event at the 1970 British Commonwealth Games was held on 17 and 18 July at the Meadowbank Stadium in Edinburgh, Scotland. It was the first time that the metric distance was contested at the Games, replacing the 100 yards event.

== Medallists ==
Medallists
| Gold | Silver | Bronze |
|---|---|---|
| Raelene Boyle; Australia | Alice Annum; Ghana | Marion Hoffman; Australia |

== Results ==
=== Heats ===
Held on 17 July

==== Qualification for semifinals ====
The first 3 in each heat (Q) qualified directly for the semifinals.

==== Wind speed ====
Heat 1: +2.2 m/s, Heat 2: +5.7 m/s, Heat 3: +4.9 m/s, Heat 4: +4.3 m/s, Heat 5: +5.4 m/s

Heats results
| Rank | Heat | Name | Nationality | Time | Notes |
|---|---|---|---|---|---|
| 1 | 1 | Jenny Lamy | Australia | 11.81 | Q |
| 2 | 1 | Judith Ayaa | Uganda | 11.92 | Q |
| 3 | 1 | Adlin Mair-Clarke | Jamaica | 11.96 | Q |
| 4 | 1 | Irene Piotrowski | Canada | 12.09 | |
| 5 | 1 | Pat Shiels | Wales | 12.30 | |
| 6 | 1 | Evelyn Urhobo | Nigeria | 12.37 | |
| 7 | 1 | Georgiana Freeman | Gambia | 13.11 | |
| 1 | 2 | Raelene Boyle | Australia | 11.41 | Q |
| 2 | 2 | Helen Golden | Scotland | 11.47 | Q |
| 3 | 2 | Della James | England | 11.65 | Q |
| 4 | 2 | Emilie Edet | Nigeria | 11.81 | |
| 5 | 2 | Hillary Davies | Wales | 12.05 | |
| 6 | 2 | Linda Teskey | Northern Ireland | 12.20 | |
| 7 | 2 | Kahanda Badra | Ceylon | 12.35 | |
| 1 | 3 | Val Peat | England | 11.37 | Q |
| 2 | 3 | Patty Loverock | Canada | 11.64 | Q |
| 3 | 3 | Elizabeth Sutherland | Scotland | 11.65 | Q |
| 4 | 3 | Joan Porter | Trinidad and Tobago | 12.03 | |
| 5 | 3 | Jane Chikambwe | Zambia | 12.33 | |
| 6 | 3 | Sharon Ochello | Gibraltar | 12.92 | |
| | 3 | Adrienne Smyth | Northern Ireland | DNS | |
| 1 | 4 | Alice Annum | Ghana | 11.28 | Q |
| 2 | 4 | Anita Neil | England | 11.51 | Q |
| 3 | 4 | Marion Hoffman | Australia | 11.52 | Q |
| 4 | 4 | Nooline McGarvey | Northern Ireland | 11.88 | |
| 5 | 4 | Joslyn Holder | Trinidad and Tobago | 12.12 | |
| 6 | 4 | Claudette Powell | Bahamas | 12.21 | |
| 7 | 4 | Michelle Smith | Wales | 12.34 | |
| 1 | 5 | Stephanie Berto | Canada | 11.61 | Q |
| 2 | 5 | Penny Hunt | New Zealand | 11.77 | Q |
| 3 | 5 | Carmen Smith-Brown | Jamaica | 12.01 | Q |
| 4 | 5 | Patricia Pennycook | Scotland | 12.03 | |
| 5 | 5 | Olajumoke Bodunrin | Nigeria | 12.07 | |
| 6 | 5 | Princess Small | Gambia | 12.47 | |
| 7 | 5 | Zetha Cofie | Ghana | 12.67 | |

=== Semifinals ===
Held on 18 July

==== Qualification for final ====
The first 4 in each semifinal (Q) qualified directly for the final.

==== Wind speed ====
Heat 1: +4.1 m/s, Heat 2: +4.1 m/s

Final results
| Rank | Heat | Name | Nationality | Time | Notes |
|---|---|---|---|---|---|
| 1 | 1 | Alice Annum | Ghana | 11.29 | Q |
| 2 | 1 | Marion Hoffman | Australia | 11.48 | Q |
| 3 | 1 | Elizabeth Sutherland | Scotland | 11.55 | Q |
| 4 | 1 | Anita Neil | England | 11.64 | Q |
| 5 | 1 | Jenny Lamy | Australia | 11.75 | |
| 6 | 1 | Patty Loverock | Canada | 11.84 | |
| 7 | 1 | Penny Hunt | New Zealand | 11.92 | |
| 8 | 1 | Carmen Smith-Brown | Jamaica | 12.06 | |
| 1 | 2 | Raelene Boyle | Australia | 11.37 | Q |
| 2 | 2 | Val Peat | England | 11.43 | Q |
| 3 | 2 | Helen Golden | Scotland | 11.54 | Q |
| 4 | 2 | Stephanie Berto | Canada | 11.64 | Q |
| 5 | 2 | Della James | England | 11.73 | |
| 6 | 2 | Judith Ayaa | Uganda | 11.93 | |
| 7 | 2 | Adlin Mair-Clarke | Jamaica | 11.99 | |

=== Final ===
Held on 18 July

==== Wind speed ====
+5.3 m/s

Final results
| Rank | Lane | Name | Nationality | Time | Notes |
|---|---|---|---|---|---|
| 1st place, gold medalist(s) | 4 | Raelene Boyle | Australia | 11.26 | |
| 2nd place, silver medalist(s) | 6 | Alice Annum | Ghana | 11.32 | |
| 3rd place, bronze medalist(s) | 1 | Marion Hoffman | Australia | 11.36 | |
| 4 | 7 | Val Peat | England | 11.38 | |
| 5 | 5 | Helen Golden | Scotland | 11.52 | |
| 6 | 3 | Anita Neil | England | 11.54 | |
| 7 | 8 | Stephanie Berto | Canada | 11.63 | |
| 8 | 2 | Elizabeth Sutherland | Scotland | 11.72 | |
