= Sandra Bowman =

British swimmer (born 1967)

Personal information
- Born: 10 April 1967 (age 59) Darlington, England

Sport
- Sport: Swimming

Sandra Bowman (born 10 April 1967) is a British swimmer from Darlington, England.

== Swimming career ==
Bowman competed in the women's 100 metre breaststroke at the 1984 Summer Olympics. She represented England in the 100 and 200 metres breaststroke events, at the 1982 Commonwealth Games in Brisbane, Queensland, Australia. She also won the 1984 and 1985 ASA National Championship title in the 100 metres breaststroke.

== Personal life ==
Her sister Janet Bowman (married name Williams) was also an international swimmer.
