= Clive Rushton =

British swimmer

Personal information
- Nationality: British (English)
- Born: 27 October 1947 Rochdale, England
- Died: 11 June 2017 (aged 69) Indonesia
- Height: 185 cm (6 ft 1 in)
- Weight: 83 kg (183 lb)

Sport
- Sport: Swimming
- Event: Backstroke
- Club: Rochdale SC

Clive Rushton (27 October 1947 – 11 June 2017) was a British international swimmer who competed at the 1972 Summer Olympics. He later became a swimming coach.

== Biography ==
At the ASA National British Championships he won the 1969 110 yards backstroke title and the 1969 220 yards backstroke title.

Rushton represented the England team at the 1970 British Commonwealth Games in Edinburgh, Scotland, where he participated in the 100 and 200 metres backstroke events.

At the 1972 Olympic Games in Munich, he competed in the men's 100 metre backstroke.

Rushton died from cancer on 11 June 2017 at the age of 69.
