= Jane Thomson (swimmer) =

English swimmer

Personal information
- Nationality: British (English)
- Born: November 1954 Wolverhampton, England

Sport
- Sport: Swimming
- Event: Medley
- Club: Wolverhampton SC

Jane M. Thomson (born November 1954) is a retired female swimmer who represented England at the Commonwealth Games.

== Biography ==
Thomson swam for Wolverhampton Swimming Club and specialised in the individual medley, so was proficient in all strokes.

In March 1970, after success at the international swimming tirals she was invited to join the British national junior training squad.

Thomson represented the England team at the 1970 British Commonwealth Games in Edinburgh, Scotland, where she participated in the 200 metres individual medley event.

Shortly after the Games in August, Thomson announced her international retirement in order to concentrate on her studies at Tettenhall High School but received a call-up for the pre-Olympic training squad, forcing a change of mind. Thomson continued to represent Great Britain throughout 1971 but did not make the 1972 Olympic team.
