= Dorothy Harrison =

English swimmer

Personal information
- Full name: Dorothy Elizabeth Harrison
- National team: Great Britain
- Born: 16 March 1950 (age 76)
- Height: 1.62 m (5 ft 4 in)
- Weight: 51 kg (112 lb; 8.0 st)

Sport
- Sport: Swimming
- Strokes: Breaststroke
- Club: Hartlepool SC
Medal record
Women's swimming
Representing Great Britain
European Championships
Bronze medal – third place	1970 Barcelona	200 m breaststroke
Representing England
British Commonwealth Games
Silver medal – second place	1970 Edinburgh	100 m breaststroke
Silver medal – second place	1970 Edinburgh	200 m breaststroke
Silver medal – second place	1970 Edinburgh	4×100 m medley

Dorothy Elizabeth Harrison (born 16 March 1950) is a retired English international swimmer.

== Swimming career ==
She represented Great Britain in the Olympic Games and European championships and won a bronze medal in the 200-metre breaststroke at the 1970 European Aquatics Championships. She competed in five breaststroke and medley relay events at the 1968 and 1972 Summer Olympics; her best achievements were sixth place in the 4×100-metre medley relay in 1968 and eighth place in the 100-metre breaststroke in 1972. In the medley relay she competed with Margaret Auton, Wendy Burrell and Alexandra Jackson.

She also represented England and won three silver medals in the 100 and 200 metres breaststroke events and the 4 x 100 metres medley relay, at the 1970 British Commonwealth Games in Edinburgh, Scotland.

At the ASA National British Championships she won the 100 metres breaststroke title in 1971 and the 220 yards/200 metres breaststroke titles in 1969, 1970 and 1971.
