= Norman Hook (bowls) =

English bowls player

Personal information
- Nationality: British (English)
- Born: 27 October 1928 Stroud, Gloucestershire
- Died: 3 October 2011 (aged 82) Stroud, Gloucestershire

Sport
- Club: Victory Park BC

Norman Robert Hook (27 October 1928 – 3 October 2011), was an English international lawn bowler.

== Bowls career ==
Hook bowled for Victory Park Bowls Club in Gloucestershire and was an England international from 1968 until 1970.

He represented England in the rinks (fours), at the 1970 British Commonwealth Games in Edinburgh, Scotland, with Harold Powell, Bobby Stenhouse and Cliff Stroud.
