= Shelagh Ratcliffe =

British swimmer

Personal information
- Born: 25 January 1952 (age 74) Isle of Man
- Height: 1.69 m (5 ft 7 in)
- Weight: 68 kg (150 lb)

Sport
- Sport: Swimming
- Club: Everton Swimming Club, Liverpool
Medal record
Women's swimming
Representing England
British Commonwealth Games
Silver medal – second place	1970 Edinburgh	200 m medley
Bronze medal – third place	1970 Edinburgh	400 m medley
Representing Great Britain
European Championships
Bronze medal – third place	1970 Barcelona	200 m medley
Bronze medal – third place	1970 Barcelona	400 m medley

Shelagh Hudson Ratcliffe (born 25 January 1952) is a retired British swimmer.

== Early life ==
In 1972 she swam for Everton SC. She originated from Fairfield, Liverpool, and attended Calder High School for Girls.

== Swimming career ==
Ratcliffe was born on the Isle of Man and later moved to Liverpool. She won bronze medals in the 200 metres and 400 metres medley at the 1970 European Aquatics Championships. She competed in these events at the 1968 and 1972 Summer Olympics and finished fifth in the 400 m medley in 1968.

She also represented England and won a silver medal in the 200 metres medley and a bronze medal in the 400 metres medley, at the 1970 British Commonwealth Games in Edinburgh, Scotland. At the ASA National British Championships she won the 1969 220 yards freestyle title and was eight times champion in the medley events winning both the 220 yards medley and 440 yards medley titles in 1967, 1968, 1969 and 1970.

She retired in 1973 to pursue a career in business.

== Personal life ==
In the late 1960s and early 1970s, Ratcliffe was practicing yoga and was a vegetarian. Her father was a yoga teacher.

== See also ==
- List of Commonwealth Games medallists in swimming (women)
