= Gail Neall =

Australian swimmer

Personal information
- National team: Australia
- Born: 2 August 1955 (age 70) Sydney
- Height: 1.63 m (5 ft 4 in)
- Weight: 52 kg (115 lb)

Sport
- Sport: Swimming
- Strokes: Medley, butterfly
Medal record
Women's swimming
Representing Australia
Olympic Games
| Gold medal – first place | 1972 Munich | 400 m medley |
Commonwealth Games
| Silver medal – second place | 1970 Edinburgh | 400 m medley |
| Bronze medal – third place | 1974 Christchurch | 200 m butterfly |

Gail Neall (born 2 August 1955), also known by her married name Gail Yeo, is an Australian former medley swimmer who raced in the 1970s. She won a gold medal in the 400-metre individual medley at the 1972 Summer Olympics in world record time.

== Early years ==
The youngest of four children, Neall's family moved to Brisbane in the year of her birth. Her father Allan was a graduate of the University of Queensland and had found a job with an oil company. Her brother was 13 years older than she was, while her two sisters were twelve and eight years her senior, respectively. Her family had a backyard pool, something that was rather uncommon during the 1950s in Australia. Neall was initially timid, and would not take her feet from the bottom of the pool. When asked about who taught her to swim, she would attribute it to her mother Thelma, who could not swim at all.

Neall had her first swimming instruction from Marlene Town, a former Queensland champion. Despite her progress, her school swimming coach did not regard her as suitable for the Nundah Primary School team, and went to the trouble of filming her breaststroke technique to show the other children what not to do. Neall's father cited his daughter's personal trait of wanting to prove her sceptics wrong as a major attribute in her future success. He took her to Arthur Cusack at Brisbane's Centenary Pool, and only two weeks later, she came third in the under-9 division of the 50-metre freestyle at the State Schools Championships.

Soon after, the family moved back to Sydney, and Gail began to swim under Harold Reid at the Frank O'Neill pool at Pymble, New South Wales. In 1965, she joined the Ryde Amateur Swimming Club, which was sold in 1966 to Forbes Carlile. Carlile was regarded as the leading Australian coach of the time, so she was integrated into his squad.

== Success ==
Neall quickly encountered success, winning her first New South Wales Championship in her age division of the backstroke at 11 in 1966. Still aged 11, she made her debut in the open State Championships, and came third in the 200-metre backstroke to qualify for the 1967 Australian Championships in Adelaide. From her debut until her retirement in 1974, she made the final in every event in which she competed.

In mid-1968, Neall broke her arm in a gymnastics class at school and was sidelined for more than three months. She returned in the 1969 New South Wales Winter Championships, where she did well enough to win selection for a state team tour of New Zealand. In her first overseas meet, she won the 400-metre freestyle after defeating Karen Moras and Denise Langford. Neall started the 1969–70 summer swimming season on a poor note. She claimed no victories in the State Championships and was disqualified in the 400-metre individual medley after breaking a state record in the heats. Three silvers and bronze saw her progress to Adelaide for the national under-16 championships. She won the 400-metre individual medley, setting the fastest time in the Commonwealth for the year to date. She showed a wide range of skills by winning bronze in the 200-metre butterfly and a silver in the 200-metre individual medley.

The 1970 Australian Championships doubled as the selection trials for the 1970 British Commonwealth Games in Edinburgh. Neall came third and second in the 200 and 400-metre respectively to gain selection, despite having yet to claim a national title.

Neall's stature and physique was extremely small for an elite swimmer, measuring 160 cm and 50.8 kg. Known for her stroke versatility in the medley and her stamina, her small stature led her to be dubbed "the mighty mite". She had converted from concentrating on the butterfly event to medley swimming, despite difficulties with the breaststroke leg. In Edinburgh, Scotland, she claimed a silver medal in the 400-metre individual medley, finishing more than five seconds behind fellow Australian Denise Langford. However, she had made significant improvements, cutting more than eight seconds from her heat time to finish in a time of 5 m 15.82 s. Her performance in the 200-metre individual medley was not as strong. She had come second in her heat in a time of 2 m 34.32 s to qualify for the final but swam slower in a time of 2 m 36.78 s to place eighth.

Neall continued her rise after the Commonwealth Games by winning the medley double and a silver medal in the 200-metre butterfly at the 1971 New South Wales Championships. At the winter nationals, she won the 400-metre medley and took silver in both the 200-metre medley and the 200-metre backstroke. She finally broke through for her first title at the 1971 Australian Championships in Hobart, taking the 400-metre individual medley in a time of 5 m 16.5 s.

In 1971, she switched to the coaching of Don Talbot at his Hurstville squad, after her parents became increasingly uncomfortable with Carlile, perceiving that he did not have confidence in her ability to win at the highest level. Talbot had overseen her training as the national coach for the Commonwealth Games in 1970. Neall's father felt that his daughter's performance improved as a result of Talbor's individual attention to his swimmers, thereby building their confidence. The switch also meant a larger burden on the family; Hurstville was 32 km from the family home.

== Olympics ==
In 1972, Neall had her most successful Australian Championships, winning the 200-metre butterfly and the 400-metre individual medley in times of 2 m 23.2 s and 5 m 9.8 s respectively and coming second in the 200-metre individual medley. She was selected for the 1972 Summer Olympics in Munich, and travelled to the team training camp in Brisbane. She sealed her place in the 200-metre butterfly by winning a trial race during the camp, and was entered in both the individual medleys.

Neall missed the final in the 200-metre individual medley, her first event, after swimming a personal best of 2 m 29.6 s in coming third in her heat. She placed 14th overall, more than 2.5 s outside the qualifying limit.

Neall was considered an outsider in her pet event, the 400-metre individual medley, with Americans Jennifer Bartz, Lyn Vidali and Mary Montgomery, and Canadian Leslie Cliff fancied to take the gold medal. Neall had a mediocre heat swim; although she won it in a time of 5 m 11.89 s, subsequent heats were faster and she was only sixth fastest. Evelyn Stolze of East Germany was the quickest qualifier in an Olympic record 5 s 6.96 s and Neall was more than three seconds slower than the third fastest qualifier.

Neall initially contested the lead in the butterfly leg with Bartz and Vidali, taking the lead in the second 50 metres of the first stroke after the two Americans had led in the first lap. Neall turned at the end of the butterfly in first place in a time of 1 m 8.64 s. She extended her lead to a bodylength at the end of the backstroke leg, before going into the breaststroke, her weakest leg. Despite being expected to falter in the breaststroke, Neall managed to maintain parity, and still narrowly led at the change into freestyle with a split of 3 m 55.51 s, having repelled attack by Cliff and Bartz. Cliff attacked in the first half of the freestyle leg and took a narrow lead at the final turn, before Neall fought back to draw level with 30 metres to go. The pair stroked in tandem for the next ten metres before Neall drew away to win in a time of 5 m 02.97 s. It was a new world record, and improved on her personal best by 7 seconds as the top four finishers all lowered the world record. Neall had defeated Cliff by 0.60 s. Novella Calligaris took bronze, 1.02 s in arrears.

Her victory from lane seven was emulated by Australia's two other female individual swimming gold medallists at Munich: Shane Gould and Beverley Whitfield had won the 200-metre individual medley and 200-metre breaststroke from lane seven.

In the 200-metre butterfly event, Neall qualified for the final, scraping in as the slowest qualifier after posting a time of 2 m 23.21 s to place third in her heat. In the final, she was unable to challenge the winner, Karen Moe, from the United States, who broke her own world record. Neall came seventh in a time of 2 m 21.88 s, more than five seconds outside the medals.

She was a schoolmate of fellow Munich gold medal winning swimmer Shane Gould at Turramurra High School on the north shore of Sydney. Turramurra High School has named two of their sporting houses after Gail Neall and Shane Gould. Overshadowed, she did not receive a civic reception from the local council upon her return to Australia. Her performance at Munich won her the Helms Award as Australasia's outstanding athlete for 1972.

== Post-Olympics ==
After the Olympics, Neall's partnership with Talbot was broken when he took up a coaching position in Canada. She started training with his assistant Ruth Everuss, but the pair did not produce the desired results. Neall took an extended break from swimming to complete her Higher School Certificate and won a scholarship to Kuring-gai College of Advanced Education to train as a primary school teacher. The interrupted swimming regime saw a decline in her times at the 1973 Australian Championships in Adelaide, as she could defend neither of her titles. She placed second in the 400-metre individual medley and third in the 200-metre butterfly. The selectors persisted with her and chose her for the International Coca-Cola Meet in London and the World Championship in Belgrade, Yugoslavia. After the European trip, Neall went to Thunder Bay in Canada to train with Talbot for three months. She competed in the Canadian season, setting three Canadian all-comers records.

In 1974, she returned to Australia and resumed training with Gathercole. She won both medley events and the 200-metre butterfly and was selected for the Commonwealth Games.

At the 1974 Commonwealth Games in Christchurch, New Zealand, Neall had faded from her peak times. Although she won a bronze in the 200-metre butterfly in 2 m 21.66 s, her performance in the 400-metre individual medley was 10 seconds slower than her personal best, and left her last in the final. She retired after returning to Australia.

Neall met her farmer-grazier husband while teaching in rural New South Wales, and they settled in Merrygoen, New South Wales. She ceased her involvement in swimming as there was no pool in the vicinity of the area, which was also frequently drought-stricken. The couple had four children, including twins.

One of the pools at the Ryde Swimming Complex was named after her. She was inducted into the Sport Australia Hall of Fame in 1990.

== See also ==
- List of members of the International Swimming Hall of Fame
- List of Olympic medalists in swimming (women)
- List of Commonwealth Games medallists in swimming (women)
- World record progression 400 metres individual medley

== Notes ==
Records
| Preceded by Claudia Kolb | Women's 400-metre individual medley world record holder (long course); 9 July 1972 – 18 August 1973 | Succeeded by Angela Franke |
