= Tony Davidson =

British swimmer

Personal information
- Nationality: British (English)
- Born: c.1951 England

Sport
- Sport: Swimming
- Event: Backstroke
- Club: Newcastle-under-Lyme SC

Anthony Davidson (born c.1951) is a former international swimmer from England who competed at two Commonwealth Games. He specialised in the backstroke.

== Biography ==
Davidson was educated in Eccleshall and was a member of the Newcastle-under-Lyme Swimming Club. He was the 1965 national junior 110 yards backstroke champion, won the junior 200 yards freestyle title at the 1965 North Midland Championships and won the English Schools' 1966 junior backstroke title.

Davidson represented the England team at the 1966 British Empire and Commonwealth Games in Kingston, Jamaica, where he reached the final of the 110 yards backstroke event.

Four years later he represented the England team again at the 1970 British Commonwealth Games in Edinburgh, Scotland, where he participated in the 100 metres backstroke event,.
