= Gillian Treers =

British swimmer

Personal information
- Nationality: British (English)
- Born: 7 February 1952 (age 74) London, England
- Height: 159 cm (5 ft 3 in)
- Weight: 57 kg (126 lb)

Sport
- Sport: Swimming
- Event: Butterfly
- Club: Beckenham Ladies SC

Gillian S. Treers (born 8 February 1952) is a British former swimmer who competed at the 1968 Summer Olympics..

== Biography ==
At the 1968 Olympic Games in Mexico City, she participated in two events.

Treers represented the England team at the 1970 British Commonwealth Games in Edinburgh, Scotland, where she participated in the 100 and 200 metres butterfly events.
