= Ivan Myall =

English swimmer

Personal information
- Nationality: British (English)
- Born: 1947 (age 78–79) Essex, England

Sport
- Sport: Swimming
- Event: Freestyle
- Club: City of Southampton SC
Medal record
Men's swimming
Representing England
Commonwealth Games
Bronze medal – third place	1970 Edinburgh	4×100 m freestyle
Bronze medal – third place	1970 Edinburgh	4×200 m freestyle

Ivan J. Myall (born 1947), is a male former swimmer who competed for England at the Commonwealth Games.

== Biography ==
Myall attended the University of Southampton.

Myall represented the England team at the 1970 British Commonwealth Games in Edinburgh, Scotland, where he participated in the 4 x 100 and 4 x 200 metres freestyle relays, winning two bronze medals.
