= Michael Richards (swimmer) =

Welsh swimmer

Personal information
- Nickname: Mike
- National team: Great Britain
- Born: 13 September 1950 (age 75) Newport, Wales
- Height: 1.83 m (6 ft 0 in)
- Weight: 70 kg (150 lb; 11 st)

Sport
- Sport: Swimming
- Strokes: Backstroke
- Club: Nottingham Northern SC
Medal record
Men's swimming
Representing Great Britain
Universiade
Bronze medal – third place	1970 Turin	100 m backstroke
Bronze medal – third place	1970 Turin	200 m backstroke
Representing Wales
Commonwealth Games
Gold medal – first place	1970 Edinburgh	200 m backstroke
Silver medal – second place	1970 Edinburgh	100 m backstroke
Bronze medal – third place	1970 Edinburgh	4x100 m medley relay

Michael J. "Mike" Richards (born 13 September 1950) is a male Welsh former competitive swimmer.

== Swimming career ==
Richards represented the Welsh team at the 1970 British Commonwealth Games in Edinburgh, Scotland, where he competed in the three events. He participated in the 100 metres backstroke and 200 metres backstroke and the 4x100 medley relay and won three medals, a gold, silver and bronze.

Richards represented Great Britain at the 1972 Summer Olympics in Munich, Germany. Richards advanced to the semi-finals of the men's 100-metre backstroke, and posted a time of 1:01.27, finishing 15th overall. At the ASA National British Championships he won the 100 metres backstroke title twice (1970, 1971) and the 200 metres backstroke title twice (1970, 1971).

He was a member of the Nottingham Northern Swimming Club and studied civil engineering at the University of Nottingham.

== See also ==
- List of Commonwealth Games medallists in swimming (men)
