= Margaret Auton =

British swimmer

Personal information
- Born: 9 February 1951 (age 75) Hartlepool, England

Sport
- Sport: Swimming
- Club: Hartlepool Swimming Club

Margaret M Auton (born 9 February 1951) is a female British former swimmer.

== Swimming career ==
Auton competed in three events at the 1968 Summer Olympics. She was in the medley relay and they were placed sixth. She competed with Dorothy Harrison, Wendy Burrell and Alexandra Jackson. At the ASA National British Championships she won the 110 yards butterfly title in 1968 and 1969 and the 220 yards butterfly title in 1968.
