= Lesley Allardice =

British swimmer

Personal information
- Nationality: British
- Born: 8 July 1957 (age 69) Kirkcaldy, Scotland
- Height: 162 cm (5 ft 4 in)
- Weight: 50 kg (110 lb)

Sport
- Sport: Swimming
- Strokes: Freestyle
- Club: Hornchurch SC; Havering SC
Medal record
Women's swimming
Representing England
British Commonwealth Games
Bronze medal – third place	1970 Edinburgh	4×100 m freestyle
Bronze medal – third place	1974 Christchurch	4×100 m freestyle

Lesley Allardice (born 8 July 1957) is a retired British international swimmer who competed at the 1972 Summer Olympics.

== Biography ==
Although Scottish born, Allardice represented the England team at the 1970 British Commonwealth Games in Edinburgh, Scotland, where she participated in the 200 metres freestyle and the 4 x 100 metres freestyle relay, winning a bronze medal.

At the 1972 Olympic Games in Munich, she participated in four events.

Two years later she repeated the success by winning another bronze medal in the 4 x 100 metres freestyle relay, at the 1974 British Commonwealth Games in Christchurch, New Zealand.

She is a two times winner of the British Championship in 100 metres freestyle (1972-1973), four times winner of the 200 metres freestyle (1970-1973) and was the 400 metres freestyle champion in 1971.
