= Harold Powell (bowls) =

English bowls player

Personal information
- Nationality: British (English)
- Born: c.1919

Sport
- Sport: Lawn bowls
- Club: Farnborough British Legion BC

Harold Powell was an English international lawn bowler.

== Bowls career ==
Powell was the champion of England in 1958 (singles) and 1975 (triples) and an England international from 1959 until 1970. He represented England several times at the Home Countries' International Championships, including skip.

He represented England in the rinks (fours), at the 1970 British Commonwealth Games in Edinburgh, Scotland, with Norman Hook, Bobby Stenhouse and Cliff Stroud.

He bowled for Farnborough British Legion BC and was a cycle shop manager by trade.
