= Sharon Anslow =

English swimmer

Personal information
- Nationality: British (English)
- Born: 22 December 1952 Lambeth, London, England

Sport
- Sport: Swimming
- Event: Medley
- Club: Southwark SC

Sharon Anslow (born 1952) is a retired female swimmer who represented England at the Commonwealth Games.

== Biography ==
Anslow swam for Southwark Swimming Club and specialised in the individual medley. Despite finishing second in the 1969 British trials for the international match against Germany, she was overlooked for the meet.

In August 1970, she was chosen to represent Great Britain at the European Championships and won the 1971 British short course 400 metres medley title.

Anslow represented the England team at the 1970 British Commonwealth Games in Edinburgh, Scotland, where she participated in the 200 and 400 metres individual medley events.
