= Lennie Norris =

English swimmer

Personal information
- Nationality: British (English)
- Born: 1951 (age 74–75) Surrey, England

Sport
- Sport: Swimming
- Event: Butterfly
- Club: Barracuda SC, Wimbledon

Leonard M. Norris (born 1951), is a male former swimmer who competed for England at the Commonwealth Games.

== Biography ==
Norris became the British champion in 1967 when he won the 110 yards butterfly title at the ASA National British Championships in Blackpool.

Norris represented the England team at the 1970 British Commonwealth Games in Edinburgh, Scotland, where he participated in the 100m butterfly and relay events.

He swam for the Barracuda Swimming Club, Wimbledon.
