= Sylvia Platt =

English swimmer

Personal information
- Nationality: British (English)
- Born: 1950 (age 75–76) Hyde, Greater Manchester, England

Sport
- Sport: Swimming
- Event: Backstroke
- Club: Hyde Seal SC
Medal record
Women's swimming
Representing England
Commonwealth Games
Silver medal – second place	1970 Edinburgh	4×100 m medley

Sylvia M. Platt (born 1951), is a female former swimmer who competed for England.

== Biography ==
Platt represented the England team at the 1970 British Commonwealth Games in Edinburgh, Scotland, where she participated in the three swimming events, winning a silver medal.

Platt represented the Hyde Seal Swimming Club.

At the 1970 British Commonwealth Games in Edinburgh, Platt met fellow international swimmer Jimmy Rogers. They became engaged on Christmas Day 1970 and married in 1971.
