= Lincoln Minster School =

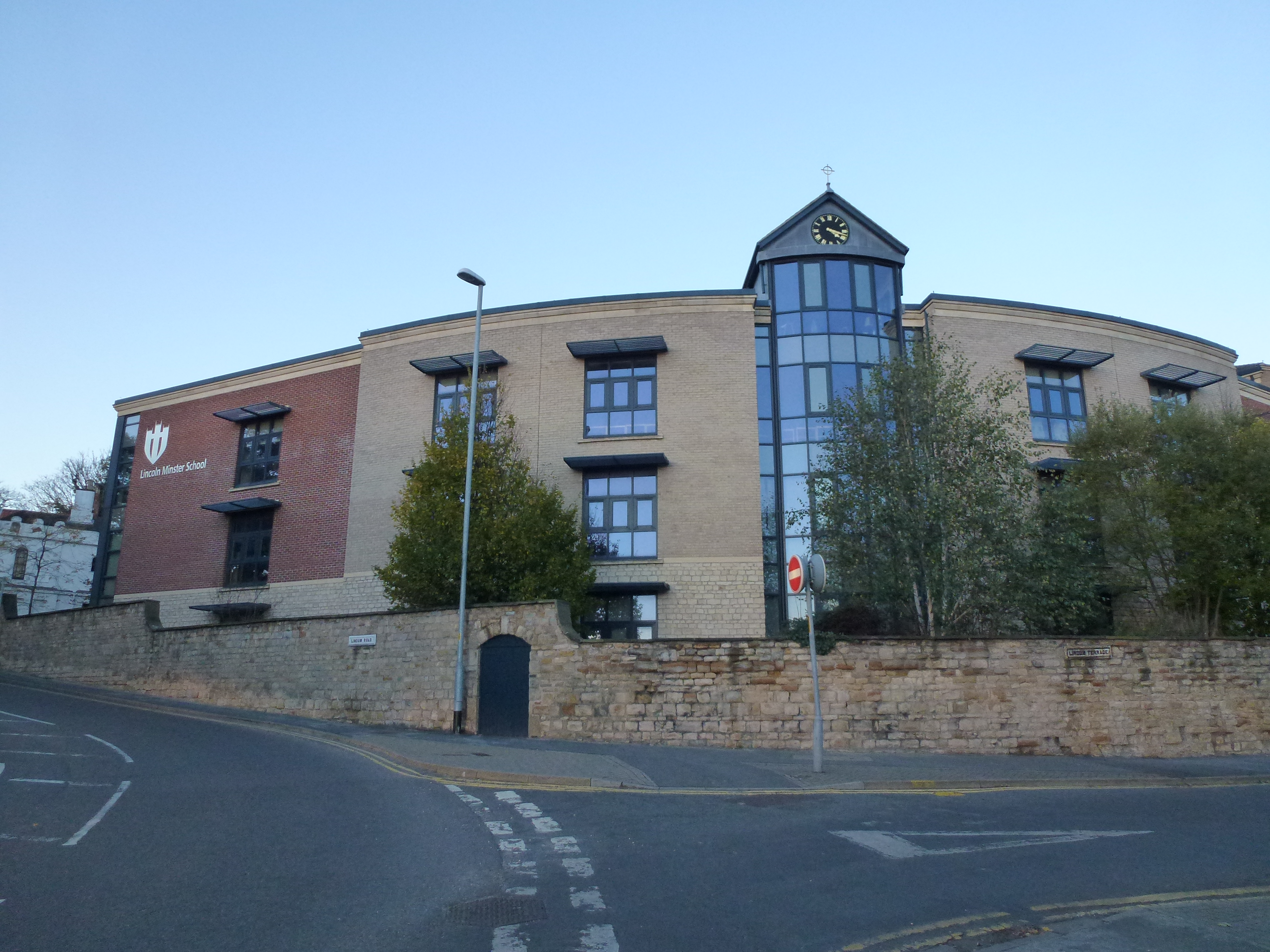

Location
- Upper Lindum Street; Lincoln, Lincolnshire, LN2 5RW; England
- Coordinates: 53.23413°N 0.53094°W

Information
- Type: Private day school
- Motto: An education for life
- Religious affiliation: Church of England
- Established: 1996
- Local authority: Lincolnshire
- Department for Education URN: 120724 Tables
- Acting headteacher: Charlotte Brigden
- Gender: Coeducational
- Age: 5 to 18
- Enrolment: 500–600
- Houses: Learoyd; Jackson; Gibson; Nettleton
- Affiliation: United Church Schools Trust
- Website: https://www.lincolnminsterschool.co.uk/

Lincoln Minster School (known locally as "LMS" or "The Minster") is a private co-educational day school in Lincoln, England.

It comprises two schools: the preparatory, and senior school. While the school is now open to pupils from the community it continues to educate a small number of the choristers of Lincoln Cathedral, though the formal association with the cathedral was ended by Lincoln Minster School in 2016 and most choristers are now drawn from other local schools. It is a member of the United Church Schools Trust and the Choir Schools' Association.

== History ==
In 1265 Richard of Gravesend, Bishop of Lincoln, decreed that there should be twelve boys, two of whom were to be incense bearers, living in one house under a master who appropriated certain revenues for their support. They were to be taught lessons in their house in addition to their choral duties. Even before the Bishop's ordinance, boys were known to have been taught music in the Cathedral Close.

Lincoln Minster School was formed in 1996 with the amalgamation of four schools:

- The Cathedral School for the choristers (girls and boys) of Lincoln Minster
- St Joseph's School for Girls, a day and boarding school
- Stonefield House School which taught children up to the age of 16

In 2011 St Mary's Preparatory School merged with the school to become its preparatory department.

== Music ==
Pupils are encouraged to be involved in music. There are opportunities to perform in school concerts or lead worship services. Many are selected for the National Youth Choirs of Great Britain, National Children's Orchestra and other groups.

== Boarding ==
Across all the schools there used to be four boarding houses but all 4 are now permanently closed:

- Hillside (Senior boys)
- Lindum View (Junior boys)
- Eastgate (Senior Girls)
- James Street (Junior boys and girls)

== Literature ==
A detailed history of the Lincoln Grammar School from its foundation to 1902 is provided by:

- Leach A. F. in Page W. (ed), (1906), The Victoria History of the County of Lincoln Vol II, pp 421–449.

== Notable alumni ==
- Eliza Butterworth — actress, The Last Kingdom(2022)

=== St Joseph's School for Girls ===
- Jean Birkett — 1980s national swimmer
- Diana Sutherland — swimmer in the 1972 Summer Olympics; won bronze in the 4x100m freestyle relay at the 1970 British Commonwealth Games
