= Kathryn Smith (swimmer) =

English swimmer

Personal information
- Nationality: British (English)
- Born: c.1952

Sport
- Sport: Swimming
- Event: Freestyle
- Club: Coalville Lifesaving Club
Medal record
Women's swimming
Representing England
Commonwealth Games
Silver medal – second place	1970 Edinburgh	4×100 m medley
Bronze medal – third place	1970 Edinburgh	4×100 m freestyle

Kathryn M. Smith (born c.1952) is a retired female swimmer who represented England at the Commonwealth Games.

== Biography ==
Smith was a member of the Coalville Lifesaving Club.

Smith represented the England team at the 1970 British Commonwealth Games in Edinburgh, Scotland, where she participated in the 100 metres freestyle and the relay events, winning two medals.
