= Alice Jones (swimmer) =

American swimmer

Alice Catherine Jones
Personal information
- Born: Cincinnati, Ohio United States

Sport
- Sport: Swimming
- Strokes: Butterfly
- College team: Cincinnati Marlins
- Coach: Paul Bergen (Marlins)
Medal record
Representing United States
Pan American Games
Silver medal – second place	1971 Cali	200m butterfly

Alice Jones is an American international swimmer who swam for the Cincinnati Marlins under Hall of Fame Coach Paul Bergen.

Jones was born in Cincinnati, Ohio to Mr. and Mrs. Homer M. Jones. At the 1970 Amateur Athletic Union (AAU) Outdoor Swimming Championships, Jones won two gold medals, setting world records in the 100- and 200-meter butterfly. She was named World Swimmer of the Year in 1970 by Swimming World.

The next summer, at the 1971 Pan American Games in Cali, Colombia, from 30 July to 13 August 1971, she won a silver medal in the 200-meter butterfly, with a time of 2:28.3.

On June 15, 1974, she married Robert Louis Smithers of Sarasota in Cincinnati.

Jones attended the University of Cincinnati.

Records
Preceded by Ada Kok	Women's 100-meter butterfly world record-holder (long course); August 20, 1970 – July 21, 1972	Succeeded by Mayumi Aoki
Preceded by Karen Moe	Women's 200-meter butterfly world record-holder (long course); August 22, 1970 – August 7, 1971	Succeeded by Karen Moe
Preceded by Kaye Hall; Catie Ball; Ellie Daniel; Susan Pedersen	Women's 4 x 100-meter medley relay world record-holder (long course); September 1, 1970 – September 11, 1971; With: Susie Atwood; Kim Brecht; Cindy Schilling	Succeeded by Susie Atwood; Claudia Clevenger; Ellie Daniel; Linda Johnson
Awards
Preceded by Shane Gould	Swimming World; World Swimmer of the Year; 1970	Succeeded by Debbie Meyer
