= Joanne Seymour =

English swimmer

Personal information
- Nationality: English
- Born: 1965 (age 59–60) Warwickshire

Sport
- Club: Camp Hill Edwardians

Joanne Seymour (born 1965) is a former swimmer who competed for England.

== Early life ==
She came from Quinton, Birmingham.

== Career ==
Seymour became national champion in 1982 when she won the 1982 ASA National Championship title in the 100 metres breaststroke.

Seymour represented England in the 100 metres breaststroke and 200 metres individual medley events, at the 1982 Commonwealth Games in Brisbane, Queensland, Australia.
