= Barbara Corbett =

British athlete

Personal information
- Nationality: British (English)
- Born: 20 February 1952

Sport
- Sport: Athletics
- Event: 100 metres hurdles
- Club: Epsom & Ewell Harriers

Barbara Corbett (born 20 February 1952) is a former international athlete who competed at the Commonwealth Games.

== Biography ==
Corbett was a member of the Epsom and Ewell Harriers and specialised in the hurdles, specifically over 100 metres. She also ran for the Midlands and Southern Counties at representative level.

In 1969 she set an English Schools' record of 15 seconds but was beaten into second place the following year, shortly before the Commonwealth Games.

Corbett subsequently represented the England team at the 1970 British Commonwealth Games in Edinburgh, Scotland, where she competed in the 100 metres hurdles event.
