= Diana Sutherland =

British swimmer

Personal information
- Nationality: British (English)
- Born: 1 November 1954 (age 71)
- Height: 169 cm (5 ft 7 in)
- Weight: 67 kg (148 lb)

Sport
- Sport: Swimming
- Event: Freestyle / Backstroke
- Club: Cheam Ladies SC
Medal record
Women's swimming
Representing England
Commonwealth Games
Bronze medal – third place	1970 Edinburgh	4×100 m freestyle

Diana Margaret Sutherland (born 1 November 1954) is a British former swimmer. She competed in five events at the 1972 Summer Olympics.

== Biography ==
Sutherland grew up in Lincoln, England, attending St Joseph's Convent School, with her sister Sandra. Her parents moved to London in 1965. Her father was an insurance broker, Douglas Sutherland, from New Zealand.

She represented the England team at the 1970 British Commonwealth Games in Edinburgh, Scotland, where she participated in the 200 metres freestyle and the 4 x 100 metres medley relay, winning a bronze medal.

At the 1972 Olympic Games in Munich, she participated in 200 and 400 freestyle, the 100 and 200 backstroke and the freestyle relay.

Sutherland represented the Sutton and Cheam Swimming Club.
