= Michael Bailey (swimmer) =

British swimmer

Personal information
- Nationality: British (English)
- Born: 14 February 1948 (age 78) England
- Height: 186 cm (6 ft 1 in)
- Weight: 77 kg (170 lb)

Sport
- Sport: Swimming
- Event: Butterfly
- Club: Hull Olympic SC

Michael Bailey (born 14 February 1948) is a British former swimmer who competed at the 1972 Summer Olympics.

== Biography ==
Bailey represented the England team at the 1970 British Commonwealth Games in Edinburgh, Scotland, where he participated in the 100 metres butterfly event.

At the 1972 Olympic Games in Munich, Bailey participated in two events; the 200 metre freestyle and the 4 × 200 metre freestyle relay.
