= Alan Widdowson =

English swimmer

Personal information
- Nationality: British (English)
- Born: Q3. 1951 Nottingham, England

Sport
- Sport: Swimming
- Events: Butterfly; Freestyle
- Club: Nottingham Northern

Alan R. Widdowson (born 1951) is a retired swimmer who represented England at the Commonwealth Games.

== Biography ==
Widdowson swam for the Nottingham Northern Swimming Club and in 1967, he became the British junior record holder for the 220 yards freestyle. He made his England debut in 1967 and later represented Great Britain at international level.

Widdowson represented the England team at the 1970 British Commonwealth Games in Edinburgh, Scotland, where he participated in the 100 and 200 metres butterfly events.

In 1971, he was disqualified during the semi-final of the 200 metres butterfly at the British short course championships for an illegal turn but was selected as reserve for the British team for the 1971 tour to Canada and as part of the five member team for the tour to Germany.
