= Swimming at the 1971 Pan American Games – Women's 200 metre butterfly =

Women's 200 metre butterfly at the 1971 Pan American Games
- Venue: -
- Dates: August 10 (preliminaries and finals)
- Competitors: from - nations

Medalists
| Gold medal | Lynn Colella | United States |
| Silver medal | Alice Jones | United States |
| Bronze medal | Susan Smith | Canada |

The women's 200 metre butterfly competition of the swimming events at the 1971 Pan American Games took place on 10 August. The last Pan American Games champion was Claudia Kolb of US.

This race consisted of four lengths of the pool, all lengths being in butterfly stroke.

== Results ==
All times are in minutes and seconds.

| KEY: | q | Fastest non-qualifiers | Q | Qualified | GR | Games record | NR | National record | PB | Personal best | SB | Seasonal best |

=== Final ===
The final was held on August 10.

| Rank | Name | Nationality | Time | Notes |
|---|---|---|---|---|
| 1st place, gold medalist(s) | Lynn Colella | United States | 2:23.1 | |
| 2nd place, silver medalist(s) | Alice Jones | United States | 2:28.3 | |
| 3rd place, bronze medalist(s) | Susan Smith | Canada | 2:32.6 | |
| 4 | Jeanne Warren | Canada | 2:34.0 | |
| 5 | Norma Amezcua | Mexico | 2:36.0 | |
| 6 | Maria Hungerbuhler | Brazil | 2:36.3 | |
| 7 | Maria Mock | Puerto Rico | 2:36.7 | |
| 8 | Graciela Cadierno | Argentina | 2:40.4 | |
