= Bobby Stenhouse =

English bowls player

Personal information
- Nationality: British (English)
- Born: 16 December 1924 Tynemouth, England
- Died: 4 April 1990 (aged 65) Wellingborough, England

Sport
- Sport: Bowls
- Club: Wellingborough Town BC
Medal record
Representing England
World Outdoor Championships
Bronze medal – third place	1966 Kyeemagh	team

Robert Hastie Stenhouse (1924–1990) was an England international lawn and indoor bowls competitor.

== Bowls career ==
Stenhouse won the 1963 national fours title at the England Men's National Championships when bowling for Wellingborough Town BC.

He captained England at the 1966 World Outdoor Bowls Championship, where he won a bronze medal in the team event (Leonard Trophy).

He represented England in the rinks (fours), at the 1970 British Commonwealth Games in Edinburgh, Scotland, with Harold Powell, Norman Hook and Cliff Stroud.

During the 1972 World Outdoor Bowls Championship, he was the England team manager and was also an indoor international from 1968-1972.

== Personal life ==
He took up bowls with his father in 1947 and was married in 1953.
