= Sally Pickering =

English swimmer

Personal information
- Born: 1951 (age 74–75) Kingston upon Hull, England

Sport
- Sport: Swimming
- Event: Freestyle
- Club: Hull Olympic SC
Medal record
Women's swimming
Representing England
Commonwealth Games
Bronze medal – third place	1970 Edinburgh	4×100 m freestyle

Sally Ward Pickering (born 1951), married name Sally Windeatt is a female former swimmer who competed for England at the Commonwealth Games.

== Biography ==
Pickering swam for the Hull Olympic Swimming Club.

She represented the England team at the 1970 British Commonwealth Games in Edinburgh, Scotland, where she participated in the 100 metres freestyle and relay events, winning a bronze medal.

In 1976 she married fellow international swimmer Malcolm Windeatt.
