= Christine Jarvis =

British swimmer (born 1949)

Personal information
- Nationality: British (English)
- Born: 21 December 1949 (age 76)
- Height: 170 cm (5 ft 7 in)
- Weight: 69 kg (152 lb)

Sport
- Sport: Swimming
- Strokes: Breaststroke
- Club: Modernian SC, Bedford
- College team: University of Alabama
Medal record
Women's swimming
Representing England
Commonwealth Games
Bronze medal – third place	1970 Edinburgh	100 m breaststroke

Christine Anne Jarvis (born 21 December 1949) is a British former international swimmer who competed at the 1972 Summer Olympics and the 1976 Summer Olympics.

== Biography ==
Jarvis represented the England team at the 1970 British Commonwealth Games in Edinburgh, Scotland, where she participated in the 100 metres breaststroke event, winning a bronze medal.

Four years later she competed in the breaststroke events at the 1974 British Commonwealth Games in Christchurch, New Zealand.

At the ASA National British Championships she won the 100 metres breaststroke title in 1972 and 1973.
