= Jacqueline Brown =

English swimmer

Personal information
- Nationality: British (English)
- Born: 6 June 1953 (age 73) Kingston upon Hull, England

Sport
- Sport: Swimming
- Event: Backstroke
- Club: Hull Olympic SC

Jacqueline E. Brown (born 6 June 1953) is a British former swimmer who competed at the 1968 Summer Olympics and the 1972 Summer Olympics.

== Biography ==
Brown specialised in the backstroke and swam for the Hull Olympic Swimming Club.

Brown was a two times British champion; in 1971 when she won the 200 metres backstroke title (in Leeds) and in 1972 when she won the 100 metres backstroke title (in Crystal Palace) at the National Championships.

She represented the England team at the 1970 British Commonwealth Games in Edinburgh, Scotland, where she participated in the 100 metres backstroke event.

She competed at the 1968 Summer Olympics and the 1972 Summer Olympics.
