= Diane Lansley =

English swimmer

Personal information
- Nationality: British (English)
- Born: 1953 (age 72–73) Southampton, England
- Education: St Anne's Catholic School, Southampton

Sport
- Sport: Swimming
- Event: Butterfly
- Club: City of Southampton SC
- Partner: David White
- Coached by: Dave Haller
Medal record
Women's swimming
Representing England
Commonwealth Games
Gold medal – first place	1970 Edinburgh	100 m butterfly
Silver medal – second place	1970 Edinburgh	4×100 m medley

Diane E. Lansley (married name White - born 1953), is a female former swimmer who competed for England at the Commonwealth Games.

== Biography ==
Lansley represented the England team at the 1970 British Commonwealth Games in Edinburgh, Scotland, where she participated in the three swimming events, winning gold and silver medals.
