= Lorraine Burt =

English swimmer

Personal information
- Nationality: English
- Born: 1961 (age 63–64)

Sport
- Club: Reading Swimming Club

Lorraine Burt (born 1961) is an English former swimmer.

== Swimming career ==
Burt became National champion in 1983 when she won the 1983 ASA National Championship title in the 100 metres breaststroke.

She represented England in the 100 metres breaststroke event, at the 1986 Commonwealth Games in Edinburgh, Scotland. She swam for Reading Swimming Club.
