= Malcolm O'Connell =

British swimmer

Personal information
- Nationality: British (English)
- Born: 19 March 1955 Zimbabwe
- Died: 17 April 2008 (aged 53)
- Height: 178 cm (5 ft 10 in)
- Weight: 64 kg (141 lb)

Sport
- Sport: Swimming
- Event: Breaststroke
- Club: City of Southampton SC

Malcolm Gregory O'Connell (19 March 1955 – April 2008) was a male British international swimmer who competed at the 1972 Summer Olympics.

== Biography ==
O'Connell represented the England team at the 1970 British Commonwealth Games in Edinburgh, Scotland, where he participated in the 100 metres breaststroke and the 4 x 100 metres medley relay events.

At the ASA National British Championships he won the 100 metres breaststroke title in 1971 and 1972 and the 200 metres breaststroke title in 1971.

At the 1972 Olympic Games in Munich, he participated in the two events.
