= Amanda Radnage =

British swimmer

Personal information
- Nationality: British (English)
- Born: 27 September 1951 (age 74) York, England
- Height: 170 cm (5 ft 7 in)
- Weight: 59 kg (130 lb)

Sport
- Sport: Swimming
- Event: Breaststroke
- Club: York City Baths Club
Medal record
Women's swimming
Representing England
British Commonwealth Games
Bronze medal – third place	1970 Edinburgh	200 m breaststroke

Amanda Joy Radnage (born 27 September 1951) is a female retired British international swimmer who competed at the 1972 Summer Olympics..

== Biography ==
Radnage represented the England team at the 1970 British Commonwealth Games in Edinburgh, Scotland, where she participated in the 200 metres breaststroke event, winning a bronze medal.

At the ASA National British Championships she won the 110 yards breaststroke title in 1967 and 1970.

At the 1972 Olympic Games in Munich, Radnage participated in the women's 200 metre breaststroke.

Around 1974, she married Nils Purser, when 22; he was the Director of Education from 1992, of Newcastle-upon-Tyne.
