= British swimming champions – 100 metres breaststroke winners =

British swimming event

The British swimming champions over 100 metres breaststroke, formerly the (Amateur Swimming Association (ASA) National Championships) are listed below. The event was originally contested over 110 yards and then switched to the metric conversion of 100 metres in 1971.

Adrian Moorhouse equalled the world record of 1.01.49 sec in the 1990 men's final.

== 100 metres breaststroke champions ==
Year	Men's champion	Women's champion
	110 yards	110 yards
1964	Neil Nicholson	Jill Slattery
1965	Basil Hotz	Diana Harris
1966	Roger Roberts	Diana Harris
1967	Roger Roberts	Amanda Radnage
1968	Stuart Roberts	Diana Harris
1969	Mark Carty	Ann O'Connor
1970	Mark Carty	Amanda Radnage
	100 metres	100 metres
1971	Malcolm O'Connell	Dorothy Harrison
1972	Malcolm O'Connell	Christine Jarvis
1973	David Wilkie	Christine Jarvis
1974	David Wilkie	Sandra Dickie
1975	David Leigh	Helen Burnham
1976	Duncan Goodhew	Margaret Kelly
1977	Paul Naisby	Margaret Kelly
1978	Duncan Goodhew	Margaret Kelly
1979		
1980	Duncan Goodhew	Margaret Kelly
1981	Adrian Moorhouse	Suki Brownsdon
1982	Adrian Moorhouse	Joanne Seymour
1983	Adrian Moorhouse	Lorraine Burt
1984	Nigel Ali	Sandra Bowman
1985	Adrian Moorhouse	Sandra Bowman
1986	Adrian Moorhouse	Suki Brownsdon
1987	Adrian Moorhouse	Suki Brownsdon
1988	James Parrack	Suki Brownsdon
1989	Adrian Moorhouse	Suki Brownsdon
1990	Adrian Moorhouse	Lara Hooiveld
1991	Adrian Moorhouse	Lorraine Coombes
1992	Nick Gillingham	Lyndsey Rodgers
1993	Nick Gillingham	Jaime King
1994	James Parrack	Marie Hardiman
1995	James Parrack	Karen Rake
1996	Andy Cooper	Jo Hocking
1997	Richard Maden	Linda Hindmarsh
1998	Darren Mew	Jaime King
1999	Adam Whitehead	Linda Hindmarsh
2000	Darren Mew	Heidi Earp
2001	Darren Mew	Jaime King
2002	James Gibson	Kirsty Balfour
2003	James Gibson	Jaime King
2004	Darren Mew	Kirsty Balfour
2005	Darren Mew	Kirsty Balfour
2006	Darren Mew	Kirsty Balfour
2007	Christopher Jones	Kerry Buchan
2008	Chris Cook	Kate Haywood
2009	James Gibson	Kate Haywood
2010	Kristopher Gilchrist	Achieng Ajulu-Bushell
2011	Michael Jamieson	Stacey Tadd
2012	Daniel Sliwinski	Kate Haywood
2013	Ross Murdoch	Sophie Allen
2014	Ross Murdoch	Sophie Taylor
2015	Adam Peaty	Sophie Taylor
2016	Adam Peaty	Siobhan-Marie O'Connor
2017	Adam Peaty	Sarah Vasey
2018	Adam Peaty	Jessica Vall
2019	Adam Peaty	Jocelyn Ulyett
Not held during 2020 and 2021 due to the COVID-19 pandemic
2022	Adam Peaty	Kara Hanlon
2023	James Wilby	Kara Hanlon
2024	Adam Peaty	Angharad Evans
2025	Greg Butler	Angharad Evans
2026	Adam Peaty	Angharad Evans

== See also ==
- Aquatics GB
- List of British Swimming champions
