= Wendy Burrell =

British swimmer

Personal information
- Nationality: British (English)
- Born: 16 May 1952 (age 74) Carlisle, Cumberland, England
- Height: 165 cm (5 ft 5 in)
- Weight: 54 kg (119 lb)

Sport
- Sport: Swimming
- Event(s): Backstroke, medley
- Club: Carlisle SC

Wendy Burrell (born 16 May 1952) is a retired British international swimmer who competed at the 1968 Summer Olympics.

== Biography ==
Burrell swam for the Carlisle Swimming Club. At the 1968 Olympic Games in Mexico City, she participated in three events; the 100 metres and 200 metres backstroke and the medley relay, where she competed with Margaret Auton, Dorothy Harrison and Alexandra Jackson, finishing sixth.

Burrell represented the England team at the 1970 British Commonwealth Games in Edinburgh, Scotland, where she participated in the three swimming events.

At the ASA National British Championships she won the 110 yards backstroke title in 1968 and the 200 metres backstroke title twice (1968, 1970).
