= Malcolm Windeatt =

British swimmer

Personal information
- Nationality: British (English)
- Born: 5 April 1952 (age 74) Torquay, Devon, England
- Height: 185 cm (6 ft 1 in)
- Weight: 77 kg (170 lb)

Sport
- Sport: Swimming
- Strokes: Freestyle
- Club: Torquay Leander; Harpurhey
Medal record
Men's swimming
Representing England
British Commonwealth Games
Bronze medal – third place	1970 Edinburgh	4×100 m freestyle

Malcolm Barrie Windeatt (born 5 April 1952) is a former British international swimmer who represented Great Britain at the 1972 Summer Olympics.

== Swimming career ==
Born in Torquay, Windeatt moved to Manchester in his late teens due to a lack of suitable training facilities in his home town, choosing to study at the University of Manchester.

Windeatt represented England at the 1970 British Commonwealth Games in Edinburgh, Scotland, winning a bronze medal in the 4×100 m freestyle relay, and finishing eighth in the individual 100 m freestyle.

Windeatt represented Great Britain at the 1972 Olympic Games in Munich, swimming the individual 100 m freestyle, where he did not progress beyond the heats, and forming part of the 4×100 m medley relay team who finished seventh.

Windeatt is a four times winner of the British Championship in 100 metres freestyle (1969, 1970, 1971, 1972).

In 1976 he married fellow international swimmer Sally Pickering.

== See also ==
- List of Commonwealth Games medallists in swimming (men)
