= George Smith (swimmer) =

Canadian swimmer

Personal information
- Full name: George Warren Smith
- National team: Canada
- Born: November 20, 1949 (age 76) Edmonton, Alberta
- Height: 1.73 m (5 ft 8 in)
- Weight: 68 kg (150 lb)

Sport
- Sport: Swimming
- Strokes: Freestyle, individual medley
- College team: University of British Columbia
Medal record
Men's swimming
Representing Canada
Commonwealth Games
Gold medal – first place	1970 Edinburgh	200 m medley
Gold medal – first place	1970 Edinburgh	400 m medley
Silver medal – second place	1970 Edinburgh	4×100 m freestyle
Silver medal – second place	1970 Edinburgh	4×200 m freestyle

George Warren Smith (born November 20, 1949) is a former competition swimmer who represented Canada at the 1968 Summer Olympics in Mexico City. Smith placed fifth in the event final of the 200-metre individual medley, fourth in the 4x200-metre freestyle relay, and seventh in the 4x100-metre freestyle relay. He also competed in the preliminary heats of the 200-metre freestyle and 400-metre individual medley, but did not advance.

At the 1970 British Commonwealth Games in Edinburgh, Smith won two gold medals in the 200-metre and 400-metre individual medley events. He also won two silver medals in the 4x100-metre and 4x200-metre freestyle relay events, sharing second-place honours with Canadian teammates Ralph Hutton, Robert Kasting and Ron Jacks in both relays. His brother Graham and sister Becky also competed in swimming.

Inducted to the Alberta Sports Hall of Fame and Museum in 1976.

== See also ==
- List of Commonwealth Games medallists in swimming (men)
