= Diana Rickard (swimmer) =

Australian swimmer

Personal information
- Full name: Diana Jeanette Rickard
- National team: Australia
- Born: 5 October 1953 (age 72) Sydney
- Height: 1.62 m (5 ft 4 in)
- Weight: 53 kg (117 lb)

Sport
- Sport: Swimming
- Strokes: Backstroke, medley
Medal record
Women's swimming
Representing Australia
British Commonwealth Games
Bronze medal – third place	1970 Edinburgh	200 m medley

Diana Jeanette Rickard (born 5 October 1953), also known by her married name Diana van Hamburg, is an Australian former competition swimmer. She competed at the 1968 Summer Olympics in the 100-metre backstroke and 200-metre and 400-metre individual medley events, but failed to reach the finals.

She married the Dutch Olympic swimmer Roger van Hamburg. Since about 2000 they run a swimming school near Sydney, Australia. Their daughter Sasha is married to Adam Pine, also an Olympic swimmer.

== See also ==
- List of Commonwealth Games medallists in swimming (women)
