= Alexandra Jackson =

British swimmer (born 1952)

Personal information
- Full name: Alexandra Elizabeth Jackson
- National team: Great Britain; Isle of Man
- Born: 10 June 1952 (age 74) Dublin, Ireland
- Height: 1.75 m (5 ft 9 in)
- Weight: 69 kg (152 lb; 10.9 st)

Sport
- Sport: Swimming
- Strokes: Freestyle
Medal record
Women's swimming
Representing Great Britain
European Championships
Bronze medal – third place	1970 Barcelona	100 m freestyle
Representing the Isle of Man
British Commonwealth Games
Bronze medal – third place	1970 Edinburgh	200 m freestyle

Alexandra Elizabeth Jackson (born 10 June 1952) is a Manx former competitive swimmer.

== Swimming career ==
She won a bronze medal in the women's 100-metre freestyle at the 1970 European Aquatics Championships. She competed for Great Britain at the 1968 Summer Olympics in Mexico City, in the 100- and 200-metre freestyle, and the 4×100-metre freestyle and 4×100-metre medley relay events; her best achievement were sixth places in the 100-metre freestyle and 4×100-metre medley relay. In the medley relay she competed with Margaret Auton, Wendy Burrell and Dorothy Harrison.

She is a four times winner of the British Championship in 100 metres freestyle (1967-1970) and the 200 metres freestyle in 1968.
