= England at the 1970 British Commonwealth Games =

- CG code: ENG
- CGA: Commonwealth Games England

in Edinburgh, Scotland
- Flag bearer: David Hemery
- Medals Ranked 2nd: Gold 27 Silver 25 Bronze 32 Total 84

British Commonwealth Games appearances
- 1930; 1934; 1938; 1950; 1954; 1958; 1962; 1966; 1970; 1974; 1978; 1982; 1986; 1990; 1994; 1998; 2002; 2006; 2010; 2014; 2018; 2022; 2026; 2030

England competed at the 1970 British Commonwealth Games in Edinburgh, Scotland, from 16 to 25 July 1970.

England finished second in the medal table behind Australia with 27 gold medals, 25 silver medals and 32 bronze medals.

== Medal table (top three) ==
Rank	Nation	Gold	Silver	Bronze	Total
1	Australia	36	24	22	82
2	England	27	25	32	84
3	Canada	18	24	24	66
Totals (3 entries)		81	73	78	232

The athletes that competed are listed below.

== Team ==
=== Athletics ===
Men

Name	Event	Club	Medal
Bill Adcocks	marathon	Coventry Godiva Harriers	
Ralph Banthorpe	200m	Wolverhampton & Bilston AC	
Mike Baxter	5,000m	Leeds City AC	
Martin Bilham	400m, relay	Border AC	Bronze medal
John Caine	10,000m	Gateshead Harriers	
Colin Campbell	800m	Polytechnic Harriers	
Mike Campbell	high jump	Hillingdon AC	
Geoff Capes	shot put	Birchfield Harriers	
Steve Chappell	pole vault	Thames Valley Harriers	
Tony Collins	400m hurdles	Herne Hill Harriers	
Mike Cushion	discus throw	Woodford Green AC	
John Davies	800m	Sale Harriers	
Dave Dear	200m, 4x100m relay	Southampton & Eastleigh AAC	Bronze medal
Bob Dobson	20 mile walk	Basildon AC	
Don Faircloth	marathon	Croydon Harriers	Bronze medal
John FitzSimons	javelin	Polytechnic Harriers	Bronze medal
Brendan Foster	1,500m	Gateshead Harriers	Bronze medal
Bruce Fraser	hammer	North Shields Polytechnic	Silver medal
Peter Gabbett	decathlon	Royal Navy AC	Silver medal
Brian Green	100m, 4x100 relay	Pilkington Harriers, St. Helens	Bronze medal
Ian Green	100m, 4x100 relay	Luton United AC	Bronze medal
Leon Hall	high jump	Polytechnic Harriers	
Graham Hamlyn	triple jump	Blackheath Harriers	
John Harrison	100m	Warrington AC	
Mike Hauck	400m, relay	Thames Valley Harriers	Bronze medal
David Hemery	110m hurdles	Hillingdon AC	Gold medal
Martin Higdon	pole vault	Hercules Wimbledon AC	
Geoff Hignett	long jump	Pembroke / Stretford AC	
Ron Hill	marathon	Bolton United Harriers	Gold medal
Andy Holden	3,000m steeplechase	Preston AC	
Barry King	decathlon	Hillingdon AC	Bronze medal
John Kirkbride	1500m	Blackpool & Fylde AC	
Alan Lerwill	long jump, triple jump	Queen's Park AC	Bronze medal
Martin Winbolt-Lewis	800m	Achilles Club	
Shaun Lightman	20 mile walk	Metropolitan WC	
Martyn Lucking	shot put	Southend AC	
Roger Matthews	10,000m	Bournemouth AC	
Arthur McKenzie	discus throw	North Shields Polytechnic	
John McSorley	javelin throw	St. Mary's College	Silver medal
Alan Pascoe	110m hurdles	Polytechnic Harriers	
Howard Payne	hammer throw	Birchfield Harriers	Gold medal
Chris Perry	3,000m steeplechase	Birchfield Harriers	
Martin Reynolds	200m, relay	Thames Valley Harriers	Bronze medal
Allan Rushmer	5,000m	Tipton Harriers	
David Scharer	400m	Brighton & Hove AC	
John Sherwood	400m hurdles, 400 relay	Birchfield Harriers	,
Jim Smith	decathlon	Luton United AC	
Gerald Stevens	3,000m steeplechase	Reading AC	
Stuart Storey	110m hurdles	Birchfield Harriers	
Bill Tancred	discus throw	Loughborough Colleges	Bronze medal
Phil Taylor	high jump	Liverpool Univ	
Dick Taylor	5,000m, 10,000m	Coventry Godiva Harriers	Bronze medal
Jeff Teale	shot put	Doncaster Plant Works AC	Silver medal
Dave Travis	javelin throw	Surrey AC	Gold medal
Tony Wadhams	triple jump	Blackheath Harriers	
Len Walters	4x400m relay	Thames Valley Harriers	Bronze medal
Ron Wallwork	20 mile walk	Lancashire Walking Club	
John Whetton	1500m	Sutton-in-Ashfield Harriers	
Barry Williams	hammer throw	Liverpool Harriers	Bronze medal
Malcolm Yardley	400m	Blackburn AC	

Women

Name	Event	Club	Medal
Barbara-Anne Barrett	long jump	Mitcham AC	
Brenda Bedford	shot put, discus throw	Mitcham AC	
Christine Bell	100m hurdles	Stretford AC	Bronze medal
Avril Bowring	400m	Kent AC	
Norine Braithwaite	800, 1500m	Lancashire & Morecambe AC	
Sheila Carey	800m	Coventry Godiva Harriers	
Jannette Champion	400m	Stretford AC	
Shirley Clelland	pentathlon	Dartford College Of PE	
Madeleine Cobb	4 x 100 relay	Selsonia Ladies AC	Silver medal
Barbara Corbett	100m hurdles	Epsom & Ewell Harriers	
Margaret Critchley	200m, 4 x 100 relay	Bristol & West AC	,
Anne Farquhar	javelin throw	Selsonia Ladies AC	Silver medal
Jean Fielding	discus throw	Liverpool Harriers	
Barbara James	discus throw	Mitcham AC	
Della James	100m, 200m	London Olympiades	
Angela King	javelin throw	Small Heath Harriers	
Pat Lowe	800m	Birchfield Harriers	Silver medal
Anita Neil	100m, 4 x 100 relay	London Olympiades	Silver medal
Janet Oldall	High jump	Woking AC	
Joan Page	1,500m	Cambridge Harriers	Silver medal
Val Peat	100m, 4 x 100 relay	Dorothy Hyman TC	Silver medal
Rita Ridley	1500m	Essex Ladies	Gold medal
Sue Scott	100m hurdles, pentathlon	Birchfield Harriers	
Sheila Sherwood	long jump	Sheffield United Harriers	Gold medal
Dorothy Shirley	High jump	Spartan LAC	
Maureen Tranter	200m, 400m	Wolverhampton & Bilston AC	
Ann Wilson	pentathlon, long jump, high jump	Southend AC	,,

=== Badminton ===
Men

Name	Event	County	Medal
David Eddy	singles, doubles, mixed	Staffordshire	Bronze medal
Roger Mills	mixed	Surrey	Silver medal
Ray Sharp	singles, doubles	Kent	Bronze medal
Derek Talbot	singles, doubles, mixed	Northumberland	Gold medal
Paul Whetnall	singles, doubles, mixed	Kent	Silver medal

Women

Name	Event	County	Medal
Margaret Beck	singles	Middlesex	Gold medal
Margaret Boxall	singles, doubles, mixed	Kent	,,
Gillian Perrin	singles, doubles, mixed	Surrey	,,
Julie Rickard	doubles, mixed	Surrey	Silver medal
Sue Whetnall	singles, doubles, mixed	Kent	,

=== Boxing ===
Men only

Name	Event	Club	Medal
Michael Abrams	48 kg light-flyweight	Battersea ABC	Bronze medal
Johnny Banham	81 kg light-heavyweight	Metropolitan Police BC	
John Conteh	75 kg middleweight	Kirkby ABC, Liverpool	Gold medal
Howard Hayes	60 kg lightweight	Plant Works Doncaster	
Dave Needham	51 kg flyweight	Nottingham BC	Gold medal
Tony Oxley	54 kg bantamweight	Royal Navy BC	
Alan Richardson	57 kg featherweight	White Rose ABC, Wakefield	Bronze medal
Dave Simmonds	71 kg light-middlweight	Cinderford & Gloucester ABC	
Les Stevens	91 kg heavyweight	Reading ABC	Bronze medal
Ron Thurston	63.5 kg light-welterweight	Raven BC, Warrington	
Terry Waller	67 kg welterweight	Lynn ABC, London	

=== Cycling ===
Men only

Name	Event	Club	Medal
Michael Bennett	1 km time trial	Solihull CC	
Bob Bicknell	match sprint	Coventry RC	
Tony Brockhurst	tandem	Leicester Forest CC	
Ernie Crutchlow	match sprint	Coventry CC	
Gary Crewe	road race	Western RC	
Ian Hallam	scratch race, individual pursuit	Beeston RC	Gold medal
Ronald Keeble	scratch race, 1 km time trial	34th Nomads CC	
Willi Moore	individual pursuit	Merseyside Wheelers	
Pete Mugglestone	tandem	Leicester Forest CC	
Dave Rollinson	road race	Liverpool Mercury RC	
Dave Rowe	match sprint	34th Nomads CC	
Brian Rushton	road race	Humber Velo	
Ray Ward	1 km time trial, individual pursuit	Oldbury & District CC	

=== Diving ===
Men

Name	Event	Club	Medal
John Baker	3m springboard	Lewisham SC	
Philip Drew	10m platform	Highgate DC	Silver medal
Andrew Gill	10m platform	Metropolitan Diving School	Bronze medal
Joseph Thewlis	3m springboard	Luton Kingfishers	
Brian Wetheridge	3m springboard	Metropolitan Diving School	

Women

Name	Event	Club	Medal
Shelagh Burrow	10m platform	Hillingdon Diving School	Bronze medal
Alison Drake	3m springboard	Basildon	

=== Fencing ===
Men

Name	Event/s	Medal/s
David Acfield	sabre individual, team	Gold medal
Mike Breckin	foil individual, team	,
Richard Cohen	sabre individual, team	,
Rodney Craig	sabre individual, team	,
Bill Hoskyns	épée individual, team	,
Peter Jacobs	épée individual, team	,
Ralph Johnson	épée individual, team	Gold medal
Barry Paul	foil individual, team	,
Graham Paul	foil individual, team	,

Women

Name	Event/s	Medal/s
Sue Green	foil individual, team	Gold medal
Clare Henley	foil individual, team	Gold medal
Janet Wardell-Yerburgh	foil individual, team	,

=== Lawn bowls ===
Men only

Name	Event	Club	Medal
David Bryant	singles	Clevedon BC	Gold medal
Norman Hook	rinks/fours	Victory Park BC	
Norman King	pairs	Mansfield BC	Gold medal
Peter Line	pairs	Banister Park BC	Gold medal
Harold Powell	rinks/fours	Farnborough British Legion BC	
Bobby Stenhouse	rinks/fours	Wellingborough Town BC	
Cliff Stroud	rinks/fours	Trowbridge Westbourne BC	

=== Swimming ===
Men

Name	Event	Club	Medal
Michael Bailey	100m butterfly	Hull Olympic SC	
Tony Davidson	100m backstroke	Newcastle Under Lyme SC	
Tony Jarvis	100 & 200m freestyle, relays	Otter SC	,
John Mills	200 & 1500m freestyle,200m butterfly, relay	St James' SC, Stoke Newington	Bronze medal
Ivan Myall	100, 200 & 400m freestyle, relays	City of Southampton SC	,
Lennie Norris	100m butterfly, relay	Barracuda SC, Wimbledon	
Malcolm O'Connell	100m breaststroke, relay	City of Southampton SC	
William Price	100 & 200m breaststroke	Hornchurch ASC	
Jimmy Rogers	100 & 200m backstroke, relay	St James' SC, Stoke Newington	
Clive Rushton	100 & 200m backstroke	Rochdale SC	
Raymond Terrell	200m backstroke, 200 & 400m individual medley, relays	City of Southampton SC	,,,
Alan Widdowson	100 & 200m butterfly	Nottingham Northern	
Malcolm Windeatt	100m freestyle, relay	Torquay Leander	Bronze medal

Women

Name	Event	Club	Medal
Lesley Allardice	200m freestyle, relay	Hornchurch SC	Bronze medal
Sharon Anslow	200 & 400m individual medley	Southwark SC	
Jackie Brown	100m backstroke	Hull Olympic SC	
Wendy Burrell	100 & 200m backstroke, 400m individual medley	Carlisle SC	
Sheena Grant	200m backstroke	Wythenshawe SC, Manchester	
Diana Harris	100 & 200m breaststroke	Beckenham Ladies SC	
Dorothy Harrison	100 & 200m breaststroke, relay	Hartlepool SC	,,
Christine Jarvis	100m breaststroke	Modernian SC, Bedford	Bronze medal
Diane Lansley	100 & 200m butterfly, relay	City of Southampton SC	,
Sally Pickering	100m freestyle, relay	Hull Olympic SC	Bronze medal
Sylvia Platt	100 & 200m backstroke, relay	Hyde Seal SC	Silver medal
Amanda Radnage	200m breaststroke	York City SC	Bronze medal
Shelagh Ratcliffe	100m freestyle, 200 & 400m individual medley	Everton SC, Liverpool	Silver medal Bronze medal
Kathryn Smith	100m freestyle, relays	Coalville LC	Silver medal Bronze medal
Diana Sutherland	200m freestyle, relay	Cheam Ladies	Bronze medal
Jane Thomson	200m individual medley	Wolverhampton SC	
Gillian Treers	100 & 200m butterfly	Beckenham Ladies SC	
Susan Williams	200m butterfly, 400 & 800m freestyle	Exeter SC	

=== Weightlifting ===
Men only

Name	Event/s	Medal/s
Dave Hancock	110 kg heavyweight	Silver medal
Laurie Levine	75 kg middleweight	
Louis Martin	90 kg middle-heavyweight	Gold medal
Precious McKenzie	56 kg bantamweight	Gold medal
George Newton	67.5 kg lightweight	Gold medal
Mike Pearman	82.5 kg light-heavyweight	
Gerald Perrin	60 kg featherweight	Gold medal
Brian Saunders	+110 kg super-heavyweight	

=== Wrestling ===
Men only

Name	Event/s	Medal/s
Peter Amey	74 kg welterweight	
Kenneth Dawes	62 kg featherweight	
Terence Robinson	57 kg bantamweight	Bronze medal
David Idle	68 kg lightweight	
Ronald Grinstead	82 kg middleweight	Bronze medal
Richard Barraclough	90 kg light-heavyweight	
Denis McNamara	100 kg heavyweight	Bronze medal
