= Karen Moe =

American swimmer (born 1953)

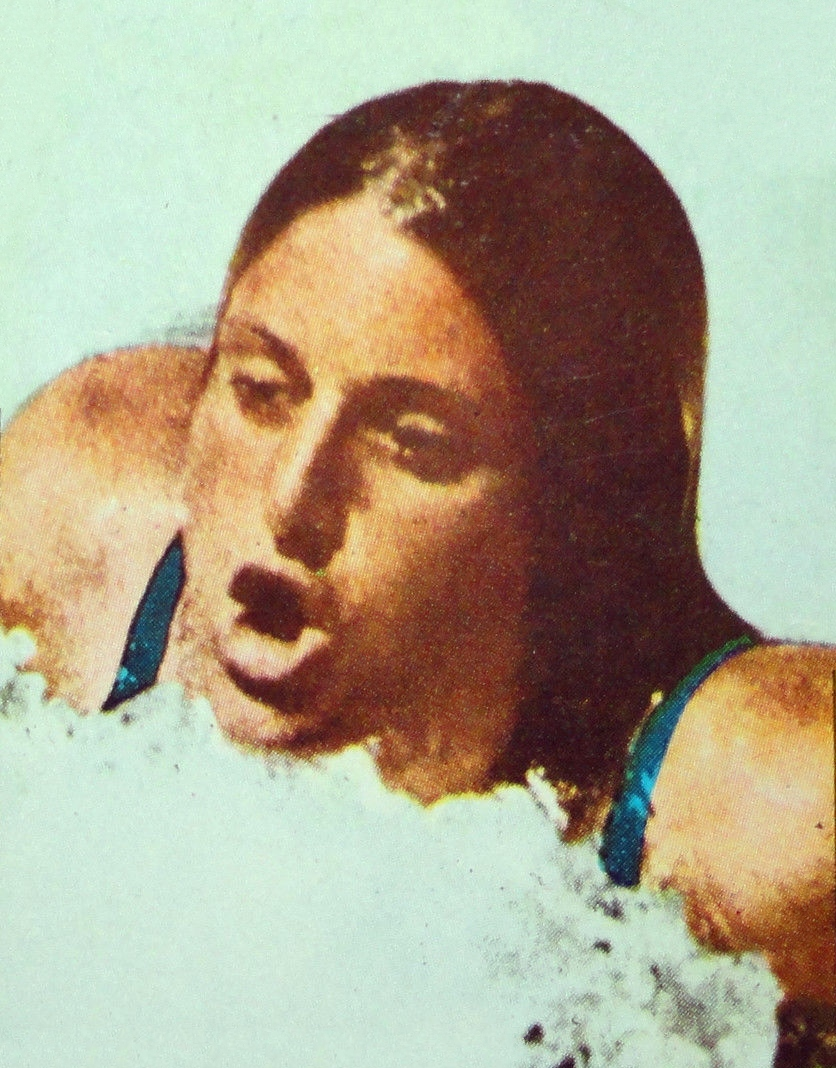

Personal information
- Full name: Karen Patricia Moe
- National team: United States
- Born: January 22, 1953 (age 73) Del Monte, Philippines
- Height: 5 ft 7 in (1.70 m)
- Weight: 123 lb (56 kg)

Sport
- Sport: Swimming
- Strokes: Butterfly
- College team: University of California, Los Angeles
Medal record
Representing the United States
Olympic Games
| Gold medal – first place | Munich 1972 | 200 m butterfly |

Karen Patricia Moe Humphreys (née Moe; born January 22, 1953) is an American former competition swimmer. She won the gold medal in the women's 200-meter butterfly event at the 1972 Summer Olympics. She set world records in the 200-meter butterfly in 1970, 1971 and 1972 (twice).

In 1978, Moe became the head coach of the California Golden Bears women's swim team at the University of California, Berkeley, and served in that position until 1992. At Cal, she coached 1984 Olympic triple gold butterfly medalist Mary T. Meagher, who also medalled in the 1988 Olympics. In 1987, she was named the NCAA Division I Women's Swimming Coach of the Year. From 1992 to 2004, she served within Cal's athletic department.

She was inducted into the International Swimming Hall of Fame as an "Honor Swimmer" in 1992.

== See also ==
- List of members of the International Swimming Hall of Fame
- List of Olympic medalists in swimming (women)
- List of University of California, Los Angeles people
- World record progression 200 metres butterfly

Records
| Preceded by Ada Kok; Alice Jones; Ellie Daniel | Women's 200-meter butterfly world record-holder July 11, 1970 – August 22, 1970; August 7, 1971 – August 28, 1971; August 6, 1972 – September 8, 1973 | Succeeded by Alice Jones; Ellie Daniel; Rosemarie Kother |
