= Moira Brown (swimmer) =

British swimmer

Personal information
- Born: 20 November 1952 (age 73)

Sport
- Sport: Swimming

Moira Brown (born 20 November 1952) is a British former swimmer. She competed in the women's 200 metre butterfly at the 1972 Summer Olympics.
