= Susan Smith (swimmer) =

Canadian swimmer

Personal information
- Born: 7 December 1950 (age 75) Edmonton, Alberta, Canada

Sport
- Sport: Swimming
Medal record
Women's swimming
Representing Canada
British Commonwealth Games
Silver medal – second place	1970 Edinburgh	100 m butterfly
Silver medal – second place	1970 Edinburgh	4×100 m freestyle
Bronze medal – third place	1970 Edinburgh	4×100 m medley
Pan American Games
Bronze medal – third place	1971 Cali	200 m butterfly

Susan Smith (born 7 December 1950) is a Canadian former swimmer. She competed in the women's 100 metre butterfly at the 1972 Summer Olympics.
