= Shaun Lightman =

British racewalker

Personal information
- Nationality: British (English)
- Born: 15 April 1943 (age 83) Brentford, England
- Height: 170 cm (5 ft 7 in)
- Weight: 67 kg (148 lb)

Sport
- Sport: Athletics
- Event: Racewalking
- Club: Metropolitan WC

Shaun Lightman (born 15 April 1943) is a retired British international racewalker who competed at the 1968 Summer Olympics.

== Biography ==
Lightman finished second behind Paul Nihill in the 7 miles walk event at the 1968 AAA Championships. Later that year at the 1968 Olympic Games in Mexico City, he represented Great Britain in the men's 50 kilometres walk.

He represented England in the 20 miles walk, at the 1970 British Commonwealth Games in Edinburgh, Scotland.

Lightman would podium twice more at the AAA Championships in 1973 and 1974.
