= Nigel Johnson (swimmer) =

British swimmer

Personal information
- Full name: Nigel Robert Johnson
- Born: 14 July 1953 (age 73)
- Height: 174 cm (5 ft 9 in)
- Weight: 60 kg (132 lb)

Sport
- Sport: Swimming
- Club: Millfield School
Medal record
Men's swimming
Representing Wales
British Commonwealth Games
Bronze medal – third place	1970 Edinburgh	4×100 m medley

Nigel Robert Johnson (born 14 July 1953) is a male British former swimmer. Johnson competed in the men's 200 metre breaststroke at the 1972 Summer Olympics. At the ASA National British Championships he won the 220 yards breaststroke title in 1970.
