= Raymond Terrell =

English swimmer

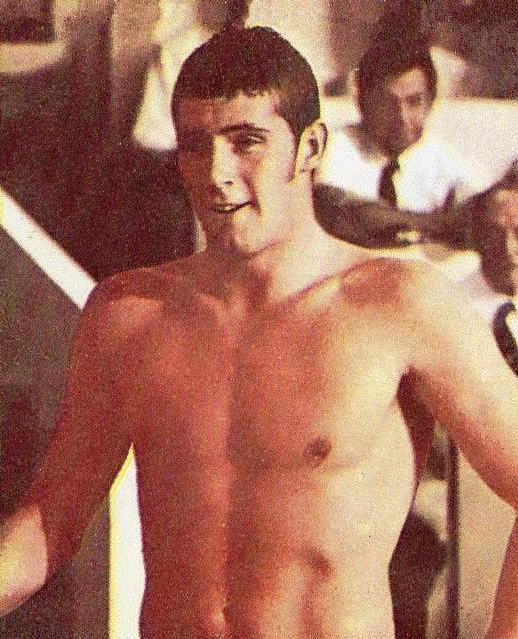
- Raymond Terrell c. 1972

Personal information
- Born: 5 May 1953 Southampton, England
- Died: January 2020 (aged 66)
- Height: 180 cm (5 ft 11 in)
- Weight: 76 kg (168 lb)

Sport
- Sport: Swimming
- Strokes: Freestyle, medley
- Club: City of Southampton Swimming Club
Medal record
Representing England
British Commonwealth Games
| Silver medal – second place | 1970 Edinburgh | 200 m backstroke |
| Silver medal – second place | 1970 Edinburgh | 400 m medley |
| Bronze medal – third place | 1970 Edinburgh | 4×100 m freestyle |
| Bronze medal – third place | 1970 Edinburgh | 4×200 m freestyle |
| Bronze medal – third place | 1974 Christchurch | 400 m medley |
| Bronze medal – third place | 1974 Christchurch | 4×100 m freestyle |
| Silver medal – second place | 1974 Christchurch | 4×200 m freestyle |

Raymond James Terrell (5 May 1953 – January 2020) was an English swimmer who won seven medals at the British Commonwealth Games.

== Swimming career ==
He competed at the 1968 Summer Olympics in the 200 m and 400 m individual medley and in the 4 × 200 m freestyle relay, but failed to reach the finals.

He represented England and won four medals, a double silver in the 200 metres backstroke and 400 metres medley and a double bronze in the freestyle relay events, at the 1970 British Commonwealth Games in Edinburgh, Scotland. Four years later he won a further three medals for the England team, at the 1974 British Commonwealth Games in Christchurch, New Zealand; a silver and bronze in the freestyle relay events and a bronze medal in the 400 metres medley.

At the ASA National British Championships he won the 1970 400 metres freestyle title, the 200 metres medley title in 1972 and the 400 metres medley title in 1972.

== Personal life ==
Ray was married to Trudi Terrell and lived in Old Bursledon, Hampshire.
