= Jane Thomson (actress) =

Australian stage actor and dancer

Jane Elizabeth "Eliza" Thomson (1827–1901), was an Australian stage actor and dancer.

== Early years ==
She was born 24 February 1829 to the actress Martha Mary Thomson (née Cooke) and her spouse, George Thomson, and arrived in Hobart in Tasmania with her parents in 1837. Her mother was a trained actress active in London, Hobart, Tasmania, (1837–38) and Sydney's Royal Victoria Theatre (1838–40). She was given ballet instruction from the dance master, Monsieur Charriere, in Sydney. She debuted in Sydney in 1842. Her sisters, Christina Mary and Elizabeth Marion Thomson also took turns on the stage.

== Career ==
Jane Thomson and her spouse performed at the theater of Anne Clarke in Hobart, Theatre Royal, Hobart 1844–46. She was highly praised as a dancer, but at this stage, she was regarded as a moderate actor. In 1845, the couple were engaged by George Coppin with a number of other members of Clarke's troupe and followed him to the Queen's Theatre, Melbourne, but returned to Clarke after only a couple of months. In 1846–47, she performed in the theater founded and managed by her spouse and mother. In 1849, her spouse became stage manager at the Royal Victoria Theatre, Hobart, and she became ballet mistress. From 1849 until 1857 she was engaged in Melbourne, where she became famous.

Between the late 1840s and through the 1850s, Jane Thomson was described as a star and admired for her skill as a dancer and her versatility as an actor, and according to the Hobart Courier on 21 March 1849, "the Victoria has not been so thronged for a considerable time." She gained recognition for her performance as Madeline in Edward Bulwer-Lytton's Eugene Aram, and was admired for her performance in the farce Continental Frolics, where she impressed when she "showed off" her "versatility of talent to advantage" by successfully playing five different characters. Her personal popularity and talent were confirmed by the fact that the critics gave her acknowledgments for her performance even when they regarded the play itself bad.

Between 1857 and 1862, she performed in London, initially under the stage name 'Eliza Young' and later as 'Eliza Vezin', enjoying great success as "one of the notable actresses on the London stage of the middle and late Victorian age." Her career soon eclipsed that of her spouse and she earned more money than him.

== Family ==
She married actor Charles Frederick Horace Frisby Young (1819–1874) in June 1845; she thereby became the sister-in-law of Emma Young, who was a very popular comedy actor and dancer in Australia between 1842 and 1857. She divorced her spouse in November 1862, for adultery and spousal abuse. Shortly after her return to England, Jane met and acted alongside the noted Shakespearian actor Hermann Vezin, whom she married three months after her divorce from Charles Young. a divorce, which attracted great attention in Australia, where she was still a celebrity at that point.
