= Graham White (swimmer) =

Australian swimmer

Personal information
- Full name: Graham Ross White
- National team: Australia
- Born: 14 February 1951 (age 75)
- Height: 1.83 m (6 ft 0 in)
- Weight: 79 kg (174 lb)

Sport
- Sport: Swimming
- Strokes: Freestyle
Medal record
Men's swimming
Representing Australia
Olympic Games
| Silver medal – second place | 1968 Mexico City | 4×200 m freestyle |
Commonwealth Games
| Gold medal – first place | 1970 Edinburgh | 400 m freestyle |
| Gold medal – first place | 1970 Edinburgh | 4×100 m freestyle |
| Gold medal – first place | 1970 Edinburgh | 4×200 m freestyle |

Graham Ross White, OAM (born 14 February 1951) is an Australian former middle-long-distance freestyle swimmer of the 1960s and 1970s, who won a silver medal in the 4x200-metre freestyle relay at the 1968 Summer Olympics in Mexico City.

White combined with Michael Wenden, Bob Windle and Greg Rogers to win silver in the 4×200-metre freestyle relay, half a body-length behind the Americans. He also competed in the 400-metre and 1500-metre freestyle, finishing fifth and fourth respectively.

At the 1970 Commonwealth Games in Edinburgh, White was a member of the four-man relay teams that claimed gold in both the 4×100-metre and 4×200-metre freestyle relays. Individually he claimed gold in the 400-metre event. Continuing to the 1972 Summer Olympics in Munich, White had a poor end to his career, placing fifth in the 1500-metre freestyle and being eliminated in the heats of the 200- and 400-metre freestyle events. White trained for the majority of his career at the Kew Swimming Club in Melbourne.

On 11 June 1984, White was awarded the Order of Australia Medal for services to sport.

== See also ==
- List of Commonwealth Games medallists in swimming (men)
- List of Olympic medalists in swimming (men)
- World record progression 4 × 200 metres freestyle relay

== Bibliography ==
Andrews, Malcolm (2000). Australia at the Olympic Games. Australian Broadcasting Corporation. p. 460. ISBN 0-7333-0884-8.
