= Debra Cain =

Australian swimmer (born 1956)

Personal information
- Full name: Deborah Margaret Cain
- Born: 16 July 1956 (age 69)

Sport
- Sport: Swimming
- Strokes: Backstroke, freestyle, individual medley
Medal record
Women's swimming
Representing Australia
Commonwealth Games
Gold medal – first place	1970 Edinburgh	4×100 m freestyle
Silver medal – second place	1970 Edinburgh	100 m backstroke
Silver medal – second place	1974 Christchurch	4×100 m freestyle
Silver medal – second place	1974 Christchurch	4×100 m medley
Bronze medal – third place	1970 Edinburgh	200 m backstroke

Debra Margaret Cain (born 16 July 1956) is an Australian former swimmer. She competed in four events at the 1972 Summer Olympics.
