= Jimmy Rogers (swimmer) =

British swimmer

Personal information
- Nationality: British (English)
- Born: c.1949 Southwark, London, England

Sport
- Sport: Swimming
- Event: Backstroke
- Club: St James' SC, Stoke Newington

James "Jimmy" W. Rogers (born c.1949) is a former international swimmer from England who competed at two Commonwealth Games.

== Biography ==
Rogers specialised in the backstroke and was a member of the St James' Swimming Club in Stoke Newington. He made his British international debut in April 1966.

Rogers represented the England team at the 1966 British Empire and Commonwealth Games in Kingston, Jamaica, where he reached the final of the 220 yards backstroke event.

Rogers continued to represent Great Britain into the early 1970s and represented England again at the 1970 British Commonwealth Games in Edinburgh, where he met fellow international swimmer Sylvia Platt. They became engaged on Christmas Day 1970 and married in 1971.
