= Helen Gray (swimmer) =

Australian swimmer (born 1956)

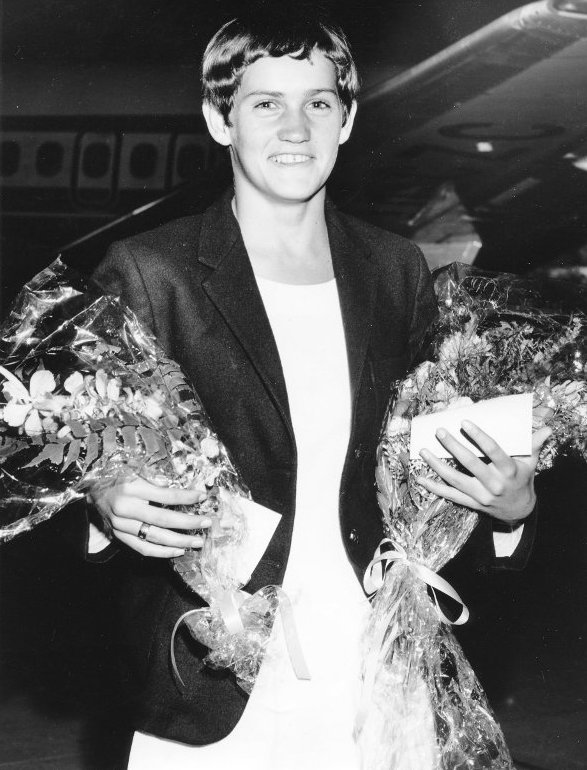
- Gray c. 1972

Personal information
- Born: 19 October 1956 (age 69)

Sport
- Sport: Swimming
Medal record
Women's swimming
Representing Australia
Commonwealth Games
Silver medal – second place	1970 Edinburgh	800 m freestyle

Helen Jewel Gray (born 19 October 1956) is an Australian former swimmer. She competed in the women's 200 metre freestyle at the 1972 Summer Olympics. She was from Townsville in Queensland.
