= Greg Rogers =

Australian swimmer

Personal information
- Full name: Gregory Francis Rogers
- National team: Australia
- Born: 14 August 1948 (age 78) Sydney, New South Wales
- Height: 1.89 m (6 ft 2 in)
- Weight: 87 kg (192 lb)

Sport
- Sport: Swimming
- Strokes: Freestyle
Medal record
Men's swimming
Representing Australia
Olympic Games
Silver medal – second place	1968 Mexico City	4×200 m freestyle
Bronze medal – third place	1968 Mexico City	4×100 m freestyle
Commonwealth Games
Gold medal – first place	1970 Edinburgh	4×100 m freestyle
Gold medal – first place	1970 Edinburgh	4×200 m freestyle
Silver medal – second place	1970 Edinburgh	100 m freestyle
Bronze medal – third place	1970 Edinburgh	200 m freestyle

Gregory Francis Rogers (born 14 August 1948) is an Australian former sprint freestyle swimmer of the 1960s and 1970s, who won a silver and bronze medal in the 4×200-metre and 4×100-metre freestyle relays, respectively, at the 1968 Summer Olympics in Mexico City. His brother Neil also competed as an Olympic swimmer.

Hailing from Sydney, Rogers was eliminated in the semifinals of the 100-metre freestyle, and the heats of the 400-metre freestyle event. He then combined with Michael Wenden, Bob Windle and Robert Cusack to win bronze in the 4×100-metre freestyle relay behind the teams from the United States and the Soviet Union. In the 4×200-metre freestyle relay, he combined with Wenden, Windle and Graham White to claim silver, half a bodylength behind the Americans.

At the 1970 Commonwealth Games in Edinburgh, Scotland, Rogers combined with his brother Neil to claim gold in both the 4×100-metre and 4×200-metre freestyle relays. Individually he claimed silver and bronze in the 100- and 200-metre freestyle events respectively. Continuing to the 1972 Summer Olympics in Munich, Germany, Rogers had an anticlimactic end to his career, being eliminated in the semifinals of the 100-metre freestyle.

He and his brother Neil both appeared nude in the 1974 August issue in the centre fold pages of Playgirl magazine.

Rogers' son Ryan played for Balmain Tigers lower grades and St George Illawarra Dragons.

== See also ==
- List of Commonwealth Games medallists in swimming (men)
- List of Olympic medalists in swimming (men)
- World record progression 4 × 200 metres freestyle relay
