= Paul Jarvie (swimmer) =

Australian swimmer

Personal information
- Born: 19 October 1952 (age 73)

Sport
- Sport: Swimming
- Strokes: Breaststroke
Medal record
Men's swimming
Representing Australia
Commonwealth Games
Silver medal – second place	1970 Edinburgh	200 m breaststroke
Silver medal – second place	1970 Edinburgh	4×100 m medley
Bronze medal – third place	1970 Edinburgh	100 m breaststroke

Paul Jarvie (born 19 October 1952) is an Australian former swimmer. He competed at the 1972 Summer Olympics and the 1976 Summer Olympics.
