= Bill Devenish =

Australian swimmer

Personal information
- Born: William Charles Devenish

Sport
- Country: Australia
- Sport: Swimming
- Event: Freestyle
Medal record
British Commonwealth Games
Gold medal – first place	1970 Edinburgh	4×100 m freestyle
Gold medal – first place	1970 Edinburgh	4×200 m freestyle
Bronze medal – third place	1970 Edinburgh	100 m freestyle

William Charles Devenish is a former competitive swimmer of the 1960s and 1970s.

A Sydney native, Devenish attended Westfields Sports High School and was a dominant swimmer in the Combined Schools competition, holding all possible freestyle records.

Devenish claimed three gold medals at the 1967 national titles in Adelaide and the following year came fourth in the 400 metres freestyle at the national titles, where a podium placing was needed for selection to the Mexico City Olympics.

In 1970, Devenish secured a bronze medal in the 100 metres freestyle at the 1970 British Commonwealth Games in Edinburgh and won two relay golds, including a world record breaking performance in the 4 x 200 metres freestyle.
