= James Findlay (swimmer) =

Australian swimmer

Personal information
- Full name: James Norman Findlay
- Born: 15 June 1954
- Died: 19 May 2015 (aged 60)

Sport
- Sport: Swimming
- Strokes: butterfly, medley
Medal record
Men's swimming
Representing Australia
Commonwealth Games
Silver medal – second place	1970 Edinburgh	4x100 medley relay
Bronze medal – third place	1970 Edinburgh	400m individual medley
Bronze medal – third place	1970 Edinburgh	200m butterfly

James Norman Findlay (15 June 1954 – 19 May 2015) was an Australian swimmer. He competed in two events at the 1972 Summer Olympics.
