= Denise Langford =

Australian swimmer

Personal information
- Full name: Denise June Langford
- National team: Australia
- Born: 31 December 1953 (age 72) Sydney
- Height: 1.62 m (5 ft 4 in)
- Weight: 49 kg (108 lb)

Sport
- Sport: Swimming
- Strokes: Freestyle, medley
Medal record
Women's swimming
Representing Australia
British Commonwealth Games
Gold medal – first place	1970 Edinburgh	200 m medley
Gold medal – first place	1970 Edinburgh	400 m medley
Gold medal – first place	1970 Edinburgh	4×100 m freestyle
Gold medal – first place	1970 Edinburgh	4×100 m medley
Silver medal – second place	1970 Edinburgh	400 m freestyle

Denise June Langford (born 31 December 1953) is an Australian former competitive swimmer. She swam in the 1968 Summer Olympics and 1970 British Commonwealth Games.

Langford is the mother of Australian netball player Kimberlee Green.

== See also ==
- List of Commonwealth Games medallists in swimming (women)
