= Marion Hoffman =

Australian sprinter (born 1949)

Personal information
- Nationality: Australian
- Born: 29 September 1949 (age 76)

Sport
- Sport: Sprinting
- Event: 100 metres
Medal record
Women's athletics
Representing Australia
Commonwealth Games
Gold medal – first place	1970 Edinburgh	4x100 m relay
Bronze medal – third place	1970 Edinburgh	100 m

Marion Hoffman (born 29 September 1949) is an Australian sprinter. She competed in the women's 100 metres at the 1972 Summer Olympics.
