= Swimming at the 1971 Pan American Games =

The Swimming competition at the 6th Pan American Games was held in Cali, Colombia during the Games' run in 1971. It consisted of 29 long course (50 m) events: 15 for males and 14 for females.

A world record was beaten in this edition of the Games, by the U.S. 4 × 200 m freestyle men's relay.

The victory of Canada in the women's 4 × 100 m medley marked the first time that the U.S. lost the gold in a relay event, at the Pan American Games.

In the 200 m butterfly, two swimmers won the first medals of their countries in swimming at Pan American Games at all times: Jorge Delgado got the gold for Ecuador, and Augusto González, the bronze for Peru.

== Results ==
=== Men's events ===
Event	Gold		Silver		Bronze	
100 m freestyle	Frank Heckl (United States) USA	52.80	José Aranha; Brazil	53.74	Robert Kasting; Canada	53.76
200 m freestyle	Frank Heckl (United States) USA	1:56.36	James McConica (United States) USA	1:58.18	Ralph Hutton; Canada	1:59.89
400 m freestyle	James McConica (United States) USA	4:08.97 GR	Steve Genter (United States) USA	4:13.05	Ralph Hutton; Canada	4:15.75
1500 m freestyle	Pat Miles (United States) USA	16:32.03 GR	Tom McBreen (United States) USA	16:32.99	Guillermo García; Mexico	16:45.56
100 m backstroke	Mel Nash (United States) USA	59.84	John Murphy (United States) USA	1:00.84	Bill Kennedy; Canada	1:01.35
200 m backstroke	Charlie Campbell (United States) USA	2:07.09 GR	Tim McKee (United States) USA	2:07.87	John Hawes; Canada	2:14.72
100 m breaststroke	Mark Chatfield (United States) USA	1:06.75 GR	Brian Job (United States) USA	1:07.93	José Fiolo; Brazil	1:07.94
200 m breaststroke	Rick Colella (United States) USA	2:27.12 GR	Felipe Muñoz (Mexico) MEX	2:27.22	Brian Job (United States) USA	2:28.11
100 m butterfly	Frank Heckl (United States) USA	56.92	Jerry Heidenreich (United States) USA	57.30	Byron MacDonald; Canada	58.40
200 m butterfly	Jorge Delgado; Ecuador	2:06.41 = GR, SA	C. Rob Orr (United States) USA	2:08.39	Augusto González; Peru	2:09.90
200 m I.M.	Steve Furniss (United States) USA	2:10.82	Frank Heckl (United States) USA	2:12.11	Felipe Muñoz; Mexico	2:16.28
400 m I.M.	Steve Furniss (United States) USA	4:42.69 GR	Ricardo Marmolejo; Mexico	4:49.04 NR	Rick Colella (United States) USA	4:49.30
4 × 100 m Free Relay	(United States) USA; David Edgar; Steve Genter; Jerry Heidenreich; Frank Heckl	3:32.15 GR	Canada; Timothy Bach; Ian MacKenzie; Brian Phillips; Robert Kasting	3:38.15	Brazil; Ruy de Oliveira; Flávio Machado; Paulo Zanetti; José Aranha	3:42.48 SA
4 × 200 m Free Relay	(United States) USA; Jerry Heidenreich; Jim McConica; Steve Genter; Frank Heckl	7:45.82; WR	Canada; Robert Kasting; Ron Jacks; Brian Phillips; Ralph Hutton	8:04.76	Brazil; Alfredo Machado; Ruy de Oliveira; José Aranha; Flávio Machado	8:08.42 SA
4 × 100 m Medley Relay	(United States) USA; John Murphy; Brian Job; Jerry Heidenreich; Frank Heckl	3:56.08 GR	Canada; John Hawes/Bill Kennedy(?); William Mahony; Byron MacDonald; Robert Kasting/Timothy Bach(?)	4:00.53	Brazil; César Lourenço; José Fiolo; Flávio Machado; José Aranha	4:02.94 SA

=== Women's events ===
Event	Gold		Silver		Bronze	
100 m freestyle	Sandy Neilson (United States) USA	1:00.60	Angela Coughlan; Canada	1:01.15	Karen James; Canada	1:01.88
200 m freestyle	Kim Peyton (United States) USA	2:09.62 GR	Angela Coughlan; Canada	2:10.56 NR	Olga de Angulo; Colombia	2:14.34 SA
400 m freestyle	Ann Simmons (United States) USA	4:26.19	Jill Strong (United States) USA	4:36.15	Angela Coughlan; Canada	4:38.86
800 m freestyle	Cathy Calhoun (United States) USA	9:15.19	Cynthia Enze (United States) USA	9:32.15	María Teresa Ramírez; Mexico	9:44.32
100 m backstroke	Donna Gurr; Canada	1:07.18 GR	Susie Atwood (United States) USA	1:07.51	Jill Hlay (United States) USA	1:08.49
200 m backstroke	Donna Gurr; Canada	2:24.73	Susie Atwood (United States) USA	2:26.48	Barbara Darby (United States) USA	2:30.73
100 m breaststroke	Sylvia Dockerill; Canada	1:18.63	Linda Kurtz (United States) USA	1:19.30	Lynn Colella (United States) USA	1:19.72
200 m breaststroke	Lynn Colella (United States) USA	2:50.03	Jane Wright; Canada	2:50.96 NR	Leonor Urueta; Mexico	2:52.72
100 m butterfly	Deena Deardurff (United States) USA	1:06.22	Leslie Cliff; Canada	1:07.77	Lucy Burle; Brazil	1:08.79 SA
200 m butterfly	Lynn Colella (United States) USA	2:23.11	Alice Jones (United States) USA	2:28.10	Susan Smith; Canada	2:32.60
200 m I.M.	Leslie Cliff; Canada	2:30.03	Susie Atwood (United States) USA	2:30.29	Cindy Plaisted (United States) USA	2:33.23
400 m I.M.	Leslie Cliff; Canada	5:13.31	Cindy Plaisted (United States) USA	5:13.64	Susie Atwood (United States) USA	5:13.75
colspan=7
4 × 100 m Freestyle Relay	(United States) USA; Sandy Neilson; Wendy Fordyce; Katheryn McKitrick; Lynn Skrifvars	4:04.20 GR	Canada; Leslie Cliff; Donna Gurr; Dianne Gate; Angela Coughlan	4:10.52	Brazil; Rosemary Ribeiro; Cristiane Paquelet; Maria Hungerbuler; Lucy Burle	4:15.24
4 × 100 m Medley Relay	Canada; Donna Gurr; Jane Wright; Leslie Cliff; Angela Coughlan	4:35.50	(United States) USA; Susan Atwood; Lynn Colella; Deena Deardurff; Sandra Neilson	4:36.73	Mexico; María Teresa Ramírez; Leonor Urueta; Norma Amezcua; Marcia Arriaga	4:45.18

== Medal table ==
Rank	Nation	Gold	Silver	Bronze	Total
1	United States	22	18	7	47
2	Canada	6	8	9	23
3	Ecuador	1	0	0	1
4	Mexico	0	2	5	7
5	Brazil	0	1	6	7
6	Colombia	0	0	1	1
6	Peru	0	0	1	1
Totals (7 entries)		29	29	29	87
