= Swimming at the 1972 Summer Olympics – Men's 4 × 100 metre freestyle relay =

Men's 4 × 100 metre freestyle relay at the Games of the XX Olympiad
- Venue: Olympia Schwimmhalle
- Date: 28 August 1972 (heats & final)
- Competitors: 63 from 14 nations
- Teams: 14
- Winning time: 3:26.42 WR

Medalists
1st place, gold medalist(s)		David Edgar, John Murphy, Jerry Heidenreich, Mark Spitz, Dave Fairbank*, Gary Conelly*	United States
2nd place, silver medalist(s)		Vladimir Bure, Viktor Mazanov, Viktor Aboimov, Igor Grivennikov, Georgi Kulikov*	Soviet Union
3rd place, bronze medalist(s)		Lutz Unger, Peter Bruch, Roland Matthes, Wilfried Hartung, Udo Poser*; *Indicates the swimmer only competed in the preliminary heats.	East Germany

The men's 4 × 100 metre freestyle relay event at the 1972 Olympic Games took place August 28. The relay featured teams of four swimmers each swimming two lengths of the 50 m pool freestyle.

== Results ==
=== Heats ===
Heat 1

Place	Swimmers	Time	Notes
1	Vladimir Bure, Viktor Mazanov, Viktor Aboimov, Georgijs Kuļikovs (URS)	3:32.72	
2	Gilles Vigne, Alain Mosconi, Alain Hermitte, Michel Rousseau (FRA)	3:35.84	
3	Gerhard Schiller, Rainer Jacob, Hans-Günther Vosseler, Kersten Meier (FRG)	3:37.59	
4	Jorge Comas, Antonio Culebras, Enrique Melo, José Pujol (ESP)	3:38.77	
5	Roberto Pangaro, Paolo Barelli, Marcello Guarducci, Alberto Castagnetti (ITA)	3:38.81	
6	Peter Prijdekker, Bert Bergsma, Roger van Hamburg, Hans Elzerman (NED)	3:41.36	
7	Jorge Urreta, José Joaquín Santibáñez, Guillermo García, Roberto Strauss (MEX)	3:43.46	

Heat 2

Place	Swimmers	Time	Notes
1	Jerry Heidenreich, Mark Spitz, David Fairbank, Gary Conelly (USA)	3:28.84	WR
2	Wilfried Hartung, Peter Bruch, Udo Poser, Lutz Unger (GDR)	3:35.13	
3	Bruce Robertson, Brian Phillips, Timothy Bach, Bob Kasting (CAN)	3:35.64	
4	Ruy de Oliveira, Paulo Zanetti, Paulo Becskehazy, José Roberto Aranha (BRA)	3:35.84	
5	Neil Rogers, Graham White, Bruce Featherston, Greg Rogers (AUS)	3:40.47	
6	Luis Ayesa, Dae Imlani, Carlos Singson, Jairulla Jaitulla (PHI)	3:47.39	
7	Salvador Vilanova, Reynaldo Patiño, Tomás Rengifo, Antonio Ferracuti (ESA)	3:49.14	

=== Final ===
Rank	Nation	Swimmers	Time	Notes
1st place, gold medalist(s)	United States	David Edgar (52.69); John Murphy (52.04); Jerry Heidenreich (50.78); Mark Spitz (50.90)	3:26.42	WR
2nd place, silver medalist(s)	Soviet Union	Vladimir Bure (52.26); Viktor Mazanov (53.13); Viktor Aboimov (52.75); Igor Grivennikov (51.57)	3:29.72	
3rd place, bronze medalist(s)	East Germany	Roland Matthes (52.89); Wilfried Hartung (53.31); Peter Bruch (53.20); Lutz Unger (53.01)	3:32.42	
4	Brazil	Ruy de Oliveira (53.62); Paulo Zanetti (53.61); Paulo Becskehazy (53.73); José Aranha (52.17)	3:33.14	
5	Canada	Bruce Robertson (53.52); Brian Phillips (52.56); Timothy Bach (54.41); Robert Kasting (52.70)	3:33.20	
6	West Germany	Klaus Steinbach (53.45); Werner Lampe (52.81); Rainer Jacob (53.81); Hans Fassnacht (53.82)	3:33.90	
7	France	Gilles Vigne (54.47); Alain Mosconi (54.57); Alain Hermitte (53.41); Michel Rousseau (51.66)	3:34.13	
8	Spain	Jorge Comas (54.32); Antonio Culebras (55.02); Enrique Melo (54.77); José Pujol (54.09)	3:38.21	
