= Swimming at the 1972 Summer Olympics – Men's 4 × 200 metre freestyle relay =

Men's 4 × 200 metre freestyle relay at the Games of the XX Olympiad
- Venue: Olympia Schwimmhalle
- Date: 31 August 1972 (heats & final)
- Competitors: 67 from 14 nations
- Teams: 14
- Winning time: 7:35.78 WR

Medalists
1st place, gold medalist(s)		John Kinsella, Fred Tyler, Steve Genter, Mark Spitz, Gary Conelly*, Tom McBreen*, Mike Burton*	United States
2nd place, silver medalist(s)		Klaus Steinbach, Werner Lampe, Hans-Günther Vosseler, Hans Faßnacht, Gerhard Schiller*, Folkert Meeuw*	West Germany
3rd place, bronze medalist(s)		Igor Grivennikov, Viktor Mazanov, Georgijs Kuļikovs, Vladimir Bure, Viktor Aboimov*, Aleksandr Samsonov*; *Indicates the swimmer only competed in the preliminary heats.	Soviet Union

The men's 4 × 200 metre freestyle relay event at the 1972 Olympic Games took place August 31. The relay featured teams of four swimmers each swimming four lengths of the 50 m pool freestyle.

== Results ==
=== Heats ===
Heat 1

Place	Swimmers	Time	Notes
1	Graham Windeatt, Bruce Featherston, Graham White, Mike Wenden (AUS)	7:49.03	OR
2	Ralph Hutton, Deane Buckboro, Ian MacKenzie, Brian Phillips (CAN)	7:57.69	
3	Brian Brinkley, John Mills, Michael Bailey, Colin Cunningham (GBR)	7:58.33	
4	Peter Prijdekker, Bert Bergsma, Roger van Hamburg, Hans Elzerman (NED)	8:00.87	
5	Guillermo García, Roberto Strauss, José Luis Prado, Jorge Urreta (MEX)	8:08.39	
6	Alfredo Carlos Machado, Ruy de Oliveira, Paulo Zanetti, José Roberto Aranha (BRA)	8:17.91	
7	Dae Imlani, Edwin Borja, Carlos Singson, Jairulla Jaitulla (PHI)	8:44.01	

Heat 2

Place	Swimmers	Time	Notes
1	Mark Spitz, Gary Conelly, Tom McBreen, Mike Burton (USA)	7:46.42	OR
2	Wilfried Hartung, Udo Poser, Roger Pyttel, Lutz Unger (GDR)	7:51.11	
3	Georgijs Kuļikovs, Vladimir Bure, Viktor Aboimov, Aleksandr Samsonov (URS)	7:51.44	
4	Hans Faßnacht, Gerhard Schiller, Folkert Meeuw, Hans-Günther Vosseler (FRG)	7:53.98	
5	Bengt Gingsjö, Hans Ljungberg, Anders Bellbring, Gunnar Larsson (SWE)	7:57.54	
6	Pierre Caland, Pierre-Yves Copin, Jean-Jacques Moine, Michel Rousseau (FRA)	8:00.79	
7	Roberto Pangaro, Arnaldo Cinquetti, Lorenzo Marugo, Riccardo Targetti (ITA)	8:03.98	

=== Final ===
Place	Swimmers	Time	Notes
1st place, gold medalist(s)	John Kinsella, Fred Tyler, Steve Genter, Mark Spitz (USA)	7:35.78	WR
2nd place, silver medalist(s)	Klaus Steinbach, Werner Lampe, Hans-Günther Vosseler, Hans Faßnacht (FRG)	7:41.69	
3rd place, bronze medalist(s)	Igor Grivennikov, Viktor Mazanov, Georgijs Kuļikovs, Vladimir Bure (URS)	7:45.76	
4	Bengt Gingsjö, Hans Ljungberg, Anders Bellbring, Gunnar Larsson (SWE)	7:47.37	
5	Mike Wenden, Graham Windeatt, Robert Nay, Brad Cooper (AUS)	7:48.66	
6	Wilfried Hartung, Peter Bruch, Udo Poser, Lutz Unger (GDR)	7:49.11	
7	Bruce Robertson, Brian Phillips, Ian MacKenzie, Ralph Hutton (CAN)	7:53.61	
8	Brian Brinkley, John Mills, Michael Bailey, Colin Cunningham (GBR)	7:55.59	
