= Swimming at the 1972 Summer Olympics – Men's 100 metre freestyle =

Men's 100 metre freestyle at the Games of the XX Olympiad
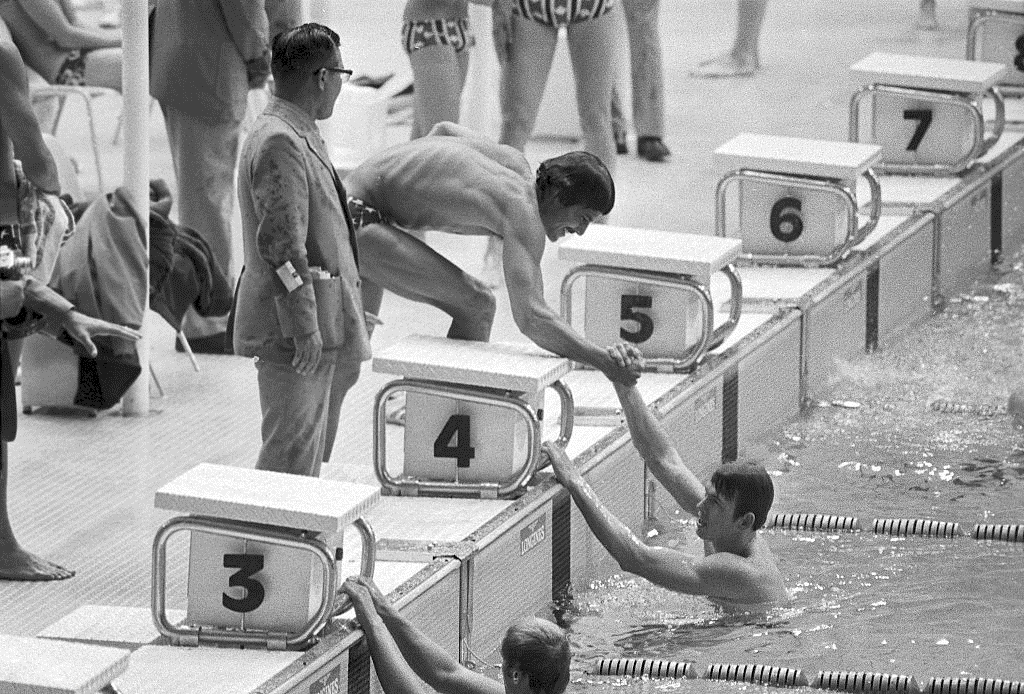
- Mark Spitz and Jerry Heidenreich (after the 400 metre freestyle)
- Venue: Olympia Schwimmhalle
- Dates: 2 September 1972 (heats & semifinals); 3 September 1972 (final)
- Competitors: 48 from 29 nations
- Winning time: 51.22 WR

Medalists
1st place, gold medalist(s)		Mark Spitz; United States
2nd place, silver medalist(s)		Jerry Heidenreich; United States
3rd place, bronze medalist(s)		Vladimir Bure; Soviet Union

The men's 100 metre freestyle event at the 1972 Olympic Games took place between September 2 and 3. There were 48 competitors from 29 nations. Nations had been limited to three swimmers each since the 1924 Games (except in 1960, when the limit was two). The event was won by Mark Spitz of the United States, his then-record sixth gold medal in a single Games (he would add a seventh in the medley relay, for a record that stood until Michael Phelps won eight in 2008). It was the ninth victory in the event for an American, most of any nation. Jerry Heidenreich, also of the United States, took silver. Soviet swimmer Vladimir Bure (father of future hockey hall of famer Pavel Bure) earned bronze, the nation's first medal in the men's 100 metre freestyle.

== Background ==
This was the 16th appearance of the men's 100 metre freestyle. The event has been held at every Summer Olympics except 1900 (when the shortest freestyle was the 200 metres), though the 1904 version was measured in yards rather than metres.

Three of the eight finalists from the 1968 Games returned: gold medalist Michael Wenden of Australia, bronze medalist Mark Spitz of the United States, and sixth-place finisher Georgijs Kuļikovs of the Soviet Union. Spitz had already won five gold medals in 1972, matching the record, and had two events left: the 100 metre freestyle and the medley relay. The American team was not expected to have any difficulty with the relay, so this event was the last one in which there was any substantial drama as to whether Spitz could take 7 gold medals in Munich. Spitz, who had set the world record at the U.S. trials, was favored, though fellow American Jerry Heidenreich was a serious contender, as were Wenden and the Soviet team.

Cambodia (then Khmer Republic), Kuwait, and New Zealand each made their debut in the event; East Germany competed separately for the first time. The United States made its 16th appearance, having competed at each edition of the event to date.

== Competition format ==
The competition used a three-round (heats, semifinals, final) format. The advancement rule mostly followed the format introduced in 1952, though the number of semifinals was reduced from 3 to 2 and qualification for the final was done via place with wild cards in the semifinals. Swim-offs were used as necessary to break ties.

A swimmer's place in the heat was not used to determine advancement; instead, the fastest times from across all heats in a round were used. There were 7 heats scheduled, with 7 or 8 swimmers each. Due to withdrawals, some heats had as few as 6 swimmers. The top 16 swimmers advanced to the semifinals.

There were 2 semifinals of 8 swimmers each. The top 3 swimmers in each semifinal as well as the next 2 fastest swimmers advanced to the final.

This swimming event used freestyle swimming, which means that the method of the stroke is not regulated (unlike backstroke, breaststroke, and butterfly events). Nearly all swimmers use the front crawl or a variant of that stroke. Because an Olympic size swimming pool is 50 metres long, this race consisted of two lengths of the pool.

For the first time at the Olympics, times were reported to the hundredths of a second.

== Records ==
These were the standing world and Olympic records (in seconds) prior to the 1972 Summer Olympics.

World record	Mark Spitz (USA)	51.47	Chicago, United States	5 August 1972
Olympic record	Michael Wenden (AUS)	52.2	Mexico City, Mexico	19 October 1968

Mark Spitz broke the world record in the final, swimming in 51.22 seconds. This also set a new record for most gold medals in a single Olympics, with six.

== Schedule ==
All times are Central European Time (UTC+1)

Date	Time	Round
Saturday, 2 September 1972	10:00; 18:00	Heats; Semifinals
Sunday, 3 September 1972	18:45	Final

== Results ==
=== Heats ===
The 16 fastest swimmers from seven heats advanced to the semifinals.

Rank	Heat	Swimmer	Nation	Time	Notes
1	7	Mike Wenden	Australia	52.34	Q
2	6	Jerry Heidenreich	United States	52.38	Q
3	7	Mark Spitz	United States	52.46	Q
4	3	Vladimir Bure	Soviet Union	52.87	Q
5	7	Klaus Steinbach	West Germany	52.91	Q
6	4	Michel Rousseau	France	52.93	Q
7	5	John Murphy	United States	53.07	Q
8	2	Igor Grivennikov	Soviet Union	53.64	Q
9	3	Jorge Comas	Spain	53.70	Q
10	6	Brian Phillips	Canada	53.75	Q
11	5	Georgijs Kuļikovs	Soviet Union	53.78	Q
12	4	Kersten Meier	West Germany	53.96	Q
13	4	Greg Rogers	Australia	53.98	Q
14	3	José Aranha	Brazil	54.06	Q
15	6	Bob Kasting	Canada	54.07	Q
16	5	Peter Bruch	East Germany	54.25	Q
17	1	Ruy de Oliveira	Brazil	54.26	
18	6	Gerhard Schiller	West Germany	54.28	
19	1	Gilles Vigne	France	54.34	
20	4	Hartmut Flöckner	East Germany	54.36	
21	1	Wilfried Hartung	East Germany	54.37	
22	2	Colin Herring	New Zealand	54.41	
22	7	Fritz Warncke	Norway	54.41	
24	2	Alain Hermitte	France	54.57	
25	1	Malcolm Windeatt	Great Britain	54.70	
26	2	István Szentirmay	Hungary	54.71	
27	7	Roberto Pangaro	Italy	54.74	
28	4	Bruce Robertson	Canada	54.76	
29	5	Paulo Zanetti	Brazil	54.97	
30	5	Brian Brinkley	Great Britain	55.06	
31	3	Hanspeter Würmli	Switzerland	55.08	
32	3	Neil Rogers	Australia	55.32	
33	7	Marian Slavic	Romania	55.35	
34	6	Attila Császári	Hungary	55.37	
35	6	Finnur Garðarsson	Iceland	55.97	
35	5	Zbigniew Pacelt	Poland	55.97	
37	5	Andrew Hunter	Ireland	56.09	
38	1	Geoffrey Ferreira	Trinidad and Tobago	56.27	
39	6	Salvador Vilanova	El Salvador	56.57	
40	2	Antonio Ferracuti	El Salvador	56.69	
41	1	Roberto Strauss	Mexico	56.78	
42	2	Sandro Rudan	Yugoslavia	56.91	
43	7	Jorge van Balen	Venezuela	57.20	
44	6	Wong Ronnie	Hong Kong	57.53	
45	3	Samnang Prak	Khmer Republic	59.18	
46	4	Feridun Aybars	Turkey	59.32	
47	2	Bruno Bassoul	Lebanon	1:00.08	
48	5	Abdullah Abdulrahman Zeyab	Kuwait	1:03.94	

=== Semifinals ===
The top three swimmers in each semifinal and the next two fastest overall advanced to the final.

==== Semifinal 1 ====
Rank	Swimmer	Nation	Time	Notes
1	Jerry Heidenreich	United States	52.31	Q
2	Igor Grivennikov	Soviet Union	52.55	Q
3	Vladimir Bure	Soviet Union	52.60	Q
4	Michel Rousseau	France	52.82	q
5	José Aranha	Brazil	53.47	
6	Brian Phillips	Canada	53.73	
7	Peter Bruch	East Germany	53.97	
8	Kersten Meier	West Germany	54.35	

==== Semifinal 2 ====
Rank	Swimmer	Nation	Time	Notes
1	Mike Wenden	Australia	52.32	Q
2	Mark Spitz	United States	52.43	Q
3	Klaus Steinbach	West Germany	52.87	Q
4	John Murphy	United States	53.17	q
5	Bob Kasting	Canada	53.62	
6	Georgijs Kuļikovs	Soviet Union	53.68	
7	Jorge Comas	Spain	53.92	
8	Greg Rogers	Australia	54.26	

=== Final ===
Spitz started fast, surprising Heidenreich. Heidenreich gave chase and closed during the final stretch, but was unable to catch Spitz.

Rank	Swimmer	Nation	Time	Notes
1st place, gold medalist(s)	Mark Spitz	United States	51.22	WR
2nd place, silver medalist(s)	Jerry Heidenreich	United States	51.65	
3rd place, bronze medalist(s)	Vladimir Bure	Soviet Union	51.77	
4	John Murphy	United States	52.08	
5	Mike Wenden	Australia	52.41	
6	Igor Grivennikov	Soviet Union	52.44	
7	Michel Rousseau	France	52.90	
8	Klaus Steinbach	West Germany	52.92	
