= Swimming at the 1971 Pan American Games – Men's 400 metre freestyle =

Men's 400 metre freestyle at the 1971 Pan American Games
- Venue: -
- Dates: August 8 (preliminaries and finals)
- Competitors: from - nations

Medalists
Gold medal	Jim McConica	United States
Silver medal	Steve Genter	United States
Bronze medal	Ralph Hutton	Canada

The men's 400 metre freestyle competition of the swimming events at the 1971 Pan American Games took place on 8 August. The last Pan American Games champion was Greg Charlton of US.

This race consisted of eight lengths of the pool, with all eight being in the freestyle stroke.

== Results ==
All times are in minutes and seconds.

KEY:	q	Fastest non-qualifiers	Q	Qualified	GR	Games record	NR	National record	PB	Personal best	SB	Seasonal best

=== Final ===
The final was held on August 8.

Rank	Name	Nationality	Time	Notes
1st place, gold medalist(s)	Jim McConica	United States	4:09.0	GR
2nd place, silver medalist(s)	Steve Genter	United States	4:13.1	
3rd place, bronze medalist(s)	Ralph Hutton	Canada	4:15.8	
4	Gustavo Sisson	Brazil	4:16.5	
5	Alfredo Machado	Brazil	4:17.8	
6	Guillermo Garcia	Mexico	4:18.7	
7	David Johnson	Canada	4:23.7	
8	Jorge Urrueta	Mexico	4:24.8	
