= Swimming at the 1971 Pan American Games – Men's 4 × 100 metre freestyle relay =

Men's 4 × 100 metre freestyle relay at the 1971 Pan American Games
- Venue: -
- Dates: August 7 (preliminaries and finals)
- Competitors: from - nations

Medalists
Gold medal	David Edgar, Steve Genter, Jerry Heidenreich and Frank Heckl	United States
Silver medal	Timothy Bach, Ian MacKenzie, Brian Phillips and Robert Kasting	Canada
Bronze medal	Ruy de Oliveira, Flávio Machado, Paulo Zanetti and José Aranha	Brazil

The men's 4 × 100 metre freestyle relay competition of the swimming events at the 1971 Pan American Games took place on 7 August. The defending Pan American Games champion is the United States.

This race consisted of eight lengths of the pool. Each of the four swimmers completed two lengths of the pool. The first swimmer had to touch the wall before the second could leave the starting block.

== Results ==
All times are in minutes and seconds.

KEY:	q	Fastest non-qualifiers	Q	Qualified	GR	Games record	NR	National record	PB	Personal best	SB	Seasonal best

=== Final ===
The final was held on August 7.

Rank	Name	Nationality	Time	Notes
1st place, gold medalist(s)	David Edgar; Steve Genter; Jerry Heidenreich; Frank Heckl	United States	3:32.2	GR
2nd place, silver medalist(s)	Timothy Bach; Ian MacKenzie; Brian Phillips; Robert Kasting	Canada	3:38.2	
3rd place, bronze medalist(s)	Ruy de Oliveira; Flávio Machado; Paulo Zanetti; José Aranha	Brazil	3:42.5	SA
4	Celestino Pérez; Michael Goodner; José Ferraioli; Gary Goodner	Puerto Rico	3:43.5	
5	Guillermo García; Escanero; Roberto Strauss; Jorge Urrueta	Mexico	3:43.7	
6	Jorge Delgado; Pinargoti; Orejuela; Gonzalez	Ecuador	3:44.6	
7	Arondo; C.Gonzalez; Tomás Becerra; R.Gonzalez	Colombia	3:44.9	
8	Bello; Monty; Pacheco; Olavide	Peru	3:54.2	
