= Swimming at the 1971 Pan American Games – Men's 4 × 100 metre medley relay =

Men's 4 × 100 metre medley relay at the 1971 Pan American Games
- Venue: -
- Dates: August 11 (preliminaries and finals)
- Competitors: from - nations

Medalists
Gold medal	John Murphy, Brian Job, Jerry Heidenreich and Frank Heckl	United States
Silver medal	John Hawes, William Mahony, Byron MacDonald and Robert Kasting	Canada
Bronze medal	César Lourenço, José Fiolo, Flávio Machado and José Aranha	Brazil

The men's 4 × 100 metre medley relay competition of the swimming events at the 1971 Pan American Games took place on 11 August. The defending Pan American Games champion is the United States.

== Results ==
All times are in minutes and seconds.

KEY:	q	Fastest non-qualifiers	Q	Qualified	GR	Games record	NR	National record	PB	Personal best	SB	Seasonal best

=== Final ===
The final was held on August 11.

Rank	Name	Nationality	Time	Notes
1st place, gold medalist(s)	John Murphy; Brian Job; Jerry Heidenreich; Frank Heckl	United States	3:56.1	GR
2nd place, silver medalist(s)	John Hawes; William Mahony; Byron MacDonald; Robert Kasting	Canada	4:00.5	
3rd place, bronze medalist(s)	César Lourenço; José Fiolo; Flávio Machado; José Aranha	Brazil	4:02.9	SA
4	- - - -	Mexico	4:04.0	
5	- - - -	Colombia	4:16.0	
6	- - - -	Argentina	4:19.2	
7	- - - -	Puerto Rico	4:19.3	
8	- - - -	Peru	4:19.6	
