= Swimming at the 1971 Pan American Games – Men's 1500 metre freestyle =

Men's 1500 metre freestyle at the 1971 Pan American Games
- Venue: -
- Dates: August 10 (preliminaries and finals)
- Competitors: from - nations

Medalists
Gold medal	Pat Miles	United States
Silver medal	Tom McBreen	United States
Bronze medal	Guillermo García	Mexico

The men's 1500 metre freestyle competition of the swimming events at the 1971 Pan American Games took place on 10 August. The last Pan American Games champion was Mike Burton of US.

This race consisted of thirty lengths of the pool, all lengths being in freestyle.

== Results ==
All times are in minutes and seconds.

KEY:	q	Fastest non-qualifiers	Q	Qualified	GR	Games record	NR	National record	PB	Personal best	SB	Seasonal best

=== Final ===
The final was held on August 10.

Rank	Name	Nationality	Time	Notes
1st place, gold medalist(s)	Pat Miles	United States	16:32.0	GR
2nd place, silver medalist(s)	Tom McBreen	United States	16:33.0	
3rd place, bronze medalist(s)	Guillermo García	Canada	16:45.6	
4	Jorge Delgado	Ecuador	16:53.1	
5	Gustavo Sisson	Brazil	17:06.8	
6	Ron Jacks	Canada	17:07.6	
7	Jorge Urrueta	Mexico	17:24.0	
8	Alfredo Machado	Brazil	17:25.1	
