= Swimming at the 1975 Pan American Games – Men's 200 metre freestyle =

Men's 200 metre freestyle at the 1975 Pan American Games
- Venue: -
- Dates: October 19 (preliminaries and finals)
- Competitors: from - nations

Medalists
| Gold medal | Jorge Delgado | Ecuador |
| Silver medal | Rick DeMont | United States |
| Bronze medal | Rex Favero | United States |

The men's 200 metre freestyle competition of the swimming events at the 1975 Pan American Games took place on 19 October. The last Pan American Games champion was Frank Heckl of US.

This race consisted of four lengths of the pool, all in freestyle.

== Results ==
All times are in minutes and seconds.

| KEY: | q | Fastest non-qualifiers | Q | Qualified | GR | Games record | NR | National record | PB | Personal best | SB | Seasonal best |

=== Final ===
The final was held on October 19.

| Rank | Name | Nationality | Time | Notes |
|---|---|---|---|---|
| 1st place, gold medalist(s) | Jorge Delgado | Ecuador | 1:55.45 | |
| 2nd place, silver medalist(s) | Rick DeMont | United States | 1:55.96 | |
| 3rd place, bronze medalist(s) | Rex Favero | United States | 1:57.08 | |
| 4 | Djan Madruga | Brazil | 1:57.17 | |
| 5 | - | - | - | |
| 6 | - | - | - | |
| 7 | - | - | - | |
| 8 | - | - | - | |
