= Swimming at the 1971 Pan American Games – Men's 4 × 200 metre freestyle relay =

Men's 4 × 200 metre freestyle relay at the 1971 Pan American Games
- Venue: -
- Dates: August 9 (preliminaries and finals)
- Competitors: from - nations

Medalists
Gold medal	Jerry Heidenreich, Jim McConica, Steve Genter, and Frank Heckl	United States
Silver medal	Jasting, Ron Jacks, Brian Phillips and Ralph Hutton	Canada
Bronze medal	Alfredo Machado, Ruy de Oliveira, José Aranha and Flávio Machado	Brazil

The men's 4 × 200 metre freestyle relay competition of the swimming events at the 1971 Pan American Games took place on 9 August. The defending Pan American Games champion is the United States.

This race consisted of sixteen lengths of the pool. Each of the four swimmers completed four lengths of the pool. The first swimmer had to touch the wall before the second could leave the starting block.

== Results ==
All times are in minutes and seconds.

KEY:	q	Fastest non-qualifiers	Q	Qualified	GR	Games record	NR	National record	PB	Personal best	SB	Seasonal best

=== Final ===
The final was held on August 9.

Rank	Name	Nationality	Time	Notes
1st place, gold medalist(s)	Jerry Heidenreich; Jim McConica; Steve Genter; Frank Heckl	United States	7:45.8	WR
2nd place, silver medalist(s)	Jasting; Ron Jacks; Brian Phillips; Ralph Hutton	Canada	8:04.8	
3rd place, bronze medalist(s)	Alfredo Machado; Ruy de Oliveira; José Aranha; Flávio Machado	Brazil	8:08.4	SA
4	Gonzalez; Syro; Tomás Becerra; Arango	Colombia	8:13.3	
5	Jorge Delgado; Pinargoti; Orejuela; Gonzalez	Ecuador	8:24.1	
6	John Daly; Cañales; Vivani; Santiago	Puerto Rico	8:45.3	
7	Lello; Pacheco; Gonzalez; Olavide	Peru	8:49.7	
