= Swimming at the 1971 Pan American Games – Men's 100 metre butterfly =

Men's 100 metre butterfly at the 1971 Pan American Games
- Venue: -
- Dates: August 10 (preliminaries and finals)
- Competitors: from - nations

Medalists
Gold medal	Frank Heckl	United States
Silver medal	Jerry Heidenreich	United States
Bronze medal	Byron MacDonald	Canada

The men's 100 metre butterfly competition of the swimming events at the 1971 Pan American Games took place on 10 August. The last Pan American Games champion was Mark Spitz of US.

This race consisted of two lengths of the pool, all in butterfly.

== Results ==
All times are in minutes and seconds.

KEY:	q	Fastest non-qualifiers	Q	Qualified	GR	Games record	NR	National record	PB	Personal best	SB	Seasonal best

=== Final ===
The final was held on August 10.

Rank	Name	Nationality	Time	Notes
1st place, gold medalist(s)	Frank Heckl	United States	56.9	
2nd place, silver medalist(s)	Jerry Heidenreich	United States	57.3	
3rd place, bronze medalist(s)	Byron MacDonald	Canada	58.4	
4	Hugo Valencia	Mexico	59.4	
5	Eduardo Orijuela	Ecuador	59.9	
6	Augusto Gonzalez	Peru	1:00.0	
7	Flávio Machado	Brazil	1:00.3	
8	Francisco Ramos	Brazil	1:00.4	
