= Swimming at the 1971 Pan American Games – Men's 200 metre individual medley =

Men's 200 metre individual medley at the 1971 Pan American Games
- Venue: -
- Dates: August 9 (preliminaries and finals)
- Competitors: from - nations

Medalists
Gold medal	Steve Furniss	United States
Silver medal	Frank Heckl	United States
Bronze medal	Felipe Muñoz	Mexico

The men's 200 metre individual medley competition of the swimming events at the 1971 Pan American Games took place on 9 August. The last Pan American Games champion was Doug Russell of US.

This race consisted of four lengths of the pool, one each in backstroke, breaststroke, butterfly and freestyle swimming.

== Results ==
All times are in minutes and seconds.

KEY:	q	Fastest non-qualifiers	Q	Qualified	GR	Games record	NR	National record	PB	Personal best	SB	Seasonal best

=== Final ===
The final was held on August 9.

Rank	Name	Nationality	Time	Notes
1st place, gold medalist(s)	Steve Furniss	United States	2:10.8	
2nd place, silver medalist(s)	Frank Heckl	United States	2:12.1	
3rd place, bronze medalist(s)	Felipe Muñoz	Mexico	2:16.3	
4	Ricardo Marmolejo	Mexico	2:17.4	
5	Eduardo Orejuela	Ecuador	2:18.1	
6	David Brumwell	Canada	2:20.1	
7	Carlos Azevedo	Brazil	2:21.4	
8	José Martia	Cuba	2:25.7	
