= Swimming at the 1971 Pan American Games – Men's 100 metre freestyle =

Men's 100 metre freestyle at the 1971 Pan American Games
- Venue: -
- Dates: August 11 (preliminaries and finals)
- Competitors: from - nations

Medalists
Gold medal	Frank Heckl	United States
Silver medal	José Aranha	Brazil
Bronze medal	Robert Kasting	Canada

The men's 100 metre freestyle competition of the swimming events at the 1971 Pan American Games took place on 11 August. The last Pan American Games champion was Don Havens of US.

This race consisted of two lengths of the pool, both lengths being in freestyle.

== Results ==
All times are in minutes and seconds.

KEY:	q	Fastest non-qualifiers	Q	Qualified	GR	Games record	NR	National record	PB	Personal best	SB	Seasonal best

=== Final ===
The final was held on August 11.

Rank	Name	Nationality	Time	Notes
1st place, gold medalist(s)	Frank Heckl	United States	52.8	
2nd place, silver medalist(s)	José Aranha	Brazil	53.7	
3rd place, bronze medalist(s)	Robert Kasting	Canada	53.8	
4	David Edgar	United States	53.8	
5	Gary Goodner	Puerto Rico	55.4	
6	Brian Phillips	Canada	55.5	
7	Ruy de Oliveira	Brazil	55.6	
8	Ricardo González	Colombia	56.2	
