= Swimming at the 1971 Pan American Games – Men's 400 metre individual medley =

Men's 400 metre individual medley at the 1971 Pan American Games
- Venue: -
- Dates: August 7 (preliminaries and finals)
- Competitors: from - nations

Medalists
| Gold medal | Steve Furniss | United States |
| Silver medal | Ricardo Marmolejo | Mexico |
| Bronze medal | Rick Colella | United States |

The men's 400 metre individual medley competition of the swimming events at the 1971 Pan American Games took place on 7 August. The last Pan American Games champion was William Utley of US.

This race consisted of eight lengths of the pool. The first two lengths were swum using the butterfly stroke, the second pair with the backstroke, the third pair of lengths in breaststroke, and the final two were freestyle.

== Results ==
All times are in minutes and seconds.

| KEY: | q | Fastest non-qualifiers | Q | Qualified | GR | Games record | NR | National record | PB | Personal best | SB | Seasonal best |

=== Final ===
The final was held on August 7.

| Rank | Name | Nationality | Time | Notes |
|---|---|---|---|---|
| 1st place, gold medalist(s) | Steve Furniss | United States | 4:42.7 | GR |
| 2nd place, silver medalist(s) | Ricardo Marmolejo | Mexico | 4:49.0 | NR |
| 3rd place, bronze medalist(s) | Rick Colella | United States | 4:49.3 | |
| 4 | Tomás Becerra | Colombia | 4:53.9 | |
| 5 | Alfredo Machado | Brazil | 4:54.7 | NR |
| 6 | José Luis Prado | Mexico | 4:59.8 | |
| 7 | Luís Syro | Colombia | 5:11.9 | |
