= Swimming at the 1971 Pan American Games – Men's 200 metre freestyle =

Men's 200 metre freestyle at the 1971 Pan American Games
- Venue: -
- Dates: August 6 (preliminaries and finals)
- Competitors: from - nations

Medalists
Gold medal	Frank Heckl	United States
Silver medal	Jim McConica	United States
Bronze medal	Ralph Hutton	Canada

The men's 200 metre freestyle competition of the swimming events at the 1971 Pan American Games took place on 6 August. The last Pan American Games champion was Don Schollander of US.

This race consisted of four lengths of the pool, all in freestyle.

== Results ==
All times are in minutes and seconds.

KEY:	q	Fastest non-qualifiers	Q	Qualified	GR	Games record	NR	National record	PB	Personal best	SB	Seasonal best

=== Final ===
The final was held on August 6.

Rank	Name	Nationality	Time	Notes
1st place, gold medalist(s)	Frank Heckl	United States	1:56.4	
2nd place, silver medalist(s)	Jim McConica	United States	1:58.2	
3rd place, bronze medalist(s)	Ralph Hutton	Canada	1:59.9	
4	Jorge Delgado	Ecuador	2:00.5	
5	Fernando González	Ecuador	2:02.6	
6	Tomás Becerra	Colombia	2:02.8	
7	Alfredo Machado	Brazil	2:03:0	
8	David Johnson	Canada	2:03.0	
