= Genter =

Genter is a surname of unknown origin. Notable people with the surname include:

- Frances A. Genter (1898–1992), American racehorse owner
- Julie Anne Genter (born 1979), New Zealand politician
- Steve Genter (born 1951), American swimmer
