= Jean-Jacques Moine =

French swimmer (1954–2022)

Personal information
- Born: 7 September 1954 France
- Died: 14 February 2022 (aged 67) France

Sport
- Sport: Swimming

Jean-Jacques Moine (7 September 1954 – 14 February 2022) was a French swimmer. He competed in the men's 4 × 200 metre freestyle relay at the 1972 Summer Olympics. Moine died on 14 February 2022, at the age of 67.
