= Jane Wright (swimmer) =

Canadian swimmer

Personal information
- Born: 23 March 1955 (age 71) Toronto, Ontario, Canada

Sport
- Sport: Swimming
Medal record
Representing Canada
Pan American Games
Gold medal – first place	1971 Cali	4x100m medley relay
Silver medal – second place	1971 Cali	200m breaststroke

Jane Wright (born 23 March 1955) is a Canadian former breaststroke swimmer. She competed in two events, 100 and 200 breaststroke at the 1972 Summer Olympics.
