= Leonor Urueta =

Mexican swimmer

Personal information
- Born: 22 March 1954 (age 72)

Sport
- Sport: Swimming
Medal record
Representing Mexico
Pan American Games
| Bronze medal – third place | 1971 Cali | 200m breaststroke |
| Bronze medal – third place | 1971 Cali | 4x100m medley relay |

Leonor Urueta (born 22 March 1954) is a Mexican former breaststroke swimmer. She competed in two events at the 1972 Summer Olympics. She finished third in the 1971 Pan American Games 200 metres breaststroke and third in the 1971 Pan American Games 4×100 metres medley.
