= Byron MacDonald =

American Canadian swimming coach (born 1950)

Personal information
- Full name: Arthur Byron MacDonald
- National team: Canada
- Born: July 23, 1950 (age 76) Evanston, Illinois
- Height: 1.75 m (5 ft 9 in)
- Weight: 74 kg (163 lb)

Sport
- Sport: Swimming
- Strokes: Butterfly
- College team: University of Michigan
Medal record
Men's swimming
Representing Canada
Pan American Games
Silver medal – second place	1971 Cali	4×100 m medley
Bronze medal – third place	1971 Cali	100 m butterfly
Commonwealth Games
Gold medal – first place	1970 Edinburgh	100 m butterfly
Gold medal – first place	1970 Edinburgh	4×100 m medley
Silver medal – second place	1974 Christchurch	100 m butterfly
Summer Universiade
Silver medal – second place	1973 Moscow	100 m butterfly

Arthur Byron MacDonald (born July 23, 1950) is an American Canadian swimming coach who helms the Toronto Varsity Blues swim teams at the University of Toronto. He is a former swimmer who competed for Canada in the 1972 Summer Olympics in Munich, Germany. MacDonald placed sixth in the final of the men's 100-metre butterfly, and also competed in the preliminary heats of the 200-metre butterfly, but did not advance. He is currently the head coach of the Toronto Titans for the International Swimming League, and is also the Toronto Swim Club's founder, board president and National Assistant Head Coach.

MacDonald coached Varsity Blues swim teams to 24 Canadian Interuniversity Sport USports National Championships — Fifteen women's, and nine men's —including most recently, a women's and men's team competition sweep of the 2015-2016 national titles. He has also coached the Varsity Blues teams to 60 Conference (OUA) titles — 32men and 28 women. Two of MacDonald's swimmers have won Olympic medals — most recently Kylie Masse at the 2016 Olympic Games in the 100metre backstroke.

== Career ==
=== Early life ===
MacDonald was born to Kenzie Angus MacDonald of Mississauga, Ontario, whose family had immigrated from the Isle of Skye in Scotland, and Mary Betts Pebbles of Ancaster, Ontario, whose family had immigrated from England and were successful millers in Ancaster. Byron was the oldest of five children.

He grew up in suburban Chicago, where he attended New Trier High School, the first American high school with an indoor pool. In view of overcrowding—there were more than 5,000 students—the school was expanded in his second year to a separate campus, New Trier West, which was a separate high school between 1965 and 1981. MacDonald was a member of its first graduating class, in 1968, and first All-American athlete.

MacDonald accepted a scholarship to attend the University of Michigan and was an All American in his three years of Varsity competition. He graduated with a Bachelors in Business Administration in 1972 and returned in the Fall of 1973 to do his master's degree in education, graduating in 1975. Before returning for his master's degree at Michigan, MacDonald began a Masters Diploma at the University of Toronto in the Winter of 1973 but did not finish it. He did swim for the University of Toronto team (Canadian universities permit five years of eligibility) and was named All Canadian and helped Toronto to the national title.

=== Swimming career ===
MacDonald won six international Games medals for Canada. In his first international, the Commonwealth Games in Edinburgh Scotland in 1970, he won the gold medal in the 100metre butterfly and the 4x100Medley Relay. The 100metre butterfly win was a historic first for Canada as he led the first ever international Games sweep of the medals in any sport—with countrymen Tom Arusoo and Ron Jacks winning the silver and bronze medals.

In 1971 he won bronze and silver in the same two events at the PanAm Games in Columbia. In 1973 he won a silver medal in the 100metre butterfly at the FISU Games in Moscow; and in 1974 a silver in the same event in the 1974 British Commonwealth Games in New Zealand. At the Olympic Games in 1972 in Munich Germany he finished 6th in the 100metre butterfly. And 7th at the 1975 World Aquatics Championships in Colombia.

=== Coaching career ===
MacDonald began his coaching career in the Fall of 1976 at York University, located in the suburbs of Toronto. He took the team from 28th (out of 30 teams) in the country to 3rd in his second year at the helm of the team and was named Coach of the Year. He moved to the University of Toronto in the Fall of 1978 to be the head coach of the Men's team. He would assume the head coaching duties of the Women's team as well in the Fall of 1983. His lifetime dual meet record is 495–47.

MacDonald's teams have won 24 national titles and 60 Conference titles—arguably the most decorated coach in Canadian university history in any sport. MacDonald has won dozens of “Coach-of-the-year” awards—from organizations like the OUA Conference, the National University body (now named USports), Swim Ontario and Swim Canada.

Two of MacDonald's swimmers have won Olympic bronze medals: Marcel Gery in 1992 Barcelona, 4x100 Medley Relay and Kylie Masse, 2016 in Rio in 100m backstroke.

MacDonald was an assistant coach on the 1992 Olympic Games Canadian coaching staff. He was the Canadian Head Coach for the 1989 Pan Pacific Competition and the 1993 FISU Games. Both were, at the time, the most successful Games results ever at those Games for Canada.

In 2020, MacDonald was named the head coach of the Toronto Titans, the first and only Canadian based team of the International Swim League (ISL) The Toronto Titans are an expansion team and will have their first season in 2020–2021.

== Broadcasting career ==
MacDonald has also acted as a commentator for swimming events; he was a two-time recipient of the Gemini Award for Best Sports Play-by-Play or Analyst in recognition of his swimming analysis on CBC at the 2004 and 2008 Summer Olympics.

During the 2016 Summer Olympics, MacDonald attracted criticism for remarks on a hot mic that a swimmer in the women's 4 × 200 metre freestyle relay (which was implied to be a member of the Chinese team) had "dropped the ball", and that she "went out like stink, [and] died like a pig." MacDonald and the CBC later apologized for the remark, stating that he meant it as a description of her performance, and did not mean for it to be a personal attack.

== Personal life ==
He married Lisha van Leeuwen in 1990 and they had three children together, Shane, another son and a daughter.

== See also ==
- List of University of Michigan alumni
