= Pierre-Yves Copin =

French swimmer

Personal information
- Full name: Pierre-Yves Copin
- Nationality: French
- Born: 25 April 1951 (age 75)

Sport
- Sport: Swimming

Pierre-Yves Copin (born 25 April 1951) is a French former swimmer. He competed in the men's 4 × 200 metre freestyle relay at the 1972 Summer Olympics.
