= Erika Rüegg =

Swiss swimmer

Personal information
- Nationality: Swiss
- Born: 20 March 1952
- Died: 27 January 2015 (aged 62)
- Spouse: Steve Genter
- Children: 5

Sport
- Sport: Swimming
- Strokes: Breaststroke
- Club: Schwimmverein Limmat, Zürich (SUI)

Erika Rüegg (20 March 1952 – 27 January 2015), known as Erika Genter after 1974, was a Swiss breaststroke swimmer, who competed in three events at the 1972 Munich Olympics.

== 1972 Munich Olympics ==
As noted, at the 1972 Munich Olympics, Erika competed in three events. In the 100 meter breaststroke, she placed 11th with a time of 1:17.50, in the 200-meter breaststroke, she placed 15th with a time of 2:47.63, and in the 4x100-meter Medley Relay, with Erika swimming the breaststroke leg, her team placed 11th with a combined time of 4:34.69.

=== Life after swimming ===
Rüegg was engaged to marry 1972 American Olympic gold medalist Steve Genter in Long Beach, California on September 14, 1974. After Genter graduated from UCLA, he and Ruegg moved to Switzerland, where they lived after the late 1970s. They raised a family of 5 children, and lived on a farm in Dussnang, Thurgau, where Erika embraced a rural lifestyle that included caring for water buffalo and managing a household in the Swiss Alps. She held three professions, with roles as a mother, farmer, and professional. Genter worked in the computer industry, and coached water polo, his favorite sport. Rüegg died on January 27, 2015.
