= Athletics at the 1971 Pan American Games – Men's triple jump =

Men's triple jump at the Pan American Games

The men's triple jump event at the 1971 Pan American Games was held in Cali on 5 August.

== Results ==
Rank	Name	Nationality	#1	#2	#3	#4	#5	#6	Result	Notes
1st place, gold medalist(s)	Pedro Pérez	Cuba	16.92	17.40	14.92	17.04	17.12	17.19	17.40	WR
2nd place, silver medalist(s)	Nelson Prudêncio	Brazil							16.82	
3rd place, bronze medalist(s)	John Craft	United States							16.32	
4	Juan Velásquez	Cuba							16.03	
5	Tim Barrett	Bahamas							15.75	
6	Manuel Gutiérrez	Colombia							15.03	
7	Luiz Carlos de Souza	Brazil							14.83	
8	Jaime Pautt	Colombia							14.27	
9	Clavia Squires	Barbados							13.37	
