= Vladimir Bure =

Russian swimmer (1950–2024)

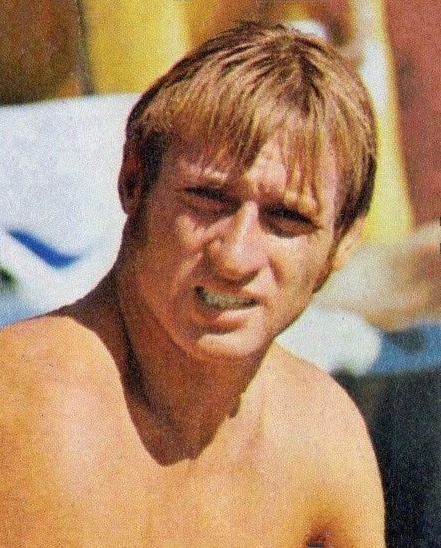
- Bure, c. 1974

Personal information
- Born: 4 December 1950 Norilsk, Krasnoyarsk Krai, Russian SFSR, USSR
- Died: 3 September 2024 (aged 73) Miami, Florida, U.S.
- Height: 181 cm (5 ft 11 in)
- Weight: 76 kg (168 lb)

Sport
- Sport: Swimming
- Event: Freestyle
- Club: Lokomotiv Moscow; Armed Forces Moscow

Achievements and titles
- Personal bests: 100 m – 51.32 (1975); 200 m – 1:56.15 (1972); 400 m – 4:06.3 (1973); 1500 m – 17:25.6 (1968)
Medal record
Representing the Soviet Union
Olympic Games
Bronze medal – third place	1968 Mexico City	4×200 m freestyle
Silver medal – second place	1972 Munich	4×100 m freestyle
Bronze medal – third place	1972 Munich	100 m freestyle
Bronze medal – third place	1972 Munich	4×200 m freestyle
World Championships (LC)
Silver medal – second place	1973 Belgrade	4×100 m freestyle
Silver medal – second place	1975 Cali	100 m freestyle
European Championships (LC)
Gold medal – first place	1970 Barcelona	4×100 m freestyle
Silver medal – second place	1970 Barcelona	4×200 m freestyle
Silver medal – second place	1974 Vienna	100 m freestyle
Silver medal – second place	1974 Vienna	4×100 m freestyle
Bronze medal – third place	1974 Vienna	4×100 m medley
Silver medal – second place	1977 Jönköping	100 m freestyle
Bronze medal – third place	1977 Jönköping	4×100 m freestyle
Summer Universiade
Gold medal – first place	1973 Moscow	100 m freestyle
Bronze medal – third place	1970 Turin	400 m freestyle

Vladimir Valeryevich Bure (Russian: Владимир Валерьевич Буре, 4 December 1950 – 3 September 2024) was a Russian and Soviet freestyle swimmer and a fitness coach for the New Jersey Devils of the NHL. Bure was the father of retired NHL players Pavel and Valeri Bure.

== USSR ==
Bure competed for the Soviet Union at the 1968, 1972, and 1976 Olympics and won four medals: one in the individual 100 m and three in the relay. Additionally, Bure was a two-time European champion as well as a 17-time Soviet champion. He also won two silver medals at the 1973 and 1975 World Championships.

Bure was swimming coach at the Armed Forces Society in from 1979 to 1985. After that he served as Vice President of Exsport club from 1985 to 1991, where he managed eight different sports.

Vladimir married Tatiana Bure and they had two sons born in Moscow: Pavel born on 31 March 1971 and Valeri born on 13 June 1974.

== North America ==
In 1991, Vladimir and his sons Pavel and Valeri moved to North America. They settled initially in Los Angeles where Vladimir continued to train and coach both Valeri and Pavel in hockey and physical conditioning until Pavel embarked on a National Hockey League (NHL) career with the Vancouver Canucks. However both sons became estranged from their father, along with his second wife Julia, and their half-sister Katya, by 1998. Neither brother has explained a reason for the split.

Vladimir joined Pavel, spending four seasons (1994 to 1998) as a fitness consultant with the Vancouver Canucks. In the summer of 1999 he joined the New Jersey Devils as fitness consultant. He won the Stanley Cup twice with New Jersey, in 2000 and 2003. His name was engraved on the Stanley Cup in 2003.

== Death ==
Bure died from complications of a heart attack on 3 September 2024, at the age of 73.
