= Hans Vosseler =

German swimmer

Personal information
- Born: February 5, 1949 (age 77) Paderborn, Nordrhein-Westfalen, West Germany

Sport
- Sport: Swimming
Medal record
Representing West Germany
Olympic Games
Silver medal – second place	1972 Munich	4x200m freestyle relay

Hans Vosseler (born 5 February 1949) is a German swimmer and Olympic medalist. He participated at the 1972 Summer Olympics winning a silver medal in 4 x 200 metre freestyle relay.
