= Swimming at the 1967 Pan American Games – Men's 400 metre freestyle =

Men's 400 metre freestyle at the 1967 Pan American Games
- Venue: Pan Am Pool
- Dates: July 29 (preliminaries and finals)
- Competitors: from - nations

Medalists
| Gold medal | Greg Charlton | United States |
| Silver medal | Ralph Hutton | Canada |
| Bronze medal | Mike Burton | United States |

The men's 400 metre freestyle competition of the swimming events at the 1967 Pan American Games took place on 29 July at the Pan Am Pool. The last Pan American Games champion was Roy Saari of US.

This race consisted of eight lengths of the pool, with all eight being in the freestyle stroke.

== Results ==
All times are in minutes and seconds.

| KEY: | q | Fastest non-qualifiers | Q | Qualified | GR | Games record | NR | National record | PB | Personal best | SB | Seasonal best |

=== Final ===
The final was held on July 29.

| Rank | Name | Nationality | Time | Notes |
|---|---|---|---|---|
| 1st place, gold medalist(s) | Greg Charlton | United States | 4:10.23 | |
| 2nd place, silver medalist(s) | Ralph Hutton | Canada | 4:11.88 | |
| 3rd place, bronze medalist(s) | Mike Burton | United States | 4:15.74 | |
| 4 | - | - | - | |
| 5 | - | - | - | |
| 6 | - | - | - | |
| 7 | - | - | - | |
| 8 | - | - | - | |
