= Bill Mahony =

Canadian swimmer (born 1949)

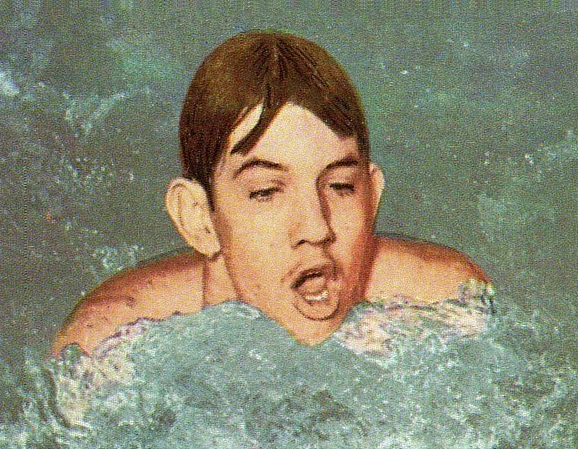
- Mahony c. 1972

Personal information
- Full name: William Victor Mahony
- National team: Canada
- Born: September 16, 1949 (age 76) New Westminster, British Columbia
- Height: 1.80 m (5 ft 11 in)
- Weight: 70 kg (154 lb)

Sport
- Sport: Swimming
- Strokes: Breaststroke
- Club: Pacific Dolphins
- College team: University of British Columbia; University of Michigan
Medal record
Representing Canada
Olympic Games
Bronze medal – third place	1972 Munich	4×100 m medley
Commonwealth Games
Gold medal – first place	1970 Edinburgh	100 m breaststroke
Gold medal – first place	1970 Edinburgh	200 m breaststroke
Gold medal – first place	1970 Edinburgh	4×100 m medley
Gold medal – first place	1974 Christchurch	4×100 m medley
Bronze medal – third place	1966 Kingston	220 yd breaststroke
Pan American Games
Silver medal – second place	1967 Winnipeg	4×100 m medley
Silver medal – second place	1971 Cali	4×100 m medley

William Victor Mahony (born September 16, 1949) is a former breaststroke swimmer who represented Canada in multiple international championships from 1966 to 1974, including two Summer Olympics, the Pan American Games, and two Commonwealth Games.

Mahony began his international career at the 1966 Commonwealth Games in Jamaica, with a bronze medal in the 220-yard breaststroke. In Mexico City for the 1968 Summer Olympics, he competed in the semifinals of the 100-metre breaststroke, the preliminary heats of the 200-metre breaststroke, and the finals of the men's 4×100-metre medley relay.

He attended the University of Michigan, where he swam for the Michigan Wolverines swimming and diving team in National Collegiate Athletic Association (NCAA) and Big Ten Conference competition from 1969 to 1971. He received All-American honours during each of his three varsity seasons as a college swimmer in the States. Despite being of Canadian nationality he won the ASA National British Championships 220 yards breaststroke title in 1969.

At the 1970 Commonwealth Games in Edinburgh, he won three gold medals in the 100-metre and 200-metre breaststroke, and the 4×100-metre medley relay. In Cali, Colombia for the 1971 Pan American Games, Mahony earned a silver medal as a member of Canada's 4×100-metre medley relay team. At the 1972 Summer Olympics in Munich, West Germany, he won a bronze medal in the men's 4×100-metre medley relay, together with Canadian teammates Erik Fish, Bruce Robertson and Robert Kasting.

After taking a year off, in his final international event at the 1974 Commonwealth Games in Auckland, New Zealand, he won another gold medal swimming his lifetime fastest Breastroke leg for the Canadian team in the 4×100-metre medley relay, alongside Brian Phillips, Bruce Robertson and Steve Pickell.

From 1977 to 1987 he developed the Adapted Aquatics program at Variety's Treatment Centre in Surrey, British Columbia, and helped to form the British Columbia Branch of the Cerebral Palsy Sports Association. Later, while coaching paraplegic and blind swimmers, he was selected to coach the Canadian swimmers at the 1980 Olympics for the Disabled in the Netherlands. He was awarded Athlete of the Year in New Westminster, and inducted into the BC Swimming Hall of Fame, Canadian Swimming Hall of Fame, and BC Sports Hall of Fame.

== See also ==
- List of Commonwealth Games medallists in swimming (men)
- List of Olympic medalists in swimming (men)
- List of University of Michigan alumni
