= John Hawes (pentathlete) =

Canadian sportsperson (born 1951)

Personal information
- Full name: John David Hawes
- National team: Canada
- Born: March 1, 1951 (age 75) Montreal, Quebec, Canada
- Height: 1.73 m (5 ft 8 in)
- Weight: 70 kg (150 lb)

Sport
- Sport: Swimming, modern pentathlon
- Event(s): Backstroke, pentathlon
- College team: McGill University
Medal record
Men's swimming
Representing Canada
Pan American Games
Bronze medal – third place	1971 Cali	200 m backstroke
Universiade
Bronze medal – third place	1973 Moscow	200 m backstroke

John David Hawes (born March 1, 1951) is a Canadian former competitive swimmer and modern pentathlete. Hawes won a bronze medal in his signature 200-metre backstroke event at the 1971 Pan American Games in Cali, Colombia, and again at the 1973 World University Games in Moscow. He competed in the preliminary heats of the men's 200-metre backstroke at the 1972 Summer Olympics in Munich, and the modern pentathlon team and individual events at the 1976 Summer Olympics in Montreal.
