= Jerry Heidenreich =

American swimmer (1950–2002)

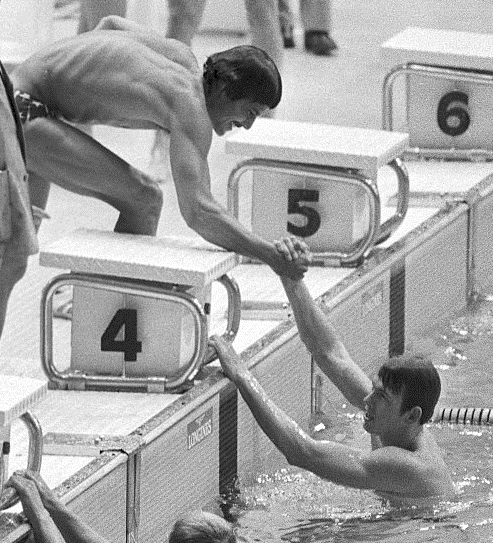
- Heidenreich (right) and Mark Spitz at the 1972 Olympics

Personal information
- Full name: Jerome Alan Heidenreich
- Nicknames: "Jerry", "The Poet"
- National team: United States
- Born: February 4, 1950 Tulsa, Oklahoma, U.S.
- Died: April 18, 2002 (aged 52) Paris, Texas, U.S.
- Height: 6 ft 0 in (183 cm)
- Weight: 161 lb (73 kg)

Sport
- Sport: Swimming
- Strokes: Butterfly, freestyle
- College team: Southern Methodist University
- Coach: Red Barr, George McMillion; SMU
Medal record
Men's swimming
Representing the United States
Olympic Games
Gold medal – first place	1972 Munich	4×100 m medley
Gold medal – first place	1972 Munich	4×100 m freestyle
Silver medal – second place	1972 Munich	100 m freestyle
Bronze medal – third place	1972 Munich	100 m butterfly
Pan American Games
Gold medal – first place	1971 Cali	4×100 m freestyle
Gold medal – first place	1971 Cali	4×200 m freestyle
Gold medal – first place	1971 Cali	4×100 m medley
Silver medal – second place	1971 Cali	100 m butterfly
Universiade
Silver medal – second place	1970 Turin	100 m butterfly

Jerome Alan Heidenreich (February 4, 1950 – April 18, 2002) was an American competition swimmer for Southern Methodist University, a 1972 Munich Olympic champion, and a former world record-holder. He set six world records during his swimming career, all as a relay team member.

== Early swimming ==
He swam for Hillcrest High School and Town North YMCA in Dallas. In his Senior year at Hillcrest, Heidenreich set State records in the 100-yard butterfly of 53.1 seconds, and in the 200-yard freestyle of 1:46.3 seconds at the Texas Interscholastic League State Swimming Championships in Lubbock on March 22–23, 1968. He was a National All America qualifier in seven events. In April 1968, he was formally presented the Mike Malone Memorial Trophy, intended as an annual award presented to Texas's most outstanding High School swimmer.

== Swimming for SMU ==
He attended Southern Methodist University where he swam for Hall of Fame Head Coach Red Barr and Assistant Coach George McMillion, with McMillion acting as Head Coach in 1971. Heidenreich broke nearly all of SMU's freestyle, butterfly, and individual medley records. He was an All American four times while at SMU, and won one NCAA title, eighteen individual Southwest Conference Titles, and set a new World Record in the 200 yard freestyle. During college, Heidenreich also swam occasionally in the summer seasons for the Dallas Swim Club, known also as the Dr. Pepper Swim Club of Dallas, which was coached by SMU Coach Redd Barr, and in 1971 by former SMU swimmer and newly hired SMU Assistant Coach Richard Quick. The team would later be known as the Dallas Mustangs Swim Club. He graduated from SMU in 1972 with a business degree.

== 1972 Olympic medalist ==
He competed at the 1972 Summer Olympics in Munich, Germany, where he received gold medals in the 4×100-meter freestyle relay, and 4×100-meter medley relay. The final time in the U.S. gold medal-winning 4x100 freestyle relay was a World Record 3:26.42, with Mark Spitz swimming the anchor leg, and the Soviet Union finishing second. It was the first relay event of the Olympics.

The final time in the U.S. gold medal-winning 4x100 medley relay was 3:48.16, a full four seconds ahead of the second place silver medal team East Germany. Heidenreich swam a fast anchor leg as the fourth swimmer, and Mark Spitz swam third for the butterfly leg. The relay was the final swimming event of the Olympics, and was met with considerable celebration as Spitz received his seventh gold medal as a result of the U.S. win.

In individual events, Heidenreich received a silver medal in 100-meter freestyle with a 51.22, only .43 seconds behind first place Mark Spitz, who Heidenreich was not quite able to catch at the finish. Heidenreich also won a bronze medal in the 100-meter butterfly, finishing with a 55.74, around 1.5 seconds behind American teammate Mark Spitz, who won the gold and dominated the event.

== Coaching ==
He became a swimming coach in the 1980s. He was a founder and Coach of the Academy of Texas Aquatic Champion Swim Club in Dallas, and coached at Hockaday, a private Dallas girls' school. He later coached Master's Swimming at Ken Cooper Aerobics Center in Dallas. He was married three times. In July 2001, Heidenreich had a mild stroke which left him with a degree of paralysis on his left side. On April 18, 2002, he killed himself with an overdose of prescription medicine at his home in Paris, Texas.

Heidenreich was inducted into the Texas Sports Hall of Fame and the International Swimming Hall of Fame as an "Honor Swimmer" in 1992.

== See also ==
- List of members of the International Swimming Hall of Fame
- List of Olympic medalists in swimming (men)
- List of Southern Methodist University people
- World record progression 4 × 100 metres freestyle relay
- World record progression 4 × 100 metres medley relay
- World record progression 4 × 200 metres freestyle relay
