= Timothy Bach =

Canadian swimmer (born 1953)

Personal information
- Born: 28 February 1953 (age 73) Vancouver, British Columbia, Canada

Sport
- Sport: Swimming
- College team: Simon Fraser Red Leafs
Medal record
Men's swimming
Representing Canada
Pan American Games
Silver medal – second place	1971 Cali	4×100 m freestyle

Timothy Bach (born 28 February 1953) is a Canadian former swimmer. He competed in the men's 4 × 100 metre freestyle relay at the 1972 Summer Olympics.
