= Frank Heckl =

American swimmer

Personal information
- Full name: Frank Heckl
- National team: United States
- Born: c. 1950

Sport
- Sport: Swimming
- Strokes: Freestyle, butterfly
- College team: University of Southern California
Medal record
Men's swimming
Representing the United States
Pan American Games
Gold medal – first place	1971 Cali	100 m freestyle
Gold medal – first place	1971 Cali	200 m freestyle
Gold medal – first place	1971 Cali	100 m butterfly
Gold medal – first place	1971 Cali	4×100 m freestyle
Gold medal – first place	1971 Cali	4×200 m freestyle
Gold medal – first place	1971 Cali	4×100 m medley
Silver medal – second place	1971 Cali	200 m medley
Universiade
Gold medal – first place	1970 Turin	100 m freestyle
Gold medal – first place	1970 Turin	4×100 m freestyle
Gold medal – first place	1970 Turin	4×200 m freestyle
Gold medal – first place	1970 Turin	4×100 m medley

Frank Heckl (born c. 1950) is an American former competition swimmer, seven-time Pan American Games medalist, and former world record-holder in two relay events.

At the 1971 Pan American Games in Cali, Colombia, Heckl won a remarkable seven medals, six of them gold and one silver. His gold medal performances included three individual races: the 100- and 200-meter freestyle, and 100-meter butterfly (56.92); and three relay races: the 4x100-meter freestyle (3:32.15), 4x200-meter freestyle (7:45.82), and 4x100-meter medley (3:56.08). He also won a silver medal in the 200-meter medley (2:12.11).

Heckl attended the University of Southern California (USC), where he swam for the USC Trojans swimming and diving team from 1969 to 1972. As Trojan swimmer, he was a member of seven NCAA championship relay teams.

Heckl subsequently graduated from USC with his bachelor's and medical degrees, and has served as a team doctor for the U.S. national team, including the 1984 Olympics. As of 2015, he works in New Mexico as an orthopaedic surgeon specializing in sports medicine and arthroscopy.

== See also ==
- World record progression 4 × 100 metres freestyle relay
- World record progression 4 × 200 metres freestyle relay
