= Brazil at the 1971 Pan American Games =

- IOC code: BRA
- NOC: Brazilian Olympic Committee
- Website: www.cob.org.br

in Cali July 30 – August 13, 1971
- Competitors: 158 in 17 sports
- Flag bearer: Nelson Prudêncio
- Medals Ranked 4th: Gold 9 Silver 7 Bronze 14 Total 30

Pan American Games appearances (overview)
- 1951; 1955; 1959; 1963; 1967; 1971; 1975; 1979; 1983; 1987; 1991; 1995; 1999; 2003; 2007; 2011; 2015; 2019; 2023; 2027

Brazil competed at the 6th Pan American Games held in Cali, Colombia from July 30 to August 13, 1971

== Medals ==
Medal	Name(s)	Sport	Event	Date	Ref
Silver	Silvina Pereira	Athletics	Women's long jump	1 August 1971	
Bronze	Aída dos Santos	Athletics	Women's pentathlon	5 August 1971	
Silver	Nelson Prudêncio	Athletics	Men's triple jump	5 August 1971	
Gold	Men's basketball team: Adilson Nascimento Carlos Domingo Massoni Emil Assad Rached Francisco Sérgio García Hélio Rubens José Aparecido Luiz Cláudio Menon Luiz Martins de Mello Marcos Leite Milton Setrini Roberto José Corrêa Washington Joseph	Basketball	Men's tournament	12 August 1971	
Gold	Women's basketball team: Benedita Castro Delcy Ellender Marques Elza Pacheco Jacy Azevedo Laís Silva Maria Helena Campos Maria Helena Cardoso Marlene José Bento Nadir Bazani Nilza Monte Garcia Norma Pinto de Oliveira Odila Camargo	Basketball	Women's tournament		
Silver	Waldemar de Oliveira	Boxing	Men's light heavyweight (-81 kg)		
Bronze	Vicente de Campo	Boxing	Men's heavyweight (+81 kg)		
Silver	Luis Carlos Flores	Cycling	Men's race individual (road)		
Silver	Arthur Cramer Ribeiro; Darío Amaral; José Maria Pereira; Marcos Borges	Fencing	Men's épée team		
Gold	Edgard Gijsen; Harri Klein	Rowing	Men's double sculls		
Gold	Atalibio Magioni; Celenio Martins Silva; Manuel Tereso Novo	Rowing	Men's coxed pair-oared shells		
Silver	Milton Teixeira; Wandir Kuntze	Rowing	Men's coxless pair-oared shells		
Gold	Érico de Souza; Miguel Bancov; Milton Teixeira; Wandir Kuntze	Rowing	Men's coxless four-oared shells		
Gold	Jörg Bruder	Sailing	Finn class		
Gold	João Pedro Reinhard; Ralph Christian	Sailing	Snipe class		
Gold	Manfred Shaaffhausen; Mario Buckup; Peter Ficker	Sailing	Lightning class		
Gold	Bertino Alves de Souza	Shooting	Men's 50m pistol		
Silver	José Aranha	Swimming	Men's 100m freestyle	11 August 1971	
Bronze	José Sylvio Fiolo	Swimming	Men's 100m breaststroke	6 August 1971	
Bronze	Flávio Dutra Machado; José Aranha; Paulo Zanetti; Ruy de Oliveira	Swimming	Men's 4 × 100 m freestyle relay	7 August 1971	
Bronze	Alfredo Machado; Flávio Dutra Machado; José Aranha; Ruy de Oliveira	Swimming	Men's 4 × 200 m freestyle relay	9 August 1971	
Bronze	César Lourenço; Flávio Dutra Machado; José Aranha; José Sylvio Fiolo	Swimming	Men's 4 × 100 m medley relay	11 August 1971	
Bronze	Lucy Burle	Swimming	Women's 100m butterfly	8 August 1971	
Bronze	Lucila Martins; Lucy Burle; Maria Hungerbuler; Rosemary Ribeiro	Swimming	Women's 4 × 100 m freestyle relay	10 August 1971	
Bronze	Men's volleyball team: Aderval Arvani Alexandre Abeid Antônio Carlos Moreno Décio Cattaruzzi Jorge Delano Hélio de Oliveira João Jens Jorge Américo de Souza Lino de Melo Gama Luiz Zech Mário Procopio Bebeto de Freitas	Volleyball	Men's tournament		
Bronze	Luiz de Almeida	Weightlifting	Men's light heavyweight (-82,5 kg) – clean and jerk		
Bronze	Thamer Chaim	Weightlifting	Men's heavyweight (-110 kg) – press		
Bronze	Thamer Chaim	Weightlifting	Men's heavyweight (-110 kg) – snatch		
Bronze	Thamer Chaim	Weightlifting	Men's heavyweight (-110 kg) – clean and jerk		
Bronze	Thamer Chaim	Weightlifting	Men's heavyweight (-110 kg) – total		

Medals by sport
Sport	1st place, gold medalist(s)	2nd place, silver medalist(s)	3rd place, bronze medalist(s)	Total
Rowing	3	1	0	4
Sailing	3	0	0	3
Basketball	2	0	0	2
Shooting	1	0	0	1
Athletics	0	2	1	3
Swimming	0	1	6	7
Boxing	0	1	1	2
Cycling	0	1	0	1
Fencing	0	1	0	1
Weightlifting	0	0	5	5
Volleyball	0	0	1	1
Total	9	7	14	30

== See also ==
- Brazil at the 1972 Summer Olympics
- List of Pan American medalists for Brazil
