= John Murphy (swimmer) =

American swimmer (born 1953)

Personal information
- Full name: John Joseph Murphy
- National team: United States
- Born: July 19, 1953 (age 73) Chicago, Illinois, U.S.
- Height: 6 ft 5 in (1.96 m)
- Weight: 194 lb (88 kg)

Sport
- Sport: Swimming
- Strokes: Backstroke, freestyle
- Club: Hinsdale Swim Club; Hinsdale Central High
- College team: Indiana University 1975
- Coach: James Counsilman (Indiana); Don Watson (Hinsdale Central)
Medal record
Men's swimming
Representing the United States
Olympic Games
| Gold medal – first place | 1972 Munich | 4×100 m freestyle |
| Bronze medal – third place | 1972 Munich | 100 m backstroke |
World Championships (LC)
| Gold medal – first place | 1973 Belgrad | 4×100 m freestyle |
| Gold medal – first place | 1975 Cali | 4×100 m freestyle |
| Gold medal – first place | 1975 Cali | 4x100 m medley |
| Silver medal – second place | 1975 Cali | 100 m backstroke |
Pan American Games
| Gold medal – first place | 1971 Cali | 4×100 m medley |
| Silver medal – second place | 1971 Cali | 100 m backstroke |

John Joseph Murphy (born July 19, 1953) is an American former backstroke and freestyle swimmer who attended Indiana University and won a gold in the 4x100 freestyle relay and a bronze medal in the 100-meter backstroke at the 1972 Summer Olympics in Munich. Beginning around the mid-1980s, he worked as a CPA in New Mexico, and coached age group swimming in Los Alamos and Santa Fe.

== Hinsdale Central High School ==
Born in the Chicago area on July 19, 1953, he swam Hinsdale Central High School, in the Chicago suburb of Hinsdale, and was coached by Don Watson. An exceptionally dominant team in Illinois, in March, 1969, Hinsdale Central convincingly won the Illinois State Championship in Evanston, with Murphy finishing first in the 100-yard backstroke with a time of 1:02.4. By January, 1970, Murphy was rated the third best backstroker in the State of Illinois. In March, 1970, Murphy helped lead Hinsdale High to the Illinois State championships again for their fourth straight year, swam on a winning 200-yard medley relay, and took first in the 100-yard backstroke with a meet record time of 53.2.

Murphy's Hinsdale team won the Illinois State Championship again in 1971, and dominated the meet, with Murphy winning the 200 Individual Medley in 1:56.6, and the 100-backstroke in :52.4, a State and National record. John Kinsella, a fellow 1972 Olympic gold medal winner, swam for Hinsdale Central High School with Murphy and was often a major factor in their frequent Illinois State Championship wins. A 1971 graduate of Hinsdale, in his Senior year, Murphy was elected Captain of the swim team.

== Indiana University ==
He attended Indiana University, where he swam for coach James Counsilman's Indiana Hoosiers swim team in National Collegiate Athletic Association (NCAA) competition. At Indiana, he earned letters in swimming in 1972, 1973, 1974 and 1975. At the peak of his collegiate career, he routinely swam very high mileage in his training. In NCAA competition, he swam on three champion relay teams. At the conference level, he earned Big Ten titles in both the years 1974 and 1975 in the 100 freestyle and specializing in relay competition, swam on five Big Ten championship relay teams. He was co-captain of the Indiana Team in his Senior Year in 1975.

== 1972 Olympics ==
Around the age of 19, Murphy won a gold medal as a member of the U.S. team in the men's 4×100-meter freestyle relay at the 1972 Summer Olympics in Munich, Germany with a world record breaking combined time of 3:26.42. He also earned a bronze medal in the 1972 Olympics in the men's 100-meter backstroke. He finished fourth in the 100 m freestyle, which excluded him from medal contention.

=== International competition ===
Murphy won a gold medal at the first World Aquatics Championships (FINA) in the 4×100 metres freestyle in Yugoslavia in 1973, where he swam with Joe Bottom, Jim Montgomery, and Mel Nash, who was not an Olympian. At the 1975 World Aquatics Championships, he won two gold medals, one in the 4×100 metres freestyle with Jim Montgomery, Bruce Furniss, and Andy Coan and one in the 4×100 metres medley where he swam with Rick Colella, Andy Coan, and Greg Jagenburg.

At the August, 1971 Pan American Games in Cali, Colombia, Murphy captured a gold in the 4x100-meter medley, and a silver in the 100-meter backstroke.

Murphy was part of two world 4 x 100 freestyle relay record breaking teams. The first 4x100 relay record was 3:26.42 set at the 1972 Olympics in Munich, Germany, as noted above, and held from 28 August 1972 - 1 September 1974. His second 4x100 relay world record was 3:24.85 set in Cali, Colombia and held from 25 July 1975 - 28 August 1977.

=== Honors ===
In 2015, Murphy was inducted into the Indiana University Athletics Hall of Fame, and in the same year into the Hinsdale Central Foundation Hall of Fame, an honorary sponsored by his High School.

=== Post swimming career ===
Majoring in Finance at Indiana, Murphy passed the CPA exam after graduation. Around ten years after graduating from Indiana, he moved to New Mexico, and has resided in Los Alamos, where he served as a youth swim team coach as a volunteer. After his move, he was Head Coach of the Dolphins de Santa Fe Swim team in 1984 in Santa Fe, New Mexico. He has had a successful accounting business as a CPA in Santa Fe, New Mexico, about 30 miles Southeast of Los Alamos, and has served as the head coach of the Los Alamos Swim Club, an age group team for ages 6-17, also known as the Los Alamos Aquatomics. In Santa Fe, he was head coach of Santa Fe High School beginning in 1990, and also coached the Santa Fe Seals in 2017.

== See also ==
- List of Indiana University (Bloomington) people
- List of Olympic medalists in swimming (men)
- List of World Aquatics Championships medalists in swimming (men)
- World record progression 4 × 100 metres freestyle relay
- John Kinsella, 1972 Olympian and Hinsdale Central swimmer
