= Jim McConica =

American swimmer (born 1950)

Personal information
- Full name: James Banker McConica
- Nickname: "Jim"
- National team: United States
- Born: December 19, 1950 (age 75) Ventura, California
- Education: University of Southern California (1974 Business Finance) (1975 Masters Business Admin.)
- Occupations: Lifeguard; Auto Dealership Manager, Owner (McConica Motors)
- Spouse: Dona Harrington (1984)
- Children: 4 daughters

Sport
- Sport: Swimming
- Events: 100, 200, 400, 1500 freestyle 4x100, 4x200 freestyle relays
- Strokes: Freestyle
- Club: Los Angeles Athletic Club (LAAC) (College Summers); Buenaventura Masters (California); Pleasant Valley Masters (California)
- College team: University of Southern California
- Coach: Mason Parish (Buena High School); Peter Daland (USC Swimming); Ronald Severa (USC Water Polo)
Medal record
Men's swimming
Representing the United States
Pan American Games
Gold medal – first place	1971 Cali	400 m freestyle
Gold medal – first place	1971 Cali	4x200 m freestyle
Silver medal – second place	1971 Cali	200 m freestyle
Summer Universiade
Gold medal – first place	1970 Turin	4x100 m freestyle
Gold medal – first place	1970 Turin	4x200 m freestyle
Bronze medal – third place	1973 Moscow	1500 m freestyle

James Banker McConica (born December 19, 1950) is an American former competition water polo player, swimmer and world record-holder, from Ventura, California, who attended the University of Southern California in Los Angeles, where he competed in both swimming and water polo and received All American honors in swimming from 1970-1973. Competing in swimming, his primary sport, he won four gold medals, a silver and a bronze in Pan American Games and Summer Universiade competition between 1970-1973, in the 200, 400, and 1500 meter freestyle and the 4x100 and 4x200 freestyle relay events. His international gold medals were primarily in relay events and he was part of the 1971 U.S. Team at the Pan American Games that set a world record in the 4x200 freestyle relay. After completing his elite career in international swimming competition, he excelled as a U.S. Master's swimmer, particularly from 1982-2023, where he completed over 300 top ten national age group finishes, and set age group world records for swimmers from ages 50–69. He was an accomplished open water swimmer, completing both the English Channel four times and setting a record for the Catalina Island Swim which he completed three times. In career pursuits, he worked as a lifeguard for Los Angeles County. After completing his BA in Business from USC, and a Masters in Business Administration, he worked his way up from the Sales floor beginning in 1978 to General Manager and co-owner of the family auto dealership McConica Motors in Ventura.

== Early life ==
McConica was born December 19, 1950 in Ventura, California, a middle child of three siblings to father Charles and mother Rosena McConica. Jim's father Charles owned the car dealership McConica Motors, a family business on Thompson Boulevard in Ventura. Staying close to home, Jim attended Saticoy Elementary School, and Balboa Middle School. He swam for Ventura's Buena High School, where he was managed by swim Coach Mason Parrish and graduated in 1969. In addition to swimming, McConica played for his High School's water polo team also under Coach Parrish, where he was a contributor, though the vast majority of media coverage focused on McConica's achievements with his high school and college swim teams. In interviews, McConica said he did not consider himself an outstanding water polo player in high school or college though he greatly enjoyed the game. Nonetheless, he was voted a third team All-CIF Water Polo player in December 1968, as a Senior at Buena High School and had made Honorable Mention as a Junior in 1967. Recognized nationally in swimming during his time at Buena High, in the 200 and 400 freestyle events he was ranked in the top six among American high school swimmers.

=== High school swimming ===
Participating in the Southern Section CIF State Swimming Championships for his High School in 1969, he swam the last leg in a 4x100 freestyle relay that won the Southern Section championship. The victory has remained one of very few Southern Section California State titles ever won by a boy's sport at Buena High. McConica was an All-American at Buena High School in both 1968 and 1969, and as noted, led Buena High to the California Interscholastic Federation Southern Section Swimming Championship in 1969, where he held the most points scored by a participant. In both 1968 and 1969, he was voted the Athlete of the Year for Buena High. In a Buena High Channel League meet on April 11, 1969, McConica set a record for his High School of 49.5 in the 100-yard freestyle, and also won the 200-yard freestyle. By April, 1969, he had set a new Channel League record for the 50-yard freestyle of 22.7.

== International competition highlights ==
Focusing on swimming as his sport in international competition, McConica won two gold medals at the 1971 Pan American Games in Cali, Colombia, including the men's 400-meter freestyle, where he broke an American record with a Pan American record time of 4:09, and the 4x200-meter freestyle relay. He also received a Pan Am silver medal in 1971 in Cali, Colombia for his second-place finish in the 200-meter freestyle. The American gold medal team in the 4x200-meter freestyle relay set a new world record of 7:45.8. In the 1970 Summer Universiade in Turin, he set relay records and won gold medals in the 4x100 m freestyle, and the 4x200 m freestyle. At the 1973 Summer Universiade in Moscow, he won a bronze medal in the 1500 m freestyle.

=== University of Southern California ===
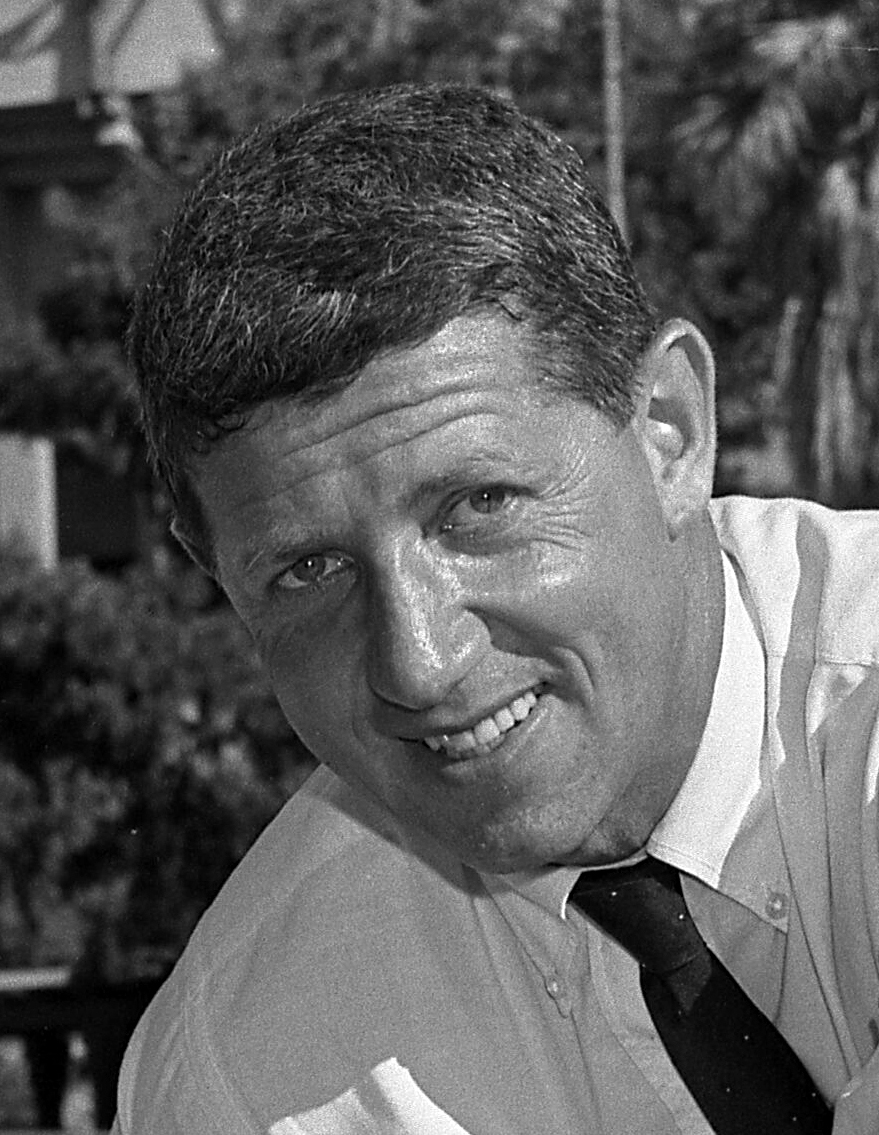
Coach Peter Daland, 1964

He attended the University of Southern California on scholarship from around 1969-1974, where he was trained and managed in swimming by Hall of Fame Coach Peter Daland, and was honored as an All American swimmer in 1973, 1972, 1971, and 1970. Daland, who coached USC from 1958-1992, led the team to 9 NCAA championships, and was an Olympic coach in 1972. Captaining the team as an upperclassman, McConica won six NCAA titles in NCAA National competition, which included titles in the 200 freestyle in both 1973 and 1971. He also played water polo for USC under USA Water Polo Hall of Fame Coach Ronald Severa, who coached water polo at USC as Head Coach from 1964-1976. McConica was only the second swimmer to go under 1:40 for the 200 freestyle after Mark Spitz had formerly gone under the 1:40 mark. In the 1971 NCAA Division I National Championship, swimming against 1972 seven-time gold medalist Mark Spitz of Indiana, and John Kinsella, McConica finished in 1:39.75, the second fastest time ever recorded in the 200, and placed first defeating both Spitz and Kinsella. The time was .05 seconds slower than Spitz's former record time of 1:39, or McConica would have broken the world record. Widely recognized on the national stage, McConica's USC trojan swimming team placed second in the Division I team competition at the NCAA national championships each year from 1970-1973, with James Counsilman's University of Indiana Swimming team placing first.

Majoring in Business Finance, he graduated USC in 1974, and later received a Masters in Business Administration in 1975.

While training for the 1972 Munich Olympics, he continued to be managed by his USC Coach Peter Daland, who would coach the U.S. men's team at the 1972 Olympics, and coached the Los Angeles Athletic Club for a period. Daland noted McConica's limitations in long course swimming. As a fifty meter pool has half as many turns as a 25-meter pool, McConica, who was fast on turns, had poorer times in 25-meter pools, or long course competition. During college summers, McConica trained with the Los Angeles Athletic Club, particularly in preparation for the 1972 Olympic trials where swimming two practices a day he could total 10 miles. McConica retired from elite swimming competition around 1973, though he would become a devoted Masters swimmer in later years.

=== 1972 Olympic trials ===
McConica participated in the August, 1972 U.S. Olympic trials at Portage Park in Chicago, Illinois, competing in the 200 freestyle event and the 1,500 meter freestyle event, though he was unable to qualify for the Olympics in either event. In the 200-freestyle event he was only 1/10 of a second from qualifying and placed fourth. Though he had a redeeming year swimming at USC in 1973, he attributed his long break from competitive swimming after 1973 partly to failing to qualify for the U.S. Olympic team, as he had harbored strong hopes of competing on a U.S. Olympic team. He attended the 1972 Munich Olympics but only as an observer. He retired from elite swimming not long after graduating USC in 1973, and did not return to serious swim training until around 1982.

=== United States Masters Swimming ===
By 1983, he had established six American age group records participating in the United States Masters Swimming Championships. During his many years of participation, particularly from 1982-2023, McConica had top ten age group finishes 344 times, and in relay events he had top ten Masters age group finishes 80 times. He has held freestyle senior swimming world records in all four age brackets from 50–54 to 65–69. He swam for the Ventura County Masters Club, part of the Buenaventura Swim Club. In the 1980s he starting his Master's career with the Pleasant Valley Aquatic USMS Master's Club in Camarillo, California, 15 miles west of Ventura, where he was coached by Sandy Nielson a former Olympic swimmer in 1972. He was a 2001 U.S. Masters Swimmer of the Year, and continued to hold nine National U.S. Masters age group records spanning age groups 50-69, which included the 400, 500, 800, 1500, and 1650 freestyle. His open water training and frequent masters practices provided the endurance to excel in senior age group distance events.

=== Open water swimming ===
Beginning long distance swimming at age 30 as a hobby around 1981, he had successfully traversed the English Channel four times by 2004, a distance usually just over twenty miles that includes both unpredictable currents, cold temperatures, jellyfish, and occasional disruptive shipping traffic. His best time for the Channel swim was 8:39 in 1988, when he was 38. Coached by Diane Baxter, he completed the Catalina Island swim in 1983 in 8 hours 27 minutes, a frequently performed American swim from Southern California to Catalina Island, usually plagued with jellyfish, and similar in distance to the English Channel swim. His September, 1983 Catalina swim, set a record of 8:27.24 that held for ten years, breaking the 1977 record of 8:33 held for six years set by long distance swimmer Penny Dean. In addition to completing the Catalina Channel swim three times, he has participated in a number of swims of distances of around 15 miles or 25 kilometers. Beginning on October 17, 1996, McConica attempted a long distance group swim from the Palos Verdes Peninsula in California to Catalina Island and back with five other swimmers each completing several three mile segments, attempting to set a record by completing the distance of roughly 40 miles in under 20 hours. He completed a swim from Santa Cruz Island to Oxnard, California in 8 hours 29 minutes in 2013, and on October 2, 2012, established a record for traversing the Anapaca Channel from Anapaca Island to the California mainland in 4:38.

=== Careers ===
Jim worked for many years with the Beach Patrol of Los Angeles County, often stationed on Zuma Beach. After completing USC with a degree in Business Finance in 1974, and then receiving an MBA, he initially worked as a lending officer for Bank of America in greater Los Angeles for four years through around 1978. Beginning as a salesman in 1978, he has been an owner, co-owner, general manager, and both sales and financial manager of the family Auto dealership McConica Motors. Dealing largely General Motors, Pontiac, and Buick trucks, his grandfather started the Ventura area family business in 1929, eventually passing the business on to Jim's father Charles, with an Uncle, brother, and a cousin also working at times for the business. The family also owned a successful lemon orchard near Santa Paula, California. As a professional avocation, McConica enjoyed raising funds and managing the finances for community projects such as building a pool at Buena High, his alma mater, and striving to secure a pool at nearby Oxnard High School, about 10 miles Southeast of Ventura. He was a treasurer for a condominium association and on the Board of Directors for another, and served as a guest speaker for a few local community service organizations.

=== Honors ===
In a particularly distinguished honor, McConica was admitted to the International Swimming Hall of Fame for his achievements as a Masters Swimmer. In a more local honor, he is a member of the Ventura County Sports Hall of Fame. McConica was presented with the University of Southern California's J. Kimball Award for maintaining a positive attitude during his athletic career.

=== Marriage, family ===
In the Fall of 1984, he married wife Dona Harrington, whom he had met at Buena High School, and the couple raised four daughters from prior marriages, two of McConica's and two of Dona Harrington's. Jim raised his family in greater Ventura county, where he lived most of is life.

== See also ==
- List of University of Southern California people
- World record progression 4 × 200 metres freestyle relay
