= Steve Genter =

American swimmer (born 1951)

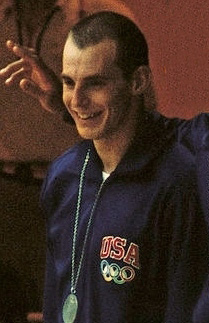
- Genter at the 1972 Olympics after 200m Silver medal

Personal information
- Full name: Robert Steven Genter
- Nicknames: "Steve", "Curly"
- National team: United States
- Born: January 4, 1951 (age 75) Artesia, California, U.S.
- Height: 6 ft 5 in (1.96 m)
- Weight: 185 lb (84 kg)
- Spouse: Erika Ruegg

Sport
- Sport: Swimming
- Strokes: Freestyle
- Club: Lakewood Aquatics Club
- College team: University of California, Los Angeles
Medal record
Men's swimming
Representing the United States
Olympic Games
Gold medal – first place	1972 Munich	4×200 m freestyle
Silver medal – second place	1972 Munich	200 m freestyle
Bronze medal – third place	1972 Munich	400 m freestyle
Pan American Games
Gold medal – first place	1971 Cali	4×100 m freestyle
Gold medal – first place	1971 Cali	4×200 m freestyle
Silver medal – second place	1971 Cali	400 m freestyle
Universiade
Silver medal – second place	1970 Turin	400 m freestyle
Silver medal – second place	1970 Turin	1500 m freestyle

Robert Steven Genter (born January 4, 1951) is an American former competition swimmer and three-time Olympic medalist. He was a freestyle specialist who earned a gold medal as a member of the winning U.S. team in the 4×200-meter freestyle relay at the 1972 Summer Olympics in Munich, Germany. He also won silver medals at the Munich Olympics in the 200-meter and 400-meter freestyle events.

In high school, where he attended Lakewood High, in Lakewood, California, part of the Long Beach School District, Genter was an All-American in both swimming and water polo. He swam for the Lakewood Aquatics Club. He sat out from swimming for a good part of his Senior year in High School due to sinus infections.

In the 1970 Universiade in Turin Italy, he took a silver in the 400 and 1500 Meter freestyles. In later competitions, Genter would shave his head before swim meets, for which he was given the nickname "Curly".

== Career ==
=== 1971 Pan Am Games ===
At the 1971 Pan American Games he won gold in the 4×100 metre freestyle (with Dave Edgar, Jerry Heidenreich, and the non-Olympian Frank Heckl) as well as in the 4×200 metre freestyle (with Jerry Heidenreich and the non-Olympians Jim McConica and Frank Heckl) and silver in the 400 metres freestyle. Steve's only AAU championship came in the indoor 200 yard free in 1972.

=== 1972 Olympics ===
At the 1972 Olympics, he had a collapsed lung about a week before the 200-meter freestyle event, possibly brought on by a persistent cough and altitude changes during the cramped plane ride to Munich. On August 24, only five days prior to his first competition, Genter underwent a relatively minor surgical procedure to reinflate his lung with a tube, but he received thirteen stitches, and spent five days of full rest mostly in bed recovering with a few lung rehabilitation and light torso exercises given to him by his coach Jim Montrella. He took only a day of light swim training before his first competition on September 29.

==== 200-meter silver ====
Several American doctors felt Genter could compete, but German doctors advised him to withdraw. Genter refused and with the consent of his coach, competed. Remarkably in his first race, he won a silver medal in the 200-meter swim against rival Mark Spitz, who took the gold. In the 200-meter qualifying heat on the morning of August 29, Genter finished only 0.13 seconds behind Spitz who, like other qualifiers, was conserving energy. In the final medal race for the 200-meter later on August 29, Genter finished about a second behind Spitz, about a body length, but actually led by a tiny margin at the 100-meter mark until the last 25 meters of the event when Spitz finished strong. Despite his injury, Genter swam a personal best time of 1:53:73, holding off the third-place finisher Werner Lampe by about a quarter of a second. Genter was barred from taking pain medication due to Olympic rules, and had light bleeding. He may have had additional pain after he ripped a few stitches at his 100-meter turn at the halfway mark.

==== 4x200-meter relay gold medal ====
Two days later on August 31, Genter won a gold in the 4 x 200 meter relay where he swam third, helping to set a World Record relay time, though he sat out the qualifying heat to conserve energy. His time of 1:52:72 gave the Americans a considerable lead, and Mark Spitz finished off the swim, giving the American team a time of 7:43:3.

==== 400-meter bronze medal ====
On September 1, he won a Bronze medal in the 400 meter swim, beating the standing Olympic record in his qualifying heat, though it was not the fastest time of the day. In the 400 meter final, he lost to Brad Cooper by a full 1.67 seconds, but still went under the standing Olympic record time with a 4:01.94.

In late March 1974, after a break from competition, he swam in the NCAA Championships as a Senior at UCLA.

=== Life after swimming ===
Genter was engaged to marry Swiss swimmer, national breast stroke champion, and 1972 Olympic Competitor, Erika Ruegg in Long Beach on September 14, 1974. After his graduation from UCLA, Genter moved to Switzerland, where he lived after the late 1970s. He raised a family of 5 children, worked in the computer industry, and coached water polo, his favorite sport.

== See also ==
- List of Olympic medalists in swimming (men)
- List of University of California, Los Angeles people
- World record progression 4 × 200 metres freestyle relay
