= Alfredo Machado =

Brazilian swimmer (1953–2012)

Personal information
- Full name: Alfredo Carlos Botelho Machado
- Nickname: Fadola
- Born: 3 June 1953 Rio de Janeiro, Rio de Janeiro, Brazil
- Died: 25 September 2012 (aged 59) Rio de Janeiro, Rio de Janeiro, Brazil
- Height: 1.81 m (5 ft 11 in)
- Weight: 72 kg (159 lb)

Sport
- Sport: Swimming
- Strokes: Freestyle
Medal record
Men's swimming
Representing Brazil
Pan American Games
Bronze medal – third place	1971 Cali	4 × 200m free
Universiade
Bronze medal – third place	1973 Moscow	4x200m freestyle

Alfredo Carlos Botelho Machado (3 June 1953 – 25 September 2012) was an international freestyle swimmer from Brazil, who competed at one Summer Olympics for his native country.

He began swimming for Fluminense and then moved to Flamengo.

He was at the 1971 Pan American Games, in Cali, where he won a bronze medal in the 4×200-metre freestyle, breaking the South American record. He also finished 5th in the 400-metre freestyle, 5th in the 400-metre individual medley (breaking the Brazilian record with a time of 4:54.7), 7th in the 200-metre freestyle and 8th in the 1500-metre freestyle.

At the 1972 Summer Olympics, in Munich, he swam the 200-metre freestyle, 400-metre freestyle, 1500-metre freestyle, and the 4×200-metre freestyle, not reaching the finals. He broke the Brazilian record in the 1500-metre freestyle in Munich.

At the 1973 Summer Universiade, in Moscow, Machado won a bronze medal in the 4×200-metre freestyle, along with José Namorado, James Huxley Adams and José Aranha.

He died at age 59.
