= Robert Kasting =

Canadian swimmer (born 1950)

Personal information
- Full name: Robert A. Kasting
- Nickname: "Bob"
- National team: Canada
- Born: August 28, 1950 (age 76) Ottawa, Ontario, canada
- Height: 1.89 m (6 ft 2 in)
- Weight: 80 kg (176 lb)

Sport
- Sport: Swimming
- Strokes: Freestyle, butterfly
- Club: Lethbridge Amateur Swim Club
- College team: Yale University
Medal record
Men's swimming
Representing Canada
Olympic Games
Bronze medal – third place	1972 Munich	4×100 m medley
Commonwealth Games
Gold medal – first place	1970 Edinburgh	4×100 m medley
Silver medal – second place	1966 Kingston	4×110 yd freestyle
Silver medal – second place	1966 Kingston	4×220 yd freestyle
Silver medal – second place	1970 Edinburgh	4×100 m freestyle
Silver medal – second place	1970 Edinburgh	4×200 m freestyle
Pan American Games
Silver medal – second place	1967 Winnipeg	4×100 m freestyle
Silver medal – second place	1967 Winnipeg	4×200 m freestyle
Silver medal – second place	1971 Cali	4×100 m freestyle
Silver medal – second place	1971 Cali	4×200 m freestyle
Bronze medal – third place	1971 Cali	100 m freestyle

Robert A. Kasting (born August 28, 1950) is a Canadian former competition swimmer who specialized in freestyle and butterfly events. Kasting represented Canada at the 1972 Summer Olympics in Munich, Germany, where he won the bronze medal in the men's 4×100-metre medley relay, together with Canadian teammates Erik Fish, Bruce Robertson and William Mahony.

He also competed at the 1966 Commonwealth Games and won silver medals in both the 4×110-yard freestyle and the 4×220-yard freestyle. He also won two silver medals and a gold medal at the 1970 Commonwealth Games, in the 4×100-metre freestyle relay, 4×200-metre freestyle relay, and the 4×100-metre medley relay, respectively. At the 1972 Olympic Games he finished in 10th place in both the 100-metre freestyle and the 100-metre butterfly.

Kastings was a member of the Board of Directors for Calgary Olympic Organizing Committee of the 1988 Winter Olympics.

Kasting attended Yale University in New Haven, Connecticut, where he was a member of the Yale Bulldogs swimming and diving team in National Collegiate Athletic Association (NCAA) and Ivy League competition from 1970 to 1972. He was the Bulldogs team captain as a senior in 1972.

He was born in Ottawa, Ontario, but raised in Lethbridge, Alberta. He attended McGill Law School and practised law in Vancouver in the areas of administrative law and estate litigation. He was a candidate for mayor of Vancouver in fall of 2014.

== See also ==
- List of Commonwealth Games medallists in swimming (men)
- List of Olympic medalists in swimming (men)
