= Mark Spitz =

American Olympic swimmer (born 1950)

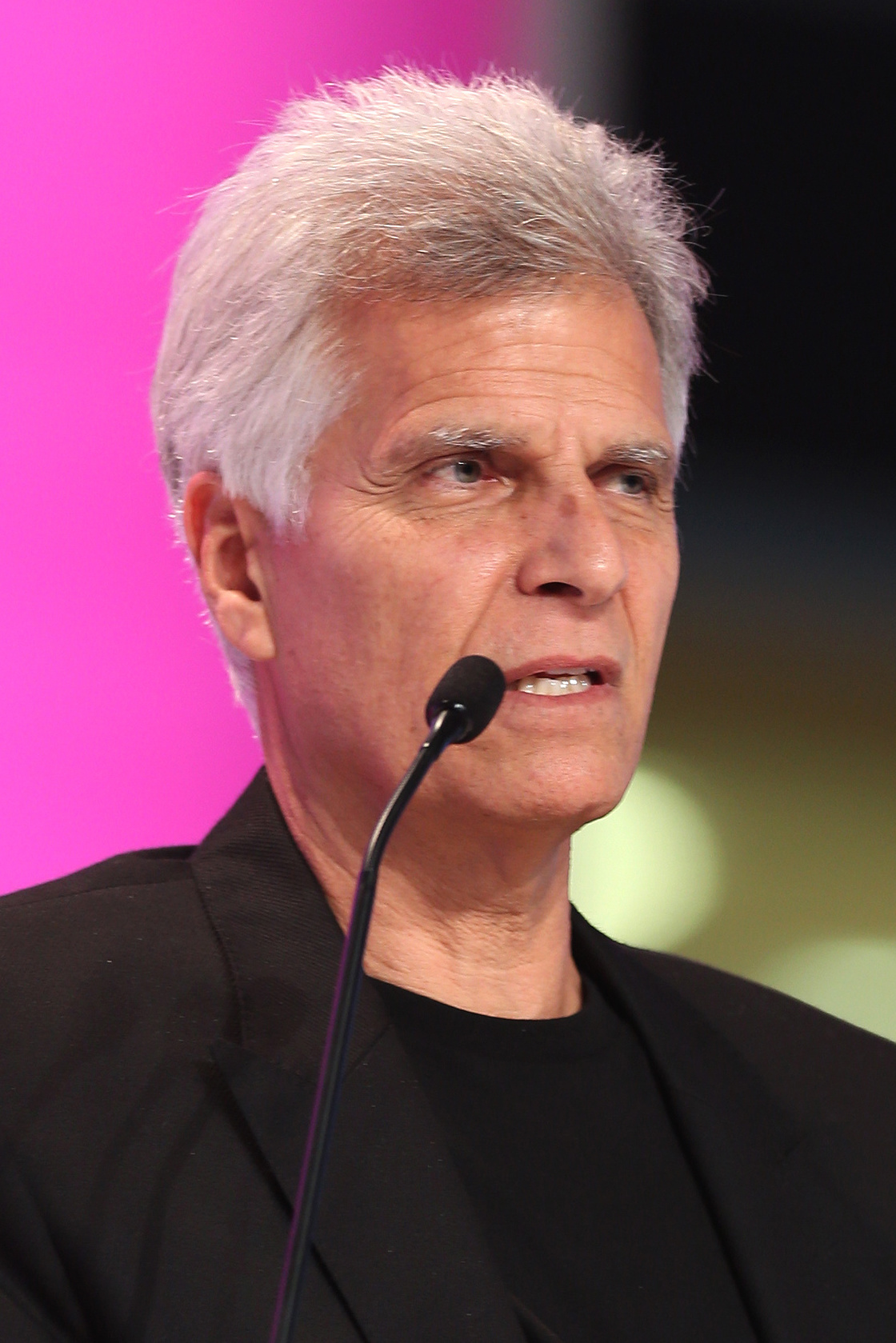
- Spitz in 2012

Personal information
- Full name: Mark Andrew Spitz
- Nickname: "Mark the Shark"
- National team: United States
- Born: February 10, 1950 (age 76) Modesto, California, U.S.
- Height: 6 ft 0 in (183 cm)
- Weight: 161 lb (73 kg)

Sport
- Sport: Swimming
- Strokes: Butterfly, freestyle
- Club: Arden Hills Swim Club; Santa Clara Swim Club
- College team: Indiana University
- Coach: George Haines (Santa Clara); Sherm Chavoor (Arden Hills); Doc Counsilman (Indiana)
Medal record
Representing the United States
| Event | 1st | 2nd | 3rd |
|---|---|---|---|
| Olympic Games | 9 | 1 | 1 |
| Pan American Games | 5 | 0 | 0 |
| Maccabiah Games | 10 | 0 | 0 |
| Total | 24 | 1 | 1 |
Olympic Games
| Gold medal – first place | 1968 Mexico City | 4×100 m freestyle |
| Gold medal – first place | 1968 Mexico City | 4×200 m freestyle |
| Gold medal – first place | 1972 Munich | 100 m butterfly |
| Gold medal – first place | 1972 Munich | 100 m freestyle |
| Gold medal – first place | 1972 Munich | 200 m butterfly |
| Gold medal – first place | 1972 Munich | 200 m freestyle |
| Gold medal – first place | 1972 Munich | 4×100 m freestyle |
| Gold medal – first place | 1972 Munich | 4×100 m medley |
| Gold medal – first place | 1972 Munich | 4×200 m freestyle |
| Silver medal – second place | 1968 Mexico City | 100 m butterfly |
| Bronze medal – third place | 1968 Mexico City | 100 m freestyle |
Pan American Games
| Gold medal – first place | 1967 Winnipeg | 100 m butterfly |
| Gold medal – first place | 1967 Winnipeg | 200 m butterfly |
| Gold medal – first place | 1967 Winnipeg | 4×100 m freestyle |
| Gold medal – first place | 1967 Winnipeg | 4×200 m freestyle |
| Gold medal – first place | 1967 Winnipeg | 4×100 m medley |
Maccabiah Games
| Gold medal – first place | 1965 | 4 Gold medals |
| Gold medal – first place | 1969 | 6 Gold medals |

Mark Andrew Spitz (born February 10, 1950) is an American former competitive swimmer and nine-time Olympic champion. He was the most successful athlete at the 1972 Summer Olympics in Munich, winning seven gold medals, each in world-record time. This achievement set a record that lasted for 36 years, until it was surpassed by fellow American Michael Phelps, who won eight golds at the 2008 Summer Olympics in Beijing. Phelps, like Spitz, set seven world records.

Between 1968 and 1972, Spitz won nine Olympic golds, a silver, and a bronze, in addition to five Pan American golds, 31 Amateur Athletic Union (AAU) titles, and eight National Collegiate Athletic Association (NCAA) titles. During those years he set 35 world records, two of which were in trials and unofficial. Swimming World Magazine named him World Swimmer of the Year in 1969, 1971, and 1972. He was the third athlete to win nine Olympic gold medals.

== Early life ==
Spitz was born on February 10, 1950, in Modesto, California, the eldest of three children of Lenore Sylvia (née Smith) and Arnold Spitz. His family is Jewish; his mother's family, originally surnamed Sklotkovick, was from Russia. When he was two years old, his family moved to Honolulu, Hawaii, where he swam at Waikiki beach every day. "You should have seen that little boy dash into the ocean. He'd run like he was trying to commit suicide," Lenore Spitz told a reporter for Time in 1968. When he was six, the family returned to Sacramento, California, and he began to compete at his local swim club. At age nine, he was training at Arden Hills Swim Club in Sacramento with swimming coach Sherm Chavoor, who mentored six other Olympic medal winners.

At 10, Spitz held one world age-group record and 17 national records. When Spitz was 14, his family moved to Santa Clara, where he joined the Santa Clara Swim Club and was trained by coach George F. Haines. From 1964 to 1968, Spitz trained with Haines at SCSC and Santa Clara High School. During his four years there, Spitz held national high school records in every stroke and in every distance. In 1966 at age 16, he won the 100-meter butterfly at the AAU national championships, the first of his 24 total AAU titles. The following year, Spitz emerged on the world swimming stage when he set his first world record at a small California meet with a time of 4:10.60 in the 400-meter freestyle.

== Swimming career ==
=== Maccabiah Games ===
Spitz swam in his first international competition at the 1965 Maccabiah Games in Israel. At age 15 and weighing 130 pounds, he won four gold medals in Tel Aviv—the 400 m freestyle, the 1500 m freestyle, the 400 m individual medley, and the 800 m freestyle relay—and was named the most outstanding athlete of the Games.

He returned to Israel in 1969 following the Mexico Olympics to again compete, at the 1969 Maccabiah Games, where he won six gold medals and was again named outstanding athlete of the Games.

In 1985, Spitz lit the torch to open the 1985 Maccabiah Games.

In 2005, he was a member of the U.S. delegation at the 2005 Maccabiah Games. He spoke at the JCC Maccabiah Games Opening Ceremonies, which was held in Richmond, Virginia. The Weinstein JCC in Richmond was one of the Host JCC's for the 2005 games, with over 1,000 teenagers participating in various sports, including swimming.

=== Pan American Games ===
He won five gold medals at the 1967 Pan American Games, setting a record that lasted until 2007 when Brazilian swimmer Thiago Pereira won six golds at the XV Pan American Games in Rio de Janeiro.

=== 1968 Olympics ===
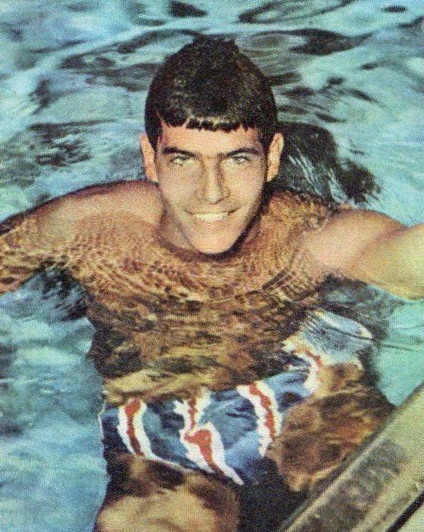
- Spitz c. 1968

Medal record

1968 Mexico City

Representing the USA
| Gold medal – first place | 4×100 m freestyle relay | 3:31.7 |
| Gold medal – first place | 4×200 m freestyle relay | 7:52.3 |
| Silver medal – second place | 100 m butterfly | 56.40 |
| Bronze medal – third place | 100 m freestyle | 53.00 |

Spitz was already the holder of ten world records, and he brashly predicted that he would win six gold medals at the 1968 Summer Olympics in Mexico City. However, he won only two team golds: the 4×100-meter freestyle relay in 3:31.70, and the 4×200-meter freestyle relay in 7:52.33. In addition, Spitz finished second to fellow American Doug Russell in the 100-meter butterfly. He lost to Russell by a half second, despite holding the world record and having beaten Russell the previous ten times they had swum against each other that year. Russell did briefly match Spitz's world record in late August 1967, holding the record equally with Spitz for five days before Spitz regained it solely on October 2, 1967. As a result of being beaten by Russell, Spitz did not get to swim in the 4×100-meter medley relay, which gave Russell his second gold medal and the USA team another world record performance.

=== College training ===
Spitz was disappointed in his 1968 Olympic performance. In January 1969, he decided to attend Indiana University to train with Indiana Hoosiers swimming coach Doc Counsilman, who was also his Olympic coach in Mexico City. He called choosing Indiana and Counsilman "the biggest decision of my life (and) the best." While at Indiana, Spitz won eight individual NCAA titles. In 1971, he won the James E. Sullivan Award as the top amateur athlete in the United States. Spitz also set a number of world records during the U.S. Olympic Swim Trials held in Chicago's Portage Park in 1972.

He was nicknamed "Mark the Shark" by his teammates.

=== 1972 Olympics ===
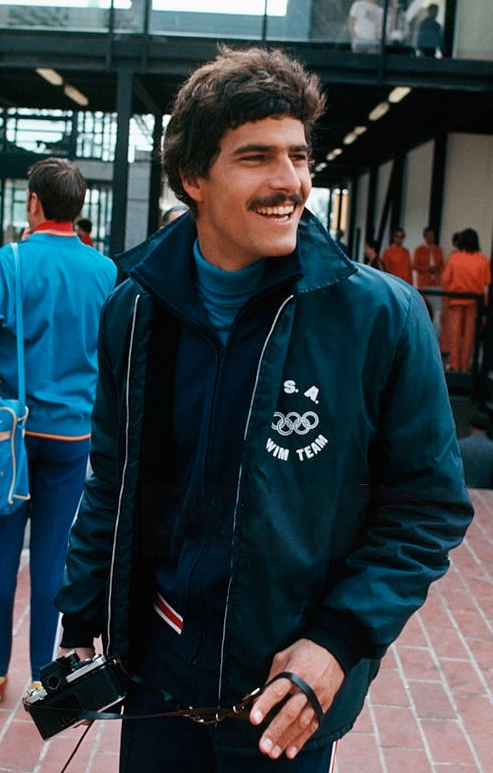
- Spitz at the 1972 Olympics

Medal record

1972 Munich

Representing the USA
| Gold medal – first place | 200 m butterfly | 2:00.70 (WR) |
| Gold medal – first place | 4×100 m freestyle relay | 3:26.42 (WR) |
| Gold medal – first place | 200 m freestyle | 1:52.78 (WR) |
| Gold medal – first place | 100 m butterfly | 54.27 (WR) |
| Gold medal – first place | 4×200 m freestyle relay | 7:35.78 (WR) |
| Gold medal – first place | 100 m freestyle | 51.22 (WR) |
| Gold medal – first place | 4×100 m medley relay | 3:48.16 (WR) |

At the 1972 Summer Olympics in Munich, Spitz was back to repeat his quest for the six gold medals. He did even better, winning seven Olympic gold medals. Furthermore, Spitz set a new world record in each of the seven events – 100-meter freestyle (51.22), 200-meter freestyle (1:52.78), 100-meter butterfly (54.27), 200-meter butterfly (2:00.70), 4×100-meter freestyle relay (3:26.42), 4×200-meter freestyle relay (7:35.78), and 4×100-meter medley relay (3:48.16). Spitz was originally reluctant to swim the 100-meter freestyle, fearing that he would not win the gold medal. Minutes before the race, he confessed on the pool deck to ABC's Donna de Varona, "I know I say I don't want to swim before every event, but this time I'm serious. If I swim six and win six, I'll be a hero. If I swim seven and win six, I'll be a failure." Spitz won by half a stroke in a world-record time of 51.22 seconds.

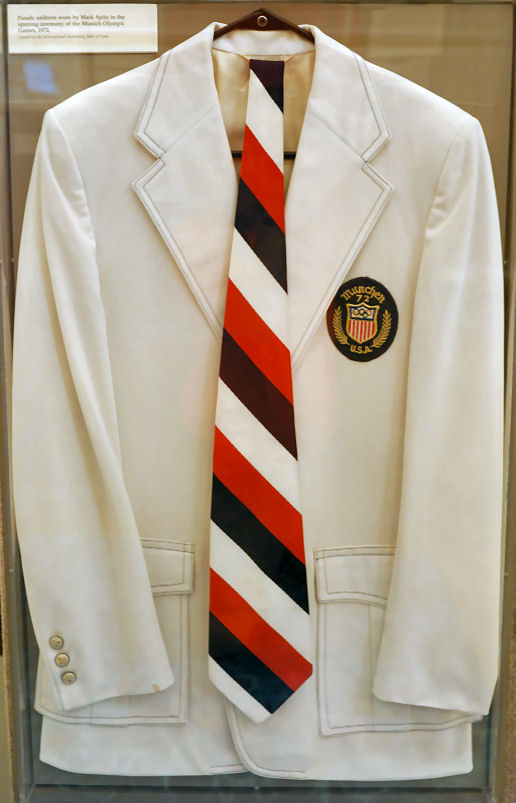
Jacket worn by Mark Spitz during the 1972 Summer Olympics.

Spitz is one of eight Olympians (four of them swimmers) to win nine or more career gold medals: Larisa Latynina, Paavo Nurmi, Carl Lewis, Katie Ledecky, and Caeleb Dressel also have nine; only Michael Phelps and Johannes Høsflot Klæbo have won more, with 23 and 11 respectively. Spitz's record of seven gold medals in a single Olympics was not surpassed until Phelps broke the record at the 2008 Summer Olympics.

After he had completed his events, Spitz left Munich early as a result of the Munich Massacre, where eleven Israeli athletes were taken hostage and later murdered by Palestinian terrorists. Being Jewish himself, there was concern among the Olympic authorities that Spitz would become a likely target for the Palestinians and he was escorted to London for his own safety, briefly with an escort of U.S. Marines.

=== Retirement ===
Following the Munich Olympics, Spitz retired from competition even though he was only 22 years old.

At age 41, Spitz attempted a comeback for the 1992 Summer Olympics after filmmaker Bud Greenspan offered him a million dollars if he succeeded in qualifying. Spitz's comeback attempt made the cover of Parade and was also reported on in Sports Illustrated and Esquire. Filmed by Greenspan's cameras, Spitz was two seconds slower than the Olympic standard and failed to qualify.

In 1999, Spitz ranked No. 33 on ESPN SportsCentury 50 Greatest Athletes, the only aquatic athlete to make the list.

== Hall of Fame ==
- International Swimming Hall of Fame, Inducted 1977.
- International Jewish Sports Hall of Fame, Inducted 1979.
- United States Olympic Hall of Fame, Inducted 1983.
- Southern California Jewish Sports Hall of Fame Inducted 1990.
- San Jose Sports Hall of Fame, inducted Wednesday, November 14, 2007.
- National Jewish Museum Sports Hall of Fame, Inducted 2007.
- Long Beach City College Hall of Fame, Inducted 2007
- Indiana University Athletics Hall of Fame

== Film and television career ==
After Spitz retired from competitive swimming at age 22, he was managed by the William Morris Agency, which tried to get him into show business while he was still a household name due to his athletic success.

A poster featuring Spitz wearing his swimsuit and gold medals led ESPN to retroactively label him "the hottest pin-up since Betty Grable".

In Spitz's TV debut, he appeared as himself in a skit as a dentist on a Bob Hope special that aired October 5, 1972. In 1973–74, Spitz appeared on TV's The Tonight Show Starring Johnny Carson and The Sonny & Cher Comedy Hour. On the TV drama Emergency!, he portrayed Pete Barlow, whose wife (played by Spitz's wife, Suzy) is accidentally shot by a handgun in an overfull drawer. He also appeared briefly on The Dean Martin Celebrity Roast of California Governor Ronald Reagan in September 1973.

Spitz went to work for ABC Sports in 1976 and worked on many sports presentations, including coverage of the 1976 Summer Olympics in Montreal and the 1984 Summer Olympics in Los Angeles. In 1985 he appeared as a TV announcer in Challenge of a Lifetime. He continued as a broadcaster for some time, but within a few years, he was hardly seen as a public figure except perhaps as a commentator for swimming events like the 2004 Summer Olympics. Instead Spitz focused on his real estate company in Beverly Hills and hobbies such as sailing.

Spitz licensed his image for use in the 2001 film, Scotland, PA, which is a spoof of Macbeth set in the 1970s. The character Donald is a huge fan of Mark Spitz and has a poster of him in his bedroom over his television where he watches recordings of Spitz in competition. Director Billy Morrissette's audio commentary notes that they were told when obtaining the license that the poster did not exist when the footage aired. He explained to Spitz's people that the film was a comedy and not going for strict historical accuracy.

=== Narration ===
Spitz narrated Freedom's Fury, a 2006 Hungarian documentary about the Olympic water polo team's Blood in the Water match against the Soviet Union during the Hungarian Revolution of 1956 which was repressed by the Soviet Union—considered among the most famous water polo matches. The film was executive produced by Quentin Tarantino and Lucy Liu, and made its debut at the Tribeca Film Festival.

=== Commercials ===
He appeared in an advertisement for the California Milk Advisory Board. One of his print advertisements featured the caption "I always drink it--is something I like to do. I want to be loved by the mothers."

In 1974, he was in a number of Schick razors commercials. In 1998 he appeared with Evel Knievel in a TV commercial for PlayStation.

In 1982, bestselling author Clive Cussler, mentioned Mark Spitz in the novel "Pacific Vortex!", the origin-story of Dirk Pitt.

In 2004, he appeared in a TV commercial for Sprint PCS. Then in November 2007, Spitz made a cameo appearance on Amanda Beard's first television commercial (for GoDaddy) featuring her own seven Olympic medals (won between 1996 and 2004). The ad was entitled "Shock". Also, in 2007 he appeared in the infomercial for the "Orbitrek Elite" fitness workout.

In 2012, Spitz appeared in a commercial for Ageless Male, a testosterone supplement.

In a 2019 commercial, Spitz pitched a personal EKG device by KardiaMobile.

In 2022, Spitz endorsed the health supplement Relief Factor.

== Personal life ==
=== Family life ===
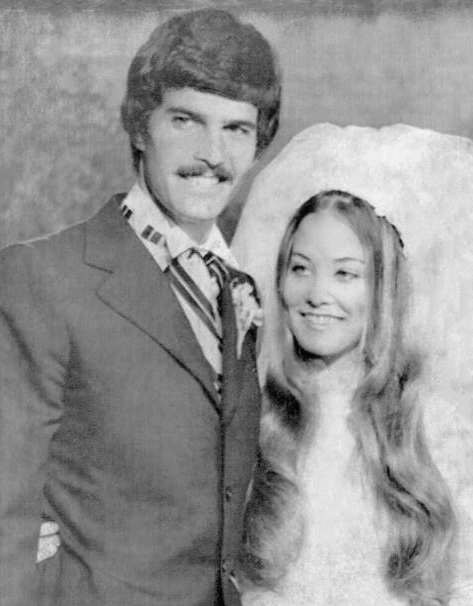
Mark Spitz and Suzy Weiner on their wedding day in May 1973

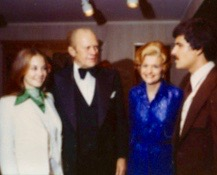
Spitz (far right) and his wife (far left) with President Gerald Ford and First Lady Betty Ford in 1976

When Spitz returned from the Olympics, he began dating Suzy Weiner, a UCLA theater student and part-time model, who also was the daughter of one of his father's business acquaintances. Less than a year after the Munich Olympics, they were married on May 6, 1973, in a traditional Jewish service at the Beverly Hills Hotel. They have two sons, Matthew (born October 1981) and Justin (born September 1991). Justin was a member of the Stanford swim team. Spitz and his wife reside in Los Angeles, California.

=== Education ===
At Indiana University from 1968 to 1972, Spitz was a pre-dental student and member of Phi Kappa Psi fraternity. Time magazine asked him if he wanted to return to dental school after the Olympics. "I always wanted to be a dentist from the time I was in high school, and I was accepted to dental school in the spring of 1972. I was planning to go, but after the Olympics there were other opportunities. I did some television and speaking engagements, and things just went from there." Spitz graduated from Indiana University in 1972.

=== Post-swimming career ===
After Spitz's return to the United States following the 1972 Olympics, he landed several lucrative corporate endorsement contracts. He earned about $7 million in a two-year period. "A million dollars in 1972 would be equivalent to more than $10 million today," Spitz said in 2007. "I did very well, thank you very much." Spitz added, "I would say I was a pioneer. There wasn't anyone who'd gone to the Olympics before me who capitalized the same way on opportunity. It depends on timing, it depends on hype, it depends on the economy, and most importantly, it depends on looks. I mean, I've never seen a magazine of uglies. That's our society. I'm not saying it's right. That's just the facts." Spitz went on to start a real estate company.

Per his official website, Spitz is self-employed as a corporate spokesperson and motivational speaker. However, Yahoo! Sports reported his occupation as stock broker and motivational speaker. According to a 2008 Sports Illustrated interview, "Spitz became a stockbroker in 2002 and has since moved into private equity. He is now also dabbling in the 'water business', as he calls it, and is in negotiations to build a water-bottling facility on aquifer-rich land that he and a business partner own."

Spitz has pursued various entrepreneurial projects with former NBA player Rick Barry. He traveled the world, delivering about 25 lectures a year. His biography, The Extraordinary Life of An Olympic Champion by Richard J. Foster, was released in July 2008.

In July 2012, he endorsed Istanbul's bid to host the 2020 Summer Olympics, but the award went to Tokyo.

=== Hobbies ===
His hobbies include sailing, skiing and collecting art.

=== Famous moustache during Olympics ===
In an era when other swimmers, male and female, were shaving body hair, he swam with a moustache. When asked why he initially grew one, he stated: "I grew the moustache because a coach in college said I couldn't grow one." Spitz said he originally grew the moustache as a form of rebellion against the clean-cut look imposed on him in college. "It took a long time to grow," he said. It took four months to grow, but Spitz was proud of it, and decided the moustache was a "good-luck piece".

Spitz is quoted as saying, "When I went to the Olympics, I had every intention of shaving the moustache off, but I realized I was getting so many comments about it—and everybody was talking about it—that I decided to keep it. I had some fun with a Russian coach who asked me if my moustache slowed me down. I said, 'No, as a matter of fact, it deflects water away from my mouth, allows my rear end to rise and make me bullet-shaped in the water, and that's what had allowed me to swim so great.' According to a Sports Illustrated article, on February 14, 1988, after talking about shaving off his moustache for a year, he finally did. "He looked great with it, don't get me wrong," explained his wife Suzy, "but he looks so handsome without it."

When he was asked why he shaved it off, he responded: "Well, one, I'm not swimming anymore; two, it started to turn gray; and three, my wife had never seen me, nor my family, without the moustache ... I'm happy [without it]." He also commented on his moustache in a live, in-studio interview with KCRA host Mike TeSelle on June 14, 2008, with Spitz stating that he no longer maintains his iconic moustache because it had become "too gray".

=== Health issues ===
After retirement, Spitz was diagnosed with acid reflux disease, a condition from which his physician thinks he suffered throughout his career. "During my Olympic training, I attributed the symptoms [of acid reflux] to an overexposure to chlorine and eating too soon before and after swimming," says Spitz. "It wasn't until the symptoms began to get in the way of my 1976 Olympic broadcasting career in Montreal, which was four years after retirement that I suspected something more serious must be happening."

He has also reported having high cholesterol and other chronic health issues. "People don't believe that I have high cholesterol, but it's a fact," said Spitz. "I take medication every day because my doctor told me that diet and exercise are not enough to keep my cholesterol down." He is a paid spokesperson for Medco, a pharmacy benefit management company.

== Olympic controversies ==
=== 1972 medal podium incident ===
In 1972, Spitz was accused of product placement during the medal ceremony. Following his victory in the 200-meter freestyle, Spitz carried his shoes and arrived barefoot to obtain his gold medal. He put them down as the American national anthem, "The Star-Spangled Banner" was played. After the anthem, he picked up his shoes and waved them to the crowd. The Soviet officials complained to the IOC, claiming the shoes were "clearly identifiable as the product of a West German sporting goods firm." When questioned by the IOC, Spitz explained that the gesture was innocent, the shoes were old, and he was not paid. The IOC cleared him of any wrongdoing.

=== Issues with 2008 Summer Olympics ===
Spitz has said that he felt snubbed by not being asked to attend the 2008 Summer Olympics to watch Michael Phelps attempt to break his seven-gold-medal record: "I never got invited. You don't go to the Olympics just to say, I am going to go. Especially because of who I am. ... I am going to sit there and watch Michael Phelps break my record anonymously? That's almost demeaning to me. It is not almost—it is." Spitz added, "They voted me one of the top five Olympians of all time. Some of them are dead. But they invited the other ones to go to the Olympics, but not me," he said. "Yes, I am a bit upset about it." Spitz has stated that he has no hard feelings towards Phelps.

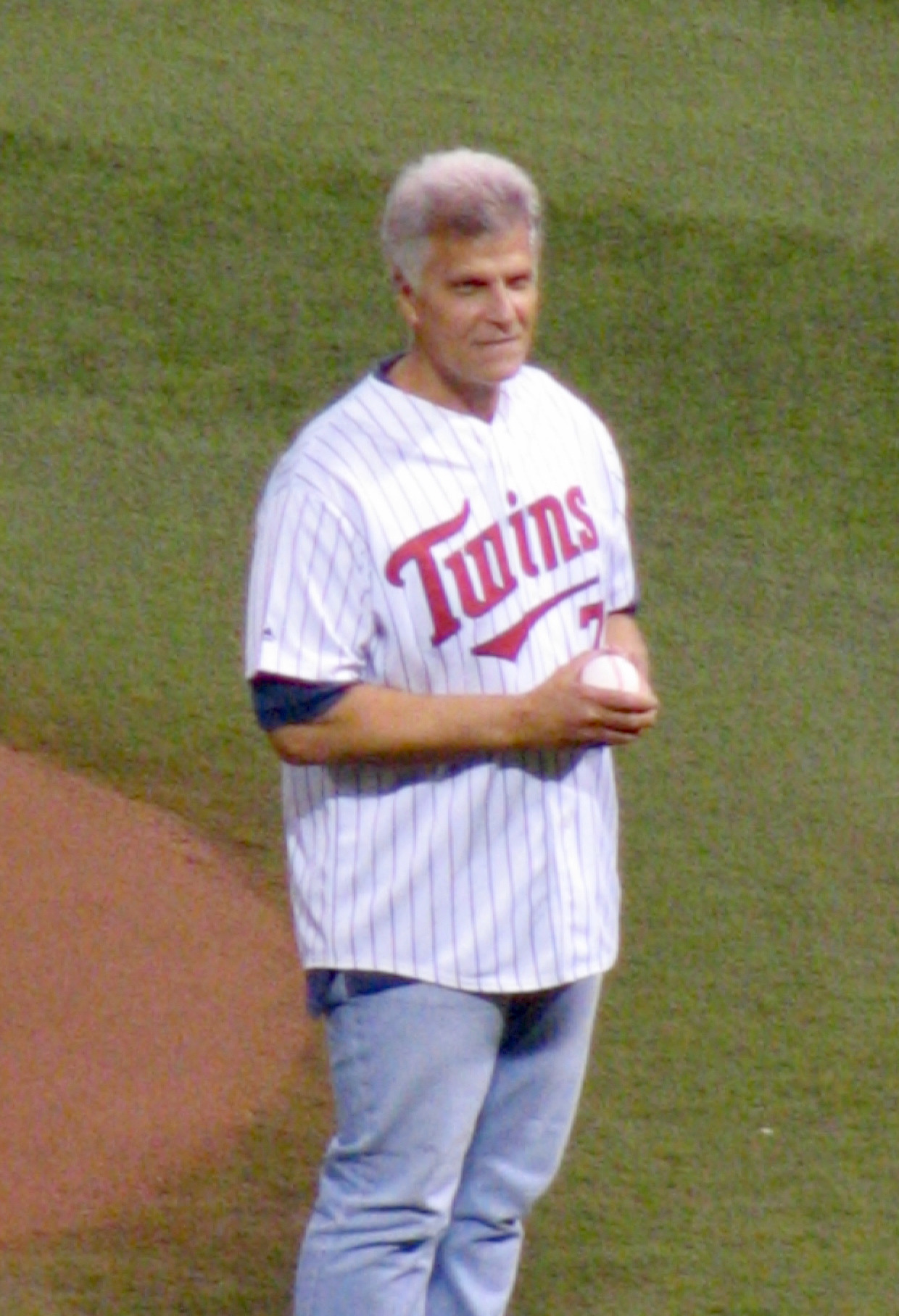
Mark Spitz, throwing first pitch at a baseball game (2008)

However, on August 14, 2008, Spitz appeared on NBC's Today Show where he clarified his statement and his pride in Michael Phelps:

It's about time that somebody else takes the throne. And I'm very happy for him. I really, truly am ... I was working with a corporate sponsor who elected not to bring their US contingent over to China, and they piled on more work for me here in the United States, which was great. So I wasn't able to get to the Olympics and watch Michael in the first couple of days. And they thought, some of these reporters, that I was supposed to be invited by some entity, and I told them that that wasn't really the case, that doesn't happen that way. And so, I'm sort of disappointed that I wasn't there, but, you know, that interview somehow took a different turn, and I've done hundreds and hundreds of them and I've been true to form about the way I feel about Michael, and he's doing a great job for the United States and inspiring a lot of great performances by the other team members.

Also on August 14, 2008, in an interview aired on Los Angeles KNBC-4's morning news show, Today in L.A., Spitz was quoted saying he does believe that "Michael Phelps is the greatest Olympic athlete ever."

On August 15, 2008, as part of an interview on NBC, Spitz said that he felt Phelps's performance in the 100 fly in Beijing was "epic". Spitz paid this compliment to Phelps just two hours after his record-tying seventh gold medal during a live joint interview with Bob Costas:

You know, Bob and Michael, I wondered what I was going to say at this monumental time, when it would happen and who I would say it to, and of course I thought I was going to say it to you for some time now. But, it's the word that comes to mind, "epic". What you did tonight was epic, and it was epic for the whole world to see how great you really are. I never thought for one moment that you were out of that race and contention, because I watched you at Athens win the race by similar margins, and 18 months ago at the World's by similar margins. And, you know, that is a tribute to your greatness. And now the whole world knows. We are so proud of you Michael here in America, and we are so proud of you and the way that you handle yourself, and you represent such an inspiration to all the youngsters around the world. You know, you weren't born when I did what I did, and I'm sure that I was a part of your inspiration, and I take that as a full compliment. And they say that you judge one's character by the company you keep, and I'm happy to keep company with you. And you have a tremendous responsibility for all those people that you are going to inspire over the next number of years, and I know that you will wear the crown well. Congratulations, Mike.

In 2015, Spitz allegedly claimed that he had seen an email from Omega, the official timekeeper, that Phelps had lost the closely contested 100m butterfly final in 2008. He later claimed that his quote had been "misconstrued".

=== Views on drug testing ===
Spitz has been consistent in his criticism of the two swimming world bodies, FINA (now named World Aquatics) and the IOC, in their incomplete attempts to keep drugs out of the sport. He has felt that not enough has been done to monitor and encourage drug-free participation. In 1998 he criticized FINA for its "embarrassing" attempts to stamp out drug abuse, urging them to test for all known drugs. In September 1999 Spitz said the IOC had the technology to test for a plethora of drugs but was refusing to do so because of some IOC member protests.

During a radio interview in Australia, Spitz was quoted as saying "They don't want to test for everything because there's tremendous pressure from the television networks because they want the television to have athletic competitions with the world record holders there for the finals. They want the medals not to be tainted in their value of accomplishment by winning them, and it's all about ratings and commercial selling of time and about money. And an International Olympic Committee has got their hand in the pockets of the network television people, so there's a tremendous conflict of interest in what they should do and what they're doing."

In August 2008, the Los Angeles Times reported that Spitz continued to discuss drug testing and was saying "the IOC has sponsors who demand a good show. Television pays the IOC for the rights to that good show, and its sponsors want that too. Drug news and drug distractions are not a good show. People are not going to tune in to see athletes have their medals taken away from them."

== See also ==
- List of Indiana University (Bloomington) people
- List of multiple Olympic gold medalists
- List of multiple Olympic gold medalists at a single Games
- List of multiple Summer Olympic medalists
- List of select Jewish swimmers
- List of top Olympic gold medalists in swimming
- World record progression 100 metres butterfly
- World record progression 100 metres freestyle
- World record progression 200 metres butterfly
- World record progression 200 metres freestyle
- World record progression 400 metres freestyle
- World record progression 4 × 100 metres medley relay
- World record progression 4 × 200 metres freestyle relay

Records
| Preceded by Michael Wenden | Men's 100-meter freestyle world record-holder (long course); August 23, 1970 – June 21, 1975 | Succeeded by Jim Montgomery |
| Preceded by Don Schollander | Men's 200-meter freestyle world record-holder (long course); July 12, 1969 – August 23, 1974 | Succeeded by Tim Shaw |
| Preceded by Luis Nicolao | Men's 100-meter butterfly world record-holder (long course); July 31, 1967 – August 27, 1977; With: Doug Russell on August 29 and October 2, 1967 | Succeeded by Joe Bottom |
| Preceded by Kevin Berry; John Ferris; Gary Hall, Sr. Hans-Joachim Fassnacht | Men's 200-meter butterfly world record-holder (long course); July 26, 1967 – August 30, 1967; October 8, 1967 – August 22, 1970; August 27, 1971 – August 31, 1971; August 2, 1972 – June 3, 1976 | Succeeded by John Ferris; Gary Hall, Sr. Hans-Joachim Fassnacht; Roger Pyttel |
Olympic Games
| Preceded by Carl Osburn | Most career Olympic medals won by an American; 1972–2004 | Succeeded by Jenny Thompson |
| Preceded by Carl Osburn | Most career Olympic medals won by an American man 1972–2008 | Succeeded by Michael Phelps |
