= José Aranha =

Brazilian swimmer (born 1951)

Personal information
- Full name: José Roberto Diniz Aranha
- Born: 2 February 1951 (age 75) São Paulo, São Paulo, Brazil
- Height: 1.91 m (6 ft 3 in)
- Weight: 82 kg (181 lb)

Sport
- Sport: Swimming
- Strokes: Freestyle
Medal record
Men's swimming
Representing Brazil
Pan American Games
Silver medal – second place	1971 Cali	100m freestyle
Bronze medal – third place	1971 Cali	4x100m free
Bronze medal – third place	1971 Cali	4x100m medley
Bronze medal – third place	1971 Cali	4x200m free
Universiade
Bronze medal – third place	1973 Moscow	4x200m freestyle

José Roberto Diniz Aranha (born 2 February 1951 in São Paulo) is a former international freestyle swimmer from Brazil, who competed at two consecutive Summer Olympics for his native country, starting in 1968.

Between 1968 and 1972, he went to live and train in the United States.

At the 1967 Pan American Games, in Winnipeg, he swam the 400-metre freestyle, not reaching the finals.

At the 1968 Summer Olympics, in Mexico City, he swam the 100-metre freestyle and the 4×100-metre medley (along with José Fiolo, João Costa Lima Neto and César Filardi), not reaching the finals.

He was at the 1971 Pan American Games, in Cali, where he won a silver medal in the 100-metre freestyle, and three bronze medals in the three Brazilian relays (4×100-metre freestyle, 4×100-metre medley and 4×200-metre freestyle), breaking the South American record in all three relays.

At the 1972 Summer Olympics, in Munich, he finished 4th in the 4×100-metre freestyle (6 seconds and a half below the South American record), along Ruy de Oliveira, Paulo Zanetti and Paulo Becskehazy, and 5th in the 4×100-metre medley (improving in 5 seconds the South American record), along with Rômulo Arantes, José Fiolo and Sérgio Waismann. He also swam the 100-metre freestyle and the 4×200-metre freestyle, not reaching the finals. In the 4×100-metre medley, Aranha took the relay at 8th place and exceeded 3 countries, finishing in 5th. In the 4×100-metre freestyle, he came in 6th place and closed at 4th, a half second to win the bronze. Despite his great results in the relays, he never was the Brazilian record holder of the 100-metre freestyle.

At the 1973 Summer Universiade, in Moscow, Aranha won a bronze medal in the 4×200-metre freestyle, along with José Namorado, James Huxley Adams and Alfredo Machado.

Participated at the inaugural World Aquatics Championships in 1973 Belgrade, where he finished 5th in the 4×100-metre freestyle, along with Ruy de Oliveira, José Namorado and James Huxley Adams. He also swam the 4×200-metre freestyle, finishing 11th, with the same team.
