= Guillermo García (swimmer) =

Mexican swimmer (born 1955)

Personal information
- Full name: Guillermo García Castillo
- Nationality: Mexican
- Born: November 17, 1955 (age 70)
- Height: 1.80 m (5 ft 11 in)
- Weight: 72 kg (159 lb)

Sport
- Sport: Swimming
- Strokes: Freestyle
Medal record
Men's swimming
Representing Mexico
Pan American Games
Bronze medal – third place	1971 Cali	1500m freestyle
Bronze medal – third place	1975 Mexico City	4x100m freestyle

Guillermo García (born November 17, 1955) is a 2-time Olympic distance swimmer from Mexico. He swam for Mexico at the 1972 and 1976 Olympics.

He won the bronze medal in the Men's 1500m Freestyle at the 1971 Pan American Games, and was a finalist in the same event at the 1972 Olympics.
