= Jorge Urreta =

Mexican swimmer (born 1950)

Personal information
- Full name: Jorge Antonio Urreta Merino
- Born: 8 June 1950 (age 76) Mexico City, Mexico

Sport
- Sport: Swimming
- Strokes: Freestyle
Medal record
Men's swimming
Representing Mexico
Central American and Caribbean Games
Gold medal – first place	1970 Panama City	4×200 m freestyle

Jorge Antonio Urreta Merino (born 8 June 1950 in Mexico City) is a Mexican former freestyle swimmer who competed in the 1968 Summer Olympics and in the 1972 Summer Olympics.
