= Ruy de Oliveira =

Brazilian swimmer

Personal information
- Full name: Ruy Tadeu Aquino de Oliveira
- Born: 1 February 1953 (age 73) Brazil
- Height: 1.87 m (6 ft 2 in)
- Weight: 87 kg (192 lb)

Sport
- Sport: Swimming
- Strokes: Freestyle
Medal record
Men's swimming
Representing Brazil
Pan American Games
Bronze medal – third place	1971 Cali	4×100 m freestyle
Bronze medal – third place	1971 Cali	4×200 m freestyle

Ruy Tadeu Aquino de Oliveira (born 1 February 1953) is a former international freestyle swimmer from Brazil, who competed at one Summer Olympics for his native country.

He was at the 1971 Pan American Games, in Cali, where he won two bronze medals, in the 4×100-metre freestyle and in the 4×200-metre freestyle, both breaking the South American record. He also finished 7th in the 100-metre freestyle.

At the 1972 Summer Olympics, in Munich, he finished 4th in the 4×100-metre freestyle (6 seconds and a half below the South American record). He also swam the 100-metre freestyle, 200-metre freestyle and 4×200-metre freestyle, not reaching the finals.

Participated at the inaugural World Aquatics Championships in 1973 Belgrade, where he finished 5th in the 4×100-metre freestyle, along with José Aranha, José Namorado and James Huxley Adams; and 8th in the 100-metre freestyle. He also swam the 4×200-metre freestyle, finishing 11th, with the same team.

He was at the 1975 World Aquatics Championships in Cali. In the 4×100-metre medley, he finished 9th, with a time of 4:01.99, along with Rômulo Arantes, Heliani dos Santos and Sérgio Pinto Ribeiro. In the 100-metre freestyle, he finished 10th, with a time of 53.93 seconds.

He was the South American record holder of the 100-metre freestyle, between 1972 and 1980.
