= Brian Phillips (swimmer) =

Canadian swimmer (born 1954)

Personal information
- Full name: Brian Phillips
- National team: Canada
- Born: March 30, 1954 (age 72) Winnipeg, Manitoba
- Height: 1.89 m (6 ft 2 in)
- Weight: 80 kg (176 lb)

Sport
- Sport: Swimming
- Strokes: Freestyle
Medal record
Men's swimming
Representing Canada
World Championships
Bronze medal – third place	1973 Belgrade	4×100 m medley
Pan American Games
Silver medal – second place	1971 Cali	4x100 m freestyle
Silver medal – second place	1971 Cali	4x200 m freestyle
Commonwealth Games
Gold medal – first place	1974 Christchurch	4×100 m freestyle
Gold medal – first place	1974 Christchurch	4×200 m freestyle
Bronze medal – third place	1974 Christchurch	100 m freestyle

Brian Phillips (born March 30, 1954) is a Canadian former competitive swimmer who won four medals in major international championship events during the early 1970s. Phillips won a total of six medals in major international championships, including the FINA World Championships, Pan American Games and Commonwealth Games.

As a 17-year-old at the 1971 Pan American Games in Cali, Colombia, Phillips won silver medals as a member of the second-place Canadian teams in the 4x100-metre freestyle and 4x200-metre freestyle relay events. The following year, he represented Canada at the 1972 Summer Olympics in Munich, West Germany, where he competed in three events. He was again a member of the Canadian relay teams in the 4x100 and 4x200-metre freestyle relay events, finishing fifth and seventh, respectively, in the event finals.

In 1973, he won a bronze medal swimming for the Canadian team in the men's 4×100-metre medley relay at the 1973 World Aquatics Championships in Belgrade. In his final international appearance at the 1974 British Commonwealth Games in Christchurch, New Zealand, he won a gold medal in the 4×100-metre freestyle relay with teammates Bruce Robertson, Gary MacDonald and Ian MacKenzie, and another gold in the 4x100-metre medley relay with Robertson, Steve Pickell and William Mahony. Individually, he also won a bronze in the men's 100-metre freestyle.

== See also ==
- List of Commonwealth Games medallists in swimming (men)
