= Paulo Zanetti =

Brazilian swimmer (born 1952)

Personal information
- Full name: Paulo Zanetti
- Born: September 24, 1952 (age 73) Brazil
- Height: 1.84 m (6 ft 0 in)
- Weight: 80 kg (180 lb)

Sport
- Sport: Swimming
- Strokes: Freestyle
Medal record
Men's swimming
Representing Brazil
Pan American Games
Bronze medal – third place	1971 Cali	4x100m free

Paulo Zanetti (born September 24, 1952) is a former international freestyle swimmer from Brazil, who competed at one Summer Olympics for his native country.

He was at the 1971 Pan American Games, in Cali, where he won a bronze medal in the 4×100-metre freestyle, breaking the South American record.

At the 1972 Summer Olympics, in Munich, he finished 4th in the 4×100-metre freestyle (6 seconds and a half below the South American record). He also swam the 100-metre freestyle and the 4×200-metre freestyle, not reaching the finals.

He was at the 1975 World Aquatics Championships in Cali. In the 4×200-metre freestyle, he finished 12th, with a time of 8:07.41, along with Paul Jouanneau, Eduardo Alijó Neto and Paulo Mangini.

He was at the 1975 Pan American Games, in Mexico City, where he finished 6th in the 100-metre freestyle.
