= British Swimming Coaches Association =

The British Swimming Coaches Association (BSCA) is the national association for swimming coaches in the United Kingdom. It is a founding member of the International Federation of Swim Coaches Associations.

== Hall of Fame Olympic Coaches ==
- Barry Prime
- Bill Furniss OBE
- Charlie Wilson
- Dave Calleja
- David Haller
- David Heathcock
- Dave McNulty MBE
- Frank Thomas
- Hamilton Smith
- Ian Turner
- John Verrier
- Jon Rudd
- Keith Bewley
- Kevin Renshaw
- Malcolm Staight
- Melanie Marshall MBE
- Mike Higgs
- Paddy Garratt
- Rick Bailey
- Roger Eady
- Sean Kelly
- Terry Davies
- Terry Denison MBE

== History ==
The organisation was formed in September 1965, at the ASA championship in Blackpool. It held its first annual conference at Bedford College, London, in January 1966. Talks were given by Deryk Snelling and Bill Juba.

The association was for elite swimming, as it often discussed how to win medals at a national level.

Many swimming coaches in the UK have qualified through the ASA (Amateur Swimming Association, now Swim England), via the Coach Education Certification Course. Other parts of the UK are represented by Scottish Swimming, Swim Wales and Swim Ireland. The BSCA was incorporated as a company in January 2010.

=== Awards ===
From 1 May 1968 had sprint awards, with levels of Gold, Silver and Bronze, to encourage speed swimming, with set times over sixty six and two-thirds yards, for four disciplines.

The ASA had their parallel proficiency awards.

== Function ==
It represents swimming coaches in the UK. It holds an annual 2-day BSCA Conference each year in late September. It holds the annual BSCA Awards. It works with British Swimming (former Great Britain Swimming Federation), who govern the sport in Great Britain.

=== Annual conferences ===
- January 1966, London; it discussed the American hard-nosed results-led technique, and realised that unless the British took some leaves out of the American book, the Americans would win everything
- September 1966, Blackpool; the organisation now had 110, the ASA had decided to limit the national championships to British entrants only, from 1967; previously swimmers from Canada would compete in the ASA championships; whether to train at altitude for the 1968 Mexico Olympics, or not
- 1968, Bedford College, London; a heart consultant gave advice, and altitude training for the 1968 Summer Olympics; Mexico City was at 2,200 metres altitude
- 1974, University of Nottingham, with sessions at Bramcote swimming pool
- 5-6 January 1980, De Vere Hotel, Coventry; guest speaker was Frank Kiefe of the American Swimming Coaches Association
- 1986, Blackpool
- 1987, Leicester
- 1988, Holiday Inn and Adrian Boult Hall, Birmingham
- 1993, Cardiff
- 1996, Haydock

=== Coach of the Year ===
From 1979, each year at the conference, it awarded the Coach of the Year

- 1979 Terry Denison MBE
- 1980 Keith Bewley
- 1981 Terry Denison MBE
- 1982 Terry Denison MBE
- 1983
- 1984
- 1985
- 1986 Mike Higgs, of Southend
- 1987 Terry Denison MBE (6th time)
- 1988 Terry Denison MBE (7th time)
- 1989 Terry Denison MBE
- 1990
- 1991
- 1992 Barry Prime, of City of Birmingham
- 1993 Barry Prime
- 1994
- 1995
- 1996 Dave Calleja
- 1997
- 1998
- 1999
- 2000
- 2001
- 2002
- 2003
- 2004
- 2005
- 2006
- 2007
- 2008
- 2009
- 2010 Patrick Miley
- 2011
- 2012
- 2013 Jon Rudd
- 2014 Melanie Marshall MBE
- 2015 Melanie Marshall MBE
- 2016 Melanie Marshall MBE
- 2017
- 2018
- 2019 Steven Tigg
- 2020 No Award
- 2021 Dave McNulty MBE
- 2022
- 2023 Dave McNulty MBE
- 2024 Andi Manley
- 2025 Lisa Bates

=== British Male Swimmer of the Year ===
- 1986 Andy Jameson, aged 20
- 1992 Nick Gillingham, aged 24
- 1993 Nick Gillingham
- 1996 Paul Palmer (swimmer), of Lincoln Pentaqua

=== British Female Swimmer of the Year ===
- 1985 Sarah Hardcastle
- 1986 Sarah Hardcastle
- 1988 Suki Brownsdon, aged 22
- 1989 Margaret Hohmann, aged 32
- 1991 Joanne Deakins, aged 18, in the sixth form of Evesham High School
- 1992 Joanne Deakins
- 1999 Sue Rolph

=== Publications ===
- Swimming Coach

== Structure ==
The organisation is headquartered in Worcestershire. It is represented on the International Council for Coaching Excellence and the World Swimming Coaches Association.

=== Presidents ===
- 1971 Harry Braund, of Birmingham
- 1972 Harry Braund
- 1977 Alan Hime
- 1985 Laurie Dormer

== See also ==
- American Swimming Coaches Association
