= Sport in the United Kingdom =

Sport in the United Kingdom plays an important role in British culture and the United Kingdom has played a significant role in the organisation and spread of sporting culture globally. In the infancy of many organised sports, the Home Nations (England, Scotland, Wales, and Ireland) were heavily involved in setting out the formal rules of many sports and formed among the earliest separate governing bodies, national teams and domestic league competitions. After Partition of Ireland in 1922, some sports formed separate bodies for Northern Ireland, though many continued to be organised on an all-Ireland basis. For this reason, in many though not all sports, most domestic and international sport is carried on a Home Nations basis, and England, Wales, Scotland and Ireland (or Northern Ireland) are recognised as national entities. This is in contrast to the majority of other states that participate in international sports which field a single national team to represent the entire polity.

In a small number of sports, these teams are supplemented by high-profile events, featuring a combined team representing one or more Home nations. The most notable examples of such arrangements are the British and Irish Lions in rugby union (and formerly the British Lions in rugby league), the Walker Cup golf team and Great Britain at the Olympics in relation to Olympic sports ordinarily organised on a Home Nations basis.

In other sports, especially individual Olympic sports such as athletics, swimming, cycling and triathlon, or those team sports invented outside the United Kingdom (e.g. basketball, baseball, ice hockey, lacrosse and volleyball), the United Kingdom generally participates as one nation, usually under the name Great Britain or, more rarely, as Great Britain and Northern Ireland; the latter is the official name of the United Kingdom's team at the Olympic Games, though it is commonly referred to, not uncontroversially, as the former - the trademarked brand name for the team of the British Olympic Association is "Team GB". Teams rarely, if ever, compete under the designation 'United Kingdom', reflected in the standard abbreviations GB and GBR. Before the founding of the Irish Free State, the name of the Olympic team was commonly given as Great Britain and Ireland with a standard abbreviation or Olympic code of either GBR or BRI.

Overall, association football attracts the most viewers and money, though the nation is notable for the diversity of its sporting interests, especially at the elite level. Great Britain has a special affinity with both Olympic Sport as the only nation to win at least one gold medal at every Summer Games, and with Paralympic Sport as the birthplace of the modern Paralympic movement in Stoke Mandeville Hospital in 1948. The capital London was the first city to host three Summer Olympic Games, and the United Kingdom has twice hosted the Paralympic Games, in London in 2012 and in Stoke Mandeville in 1984.

Major individual sports include athletics, cycling, golf, motorsport, and horse racing. The United Kingdom hosts significant major events across many sports annually, which see a seasonal uptick of interest in that sport for the duration of the event, including one of the four 'major' or 'grand slam' events in both tennis and men's golf. Tennis is the highest profile sport for the two weeks of the Wimbledon Championships. Snooker and darts, too, enjoy period profile boosts in line with the holding of their largest events, both of which are based permanently in England. The Boat Race in rowing, the All England Open Badminton Championships, Badminton and Burghley Horse Trials in three-day eventing, the London Marathon enjoy similar global renown within their fields, and peak interest for short periods nationally. The Open Championship in golf also peaks periodic interest domestically as the only non-US and oldest Major, but golf maintains a reasonably high-profile throughout the year and is a significant social sport.

Many other sports are also played and followed to a lesser degree. There is much debate over which sport has the most active participants with swimming, athletics, and cycling all found to have wider active participation than association football in the 2010 Sport England Active People Survey. The United Kingdom is widely considered one of the top performing sporting nations in the world.

== History ==
=== 17th century ===
Writing about, has explained the role of Puritan power, the English Civil War, and the Restoration of the monarchy in England. The Long Parliament in 1642 "banned theaters, which had met with Puritan disapproval. Although similar action would be taken against certain sports, it is not clear if cricket was in any way prohibited, except that players must not break the Sabbath". In 1660, "the Restoration of the monarchy in England was immediately followed by the reopening of the theaters, and so any sanctions that had been imposed by the Puritans on cricket would also have been lifted." He goes on to make the key point that political, social, and economic conditions in the aftermath of the Restoration encouraged excessive gambling, so much so, that a Gambling Act was deemed necessary in 1664. It is certain that cricket, horse racing, and boxing (i.e., prizefighting) were financed by gambling interests. Leech explains that it was the habit of cricket patrons, all of whom were gamblers, to form strong teams through the 18th century to represent their interests. He defines a strong team as one representative of more than one parish, and he is certain that such teams were first assembled in or immediately after 1660.

Prior to the English Civil War and the Commonwealth, all available evidence concludes that cricket had evolved to the level of village cricket, where only teams that are strictly representative of individual parishes compete. The "strong teams" of the post-Restoration mark the evolution of cricket (and, indeed of professional team sport, for cricket is the oldest professional team sport) from the parish standard to the county standard. This was the point of origin for major, or first-class, cricket. The year 1660 also marks the origin of professional team sports.

=== Cricket ===
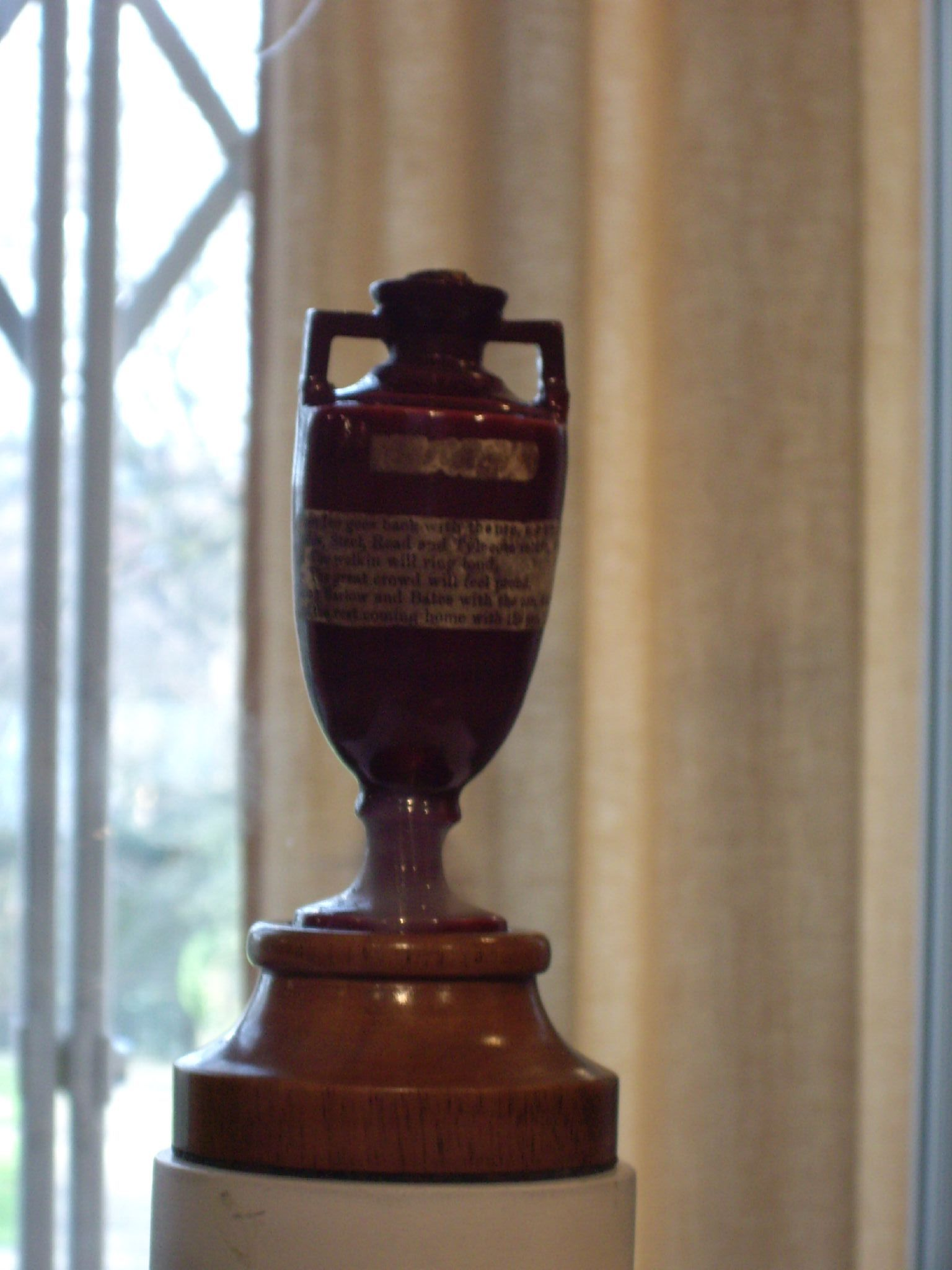
The Ashes urn, competed for between Australia and England in cricket

Cricket had become well-established among the English upper class in the 18th century, and was a major factor in sports competition among the public schools. Army units around the Empire had time on their hands, and encouraged the locals to learn cricket so they could have some entertaining competition. Most of the Empire embraced cricket, with the exception of Canada. Cricket test matches (international) began by the 1870s; the first and most famous rivalry is that between Australia and England for "The Ashes."

=== Public schools ===
A number of the public schools such as Winchester and Eton, introduced variants of football and other sports for their pupils. These were described at the time as "innocent and lawful", certainly in comparison with the rougher rural games. With urbanisation in the 19th century, the rural games moved to the new urban centres and came under the influence of the middle and upper classes. The rules and regulations devised at English institutions began to be applied to the wider game, with governing bodies in England being set up for a number of sports by the end of the 19th century. The rising influence of the upper class also produced an emphasis on the amateur, and the spirit of "fair play". The industrial revolution also brought with it increasing mobility, and created the opportunity for universities in Britain and elsewhere to compete with one another. This sparked increasing attempts to unify and reconcile various games in England, leading to the establishment of the Football Association in London, the first official governing body in football.

For sports to become professionalised, coaching had to come first. It gradually professionalised in the Victorian era and the role was well established by 1914. In the First World War, military units sought out the coaches to supervise physical conditioning and develop morale-building teams.

=== Ireland ===
Following the partition of Ireland in 1922, some sports organisations created separate governing bodies for Northern Ireland, while others, including most of the larger and more prominent team sports such as rugby union, cricket and hockey, continued to operate on an all-Ireland basis. In soccer, uniquely, the teams from the new Irish Free State instigated the new organisation (now the Football Association of Ireland) as the original Irish Football Association was based in and seen to be heavily influenced by, Belfast-based teams.

=== Sports culture ===
British Prime Minister John Major was the political leader most closely identified with promotion of sports. In 1995 he argued:

"We invented the majority of the world's great sports.... 19th century Britain was the cradle of a leisure revolution every bit as significant as the agricultural and industrial revolutions we launched in the century before."

The British showed a more profound interest in sports, and in greater variety, than any rival. This was chiefly due to the development of the railway network in the UK before other nations. Allowing for national newspapers, and travel around the country far earlier than in other places. They gave pride of place to such moral issues as sportsmanship and fair play.

Cricket became symbolic of the Imperial spirit throughout the Empire. Football proved highly attractive to the urban working classes, which introduced the rowdy spectator to the sports world. In some sports, there was significant controversy in the fight for amateur purity especially in rugby and rowing. New games became popular almost overnight, including lawn tennis, cycling and hockey. Women were much more likely to enter these sports than the old established ones. The aristocracy and landed gentry, with their ironclad control over land rights, dominated hunting, shooting, fishing and horse racing.

Many modern Olympic sports trace their roots back to Britain, including sports that are not commonly considered particularly British sports today, such as table tennis and bobsleigh.

== Administration and funding ==
Political responsibility for sport is a devolved matter. As England has no parliament of its own, the United Kingdom Department of Culture, Media and Sport which is headed by a cabinet minister -though the Minister for Sport and Tourism is not in the cabinet- deals with English sport in addition to United Kingdom-wide sports.

Political responsibility for sport in Scotland lies with the Scottish government Minister for Sport and Health Improvement, currently Jamie Hepburn, though is part of the remit of the Cabinet secretary for Health, Wellbeing and Sport, currently Shona Robison.

Political responsibility for sport in Wales lies with the Welsh Minister for Health, Wellbeing and Sport, currently Vaughan Gething. The minister sets out the strategic policy objectives for Sport Wales, which is responsible for the development and promotion of sport and active lifestyles in Wales. Sport Wales work closely with the Governing bodies of sports in Wales to whom they distribute government and National Lottery funding, through grants and awards.

Political responsibility for sport in Northern Ireland lies with the Department for Communities, under Minister for Communities Carál Ní Chuilín. Sport NI is administered by the Department for Communities, and is engaged in the development and funding of sporting activity.

Local government also contributes to the commissioning and funding of sport. The Local Government Association makes reference to "the contribution of culture and sport ... to wider community services" and "the outcomes for individuals and communities" which local government seeks to secure.

The Sport and Recreation Alliance is the representative body for sports organisations in the United Kingdom, including federations, players associations, managers associations and regional organisations.

A large majority of the funding for elite sport in the United Kingdom is commercially generated, but this is concentrated heavily on a few sports. For example, the English Premier League's 20 clubs had an estimated combined turnover of £1.25 billion in 2003–04 according to Deloitte, and British professional football's total income was in the region of £2 billion. Other major sports have a turnover in low nine figures or the tens of millions of pounds. For example, cricket is highly dependent on its TV contract, which was worth £55 million a year for the 2006–09 seasons.

Athletics, and also most sports outside the top ten or so in popularity, are heavily dependent on public funding. The government agency which funnels this is UK Sport, which has affiliates in each of the home nations, for example Sport England. These agencies are also responsible for distributing money raised for sport by the National Lottery. In 2005, when it was announced London would host the 2012 Games, UK Sport announced funding plans which were more focused than ever before on rewarding sports which have delivered Olympic success, and as a corollary, penalising those which have not. UK Sport also provides money for the recreational side of the main team sports, even football.

Other sports benefit from special financial provision. British tennis is subsidised by the profits of the Wimbledon Championships, which are in the tens of millions of pounds each year. Horse racing benefits from a levy on betting.

== Popularity ==
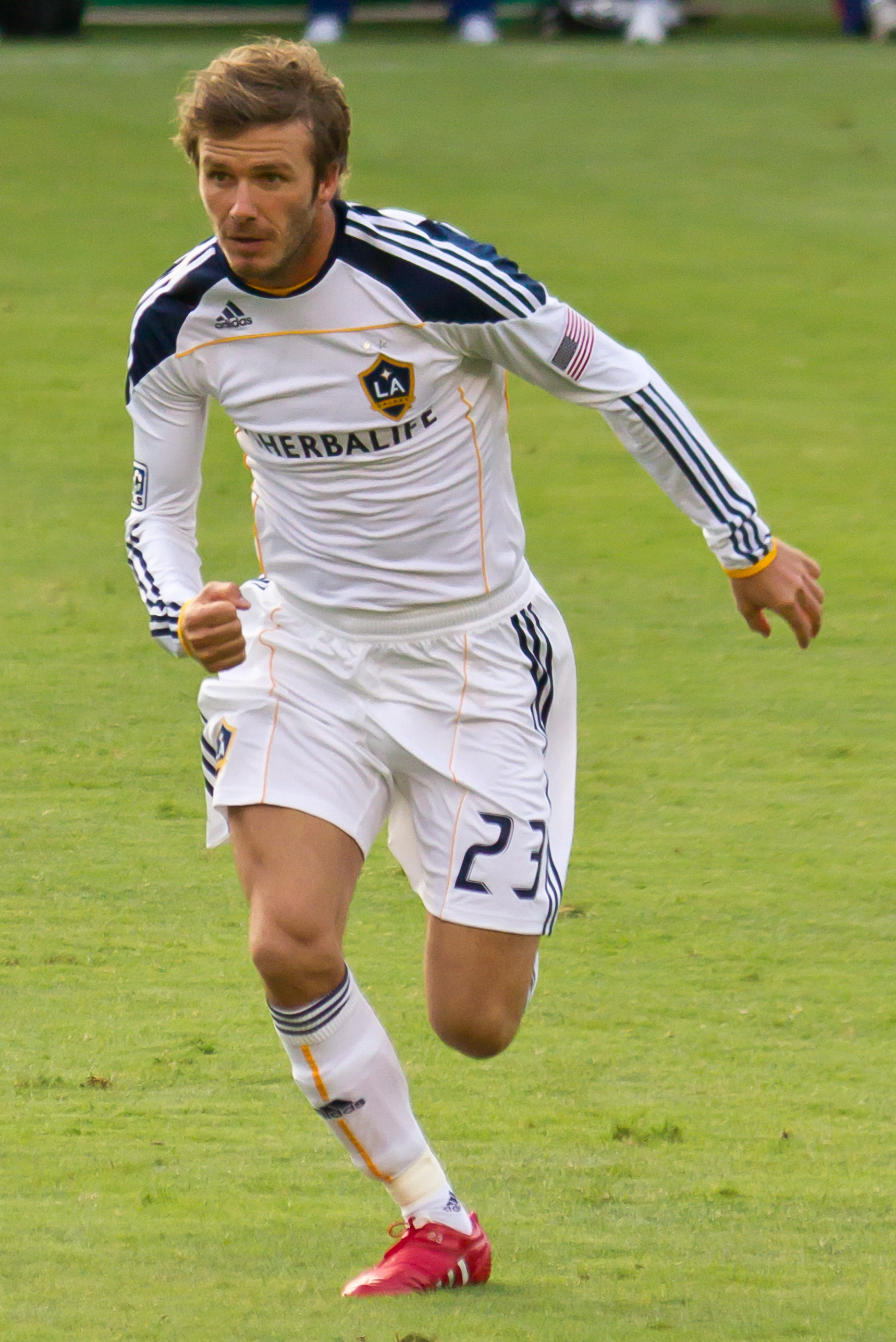
Association footballer David Beckham

A 2003 MORI poll found:

Sport	TV Viewing	Participating	Interested In
Football	46%	10%	45%
Rugby union	21%	6%	27%
Tennis	18%	3%	23%
Cricket	18%	2%	19%
Athletics	18%	2%	21%
Snooker	17%	5%	24%
Motor racing	16%	NA	20%
Rugby league	12%	NA	15%
Boxing	11%	NA	14%
Darts	9%	3%	NA
Swimming	NA	9%	NA
Gymnastics	NA	12%	17%
Badminton	NA	3%	NA
Squash	NA	3%	NA
Watersport	NA	2%	NA
Skiing	NA	1%	NA
Lawn bowls	NA	1%	NA

In September 2023, YouGov asked respondents which sports they followed, either on television, in person or by supporting a team, and which they had played in the previous 12 months. They could choose more than one sport.

Sport	Followed	Played
Football	38%	10%
Rugby	17%	2%
Tennis	17%	4%
Cricket	15%	2%
Other	11%	7%
Boxing	7%	2%
Horse racing	6%	1%
Golf	5%	5%
Basketball	2%	2%
Hockey	1%	1%
None of the above	41%	77%

== Sports media ==
The British media is dominated by United Kingdom-wide outlets, with local media playing a much smaller role. Traditionally, the BBC played a dominant role in televising sport, providing extensive high-quality advertisement, free coverage, and free publicity, in exchange for being granted broadcast rights for low fees. ITV broadcast a smaller portfolio of events. In the early 1990s, this arrangement was shaken up by the arrival of pay-TV. BSkyB based its early marketing largely on its acquisition of top division English league football, which was renamed The Premiership as part of the deal. It has subsequently acquired many more top rights in other sports. However, Sky tends to focus on competitions which can fill its specialist sports channels on a regular basis, and many events are still shown on free to air television, especially annual and quadrennial events, such as Wimbledon and the Olympics which are wholly or partially protected for free-to-air broadcast by legislation; such events are commonly referred to in the media as listed events or Crown Jewel events, and often have a particular position within national culture. Scotland, Wales, and Northern Ireland each have their own feeds for BBC1 and BBC2, allowing the BBC to opt out of the United Kingdom-wide programming to show a match in that area. This is often used when all four nations have an International football match on the same evening, but can also be used to show minority interest sports in the country where they are most appreciated (for example BBC One Scotland may show the shinty cup final, while BBC One Wales shows a rugby union match, e.g. a URC match between two Welsh sides). In Scotland, the BBC also operates BBC Alba, a Gaelic-language channel which often broadcasts Scottish sports fixtures, benefiting from the generally lower fees required for minority language broadcasting rights. S4C enjoys the same role in Welsh-language television, and TG4, an Irish language station from the Republic of Ireland but widely available in Northern Ireland by agreement performs a similar role.

In 2006, the Irish company Setanta Sports made a major move into the British market by paying £392 million for rights to certain Scottish Premier League, as well as one third of live Premier League matches for the three-year period from summer 2007 to summer 2010.

Radio sports coverage is also important. BBC Radio 5 Live broadcasts almost all major sports events. It now has a commercial rival called Talksport, but this has not acquired anywhere near as many exclusive contracts as Sky Sports. BBC Local Radio also provides extensive coverage of sport, giving more exposure to second-tier clubs which get limited national coverage.

The United Kingdom does not have an extant tradition of sports newspapers in the mould of L'Equipe, Gazetta dello Sport and Marca – although publications such as Bell's Life in London, The Sporting Times and The Sportsman, all featuring a particular emphasis on horse racing, were popular during the 19th century and into the early 20th century, whilst Sporting Life and the Sports Argus continued publication until the 1990s and 2000s, and live on as a website and a supplement to the Birmingham Mail respectively. All of the national newspapers except the Financial Times devote many pages to sport every day. Local newspapers cover local clubs at all levels, and there are hundreds of weekly and monthly sports magazines.

== By sport ==
=== Team sports ===
Four sports in the United Kingdom operate high-profile professional leagues. Association football is the most popular sport and is played from August to May, headed by the Premier League in England, and the Scottish Premiership in Scotland. Rugby league is traditionally a winter sport, but since the late 1990s the elite competition, Super League has been played in the summer to minimise competition for attention with football. Rugby union is also a winter sport, with Premiership Rugby in England, and the United Rugby Championship in Scotland, Wales and Ireland being two of the three dominant leagues in the Northern Hemisphere. Cricket is played in the Summer, from April to September in a variety of formats by professional county teams under the auspices of the England and Wales Cricket Board, while in Ireland, Northern Knights and North West Warriors both from Northern Ireland play first-class cricket across various Inter-Provincial competitions

There are also a number of semi-professional leagues with a national footprint and some level of national media coverage; Ice Hockey operate a league in the United Kingdom called the Elite Ice Hockey League, with at least one team in each of the four constituent countries. Both men's and women's basketball leagues, the British Basketball League and Women's British Basketball League operate on a professional basis in England and Scotland, as does the premier netball competition the Netball Superleague in England, Scotland and Wales. All these leagues have small but significant domestic television and media presence.

In Northern Ireland, as in the rest of Ireland, gaelic games, specifically Gaelic football and hurling, enjoy significant support from the nationalist community, although the players are mostly amateur. Despite the amateur status, major games involving county teams from Northern Ireland draw attendances comparable with both rugby codes, and in the later stages of the All-Ireland Senior Football Championship comparable with the largest Premier League teams. In Northern Ireland, outside Antrim and the Ards peninsula, Gaelic football is the dominant GAA sport.

==== Association football ====
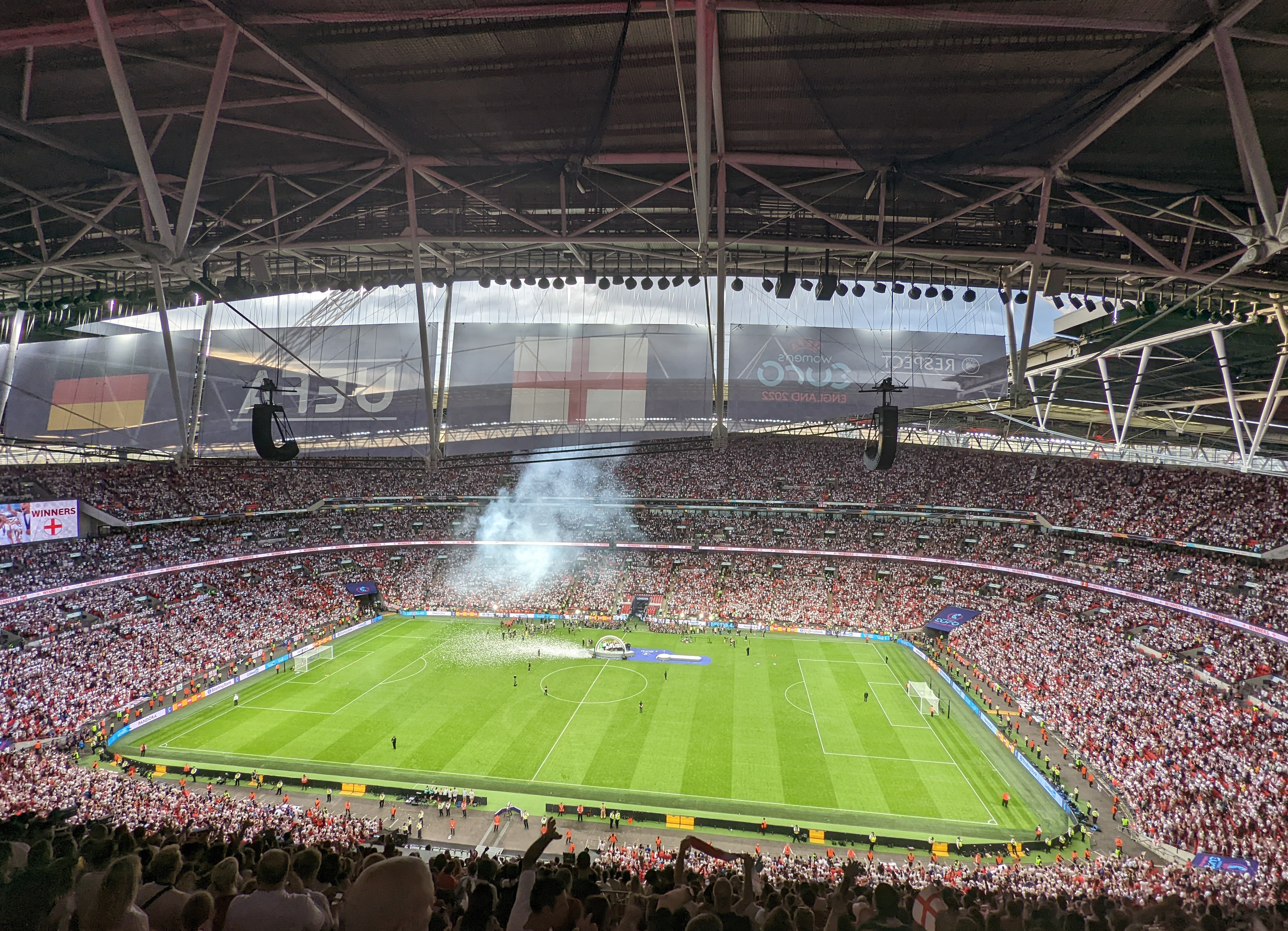
Wembley Stadium, London, home of the England football team and FA Cup finals, during the UEFA Women's Euro 2022 crowning of England

The modern global game of football evolved out of traditional football games played in England in the 19th century and today is the highest profile sport in the United Kingdom by a very wide margin. This has been the case for generations, but the gap is widely perceived to have increased since the early 1990s, and football's dominance is often seen as a threat to other sports. Each of the four countries in the UK put together its own football leagues for both men and women; there are however a few teams who play in another country.

The only major men's national team competition won by a Home Nation is the 1966 World Cup, which England hosted and won, though clubs in both the Scottish and English domestic leagues have had success in European club competitions, most notably the UEFA Champions League or its predecessor the European Cup. Glasgow's Celtic won the 1966–67 European Cup, becoming the first British team to do so, with a team composed entirely of players born and raised within the local area around the club's stadium, while the following year, Manchester United became the first English club to win the competition, 10 years after the team had been the victim of a notorious air disaster in Munich while playing in the same competition. Liverpool, with six wins, is the most successful English, and British, team in European football, while the competition has also been won by Manchester United three times in total, Nottingham Forest and Chelsea from London twice each, and Aston Villa from Birmingham and Manchester City once each.

The only major women's national team competitions won by a Home Nation are the 2022 and 2025 Euros, both won by England. Arsenal, which now shares ownership with the men's club of the same name, has won the UEFA Women's Champions League twice, in 2007 and 2025.

The Scottish football league system includes Scottish Premiership, played between twelve teams. Two English clubs, Berwick Rangers and Tweedmouth Rangers, both based in Berwick-upon-Tweed in England, play in lower Scottish divisions.

The Welsh football league system includes Cymru Premier (historically the Welsh Premier League) and regional leagues. These leagues have a relatively low profile as rugby union is the national sport of Wales and the top four Welsh football clubs, Cardiff City, Newport County, Swansea City and Wrexham, play in the English Football League. One more Welsh club plays in the English football league system: Merthyr Town (a reformed version of the liquidated Merthyr Tydfil) in the seventh tier. In addition, one Cymru Premier club, The New Saints, play their home matches on the English side of the border in Oswestry. The main Welsh Cup competitions are the Welsh Cup and the FAW Premier Cup. Cardiff's 76,250 seater Millennium Stadium is the principal sporting stadium of Wales.

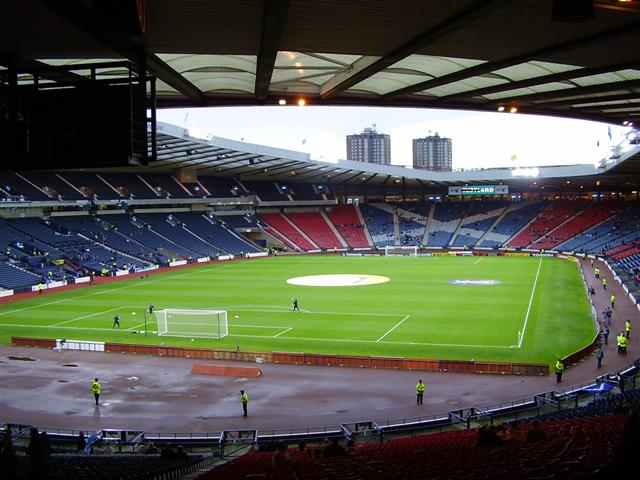
Hampden Park, Glasgow—Scotland's national football stadium

The Northern Ireland football league system includes the NIFL Premiership, often known colloquially as the "Irish League". One Northern Irish club, Derry City, plays its football outside of the United Kingdom in the Republic of Ireland football league system. Windsor Park, Linfield F.C.'s 20,332-seater stadium, is also the home stadium of the national team.

Each season the most successful clubs from each of the home nations qualify for the four Europe-wide club competitions organised by UEFA—the UEFA Champions League (formerly the European Cup), the UEFA Europa League (formerly the UEFA Cup) and, starting with the 2021–22 season, the UEFA Europa Conference League for men, as well as the UEFA Women's Champions League. England has produced at least one winner of each UEFA club competition, and Scotland has produced a winner of the men's Champions League. Linfield of Belfast's run to the 1966–67 European Cup quarter-final is the furthest any Northern Irish or Welsh team has reach in the premier European men's competition. Historically Welsh men's clubs were able to qualify for the now-defunct UEFA Cup Winners' Cup by winning the Welsh Cup: a number of Welsh teams enjoyed runs into the latter stages of the competition, with Cardiff City going furthest by reaching the semi-finals of the tournament in 1967–68.

For 100 years until 1984, England, Scotland, Wales and Northern Ireland competed annually in the British Home Championship but these ended for a variety of reasons. 2011 saw the inaugural Nations cup, in many ways a reboot of the old tournament. When the idea was first proposed to bring back the competition, the English FA had reservations, and so it was contested by the other three home nations and the Republic of Ireland, who were the first host nation and winners. The tournament was intended to be played biennially to prevent fixture congestion during World Cup qualification years with the 2013 event to be held at the Millennium stadium in Cardiff, the tournament was cancelled after the first year as very few fans were prepared to travel and the tournament did not create the expected revenues. Scotland and Wales were drawn against each other in World Cup qualification anyway, and a 150th anniversary friendly was organised between Scotland and England to celebrate the anniversary of the formation of the English F.A.

No United Kingdom national team has regularly been formed for football events in the Olympics. Proposals to have the United Kingdom (designated by the IOC as Great Britain) take part in the 2012 Summer Olympics with men's and women's teams were not supported by the Scottish, Welsh and Northern Irish football associations. The three bodies feared that Great Britain teams would undermine their independent status—a fear confirmed by FIFA president Sepp Blatter. Nevertheless, Great Britain entered teams in both 2012 tournaments as host. Following the 2016 Olympic Games, the Home Nations agreed to allow Great Britain to attempt to qualify a women's team in 2020, with England's results, as the highest-seeded of the Home Nations, treated as qualification results for Great Britain, but with Scottish and Welsh players allowed to join the Great Britain squad, technically representing the British Olympic Committee, not the English Football Association, in the event of qualification. England succeeded in qualifying for the 2020 Games and the arrangement, which echoes similar arrangements in rugby sevens and hockey, continues through the 2024 Summer Olympics for the women's team. no such arrangement is in place for the men's team. England has been the most successful of the home nations, winning the World Cup on home soil in 1966, although there has historically been a close-fought rivalry between England and Scotland.

==== Rugby football ====
Like association football, rugby union and rugby league both developed from traditional British football games in the 19th century. Rugby football was codified in 1871. Dissatisfaction with the governance of the sport led, in 1895, to a number of prominent clubs establishing what would become rugby league. The estranged clubs, based in mainly working class industrial regions of northern England, had wished to be allowed to compensate their players for missing work to play matches but they had been opposed by those clubs that were predominantly middle class and often based in the south of the country. Subsequently, rugby league developed somewhat different rules. For much of the 20th century there was considerable antagonism towards rugby league from rugby union. One Member of Parliament described it as "one of the longest (and daftest) grievances in history" with anyone over the age of 18 associated with rugby league being banned forever from rugby union. This antagonism has abated since 1995 when rugby union's international governing body, now known as World Rugby, "opened" rugby union to professionalism.

===== Rugby union =====
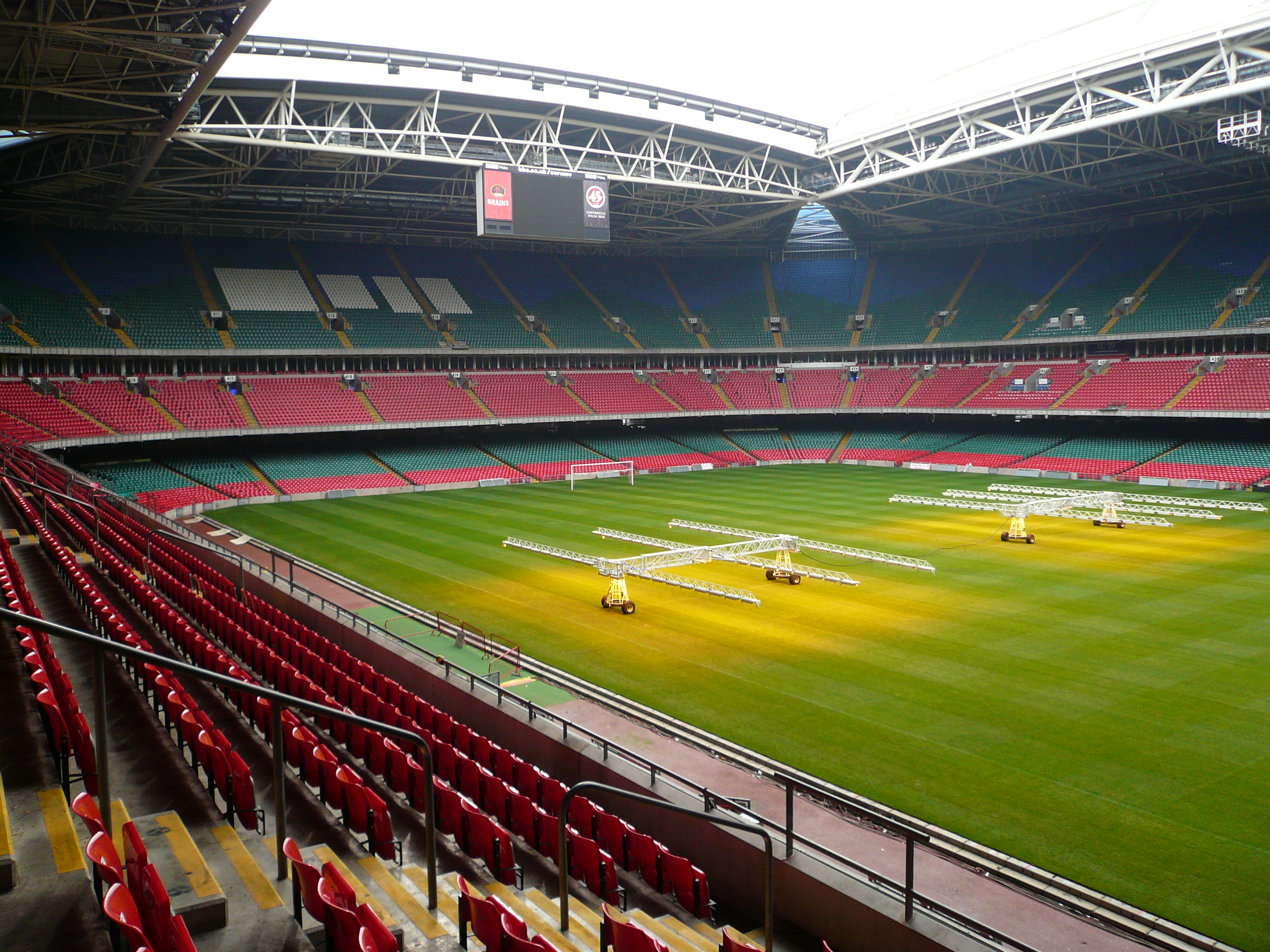
Cardiff's Millennium Stadium opened for the 1999 Rugby World Cup.

England, Scotland, Wales and Ireland (Northern and The Republic combined) all field separate teams and are collectively known as the Home Nations. All four teams are among the top ten in global rugby union. The Six Nations Championship played between the Home Nations, Italy and France is the premier international tournament in the northern hemisphere. The Triple Crown is awarded to any of the Home Nations who beats the other three in that tournament. Games are also often played against the "Southern Hemisphere" quartet of South Africa, Australia, New Zealand, and Argentina—as well as other rugby playing countries. England won the 2003 Rugby World Cup, the first victory in the competition by a British team (or, for that matter, any Northern Hemisphere country), and were runners-up to Australia in 1991 and South Africa in both 2007 and 2019 (the latter of which came after a convincing win against the All-Blacks in England's semi-final). In 1987, Wales achieved a best of third place and in 1991, Scotland a best of fourth place. Ireland has not progressed beyond the quarter finals. England (1991) and Wales (1999) have both hosted the Rugby World Cup in conjunction with the other Home Nations. In 2015, England hosted the Rugby World Cup; however, some games were played in Wales.

In the 2011 Rugby World Cup Wales was the only home nation to progress beyond the quarter-finals.

Rugby union has a number of heartlands, notably South Wales, the Scottish Borders, the English West Country, London and the Midlands. Rugby union is generally regarded as the national sport of Wales. England organises its own national league in Premiership Rugby, which launched the Premiership Rugby Cup in 2018–19 to replace the former Anglo-Welsh Cup, which had begun as an England-only competition but included Welsh teams from 2005 until its demise in 2018. The other Home Nations now have a single professional league, currently known as the United Rugby Championship, that also includes teams from Italy and South Africa. Attendances at club rugby in England have risen strongly since the sport went professional; by contrast, the professional era has had a traumatic effect on the traditional structure of club rugby in Wales and Scotland, although the long established provincial structure in Ireland rebounded relatively successfully, and attendances (and successes) there in domestic and European competition, including the team based in Northern Ireland, Ulster Rugby, are comparable to the larger English clubs. Following the regional model of Wales and Ireland, Scotland also originally established four regional teams for North, East, South and West Scotland. Due to the demographics of the country, the Northern region was too vast for a single club to serve (over twice the size of Wales but with only a quarter the population) and the 5% of the population who happened to live in the rugby-loving borders were not enough to sustain the Southern franchise, leaving just West and East. There was some talk of the regions being redrawn, with the North being divided in two and the South being absorbed into the West and East regions, but two Italian sides instead took the vacated places, and still later the competition added South African sides, with two joining in 2017 and eventually being replaced by four different sides in 2021.

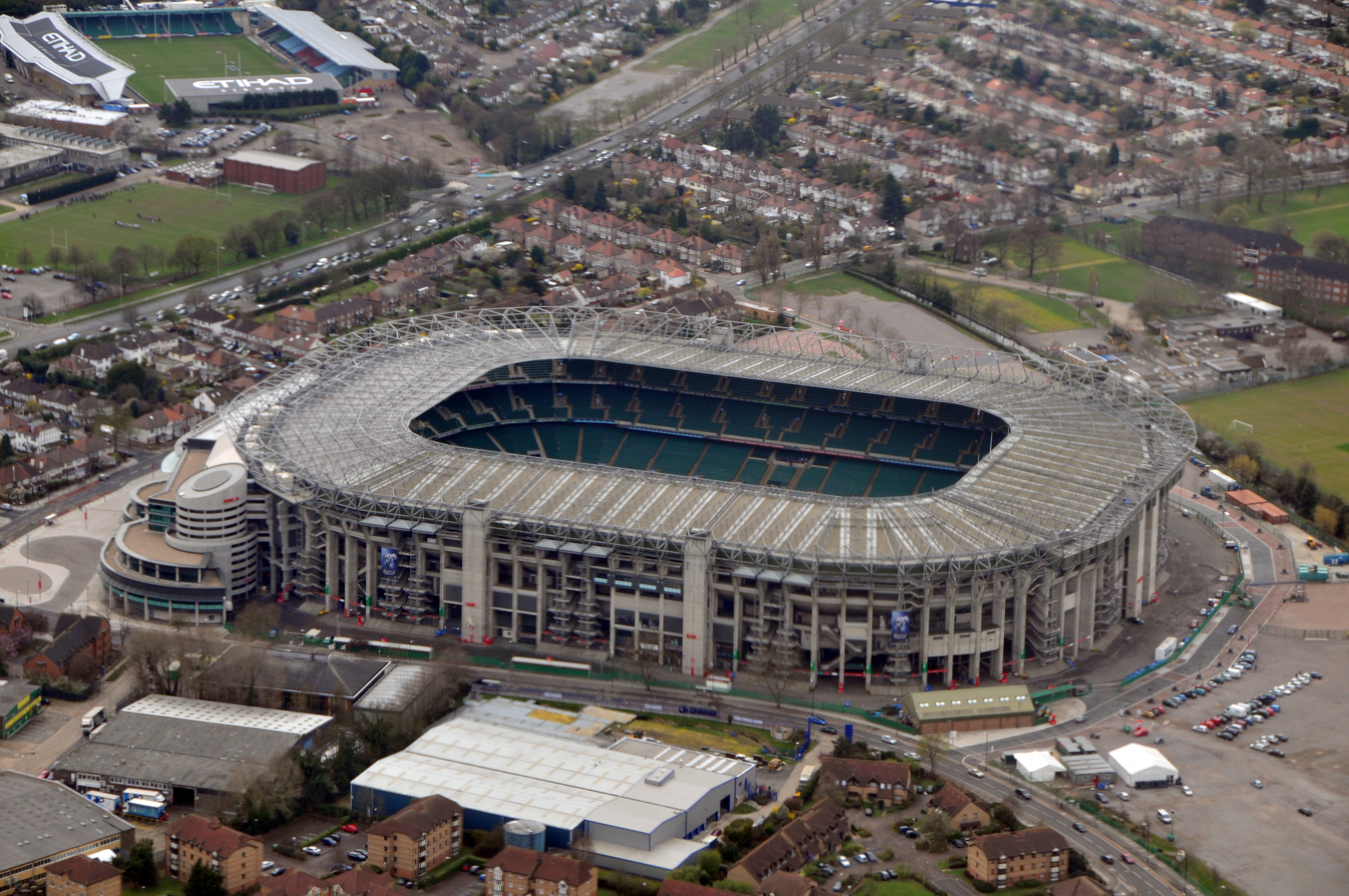
Aerial view of Twickenham Stadium

All of the home nations play in large, state-of-the-art venues. Twickenham in London, home to the England national team and the country's governing body, the Rugby Football Union, currently seats 82,000, making it the second-largest stadium in the country after Wembley. Wales and its governing body, the Welsh Rugby Union, make their home at Millennium Stadium, which is owned by the WRU. Scotland's largest stadium, with a capacity of over 67,000, is Murrayfield in Edinburgh, home to the national team and the Scottish Rugby Union. Ireland currently play all their home matches in the Republic's capital of Dublin at Aviva Stadium, a 55,000-seat stadium for football and rugby union built on the site of Irish rugby's historic home of Lansdowne Road. During the construction of the Aviva in the 2000s, Ireland played many home games in the 80,000 seat national GAA stadium, Croke Park.

As the sport's worldwide governing body, World Rugby, is based in Dublin and is heavily dominated by the Home Nations, there has never been a threat to the independence of each country's team and a joint team, known as the British and Irish Lions, will tour a Southern Hemisphere nation every four years. The Lions games however do not compete in any major tournaments, and will play local clubs as well as the host nation's First XV.

The four home nations also field national sevens teams. England, Scotland and Wales are all "core teams" that compete in all events of the annual World Rugby Sevens Series for men, and England have been a core team in the World Rugby Women's Sevens Series since the latter competition's creation in 2012. Ireland have not been as competitive in men's sevens, but the women's sevens team have had core status alongside England on two different occasions—first for the 2013–14 series, and most recently since the 2015–16 series. The United Kingdom currently hosts an event in each (men's) World Sevens Series in London; the UK had also hosted a second event in Scotland, but that event was removed from the schedule after the 2014–15 series. The 2014–15 women's series saw the debut of a London event, but that tournament did not return in any subsequent series. Rugby union returned to the Olympics in 2016 with sevens tournaments for both men and women; the Great Britain men's team won the silver medal, losing to Fiji in the final, and the women's team lost in the bronze medal match to Canada. In a contrast with football, the participation of Great Britain sevens teams at the Olympics was endorsed by World Rugby (then known as the International Rugby Board) in 2011. In the Rugby World Cup Sevens, the men's teams of England and Wales have both been victorious—England in the inaugural tournament in 1993 and Wales in 2009.

===== Rugby league =====
England, Scotland, Wales and Ireland all field separate teams Rugby league sides. Rugby league draws healthy crowds in its heartlands in Yorkshire and North West England, and is popular with armchair sports fans nationwide. The top-level league is Super League, which expanded to 14 teams for the 2009 season, but was reduced to 12 teams with the end of licensing and a reorganisation of the professional leagues in 2015. In 2020, the number of teams was further reduced to 11 in the wake of the COVID-19 pandemic; the one Canadian side in the league, Toronto Wolfpack, withdrew (at least temporarily) from the league due to pandemic-related financial challenges and travel restrictions. The Wolfpack had been the first team from outside Europe to play in the English system, having won the League 1 title and automatic promotion to the championship in their inaugural 2017 season and earning promotion to Super League in 2019. As of the current 2020 season, 10 of the teams are in the heartlands, with French side Catalans Dragons being the exception. Before the 2015 reorganisation, London Broncos competed in Super League. Below this level are the Championship and League 1 (historically the National Leagues); French side Toulouse Olympique competed in the championship from 2009 through to 2011, returned to British rugby league in 2016 in League 1, and were promoted to the championship for 2017. The 2020 Championship, abandoned after five rounds due to COVID-19, involved 14 teams, with 12 from the heartlands, London Broncos and Toulouse Olympique. The 2020 League 1, abandoned after two rounds due to COVID-19, involved 11 teams (down from 16 in the 2017 season), with six from the heartlands, three scattered through the remainder of England, and two from Wales. Until 2008, automatic promotion and relegation existed between Super League and the championship when it was replaced by three-year licences for clubs to play in the former. Promotion and relegation returned to Super League and the championship in 2015. The main knockout competition is the Challenge Cup, which also includes clubs from France and Canada, and in the past has also included clubs from Russia.

As a spectator sport, it historically ranks second only to football, with a record high of nearly 8 million spectators attending games in the 1948–49 season. It has also attracted the largest English stadium crowd outside London with the 1954 Challenge Cup Final at Odsal Stadium, Bradford attracting an unofficial attendance exceeding 120,000.

Rugby league is also played as an amateur sport, especially in the heartland areas, where the game is administered by BARLA. Since the rugby union authorities ended the discrimination against playing rugby league amateur numbers in the sport have increased, particularly outside the heartland areas. Through competitions such as the Rugby League Conference the sport is heading towards a national spread, at amateur level at least.

A single 'Great Britain Lions' team had competed in the Rugby league World Cup and Test match games, but this changed slightly in 2008 when England, Scotland and Ireland competed as separate nations. Internationally, only England (and sometimes Wales) field truly competitive teams in international rugby league. For many tournaments the home nations are combined to compete as Great Britain. The Great Britain team won the Rugby league World Cup in 1954, 1960 and 1972, but England and Wales now compete separately in this tournament and Australia have won every World Cup since 1975 except in 2008, when they were upset in the final by New Zealand. The Great Britain team is retained for some competitions, such as with Australia and New Zealand in the recently founded Tri-Nations competition, and in test series such as the Ashes (against Australia) and the Baskerville Shield (against New Zealand). In 2013, the United Kingdom hosted the Rugby league World Cup for the 5th time, with England and Wales officially serving as joint hosts.

==== Cricket ====
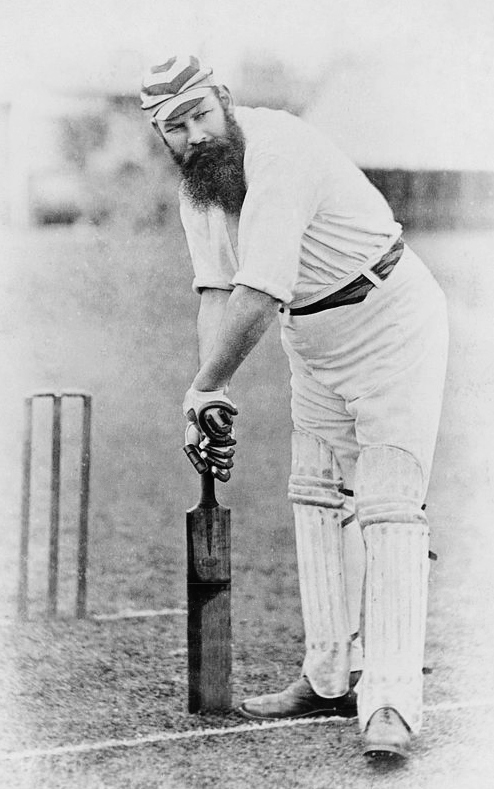
Cricketer W. G. Grace was the most celebrated British sportsman of the 19th century.

The early reference to the separate national identities in the United Kingdom is perhaps best illustrated by the game of cricket. Cricket has its historical roots within the UK. The national sport of England is cricket, but England has no team of its own, instead fielding a joint team with Wales. The England cricket team, controlled by the England and Wales Cricket Board, (commonly shortened to just "England" and "ECB" respectively) was the only national team in the United Kingdom with Test status until Ireland, which represents both Northern Ireland and the Republic of Ireland, received Test status in June 2017. Each summer two foreign national teams visit and play seven Test matches and numerous One Day Internationals, and in the British winter the team tours abroad. The highest profile rival of the team is the Australian team, with which it competes for The Ashes, one of the most famous trophies in British sport.

There are eighteen professional county clubs, seventeen of them in England and one in Wales. Each summer the county clubs compete in the first class County Championship, which consists of two leagues of nine teams and in which matches are played over four days. The same teams also play the one day National League, a one-day knock out competition called the Friends Provident Trophy, and the short-form Twenty20 Cup. English cricket grounds include Lord's, The Oval, Headingley, Old Trafford, Edgbaston and Trent Bridge. Cardiff's Sophia Gardens ground has also become increasingly popular in recent years. Team members are drawn from the main county sides, and include both English and Welsh players. It is by no means equal to football in finance, attendance or coverage, but it has a high profile nonetheless. It is probably the second most widely covered sport in England and third most widely covered sport in Wales and the fortunes of the England team are closely followed by many people who never attend a live game.

Scotland and Ireland both have their own cricket teams, but the game is neither as popular nor their teams as successful as the English and Welsh team. Ireland did not receive Test status until 2017, and Scotland still does not have Test status. Since Ireland did not play its first Test until 2018, Scotland still does not play Tests, and both have only recently started to play in full One Day Internationals, many Scots and Irish previously played in, and captained, the England and Wales side; the current side for example includes Eoin Morgan, a Dublin-born cricketer who has represented Ireland against England at the 2007 Cricket World Cup, and captained England against Ireland in 2011.

==== Hockey ====
===== Field hockey =====
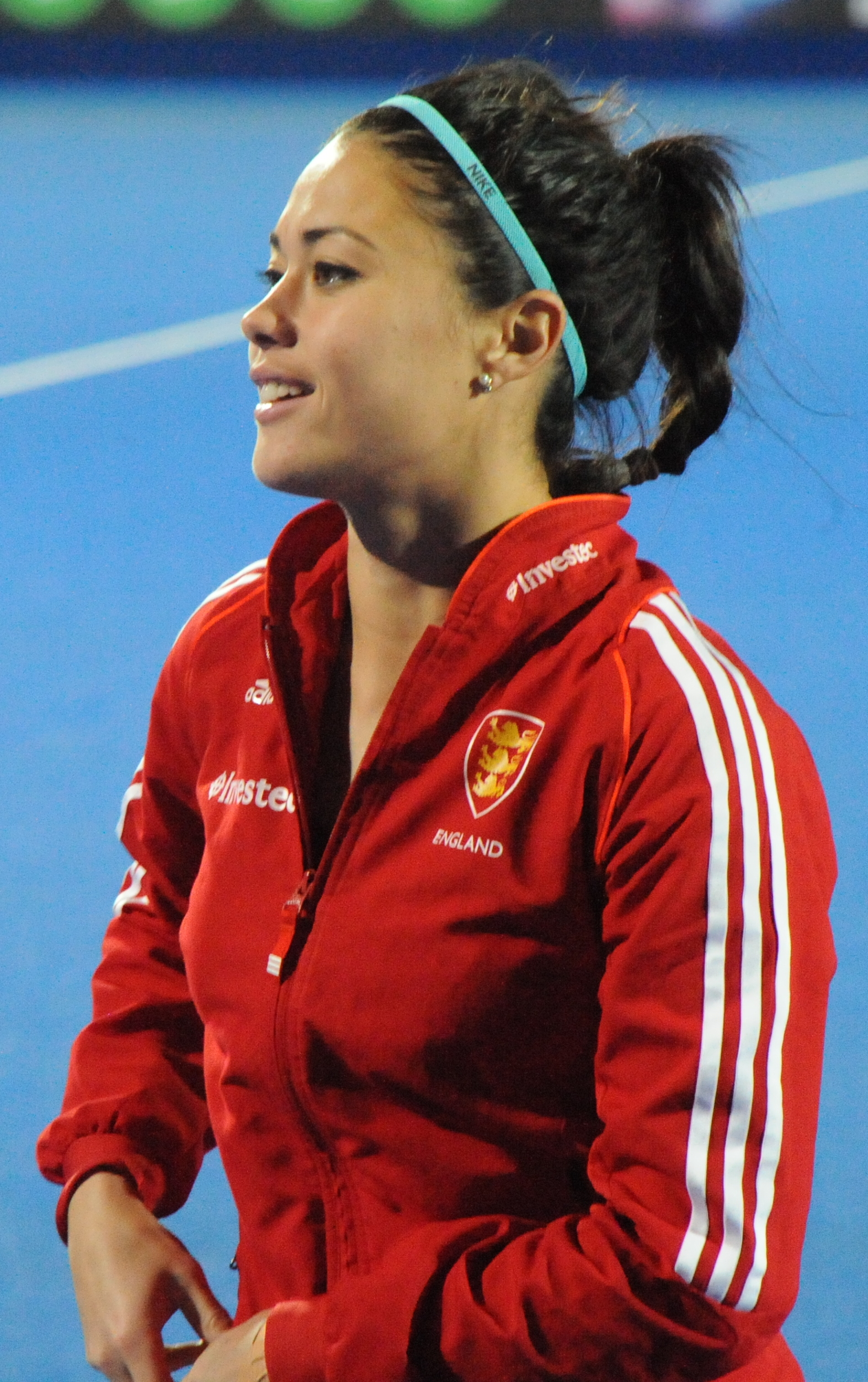
Sam Quek won gold as part of the British hockey team at the 2016 Summer Olympics.

Field hockey is a fairly popular recreational team sport in the United Kingdom. The Great Britain men's hockey team won the hockey tournament at the 1988 Olympics, while the women's hockey team repeated the success in the 2016 Games. While hockey receives widespread television coverage during the Olympics, coverage outside that is small, especially relative to its participation level. The success of the women's team in 2016 has raised the profile of the sport, the women's side and a number of the team's star players, notably captain Kate Richardson-Walsh and goalkeeper Maddie Hinch.

===== Ice hockey =====
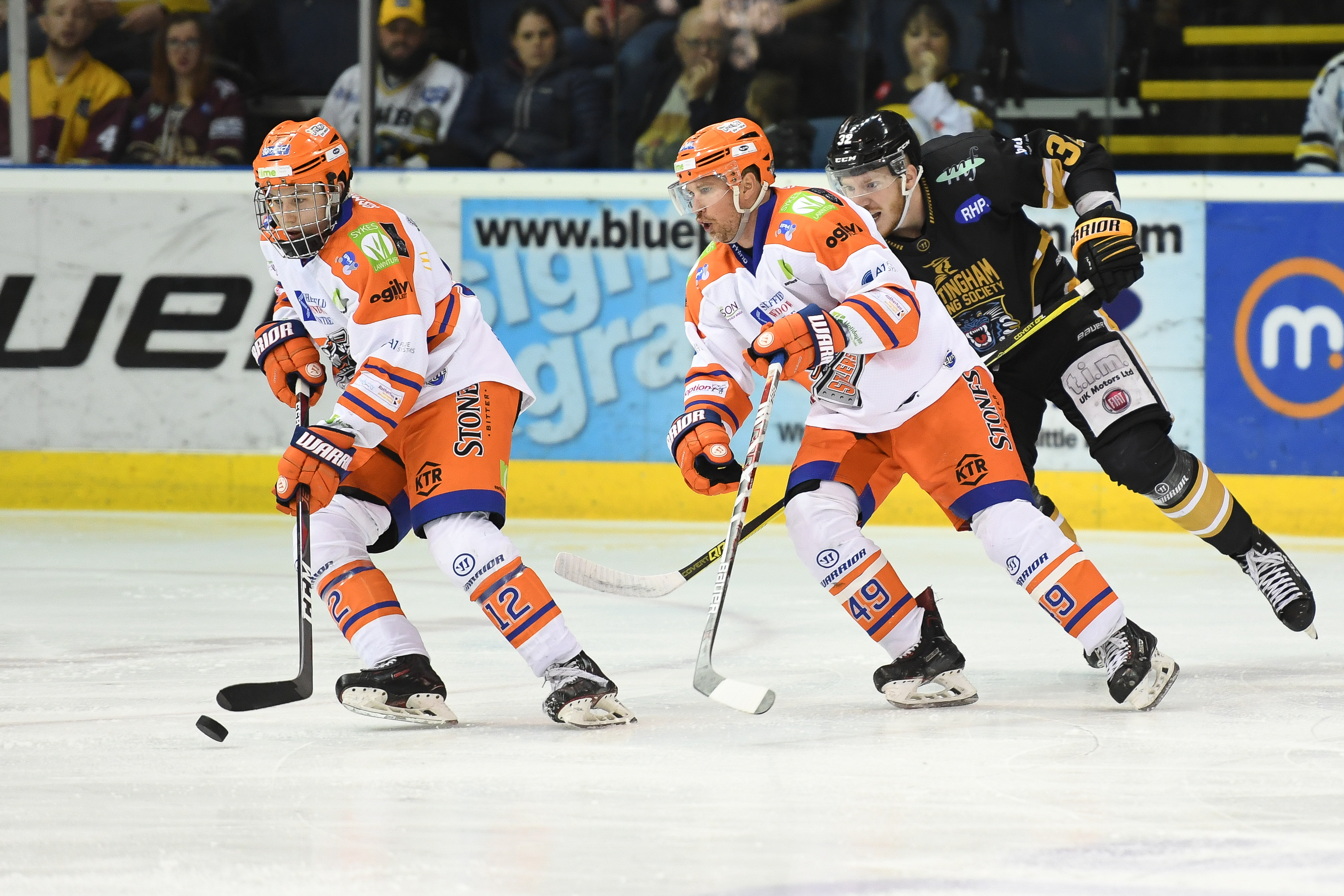
The biggest rivalry in British ice hockey between the Nottingham Panthers and the Sheffield Steelers

Ice hockey, a sport that originated in Canada (former British colony), is the only team sport to have a United Kingdom-wide league with at least one team from every nation. It has a long history in the United Kingdom and it is reasonably well supported, with the larger teams attracting thousands of fans to every game. Ice hockey is now being considered the United Kingdom's biggest indoor sport and fastest-growing winter sport. The main league is the ten-team professional Elite Ice Hockey League containing three Scottish, five English, one Northern Irish and one Welsh club. The league has featured many former NHL players, predominantly during the two NHL lock out seasons of 2004 and 2013. At the moment the Great Britain men's national ice hockey team is in the top division of the Ice Hockey World Championships. The team is ranked 17th in the world in the IIHF World Ranking system as of 2024.

Media support for ice hockey has improved on a national level, although the majority of news is still found on the internet. With a weekly highlights programme Sky Sports covered the Elite league from the 2006/07 season. Sky has also shown a small number of live games, but this has not happened since the 2011/12 season. Following this Premier Sports picked up the mantle for a number of seasons. On 31 August 2017, Premier Sports launched their sister channel FreeSports which showed eleven live EIHL games in the 2018/19 season including the Predictor-Bet Playoff Final and regular highlights show.

The Elite Ice Hockey League is well recognised in the world of ice hockey. This is highlighted by the 2010 visit of the Boston Bruins of the NHL, who took on the Belfast Giants at the Giants Odyssey Arena in Belfast, Northern Ireland, winning 5–1 over the Elite League All-Stars. The league currently ranks 7th in Europe.

==== Gaelic games ====
Gaelic games such as Gaelic football and hurling are organised on an all-Ireland basis and are highly popular in Northern Ireland, with a smaller presence in Great Britain. They are regulated by the Gaelic Athletic Association. Six Northern Ireland teams (Tyrone, Fermanagh, Armagh, Antrim, Down and Derry) feature in the All-Ireland Senior Football Championship, as do the London senior football team from Great Britain. In hurling, London beat Cork in the 1901 All-Ireland Senior Hurling Championship final, nowadays their hurlers compete in the third tier Nicky Rackard Cup. Antrim are the only Northern Ireland team in the first tier. The female equivalent of hurling is called camogie and is played by teams from Northern Irish and London. Gaelic handball with its roots in Scotland is still played at a competitive level in Northern Ireland.

Composite rules shinty-hurling is a hybrid sport which was developed to facilitate international matches between shinty players and hurling players. International rules football is a team sport consisting of a hybrid of football codes, which was developed to facilitate international representative matches between Australian rules football players and Gaelic football players.

==== Shinty ====
Shinty (or camanachd) is an amateur sport indigenous to the Scottish Highlands. Although it is mostly restricted to this area, it is highly popular within the Highlands, sometimes attracting crowds numbering thousands in what is the most sparsely populated region of the United Kingdom. It is administered by the Camanachd Association. Its main trophies are the Camanachd Cup and the Premier Division. It was once played throughout Scotland and England until the early 20th century. Nowadays, outside of the Highlands, there are also clubs in Edinburgh and Glasgow within Scotland. In England there has been a bit of a revival starting in the 2010s. If London Camanachd was the only remaining English club, in 2013 the English Shinty Association was founded and currently supports four more clubs, Cornwall Shinty Club, Devon Shinty Club, Bristol Shinty Club and Oxford Shinty Club.

==== Bandy ====
Invented in England, bandy has been virtually unknown in the United Kingdom for most of the 20th century, but this hockey sport played on ice with rules similar to football has been taken up again. The Bandy Federation of England was founded in 2010 and changed names to Great Britain Bandy Association in 2017. The national team for men made its official international début at the 2019 Bandy World Championship and at the 2022 Women's Bandy World Championship the national team for women participated for the first time. In 2025 the men's team plan to participate for the second time.

==== Basketball ====
Basketball, a sport that originated in the United States, has been rising in popularity in the United Kingdom. The top-level league is the British Basketball League (BBL) which follows an American franchise format rather than using promotion and relegation. Basketball receives little national press coverage in the UK, although coverage is more extensive from the local newspapers in cities where BBL clubs are based, with publications such as The Plymouth Herald, Manchester Evening News, Leicester Mercury and the Newcastle Chronicle all having dedicated basketball reporters who cover the respective local team. Some national newspapers list results and occasionally provide short summaries of the League's news, but more extensive coverage remains minimal. Below the BBL is the English National Basketball League (NBL) operated by Basketball England and the Scottish Basketball Championships (SBC) operated by Basketball Scotland.

The Great Britain Men's National Team (GBMNT) and the Great Britain Women's National Team (GBWNT) are governed by the British Basketball Federation and represent Great Britain in international basketball competitions. The teams compete in three major tournaments; FIBA EuroBasket, the FIBA Basketball World Cup, and the Olympic Games. Prior to 2006, England, Scotland, and Wales competed independently in international competition except for the Olympic Games and Olympic Qualifying Tournaments.

The Great Britain Men's National Team have qualified for five of the last six FIBA EuroBaskets (2009, 2011, 2013, 2017, 2022). An impressive achievement for a nation that had only qualified for six FIBA EuroBaskets in the 60 years prior to 2006 when England, Scotland, and Wales competed independently. England had made four appearances (1946, 1955, 1961, 1981) and Scotland two (1951, 1957). The Great Britain Women's National team have qualified for five of the last seven FIBA EuroBaskets (2011, 2013, 2015, 2019, 2023) missing out in 2017 and 2021. In 2019, the GBWNT advanced to the semi-final stage of FIBA EuroBasket Women, the best ever finish for a British national team in a major basketball tournament. Whether competing as Great Britain or as one of the home nations, no British team has ever qualified for the FIBA World Cup during the 70-year history of the competition. The Great Britain Men's National Team has played in two Olympic Games, both times as hosts when qualifying was not required (1948, 2012), while the Women made their first appearance in 2012.

The British player Tarik Philip was added to the Washington Wizards roster at the end of the 2018–19 season. The most recent NBA player to have been developed in the British basketball system, South Sudanese refugee and naturalised British citizen Luol Deng retired at the end of the 2018–19 season. At the time of his retirement, Deng career on-court earnings of $151 million, making him the highest earner of any British player in history, and one of the highest paid British athletes. During the 2019–20 season, only one player born in the UK with British nationality was on an NBA roster—OG Anunoby with the Toronto Raptors. Anunoby emigrated to the US as a child, playing youth basketball in Missouri and college basketball for Indiana. Whilst Admiral Schofield, who played that season with the Washington Wizards, was born in London, he has never held British nationality; he was born to a U.S. Navy family, and returned to the U.S. with his family in early childhood. Other British basketball players who have played in the NBA include Chris Harris, Steve Bucknall, James Donaldson, John Amaechi, Robert Archibald, Ndudi Ebi, Michael Olowokandi, Pops Mensah-Bonsu, Kelenna Azubuike, Byron Mullens, Ben Gordon, and Joel Freeland.

As with the NFL and American football, the NBA has arranged regular season matches in London for several years now, the most recent being a 2018 game between the Boston Celtics and Philadelphia 76ers at the O2 Arena. Former NBA commissioner David Stern enthusiastically discussed the possibility of the NBA expanding into Europe, at one point envisioning a new division of 5 teams based in London, Paris, Berlin, Italy (Rome or Milan), and Spain (Madrid or Barcelona). Though in 2012, Stern went on to say that of the sites suggested only London and Berlin had arenas of the standard expected in the NBA, while Spain's and Italy's domestic leagues had become increasingly popular. The idea of a single team or pair of teams relocating to London and Berlin was dismissed as uneconomical due to the distances involved for away fixtures.

A 2018 piece on the web outlet of US sports media giant ESPN explored why British basketball has so far failed to develop players to the degree of countries such as France, Germany and Australia. The first is the dominance of other sports, especially football, in the country's sporting culture. A 2016 survey by Sport England found that basketball was the third most-played sport among the 14–25 age group in England, just behind rugby union in numbers—but both sports combined have less than one-third the participation of football. Additionally, a British sport journalist pointed out that football academies are "really bad at letting players out of the system who aren't going to make it", frequently keeping players until age 17 or 18, beyond an age at which they can reasonably be developed for top-level basketball. Another issue is politically related. Basketball is not played in the elite fee-paying secondary schools that produce a disproportionate share of the UK's political leaders. Also, several British basketball insiders have cited problems with the sport's governance within the UK, with Kevin Routledge, chairman of the BBL's Leicester Riders, calling it "shambolic", and former NBA player John Amaechi saying "British basketball is dominated by people who are well meaning but poorly skilled". Funding is another issue. The British government provided many sports, including basketball, with major funding in advance of the 2012 Olympics. However, Team GB was perceived as a failure in basketball, with the women's team going winless and the men going 1–4, though losing by only 1 point to eventual silver medallists Spain. As a result, basketball's funding was dramatically cut. The sport also currently lacks private funding, with Amaechi claiming that many British BBL players are not paid living wages. Finally, until very recent years, British players were reluctant to develop themselves in the more competitive leagues of continental Europe.

==== Speedway ====
Motorcycle speedway, usually referred to as speedway, is a motorcycle sport involving four and sometimes up to six riders competing over four anti-clockwise laps of an oval circuit. Speedway motorcycles use only one gear and have no brakes and racing takes place on a flat oval track usually consisting of dirt or loosely packed shale. The United Kingdom has three domestic leagues, the SGB Premiership. the SGB Championship, and the SGB National League. The Speedway Grand Prix is the main world championship for standalone riders with an event taking place in Cardiff each year. The Speedway of Nations Final takes place over two days a year and Russia have won three SoN titles in a row since the competition began in 2018. Previous finals have been held at Wrocław, Tolyatti, and Lublin. The 2021 final is set to take place in Manchester.

==== Rounders ====
Rounders is a bat-and-ball base-running game played on a diamond. Played in England since Tudor times, it is referenced in 1744 in the children's book A Little Pretty Pocket-Book where it was called baseball. The game is popular among British and Irish school children. In 2015 it was played by seven million children in the UK. Gameplay centres on a number of innings, in which the two teams alternate at batting and fielding. A maximum of nine players are allowed to field at any time. Points (known as 'rounders') are scored by the batting team when one of their players completes a circuit past four bases without being put 'out'. The batter must strike at a good ball and attempt to run a rounder in an anti-clockwise direction around the first, second, and third base and home to the fourth, though they may stay at any of the first three.

==== Touch ====
Touch (or Touch Rugby) is a limited-contact sport variant of rugby league football. It is typically played with a mixed-gender team of six (three men and three women), with single-gender and age group variants. Teams play on a 70m by 50m pitch with rolling substitutions. There are no set pieces (e.g. scrums or lineouts) and kicking the ball is not allowed. Scores are made by grounding the ball over the score line as in Rugby Union or League; a team is allowed six touches in possession to attempt a score before the ball is turned over to the opposition.

It is administered globally by the Federation International Touch and by the England Touch Association, Scotland Touch Association, Wales Touch Association and Ireland Touch Association in the United Kingdom. The England Touch Association runs three national mixed series from April to September, as well as a men's and a women's series. More than a thousand players across over 40 clubs are registered to play in these competitions. There are also substantial local and regional competitions, many run with the involvement of O2 Touch.

=== Individual sports ===
==== Athletics ====
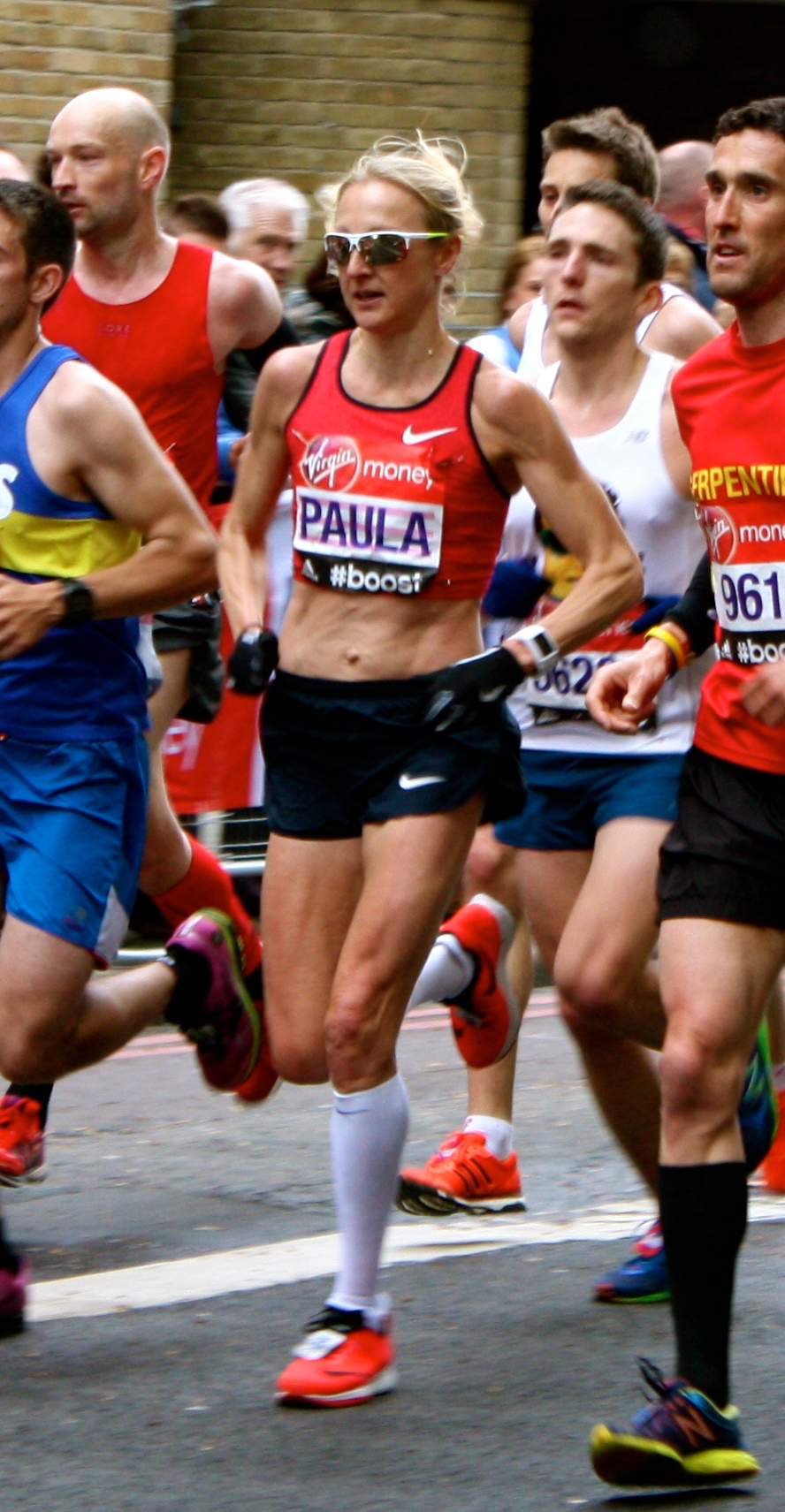
Paula Radcliffe marathon runner who set the world record for the women's marathon in 2003 and won multiple major marathons

Athletics does not have a very high profile in Britain on a week-in week-out basis, but it leaps to prominence during major championships. The level of attention received by successful British athletes is illustrated by the fact that athletes have won far more BBC Sports Personality of the Year awards than practitioners of any other sport. The governing body of British Athletics is UK Athletics. There are also semi-independent athletics associations in each of the home nations.

Over the last few decades British athletes have usually won between one and three gold medals at the Olympics; the 2012 Games in London saw three British athletes win four golds (single golds by Jessica Ennis and Greg Rutherford, and two by Mo Farah), while a further two golds were won in 2016 (both by Farah, who with four Olympic and six World titles is Great Britain's most successful track athlete). Traditionally Britain was strongest in men's athletics, especially middle-distance running in which Roger Bannister, Steve Ovett, Sebastian Coe and Steve Cram were global stars, but over the last 20 years success has been achieved in a wide range of events and British women have closed the attainment gap on the men, seeing particular success in heptathlon with major titles for Ennis, Denise Lewis, Katarina Johnson-Thompson, Louise Hazel and Kelly Sotherton. However, there remain serious concerns about the depth of the sport in Britain, with the number of club athletes reportedly in decline. In contrast, recreational athletics, especially running has enjoyed a boom under the Parkrun scheme.

Two high-profile annual athletics events organised in Great Britain are the London Marathon and the Great North Run, which is a half marathon, while the elite level Diamond League holds two events in the country, the London Grand Prix, commonly referred to as the Anniversary Games in reference to the 2012 Summer Olympics and the Birmingham Grand Prix. The indoor counterpart to the Diamond League, the IAAF World Indoor Tour also hold an event in the United Kingdom, the Indoor Grand Prix which has alternated between Birmingham and Glasgow.

The United Kingdom also has a significant recent record in hosting major athletics championships, having hosted the 2012 Olympic Games, the 2017 IAAF World Championships, the 2018 World Indoor Championships in Athletics, the 2019 European Athletics Indoor Championships and the 2014 Commonwealth Games between 2012 and 2019. Birmingham held the athletic competition in the 2022 Commonwealth Games and will host the 2026 European Athletics Championships.

==== Boxing ====
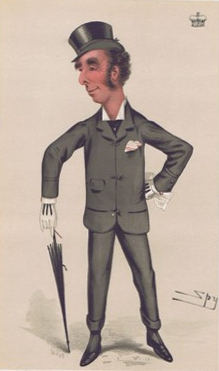
Vanity Fair caricature of John Douglas, 9th Marquess of Queensberry. The caption reads "A good light weight".

The United Kingdom played a key role in the evolution of modern boxing, with the codification of the rules of the sport known as the Queensberry Rules, named after John Douglas, 9th Marquess of Queensberry in 1867. Britain's first heavyweight world champion Bob Fitzsimmons made boxing history as the sport's first three-division world champion. Some of the best contemporary British boxers have included super-middleweight champion Joe Calzaghe, featherweight champion Naseem Hamed, and heavyweight champions Lennox Lewis, Tyson Fury and Anthony Joshua. Welshman Calzaghe's display against Jeff Lacy in 2006 prompted Lacy's trainer to state "I have never seen a better performance than that in the world."

British professional boxing offers some of the largest purses outside the United States to a few elite professional boxers who become nationally known. British heavyweight contenders are especially popular, but most British world champions have fought in the middleweight bracket. The governing bodies of professional boxing are the British Boxing Board of Control and British & Irish Boxing Authority. It is generally felt that British professional boxing is in decline in the early years of the 21st century. The reasons for this include: the fact that football now offers a relatively large number of sportspeople the chance to make the sort of income traditionally only available to world boxing champions, reducing the incentive for athletic youngsters to accept the greater risks of a boxing career; the acquisition of the rights to most major fights by Sky Sports, which means that fewer boxers become national figures than in the past; and the knock the sport's credibility has taken from the multiplicity of title sanctioning bodies.

Amateur boxing is governed by separate bodies in each home nation. At Olympic, World and European events, home nation boxers (with the exception of N.Ireland) compete under the GB podium squad banner. British amateurs have enjoyed success in international competition in recent years but unlike their counterparts boxing for the Irish Republic there's a tendency for them to turn professional early in their amateur career. The amateur sport is steadily recovering from a decline that reached a peak in the late 1980s, with dramatic increases in boxer numbers driven by recent GB podium squad success, most notably at the London 2012 Olympics. Although Britain's top amateur boxers are household names and lauded by the general public, the financial and commercial leverage that professional sports now have on televised media means amateur boxing rarely receives its fair share of T.V. coverage.

==== Mixed martial arts ====
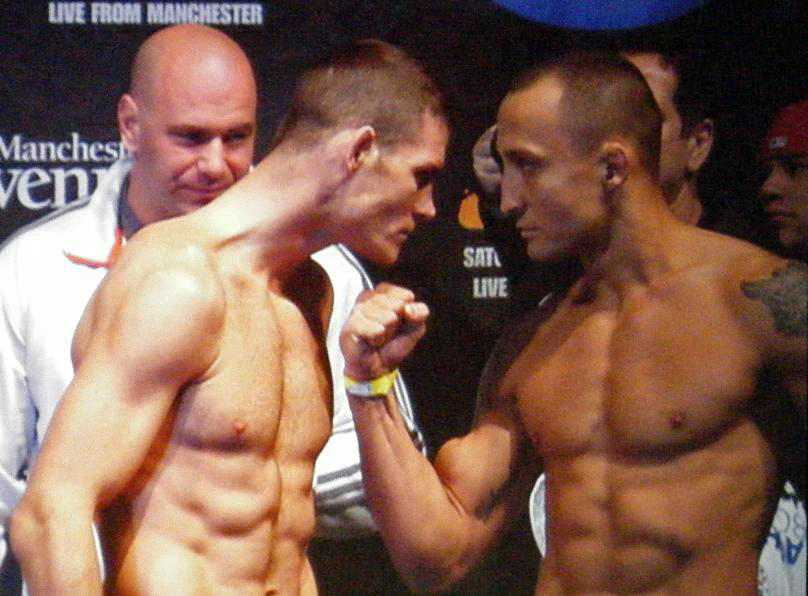
UK's Michael Bisping (left) squaring off against Canada's Denis Kang (right) at the Manchester Evening News Arena

In Great Britain, mixed martial arts (MMA) failed to capitalise on the early momentum in the United States and has not seen anywhere near the popularity levels MMA has received in USA. However, things slowly started to change when British Fighter Michael Bisping came onto the scene and won The Ultimate Fighter 3. Bisping helped build the popularity of UK MMA alongside Ross Pearson and James Wilks. The 2 winners of The Ultimate Fighter: United States vs. United Kingdom. Michael Bisping coached Team UK opposing Dan Henderson who coached Team USA. The popularity of UK MMA continues to grow due to British fighters and sports personalities including Paddy Pimblett, Dan Hardy, Brad Pickett, John Hathaway, Jimi Manuwa, Rosi Sexton plus many more, including Northern Ireland's Norman Parke, winner of The Ultimate Fighter: The Smashes Lightweight tournament and Scotland's Joanne Calderwood who competed on The Ultimate Fighter: A Champion Will Be Crowned.

The UK host promotions such as Cage Warriors and BAMMA.

UFC now have contract with BT Sport.

==== Cycling ====
Britain had limited success with cycle racing in the 20th century, although Tom Simpson's world road racing title, and subsequent tragic death on Mont Ventoux in the Tour de France remained iconic moments within the sport. While the Tour de France was consistently popular with a niche television audience on Channel 4, the sport was clouded by doping allegations and lack of mainstream interest. This changed when the performance director of British Cycling Peter Keen (formerly coach of Chris Boardman and later appointed in 2003 as performance director with UK Sport) obtained lottery funding which helped cycling, particularly Track cycling at both grass roots and at an elite level. The first fruits of the programme were harvested in 2000: at that year's Summer Olympics, Team GB took two bronzes, a silver and a gold on the track, backing up their success at the subsequent 2000 UCI Track Cycling World Championships on home ground in Manchester by winning five medals. Progress was made in the 2004 Summer Olympics under Keen's successor Dave Brailsford, where Chris Hoy and Bradley Wiggins won golds – the first time the British team had won two golds in track cycling since 1908, whilst Great Britain won 11 medals at the 2007 UCI Track Cycling World Championships, seven of them gold, and nine gold medals at the 2008 UCI Track Cycling World Championships in Manchester. The investment paid off in the 2008 Olympics; British cyclists brought home gold medals in seven events, most notably Chris Hoy who became the first British Olympian to win three golds at one Olympiad, earning him a knighthood. Other successes include Rebecca Romero and Victoria Pendleton. Great Britain became the dominant track cycling nation globally until 2021, when they finally lost their place at the top of the Olympic track cycling medal table, just, to Netherlands, but Great Britain remain a global force in the discipline.

Success at road racing was also limited, although sporadic success for British cyclists on the road was achieved by such athletes as Tom Simpson, Barry Hoban, Robert Millar, Chris Boardman, and David Millar. The United Kingdom provided no Tour de France champion, or Grand Tour champion, until Bradley Wiggins' victory in the 2012 Tour de France. This newfound British success continued with Chris Froome winning four of the next five Tours (2013, 2015, 2016, 2017), followed by Geraint Thomas taking victory in 2018. In addition to Wiggins, Froome and Thomas, other British riders to enjoy a significant level of success included road sprinting legend Mark Cavendish, elite climbers Adam and Simon Yates. Tao Geoghegan Hart, and Hugh Carthy, time trial riders Alex Dowsett and Ethan Hayter and the multi-discipline star Tom Pidcock, who won an iconic Tour de France stage on top of Alpe d'Huez, Olympic mountain bike gold, and World Cyclo-cross gold in a twelve-month stretch. Before 2011, no British rider had ever won a Grand Tour in cycling in almost 100 years, in 2018 all three Grand Tour races, the Giro d'Italia, the Tour de France and the Vuelta a Espana were won by different British riders; Froome, Thomas and Simon Yates respectively, and between 2010 and 2020, British riders won 11 Grand Tours in total.

Britain has had more historic success in women's road cycle racing in producing four road racing world champions including Beryl Burton, Mandy Jones, Lizzie Armistead and Nicole Cooke who also won the Olympic road race title and the world championship in the same year in 2008. Emma Pooley won the world road time trial championship in 2010.

Because of the increasing interest in cycling, a British UCI ProTeam (Team Sky) was formed for the 2010 cycling season. Major names in the roster included the likes of Bradley Wiggins, Edvald Boasson Hagen and the 2010 British men's Road Race champion, Geraint Thomas.

Cycle racing is organised by British Cycling, who govern most cycling events in the United Kingdom and organise the national team. Time trialling in England and Wales is organised by a separate body called Cycling Time Trials.

The success of British Cycling and team Sky has increased the popularity of the sport in the UK and has brought more sponsors into the sport. As well as Team Sky, ONE Pro Cycling and NFTO are aiming to ride in the world's biggest races. Many cyclists take part in the many sportives organised all over the country including the Ride London event. Words such as MAMIL (middle aged men in lycra) have become part of popular culture.

==== Golf ====
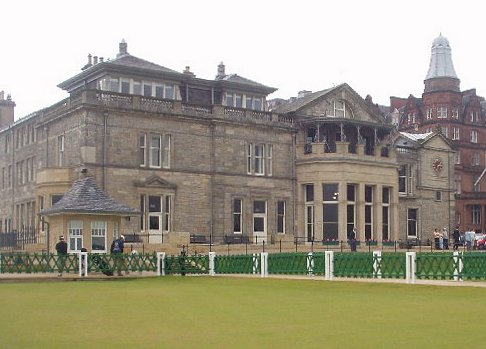
The Royal and Ancient Golf Club of St Andrews, generally regarded as the world's "Home of Golf"

Modern competitive golf originated in Scotland. In the early 20th century British golfers were the best in the world, winning nearly all of the US Open championships before World War I. American golfers later became dominant, but Britain has continued to produce leading golfers, with an especially strong period in the 1980s and 1990s. There are usually more British golfers than others in the top 100 of the Official World Golf Ranking relative to population, that is to say more than a fifth as many. Several British golfers have reached the world's top 10 in the early 2000s. England's Lee Westwood ended Tiger Woods' five-year reign atop the rankings in autumn 2010. In May 2011, fellow Englishman Luke Donald reached the top of the rankings, and by the end of that year became the first golfer in history to top the money lists of both the PGA and European Tours in the same season. Other British golfers to have appeared in the top 10 in the 21st century are Paul Casey, Ian Poulter and Justin Rose, all from England and Rory McIlroy from Northern Ireland.

Golf is the sixth most popular sport, by participation, in the United Kingdom. The Open Championship, which is played each July on a number of British golf courses on a rotating basis, the majority of them in Scotland, is the only men's major golf tournament which is played outside of the United States. The most famous of these courses is St Andrews, which is known as "The Home of Golf". The R&A, the governing body of golf outside the United States and Mexico, is based in St Andrews. Although The Royal and Ancient Golf Club of St Andrews, in Scotland, is the sport's home course, the world's oldest golf course is actually Musselburgh Links' Old Golf Course. The PGA European Tour is headquartered in England, and the main European Tour plays more events in the United Kingdom than in any other country. In international team competition the United Kingdom provides a large part of the European Ryder Cup team, which has beaten the United States team in seven of the last eight events.

Women's golf does not have as high a profile as the men's game, but British players, most notably Laura Davies, have found success on both the Europe-wide Ladies European Tour (LET) and the overwhelmingly dominant women's tour, the LPGA Tour in the US Through 2012, the Women's British Open was the only event recognised as a major by both the LET and the US LPGA. (The other tournament recognised as a major by the LET, The Evian Championship in France, became an LPGA major in 2013.)

==== Tennis ====
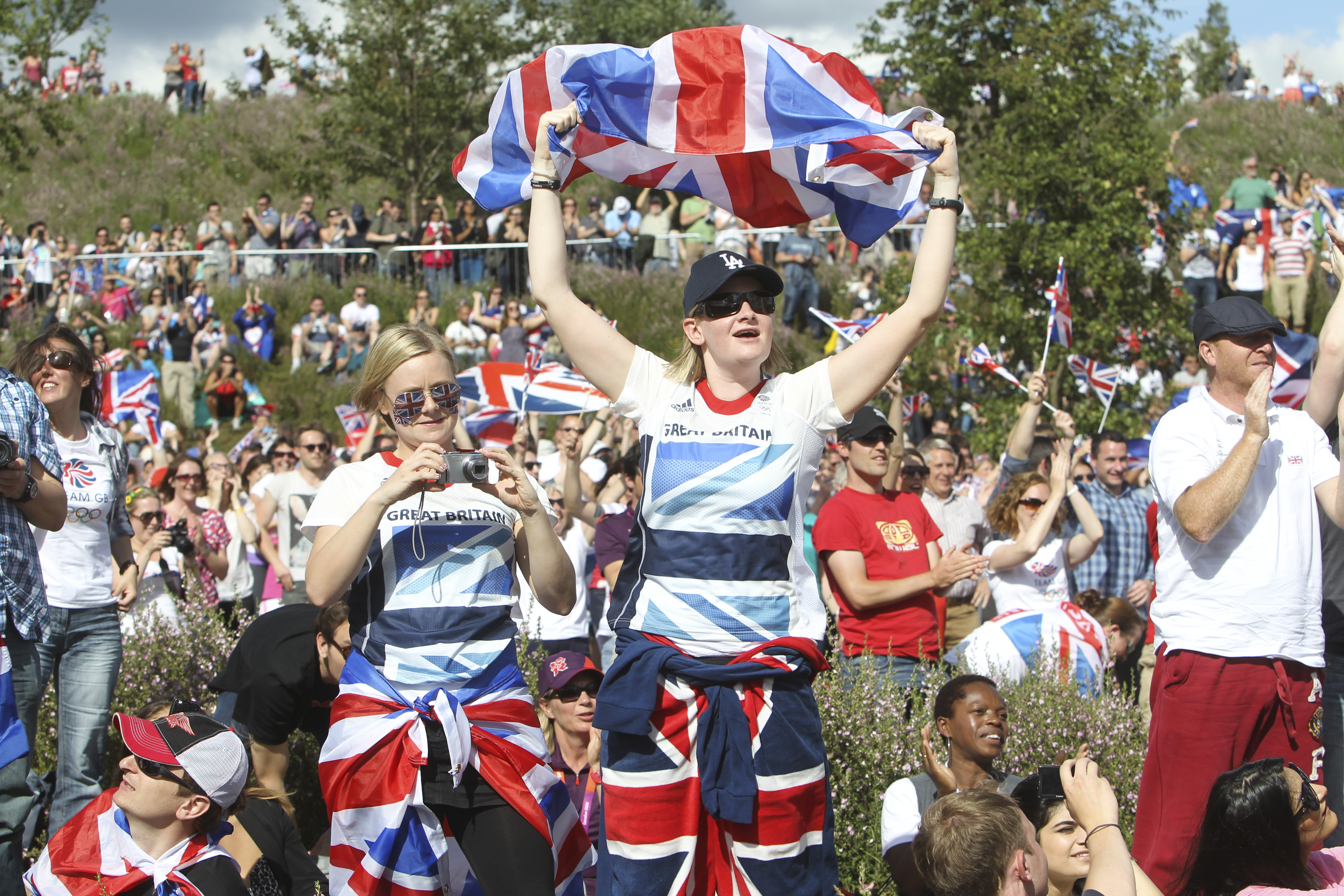
Fans at Live Site East on the Olympic Park celebrate Andy Murray winning gold, 5 August 2012.

Tennis is yet another sport which originated in the United Kingdom. It was developed in the city of Birmingham between 1859 and 1865 as a more open variant of the historical real tennis, or royal tennis, often associated with the Tudor monarchy of Henry VIII of England. However, professional tennis has not flourished in the UK in recent decades. Its profile there is highly dependent on the Wimbledon Championships, the most prestigious event of the global tennis calendar, hosted in London.

The governing body of the sport is the Lawn Tennis Association (LTA). This organisation has the vast profits generated by the Wimbledon Championships at its disposal to invest in player development, in the hope of producing more British champions. This effort has largely not been successful. The LTA has been variously criticised for subpar junior coaching standards, a lack of financial accessibility, and an inability to shift the British public's perception of tennis as a hobbyist sport.

The most successful British tennis player of the Open Era is Scotsman Andy Murray, who was ranked ATP world No. 1 for 41 weeks and won three major singles' titles, at the US Open in 2012 and at Wimbledon in 2013 and 2016. Murray was the first British man to win a major singles title since Fred Perry at the US National Championships (predecessor to the modern US Open) in 1936, and the first British man to win the Wimbledon singles title since Fred Perry (also in 1936). Murray also won two Olympic gold medals in men's singles, at London in 2012 and Rio in 2016. Murray did not pass through the LTA system as a junior, having moved to Spain to develop his tennis in a country with a more robust coaching structure and access to clay courts. He retired in August 2024.

Other successful male British tennis players of the past few decades include Greg Rusedski and Tim Henman, who both peaked at a career high of world No. 4 in 1997 and 2002 respectively; Cameron Norrie, who reached world No. 8 in 2022; and Jack Draper, who reached world No. 4 in 2025. Andy Murray's younger brother Jamie Murray has seen success as a doubles specialist, having won five major titles in mixed doubles and two in men's doubles. In recent years British men have seen a healthy amount of success on the doubles circuit: in March 2026, five British players (Neal Skupski, Lloyd Glasspool, Julian Cash, Henry Patten and Joe Salisbury) were ranked inside the ATP doubles top 10.

No British woman has won at Wimbledon since Virginia Wade in 1977. Wade remained the last British woman to win a singles major until teenager Emma Raducanu sensationally won the US Open in 2021. She became the first qualifier in the Open Era to win a singles major, and did so without dropping a set. Raducanu has seen more limited success on the WTA Tour since her maiden slam victory. Other successful British women of recent years include Johanna Konta, who peaked at world No. 4 in 2017.

Great Britain have won the Davis Cup ten times. Their most recent title, in 2015, was their first since 1936. The Great Britain women's team have made the final of the Billie Jean King Cup four times, losing all four. Their last appearance in a final was in 1981, when the competition was known as the Federation Cup.

==== Motorsport ====
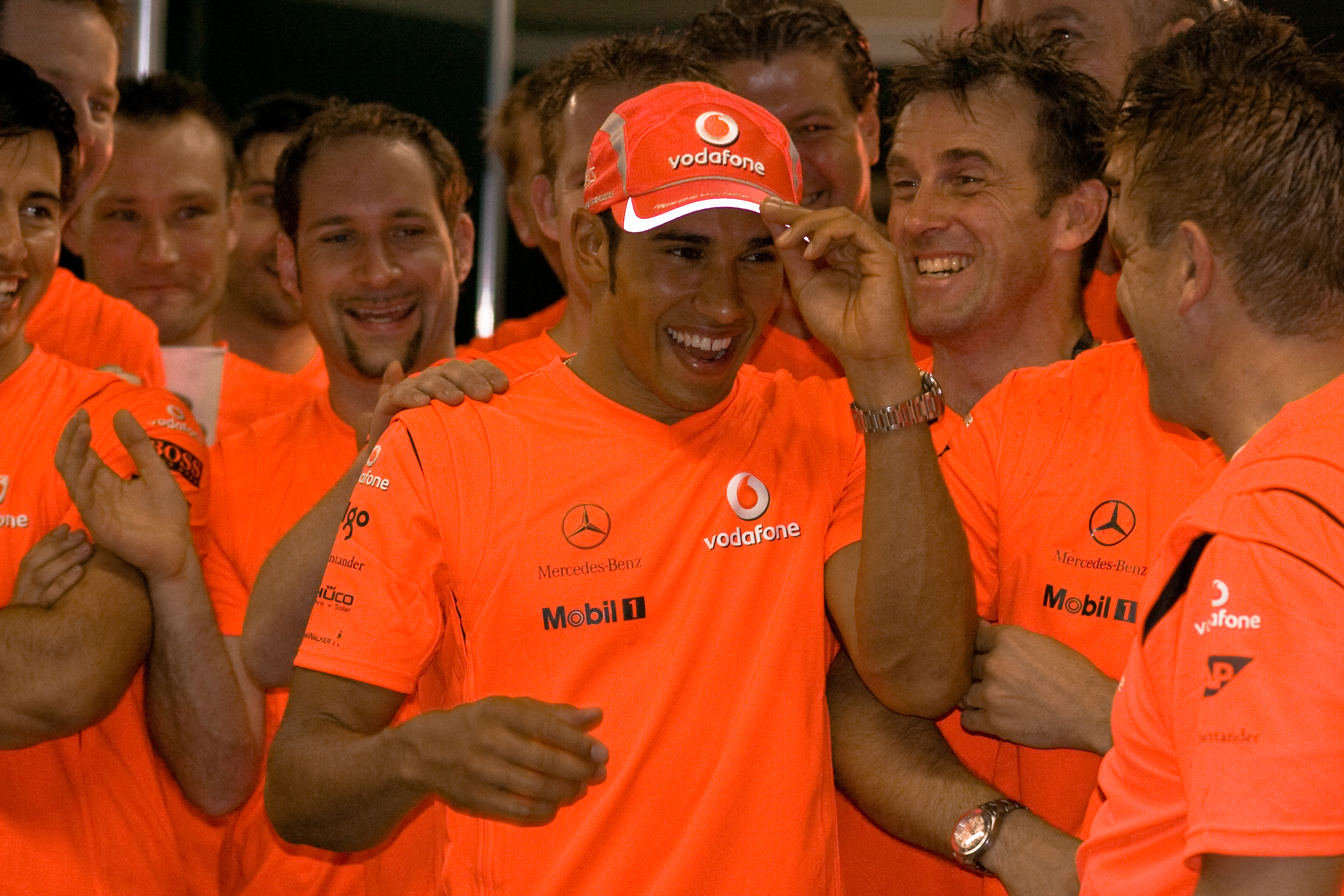
Lewis Hamilton, a Formula 1 racing driver with multiple World Championships, widely regarded as one of the greatest drivers in the history of the sport

Britain is the centre of Formula One, with the majority of the Formula One teams based in England, and more world titles won by drivers from Britain than from any other country, including Mike Hawthorn; Graham Hill (twice); Jim Clark (twice); John Surtees, also a world champion in motorcycling; Jackie Stewart (three times); James Hunt; Nigel Mansell; Graham Hill's son, Damon Hill; Lewis Hamilton (seven times); Jenson Button; and current World Champion Lando Norris.

John McGuinness at the Isle of Man TT

The United Kingdom hosted the very first F1 Grand Prix in 1950 at Silverstone, the current location of the British Grand Prix held each year in July. The country also hosts legs of the World Rally Championship and has its own touring car racing championship, the British Touring Car Championship (BTCC), and the British Formula Three Championship.

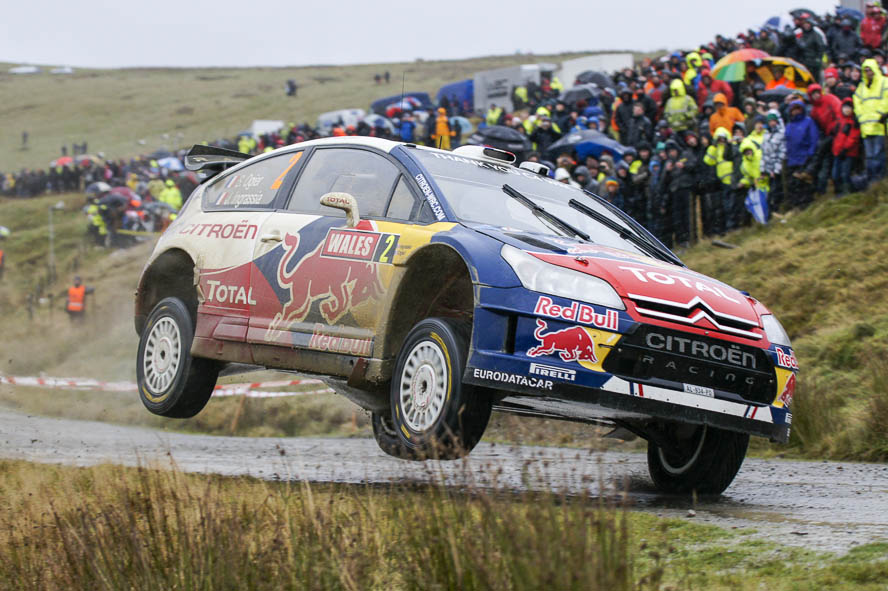
Wales Rally GB

British drivers have achieved success in the World Rally Championship, with late icons Colin McRae and Richard Burns previously winning the title, followed by Elfyn Evans. The British leg of the competition is the Rally Great Britain. Derek Bell is a five-time 24 Hours of Le Mans winner and one-time winner of the 1000 km Silverstone, the major endurance race of the country, formerly part of the World Sportscar Championship and currently part of the FIA World Endurance Championship.

Britain hosts one round of the MotoGP World Championship at Silverstone in early September, and celebrated its first motorcycle grand prix world champion since the late Barry Sheene with Danny Kent's title in Moto3 in 2015. The UK also hosts one round of the Superbike World Championship, at Donington Park. In 2007 the race had become the third Superbike World Championship round in Britain, but since then rounds at Silverstone and Brands Hatch have been dropped. The reigning SBK World Champion is Northern Irishman Jonathan Rea. Since 2000 the British Superbike Championship (BSB) has become increasingly popular. Road racing events are popular, with the Isle of Man hosting the Isle of Man TT and Northern Ireland hosting the North West 200. In rally raiding, Sam Sunderland became the first British winner of the Dakar Rally when he won the motorcycle classification in 2017.

Other motorsports include drag racing at Santa Pod Raceway, Formula E's London ePrix at Brands Hatch, and Rallycross, which began at Lydden Hill Circuit. Stock car racing is also followed across the country.

==== Triathlon ====
Triathlon popularity continues to grow in the UK with membership to the British Triathlon Federation up 174% since 2009, though numbers of participants are larger due to many people who swim, bike or run also participating in triathlons. One reason the popularity has increased domestically is due to the UK's strength at the international level with three gold, two silver and two bronze medals at the three most recent Olympic games and many wins on the international circuit. Many races are held over the UK hosted by local clubs with about 213,000 race entrants in 2017. The British Triathlon federation manages the GB team at both the elite and age-group level with performance centre's in Bath, Birmingham, Cardiff, Leeds, London, Loughborough, Nottingham, Stirling.

Global champions for Great Britain include Simon Lessing, Tim Don, Leanda Cave, Helen Jenkins, Non Stanford, Alistair Brownlee and his brother Jonny, Vicky Holland, Alex Yee and Georgia Taylor-Brown. Further success has been achieved at Ironman distances by the likes of Cave and Lucy Charles-Barclay.

==== Swimming ====
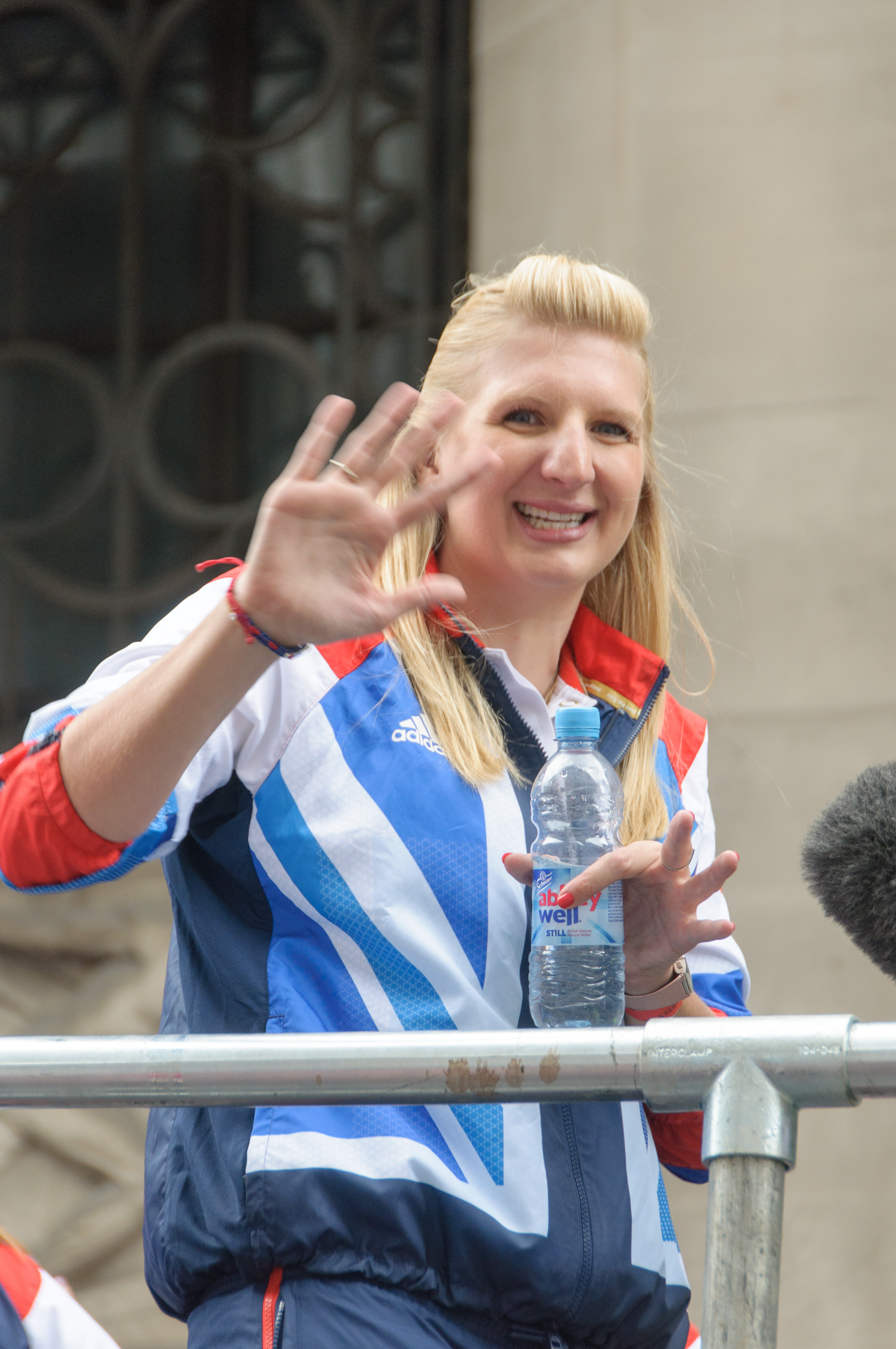
Rebecca Adlington, swimmer who won multiple Olympic medals, including two golds in Beijing 2008

Swimming is the largest participation sport in England according to Sport England (2014). It is larger than athletics, cycling and football. The swimming organisations of the home countries formed an umbrella organisation called British Swimming in the year 2000. British Swimming concentrates on elite swimmers with podium potential. Britain sends large teams to all the major international swimming events, and enjoy some successes, but it is not currently a leading swimming nation, trailing the dominant United States and Australian teams at major championships, although it is increasingly a power at European level. There has been significant improvement since 2012 under Bill Furniss, former coach of double Olympic and world champion Rebecca Adlington, which saw a record four gold medals in the swimming pool at the 2020 Olympic Games, led by legendary breaststroke sprinter Adam Peaty, and relay stalwarts James Guy and Duncan Scott, who became the first British Olympian ever to win 4 medals at a single games (1 gold, three silver). The sport's profile is highest during the Commonwealth Games, when British swimmers, swimming for their home nations, have their best chance to win gold medals, and during the Olympics. The sport has a thriving domestic club structure with competition at all levels.

The provision of 50-metre pools in the United Kingdom was very poor for a developed country, with just 22 as of early 2007, only two of which conformed to the full Olympic standard. There are however far more 25-metre short course pools and other sub Olympic-size competition pools. (See List of Olympic size swimming pools in the United Kingdom.) The number of 50m pools has now increased and there are 9 full Olympic size pools including the London Aquatics Centre pool which is regarded as currently the best pool in the world.

==== Snooker ====
Other sports with loyal domestic followings include snooker, which is a popular television sport as it fills their schedules at low cost, and also attracts good audiences. However, its popularity has waned somewhat since 1985, when nearly a third of the British population watched the conclusion of the celebrated Dennis Taylor versus Steve Davis World Championship final even though it ended after midnight. All but two events on the professional snooker tour in 2007/2008 are played in the United Kingdom, and the World Championship has been played at The Crucible Theatre, Sheffield, since 1977. There are many amateur leagues set up across the country, featuring team matches between snooker clubs.

==== Darts ====
Darts is another British centred sport with an assured place in the attention of the British sporting public. The two rival Darts World Championships were held in the United Kingdom since their inception. The BDO World Championship began in 1978 and ended in 2020; while the first PDC World Championship was in 1994 and continues to this day. Phil Taylor of Stoke has won more World Championships than any other player. Popular at the same time as snooker, with stars such as Eric Bristow, Jocky Wilson and John Lowe, darts also suffered a decline before the PDC revolution, led by entrepreneur and manager Barry Hearn helped turn the sport around financially and organisationally. The sport remains dominated by British stars such as Luke Littler and Gerwyn Price, but has now stretched out to success in Netherlands, Germany, Australia and China. Hearn latter became chair of World Snooker, and has overseen something of a revival in that sport also, utilising the wide support for flamboyant seven-time world champion Ronnie O'Sullivan.

==== Other individual sports ====
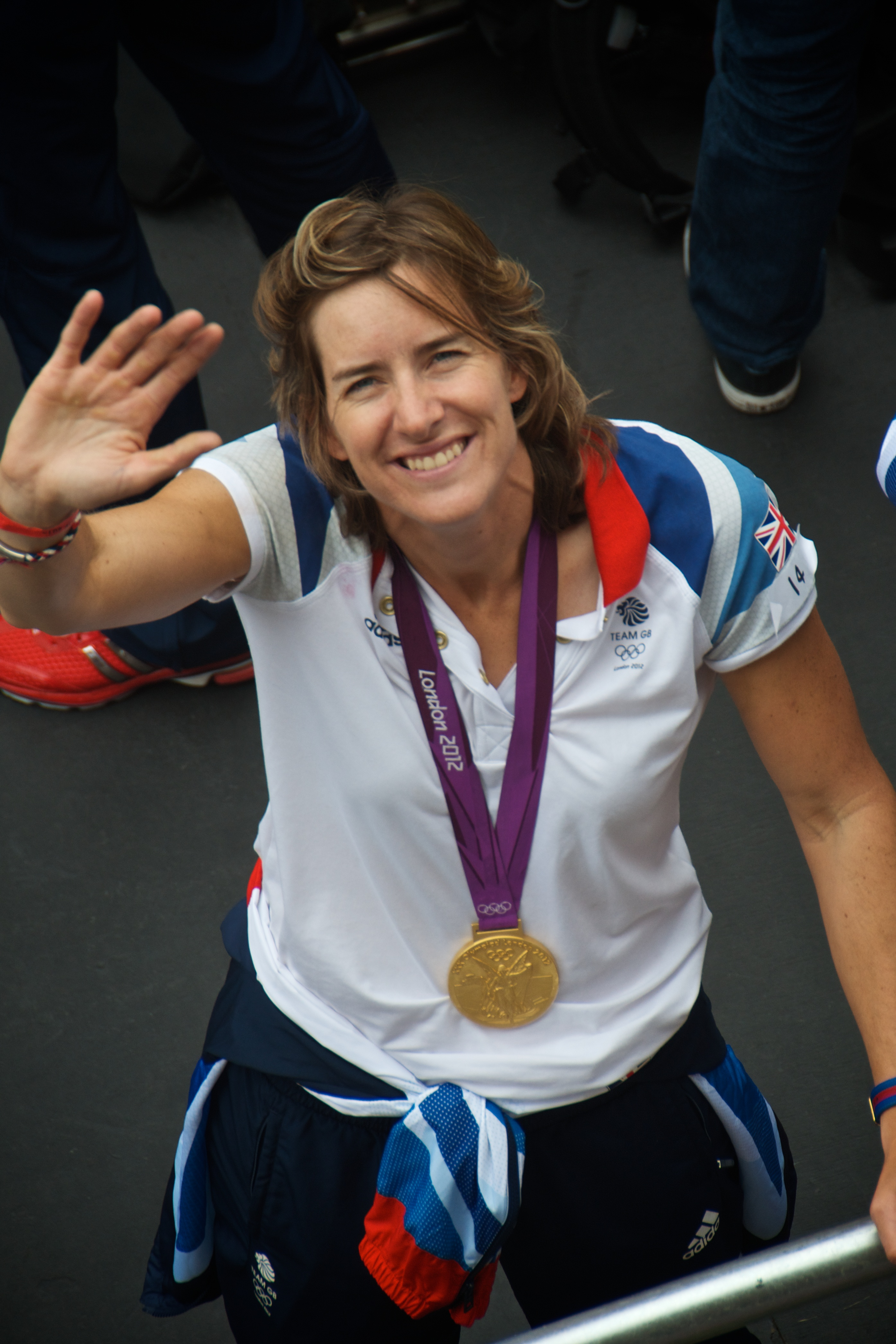
Katherine Grainger, rower who is Great Britain's most decorated female Olympian, with five Olympic medals including gold

Table Tennis is, according to Sport England a widely participated physical activity with around 200000 participants and a large number of regional clubs enrolled to the English Table Tennis Association

Sailing is a niche but a well regarded sport in the United Kingdom. It is governed by the RYA, and there are many locations in the United Kingdom where sailing can take place, both inland and coastal. Media coverage is low except for the Olympic Games, although there is a history of significant media interest in endurance navigation such as the Round-the-World Yacht Race, the Americas Cup and figures such as Ellen Macarthur, Ben Ainslie, Robin Knox-Johnston and the tragic Donald Crowhurst.

Orienteering is regulated by the British Orienteering Federation, and Britain generally puts on a very strong show at the World Orienteering Championships with Jamie Stevenson, second at WOC in 2006.

The United Kingdom has proved successful in the international sporting arena in rowing. It is widely considered that the sport's most successful rower is Steve Redgrave who won five gold medals and one bronze medal at five consecutive Olympic Games, as well as numerous wins at the World Rowing Championships and Henley Royal Regatta.

There are many other sports in which Britons compete, sometimes with success, but which do not receive much attention outside a small number of aficionados except during major events such as the Olympics and the Commonwealth Games, or when a British athlete does something extraordinary such as breaking a world record. Examples include judo, gliding, modern pentathlon, figure skating, fives, and sailing.

=== Equestrian sports ===
==== Horseracing ====
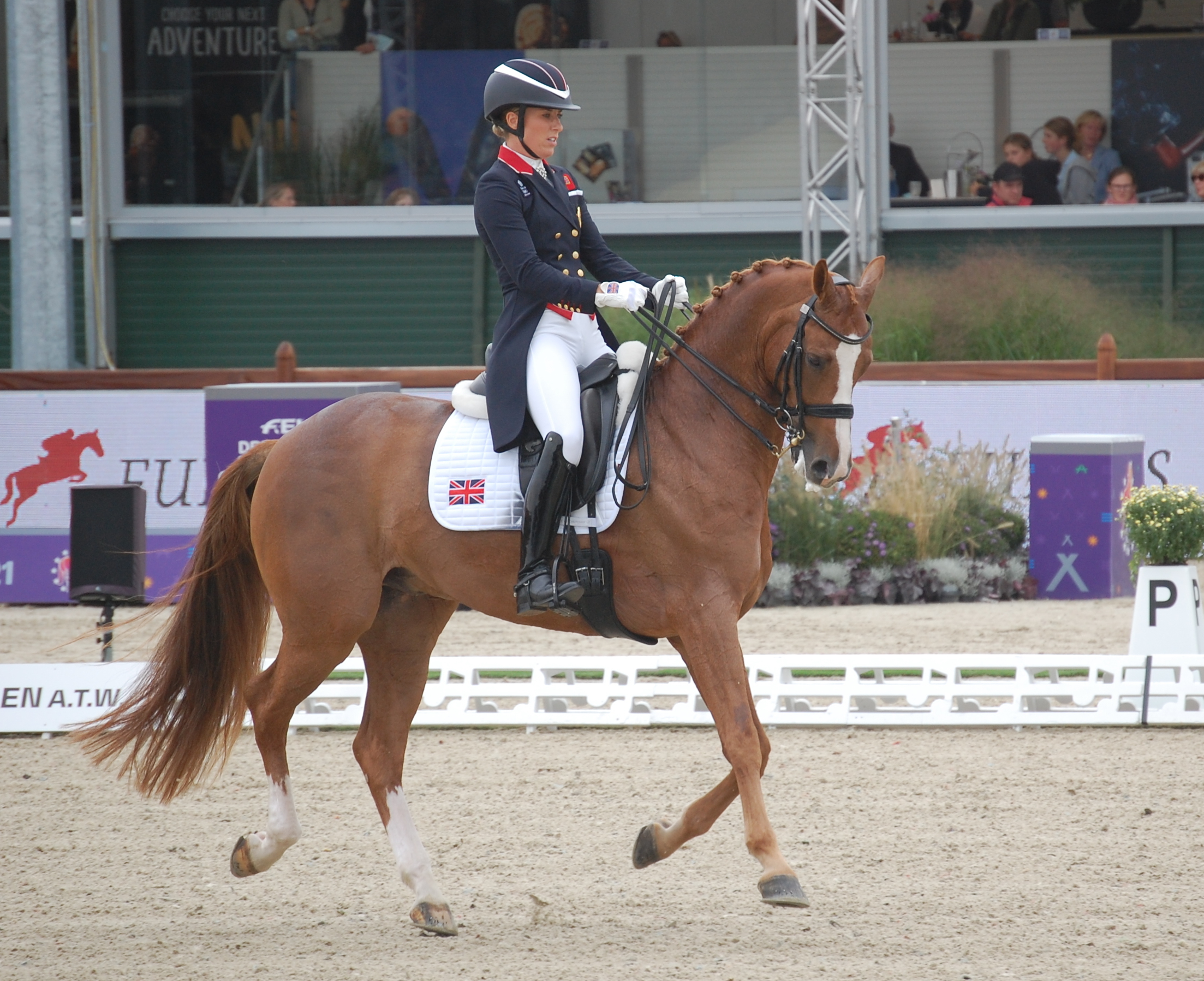
Charlotte Dujardin, equestrian who has dominated in dressage, winning multiple Olympic gold medals and World Championships

Thoroughbred racing, which originated under Charles II of England as the "sport of kings", occupies a key place in British sport, probably ranking in the top four or five sports in terms of media coverage. There are sixty racecourses in Great Britain with annual racecourse attendance exceeding six million and roughly 13,500 races being held across Britain and Ireland each year. The sport in Great Britain is governed by the British Horseracing Authority. The two racecourses in Northern Ireland are governed by Horse Racing Ireland, which runs the sport on an All-Ireland basis. The town of Newmarket is considered the centre of English racing, largely because of the famous Newmarket Racecourse.

The two forms of horse-racing in the United Kingdom are National Hunt, which involves jumping over fences or hurdles, and the more glamorous flat racing. National Hunt is a winter sport and flat racing is a summer sport, but the seasons are very long and they overlap. In flat racing the three races which make up the Triple Crown are the 2,000 Guineas, The Derby, and the St. Leger Stakes. Other leading flat races include the 1,000 Guineas and The Oaks, and these five races are collectively known as the Classics. Apart from the meetings at which the aforementioned races are staged, major flat racing meetings include Royal Ascot, Glorious Goodwood, and the Ebor Festival at York Racecourse. The highlights of the National Hunt season are the Cheltenham Festival and the Aintree Grand National.

==== Eventing and showjumping ====
The United Kingdom also played a key role in the evolution of three-day eventing and showjumping. Two of the six annual three-day event competitions given the highest classification by the FEI are British, namely the Badminton Horse Trials and the Burghley Horse Trials. Badminton attracts crowds of up to a quarter of a million spectators on cross country day, which is the largest for any paid-entry sports event in Britain.

=== Great Britain at the Olympics ===
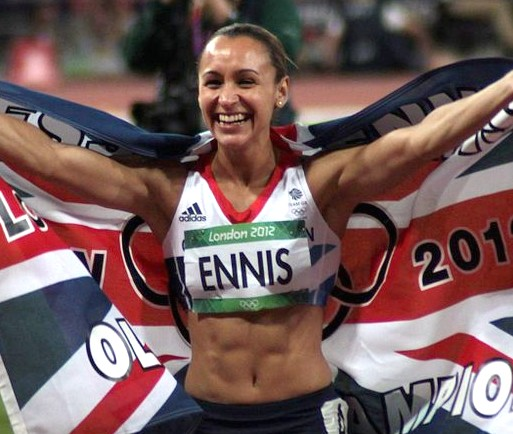
Jessica Ennis at the Olympics

The United Kingdom competes in the Olympics as Great Britain during Olympic competition. The British Olympic Association is responsible for the promotion of the Olympic Movement within the United Kingdom and for the selection, leadership and management of Great Britain and Northern Ireland at every Olympic accredited event. By longstanding practice, athletes of Northern Ireland have the option of being part of either the Great Britain or Ireland teams.

After the 2004 Summer Olympics Great Britain was third in the all-time Summer Olympic medal count (ranked by gold medals), although the majority of the medals are accounted for by some very large tallies in the first few Olympic Games. British medal tallies for much of the post-war period were generally considered disappointing, but the 2000 Summer Olympics marked an upturn and this was sustained at the 2004 Summer Olympics when Great Britain finished tenth in the medal table and the 2008 where it finished fourth behind only China, the US and Russia. This was seen as a great success, and there was a victory parade through the streets of London. This trend continued in the 2012 Games in London. Great Britain again finished fourth in the total medal table (behind the US, China and Russia), but was third in the gold medal count behind the US and China. In 2016 at the 2016 Summer Olympics in Rio de Janeiro Britain reached all time Olympic best by coming second in the medals table only being beaten by the US. The sports in which the British team has won most medals in recent Summer Olympics include rowing, sailing, cycling, and athletics. In addition to the 2012 Summer Olympics, London hosted the Games in 1908 and 1948.

Winter sports only play a minor role in British sporting life because the winters are not cold enough for them to be practised out of doors very much, with little suitable natural ice or snow. Great Britain is not a leading nation at the Winter Olympics, but has had a few successes in sports such as figure skating, curling and bob skeleton, and has had a guiding hand in the early stages of the evolution of three Olympic winter sports; curling, bobsleigh and alpine skiing. A number of athletes represented Great Britain in the freestyle skiing discipline when it debuted at the 2014 Winter Olympics. Snowboarder Jenny Jones made history at those Games as the first British competitor to win a medal in an event on snow when she took a bronze in the slopestyle competition. Another British snowboarder, Billy Morgan, won a bronze medal in the big air competition in the 2018 Winter Olympics. Matt Weston became the first Briton to win two gold medals at one Winter Olympics, dominating the skeleton events at Milano Cortina 2026.

== Disability sport ==
=== Great Britain at the Paralympics ===
The United Kingdom has played a huge role in the development of disability sport. The Paralympic Games originated in the Stoke Mandeville Games, which were held at Stoke Mandeville Hospital in Buckinghamshire in 1948. The Great Britain team does much better in the medal table at the Summer Paralympics, than at the Summer Olympics. It has never finished outside the top five and has been second several times, including the last five games in 2000, 2004, 2008, 2012, and 2016. The BBC is an enthusiastic promoter of disability sport. Former International Paralympic Committee president Sir Philip Craven is British. London's successful bid for the 2012 Summer Olympics also meant that it hosted the 2012 Summer Paralympics. Although Great Britain have been a minor nation in the Winter Paralympics, they have enjoyed particular success in women's visually impaired alpine skiing in the 2010s, with Kelly Gallagher becoming the first British Winter Paralympic gold medallist at the 2014 Games, when she won the super-G, and Jade Etherington, Menna Fitzpatrick, and Millie Knight all winning multiple Paralympic medals in the sport.

== Major sports facilities ==
In the early 20th century, the United Kingdom had some of the largest sports facilities in the world, but the level of comfort and amenities they offered would be considered totally unacceptable by modern standards. After a long period of decline relative to other developed countries, British facilities have made a relative improvement since the 1980s, and continue to improve.

=== National stadia ===
Locations of national stadia in the United Kingdom and Ireland. NB: Rugby Union and Gaelic Games operate on an all-Ireland basis so stadia show act as the national stadia for Northern Ireland as well.

Many of the best stadia in the United Kingdom were built for national teams:

- Wembley Stadium, England's national football stadium, home to the England football team, FA Cup finals, EFL Cup finals, FA Community Shield, English Football League play-offs, and EFL Trophy, 90,000 capacity. It has also held the rugby league Challenge Cup Final most years since 1929 – with up to a record 99,801 spectators attending (1985). As well as having hosted regular-season games of the National Football League, the major US professional league of American football, as part of the NFL International Series. In both 2011 and 2013, it hosted the UEFA Champions League Final. In the 2012 Summer Olympics, Wembley hosted a total of nine matches—six in the men's tournament and three in the women's tournament, including both gold-medal matches.
- Lord's, England and Wales national cricket stadium, home to England cricket team, Middlesex County team, 32,000 capacity. Lord's is widely referred to as the "home of cricket" and is home to the world's oldest sporting museum. It hosted the final of the 2019 Cricket World Cup. Bowls, baseball, tennis, archery and several other sports have been played at Lord's in the past. The archery competition at the 2012 Summer Olympics was held in front of the Pavilion.
- Twickenham, England's national rugby union stadium, home to the England rugby union team and occasionally used for major club matches, notably the London Double Header, 82,000 capacity. Twickenham hosted one NFL International Series game in 2016 and two in 2017.
- Millennium Stadium, Wales's national rugby union and football stadium, home to the Wales rugby union and football teams, 75,000 capacity. Also a football venue at the 2012 Summer Olympics.
- Murrayfield, Scotland's national rugby union stadium, home to the Scotland rugby union team and Edinburgh Rugby, a professional club team in the same sport, 67,000 capacity.
- Hampden Park, Scotland's national football stadium, home to the Scotland football team (the building is owned by Queen's Park but also contains the offices for Scotland's national team), 52,025 capacity. Also a football venue at the 2012 Summer Olympics.
- Windsor Park, Northern Ireland's national football stadium, home to the Northern Ireland football team and Linfield F.C.. Owned by Linfield and rented to the Irish Football Association for national team matches.

=== Club football grounds ===
British football grounds are almost always football-only facilities in which the spectators are close to the action. Since the late 1980s, there has been a dramatic spurt of reconstruction and replacement of league grounds, which is ongoing, and the Premier League's facilities are among the best of any sports league. As of early 2019, there are nearly 40 all-seater club grounds in England with a capacity of 25,000 or more, three in Scotland, and two in Wales. The largest is Manchester United's Old Trafford, which has a capacity of over 76,000, and the most recently built football stadia in the Premier League include the Emirates Stadium and the City of Manchester Stadium, with the new Tottenham Hotspur Stadium recently opened.

=== Cricket grounds ===
English cricket grounds are smaller than the largest in some other countries, especially India and Australia, but the best of them have been modernised to a high standard, and two new international grounds have been built in recent years. The largest English cricket ground, Lord's in London, is internationally regarded as the "home of cricket".

=== Club rugby grounds ===
Rugby union and rugby league clubs are generally poorer than their football counterparts. Some clubs have good all seater grounds in the 10,000–25,000 capacity range; some have older grounds which are still partly terraced, and others play in council-owned joint-use stadia (e.g. the KCOM Stadium). Some clubs rent stadia from football clubs. In some cases, union and league clubs share grounds; one current example where this exists is in Salford.

=== Golf courses ===
The United Kingdom has many world class golf courses, which can accommodate crowds in the tens of thousands for tournaments. The greatest concentration of these is in Scotland. The Open Championship is always played over a links course, the most famous venue being the Old Course at St Andrews on the east coast of Scotland. The Belfry in the English Midlands has hosted the Ryder Cup more times than any other site. Wentworth Club near London was once the only venue which hosted two European Tour events each season, but it now hosts only one.

=== Athletics stadiums ===
The provision of athletics stadiums in the United Kingdom is low compared to most other developed countries. The main reason for this, is that it is not considered acceptable to ask football or rugby fans to sit behind an athletics track. This means that athletics stadiums have to be separately financed, and this can only be done with public funds, which have not been forthcoming on a large scale. The largest athletics stadium built in the United Kingdom between Second World War and the 2010s, the 38,000-capacity City of Manchester Stadium built for the 2002 Commonwealth Games, was reconfigured for football-only use after that event. For many years, the largest existing stadium was the 25,000 seat Don Valley Stadium in Sheffield, and London's largest athletics venue was Crystal Palace, which has just 15,500 permanent seats. Both have since been superseded by the venue now known as London Stadium, which was built as an 80,000 seater for the 2012 Summer Olympics and became the new home of West Ham United F.C. in 2016. By the time West Ham moved in, the capacity was reduced to 60,000, and the track remained in place, with movable seating added to allow optimal configurations for both athletics and football. Since the retention of the track was a necessary condition for tenancy, the Olympic Stadium won the right to host the 2017 IAAF World Championships.

The Alexander Stadium in Birmingham was upgraded to a long term capacity of 25,000 (temporarily 50,000) for the 2022 Commonwealth Games.

=== Velodromes ===
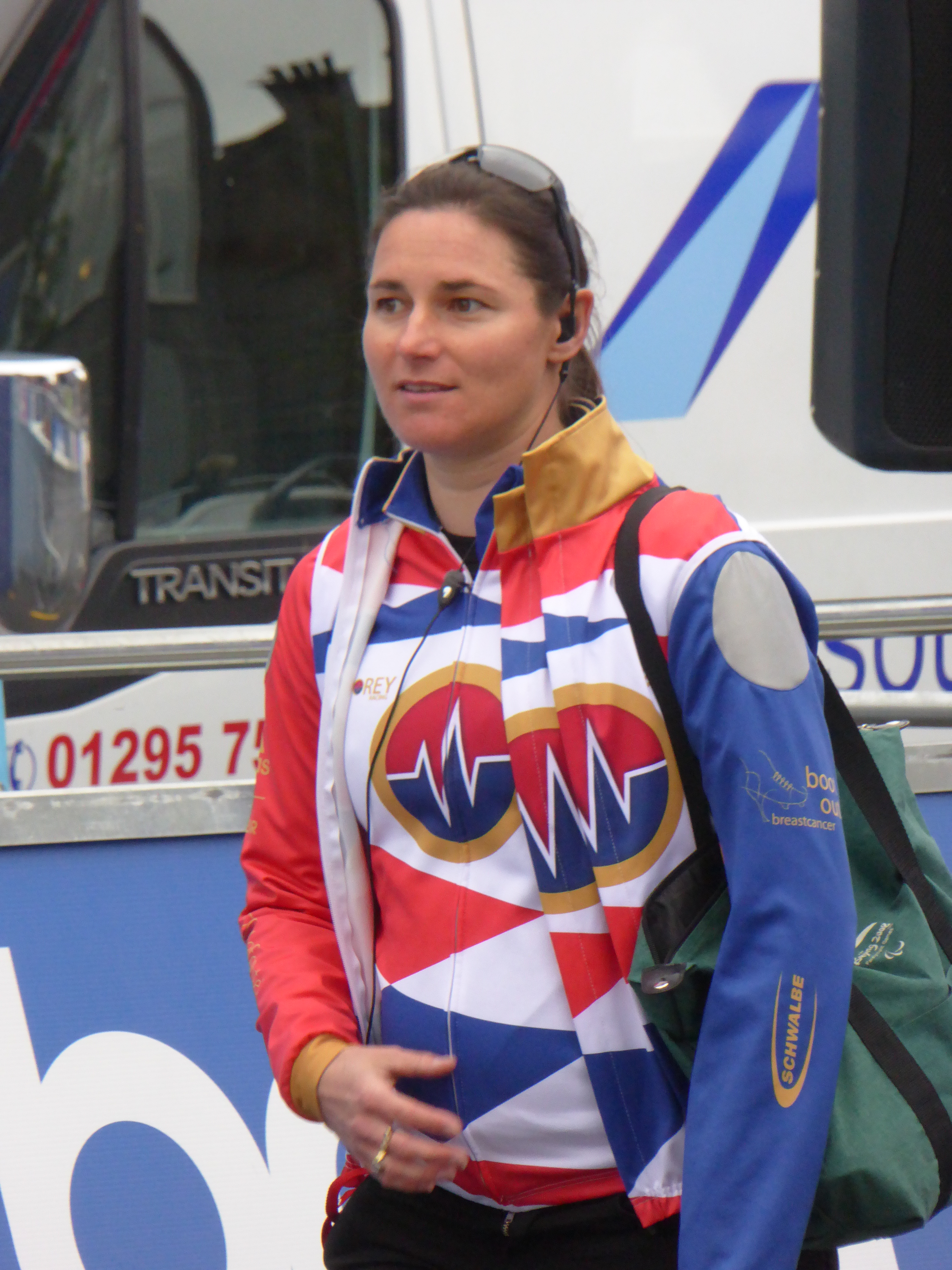
Dame Sarah Storey, paralympic cyclist and swimmer who has achieved multiple gold medals across several Paralympic Games

There are several outdoor velodromes for track cycle racing in the United Kingdom with Herne Hill in London being the only venue from the 1948 Olympics still in operation. There are also five indoor velodromes, one in Newport, the 3,500 seater Manchester Velodrome, part of the National Cycling Centre that serves as the headquarters of British Cycling, as well as the 6,000 seater arena built as part of the 2012 Summer Olympics in London, the 2,500 seater venue built for the 2014 Commonwealth Games in Glasgow and the 1,700 seater Derby Velodrome which opened in 2015.

=== Horse racecourses ===
There are 60 horse racecourses in Great Britain, with two more in Northern Ireland (the sport is governed on an all-Ireland basis). The best of them are world class. For example, Ascot Racecourse was redeveloped in 2005 and 2006, at a cost of £185 million.

=== Motorsport circuits ===
Silverstone Circuit, Donington Park and Brands Hatch are the three international motorsport courses. They have hosted the British Grand Prix, British motorcycle Grand Prix, World Endurance Championship, Superbike World Championship, FIA GT Championship, Deutsche Tourenwagen Masters and Champ Car.

=== Indoor arenas ===
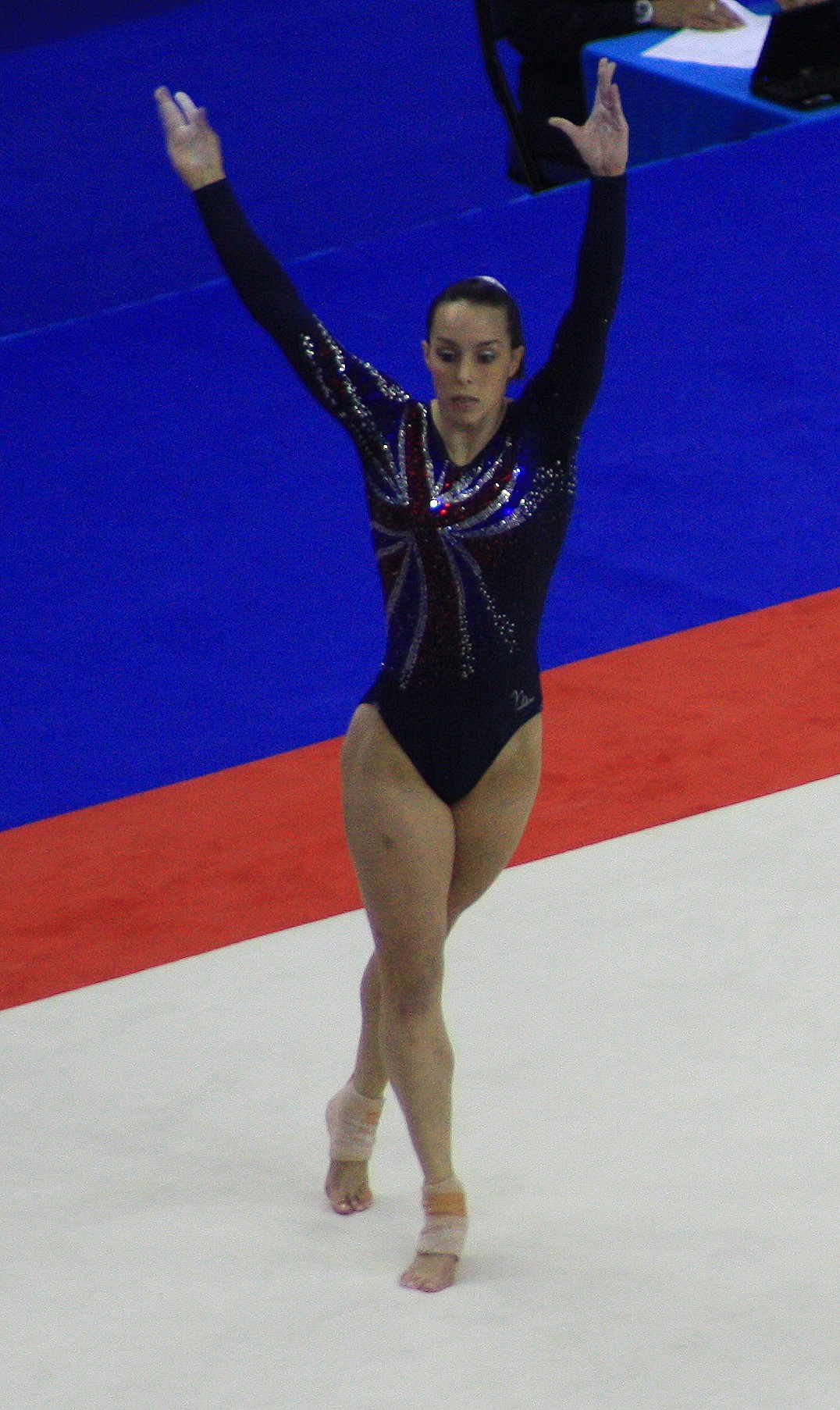
Beth Tweddle, gymnast who won multiple World Championships and an Olympic bronze medal

In the United Kingdom, there is no indoor sport capable of attracting five-figure attendances on a regular basis, and this restricts the development of large indoor arenas. Nonetheless, a number of 10,000+ seater arenas have been built in recent years and more are planned. These facilities make most of their income from pop concerts, but they occasionally stage boxing matches, and other sporting events.

The largest arena is The O_{2} Arena in London with a capacity of over 20,000, surpassing the former leader, the Manchester Evening News Arena in Manchester. Most notably, The O_{2} Arena has hosted the ATP Finals in men's tennis since 2009, and will continue to host the event through at least 2020. It also hosted the 2013 Final Four of the continent-wide EuroLeague in basketball.

The SSE Hydro in Glasgow, with a capacity of 13,000, was built for the 2014 Commonwealth Games and hosted the 2015 World Artistic Gymnastics Championships. The National Ice Centre in Nottingham, Odyssey Arena in Belfast and the Sheffield Arena all host ice hockey, the largest being the Sheffield Arena which holds in the region of 8,500 spectators.

Several smaller arenas hosting ice hockey and basketball are found around the United Kingdom, though these generally hold only a few thousand fans. The largest arena in the basketball league is Glasgow's 6,500 seater Commonwealth Arena, also built for the 2014 Commonwealth Games.

== Reigning British Champions ==
Sport	England	Wales	Scotland	Northern Ireland	Republic of Ireland (Note: The Republic of Ireland is not part of the United Kingdom but is included in this table as some sports are played on an all-Ireland basis.)
American Football	(England) Manchester Titans			?	(Republic of Ireland) University College Dublin
Basketball	(England) London Lions				(Republic of Ireland) Tralee Warriors
Cricket	(England) Nottinghamshire (First-Class); Worcestershire (List-A); Northants Steelbacks (Twenty20); Manchester Originals (100-Ball)		N/A	(Republic of Ireland) North West Warriors	
Field Hockey	(England) Old Georgians	?	?	?	(Republic of Ireland) Banbridge
Football	(England) Arsenal	(England) The New Saints	(Scotland) Celtic	(Northern Ireland) Larne	(Republic of Ireland) Shelbourne
Gaelic Football	N/A			(Republic of Ireland) Mayo	
Hurling	N/A			(Republic of Ireland) Limerick	
Ice Hockey	(England) Sheffield Steelers				?
Rugby League	(England) Wakefield Trinity			(Republic of Ireland) Banbridge Broncos	
Rugby Union	(England) Northampton Saints	(Republic of Ireland) Leinster			
Underwater Hockey	(England) Team South West			?	

== Student sport ==
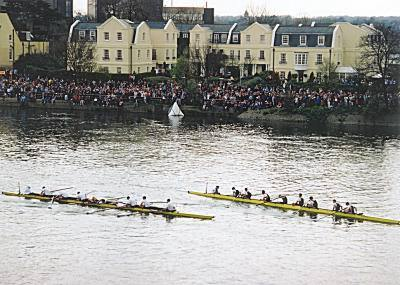
The Boat Race between Oxford and Cambridge university crews

Student sport has a long history in the United Kingdom, which played a role in the development of modern sports and the spread of university sport around the world. Today, student sport has significant participation, ranging from student-run intramural sport within universities, to varsity matches with rival universities, and inter-university competitive sports organised by British Universities and Colleges Sport. In addition, Scottish Student Sport run over 100 events each year for universities in Scotland including the annual multi-sport Scottish Student Games. Students at universities in Northern Ireland can also participate in Student Sport Ireland events.

Nonetheless, apart from a couple of well-known Oxbridge events, student sport has a low public profile. Historically, budding professionals in the traditionally working class team sports of football and rugby league rarely went to university. Talented young players in the more middle class sports of cricket and rugby union were more likely to attend university, but their sports clubs usually played a greater role in developing their talent than their university coaches. While universities had significant sports facilities, there were no tuition fees for attending university until the late 1990s, and thus no sports scholarships. Some sports are attempting to adapt to new conditions in which a far higher proportion of British teenagers attend university than in the past, notably cricket, which has established several university centres of excellence. Today, students who are elite standard competitors are eligible for funding from bodies such as UK Sport. The university most focused on sports provision is Loughborough University.

== School sport ==
Public schools played a significant role in the development of modern sports, including through English public school football games, which shaped university sport and British sports that spread worldwide.

Today, the leading body for physical education in the United Kingdom is the Association for Physical Education. In 2006, the UK School Games was established by the Youth Sport Trust as an annual sporting competition for elite school age athletes in the United Kingdom, and by 2008, was expanded to include nine sports over four days.

== Related reads ==
- List of national sports teams of the United Kingdom
- Politics and sports
- Sport in England
- Sport in Ireland
- Sport in Northern Ireland
- Sport in Scotland
- Sport in Wales
- Sport in the Isle of Man
- Sport in Jersey
- Sport in Guernsey
- Sport in Gibraltar
- Commonwealth Games England
- Commonwealth Games Council for Scotland
- Commonwealth Games Council for Wales
- History of sport
- Western sports
