= Terry Denison (swimming coach) =

British swimming coach

Terry Denison MBE (born 7 December 1940) is a British former swimming coach from Leeds.

== Coaching career ==
Denison was Head Coach at City of Leeds Swimming Club for 30 years. Denison coached at 7 European Championships, 4 Commonwealth Games, 2 World Championships and 6 Olympic games. He retired in March 2003. Swim England described him as "one of Great Britain’s most successful swimming coaches".

== Honours and awards ==
Denison was appointed Member of the Order of the British Empire (MBE) in the 1998 New Year Honours for services to swimming. He is a member of the Swim England Hall of Fame and the British Swimming Coaches Association (BSCA) Hall of Fame. He was voted BSCA Coach of the Year 10 times.
