= Bill Furniss =

British swimming coach

William Michael Furniss OBE (born 23 March 1954) from Nottinghamshire was the main swimming coach for the British swimming team (and Team GB) from 2004 until 2024.

== Early life ==
He was born in Sheffield. He studied Sports Science at university.

== Career ==
He began swimming coaching in the late 1970s. He became a full-time swimming coach in 1980 in Nottingham.

=== Commonwealth Games ===
In December 1993 he was named as the head coach for the England team in the 1994 Commonwealth Games in Canada. Barbara Lancaster was the team manager.

=== European Championships ===
In March 1995 he was named as head coach for the British team at the 1995 European Aquatics Championships in Austria, organized by LEN (Ligue Européenne de Natation).

=== British Swimming ===
In September 1995 he resigned as head coach to the British swimming team, then run by the Amateur Swimming Federation of Great Britain. By 1996 he was again the head coach of the Great Britain Swimming Federation.

Dennis Pursley, an American swimming coach, left his position as head coach of British Swimming after the 2012 Summer Olympics, and he was replaced by Bill Furniss. In October 2015 Furniss was named as the head coach for the Team GB swimming team in the 2016 Olympics.

== Honours and awards ==
Furniss was appointed Officer of the Order of the British Empire (OBE) in the 2017 Birthday Honours for services to swimming. He is a member of the British Swimming Coaches Association Hall of Fame as an Olympic Medal Coach.

Sporting positions
Preceded by Dennis Pursley	Head Coach of British Swimming -	Succeeded by Incumbent
