= Barry Prime =

British swimmer

Personal information
- Born: 15 July 1954 (age 71)

Sport
- Sport: Swimming

Barry Prime (born 15 July 1954) is a British former swimmer. He competed in two events at the 1972 Summer Olympics.
