= Dave McNulty =

British swimming coach

David McNulty (born 1970) has been the National Lead Coach at British Swimming’s National Centre Bath, Somerset during the last 3 Olympic Games cycles. He briefly served in an interim capacity as British Swimming’s head coach in 2012. British Swimming fields Great Britain’s Olympic Swim Team. McNulty has coached several of Team Great Britain’s swimmers to Olympic medals. He was a 2012 joint winner of the British Swimming Association Award for Coaching Excellence.

== Career ==
A former competitive swimmer born in County Durham, McNulty coached Great Britain’s Joanne Jackson (swimmer) to an Olympic bronze medal at the 2008 Summer Olympics in Beijing and Britain’s Michael Jamieson to an Olympic silver medal at the 2012 Summer Olympics in London. He coached Jazz Carlin (2), Siobhan-Marie O'Connor (1) and Chris Walker-Hebborn (1) to 4 Olympic silver medals at the 2016 Summer Olympics in Rio de Janeiro.

== Honours and awards ==
David McNulty was awarded an MBE in the King's 2024 Birthday Honours.

He was awarded an Honorary Doctorate of the University (DUniv) by the University of Bath in January 2025. The award recognises McNulty's extensive experience and holistic approach to training as well as his contribution to the University of Bath's sporting culture during the 17 years he has been based on the campus.
