= Swimming at the 1972 Summer Olympics – Men's 100 metre breaststroke =

Men's 100 metre breaststroke at the Games of the XX Olympiad
- Venue: Olympia Schwimmhalle
- Date: 29 August 1972 (heats & semifinals); 30 August 1972 (final)
- Competitors: 44 from 30 nations
- Winning time: 1:04.94 WR

Medalists
1st place, gold medalist(s)		Nobutaka Taguchi	Japan
2nd place, silver medalist(s)		Tom Bruce	United States
3rd place, bronze medalist(s)		John Hencken	United States

The men's 100 metre breaststroke event at the 1972 Olympic Games took place between August 29 and August 30 in the Schwimmhalle, Olympiapark, München. This swimming event used the breaststroke. Because an Olympic size swimming pool is 50 metres long, this race consisted of two lengths of the pool.

== Results ==
=== Heats ===
==== Heat 1 ====
Rank	Athlete	Country	Time	Notes
1	Mark Chatfield	United States	1:05.89	
2	Bill Mahony	Canada	1:07.14	
3	Bernard Combet	France	1:08.08	
4	Paul Jarvie	Australia	1:09.26	
5	Sokhon Yi	Khmer Republic	1:11.00	
6	Edmondo Mingione	Italy	1:11.75	
7	Morkal Faruk	Turkey	1:13.86	

==== Heat 2 ====
Rank	Athlete	Country	Time	Notes
1	Nikolay Pankin	Soviet Union	1:07.31	
2	Robert Stoddart	Canada	1:08.44	
3	Malcolm O'Connell	Great Britain	1:09.33	
4	Sándor Szabó	Hungary	1:09.68	
5	Gustavo Salcedo	Mexico	1:10.17	
6	Jean-Pierre Dubey	Switzerland	1:10.31	
7	Cezary Śmiglak	Poland	1:10.53	

==== Heat 3 ====
Rank	Athlete	Country	Time	Notes
1	David Wilkie	Great Britain	1:06.35	
2	Tom Bruce	United States	1:06.45	
3	Klaus Katzur	East Germany	1:07.36	
4	Vladimir Kosinsky	Soviet Union	1:07.39	
5	Amman Jalmaani	Philippines	1:09.28	
6	Steffen Kriechbaum	Austria	1:09.87	
7	Bruno Bassoul	Lebanon	1:19.94	

==== Heat 4 ====
Rank	Athlete	Country	Time	Notes
1	Nobutaka Taguchi	Japan	1:06.07	
2	José Sylvio Fiolo	Brazil	1:06.23	
3	Rainer Hradetzky	East Germany	1:08.67	
4	Liam Ball	Ireland	1:09.68	
5	Andreas Hellmann	West Germany	1:10.13	
6	Karl Christian Koch	Denmark	1:11.27	
7	Piero Ferracuti	El Salvador	1:16.74	

==== Heat 5 ====
Rank	Athlete	Country	Time	Notes
1	John Hencken	United States	1:05.96	
2	Roger-Philippe Menu	France	1:08.63	
3	Mike Whitaker	Canada	1:08.86	
4	Felipe Muñoz	Mexico	1:08.95	
5	Pedro Balcells	Spain	1:09.37	
6	Alfredo Hunger	Peru	1:11.44	
7	Theodoros Koutoumanis	Greece	1:12.05	
8	Rudi Vingerhoets	Belgium	1:12.59	

==== Heat 6 ====
Rank	Athlete	Country	Time	Notes
1	Walter Kusch	West Germany	1:06.95	
2	Viktor Stulikov	Soviet Union	1:08.18	
3	Michael Günther	West Germany	1:08.93	
4	Osvaldo Boretto	Argentina	1:09.64	
5	János Tóth	Hungary	1:10.02	
6	Angel Chakarov	Bulgaria	1:10.34	
7	Paul Naisby	Great Britain	1:11.05	
8	Guðjón Guðmundsson	Iceland	1:11.11	

=== Semifinals ===
Semifinal 1

Rank	Athlete	Country	Time	Notes
1	John Hencken	United States	1:05.68	WR
2	José Sylvio Fiolo	Brazil	1:05.99	
3	Tom Bruce	United States	1:06.05	
4	Klaus Katzur	East Germany	1:06.82	
5	Bill Mahony	Canada	1:07.06	
6	Bernard Combet	France	1:07.76	
7	Robert Stoddart	Canada	1:08.61	
8	Rainer Hradetzky	East Germany	1:09.49	

Semifinal 2

Rank	Athlete	Country	Time	Notes
1	Nobutaka Taguchi	Japan	1:05.13	WR
2	Walter Kusch	West Germany	1:05.78	
3	Nikolay Pankin	Soviet Union	1:06.08	
4	Mark Chatfield	United States	1:06.08	
5	David Wilkie	Great Britain	1:06.25	
6	Viktor Stulikov	Soviet Union	1:06.66	
7	Vladimir Kosinsky	Soviet Union	1:07.08	
8	Roger-Philippe Menu	France	1:07.75	

=== Final ===
Rank	Athlete	Country	Time	Notes
1	Nobutaka Taguchi	Japan	1:04.94	WR
2	Tom Bruce	United States	1:05.43	
3	John Hencken	United States	1:05.61	
4	Mark Chatfield	United States	1:06.01	
5	Walter Kusch	West Germany	1:06.23	
6	José Sylvio Fiolo	Brazil	1:06.24	
7	Nikolay Pankin	Soviet Union	1:06.36	
8	David Wilkie	Great Britain	1:06.52	

Key: WR = World record
