= Swimming at the 1972 Summer Olympics – Men's 200 metre breaststroke =

Men's 200 metre breaststroke at the Games of the XX Olympiad
- Venue: Olympia Schwimmhalle
- Date: 2 September 1972 (heats & final)
- Competitors: 41 from 28 nations
- Winning time: 2:21.55 WR

Medalists
1st place, gold medalist(s)		John Hencken	United States
2nd place, silver medalist(s)		David Wilkie	Great Britain
3rd place, bronze medalist(s)		Nobutaka Taguchi	Japan

The men's 200 metre breaststroke event at the 1972 Olympic Games took place September 2. This swimming event used the breaststroke. Because an Olympic-size swimming pool is 50 metres long, this race consisted of four lengths of the pool.

== Results ==
=== Heats ===
Heat 1

Rank	Athlete	Country	Time	Note
1	Klaus Katzur	East Germany	2:26.32	Q
2	Bill Mahony	Canada	2:26.71	
3	Roger-Philippe Menu	France	2:30.05	
4	Guðjón Guðmundsson	Iceland	2:32.40	
5	Sokhon Yi	Khmer Republic	2:34.77	
6	János Tóth	Hungary	2:37.40	

Heat 2

Rank	Athlete	Country	Time	Note
1	Nobutaka Taguchi	Japan	2:23.45	Q
2	Felipe Muñoz	Mexico	2:25.99	Q
3	Pedro Balcells	Spain	2:29.29	
4	Robert Stoddart	Canada	2:30.08	
5	Cezary Śmiglak	Poland	2:34.51	
6	Morkal Faruk	Turkey	2:43.69	
7	Piero Ferracuti	El Salvador	2:45.73	

Heat 3

Rank	Athlete	Country	Time	Note
1	David Wilkie	Great Britain	2:24.54	Q
2	Walter Kusch	West Germany	2:26.43	Q
3	Steffen Kriechbaum	Austria	2:30.09	
4	Malcolm O'Connell	Great Britain	2:31.21	
5	Jean-Pierre Dubey	Switzerland	2:31.56	
6	Gustavo Salcedo	Mexico	2:32.81	
7	Osvaldo Boretto	Argentina	2:31.84	DSQ

Heat 4

Rank	Athlete	Country	Time	Note
1	Rick Colella	United States	2:25.40	Q
2	Vladimir Kosinsky	Soviet Union	2:28.00	
3	Angel Chakarov	Bulgaria	2:30.27	
4	Andreas Hellmann	West Germany	2:32.60	
5	Liam Ball	Ireland	2:33.47	
6	Nigel Johnson	Great Britain	2:34.37	
7	Karl Christian Koch	Denmark	2:38.47	

Heat 5

Rank	Athlete	Country	Time	Note
1	Igor Cherdakov	Soviet Union	2:26.21	Q
2	Brian Job	United States	2:26.91	
3	José Sylvio Fiolo	Brazil	2:30.21	
4	Rainer Hradetzky	East Germany	2:32.48	
5	Amman Jaalmani	Philippines	2:33.54	
6	Michele Di Pietro	Italy	2:36.49	

Heat 6

Rank	Athlete	Country	Time	Note
1	John Hencken	United States	2:24.88	Q
2	Nikolay Pankin	Soviet Union	2:26.71	
3	Paul Jarvie	Australia	2:27.83	
4	Mike Whitaker	Canada	2:33.47	
5	Rudi Vingerhoets	Belgium	2:36.89	
6	Gregor Betz	West Germany	2:36.96	
7	Alfredo Hunger	Peru	2:37.20	
8	Alejandro Cabrera	El Salvador	2:56.60	

=== Final ===
Rank	Athlete	Country	Time	Notes
1	John Hencken	United States	2:21.55	WR
2	David Wilkie	Great Britain	2:23.67	
3	Nobutaka Taguchi	Japan	2:23.88	
4	Rick Colella	United States	2:24.28	
5	Felipe Muñoz	Mexico	2:26.44	
6	Walter Kusch	West Germany	2:26.55	
7	Igor Cherdakov	Soviet Union	2:27.15	
8	Klaus Katzur	East Germany	2:27.44	

Key: WR = World record
