= Swimming at the 1973 World Aquatics Championships – Men's 100 metre breaststroke =

Men's 100 metre breaststroke at the 1973 World Aquatics Championships
- Dates: September 4, 1973
- Competitors: 32 from 25 nations
- Winning time: 1:04.02 WR

Medalists
gold medal	John Hencken	United States
silver medal	Mikhail Khryukin	Soviet Union
bronze medal	Nobutaka Taguchi	Japan

The men's 100 metre breaststroke competition of the swimming events at the 1973 World Aquatics Championships took place on September 4.

== Records ==
Prior to the competition, the existing world and championship records were as follows.

World record	Nobutaka Taguchi (JPN)	1:04.94	Munich, West Germany	30 August 1972
Competition record	N/A	N/A	N/A	N/A

The following records were established during the competition:

Date	Event	Name	Nationality	Time	Record
4 September	Heat 1	Rick Colella	United States	1:06.72	CR
4 September	Heat 3	Nikolai Pankin	Soviet Union	1:06.10	CR
4 September	Heat 5	John Hencken	United States	1:04.35	WR
4 September	Final	John Hencken	United States	1:04.02	WR

== Results ==
=== Heats ===
32 swimmers participated in 5 heats. The eight fastest times qualified for the final.

Rank	Heat	Lane	Name	Nationality	Time	Notes
1	5	-	John Hencken	United States	1:04.35	Q, WR
2	5	-	Nobutaka Taguchi	Japan	1:05.80	Q
3	3	-	Nikolai Pankin	Soviet Union	1:06.10	Q, CR
4	1	-	Rick Colella	United States	1:06.72	Q, CR
5	4	-	Mikhail Khryukin	Soviet Union	1:06.78	Q
6	2	-	David Wilkie	Great Britain	1:06.98	Q
7	3	-	Jürgen Glas	East Germany	1:07.32	Q
8	3	-	Nigel Cluer	Papua New Guinea	1:07.59	Q
9	4	-	Michael Günther	West Germany	1:07.77	
10	2	-	Bernard Combet	France	1:08.26	
11	4	-	Felipe Muñoz	Mexico	1:08.37	
12	1	-	Peter Hrdlitschka	Canada	1:08.62	
13	5	-	Pedro Balcells	Spain	1:08.88	
14	1	-	Ove Wisloff	Norway	1:09.49	
15	2	-	Paweł Dyrek	Poland	1:09.60	
16	5	-	Sándor Szabó	Hungary	1:09.63	
17	3	-	Alfredo Hunger	Peru	1:09.73	
18	5	-	Sérgio Pinto Ribeiro	Brazil	1:09.80	
19	3	-	Michael Creswick	Australia	1:09.81	
20	4	-	Ulrich Nitzsche	East Germany	1:09.87	
21	2	-	Gustavo Lozano	Mexico	1:09.92	
22	5	-	Mel Zajac	Canada	1:09.97	
23	3	-	Zdravko Divjak	Yugoslavia	1:10.15	
24	1	-	Cezary Smiglak	Poland	1:10.57	
25	3	-	Giorgio Lalle	Italy	1:10.97	
26	1	-	Steffen Kriechbaum	Austria	1:11.06	
27	4	-	Angel Chakarov	Bulgaria	1:11.29	
28	4	-	Tuomo Kerola	Finland	1:12.37	
29	2	-	Carlos Nazario	Puerto Rico	1:13.33	
30	4	-	Faruk Morkal	Turkey	1:14.03	
31	2	-	Orlando Catinchi	Puerto Rico	1:14.50	
32	1	-	H. Ashfin	Iran	1:16.20	

=== Final ===
The results of the final are below.

Rank	Lane	Name	Nationality	Time	Notes
1st place, gold medalist(s)	-	John Hencken	United States	1:04.02	WR
2nd place, silver medalist(s)	-	Mikhail Khryukin	Soviet Union	1:04.61	ER
3rd place, bronze medalist(s)	-	Nobutaka Taguchi	Japan	1:05.61	
4	-	David Wilkie	Great Britain	1:05.74	CWR
5	-	Nikolai Pankin	Soviet Union	1:06.55	
6	-	Rick Colella	United States	1:06.69	
7	-	Jürgen Glas	East Germany	1:07.41	
8	-	Nigel Cluer	Papua New Guinea	1:08.12	
