= Swimming at the 1976 Summer Olympics – Men's 200 metre breaststroke =

Men's 200 metre breaststroke at the Games of the XXI Olympiad
- Venue: Olympic Pool, Montreal
- Date: 24 July 1976 (heats & final)
- Competitors: 29 from 19 nations
- Winning time: 2:15.11 WR

Medalists
1st place, gold medalist(s)		David Wilkie	Great Britain
2nd place, silver medalist(s)		John Hencken	United States
3rd place, bronze medalist(s)		Rick Colella	United States

The men's 200 metre breaststroke event for the 1976 Summer Olympics was held in Montreal. The event took place on 24 July.

== Heats ==
Heat 1

Rank	Athlete	Country	Time	Notes
1	Graham Smith	Canada	2:22.24	Q
2	Arvydas Juozaitis	Soviet Union	2:22.59	Q
3	Anders Norling	Sweden	2:24.61	
4	Peter Lang	West Germany	2:24.96	
5	Tuomo Kerola	Finland	2:25.87	
6	Julio Abreu	Paraguay	2:35.22	
-	Sérgio Pinto Ribeiro	Brazil	-	DQ

Heat 2

Rank	Athlete	Country	Time	Notes
1	Rick Colella	United States	2:21.08	Q, OR
2	Nikolay Pankin	Soviet Union	2:22.82	Q
3	Giorgio Lalle	Italy	2:23.63	
4	David Leigh	Great Britain	2:25.58	
5	Tateki Shinya	Japan	2:26.16	
6	Gustavo Lozano	Mexico	2:31.89	
-	Carlos Nazario	Puerto Rico	-	DQ

Heat 3

Rank	Athlete	Country	Time	Notes
1	John Hencken	United States	2:21.23	Q
2	Walter Kusch	West Germany	2:22.95	Q
3	Nobutaka Taguchi	Japan	2:24.12	
4	Dave Heinbuch	Canada	2:25.29	
5	Steffen Kriechbaum	Austria	2:25.73	
6	Paul Jarvie	Australia	2:30.15	
7	Henrique Vicêncio	Portugal	2:41.97	

Heat 4

Rank	Athlete	Country	Time	Notes
1	David Wilkie	Great Britain	2:18.29	Q, OR
2	Charles Keating	United States	2:22.22	Q
3	Aigars Kudis	Soviet Union	2:23.45	
4	Ove Wisløff	Norway	2:23.49	
5	Orlando Catinchi	Puerto Rico	2:26.27	
6	Cezary Śmiglak	Poland	2:27.41	
7	Zdravko Divjak	Yugoslavia	2:34.07	
-	Paul Naisby	Great Britain	-	DQ

== Final ==
Rank	Athlete	Country	Time	Notes
1	David Wilkie	Great Britain	2:15.11	WR
2	John Hencken	United States	2:17.26	
3	Rick Colella	United States	2:19.20	
4	Graham Smith	Canada	2:19.42	
5	Charles Keating	United States	2:20.79	
6	Arvydas Juozaitis	Soviet Union	2:21.87	
7	Nikolay Pankin	Soviet Union	2:22.21	
8	Walter Kusch	West Germany	2:22.36	
