= Swimming at the 1976 Summer Olympics – Men's 100 metre breaststroke =

Men's 100 metre breaststroke at the Games of the XXI Olympiad
- Venue: Olympic Pool, Montreal
- Date: 19 July 1976 (heats and semifinals); 20 July 1976 (final)
- Competitors: 32 from 22 nations
- Winning time: 1:03.11 WR

Medalists
| 1st place, gold medalist(s) | | John Hencken | United States |
| 2nd place, silver medalist(s) | | David Wilkie | Great Britain |
| 3rd place, bronze medalist(s) | | Arvydas Juozaitis | Soviet Union |

The men's 100 metre breaststroke event for the 1976 Summer Olympics was held at the Olympic Pool, Montreal. The event took place on 19 and 20 July.

== Heats ==
Heat 1

| Rank | Athlete | Country | Time | Notes |
|---|---|---|---|---|
| 1 | Duncan Goodhew | Great Britain | 1:04.92 | Q, OR |
| 2 | Nikolay Pankin | Soviet Union | 1:05.38 | Q |
| 3 | Ove Wisløff | Norway | 1:06.85 | |
| 4 | Tateki Shinya | Japan | 1:07.59 | |
| 5 | Cezary Śmiglak | Poland | 1:08.02 | |
| 6 | Mel Zajac | Canada | 1:08.52 | |
| 7 | Campari Knoepffler | Nicaragua | 1:15.18 | |

Heat 2

| Rank | Athlete | Country | Time | Notes |
|---|---|---|---|---|
| 1 | Arvydas Juozaitis | Soviet Union | 1:04.78 | Q, OR |
| 2 | Peter Lang | West Germany | 1:05.25 | Q |
| 3 | Walter Kusch | West Germany | 1:05.88 | Q |
| 4 | Steffen Kriechbaum | Austria | 1:08.09 | |
| 5 | Tuomo Kerola | Finland | 1:08.22 | |
| 6 | Carlos Nazario | Puerto Rico | 1:08.33 | |
| 7 | Henrique Vicêncio | Portugal | 1:13.55 | |

Heat 3

| Rank | Athlete | Country | Time | Notes |
|---|---|---|---|---|
| 1 | David Leigh | Great Britain | 1:06.12 | Q |
| 2 | Giorgio Lalle | Italy | 1:06.38 | Q |
| 3 | Anders Norling | Sweden | 1:06.52 | |
| 4 | Vladimir Dementyev | Soviet Union | 1:06.96 | |
| 5 | Gustavo Lozano | Mexico | 1:08.89 | |

Heat 4

| Rank | Athlete | Country | Time | Notes |
|---|---|---|---|---|
| 1T | David Wilkie | Great Britain | 1:05.19 | Q |
| 1T | Graham Smith | Canada | 1:05.19 | Q |
| 3 | Larry Dowler | United States | 1:05.32 | Q |
| 4 | Sérgio Ribeiro | Brazil | 1:06.07 | Q |
| 5 | Pedro Balcells | Spain | 1:07.98 | |
| 6 | Bruce Knowles | Bahamas | 1:11.65 | |

Heat 5

| Rank | Athlete | Country | Time | Notes |
|---|---|---|---|---|
| 1 | John Hencken | United States | 1:03.88 | Q, =WR |
| 2 | Nobutaka Taguchi | Japan | 1:04.65 | Q |
| 3 | Chris Woo | United States | 1:05.39 | Q |
| 4 | José Sylvio Fiolo | Brazil | 1:06.18 | Q |
| 5 | Paul Jarvie | Australia | 1:06.22 | Q |
| 6 | Zdravko Divjak | Yugoslavia | 1:08.31 | |
| 7 | Fred Nevin | Canada | 1:09.93 | |

== Semifinals ==
Heat 1

| Rank | Athlete | Country | Time | Notes |
|---|---|---|---|---|
| 1 | David Wilkie | Great Britain | 1:04.29 | Q |
| 2 | Giorgio Lalle | Italy | 1:04.35 | Q |
| 3 | Duncan Goodhew | Great Britain | 1:04.59 | Q |
| 4 | Chris Woo | United States | 1:04.86 | Q |
| 5 | Larry Dowler | United States | 1:05.19 | |
| 6 | Nobutaka Taguchi | Japan | 1:05.69 | |
| 7 | José Sylvio Fiolo | Brazil | 1:06.38 | |
| 8 | Sérgio Pinto Ribeiro | Brazil | 1:06.69 | |

Heat 2

| Rank | Athlete | Country | Time | Notes |
|---|---|---|---|---|
| 1 | John Hencken | United States | 1:03.62 | Q, WR |
| 2 | Graham Smith | Canada | 1:03.92 | Q |
| 3 | Walter Kusch | West Germany | 1:04.28 | Q |
| 4 | Arvydas Juozaitis | Soviet Union | 1:04.76 | Q |
| 5 | Peter Lang | West Germany | 1:05.19 | |
| 6 | Nikolay Pankin | Soviet Union | 1:05.59 | |
| 7 | David Leigh | Great Britain | 1:05.91 | |
| 8 | Paul Jarvie | Australia | 1:06.20 | |

== Final ==
| Rank | Athlete | Country | Time | Notes |
|---|---|---|---|---|
| 1 | John Hencken | United States | 1:03.11 | WR |
| 2 | David Wilkie | Great Britain | 1:03.43 | |
| 3 | Arvydas Juozaitis | Soviet Union | 1:04.23 | |
| 4 | Graham Smith | Canada | 1:04.26 | |
| 5 | Giorgio Lalle | Italy | 1:04.37 | |
| 6 | Walter Kusch | West Germany | 1:04.38 | |
| 7 | Duncan Goodhew | Great Britain | 1:04.66 | |
| 8 | Chris Woo | United States | 1:05.13 | |
