= Swimming at the 1972 Summer Olympics – Men's 4 × 100 metre medley relay =

Men's 4 × 100 metre medley relay at the Games of the XX Olympiad
- Venue: Olympia Schwimmhalle
- Date: 4 September 1972 (heats & final)
- Competitors: 76 from 17 nations
- Teams: 17
- Winning time: 3:48.16 WR

Medalists
1st place, gold medalist(s)		Mike Stamm, Tom Bruce, Mark Spitz, Jerry Heidenreich, Mitch Ivey*, John Hencken*, Gary Hall*, David Fairbank*	United States
2nd place, silver medalist(s)		Roland Matthes, Klaus Katzur, Hartmut Flöckner, Lutz Unger	East Germany
3rd place, bronze medalist(s)		Erik Fish, Bill Mahony, Bruce Robertson, Bob Kasting, Bill Kennedy*; *Indicates the swimmer only competed in the preliminary heats.	Canada

The men's 4 × 100 metre medley relay event at the 1972 Olympic Games took place on 4 September 1972. This swimming event uses medley swimming as a relay. Because an Olympic size swimming pool is 50 metres long, each of the four swimmers completed two lengths of the pool, each using a different stroke. The first on each team used the backstroke, the second used the breaststroke, the third used the butterfly stroke, and the final swimmer used freestyle (restricted to not allow any of the first three strokes to be used, though nearly all swimmers use front crawl regardless).

The first swimmer must touch the wall before the next can leave the starting block, and so forth; timing of the starts is thus important.

== Results ==
=== Heats ===
Heat 1

Place	Swimmers	Time	Notes
1	Igor Grivennikov, Viktor Stulikov, Viktor Sharygin, Viktor Aboimov (URS)	3:56.57	
2	Bill Kennedy, Bill Mahony, Bruce Robertson, Bob Kasting (CAN)	3:57.05	
3	László Cseh Sr., Sándor Szabó, András Hargitay, István Szentirmay (HUN)	3:59.86	
4	Jean-Paul Berjeau, Roger-Philippe Menu, Alain Mosconi, Michel Rousseau (FRA)	4:00.50	
5	José Joaquín Santibáñez, Felipe Muñoz, Hugo Valencia, Guillermo García (MEX)	4:05.61	

Heat 2

Place	Swimmers	Time	Notes
1	Roland Matthes, Klaus Katzur, Hartmut Flöckner, Lutz Unger (GDR)	3:55.23	
2	Rômulo Arantes Filho, José Sylvio Fiolo, Sérgio Waismann, José Roberto Aranha (BRA)	3:58.56	
3	Tadashi Honda (1:00.23) NR, Nobutaka Taguchi, Yasuhiro Komazaki, Jiro Sasaki (JPN)	3:59.55	NR
4	Andreas Weber, Walter Kusch, Lutz Stoklasa, Klaus Steinbach (FRG)	4:00.56	
5	Enrique Melo, Pedro Balcells, Arturo Lang-Lenton, Jorge Comas (ESP)	4:03.73	
6	Gerardo Rosario, Amman Jalmaani, Carlos Brosas, Luis Ayesa (PHI)	4:13.62	

Heat 3

Place	Swimmers	Time	Notes
1	Mitch Ivey, John Hencken, Gary Hall, David Fairbank (USA)	3:51.98	
2	Colin Cunningham, David Wilkie, John Mills, Malcolm Windeatt (GBR)	3:58.97	
3	Brad Cooper, Paul Jarvie, Neil Rogers, Mike Wenden (AUS)	4:00.16	
4	Anders Sandberg, Gunnar Larsson, Hans Ljungberg, Anders Bellbring (SWE)	4:06.67	
5	Piotr Dłucik, Cezary Śmiglak, Andrzej Chudziński, Zbigniew Pacelt (POL)	4:07.87	
6	Sarun Van, Sokhon Yi, Chhay-Kheng Nhem, Samnang Prak (KHM)	4:20.71	

=== Final ===
Place	Swimmers	Time	Notes
1st place, gold medalist(s)	Mike Stamm, Tom Bruce, Mark Spitz, Jerry Heidenreich (USA)	3:48.16	WR
2nd place, silver medalist(s)	Roland Matthes, Klaus Katzur, Hartmut Flöckner, Lutz Unger (GDR)	3:52.12	
3rd place, bronze medalist(s)	Erik Fish, Bill Mahony, Bruce Robertson, Bob Kasting (CAN)	3:52.26	
4	Igor Grivennikov, Nikolay Pankin, Viktor Sharygin, Vladimir Bure (URS)	3:53.26	
5	Rômulo Arantes Filho, José Sylvio Fiolo, Sérgio Waismann, José Roberto Aranha (BRA)	3:57.89	
6	Tadashi Honda (59.83) NR, Nobutaka Taguchi, Yasuhiro Komazaki, Jiro Sasaki (JPN)	3:58.23	NR
7	Colin Cunningham, David Wilkie, John Mills, Malcolm Windeatt (GBR)	3:58.82	
8	László Cseh Sr., Sándor Szabó, István Szentirmay, Attila Császári (HUN)	3:59.07	
