= Swimming at the 1976 Summer Olympics – Men's 4 × 100 metre medley relay =

Men's 4 × 100 metre medley relay at the Games of the XXI Olympiad
- Venue: Olympic Pool
- Date: 22 July 1976 (heats & final)
- Competitors: 68 from 14 nations
- Teams: 14
- Winning time: 3:42.22 WR

Medalists
1st place, gold medalist(s)		John Naber, John Hencken, Matt Vogel, Jim Montgomery, Peter Rocca*, Chris Woo*, Joe Bottom*, Jack Babashoff*	United States
2nd place, silver medalist(s)		Steve Pickell, Graham Smith, Clay Evans, Gary MacDonald, Bruce Robertson*	Canada
3rd place, bronze medalist(s)		Klaus Steinbach, Walter Kusch, Michael Kraus, Peter Nocke, Peter Lang*, Dirk Braunleder*; *Indicates the swimmer only competed in the preliminary heats.	West Germany

The men's 4 × 100m medley relay event for the 1976 Summer Olympics was held in the Canadian city of Montreal on 22 July 1976. The United States used two different foursomes in the heats and final - each combination won the race and broke the world record.

== Results ==
=== Heats ===
Heat 1

Place	Swimmers	Time	Notes
1	Steve Pickell, Graham Smith, Bruce Robertson, Gary MacDonald (CAN)	3:50.61	
2	Gary Abraham, Duncan Goodhew, John Mills, Kevin Burns (GBR)	3:52.35	
3	Mark Kerry, Paul Jarvie, Neil Rogers, Peter Coughlan (AUS)	3:53.98	
4	Carlos Berrocal, Carlos Nazario, John Daly, Fernando Cañales (PUR)	3:58.62	
5	Mikael Brandén, Anders Norling, Bengt Gingsjö, Dan Larsson (SWE)	3:58.82	
6	Ignacio Álvarez, Gustavo Lozano, José Luis Prado, Guillermo García (MEX)	4:02.69	

Heat 2

Place	Swimmers	Time	Notes
1	Peter Rocca, Chris Woo, Joe Bottom, Jack Babashoff (USA)	3:47.28	WR
2	Klaus Steinbach, Peter Lang, Michael Kraus, Dirk Braunleder (FRG)	3:51.57	
3	Igor Omelchenk'o, Nikolay Pankin, Yevgeny Seredin, Andrey Bogdanov (URS)	3:53.64	
4	Tadashi Honda, Nobutaka Taguchi, Hideaki Hara, Tsuyoshi Yanagidate (JPN)	3:56.18	NR
5	Enrico Bisso, Giorgio Lalle, Paolo Barelli, Marcello Guarducci (ITA)	3:57.30	
6	Santiago Esteva, Pedro Balcells, Mario Lloret, Jorge Comas (ESP)	3:58.22	
7	Ramón Volcan, Glen Sochasky, Luis Goicoechea, Andrés Arraez (VEN)	4:05.07	
8	Paulo Frischknecht, Henrique Vicêncio, José Pereira, António de Melo (POR)	4:20.84	

=== Final ===
Rank	Lane	Nation	Swimmers	Time	Notes
1st place, gold medalist(s)	4	United States	John Naber (55.89); John Hencken (1:02.50); Matt Vogel (54.26); Jim Montgomery (49.57)	3:42.22	WR
2nd place, silver medalist(s)	5	Canada	Steve Pickell (57.58); Graham Smith (1:02.59); Clay Evans (54.43); Gary MacDonald (51.34)	3:45.94	
3rd place, bronze medalist(s)	3	West Germany	Klaus Steinbach (57.82); Walter Kusch (1:03.74); Michael Kraus (55.38); Peter Nocke (50.35)	3:47.29	
4	6	Great Britain	James Carter (59.60); David Wilkie (1:02.81); John Mills (55.70); Brian Brinkley (51.45)	3:49.56	
5	2	Soviet Union	Igor Omelchenko (59.10); Arvydas Juozaitis (1:04.41); Evgeniy Seredin (56.19); Andrey Krylov (50.20)	3:49.90	
6	7	Australia	Mark Kerry (57.94); Paul Jarvie (1:05.70); Neil Rogers (55.50); Peter Coughlan (52.40)	3:51.54	
7	8	Italy	Enrico Bisso (1:00.25); Giorgio Lalle (1:04.33); Paolo Barelli (1:06.38); Marcello Guarducci (51.96)	3:52.92	
8	1	Japan	Tadashi Honda (1:01.28); Nobutaka Taguchi (1:04.15); Hideaki Hara (55.70); Tsuyoshi Yanagidate (53.61)	3:54.74	
