= Puerto Rico at the 1976 Summer Olympics =

- IOC code: PUR
- NOC: Puerto Rico Olympic Committee

in Montreal
- Competitors: 80 in 12 sports
- Flag bearer: Téofilo Colón
- Medals Ranked 37th: Gold 0 Silver 0 Bronze 1 Total 1

Summer Olympics appearances (overview)
- 1948; 1952; 1956; 1960; 1964; 1968; 1972; 1976; 1980; 1984; 1988; 1992; 1996; 2000; 2004; 2008; 2012; 2016; 2020; 2024

Puerto Rico competed at the 1976 Summer Olympics in Montreal, Quebec, Canada. 80 competitors, 73 men and 7 women, took part in 74 events in 12 sports.

== Medalists ==
=== Bronze ===
- Orlando Maldonado — Boxing, Men's Light Flyweight (– 48 kg)

== Archery ==
In the second time the nation competed in archery at the Olympics, Puerto Rico entered one man and one woman. Maria Medina came in last place in the women's competition even as Edgardo Berdeguer beat considerably the 55th-place finish Puerto Rico's only archer in 1972 earned.

Women's Individual Competition:

- Maria Medina – 1993 points (→ 27th place)

Men's Individual Competition:

- Edgardo Berdeguer – 2200 points (→ 31st place)

== Athletics ==
Men's 800 metres

- Jorge Ortiz

- Heat — 1:51.38 (→ did not advance)

Men's 4x400 metres Relay

- Pedro Ferrer, Iván Mangual, Julio Ferrer, and Jorge Ortiz

- Heat — 3:06.08 (→ did not advance)

Men's 400m Hurdles

- Julio Ferrer

- Heats — 52.45s
- Semi Final — 51.04s (→ did not advance)

Men's Marathon

- José de Jesus — 2:19:34 (→ 23rd place)
- Víctor Serrano — 2:34:59 (→ 53rd place)

== Basketball ==
Men's team competition

- Preliminary round (group B):

- Lost to Yugoslavia (63-84)
- Lost to United States (94-95)
- Lost to Czechoslovakia (83-89)
- Lost to Italy (81-95)
- Defeated Egypt (20-0) bb.

- Classification Matches:

- 9th/11th place: Defeated Japan (111-91)
- 9th/10th place: Defeated Mexico (89-84) → Ninth place

- Team roster

- Butch Lee
- Michael Vicens
- Neftali Rivera
- Luis Brignoni
- Rubén Rodríguez
- Roberto Alvarez
- Héctor Blondet
- Jimmy Thordsen
- Mariano Ortíz
- Teófilo Cruz
- Raymond Dalmau
- Earl Brown

- Head coach: Tom Nissalke

== Boxing ==
Men's Light Flyweight (– 48 kg)

- Orlando Maldonado → Bronze Medal

- First Round – Defeated Lucky Mutale (ZAM), walk-over
- Second Round – Defeated Brendan Dunne (IRL), KO-1
- Quarterfinals – Defeated Héctor Patri (ARG), 5:0
- Semifinals – Lost to Jorge Hernández (CUB), 0:5

Men's Flyweight (– 51 kg)

- Julio Guzman

Men's Bantamweight (– 54 kg)

- Alejandro Silva

Men's Featherweight (– 57 kg)

- Carlos Calderon

Men's Lightweight (– 60 kg)

- Roberto Andino

Men's Light-Welterweight (– 63.5 kg)

- Ismael Martínez

Men's Welterweight (– 67 kg)

- Carlos Santos

Men's Light-Middleweight (– 71 kg)

- Wilfredo Guzman

Men's Middleweight (– 75 kg)

- Carlos Betancourt

Men's Light-Heavyweight (– 81 kg)

- José Rosa

== Fencing ==
Four fencers, three men and one woman, represented Puerto Rico in 1976.

Men's foil

- José Samalot

Men's épée

- Gilberto Peña
- Rubén Hernández

Women's foil

- Dinorah Enríquez

== Swimming ==
Men's 100 metres Freestyle

- Fernando Cañales

Men's 200 metres Freestyle

- Francisco Cañales

Men's 400 metres Freestyle

- Francisco Cañales

Men's 100 metres Backstroke

- Carlos Berrocal

Men's 200 metres Backstroke

- Carlos Berrocal

Men's 100 metres Breaststroke

- Carlos Nazario

Men's 200 metres Breaststroke

- Orlando Catinchi
- Carlos Nazario

Men's 100 metres Butterfly

- Arnaldo Pérez
- John Daly

Men's 200 metres Butterfly

- John Daly

Men's 400 metres Individual Medley

- José-Ricardo de Jesús

Men's 4×200 metres Freestyle Relay

- Fernando Cañales
- José-Ricardo de Jesús
- Arnaldo Pérez
- Francisco Cañales

Men's 4×100 metres Medley Relay

- Carlos Berrocal
- Carlos Nazario
- John Daly
- Fernando Cañales

Women's 100 metres Freestyle

- Jane Fayer

Women's 200 metres Freestyle

- Jane Fayer

Women's 400 metres Freestyle

- Diana Hatler

Women's 800 metres Freestyle

- Diana Hatler

Women's 100 metres Breaststroke

- Angela López

Women's 200 metres Breaststroke

- Angela López

Women's 100 metres Butterfly

- María Mock

Women's 200 metres Butterfly

- María Mock

Women's 4×100 metres Freestyle Relay

- Diana Hatler
- Angela López
- María Mock
- Jane Fayer

Women's 4×100 metres Medley Relay

- Diana Hatler
- Angela López
- María Mock
- Jane Fayer
