= Dave Fairbank =

American swimmer (born 1954)

Personal information
- Full name: David William Fairbank
- Nickname: "Dave"
- National team: United States
- Born: December 19, 1954 (age 71) Sacramento, California, U.S.
- Education: Rio Americano High School ('73); Stanford University ('77)
- Height: 6 ft 4 in (1.93 m)
- Weight: 159 lb (72 kg)

Sport
- Sport: Swimming
- Strokes: Freestyle
- Club: Arden Hills Swim Club
- College team: Stanford University
- Coach: Emery Haworth (Rio Americano); Linda Burton (Rio Americano); Sherm Chavoor (Arden Hills); James Gaughran (Stanford)

David William Fairbank (born December 19, 1954) is an American former swimmer, who competed for Stanford University and participated in the 1972 Munich Olympics, where he swam in the preliminaries for the U.S. 4x100 freestyle and 4x100 medley relay teams that won gold medals in the finals. He did not receive gold medals, however, as the 1972 rules gave medals only to the team members that swam in the final heat. Fairbank specialized in sprint freestyle and butterfly events.

== Early swimming and family ==
David Fairbank was born December 19, 1954 in Sacramento, California to government official William Fairbank, and substitute teacher Elizabeth Fairbank, known as Betty. He was one of five male siblings, who all excelled as swimming competitors, and competed and trained with Sacramento's Arden Hills Swim Club in High School. After High School, Dave's younger brother Jim was a standout swimmer at Arizona State, John attended UCLA, Tom swam for Brigham Young, and Mike swam for the University of Colorado.

=== Rio Americano High ===
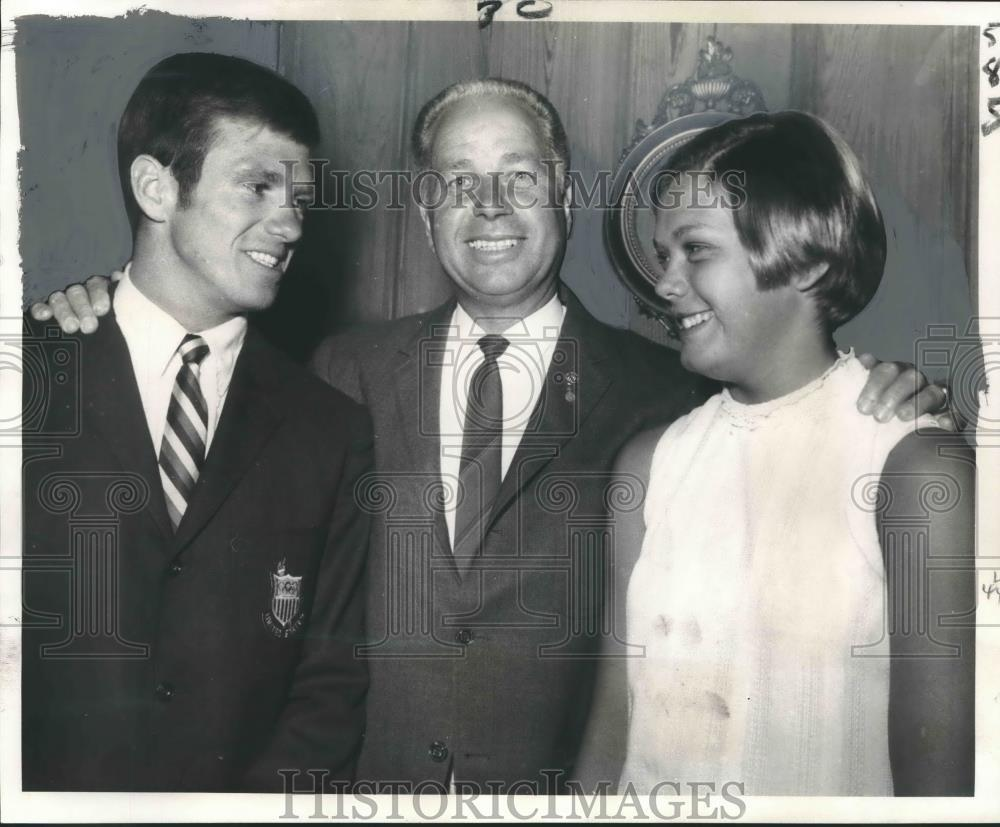
(L to R) Arden Hills swimmers Mike Burton, Coach Sherm Chavoor, D. Meyer, 69

Fairbank's light frame and a height of 6' 4", when combined with years of speed and endurance training provided a framework for developing speed in the freestyle and butterfly strokes. Graduating in 1973, Dave attended Rio Americano High School outside Sacramento, where he swam for Head Coach Emery Haworth, and beginning in 1972 for Head Coach Linda Burton, the wife of Olympian Mike Burton, and Assistant Coach Jim Delacey. In addition to swimming he played varsity High School water polo and basketball, though he prioritized swimming as a primary sport.

=== Arden Hills ===
In club swimming, like several other Rio Americano swimmers, Fairbank competed and trained with the outstanding program at Sacramento's Arden Hills Swim Club under founder and Hall of Fame Coach Sherm Chavoor, whose swimming products included seven-time 1972 Olympic gold medalist Mark Spitz. Chavoor's training focused on long workouts that featured intense and repeated intervals to build endurance. Chavoor counselled swimmers in their technique, though he was not a stickler that required perfect form.

== 1972 Munich Olympics ==
As a High School Senior, Fairbank represented the United States at the 1972 Summer Olympics in Munich, Germany under Head Olympic Coach Peter Daland of USC, assisted by James Counsilman of Indiana and Don Gambril who would later coach the University of Alabama . In individual events, he swam a 52.61 in the 100-meter freestyle which did not qualify him to advance. More successful in relay events, he swam for the winning U.S. teams in the preliminary heats of the men's 4×100-meter freestyle relay and 4×100-meter medley relay, but did not receive a medal for either event as he did not swim in the final heat. Though he did not swim in the finals, the U.S. finals team in the 4x100 meter freestyle relay on August 28, 1972 posted a world record time of 3.28.84 to win the gold, and the men's 4x100 meter medley relay on September 4, 1972 posted an Olympic record time of 3:51.98 to also take the gold. Under the Olympic rules in effect in 1972, swimmers who competed in the qualifying heats, but not the final of relay events, were not eligible to receive a medal. This rule has been overturned in later years.

Subsequent to the 1972 Olympics, in May of his Senior year at Rio Americano, Fairbank broke the 100-yard CIF Section freestyle record with a time of 46.0 at the Section Championships at Stockton, California, and equaled his season best with a 20.7 in the 50-yard freestyle. He swam the freestyle anchor leg for Rio Americano's 200-yard medley relay team that set a record of 1:39.5.

=== Stanford University ===
Coach Gaughran '60

Fairbank attended Stanford University, from around 1973-1977 where he competed and trained under Head Coach James Gaughran, who coached Stanford from around 1960-1980. A very strong program during Fairbank's tenure, the swimmers on Fairbank's Stanford teams included Olympic freestyle gold medalist Mike Bruner, who had also swum for Arden Hills and gold medal breaststroker John Hencken. While a Sophomore at Stanford in 1975, Fairbank held the national record in the 50-yard freestyle with a time of 20.63, and was rated third nationally in the 100-yard freestyle with a time of 45.94. In his Junior year Fairbank suffered from strep throat, and did not make the 1976 Olympic team. By 1977, he had lowered his times to 20.18 in the 50-yard and 44.33 in the 100-yard events, both Stanford school records. An All-American at Stanford, Fairbank won a silver medal in the 50-meter freestyle at the 1976 NCAA Championships, though he would have strongly preferred the gold.

Continuing to compete at a high level years after graduating Stanford, at the 1986 FINA World Championships in Madrid, Spain he swam the 200-meter backstroke in a time of 2:04.03. Later,at the 1988-1989 FINA Swimming World Cup, he swam the 200-meter butterfly in a time of 2:08.63.

== See also ==
- List of Stanford University people
- World record progression 4 × 100 metres freestyle relay
