= Fernando Canales (swimmer) =

Puerto Rican swimmer (born 1959)

Personal information
- Full name: Fernando J. Canales
- National team: Puerto Rico
- Born: November 2, 1959 (age 66) Guaynabo, Puerto Rico
- Height: 1.82 m (6 ft 0 in)
- Weight: 80 kg (176 lb)

Sport
- Sport: Swimming
- Strokes: Freestyle
- College team: University of Michigan
Medal record
Men's swimming
Representing Puerto Rico
Pan American Games
Silver medal – second place	1979 San Juan	100m Freestyle
Silver medal – second place	1983 Caracas	100m Freestyle
Bronze medal – third place	1979 San Juan	4x100m Medley

Fernando J. Canales (born November 2, 1959, in Guaynabo, Puerto Rico) is a former freestyle swimmer from Puerto Rico and swimming coach. Up until the Beijing Olympics in 2008, he was the head assistant coach for men's swimming & diving at his alma mater, The University of Michigan, and also for the USA National Championship Team, Club Wolverine, home for numerous Olympic champions and medalists. He is a member of the USA Swimming's International Relations Committee as well as the United States' technical representative for the Amateur Swimming Union of the Americas (ASUA/UANA). He is an assistant director of development for The University of Michigan Athletic Department. He then was the head coach at Colgate University. In his first season at Colgate, the women's team took home the 2011 Patriot League Championship, and the men's team finished the meet in fifth place. In 2016 he coached his home country Puerto Rico at the Olympics in Rio. Currently he is the head coach for Pitchfork Aquatics and Puerto Rico.

His father is Francisco Canales Roman, from Toa Baja, Puerto Rico, and his mother is Carmen Alvarez Canales, from Mexico City D.F. Fernando has two brothers (swimmer Francisco—Harvard '78 and Stanford '82; Harry Noel—Michigan '87) and one sister (Sandra Lee—CMU '88 & Grand Valley State '89). He graduated from Colegio San Ignacio de Loyola (San Juan) in 1977 and was honored for civic service and athletic achievements with the symbolic key to the City of Guaynabo, Puerto Rico, in 1978.

He graduated in 1982 with a Bachelor of Science in physiology of exercise and a Bachelor of Arts in history and English from the University of Michigan. After his graduation he worked with legendary Olympic coaches Jon Urbanchek and Dick Kimball from 1982 to 1987 and helped the Wolverines reclaim the Big Ten Championship Title after a 24-year drought in March 1986. Canales was the head swimming and water polo coach at the University of California, Santa Cruz from 1990 to 1992, where he also taught classes within the Physical Education Department.

He became a national swimming champion at an early age by becoming the top-ranked 17 and under, 100 meter freestyler in the US in 1977 while training under Coach Brad Glenn in Huntsville, Alabama. Canales was ranked 25th in the world that very same year in the 100 Free. His triumphs brought him to the University of Michigan from 1977 to 1982. He excelled at the national and international level by winning All-America Awards in each of his four years of competition. He earned a total of 13 Big Ten Championship titles. Canales was the first swimmer in Big Ten Conference history to capture an individual title (100 yard freestyle) during his four years of competition while training under Head Olympic Coach Gus Stager and 1964 US Olympian Bill Farley.

Canales was a 100-meter freestyle finalist in the 1978 World Championships in West Berlin, Germany, earning a 5th place. He was the "first" Puerto Rican swimmer to final in the world championships along with Jesse "Cheyenne" Vassallo. He earned five gold medals and one silver medal during the 1978 Central American and Caribbean Games in Medellín, Colombia. He became the first Puerto Rican to win an individual medal in the Pan American Games by winning silver in the 100 meters free in 1979 (San Juan, Puerto Rico) and repeating that feat in 1983 (Caracas, Venezuela). He also won a bronze medal in the 4 x 100 meters medley relay in 1979.

Fernando became a national champion while representing Club Wolverine in 1986, when he won the 4 x 100 meter free relay alongside three other Wolverines, Joe Parker, Greg Varner and Dave Kerska. This was the fastest Club Relay in the World for that year. He won the 100 meter free gold medal during the Soviet Spartakiade National Championships in 1979. He won the 50 meter and 100 meter freestyle events during the Swedish and German World Cup events in 1983 and 1984. He won the Latin Cup in 1978, 1979 and 1981. He won sprint freestyle titles in Italy, Canada, Mexico, Brazil, Puerto Rico, The United States, Germany, Sweden, Dominican Republic and Guadeloupe.

Canales made three Olympic Teams: Montreal '76, Moscow '80 and Los Angeles '84). He was honored as the flag bearer for the Puerto Rican Olympic Team during the 1984 Summer Olympics opening and closing ceremonies in Los Angeles, 1984. Canales, a 13-time Big Ten Champion and 4 year All-America at Michigan, is featured in the book "Paths to the Olympics – Maize and Blue to Olympic Gold" by Marc Parrish, Colemar Press 1997.

He attributes his triumphs to the support of his mother, brothers and sister, the memory of his father, John Daly's tutelage, his teammates, and the coaches that helped him during his career: Kika, Julia, Mr. Tom Forte, Carlos Sala, Brad Glenn, Gus Stager, Bill Farley, Dick Kimball, Maggie Shook, Bob Bowman, Mona Nyheim and Jon Urbanchek. All of these coaches shared one thing in common: they participated in the Olympics or the Pan American Games, thus instilling the Olympic dream and the desire to rise to the level of competition from an early age.

Canales was inducted into the Puerto Rico Sports Hall of Fame with the class of 1993, which also included internationally famous sports personalities: Orlando "Peruchin" Cepeda, Carlos "Charlie" Passarell, Raymond Dalmau, Amado Morales and Osvaldo Gil. In addition, he was also inducted into the City of Bayamon, P.R., Sports Hall of Fame in 2009.

Fernando is married to Mona Nyheim-Canales, a Norwegian national swimming champion and Arizona Wildcat, she is the head assistant coach for Club Wolverine in Ann Arbor. They have two sons, Francisco Enrique Canales and Thor Bjorn Canales. Canales coached in Texas from 1992 to 2006 with the City of Richardson Swim team. He speaks five languages and has lived in Canada, Italy, Brazil, the United States and Puerto Rico. He is an active volunteer with the American Red Cross.

== See also ==
- List of Puerto Ricans
