= Robert Stoddard =

Robert Stoddard may refer to:

- Robert Stoddard, American musician in the band The Dogs D'Amour
- Bob Stoddard (Robert Lyle Stoddard, born 1957), Major League Baseball pitcher
- Robert Waring Stoddard (1906–1984), American businessman and one of the founders of the anti-communist John Birch Society

== See also ==
- Robert Stoddart (born 1950), Canadian swimmer
