= Divjak =

Divjak is a Serbo-Croatian surname. Notable people with the surname include:

- Blaženka Divjak (born 1967), Croatian mathematician and politician
- Boris Divjak (born 1972), macroeconomics consultant from Bosnia and Herzegovina
- Jovan Divjak (1937–2021), Bosnian general in the Bosnian army
- Zdravko Divjak (born 1956), Yugoslav swimmer
- Michael (Mico) Divjak (born 1960), Canadian insurance industry executive (retired)

== See also ==
- Divac, surname
- Divjakë, settlement in western Albania
