= Alejandro Cabrera =

Alejandro Cabrera may refer to:

- Alejandro Cabrera (footballer) (born 1992), Argentine central midfielder
- Alejandro Cabrera (swimmer), Salvadoran swimmer
