= Tom Bruce (swimmer) =

American swimmer (1952–2020)

- Bruce in his youth

Personal information
- Full name: Thomas Edwin Bruce
- Nickname: "Tom"
- National team: United States
- Born: April 17, 1952 Red Bluff, California, U.S.
- Died: April 9, 2020 (aged 67) Royal Oaks, California, U.S.
- Occupation: Hospital Administrator
- Height: 6 ft 0 in (1.83 m)
- Weight: 161 lb (73 kg)
- Spouse: Marilee

Sport
- Sport: Swimming
- Event: 100 breaststroke
- Strokes: Breaststroke
- Club: Santa Clara Swim Club
- College team: U. of California, Los Angeles
- Coach: George Haines (Santa Clara SC); Robert Horn (UCLA)
Medal record
Men's swimming
Representing the United States
Olympic Games
Gold medal – first place	1972 Munich	4x100 m medley relay
Silver medal – second place	1972 Munich	100 m breaststroke

Thomas Edwin Bruce (April 17, 1952 – April 9, 2020) was an American competitive swimmer, who competed for UCLA, a 1972 Munich Olympic champion, swimming the breaststroke leg in the 4x100-meter medley relay, and a former world record-holder.

Bruce was born April 17, 1952, in Red Bluff, California, where he grew up. A graduate of Marian A. Peterson High School in Sunnyvale, California, he trained and competed with the Santa Clara Swim Club under Hall of Fame Coach George Haines. From his Sophomore through his Senior year at Peterson High, he received All-American honors. Representing the Santa Clara Club, at a meet sponsored by the Sacramento Bee in June, 1968, Bruce won the 100-yard breaststroke event in an age-group record time of 1:02.8. At the Los Angeles Invitational in early August, 1970, at 16, Bruce won the 100-meter breaststroke with a time of 1:08.60.

== UCLA ==
He attended the University of California, Los Angeles (UCLA), from around 1970-1974, where he swam for the UCLA Bruins swimming and diving team in National Collegiate Athletic Association (NCAA) and PAC-8 Conference competition under Head Coach Robert "Bob" Horn. In his mid-collegiate career, Bruce had problems with his knees, a common injury among breaststrokers, which were treated by the UCLA trainer "Ducky Drake". At a high point in his collegiate career, in 1972, he won the 100-yard breaststroke Championship in NCAA collegiate competition, defeating rival and Santa Clara Club teammate Brian Job. That year, Bruce earned a third place finish in the 100-yard breast at the American Athletic Union Championships In 1971, Bruce set a new American record in the 100-yard breaststroke in the preliminaries of the NCAA championships. As previously noted, in April 1972, Bruce set a new American record for the 100-yard breaststroke with a time of 56.83, at the NCAA finals, taking first place. Job planned to take off a quarter at UCLA to train with the Santa Clara Club for the 1972 Olympics. At the Pacific 8 Championships in his Senior year at UCLA, Bruce placed third in the 100-yard breaststroke with a time of :58.6.

== 1972 Munich Olympics ==
Bruce represented the United States at the 1972 Summer Olympics in Munich, Germany. At Munich, he won a silver medal in the men's 100-meter breaststroke with a time of 1:05.43. At the eighty-five meter mark, with the race nearing completion, Bruce seemed to have won the race, but Nobutaka Taguchi of Japan quickly accelerated, passing Bruce to capture the gold medal with a world record time of 1:04.94. In a close finish, Bruce managed second place in 1:05.43, with American John Hencken winning bronze in a time of 1:05.61, followed by American Mark Chatfield.

Bruce earned a gold medal swimming the breaststroke leg for the winning U.S. team in the men's 4×100-meter medley relay. Bruce, together with his relay teammates Mike Stamm (backstroke), Mark Spitz (butterfly) and Jerry Heidenreich (freestyle), set a new world record of 3:48.16.

=== Later life ===
He married his wife Marilee around 1987.

He died on April 9, 2020, at the age of 67 in Royal Oaks, California after a battle with cancer. Before retirement, he worked as a director of hospital facilities, largely at Hazel Hawkins Memorial Hospital in Hollister, California. He was survived by his wife Marilee, son Cameron, daughter Lanie, brother Phil, a large loyal group of family, friends, and his dog Buster.

== See also ==
- List of Olympic medalists in swimming (men)
- List of University of California, Los Angeles people
- World record progression 4 × 100 metres medley relay
