= Mingione =

Mingione is an Italian surname. Notable people with the surname include:

- Edmondo Mingione (born 1952), Italian swimmer
- Ernest Mingione (fl. from 1995), American actor
- Giuseppe Mingione (born 1972), Italian mathematician
- Nick Mingione (born 1978), American college baseball coach and former outfielder
