= David Haller (swimmer) =

British swimmer (born 1945)

Personal information
- Full name: David Joseph George Haller
- Nationality: British
- Born: 27 January 1945 (age 81) Southampton, Hampshire
- Occupations: Club & Olympic Coach (Western Secondary) (Southampton Swim Club) (City of Cardiff Swim Club)
- Height: 184 cm (6 ft 0 in)
- Weight: 79 kg (174 lb)
- Spouse: Mary Helen Laity (1968)

Sport
- Sport: Swimming
- Event: 100 freestyle
- Strokes: Freestyle
- Club: Southampton Swim Club
- Coach: Deryk Snelling (Southampton, British Nat. Team)

David Joseph George Haller MBE (born 27 January 1945) is a British former swimmer and swimming coach who represented Great Britain in the 100-meter freestyle at the 1964 Olympics. He swam the 100-meter freestyle representing Britain in the 1964 Summer Olympics, and coached swimming for the City of Cardiff, Wales, and for the British National team at ten Olympic Games. An exceptionally successful coach in mentoring champions, Haller produced a swimmer for every Olympic Games from 1968 through 2012.

== Early life ==
Haller was born 27 January 1945 in Southampton, Hampshire, Great Britain, though he grew up in the nearby coastal town of Penarth, Wales. He attended High School at the Taunton School, South of Penarth across the Bristol Channel in Taunton, Somerset, where he set numerous swimming and athletic records. He was a member of Southampton Athletic Club where he was a Hampshire Junior Javelin Champion and secured the Southampton Javelin record with a 189-foot throw. A multi-sport athlete in his youth, he played basketball for the Solent Club and played football for his High School team, the Old Tauntonians. After 1962, by the age of 17, he trained in swimming with Hall of Fame Coach Deryk Snelling's at the Southampton Swimming Club, which was one of Snellings earliest coaching positions. Haller made steady progress under Snelling, and by May 1963 was only 1.2 seconds away from breaking the British record for the 110-yard freestyle. In 1964, he broke the British 110-yard freestyle record with a time of 55.8 seconds, and was later selected for the 1964 British Olympic Swimming team.

While swimming for the British National Team, Haller continued to be trained by Deryk Snelling in the 1960s while Haller and National teammate Keith Buley worked out while they trained for the 1964 Olympics. Snelling, a stroke specialist and author on swimming, believed the system he used to train swimmers, gave Dave Haller the essential knowledge to later become an effective coach. Like Haller, Snelling used a method to train his swimmers consisting of careful teaching of mechanics, improving conditioning, imbuing mental toughness, focus, and endurance and instilling team spirit. Haller, like Snelling tried not to appear overly strict or brutal to his swimmers.

== 1964 Tokyo Olympics ==
On October 12, 1964, Haller competed for Great Britain in the men's 100 metre freestyle at the 1964 Summer Olympics in Tokyo, tying for 47th place overall with Ralph Hutton of Canada, while recording a time of 57.7.

At 24, on July 27, 1968, while he was working as Southampton Swimming Club's coach, he married Miss Mary Helen Laity, originally of Surrey, at the Southampton Civic Center. Mary Laity, like David was a resident of Carlton-court, Southampton where she had resided for two years, and shared his interest in swimming at the Southampton Swimming Club.

== Coaching ==
Haller began his coaching career as a physical education master at Western Secondary Modern School, now Western Secondary School. After his future British National team coach, Deryk Snelling left the Southampton School to coach the Vancouver Dolphins in Canada, Haller was hired fulltime by Southampton in November, 1967, though he had been coaching there earlier on a part-time basis. Haller continued as Head Coach at Southampton through around 1974. The Southampton School had a well-recognized athletic program and swim club in Southampton, Hampshire, a coastal city in Southeast, England. Haller noted, "it will be a great challenge to maintain the success which Deryk achieved during his five years as coach".

=== City of Cardiff coach ===
Beginning in 1974, Haller served as the Head Coach for the City of Cardiff Swimming Club in Cardiff, Wales. After achieving notable success at the City of Cardiff, Haller was National Team Coach for Britain at ten Olympic Games and for England, Wales or Hong Kong at twelve Commonwealth Games. Among those whom he coached during this period as National team coach were the Olympic Gold Medallists David Wilkie, Duncan Goodhew and David Davies. In an interview Davies attributed much of his success to his Coach David Haller. He said, "If it weren't for David, I wouldn't be getting up at 5:00 AM. Its easier...when you know you're working with someone who is so dedicated."

Both Haller and former national British swim teammate Keith Buley were part of the three-person British Coaching Staff for the British Olympic team in 1980.

=== Return as Cardiff Head Coach ===
After coaching on the international level for Great Britain, Haller returned to Coach swimming at Cardiff in 1994. He was a part of the success of Cardiff's Olympic medalist David Davies who he helped lead to an Olympic bronze medal at the 2004 Athens Olympics in the 1500m Freestyle. Later Davies won a silver medal at the Beijing Olympics in the 10K Open Water Marathon. At the 2006 Melbourne Commonwealth Games, Davies captured a gold medal in the 1500m and a bronze in the 400 metre event.

With continuing success as Cardiff's Head swimming coach, he had two swimmers from Cardiff on the 2012 London Olympic team, Ieuan Lloyd and David Davies. It was the third Olympics for Davies.

After 47 years of coaching, Haller retired from the profession of coaching swimming in 2014.

=== Honors ===
In 2008, Haller received the Member of the Order of the British Empire (MBE) award for services to sport. He was voted “Coach of the Year” by the British Swimming Coaches Association on nine occasions. In 2012, he became a member of the Swim Wales Hall of Fame.
