= Andy Knowles =

Andy Knowles may refer to:

- Andy Knowles (musician)
- Andy Knowles (swimmer)

== See also ==
- Andrew Knowles and Sons, English coal mining company
