= Percy Knowles =

Bahamian sailor

Percival Andrew Knowles (born 8 November 1930) is a Bahamian former sailor who competed in the 1960, 1964, 1968, and 1972 Summer Olympics.

== Early life ==
Percival Andrew Knowles Sr was born on 8 November 1930 in Nassau, Bahamas. He was the son of John Henry Knowles and his second wife, Irma Pinder Knowles. His elder half-brother, from his father's first marriage, was the Olympian Durward Knowles.

== Sporting career ==
Knowles represented the Bahamas in sailing at the 1960, 1964, 1968 and 1972 Olympics. In Tokyo, Knowles competed in the 5.5 class.

In 1963, he became a Vice Commander of the new Bahamas Air-Sea Rescue Auxilliary (BASRA) organisation.

Over the years, Knowles has continued to participate in competitive sport, taking part in Masters swimming tournaments. In 2010, he competed at the US National Masters Swimming Championships where he won a bronze in the 100 yd breaststroke and, later that year, at the World Masters Championships in Sweden. In 2017, he won the 100 and 200 yd breaststroke and the 100 and 200 yd freestyle in the 85-89 age group at the 2017 Auburn Masters Invitational swim meet. In 2024, the 93 year old Knowles, his son Andy Knowles, grandson Jeremy Knowles, and 14 year-old grandson competed in the Bahamas National Swimming Championships in the 4 x 50 m team relay in an unprecedented "generations" team.

== Personal life ==
Knowles married Frances Ingraham in 1953. The couple had two sons and two daughter. Their son, Bruce Knowles is also a former Olympian.
