= Bill Kennedy (swimmer) =

Canadian swimmer (born 1952)

Personal information
- Full name: William Ray Kennedy
- Nickname: "Bill"
- National team: Canada
- Born: October 26, 1952 (age 73) London, Ontario
- Height: 1.78 m (5 ft 10 in)
- Weight: 71 kg (157 lb)

Sport
- Sport: Swimming
- Strokes: Backstroke
- College team: University of Michigan
Medal record
Men's swimming
Representing Canada
Olympic Games
Bronze medal – third place	1972 Munich	4×100 m medley
Pan American Games
Bronze medal – third place	1971 Cali	100 m backstroke
Commonwealth Games
Gold medal – first place	1970 Edinburgh	100 m backstroke
Gold medal – first place	1970 Edinburgh	4×100 m medley

William Ray Kennedy (born October 26, 1952) is a Canadian former swimmer who competed at the 1972 Summer Olympics. He swam for Canada's third-place team in the preliminary heats of the men's 4x100-metre medley relay. He was ineligible to receive a medal under the Olympic swimming rules then in effect, however, because he did not swim in the event final. He also competed in the preliminary heats of the men's 200-metre backstroke, but did not advance.

Kennedy won a bronze medal in the 100-metre backstroke at the 1971 Pan American Games in Cali, Colombia, and gold medals in the 100-metre backstroke and 4x100-metre medley relay at the 1970 Commonwealth Games in Edinburgh, Scotland.

== See also ==
- List of Commonwealth Games medallists in swimming (men)
- List of University of Michigan alumni
