= Steve Pickell =

Canadian swimmer (born 1957)

Personal information
- Full name: Stephen John Pickell
- Nickname: "Steve"
- National team: Canada
- Born: August 11, 1957 (age 69) Vancouver, British Columbia

Sport
- Sport: Swimming
- Strokes: Backstroke, freestyle
- Club: Canadian Dolphin Swim Club
- College team: University of Southern California
Medal record
Men's swimming
Representing Canada
Olympic Games
Silver medal – second place	1976 Montreal	4×100 m medley
British Commonwealth Games
Gold medal – first place	1974 Christchurch	4×100 m medley
Silver medal – second place	1974 Christchurch	100 m backstroke
Pan American Games
Silver medal – second place	1979 San Juan	4×100 m medley
Bronze medal – third place	1979 San Juan	100 m backstroke

Stephen John Pickell (born August 11, 1957) is a retired Canadian competitive swimmer for the University of Southern California, and was a silver medalist for Canada in the 1976 Montreal Olympics.

== Swimming career ==
Pickell began swimming competitively around the age of eight and joined the Canadian national team five years later, making his debut at the 1973 World Championships. At the 1974 British Commonwealth games, he won gold as a member of the 4×100 meter medley relay, swimming with Bill Mahony, Brian Phillips, and Bruce Robertson, and captured a silver in the 100-meter backstroke, behind Mark Tonelli of Australia.

=== 1976 Montreal Olympics ===
He won a silver medal in the men's 4x100-metre medley relay at the 1976 Summer Olympics in Montreal, Quebec, Canada. He did so alongside Graham Smith, Clay Evans and Gary MacDonald. Despite being Canadian he won the 1969 ASA National British Championships 100 metres backstroke title and the 200 metres backstroke title.

He swam for the University of Southern California on an athletic scholarship after the 1976 Olympics, and attended from around 1976-80, where he was mentored by Hall of Fame Head Coach Peter Daland. A major contributor to the NCAA Championships, as a Sophomore in 1978, he was unable to attend the championships due to a shoulder separation he suffered playing for the USC Water Polo team.

He was again picked for the Canadian team for the 1980 Summer Olympics, but did not attend when Canada joined the United States to boycott the Moscow Games. Prior injuries convinced him to retire not long after, since graduating from USC, he has worked in insurance and coached swimming at high school and club levels.

== See also ==
- List of Commonwealth Games medallists in swimming (men)
- List of Olympic medalists in swimming (men)
