= Gary MacDonald (swimmer) =

Canadian swimmer, (1953-) Olympic silver medallist

Personal information
- Full name: Gary Wayne MacDonald
- National team: Canada
- Born: December 15, 1953 (age 72) Mission, British Columbia
- Occupations: Swim Coach (York University 1979-1980) (Canad. Dolphin 1980-1983) (Halifax Trojan AC 1983-2004) (Dalhousie University 2004-15) (Acadia University 2015-)

Sport
- Sport: Swimming
- Strokes: Freestyle, Individual Medley
- Club: Mission Marlins
- College team: Simon Fraser University (SFU)
- Coach: Paul Savage (SFU)
Medal record
Men's swimming
Representing Canada
Olympic Games
Silver medal – second place	1976 Montreal	4×100 m medley
Pan American Games
Silver medal – second place	1975 Mexico City	4×100 m freestyle
Silver medal – second place	1975 Mexico City	4×100 m medley
Commonwealth Games
Gold medal – first place	1974 Christchurch	4×100 m freestyle
Gold medal – first place	1978 Edmonton	4×100 m freestyle
Bronze medal – third place	1974 Christchurch	200 m medley
Bronze medal – third place	1974 Christchurch	4×200 m freestyle
Bronze medal – third place	1978 Edmonton	100 m freestyle

Gary Wayne MacDonald (born December 15, 1953) is a Canadian freestyle swimmer who competed for Simon Fraser University and won a silver medal representing Canada in the 1976 Montreal Olympics in the Men's 4×100 m medley relay. MacDonald was the Canadian record holder in the 100 and 50-metre freestyle and the 200 metre individual medley, demonstrating his skills as a multi-stroke technician. After completing his education and coaching swimming at Toronto's York University from 1979-1980, he coached the Canadian Dolphin SC in Vancouver, British Columbia from 1980-1983, then moved East to Nova Scottia and coached swimming for the Halifax Trojan Aquatic Club from 1983-2004. Remaining in greater Halifax, he then coached at Dalhousie University from 2004-2015 and then moved sixty miles North to Acadia University in Wolfville, Nova Scottia, where he began as Head Coach in 2015, continuing through around 2021.

MacDonald was born December 15, 1953 in Mission, British Columbia, Canada, and began his career swimming for the Mission Marlins. As the pool was outdoors, MacDonald trained primarily in the summers, and did not engage in the long and strenuous year-round sessions typical of an elite swimmer. Still recognized for his achievements by his High School Senior year in 1970, he held the 15-16 age group record in both the 220 yard individual medley of 2:39.2, and the 110-yard backstroke with a recorded time of 1:10.9. He began more extensive training as a future champion during his college swimming career.

== Simon Fraser University ==
He attended and swam for Simon Fraser University (SFU), enrolling in 1971 at the age of 17. During his time swimming for SFU, he was managed and trained by accomplished coach Paul Savage, an NAIA Coach of the Year in 1972, 1979, and 1983. As a Freshman in 1972, MacDonald helped the SFU swim team capture its first of nine successive national championships in the National Association of Intercollegiate Athletics (NAIA) conference, which included MacDonald's years of participation in 1972, 1973, 1975, and 1976. In 1975, MacDonald won three NAIA national titles in individual events which included the 50-yard freestyle, the 100-yard freestyle, and the 100-yard butterfly. It was the most titles ever won in one year by an SFU swimmer.

Practicing throughout the year, MacDonald's practices at SFU included weight training and averaged a daily four hours, achieving All American status by his second year of competition. Excelling in regional and national competition on the college level, he went nearly undefeated in races in his last two years of collegiate eligibility. In his first two years at SFU, as a highly versatile stroke technician, he focused on the Individual Medley, and then focused more on freestyle sprints.

During his time with the SFU team, he captured bronze and gold medals at the 1974 British Commonwealth Games, and in 1975 captured two silver medals in relay events at the Pan American Games.

== 1976 Montreal Olympics ==
MacDonald won a silver medal in the men's 4×100-metre medley relay at the 1976 Summer Olympics in Montreal, with his relay team of Graham Smith, Clay Evans, and Stephen Pickell recording a combined time of 3:45.94 in the finals. The Canadian team was originally ranked at only third or fourth in the event, and knew they would be unlikely to beat the American team, who touched 3.7 seconds before Canada, and took the gold with a world record time of 3:42.22. Swimming the last leg as freestyle anchor for the American team was the 100-meter 1976 Olympic gold medalist and world record holder Jim Montgomery.

In his second 1976 Olympic event, MacDonald placed 13th in the 100 meter freestyle with an overall time of 52.96, about 1.64 seconds from contending for the bronze medal. American Jim Montgomery took the gold, American Jack Babashoff took the silver, and German Swimmer Peter Nocke took the bronze with a time of 51.31.

MacDonald has held Canadian records in the 100 and 50 meter freestyle, and in the 200 metre individual medley.

MacDonald attended Ontario's York University where he completed his B.S. in Physical Education in 1978, and did some early swim coaching. He swam representing Canada through 1978, when he competed in the World Championships and the Commonwealth Games. At the 1978 Commonwealth Games, he captured gold in the 4x100 m freestyle relay with Graham Smith, Bill Sawchuk, and Peter Szmidt and won an individual event bronze in the 100 m freestyle.

== Coaching ==
MacDonald's first coaching experience was at Toronto, Ontario's York University in 1979-1980, where he attended classes and brought the swim team to finish third-place at the CIAU (CIS) national championships. He then moved to coach at Vancouver, British Columbia's Canadian Dolphin Club in central Canada from 1980-1983. The club was closer to his home in Mission, British Columbia, 45 miles Southeast of the Dolphin Club in Vancouver, British Columbia.

=== Halifax Aquatic and Dalhousie U ===
MacDonald then relocated to Canada's East Coast to begin his longest coaching stint at the Halifax Trojan Aquatic Club, a strong program in Nova Scottia where he served for over twenty years from 1983-2004. The Halifax Aquatic club is currently housed at the Dalhousie University Pool. MacDonald then Assistant coached at Halifax's Dalhousie University where he served from 2004-2015 first as an Assistant to Head Coach David Fry, until Fry left in 2012, then as an Assistant Coach to Fry's successor as Head Coach, Lance Cansdale through 2015.

=== Acadia University ===
After committing to the new role in late March, in September 2015 he began his duties as Head Swim Coach of Acadia University where he replaced interim Head Coach David Fry with whom he had formerly coached at Dalhousie University. A strong team, in the 2014-2015 season Acadia had fought to runner-up finish at the Atlantic University Sport (AUS) championship and sent eight swimmers to Ontario's Conference of Independent School's (CIS) Championship. MacDonald won a coaching award while coaching Acadia in 2020, but as of 2021, Kris Bell has been Acadia's Head Swimming Coach for both the Men's and Women's teams. MacDonald may have retired fully from swim coaching around age 68 in 2021, or served in an auxiliary coaching or administrative role at Acadia or the swimming community.

During his long career, a few of his top swimmers included Halifax breaststroker Carwai Seto who swam in the 1988 Olympics for Taiwan, and Iona Allen, a gold medal 400 IM winner at the 1992 National Championships.

=== Honors ===
MacDonald was inducted into the Simon Fraser Hall of Fame in 1987 and is a member of the National Association of Intercollegiate Athletics (NAIA) Hall of Fame. In 2003, the Gary MacDonald Park on Bobcat Drive in MacDonald's hometown of Mission, British Columbia, Canada was named in his honor, and he is a member of the Mission Sports Hall of Fame as the town's first Olympian. In 2020, while still coaching at Acadia University, MacDonald was honored as the Atlantic University Sport Male Swimming Coach of the year, having once previously received the honor.

== See also ==
- List of Commonwealth Games medallists in swimming (men)
- List of Olympic medalists in swimming (men)
