= Deryk Snelling =

British swimming coach

Biographical details
- Born: July 22, 1933; Darwen, Lancashire, England
- Died: September 4, 2021 (aged 88); Vancouver Island, British Columbia, Canada

Playing career
- Positions: 1951 British National Title; 100-yard Breaststroke; Butterfly National Title

Coaching career (HC unless noted)
- 1961-1967: Southampton Swim Club; Southampton, England
- 1967-1975: Canadian Dolphin Swim Club; Vancouver, B.C.
- 1976-1980: Etobicoke Swim Club; Etobicoke, Toronto, Ontario
- 1980-1996: University of Calgary
- 1984-1988: University of Calgary Swim Club

Accomplishments and honors

Championships
- 9 National Titles; 11 Canada West Championships (University of Calgary)

Awards
- 1993 International Swimming Hall of Fame; 4 x Canadian Swim Coach of the Year; 6 x C.I.A.U. Coach of the Year; Order of Canada Award

Deryk Sydney Snelling (22 July 1933 – 4 September 2021) was a British-born swimming coach for both Britain and Canada best known for leading the University of Calgary swimming team to nine national and 11 Canadian West Conference Championships from 1980 to 1996. He served as a Coach to the Canadian Olympic team in seven Olympics from 1972 to 1996, and has been recognized as one of the most honored swim coaches in recent history by the Alberta Sports Hall of Fame, BC Sports Hall of Fame, and both the Canadian and International Swimming Halls of Fame. Snelling mentored fifty-seven of his swimmers to berths on Olympic teams, with Olympic medals earned by twenty-one. In non-Olympic international competition, swimmers coached by Snelling amassed ten World Championship medals, thirty-eight medals in the Pan American games, twenty-seven medals in the Pan Pacific Games, and sixty-five medals in the British Commonwealth Games. For his contributions to Canadian swimming on both the club, university, and Olympic level, many sports historians consider him Canada's greatest contemporary swim coach.

== Early life ==
Snelling was born in Darwen, Lancashire, England, on July 22, 1933, the eldest of five children of Sydney Snelling and Edith Taylor. He attended Spring Bank Secondary School in Darwen, growing up on Blackburn street. He was Captain of Darwen's Anchor House Boys Team and participated in many sports, but most excelled in swimming where he competed at the Darwen Baths. His father owned grocery stores, and a number of other businesses where Snelling occasionally worked growing up. He swam for his school team, and became known in the 1950s as a British national swimmer and English swimming champion. By 1951, he held the British 200-yard National breaststroke title and a national butterfly title.

Despite holding two national championships in swimming, he was not selected for the 1952 Helsinki Olympics to compete for Britain, according to many reporters as a result of his social class. He instead served from 1952 to 1954 in the British army with the Lancashire Fusiliers, where he became a boxing champion, and served as an instructor of Physical Training.

After his military service, Snelling married Laura Entwistle, who was also a native of Darwen, on March 14, 1955. The couple eventually had three children together. At the time of his marriage, he was working shifts at a Darwen Cotton mill, where he swam on the company team.

== Southampton Swim Club ==
Deciding he wanted to teach swimming, Snelling responded to an Ad for a teacher and swim coach with the Southampton Education Authority and began at the Southampton Swim Club as his first full-time coaching endeavor in 1962. Southampton is located in Southeast England, 70 miles Southwest of London. He had noteworthy success through 1968. His title included serving as the head of swimming for Southampton Education Committee. While at Southampton, he first coached David Haller.

== Canadian Dolphin Swim Club ==
Leaving England for Canada in 1967, he took over Vancouver's Canadian Dolphin Swim club from Hall of Fame Coach Howard Firby. Snelling served as Head Coach through 1975. Firby had founded the club in 1955 with William H. Stewart, the father of Canadian Olympic medalists Helen Stewart Hunt and Mary Stewart, one of the seven original members. A dominant program between 1956 and 1967, Firby's Vancouver Canadian Dolphin team won six Canadian National team titles, with the exception of the year 1965. Deryk with Snelling on his Dolphin Swim Club between 1973 and 1977 won 65 of the 130 titles available in Canadian national competition. From 1966 to 1967, the Dolphins won the over-all Canadian team title every year. Vancouver Dolphin trained Wendy Cook Hogg set a world record in the 100-meter backstroke in the 400 meter medley relay at the 1974 Commonwealth Games.

== Etobicoke Swim Club ==
Snelling coached the Etobicoke Swim Club beginning in 1976 and continuing through 1980. He was attracted to the Etobicoke program partly for the privilege of coaching swimmers at the modern 6.2 million dollar Etobicoke Olympium facility built in 1975 in Toronto's Centennial Park. While at Etibicoke, he grew the program to over 2OO members, and led the swimmers he coached to win the Canadian Championships in each of the years Snelling served as coach. As many as 50% of the swimmers who competed for Canada in international competition were drawn from Snelling's Etobicoke Club. During his time at Etobicoke, he was suspended from coaching in International Competitions by Federation Internationale de Natation Amateur (FINA), and the Canadian Amateur Swimming Association (CASA) for lectures he gave in South Africa during Apartheid. After leaving Etobicoke for University of Calgary, he was replaced by Assistant Coach Trevor Tiffany, who moved up to Head Coach.

== University of Calgary ==
While coaching the Etobicoke Club in 1979–80, Snelling was tasked with helping to find a University of Calgary Head swim coach by the university's Dean of Physical Education, Roger Jackson, a gold medalist in Olympic rowing. Discouraged by his inability to find a suitable Head Coach, Dean Jackson asked Snelling to consider the position himself, and Snelling eventually accepted realizing the importance of collegiate swimming. The university was able to offer scholarships at the time, but was looking to grow its facilities and make its swim program more competitive in order to keep more Canadian swimmers from accepting scholarships at American Universities. While at the university, Snelling also served as an assistant professor on the physical education faculty in beginning in the Fall of 1980. Snelling counted on Graham Smith, winner of six gold medals at the 1978 Commonwealth Games, as one of his first outstanding recruits on the team. Though Smith, like many top Canadian prospects initially swam for an American school, the University of California Berkeley, he would finish his collegiate career with Snelling's University of Calgary team, and help lead them to six national titles. Snelling was able to recruit other former Calgary area swimmers including Lisa Dixon, Gabrielle Sponheimer, and Maureen Sheehan, as well as Mike Olson, who Snelling had just coached at Etobicoke.

Snelling coached at the University of Calgary from 1980 to 1996, where he led the Men's team to win nine National titles and 11 Canada West Conference titles. He coached the Dinos women's team to three Conference championships.

He coached the University of Calgary Swim Club from around 1984–1988.

Snelling used a method to train his swimmers focusing on the careful teaching of mechanics. He provided training to improve conditioning, focus and endurance that would imbue mental toughness, increase focus, and instill team spirit. He tried not to appear overly strict or brutal to his swimmers.

=== International Coaching ===
He helped coach the Canadian Olympic Team in seven successive Olympics from 1972 through 1996, serving as Head Coach in 1972, 1976, 1980, 1984, and 1992 Olympics. He coached Britain's national swim team from 1996 to 2000 serving as Technical Director. He was replaced by Australian Coach Bill Sweetenham in November 2000, when the British swimming team failed to win medals in 2000. After a short retirement after 2000, he served as the Coordinator for Canadian National Team Development. After retiring, he served as the National Performance Director for the British swimming program and in the 2000 Olympic Games served as the country's head coach.

He served as Head Coach of the Commonwealth Games Teams five times, and was Head Coach of one World Championship Team.

== Outstanding swimmers and their achievements ==
Outstanding swimmers include 1992 100 backstroke Barcelona Olympic Gold Medalist Mark Tewksbury, 1972 Olympic Silver medalist in the 400 IM, Leslie Cliff, who he trained with the Vancouver Dolphins. He trained 1972 Olympic 100 Fly silver medalist Bruce Robertson. He also coached Wendy Cook Hogg, who in 1974 set the World Record in the 100 meter backstroke and was a 1976 Olympic bronze medal winner. For three months he coached Irish competitor Michelle Smith in preparation for the 1988 Olympics. At the 1996 Atlanta Olympic Games, she captured 3 gold and 1 bronze.

He was a coach to Cheryl Gibson, Tom Ponting, and Susan Sloan when they competed at international competitions.

Snelling is known to have coached fifty-seven of his swimmers onto Olympic teams, and having twenty-one of them that earned medals. In non-Olympic international competition, swimmers coached by Snelling amassed ten World Aquatic Championship medals, thirty-eight medals in the Pan American games, twenty-seven medals in the Pan Pacific Games, and sixty-five medals in the British Commonwealth Games. Like many highly recognized coached, Snelling supported a number of his swimmers to become coaches, including David Haller, who was a British Olympic and British Coach of the Year.

=== Publications ===
Snelling is the author of All About the Individual Medley: All Four Strokes, (1975) Luscombe Publishers, London, ISBN 9780860020165. The book focuses on the value of training swimmers on all four competitive swimming strokes. It addresses techniques to use for training swimmers, describes the essentials of stroke mechanics for all the competitive strokes, and discusses how to transition between strokes when performing the Individual Medley. He has also written articles, which published by numerous sports periodicals and journals.

=== Honors ===
In his early career in February 1977, after his stint with the Canadian Dolphins in Vancouver, he received the distinctive Order of Canada Award. In a rare honor for a Canadian coach, in 1993 Snelling was an inductee to the International Swimming Hall of Fame in Fort Lauderdale. Recognized widely in Canada, he was made a member of the Alberta Sport Hall of Fame, the BC Swim Coaches Hall of Fame, and the Canadian Swimming Hall of Fame. Snelling was a Canadian Swim-Coach-of-the-Year in three years, 1978, 1988, and 1992. While coaching at U. of Calgary, he was a Canadian Interscholastic Athletic Union (CIAU) Coach of the Year seven times from 1982 to 1988. In 1990, he was awarded the Coaching Canada Award by 3M, and in 2005 was honored as one among 100 other nominated sportsmen candidates to be awarded the Alberta Centennial Salute for Sport and Recreation. He was made an Inaugural member of the Canadian Swim Coaches and Teachers Association Hall of Fame in 2014.

Deryk died of diagnosed heart failure on September 4, 2021, on Vancouver Island, British Columbia, having been predeceased by his wife Laura on March 5, 2020. He was buried next to Laura at Yates Cemetery in Parksville in the Nanaimo Regional District, in British Columbia.
