= Igor Cherdakov =

Russian swimmer

Personal information
- Nationality: Russian
- Born: 3 October 1955 (age 70)

Sport
- Sport: Swimming
Medal record
Representing Soviet Union
Summer Universiade
Silver medal – second place	1973 Moscow	100m breaststroke
Silver medal – second place	1973 Moscow	200m breaststroke
Silver medal – second place	1973 Moscow	4x100m medley relay

Igor Cherdakov (born 3 October 1955) is a Russian former swimmer. He competed in the men's 200 metre breaststroke at the 1972 Summer Olympics for the Soviet Union.
