= Angela López =

Puerto Rican swimmer (born 1955)

Personal information
- National team: Puerto Rico
- Born: 2 December 1955 (age 70)

Sport
- Sport: Swimming
- College team: University of Pittsburgh

Angela López (born 2 December 1955) is a Puerto Rican former swimmer. She competed in four events at the 1976 Summer Olympics for Puerto Rico including the 100 and 200-meter breaststroke events and as a member of the 100-meter freestyle and 100-meter medley relay teams. She also competed in the 1975 Pan American Games for Puerto Rico.

== College ==
López competed at the University of Pittsburgh where she earned All-American status in 200m breast in 1974, the first woman swimmer at the university to obtain that achievement, and also earned All-American status in the 100m breast in 1975. She was inducted into the university's athletic hall of fame in 2022.
