= Michele Di Pietro =

Italian swimmer

Personal information
- Born: 11 October 1954 (age 71) Naples, Italy

Sport
- Sport: Swimming

Michele Di Pietro (born 11 October 1954) is an Italian former swimmer. He competed in the men's 200 metre breaststroke at the 1972 Summer Olympics.
