= Clay Evans (swimmer) =

Canadian swimmer (born 1953)

Personal information
- Full name: Clayton T. Evans
- Nickname: "Clay"
- National team: Canada
- Born: October 28, 1953 (age 72) El Bagic, Colombia
- Height: 1.83 m (6 ft 0 in)
- Weight: 71 kg (157 lb)

Sport
- Sport: Swimming
- Strokes: Backstroke, butterfly, medley
- College team: University of California, Los Angeles
Medal record
Men's swimming
Representing Canada
Olympic Games
Silver medal – second place	1976 Montreal	4×100 m medley
Pan American Games
Bronze medal – third place	1979 San Juan	100 m butterfly

Clayton T. Evans (born October 28, 1953) is a Canadian former competition swimmer and Olympic silver medalist. Evans represented Canada at the 1972 and 1976 Olympics.

At the 1972 Summer Olympics in Munich, West Germany, Evans competed in the qualifying heats of the men's 100-metre backstroke and the men's 200-metre individual medley, but did not advance.

After the 1972 Olympics, Evans attended the University of California, Los Angeles (UCLA), where he swam for the UCLA Bruins swimming team in National Collegiate Athletic Association (NCAA) and Pacific-10 Conference competition from 1973 to 1976. As a Bruin swimmer, he won the Pac-10 individual championships in the 100-yard butterfly in 1973, 1974 and 1976. He received four All-American honors during his college swimming career.

At the 1976 Summer Olympics in Montreal, Quebec, he swam the butterfly leg for Canada's second-place relay team in the final of the men's 4×100-metre medley relay, together with Stephen Pickell (backstroke), Graham Smith (breaststroke) and Gary MacDonald (freestyle). The Canadians finished in 3:45.94, behind the American team that set a new world record of 3:42.22. Individually, Evans also competed in the men's 100-metre butterfly, finishing sixth in the event final with a time of 55.81 seconds.

After the 1976 Olympics, Evans continued to train in the hope of competing at the 1980 Summer Olympics. At the 1979 Pan American Games in San Juan, Puerto Rico, he competed in the men's 100-metre butterfly, finishing third with a time of 56.63 seconds. He could not compete in the 1980 Olympics because of the boycott of the Moscow Summer Olympic Games.

== See also ==
- List of Olympic medalists in swimming (men)
- List of University of California, Los Angeles people
