= Sherm Chavoor =

American swimming coach

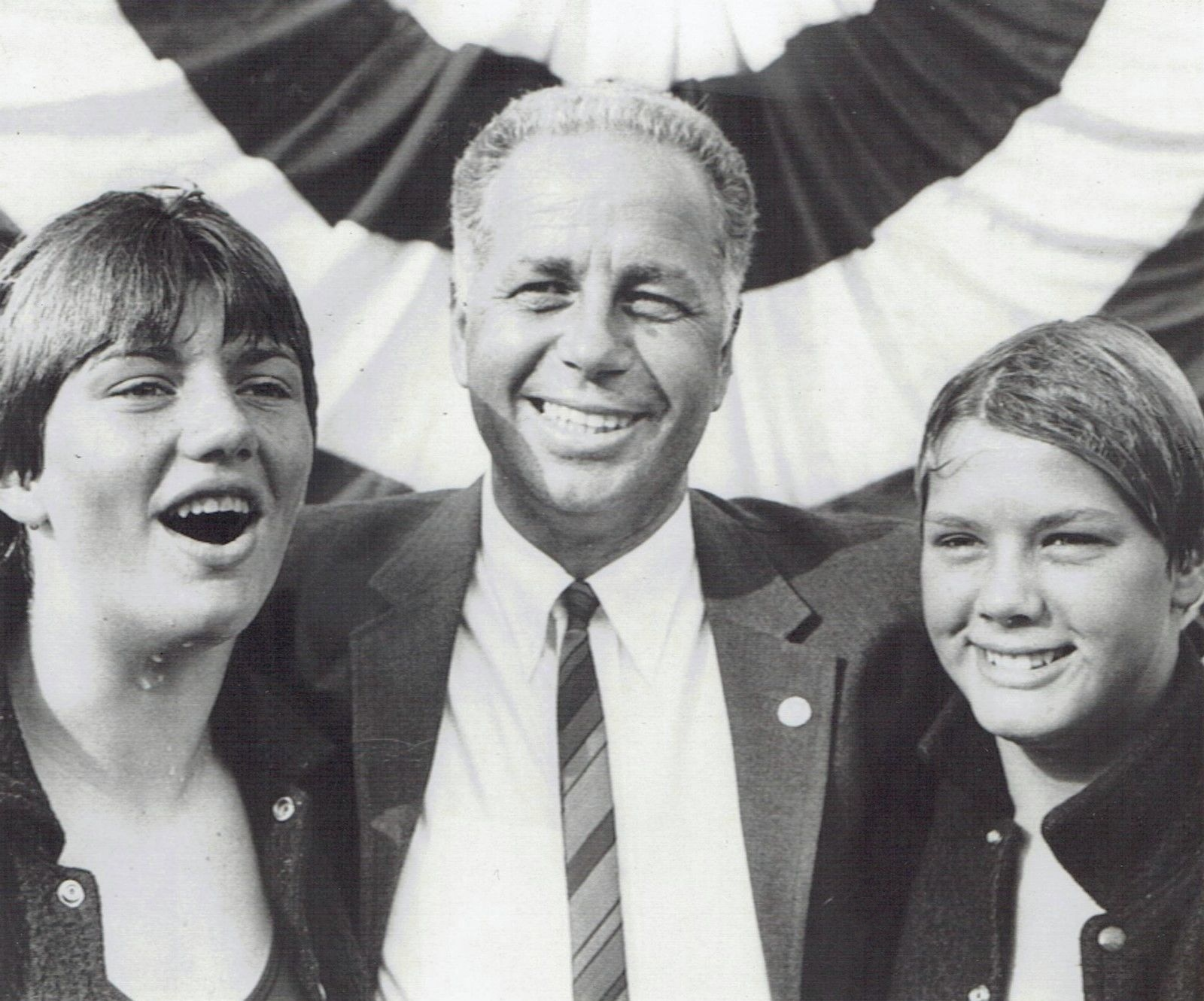
- Chavoor center, with his '68 triple gold medalists Sue Pedersen (left) and Debbie Meyer (right), 1967

Biographical details
- Born: April 10, 1919; Hilo, Hawaii
- Died: September 3, 1992 (aged 73); Gold River, California, U.S.

Coaching career (HC unless noted)
- 1949-1954: Sacramento YMCA; Schoolteacher
- 1954-1985: Arden Hills Swim Club; Carmichael, California
- 1989-1990: Rancho Arroyo Swim Team
- 1967: Women's Pan Am Team
- 1968, 1972: US Olympic Swim Team, Women

Accomplishments and honors

Championships
- His swimmers won 20 Olympic Gold Medals

Awards
- '02 ASCA Hall of Fame '77 Int. Swim. Hall of Fame '68 ASCA Coach of the Year

Sherm Chavoor (April 10, 1919 – September 3, 1992) was a Hall of Fame swimming coach from the United States. He coached Olympic swimmers Mark Spitz, Debbie Meyer, Mike Burton, Jeff Float, Susan Pedersen, John Ferris, Dave Fairbank, John Nelson and Ellie Daniel at Arden Hills Swimming and Tennis Club in Sacramento, California, which he founded in 1954 and coached through 1985. Chavoor began coaching at the Sacramento YMCA prior to starting Arden Hills.

== Olympic coaching ==
He was head coach of both the 1967 Women's Pan American team, and the USA's Women's Olympic Swimming teams in 1968 and 1972.

== Early life and career ==
He was born as IIzikiel Correa near Hilo, Hawaii the son of a sugar cane worker. He would later change his name to Sherm Chavoor while serving in the U.S. Army. Born one of eight children, he was raised in the East Bay in Oakland and worked on the docks. Just prior to World War II he enlisted in the Army Air Corps.

His first stint as a swim instructor was at the air base in Tonopah, Nevada. After his honorable discharge he married and moved to Sacramento where he was a school teacher and part-time swim instructor at the YMCA in 1946. In an era when minority swimmers were not allowed in most swim clubs, his first YMCA swim teams included Black, White and Japanese American teenagers. His swimmers were immediately successful in AAU swimming. After coaching stints with two other swim teams, Chavoor founded the Arden Hills Swim and Tennis Club in 1955.

== Arden Hills' rise to a U.S. national power ==
=== Over distance training ===
Arden Hills quickly became one of the top swim clubs in the country. Chavoor was somewhat revolutionary in his approach to competitive swimming with what has become known as "over distance training". Chavoor pushed and motivated his students to often swim as much as twice the total distance per practice that other competitive programs were giving their swimmers, and some practices could last as long as four hours. When his swimmers saw a subsequent drop in their times and improvement in their technique, many programs adopted similar approaches as part of their training. He was stern and serious as a coach, and stressed punctuality, but his swimmers truly believed he cared for them and followed his instruction carefully.

Mike Burton and Joan Ferris qualified for the 1964 Olympic Trials, but neither made the team. By 1967 swimmers Debbie Meyer, Sue Pedersen, Mike Burton and John Ferris were setting U.S. and world records. In 1967 Chavoor was named head coach of the U.S. Pan American women's swim team, then tapped to be head women's coach for the 1968 Summer Olympics.

== 1968 Olympics ==
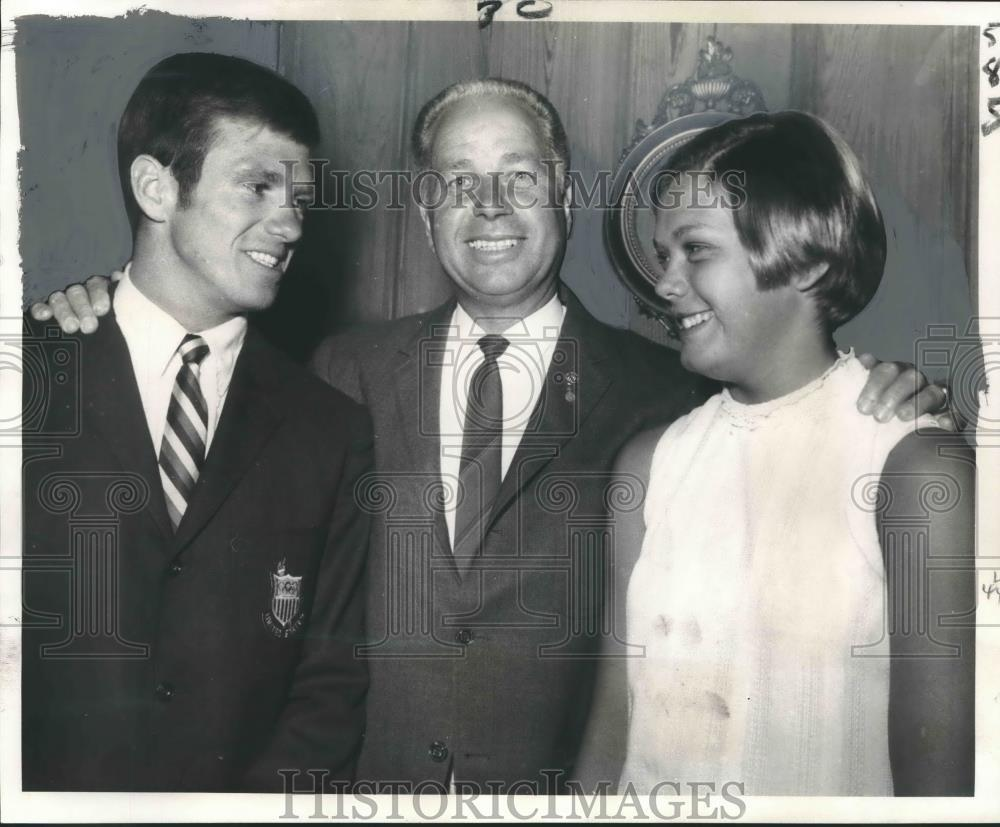
Burton, Sherm Chavoor, Debbie Meyer 1969

Arden Hills' Debbie Meyer won three gold medals, Sue Pedersen won two gold and two silver, Mike Burton won two gold, John Nelson one gold and a bronze, and John Ferris two bronze medals as Arden Hills won 13 total medals. Chavoor's women's team won ten of a possible fifteen gold medals, eight silver out of twelve possible, and eight bronze out of twelve, a total of twenty-six medals out of a possible thirty-nine. The U.S. women won all three relays and scored sweeps in the 100-meter butterfly and 200-meter individual medley.

== 1972 Olympics ==
Arden Hills' Mark Spitz won seven Gold Medals and Mike Burton one gold. Chavoor was once again head coach of the women's team. It won eight gold medals of a possible fourteen, five silver medals of a possible twelve, and four bronze medals of a possible twelve. Combining the 1968 and 1972 records, Chavoor’s women won nineteen of twenty-eight possible gold medals, twelve of twenty- four silver medals, and twelve of a possible twenty-four bronze medals. It was the last Olympic team Chavoor coached, and he went out on top. His two Olympic swimming teams had dominated the world competition and helped establish the U.S. women’s program as the finest on earth.

=== 20 Olympic gold medals ===
A total of 20 gold medals were won by his swimmers in three Olympics. His swimmers Mike Burton, Debbie Meyer, Susan Pederson, John Nelson, Ellie Daniel, and Mark Spitz won a combined 12 gold medals in the 1968 Olympics. Burton and Spitz then won a combined 8 gold medals in 1972, and Jeff Float, Chavoor's last Olympian, won 1 gold in 1984.

== Honors ==
He was named Coach of the Year by the American Swimming Coaches Association in 1968, and was inducted into the International Swimming Hall of Fame in 1977. He has been called one of the "three greatest coaches the United States has ever had." His life is chronicled in the book Victory in the Pool by Bill George. Chavoor published a book co-authored with Bill Davidson titled The 50-Meter Jungle, which told part of his life story.

== Retirement ==
Chavoor sold Arden Hills in 1985 but continued training swimmers until his 1990 retirement from Sacramento's Rancho Arroyo Pool. He played racquetball frequently, and had earlier played squash. In early 1992, he was diagnosed with liver cancer. He died at home on September 3, 1992 in Gold River, California, east of Sacramento. His swimmers won 31 Olympic medals, set 81 world and 131 U.S. records. He is the only swim coach to have produced two James E. Sullivan Award winners (Mark Spitz and Debbie Meyer).
