= Swimming at the 1975 Pan American Games – Men's 200 metre breaststroke =

Men's 200 metre breaststroke at the 1975 Pan American Games
- Venue: -
- Dates: October 21 (preliminaries and finals)
- Competitors: from - nations

Medalists
Gold medal	Rick Colella	United States
Silver medal	Dave Heinbuch	Canada
Bronze medal	Gustavo Lozano	Mexico

The men's 200 metre breaststroke competition of the swimming events at the 1975 Pan American Games took place on 21 October. The last Pan American Games champion was Rick Colella of the United States.

This race consisted of four lengths of the pool, all in breaststroke.

== Results ==
All times are in minutes and seconds.

KEY:	q	Fastest non-qualifiers	Q	Qualified	GR	Games record	NR	National record	PB	Personal best	SB	Seasonal best

=== Final ===
The final was held on October 21.

Rank	Name	Nationality	Time	Notes
1st place, gold medalist(s)	Rick Colella	United States	2:24.00	
2nd place, silver medalist(s)	Dave Heinbuch	Canada	2:28.96	
3rd place, bronze medalist(s)	Gustavo Lozano	Mexico	2:29.28	
4	Sérgio Pinto Ribeiro	Brazil	2:30.08	
5	-	-	-	
6	José Fiolo	Brazil	2:35.48	
7	-	-	-	
8	-	-	-	
