= Colombo Swimming Club =

Swimming club in Colombo, Sri Lanka

The Colombo Swimming Club is a swimming club in Colombo, Sri Lanka, founded in 1938. It is one of the premier clubs in Sri Lanka.

== History ==
Originally formed in 1936, its initial meeting place was the Galle Face Hotel and was known as the Colombo Amateur Swimming Club. In 1938 the Storm Lodge was purchased by the club and a swimming pool built in its premises which was opened by Governor of Ceylon Sir Andrew Caldecott. On 20 July 2017, the Road Development Authority began demolishing parts of the swimming pool to make way for the expansion of the Marine Drive with a Court Order.

== Notable members ==
- Sir Arthur C. Clarke, CBE, FRAS - science fiction writer.
- David Wilkie, MBE - Olympic and Commonwealth Games champion swimmer.

In 1954/5 David Groves at the age of 15 won the Ceylon Swimming Championships Men's 100yds Butterfly and broke the long standing record by several seconds
