= Theodoros Koutoumanis =

Greek swimmer

Personal information
- Born: 20 March 1951 (age 75) Istanbul, Turkey

Sport
- Sport: Swimming

Theodoros Koutoumanis (born 20 March 1951) is a Greek former swimmer. He competed in the men's 100 metre breaststroke at the 1972 Summer Olympics.
