= Dave Heinbuch =

Canadian swimmer (born 1955)

Personal information
- Born: 31 January 1955 (age 71) Kitchener, Ontario, Canada

Sport
- Sport: Swimming
- Strokes: Breaststroke
- College team: Simon Fraser Red Leafs
Medal record
Men's swimming
Representing Canada
Pan American Games
Silver medal – second place	1975 Mexico City	200 m breaststroke

Dave Heinbuch (born 31 January 1955) is a Canadian former swimmer. He competed in the men's 200 metre breaststroke at the 1976 Summer Olympics.
