= Chris Woo =

American swimmer (born 1957)

Personal information
- Full name: Christopher W. T. Woo
- Nickname: "Chris"
- National team: United States
- Born: December 25, 1957 (age 68) Honolulu, Hawaii
- Height: 5 ft 10 in (1.78 m)
- Weight: 165 lb (75 kg)

Sport
- Sport: Swimming
- Strokes: Breaststroke
- Club: Punahou Aquatics
- College team: University of Wisconsin; University of California, Los Angeles

Christopher W. T. Woo (born December 25, 1957) is an American former competition swimmer and world record-holder. He represented the United States at the 1976 Summer Olympics in Montreal, Quebec. Woo competed in the final of the men's 100-meter breaststroke and finished eighth in a time of 1:05.13. He also swam for the gold medal-winning U.S. team in the preliminary heats of the men's 4×100-meter medley relay, but did not receive a medal because he did not swim in the final.

In 1976 he set the U.S. national high school record in the 100-yard breaststroke at 55.99 seconds, which would stand as the record until broken by 1992 Olympic 100-meter breaststroke winner Nelson Diebel.

Woo attended the University of California, Los Angeles (UCLA), where he swam for coach Ron Ballatore's UCLA Bruins swimming and diving team in National Collegiate Athletic Association (NCAA) competition. At the 1979 Pacific-10 Conference championships, he won an individual title in the 100-yard breaststroke, and was a member of the Bruins' winning relay team in the 4x100-yard medley.

Since his retirement from competition swimming, Woo became a dentist.

== See also ==
- List of Olympic medalists in swimming (men)
- List of University of California, Los Angeles people
- World record progression 4 × 100 metres medley relay
