= Diana Hatler =

Puerto Rican swimmer (born 1963)

Personal information
- Born: 1 August 1963 (age 63)

Sport
- Sport: Swimming

Diana Hatler (born 1 August 1963) is a Puerto Rican former swimmer. She competed in four events at the 1976 Summer Olympics.
