= Bernard Combet =

French swimmer

Personal information
- Nationality: French
- Born: 21 September 1953 (age 72)

Sport
- Sport: Swimming
Medal record
Representing France
Mediterranean Games
Silver medal – second place	1975 Algiers	100m breaststroke
Bronze medal – third place	1975 Algiers	4x100m medley relay

Bernard Combet (born 21 September 1953) is a French former swimmer. He competed in the men's 100 metre breaststroke at the 1972 Summer Olympics.
