= Edgardo Berdeguer =

Puerto Rican archer (born 1954)

Personal information
- Nationality: Puerto Rican
- Born: 29 January 1954 (age 71)

Sport
- Sport: Archery

Edgardo Berdeguer (born 29 January 1954) is a Puerto Rican archer. He competed in the men's individual event at the 1976 Summer Olympics.
