= Andrés Arraez =

Venezuelan swimmer

Personal information
- Born: 3 March 1959 (age 67)

Sport
- Sport: Swimming

Andrés Arraez (born 3 March 1959) is a Venezuelan former swimmer. He competed in two events at the 1976 Summer Olympics.
