= Bruce Knowles =

Bahamian swimmer (born 1957)

Personal information
- Full name: Bruce Knowles
- Born: 22 May 1957 (age 69)

Sport
- Sport: Swimming

Bruce Knowles (born 22 May 1957) is a Bahamian former swimmer. He competed in the men's 100 metre breaststroke at the 1976 Summer Olympics.
