= Andy Knowles (swimmer) =

Bahamian swimmer (born 1955)

Andy Knowles OBE
Personal information
- Full name: Percival Andrew Knowles
- Born: 22 March 1955 (age 71) Nassau, Bahamas

Sport
- Sport: Swimming

Percival Andrew Knowles Jr. OBE (born 22 March 1955) is a Bahamian swim coach and former swimmer. He competed in two events at the 1976 Summer Olympics.

== Early life ==
Percival Andrew Knowles Jr was born in Nassau, Bahamas on 22 March 1955, the son of Frances Yvonne (née Ingraham) and Percival Andrew Knowles Sr. His uncle was the Olympian, Durward Knowles.

Knowles began swimming when he was 4. He attended Queen's College, St Andrew's Prep School, and the University of Miami.

== Career ==
Knowles competed for the Bahamas in two events at the 1976 Summer Olympics. At the Montreal Olympics, he and his brother Bruce, became the first Bahamians to represent the country in the pool at Olympic level.

For many years, Knowles was a swim coach at Barracudas Swim Club, one of the country's leading swim clubs, until he established his own swim club, Swift. In addition to Swift, Knowles and his wife also run a charity that partners with government schools and the Royal Bahamas Defence Force to teach students and marines to swim.

Knowles has coached the country's Olympic and Carifta swim teams.

In 2017, he won the 100 and 200 yd freestyle, the 200 yd butterfly and the 200 yd breaststroke in the 60-64 age group at the 2017 Auburn Masters Invitational swim meet.

In 2024, Knowles, his 93 year-old father, 42 year-old son, Olympian Jeremy Knowles, and 14 year-old grandson competed in the National Swimming Championships in the 4 x 50 m team relay in an unprecedented "generations" team.

== Awards and honours ==
In 1973, Knowles was nominated for national sportsman of the year. In 2014, Knowles was inducted into the national sports hall of fame. In 2022, Knowles received a national Order of Merit.

He was appointed an Officer of the Order of the British Empire in the King's New Years Honours for 2026.
