= Graham Smith (Canadian swimmer) =

Canadian swimmer (born 1958)

Personal information
- Full name: Donald Graham Smith
- National team: Canada
- Born: May 9, 1958 (age 68) Edmonton, Alberta, Canada

Sport
- Sport: Swimming
- Strokes: Breaststroke, medley
- Club: South Side Swim Club; Calgary Dinos, Calgary (CAN)
- College team: U. Cal. Berkeley; University of Calgary
- Coach: Nort Thornton (Berkeley); Deryk Snelling (U. of Calgary)
Medal record
Men's swimming
Representing Canada
Olympic Games
Silver medal – second place	1976 Montreal	4x100 m medley
World Championships (LC)
Gold medal – first place	1978 Berlin	200 m medley
Silver medal – second place	1978 Berlin	100 m breaststroke
Pan American Games
Silver medal – second place	1979 San Juan	200 m medley
Silver medal – second place	1979 San Juan	4x100 m medley
Bronze medal – third place	1979 San Juan	100 m breaststroke
Commonwealth Games
Gold medal – first place	1978 Edmonton	100 m breaststroke
Gold medal – first place	1978 Edmonton	200 m breaststroke
Gold medal – first place	1978 Edmonton	200 m medley
Gold medal – first place	1978 Edmonton	400 m medley
Gold medal – first place	1978 Edmonton	4x100 m medley
Gold medal – first place	1978 Edmonton	4x100 m freestyle
Summer Universiade
Gold medal – first place	1977 Sofia	100 m breaststroke
Gold medal – first place	1977 Sofia	200 m breaststroke

Donald Graham Smith (born May 9, 1958) is a Canadian former multi-stroke swimming competitor who swam for the University of California Berkeley, and the University of Calgary and won a silver in the 4x 100-meter freestyle relay at 1976 Montreal Olympics representing Canada. He is a former world record holder. Considered one of Canada's most outstanding swimmers in the 1970s, Smith won 56 gold, 23 silver, and 8 bronze medals during his career in national, world championship and Olympic competitions.

Smith was born May 9, 1958, in Edmonton, Alberta. Part of an athletic family, his brother George and sister Becky also competed in swimming. At ten, he swam for the South Side Swim Club, breaking a national age group record in the 100-meter breaststroke with a time of 1:29.1 in January 1969 at the Alberta Indoor Swimming Championships. Beginning in 1973, he swam for the Canadian National Team. He joined Canada's National Team in 1973.

== Collegiate career ==
In the fall of 1976, Smith began attending the University of California Berkeley where he swam under Hall of Fame Coach Nort Thornton. In December, 1976, as an elite multi-stroke competitor in his Freshman year, he was rated the third fastest in the world in the 100 meter breaststroke, fourth fastest in the 200 meter breaststroke, and eighth fastest in both the 200 and 400 Individual Medley. He became the first Canadian to win an NCAA triple in 1979, taking both three gold medals and a relay title in one year, and leading Berkeley to the NCAA National Championships. Berkeley won the 1980 NCAA team championships again in 1980. During his time at Berkeley, he won an NCAA national swimming championship. Moving closer to home, he completed his education and swam for Hall of Fame Coach Deryk Snelling, at the University of Calgary, where Smith helped lead the Calgary team to additional national titles. Snelling, in his remarkable career, served as a Coach to the Canadian National team at six Olympic games, including four times as Head Coach.

== 1976 Montreal Olympics ==
Smith won a silver medal in the men's 4x100-metre medley relay at the 1976 Summer Olympics in Montreal, Quebec, where his team swam a combined time of 3:45.94. He did so alongside teammates Stephen Pickell, Clay Evans and Gary MacDonald. The Americans, as the heavy favorites, who took the gold in the 4x100 with a world record time of 3:42.22, had already set a new world record in the semi-final round of 3:47.28. In the leadoff backstroke leg, American John Nabor put the American team to an insurmountable lead.

Smith finished fourth in the 100 metre breaststroke with a time of 1:04.26, only .23 seconds away from bronze medal contention. He placed fourth again in the 200 metre breaststroke with a time of 2:19.42, only .22 seconds away from contending for the bronze medal from Rick Collela of the U.S. team. He placed fifth in the 400 metre individual medley with a time of 4:28.64, with Americans claiming both the Gold and Silver medals. Smith's coach at the University of Calgary, Deryk Snelling, served as the Canadian team's head coach in 1976.

== International swimming highlights ==
=== 1978 Commonwealth Games ===
At the 1978 Commonwealth Games in Edmonton, Alberta, Smith became the first competitor to win six gold medals at a single Commonwealth Games; he won the 100- and 200-metre breaststroke, 200- and 400-metre individual medleys, and was part of the winning 4x100-metre freestyle and 4x100-metre medley relay teams. Smith twice broke the world record in the men's 200-metre individual medley (long course).

At the 1979 Summer Pan American Games in San Juan, Puerto Rico, he won silvers in the 200 m medley and 4×100 m medley relay and a bronze medal in the 100 m breaststroke. At the 1977 Summer Universiade in Sofia, he won two gold medals in the 100 and 200 m breaststroke events and a silver in the 4×100 m medley relay. At the 1978 World Aquatics Championships in West Berlin, he won a gold in the 200 m medley, and a silver in the 100 m breaststroke.

He set a Long Course World Record in swimming on in the 200 metre medley in Long Course Swimming of 2:03.56 on 24 August 1978, in West Berlin, Germany.

Taking off a year from college to train for the 1980 Summer Olympics, he lost his chance to participate when the games were boycotted by Canada. Though he had been considered Canada's greatest swimmer, in 1982 he formally left competitive swimming, and served as a coach for several years before earning an MBA from St. Mary’s College of California. In 2013 he owned a consulting firm in British Columbia.

=== Honours ===
Smith was inducted into the Alberta Sports Hall of Fame and Museum in 1978. He was inducted into the Canadian Sports Hall of Fame and the Canadian Aquatic Hall of Fame in 1986, as his countrymen were likely pleased he finished his education and swimming career at the University of Calgary in his native Canada in addition to representing his country so successfully at the 1976 Olympics and international competitions.

== See also ==
- List of Commonwealth Games medallists in swimming (men)
- List of Olympic medalists in swimming (men)
- List of University of California, Berkeley alumni
- World record progression 200 metres individual medley

Records
Preceded by David Wilkie; Steve Lundquist	Men's 200-metre individual medley world record-holder August 23, 1975 – August 4, 1977; August 2 – 24, 1978	Succeeded by Aleksandr Sidorenko; Jesse Vassallo
