= Michael Burton =

Michael, Micky or Mike Burton may refer to:

- Michael Burton (diplomat) (born 1937), British diplomat
- Michael Burton (judge) (born 1946), judge of the High Court of England and Wales
- Michael Burton (American football) (born 1992), NFL player
- Michael Burton (psychologist), psychologist and professor at the University of York
- Michael Burton (astronomer), Northern Irish astronomer
- Micky Burton (born 1969), English professional footballer
- Mike Burton (politician) (born 1941), American politician in Oregon
- Mike Burton (rugby union) (born 1945), former English rugby union footballer
- Mike Burton (swimmer) (1947–2026), American swimmer
- Mike Burton (cricketer) (born 1944), Zimbabwean cricketer
- Michael Burton (politician), American politician and former actor
