= José-Ricardo de Jesús =

Puerto Rican swimmer (born 1960)

Personal information
- Born: May 7, 1960 (age 66)

Sport
- Sport: Swimming
Medal record
Representing Puerto Rico
Central American and Caribbean Games
Gold medal – first place	1978 Medellin	4x100m freestyle relay

José-Ricardo de Jesús (born 7 May 1960) is a Puerto Rican former swimmer who competed in the 1976 Summer Olympics.
