= Edmondo Mingione =

Italian swimmer

Personal information
- Born: 24 October 1952 (age 73) Rome, Italy

Sport
- Sport: Swimming

Edmondo Mingione (born 24 October 1952) is an Italian former swimmer. He competed in the men's 100 metre breaststroke at the 1972 Summer Olympics.
