= Maria Medina (archer) =

Puerto Rican archer (born 1948)

Maria Medina (born 15 July 1948) represented Puerto Rico at the 1976 Summer Olympic Games in archery.

== Olympics ==
Medina competed in the women's individual event, and finished 27th with a score of 1993 points.
