= María Mock =

Puerto Rican swimmer (born 1957)

Personal information
- Born: 7 October 1957 (age 68)

Sport
- Sport: Swimming

María Mock (born 7 October 1957) is a Puerto Rican former swimmer. She competed in four events at the 1976 Summer Olympics.
