= Alejandro Cabrera (swimmer) =

Salvadoran swimmer

Personal information
- Full name: Alejandro Cabrera

Sport
- Sport: Swimming

Alejandro Cabrera is a Salvadoran former swimmer. He competed in the men's 200 metre breaststroke at the 1972 Summer Olympics.
