= Gustavo Salcedo (swimmer) =

Mexican swimmer

Personal information
- Born: 31 March 1952 (age 74)

Sport
- Sport: Swimming

Gustavo Salcedo (born 31 March 1952) is a Mexican former swimmer. He competed in two events at the 1972 Summer Olympics.
