= Viktor Stulikov =

Russian swimmer

Personal information
- Born: 5 March 1954 (age 72)

Sport
- Sport: Swimming

Viktor Stulikov (born 5 March 1954) is a Russian former swimmer. He competed in two events at the 1972 Summer Olympics for the Soviet Union.
