= Karl Christian Koch =

Danish swimmer

Personal information
- Born: 3 April 1952 (age 74) Sønderborg, Denmark

Sport
- Sport: Swimming

Karl Christian Koch (born 3 April 1952) is a Danish former breaststroke swimmer. He competed in two events at the 1972 Summer Olympics.
