= János Tóth (swimmer) =

Hungarian swimmer

Personal information
- Born: 2 March 1955 (age 71) Heves, Hungary

Sport
- Sport: Swimming

János Tóth (born 2 March 1955) is a Hungarian former swimmer. He competed in two events at the 1972 Summer Olympics.
