= Ove Wisløff =

Norwegian swimmer

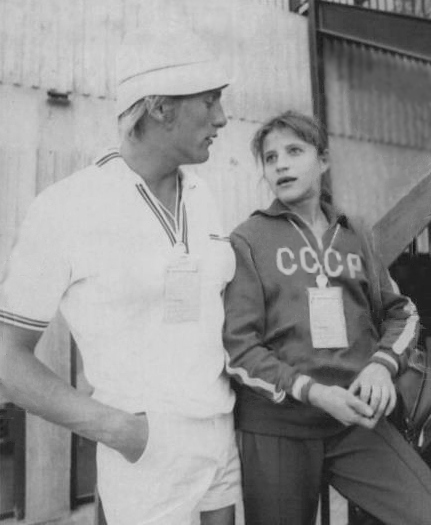
- Wisløff chatting with Olga Korbut at the 1976 Olympics

Personal information
- Born: 20 April 1954 (age 72) Alta, Norway
- Height: 186 cm (6 ft 1 in)
- Weight: 74 kg (163 lb)

Sport
- Sport: Swimming
- Strokes: Breaststroke
- Club: Alta SK

Ove Wisløff (born 20 April 1954) is a Norwegian former breaststroke swimmer. He competed in the 100 m and 200 m events at the 1976 Summer Olympics, and was eliminated in first rounds.
