= Francisco Canales =

Puerto Rican swimmer (born 1957)

Personal information
- Born: July 20, 1957 (age 69)

Sport
- Sport: Swimming
- College team: Harvard Crimson

Francisco "Paco" Luis Canales (born 20 July 1957) is a Puerto Rican former swimmer who competed in the 1976 Summer Olympics. He competed for Harvard College, after graduating from Colegio San Ignacio de Loyola (San Juan).
