= Klaus Katzur =

East German swimmer (1943–2016)

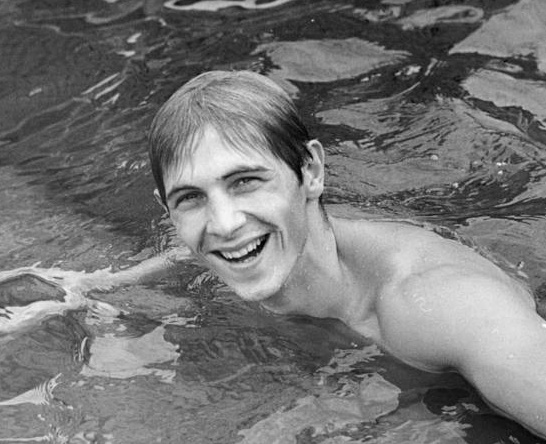
- Klaus Katzur in 1969

Personal information
- Born: 26 August 1943 Potsdam, Germany
- Died: 4 September 2016 (aged 73)
- Height: 1.90 m (6 ft 3 in)
- Weight: 85 kg (187 lb)

Sport
- Sport: Swimming
- Club: ASK Vorwärts Rostock
Medal record
Representing East Germany
Olympic Games
Silver medal – second place	1972 Munich	4×100 m medley
European Championships
Bronze medal – third place	1966 Utrecht	400 m medley
Gold medal – first place	1970 Barcelona	4×100 m medley
Gold medal – first place	1970 Barcelona	200 m breaststroke

Klaus Katzur (26 August 1943 – 4 September 2016) was a German swimmer who competed in the 1964, 1968, and 1972 Summer Olympics. In 1972, he won a silver medal in the 4 × 100 metre medley relay and finished eighth in the 200 metre breaststroke. Two years earlier, he won two gold medals in these events at the 1970 European Aquatics Championships. Between 1963 and 1972, he won 13 national titles in breaststroke, freestyle, and medley events.
