= Rudi Vingerhoets =

Belgian swimmer

Personal information
- Born: 3 May 1958 (age 68)

Sport
- Sport: Swimming

Rudi Vingerhoets (born 3 May 1958) is a Belgian former breaststroke swimmer. He competed in two events at the 1972 Summer Olympics.
