= Andreas Hellmann =

German swimmer

Personal information
- Born: 18 April 1952 (age 74) Augsburg, West Germany

Sport
- Sport: Swimming

Andreas Hellmann (born 18 April 1952) is a German former swimmer. He competed in two events at the 1972 Summer Olympics.
