= Rainer Hradetzky =

German swimmer

Personal information
- Born: 26 September 1952 (age 73) Berlin, Germany

Sport
- Sport: Swimming

Rainer Hradetzky (born 26 September 1952) is a German former swimmer. He competed in two events at the 1972 Summer Olympics.
