= Jean-Pierre Dubey =

Swiss swimmer

Personal information
- Born: 11 January 1951 (age 75)

Sport
- Sport: Swimming

Jean-Pierre Dubey (born 11 January 1951) is a Swiss former breaststroke swimmer. He competed in two events at the 1972 Summer Olympics.
