= Guðjón Guðmundsson =

Icelandic swimmer

Personal information
- Born: 6 January 1952 (age 74) Akranes, Iceland

Sport
- Sport: Swimming

Guðjón Guðmundsson (born 6 January 1952) is an Icelandic former breaststroke swimmer. He competed in two events at the 1972 Summer Olympics and was Icelandic Sportsperson of the Year for that year.
