= Tuomo Kerola =

Finnish swimmer

Personal information
- Born: 10 August 1957 Kokkola, Finland
- Died: 26 May 2006 (aged 48) Oulu, Finland

Sport
- Sport: Swimming

Tuomo Kerola (10 August 1957 – 26 May 2006) was a Finnish breaststroke swimmer. He competed in two events at the 1976 Summer Olympics.
