= Robert Stoddart =

Canadian swimmer

Personal information
- Born: 16 February 1950 (age 76) St. Catharines, Ontario, Canada

Sport
- Sport: Swimming

Robert Stoddart (born 16 February 1950) is a Canadian former swimmer. He competed in two events at the 1972 Summer Olympics.
