= Sokhon Yi =

Cambodian swimmer

Personal information
- Born: 1 April 1951 (age 75)

Sport
- Sport: Swimming
Medal record
Representing Khmer Republic
SEA Games
Gold medal – first place	1973 Singapore	100m breaststroke
Gold medal – first place	1973 Singapore	200m breaststroke
Silver medal – second place	1971 Kuala Lumpur	200m breaststroke
Silver medal – second place	1973 Singapore	4x100m medley relay

Sokhon Yi (born 1 April 1951) is a Cambodian former breaststroke swimmer. He competed in three events at the 1972 Summer Olympics.
