= John Daly (swimmer) =

Puerto Rican swimmer (born 1956)

Personal information
- Born: August 7, 1956 (age 69)

Sport
- Sport: Swimming

John Daly (born 7 August 1956) is a Puerto Rican former swimmer who competed in the 1976 Summer Olympics.
