= Angel Chakarov =

Bulgarian swimmer (born 1950)

Personal information
- Born: 31 August 1950 (age 75) Varna, Bulgaria

Sport
- Sport: Swimming

Angel Chakarov (Bulgarian: Ангел Чакъров; born 31 August 1950) is a Bulgarian former breaststroke and medley swimmer. He competed at the 1968 Summer Olympics and the 1972 Summer Olympics.
