= Sándor Szabó (swimmer) =

Hungarian swimmer (1951–2021)

Personal information
- Nationality: Hungarian
- Born: 29 March 1951 Budapest, Hungary
- Died: 17 April 2021 (aged 70) Törökbálint, Hungary

Sport
- Sport: Swimming

Sándor Szabó (29 March 1951 – 17 April 2021) was a Hungarian swimmer. He competed at the 1968 Summer Olympics and the 1972 Summer Olympics.
