= Nobutaka Taguchi =

Japanese swimmer (born 1951)

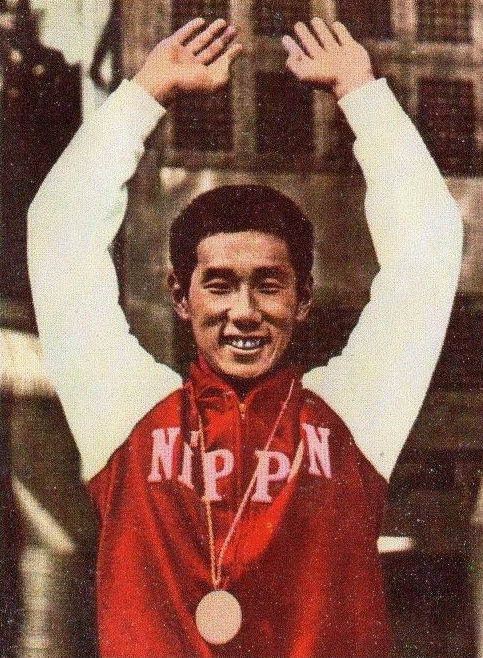

Personal information
- Born: June 18, 1951 (age 75) Saijō, Ehime, Japan
- Height: 1.73 m (5 ft 8 in)
- Weight: 68 kg (150 lb)

Sport
- Sport: Swimming
Medal record
Representing Japan
Olympic Games
Gold medal – first place	1972 Munich	100 m breaststroke
Bronze medal – third place	1972 Munich	200 m breaststroke
World Championships (LC)
Silver medal – second place	1975 Cali	100 m breaststroke
Bronze medal – third place	1973 Belgrade	100 m breaststroke
Bronze medal – third place	1973 Belgrade	200 m breaststroke
Asian Games
Gold medal – first place	1970 Bangkok	100 m breaststroke
Gold medal – first place	1970 Bangkok	200 m breaststroke
Gold medal – first place	1970 Bangkok	4×100 m medley
Gold medal – first place	1974 Tehran	100 m breaststroke
Gold medal – first place	1974 Tehran	200 m breaststroke
Gold medal – first place	1974 Tehran	4×100 m medley
Universiade
Silver medal – second place	1970 Turin	100 m breaststroke
Bronze medal – third place	1970 Turin	200 m breaststroke

Nobutaka Taguchi (田口信教, Taguchi Nobutaka; born June 18, 1951) is a retired Japanese breaststroke swimmer. He competed in the 100 m and 200 m breaststroke and 4 × 100 m medley relay at the 1968, 1972 and 1976 Olympics and won two medals in 1972, a gold in the 100 m and a bronze in the 200 m events. His breaststroke gold medal was the first for Japan since 1956. He won during the five-year era dominated by John Hencken and David Wilkie. He also earned the bronze medal in the 200 m breaststroke at the 1972 Olympics and in both breaststrokes at the 1975 World Championships. He ended his career after the 1976 Olympics.

== Later life ==
In 1987 he was inducted into the International Swimming Hall of Fame.

He became a lecturer at the National Institute of Fitness and Sports in Kanoya in 1984, and a professor of physical education in 1993. He became professor emeritus in 2017.

== See also ==
- List of members of the International Swimming Hall of Fame
