= Roger-Philippe Menu =

French swimmer

Personal information
- Born: 30 June 1948
- Died: February 4, 2013 (aged 64) Lille, France
- Height: 1.87 m (6 ft 2 in)
- Weight: 83 kg (183 lb)

Sport
- Sport: Swimming
- Club: Amiens AC
Medal record
Representing France
European Championships
Silver medal – second place	1970 Barcelona	100 m breaststroke
Silver medal – second place	1970 Barcelona	4×100 m medley

Roger-Philippe Menu (30 June 1948 – 4 February 2013 in Lille) is a retired French swimmer who won two silver medals in the 4 × 100 m medley relay and 100 m breaststroke at the 1970 European Aquatics Championships; he finished sixth in the 200 m breaststroke. He also competed in these three events at the 1972 Summer Olympics, but did not reach the finals.
