= Alfredo Hunger =

Peruvian swimmer (born 1955)

Personal information
- Born: 3 January 1955 (age 71) Lima, Peru

Sport
- Sport: Swimming

Alfredo Hunger (born 3 January 1955) is a Peruvian former breaststroke swimmer. He competed in two events at the 1972 Summer Olympics.
