= Zdravko Divjak =

Yugoslav swimmer

Personal information
- Born: 30 May 1956 (age 70) Bjelovar, Yugoslavia

Sport
- Sport: Swimming

Zdravko Divjak (born 30 May 1956) is a Yugoslav former swimmer. He competed in two events at the 1976 Summer Olympics.
