= Gustavo Lozano (swimmer) =

Mexican swimmer (born 1951)

Personal information
- Born: 6 October 1951 (age 74)

Sport
- Sport: Swimming
Medal record
Men's swimming
Representing Mexico
Pan American Games
Bronze medal – third place	1975 Mexico City	200 m breaststroke

Gustavo Lozano (born 6 October 1951) is a Mexican former swimmer. He competed in three events at the 1976 Summer Olympics.
