= John Hencken =

American swimmer (born 1954)

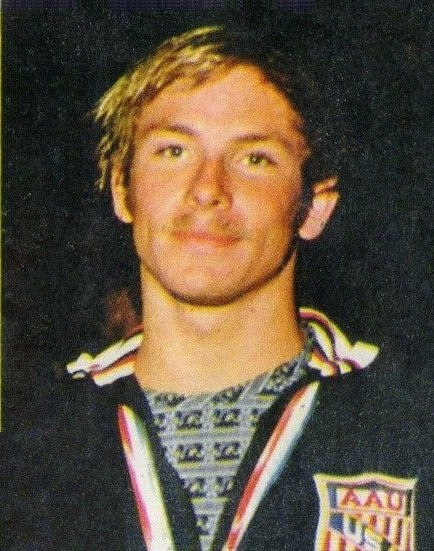
- Hencken circa 1974

Personal information
- Full name: John Frederick Hencken
- National team: United States
- Born: May 29, 1954 (age 72) Culver City, California, U.S.
- Height: 6 ft 0 in (183 cm)
- Weight: 170 lb (77 kg)

Sport
- Sport: Swimming
- Strokes: Breaststroke
- Club: Santa Clara Swim Club
- College team: Stanford University
- Coach: Jim Gaughran (Stanford)
Medal record
Representing the United States
Olympic Games
Gold medal – first place	1972 Munich	200 m breaststroke
Bronze medal – third place	1972 Munich	100 m breaststroke
Gold medal – first place	1976 Montreal	100 m breaststroke
Gold medal – first place	1976 Montreal	4×100 m medley
Silver medal – second place	1976 Montreal	200 m breaststroke
World Championships (LC)
Gold medal – first place	1973 Belgrade	100 m breaststroke
Gold medal – first place	1973 Belgrade	4×100 m medley
Silver medal – second place	1973 Belgrade	200 m breaststroke

John Frederick Hencken (born May 29, 1954) is an American former competition swimmer for Stanford University, three-time Olympic champion, and former world record-holder primarily in the 100 and 200 meter breaststroke events. Hencken won five Olympic medals during his career in the 1972 Munich, and 1976 Montreal Olympics, including three golds.

== Early swimming ==
Hencken was born in Culver City, California, and began swimming to recover from an operation he had to remove a growth behind his knee. By 15, he lived in Kensington, California in the greater San Francisco area, where he swam for the Berkeley YMCA. At 16, Hencken set a National Junior Olympics record of 1:01.7 in the 100-yard breaststroke, though he had already broken a minute in the event, and had swum the 200-yard breaststroke in 2:14.6, just a second short of the Junior Olympic record.

By 1970-71, he swam for Cupertino's Cupertino High School, in central Western California, graduating in 1972. By 1971, he did much of his more intensive training and competition with the Santa Clara Swim Club, about ten miles Northeast of Cupertino. He swam, though not continuously, for the Santa Clara Club from 1969 to 1980. Santa Clara Club was an age group team under Hall of fame Coach George Haines, who trained 26 future Olympians at Santa Clara including future Olympic medalists Mark Spitz, Greg Buckingham, Don Schollander, and Donna deVarona. Swimming for Cupertino High as a Senior in 1972, Hencken set a school record of 22.2 in the 50 freestyle, and swam a 1:00.9 in the 100 breast stroke, the best time in his central coast high school section.

== Stanford University ==
Coach Gaughran

Hencken attended and swam for Stanford University under Hall of Fame Coach Jim Gaughran beginning in 1972, majoring in general engineering and product design, and graduated in 1977. He later completed his MBA at the University of Phoenix.

During his years swimming for Stanford, Hencken won five NCAA titles in his signature stroke, with three in the 100-yard breast and two in the 200-yard breast events. Hencken won the 100 and 200-yard Conference championship titles seven out of a possible eight times in his four years of collegiate competition.

== Olympic career ==
At the 1972 Olympic trials in early August in Chicago, Hencken set an American record of 1:05.998 in the 100-meter breaststroke, and a World Record of 2:23.79 in the 200-meter breast stroke. At the 1972 Summer Olympics in Munich, Germany, he won a gold medal in the 200-meter breaststroke with a world record time of 2:21.55, breaking his former record of 2:22.8 and a bronze medal in the 100-meter breaststroke.

Four years later at the 1976 Summer Olympics in Montreal, Canada, Hencken won a gold medal in the 100-meter breaststroke with a world record time of 1:03.11. He also took a gold swimming with the 4×100-meter medley relay with a world record time of 3:42.22, and a silver in the 200-meter breaststroke with an American record time of 2:17.26. Each of the four swimmers for the gold-medal winning US 4x100 medley team recorded the swiftest individual time in the event final for their leg, with John Naber taking a significant lead in his opening backstroke leg.

Hencken set another world record in the 1975 World Championships, placing first in the 100-meter breaststroke. During his career Hencken set 21 American and 13 world records. He won 14 American Athletic Union National titles.

=== Honors ===
Hencken was inducted into the International Swimming Hall of Fame as an Honor swimmer. Qualifying in 1972, 1976, and 1980, he remains the only swimmer to ever qualify for three Olympic teams in the 100 meter and 200 meter breaststroke. He was also inducted into the Stanford University Hall of Fame in the 1980s, where in 2016 he was named All-Century. He was elected to the Santa Clara International Swim Center Hall Of Fame in July 1998.

== See also ==
- List of members of the International Swimming Hall of Fame
- List of multiple Olympic gold medalists
- List of Olympic medalists in swimming (men)
- List of Stanford University people
- List of World Aquatics Championships medalists in swimming (men)
- World record progression 100 metres breaststroke
- World record progression 200 metres breaststroke
- World record progression 4 × 100 metres medley relay
