= Carlos Nazario =

Puerto Rican swimmer (born 1958)

Personal information
- Born: June 17, 1958 (age 68)

Sport
- Sport: Swimming
- Strokes: Breaststroke

Carlos Nazario (born 17 June 1958) is a former Puerto Rican swimmer who competed in the 1976 Summer Olympics.

He is married to Rosa A. Nazario who also swam for Puerto Rico. Together they have a daughter named Carla Michelle Nazario.
