= David Wilkie (swimmer) =

Scottish swimmer (1954–2024)

David Wilkie MBE
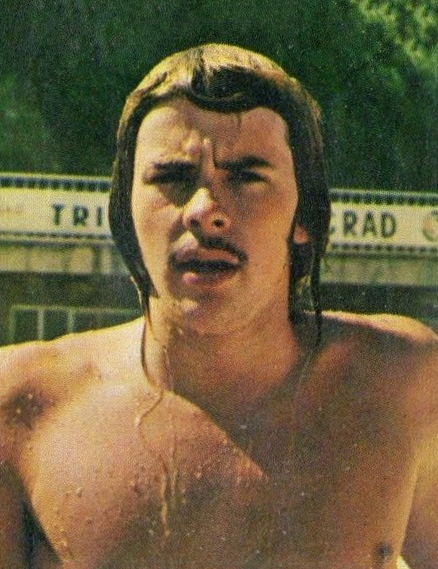
- Wilkie in 1974

Personal information
- Full name: David Andrew Wilkie
- National team: Great Britain
- Born: 8 March 1954 Colombo, Ceylon
- Died: 22 May 2024 (aged 70)
- Height: 1.82 m (6 ft 0 in)
- Weight: 76 kg (168 lb)

Sport
- Sport: Swimming
- Strokes: Medley, breaststroke
- Club: Warrender Baths Club
- College team: University of Miami
- Coach: Bill Diaz; University of Miami
Medal record
Representing Great Britain
Olympic Games
Gold medal – first place	1976 Montreal	200 m breast
Silver medal – second place	1972 Munich	200 m breast
Silver medal – second place	1976 Montreal	100 m breast
World Championships
Gold medal – first place	1973 Belgrade	200 m breast
Gold medal – first place	1975 Cali	100 m breast
Gold medal – first place	1975 Cali	200 m breast
Bronze medal – third place	1973 Belgrade	200 m medley
Bronze medal – third place	1975 Cali	4×100 m medley
European Championships
Gold medal – first place	1974 Vienna	200 m breast
Gold medal – first place	1974 Vienna	200 m medley
Silver medal – second place	1974 Vienna	4×100 m medley
Representing Scotland
British Commonwealth Games
Gold medal – first place	1974 Christchurch	200 m breast
Gold medal – first place	1974 Christchurch	200 m medley
Silver medal – second place	1974 Christchurch	100 m breast
Bronze medal – third place	1970 Edinburgh	200 m breast

David Andrew Wilkie MBE (8 March 1954 – 22 May 2024) was a Scottish swimmer who was the Olympic 200m breaststroke champion in 1976, the first British swimmer to win an Olympic gold medal since Anita Lonsbrough in 1960, and the first British man to do so since Henry Taylor in 1908. He is the only person to have held British, Commonwealth, European, World and Olympic swimming titles at the same time. Wilkie, a member of the Scottish Sports Hall of Fame and the International Swimming Hall of Fame, has been described as Scotland's greatest and Britain's finest swimmer. Fellow Olympic breaststroke gold medallist Duncan Goodhew considered him an "extraordinary talent" and "one of Britain's greatest ever athletes".

== Early days ==
David Wilkie's parents came from Aberdeen, Scotland, but were stationed in Colombo, Ceylon, when Wilkie was born on 8 March 1954. His family regularly patronised the open air Colombo Swimming Club, where Wilkie learned to swim.

When he was 11 years old his parents sent him to Scotland as a boarding school pupil at Daniel Stewart's College in Edinburgh, and, while a pupil there, he joined the Warrender Baths Club, one of Scotland's most successful swimming clubs. It was there that he began to train intensively and develop his specialist stroke, the breaststroke under one of Britain's leading coaches Frank Thomas, whom Wilkie credited with giving him the motivation to become a world class swimmer. In 1969, Wilkie was chosen to join the elite Scottish Training Squad organised by the Scottish Amateur Swimming Association.

== National and international success ==
In 1969, Wilkie swam representing Britain for the first time in an international swimming contest, where he came up against the Russian 200-metre breaststroke world record-holder Nikolai Pankin.

Wilkie broke the British record for the 200-metre breaststroke in an international match against Denmark in July 1970. He then won a bronze medal in front of his home crowd in the 1970 Commonwealth Games in Edinburgh in the 200-metre breaststroke breaking his own British record again. He wore a swim cap for that event during the Commonwealth Games, making him the first elite swimmer to wear one in a major competition.

In 1970, the Scottish Amateur Swimming Association awarded Wilkie the Nancy Riach Memorial Medal Award (awarded to the person who has the done the most to enhance or uphold the prestige of Scottish Swimming during the year) and the W.G. Todd Cup and Prize (Junior Swimmer of the Year). This was the first time in the Association's history that both awards had gone to the same person in the same year. Wilkie continued to hold the Nancy Riach award every year from 1972 to 1976.

At the Scottish national long course championships in 1972, Wilkie won five events. However Wilkie's world breakthrough came when he won silver in the 200-metre breaststroke at the 1972 Summer Olympics in Munich, Germany, in a European record time of 2:23:67 in spite of being ranked only 25th in the world. He also broke the Scottish record times for the 100-metre breaststroke and the 200-metre individual medley.

Starting in 1973, Wilkie was studying and swimming in the United States. He won the World Championship for 200-metre breaststroke in Belgrade, Yugoslavia, and broke the world record.

At the 1974 Commonwealth Games in Christchurch, New Zealand, he won a gold in the 200-metre breaststroke, a second gold in the 200-metre individual medley, and a silver in the 100-metre breaststroke. Also in 1974 at the European Championships in Vienna, Austria, he won a gold in the 200-metre individual medley in a world record time. He also won gold for the 200-metre breaststroke and silver as a member of the British 4x100-metre medley relay team. From 1972 to 1976 he was unbeaten in 200-metre breaststroke races.

== Olympic gold ==
However, it was after several years of further intensive training, while studying at the University of Miami on an athletic scholarship and competing for the university's Miami Hurricanes swimming and diving team, that Wilkie's finest hour came. He won gold in the 200-metre breaststroke at the 1976 Summer Olympics in Montreal, in a world-record time of 2:15:11 and preventing an American sweep of the men's swimming gold medals. He also added a 100-metre silver medal to his collection in a time of 1:03:43. His world record was to remain unbroken for six years.

Wilkie won three Amateur Athletic Union (AAU) National US Championships and three NCAA Men's Swimming and Diving Championships (NCAA) US college championships while at Miami, was four times All-American and was inducted into the University of Miami Sports Hall of Fame in 1987. The head swimming coach there was Bill Diaz and his individual coach was Charlie Hodgson.

He was European Swimmer of the Year three times, British Sports personality of the year in 1975, in 1977 he was appointed Member of the Order of the British Empire, in 1982 he was inducted into the International Swimming Hall of Fame and in 2002 was inducted into the Scottish Sports Hall of Fame.

== After competitive swimming ==
Following his retirement a month after the Olympics, Wilkie remained active in the world of swimming, involved in swimming aids and technology. He was said to be the first swimmer to wear a head-cap and goggles together in competition to improve the streamline effect within the water although he also said he wore the goggles because of an allergy to chlorine in the water and the cap to keep his long hair in.

Wilkie co-founded a healthcare company called Health Perception (UK) Ltd. in 1986. It was sold to William Ransom and Son plc in 2004 for £7.8 million. In 1985 he married his Swedish partner Helen Isacson with whom he had two children, Natasha and Adam, who were 23 and 20 in 2013, and Adam later became a swimmer. In 2009 he helped found Pet's Kitchen, a pet food company supplying British supermarkets.

In an interview with bunkered.co.uk in April 2016, Wilkie criticised the re-introduction of golf to the Olympic Games. He called Jack Nicklaus and Gary Player's claims that the Olympics would grow the game globally as "absolute bullshit", while he also said that players who did not stay in Rio de Janeiro for the duration of the Games could not be classed as true Olympians.

=== "The David Wilkie problem" ===
In 2017, BBC News reported that Wilkie (then aged 62) "was accused of swimming too fast" in his local Virgin Active swimming pool. Wilkie quit his Virgin Active membership and joined another gym. Outdoor Swimmer magazine subsequently coined the phrase "the David Wilkie problem", meaning "the issue of how swimming pools manage their facilities to provide swimmers with a wide range of abilities, aspirations and expectations the best possible experience. The fact that 'lane rage' exists suggests that currently, they don't do a very good job of it."

== Death ==
Wilkie died of cancer on 22 May 2024, at the age of 70.

== Books ==
- David Wilkie by David Wilkie, Pat Besford and Tommy Long, Kemps, 1976; ISBN 978-0905255224
- Winning with Wilkie: A Guide to Better Swimming by David Wilkie and Athole Still, Stanley Paul, 1977. ISBN 978-0091295516.
- Splash!: Swimming with Wilkie by David Wilkie and Kelvin Juba, Hutchinson, 1982. ISBN 978-0091502805.
- The Handbook of Swimming by David Wilkie and Kelvin Juba, Pelham, 1986. ISBN 978-0720715903.

== See also ==
- List of Commonwealth Games medallists in swimming (men)
- List of Olympic medalists in swimming (men)
- World record progression 200 metres breaststroke
- World record progression 200 metres individual medley

Records
Preceded by Gunnar Larsson	Men's 200-metre individual medley world record-holder (long course); 24 August 1974 – 23 August 1975	Succeeded by Bruce Furniss
Preceded by John Hencken	Men's 200-metre breaststroke world record-holder (long course); 6 September 1973 – 24 August 1974	Succeeded by John Hencken
Preceded by John Hencken	Men's 200-metre breaststroke world record-holder (long course); 24 July 1976 – 5 August 1982	Succeeded by Victor Davis
