= Walter Kusch =

German swimmer

Personal information
- Born: 31 May 1954 (age 72) Hildesheim, Lower Saxony, West Germany

Sport
- Sport: Swimming
- Strokes: Breaststroke
Medal record
Men's swimming
Representing West Germany
Olympic Games
Bronze medal – third place	1976 Montreal	4×100 m medley
World Championships (LC)
Gold medal – first place	1978 West Berlin	100 m breaststroke
Silver medal – second place	1975 Cali	4×100 m medley
Silver medal – second place	1978 West Berlin	4×100 m medley
Bronze medal – third place	1978 West Berlin	200 m breaststroke
European Championships (LC)
Gold medal – first place	1974 Vienna	4×100 m medley
Silver medal – second place	1974 Vienna	100 m breaststroke
Bronze medal – third place	1970 Barcelona	200 m breaststroke
Bronze medal – third place	1977 Jönköping	100 m breaststroke
Bronze medal – third place	1977 Jönköping	200 m breaststroke

Walter Kusch (born 31 May 1954 in Hildesheim) is a German former swimmer who competed in the 1972 Summer Olympics and in the 1976 Summer Olympics.

Kusch was the subject of Young Europe (Junges Europa), a sculpture by German artist Arno Breker which depicted the head of a hawk atop the body of a man, modeled on Kusch.
