= Steffen Kriechbaum =

Austrian swimmer

Personal information
- Born: 3 January 1947 (age 79) Chemnitz, Germany

Sport
- Sport: Swimming

Steffen Kriechbaum (born 3 January 1947) is an Austrian former breaststroke swimmer. He competed at the 1972 Summer Olympics and the 1976 Summer Olympics.
