= Cezary Śmiglak =

Polish swimmer

Personal information
- Born: 13 April 1953 (age 73) Poznań, Polish People's Republic

Sport
- Sport: Swimming

Cezary Śmiglak (born 13 April 1953) is a Polish former breaststroke swimmer. He competed at the 1972 Summer Olympics and the 1976 Summer Olympics.
