= Nikolai Pankin =

Russian swimmer and swimming coach

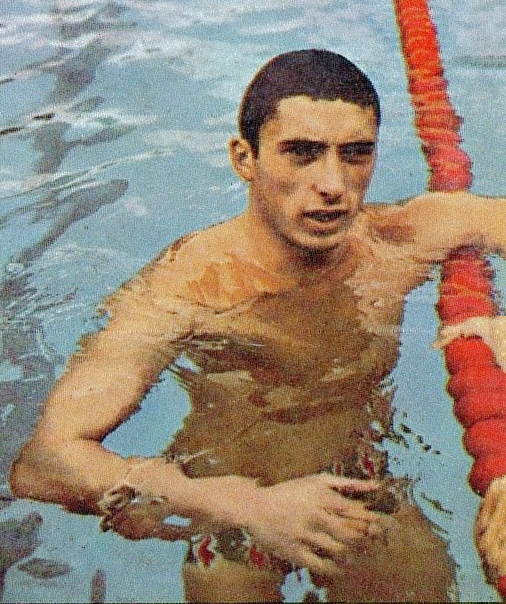

Personal information
- Born: 2 January 1949 Moscow, Soviet Union
- Died: 13 October 2018 (aged 69) Murom, Russia
- Height: 1.78 m (5 ft 10 in)
- Weight: 74 kg (163 lb)

Sport
- Sport: Swimming
- Club: Lokomotiv Moscow
Medal record
Representing the Soviet Union
Olympic Games
Bronze medal – third place	1968 Mexico City	100 m breaststroke
World Championships (LC)
Bronze medal – third place	1975 Cali	200 m breaststroke
European Championships (LC)
Gold medal – first place	1970 Barcelona	100 m breaststroke
Silver medal – second place	1970 Barcelona	200 m breaststroke
Bronze medal – third place	1970 Barcelona	4×100 m medley
Gold medal – first place	1974 Vienna	100 m breaststroke
Silver medal – second place	1974 Vienna	200 m breaststroke
Bronze medal – third place	1974 Vienna	4×100 m medley
Summer Universiade
Gold medal – first place	1970 Turin	100 m breaststroke
Silver medal – second place	1970 Turin	200 m breaststroke
Gold medal – first place	1973 Moscow	100 m breaststroke
Gold medal – first place	1973 Moscow	200 m breaststroke

Nikolai Ivanovich Pankin (Russian: Николай Иванович Панкин; born 2 January 1949 – 13 October 2018) was a Russian breaststroke swimmer and swimming coach. He competed at the 1968, 1972 and 1976 Olympics in the 100 m and 200 m breaststroke and 4 × 100 m medley relay. In 1968 he won a bronze medal in the 100 m and narrowly missed a bronze in the 200 m; he also swam the semifinal for the Soviet medley relay team that won a bronze medal. Pankin was less successful in 1972 and 1976, and finished close to the podium in the medley relay.

At the 1970 and 1974 European Championships, Pankin won a medal in each of the three events he competed. His last international medal was a bronze in the 200 m breaststroke at the 1975 World Championships. During his career, Pankin set four world records, two in the 100 m (1:06.2 in 1968 and 1:05.8 in 1969) and two in the 200 m (2:26.5 and 2:25.4 in 1969). Domestically, he won 13 titles, in the 100 m (1969, 1971, 1974–75), 200 m (1969, 1971, 1972, 1974–75) and in the medley relay (1965, 1969, 1973 and 1975). He retired after the 1976 Olympics and then had a long career as a swimming coach in Moscow. His trainees included Dmitry Volkov.

== See also ==
- World record progression 200 metres breaststroke
