= Brazil at the 1976 Summer Olympics =

- IOC code: BRA
- NOC: Brazilian Olympic Committee

in Montreal
- Competitors: 93 (86 men and 7 women) in 12 sports
- Flag bearer: João Carlos de Oliveira
- Medals Ranked 36th: Gold 0 Silver 0 Bronze 2 Total 2

Summer Olympics appearances (overview)
- 1920; 1924; 1928; 1932; 1936; 1948; 1952; 1956; 1960; 1964; 1968; 1972; 1976; 1980; 1984; 1988; 1992; 1996; 2000; 2004; 2008; 2012; 2016; 2020; 2024; 2028

Brazil competed at the 1976 Summer Olympics in Montreal, Quebec, Canada. 93 competitors, 86 men and 7 women, took part in 48 events in 12 sports. Brazilians athletes obtained two bronze medals, repeating the same performance of the 1972 Summer Olympics. The sailors, Reinaldo Conrad and Peter Ficker, won the medal in Flying Dutchman. It was the second bronze medal conquered by Reinaldo Conrad after the 1968 Olympics. The jumper João Carlos de Oliveira won the medal in men's triple jump. He was the current record holder from altitude at the 1975 Pan American Games in Mexico City. The winner was two time defending champion Viktor Saneyev from Soviet Union.

== Medalists ==
Medal	Name	Sport	Event	Date
Bronze	Reinaldo Conrad; Peter Ficker	Sailing	Flying Dutchman	July 27
Bronze	João Carlos de Oliveira	Athletics	Men's triple jump	July 30

Medals by sport
Sport	1st place, gold medalist(s)	2nd place, silver medalist(s)	3rd place, bronze medalist(s)	Total
Sailing	0	0	1	1
Athletics	0	0	1	1
Total	0	0	2	2

Medals by gender
Gender	1st place, gold medalist(s)	2nd place, silver medalist(s)	3rd place, bronze medalist(s)	Total
Male	0	0	2	2
Female	0	0	0	0
Mixed	0	0	0	0
Total	0	0	2	2

== Athletics ==
Men
Track & road events

Athlete	Event	Heat		Quarterfinal		Semifinal		Final	
Athlete	Event	Result	Rank	Result	Rank	Result	Rank	Result	Rank
Rui da Silva	100 m	10.61	3 Q	10.57	4 Q	10.54	7	did not advance	
Rui da Silva	200 m	20.99	2 Q	20.76	3 Q	21.01	3 Q	20.84	5
José Andrade da Silva	5000 m	DNS		did not advance					
Delmo da Silva	400 m	47.21	2 Q	46.48	4 Q	46.69	8	did not advance	

Field events

Athlete	Event	Qualification		Final	
Athlete	Event	Distance	Position	Distance	Position
Irajá Chedid Cecy	High jump	NM		did not advance	
João Carlos de Oliveira	Long jump	7.87m	6 Q	8.00	5
João Carlos de Oliveira	Triple jump	16.81	1 Q	16.90	Bronze
Nélson Prudêncio	Triple jump	16.22	14	did not advance	

Women
Track & road events

Athlete	Event	Heat		Quarterfinal		Semifinal		Final	
Athlete	Event	Result	Rank	Result	Rank	Result	Rank	Result	Rank
Esmeralda de Jesus Garcia	100 m	11.80	4 Q	11.77	7	did not advance			
Silvina Pereira da Silva	200 m	24.00	6	did not advance					

Field events

Athlete	Event	Qualification		Final	
Athlete	Event	Distance	Position	Distance	Position
Maria Luísa Betioli	High jump	1.75	25	did not advance	
Silvina Pereira da Silva	Long jump	6.13	16	did not advance	

== Boxing ==
Men

Athlete	Event	1 Round	2 Round	3 Round	Quarterfinals	Semifinals	Final	
Athlete	Event	Opposition Result	Opposition Result	Opposition Result	Opposition Result	Opposition Result	Opposition Result	Rank
Antonio Filho	Flyweight	BYE	Leszek Błażyński (POL); L KO-2	did not advance				
Raimundo Alves	Featherweight	BYE	Juan Paredes (MEX); L 0-5	did not advance				
Francisco de Jesus	Light welterweight	Girmaye Gabre (ETH); W WO	BYE	Ulrich Beyer (GDR); L 0-5	did not advance			
Fernando Martins	Middleweight	BYE	Matouk Elsadek (LIB); W WO	—N/a	Alec Năstac (ROU); L 2-3	did not advance		5

== Diving ==
Men

Athlete	Event	Preliminary		Final	
Athlete	Event	Points	Rank	Total	Rank
Milton Machado	10 m platform	424.68	21	did not advance	

== Fencing ==
One male fencer represented Brazil in 1976.

Men

Ranks given are within the pool.

Fencer	Event	Round 1		Round 2		Elimination round I	Elimination round II	Repechage round I	Repechage round II	Repechage Final	Final
Fencer	Event	Result	Rank	Result	Rank	Opposition Result	Opposition Result	Opposition Result	Opposition Result	Result	Rank
Arthur Ribeiro	Men's épée	2-2	4	did not advance							

== Football ==
=== First round ===
==== Group A ====
Team	Pld	W	D	L	GF	GA	GD	Pts
Brazil	2	1	1	0	2	1	+1	3
East Germany	2	1	1	0	1	0	+1	3
Spain	2	0	0	2	1	3	−2	0

- **Nigeria withdrew
July 18, 1976
12:00

Brazil	0 – 0	East Germany
	Report

Varsity Stadium, Toronto
Attendance: 21.643
Referee: John Paterson (United Kingdom)

July 20, 1976
12:00

Brazil	2 – 1	Spain
Rosemiro 7'; Chico Fraga 47' (pen.)	Report	Idígoras 14'

Olympic Stadium, Montreal
Attendance: 38.123
Referee: Paul Schiller (Austria)

=== Quarter-finals ===
July 25, 1976
12:00

Brazil	4 – 1	Israel
Jarbas 56' 74'; Erivélto 72'; Júnior 88'	Report	Peretz 80'

Varsity Stadium, Toronto
Attendance: 18.601
Referee: Károly Palotai (Hungary)

=== Semi-finals ===
July 27, 1976
12:00

Poland	2 – 0	Brazil
Szarmach 51' 82'	Report

Varsity Stadium, Toronto
Attendance: 21.743
Referee: John Paterson (United Kingdom)

=== Bronze Medal match ===
July 29, 1976

Soviet Union	2 – 0	Brazil
Onishcenko 5'; Nazarenko 49'	Report

Olympic Stadium, Montreal
Attendance: 55.647
Referee: Abraham Klein (Israel)
- Team Roster
  - (1) Carlos
  - (2) Rosemiro
  - (3) Tecão
  - (4) Edinho
  - (5) Júnior
  - (6) Alberto
  - (7) Marinho
  - (8) Batista
  - (9) Eudes
  - (10) Erivelto
  - (11) Santos
  - (12) Mauro
  - (13) Julinho
  - (14) Chico Fraga
  - (15) Jarbas
  - (16) Edval
  - (17) Zé Carlos
- Coach: Cláudio Coutinho

== Judo ==
Men

Athlete	Event	Round 1	Round 2	Round 3	Round 4	Repechage 1	Repechage 2	Repechage 3	Semifinal	Final / BM	
Athlete	Event	Opposition Result	Opposition Result	Opposition Result	Opposition Result	Opposition Result	Opposition Result	Opposition Result	Opposition Result	Opposition Result	Rank
Roberto Machusso	−70 kg	Yonah Melnik (ISR); W 1000-0000	Lee Chang-sun (KOR); L 0000-0001	did not advance							13
Carlos Motta	−80 kg	Assane N'Done (SEN); W 1000-0000	Brian Jacks (GBR); L 0000-0001	did not advance							13
Carlos Pacheco	−93 kg	Mario Vecchi (ITA); W 0001-0000	José Ibanez Gomes (CUB); W 1000-0000	Jen-Luc Rouge (FRA); L 0000-0001	did not advance						12

== Rowing ==
Men

Athlete	Event	Heats		Repechage		Semifinals		Final	
Athlete	Event	Time	Rank	Time	Rank	Time	Rank	Time	Rank
Gilberto Gerhardt; Sérgio Sztancsa	Double sculls	7:02.18	5 R	6:48.95	4	Did not advance			
Raúl Bagattini; Guilherme Campos	Coxless pair	8:00.64	5 R	NT	6	Did not advance			
Atalibio Magioni; Wandir Kuntze; Nilton Alonço	Coxed pairs	7:39.20	2 SF	BYE		7:21.81	5 FB	8:14.44	10

== Sailing ==
Open

Athlete	Event	Race														Final rank	
Athlete	Event	1		2		3		4		5		6		7		Final rank	
Athlete	Event	Score	Rank	Score	Rank	Score	Rank	Score	Rank	Score	Rank	Score	Rank	Score	Rank	Score	Rank
Claudio Biekarck	Finn	6	11.7	7	13.0	5	10.0	~~19~~	~~25.0~~	2	3.0	1	0.0	11	17.0	54.7	4
Marco A. Paradeda; Luiz A. Sohni Aydos	470	5	10.0	12	18.0	8	14.0	8	14.0	10	16.0	18	24.0	~~21~~	~~27.0~~	96.0	11
Reinaldo Conrad; Peter Ficker	Flying Dutchman	8	14.0	9	15.0	~~18~~	~~24.0~~	6	11.7	1	0.0	3	5.7	3	5.7	52.1	Bronze
Gastão D'Melo Brun; Vicente Brun; Andreas Wengert	Soling	~~17~~	~~23.0~~	9	15.0	6	11.7	16	22.0	4	8.0	13	19.0	3	5.7	81.4	10

== Shooting ==
Open

Athlete	Event	Final	
Athlete	Event	Score	Rank
Waldemar Capucci	50 m rifle prone	582	60
Durval Guimarães	50 m rifle prone	592	9
Paulo Lamego	50 m pistol	544	29
Romeu Luchiari Filho	Skeet	189	30
Delival Nobre	25 m rapid fire pistol	563	41
Marcos José Olsen	Trap	181	11
Athos Pisoni	Skeet	191	22
Bertino de Souza	50 m pistol	556	9

== Swimming ==
Men

Athlete	Event	Heat		Semifinal		Final	
Athlete	Event	Time	Rank	Time	Rank	Time	Rank
Rômulo Arantes	100 metre backstroke	58.46	2 Q	58.49	6	did not advance	
Rômulo Arantes	200 metre backstroke	2:07.38	4	did not advance			
Rômulo Arantes	100 metre butterfly	58.80	5	did not advance			
José Fiolo	100 metre breaststroke	1:06.18	4 Q	1:06.38	7	did not advance	
Paul Jouanneau	100 metre freestyle	54.49	5	did not advance			
Paul Jouanneau	100 metre backstroke	59.35	2 Q	59.59	7	did not advance	
Djan Madruga	400 metre freestyle	3:59.62	1 Q OR	BYE		3:57.18	4
Djan Madruga	1500 metre freestyle	15:36.95	2 Q	BYE		15:19.84	4
Sérgio Ribeiro	100 metre breaststroke	1:06.07	4 Q	1:06.69	8	did not advance	
Sérgio Ribeiro	200 metre breaststroke	DSQ		did not advance			

Women

Athlete	Event	Heat		Semifinal		Final	
Athlete	Event	Time	Rank	Time	Rank	Time	Rank
Maria Guimarães	400 metre freestyle	4:32.63	4	did not advance			
Maria Guimarães	800 metre freestyle	DSQ		did not advance			
Flavia Nadalutti	100 metre butterfly	1:06.29	5	did not advance			
Rosemary Ribeiro	100 metre butterfly	1:06.50	6	did not advance			
Rosemary Ribeiro	200 metre butterfly	2:23.79	6	did not advance			
Cristina Teixeira	100 metre breaststroke	1:17.94	6	did not advance			
Cristina Teixeira	200 metre breaststroke	2:47.69	31	did not advance			

== Volleyball ==
=== Preliminary round ===
Pool B

Pos	Team	Pld	W	L	Pts	SW	SL	SR	SPW	SPL	SPR	Qualification
1	Soviet Union	3	3	0	6	9	0	MAX	135	63	2.143	Semifinals
2	Japan	3	2	1	5	6	3	2.000	118	89	1.326	Semifinals
3	Brazil	3	1	2	4	3	8	0.375	118	142	0.831	5th–8th semifinals
4	Italy	3	0	3	3	2	9	0.222	81	158	0.513	5th–8th semifinals
WD	Egypt (Note: Egypt withdrew because of the Congolese-led boycott after they lost to Brazil 1–3 (5–15, 5–15, 15–13, 9–15) on 18 July. The result of that match was annulled.)	0	0	0	0	0	0	—	0	0	—	

Notes:

Date		Score		Set 1	Set 2	Set 3	Set 4	Set 5	Total
20 Jul	Soviet Union	3–0	Brazil	15–7	15–11	15–2			45–20
22 Jul	Japan	3–0	Brazil	15–13	15–8	15–9			45–30
24 Jul	Brazil	3–2	Italy	15–8	11–15	12–15	15–6	15–8	68–52

=== 5th–8th semifinals ===
Date		Score		Set 1	Set 2	Set 3	Set 4	Set 5	Total
26 Jul	South Korea	3–2	Brazil	15–12	12–15	7–15	15–6	15–5	64–53

=== 7th place match ===
Date		Score		Set 1	Set 2	Set 3	Set 4	Set 5	Total
27 Jul	Italy	0–3	Brazil	8–15	6–15	8–15			22–45

=== Team roster ===
- Bebeto de Freitas
- Sergio Danilas
- Alexandre Abeid
- Eloi Lacerda
- Antonio Carlos Moreno
- Bernard Rajzman
- William Carvalho da Silva
- Celso Kalache
- Jean Luc Rosat
- Fernando Roscio
- Paulo Peterle
- José Roberto Guimarães

Head coaches: Paulo Sevciuc and Carlos Souto

== Weightlifting ==
Men

Athlete	Event	Snatch		Clean & Jerk		Total	Rank
Athlete	Event	Result	Rank	Result	Rank	Total	Rank
Paulo de Sene	56 kg	92.5	17	122.5	15	215.0	16
