= Brazil at the 1975 Pan American Games =

- IOC code: BRA
- NOC: Brazilian Olympic Committee
- Website: www.cob.org.br

in Mexico City 12–26 October 1975
- Competitors: 216 in 16 sports
- Flag bearer: Antônio Carlos Moreno
- Medals Ranked 5th: Gold 8 Silver 13 Bronze 23 Total 44

Pan American Games appearances (overview)
- 1951; 1955; 1959; 1963; 1967; 1971; 1975; 1979; 1983; 1987; 1991; 1995; 1999; 2003; 2007; 2011; 2015; 2019; 2023; 2027

Brazil competed at the 7th Pan American Games held in Mexico City, Mexico from October 12 to October 26, 1975.

== Medals ==
| Medal | Name(s) | Sport | Event | Date | Ref |
|---|---|---|---|---|---|
| Bronze | Silvina Pereira | Athletics | Women's 200m | 15 October 1975 | |
| Bronze | Delmo da Silva | Athletics | Men's 400m | 18 October 1975 | |
| Silver | José Romão da Silva | Athletics | Men's 3000m steeplechase | 14 October 1975 | |
| Gold | João Carlos de Oliveira | Athletics | Men's long jump | 13 October 1975 | |
| Gold | João Carlos de Oliveira | Athletics | Men's triple jump | 15 October 1975 | |
| Bronze | Men's basketball team: Adilson Nascimento Fausto Gianecchini Gilson Trindade de Jesus José Geraldo Hélio Rubens Marcel de Souza Marcos Leite Milton Setrini Paulo César Esteves Roberto José Corrêa Sérgio Toledo Machado Ubiratan Pereira Maciel | Basketball | Men's tournament | | |
| Silver | Fernando José Martins | Boxing | Men's middleweight (-75 kg) | | |
| Bronze | João Batista Rodrigues | Boxing | Men's light heavyweight (-81 kg) | | |
| Bronze | Jair de Campos | Boxing | Men's heavyweight (+81 kg) | | |
| Bronze | Diana Paes Leme; Gerson Borges; Ingrid Trokyo | Equestrian | Dressage team | | |
| Bronze | Arthur Cramer; Francisco Buonafina; Frederico Alencar; Ronaldo Schwantes | Fencing | Men's épée team | | |
| Gold | Men's football team: Alberto Leguelé Bianque Carlos Carlinhos Cláudio Adão Eudes Edinho Erivelto Chico Fraga Cassano Batista Santos Luiz Alberto Marcelo Oliveira Mauro Cabeção Pitta Tiquinho Rosemiro Tecão Zé Carlos | Football | Men's tournament | 25 October 1975 | |
| Bronze | Luis Shinohara | Judo | Men's half lightweight (-63 kg) | | |
| Silver | Roberto Machusso | Judo | Men's lightweight (-70 kg) | | |
| Silver | Carlos Motta | Judo | Men's middleweight (-80 kg) | | |
| Gold | Ricardo Campos | Judo | Men's half heavyweight (-93 kg) | | |
| Bronze | Fenelon da Silva | Judo | Men's heavyweight (+93 kg) | | |
| Gold | Gilberto Gerhardt; Mario Castro Filho | Rowing | Men's double sculls | | |
| Bronze | Antonio Augusto Pistoia; Edilson Cunha Bezerra; Francisco Penedo Tambasco | Rowing | Men's coxed pair-oared shells | | |
| Gold | Érico de Souza; Raul Bagattini | Rowing | Men's coxless pair-oared shells | | |
| Silver | Cláudio Biekarck | Sailing | Finn class | | |
| Gold | Burkhard Cordes; Reinaldo Conrad | Sailing | Flying Dutchman | | |
| Silver | Gregório Pontes; Luiz André Reis | Sailing | Snipe class | | |
| Silver | Durval Guimarães | Shooting | Men's 50m rifle prone | | |
| Bronze | Durval Guimarães; Edmar de Salles; Milton Sobocinski; Waldemar Capucci | Shooting | Men's 50m rifle prone team | | |
| Gold | Athos Pisoni | Shooting | Men's skeet | | |
| Silver | Athos Pisoni; José Pedro Costa; Romeu Luchiari Filho; Sérgio Cunha Bastos | Shooting | Men's skeet team | | |
| Bronze | Athos Pisoni; Francisco Alavaugarte; Marcos José Olsen; Mario Morganti | Shooting | Men's trap team | | |
| Bronze | Djan Madruga | Swimming | Men's 400m freestyle | 21 October 1975 | |
| Bronze | Djan Madruga | Swimming | Men's 1500m freestyle | 23 October 1975 | |
| Bronze | Rômulo Arantes | Swimming | Men's 100m backstroke | 19 October 1975 | |
| Bronze | José Sylvio Fiolo | Swimming | Men's 100m breaststroke | 19 October 1975 | |
| Bronze | Djan Madruga; José Namorado; Paul Jouanneau; Rômulo Arantes | Swimming | Men's 4 × 200 m freestyle relay | 22 October 1975 | |
| Bronze | Akcel de Godoy; José Namorado; José Sylvio Fiolo; Rômulo Arantes | Swimming | Men's 4 × 100 m medley relay | 24 October 1975 | |
| Bronze | Rosemary Ribeiro | Swimming | Women's 200m butterfly | 23 October 1975 | |
| Bronze | Christiane Paquelet; Lucy Burle; Maria Guimarães; Rosemary Ribeiro | Swimming | Women's 4 × 100 m freestyle relay | 22 October 1975 | |
| Bronze | Christiane Paquelet; Cristina Teixeira; Flávia Nadalutti; Lucy Burle | Swimming | Women's 4 × 100 m medley relay | 19 October 1975 | |
| Bronze | José Schmidt Filho; João Soares Jr. | Tennis | Men's doubles | | |
| Silver | Patricia Medrado | Tennis | Women's singles | | |
| Silver | Maria Christina Andrade; Wanda Ferraz | Tennis | Women's doubles | | |
| Silver | Men's volleyball team: Alexandre Kalache Antônio Carlos Moreno Bernard Rajzman Elói de Oliveira Fernando Ávila Jean Luc Rosat José Marcelino Mauro Henrique Fialho Bebeto de Freitas Paulo Peterle Sérgio Danilas William Silva | Volleyball | Men's tournament | | |
| Silver | Paulo de Sene | Weightlifting | Men's bantamweight (-56 kg) – snatch | | |
| Silver | Paulo de Sene | Weightlifting | Men's bantamweight (-56 kg) – total | | |
| Bronze | Eduardo Soares de Souza | Weightlifting | Men's heavyweight (-110 kg) – snatch | | |

Medals by sport
| Sport | 1st place, gold medalist(s) | 2nd place, silver medalist(s) | 3rd place, bronze medalist(s) | Total |
| Athletics | 2 | 1 | 2 | 5 |
| Rowing | 2 | 0 | 1 | 3 |
| Shooting | 1 | 2 | 2 | 5 |
| Judo | 1 | 2 | 2 | 5 |
| Sailing | 1 | 2 | 0 | 3 |
| Football | 1 | 0 | 0 | 1 |
| Weightlifting | 0 | 2 | 1 | 3 |
| Tennis | 0 | 2 | 1 | 3 |
| Boxing | 0 | 1 | 2 | 3 |
| Volleyball | 0 | 1 | 0 | 1 |
| Swimming | 0 | 0 | 9 | 9 |
| Basketball | 0 | 0 | 1 | 1 |
| Fencing | 0 | 0 | 1 | 1 |
| Equestrian | 0 | 0 | 1 | 1 |
| Total | 8 | 13 | 23 | 44 |

== See also ==
- Brazil at the 1976 Summer Olympics
