= Swimming at the 1976 Summer Olympics – Men's 100 metre backstroke =

Men's 100 metre backstroke at the Games of the XXI Olympiad
- Venue: Olympic Pool, Montreal
- Date: 18 July 1976 (heats & semifinals); 19 July 1976 (final)
- Competitors: 41 from 28 nations
- Winning time: 55.49 WR

Medalists
1st place, gold medalist(s)		John Naber	United States
2nd place, silver medalist(s)		Peter Rocca	United States
3rd place, bronze medalist(s)		Roland Matthes	East Germany

The men's 100 metre backstroke event for the 1976 Summer Olympics was held in Montreal, Canada. The event took place on 18 and 19 July.

== Heats ==
The fastest 16 advanced to the semi-finals.

Heat 1

Rank	Athlete	Country	Time	Notes
1	Lutz Wanja	East Germany	58.38	Q
2	Mark Tonelli	Australia	58.53	Q
3	Miloslav Roľko	Czechoslovakia	1:00.41	
4	Steve Hardy	Canada	1:00.69	
5	Tadashi Honda	Japan	1:01.00	
6	Ivan Mikolutsky	Soviet Union	1:03.86	
7	Frank Richardson	Nicaragua	1:12.38	

Heat 2

Rank	Athlete	Country	Time	Notes
1	Carlos Berrocal	Puerto Rico	58.71	Q
2	Paul Jouanneau	Brazil	59.35	Q
3	Steve Pickell	Canada	59.65	Q
4	José Urueta	Mexico	1:00.85	
5	Mikael Brandén	Sweden	1:01.05	
6	Chiang Jin Choon	Malaysia	1:05.86	

Heat 3

Rank	Athlete	Country	Time	Notes
1	Bob Jackson	United States	58.02	Q
2	Rômulo Arantes Filho	Brazil	58.46	Q
3	Jim Carter	Great Britain	1:00.39	
4	Gary Abraham	Great Britain	1:00.61	
5	Robert Howard	Ireland	1:00.77	
6	Mike Scarth	Canada	1:01.33	
7	António de Melo	Portugal	1:05.76	

Heat 4

Rank	Athlete	Country	Time	Notes
1	Roland Matthes	East Germany	57.98	Q
2	Glenn Patching	Australia	59.49	Q
3	Ryszard Żugaj	Poland	1:00.16	Q
4	Róbert Rudolf	Hungary	1:00.58	
5	Nenad Miloš	Yugoslavia	1:00.70	
6	Ramón Volcan	Venezuela	1:01.20	
7	Lionel Beylot-Bourcelot	France	1:01.58	

Heat 5

Rank	Athlete	Country	Time	Notes
1	Mark Kerry	Australia	57.99	Q
2	Peter Rocca	United States	58.12	Q
3	Igor Omelchenko	Soviet Union	59.03	Q
4	Reinhold Becker	West Germany	1:00.57	
5	Predrag Miloš	Yugoslavia	1:01.05	
6	Conrado Porta	Argentina	1:01.13	
7	Gerardo Rosario	Philippines	1:02.08	

Heat 6

Rank	Athlete	Country	Time	Notes
1	John Naber	United States	56.80	Q
2	Zoltán Verrasztó	Hungary	59.30	Q
3	Santiago Esteva	Spain	59.88	Q
4	Krasimir Stoykov	Bulgaria	1:00.24	
5	Ignacio Álvarez	Mexico	1:00.80	
6	Enrico Bisso	Italy	1:01.32	
7	Thomas Hofer	Switzerland	1:01.90	

== Semifinals ==
The fastest 8 advanced to the finals.

Heat 1

Rank	Athlete	Country	Time	Notes
1	Roland Matthes	East Germany	57.48	Q
2	Lutz Wanja	East Germany	57.50	Q
3	Bob Jackson	United States	57.65	Q
4	Mark Tonelli	Australia	58.14	Q
5	Steve Pickell	Canada	58.21	
6	Igor Omelchenk'o	Soviet Union	58.77	
7	Paul Jouanneau	Brazil	59.59	
8	Ryszard Żugaj	Poland	59.90	

Heat 2

Rank	Athlete	Country	Time	Notes
1	John Naber	United States	56.19	Q, WR
2	Peter Rocca	United States	56.88	Q
3	Carlos Berrocal	Puerto Rico	57.53	Q
4	Mark Kerry	Australia	58.04	Q
5	Glenn Patching	Australia	58.15	
6	Rômulo Arantes Filho	Brazil	58.49	
7	Zoltán Verrasztó	Hungary	58.63	
8	Santiago Esteva	Spain	59.71	

== Final ==
Rank	Athlete	Country	Time	Notes
1	John Naber	United States	55.49	WR
2	Peter Rocca	United States	56.34	
3	Roland Matthes	East Germany	57.22	
4	Carlos Berrocal	Puerto Rico	57.28	
5	Lutz Wanja	East Germany	57.49	
6	Bob Jackson	United States	57.69	
7	Mark Kerry	Australia	57.94	
8	Mark Tonelli	Australia	58.42	
