= Swimming at the 1979 Pan American Games – Men's 200 metre backstroke =

Men's 200 metre backstroke at the 1979 Pan American Games
- Venue: Piscina Olimpica Del Escambron
- Dates: July 5 (preliminaries and finals)
- Competitors: from - nations

Medalists
Gold medal	Peter Rocca	United States
Silver medal	Jesse Vassallo	United States
Bronze medal	Djan Madruga	Brazil

The men's 200 metre backstroke competition of the swimming events at the 1979 Pan American Games took place on 5 July at the Piscina Olimpica Del Escambron. The last Pan American Games champion was Dan Harrigan of US.

This race consisted of four lengths of the pool, all in backstroke.

== Results ==
All times are in minutes and seconds.

KEY:	q	Fastest non-qualifiers	Q	Qualified	GR	Games record	NR	National record	PB	Personal best	SB	Seasonal best

=== Heats ===
The first round was held on July 5.

Rank	Name	Nationality	Time	Notes
1	Jesse Vassallo	United States	2:05.93	Q
2	Peter Rocca	United States	2:06.52	Q
3	Conrado Porta	Argentina	2:06.85	Q
4	Rob Wallenius	Canada	2:08.39	Q
5	Wade Flemons	Canada	2:08.97	Q
6	Djan Madruga	Brazil	2:09.48	Q
7	Rômulo Arantes	Brazil	2:10.15	Q
8	José Urueta	Mexico	2:10.83	Q
9	Jorge Varela	Mexico	2:10.84	
10	Victor Vasallo	Puerto Rico	2:11.98	
11	Carlos Berrocal	Puerto Rico	2:13.19	
12	Jose Luis Yepes	Ecuador	2:13.25	NR
13	Alvaro Roda	Uruguay	2:13.50	
14	Erik Rosskopf	U.S. Virgin Islands	2:21.69	
15	Donaldo Clough	Dominican Republic	2:24.56	NR

=== Final ===
The final was held on July 5.

Rank	Name	Nationality	Time	Notes
1st place, gold medalist(s)	Peter Rocca	United States	2:00.98	NR, GR
2nd place, silver medalist(s)	Jesse Vassallo	United States	2:02.07	
3rd place, bronze medalist(s)	Djan Madruga	Brazil	2:04.74	NR
4	Rômulo Arantes	Brazil	2:04.99	
5	Conrado Porta	Argentina	2:05.33	
6	Wade Flemons	Canada	2:07.90	
7	Rob Wallenius	Canada	2:08.40	
8	José Urueta	Mexico	2:10.25	
