= Swimming at the 1979 Pan American Games – Men's 4 × 100 metre medley relay =

Men's 4 × 100 metre medley relay at the 1979 Pan American Games
- Venue: Piscina Olimpica Del Escambron
- Dates: July 8 (preliminaries and finals)
- Competitors: from - nations

Medalists
Gold medal	Bob Jackson, Steve Lundquist, Bob Placak and David McCagg	United States
Silver medal	Steve Pickell, Graham Smith, Dan Thompson and Bill Sawchuk	Canada
Bronze medal	Carlos Berrocal, Orlando Catinchi, Arnaldo Pérez and Fernando Cañales	Puerto Rico

The men's 4 × 100 metre medley relay competition of the swimming events at the 1979 Pan American Games took place on 8 July at the Piscina Olimpica Del Escambron. The last Pan American Games champion was the United States.

== Results ==
All times are in minutes and seconds.

KEY:	q	Fastest non-qualifiers	Q	Qualified	GR	Games record	NR	National record	PB	Personal best	SB	Seasonal best

=== Heats ===
The first round was held on July 8.

Rank	Name	Nationality	Time	Notes
1	- - - -	Canada	3:58.03	Q
2	- - - -	United States	3:59.80	Q
3	- - - -	Puerto Rico	4:00.64	Q
4	- - - -	Mexico	4:01.26	Q
5	- - - -	Brazil	4:03.82	Q
6	- - - -	Argentina	4:15.02	Q
7	- - - -	U.S. Virgin Islands	4:15.41	Q
8	- - - -	Ecuador	4:19.05	Q
9	- - - -	Venezuela	4:23.77	
10	- - - -	Dominican Republic	DQ	

=== Final ===
The final was held on July 8.

Rank	Name	Nationality	Time	Notes
1st place, gold medalist(s)	Bob Jackson (57.21); Steve Lundquist (1:03.76); Bob Placak (54.47); David McCagg (51.76)	United States	3:47.20	NR, GR
2nd place, silver medalist(s)	Steve Pickell (57.48); Graham Smith (1:05.23); Dan Thompson (55.48); Bill Sawchuk (51.83)	Canada	3:50.02	
3rd place, bronze medalist(s)	Carlos Berrocal (57.82); Orlando Catinchi (1:07.36); Arnaldo Pérez (57.90); Fernando Cañales (51.45)	Puerto Rico	3:54.53	NR
4	Rômulo Arantes (57.87); Luiz Carvalho (1:07.28); Caio Filardi (57.39); Cyro Delgado (52.37)	Brazil	3:54.91	SA
5	José Urueta (1:00.78); Miguel Santiesteban (1:06.66); Leonardo Gamez (57.66); Richard Sasser (54.07)	Mexico	3:59.17	NR
6	Conrado Porta (1:00.51); Daniel Garimaldi (1:11.42); Claudio Lutotovich (1:00.86); Alejandro Blanco (55.02)	Argentina	4:07.81	
7	- - - -	U.S. Virgin Islands	4:15.04	NR
8	- - - -	Ecuador	4:17.29	
