= Swimming at the 1979 Pan American Games – Men's 100 metre backstroke =

Men's 100 metre backstroke at the 1979 Pan American Games
- Venue: Piscina Olimpica Del Escambron
- Dates: July 2 (preliminaries and finals)
- Competitors: from - nations

Medalists
Gold medal	Bob Jackson	United States
Silver medal	Rômulo Arantes	Brazil
Bronze medal	Steve Pickell	Canada

The men's 100 metre backstroke competition of the swimming events at the 1979 Pan American Games took place on 2 July at the Piscina Olimpica Del Escambron. The last Pan American Games champion was Peter Rocca of US.

This race consisted of two lengths of the pool, all in backstroke.

== Results ==
All times are in minutes and seconds.

KEY:	q	Fastest non-qualifiers	Q	Qualified	GR	Games record	NR	National record	PB	Personal best	SB	Seasonal best

=== Heats ===
The first round was held on July 2.

Rank	Name	Nationality	Time	Notes
1	Rômulo Arantes	Brazil	57.69	Q
2	Carlos Berrocal	Puerto Rico	58.05	Q
3	Bob Jackson	United States	58.32	Q
4	Steve Pickell	Canada	58.72	Q
5	Conrado Porta	Argentina	59.50	Q
6	Wade Flemons	Canada	59.52	Q
7	Clay Britt	United States	1:00.24	Q
8	José Urueta	Mexico	1:00.39	Q
9	Sílvio Monteiro	Brazil	1:00.52	
10	Victor Vasallo	Puerto Rico	1:01.74	
11	Jose Luis Yepes	Ecuador	1:01.84	
12	Jorge Varela	Mexico	1:02.42	
13	David Lindquist	U.S. Virgin Islands	1:03.53	NR
14	Alvaro Roda	Uruguay	1:03.82	
15	Erik Rosskopf	U.S. Virgin Islands	1:05.77	
16	Donaldo Clough	Dominican Republic	1:07.11	
17	Miguel Oqueli	El Salvador	1:10.40	

=== Final ===
The final was held on July 2.

Rank	Name	Nationality	Time	Notes
1st place, gold medalist(s)	Bob Jackson	United States	56.66	NR, GR
2nd place, silver medalist(s)	Rômulo Arantes	Brazil	57.20	SA
3rd place, bronze medalist(s)	Steve Pickell	Canada	57.89	
4	Clay Britt	United States	57.98	
5	Carlos Berrocal	Puerto Rico	57.99	
6	Wade Flemons	Canada	59.52	
7	Conrado Porta	Argentina	59.86	
8	José Urueta	Mexico	1:00.37	
