= Swimming at the 1975 Pan American Games – Women's 4 × 100 metre medley relay =

Women's 4 × 100 metre medley relay at the 1975 Pan American Games
- Venue: -
- Dates: October 19 (preliminaries and finals)
- Competitors: from - nations

Medalists
Gold medal	Rosemary Bonne, Marcia Morey, Camille Wright and Kim Peyton	United States
Silver medal	-	Canada
Bronze medal	Christiane Paquelet, Cristina Teixeira, Flávia Nadalutti and Lucy Burle	Brazil

The women's 4 × 100 metre medley relay competition of the swimming events at the 1975 Pan American Games took place on 19 October. The defending Pan American Games champion is the Canada.

== Results ==
All times are in minutes and seconds.

KEY:	q	Fastest non-qualifiers	Q	Qualified	GR	Games record	NR	National record	PB	Personal best	SB	Seasonal best

=== Final ===
The final was held on October 19.

Rank	Name	Nationality	Time	Notes
1st place, gold medalist(s)	Rosemary Bonne; Marcia Morey; Camille Wright; Kim Peyton	United States	4:22.34	
2nd place, silver medalist(s)	- - - -	Canada	4:24.84	
3rd place, bronze medalist(s)	Christiane Paquelet; Cristina Teixeira; Flávia Nadalutti; Lucy Burle	Brazil	4:37.67	
4	- - - -	-	-	
5	- - - -	-	-	
6	- - - -	-	-	
7	- - - -	-	-	
8	- - - -	-	-	
