= Swimming at the 1975 Pan American Games – Men's 100 metre breaststroke =

Men's 100 metre breaststroke at the 1975 Pan American Games
- Venue: -
- Dates: October 19 (preliminaries and finals)
- Competitors: from - nations

Medalists
Gold medal	Rick Colella	United States
Silver medal	Lawrence Dowler	United States
Bronze medal	José Fiolo	Brazil

The men's 100 metre breaststroke competition of the swimming events at the 1975 Pan American Games took place on 19 October. The last Pan American Games champion was Mark Chatfield of US.

This race consisted of two lengths of the pool, both lengths being in breaststroke.

== Results ==
All times are in minutes and seconds.

KEY:	q	Fastest non-qualifiers	Q	Qualified	GR	Games record	NR	National record	PB	Personal best	SB	Seasonal best

=== Final ===
The final was held on October 19.

Rank	Name	Nationality	Time	Notes
1st place, gold medalist(s)	Rick Colella	United States	1:06.28	
2nd place, silver medalist(s)	Lawrence Dowler	United States	1:06.61	
3rd place, bronze medalist(s)	José Fiolo	Brazil	1:08.12	
4	Sérgio Pinto Ribeiro	Brazil	1:08.17	
5	-	-	-	
6	-	-	-	
7	-	-	-	
8	-	-	-	
