= Swimming at the 1975 Pan American Games – Men's 4 × 200 metre freestyle relay =

Men's 4 × 200 metre freestyle relay at the 1975 Pan American Games
- Venue: -
- Dates: October 22 (preliminaries and finals)
- Competitors: from - nations

Medalists
Gold medal	Rick DeMont, Rex Favero, Brad Horner and Michael Curington	United States
Silver medal	-	Canada
Bronze medal	Djan Madruga, José Namorado, Paul Jouanneau and Rômulo Arantes	Brazil

The men's 4 × 200 metre freestyle relay competition of the swimming events at the 1975 Pan American Games took place on 22 October. The defending Pan American Games champion is the United States.

This race consisted of sixteen lengths of the pool. Each of the four swimmers completed four lengths of the pool. The first swimmer had to touch the wall before the second could leave the starting block.

== Results ==
All times are in minutes and seconds.

KEY:	q	Fastest non-qualifiers	Q	Qualified	GR	Games record	NR	National record	PB	Personal best	SB	Seasonal best

=== Final ===
The final was held on October 22.

Rank	Name	Nationality	Time	Notes
1st place, gold medalist(s)	Rick DeMont; Rex Favero; Brad Horner; Michael Curington	United States	7:50.96	
2nd place, silver medalist(s)	- - - -	Canada	8:00.91	
3rd place, bronze medalist(s)	Djan Madruga; José Namorado; Paul Jouanneau; Rômulo Arantes	Brazil	8:02.36	
4	- - - -	-	-	
5	- - - -	-	-	
6	- - - -	-	-	
7	- - - -	-	-	
8	- - - -	-	-	
