= Swimming at the 1975 Pan American Games – Men's 4 × 100 metre medley relay =

Men's 4 × 100 metre medley relay at the 1975 Pan American Games
- Venue: -
- Dates: October 24 (preliminaries and finals)
- Competitors: from - nations

Medalists
Gold medal	Peter Rocca, Rick Colella, Michael Curington and Jack Babashoff	United States
Silver medal	-	Canada
Bronze medal	Axel de Godoy, José Namorado, Rômulo Arantes and José Fiolo	Brazil

The men's 4 × 100 metre medley relay competition of the swimming events at the 1975 Pan American Games took place on 24 October. The defending Pan American Games champion is the United States.

== Results ==
All times are in minutes and seconds.

KEY:	q	Fastest non-qualifiers	Q	Qualified	GR	Games record	NR	National record	PB	Personal best	SB	Seasonal best

=== Final ===
The final was held on October 24.

Rank	Name	Nationality	Time	Notes
1st place, gold medalist(s)	Peter Rocca; Rick Colella; Michael Curington; Jack Babashoff	United States	3:53.81	
2nd place, silver medalist(s)	- - - -	Canada	3:58.95	
3rd place, bronze medalist(s)	Axel de Godoy; José Namorado; Rômulo Arantes; José Fiolo	Brazil	3:59.05	
4	- - - -	-	-	
5	- - - -	-	-	
6	- - - -	-	-	
7	- - - -	-	-	
8	- - - -	-	-	
