= Swimming at the 1975 Pan American Games – Women's 4 × 100 metre freestyle relay =

Women's 4 × 100 metre freestyle relay at the 1975 Pan American Games
- Venue: -
- Dates: October 23 (preliminaries and finals)
- Competitors: from - nations

Medalists
Gold medal	Kathy Heddy, Bonnee Brown, Jill Sterkel and Kim Peyton	United States
Silver medal	-	Canada
Bronze medal	Christiane Paquelet, Lucy Burle, Maria Guimarães and Rosemary Ribeiro	Brazil

The women's 4 × 100 metre freestyle relay competition of the swimming events at the 1975 Pan American Games took place on 23 October. The defending Pan American Games champion is the United States.

This race consisted of eight lengths of the pool. Each of the four swimmers completed two lengths of the pool. The first swimmer had to touch the wall before the second could leave the starting block.

== Results ==
All times are in minutes and seconds.

KEY:	q	Fastest non-qualifiers	Q	Qualified	GR	Games record	NR	National record	PB	Personal best	SB	Seasonal best

=== Final ===
The final was held on October 23.

Rank	Name	Nationality	Time	Notes
1st place, gold medalist(s)	Kathy Heddy; Bonnee Brown; Jill Sterkel; Kim Peyton	United States	3:53.31	
2nd place, silver medalist(s)	- - - -	Canada	3:54.95	
3rd place, bronze medalist(s)	Christiane Paquelet; Lucy Burle; Maria Guimarães; Rosemary Ribeiro	Brazil	4:12.20	
4	- - - -	-	-	
5	- - - -	-	-	
6	- - - -	-	-	
7	- - - -	-	-	
8	- - - -	-	-	
