= Swimming at the 1975 Pan American Games – Women's 100 metre freestyle =

Women's 100 metre freestyle at the 1975 Pan American Games
- Venue: -
- Dates: October 24 (preliminaries and finals)
- Competitors: from - nations

Medalists
| Gold medal | Kim Peyton | United States |
| Silver medal | Jill Sterkel | United States |
| Bronze medal | Jill Quirk | Canada |

The women's 100 metre freestyle competition of the swimming events at the 1975 Pan American Games took place on 24 October. The last Pan American Games champion was Sandy Neilson of US.

This race consisted of two lengths of the pool, both lengths being in freestyle.

== Results ==
All times are in minutes and seconds.

| KEY: | q | Fastest non-qualifiers | Q | Qualified | GR | Games record | NR | National record | PB | Personal best | SB | Seasonal best |

=== Final ===
The final was held on October 24.

| Rank | Name | Nationality | Time | Notes |
|---|---|---|---|---|
| 1st place, gold medalist(s) | Kim Peyton | United States | 58.24 | |
| 2nd place, silver medalist(s) | Jill Sterkel | United States | 58.57 | |
| 3rd place, bronze medalist(s) | Jill Quirk | Canada | 58.92 | |
| 4 | - | - | - | |
| 5 | - | - | - | |
| 6 | Rosemary Ribeiro | Brazil | 1:01.85 | |
| 7 | Lucy Burle | Brazil | 1:02.46 | |
| 8 | - | - | - | |
