= Swimming at the 1975 Pan American Games – Men's 200 metre backstroke =

Men's 200 metre backstroke at the 1975 Pan American Games
- Venue: -
- Dates: October 21 (preliminaries and finals)
- Competitors: from - nations

Medalists
Gold medal	Dan Harrigan	United States
Silver medal	Mike Scarth	Canada
Bronze medal	Bob Jackson	United States

The men's 200 metre backstroke competition of the swimming events at the 1975 Pan American Games took place on 21 October. The last Pan American Games champion was Charlie Campbell of the United States.

This race consisted of four lengths of the pool, all in backstroke.

== Results ==
All times are in minutes and seconds.

KEY:	q	Fastest non-qualifiers	Q	Qualified	GR	Games record	NR	National record	PB	Personal best	SB	Seasonal best

=== Final ===
The final was held on October 21.

Rank	Name	Nationality	Time	Notes
1st place, gold medalist(s)	Dan Harrigan	United States	2:06.69	
2nd place, silver medalist(s)	Mike Scarth	Canada	2:09.20	
3rd place, bronze medalist(s)	Bob Jackson	United States	2:10.18	
4	Rômulo Arantes	Brazil	2:11.78	
5	-	-	-	
6	-	-	-	
7	-	-	-	
8	-	-	-	
