= Swimming at the 1979 Pan American Games – Men's 100 metre butterfly =

Men's 100 metre butterfly at the 1979 Pan American Games
- Venue: Piscina Olimpica Del Escambron
- Dates: July 7 (preliminaries and finals)
- Competitors: from - nations

Medalists
Gold medal	Robert Placak	United States
Silver medal	Dan Thompson	Canada
Bronze medal	Clay Evans	Canada

The men's 100 metre butterfly competition of the swimming events at the 1979 Pan American Games took place on 7 July at the Piscina Olimpica Del Escambron. The last Pan American Games champion was Mike Curington of US.

This race consisted of two lengths of the pool, all in butterfly.

== Results ==
All times are in minutes and seconds.

KEY:	q	Fastest non-qualifiers	Q	Qualified	GR	Games record	NR	National record	PB	Personal best	SB	Seasonal best

=== Heats ===
The first round was held on July 7.

Rank	Name	Nationality	Time	Notes
1	Robert Placak	United States	55.88	Q
2	Dan Thompson	Canada	55.94	Q
3	Clay Evans	Canada	56.34	Q
4	Jorge Jaramillo	Colombia	57.51	Q
5	David McCagg	United States	57.93	Q
6	Caio Filardi	Brazil	58.12	Q
7	Arnaldo Pérez	Puerto Rico	58.34	Q
8	Leonardo Gamez	Mexico	58.57	Q
9	Filiberto Colon	Puerto Rico	59.12	
10	Daniel Garimaldi	Argentina	59.17	NR
11	Rafael Vidal	Venezuela	59.23	NR
12	Claudio Lutotovich	Argentina	1:00.12	
13	David Lindquist	U.S. Virgin Islands	1:00.22	NR
14	Roberto Ledesma	Ecuador	1:00.66	
15	Miguel Oqueli	El Salvador	1:02.40	
16	Ruben Martinez	El Salvador	1:03.71	
17	Jordy Masalles	Dominican Republic	1:03.79	
18	Bobby Peterson	U.S. Virgin Islands	1:04.06	
19	Donaldo Clough	Dominican Republic	1:04.36	

=== Final ===
The final was held on July 7.

Rank	Name	Nationality	Time	Notes
1st place, gold medalist(s)	Robert Placak	United States	55.54	NR, GR
2nd place, silver medalist(s)	Dan Thompson	Canada	55.56	
3rd place, bronze medalist(s)	Clay Evans	Canada	56.63	
4	David McCagg	United States	56.90	
5	Jorge Jaramillo	Colombia	57.79	
6	Caio Filardi	Brazil	57.85	
7	Leonardo Gamez	Mexico	58.25	NR
8	Arnaldo Pérez	Puerto Rico	58.42	
