= Swimming at the 1975 Pan American Games – Men's 100 metre freestyle =

Men's 100 metre freestyle at the 1975 Pan American Games
- Venue: -
- Dates: October 24 (preliminaries and finals)
- Competitors: from - nations

Medalists
Gold medal	Richard Abbott	United States
Silver medal	Jack Babashoff	United States
Bronze medal	Bruce Robertson	Canada

The men's 100 metre freestyle competition of the swimming events at the 1975 Pan American Games took place on 24 October. The last Pan American Games champion was Frank Heckl of US.

This race consisted of two lengths of the pool, both lengths being in freestyle.

== Results ==
All times are in minutes and seconds.

KEY:	q	Fastest non-qualifiers	Q	Qualified	GR	Games record	NR	National record	PB	Personal best	SB	Seasonal best

=== Final ===
The final was held on October 24.

Rank	Name	Nationality	Time	Notes
1st place, gold medalist(s)	Richard Abbott	United States	51.96	
2nd place, silver medalist(s)	Jack Babashoff	United States	52.26	
3rd place, bronze medalist(s)	Bruce Robertson	Canada	53.44	
4	-	-	-	
5	-	-	-	
6	Paulo Zanetti	Brazil	55.30	
7	-	-	-	
8	José Namorado	Brazil	55.65	
