= Swimming at the 1975 Pan American Games – Men's 400 metre freestyle =

Men's 400 metre freestyle at the 1975 Pan American Games
- Venue: -
- Dates: October 21 (preliminaries and finals)
- Competitors: from - nations

Medalists
Gold medal	Douglas Northway	United States
Silver medal	Bobby Hackett	United States
Bronze medal	Djan Madruga	Brazil

The men's 400 metre freestyle competition of the swimming events at the 1975 Pan American Games took place on 21 October. The last Pan American Games champion was Jim McConica of the United States.

This race consisted of eight lengths of the pool, with all eight being in the freestyle stroke.

== Results ==
All times are in minutes and seconds.

KEY:	q	Fastest non-qualifiers	Q	Qualified	GR	Games record	NR	National record	PB	Personal best	SB	Seasonal best

=== Final ===
The final was held on October 21.

Rank	Name	Nationality	Time	Notes
1st place, gold medalist(s)	Douglas Northway	United States	4:00.51	
2nd place, silver medalist(s)	Bobby Hackett	United States	4:03.38	
3rd place, bronze medalist(s)	Djan Madruga	Brazil	4:06.83	
4	-	-	-	
5	-	-	-	
6	-	-	-	
7	Paul Jouanneau	Brazil	4:22.19	
8	-	-	-	
