= Swimming at the 1983 Pan American Games – Men's 100 metre backstroke =

Men's 100 metre backstroke at the 1983 Pan American Games
- Venue: -
- Dates: August 21 (preliminaries and finals)
- Competitors: from - nations

Medalists
Gold medal	Rick Carey	United States
Silver medal	Dave Bottom	United States
Bronze medal	Mike West	Canada

The men's 100 metre backstroke competition of the swimming events at the 1983 Pan American Games took place on 21 August. The last Pan American Games champion was Bob Jackson of the United States.

This race consisted of two lengths of the pool, all in backstroke.

== Results ==
All times are in minutes and seconds.

KEY:	q	Fastest non-qualifiers	Q	Qualified	GR	Games record	NR	National record	PB	Personal best	SB	Seasonal best

=== Final ===
The final was held on August 21.

Rank	Name	Nationality	Time	Notes
1st place, gold medalist(s)	Rick Carey	United States	55.19	WR
2nd place, silver medalist(s)	Dave Bottom	United States	56.90	
3rd place, bronze medalist(s)	Mike West	Canada	57.20	
4	Wade Flemons	Canada	57.69	
5	Giovanni Frigo	Venezuela	59.12	NR
6	Carlos Henao	Colombia	59.64	NR
7	Allan Marsh	Jamaica	1:00.25	NR
8	Gustavo Bustamante	Venezuela	1:02.28	
