= Swimming at the 1975 Pan American Games – Women's 200 metre freestyle =

Women's 200 metre freestyle at the 1975 Pan American Games
- Venue: -
- Dates: October 20 (preliminaries and finals)
- Competitors: from - nations

Medalists
Gold medal	Kim Peyton	United States
Silver medal	Gail Amundrud	Canada
Bronze medal	Anne Jardin	Canada

The women's 200 metre freestyle competition of the swimming events at the 1975 Pan American Games took place on 20 October. The last Pan American Games champion was Kim Peyton of US.

This race consisted of four lengths of the pool, all in freestyle.

== Results ==
All times are in minutes and seconds.

KEY:	q	Fastest non-qualifiers	Q	Qualified	GR	Games record	NR	National record	PB	Personal best	SB	Seasonal best

=== Final ===
The final was held on October 20.

Rank	Name	Nationality	Time	Notes
1st place, gold medalist(s)	Kim Peyton	United States	2:04.57	GR
2nd place, silver medalist(s)	Gail Amundrud	Canada	2:05.87	
3rd place, bronze medalist(s)	Anne Jardin	Canada	2:07.68	
4	-	-	-	
5	Maria Guimarães	Brazil	2:14.05	
6	-	-	-	
7	-	-	-	
8	-	-	-	
