= Swimming at the 1975 Pan American Games – Men's 100 metre backstroke =

Men's 100 metre backstroke at the 1975 Pan American Games
- Venue: -
- Dates: October 19 (preliminaries and finals)
- Competitors: from - nations

Medalists
Gold medal	Peter Rocca	United States
Silver medal	Bob Jackson	United States
Bronze medal	Rômulo Arantes	Brazil

The men's 100 metre backstroke competition of the swimming events at the 1975 Pan American Games took place on 19 October. The last Pan American Games champion was Mel Nash of US.

This race consisted of two lengths of the pool, all in backstroke.

== Results ==
All times are in minutes and seconds.

KEY:	q	Fastest non-qualifiers	Q	Qualified	GR	Games record	NR	National record	PB	Personal best	SB	Seasonal best

=== Final ===
The final was held on October 19.

Rank	Name	Nationality	Time	Notes
1st place, gold medalist(s)	Peter Rocca	United States	58.31	
2nd place, silver medalist(s)	Bob Jackson	United States	58.90	
3rd place, bronze medalist(s)	Rômulo Arantes	Brazil	59.16	
4	-	-	-	
5	-	-	-	
6	-	-	-	
7	-	-	-	
8	-	-	-	
