= Steve Hardy =

Steve Hardy may refer to:

- Steve Hardy (swimmer) (1957-2025), Canadian swimmer
- Steve Hardy (General Hospital), a character in the General Hospital soap
