= Swimming at the 1975 Pan American Games – Men's 1500 metre freestyle =

Men's 1500 metre freestyle at the 1975 Pan American Games
- Venue: -
- Dates: October 23 (preliminaries and finals)
- Competitors: from - nations

Medalists
Gold medal	Bobby Hackett	United States
Silver medal	Paul Hartloff	United States
Bronze medal	Djan Madruga	Brazil

The men's 1500 metre freestyle competition of the swimming events at the 1975 Pan American Games took place on 23 October. The last Pan American Games champion was Pat Miles of the United States.

This race consisted of thirty lengths of the pool, all lengths being in freestyle.

== Results ==
All times are in minutes and seconds.

KEY:	q	Fastest non-qualifiers	Q	Qualified	GR	Games record	NR	National record	PB	Personal best	SB	Seasonal best

=== Final ===
The final was held on October 23.

Rank	Name	Nationality	Time	Notes
1st place, gold medalist(s)	Bobby Hackett	United States	15:53.10	
2nd place, silver medalist(s)	Paul Hartloff	United States	15:57.32	
3rd place, bronze medalist(s)	Djan Madruga	Brazil	16:30.08	
4	-	-	-	
5	-	-	-	
6	-	-	-	
7	-	-	-	
8	-	-	-	
