= Swimming at the 1971 Pan American Games – Men's 200 metre breaststroke =

Men's 200 metre breaststroke at the 1971 Pan American Games
- Venue: -
- Dates: August 8 (preliminaries and finals)
- Competitors: from - nations

Medalists
Gold medal	Rick Colella	United States
Silver medal	Felipe Muñoz	Mexico
Bronze medal	Brian Job	United States

The men's 200 metre backstroke competition of the swimming events at the 1971 Pan American Games took place on 8 August. The last Pan American Games champion was José Fiolo of Brazil.

This race consisted of four lengths of the pool, all in breaststroke.

== Results ==
All times are in minutes and seconds.

KEY:	q	Fastest non-qualifiers	Q	Qualified	GR	Games record	NR	National record	PB	Personal best	SB	Seasonal best

=== Final ===
The final was held on August 8.

Rank	Name	Nationality	Time	Notes
1st place, gold medalist(s)	Rick Colella	United States	2:27.1	GR
2nd place, silver medalist(s)	Felipe Muñoz	Mexico	2:27.2	
3rd place, bronze medalist(s)	Brian Job	United States	2:28.1	
4	Bill Mahony	Canada	2:29.6	
5	José Sylvio Fiolo	Brazil	2:31.9	
6	Gustavo Salacedo	Mexico	2:33.2	
7	Mike Whitaker	Canada	2:34.2	
8	José de Oliveira	Brazil	2:35.1	
