= Swimming at the 1971 Pan American Games – Women's 100 metre butterfly =

Women's 100 metre butterfly at the 1971 Pan American Games
- Venue: -
- Dates: August 8 (preliminaries and finals)
- Competitors: from - nations

Medalists
| Gold medal | Deena Deardurff | United States |
| Silver medal | Leslie Cliff | Canada |
| Bronze medal | Lucy Burle | Brazil |

The women's 100 metre butterfly competition of the swimming events at the 1971 Pan American Games took place on 8 August. The last Pan American Games champion was Ellie Daniel of US.

This race consisted of two lengths of the pool, all in butterfly.

== Results ==
All times are in minutes and seconds.

| KEY: | q | Fastest non-qualifiers | Q | Qualified | GR | Games record | NR | National record | PB | Personal best | SB | Seasonal best |

=== Final ===
The final was held on August 8.

| Rank | Name | Nationality | Time | Notes |
|---|---|---|---|---|
| 1st place, gold medalist(s) | Deena Deardurff | United States | 1:06.2 | |
| 2nd place, silver medalist(s) | Leslie Cliff | Canada | 1:06.8 | |
| 3rd place, bronze medalist(s) | Lucy Burle | Brazil | 1:08.8 | SA |
| 4 | Alice Jones | United States | 1:08.9 | |
| 5 | Maria Mock | Puerto Rico | 1:10.1 | |
| 6 | Joane Warren | Canada | 1:10.3 | |
| 7 | Maria Hungerbuhler | Brazil | 1:11.5 | |
| 8 | Norma Amezcua | Mexico | 1:12.7 | |
