= Swimming at the 1975 Pan American Games – Men's 100 metre butterfly =

Men's 100 metre butterfly at the 1975 Pan American Games
- Venue: -
- Dates: October 23 (preliminaries and finals)
- Competitors: from - nations

Medalists
Gold medal	Mike Curington	United States
Silver medal	Greg Jagenburg	United States
Bronze medal	Bruce Robertson	Canada

The men's 100 metre butterfly competition of the swimming events at the 1975 Pan American Games took place on 23 October. The last Pan American Games champion was Frank Heckl of the United States.

This race consisted of two lengths of the pool, all in butterfly.

== Results ==
All times are in minutes and seconds.

KEY:	q	Fastest non-qualifiers	Q	Qualified	GR	Games record	NR	National record	PB	Personal best	SB	Seasonal best

=== Final ===
The final was held on October 23.

Rank	Name	Nationality	Time	Notes
1st place, gold medalist(s)	Mike Curington	United States	56.09	
2nd place, silver medalist(s)	Greg Jagenburg	United States	56.13	
3rd place, bronze medalist(s)	Bruce Robertson	Canada	56.80	
4	-	-	-	
5	-	-	-	
6	-	-	-	
7	-	-	-	
8	Axel de Godoy	Brazil	59.30	
