= Swimming at the 1971 Pan American Games – Men's 100 metre breaststroke =

Men's 100 metre breaststroke at the 1971 Pan American Games
- Venue: -
- Dates: August 6 (preliminaries and finals)
- Competitors: from - nations

Medalists
Gold medal	Mark Chatfield	United States
Silver medal	Brian Job	United States
Bronze medal	José Fiolo	Brazil

The men's 100 metre backstroke competition of the swimming events at the 1971 Pan American Games took place on 6 August. The last Pan American Games champion was José Fiolo of Brazil.

This race consisted of two lengths of the pool, both lengths being in breaststroke.

== Results ==
All times are in minutes and seconds.

KEY:	q	Fastest non-qualifiers	Q	Qualified	GR	Games record	NR	National record	PB	Personal best	SB	Seasonal best

=== Final ===
The final was held on August 6.

Rank	Name	Nationality	Time	Notes
1st place, gold medalist(s)	Mark Chatfield	United States	1:06.8	GR
2nd place, silver medalist(s)	Brian Job	United States	1:07.9	
3rd place, bronze medalist(s)	José Fiolo	Brazil	1:07.9	
4	Bill Mahony	Canada	1:08.4	
5	Felipe Muñoz	Mexico	1:08.7	
6	Mike Whitaker	Canada	1:09.8	
7	Gustavo Salcedo	Mexico	1:10.2	
8	Osvaldo Barreto	Argentina	1:11.2	
