= Swimming at the 1971 Pan American Games – Women's 4 × 100 metre freestyle relay =

Women's 4 × 100 metre freestyle relay at the 1971 Pan American Games
- Venue: -
- Dates: August 10 (preliminaries and finals)
- Competitors: from - nations

Medalists
Gold medal	Sandy Neilson, Wendy Fordyce, Katheryn McKitrick and Lynn Skrifvars	United States
Silver medal	Leslie Cliff, Donna Gurr, Gate and Angela Coughlan	Canada
Bronze medal	Rosemary Ribeiro, Cristiane Paquelet, Maria Hungerbuler and Lucy Burle	Brazil

The women's 4 × 100 metre freestyle relay competition of the swimming events at the 1971 Pan American Games took place on 10 August. The defending Pan American Games champion is the United States.

This race consisted of eight lengths of the pool. Each of the four swimmers completed two lengths of the pool. The first swimmer had to touch the wall before the second could leave the starting block.

== Results ==
All times are in minutes and seconds.

KEY:	q	Fastest non-qualifiers	Q	Qualified	GR	Games record	NR	National record	PB	Personal best	SB	Seasonal best

=== Final ===
The final was held on August 10.

Rank	Name	Nationality	Time	Notes
1st place, gold medalist(s)	Sandy Neilson; Wendy Fordyce; Katheryn McKitrick; Lynn Skrifvars	United States	4:04.2	GR
2nd place, silver medalist(s)	Leslie Cliff; Donna Gurr; Gate; Angela Coughlan	Canada	4:10.5	
3rd place, bronze medalist(s)	Rosemary Ribeiro; Cristiane Paquelet; Maria Hungerbuler; Lucy Burle	Brazil	4:15.2	
4	Mora; Laura Vaca; Márcia Arriaga; María Teresa Ramírez	Mexico	4:15.9	
5	Rosalinda Angel; Savedra; Patrícia Clano; Olga de Angulo	Colombia	4:18.8	
6	Bercianos; Castillo; Ospitaleche; Saxiund	Uruguay	4:24.7	
7	Liana Vicens; Del Castillo; Colorado; Maria Mock	Puerto Rico	4:25.4	
8	Canepa; Bello; Maria Barraga; Abad	Peru	4:31.1	
