= North Carolina's 30th House district =

American legislative district

North Carolina's 30th State House of Representatives district
Representative
Marcia Morey; D–Durham
- Demographics: 46% White; 25% Black; 16% Hispanic; 6% Asian; 5% Multiracial
- Population (2024): 94,376

North Carolina's 30th House district is one of 120 districts in the North Carolina House of Representatives. It has been represented by Democrat Marcia Morey since 2017.

== Geography ==
Since 2003, the district has included part of Durham County. The district overlaps with the 22nd Senate district.

== District officeholders ==
=== Multi-member district ===
Representative	Party	Dates	Notes	Representative	Party	Dates	Notes	Representative	Party	Dates	Notes	Representative	Party	Dates	Notes	Representative	Party	Dates	Notes	Counties
District created January 1, 1967.
Wesley Bailey (Winston-Salem)	Democratic	January 1, 1967 – January 1, 1969		Claude Hamrick (Winston-Salem)	Democratic	January 1, 1967 – January 1, 1969	Redistricted from the Forsyth County district.	Howard Jemison (Winston-Salem)	Republican	January 1, 1967 – January 1, 1973		Ronald Ingle (Winston-Salem)	Republican	January 1, 1967 – January 1, 1969		E. M. McKnight (Clemmons)	Republican	January 1, 1967 – January 1, 1973	Redistricted from the Forsyth County district. Redistricted to the 29th district.	1967–1973; All of Forsyth County.
Hamilton Horton Jr. (Winston-Salem)	Republican	January 1, 1969 – January 1, 1971	Retired to run for State Senate.	Marshall Wills (Winston-Salem)	Republican	January 1, 1969 – January 1, 1971		Howard Jemison (Winston-Salem)	Republican	January 1, 1967 – January 1, 1973		C. Dempsey McDaniel (Kernersville)	Republican	January 1, 1969 – January 1, 1973	Redistricted to the 29th district.	E. M. McKnight (Clemmons)	Republican	January 1, 1967 – January 1, 1973	Redistricted from the Forsyth County district. Redistricted to the 29th district.	1967–1973; All of Forsyth County.
E. Lawrence Davis (Winston-Salem)	Democratic	January 1, 1971 – January 1, 1973	Redistricted to the 29th district.	Fred Farmer (Winston-Salem)	Republican	January 1, 1971 – January 1, 1973		Howard Jemison (Winston-Salem)	Republican	January 1, 1967 – January 1, 1973		C. Dempsey McDaniel (Kernersville)	Republican	January 1, 1969 – January 1, 1973	Redistricted to the 29th district.	E. M. McKnight (Clemmons)	Republican	January 1, 1967 – January 1, 1973	Redistricted from the Forsyth County district. Redistricted to the 29th district.	1967–1973; All of Forsyth County.
Jim Mashburn (Lexington)	Republican	January 1, 1973 – January 1, 1975		Joe Hege Jr. (Lexington)	Republican	January 1, 1973 – January 1, 1975	Redistricted from the 31st district.	Gilbert Lee Boger (Mocksville)	Republican	January 1, 1973 – January 1, 1975										1973–1983; All of Davidson and Davie counties.
Larry Leonard (Thomasville)	Democratic	January 1, 1975 – January 1, 1977		John Varner (Lexington)	Democratic	January 1, 1975 – January 1, 1981		Peter Hairston (Advance)	Democratic	January 1, 1975 – December 31, 1977	Resigned.									1973–1983; All of Davidson and Davie counties.
Jim Lambeth (Thomasville)	Democratic	January 1, 1977 – January 1, 1981		John Varner (Lexington)	Democratic	January 1, 1975 – January 1, 1981		Peter Hairston (Advance)	Democratic	January 1, 1975 – December 31, 1977	Resigned.									1973–1983; All of Davidson and Davie counties.
Jim Lambeth (Thomasville)	Democratic	January 1, 1977 – January 1, 1981		John Varner (Lexington)	Democratic	January 1, 1975 – January 1, 1981		Vacant		December 31, 1977 – January 28, 1978										1973–1983; All of Davidson and Davie counties.
Jim Lambeth (Thomasville)	Democratic	January 1, 1977 – January 1, 1981		John Varner (Lexington)	Democratic	January 1, 1975 – January 1, 1981		Ramey Kemp (Mocksville)	Democratic	January 28, 1978 – January 1, 1981	Appointed to finish Hairston's term.									1973–1983; All of Davidson and Davie counties.
Melvin Stamey (Thomasville)	Republican	January 1, 1981 – January 1, 1983		Joe Hege Jr. (Lexington)	Republican	January 1, 1981 – January 1, 1983		Betsy Cochrane (Advance)	Republican	January 1, 1981 – January 1, 1983	Redistricted to the 37th district.									1973–1983; All of Davidson and Davie counties.

=== Single-member district ===
Representative	Party	Dates	Notes	Counties
W. Frank Redding III (Asheboro)	Republican	January 1, 1983 – January 1, 1985	Redistricted from the 24th district.	1983–1993; Parts of Randolph and Chatham counties.
William Boyd (Asheboro)	Republican	January 1, 1985 – January 1, 1989		1983–1993; Parts of Randolph and Chatham counties.
Arlie Culp (Ramseur)	Republican	January 1, 1989 – January 1, 2003	Redistricted to the 67th district.	1983–1993; Parts of Randolph and Chatham counties.
Arlie Culp (Ramseur)	Republican	January 1, 1989 – January 1, 2003	Redistricted to the 67th district.	1993–2003; Parts of Guilford, Randolph, and Chatham counties.
Paul Luebke (Durham)	Democratic	January 1, 2003 – October 29, 2016	Redistricted from the 23rd district. Died. Re-elected posthumously.	2003–Present; Part of Durham County.
Vacant		October 29, 2016 – January 1, 2017		2003–Present; Part of Durham County.
Philip Lehman (Durham)	Democratic	January 1, 2017 – March 30, 2017	Appointed to finish Luebke's term. Resigned.	2003–Present; Part of Durham County.
Vacant		March 25, 2017 – April 5, 2017		2003–Present; Part of Durham County.
Marcia Morey (Durham)	Democratic	April 5, 2017 – Present	Appointed to finish Luebke's term.	2003–Present; Part of Durham County.

== Election results ==
=== 2024 ===
North Carolina House of Representatives 30th district general election, 2024
Party	Candidate	Votes	%
Democratic	Marcia Morey (incumbent)	41,916	100%
Total votes		41,916	100%
Democratic hold			

=== 2022 ===
North Carolina House of Representatives 30th district general election, 2022
Party	Candidate	Votes	%
Democratic	Marcia Morey (incumbent)	29,614	86.36%
Republican	William G. Antico	4,036	11.77%
Libertarian	Guy Meilleur	640	1.87%
Total votes		34,290	100%
Democratic hold			

=== 2020 ===
North Carolina House of Representatives 30th district general election, 2020
Party	Candidate	Votes	%
Democratic	Marcia Morey (incumbent)	41,548	81.68%
Libertarian	Gavin Bell	9,317	18.32%
Total votes		50,865	100%
Democratic hold			

=== 2018 ===
North Carolina House of Representatives 30th district general election, 2018
Party	Candidate	Votes	%
Democratic	Marcia Morey (incumbent)	30,303	73.84%
Republican	B. Angelo Burch Sr.	9,862	24.03%
Libertarian	Matthew Wagoner	872	2.12%
Total votes		41,037	100%
Democratic hold			

=== 2016 ===
North Carolina House of Representatives 30th district general election, 2016
Party	Candidate	Votes	%
Democratic	Paul Luebke (incumbent)	37,094	73.85%
Republican	Elissa Fuchs	13,132	26.15%
Total votes		50,226	100%
Democratic hold			

=== 2014 ===
North Carolina House of Representatives 30th district general election, 2014
Party	Candidate	Votes	%
Democratic	Paul Luebke (incumbent)	23,535	100%
Total votes		23,535	100%
Democratic hold			

=== 2012 ===
North Carolina House of Representatives 30th district general election, 2012
Party	Candidate	Votes	%
Democratic	Paul Luebke (incumbent)	33,697	100%
Total votes		33,697	100%
Democratic hold			

=== 2010 ===
North Carolina House of Representatives 30th district Republican primary election, 2010
Party	Candidate	Votes	%
Republican	Jason Chambers	861	75.07%
Republican	Randy Stewart	286	24.93%
Total votes		1,147	100%

North Carolina House of Representatives 30th district general election, 2010
Party	Candidate	Votes	%
Democratic	Paul Luebke (incumbent)	13,442	64.52%
Republican	Jason Chambers	7,393	35.48%
Total votes		20,835	100%
Democratic hold			

=== 2008 ===
North Carolina House of Representatives 30th district general election, 2008
Party	Candidate	Votes	%
Democratic	Paul Luebke (incumbent)	25,265	85.78%
Libertarian	Sean Haugh	4,189	14.22%
Total votes		29,454	100%
Democratic hold			

=== 2006 ===
North Carolina House of Representatives 30th district general election, 2006
Party	Candidate	Votes	%
Democratic	Paul Luebke (incumbent)	12,033	100%
Total votes		12,033	100%
Democratic hold			

=== 2004 ===
North Carolina House of Representatives 30th district general election, 2004
Party	Candidate	Votes	%
Democratic	Paul Luebke (incumbent)	21,245	88.10%
Libertarian	Sean Haugh	2,870	11.90%
Total votes		24,115	100%
Democratic hold			

=== 2002 ===
North Carolina House of Representatives 30th district general election, 2002
Party	Candidate	Votes	%
Democratic	Paul Luebke (incumbent)	14,017	84.64%
Libertarian	Terry Mancour	2,543	15.36%
Total votes		16,560	100%
Democratic hold			

=== 2000 ===
North Carolina House of Representatives 30th district general election, 2000
Party	Candidate	Votes	%
Republican	Arlie Culp (incumbent)	13,978	62.13%
Democratic	Matilda Phillips	8,040	35.74%
Libertarian	Victoria D. Prevo	479	2.13%
Total votes		22,497	100%
Republican hold			
