= Swimming at the 1971 Pan American Games – Men's 100 metre backstroke =

Men's 100 metre backstroke at the 1971 Pan American Games
- Venue: -
- Dates: August 6 (preliminaries and finals)
- Competitors: from - nations

Medalists
Gold medal	Mel Nash	United States
Silver medal	John Murphy	United States
Bronze medal	Bill Kennedy	Canada

The men's 100 metre backstroke competition of the swimming events at the 1971 Pan American Games took place on 6 August. The last Pan American Games champion was Don Schollander of US.

This race consisted of two lengths of the pool, all in backstroke.

== Results ==
All times are in minutes and seconds.

KEY:	q	Fastest non-qualifiers	Q	Qualified	GR	Games record	NR	National record	PB	Personal best	SB	Seasonal best

=== Final ===
The final was held on August 6.

Rank	Name	Nationality	Time	Notes
1st place, gold medalist(s)	Mel Nash	United States	59.8	
2nd place, silver medalist(s)	John Murphy	United States	1:00.8	
3rd place, bronze medalist(s)	Bill Kennedy	Canada	1:01.4	
4	José Santibáñez	Mexico	1:02.4	
5	César Lourenço	Brazil	1:03.1	
6	Erik Fish	Canada	1:03.7	
7	Rafael Rocha	Mexico	1:03:8	
8	Carlos Yanguas	Colombia	1:05.0	
