= Sérgio Pinto Ribeiro =

Brazilian swimmer (born 1959)

Personal information
- Full name: Sérgio Pinto Ribeiro
- Born: May 27, 1959 (age 67) Porto Alegre, Rio Grande do Sul, Brazil
- Height: 1.81 m (5 ft 11 in)
- Weight: 73 kg (161 lb)

Sport
- Sport: Swimming
- Strokes: Breaststroke

Sérgio Pinto Ribeiro (born May 27, 1959 in Porto Alegre) is a former international breaststroke swimmer from Brazil, who participated in two consecutive Summer Olympics for his native country, starting in 1976.

He was trained by Mauri Fonseca, who participated in the 1964 Summer Olympics, in Tokyo. He swam for the Grêmio Náutico União club, but in 1974, the club finished with amateur sports. His coach Mauri was fired, but he did a contract with the Rio Grande do Sul Federation, to train the state team, and the Federation also covenanted with Grêmio Náutico União to use their pool, which at the time was the only heated pool in the city.

Participated at the inaugural World Aquatics Championships in 1973 Belgrade, replacing José Fiolo. Ribeiro competed in the 200-metre breaststroke, where he did a time of 2:34.07, ranking fifth of his series, however, being eliminated because of an irregular turnaround. He also swam the 100-metre breaststroke.

He was at the 1975 World Aquatics Championships in Cali. In the 100-metre breaststroke, he finished with a time of 1:07.52, near his personal best (1:07.10), but not getting the classification for the final. He also swam the 200-metre breaststroke. In the 4×100-metre medley, he finished 9th, with a time of 4:01.99, along with Rômulo Arantes, Heliani dos Santos and Ruy de Oliveira.

At the 1975 Pan American Games in Mexico City, Ribeiro finished 4th in the 100-metre breaststroke and 4th in the 200-metre breaststroke.

At the 1976 Summer Olympics, in Montreal, he swam the 100-metre and 200-metre breaststroke, not reaching the finals.

At the 1980 Summer Olympics, in Moscow, he finished 8th in the 4×100-metre medley final, breaking the South American record. He also swam the 100-metre breaststroke, not reaching the finals.

He broke the José Fiolo's South American record of the 200-metre breaststroke.
