= Swimming at the 1971 Pan American Games – Women's 200 metre freestyle =

Women's 200 metre freestyle at the 1971 Pan American Games
- Venue: -
- Dates: August 7 (preliminaries and finals)
- Competitors: from - nations

Medalists
| Gold medal | Kim Peyton | United States |
| Silver medal | Angela Coughlan | Canada |
| Bronze medal | Olga de Angulo | Colombia |

The Women's 200 metre freestyle competition of the swimming events at the 1971 Pan American Games took place on 7 August. The last Pan American Games champion was Pam Kruse of US.

This race consisted of four lengths of the pool, all in freestyle.

== Results ==
All times are in minutes and seconds.

| KEY: | q | Fastest non-qualifiers | Q | Qualified | GR | Games record | NR | National record | PB | Personal best | SB | Seasonal best |

=== Final ===
The final was held on August 7.

| Rank | Name | Nationality | Time | Notes |
|---|---|---|---|---|
| 1st place, gold medalist(s) | Kim Peyton | United States | 2:09.6 | GR |
| 2nd place, silver medalist(s) | Angela Coughlan | Canada | 2:10.6 | NR |
| 3rd place, bronze medalist(s) | Olga de Angulo | Colombia | 2:14.3 | SA |
| 4 | Karen James | Canada | 2:15.2 | |
| 5 | Lucy Burle | Brazil | 2:15.7 | NR |
| 6 | Márcia Arriaga | Mexico | 2:18.6 | |
| 7 | Rosemary Ribeiro | Brazil | 2:19.8 | |
| 8 | Liana Vicens | Puerto Rico | 2:20.7 | |
