= Swimming at the 1975 Pan American Games =

The Swimming competition at the 7th Pan American Games was held in Mexico City, Mexico during the Games' run in 1975. It consisted of 29 long course (50 m) events: 15 for males and 14 for females.

== Results ==
=== Men's events ===
Event	Gold		Silver		Bronze	
100 m freestyle	Richard Abbott (United States) USA	51.96	Jack Babashoff (United States) USA	52.26	Bruce Robertson; Canada	53.44
200 m freestyle	Jorge Delgado; Ecuador	1:55.45	Rick DeMont (United States) USA	1:55.96	Rex Favero (United States) USA	1:57.08
400 m freestyle	Douglas Northway (United States) USA	4:00.51	Bobby Hackett (United States) USA	4:03.38	Djan Madruga; Brazil	4:06.83
1500 m freestyle	Bobby Hackett (United States) USA	15:53.10	Paul Hartloff (United States) USA	15:57.32	Djan Madruga; Brazil	16:30.08
100 m backstroke	Peter Rocca (United States) USA	58.31	Bob Jackson (United States) USA	58.90	Rômulo Arantes; Brazil	59.16
200 m backstroke	Dan Harrigan (United States) USA	2:06.69	Mike Scarth; Canada	2:09.20	Bob Jackson (United States) USA	2:10.18
100 m breaststroke	Rick Colella (United States) USA	1:06.28	Lawrence Dowler (United States) USA	1:06.61	José Fiolo; Brazil	1:08.12
200 m breaststroke	Rick Colella (United States) USA	2:24.00	Dave Heinbuch; Canada	2:28.96	Gustavo Lozano; Mexico	2:29.28
100 m butterfly	Mike Curington (United States) USA	56.09	Greg Jagenburg (United States) USA	56.13	Bruce Robertson (Canada) CAN	56.80
200 m butterfly	Greg Jagenburg (United States) USA	2:03.42	Steve Gregg (United States) USA	2:04.06	Jorge Delgado; Ecuador	2:05.11
200 m I.M.	Steve Furniss (United States) USA	2:09.77	Mike Curington (United States) USA	2:10.17	Bill Sawchuk; Canada	2:11.63
400 m I.M.	Steve Furniss (United States) USA	4:40.38 GR	Rick Colella (United States) USA	4:40.91	Ricardo Marmolejo; Mexico	4:43.87
4 × 100 m Free Relay	(United States) USA; Jack Babashoff; Art Ruble; Mike Grattan; Richard Abbott	3:27.67	Canada; Bruce Robertson; Gary MacDonald; Michael Bloahdal; Steve Hardy	3:36.24	Mexico; Guillermo García; Eduardo Pérez; Jorge Necochea; Ricardo Sasser	3:39.17
4 × 200 m Free Relay	(United States) USA; Rick DeMont; Rex Favero; Brad Horner; Michael Curington	7:50.96	Canada; Steve Hardy; Michael Bloahdal; Daryl Skilling; Bruce Robertson	8:00.91	Brazil; Djan Madruga; José Namorado; Paul Jovanneau; Rômulo Arantes	8:02.36
4 × 100 m Medley Relay	(United States) USA; Peter Rocca; Rick Colella; Michael Curington; Jack Babashoff	3:53.81	Canada; Michael Scarth; Camil Chevalier; Bruce Robertson; Gary MacDonald	3:58.95	Brazil; Akcel de Godoy; José Namorado; Rômulo Arantes; José Fiolo	3:59.05

=== Women's events ===
Event	Gold		Silver		Bronze	
100 m freestyle	Kim Peyton (United States) USA	58.24	Jill Sterkel (United States) USA	58.57	Jill Quirk; Canada	58.92
200 m freestyle	Kim Peyton (United States) USA	2:04.57 GR	Gail Amundrud; Canada	2:05.87	Anne Jardin; Canada	2:07.68
400 m freestyle	Kathy Heddy (United States) USA	4:23.00 GR	Kathie Wickstrand (United States) USA	4:27.66	Michele Oliver; Canada	4:30.20
800 m freestyle	Wendy Weinberg (United States) USA	9:05.57	Mary Montgomery (United States) USA	9:06.70	Janice Stenhouse; Canada	9:17.87
100 m backstroke	Lynn Chénard; Canada	1:06.59 GR	Rosemary Boone (United States) USA	1:07.18	Jenny Kemp (United States) USA	1:07.29
200 m backstroke	Donna Wennerstrom (United States) USA	2:19.93 GR	Lynn Chénard; Canada	2:21.26	Cheryl Gibson; Canada	2:22.68
100 m breaststroke	Lauri Siering (United States) USA	1:15.17	Marcia Morey (United States) USA	1:16.25	Marion Stuart; Canada	1:16.40
200 m breaststroke	Lauri Siering (United States) USA	2:42.35	Joann Baker; Canada	2:42.96	Marcia Morey (United States) USA	2:45.58
100 m butterfly	Camille Wright (United States) USA	1:02.71	Peggy Tosdal (United States) USA	1:03.37	Wendy Quirk; Canada	1:05.07
200 m butterfly	Camille Wright (United States) USA	2:18.57	Cheryl Gibson; Canada	2:21.95	Rosemary Ribeiro; Brazil	2:22.47
200 m I.M.	Kathy Heddy (United States) USA	2:22.22	Jennie Franks (United States) USA	2:23.37	Cheryl Gibson; Canada	2:24.22
400 m I.M.	Kathy Heddy (United States) USA	5:06.05	Cheryl Gibson; Canada	5:06.87	Jennie Franks (United States) USA	5:08.68
4 × 100 m Freestyle Relay	(United States) USA; Kathy Heddy; Bonnee Brown; Jill Sterkel; Kim Peyton	3:53.31	Canada; Gail Amundrud; Anne Jardin; Wendy Quirk; Janice Stenhouse	3:54.95	Brazil; Christiane Paquelet; Lucy Burle; Maria Guimarães; Rosemary Ribeiro	4:12.20
4 × 100 m Medley Relay	(United States) USA; Rosemary Bonne; Marcia Morey; Camille Wright; Kim Peyton	4:22.34	Canada; Lynn Chenard; Joanne Baker; Wendy Quirk; Jill Quirk	4:24.84	Brazil; Christiane Paquelet; Cristina Teixeira; Flávia Nadalutti; Lucy Burle	4:37.67

== Medal table ==
Rank	Nation	Gold	Silver	Bronze	Total
1	United States	27	17	5	49
2	Canada	1	12	11	24
3	Ecuador	1	0	1	2
4	Brazil	0	0	9	9
5	Mexico	0	0	3	3
Totals (5 entries)		29	29	29	87
