= Philip A. Lehman =

American politician from North Carolina

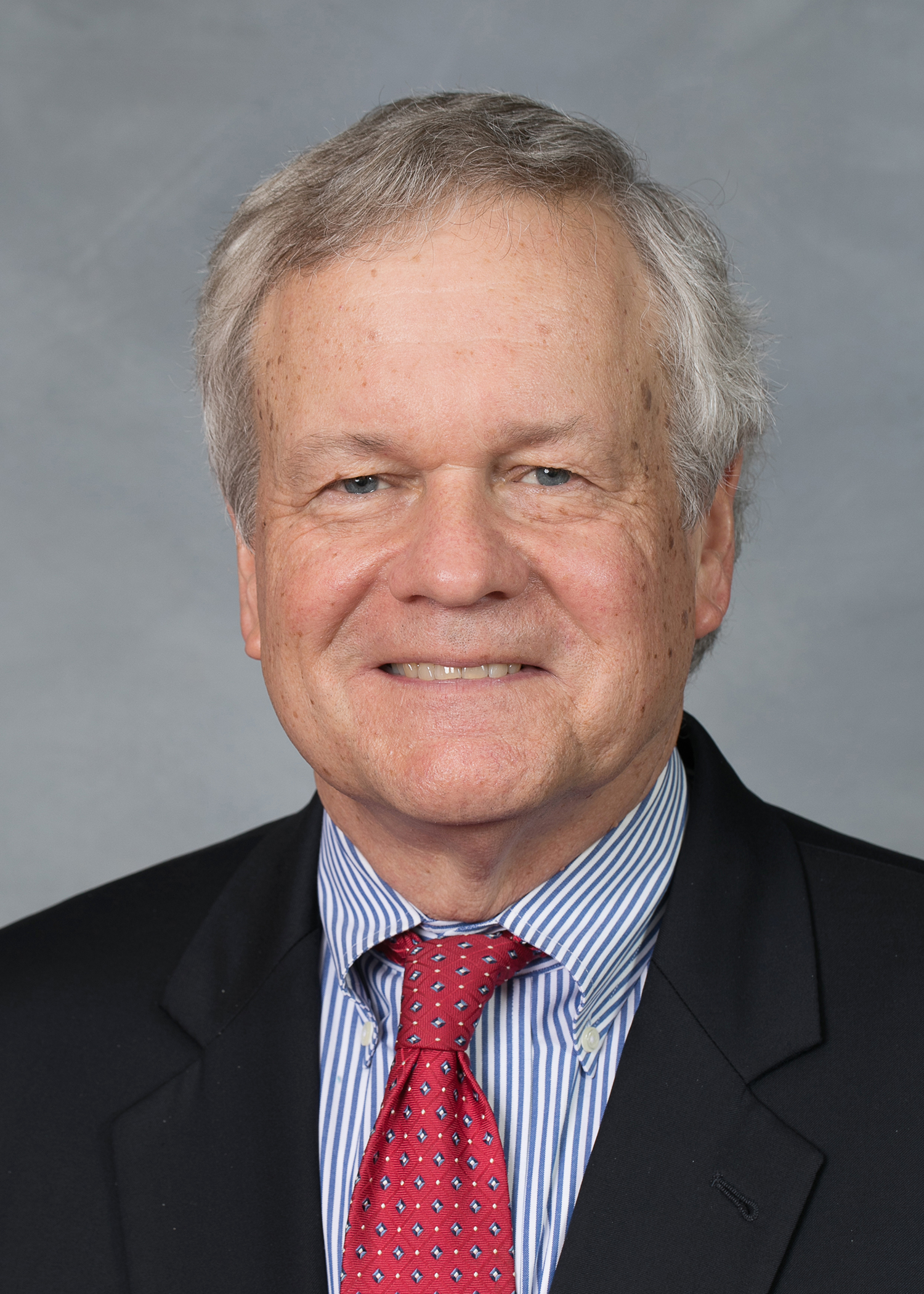

Member of the North Carolina House of Representatives from the 30th district
- In office January 1, 2017 – March 30, 2017
- Preceded by: Paul Luebke
- Succeeded by: Marcia Morey

Personal details
- Born: November 3, 1946 (age 79)
- Party: Democratic
- Occupation: Lawyer

Philip A. Lehman (born November 3, 1946) is an American attorney, civil servant, and politician who has served in various roles in North Carolina government and community organizations. He was appointed to the North Carolina House of Representatives in 2017 following the death of Paul Luebke. A Democrat, he served the 30th district.

Lehman is best known for his work as an Assistant Attorney General in the Consumer Protection Division of the North Carolina Department of Justice, where he specialized in combating predatory lending practices. He is a Vietnam War veteran who served as a naval officer in the United States Navy. Lehman holds a Bachelor of Arts degree from Harvard University and a Juris Doctor from Catholic University of America.

== Committee assignments ==
- Environment
- Finance
- Judiciary III
- Pensions and Retirement
- State and Local Government II

North Carolina House of Representatives
Preceded by Paul Luebke	Member of the North Carolina House of Representatives from the 30th district 2017	Succeeded by Marcia Morey
