= Bruce Robertson (swimmer) =

Canadian swimmer (born 1953)

Personal information
- Full name: Bruce Richard Robertson
- National team: Canada
- Born: April 27, 1953 (age 73) Vancouver, British Columbia, Canada
- Height: 1.78 m (5 ft 10 in)
- Weight: 70 kg (154 lb)

Sport
- Sport: Swimming
- Events: 100 metre Butterfly; 4x100 metre medley relay
- Strokes: Freestyle, butterfly
- Club: Canadian Dolphin Swim Club
- College team: Simon Fraser University
- Coach: Deryk Snelling (Dolphins)
Medal record
Men's swimming
Representing Canada
Olympic Games
Silver medal – second place	1972 Munich	100 m butterfly
Bronze medal – third place	1972 Munich	4×100 m medley
World Championships (LC)
Gold medal – first place	1973 Belgrade	100 m butterfly
Bronze medal – third place	1973 Belgrade	4×100 m medley
Pan American Games
Silver medal – second place	1975 Mexico City	4×100 m freestyle
Silver medal – second place	1975 Mexico City	4×200 m freestyle
Silver medal – second place	1975 Mexico City	4×100 m medley
Bronze medal – third place	1975 Mexico City	100 m freestyle
Bronze medal – third place	1975 Mexico City	100 m butterfly
Commonwealth Games
Gold medal – first place	1974 Christchurch	4×100 m freestyle
Gold medal – first place	1974 Christchurch	4×100 m medley
Silver medal – second place	1974 Christchurch	100 m freestyle
Silver medal – second place	1974 Christchurch	200 m freestyle
Bronze medal – third place	1974 Christchurch	100 m butterfly
Bronze medal – third place	1974 Christchurch	4×200 m freestyle

Bruce Richard Robertson, CM (born April 27, 1953) is a Canadian former freestyle and butterfly swimmer who competed for Simon Fraser University and represented Canada receiving a silver and bronze medal at the 1972 Munich Olympics.

Robertson was born April 27, 1953, in Vancouver. He was active in swimming from the age of six, and at 16 in 1969 swam for Vancouver's Canadian Dolphins team, a highly competitive program under Hall of Fame Coach Deryk Snelling. Founded in 1955 by Coach Howard Firby, Snelling took over as Head Coach of the Dolphins in 1967.

== 1972-1976 Olympics ==
Robertson competed for Canada at two consecutive Summer Olympics, starting in 1972 in Munich. There he won the silver medal in the 100-metre butterfly, and bronze in the 4×100-metre medley relay, alongside Erik Fish, William Mahony and Robert Kasting.

At the 1976 Summer Olympics in Montreal, he placed 19th in the 100-metre freestyle, and 12th in the 100-metre butterfly.

A specialist in the butterfly stroke, his greatest achievement was winning the 100-metre butterfly race at the 1973 World Aquatics Championships in Belgrade – the first world championship swimming performance by a Canadian in over 60 years. Robertson also swam on the third place 4×100-metre medley relay team there. At the 1974 British Commonwealth Games in Christchurch, he won two gold, two silver and two bronze medals.

Despite being of Canadian nationality he won the ASA National British Championships title over 100 metres butterfly in 1971.

=== Post-competition pursuits ===
He retired from competitive swimming in 1977, and went back to Simon Fraser University in Burnaby, British Columbia to swim on their varsity team. He completed his Bachelor of General Studies in 1977.

He currently lives in Manotick, Ontario, and swims with the Nepean Masters Swim Club in Barrhaven, Ontario. He holds Canadian Masters national age-group records in the 100m freestyle and 200m freestyle.

Highly active in the administration of Canadian national swimming, he has served as Vice-President of the Commonwealth Games Foundation, as a ex-officio member of the Board of Commonwealth Games Canada, and as a member of the Board of the Commonwealth Games Foundation.

=== Honors ===
In 1972 and 1974, Robertson received the Edward Beatty Award, as the Outstanding male swimmer from Canada. In 1973, he was named male Athlete of the Year. In 1974, he was named to the Order of Canada. He was awarded the Queen Elizabeth II Golden Jubilee Medal in 2002. In 1977, he was inducted into Canada's Sports Hall of Fame. Robertson became a member of the Canadian Olympic Hall of Fame in 1973, the British Columbia Sports Hall of Fame in 1978 (his father Sandy is also a member), and both the Canadian Aquatic Hall of Fame and the Swimming Canada Circle.

== See also ==
- List of Commonwealth Games medallists in swimming (men)
- List of Olympic medalists in swimming (men)
