= Marco Paradeda =

Brazilian sailor

Personal information
- Born: 15 January 1945 (age 80); Porto Alegre, Brazil

Sport
- Sport: Sailing

Marco Paradeda (born 15 January 1945) is a Brazilian sailor. He competed at the 1976 Summer Olympics and the 1984 Summer Olympics.
