= Maripá de Minas =

Coordinates: 21.6978°S 42.9589°W

- Municipality
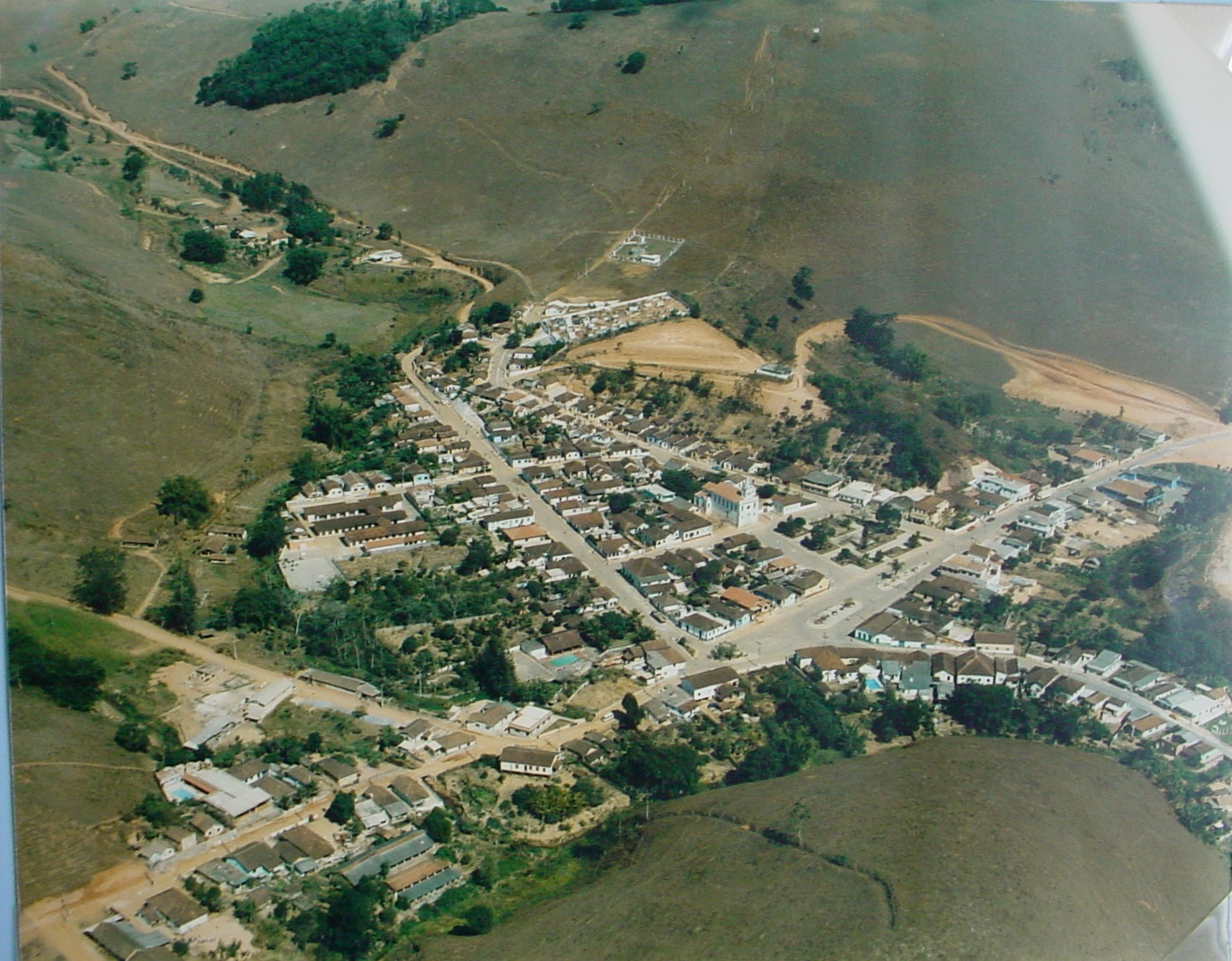

- Coat of arms
- Interactive map of Maripá de Minas
- Country: Brazil
- Region: Southeast
- State: Minas Gerais
- Mesoregion: Zona da Mata

Population (2020)
  - Total: 2,987
- Time zone: UTC−3 (BRT)

Maripá de Minas is a municipality in the state of Minas Gerais in the Southeast region of Brazil.

== See also ==
- List of municipalities in Minas Gerais
