= Kim Peyton =

American swimmer (1957–1986)

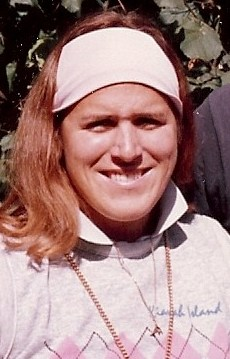
- Peyton with her Olympic medal in fall 1984

Personal information
- Full name: Kimberly Marie Peyton
- Nickname: "Kim"
- National team: United States
- Born: January 26, 1957 Hood River, Oregon, U.S.
- Died: December 13, 1986 (aged 29) Stanford, California, U.S.
- Height: 5 ft 10 in (1.78 m)
- Weight: 141 lb (64 kg)
- Spouse: Andrew McDonald

Sport
- Sport: Swimming
- Strokes: Freestyle
- Club: David Douglas Swim Club
- College team: Stanford University
Medal record
Women's swimming
Representing the United States
Olympic Games
Gold medal – first place	1976 Montreal	4x100 m freestyle
World Championships (LC)
Silver medal – second place	1973 Belgrade	4x100 m freestyle
Pan American Games
Gold medal – first place	1971 Cali	200 m freestyle
Gold medal – first place	1975 Mexico City	100 m freestyle
Gold medal – first place	1975 Mexico City	200 m freestyle
Gold medal – first place	1975 Mexico City	4x100 m freestyle
Gold medal – first place	1975 Mexico City	4x100 m medley

Kim Marie Peyton (January 26, 1957 – December 13, 1986), also known by her married name Kim McDonald, was an American swimmer and Olympic gold medalist at the 1976 Summer Olympics. She was inducted into the Oregon Sports Hall of Fame in 1989, three years after her death at age 29 from a brain tumor.

== Youth and high school ==
Peyton set three national swimming records when she was only 9 and 10 years old.

She swam for the David Douglas High School Swim Club in Portland, Oregon, where she held numerous Oregon Class 4A swim records including 200-yard medley relay (1974, 1975, 1976); 200-yard freestyle (1972, 1974, 1975); 50-yard freestyle (1971); 100-yard freestyle (1972, 1974); 500-yard freestyle (1975); 200-yard freestyle relay (1971, 1972); 400-yard freestyle relay (1974, 1975); 400-yard freestyle (1971).

=== Oregon Girls Swimming Title ===
Peyton broke her own Oregon 17–18 girls 400-meter freestyle record on August 1, 1974. Her record time of 4:20.35 held through July 26, 1997, when Lauren Thies set a new record of 4:15.97.

== Pan American Games ==
She participated in two Pan American Games: in 1971 Pan American Games in Cali, Colombia, and the 1975 Pan American Games in Mexico City. In 1971, she won a gold medal in the 200m freestyle; in 1975, she won four gold medals: in the 100m freestyle, the 200m freestyle, the 4 × 100 m freestyle relay, and the 4 × 100 m medley relay. She was chosen as United States' flag bearer for the closing ceremonies of the 1975 games held at Aztec Stadium.

== Olympics ==
Peyton represented the United States at the 1972 Summer Olympics in Munich as a backup swimmer. In the 1976 Summer Olympics in Montreal, Quebec, she won a gold medal in the 4×100-meter freestyle relay with teammates Jill Sterkel, Shirley Babashoff, and Wendy Boglioli, setting a new world record with a time of 3:44.82. This record would stand until August 26, 1978, when another United States swim team of Cynthia Woodhead, Jill Sterkel, Stephanie Elkins and Tracy Caulkins broke it with a time of 3:43.43 in West Berlin.

== Stanford University ==
Peyton attended Stanford University, where she swam for the Stanford Cardinal swimming and diving team under Hall of Fame Head Coach James Gaughran. With strategic recruiting, Stanford included a second Olympian Jo Harshbarger, who was one of the earliest women to receive an athletic scholarship for swimming. A freestyle distance swimmer like Peyton, Harshbarger competed in the 800-meter freestyle in the 1972 Munich Olympics.

In March 1978, while swimming for Stanford, Peyton helped the team move from seventh to fourth place at the Association for Intercollegiate Athletics for Women's (AIAW) National Championships in Durham, North Carolina with a second place in the 200 freestyle and a seventh in the 50 freestyle.

At Stanford, Peyton met her husband Drew McDonald, who won a silver medal as a member of the 1984 U.S. Olympic water polo team.

== Honors ==
Peyton-McDonald was honored in 1975 with the Bill Hayward Johnny Carpenter Prep athlete of the year award as the Outstanding Amateur Athlete in Oregon. In 1989, she was inducted posthumously into the Oregon Sports Hall of Fame. The relay team of Kim Peyton, Wendy Bogioli, Jill Sterkel, Shirley Babashoff and Jennifer Hooker, who swam in the preliminary heats, was inducted into the U.S. Olympic & Paralympic Hall of Fame in 2022. Stanford established The Kim Peyton McDonald Memorial Scholarship in her honor.

== Death ==
Peyton-McDonald died on December 13, 1986, at the age of 29 as a result of an inoperable brain tumor that she first disclosed to the public in 1979.

== See also ==
- List of Olympic medalists in swimming (women)
- List of Stanford University people
- List of World Aquatics Championships medalists in swimming (women)
- World record progression 4 × 100 metres freestyle relay

== Bibliography ==
- De George, Matthew, Pooling Talent: Swimming's Greatest Teams, Rowman & Littlefield, Lanham, Maryland (2014). ISBN 978-1-4422-3701-8.
