= Erik Fish =

Canadian swimmer (born 1952)

Personal information
- Full name: Erik J. Fish
- National team: Canada
- Born: May 19, 1952 (age 74) Medicine Hat, Alberta
- Height: 1.94 m (6 ft 4 in)
- Weight: 81 kg (179 lb)

Sport
- Sport: Swimming
- Strokes: Backstroke
- College team: Yale University
Medal record
Men's swimming
Representing Canada
Olympic Games
Bronze medal – third place	1972 Munich	4x100 m medley
Commonwealth Games
Bronze medal – third place	1970 Edinburgh	100 m backstroke
Universiade
Bronze medal – third place	1973 Moscow	100 m backstroke

Erik J. Fish (born May 19, 1952) is a Canadian former competition swimmer and backstroke specialist who competed for his native country at the 1972 Summer Olympics in Munich, West Germany. As a member of the Canadian third-place team in the men's 4x100-metre medley relay, he won a bronze medal alongside teammates William Mahony, Bruce Robertson and Robert Kasting.

== See also ==
- List of Commonwealth Games medallists in swimming (men)
- List of Olympic medalists in swimming (men)
