= Marcia Morey =

American politician and Olympic swimmer

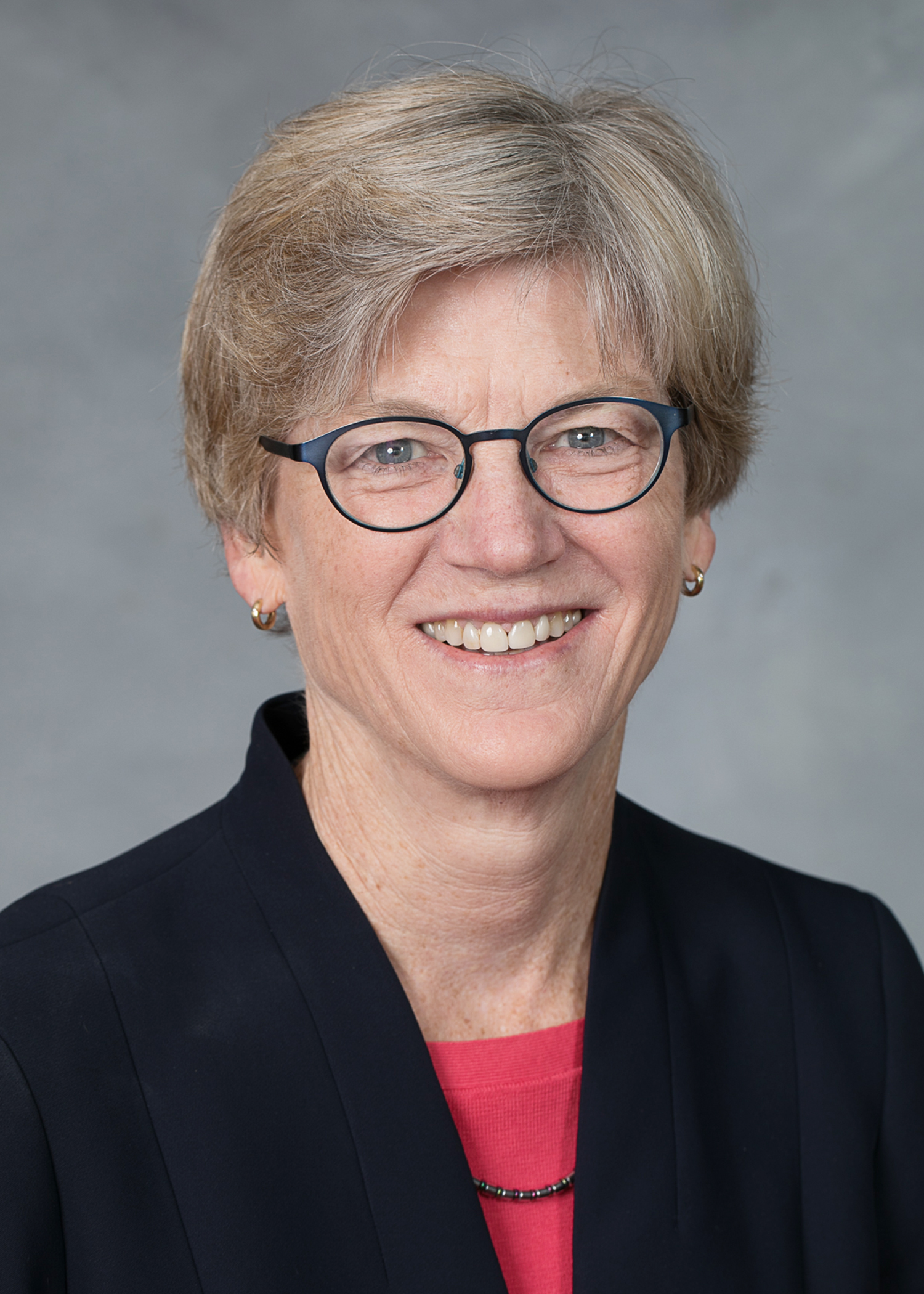

Member of the North Carolina House of Representatives from the 30th district
- Incumbent
- Assumed office April 5, 2017
- Preceded by: Philip Lehman

Personal details
- Born: Marcia Helen Morey; August 14, 1955 (age 71) Decatur, Illinois, U.S.
- Party: Democratic
- Education: Millikin University (BA); Reed College (MEd); Northwestern University (JD)
- Sports career
- National team: United States
- Height: 5 ft 9 in (1.75 m)
- Weight: 146 lb (66 kg)
- Sport: Swimming
- Strokes: Breaststroke
- College team: Millikin University
Medal record
Women's swimming
Representing the United States
World Championships
Silver medal – second place	1973 Belgrade	4×100 m medley
Silver medal – second place	1975 Cali	4×100 m medley
Bronze medal – third place	1975 Cali	100 m breaststroke
Pan American Games
Gold medal – first place	1975 Mexico City	4×100 m medley
Silver medal – second place	1975 Mexico City	100 m breaststroke
Bronze medal – third place	1975 Mexico City	200 m breaststroke

Marcia Helen Morey (born August 14, 1955) is an American politician, former judge and former competition swimmer who represented the United States at the 1976 Summer Olympics in Montreal. She competed in the preliminary heats of the women's 100-meter breaststroke and 200-meter breaststroke events, recording times of 1:17.30 and 2:41.85, respectively. Morey has represented the 30th district in the North Carolina House of Representatives since her initial appointment in 2017. She has been re-elected to the seat twice, most recently in 2020.

A graduate of Millikin University, she served as the Chief District Court Judge of the 14th Judicial District in North Carolina. before being appointed to the North Carolina House of Representatives in April 2017 by Governor Roy Cooper to fill a vacancy.

Prior to joining the legislature, she served the 14th Judicial District Court as a district court judge for 18 years and as Chief District Court Judge for 5 years. Morey worked with law enforcement, defense attorneys, and prosecutors to develop new ways to deal with 16 and 17 year-olds who had been charged with a crime. She spearheaded a program, called the "Misdemeanor Diversion Program (MDP)," that diverts these youths to education and community service programs that allows the teens to avoid a criminal record which enables them to find jobs and receive financial aid for college. MDP has helped over 300 youth and is now a model that has been copied across North Carolina.

In 1998, Governor Jim Hunt appointed Morey as the executive director of the Governor’s Commission on Juvenile Crime and Justice to reform North Carolina's juvenile justice system. During her tenure juvenile crime rates were reduced by approximately 40%. She previously served as an assistant district attorney in Durham and created the first diversionary program in the state (and second in the nation) for first-time youthful offenders charged with misdemeanors in district court in 1994, The Durham County Teen Court & Restitution Program..

Morey earned her undergraduate degree from Millikin University in Illinois, her master's degree in education from Reed College, and her J.D. from Northwestern University Law School.

Morey grew up in Decatur, Illinois. Both parents were active in their community and taught her the importance of giving back. Her father was a World War II and Korean War veteran, attorney, and city councilman. At the age of six years old, Morey became a competitive swimmer. She went on to win 7 national titles, competed in two world championship meets, and was co-captain of the U.S. Olympic Team at the 1976 Montreal games.

Morey is a lesbian. She is one of three openly LGBT members of the North Carolina General Assembly, alongside Reps. Deb Butler (D–Wilmington), and Allison Dahle (D-Raleigh). She's a member of the Progressive House Caucus.

== Committee assignments ==
=== 2023-2024 session ===
- Appropriations
- Appropriations - Justice and Public Safety
- Education - K-12
- Families, Children, and Aging Policy
- Judiciary II

=== 2021-2022 session ===
- Appropriations
- Appropriations - Justice and Public Safety
- Education - Universities
- Families, Children, and Aging Policy
- Judiciary II
- Transportation

=== 2019-2020 session ===
- Appropriations
- Appropriations - Capital
- Education - Universities
- Judiciary
- Transportation

== Electoral history ==
=== 2022 ===
North Carolina House of Representatives 30th district general election, 2022
Party	Candidate	Votes	%
Democratic	Marcia Morey (incumbent)	29,614	86.36%
Republican	William Antico	4,036	11.77%
Libertarian	Guy Meilleur	640	1.87%
Total votes		34,290	100%
Democratic hold			

=== 2020 ===
North Carolina House of Representatives 30th district general election, 2020
Party	Candidate	Votes	%
Democratic	Marcia Morey (incumbent)	41,548	81.68%
Libertarian	Gavin Bell	9,317	18.32%
Total votes		50,865	100%
Democratic hold			

=== 2018 ===
North Carolina House of Representatives 30th district general election, 2018
Party	Candidate	Votes	%
Democratic	Marcia Morey (incumbent)	30,303	73.84%
Republican	B. Angelo Burch Sr.	9,862	24.03%
Libertarian	Matthew Wagoner	872	2.12%
Total votes		41,037	100%
Democratic hold			

North Carolina House of Representatives
Preceded by Philip Lehman	Member of the North Carolina House of Representatives from the 30th district 2017-Present	Incumbent

== See also ==
- List of World Aquatics Championships medalists in swimming (women)
