= Ivan Mikolutsky =

Belarusian swimmer

Personal information
- Nationality: Belarusian
- Born: 3 January 1960 (age 66) Mogilev, Soviet Union

Sport
- Sport: Swimming

Ivan Mikolutsky (born 3 January 1960) is a Belarusian former swimmer. He competed in two events at the 1976 Summer Olympics representing the Soviet Union.
