= Orlando Catinchi =

Puerto Rican swimmer (born 1957)

Personal information
- Born: May 6, 1957 (age 69)
Medal record
Men's Swimming
Representing Puerto Rico
Pan American Games
Bronze medal – third place	1979 San Juan	4x100m Medley

Orlando Catinchi (born May 6, 1957 is a retired male breaststroke and freestyle swimmer from Puerto Rico. He competed for his native country at the 1976 Summer Olympics in Montréal, Canada, aged nineteen.

Two years later Berrocal won the bronze medal in the Men's 4 × 100 m Medley Relay at the 1979 Pan American Games, alongside Carlos Berrocal, Arnaldo Pérez, and Fernando Cañales.
