= Lawrence Dowler =

American swimmer (born 1954)

Personal information
- Full name: Lawrence Robert Dowler
- National team: United States
- Born: February 20, 1954 (age 72) Camp Pendleton, California
- Height: 6 ft 3 in (1.91 m)
- Weight: 179 lb (81 kg)

Sport
- Sport: Swimming
- Event: 100-meter breaststroke
- Club: Arlington Swim Club
- College team: U. Texas Arlington (UTA)
- Coach: Don Easterling Arlington Swim Club; Reese Jameson, Gary Fancell (UTA); Doc Counsilman (Olympics)
Medal record
Men's swimming
Representing the United States
Pan American Games
Silver medal – second place	1975 Mexico City	100 m breaststroke

Lawrence Robert Dowler (born February 20, 1954) is an American former competition swimmer who trained and competed for the University of Texas at Arlington, and participated in the 1976 Summer Olympics in Montreal, Quebec. At the Olympics, he competed in the 100-meter breaststroke, and advanced to the event semifinals, placing ninth overall.

== Early years ==
Lawrence Dowler was born February 20, 1954 in Camp Pendleton, California to Mr. and Mrs. Moe Dowler. His father, who served in the Marines and spent summers on Reserve Duty, would later work as a principal at North Oaks Junior High School in Haltom City, Texas. At the age of 14, Larry first tried out for the strong program at the Arlington Swim Club, once known as the Burford Swim Club, where he swam for University of Texas Arlington Coaches Don Easterling and Doug Russell. Dowler attended and swam for Fort Worth's Carter High School, where he improved dramatically in his Senior year.

Showing remarkable improvement in a single year, in 1974 he placed 24th in his backstroke event in the AAU Outdoor National Championship, then moved up to second place in the event in August, 1975.

== University of Texas Arlington ==
Dowler swam for the University of Texas, Arlington, where he graduated in 1977 and trained and competed for coaches Reese Jameson and Gary Fancell. In February, 1975, in a meet against North Carolina State, Dowler set an U.T. Arlington pool record in the 400-yard medley relay with a combined time of 3:32.4. Dowler swam the breaststroke leg with the team of Steve Madden, David Perkins, and Bill Miller. He won the 200-yard breaststroke with a time of 2:16.7.

In a high point in international competition, Dowler won a silver medal at the 1975 Pan American games in the 100-meter breaststroke in Ciudad de México with a time of 1:06.19.

== 1976 Montreal Olympics ==
Dowler participated in the 1976 Montreal Olympics where he competed in the 100-meter breaststroke, where he advanced to the semi-finals and tied for ninth place with a time of 1:05.19. The time was Dowler's personal best, a U.T. Arlington record, and the best time ever swum by a Texan. The competition in the event was considerable with American John Henken breaking the world record in the final. In Montreal he was managed by Head Coach, and Hall of Fame inductee James Counsilman, the swim coach at Indiana University. An exceptional year for U.S. swimmers, the men's team won 26 medals in individual events, and set eleven world records. In the 100-meter breast, outstanding U.S. swimmer John Henken won the gold with a time of 1:03.11, British swimmer David Wilkie won the silver with a time of 1:03.43, and Russian swimmer Arvydas Jouzaitis won the bronze with a 1:04.23.

=== Honors ===
Dowler was inducted into the UT Arlington Athletic Hall of Honor in 1998.
