= Swimming at the 1971 Pan American Games – Women's 4 × 100 metre medley relay =

Women's 4 × 100 meter medley relay at the 1971 Pan American Games
- Venue: -
- Dates: August 6 (preliminaries and finals)
- Competitors: from - nations

Medalists
Gold medal	-	Canada
Silver medal	-	United States
Bronze medal	-	Mexico

The women's 4 × 100 meter medley relay competition of the swimming events at the 1971 Pan American Games took place on 6 August. The defending Pan American Games champion is the United States.

It was the first time that the U.S. lost the gold in a relay event, at the Pan American Games.

== Results ==
All times are in minutes and seconds.

KEY:	q	Fastest non-qualifiers	Q	Qualified	GR	Games record	NR	National record	PB	Personal best	SB	Seasonal best

=== Final ===
The final was held on August 6.

Rank	Name	Nationality	Time	Notes
1st place, gold medalist(s)	- - - -	Canada	4:33.5	
2nd place, silver medalist(s)	- - - -	United States	4:36.7	
3rd place, bronze medalist(s)	- - - -	Mexico	4:45.2	
4	- - - -	Colombia	4:50.3	
5	Cristiane Paquelet; Eliane Pereira; Maria Teresa Hugerbuhler; Lucy Burle	Brazil	4:52.2	
6	- - - -	Puerto Rico	4:53.9	
7	- - - -	Uruguay	5:38.7	
8	- - - -	Peru	5:38.9	
