= Olga de Angulo =

Colombian swimmer (1955–2011)

Personal information
- Nationality: Colombian
- Born: 26 November 1955 Cali, Colombia
- Died: 8 February 2011 (aged 55) Vancouver, British Columbia, Canada

Sport
- Sport: Swimming
Medal record
Representing Colombia
Women's swimming
Pan American Games
Bronze medal – third place	1971 Cali	200 m freestyle
Central American and Caribbean Games
Gold medal – first place	1970 Panama City	400 m freestyle
Gold medal – first place	1970 Panama City	200 m butterfly

Olga Lucía de Angulo Irragorri (26 November 1955 – 8 February 2011) was a Colombian swimmer. She competed at the 1968 Summer Olympics and the 1972 Summer Olympics. She finished third in the 1971 Pan American Games 200 metres freestyle. De Angulo had lived in Vancouver, Canada since 1998.
