= Ryszard Żugaj =

Polish swimmer (born 1957)

Personal information
- Born: 12 July 1957 (age 69) Krotoszyn, Poland

Sport
- Sport: Swimming

Ryszard Żugaj (born 12 July 1957) is a Polish former backstroke swimmer. He competed in two events at the 1976 Summer Olympics.
