= Igor Omelchenko =

Georgian swimmer

Personal information
- Born: 12 November 1960 (age 65) Batumi, Soviet Union

Sport
- Sport: Swimming

Igor Omelchenko (born 12 February 1960) is a Georgian former backstroke swimmer. He competed in three events at the 1976 Summer Olympics representing the Soviet Union.
