= Milton Braga =

Brazilian diver

Personal information
- Born: 16 February 1954 (age 71); Rio de Janeiro, Brazil

Sport
- Sport: Diving

Milton Braga (born 16 February 1954) is a Brazilian diver. He competed at the 1976 Summer Olympics and the 1980 Summer Olympics.
