= Athos Pisoni =

Brazilian sports shooter (born 1937)

Personal information
- Born: 3 March 1937 São Paulo, Brazil
- Died: 9 February 2025 (aged 87) Americana, São Paulo, Brazil

Sport
- Sport: Sports shooting
Medal record
Representing Brazil
Pan American Games
Gold medal – first place	1975 Mexico City	Skeet
Silver medal – second place	1975 Mexico City	Skeet team
Bronze medal – third place	1975 Mexico City	Trap team

Athos Pisoni (3 March 1937 – 9 February 2025) was a Brazilian sports shooter. He competed in the mixed skeet event at the 1976 Summer Olympics.

Pisoni died from cancer in Americana, on 9 February 2025, at the age of 87.
