= Steve Hardy (swimmer) =

Canadian swimmer (1957–2025)

Personal information
- Full name: Stephen Kenneth Hardy
- Nationality: Canadian
- Born: 6 October 1957 Vancouver, British Columbia, Canada
- Died: 27 February 2025 (aged 67) Merritt, British Columbia, Canada
- Spouse: Kim Leclair (Divorced 2025)

Sport
- Sport: Swimming
Medal record
Representing Canada
Pan American Games
Silver medal – second place	1975 Mexico City	4x100m freestyle relay
Silver medal – second place	1975 Mexico City	4x200m freestyle relay

Steve Hardy (6 October 1957 – 27 February 2025) was a Canadian swimmer. He competed in two backstroke events at the 1976 Summer Olympics. He died on 27 February 2025 in Merritt, British Columbia after a long battle with cancer.
