= Elói de Oliveira =

Brazilian volleyball player (born 1957)

Personal information
- Nationality: Brazilian
- Born: 22 February 1957 (age 68)

Sport
- Sport: Volleyball

Elói de Oliveira (born 22 February 1957) is a Brazilian former volleyball player. He competed in the men's tournament at the 1976 Summer Olympics.
