= Waldemar Capucci =

Brazilian sports shooter (1929–2014)

Personal information
- Born: 8 June 1929; São Paulo, Brazil
- Died: 15 September 2014 (aged 85); São Paulo, Brazil

Sport
- Sport: Sports shooting

Waldemar Capucci (8 June 1929 – 15 September 2014) was a Brazilian sports shooter. He competed at the 1976 Summer Olympics, the 1980 Summer Olympics and the 1984 Summer Olympics.
