= Bobby Hackett (swimmer) =

American swimmer (born 1959)

Personal information
- Full name: Robert William Hackett, Jr.
- Nickname: "Bobby"
- National team: United States
- Born: August 15, 1959 (age 66) Yonkers, New York
- Height: 6 ft 2 in (1.88 m)
- Weight: 183 lb (83 kg)

Sport
- Sport: Swimming
- Strokes: Freestyle
- Club: Bernal's Gator Swim Club
- College team: Harvard University
Medal record
Men's swimming
Representing the United States
Olympic Games
Silver medal – second place	1976 Montreal	1500 m freestyle
World Championships – Long course
Gold medal – first place	1978 West Berlin	4×200 m freestyle
Bronze medal – third place	1978 West Berlin	1500 m freestyle
Pan American Games
Gold medal – first place	1975 Mexico City	1500 m freestyle
Silver medal – second place	1975 Mexico City	400 m freestyle
Bronze medal – third place	1979 San Juan	1500 m freestyle

Robert William Hackett, Jr. (born August 15, 1959) is an American former competition swimmer, Olympic medalist, and former world record-holder. He represented the United States at the 1976 Summer Olympics in Montreal, Quebec as a 16-year-old, where he won a silver medal in the men's 1500-meter freestyle, finishing behind U.S. teammate Brian Goodell.

He was trained by coach Joe Bernal. Bernal, the former head coach of Bernal's Gator Swim Club in Boston, Massachusetts, was known to have given Hackett 100 x 100 yard sets on the 1:00 interval. Hackett still holds one of the oldest National Age Group records, a 15:03.91 in the 1,500-meter freestyle (long-course meters). He set the record by shattering the previous record at the 1976 Olympics.

As of 2012, Hackett was living and working in the New York metro area, near where he grew up. He has made a living in commercial real estate and is volunteer coaching with the Boys and Girls Club of Northern Westchester Marlins. He earned an MBA from Harvard Business School in 1986. Hackett now coaches part-time for Emory University's swimming and diving team.

== See also ==
- List of Harvard University people
- List of Olympic medalists in swimming (men)
- List of World Aquatics Championships medalists in swimming (men)
- World record progression 800 metres freestyle
- World record progression 4 × 200 metres freestyle relay

Records
Preceded by Stephen Holland	Men's 800-meter freestyle world record-holder (long course); June 21, 1976 – March 23, 1979	Succeeded by Vladimir Salnikov
