= Mike Scarth =

Canadian swimmer

Personal information
- Born: 4 March 1959 (age 67) Edmonton, Alberta, Canada

Sport
- Sport: Swimming
Medal record
Representing Canada
Pan American Games
Silver medal – second place	1975 Mexico City	200m backstroke
Silver medal – second place	1975 Mexico City	4x100m medley relay

Mike Scarth (born 4 March 1959) is a Canadian former swimmer. He competed in two events at the 1976 Summer Olympics.
