= Mike Whitaker (swimmer) =

Canadian swimmer

Personal information
- Born: 8 November 1951 (age 74) Edmonton, Alberta, Canada

Sport
- Sport: Swimming

Mike Whitaker (born 8 November 1951) is a Canadian former breaststroke swimmer. He competed in two events at the 1972 Summer Olympics.
