= Sérgio Danilas =

Brazilian volleyball player (born 1952)

Personal information
- Nationality: Brazilian
- Born: 30 May 1952 (age 73)

Sport
- Sport: Volleyball

Sérgio Danilas (born 30 May 1952) is a Brazilian volleyball player. He competed in the men's tournament at the 1976 Summer Olympics.
