= Romeu Luchiari Filho =

Brazilian sports shooter (born 1953)

Personal information
- Nationality: Brazilian
- Born: 5 August 1953 (age 71); Americana, Brazil

Sport
- Sport: Sports shooting

Romeu Luchiari Filho (born 5 August 1953) is a Brazilian sports shooter. He competed in the mixed skeet event at the 1976 Summer Olympics.
