= Paulo Peterle =

Brazilian volleyball player (born 1949)

Personal information
- Born: 21 February 1949 (age 76); Rio de Janeiro, Brazil

Sport
- Sport: Volleyball

Paulo Peterle (born 21 February 1949) is a Brazilian volleyball player. He competed at the 1968 Summer Olympics and the 1976 Summer Olympics.
