= Jean Luc Rosat =

Brazilian volleyball player (1953–2021)

Personal information
- Nationality: Brazilian
- Born: 6 September 1953 Montevideo, Uruguay
- Died: 2 April 2021 (aged 67) Rio de Janeiro, Brazil

Sport
- Sport: Volleyball
Medal record
Men's volleyball
Representing Brazil
Pan American Games
Silver medal – second place	1975 Mexico	Team

Jean Luc Rosat (6 September 1953 – 2 April 2021) was a Brazilian volleyball player. He competed at the 1976 Summer Olympics and the 1980 Summer Olympics.

Rosat died at age 67 due to complications from COVID-19.
