= Arnaldo Pérez =

Puerto Rican swimmer (born 1958)

Personal information
- Born: October 28, 1958 (age 67)
Medal record
Men's swimming
Representing Puerto Rico
Pan American Games
Bronze medal – third place	1979 San Juan	4x100m Medley

Arnaldo Pérez (born October 28, 1958) is a former butterfly and freestyle swimmer from Puerto Rico. He competed for his native country at the 1976 Summer Olympics in Montréal, Quebec, Canada, aged seventeen.

Two years later, Pérez won the bronze medal in the Men's 4 × 100 m Medley Relay at the 1979 Pan American Games, alongside Orlando Catinchi, Carlos Berrocal, and Fernando Cañales.
