= Paulo de Sene =

Brazilian weightlifter (born 1948)

Personal information
- Born: 22 May 1948 (age 77); Jundiaí, Brazil

Sport
- Sport: Weightlifting

Paulo de Sene (born 22 May 1948) is a Brazilian weightlifter. He competed at the 1976 Summer Olympics and the 1980 Summer Olympics.
