= Flávia Nadalutti =

Brazilian swimmer (born 1961)

Personal information
- Full name: Flávia Nadalutti
- Born: March 18, 1961 (age 65) Rio de Janeiro, Rio de Janeiro, Brazil
- Height: 1.66 m (5 ft 5 in)
- Weight: 56 kg (123 lb)

Sport
- Sport: Swimming
- Strokes: Butterfly, Medley
Medal record
Women's swimming
Representing Brazil
Pan American Games
Bronze medal – third place	1975 Mexico City	4x100m medley

Flávia Nadalutti (born March 18, 1961, in Rio de Janeiro) is a former international butterfly and medley swimmer from Brazil, who participated in a Summer Olympics for her native country.

She was at the 1975 World Aquatics Championships in Cali. She swam in the 4×100-metre medley, where the Brazil's relay, composed by Christiane Paquelet, Flávia Nadalutti, Lucy Burle and Cristina Teixeira, finished 12th with a time of 4:38.75. In the 200-metre butterfly, she finished with a time of 2:28.53, far from her personal best at this moment, the South American record (2:20.10), not going to the finals.

She was at the 1975 Pan American Games, in Mexico City, where she won a bronze medal in the 4×100-metre medley. She also finished 5th in the 200-metre individual medley, 5th in the 200-metre butterfly, 5th in the 400-metre individual medley, and 7th in the 100-metre butterfly.

At the 1976 Summer Olympics, in Montreal, she swam the 100-metre butterfly, not reaching the final.

Participated at the 1978 World Aquatics Championships in West Berlin, where she finished 11th in the 400-metre individual medley (breaking the Brazilian record), and 19th in the 200-metre individual medley.

After ending her career in swimming, she became an architect. In 2010, she was adviser to the CBDA for the design application of Rio de Janeiro become the headquarters of the 2015 World Aquatics Championships.
