= Wade Flemons (swimmer) =

Canadian swimmer (born 1960)

Personal information
- Born: Wade Flemons; August 26, 1960 (age 65)

Sport
- Country: Canada
- Sport: Swimming
- Event: Backstroke
Medal record
Commonwealth Games
| Bronze medal – third place | 1982 Brisbane | 100 m backstroke |

Wade Flemons (born August 26, 1960) is a Canadian former backstroke swimmer.

Flemons trained at the Hollyburn Country Club while growing up in Vancouver, British Columbia.

A backstroke specialist, Flemons swam at two World Championships and qualified for the 1980 Moscow Olympics, which Canada ultimately boycotted. Swimming in the 100 metre backstroke, he came sixth at the 1979 Pan American Games, won bronze at 1982 Commonwealth Games and was fourth at the 1983 Pan American Games. He was a collegiate swimmer for Stanford University and won an NCAA Division I championship in the 200 yard backstroke.
