= Cristina Teixeira =

Brazilian swimmer

Personal information
- Full name: Cristina Bassani Teixeira
- Born: June 25, 1958 (age 68) Rio de Janeiro, Rio de Janeiro, Brazil
- Height: 1.68 m (5 ft 6 in)
- Weight: 56 kg (123 lb)

Sport
- Sport: Swimming
- Strokes: Breaststroke
Medal record
Women's swimming
Representing Brazil
Pan American Games
Bronze medal – third place	1975 Mexico City	4x100m medley

Cristina Bassani Teixeira (born June 25, 1958 in Rio de Janeiro) is a former international breaststroke swimmer from Brazil, who competed at two consecutive Summer Olympics for her native country, starting in 1972.

She was at the 1971 Pan American Games, in Cali, where she finished 5th in the 100-metre breaststroke, and 7th in the 200-metre breaststroke.

At the 1972 Summer Olympics, in Munich, she swam the 100-metre and 200-metre breaststroke, not reaching the finals.

Participated at the inaugural World Aquatics Championships in 1973 Belgrade, where she finished 16th in the 100-metre breaststroke and in the 200-metre breaststroke. She also finished 12th the 4×100-metre medley, along with Valéria Borges, Jaqueline Mross and Lucy Burle.

She was at the 1975 World Aquatics Championships in Cali. She swam in the 4×100-metre medley, where the Brazil's relay, composed by Christiane Paquelet, Flávia Nadalutti, Lucy Burle and Cristina Teixeira, finished 12th with a time of 4:38.75. In the 200-metre breaststroke, she finished 16th, with a time of 2:47.58, nearly breaking her South American record (2:47.44).

She was at the 1975 Pan American Games, in Mexico City, where she won a bronze medal in the 4×100-metre medley. She also finished 5th in the 100-metre breaststroke and 5th in the 200-metre breaststroke.

At the 1976 Summer Olympics, in Montreal, she swam the 100-metre and 200-metre breaststroke, not reaching the finals.
