= Conrado Porta =

Argentine swimmer

Personal information
- Born: 20 June 1958 (age 68)

Sport
- Sport: Swimming

Conrado Porta (born 20 June 1958) is an Argentine former swimmer. He competed in two events at the 1976 Summer Olympics.
