= Peter Rocca =

American swimmer (born 1957)

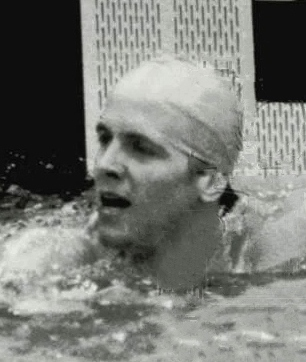
- Rocca at the 1976 Olympics

Personal information
- Full name: Peter Drake Rocca
- National team: United States
- Born: July 27, 1957 (age 68) Oakland, California, U.S.
- Height: 6 ft 3 in (1.91 m)
- Weight: 176 lb (80 kg)

Sport
- Sport: Swimming
- Strokes: Backstroke
- Club: Concord Swim Club
- College team: University of California, Berkeley
- Coach: Nort Thornton Jr. (U. California)
Medal record
Men's swimming
Representing the United States
Olympic Games
| Gold medal – first place | 1976 Montreal | 4x100 m medley relay |
| Silver medal – second place | 1976 Montreal | 100 m backstroke |
| Silver medal – second place | 1976 Montreal | 200 m backstroke |
World Championships (LC)
| Silver medal – second place | 1978 Berlin | 100 m backstroke |
Pan American Games
| Gold medal – first place | 1975 Mexico City | 100 m backstroke |
| Gold medal – first place | 1975 Mexico City | 4x100 m medley relay |
| Gold medal – first place | 1979 San Juan | 200 m backstroke |

Peter Drake Rocca (born July 27, 1957) is an American former competition swimmer, Olympic medalist, and former world record-holder.

Rocca broke onto the international swimming scene winning two gold medals in the men's backstroke events (100-meter backstroke, 4×100-meter medley relay) at the 1975 Pan American Games in Mexico City. Peter participated at the 1976 Summer Olympics in Montreal, Quebec, where he claimed two silver medals in the men's backstroke events (100 and 200-meter), and a gold medal swimming in the preliminaries of the men's 4 x 100 Medley relay. Rocca continued to swim after the Montreal Olympics—two years later he won the silver medal in the men's 100-meter backstroke event at the 1978 World Aquatics Championships in Berlin, Germany. He represented the United States again at the 1979 Pan American Games in San Juan, Puerto Rico, winning the 200-meter backstroke. In 1980, Rocca qualified for the Olympic team in both the 100-meter and 200-meter backstroke events and was elected team captain, only to have his culminating performances dashed by the United States-led boycott of the 1980 Summer Olympics in Moscow.

Rocca attended the University of California, Berkeley, competing for the California Golden Bears swimming and diving team under Hall of Fame Coach Nort Thornton., and was a member of the Kappa Delta Rho fraternity. He was one of the top backstrokers in the world from 1975 through 1980, and competed in the eras of Roland Matthes and John Naber, finishing second to Naber in both backstroke events at the 1976 Olympics and beating Mathes in the 100-meter. In college competition, Rocca led a resurgence of the Golden Bears men's swim program, captaining and winning individual and the team titles his senior year in 1979. Additionally, he won seven USS titles; five individual and two relays.

At the age of 27, and after three years out of the water, Rocca made an Olympic comeback effort in 1984. At the 1984 U.S. Olympic Trials, he fell short of qualifying for the 1984 U.S. team, finishing fourth in the 200-meter and third in the 100-meter backstroke races.

== See also ==
- List of Olympic medalists in swimming (men)
- List of World Aquatics Championships medalists in swimming (men)
- World record progression 4 × 100 metres medley relay
