= Lucy Burle =

Brazilian swimmer (born 1955)

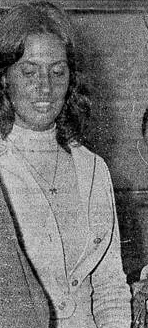

Personal information
- Full name: Lucy Maurity Burle
- Born: February 21, 1955 (age 71) Rio de Janeiro, Rio de Janeiro, Brazil
- Height: 1.72 m (5 ft 8 in)
- Weight: 63 kg (139 lb)

Sport
- Sport: Swimming
- Strokes: Freestyle, Butterfly
Medal record
Women's swimming
Representing Brazil
Pan American Games
Bronze medal – third place	1971 Cali	100m butterfly
Bronze medal – third place	1971 Cali	4x100m free
Bronze medal – third place	1975 Mexico City	4x100m free
Bronze medal – third place	1975 Mexico City	4x100m medley

Lucy Maurity Burle (born February 21, 1955, in Rio de Janeiro) is a former international freestyle and butterfly swimmer from Brazil, who competed at one Summer Olympics for her native country.

She was at the 1971 Pan American Games, in Cali, where she won two bronze medals, in the 100-metre butterfly (breaking the South American record), and in the 4×100-metre freestyle. She also finished 4th in the 100-metre freestyle; 5th in the 200-metre freestyle, breaking the Brazilian record; and 5th in the 4×100-metre medley.

At the 1972 Summer Olympics, in Munich, she swam the 100-metre and 200-metre freestyle, not reaching the finals.

Participated at the inaugural World Aquatics Championships in 1973 Belgrade, where she finished 13th in the 100-metre freestyle, and 18th in the 200-metre freestyle. She also finished 12th the 4×100-metre medley, along with Valéria Borges, Jaqueline Mross and Cristina Teixeira.

Between 1972 and 1974, she broke three times the South American record in the 100-metre freestyle.

She was at the 1975 World Aquatics Championships in Cali. She swam in the 4×100-metre medley, where the Brazil's relay, composed by Christiane Paquelet, Flávia Nadalutti, Lucy Burle and Cristina Teixeira, finished 12th with a time of 4:38.75. In the 100-metre freestyle, she finished 19th, with a time of 1:01.72.

She was at the 1975 Pan American Games, in Mexico City, where she won two bronze medals in the 4×100-metre freestyle and 4×100-metre medley. She also finished 7th in the 100-metre freestyle.
