= José Namorado =

Brazilian swimmer (born 1952)

Personal information
- Full name: José Luciano Nava Namorado
- Nationality: Brazil
- Born: 23 May 1952 (age 74) Portugal

Sport
- Sport: Swimming
- Strokes: Freestyle
Medal record
Men's swimming
Representing Brazil
Pan American Games
Bronze medal – third place	1975 Mexico City	4x200m freestyle
Bronze medal – third place	1975 Mexico City	4x100m medley
Universiade
Bronze medal – third place	1973 Moscow	400m freestyle
Bronze medal – third place	1973 Moscow	4x200m freestyle

José Luciano Nava Namorado (born 23 May 1952) was an international freestyle swimmer from Brazil. Born in Portugal, he became a naturalized Brazilian.

Participated at the inaugural World Aquatics Championships in 1973 Belgrade, where he finished 5th in the 4×100-metre freestyle, along with Ruy de Oliveira, José Aranha and James Huxley Adams, and 13th in the 200-metre freestyle. In the 400-metre freestyle, he did 4:14.37, not going to the finals. He also swam the 4×200-metre freestyle, finishing 11th, with the same team.

At the 1973 Summer Universiade, in Moscow, Namorado won a bronze medal in the 400-metre freestyle, with a time of 4:12.74, and in the 4×200-metre freestyle, along with José Aranha, James Huxley Adams and Alfredo Machado.

He was at the 1975 Pan American Games, in Mexico City. He won the bronze medal in the 4×200-metre freestyle and 4×100-metre medley. He also finished 8th in the 100-metre freestyle.

Namorado is a former South American record holder of the 200-metre freestyle. In 1973, he also broke two times the South American record in the 400-metre freestyle.

He died in the 70s.
