= Carlos Berrocal =

Puerto Rican swimmer (born 1957)

Personal information
- Born: May 18, 1957 (age 69) Mayagüez, Puerto Rico
Medal record
Men's swimming
Representing Puerto Rico
Pan American Games
Bronze medal – third place	1979 San Juan	4x100m MedleyNCAA champion for the University of Alabama 100 yard backstroke

Carlos Berrocal (born May 18, 1957) is a former backstroke and freestyle swimmer from Puerto Rico. He competed for his native country at the 1976 Summer Olympics in Montréal, Quebec, Canada.

Two years later Berrocal won the bronze medal in the Men's 4 × 100 m Medley Relay at the 1979 Pan American Games, alongside Orlando Catinchi, Arnaldo Pérez, and Fernando Cañales. He was one of the Torch Lighters at the 2010 Central American and Caribbean Games. The Natatorio RUM now bears his name. He joined Zeta Mu Gamma fraternity in 1972.
