= Paul Jouanneau =

Brazilian swimmer (born 1959)

Personal information
- Full name: Paul Henry Michel Jouanneau
- Born: 17 March 1959 (age 67) Brazil

Sport
- Sport: Swimming
- Strokes: Freestyle, Backstroke
Medal record
Men's swimming
Representing Brazil
Pan American Games
Bronze medal – third place	1975 Mexico City	4x200m freestyle

Paul Henry Michel Jouanneau (born 17 March 1959) is a former international freestyle swimmer from Brazil.

== International career ==
Participated at the inaugural World Aquatics Championships in 1973 Belgrade, where he competed in the 400-metre freestyle. He did a time of 4:18.19, not going to the finals.

In 1974, he broke the South American record in the 400-metre freestyle, with a time of 4:11.19.

He was at the 1975 World Aquatics Championships in Cali. In the 200-metre freestyle, he finished 21st, with a time of 2:02.33, far from his personal best at this moment, 1:58.60. In the 4×200-metre freestyle, he finished 12th, with a time of 8:07.41, along with Paulo Zanetti, Eduardo Alijó Neto and Paulo Mangini. In the 100-metre freestyle, he finished 22nd, with a time of 56.24 seconds.

He was at the 1975 Pan American Games, in Mexico City. He won the bronze medal in the 4×200-metre freestyle. He also finished 7th in the 400-metre freestyle.

At the 1976 Summer Olympics, in Montreal, he swam the 100-metre freestyle and the 100-metre backstroke, not reaching the finals.
