= Rosemary Ribeiro =

Brazilian swimmer (born 1958)

Personal information
- Full name: Rosemary Peres Ribeiro
- Born: March 17, 1958 (age 68) Brazil
- Height: 1.65 m (5 ft 5 in)
- Weight: 57 kg (126 lb)

Sport
- Sport: Swimming
- Strokes: Butterfly
Medal record
Women's swimming
Representing Brazil
Pan American Games
Bronze medal – third place	1971 Cali	4x100m free
Bronze medal – third place	1975 Mexico City	200m butterfly
Bronze medal – third place	1975 Mexico City	4x100m free

Rosemary Peres Ribeiro (born March 17, 1958) is a former international butterfly swimmer from Brazil, who participated in a Summer Olympics for her native country.

At 13 years old, in the 1971 Pan American Games, in Cali, she won a bronze medal in the 4×100-metre freestyle. She also finished 5th in the 200-metre individual medley.

Participated at the inaugural World Aquatics Championships in 1973 Belgrade, where she finished 18th in the 100-metre butterfly.

In 1974, she broke the South American record in the 100-metre freestyle, with a time of 1:00.4.

She was at the 1975 World Aquatics Championships in Cali. In the 200-metre butterfly, she finished with a time of 2:23.24, near from her personal best at this moment, 2:22.06, but not going to the finals. In the 100-metre freestyle, she finished 20th, with a time of 1:01.91.

She was at the 1975 Pan American Games, in Mexico City, where she won two bronze medals, in the 200-metre butterfly, and in the 4×100-metre freestyle. She also finished 6th in the 100-metre butterfly, and 6th in the 100-metre freestyle.

At the 1976 Summer Olympics, in Montreal, she swam the 100-metre and 200-metre butterfly, not reaching the finals.

She was at the 1983 Pan American Games, in Caracas, where she finished 8th in the 100-metre butterfly.
