= José Fiolo =

Brazilian swimmer (born 1950)

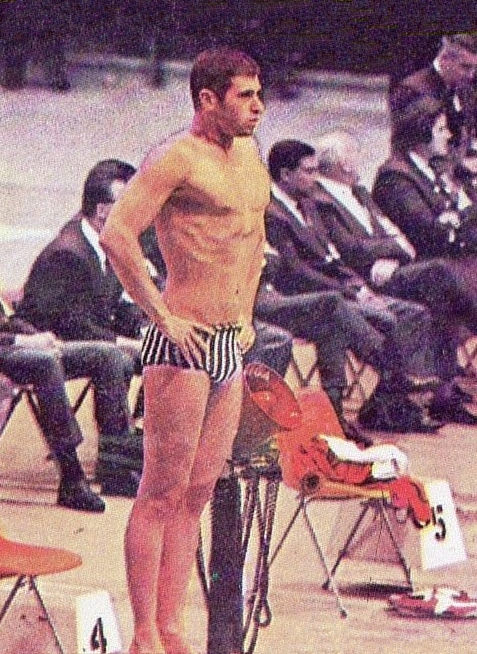
- José Fiolo c. 1972

Personal information
- Full name: José Sylvio Fiolo
- Born: March 2, 1950 (age 76) Campinas, São Paulo, Brazil
- Height: 1.79 m (5 ft 10 in)
- Weight: 77 kg (170 lb)

Sport
- Sport: Swimming
- Strokes: Breaststroke
Medal record
Representing Brazil
Pan American Games
| Gold medal – first place | 1967 Winnipeg | 100 m breaststroke |
| Gold medal – first place | 1967 Winnipeg | 200 m breaststroke |
| Bronze medal – third place | 1967 Winnipeg | 4×100 m medley |
| Bronze medal – third place | 1971 Cali | 100 m breaststroke |
| Bronze medal – third place | 1971 Cali | 4×100 m medley |
| Bronze medal – third place | 1975 Mexico City | 100 m breaststroke |
| Bronze medal – third place | 1975 Mexico City | 4×100 m medley |

José Sylvio Fiolo (born March 2, 1950, in Campinas) is a former international breaststroke swimmer from Brazil.

Fiolo participated for his native country at three consecutive Summer Olympics: 1968 Mexico City, 1972 Munich and 1976 Montreal. In 1968, he obtained the 4th place in the 100-metre breaststroke; also participated in the 200-metre breaststroke and 4×100-metre medley, not going to the finals. In 1972, he was 6th in the 100-metre breaststroke, and along the Brazilian relay, ranked 5th in the 4×100-metre medley. Also attended the 200 meter breaststroke, not going to the finals. In 1976, participated in the 100-metre breaststroke, not going to the finals.

His greatest achievement occurred on February 19, 1968, at age 17, when, alone in the pool but in front of a crowd in the stands of the Clube de Regatas Guanabara, in Rio de Janeiro – the same place and the same way as Manuel dos Santos broke seven years before the world record of 100-metre freestyle – he established the World Record for the 100-metre breaststroke race, with a time of 1:06.4.

Fiolo also holds seven medals in Pan American Games.

At the 1967 Pan American Games in Winnipeg, Fiolo won two gold medals in the 100-metre and 200-metre breaststroke events, and a bronze medal in the 4×100-metre medley.

At the 1971 Pan American Games in Cali, Fiolo won two bronze medals in the 100-metre breaststroke and 4×100-metre medley events. He also finished 5th in the 200-metre breaststroke. In the 4×100-metre medley, he broke the South American record, with a time of 4:02.94.

At the 1975 Pan American Games in Mexico City, Fiolo won two bronze medals in the 100-metre breaststroke and 4×100-metre medley events. He also finished 6th in the 200-metre breaststroke.

He's been living in Australia for more than 20 years. His son, Pietro Figlioli, was player of water polo of the Australian team, and now, by the Italian team.

Records
| Preceded by (Soviet Union) Vladimir Kosinski | Men's 100-metre breaststroke world record holder (long course); February 19, 1968 – April 18, 1968 | Succeeded by (Soviet Union) Nikolai Pankin |
