= Rômulo Arantes =

Brazilian swimmer and actor

Personal information
- Born: June 12, 1957 Rio de Janeiro, Brazil
- Died: June 10, 2000 (aged 42) Maripá de Minas, Brazil
- Height: 1.85 m (6 ft 1 in)
- Weight: 75 kg (165 lb)

Sport
- Sport: Swimming
- Club: Clube de Regatas do Flamengo; Indiana Hoosiers
Medal record
Representing Brazil
World Championships
| Bronze medal – third place | 1978 West Berlin | 100 m backstroke |
Pan American Games
| Silver medal – second place | 1979 San Juan | 100 m backstroke |
| Bronze medal – third place | 1975 Mexico City | 100 m backstroke |
| Bronze medal – third place | 1975 Mexico City | 4x100 m medley |
| Bronze medal – third place | 1975 Mexico City | 4x200 m freestyle |
| Bronze medal – third place | 1979 San Juan | 4×100 m free |
Universiade
| Gold medal – first place | 1977 Sofia | 100 m backstroke |
| Silver medal – second place | 1979 Mexico City | 100 m backstroke |
| Bronze medal – third place | 1981 Bucharest | 100 m backstroke |
| Bronze medal – third place | 1981 Bucharest | 4x100 m medley |

Rômulo Duncan Arantes Filho (usually Rômulo Arantes; June 12, 1957 – June 10, 2000) was a Brazilian swimmer and an actor. He won a bronze medal in the 100-metre backstroke at the 1978 World Aquatics Championships and four medals at the Universiades (1977 and 1981) and Pan American Games (1979). He also competed in eight events at the 1972, 1976 and 1980 Summer Olympics with the best achievement of fifth place in the 4×100-metre medley relay in 1972.

He participated at the inaugural World Aquatics Championships in 1973 Belgrade, where he finished 7th in the 100-metre backstroke, breaking the South American record, with a time of 1:00.37. In the 200-metre backstroke, he not qualified for the final, but also broke the South American record, with a time of 2:12.98.

He competed in the 1975 World Aquatics Championships in Cali. In the 100-metre backstroke, he finished 10th, with a time of 1:00.30, far from his personal best at this moment, the South American record (58.61 seconds). In the 4×100-metre medley, he finished 9th, with a time of 4:01.99, along with Sérgio Pinto Ribeiro, Heliani dos Santos and Ruy de Oliveira. Arantes had contracted a virus that made him stop training for a month, which affected his results negatively in this World Championships.

He was at the 1975 Pan American Games, in Mexico City. He won the bronze medal in the 100-metre backstroke, 4×100-metre medley and 4×200-metre freestyle. He also finished 4th in the 200-metre backstroke.

At the 1977 Summer Universiade, held in Sofia, Arantes won a gold medal in the 100-metre backstroke. At the 1979 Summer Universiade, held in Mexico City, Arantes won a silver medal in the 100-metre backstroke. At the 1981 Summer Universiade, held in Bucharest, Arantes won two bronze medals in the 100-metre backstroke and in the 4×100-metre medley relay.

Around 1977–1981, he studied business administration and trained at Indiana University Bloomington, and graduated with a bachelor's degree in 1981. After retiring from swimming in the early 1980s, he became a notable national film and TV actor, and sang in a band.

== Family and death ==
He was a son of Rômulo Duncan Arantes, thus his full name literally means Rômulo Duncan Arantes, Jr. (Portuguese: filho = son). In the 1990s, Arantes became an amateur pilot and even built a landing strip at his farm near Maripá de Minas. Two days before his 43 birthday, while his family was preparing for celebrations at the farm, he flew an ultralight plane Ultravia Pelican with 24-year-old friend Fábio Amorim Ribeiro Ruivo. Minutes after take-off, the plane crashed, just some 500 meters from the runway, instantly killing both men.

His widow Valéria Braga (b. 1955) is a businesswoman. His son Rômulo Neto (b. 1987) and daughter Cloé Schmidt Arantes are also actors and models.
