= Swimming at the 1952 Summer Olympics – Men's 100 metre backstroke =

Men's 100 metre backstroke at the Games of the XV Olympiad
- Venue: Helsinki Swimming Stadium
- Date: 30 July 1952 (heats); 31 July 1952 (semifinals); 1 August 1952 (final)
- Competitors: 38 from 25 nations
- Winning time: 1:05.4 OR

Medalists
1st place, gold medalist(s)		Yoshi Oyakawa	United States
2nd place, silver medalist(s)		Gilbert Bozon	France
3rd place, bronze medalist(s)		Jack Taylor	United States

The men's 100 metre backstroke event at the 1952 Olympic Games took place between 30 July and 1 August, at the Swimming Stadium. This swimming event used the backstroke. Because an Olympic size swimming pool is 50 metres long, this race consisted of two lengths of the pool.

== Results ==
=== Heats ===
Heat 1

Rank	Athlete	Country	Time	Note
1	Gilbert Bozon	France	1:07.8	
2	Allen Stack	United States	1:08.9	
3	Bert Wardrop	Great Britain	1:09.9	
4	Norihiko Kurahashi	Japan	1:10.7	
5	Vladimir Lopatin	Soviet Union	1:10.8	
6	Lucien Beaumont	Canada	1:14.2	
7	Khamlillal Shah	India	1:18.3	

Heat 2

Rank	Athlete	Country	Time	Note
1	Pedro Galvão	Argentina	1:08.1	
2	Yasumasa Nishino	Japan	1:10.1	
3	Clemente Mejía	Mexico	1:10.7	
4	Helmut Koppelstätter	Austria	1:11.9	
5	Hermann Gericke	Switzerland	1:12.6	
6	Jerzy Boniecki	Poland	1:13.4	
7	Eurico Surgey	Portugal	1:13.7	

Heat 3

Rank	Athlete	Country	Time	Note
1	Jack Taylor	United States	1:07.2	
2	Boris Škanata	Yugoslavia	1:07.5	
3	João Gonçalves Filho	Brazil	1:09.7	
4	Ladislav Bačík	Czechoslovakia	1:10.2	
5	Imre Nyéki	Hungary	1:10.6	
6	Peter Salmon	Canada	1:13.8	
7	Tom Pettersen	Norway	1:15.4	

Heat 4

Rank	Athlete	Country	Time	Note
1	Yoshi Oyakawa	United States	1:06.0	
2	Lin Meiring	South Africa	1:08.5	
3	Fernando Pavan	Brazil	1:09.1	
4	Jitse van der Veen	Netherlands	1:09.1	
5	Bijoy Barman	India	1:27.3	

Heat 5

Rank	Athlete	Country	Time	Note
1	John Brockway	Great Britain	1:08.8	
2	Lucien Zins	France	1:09.7	
3	Ilo da Fonseca	Brazil	1:09.9	
4	Leonid Sagayduk	Soviet Union	1:11.4	
5	Wu Chuanyu	China	1:12.3	
6	Eduardo Barbeiro	Portugal	1:13.0	

Heat 6

Rank	Athlete	Country	Time	Note
1	Egidio Massaria	Italy	1:08.8	
2	Viktor Solovyov	Soviet Union	1:09.5	
3	Lincoln Hurring	New Zealand	1:09.6	
4	László Gyöngyösi	Hungary	1:10.0	
5	Frank O'Neill	Australia	1:10.5	
6	Erkki Marttinen	Finland	1:15.2	

Tie-breaker

Rank	Athlete	Country	Time	Note
1	Bert Wardrop	Great Britain	1:07.8	
2	Ilo da Fonseca	Brazil	1:09.5	

=== Final ===
Rank	Athlete	Country	Time	Notes
1	Yoshi Oyakawa	United States	1:05.4	OR
2	Gilbert Bozon	France	1:06.2	
3	Jack Taylor	United States	1:06.4	
4	Allen Stack	United States	1:07.6	
5	Pedro Galvão	Argentina	1:07.7	
6	Bert Wardrop	Great Britain	1:07.8	
7	Boris Škanata	Yugoslavia	1:08.1	
8	Lin Meiring	South Africa	1:08.3	

Key: OR = Olympic record
