= Street hockey =

Variant of other hockey sports

Street Hockey
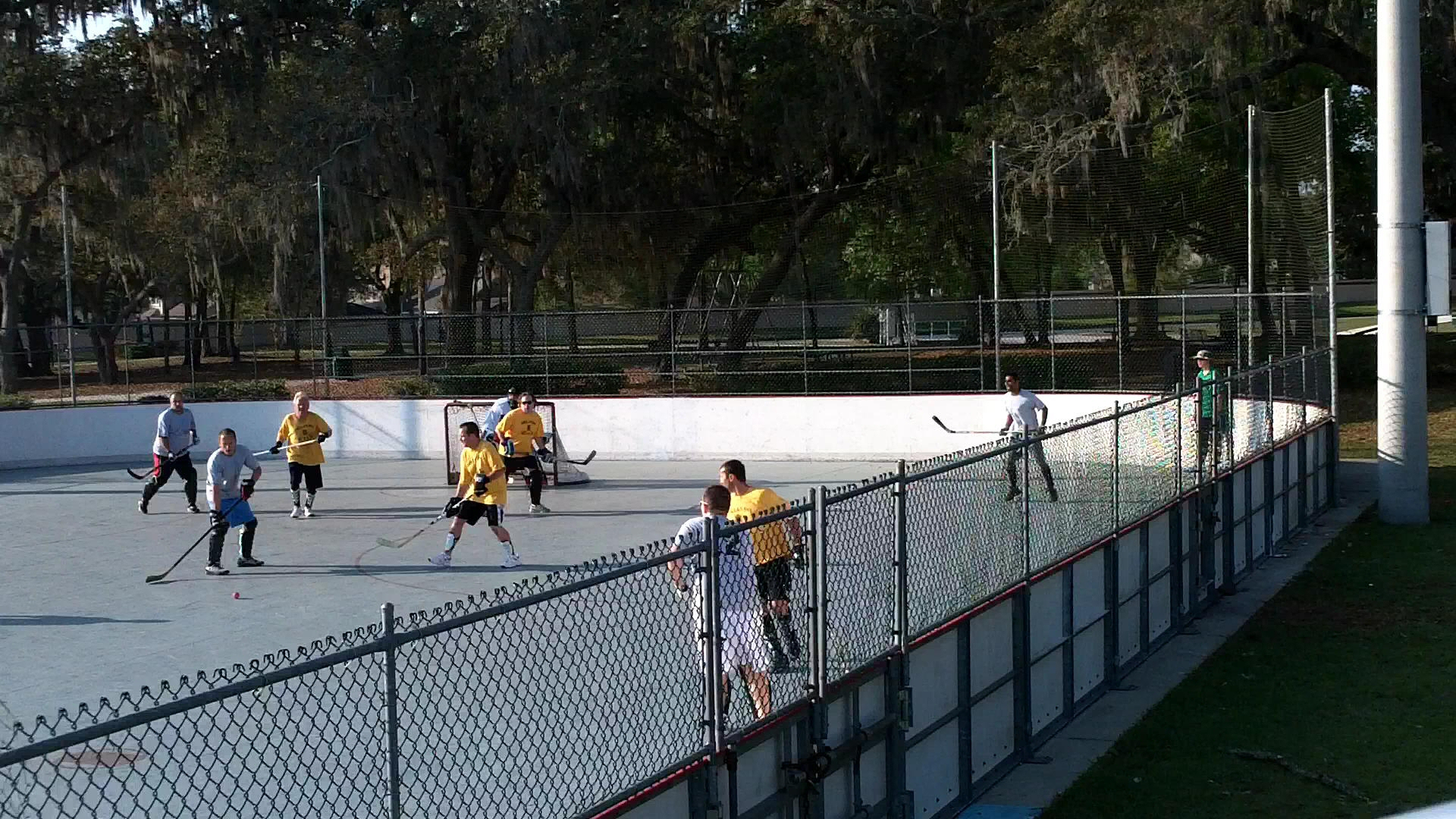
- People playing street hockey in an outdoor enclosure (outdoor rink).
- Highest governing body: International Street and Ball Hockey Federation (International) Canadian Ball Hockey Association (Canada)
- Nicknames: ball hockey (worldwide); dek hockey (United States, Quebec); road hockey (Canada); shinny (Canada)

Characteristics
- Type: Outdoor games * indoor games are more commonly floor hockey variants
- Equipment: Required: ball or a puck; a hockey stick; 2 goal nets; Optional: shin pads; gloves; helmet

Street hockey (also known as shinny, dek hockey, ball hockey, road hockey or street roller hockey) is a collection of team sport variants played outdoors either on foot or with wheeled skates (either quad or in-line), using either a ball or puck designed for play on flat, dry surfaces. The object of every game is to score more goals than the opposing team by shooting the ball or puck into the opposing team's net. All games are derivatives of either the sport of ice hockey, floor hockey, bandy, and/or field hockey.

Wheeled variants involve the use of inline or roller skates. and variously qualify as either inline hockey or rink hockey (also known as "Quad hockey").

Street hockey in "pickup" form is generally played under the following guidelines since there are no "official rules" for local pickup hockey:

- Physical contact between players is extremely limited to avoid injury.
- Minimal or no hockey equipment is worn by the runners, depending on players' preferences.
- Players agree whether or not to allow slap shots and raising of the stick, both of which can incur serious injury to players, as there is minimal or no equipment worn.
- Players determine whether to use a hockey ball, a tennis ball, or a street hockey puck.
- There is no referee except when agreed upon by both teams.

Street hockey is commonly played on an outdoor surface (often a street, parking lot, tennis court, or other asphalt surface), which the genesis of the name street hockey. Teams are selected by various methods but usually are selected by captains via alternate selection of available players. Alternatively, all the players put their sticks in a pile and the sticks are tossed out of the pile to opposing sides. In more formally organized play, it is played in rinks often designed for roller hockey and can be indoor or outdoor rinks. There are also rinks built specifically for hockey played on foot, and they are referred to as dek hockey or ball hockey rinks. Such rinks can also be used for roller hockey games.

== History ==
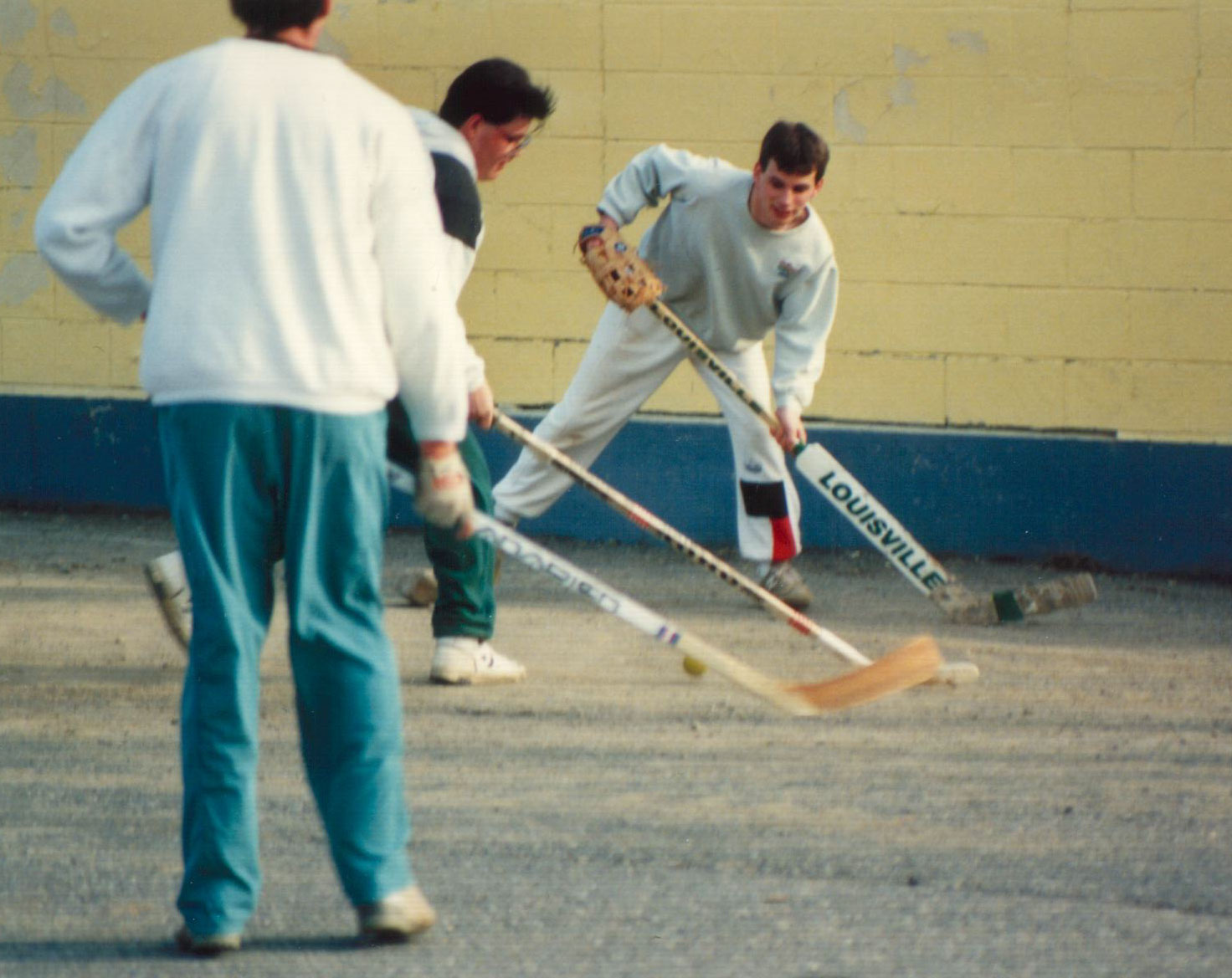
A game of street hockey in St. Andrews, New Brunswick, Canada.

Road hockey is believed to have begun when roads started getting paved in wealthier parts of North America, around the turn of the 20th century. The term street hockey was thus started in Canada at some similar time, but a search of records on the internet and in several libraries by fans of hockey, in general, has not turned up an exact year. The sport and thus the term street hockey eventually spread south to the United States. Most people who play the sport generally agree that no single person or entity invented the term "street hockey" but that it simply invented itself, just like the term "ice hockey," since it describes a form of hockey. People would play the game in the street so they had to ask people to play by asking them if wanted to play hockey out in the street.

Also, since the cost of smaller-sized home ice rinks was too expensive for professional players, many would often play street hockey throughout the summer months to keep in shape physically. That also offered them a chance to work on various different aspects of the game in a cost-effective manner. Before the era of big salaries, many semi-professional and professional players would play in pickup games with each other when they lived within driving distance of each other. In-line hockey is considered less expensive than ice hockey. Therefore, more likely for children to play and keep up with, this can include their game and fitness.

It was only in the early 1970s, when Raymond W. Leclerc, the founder of the Mylec Corporation and the creator of the No Bounce orange ball, along with several prominent players in the Northeastern United States and Southeastern Canada, established rules for the more organized forms of the game. These rules were quickly adopted by most leagues in the area and then eventually spread throughout the US and Canada by a printed rulebook, which people could purchase. LeClerc is informally recognized as the "Father of Street Hockey."

After a few years of experimenting with all the dynamics, Leclerc built a model site in 1974 to play and advance the game in Leominster, Massachusetts. The site, Leominster DekHockey Centre, has 3 outdoor rinks all with modular sport court surfaces and is informally known as the "Home of DekHockey." Various leagues and tournaments soon were springing up throughout those regions. The game then spread South and West as the Northeast US players relocated to different areas of the United States and Canadian players moved outside of the Ontario and Quebec provinces.

In Canada, the sport was organized for tournament play on a provincial and national level in the late 1970s, with the founding of the Canadian Ball Hockey Association. More formal organization of the sport quickly followed, which led to provincial tournaments and eventually the Canadian National Championships.

In the US, the sport was organized for league/season play on a national and state level in 2020, with the formation of the National Ball Hockey League.

== Gameplay ==
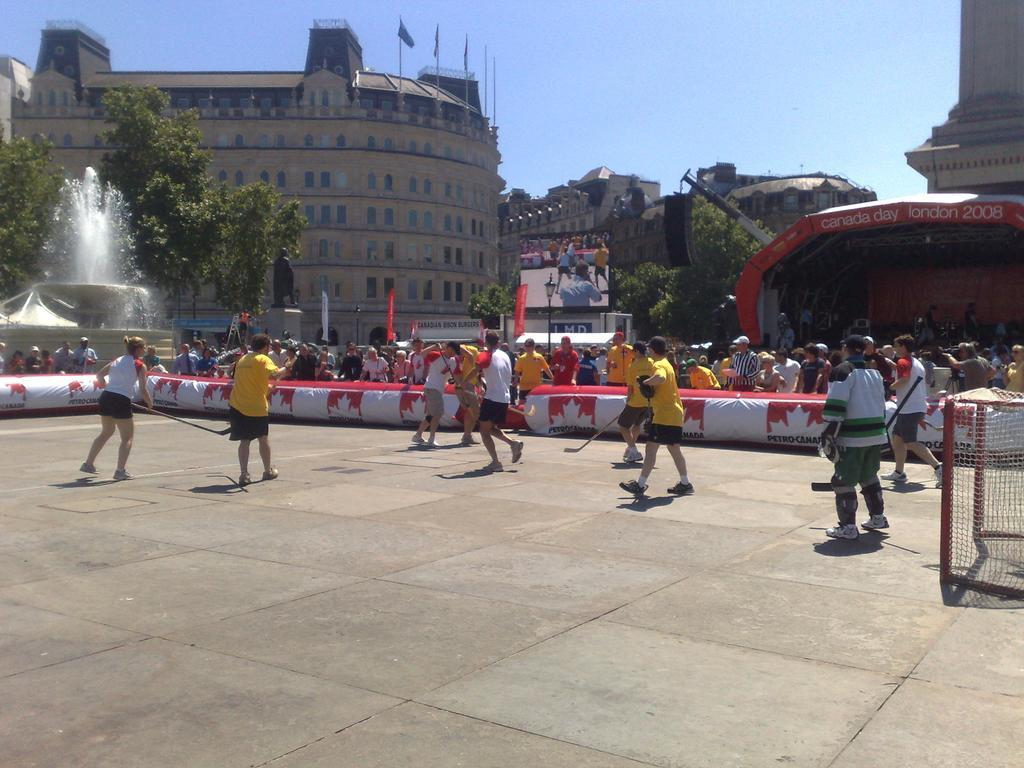
A street hockey game in Trafalgar Square in London, England, held in conjunction with Canada Day celebrations

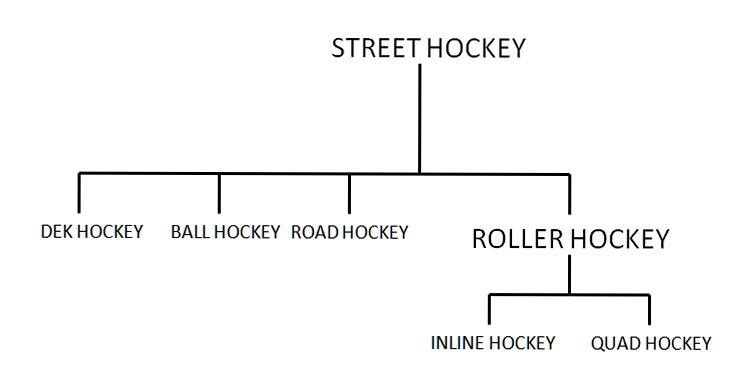
Various forms of street hockey

Street hockey is based on ice hockey, bandy, field hockey, or floor hockey and the overall purpose is the same: to score more goals than your opponent by shooting the ball or puck into the opposing team's net using your stick.

=== Ice hockey variant ===
The ice hockey variant is less dangerous than ice hockey, and there are fewer incidents in in-line hockey. It is typically played on foot on some outdoor asphalt, cement or modular sport surface. The most popular balls of choice are orange "no bounce" plastic balls that are specifically made for street hockey, as well as tennis balls. Pucks are rarely used due to the playing surface, but, in some instances, a special puck designed with bearings for roller hockey can also be used. If a puck is used, generally the players agree for safety purposes to make every effort to keep the puck on the ground since the players generally don't wear protective headgear and if a puck were to strike a player in the head it could cause serious medical injury and damage. Since they commonly use a water-filled ball, it is less dangerous than using a rubber puck. It is also safer because there are no skate blades or body checking like there is in ice hockey. Sometimes, street hockey is played with little protective equipment, therefore levels of physical contact are agreed upon beforehand by the participants. The game does permit a level of physical contact similar to that allowed in basketball.

Rules and playing styles can differ from area to area depending upon the traditions a certain group has set aside. In informal play, the game often begins one of two ways: 1) a so-called "NHL face-off", in which the two opposing centers hit their sticks against each other three times saying "N", "H", "L". Immediately following the "L" the two players fight to see who claims possession of the ball or puck 2) One team simply takes the ball or puck out from behind their goalie net, similar to how a basketball game resumes when one team scores a basket.

=== Floor hockey ===
Street hockey can also be played on indoor basketball courts and/or gymnasiums. However, these types of games fall under the category of floor hockey. In organized leagues, floor hockey often has specific rules in place that differ slightly from outdoor street hockey. The walls or fencing of these "rinks" serve to keep the ball, puck, or disc, in play similarly to the boards of an ice rink.

Floor hockey has several variants, uses either a puck or type of disk, but only one, called "Cosom hockey", resembles the more conventional format of North American street hockey. Cosom hockey, and floorball are sometimes considered formal subsets of street hockey since they have such different rules.

Cosom hockey

Cosom hockey is named for Cosom, a major supplier of physical education class equipment) and often uses a closed puck.

Floorball

Floorball bears a resemblance to both field hockey and North American ice hockey, but is actually a variant of the ice team sport of bandy.

Sam Jacks floor hockey

"Sam Jacks" floor hockey was developed in Canada in the 1930s but did not use a ball or puck, but a felt disc with a hole in its centre and required players to use straight bladeless sticks. Although it was this game, whose rules were codified by Sam Jacks in 1930s Canada that helped form the early conceptualization of ringette (also created by Sam Jacks) and was initially believed may become a type of "court sport", ringette did not develop as a close ice variant relative of the floor hockey game. After its initial rules structure was developed by Mirl Arthur McCarthy, the game of basketball become more influential on the early foundational design of ringette. However, the early format of ringette was still in closer relationship to Jacks's floor hockey than either the other floor variants, street hockey, or ice hockey.

Gym ringette

Gym ringette should not be mistaken as a variant of either street hockey or floor hockey due to the fact that this game was designed in the latter half of 20th century Canada as an off-ice variant of the ice skating team sport of ringette.

=== New alternatives ===
==== Lacrosse boxes ====
A fairly new and popular alternative to playing hockey on the street in Canada is to play in outdoor lacrosse boxes. The lacrosse boxes contain the same asphalt surface as the streets, but offers a more realistic feeling of hockey since the playing area is larger than the average street, in addition to having boards that surround the lacrosse box. Players also do not need to worry about traffic and pedestrians. However, one downside to this is the smaller size of in-place lacrosse nets.

Similarly to lacrosse boxes, outdoor rinks are becoming quite popular in public areas around the United States. These rinks allow for a place to play off of what can often become dangerous streets. Outdoor rinks are usually covered in a sport interlocking plastic tile surface so equipment does not wear down as quickly as on asphalt. Some are concrete which is painted with a special paint designed to provide traction for feet and roller blades. Many rinks are also covered to allow play during wet weather, and lighted for nighttime hockey. There are also a large number of indoor rinks sprinkled throughout the United States and Canada. No official tally has been made as to the number of indoor rinks but the unofficial count is over 500 combining Canada and the United States.

== Equipment ==
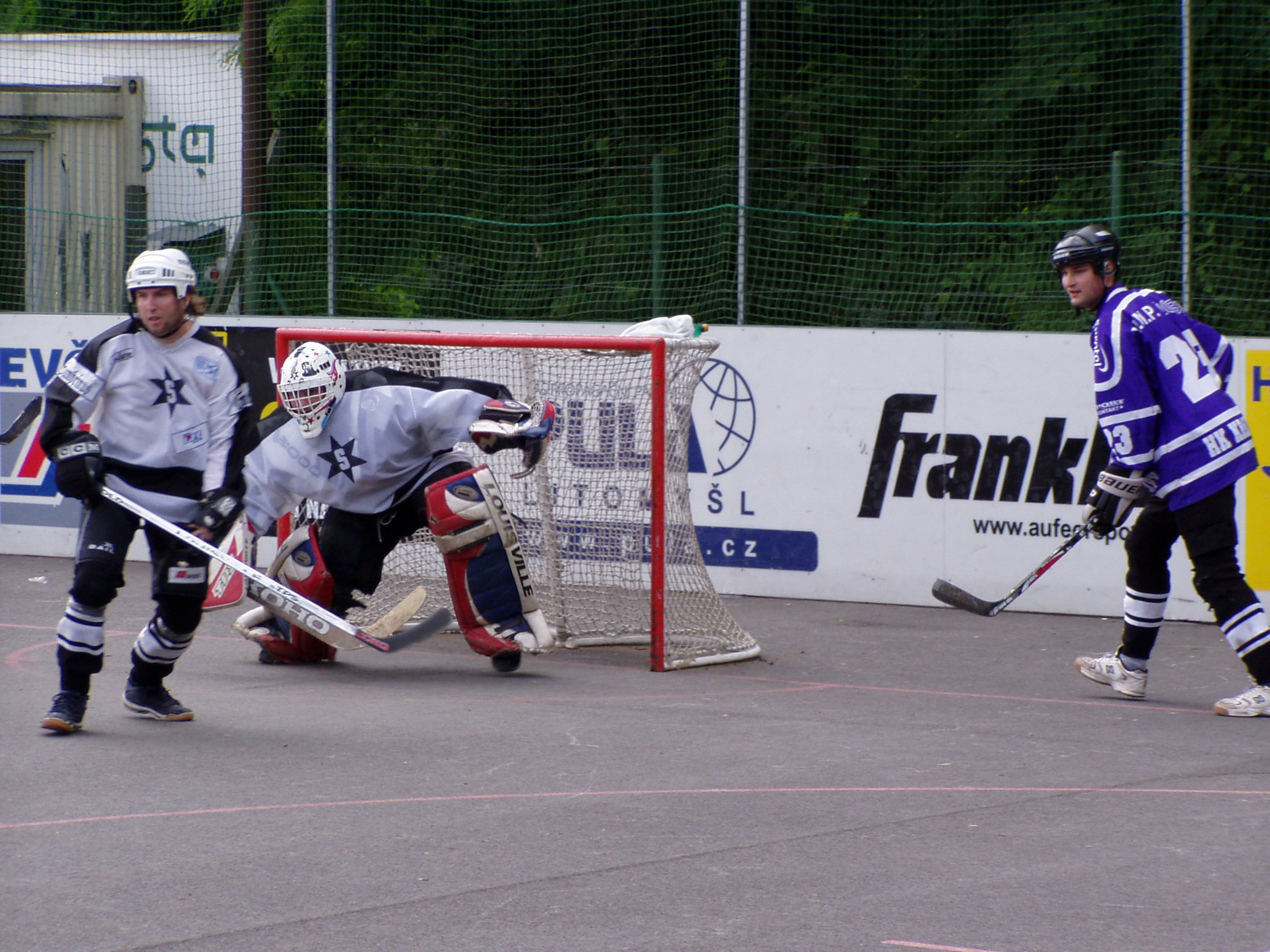
Organized ball hockey league in Czech Republic (team Svítkov Stars)

=== North America ===
In North America, equipment for street hockey is based on designs which originated in ice hockey. This equipment has been designed to be lighter and more flexible due to the exclusion of body checks in street hockey. All of the ice hockey-style equipment is necessary except for certified helmets.

In pickup style games, most "player tend to play with some combination of the following:

- hockey gloves
- shin guards
- eye protection
- athletic support
- mouth guards

Shin guards are often of the soccer type when the game is played on foot, though several companies now manufacturer and sell shin pads that are lightweight, durable, and have been specifically designed and marketed for street hockey and roller hockey (either inline hockey or quad hockey).

==== Goaltenders ====
Goalies still typically wear equipment similar in appearance to their ice hockey counterparts for safety but partly also to help block more of the goal area. However, such goalie equipment used in street hockey is generally lighter than that used in ice hockey due to the reduced weight and density of the ball (or puck) that is typically used in street hockey as compared to the hard vulcanized rubber puck used in ice hockey.

==== Sticks ====
A street hockey stick is similar to an ice hockey stick in shape and size, but made of materials that will better stand up to use on asphalt or a similar playing surface. It has two main parts, the shaft and the blade. The shaft is often made of aluminum, graphite, or wood. The blade is usually made of some type of plastic, typically a blend of polyurethane, and attaches to the shaft by insertion into the shaft, with the inside of the shaft being coated with a specialized type of glue that requires heating to settle and solidify. Other shafts are designed to have the blade screwed onto the shaft and secured in place with screws. Some street hockey sticks are made in one-piece form and are made out of plastic, polyurethane, graphite, aluminum, wood, or a blend of these and other materials. Ice hockey and inline hockey sticks can also be used. However, street hockey sticks are usually cheaper and more durable for playing on asphalt and concrete, and as such are more common for this reason where the game is played on those surfaces. In organized dek and ball hockey leagues, most players use more expensive sticks as the quality of game play is much higher caliber than pickup street hockey and the Mulit Modular Surfaces see the games played which allow a safer and faster version of Dekhockey and are much safer for running that concrete or blacktop.

==== Street ball ====
With the success of the widely used orange ball for street hockey, many different color varieties have been introduced due to changing balls for weather conditions, such as yellow, red, pink, and even a glow in the dark ball. Several ball manufacturers now market the balls with the temperature range the ball was designed for on the packaging itself. Most hockey ball manufacturers sell their balls according to the following temperature range: red/orange = hot/warm above 60 degrees, pink = cool - between 40 and 60 degrees, yellow = cold - below 40 degrees. A tennis ball or whiffle ball can also be used as an alternative to the orange ball for street hockey, as it is much softer than the orange ball, therefore reducing the risk of injury.

International rules

The International Street and Ball Hockey Federation is the worldwide governing body of official ball hockey tournaments and leagues, and they officially recognize two types of balls for play: a hard, warm climate ball for adult or youth play or a softer version for colder weather.

== Governing bodies ==
=== International ===
The International Street and Ball Hockey Federation is officially recognized as the governing body of the sport by the International Ice Hockey Federation. The non-profit was founded in 1993 and has provided international competitions since 1995.

=== North America ===
The Canadian Ball Hockey Association is the official governing body of ball hockey in Canada as recognized by the I.S.B.H.F. USA Ball Hockey is the official governing body of street and dek hockey in the United States as recognized by the I.S.B.H.F.

The National Ball Hockey League is the first officially sanctioned league by USA Ball Hockey the official governing body of street and dek hockey in the United States as recognized by the I.S.B.H.F.

=== Europe and Asia ===
Several European and Asian countries have their own governing bodies where the sport has enough players to have a national following and presence. Generally, these countries have rule books based upon either the Canadian, American, or I.S.B.H.F. rule books, or a combination of some type of these.

== Tournaments ==
=== International ===
The International Street and Ball Hockey Federation holds several international tournaments with most being broken down by age groups and gender. These tournaments are typically bi-annual, such as the Men's and Women's 20 and over, the Men's and Women's Under 20, the Men's and Women's Under 18 and the Men's and Women's Under 16. There are also a Men's Masters Tournament for players aged 40 and over and a Women's Masters Tournament for players aged 35 and over.

=== North America ===
There are dozens of tournaments held throughout North America every year. Typically, tournaments start on a Friday and end on Sunday evenings.

=== Popularity ===
According to the ISBHF, there are street hockey leagues in over 60 countries worldwide. As mentioned in the history section, one can safely assume that where ever people are playing ice hockey, people are also playing some form of street hockey.

== See also ==
- Floor hockey
- Floorball
- Ball hockey
- Field hockey or "grass hockey" are similar sports
- Shinny
- Ice hockey
- Ringette
- Gym ringette
