= Yasumasa Nishino =

Yasumasa Nishino may refer to:

- Yasumasa Nishino (footballer) (西野 泰正, born 1982), Japanese footballer
- Yasumasa Nishino (swimmer) (西野 恭正, 1925–2004), Japanese swimmer
