= Swimming at the 1955 Pan American Games – Men's 100 metre backstroke =

Men's 100 metre backstroke at the 1955 Pan American Games
- Venue: -
- Dates: March 23 (preliminaries and finals)

Medalists
Gold medal	Frank McKinney	United States
Silver medal	Pedro Galvão	Argentina
Bronze medal	Leonide Baarcke	United States

The men's 100 metre backstroke competition of the swimming events at the 1955 Pan American Games took place on 23 March. The last Pan American Games champion was Allen Stack of US.

This race consisted of two lengths of the pool, all in backstroke.

== Results ==
All times are in minutes and seconds.

KEY:	q	Fastest non-qualifiers	Q	Qualified	GR	Games record	NR	National record	PB	Personal best	SB	Seasonal best

=== Final ===
The final was held on March 23.

Rank	Name	Nationality	Time	Notes
1st place, gold medalist(s)	Frank McKinney	United States	1:07.1	= GR
2nd place, silver medalist(s)	Pedro Galvão	Argentina	1:07.8	
3rd place, bronze medalist(s)	Leonide Baarcke	United States	1:07.9	
4	João Gonçalves Filho	Brazil	1:08.3	
5	Ted Simpson	Canada	1:08.9	
6	Clemente Mejía	Mexico	1:10.3	
7	Peter Witteried	United States	1:10.3	
8	-	-	-	
