= Buddy Baarcke =

American swimmer and swimming coach (1931–2017)

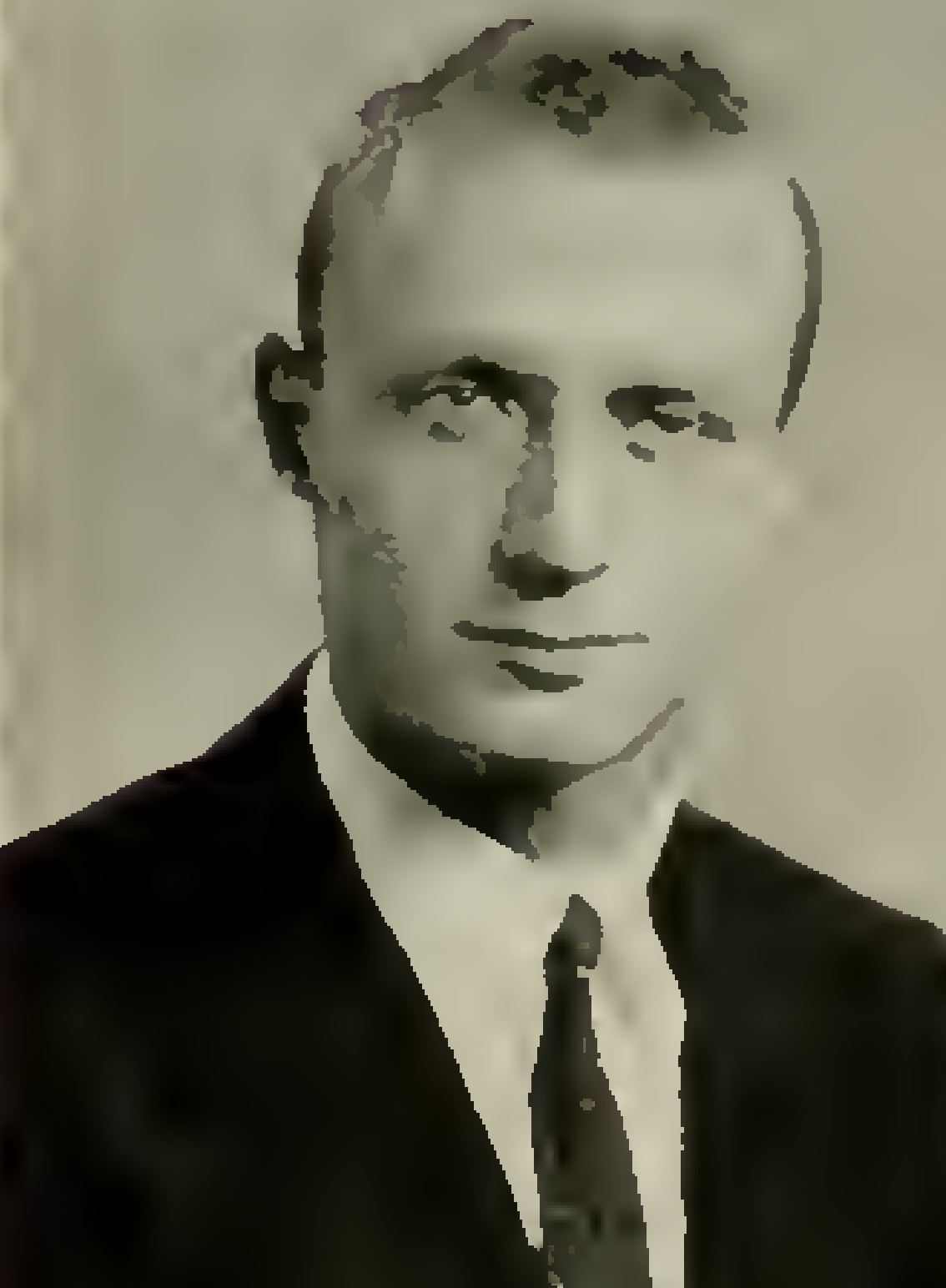
- Baarcke in 1954

Personal information
- Full name: Leonide Alfred Baarcke Jr.
- Nickname: "Buddy"
- National team: United States
- Born: September 23, 1931
- Died: March 10, 2017 (aged 85)

Sport
- Sport: Swimming
- Strokes: Butterfly, freestyle, backstroke
- College team: University of North Carolina at Chapel Hill
Medal record
Representing the United States
Pan American Games
Gold medal – first place	1955 Mexico City	4 × 100 m medley relay
Bronze medal – third place	1955 Mexico City	100 m backstroke

Leonide Alfred "Buddy" Baarcke, Jr. (September 23, 1931 – March 10, 2017) was an American competitive swimmer, Pan American Games medalist and swimming coach. Baarcke was the first American to set a world record with the butterfly stroke, doing so in the 100-yard event, and he was the first American to record times under 1 minute over 100 yards in the freestyle, backstroke, and butterfly events. At the 1955 Pan American Games, Baarcke won bronze in the 100 m backstroke and gold with his team in the 4 × 100 m medley relay.

As a coach, Baarcke assisted with the University of North Carolina swim team and later with the University of Florida Gators swim team. He also coached for the Swimming Association of the Palm Beaches, where his junior swimmers won several races at the AAU Junior Olympics and national age group championships.

== Biography ==
Leonide Alfred Baarcke was born on September 23, 1931; he came to be known as "Buddy". Baarcke learned to swim in Alabama, growing up in Birmingham.

=== Competitive swimming ===
Baarcke originally swam competitively at Sewanee Military Academy, graduating in 1949, before studying English at the University of North Carolina at Chapel Hill. At North Carolina, Baarcke won Southern Conference titles in the 100- and 200-yard backstroke and placed sixth in the 100-yard backstroke at the 1953 NCAA championships. Baarcke was then drafted into the military for two years, where he continued to swim competitively.

In 1954, Baarcke broke the 100-yard butterfly world record with a time of 57.3 seconds, which made him the first American to set a world record with the stroke; he also broke the US national record in the 100-metre butterfly. Baarcke competed at the first ever 100-yard butterfly event at the 1954 National Indoor Championships, (Note: Sources conflict on where he finished, with a 2008 article in the Journal of Olympic History writing that he finished first, and a contemporary news report from The Harvard Crimson stating that he did not finish first after being overtaken in the last 25 yards by Dave Hawkins.) where William Yorzyk, the future first Olympic gold medalist in the 200-metre butterfly, saw the butterfly stroke swum for the first time.

Representing the United States at the 1955 Pan American Games, Baarcke placed third in the 100 m backstroke and first in the 4 × 100 m medley relay with his team, having trained with the Tar Heel swimmers and divers. After the Pan American Games, Baarcke went on a swim tour of Asia, before beginning training for the 1956 Summer Olympics; he became ill with hepatitis before the games and did not compete. Baarcke was the first American to record times under 1 minute over 100 yards in the freestyle, backstroke, and butterfly events, and he achieved All-American status in backstroke and butterfly.

=== Coaching ===
Baarcke began his coaching career while at the University of North Carolina, working as a coaching assistant in 1954, 1957 and 1958, while he was a post-graduate student. He then moved to Florida and coached for the Swimming Association of the Palm Beaches, where his junior swimmers won several races at the AAU Junior Olympics and national age group championships. From 1987 to 2003, Baarcke was an assistant coach for the University of Florida Gators swim team. According to the American Swimming Coaches Association, during his coaching career, Baarcke was involved with coaching an Olympic gold medalist, other Olympic medalists, and nine world-ranked swimmers.

In 2015 or 2016, Baarcke was inducted into the American Swimming Coaches Association's coaching Hall of Fame, (Note: Swimming World writes that he was inducted in September 2016, while on the American Swimming Coaches Association website, he is listed as being in the class of 2015.) and he is also in the North Carolina Swimming Hall of Fame and the Palm Beach County Sports Hall of Fame.

=== Death ===
Baarcke died on March 10, 2017, aged 85, after a short illness.

== See also ==
- List of Pan American Games medalists in swimming
