= Floor hockey =

Group of sports

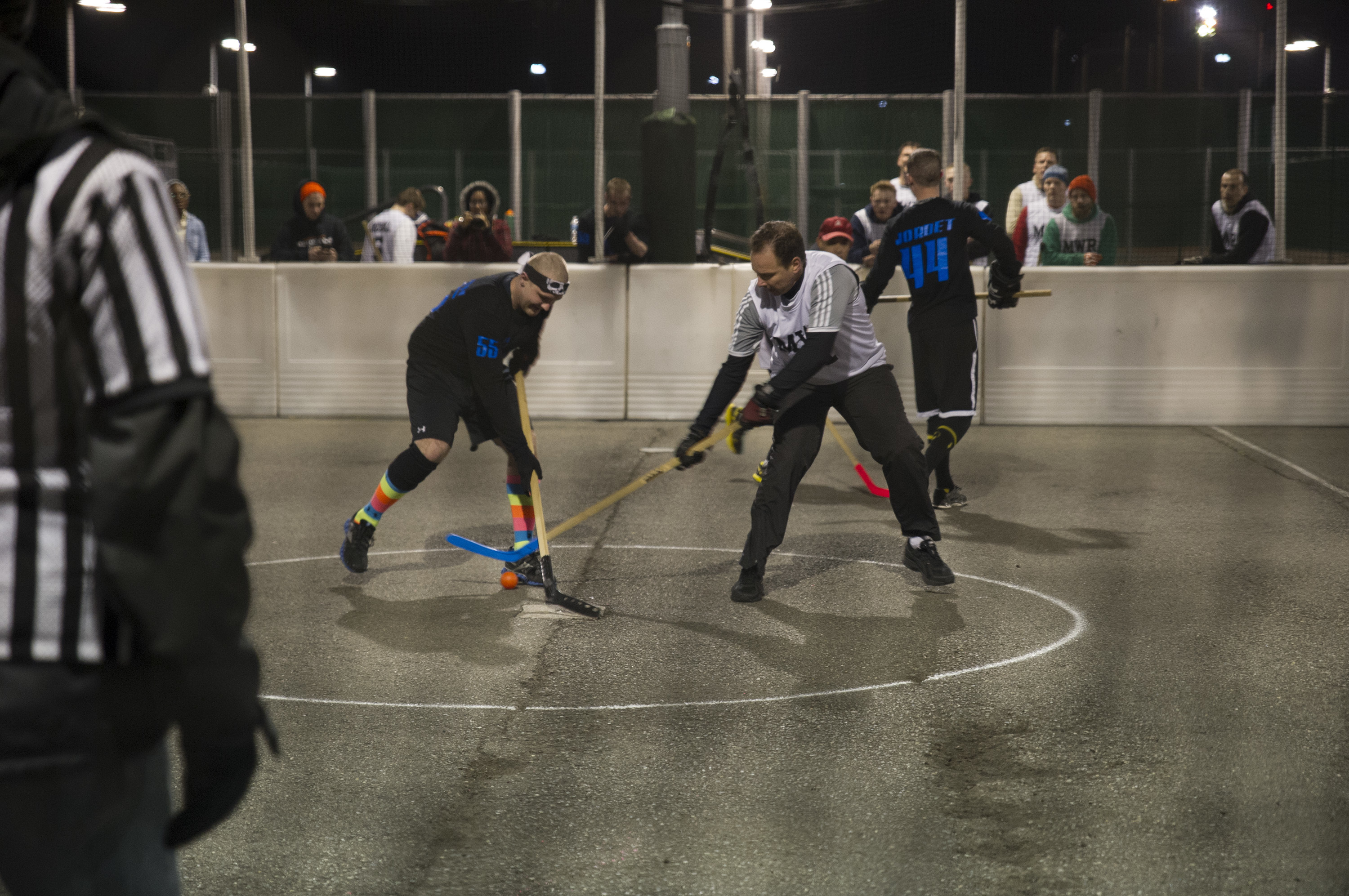
Floor hockey game being played outdoors on asphalt

Floor hockey is a broad term for several indoor floor game codes which involve two teams using a stick and type of ball or puck. Pucks are either open or closed. These games are played either on foot or with wheeled skates. Variants typically reflect the style of ice hockey, field hockey, bandy or some other combination of sport. Games are commonly known by various names including cosom hockey, ball hockey, floorball, or simply floor hockey.

Two floor hockey variants involve the use of wheeled skates and are categorized as roller sports under the title of roller hockey. Quad hockey uses quad skates, commonly known as roller skates, and appears similar to bandy, while inline hockey uses inline skates and is of the ice hockey variation.

All styles and codes are played on dry, flat floor surfaces such as a gymnasium or basketball court. As in other hockey codes, players on each team attempt to shoot a ball, disk or puck into a goal using sticks, some with a curved end and others a straight, bladeless stick.

Floor hockey games differ from street hockey in that the games are more structured and have a codified set of rules. The variants which do not involve wheeled skates and use a closed puck are sometimes used as a form of dryland training to help teach and train children to play ice hockey while the floorball variant is sometimes used as a dryland training program for bandy.

== History ==
Floor hockey was originally a physical fitness sport in many public schools developed for physical education class but has since developed several variants played in a variety of ways and is no longer restricted to educational institutions.

=== Canada ===
Floor hockey codes derived from ice hockey were first officially played in Montreal, Quebec, Canada in 1875, but the game's official creation is credited to Canada's Sports Hall of Fame inductee, Samuel Perry Jacks, better known as "Sam Jacks". Jacks is the individual who codified floor hockey's first set of rules in 1936. However, his version did not involve either a closed disk (puck) or a ball, but an open disk (disk with a hole in the center). At the time, Jacks was working as assistant physical director at the West End YMCA in Toronto. His achievement was later recognized by the Youth Branch of the United Nations.

In 1947, Sam Jacks became the head coach of the Canadian Floor Hockey Team which competed in the AAU Junior Olympic Games (Amateur Athletic Union) in the USA where the Canadian team finished in third place. It is unclear whether the style of play was the one of his own making or some other format.

In 1991 the Canadian Ball Hockey Association (CBHA) was formed to provide more formal leagues of ball-based floor hockey. The CBHA runs leagues for men, women, and juniors, and organizes National Championships for each division.

=== United States of America ===
In 1947, Canada's Sam Jacks was the head coach of the Canadian Floor Hockey Team which travelled from Canada to compete in the AAU Junior Olympic Games in the USA. The Canadians finished in third place. It is unclear if the style of play was the one he codified in 1936 or another variant.

In 1962, one of the first variants of organized indoor hockey games were created in Battle Creek, Michigan in the United States by Tom Harter who used plastic sticks and pucks. It is unclear whether other floor hockey codes using a ball or a felt puck were in existence in the USA at the time or if this marked a new emerging variant in the country.

In 1974, Barbara Walters & Ethel Kennedy played "Sam Jacks" floor hockey (incorrectly labelled "Floor Ringette") at Margaret Chapman School. A photograph was taken of one of the school's students, Maria, stick handling by Ethel Kennedy during the game. The game involved disabled children and was organized by the Joseph P. Kennedy Foundation. This was during a period where this particular variant was being changed and adapted from its initial form in order to make it playable for the Special Olympics.

In 2003, the National Intramural-Recreational Sports Association Hockey Committee released a baseline set of rules for a specific intramural floor hockey variant for college campuses across the United States.

=== Special Olympics ===
In 1970, the Special Olympics World Winter Games added team floor hockey as an event, with the distinction of it being the only team sport under its purview.

In 1974, Barbara Walters & Ethel Kennedy played "Sam Jacks" floor hockey (incorrectly labelled "Floor Ringette") at Margaret Chapman School. A photograph was taken of one of the school's students, Maria, stick handling by Ethel Kennedy during the game. The game involved handicapped children and was organized by the Joseph P. Kennedy Foundation. This was during a period where this particular variant was being changed and adapted from its initial form in order to make it playable for the Special Olympics.

== Equipment ==
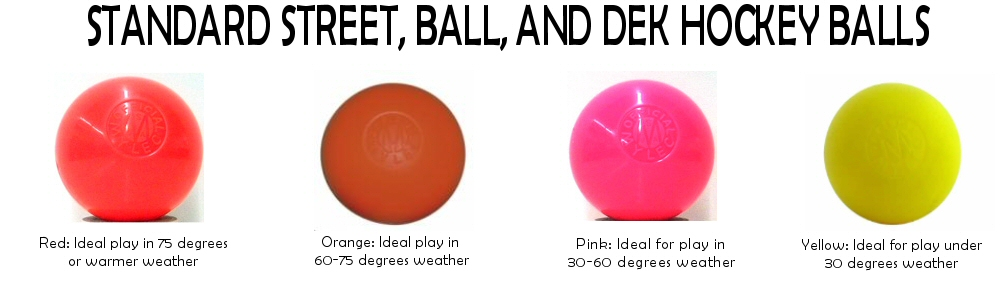
This is a standard hockey ball that is used to play street hockey, dek hockey, and ball hockey.

Floor hockey equipment differs from code to code. The types of checking and protective equipment allowed also vary. It is also important to note that when it comes to equipment, many floor hockey games today use some type of plastic, the first of which wasn't invented until 1907 by Leo Baekeland.

=== Object of play ===
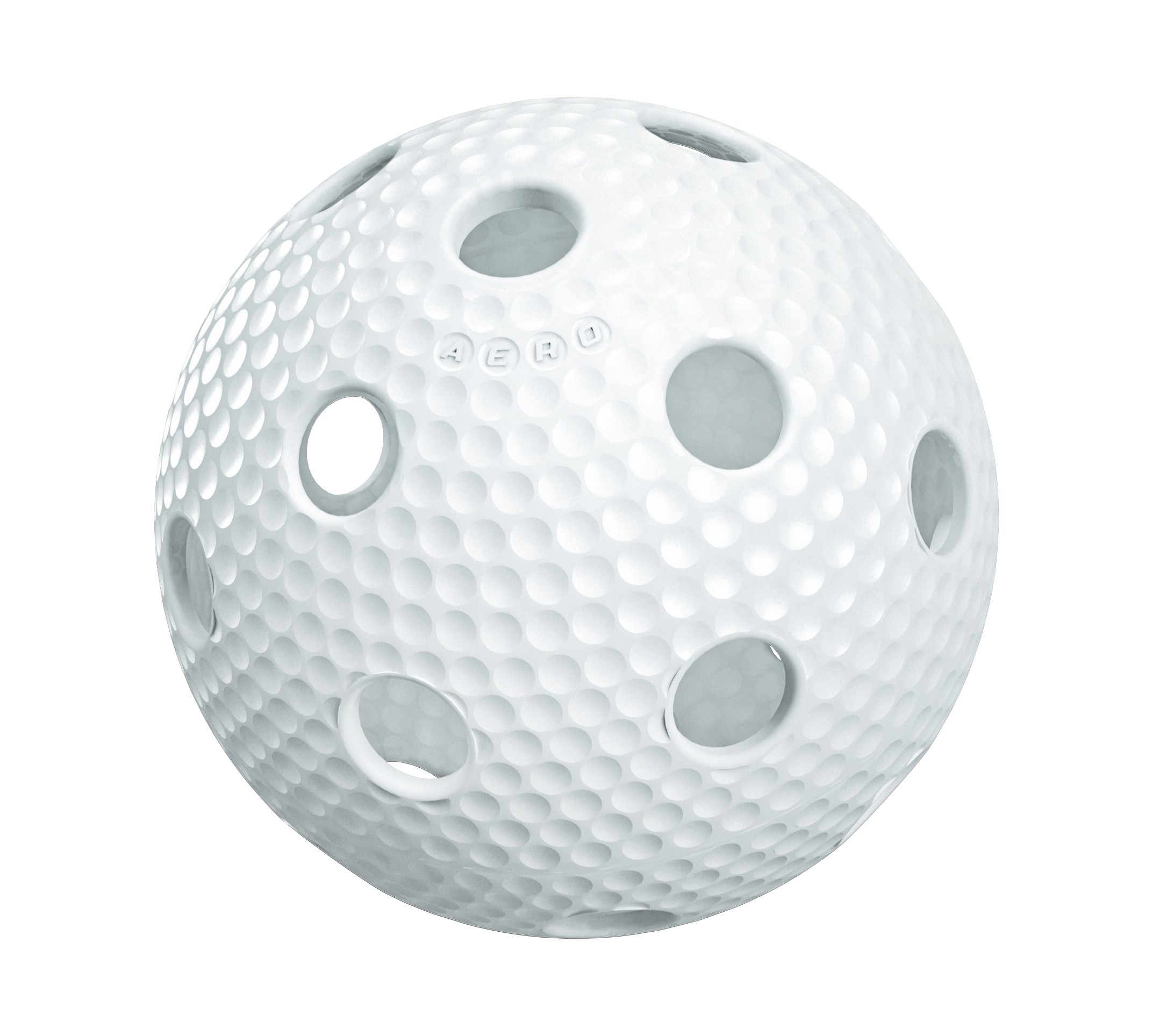
Style of ball used in floorball

Various objects can be used for play depending on the code, but they fall into three main types: a ball, a closed disk called a puck, or an open disk with a hole in the middle. These objects are variously constructed of either plastic or a felt-like material.

=== Sticks ===
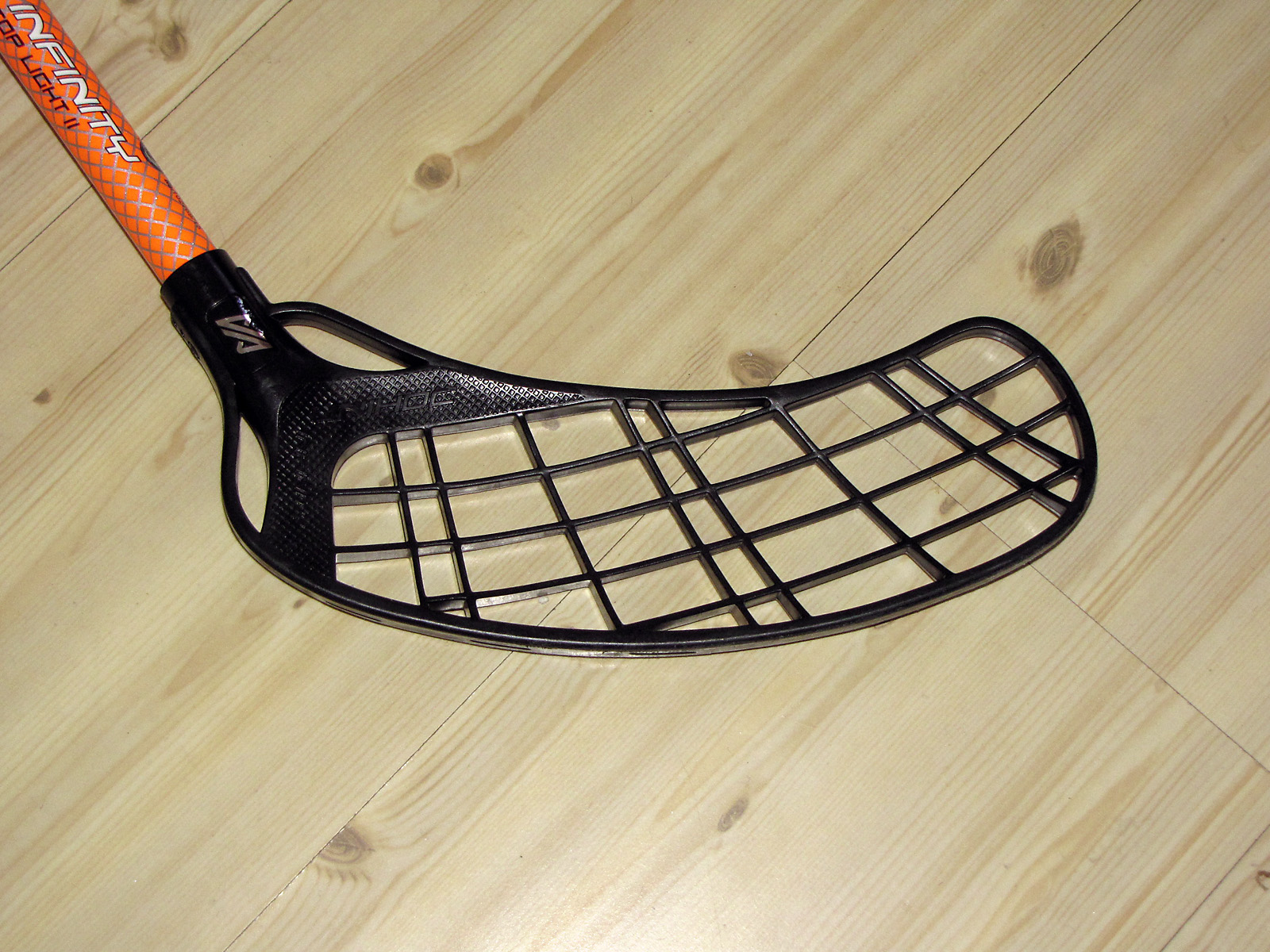
Example of a blade used on a floorball stick

Sticks used for play depend on the game codes. Some codes require standard ice hockey, field hockey or bandy sticks, while others use lightweight plastic sticks.

The Special Olympics version of floor hockey uses blade-less wooden sticks.

==== Types of sticks ====
The type of floor hockey game that is played and the object of play that is used often determines the type of stick. The material used to make floor hockey sticks varies and can include plastic or some type of composite. Shafts are either rectangular or rounded like in the case of a broomstick.

==== Ball and puck ====
Games which use a ball such as quad hockey will typically use a stick ending in a type of hook though this is not always the case as can be seen in ball hockey and road hockey. Games which use a type of puck (closed disk) such as cosom hockey and inline hockey, will typically use a stick ending in a blade with sharp angle at the end of the shaft with a blade which generally lies flat along the floor.

In the case of floorball the end of the stick involves a design that is a mix between a blade and a hook.

==== Exceptions ====
Three exceptions in regards to sticks can found in floor hockey. These games use either an open disk or a ring.

The first is in the case of Sam Jacks's floor hockey, the Canadian variant developed during the Great Depression of the 1930s. The second one can be found in the Special Olympics which was developed in the 1960s. The third can be found in gym ringette which was developed in the 1990s, but gym ringette itself is not in fact a direct variant of floor hockey and was more heavily influenced by the ice sport of ringette.

In all the first two examples the puck used is in fact an open disk, and is a type of felt disk with a hole in the middle. As a result a straight stick is used as a handle and does not include any type of blade or hook. The end however may include a type of drag-tip. Shafts are either rectangular or round like a broomstick handle.

In the third example, gym ringette uses a plastic shaft with a plastic drag-tip. Gym ringette does not use any type of puck. Instead, gym ringette uses a ring made of a type of rubber foam. The shaft is rectangular in shape.

== Variants ==
All floor hockey variants can be separated into four general categories based on four main variables: ball games, puck games (closed disk), disk games (open disk), and a separate category for wheeled skates called 'Roller Games'. The first three categories are floor hockey variants played on foot while the latter involves the use of wheeled skates. All four categories can have their own sub-divisions to help categorize the existing floor hockey variants even further.

=== Ball games (on foot) ===
==== Ball hockey ====
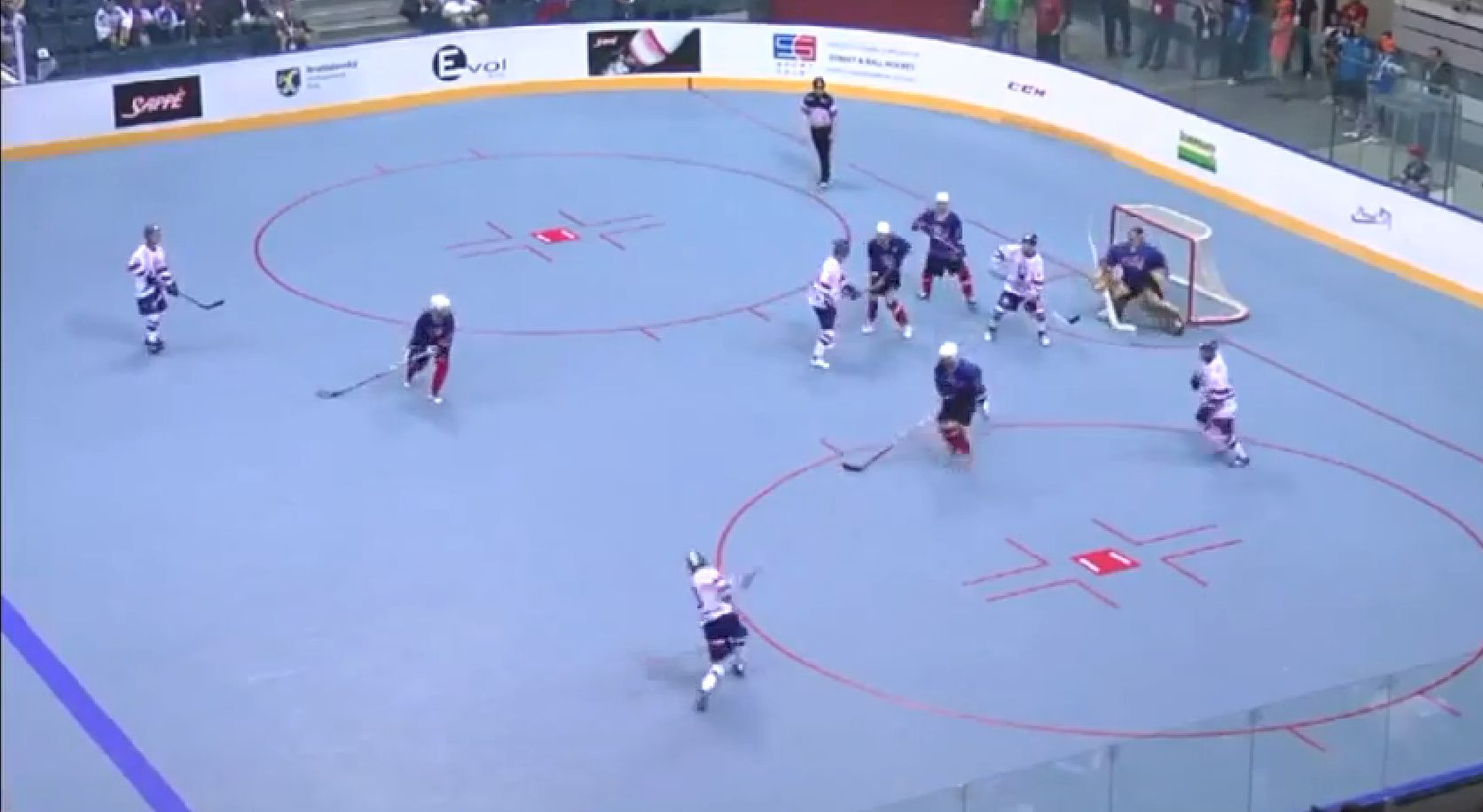
Ball hockey event

Ball hockey is an indoor game using a lightweight ball. Outdoor variants exist such as street hockey and dek hockey.

==== Floorball ====
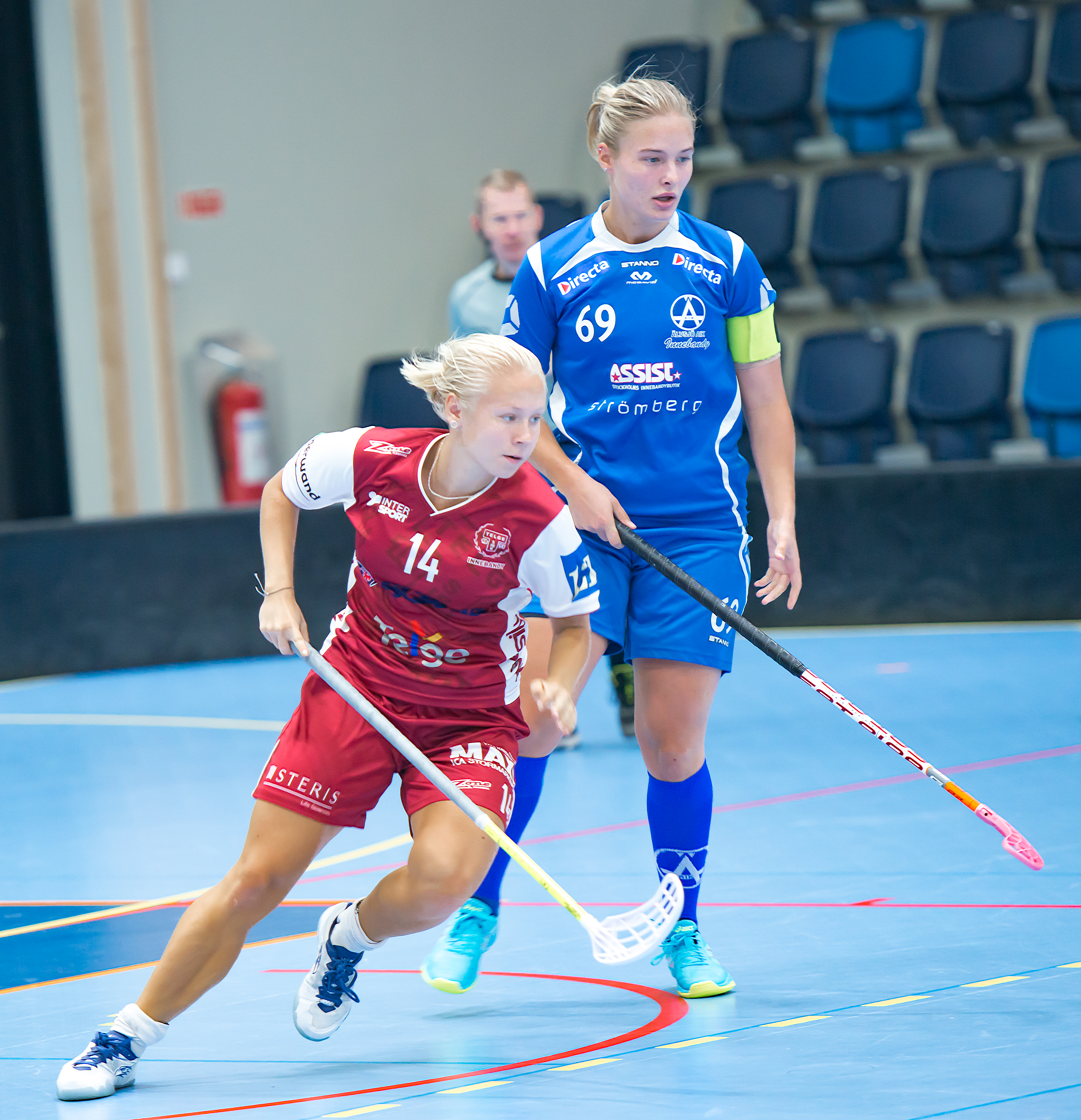
Women playing floorball

One variation which is especially popular in Europe, is floorball. Floorball uses a lightweight plastic ball and sticks made of plastic and carbon fiber. Limited checking is permitted.

==== Indoor hockey ====
Indoor hockey is an indoor variant of field hockey. Indoor hockey is played on a smaller area and between smaller teams than field hockey and the sidelines are replaced by solid barriers from which the ball rebounds and remains in play.

=== Puck games (on foot) ===
This section refers to floor hockey games using a closed disk often referred to as a "puck".

==== Cosom hockey ====
Another variation, cosom hockey, uses plastic sticks and pucks.

=== Ring games (on foot) ===
This section refers to floor hockey games using an toroid which is in some cases referred to as a puck and sometimes has been referred to as a ring.

==== Sam Jacks floor hockey ====
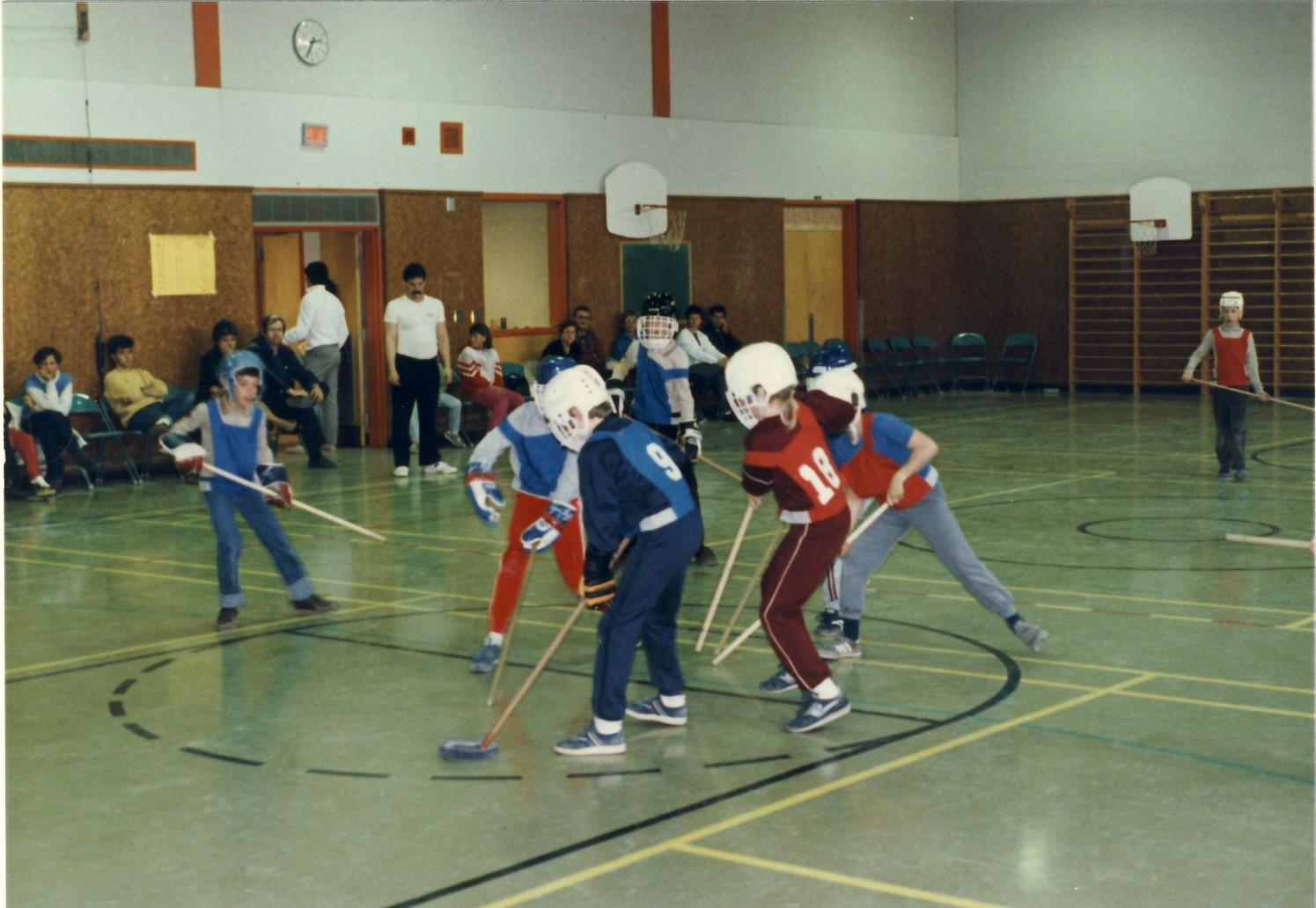
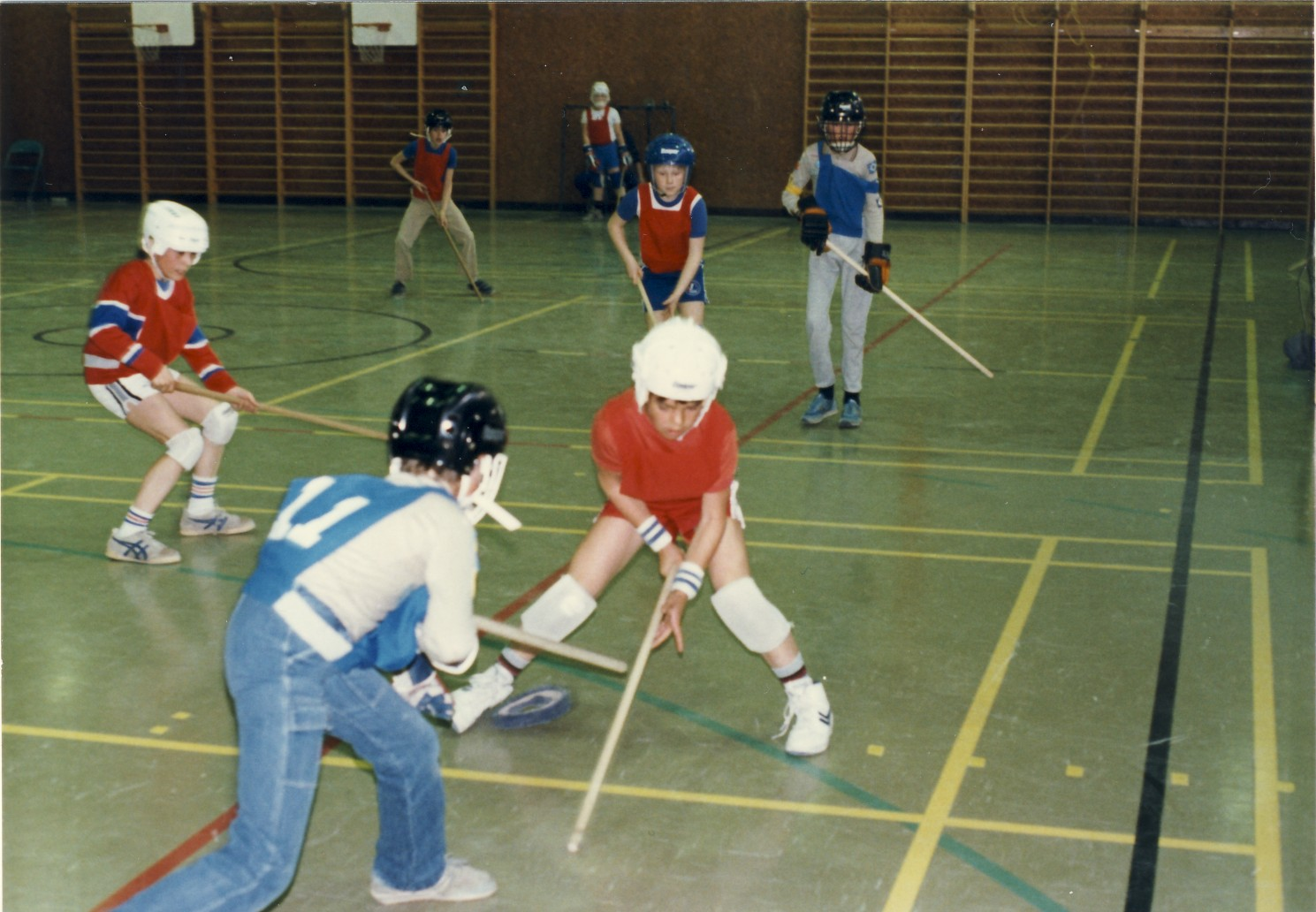
Play action during a floor hockey game (codified by Sam Jacks of Canada), part of a tournament for Cub Scouts held in Cap-Rouge, Québec, Canada, spring 1986

"Sam Jacks" floor hockey is an early Canadian design of floor hockey whose rules were created and codified by Canada's Sam Jacks in 1936. It is sometimes mistaken for ringette or gym ringette. The game uses straight, bladeless sticks and a disk made of felt with a hole in the middle. Several public schools in Canada used the game in physical education and gym classes, but the game is far less commonly played today.

Jacks would later create the ice team skating sport of ringette in Canada in 1963. Today ringette only loosely resembles floor hockey, with ringette having been influenced variously by rules in from basketball, ice hockey, and broomball when its first rules were designed. Though ringette's first experimental ring was a felt floor hockey puck (sometimes referred to as a "ring") it was quickly replaced by deck tennis rings due to the felt puck accumulating snow and sticking to the ice.

==== Gym Ringette ====
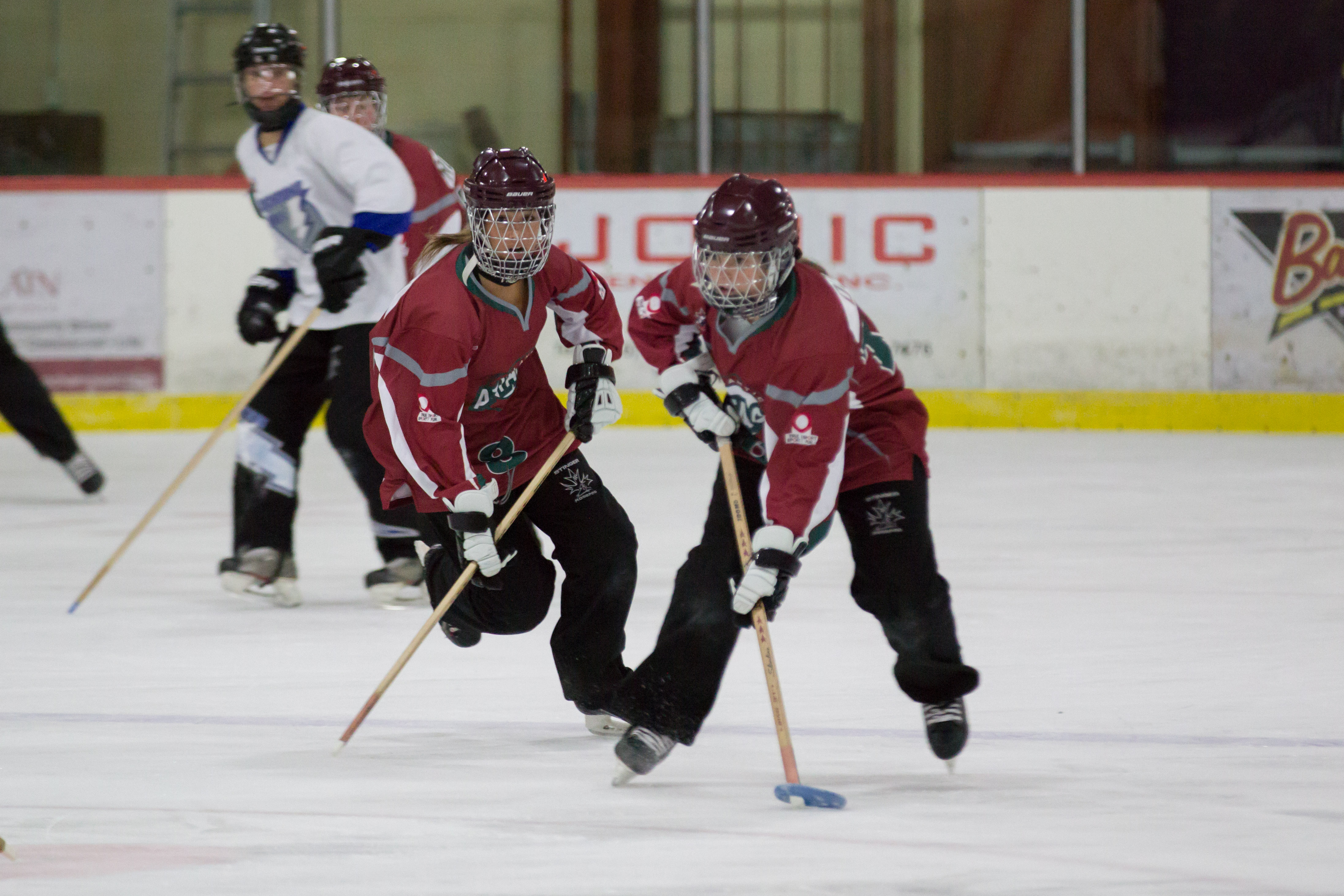
The Canadian ice sport of ringette was initially conceptualized as a court sport similar to an early 20th century version floor hockey codified by Sam Jacks

Gym ringette is the off-ice variant of the winter team skating sport of ringette and today is only distantly related to floor hockey. While the sport of ringette was initially influenced by the rules of basketball, ice hockey, broomball, and a variety of floor hockey games played during the early part of the 20th century, particularly the floor hockey style codified by Sam Jacks, gym ringette was developed in Canada near the end of the 20th century and was designed as an off-ice variant of the ice game of ringette rather than floor hockey.

==== Special Olympics ====
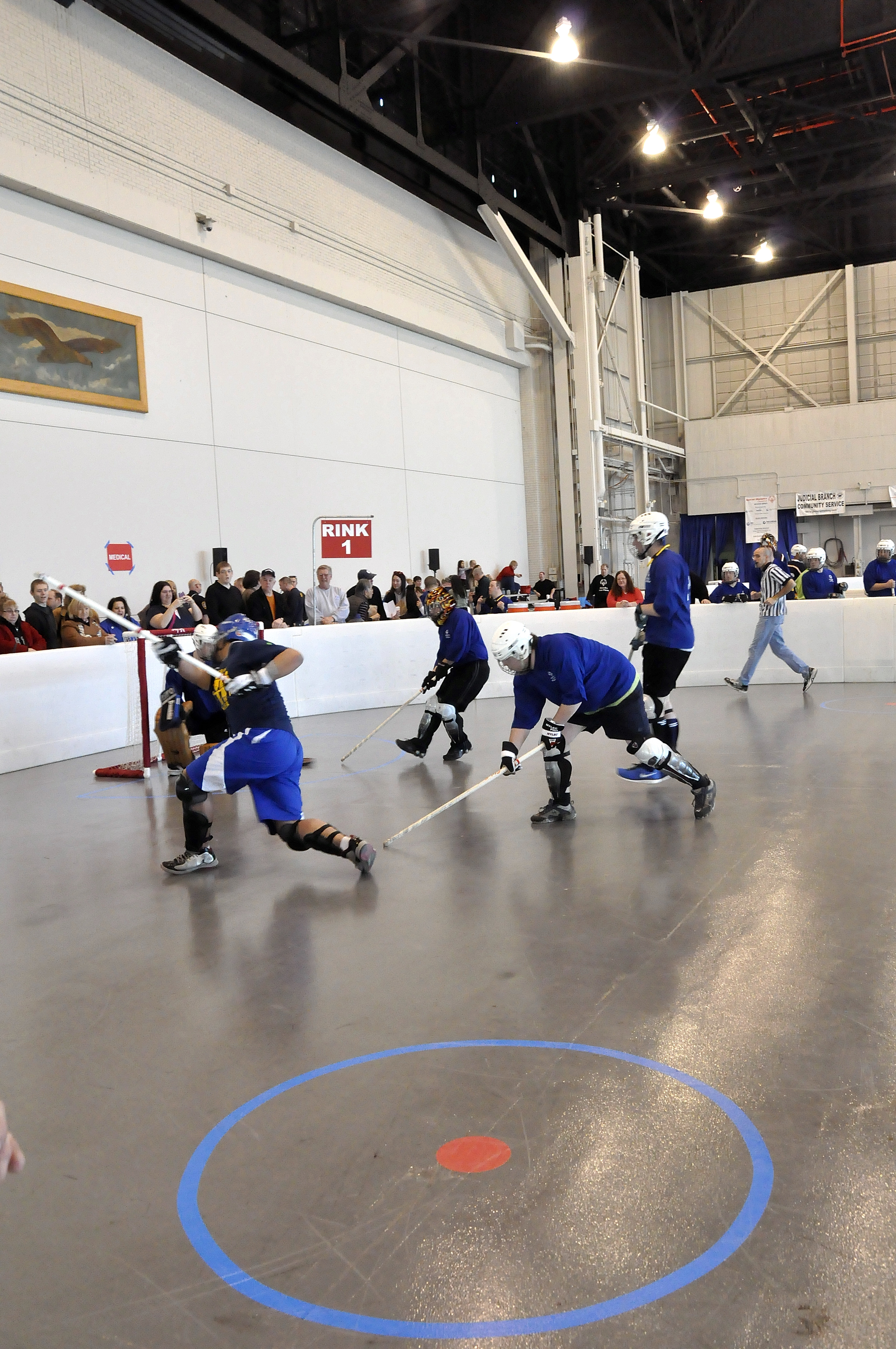
Photo from the 2014 Special Olympics Floor Hockey competition

The Special Olympics variant of floor hockey uses a wide disc with a hole in the middle and a blade-less stick. Floor hockey pucks are donut shaped felt pucks with a center hole of 10 cm (4 inches), a diameter of 20 cm (8 inches), a thickness of 2.5 cm (1inch) and a weight of 140 to 225 grams (5 to 8 ounces). Protective equipment is required. It is believed to have been derived from a much earlier floor hockey variant from early 20th century Canada whose rules were codified by Sam Jacks.

=== Roller games (wheeled skates) ===
There are two variants of floor hockey which use wheeled skates: quad hockey which is also known by other names like rink hockey, a sport with a resemblance more reminiscent of bandy and field hockey, and in-line hockey which is a wheeled variant of ice hockey.

==== In-line hockey ====
Inline hockey is a wheeled floor hockey variant derived from the ice sport of ice hockey.

==== Quad hockey ====
Quad hockey is a wheeled floor hockey variant also known by various names including roller hockey and rink hockey.

Roller hockey

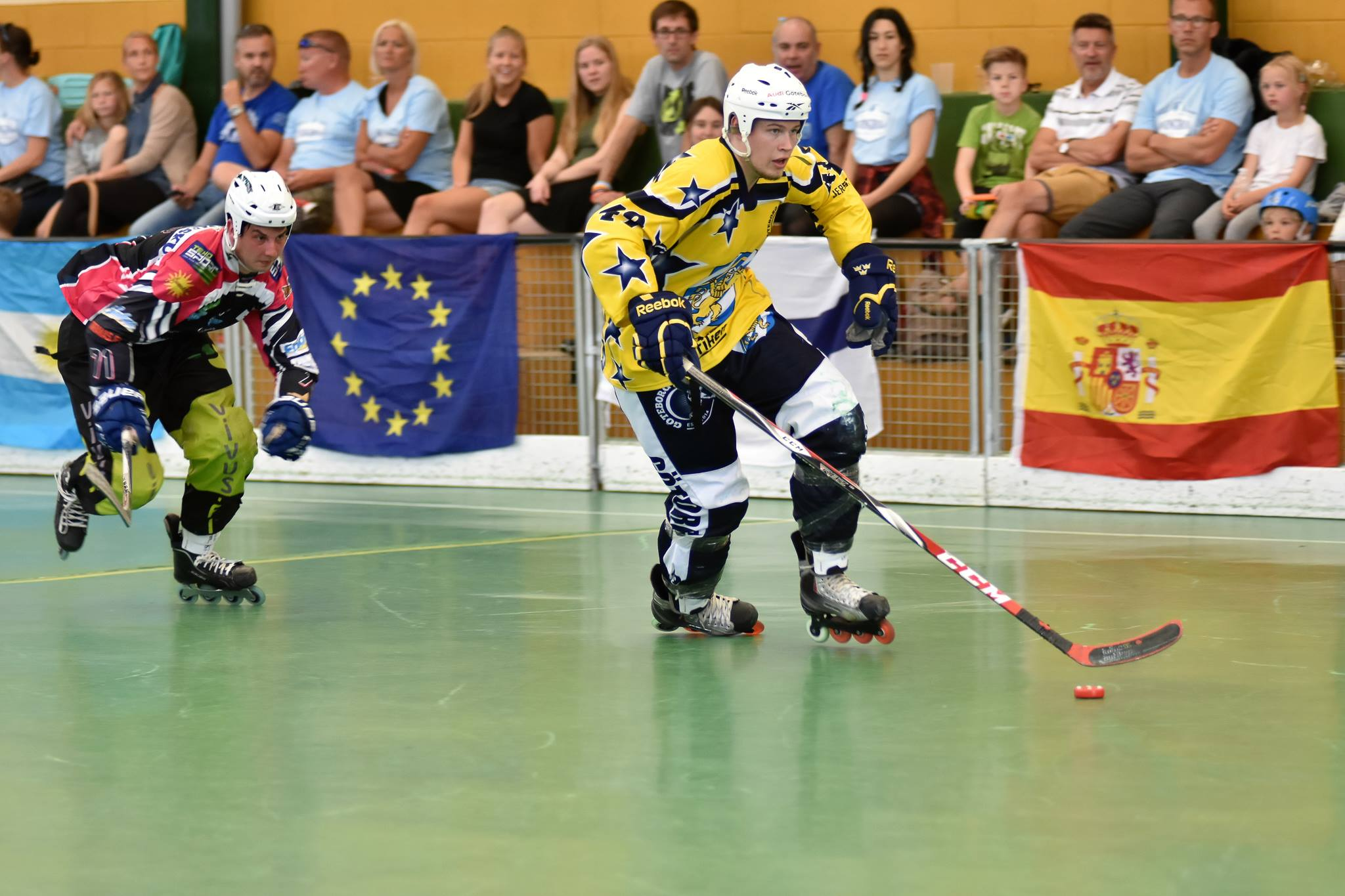
In-line hockey player

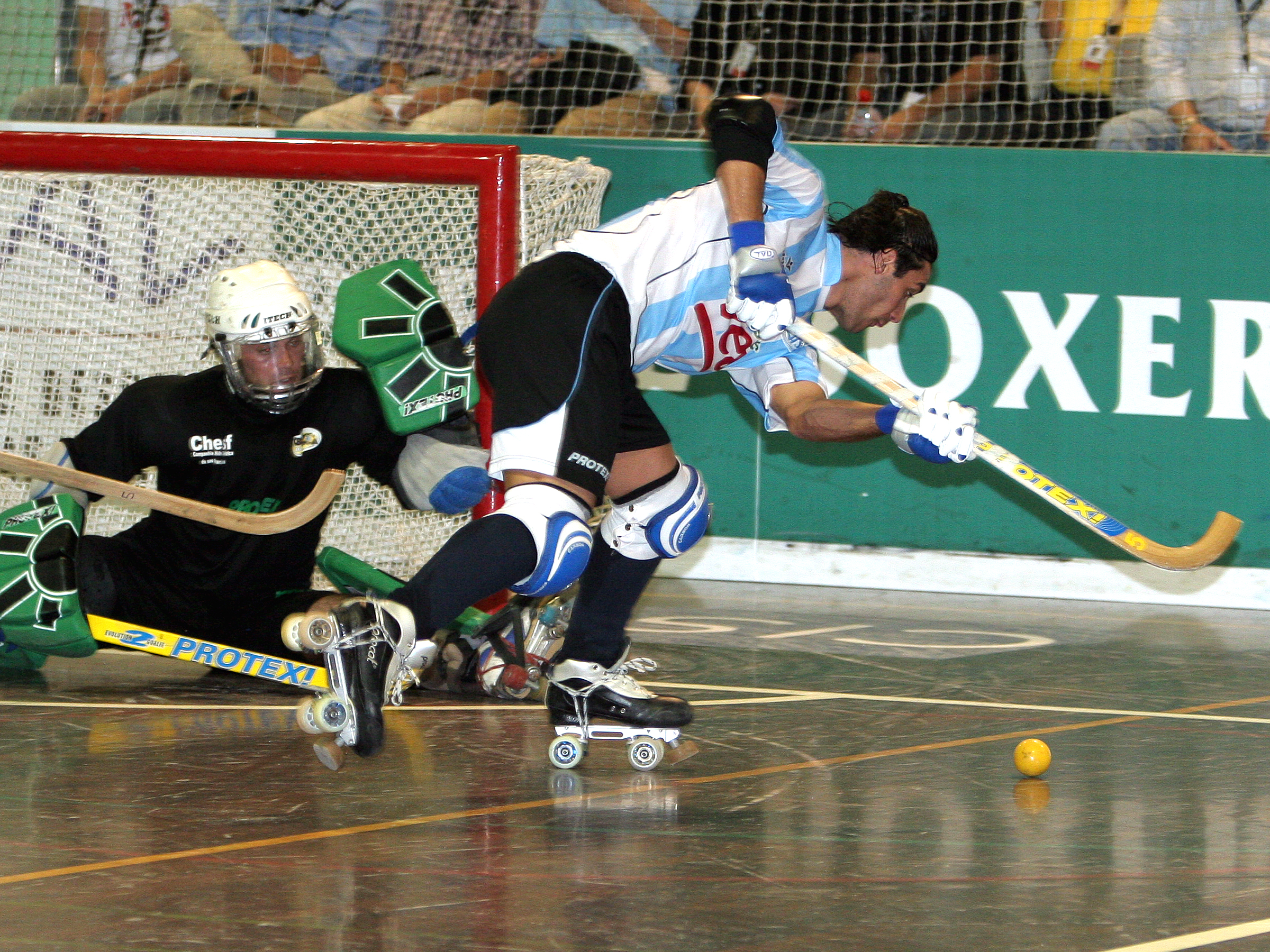
Quad hockey player

== Rules ==
Although there are different codes of floor hockey rules, there are some basic rules which are typically followed regardless of code, with the exception of gym ringette.

=== Start of play ===
Floor hockey games start with a face-off, in which a player from each team has an equal chance to gain possession. The face-off is also used to resume play after goals, and to start each period.

=== Scoring ===
A goal is scored when the entire puck or ball crosses the plane of the goal line, unless it is intentionally kicked in by the attacking team.

The team with the most goals at the end of the game is declared the winner. If the game is tied, the games usually proceed into golden goal period(s) in order to determine a winner. Overtime rules vary, but typically include extra time and/or penalty shootout.

=== Penalties ===
Penalties for illegal actions are enforced. A player committing a major infraction is required to sit out of the game for two minutes, resulting a power play, but a minor infraction may result in a free hit. Penalties are typically given for the following actions:

- Tripping – Using the body or stick to intentionally cause a player to fall
- Hooking – Using the curved end of the stick to impede a player's forward progress by pulling him or her back
- Slashing – Using the stick to hit an opposing player's body
- Interference – Using the body to move a player from his current position on the floor or preventing him from playing the ball or puck
- High Sticking – Allowing the curved end of the stick to come above your waist
- Pushing Down – Using the stick to push an opponent down
- Checking from behind – Hitting a player from behind
- Cross-checking – ramming opponent with stick using both hands
- Too many players on court - to be served by designated player
- Spearing – stabbing opponent with stick blade (game misconduct)
- Deliberate intent to injure opponents (game misconduct)

Due to the limited padding worn by players, body checking is typically disallowed in floor hockey games, although shoulder-to-shoulder checking is allowed.

== Common misconceptions ==
The term "floor hockey" has at times been incorrectly called ringette and vice versa. Ringette is not a floor sport, but an ice skating sport. Another common mistake is to confuse gym ringette with floor hockey. Though one of the two floor hockey variants which use a disc with a hole in the center was codified by the Canadian Sam Jacks in the 1930s, gym ringette should not be confused with floor hockey variants due to the fact gym ringette was designed in Canada in the late 20th century as the off-ice variant of the ice skating sport of ringette, a sport which was also created by Sam Jacks in Canada in the 1960s.

== See also ==
- Hockey
