= Vladimir Lopatin =

Soviet swimmer (born 1931)

Personal information
- Born: 1931

Sport
- Sport: Swimming

Vladimir Lopatin (born 1931) is a Soviet former swimmer. He competed in the men's 100 metre backstroke at the 1952 Summer Olympics.
