= Eurico Surgey =

Portuguese swimmer

Personal information
- Born: 23 October 1931 Lisbon, Portugal
- Died: 10 June 2018 (aged 86)

Sport
- Sport: Swimming

Eurico Surgey (23 October 1931 – 10 June 2018) was a Portuguese swimmer. He competed in the men's 100 metre backstroke at the 1952 Summer Olympics.
