= Tom Pettersen =

Norwegian swimmer

Personal information
- Born: 8 May 1935 Oslo, Norway
- Died: 9 February 1994 (aged 58) Oslo, Norway

Sport
- Sport: Swimming

Tom Pettersen (8 May 1935 – 9 February 1994) was a Norwegian swimmer. He competed in the men's 100 metre backstroke at the 1952 Summer Olympics.
