= Bijoy Barman =

Indian swimmer

Personal information
- Full name: Bijoy Kumar Barman
- Born: 1 December 1928

Sport
- Sport: Swimming
- Strokes: Backstroke

Bijoy Barman (born 1 December 1928) is an Indian former swimmer. He competed in the men's 100 metre backstroke and the water polo tournament at the 1952 Summer Olympics.
