= Helmut Koppelstätter =

Austrian swimmer

Personal information
- Born: 15 February 1930
- Died: May 1991

Sport
- Sport: Swimming

Helmut Koppelstätter (15 February 1930 – May 1991) was an Austrian backstroke swimmer. He competed in the men's 100 metre backstroke at the 1952 Summer Olympics.
