= Erkki Marttinen =

Finnish swimmer

Personal information
- Nationality: Finnish
- Born: 18 May 1926
- Died: 1 November 2004 (aged 78)

Sport
- Sport: Swimming

Erkki Marttinen (18 May 1926 – 1 November 2004) was a Finnish swimmer. He competed in the men's 100 metre backstroke at the 1952 Summer Olympics.
