= Hermann Gericke =

Swiss swimmer (1931–2026)

Personal information
- Born: 12 August 1931 Zürich, Switzerland
- Died: 6 August 2026 (aged 94)

Sport
- Sport: Swimming

Hermann Gericke (12 August 1931 – 6 August 2026) was a Swiss swimmer. He competed in the men's 100 metre backstroke at the 1952 Summer Olympics. Gericke died on 6 August 2026, at the age of 94.
