= Eastern Canadian Ringette Championships =

Canadian sports competition

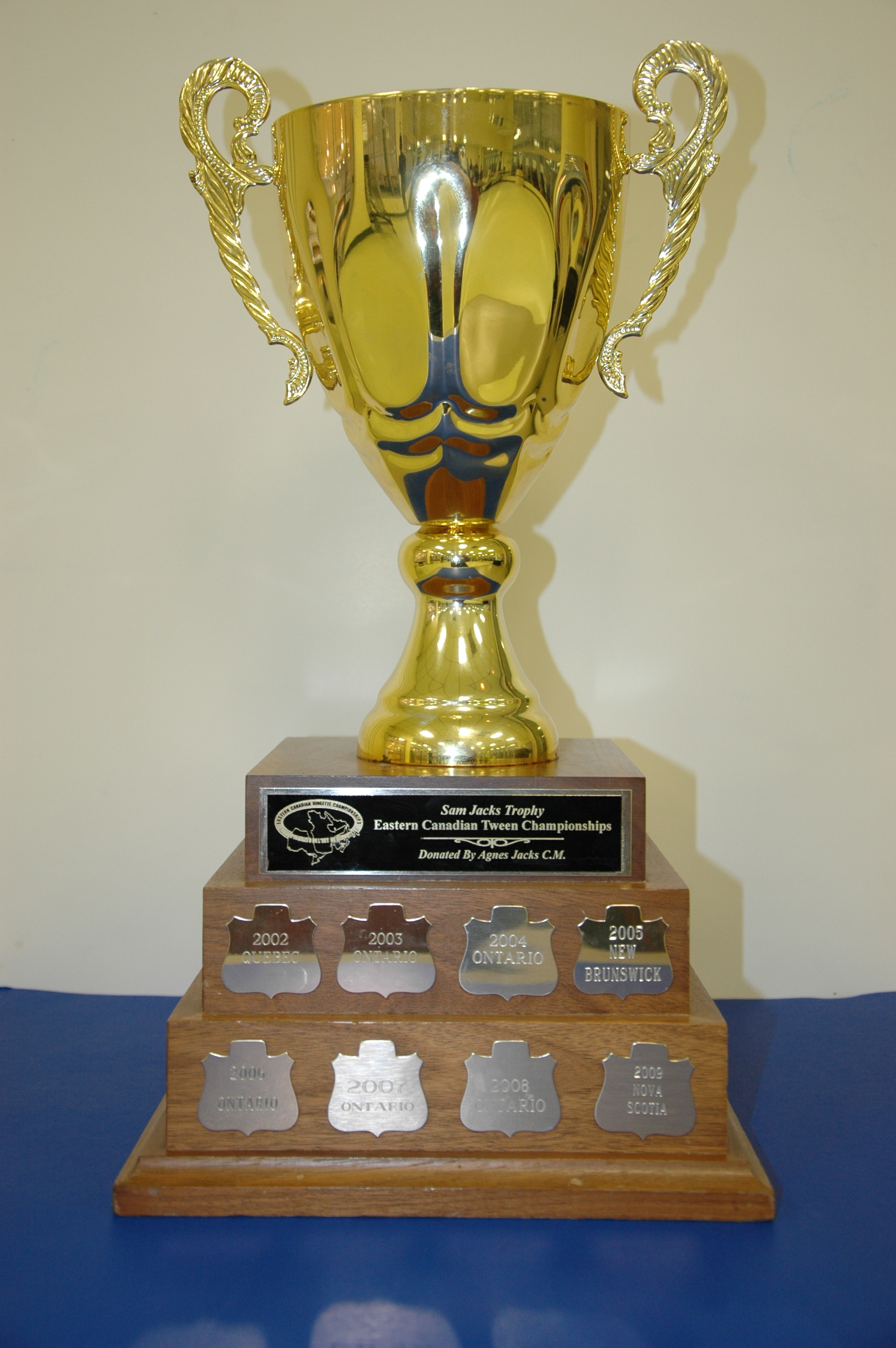
- The Sam Jacks Trophy; Eastern Canadian U14AA Championships; Donated by Agnes Jacks CM
- Status: Active
- Genre: Sports event
- Date: Varying
- Frequency: Annual
- Location: Various
- Country: Canada
- Inaugurated: 2002; 24 years ago

The Eastern Canadian Ringette Championships (ECRC) are competitions in the sport of ringette between provinces of eastern Canada. The inaugural year for the event was in 2002. The tournament was suspended for the 2020 and 2021 seasons due to the COVID-19 pandemic, and recommenced in 2022.

The championships are contested in four divisions: Under-14 A and AA (U14), Under-16 A (U16), Under-19 A (U19), and U18+ A (open), between the provinces of Nova Scotia, Prince Edward Island, New Brunswick, Quebec and Ontario.

== Venue ==
The Eastern Canadian Ringette Championships rotate locations between the five provinces of Ontario, Quebec, New Brunswick, Nova Scotia, and Prince Edward Island.

Eastern Canadian Ringette Championships hosts
Year	Province
2002	Quebec
2003	Nova Scotia
2004	Ontario
2005	New Brunswick
2006	Nova Scotia
2007	PEI
2008	Quebec
2009	Ontario
2010	New Brunswick
2011	PEI
2012	Quebec
2013	Nova Scotia
2014	Ontario
2015	New Brunswick
2016	PEI
2017	Quebec
2018	Nova Scotia
2019	Ontario
2020	New Brunswick (cancelled - COVID)
2021	PEI (cancelled - COVID)
2022	Nova Scotia
2023	New Brunswick
2024	PEI
2025	Quebec
2026	Ontario (tentative)
2027	Nova Scotia (tentative)
2028	New Brunswick (tentative)
2029	PEI (tentative)

== Champions by year and division ==
=== 2002 Host - Quebec ===
Division	Gold	Silver	Bronze
U14 AA	Quebec		
U16 A			
U19 A			
U18+ A			

=== 2003 Host - Nova Scotia ===
Division	Gold	Silver	Bronze
U14 AA	Ontario		
U16 A			
U19 A			
U18+ A			

=== 2004 Host - Ontario ===
Division	Gold	Silver	Bronze
U14 AA	Ontario		
U16 A			
U19 A			
U18+ A			

=== 2005 Host - New Brunswick ===
Division	Gold	Silver	Bronze
U14 AA	New Brunswick		
U16 A			
U19 A			
U18+ A			

=== 2006 Host - Nova Scotia ===
Division	Gold	Silver	Bronze
U14 AA	Ontario		
U16 A			
U19 A			
U18+ A			

=== 2007 Host - PEI ===
Division	Gold	Silver	Bronze
U14 AA	Ontario		
U16 A			
U19 A			
U18+ A			

=== 2008 Host - Quebec ===
Division	Gold	Silver	Bronze
U14 AA	Ontario		
U16 A			
U19 A			
U18+ A			

=== 2009 Host - Ontario ===
Division	Gold	Silver	Bronze
U14 AA	Nova Scotia		
U16 A			
U19 A			
U18+ A			

=== 2010 Host - New Brunswick ===
Division	Gold	Silver	Bronze
U14 AA	New Brunswick	Nova Scotia	Ontario - Guelph
U16 A			
U19 A			
U18+ A			

=== 2011 Host - Charlottetown, PEI ===
Division	Gold	Silver	Bronze
U14 AA	Ontario	New Brunswick	Quebec
U16 A	New Brunswick	Ontario	Nova Scotia
U19 A	Ontario	PEI	Quebec
U18+ A			

=== 2012 Host - Mascouche, Quebec ===
Division	Gold	Silver	Bronze
U14 AA	Ontario A-1	Ontario A-2	New Brunswick
U16 A	PEI	Quebec	Nova Scotia
U19 A	Ontario	Quebec	PEI
U18+ A	Ontario	Quebec	Quebec

=== 2013 Host - Halifax (Bedford), Nova Scotia ===
Division	Gold	Silver	Bronze
U14 AA	New Brunswick - NB1 Stingers	Quebec - QC2 Ste Marie de Beauce	Ontario - ON1 Ottawa
U16 A	Ontario - ON2 Kitchener	Ontario - ON1 Seaforth	Quebec - Repentigny
U19 A	Quebec - QC2 Ste Marie de Beauce	Quebec - QC1 Ste Hyacinthe	Ontario - Ottawa
U18+ A	Quebec - QC1 Boucherville	Ontario - Toronto	Quebec - QC2 Longueuil

=== 2014 Host - Mississauga, Ontario - Mississauga Ringette Association ===
Division	Gold	Silver	Bronze
U14 AA	Ontario - London Lynx	New Brunswick - Hot Shots	Quebec - 4-Cités
U16 A	Ontario - Mitchell Stingers	Quebec - Intrépides	PEI - Wave
U19 A	Ontario - St. Marys Snipers	Quebec - Boucherville	Quebec - 4-Cités
U18+ A	Quebec - Boucherville	Ontario - Toronto	Nova Scotia

=== 2015 Host - New Brunswick - ===
Division	Gold	Silver	Bronze
U14 AA	New Brunswick - Hot Shots	New Brunswick - Codiac Stingers	Ontario - Richmond Hill Lightning
U16 A	Nova Scotia - Halifax Hurricanes	Ontario - Timmins Tornadoes	PEI
U19 A	Ontario - Exeter-Seaforth Explosion	PEI	New Brunswick
U18+ A	Ontario - Toronto	Quebec - Lévis	Nova Scotia

=== 2016 Host - Charlottetown, PEI ===
Division	Gold	Silver	Bronze
U14 AA	New Brunswick - Codiac Stingers	Ontario - Mississauga Mustangs	Quebec - QC2 - Roussillon
U16 A	Nova Scotia - NS1	Ontario - Guelph Predators	Quebec - QC1 - St-Eustache
U19 A	Ontario - ON1	Ontario - ON2	PEI - PEI1
U18+ A	Ontario - Waterloo Wildfire Dawson	Quebec - Montreal Nord	Nova Scotia

=== 2017 Host - Pierrefonds, Quebec ===
Division	Gold	Silver	Bronze
U14 AA	New Brunswick - Codiac Stingers	Ontario - ON1 - Team Ontario (Waterloo U14AA)	Quebec - QC1 - Colibris Lévis
U16 A	PEI - PEI Wave	Quebec - QC1 - St-Eustache	Nova Scotia - NS
U19 A	Ontario - Forrest	Ontario - Team Ontario	Quebec - Gatineau
U18+ A	Ontario - Team Ontario (Toronto)	Quebec - Gatineau	Quebec - Lévis

=== 2018 Host - Halifax, Nova Scotia ===
Division	Gold	Silver	Bronze
U14 A	New Brunswick - Codiac Stingers	Ontario - ON2 - Waterloo Wildfire	New Brunswick - Hot Shots
U16 A	New Brunswick - NB1 - Southeast Fusion	Nova Scotia - NS1 - Nova Central	Nova Scotia - NS Host - Harbour City Lakers
U19 A	Ontario - ON1 - Timmins Tornadoes	Nova Scotia - NS	Québec - Avalanches de Sainte-Julie
U18+ A	Ontario - ON1	Nova Scotia - NS	Québec - BKRA

=== 2019 Host - Oshawa, Ontario ===
Division	Gold	Silver	Bronze
U14 A	New Brunswick - Hot Shots	Québec - Avalanches de Sainte-Julie	New Brunswick - Codiac Stingers
U16 A	New Brunswick - SouthEast Fusion	Ontario - Metcalfe Hornets	Québec - Avalanches de Sainte-Julie
U19 A	Québec - ATTAK de Saint-Eustache	New Brunswick	Ontario

=== 2022 Host - Halifax, Nova Scotia ===
Division	Gold	Silver	Bronze
U14 AA	New Brunswick 2 - Team Brine	PEI Wave	New Brunswick 1 - Team Clinch
U16 A	New Brunswick	Ontario - Forest Extreme	Québec - Colibris de Lévis
U19 A	Québec - Avalanches de Ste-Julie	Prince Edward Island	New Brunswick
U18+ A	New Brunswick	Québec - Longueuil	Nova Scotia

=== 2023 Host - Dieppe, New Brunswick ===
Division	Gold	Silver	Bronze
U14 AA	New Brunswick 1 - Team Doiron	PEI Wave	Quebec - Faucons de Longueuil
U16 A	New Brunswick	Prince Edward Island	Ontario - Forest Xtreme
U19 A	Québec - VDR	Prince Edward Island	New Brunswick
U18+ A	New Brunswick	Québec - Montreal Nord	Ontario

=== 2024 Host - Charlottetown, PEI ===
Division	Gold	Silver	Bronze
U14 AA	PEI Wave	Ontario - Nepean Ravens	Quebec 1 - Valkyries de Ste-Marie
U16 A	Quebec - Rockets de Roussillon	New Brunswick	Ontario - Forest Xtreme
U19 A	Ontario - West Ottawa	New Brunswick	Quebec - Rafales de Quebec
U18+ A	Ontario	New Brunswick	Quebec - Montreal Nord

=== 2025 Host - Pierrefonds, QC ===
Division	Gold	Silver	Bronze
U14 AA	Quebec 1 - Colibris de Levis	PEI Wave	New Brunswick 1 - Codiac Cyclones
U16 A	New Brunswick	PEI Edge	Quebec 2 - Orbite de Boucherville
U19 A	New Brunswick	Quebec 2 - VDR	Ontario - GCRA
U18+ A	New Brunswick	Quebec 1 - Montreal Nord	Ontario
