= Lin Meiring =

South African swimmer

Personal information
- Nationality: South African
- Born: 22 October 1933 Pietermaritzburg, South Africa
- Died: 6 February 2022 (aged 88) Oklahoma City, Oklahoma, United States

Sport
- Sport: Swimming
- Strokes: Backstroke

Nicolaas Lingen Meiring (22 October 1933 – 6 February 2022) was a South African swimmer. He competed in the men's 100 metre backstroke at the 1952 Summer Olympics. Meiring finished fourth in the 1954 British Empire and Commonwealth Games 110 yards backstroke.
