= Swimming at the 1951 Pan American Games – Men's 100 metre backstroke =

Men's 100 metre backstroke at the 1951 Pan American Games
- Venue: -
- Dates: March 5 (preliminaries and finals)

Medalists
| Gold medal | Allen Stack | United States |
| Silver medal | Pedro Galvão | Argentina |
| Bronze medal | Burwell Jones | United States |

The men's 100 metre backstroke competition of the swimming events at the 1951 Pan American Games took place on the 5th March.

The race consisted of two lengths of the pool, all in backstroke.

== Results ==
All times are in minutes and seconds.

| KEY: | q | Fastest non-qualifiers | Q | Qualified | GR | Games record | NR | National record | PB | Personal best | SB | Seasonal best |

=== Final ===
The final was held on March 5.

| Rank | Name | Nationality | Time | Notes |
|---|---|---|---|---|
| 1st place, gold medalist(s) | Allen Stack | United States | 1:08.0 | |
| 2nd place, silver medalist(s) | Pedro Galvão | Argentina | 1:08.3 | |
| 3rd place, bronze medalist(s) | Burwell Jones | United States | 1:09.8 | |
| 4 | Clementi Mejas | Chile | - | |
| 5 | Ilo da Fonseca | Brazil | - | |
| 6 | Fernando Pavan | Brazil | - | |
| 7 | - | - | - | |
| 8 | - | - | - | |
