= Sam Jacks =

Canadian inventor, Canadian World War II soldier

Samuel Perry Jacks
- Born: Samuel Perry Jacks; April 23, 1915. Glasgow, Scotland
- Died: May 14, 1975 (aged 60); Glasgow, Scotland
- Known for: Inventing floor hockey and ringette

Samuel Perry Jacks (April 23, 1915 – May 14, 1975) more commonly known as, "Sam Jacks," was a Canadian soldier in World War II, inventor, military and civic recreation director, sports coach, creator of the Canadian sport of ringette, originally designed for girls, and the creator and codifier of the first set of rules for floor hockey in 1936. He was born in Glasgow, Scotland, United Kingdom, in 1915 and became a Canadian citizen after his parents had immigrated to Canada in 1920. Jacks died from cancer in 1975, at the age of 60.

Among his many achievements and honours was his posthumous induction into the Canadian Sports Hall of Fame in 2007. He was also posthumously inducted into the North Bay Sports Hall of Fame on February 27, 1982. He was inducted into the Ringette Canada Hall of Fame in 1998 during the 10th annual Canadian Ringette Championships.

Jacks is best known for inventing the sport of ringette, although he died before it gained popularity. For the World Ringette Championships, the Sam Jacks Trophy, which is given to the winning team in the senior division of what is customarily a three-game series between Team Canada and Team Finland known as the "Sam Jacks Series," is the highest international trophy in the sport and is named in his honour. In a similar fashion, Ringette Canada honoured Jacks by naming its "Belle" division championship trophy for the Canadian Ringette Championships in his honour, the "Sam Jacks Memorial Trophy." Today the "Belle" division is known as the Under-19 (U19) division. The Sam Jacks Trophy for the Under-14 AA (U14AA) winners of the Eastern Canadian Ringette Championships is named after him as well, a trophy that was donated by his wife, Agnes Jacks CM.

At the time of his death in 1975, Jacks had reportedly been working on another game for girls during his spare time, which he called "Net Ball." It is possible that the game was related to or actually was the organized sport of netball, which had been introduced to Canada during the early 1960s.

== Biography ==
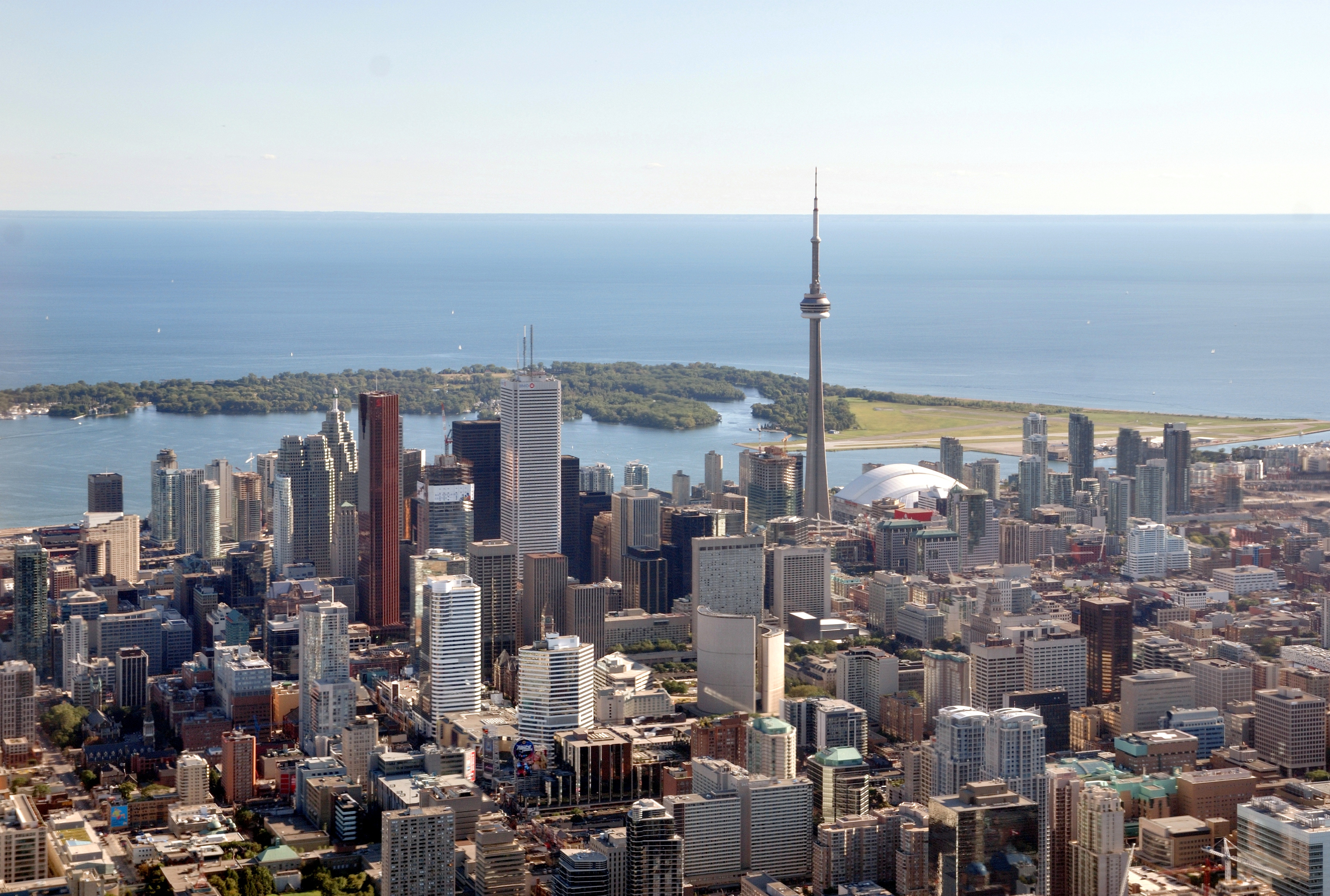
Toronto, Canada, where Jacks lived in 1920 after his parents immigrated from Glasgow, Scotland in the United Kingdom

Samuel Perry Jacks was born April 23, 1915, in Glasgow, Scotland in the United Kingdom, less than a year after the outbreak of World War I in July 1914. The war would end in November 1918. In 1920, when Jacks was roughly five years old, he and his family moved from Scotland, immigrated to Canada, and settled in Toronto.

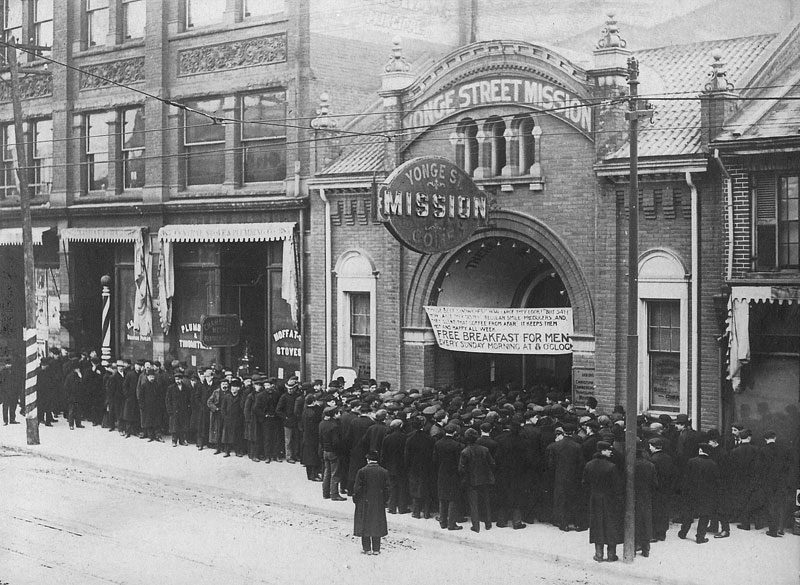
Food line at the Yonge Street Mission in Toronto, Canada, in the 1930s during the Great Depression

In 1935, Jacks was 20 when he began his professional career in recreation becoming the Assistant Physical Director at the Toronto West End YMCA (Young Men's Christian Association). The West End YMCA moved to its present West End branch at College Street and Dovercourt Road in 1912, now in Toronto. Jacks would hold that position until 1940, a year after the outbreak of World War II in 1939.

In 1936, while in his early twenties and a year after he had begun his professional career at the YMCA, he invented and codified the first set of rules for the first organized version of floor hockey. The game was designed for youths to play in a gym and was a variant of hockey that used a straight stick and a felt disk with a hole in the middle. The achievement was later recognized by the Youth Branch of the United Nations.

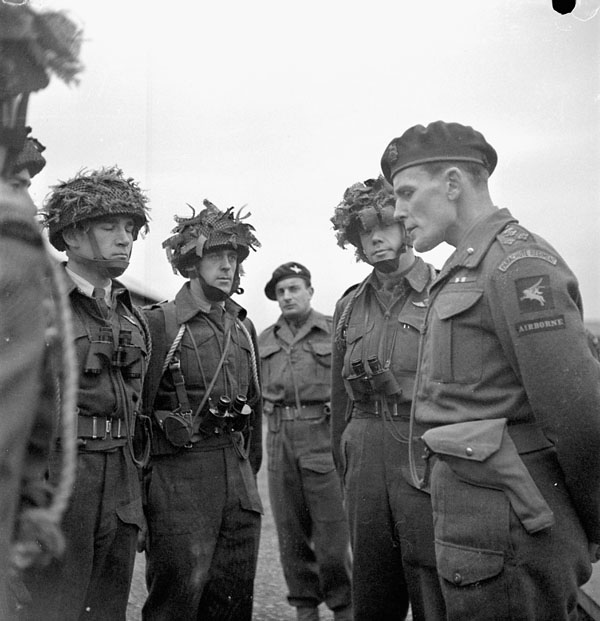
Brigadier James Hill (right), Commander of the 3rd Parachute Brigade, briefs officers of the 1st Canadian Parachute Battalion, in England, December 6, 1943.

After the outbreak of World War II, Jacks enlisted and became a member of the Canadian Armed Forces of the British Empire serving from 1940 to 1945. During his time with the Canadian military he served with the #1 Motor Transport Volunteer Reserve Depot, 1st Light Anti-Aircraft Regiment, Chemical Warfare School, and served with the 1st Canadian Parachute Battalion in charge of sports for South West England. On September 30, 1945, the 1st Canadian Parachute Battalion was officially disbanded after it had returned to Canada and hostilities in Europe had ceased.

While stationed in England during World War II, Jacks met Agnes MacKrell (1924–2005) at a dance while he was a recreation director in the army. Agnes Jacks CM was born in Scotland and her family moved to London, England, just before the outbreak of World War II. Agnes had been working at a munitions factory in England when she and Sam met toward the end of the war while Sam was finishing six years of having served with the Canadian Armed Forces. The couple then married and Agnes automatically became a Canadian citizen. After the war the couple arrived in Halifax, Nova Scotia, then moved to Toronto, Canada with their first son, Barry. They later had two more sons in Canada, Bruce and Brian. Agnes was a war bride. After Sam died in 1975, Agnes became an important lifelong and committed ambassador for the sport of ringette, which Sam had created in 1963. In 1996 she was inducted into the Ringette Canada Hall of Fame as a "Builder" for her commitment and ambassadorship for the sport of ringette. On Saturday, October 26, 2002, she was inducted as a member of the Order of Canada and was also recognized with the Queen Elizabeth II Golden Jubilee Medal for her contributions to women's sport. For a time she served as the Honorary President of the International Ringette Federation. She died of heart failure on April 1, 2005, at the North Bay General Hospital at the age of 81.

In 1946, Jacks returned to the West End YMCA in Toronto to continue his professional career. Among his numerous duties part of his time was spent working with postwar juvenile "gangs." He also created the Toronto Boy's Club and became its first president. In 1947, Jacks became the head coach of the Canadian Floor Hockey Team, which competed in the AAU Junior Olympic Games (Amateur Athletic Union) in the United States. The Canadian team finished in third place. Jacks also coached a AAU Junior Olympic Games track and field team in 1947 and won the trophy for third place.

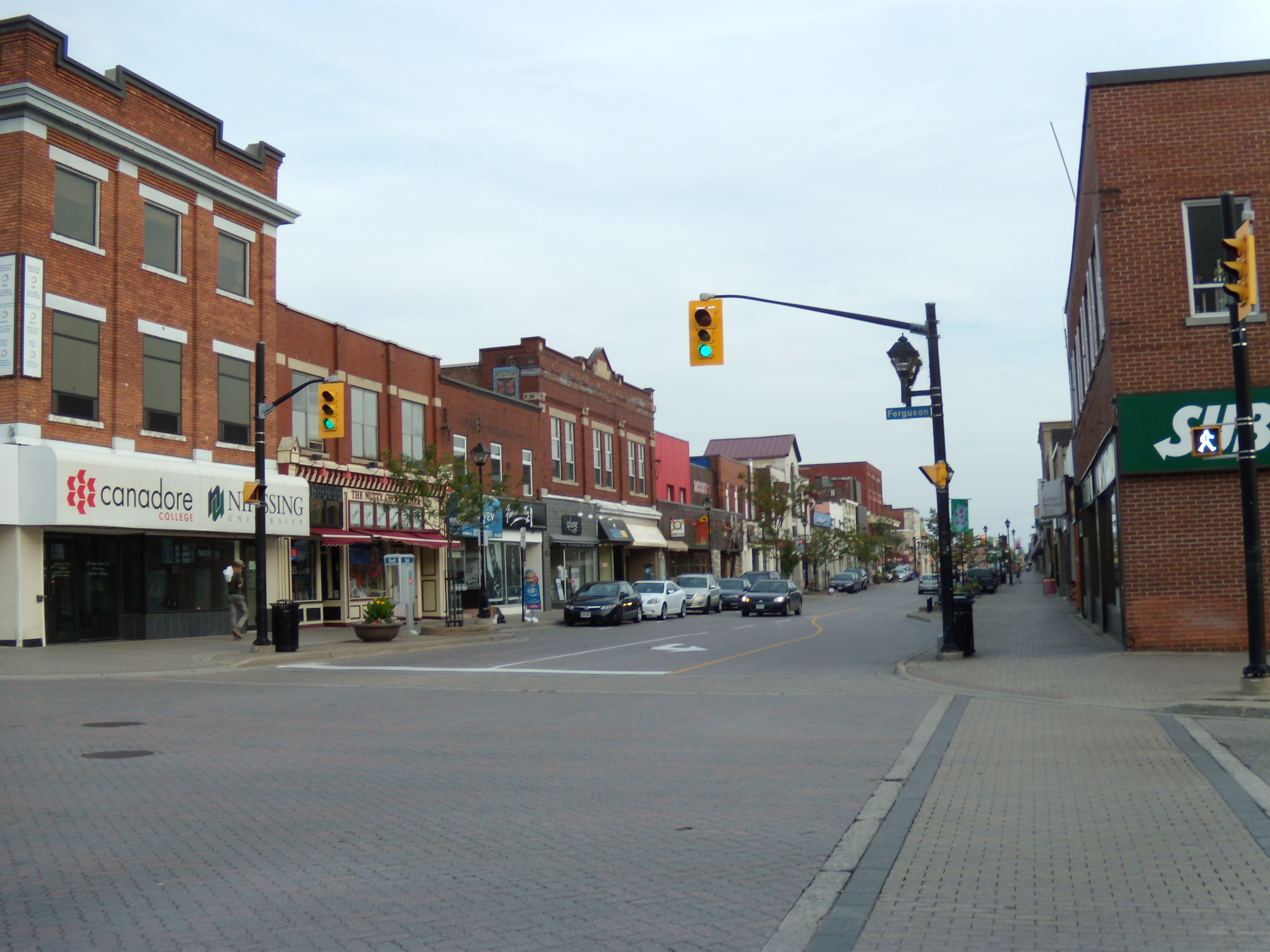
A contemporary view of a street in North Bay, Ontario, Canada, where Sam Jacks moved in 1948

In 1948, Jacks, a resident of West Ferris, Ontario, became the first Director of Parks and Recreation for the city of North Bay, Ontario, in Northern Ontario. After moving to the city and accepting the position he then became a member of the Northern Ontario Recreation Directors Association (NORDA). Soon after he played an important role in developing the first Northern Ontario Playground Hockey Association (NOPHA), an organization whose goal was to help inspire youth to play ice hockey on outdoor rinks. In 1963 he created the Society of Directors of Municipal Recreation of Ontario (SDMRO). He served as its first President and remained in the position for two consecutive terms (1963–1964).

By 1963, Jacks was serving as the municipal recreation director of North Bay, had become a member of the Northern Ontario Recreation Directors Association (NORDA) and was the president of the Society of Directors of Municipal Recreation of Ontario (SDMRO). That same year, Jacks created a winter team sport for girls, called ringette, which involved ice skating.(Video on YouTube) Critical to the development of the new sport, Red McCarthy, the director of recreation in Espanola, Ontario, who was a member of NORDA and developed the sport's first set of rules after volunteering to help experiment with Jacks's basic rules. Most of the initial rules set out by McCarthy are still part of ringette. Today ringette is one among only four ice skating team sports in existence worldwide, with bandy, ice hockey, and rinkball being the other three. However, ringette is the only one of the four winter sports in which the best athletes are female, rather than male.

In Ontario, Jacks was awarded "The Citation for Outstanding Contribution and Dedication to Recreation," one of the highest honours of the Society of Directors of Municipal Recreation of Ontario. The honour was presented to him personally by John Robarts, the 17th Premier of Ontario.

== Ringette ==
While living in West Ferris in 1963 Jacks became responsible for his most well known achievement, his invention of the sport of ringette. Jacks had reportedly worked for two years to develop a presentation for the sport. His wife, Agnes Jacks. stated, "I must make one point clear, this was not part of his job, this was his own interest on his own time."

Jacks was the founder of the Society of Directors of Municipal Recreation of Ontario (SDMRO) and was serving as its first President in 1963 when he presented his proposal for a new winter team sport for girls to the Northern Ontario Recreation Directors Association (NORDA). Mirl Arthur "Red" McCarthy, the director of recreation in Espanola, Ontario. and a member of NORDA then volunteered to further develop them.

Jacks had a drawing with diagonal lines on an ice surface and said the game should be feminine and not rough. He even suggested a three-foot line around the boards which could be a buffer zone, where no body contact would take place. "I then volunteered to go back to Espanola and experiment with the idea," says McCarthy. "I was also the arena manager back then and had access (sic) to ice time...

— "The origins of ringette: Espanola's McCarthy developed the game", Sudbury Star, 1989

The sport of ringette was created to both address and remedy two ongoing problems. The first was the observation and criticism regarding the tendency by those organizing, developing, and administering recreation programs to place most of their time, resources, and focus on running sports programs aimed at the male population to the exclusion of the female population, a problem that had concerned Jacks for some time. The second was to address additional criticism that almost immediately affected the newly-created SDMRO, which pointed out the tendency for sports programs to be largely male-oriented. Meanwhile, it was pointed out by the SDMRO that while programming for girls had been implemented and opportunities for girls existed, there had been a continual lack of success in Ontario in regards to gaining and maintaining participation by girls in winter sports. In Ontario and the rest of North America, only two winter-based team sports programs were available to girls at the time: girls' broomball and girls' ice hockey. However, only ice hockey involved ice skating. Both organized sports programs for girls already existed and were being administered in Ontario, but neither sport had proved successful, and both failed to generate and maintain interest among the female population.

Jacks's idea to remedy the situation was to try to create or discover a new winter team sport just for the girls themselves. The new team sport had to help attract girls who had little to do in winter months, be accessible to as many girls as possible (including girls whose families could not afford figure skating), and attractive to girls who simply were not otherwise inclined. Jacks then introduced his idea for ringette to NORDA and the SDMRO. Initially, the team sport was conceptualized as a type of sport that could be played on either a court or in a gymnasium, but Jacks soon decided to make it a team sport that involved ice skating since girls had never had their own sport of that type.

Sam and Agnes Jacks had no daughters, and their three sons were talented ice hockey players, with two of them eventually winning scholarships at renowned schools, but Sam and Agnes still recognized the needs and concerns of girls, and Sam was never deterred from creating a sport just for the girls themselves:

"Our sons were tremendous hockey players, but Sam could see a drastic need for a game for girls on ice on skates; a team sport. That was the basis for his whole vision. He visualized the whole thing for ringette right up to part of the Olympics some day."

— "Ringette marks fruition of a dream", Winnipeg Free Press, Sunday, April 17, 1988

The Northern Ontario town of Espanola is considered "The Home of Ringette" since its first official rules were drafted there by Red McCarthy, but the Northern Ontario city of North Bay is considered the "Birthplace of Ringette" since Jacks was working there when he first developed the sport as a concept. Both Sam Jacks and Red McCarthy are credited as the sport's founders. Despite the historical differences, today the title of "birthplace of ringette" is often shared by both cities.

To date, with the exception of the artistic sport of synchronized skating, ringette remains the only winter team sport to have been exclusively developed for and around the female physique and to be driven by a female athlete demographic.

== Death ==
Jacks died from cancer on May 14, 1975, at the age of 60. His wife, Agnes (MacKrell) Jacks, died of heart failure on April 1, 2005, at the North Bay General Hospital. She was 81.

== Honours ==
- Head coach, (1947) AAU Junior Olympic Floor Hockey Team, which competed in the United States and finished third.
- Coach, AAU Junior Olympic Games track and field team (1947), who won the third-place trophy.
- Founder of the Society of Directors of Municipal Recreation of Ontario (SDMRO).
- President of the Society of Directors of Municipal Recreation of Ontario (1963 and 1964).
- "The Citation for Outstanding Contribution and Dedication to Recreation" was one of the highest honours of the Society of Directors of Municipal Recreation of Ontario. It was presented to him by Ontario Premier John Robarts.
- Ontario Achievement Award (1973) for his years of contribution to the field of Fitness and Amateur Sport.
- Induction into the Ontario Ringette Association Hall of Fame (1974) in recognition for creating and developing the sport of Ringette. The organization is now called "Ringette Ontario."
- Induction into the North Bay Hall of Fame, February 27, 1982.
- Ringette Canada Hall of Fame, (1988). He was the organization's first person to be honoured and inducted.
- Induction into Canada's Sports Hall of Fame (2007).

== Gallery ==
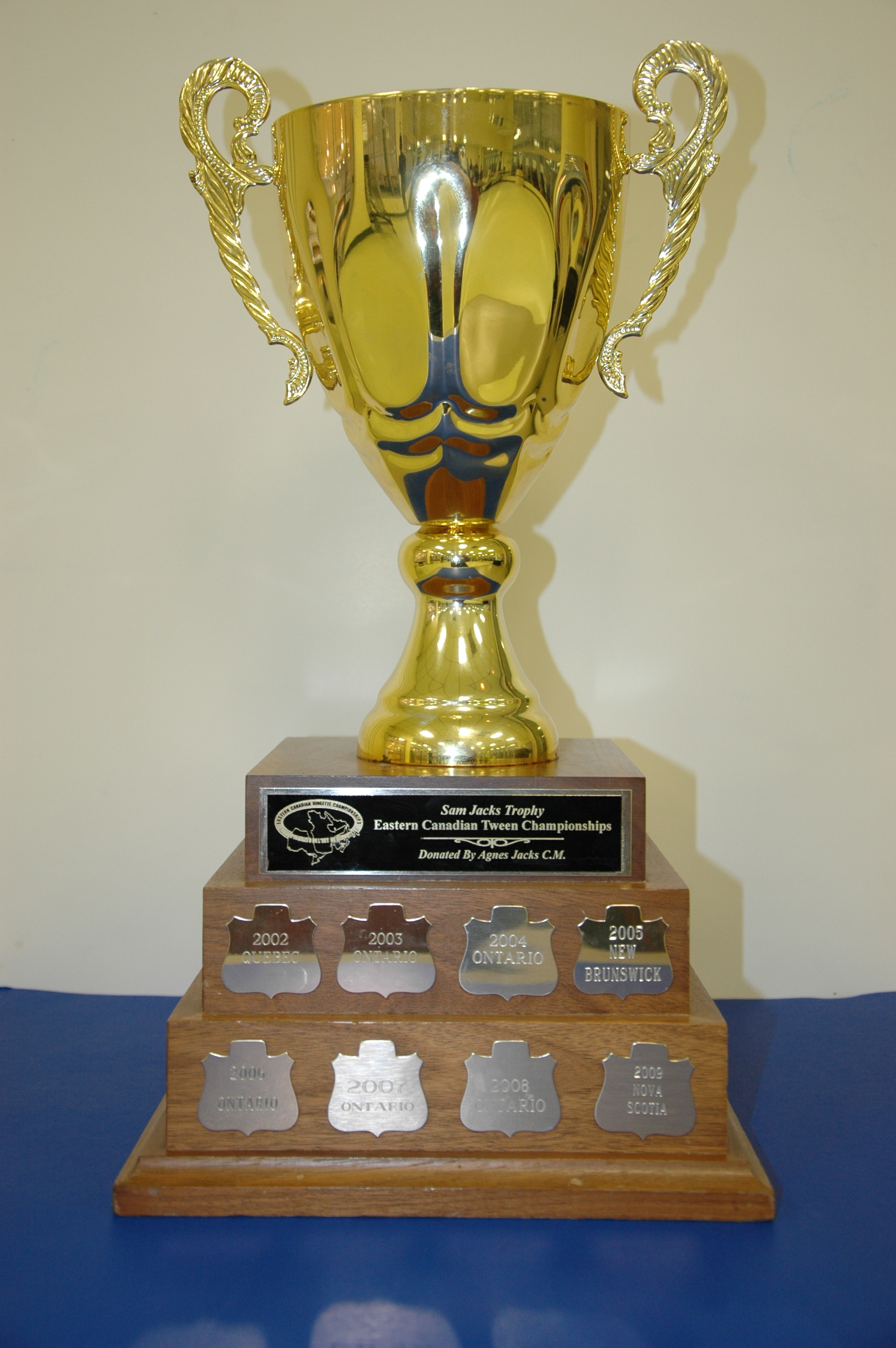
Sam Jacks Trophy: Eastern Canadian Ringette Championships, U14AA

== See also ==
- Ringette
- Red McCarthy
- Ringette in Canada
- National Ringette League
- World Ringette Championships

== Sources ==
- Collins, Kenneth Stewart (2004). The Ring Starts Here: An Illustrated History of Ringette.
- Hall, Margaret Ann (2016). The Girl and the Game: A History of Women's Sport in Canada. University of Toronto Press.
- Hall, Margaret Ann; Pfister, Gertrud. Honoring the Legacy: Fifty Years of the International Association of Physical Education and Sport for Girls and Women.
- Emerson, Kyler (7 July 2025). "B.C.'s birthplace for ringette". Aldergrove Star. Black Press Media.
