= Pedro Galvão =

Argentine swimmer

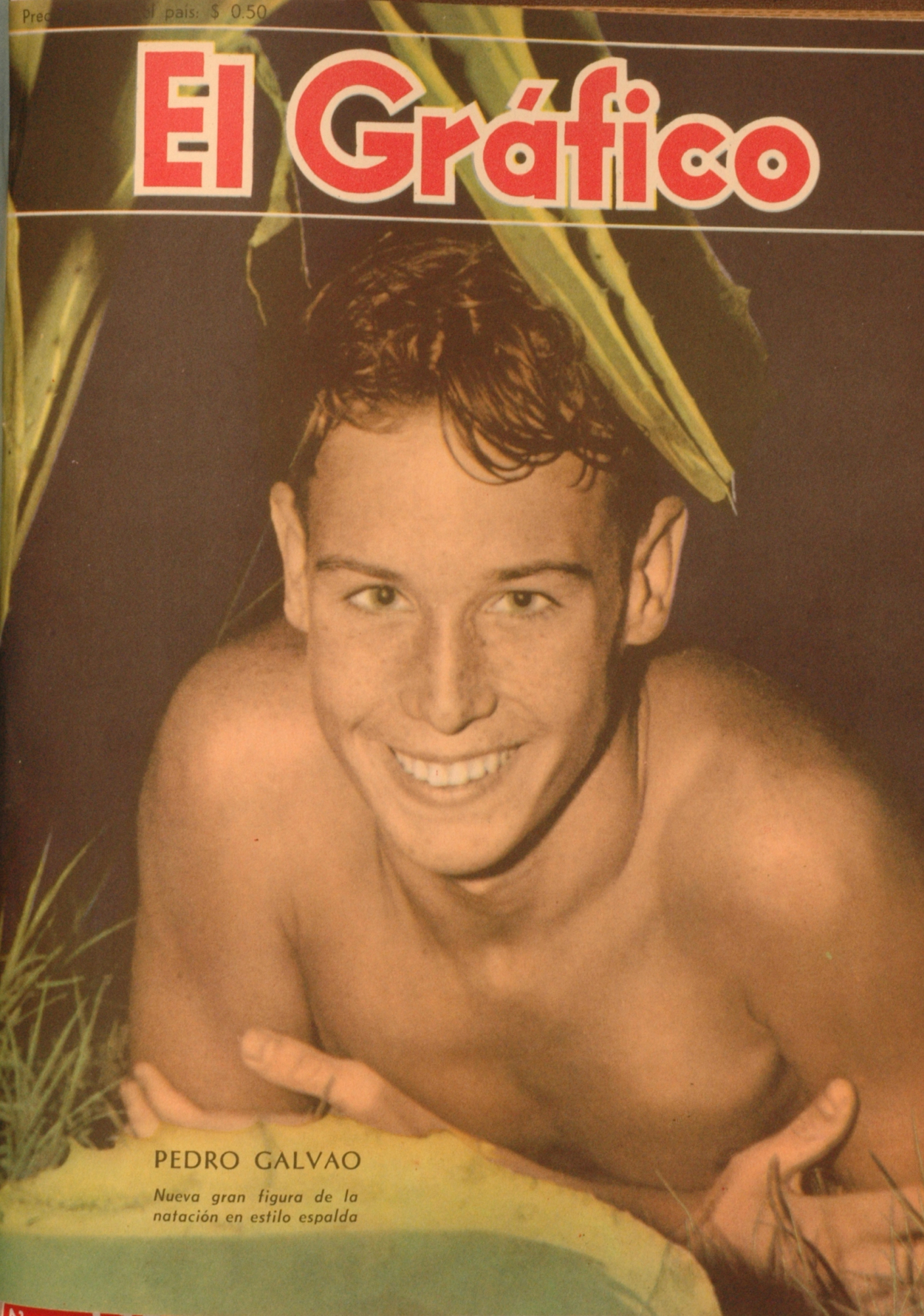
- Galvão on 1950 cover of El Gráfico

Personal information
- Born: 14 June 1934 (age 92) Buenos Aires, Argentina

Sport
- Sport: Swimming
Medal record
Men's swimming
Representing Argentina
Pan American Games
Silver medal – second place	1951 Buenos Aires	100 m backstroke
Silver medal – second place	1951 Buenos Aires	3×100 m medley
Silver medal – second place	1955 Mexico City	100 m backstroke
Silver medal – second place	1955 Mexico City	4×200 m freestyle
Silver medal – second place	1955 Mexico City	4×100 m medley
Bronze medal – third place	1951 Buenos Aires	4×200 m freestyle

Pedro Galvão (born 14 June 1934) is an Argentine former swimmer. He competed in two events at the 1952 Summer Olympics and the 100 meter backstroke at the 1951 Pan American games.
