= Ilo da Fonseca =

Brazilian swimmer (born 1930)

Personal information
- Full name: Ilo Monteiro da Fonseca
- Born: July 18, 1930 (age 95) Rio de Janeiro, Brazil

Sport
- Sport: Swimming
- Strokes: Backstroke
Medal record
Men's swimming
Representing Brazil

Ilo Monteiro da Fonseca (born July 18, 1930) is a former Olympic backstroke swimmer from Brazil, who participated in two Summer Olympics for his native country.

== Biography ==
Fonesca started swimming at the age of nine and turned professional. His club was Botafogo.

At the 1948 Summer Olympics in London, he swam the 100-metre backstroke, not reaching the finals. At the inaugural Pan American Games in 1951, in Buenos Aires, Argentina, he finished 5th in the 100-metre backstroke. At the 1952 Summer Olympics in Helsinki, he swam the 100-metre backstroke, not reaching the finals.

On 2011, Ilo was the South American record holder of the 50-metre freestyle in his age group.
