= AAU Junior Olympic Games =

Annual competition for multiple sports

The AAU Junior Olympic Games are the pinnacle competitions held annually by the US Amateur Athletic Union.

== Overview ==
The AAU Junior Olympic Games are known as the largest national multi-sport event for youth in the United States. It has become the showcase event of the AAU Sports Program. Recent hosts include Des Moines, Iowa; Greensboro, North Carolina; Hampton Roads, Virginia; Houston, Texas; and Detroit, Michigan in 2017.

The AAU is one of the largest, non-profit, volunteer sports organizations in the country. As a multi-sport organization, AAU is dedicated exclusively to the promotion and development of amateur sports and physical fitness programs. The AAU philosophy of “Sports for All, Forever” is shared by over 500,000 members and 60,000 volunteers nationwide. Over 34 sports are offered in the 57 AAU Districts. Programs offered by the AAU include AAU Sports Program, AAU Junior Olympic Games, AAU James E. Sullivan Memorial Award, and the AAU Complete Athlete Program.

The AAU was founded in 1888 to establish standards and uniformity in amateur sports. During its early years, the AAU served as a leader in international sports representing the United States in the international sports federations. The AAU worked closely with the Olympic movement to prepare athletes for the Olympic Games. After the Amateur Sports Act of 1978 and the establishment of the United States Olympic Committee, the AAU has focused its efforts on providing sports programs for participants of all ages beginning at the grassroots level.

== History ==
The AAU Junior Olympic Games originated from 'telegraphic' state track and field competitions. National Champions were determined through telephone and/or mail entries instead of head-to-head competition. In 1949, the AAU conducted its first 'live' national meet in Cleveland, Ohio – giving birth to the AAU Youth Sports Program. Because of the success of the national track and field head-to-head competition, AAU leaders solicited support from the business and corporate sectors. The Chevrolet Division of General Motors Corporation and the Quaker Oats Company assisted the AAU in their vision of the number of youngsters that could be helped.

As the popularity of the AAU Youth Sports Program increased, the AAU leaders decided to conduct two national championships simultaneously. The idea came to fruition when Vice-President Hubert H. Humphrey proclaimed the first AAU Junior Olympic Games open on August 21, 1967, in downtown Washington, D.C., at the Departmental Auditorium on Constitution Avenue. Five hundred twenty-three athletes competed in the inaugural AAU Junior Olympic Games that year. National champions were determined in swimming and track and field. Eighteen AAU records in swimming and three in track and field were established.

Since its beginning in Washington, D.C., the AAU Junior Olympic Games have been conducted in 19 states and 30 cities across the United States. The state of Tennessee leads the way with six AAU Junior Olympic Games to its credit. "There's nothing junior about it" has become the theme of the AAU Junior Olympic Games while growing to over 16,000 participants in over 20 sports. The Game's popularity has exploded to now represent all 50 states and several United States territories.

== Sports currently held ==
The following is a list of sports that currently take place at the Junior Olympic Games.

- Aquatics - Diving and Swimming
- Athletics Track & Field, Cross Country, and the Multi-Events
- Baseball
- Baton Twirling
- Basketball
- Beach Volleyball
- Bodybuilding - Teen, Collegiate, Women, and Men's Natural
- Bowling
- Cheerleading
- Dance/Drill
- Equestrian
- Field hockey
- Fencing
- Football
- Golf
- Gymnastics
- Inline Hockey
- Judo
- Jump Rope
- Karate
- Lacrosse
- Power Lifting
- Pickleball
- Indoor Soccer
- Roller Derby
- Softball
- Sport stacking
- Table tennis
- Taekwondo
- Volleyball
- Water Polo
- Weightlifting
- Wrestling
- Tumbling and Trampoline

== Sports previously held ==
Previously, a version of floor hockey whose rules were codified by Canada's Sam Jacks during the Great Depression in Toronto, Ontario, was a part of the games. In 1947, Jacks became the head coach of the Canadian Floor Hockey Team which competed in the AAU Junior Olympic Games in the USA where the Canadian team finished in third place. Two years later in 1949, the AAU conducted its first 'live' national meet in Cleveland, Ohio, giving birth to the AAU Youth Sports Program. Today the floor game is no longer a part of the Junior Games, but influenced the creation of a floor hockey variant which now exists as a part of the Special Olympics. Jacks would eventually go on to create the winter sport of ringette in 1963.

== Bodybuilding ==
Bodybuilding was considered an appropriate sport to be judged in the AAU due to its focus and "good moral values to athletic youth." It is divided into four classes: Teen (ages 14–18), Collegiate (19-28), Women's, and Men's Natural. As of 2011, there has been no notice of how the sport's admission to the event line-up will be viewed by audiences. Because the sport is not "athletic" in its competitive sense, contestants will have to do the following: do a posing routine with including the required poses in three stages (preliminary, solo, and final posedown), and they will have to submit a video essay on the sport and its effects on their lives, including nutrition, exercise, and the bodybuilding lifestyle. Bodybuilders will be judged on the following: overall mass, symmetry, aesthetic presentation, posing routine, submitted video essay, and inquiry. Any contestant found to be using illegal substances will be automatically disqualified, without opportunity to qualify in future AAU events.

== Locations ==
Year	Site	Sports	Athletes
1967	Washington, D.C.	2	523
1968	Knoxville, TN	4	690
1969	San Diego, CA	4	600
1970	Knoxville, TN	5	600
1971	Colorado Springs, CO	6	650
1972	Spokane, WA	6	675
1973	Ann Arbor, MI	6	700
1974	Lincoln, NE	8	1519
1975	Ithaca, NY	8	2095
1976	Memphis, TN	8	2300
1977	Lincoln, NE	7	1700
1978	Lincoln, NE	8	1763
1979	Lincoln, NE	7	2349
1980	Santa Clara, CA	7	2000
1981	Winston-Salem, NC	8	2351
1982	Memphis, TN	13	3229
1983	Notre Dame, IN	15	4829
1984	Jacksonville, FL	15	3460
1985	Iowa City, IA	15	3300
1986	St. Louis, MO	15	4848
1987	Syracuse, NY	14	4159
1988	Lawrence, KS	14	3949
1989	San Antonio, TX	14	5200
1990	St. Petersburg, FL	14	5447
1991	Tallahassee, FL	13	5866
1992	Rochester, MN	14	5937
1993	Knoxville, TN	16	5937
1994	Space Coast, FL	21	8902
1995	Des Moines, IA	27	8734
1996	New Orleans, LA	23	9862
1997	Charlotte, North Carolina	24	12,388
1998	Hampton Roads, VA	24	11,355
1999	Cleveland, OH	26	12,661
2000	Orlando, FL	24	13,227
2001	Hampton Roads, VA	24	13,282
2002	Knoxville, TN	23	13,657
2003	Detroit, MI	21	12,224
2004	Des Moines, IA	23	10,747
2005	New Orleans, LA	25	18,051
2006	Hampton Roads, VA	25	13,609
2007	Knoxville, TN	22	13,167
2008	Detroit, MI	20	12,852
2009	Des Moines, IA	19	11,836
2010	Hampton Roads, VA	17	14,740
2011	New Orleans, LA	19	15,727
2012	Houston, TX	20	14,252
2013	Detroit, MI	18	12,569
2014	Des Moines, IA	18	12,030
2015	Hampton Roads, VA	18	14,636
2016	Houston, TX	18	14,274
2017	Detroit, MI	17	12,935
2018	Des Moines, IA	15	11,557
2019	Greensboro, NC	16	16,019
2020	Brevard County, FL	12	3,875
2021	Houston, TX	11	13,368
2022	Greensboro, NC	12	16,480
2023	Des Moines, IA	11	13,235
2024	Greensboro, NC	12	15,000+
2025	Houston, TX	14	16,000+
2026	Des Moines, IA	16	14,000+

== Future Locations ==
Year	Site
2027	Houston, TX
2028	Baltimore, MD
2029	Greensboro, NC
2030	Des Moines, IA
2031	Houston, TX
2032	Baltimore, MD
2033	Greensboro, NC

== Dance/Drill Team event categories ==
- Ballet
- Pointe
- Jazz (dance)
- Lyrical
- Tap
- Novelty
- All Male
- Show Production
- Acrobatic/Dance
- Hip hop/Funk
- Modern/Abstract
- Prop
- High Kick
- Ballroom (DanceSport and Salsa)
- Clogging

== Karate event categories ==
- Kata
- Kumite
- Team Kumite
- Kobudo
