= Yasumasa Nishino (swimmer) =

Japanese swimmer

Personal information
- Born: 22 January 1925 Kōchi, Kōchi, Japan
- Died: 19 April 2004 (aged 79) Kōchi, Kōchi, Japan

Sport
- Sport: Swimming

Yasumasa Nishino (西野 恭正, Nishino Yasumasa; 22 January 1925 – 19 April 2004) was a Japanese swimmer. He competed in the men's 100 metre backstroke at the 1952 Summer Olympics.
