= Fernando Pavan =

Brazilian swimmer (1932–2019)

Personal information
- Born: 18 August 1932 Belo Horizonte, Brazil
- Died: 15 August 2019 (aged 86)

Sport
- Sport: Swimming

Fernando Pavan (18 August 1932 – 15 August 2019) was a Brazilian swimmer. He competed in the men's 100 metre backstroke at the 1952 Summer Olympics. Pavan died on 15 August 2019, at the age of 86.
