= List of Pan American Games medalists in swimming =

This is the complete list of Pan American Games medalists in swimming for men's, women's, and mixed relay events. Swimming has been a part of the Pan American Games since the Games' first edition in 1951.

== Men's events ==
=== 50 m freestyle ===
Games	Gold		Silver		Bronze	
1987	(United States) Tom Williams	22.55	(United States) Michael Neuhofel	22.84	(Canada) Claude Lamy (Netherlands Antilles) Hilton Woods	23.39
1991	(United States) Todd Pace	22.60	(United States) Adam Schmitt	22.61	(Brazil) Gustavo Borges	22.82
1995	(Brazil) Fernando Scherer	22.65	(United States) Bill Pilczuk	22.71	(United States) Tom Jager	22.75
1999	(Brazil) Fernando Scherer	22.24	(Argentina) José Meolans	22.46	(Cuba) Marcos Hernández	22.79
2003	(Brazil) Fernando Scherer	22.40	(Argentina) José Meolans	22.42	(United States) Gary Hall Jr.	22.43
2007	(Brazil) César Cielo	21.84	(Brazil) Nicholas Santos	22.18	(Trinidad and Tobago) George Bovell	22.30
2011	(Brazil) César Cielo	21.58	(Brazil) Bruno Fratus	22.05	(Cuba) Hanser García	22.15
2015	(United States) Josh Schneider	21.86	(Brazil) Bruno Fratus	21.91	(Trinidad and Tobago) George Bovell	22.17
2019	(Brazil) Bruno Fratus	21.61	(United States) Nathan Adrian	21.87	(United States) Michael Chadwick	21.99
2023	(United States) David Curtiss	21.85	(United States) Jonny Kulow	21.90	(The Bahamas) Lamar Taylor	22.13

=== 100 m freestyle ===
Games	Gold		Silver		Bronze	
1951	(United States) Dick Cleveland	58.8	(United States) Ronald Gora	59.5	(Cuba) Nicasio Silverio	1:00.1
1955	(United States) Clarke Scholes	57.7	(Canada) George Park	58.7	(United States) Carl Woolley	59.3
1959	(United States) Jeff Farrell	56.3	(United States) Elton Follett	57.2	(United States) Bill Woolsey	57.6
1963	(United States) Steve Clark	54.7	(United States) Steven Jackman	54.8	(Canada) Daniel Sherry	56.1
1967	(United States) Don Havens	53.79	(United States) Zac Zorn	53.97	(Canada) Sandy Gilchrist	54.85
1971	(United States) Frank Heckl	52.80	(Brazil) José Aranha	53.74	(Canada) Robert Kasting	53.76
1975	(United States) Richard Abbott	51.96	(United States) Jack Babashoff	52.26	(Canada) Bruce Robertson	53.44
1979	(United States) David McCagg	50.77	(Puerto Rico) Fernando Cañales	51.25	(United States) John Newton	51.45
1983	(United States) Rowdy Gaines	50.38	(Puerto Rico) Fernando Cañales	50.43	(Venezuela) Alberto Mestre	51.09
1987	(United States) Todd Dudley	50.24	(United States) Scott McCadam	50.81	(Canada) Mark Andrews	51.24
1991	(Brazil) Gustavo Borges	49.48	(United States) Joel Thomas	50.55	(Mexico) Rodrigo González	51.25
1995	(Brazil) Gustavo Borges	49.31	(United States) Jon Olsen	49.39	(Brazil) Fernando Scherer	49.79
1999	(Brazil) Fernando Scherer	49.19	(Argentina) José Martín Meolans	49.49	(Brazil) Gustavo Borges	50.10
2003	(Argentina) José Martín Meolans	49.27	(Trinidad and Tobago) George Bovell	49.61	(Brazil) Gustavo Borges	49.90
2007	(Brazil) César Cielo	48.79	(Argentina) José Martín Meolans	49.42	(United States) Gabe Woodward	49.59
2011	(Brazil) César Cielo	47.84	(Cuba) Hanser García	48.34	(Cayman Islands) Shaune Fraser	48.64
2015	(Argentina) Federico Grabich	48.26	(Canada) Santo Condorelli	48.57	(Brazil) Marcelo Chierighini	48.80
2019	(Brazil) Marcelo Chierighini	48.09	(United States) Nathan Adrian	48.17	(United States) Michael Chadwick	48.88
2023	(Brazil) Guilherme Caribé	48.06	(United States) Brooks Curry (United States) Jonny Kulow	48.38	Not awarded	

=== 200 m freestyle ===
Games	Gold		Silver		Bronze	
1967	(United States) Don Schollander	1:56.01	(Canada) Ralph Hutton	1:58.44	(Colombia) Julio Arango	2:01.77
1971	(United States) Frank Heckl	1:56.36	(United States) Jim McConica	1:58.18	(Canada) Ralph Hutton	1:59.89
1975	(Ecuador) Jorge Delgado	1:55.45	(United States) Rick DeMont	1:55.96	(United States) Rex Favero	1:57.08
1979	(United States) Rowdy Gaines	1:51.22	(United States) David Larson	1:52.24	(Brazil) Djan Madruga	1:52.34
1983	(United States) Bruce Hayes	1:49.89	(Venezuela) Alberto Mestre	1:50.36	(United States) Rowdy Gaines	1:51.27
1987	(United States) John Witchel	1:50.90	(Uruguay) Carlos Scanavino	1:51.21	(United States) Brian Jones	1:52.11
1991	(United States) Eric Diehl	1:49.67	(Brazil) Gustavo Borges	1:49.74	(Cuba) René Sáez	1:52.14
1995	(Brazil) Gustavo Borges	1:48.49	(United States) Greg Burgess	1:48.69	(United States) Josh Davis	1:51.92
1999	(Brazil) Gustavo Borges	1:49.41	(United States) Scott Tucker	1:50.99	(Brazil) Leonardo Costa	1:51.29
2003	(Trinidad and Tobago) George Bovell	1:48.90	(United States) Dan Ketchum	1:49.34	(Brazil) Rodrigo Castro	1:49.55
2007	(United States) Matthew Owen	1:48.78	(Cayman Islands) Shaune Fraser	1:48.95	(Canada) Adam Sioui	1:48.97
2011	(Cayman Islands) Brett Fraser	1:47.18	(Cayman Islands) Shaune Fraser	1:48.29	(Paraguay) Ben Hockin	1:48.48
2015	(Brazil) João de Lucca	1.46.42	(Argentina) Federico Grabich	1:46.42	(United States) Michael Weiss	1:47.63
2019	(Brazil) Fernando Scheffer	1:46.68	(Brazil) Breno Correia	1:47.47	(United States) Drew Kibler	1:47.71
2023	(United States) Coby Carrozza	1:47.37	(Mexico) Jorge Iga	1:47.56	(Brazil) Murilo Sartori	1:47.95

=== 400 m freestyle ===
Games	Gold		Silver		Bronze	
1951	(Brazil) Tetsuo Okamoto	4:52.4	(United States) Bill Heusner	4:54.5	(Mexico) Tonatiuh Gutiérrez	4:57.2
1955	(United States) Jimmy McLane	4:51.3	(United States) Wayne Moore	4:53.4	(Argentina) Oscar Kramer	4:56.1
1959	(United States) George Breen	4:31.4	(United States) George Harrison	4:31.8	(United States) Gene Lenz	4:34.9
1963	(United States) Roy Saari	4:19.3	(United States) Don Schollander	4:23.3	(Canada) Sandy Gilchrist	4:29.1
1967	(United States) Greg Charlton	4:10.23	(Canada) Ralph Hutton	4:11.88	(United States) Michael Burton	4:15.74
1971	(United States) Jim McConica	4:08.97	(United States) Steve Genter	4:13.05	(Canada) Ralph Hutton	4:15.75
1975	(United States) Doug Northway	4:00.51	(United States) Bobby Hackett	4:03.38	(Brazil) Djan Madruga	4:06.83
1979	(United States) Brian Goodell	3:53.01	(Brazil) Djan Madruga	3:57.46	(Canada) Peter Szmidt	3:58.34
1983	(United States) Bruce Hayes	3:53.17	(United States) Matt Cetlinski	3:53.51	(Brazil) Marcelo Jucá	3:55.66
1987	(United States) Paul Robinson	3:54.44	(Brazil) Cristiano Michelena	3:55.37	(United States) Scott Brackett	3:55.64
1991	(United States) Sean Killion	3:50.38	(Puerto Rico) Jorge Herrera	3:54.91	(United States) Eric Diehl	3:58.06
1995	(United States) Josh Davis	3:55.59	(Brazil) Luiz Lima	3:56.33	(United States) Jon Sakovich	3:57.37
1999	(Brazil) Luiz Lima	3:52.25	(United States) Austin Ramirez	3:53.64	(Canada) Rick Say	3:54.66
2003	(Venezuela) Ricardo Monasterio	3:50.01	(United States) Fran Crippen	3:52.62	(Brazil) Bruno Bonfim	3:54.82
2007	(United States) Matt Patton	3:49.77	(United States) Tobias Work	3:50.62	(Brazil) Armando Negreiros	3:51.18
2011	(United States) Charlie Houchin	3:50.95	(United States) Matt Patton	3:51.25	(Venezuela) Cristian Quintero	3:52.51
2015	(Canada) Ryan Cochrane	3:48.29	(United States) Ryan Feeley	3:49.69	(Brazil) Leonardo de Deus	3:50.30
2019	(United States) Andrew Abruzzo	3:48.41	(Brazil) Fernando Scheffer	3:49.60	(Brazil) Luiz Altamir Melo	3:49.91
2023	(Brazil) Guilherme Costa	3:46.79	(Venezuela) Alfonso Mestre	3:47.62	(United States) James Plage	3:50.74

=== 800 m freestyle ===
Games	Gold		Silver		Bronze	
2019	(United States) Andrew Abruzzo	7:54.50	(Brazil) Miguel Valente	7:56.37	(Mexico) Ricardo Vargas	7:56.78
2023	(Brazil) Guilherme Costa	7:53.01	(Venezuela) Alfonso Mestre	7:54.46	(United States) Will Gallant	7:58.96

=== 1500 m freestyle ===
Games	Gold		Silver		Bronze	
1951	(Brazil) Tetsuo Okamoto	19:23.3	(Mexico) Tonatiuh Gutiérrez	19:24.5	(Mexico) Efrén Fierro	19:57.4
1955	(United States) Jimmy McLane	20:04.0	(Argentina) Oscar Kramer	20:09.9	(Colombia) Gilberto Martínez	20:37.2
1959	(United States) Alan Somers	17:53.2	(United States) George Breen	17:55.0	(United States) Gary Heinrich	18:30.6
1963	(United States) Roy Saari	17:26.2	(Canada) Sandy Gilchrist	17:58.9	(Canada) Ralph Hutton	18:08.6
1967	(United States) Michael Burton	16:44.40	(Canada) Ralph Hutton	16:51.81	(United States) Andy Strenk	17:03.43
1971	(United States) Pat Miles	16:32.03	(United States) Tom McBreen	16:32.99	(Mexico) Guillermo García	16:45.56
1975	(United States) Bobby Hackett	15:53.10	(United States) Paul Hartloff	15:57.32	(Brazil) Djan Madruga	16:30.08
1979	(United States) Brian Goodell	15:24.36	(Brazil) Djan Madruga	15:41.74	(United States) Bobby Hackett	15:46.83
1983	(United States) Jeff Kostoff	15:30.67	(Brazil) Marcelo Jucá	15:33.01	(Uruguay) Carlos Scanavino	15:36.07
1987	(United States) Alex Kostich	15:20.90	(United States) Lars Jorgensen	15:24.09	(Canada) Christopher Chalmers	15:30.51
1991	(United States) Alex Kostich	15:21.36	(Puerto Rico) Jorge Herrera	15:33.61	(Cuba) Pedro Carrío	15:39.73
1995	(United States) Carlton Bruner	15:13.90	(Brazil) Luiz Lima	15:19.53	(United States) Ryan Cox	15:37.28
1999	(United States) Tim Siciliano	15:14.94	(Brazil) Luiz Lima	15:21.92	(Venezuela) Ricardo Monasterio	15:28.64
2003	(Venezuela) Ricardo Monasterio	15:16.98	(United States) Fran Crippen	15:19.63	(United States) Chris Thompson	15:19.64
2007	(United States) Charles Peterson	15:12.33	(Venezuela) Ricardo Monasterio	15:23.28	(Canada) Kier Maitland	15:25.28
2011	(United States) Arthur Frayler	15:19.59	(United States) Joseph Feely	15:22.19	(Argentina) Juan Pereyra	15:26.20
2015	(Canada) Ryan Cochrane	15:06.40	(United States) Andrew Gemmell	15:09.92	(Brazil) Brandonn Almeida	15:11.70
2019	(Brazil) Guilherme Costa	15:09.93	(United States) Nicholas Sweetser	15:14.24	(Mexico) Ricardo Vargas	15:14.99
2023	(Brazil) Guilherme Costa	15:09.23	(United States) Will Gallant	15:12.94	(Venezuela) Alfonso Mestre	15:19.60

=== 100 m backstroke ===
Games	Gold		Silver		Bronze	
1951	(United States) Allen Stack	1:08.0	(Argentina) Pedro Galvão	1:08.3	(United States) Burwell Jones	1:09.8
1955	(United States) Frank McKinney	1:07.1	(Argentina) Pedro Galvão	1:07.8	(United States) Buddy Baarcke	1:07.9
1959	(United States) Frank McKinney	1:03.6	(United States) Chuck Bittick	1:04.2	(United States) Louis Schaeffer	1:05.3
1963	(United States) Ed Bartsch	1:01.5	(United States) Chuck Bittick	1:02.1	(Brazil) Athos de Oliveira	1:03.2
1967	(United States) Charlie Hickcox	1:01.19	(United States) Fred Haywood	1:02.45	(Canada) Jim Shaw	1:02.87
1971	(United States) Melvin Nash	59.84	(United States) John Murphy	1:00.84	(Canada) Bill Kennedy	1:01.35
1975	(United States) Peter Rocca	58.31	(United States) Bob Jackson	58.90	(Brazil) Rômulo Arantes	59.16
1979	(United States) Bob Jackson	56.66	(Brazil) Rômulo Arantes	57.20	(Canada) Steve Pickell	57.89
1983	(United States) Rick Carey	55.19	(United States) Dave Bottom	56.90	(Canada) Mike West	57.20
1987	(United States) Andy Gill	56.56	(United States) David Berkoff	57.35	(Peru) Alejandro Alvizuri	58.65
1991	(United States) Andy Gill	55.79	(Cuba) Rodolfo Falcón	56.12	(United States) Bobby Brewer	56.39
1995	(United States) Jeff Rouse	54.74	(United States) Tripp Schwenk	55.60	(Cuba) Rodolfo Falcón	56.13
1999	(Cuba) Rodolfo Falcón	54.93	(Brazil) Alexandre Massura	55.17	(United States) Matt Allen	55.86
2003	(United States) Peter Marshall	55.52	(Trinidad and Tobago) George Bovell	55.81	(United States) Jayme Cramer	55.88
2007	(United States) Randall Bal	53.66	(United States) Peter Marshall	54.64	(Brazil) Thiago Pereira	54.75
2011	(Brazil) Thiago Pereira	54.56	(United States) Eugene Godsoe	54.61	(Brazil) Guilherme Guido	54.81
2015	(United States) Nick Thoman	53.20	(Brazil) Guilherme Guido	53.35	(United States) Eugene Godsoe	53.96
2019	(United States) Daniel Carr	53.50	(Brazil) Guilherme Guido	53.54	(Trinidad and Tobago) Dylan Carter	54.41
2023	(United States) Adam Chaney	54.20	(Argentina) Ulises Saravia	54.23	(Canada) Blake Tierney	54.25

=== 200 m backstroke ===
Games	Gold		Silver		Bronze	
1967	(Canada) Ralph Hutton	2:12.55	(United States) Charlie Hickcox	2:13.05	(United States) Charles Goettsche	2:15.94
1971	(United States) Charlie Campbell	2:07.09	(United States) Tim McKee	2:07.87	(Canada) John Hawes	2:14.72
1975	(United States) Dan Harrigan	2:06.69	(Canada) Mike Scarth	2:09.20	(United States) Bob Jackson	2:10.18
1979	(United States) Peter Rocca	2:00.98	(United States) Jesse Vassallo	2:02.07	(Brazil) Djan Madruga	2:04.74
1983	(United States) Rick Carey	1:59.34	(Brazil) Ricardo Prado	2:02.85	(Canada) Mike West	2:03.11
1987	(United States) Mike O'Brien	2:02.29	(Brazil) Ricardo Prado	2:03.75	(Canada) Raymond Brown	2:04.28
1991	(Brazil) Rogério Romero	2:01.07	(United States) Dan Veatch	2:01.14	(Puerto Rico) Manuel Guzmán	2:01.68
1995	(United States) Brad Bridgewater	2:00.79	(Cuba) Rodolfo Falcón	2:00.98	(Brazil) Rogério Romero	2:01.13
1999	(Brazil) Leonardo Costa	1:59.33	(United States) Aaron Peirsol	1:59.77	(United States) Dan Shevchik	2:00.27
2003	(Brazil) Rogério Romero	1:59.92	(United States) Luke Wagner	2:00.74	(United States) Joey Faltraco	2:01.31
2007	(Brazil) Thiago Pereira	1:58.42	(United States) Scott Clary	1:59.24	(Brazil) Lucas Salatta	1:59.51
2011	(Brazil) Thiago Pereira	1:57.19	(Colombia) Omar Pinzón	1:58.31	(United States) Ryan Murphy	1:58.50
2015	(United States) Sean Lehane	1:57.47	(United States) Carter Griffin	1:58.18	(Brazil) Leonardo de Deus	1:58.27
2019	(United States) Daniel Carr	1:58.13	(United States) Nick Alexander	1:58.30	(Brazil) Leonardo de Deus	1:58.73
2023	(United States) Jack Aikins	1:56.58	(United States) Ian Grum	1:57.19	(Canada) Hugh McNeill	1:59.96

=== 100 m breaststroke ===
Games	Gold		Silver		Bronze	
1967	(Brazil) José Fiolo	1:07.52	(United States) Russell Webb	1:09.13	(United States) Ken Merten	1:09.32
1971	(United States) Mark Chatfield	1:06.75	(United States) Brian Job	1:07.93	(Brazil) José Fiolo	1:07.94
1975	(United States) Rick Colella	1:06.28	(United States) Lawrence Dowler	1:06.61	(Brazil) José Fiolo	1:08.12
1979	(United States) Steve Lundquist	1:03.82	(United States) Greg Winchell	1:04.76	(Canada) Graham Smith	1:05.66
1983	(United States) Steve Lundquist	1:02.28	(United States) John Moffet	1:02.36	(Colombia) Pablo Restrepo	1:03.89
1987	(United States) Rich Korhammer	1:03.85	(United States) David Lundberg	1:04.11	(Canada) Darcy Wallingford	1:04.55
1991	(United States) Hans Dersch	1:02.57	(Puerto Rico) Todd Torres	1:02.83	(United States) Jeff Commings	1:03.02
1995	(United States) Seth Van Neerden	1:02.48	(Canada) Jonathan Cleveland	1:03.17	(United States) Tyler Mayfield	1:03.17
1999	(United States) Ed Moses	1:00.99	(United States) Jarrod Marrs (Canada) Morgan Knabe	1:02.11	Not awarded	
2003	(United States) Mark Gangloff	1:00.95	(United States) Jarrod Marrs	1:01.71	(Brazil) Eduardo Fischer	1:01.88
2007	(Canada) Scott Dickens	1:01.20	(United States) Mark Gangloff	1:01.24	(Canada) Mathieu Bois	1:01.83
2011	(Brazil) Felipe França Silva	1:00.34	(Brazil) Felipe Lima	1:00.99	(United States) Marcus Titus	1:01.12
2015	(Brazil) Felipe França Silva	59.21	(Brazil) Felipe Lima	1:00.01	(Canada) Richard Funk	1:00.19
2019	(Brazil) João Gomes Júnior	59.51	(United States) Cody Miller	59.57	(United States) Kevin Cordes	1:00.27
2023	(United States) Jacob Foster	59.99	(United States) Noah Nichols	1:00.43	(Mexico) Miguel de Lara	1:00.90

=== 200 m breaststroke ===
Games	Gold		Silver		Bronze	
1951	(Argentina) Héctor Domínguez	2:43.8	(Brazil) Willy Otto Jordan	2:47.3	(United States) Bowen Stassforth	2:47.6
1955	(Argentina) Héctor Domínguez	2:46.9	(Cuba) Manuel Sanguily	2:47.3	(Mexico) Walter Ocampo	2:50.7
1959	(United States) Bill Mulliken	2:43.1	(United States) Kenneth Nakasone	2:43.2	(Cuba) Manuel Sanguily	2:44.3
1963	(United States) Chet Jastremski	2:35.4	(United States) Ken Merten	2:38.4	(Canada) John Kelso	2:41.4
1967	(Brazil) José Fiolo	2:30.42	(United States) Robert Momsen	2:31.01	(United States) Ken Merten	2:34.17
1971	(United States) Rick Colella	2:27.12	(Mexico) Felipe Muñoz	2:27.22	(United States) Brian Job	2:28.11
1975	(United States) Rick Colella	2:24.00	(Canada) Dave Heinbuch	2:28.96	(Mexico) Gustavo Lozano	2:29.28
1979	(United States) Steve Lundquist	2:21.97	(United States) John Simmons	2:22.45	(Colombia) Pablo Restrepo	2:23.13
1983	(United States) Steve Lundquist	2:19.31	(Colombia) Pablo Restrepo	2:20.21	(United States) Doug Soltis	2:20.89
1987	(United States) Jeff Kubiak	2:17.62	(United States) Mike Barrowman	2:19.29	(Canada) Darcy Wallingford	2:22.01
1991	(Cuba) Mario González	2:15.50	(United States) Nelson Diebel	2:16.08	(United States) Tyler Mayfield	2:17.49
1995	(United States) Seth Van Neerden	2:16.08	(United States) Eric Namesnik	2:17.70	(Canada) Curtis Myden	2:19.00
1999	(Canada) Morgan Knabe	2:14.73	(United States) Steven West	2:16.26	(United States) Mark Gangloff	2:16.60
2003	(United States) Kyle Salyards	2:13.37	(United States) Sean Quinn	2:15.77	(Brazil) Marcelo Tomazini	2:15.87
2007	(Brazil) Thiago Pereira	2:13.51	(Brazil) Henrique Barbosa	2:13.83	(United States) Scott Spann	2:13.98
2011	(United States) Sean Mahoney	2:11.62	(United States) Clark Burckle	2:12.60	(Brazil) Thiago Pereira	2:13.58
2015	(Brazil) Thiago Simon	2:09.82	(Canada) Richard Funk	2:11.51	(Brazil) Thiago Pereira	2:13.58
2019	(United States) Will Licon	2:07.62	(United States) Nicolas Fink	2:08.16	(Mexico) Miguel de Lara	2:1.23
2023	(United States) Jacob Foster	2:10.71	(Canada) Brayden Taivassalo	2:10.89	(Mexico) Andrés Bustamante	2:11.99

=== 100 m butterfly ===
Games	Gold		Silver		Bronze	
1967	(United States) Mark Spitz	56.20	(United States) Ross Wales	57.04	(Argentina) Luis Nicolao	58.63
1971	(United States) Frank Heckl	56.92	(United States) Jerry Heidenreich	57.30	(Canada) Byron MacDonald	58.40
1975	(United States) Mike Curington	56.09	(United States) Gregory Jagenburg	56.13	(Canada) Bruce Robertson	56.80
1979	(United States) Robert Placak	55.54	(Canada) Dan Thompson	55.56	(Canada) Clay Evans	56.63
1983	(United States) Matt Gribble	54.25	(Canada) Pablo Morales	54.62	(Canada) Rafael Vidal	54.72
1987	(Suriname) Anthony Nesty	53.89	(United States) Wade King	54.33	(United States) Michael Dillon	54.45
1991	(Suriname) Anthony Nesty	53.45	(United States) Mike Merrell	54.60	(Brazil) Eduardo Piccinini	55.00
1995	(United States) Mark Henderson	54.11	(Brazil) Eduardo Piccinini	54.63	(United States) Brian Alderman	54.75
1999	(Venezuela) Francisco Sánchez	53.33	(Canada) Shamek Pietucha	53.40	(Argentina) José Martín Meolans	54.03
2003	(United States) Ben Michaelson	53.04	(Argentina) José Martín Meolans	53.28	(Brazil) Kaio de Almeida	53.44
2007	(Brazil) Kaio de Almeida	52.05	(Brazil) Gabriel Mangabeira	52.43	(Venezuela) Albert Subirats	52.78
2011	(Venezuela) Albert Subirats	52.37	(United States) Eugene Godsoe	52.67	(United States) Chris Brady	52.95
2015	(United States) Giles Smith	52.04	(Argentina) Santiago Grassi	52.09	(Canada) Santo Condorelli	52.42
2019	(United States) Tom Shields	51.59	(Guatemala) Luis Martínez	51.63	(Brazil) Vinicius Lanza	51.88
2023	(United States) Lukas Miller	51.98	(Brazil) Vinicius Lanza	52.52	(United States) Arsenio Bustos	52.60

=== 200 m butterfly ===
Games	Gold		Silver		Bronze	
1955	(Mexico) Eulalio Ríos	2:39.8	(Mexico) Walter Ocampo	2:40.3	(United States) William Yorzyk	2:42.5
1959	(United States) Dave Gillanders	2:18.0	(United States) Mike Troy	2:18.3	(Mexico) Eulalio Ríos	2:22.5
1963	(United States) Carl Robie	2:11.3	(United States) Fred Schmidt	2:13.3	(Argentina) Luis Nicolao	2:16.1
1967	(United States) Mark Spitz	2:06.42	(Canada) Tom Arusoo	2:10.70	(United States) Mike Burton	2:13.26
1971	(Ecuador) Jorge Delgado	2:06.41	(United States) Rob Orr	2:08.39	(Peru) Augusto González	2:09.90
1975	(United States) Gregory Jagenburg	2:03.42	(United States) Steve Gregg	2:04.06	(Ecuador) Jorge Delgado	2:05.11
1979	(United States) Craig Beardsley	2:00.49	(Canada) George Nagy	2:02.15	(Canada) Bill Sawchuk	2:02.93
1983	(United States) Craig Beardsley	1:58.85	(Brazil) Ricardo Prado	1:59.00	(Venezuela) Rafael Vidal	1:59.17
1987	(United States) Bill Stapleton	2:00.70	(United States) Jayme Taylor	2:00.73	(Suriname) Anthony Nesty	2:01.09
1991	(United States) Mark Dean	2:00.11	(Suriname) Anthony Nesty	2:01.76	(United States) Bart Pippenger	2:02.00
1995	(Venezuela) Nelson Mora	2:00.38	(United States) Tom Malchow	2:00.49	(Brazil) André Teixeira	2:01.95
1999	(Canada) Shamek Pietucha	1:59.10	(United States) Steven Brown	1:59.52	(United States) Devin Howard	1:59.82
2003	(United States) Michael Raab	1:57.33	(Brazil) Kaio de Almeida	1:58.10	(Brazil) Pedro Monteiro	1:59.38
2007	(Brazil) Kaio de Almeida	1:55.45	(United States) Eddie Erazo	1:57.07	(Mexico) Juan Veloz	1:58.43
2011	(Brazil) Leonardo de Deus	1:57.92	(United States) Daniel Madwed	1:58.52	(Brazil) Kaio de Almeida	1:58.78
2015	(Brazil) Leonardo de Deus	1:55.01	(Canada) Zack Chetrat	1:56.90	(Canada) Alec Page	1:58.01
2019	(Brazil) Leonardo de Deus	1:55.86	(United States) Samuel Pomajevich	1:57.35	(Colombia) Jonathan Gómez	1:57.75
2023	(United States) Mason Laur	1:56.44	(Brazil) Leonardo de Deus	1:57.25	(United States) Jack Dahlgren	1:57.53

=== 200 m individual medley ===
Games	Gold		Silver		Bronze	
1967	(United States) Doug Russell	2:13.22	(United States) William Utley	2:13.68	(Canada) Sandy Gilchrist	2:16.61
1971	(United States) Steve Furniss	2:10.82	(United States) Frank Heckl	2:12.11	(Mexico) Felipe Muñoz	2:16.28
1975	(United States) Steve Furniss	2:09.77	(United States) Mike Curington	2:10.17	(Canada) Bill Sawchuk	2:11.63
1979	(United States) Jesse Vassallo	2:03.29	(Canada) Graham Smith	2:05.86	(United States) Scott Spann	2:11.63
1983	(Brazil) Ricardo Prado	2:04.51	(United States) Bill Barrett	2:04.90	(United States) Steve Lundquist	2:06.36
1987	(United States) Bill Stapleton	2:03.58	(United States) Paul Wallace	2:04.92	(Brazil) Ricardo Prado	2:04.94
1991	(United States) Ron Karnaugh	2:00.92	(Puerto Rico) Manuel Guzmán	2:03.99	(United States) Ray Looze	2:04.29
1995	(Canada) Curtis Myden	2:01.70	(United States) Greg Burgess	2:03.62	(United States) Eric Namesnik	2:03.70
1999	(Canada) Curtis Myden	2:02.38	(United States) Joe Montague	2:03.08	(Canada) Owen Von Richter	2:03.80
2003	(Trinidad and Tobago) George Bovell	1:59.49	(Brazil) Thiago Pereira	2:02.31	(United States) Eric Donnelly	2:02.52
2007	(Brazil) Thiago Pereira	1:57.79	(United States) Robert Margalis	2:00.69	(Barbados) Bradley Ally	2:00.96
2011	(Brazil) Thiago Pereira	1:58.07	(United States) Conor Dwyer	1:58.64	(Brazil) Henrique Rodrigues	2:03.41
2015	(Brazil) Henrique Rodrigues	1:57.06	(Brazil) Thiago Pereira	1:57.42	(United States) Gunnar Bentz	2:00.04
2019	(United States) Will Licon	1:59.13	(Brazil) Caio Pumputis	2:00.12	(Brazil) Leonardo Coelho Santos	2:00.29
2023	(Canada) Finlay Knox	1:57.84	(United States) Arsenio Bustos	1:59.89	(Brazil) Leonardo Coelho	2:00.58

=== 400 m individual medley ===
Games	Gold		Silver		Bronze	
1967	(United States) William Utley	4:48.12	(United States) Ken Webb	4:50.89	(Canada) Sandy Gilchrist	4:55.60
1971	(United States) Steve Furniss	4:42.69	(Mexico) Ricardo Marmolejo	4:49.04	(United States) Rick Colella	4:49.30
1975	(United States) Steve Furniss	4:40.38	(United States) Rick Colella	4:40.91	(Mexico) Ricardo Marmolejo	4:43.87
1979	(United States) Jesse Vassallo	4:21.63	(Canada) Bill Sawchuk	4:30.21	(Canada) Alex Baumann	4:32.42
1983	(Brazil) Ricardo Prado	4:21.43	(United States) Jeff Kostoff	4:27.99	(United States) Mike O'Brien	4:30.45
1987	(United States) Jerry Frentsos	4:23.92	(United States) Jeff Prior	4:26.31	(Canada) Michael Meldrum	4:29.63
1991	(United States) Alex Kostich	4:23.96	(United States) Jody Braden	4:26.25	(Canada) Jasen Pratt	4:26.31
1995	(Canada) Curtis Myden	4:18.55	(United States) Eric Namesnik	4:19.00	(United States) Iain Mull	4:26.32
1999	(Canada) Curtis Myden	4:15.52	(United States) Eric Donnelly	4:17.86	(Canada) Owen Von Richter	4:19.62
2003	(United States) Robert Margalis	4:19.09	(United States) Eric Donnelly	4:19.65	(Brazil) Thiago Pereira	4:19.89
2007	(Brazil) Thiago Pereira	4:11.14	(United States) Robert Margalis	4:17.52	(Canada) Keith Beavers	4:19.01
2011	(Brazil) Thiago Pereira	4:16.68	(United States) Conor Dwyer	4:18.22	(United States) Robert Margalis	4:24.88
2015	(Brazil) Brandonn Almeida	4:14.47	(Canada) Luke Reilly	4:16.16	(United States) Max Williamson	4:16.91
2019	(United States) Charlie Swanson	4:11.46	(Brazil) Leonardo Coelho Santos	4:19.41	(Brazil) Brandonn Almeida	4:21.10
2023	(United States) Jay Litherland	4:15.44	(Canada) Collyn Gagne	4:17.05	(Brazil) Brandonn Almeida	4:18.74

=== 4×100 m freestyle ===
Games	Gold		Silver		Bronze	
1967	United States; Ken Walsh; Mike Fitzmaurice; Mark Spitz; Don Schollander	3:34.08	Canada; Ralph Hutton; Robert Kasting; Sandy Gilchrist; Ron Jacks	3:40.82	Argentina; Mario de Lucca; Carlos van der Maath; Juan Carranza; Luis Nicolao	3:45.50
1971	United States; David Edgar; Steve Genter; Jerry Heidenreich; Frank Heckl	3:32.15	Canada; Timothy Bach; Ian MacKenzie; Brian Phillips; Robert Kasting	3:38.15	Brazil; Ruy de Oliveira; Flávio Machado; Paulo Zanetti; José Aranha	3:42.48
1975	United States; Jack Babashoff; Alan Ruby; Mike Grattan; Richard Abbott	3:27.67	Canada; Bruce Robertson; Gary MacDonald; Michael Bloahdal; Steve Hardy	3:36.24	Mexico; Guillermo García; Eduardo Pérez; Jorge Necochea; Ricardo Sasser	3:39.17
1979	United States; Rowdy Gaines; Jack Babashoff; John Newton; David McCagg	3:23.71	Canada; Graham Welbourn; Alan Swanston; Bill Sawchuk; Peter Szmidt	3:29.64	Brazil; Cyro Delgado; Djan Madruga; Marcus Mattioli; Rômulo Arantes	3:30.86
1983	United States; Robin Leamy; Matt Gribble; Chris Cavanaugh; Rowdy Gaines	3:21.41	Brazil; Ronald Menezes; Jorge Fernandes; Djan Madruga; Cyro Delgado	3:27.59	Venezuela; Jean François; Antonio Sánchez; Rafael Vidal; Alberto Mestre	3:29.06
1987	United States; Jim Born; Scott McCadam; Paul Robinson; Todd Dudley	3:19.97	Canada; Darren Ward; Claude Lamy; Brad Creelman; Gary Vandermeulen	3:26.09	Brazil; Jorge Fernandes; Cristiano Michelena; Cyro Delgado; Júlio López	3:27.11
1991	Brazil; Teófilo Ferreira; Emanuel Nascimento; Júlio López; Gustavo Borges	3:23.28	Canada; Reggie Lacoursiere; Ronald Page; Stephen Clarke; Steven Vandermeulen	3:25.39	Puerto Rico; David Monasterio; Jorge Herrera; Manuel Guzmán; Ricardo Busquets	3:27.17
1995	United States; Gary Hall Jr. Tom Jager; Josh Davis; Jon Olsen	3:18.60	Brazil; Fernando Scherer; Gustavo Borges; Eduardo Piccinini; Roberto Piovesan	3:20.33	Venezuela; Diego Henao; Alejandro Carrizo; Michael Lilinthal; Francisco Sánchez	3:25.43
1999	Brazil; Fernando Scherer; César Quintaes; André Cordeiro; Gustavo Borges	3:17.18	United States; Scott Tucker; Dan Phillips; Jarod Schroeder; Justin Ewers	3:19.00	Venezuela; Luis Rojas; Francisco Páez; José Quevedo; Francisco Sánchez	3:22.21
2003	Brazil; Carlos Jayme; Gustavo Borges; Fernando Scherer; Jader Souza	3:18.66	Venezuela; Oswaldo Quevedo; Raymond Rosal; Luis Rojas; Octavio Alesi	3:23.14	Canada; Brian Edey; Chad Murray; Matt Rose; Colin Russell	3:23.83
2007	Brazil; Fernando Silva; Eduardo Deboni; Nicolas Oliveira; César Cielo; Thiago Pereira*; Nicholas Santos*	3:15.90	United States; Gabe Woodward; Ricky Berens; Dale Rogers; Andy Grant; Gary Hall Jr.* Alex Righi*	3:16.66	Venezuela; Albert Subirats; Octavio Alesi; Luis Rojas; Crox Acuña; Jesus Casanova*; Reymer Vezga*	3:18.97
2011	Brazil; César Cielo; Bruno Fratus; Nicholas Santos; Nicolas Oliveira; Gabriel Mangabeira*; Thiago Pereira*; Henrique Rodrigues*	3:14.65	United States; William Copeland; Chris Brady; Bobby Savulich; Scot Robison; Eugene Godsoe*; Conor Dwyer*	3:15.62	Venezuela; Octavio Alesi; Crox Acuña; Cristian Quintero; Albert Subirats; Luis Rojas Martinez*; Roberto Goméz*; Daniele Tirabassi*	3:19.92
2015	Brazil; Matheus Santana; João de Lucca; Bruno Fratus; Marcelo Chierighini; Nicolas Oliveira*; Thiago Pereira*	3:13.66	Canada; Santo Condorelli; Karl Krug; Evan van Moerkerke; Yuri Kisil; Markus Thormeyer*; Stefan Milošević*	3:14.32	United States; Josh Schneider; Darian Townsend; Cullen Jones; Michael Weiss; Michael Klueh*; Eugene Godsoe*	3:16.21
2019	Brazil; Breno Correia; Marcelo Chierighini; Bruno Fratus; Pedro Spajari	3:12.61	United States; Michael Chadwick; Drew Kibler; Grant House; Nathan Adrian	3:14.94	Mexico; Gabriel Castaño; Daniel Ramírez; Jorge Iga; Long Gutiérrez	3:17.70
2023	Brazil; Guilherme Caribé; Marcelo Chierighini; Victor Alcará; Felipe Ribeiro de Souza; Breno Correia*	3:13.51	United States; Jonny Kulow; Adam Chaney; Jack Aikins; Brooks Curry; Coby Carrozza*; Lukas Miller*	3:14.22	Canada; Javier Acevedo; Édouard Fullum-Huot; Stephen Calkins; Finlay Knox; Jeremy Bagshaw*; Blake Tierney*	3:15.83

=== 4×200 m freestyle ===
Games	Gold		Silver		Bronze	
1951	United States; Ronald Gora; Burwell Jones; Dick Cleveland; Bill Heusner	9:00.6	Brazil; Ricardo Capanema; Aram Boghossian; João Gonçalves Filho; Tetsuo Okamoto	9:13.0	Argentina; Pedro Galvão; Carlos Alberto Bonacich; Jorge Vogt; César Guardo	9:19.5
1955	United States; Martin Smith; William Yorzyk; Wayne Moore; Jimmy McLane	9:00.0	Argentina; Pedro Galvão; Federico Zwanck; José Izaguirre; Jorge Vogt	9:09.0	Canada; George Park; Allen Gilchrist; Gerry McNamee; Ted Simpson	9:12.2
1959	United States; Dick Blick; Peter Sintz; John Rounsavelle; Frank Winters	8:22.7	Mexico; Raúl Guzmán; Alfredo Guzmán; Jorge Escalante; Mauricio Ocampo	8:56.4	Canada; Cam Grout; Edward Cazalet; William Campbell; Thomas Verth	9:00.4
1963	United States; Gary Ilman; Richard McDonough; David Lyons; Ed Townsend	8:16.9	Canada; Ralph Hutton; Aldwin Meinhardt; Ed Casalet; Sandy Gilchrist	8:33.0	Brazil; Athos de Oliveira; Antonio Renzo Filho; Antonio Celso Guimarães; Peter Wolfgang Metzner	8:41.4
1967	United States; Don Schollander; Charlie Hickcox; Greg Charlton; Mark Spitz	8:00.46	Canada; Sandy Gilchrist; Ron Jacks; Robert Kasting; Ralph Hutton	8:07.16	Argentina; Héctor Scerbo; Mario de Lucca; Carlos van der Maath; Luis Nicolao	8:19.48
1971	United States; Jerry Heidenreich; Jim McConica; Steve Genter; Frank Heckl	7:45.82	Canada; Robert Kasting; Ron Jacks; Brian Phillips; Ralph Hutton	8:04.76	Brazil; Alfredo Machado; Ruy de Oliveira; José Aranha; Flávio Machado	8:08.42
1975	United States; Rick DeMont; Rex Favero; Brad Horner; Michael Curington	7:50.96	Canada; Steve Hardy; Michael Bloahdal; Daryl Skilling; Bruce Robertson	8:00.91	Brazil; Djan Madruga; José Namorado; Paul Jouanneau; Rômulo Arantes	8:02.36
1979	United States; Brian Goodell; David Larson; Kris Kirchner; Rowdy Gaines	7:31.28	Brazil; Cyro Delgado; Djan Madruga; Jorge Fernandes; Marcus Mattioli	7:38.92	Canada; Peter Szmidt; Graham Welbourn; Rob Bayliss; Bill Sawchuk	7:29.27
1983	United States; David Larson; Richard Saeger; Bruce Hayes; Rowdy Gaines	7:23.63	Brazil; Djan Madruga; Marcelo Jucá; Cyro Delgado; Jorge Fernandes	7:32.78	Venezuela; Jean François; Antonio Sánchez; Rafael Vidal; Alberto Mestre	7:33.82
1987	United States; Paul Robinson; Brian Jones; Mike O'Brien; John Witchel	7:23.29	Canada; Darren Ward; Christopher Chalmers; Gary Vandermeulen; Mike Meldrum	7:29.84	Brazil; Jorge Fernandes; Cristiano Michelena; Cyro Delgado; Júlio López	7:29.90
1991	United States; John Keppeler; Jim Wells; Clay Tippins; Eric Diehl	7:23.39	Brazil; Teófilo Ferreira; Emanuel Nascimento; Cassiano Leal; Gustavo Borges	7:28.83	Puerto Rico; David Monasterio; Jorge Herrera; Manuel Guzmán; Ricardo Busquets	7:29.96
1995	United States; Jon Olsen; Josh Davis; Ryan Berube; Greg Burgess	7:21.61	Brazil; Fernando Scherer; Gustavo Borges; Cassiano Leal; Teófilo Ferreira	7:28.70	Mexico; Oscar Sotelo; Nelson Vargas; José Castellanos; Jorge Anaya	7:39.56
1999	United States; Adam Messner; Dan Phillips; Devin Howard; Scott Tucker	7:22.29	Brazil; Leonardo Costa; Rodrigo Castro; André Cordeiro; Gustavo Borges	7:22.92	Canada; Mark Johnston; Brian Johns; Yannick Lupien; Rick Say	7:23.02
2003	United States; Dan Ketchum; Jeff Lee; Ryan Lochte; Bryan Goldberg	7:18.93	Brazil; Carlos Jayme; Rafael Mosca; Gustavo Borges; Rodrigo Castro	7:25.17	Canada; Scott Dickens; Brian Edey; Tobias Oriwol; Colin Russell	7:27.18
2007	Brazil; Thiago Pereira; Rodrigo Castro; Lucas Salatta; Nicolas Oliveira	7:12.27	United States; Ricky Berens; Matthew Owen; Andy Grant; Robert Margalis	7:15.00	Canada; Chad Hankewich; Stefan Hirniak; Pascal Wollach; Adam Sioui	7:17.73
2011	United States; Conor Dwyer; Scot Robison; Charlie Houchin; Matt Patton; Daniel Madwed*; Ryan Feeley*; Rex Tullius*; Robert Margalis*	7:15.07	Brazil; André Schultz; Nicolas Oliveira; Leonardo de Deus; Thiago Pereira; Giuliano Rocco*; Lucas Kanieski*; Diogo Yabe*	7:21.96	Venezuela; Daniele Tirabassi; Cristian Quintero; Crox Acuña; Marcos Lavado; Eddy Marin*; Ricardo Monasterio*; Alejandro Gomez*	7:23.41
2015	Brazil; Luiz Altamir Melo; João de Lucca; Thiago Pereira; Nicolas Oliveira; Henrique Rodrigues*; Kaio de Almeida*; Thiago Simon*	7:11.15	United States; Michael Weiss; Michael Klueh; Gunnar Bentz; Darian Townsend; Ryan Feeley*; Bobby Bollier*	7:12.20	Canada; Jeremy Bagshaw; Alec Page; Stefan Milošević; Ryan Cochrane; Yuri Kisil*; Coleman Allen*	7:17.33
2019	Brazil; Luiz Altamir Melo; Fernando Scheffer; João de Lucca; Breno Correia	7:10.66	United States; Drew Kibler; Grant House; Samuel Pomajevich; Christopher Wieser	7:14.82	Mexico; Jorge Iga; Long Gutiérrez; José Martínez; Ricardo Vargas	7:19.43
2023	Brazil; Murilo Sartori; Breno Correia; Fernando Scheffer; Guilherme Costa; Luiz Altamir Melo*; Leonardo Coelho*; Felipe Ribeiro de Souza*	7:07.53	United States; Zane Grothe; Coby Carrozza; Brooks Curry; Jack Dahlgren; James Plage*; Mason Laur*; Lukas Miller*; Christopher O'Connor*	7:08.06	Canada; Jeremy Bagshaw; Finlay Knox; Alex Axon; Javier Acevedo; Yu Tong Wu*; Blake Tierney*; Raben Dommann*	7:14.76

=== 4×100 m medley ===
Games	Gold		Silver		Bronze	
1951	United States*; Allen Stack; Bowen Stassforth; Dick Cleveland	3:16.9	Argentina*; Pedro Galvão; Orlando Cossani; César Guardo	3:20.7	Mexico*; Alberto Isaac; Clemente Mejía; Luis Spamer	3:22.5
1955	United States; Frank McKinney; Fred Maguire; Leonide Baarcke; Clarke Scholes	4:29.1	Argentina; Pedro Galvão; Héctor Domínguez; Orlando Cossani; Federico Zwanck	4:33.4	Mexico; Clemente Mejía; Walter Ocampo; Eulalio Ríos Alemán; Otilio Olguín	4:35.5
1959	United States; Frank McKinney; Kenneth Nakasone; Mike Troy; Jeff Farrell	4:14.9	Canada; Cam Grout; Bob Wheaton; Steve Rabinovitch; Peter Fowler	4:23.3	Mexico; Eulalio Ríos Alemán; Alejandro Gaxiola; Jorge Escalante; Roberto Marmolejo	4:35.5
1963	United States; Richard McGeagh; Bill Craig; Walter Richardson; Nicholas Kirby	4:05.6	Argentina; Carlos van der Maath; Alberto Pérez; Luis Nicolao; Abel Pepe	4:17.3	Canada; Ed Casalet; John Kelso; Daniel Sherry; Sandy Gilchrist	4:25.0
1967	United States; Doug Russell; Russell Webb; Mark Spitz; Ken Walsh	3:59.31	Canada; Bill Mahony; Sandy Gilchrist; Ron Jacks; Jim Shaw	4:04.29	Brazil; Ilson Asturiano; João Costa Lima Neto; José Sylvio Fiolo; Waldyr Ramos	4:17.5
1971	United States; John Murphy; Brian Job; Jerry Heidenreich; Frank Heckl	3:56.08	Canada; John Hawes; Bill Mahony; Byron MacDonald; Robert Kasting	4:00.53	Brazil; César Lourenço; José Fiolo; Flávio Machado; José Aranha	4:06.64
1975	United States; Peter Rocca; Rick Colella; Michael Curington; Jack Babashoff	3:53.81	Canada; Mike Scarth; Camil Chevalier; Bruce Robertson; Gary MacDonald	3:58.95	Brazil; Akcel de Godoy; José Namorado; Rômulo Arantes; José Fiolo	3:59.05
1979	United States; Bob Jackson; Steve Lundquist; Bob Placak; David McCagg	3:47.40	Canada; Steve Pickell; Graham Smith; Dan Thompson; Bill Sawchuk	3:50.02	Puerto Rico; Carlos Berrocal; Orlando Catinchi; Arnaldo Pérez; Fernando Cañales	3:54.63
1983	United States; Rick Carey; Steve Lundquist; Matt Gribble; Rowdy Gaines	3:40.42	Canada; Mike West; Marco Veilleux; Tom Ponting; David Churchill	3:48.10	Venezuela; Giovanni Frigo; Glen Sochasky; Rafael Vidal; Alberto Mestre	3:50.52
1987	United States; Andrew Gill; Richard Korhammer; Wade King; Todd Dudley	3:43.65	Canada; Ray Brown; Darcy Wallingford; Darren Ward; Claude Lamy	3:49.77	Brazil; Jorge Fernandes; Otavio Silva; Cícero Tortelli; Ricardo Prado	3:50.29
1991	United States; Andrew Gill; Hans Dersch; Mike Merrell; Joel Thomas	3:42.84	Puerto Rico; David Monasterio; Jorge Herrera; Todd Torres; Ricardo Busquets	3:45.78	Cuba; Rodolfo Falcón; Mario González; José Ulises Hernández; René Sáez	3:45.96
1995	United States; Jeff Rouse; Seth Van Neerden; Mark Henderson; Jon Olsen	3:41.24	Brazil; Rogério Romero; Oscar Godoi; Eduardo Piccinini; Gustavo Borges	3:43.93	Canada; Chris Renaud; Jonathan Cleveland; Edward Parenti; Curtis Myden	3:45.10
1999	Brazil; Alexandre Massura; Marcelo Tomazini; Fernando Scherer; Gustavo Borges	3:40.27	United States; Matt Allen; Ed Moses; Jarod Schroeder; Scott Tucker	3:40.57	Canada; Mark Versfeld; Morgan Knabe; Shamek Pietucha; Yannick Lupien	3:41.04
2003	United States; Peter Marshall; Mark Gangloff; Ben Michaelson; Nick Brunelli	3:37.27	Brazil; Paulo Machado; Eduardo Fischer; Kaio de Almeida; Gustavo Borges	3:40.02	Canada; Sean Sepulis; Scott Dickens; Chad Murray; Matt Rose	3:40.12
2007	United States; Randall Bal; Mark Gangloff; Ricky Berens; Andy Grant; Peter Marshall*; Christian Schurr Voight*; Pat O'Neil*; Alex Righi*	3:34.37	Brazil; Thiago Pereira; Henrique Barbosa; Kaio de Almeida; César Cielo; Lucas Salatta*; Felipe Lima*; Gabriel Mangabeira*; Eduardo Deboni*	3:35.81	Canada; Matthew Hawes; Scott Dickens; Joe Bartoch; Adam Sioui; Mathieu Bois*; Chad Hankewich*	3:38.16
2011	Brazil; Guilherme Guido; Felipe França Silva; Gabriel Mangabeira; César Cielo; Thiago Pereira*; Felipe Lima*; Kaio de Almeida*; Bruno Fratus*	3:34.58	United States; Eugene Godsoe; Marcus Titus; Chris Brady; Scot Robison; David Russell*; Kevin Swander*; Bobby Savulich*	3:37.17	Argentina; Federico Grabich; Lucas Peralta; Marcos Barale; Lucas Del Piccolo	3:44.51
2015	Brazil; Guilherme Guido; Felipe França Silva; Arthur Mendes; Marcelo Chierighini; Thiago Pereira*; Felipe Lima*	3:32.68	United States; Nick Thoman; Brad Craig; Gilles Smith; Josh Schneider; Eugene Godsoe*; Michael Weiss*	3:33.63	Canada; Russell Wood; Richard Funk; Santo Condorelli; Yuri Kisil; James Dergousoff*; Coleman Allen*	3:34.40
2019	United States; Daniel Carr; Nicolas Fink; Tom Shields; Nathan Adrian; Nick Alexander*; Matthew Josa*; Michael Chadwick*	3:30.25	Brazil; Guilherme Guido; João Gomes Júnior; Vinicius Lanza; Marcelo Chierighini; Leonardo de Deus*; Felipe Lima*; Luiz Altamir Melo*; Breno Correia*	3:30.98	Argentina; Agustin Hernandez; Gabriel Morelli; Santiago Grassi; Federico Grabich; Nicolas Deferrari*; Guido Buscaglia*	3:38.41
2023	United States; Jack Aikins; Jacob Foster; Lukas Miller; Jonny Kulow; Christopher O'Connor*; Noah Nichols*; Jack Dahlgren*; Coby Carrozza*	3:33.29	Brazil; Guilherme Basseto; João Gomes Júnior; Vinicius Lanza; Guilherme Caribé; Gabriel Fantoni*; Raphael Windmuller*; Victor Baganha*; Victor Alcará*	3:35.12	Canada; Blake Tierney; Gabe Mastromatteo; Finlay Knox; Javier Acevedo; Raben Dommann*; Brayden Taivassalo*; Keir Ogilvie*; Édouard Fullum-Huot*	3:35.72

* The 1951 event was not a 4 × 100 m but a 3×100m medley relay

=== 10 km marathon ===
Games	Gold		Silver		Bronze	
2007	(United States) Fran Crippen	2:02:24.1	(United States) Chip Peterson	2:02:29.2	(Brazil) Allan do Carmo	2:03:53.7
2011	(Canada) Richard Weinberger	1:57:31.0	(United States) Arthur Frayler	1:57:31.3	(Argentina) Guillermo Bertola	1:57:33.9
2015	(United States) Chip Peterson	1:54:03.6	(United States) David Heron	1:54:07.4	(Ecuador) Esteban Enderica	1:54:09.2
2019	(Ecuador) Esteban Enderica	1:53:46.7	(United States) Taylor Abbott	1:54:02.7	(Brazil) Victor Colonese	1:54:03.6
2023	(United States) Brennan Gravley	1:50:23.4	(Argentina) Franco Cassini	1:50:23.6	(Mexico) Paulo Strehlke	1:50:23.8

== Women's events ==
=== 50 m freestyle ===
Games	Gold		Silver		Bronze	
1987	(United States) Jenny Thompson	26.09	(Costa Rica) Silvia Poll	26.32	(United States) Jeanne Doolan	26.34
1991	(Canada) Kristin Topham	26.01	(United States) Heather Hageman	26.26	(United States) Allison Bock	26.45
1995	(United States) Angel Martino	25.40	(Canada) Shannon Shakespeare	26.19	(Canada) Andrea Moody	26.54
1999	(United States) Tammie Spatz	25.50	(Panama) Eileen Coparropa	25.78	(Canada) Laura Nicholls	26.10
2003	(United States) Kara Lynn Joyce	25.24	(Brazil) Flávia Delaroli	25.44	(Panama) Eileen Coparropa	25.62
2007	(Venezuela) Arlene Semeco	25.14	(Puerto Rico) Vanessa García	25.22	(Brazil) Flávia Delaroli	25.46
2011	(United States) Lara Jackson	25.09	(Brazil) Graciele Herrmann	25.23	(United States) Madison Kennedy	25.24
2015	(The Bahamas) Arianna Vanderpool-Wallace	24.38	(Brazil) Etiene Medeiros	24.55	(United States) Natalie Coughlin	24.66
2019	(Brazil) Etiene Medeiros	24.88	(United States) Margo Geer	25.03	(United States) Madison Kennedy	25.14
2023	(Canada) Maggie Mac Neil (United States) Gabriela Albiero	24.84	Not awarded		(United States) Catie Deloof	24.88

=== 100 m freestyle ===
Games	Gold		Silver		Bronze	
1951	(United States) Sharon Geary	1:08:4	(United States) Jackie LaVine	1:09.9	(Argentina) Ana María Schultz	1:10.7
1955	(Canada) Helen Stewart	1:07.7	(United States) Wanda Werner	1:07.7	(Canada) Virginia Grant	1:08.3
1959	(United States) Chris von Saltza	1:03.8	(United States) Molly Botkin	1:05.7	(United States) Joan Spillane	1:05.8
1963	(United States) Terri Stickles	1:02.8	(Canada) Mary Stewart	1:03.3	(United States) Kathy Ellis	1:03.5
1967	(United States) Erika Bricker	1:00.89	(Canada) Marion Lay	1:01.02	(United States) Lillian Watson	1:01.54
1971	(United States) Sandy Neilson	1:00.60	(United States) Angela Coughlan	1:01.15	(Canada) Karen James	1:01.88
1975	(United States) Kim Peyton	58.24	(United States) Jill Sterkel	58.57	(Canada) Jill Quirk	58.92
1979	(United States) Cynthia Woodhead	56.22	(United States) Jill Sterkel	56.24	(Canada) Gail Amundrud	57.79
1983	(United States) Carrie Steinseifer	56.92	(Canada) Jane Kerr	57.51	(Canada) Kathy Bald	57.76
1987	(Costa Rica) Silvia Poll	56.39	(United States) Sara Linke	57.30	(United States) Jenny Thompson	57.46
1991	(United States) Ashley Tappin	56.51	(United States) Megan Oesting	57.14	(Canada) Kristin Topham	57.63
1995	(United States) Angel Martino	55.62	(United States) Amy Van Dyken	55.92	(Canada) Marianne Limpert	56.80
1999	(Canada) Laura Nicholls	56.25	(United States) Tammie Spatz	56.44	(Canada) Marianne Limpert	56.69
2003	(United States) Courtney Shealy	55.61	(United States) Christina Swindle (Argentina) Florencia Szigeti	55.92	Not awarded	
2007	(Venezuela) Arlene Semeco	55.17	(Brazil) Flávia Delaroli	55.78	(Puerto Rico) Vanessa García	55.84
2011	(United States) Amanda Kendall	54.75	(United States) Erika Erndl	55.04	(Venezuela) Arlene Semeco	55.43
2015	(Canada) Chantal Van Landeghem	54.83	(United States) Natalie Coughlin	54.06	(The Bahamas) Arianna Vanderpool-Wallace	54.15
2019	(United States) Margo Geer	54.17	(Canada) Alexia Zevnik	55.04	(Brazil) Larissa Oliveira	55.25
2023	(Canada) Maggie Mac Neil	53.64	(Brazil) Stephanie Balduccini	54.13	(United States) Catie DeLoof	54.50

=== 200 m freestyle ===
Games	Gold		Silver		Bronze	
1951	(Argentina) Ana María Schultz	2:32.4	(United States) Betty Brey	2:33.3	(Argentina) Eileen Holt	2:36.5
1955	(United States) Wanda Werner	2:32.5	(Argentina) Liliana Gonzalias	2:32.9	(Mexico) Gilda Aranda	2:33.6
1959	(United States) Chris von Saltza	2:18.5	(United States) Shirley Stobs	2:22.9	(United States) Joan Spillane	2:23.0
1963	(United States) Robyn Johnson	2:17.5	(United States) Terri Stickles	2:18.4	(Canada) Lynne Pomfret	2:28.4
1967	(United States) Pam Kruse	2:11.91	(Canada) Marion Lay	2:14.68	(Canada) Angela Coughlan	2:15.66
1971	(United States) Kim Peyton	2:09.62	(Canada) Angela Coughlan	2:10.56	(Colombia) Olga de Angulo	2:14.34
1975	(United States) Kim Peyton	2:04.57	(Canada) Gail Amundrud	2:05.87	(Canada) Anne Jardin	2:07.68
1979	(United States) Cynthia Woodhead	1:58.43	(United States) Kim Linehan	2:01.92	(Canada) Gail Amundrud	2:03.38
1983	(United States) Cynthia Woodhead	2:01.33	(United States) Mary Wayte	2:02.21	(Canada) Julie Daigneault	2:02.36
1987	(Costa Rica) Silvia Poll	2:00.02	(United States) Whitney Hedgepeth	2:02.06	(United States) Sara Linke	2:04.00
1991	(United States) Lisa Jacob	2:02.06	(United States) Barbara Metz	2:02.92	(Canada) Kim Paton	2:04.73
1995	(United States) Cristina Teuscher	2:01.49	(Canada) Marianne Limpert	2:02.05	(United States) Dady Vincent	2:03.37
1999	(Canada) Jessica Deglau	2:00.65	(Jamaica) Janelle Atkinson	2:01.11	(United States) Talor Bendel	2:03.18
2003	(United States) Dana Vollmer	1:59.80	(United States) Colleen Lanne	2:01.98	(Brazil) Mariana Brochado	2:02.08
2007	(United States) Ava Ohlgren	2:00.03	(Canada) Stephanie Horner	2:00.29	(Brazil) Monique Ferreira	2:01.38
2011	(United States) Catherine Breed	2:00.08	(United States) Chelsea Nauta	2:00.62	(Venezuela) Andreina Pinto	2:00.79
2015	(United States) Allison Schmitt	1:56.23	(Canada) Emily Overholt	1:57.55	(Brazil) Manuella Lyrio	1:58.03
2019	(United States) Claire Rasmus	1:58.64	(United States) Meghan Raab	1:58.70	(Brazil) Larissa Oliveira	1:59.78
2023	(Canada) Mary-Sophie Harvey	1:58.08	(Brazil) Maria Fernanda Costa	1:58.12	(United States) Camille Spink	1:58.61

=== 400 m freestyle ===
Games	Gold		Silver		Bronze	
1951	(Argentina) Ana María Schultz	5:26.7	(United States) Carolyn Green	5:33.1	(Brazil) Piedade Coutinho	5:33.6
1955	(Canada) Beth Whittall	5:32.4	(United States) Carolyn Green	5:34.7	(United States) Carol Tait	5:34.9
1959	(United States) Chris von Saltza	4:55.9	(United States) Sylvia Ruuska	5:03.4	(United States) Donna Graham	5:03.5
1963	(United States) Sharon Finneran	4:52.7	(United States) Robyn Johnson	4:56.1	(Canada) Lynne Pomfret	5:20.4
1967	(United States) Debbie Meyer	4:32.64	(United States) Pam Kruse	4:42.81	(Canada) Angela Coughlan	4:48.88
1971	(United States) Ann Simmons	4:26.19	(United States) Jill Strong	4:36.15	(Canada) Angela Coughlan	4:38.86
1975	(United States) Kathy Heddy	4:23.00	(United States) Kathie Wickstrand	4:27.66	(Canada) Michele Oliver	4:30.20
1979	(United States) Cynthia Woodhead	4:10.56	(United States) Tracy Caulkins	4:16.13	(Canada) Wendy Quirk	4:17.34
1983	(United States) Tiffany Cohen	4:12.27	(United States) Cynthia Woodhead	4:14.07	(Canada) Julie Daigneault	4:19.91
1987	(United States) Julie Martin	4:11.87	(United States) Barbara Metz	4:13.25	(Canada) Megan Holliday	4:20.78
1991	(United States) Jane Skillman	4:13.69	(United States) Barbara Metz	4:16.90	(Canada) Tara-Lynn Seymour	4:22.15
1995	(United States) Brooke Bennett	4:11.78	(United States) Cristina Teuscher	4:13.97	(Canada) Katie Brambley	4:18.74
1999	(United States) Kaitlin Sandeno	4:10.74	(Jamaica) Janelle Atkinson	4:10.83	(Canada) Joanne Malar	4:12.64
2003	(United States) Elizabeth Hill	4:10.18	(United States) Morgan Hentzen	4:13.03	(Brazil) Monique Ferreira	4:14.21
2007	(United States) Jessica Rodriquez	4:12.22	(Mexico) Patricia Castañeda	4:13.34	(United States) Corinne Showalter	4:13.72
2011	(United States) Gillian Ryan	4:11.58	(Venezuela) Andreina Pinto	4:11.81	(Chile) Kristel Köbrich	4:13.31
2015	(Canada) Emily Overholt	4:08.42	(Venezuela) Andreina Pinto	4:08.67	(United States) Gillian Ryan	4:09.46
2019	(Argentina) Delfina Pignatiello	4:10.86	(Canada) Danica Ludlow	4:11.97	(Canada) Alyson Ackman	4:12.05
2023	(United States) Paige Madden	4:06.45	(Brazil) Maria Fernanda Costa	4:06.68	(Brazil) Gabrielle Roncatto	4:06.88

=== 800 m freestyle ===
Games	Gold		Silver		Bronze	
1967	(United States) Debbie Meyer	9:22.86	(United States) Susan Pedersen	9:38.37	(Canada) Angela Coughlan	9:48.56
1971	(United States) Cathy Calhoun	9:15.19	(United States) Cynthia Enze	9:32.15	(Mexico) Maria Teresa Ramírez	9:44.32
1975	(United States) Wendy Weinberg	9:05.57	(United States) Mary Montgomery	9:06.70	(Canada) Janice Stenhouse	9:17.87
1979	(United States) Kim Linehan	8:39.82	(United States) Jennifer Hooker	8:50.71	(Canada) Barbara Shockey	8:54.82
1983	(United States) Tiffany Cohen	8:35.42	(United States) Marybeth Linzmeier	8:41.26	(Canada) Julie Daigneault	8:59.52
1987	(United States) Tami Bruce	8:34.72	(United States) Deborah Babashoff	8:42.77	(Canada) Megan Holliday	8:52.60
1991	(United States) Jane Skillman	8:43.26	(United States) Lisa Jacob	8:51.36	(Canada) Tara-Lynn Seymour	8:52.33
1995	(United States) Trina Jackson	8:35.42	(United States) Brooke Bennett	8:47.99	(Argentina) Alicia Barrancos	8:49.57
1999	(United States) Kaitlin Sandeno	8:34.65	(Jamaica) Janelle Atkinson	8:39.51	(Canada) Lindsay Beavers	8:44.21
2003	(United States) Morgan Hentzen	8:36.54	(United States) Rachael Burke	8:37.61	(Chile) Kristel Köbrich	8:43.90
2007	(United States) Caroline Burckle	8:35.10	(Mexico) Patricia Castañeda	8:38.92	(Canada) Savannah King	8:39.36
2011	(Chile) Kristel Köbrich	8:34.71	(United States) Ashley Twichell	8:38.38	(Venezuela) Andreina Pinto	8:44.55
2015	(United States) Sierra Schmidt	8:27.54	(Chile) Kristel Köbrich	8:29.79	(Venezuela) Andreina Pinto	8:31.08
2019	(Argentina) Delfina Pignatiello	8:29.42	(United States) Mariah Denigan	8:34.18	(Brazil) Viviane Jungblut	8:36.04
2023	(United States) Paige Madden	8:27.99	(United States) Rachel Stege	8:28.50	(Brazil) Viviane Jungblut	8:33.55

=== 1500 m freestyle ===
Games	Gold		Silver		Bronze	
2019	(Argentina) Delfina Pignatiello	16:16.54	(Chile) Kristel Köbrich	16:18.19	(United States) Rebecca Mann	16:23.23
2023	(United States) Rachel Stege	16:13.59	(Chile) Kristel Köbrich	16:14.59	(Brazil) Viviane Jungblut	16:19.89

=== 100 m backstroke ===
Games	Gold		Silver		Bronze	
1951	(United States) Maureen O'Brien	1:18.5	(United States) Sheila Donahue	1:20.5	(Mexico) Magda Bruggemann	1:21.4
1955	(Canada) Leonore Fisher	1:16.7	(United States) Coralie O'Connor	1:17.8	(United States) Cynthia Gill	1:17.9
1959	(United States) Carin Cone	1:12.2	(Canada) Sara Barber	1:12.3	(United States) Christine Kluter	1:12.4
1963	(United States) Nina Harmer	1:11.5	(United States) Cathy Ferguson	1:13.1	(Canada) Eileen Weir	1:14.5
1967	(Canada) Elaine Tanner	1:07.32	(United States) Kaye Hall	1:09.76	(Canada) Shirley Cazalet	1:11.33
1971	(Canada) Donna Gurr	1:07.18	(United States) Susie Atwood	1:07.51	(United States) Jill Hlay	1:08.49
1975	(Canada) Lynn Chénard	1:06.59	(United States) Rosemary Boone	1:07.18	(United States) Jenny Kemp	1:07.29
1979	(United States) Linda Jezek	1:03.33	(Canada) Cheryl Gibson	1:05.17	(Mexico) Teresa Rivera	1:06.87
1983	(United States) Susan Walsh	1:02.48	(United States) Joan Pennington	1:03.63	(Canada) Barbara McBain	1:05.38
1987	(Costa Rica) Silvia Poll	1:02.18	(United States) Holly Green	1:03.15	(United States) Michelle Donahue	1:03.30
1991	(Costa Rica) Silvia Poll	1:03.15	(Canada) Nikki Dryden	1:03.64	(United States) Jodi Wilson	1:03.78
1995	(United States) Barbara Bedford	1:01.71	(United States) Kristy Heydanek	1:03.10	(Brazil) Fabíola Molina	1:04.85
1999	(Canada) Kelly Stefanyshyn	1:02.14	(United States) Denali Knapp	1:02.45	(United States) Beth Botsford	1:02.48
2003	(United States) Diana MacManus	1:02.50	(United States) Courtney Shealy	1:02.74	(Guatemala) Gisela Morales	1:04.56
2007	(United States) Julia Smit	1:02.01	(Brazil) Fabíola Molina	1:02.18	(Canada) Elizabeth Wycliffe	1:02.46
2011	(United States) Rachel Bootsma	1:00.37	(United States) Elizabeth Pelton	1:01.12	(Mexico) Fernanda González	1:02.00
2015	(Brazil) Etiene Medeiros	59.61	(United States) Olivia Smoliga	1:00.06	(United States) Clara Smiddy	1:00.49
2019	(United States) Phoebe Bacon	59.47	(Canada) Danielle Hanus	1:00.34	(Brazil) Etiene Medeiros	1:00.67
2023	(United States) Josephine Fuller	59.67	(United States) Kennedy Noble	59.84	(Canada) Danielle Hanus	1:01.49

=== 200 m backstroke ===
Games	Gold		Silver		Bronze	
1967	(Canada) Elaine Tanner	2:24.55	(United States) Kendis Moore	2:30.38	(United States) Cathy Ferguson	2:32.48
1971	(Canada) Donna Gurr	2:24.73	(United States) Susie Atwood	2:26.48	(United States) Barbara Darby	2:30.73
1975	(United States) Donna Lee Wennerstrom	2:19.93	(Canada) Lynn Chénard	2:21.26	(Canada) Cheryl Gibson	2:22.68
1979	(United States) Linda Jezek	2:16.07	(Canada) Cheryl Gibson	2:17.58	(United States) Libby Kinkead	2:20.19
1983	(United States) Amy White	2:15.66	(United States) Susan Walsh	2:15.94	(Canada) Barbara McBain	2:18.93
1987	(United States) Katie Welch	2:13.65	(Costa Rica) Silvia Poll	2:14.18	(United States) Holly Green	2:14.75
1991	(United States) Diana Trimble	2:15.80	(Canada) Nikki Dryden	2:16.13	(Canada) Joanne Malar	2:16.36
1995	(United States) Barbara Bedford	2:12.98	(United States) Rachel Joseph	2:14.74	(Canada) Joanne Malar	2:16.67
1999	(United States) Denali Knapp	2:12.48	(United States) Beth Botsford	2:12.95	(Canada) Kelly Stefanyshyn	2:13.24
2003	(United States) Jamie Reid	2:13.89	(United States) Diana MacManus	2:15.39	(Guatemala) Gisela Morales	2:16.19
2007	(United States) Teresa Crippen	2:10.57	(United States) Julia Smit	2:11.18	(Canada) Elizabeth Wycliffe	2:13.29
2011	(United States) Elizabeth Pelton	2:08.99	(United States) Bonnie Brandon	2:12.57	(Mexico) Fernanda González	2:13.56
2015	(Canada) Hilary Caldwell	2.08.22	(Canada) Dominique Bouchard	2:09.74	(United States) Clara Smiddy	2:11.47
2019	(United States) Alexandra Walsh	2:08.30	(United States) Isabelle Stadden	2:08.39	(Canada) Mackenzie Glover	2:10.95
2023	(United States) Kennedy Noble	2:08.03	(United States) Reilly Tiltmann	2:12.79	(Brazil) Alexia Assunção	2:13.31

=== 100 m breaststroke ===
Games	Gold		Silver		Bronze	
1967	(United States) Catie Ball	1:14.80	(Uruguay) Ana María Norbis	1:15.95	(United States) Cynthia Goyette	1:19.39
1971	(Canada) Sylvia Dockerill	1:18.63	(United States) Linda Kurtz	1:19.30	(United States) Lynn Colella	1:19.72
1975	(United States) Lauri Siering	1:15.17	(United States) Marcia Morey	1:16.25	(Canada) Marian Stuart	1:16.40
1979	(United States) Tami Paumier	1:12.20	(United States) Tracy Caulkins	1:12.52	(Canada) Anne Gagnon	1:14.38
1983	(Canada) Anne Ottenbrite	1:10.63	(Canada) Kathy Bald	1:11.98	(United States) Kim Rhodenbaugh	1:12.16
1987	(Canada) Keltie Duggan	1:12.46	(United States) Lori Heisick	1:12.52	(United States) Terri Baxter	1:12.99
1991	(United States) Dorsey Tierney	1:10.30	(United States) Lydia Morrow	1:11.00	(Canada) Lisa Flood	1:11.75
1995	(Canada) Lisa Flood	1:10.36	(Canada) Guylaine Cloutier	1:10.44	(United States) Kelli King-Bednar	1:11.44
1999	(United States) Staciana Stitts	1:09.16	(United States) Kristen Woodring	1:09.65	(Canada) Lauren van Oosten	1:10.06
2003	(United States) Staciana Stitts	1:09.01	(United States) Corrie Clark	1:10.09	(Canada) Kathleen Stoody	1:10.56
2007	(United States) Michelle McKeehan	1:08.49	(Canada) Annamay Pierse	1:08.72	(United States) Elizabeth Tinnon	1:09.18
2011	(United States) Annie Chandler	1:07.90	(United States) Ashley Wanland	1:08.55	(Canada) Ashley McGregor	1:08.96
2015	(United States) Katie Meili	1:06.26	(Jamaica) Alia Atkinson	1:06.59	(Canada) Rachel Nicol	1:07.91
2019	(United States) Anne Lazor	1:06.94	(Argentina) Julia Sebastián	1:07.09	(Canada) Faith Knelson	1:07.42
2023	(Canada) Rachel Nicol	1:07.28	(Canada) Sophie Angus	1:07.55	(Argentina) Macarena Ceballos	1:07.68

=== 200 m breaststroke ===
Games	Gold		Silver		Bronze	
1951	(Argentina) Dorotea Turnbull	3:08.4	(Argentina) Beatriz Rohde	3:10.3	(United States) Penny Pence	3:14.7
1955	(United States) Mary Lou Elsenius	3:08.4	(United States) Mary Sears	3:09.0	(Argentina) Beatriz Rohde	3:09.4
1959	(United States) Anne Warner	2:56.8	(United States) Patty Kempner	3:00.1	(United States) Anne Brancroft	3:01.3
1963	(United States) Alice Driscoll	2:56.2	(United States) Roby Whipple	2:57.7	(Canada) Marjon Wilmink	3:00.0
1967	(United States) Catie Ball	2:42.18	(United States) Claudia Kolb	2:48.93	(Uruguay) Ana María Norbis	2:52.11
1971	(United States) Lynn Colella	2:50.03	(Canada) Jane Wright	2:50.96	(Mexico) Leonor Urueta	2:52.72
1975	(United States) Lauri Siering	2:42.35	(Canada) Joann Baker	2:42.96	(United States) Marcia Morey	2:45.58
1979	(Canada) Anne Gagnon	2:35.75	(Canada) Joanne Bédard	2:40.22	(United States) Patricia Speeds	2:40.79
1983	(Canada) Kathy Bald	2:35.53	(United States) Susan Rapp	2:37.91	(United States) Kim Rhodenbaugh	2:39.03
1987	(United States) Dorsey Tierney	2:36.87	(Argentina) Alicia Boscatto	2:37.09	(United States) Kathy Smith	2:37.57
1991	(United States) Dorsey Tierney	2:28.69	(United States) Chantal Dubois	2:33.62	(Canada) Lisa Flood	2:34.08
1995	(Canada) Lisa Flood	2:31.33	(Canada) Guylaine Cloutier	2:32.43	(United States) Anita Nall	2:32.82
1999	(Canada) Lauren van Oosten	2:30.36	(United States) Annemieke McReynolds	2:30.53	(United States) Katie Yevak	2:32.85
2003	(United States) Alexi Spann	2:13.89	(Canada) Lisa Blackburn	2:15.39	(Canada) Kathleen Stoody	2:16.19
2007	(United States) Caitlin Leverenz	2:25.62	(Canada) Annamay Pierse	2:26.79	(United States) Keri Hehn	2:28.20
2011	(Canada) Ashley McGregor	2:28.04	(United States) Haley Spencer	2:29.30	(United States) Michelle McKeehan	2:30.51
2015	(Canada) Kierra Smith	2:24.38	(Canada) Martha McCabe	2:24.51	(United States) Anne Lazor	2:26.24
2019	(United States) Anne Lazor	2:21.40	(United States) Bethany Galat	2:21.84	(Argentina) Julia Sebastián	2:25.43
2023	(Canada) Sydney Pickrem	2:23.39	(Canada) Kelsey Wog	2:23.49	(Brazil) Gabrielle Assis	2:25.52

=== 100 m butterfly ===
Games	Gold		Silver		Bronze	
1955	(Canada) Beth Whittall	1:16.2	(United States) Betty Brey	1:16.5	(United States) Shelley Mann	1:17.7
1959	(United States) Becky Collins	1:09.5	(United States) Nancy Ramey	1:10.4	(United States) Molly Botkin	1:12.3
1963	(United States) Kathy Ellis	1:07.6	(Canada) Mary Stewart	1:08.9	(United States) Kim Worley	1:11.6
1967	(United States) Ellie Daniel	1:05.24	(Canada) Elaine Tanner	1:05.35	(Canada) Marilyn Corson	1:07.68
1971	(United States) Deena Deardurff	1:06.22	(Canada) Leslie Cliff	1:07.77	(Brazil) Lucy Burle	1:08.79
1975	(United States) Camille Wright	1:02.71	(United States) Peggy Tosdal	1:03.37	(Canada) Wendy Quirk	1:05.07
1979	(United States) Jill Sterkel	1:00.53	(United States) Lisa Buese	1:00.59	(Canada) Nancy Garapick	1:02.96
1983	(United States) Laurie Lehner	1:01.14	(Canada) Michelle MacPherson	1:01.63	(United States) Patty King	1:01.96
1987	(United States) Janel Jorgensen	1:01.28	(United States) Kristen Elias	1:01.54	(Canada) Robin Ruggiero	1:03.67
1991	(United States) Diana Trimble	2:15.80	(Canada) Nikki Dryden	2:16.13	(Canada) Joanne Malar	2:16.36
1995	(United States) Amy Van Dyken	1:00.71	(Brazil) Gabrielle Rose	1:01.67	(United States) Angie Wester-Krieg	1:02.79
1999	(United States) Karen Campbell	1:00.05	(Canada) Jessica Deglau	1:00.70	(Canada) Karine Chevrier	1:01.15
2003	(United States) Bettany Goodwin	59.97	(Canada) Audrey Lacroix	1:00.18	(United States) Dana Kirk	1:00.51
2007	(United States) Kathleen Hersey	59.21	(United States) Samantha Woodward	59.98	(Brazil) Gabriella Silva	1:00.50
2011	(United States) Claire Donahue	58.73	(Brazil) Daynara de Paula	59.30	(United States) Elaine Breeden	59.81
2015	(United States) Kelsi Worrell	57.78	(Canada) Noemie Thomas	58.00	(Canada) Katerine Savard	58.05
2019	(United States) Kendyl Stewart	58.49	(Canada) Danielle Hanus	58.93	(United States) Sarah Gibson	59.11
2023	(Canada) Maggie Mac Neil	56.94	(United States) Kelly Pash	57.85	(United States) Olivia Bray	58.36

=== 200 m butterfly ===
Games	Gold		Silver		Bronze	
1967	(United States) Claudia Kolb	2:25.49	(United States) Lee Davis	2:26.74	(Canada) Marilyn Corson	2:30.54
1971	(United States) Lynn Colella	2:23.11	(United States) Alice Jones	2:28.10	(Canada) Susan Smith	2:32.60
1975	(United States) Camille Wright	2:18.57	(Canada) Cheryl Gibson	2:21.95	(Brazil) Rosemary Ribeiro	2:22.47
1979	(United States) Mary T. Meagher	2:09.77	(Canada) Karinne Miller	2:15.05	(Canada) Nancy Garapick	2:16.40
1983	(United States) Mary T. Meagher	2:10.06	(United States) Tracy Caulkins	2:14.15	(Canada) Marie Moore	2:14.51
1987	(United States) Kara McGrath	2:12.54	(United States) Michelle Griglione	2:15.03	(Canada) Shay McNicol	2:17.78
1991	(United States) Susan Gottlieb	2:12.35	(United States) Angie Wester-Krieg	2:14.55	(Canada) Beth Hazel	2:14.91
1995	(United States) Trina Jackson	2:12.37	(United States) Michelle Griglione	2:14.94	(Argentina) María Pereyra	2:18.52
1999	(Canada) Jessica Deglau	2:09.64	(Canada) Jen Button	2:12.09	(United States) Kalyn Keller	2:14.60
2003	(Canada) Audrey Lacroix	2:11.02	(Canada) Noelle Bassi	2:12.81	(United States) Dana Kirk	2:12.85
2007	(United States) Kathleen Hersey	2:07.64	(United States) Courtney Kalisz	2:12.75	(Brazil) Daiene Dias	2:13.35
2011	(United States) Kim Vandenberg	2:10.54	(United States) Lyndsay DePaul	2:12.34	(Mexico) Rita Medrano	2:12.43
2015	(Canada) Audrey Lacroix	2:07.68	(United States) Katherine Mills	2:09.31	(Brazil) Joanna Maranhão	2:09.38
2019	(Argentina) Virginia Bardach	2:10.87	(Canada) Mary-Sophie Harvey	2:11.68	(United States) Meghan Small	2:12.51
2023	(United States) Dakota Luther	2:09.97	(Mexico) María José Mata	2:10.25	(United States) Kelly Pash	2:10.30

=== 200 m individual medley ===
Games	Gold		Silver		Bronze	
1967	(United States) Claudia Kolb	2:26.06	(United States) Susan Pedersen	2:30.91	(Canada) Sandra Dowler	2:36.18
1971	(Canada) Leslie Cliff	2:30.03	(United States) Susie Atwood	2:30.29	(United States) Cindy Plaisted	2:33.23
1975	(United States) Kathy Heddy	2:22.22	(United States) Jennie Franks	2:23.37	(Canada) Cheryl Gibson	2:24.22
1979	(United States) Tracy Caulkins	2:16.11	(Canada) Nancy Garapick	2:19.36	(United States) Anne Tweedy	2:20.33
1983	(United States) Tracy Caulkins	2:16.22	(Canada) Michelle MacPherson	2:18.22	(United States) Susan Rapp	2:18.76
1987	(United States) Susan Habermas	2:18.22	(United States) Catherine Ritch	2:20.06	(Canada) Karin Helmstaedt	2:21.59
1991	(United States) Lisa Summers	2:16.86	(Canada) Joanne Malar	2:19.14	(United States) Jennifer Toton	2:19.56
1995	(Canada) Joanne Malar	2:15.66	(Canada) Marianne Limpert	2:16.13	(United States) Alison Fealey	2:17.14
1999	(Canada) Joanne Malar	2:14.18	(United States) Martha Bowen	2:15.26	(Canada) Marianne Limpert	2:15.80
2003	(Canada) Joanne Malar	2:15.93	(United States) Corrie Clark	2:16.78	(United States) Laura Davis	2:17.33
2007	(United States) Julia Smit	2:13.07	(United States) Emily Kukors	2:13.88	(Canada) Stephanie Horner	2:15.42
2011	(United States) Julia Smit	2:13.73	(Jamaica) Alia Atkinson	2:14.75	(Brazil) Joanna Maranhão	2:15.08
2015	(United States) Caitlin Leverenz	2:10.51	(United States) Meghan Small	2:11.26	(Canada) Sydney Pickrem	2:11.29
2019	(United States) Alexandra Walsh	2:11.24	(United States) Meghan Small	2:11.36	(Canada) Bailey Andison	2:14.14
2023	(Canada) Sydney Pickrem	2:09.04	(Canada) Mary-Sophie Harvey	2:11.92	(United States) Kennedy Noble	2:14.19

=== 400 m individual medley ===
Games	Gold		Silver		Bronze	
1967	(United States) Claudia Kolb	5:09.68	(United States) Susan Pedersen	5:21.57	(Canada) Marilyn Corson	5:36.75
1971	(Canada) Leslie Cliff	5:13.31	(United States) Cindy Plaisted	5:13.64	(United States) Susie Atwood	5:13.75
1975	(United States) Kathy Heddy	5:06.05	(Canada) Cheryl Gibson	5:06.87	(United States) Jennie Franks	5:08.68
1979	(United States) Tracy Caulkins	4:46.05	(United States) Anne Tweedy	4:47.19	(Canada) Nancy Garapick	4:53.37
1983	(United States) Tracy Caulkins	4:51.82	(United States) Polly Winde	4:54.11	(Canada) Michelle MacPherson	4:54.86
1987	(United States) Tami Bruce	4:49.34	(United States) Katie Welch	4:51.32	(Canada) Karin Helmstaedt	4:57.04
1991	(United States) Amy Shaw	4:50.39	(Canada) Joanne Malar	4:51.27	(United States) Brandy Wood	4:52.38
1995	(Canada) Joanne Malar	4:43.64	(United States) Alison Fealey	4:48.31	(United States) Jenny Kurth	4:57.24
1999	(Canada) Joanne Malar	4:38.46	(United States) Martha Bowen	4:49.22	(Suriname) Carolyn Adel	4:50.41
2003	(Argentina) Georgina Bardach	4:43.40	(United States) Kristen Caverly	4:46.18	(Brazil) Joanna Maranhão	4:46.38
2007	(United States) Kathleen Hersey	4:44.08	(United States) Teresa Crippen	4:46.18	(Argentina) Georgina Bardach	4:47.46
2011	(United States) Julia Smit	4:46.15	(Brazil) Joanna Maranhão	4:46.33	(United States) Allysa Vavra	4:48.05
2015	(United States) Caitlin Leverenz	4:35.46	(Canada) Sydney Pickrem	4:38.03	(Brazil) Joanna Maranhão	4:38.07
2019	(Canada) Tessa Cieplucha	4:39.90	(Argentina) Virginia Bardach	4:41.05	(Canada) Mary-Sophie Harvey	4:43.20
2023	(Canada) Julie Brousseau	4:43.76	(United States) Lucerne Bell	4:44.27	(Brazil) Gabrielle Roncatto	4:44.92

=== 4×100 m freestyle ===
Games	Gold		Silver		Bronze	
1951	United States; Carolyn Green; Sharon Geary; Jackie LaVine; Betty Brey	4:37.1	Argentina; Ana María Schultz; Eileen Holt; Cristina Kujath; Emma Gondona	4:48.1	Brazil; Talita Rodrigues; Idamis Busin; Ana Lucia Santa Rita; Piedade Coutinho	5:03.6
1955	United States; Wanda Werner; Carolyn Green; Gretchen Kluter; Judith Roberts	4:31.8	Canada; Helen Stewart; Gladys Priestley; Virginia Grant; Beth Whittall	4:38.1	Argentina; Liliana Gonzalias; Ana María Schultz; Eileen Holt; Cristina Kujath	4:43.7
1959	United States; Molly Botkin; Joan Spillane; Shirley Stobs; Chris von Saltza	4:17.5	Canada; Margaret Iwasaki; Helen Hunt; Sara Barber; Sandra Scott	4:31.9	Mexico; Blanca Barrón; María Luisa Souza; Gloria Botella; Rebeca García	4:37.0
1963	United States; Elizabeth MacCleary; Sharon Stouder; Judy Norton; Donna de Varona	4:15.7	Canada; Lynne Pomfret; Sharon Pierce; Eileen Weir; Mary Stewart	4:31.7	Brazil; Eliana Souza Motta; Maria Lourdes Teixeira; Angela Maria Palioli; Vera Maria Formiga	4:34.3
1967	United States; Wendy Fordyce; Pam Carpinelli; Linda Gustavson; Pam Kruse	4:04.57	Canada; Marion Lay; Angela Coughlan; Elaine Tanner; Sandra Smith	4:09.73	Puerto Rico; Ana Marcial; Kristina Moir; Melanie Laporte; Anita Lallande	4:26.56
1971	United States; Sandy Neilson; Wendy Fordyce; Katheryn McKitrick; Lynn Skrifvars	4:04.20	Canada; Leslie Cliff; Donna Gurr; Dianne Gate; Angela Coughlan	4:10.52	Brazil; Rosemary Ribeiro; Cristiane Paquelet; Maria Hungerbuler; Lucy Burle	4:15.24
1975	United States; Kathy Heddy; Bonnee Brown; Jill Sterkel; Kim Peyton	3:53.31	Canada; Gail Amundrud; Anne Jardin; Wendy Quirk; Janice Stenhouse	3:54.95	Brazil; Christiane Paquelet; Lucy Burle; Maria Guimarães; Rosemary Ribeiro	4:12.20
1979	United States; Stephanie Elkins; Tracy Caulkins; Jill Sterkel; Cynthia Woodhead	3:45.82	Canada; Gail Amundrud; Carol Klimpel; Anne Jardin; Wendy Quirk	3:50.18	Mexico; Teresa Rivera; Isabel Reuss; Yvonne Guerrero; Helen Plaschinski	4:02.05
1983	United States; Jill Sterkel; Dara Torres; Mary Wayte; Carrie Steinseifer	3:46.46	Canada; Carol Klimpel; Kathy Bald; Pamela Rai; Jane Kerr	3:49.49	Mexico; Patricia Kohlmann; Rosa Fuentes; Irma Huerta; Teresa Rivera	4:00.43
1987	United States; Kathy Coffin; Jenny Thompson; Sara Linke; Carrie Steinseifer	3:48.68	Canada; Cheryl McArton; Robin Ruggiero; Manon Simard; Denise Gereghty	3:52.25	Costa Rica; Natasha Aguilar; Marcela Cuesta; Carolina Mauri; Silvia Poll	3:55.43
1991	United States; Megan Oesting; Suzy Buckovich; Lisa Jacob; Ashley Tappin	3:48.88	Canada; Sharon Turner; Kristin Topham; Joanne Malar; Kimberly Paton	3:52.29	Brazil; Isabelle Vieira; Paula Marsiglia; Paula Renata Aguiar; Paoletti Filippini	3:52.92
1995	United States; Angel Martino; Amy Van Dyken; Lindsey Farella; Cristina Teuscher	3:44.71	Canada; Shannon Shakespeare; Katie Brambley; Joanne Malar; Marianne Limpert	3:49.26	Brazil; Gabrielle Rose; Raquel Takaya; Paula Marsiglia; Paula Carvalho Aguiar	3:52.85
1999	Canada; Jessica Deglau; Marianne Limpert; Sarah Evanetz; Laura Nicholls	3:45.07	United States; Tammie Spatz; Courtney Shealy; Stefanie Williams; Jen Eberwien	3:45.72	Brazil; Juliana Machado; Rebeca Gusmão; Flávia Delaroli; Tatiana Lemos	3:50.37
2003	United States; Amanda Weir; Christina Swindle; Colleen Lanne; Courtney Shealy	3:41.93	Canada; Audrey Lacroix; Elizabeth Collins; Joanne Malar; Kelly Doody	3:46.65	Brazil; Flávia Delaroli; Rebeca Gusmão; Monique Ferreira; Tatiana Lemos	3:47.05
2007	United States; Julia Smit; Samantha Woodward; Emily Kukors; Maritza Correira; Lauren Thies*; Michele King*	3:41.97	Canada; Elizabeth Collins; Seanna Mitchell; Chanelle Charron-Watson; Hilary Bell	3:46.23	Venezuela; Arlene Semeco; Erin Volcán; Ximena Mari Vilar Arriojas; Yanel Pinto; Jeserik Pinto*; Jennifer Marquez*	3:52.87
2011	United States; Madison Kennedy; Elizabeth Pelton; Amanda Kendall; Erika Erndl	3:40.66	Brazil; Michelle Lenhardt; Flávia Delaroli; Tatiana Barbosa; Daynara de Paula; Graciele Herrmann*	3:44.62	Canada; Jennifer Beckberger; Caroline Lapierre; Ashley McGregor; Paige Schultz; Gabrielle Soucisse*	3:48.37
2015	Canada; Sandrine Mainville; Michelle Williams; Katerine Savard; Chantal Van Landeghem; Alyson Ackman*; Dominique Bouchard*	3:36.80	United States; Allison Schmitt; Amanda Weir; Madison Kennedy; Natalie Coughlin; Katie Meili*; Kelsi Worrell*	3:37.01	Brazil; Larissa Oliveira; Graciele Herrmann; Etienne Medeiros; Daynara de Paula; Daiane Oliveira*; Manuella Lyrio*	3:37.39
2019	United States; Lia Neal; Claire Rasmus; Kendyl Stewart; Margo Geer	3:39.59	Brazil; Etiene Medeiros; Larissa Oliveira; Manuella Lyrio; Daynara de Paula	3:40.39	Canada; Alyson Ackman; Kyla Leibel; Katerine Savard; Alexia Zevnik	3:41.01
2023	Canada; Mary-Sophie Harvey; Brooklyn Douthwright; Maggie Mac Neil; Katerine Savard; Julie Brousseau*; Emma O'Croinin*	3:37.75	United States; Gabriela Albiero; Catie DeLoof; Kayla Wilson; Amy Fulmer; Camille Spink*; Olivia Bray*; Reilly Tiltmann*	3:38.42	Brazil; Ana Carolina Vieira; Stephanie Balduccini; Giovanna Diamante; Celine Bispo; Lorrane Ferreira*	3:39.94

=== 4×200 m freestyle ===
Games	Gold		Silver		Bronze	
1987	United States; Susan Habermas; Sara Linke; Pam Hayden; Whitney Hedgepeth	8:13.34	Costa Rica; Natasha Aguilar; Marcela Cuesta; Carolina Mauri; Silvia Poll	8:24.25	Canada; Denise Gereghty; Cheryl McArton; Sally Gilbert; Anne-Marie Anderson	8:25.69
1991	United States; Natalie Norberg; Barbara Metz; Jill Skillman; Lisa Jacob	8:11.47	Canada; Kimberly Paton; Joanne Malar; Nikki Dryden; Tara-Lynn Seymour	8:21.62	Mexico; Lorenza Muñoz; María Rivera; Heike Koerner; Laura Sánchez	8:29.17
1995	United States; Trina Jackson; Dady Vincent; Catherine Fox; Cristina Teuscher	8:07.30	Canada; Katie Brambley; Marianne Limpert; Shannon Shakespeare; Joanne Malar	8:08.25	Argentina; Alicia Barrancos; María Pereyra; Natalia Scapinello; María Garrone	8:27.87
1999	Canada; Jessica Deglau; Joanne Malar; Marianne Limpert; Laura Nicholls	8:05.56	United States; Caroline Geehr; Julia Stowers; Megan Melgaard; Talor Bendel	8:07.18	Brazil; Monique Ferreira; Nayara Ribeiro; Tatiana Lemos; Ana Muniz	8:25.07
2003	United States; Elizabeth Hill; Colleen Lanne; Carly Piper; Dana Vollmer	8:05.47	Brazil; Ana Muniz; Paula Ribeiro; Mariana Brochado; Monique Ferreira	8:10.54	Canada; Joanne Malar; Maya Beaudry; Elizabeth Collins; Kelly Doody	8:10.85
2007	United States; Jessica Rodriquez; Emily Kukors; Ava Ohlgren; Katie Carroll; Lauren Thies*; Teresa Crippen*	8:02.03	Canada; Chanelle Charron-Watson; Elizabeth Collins; Hilary Bell; Stephanie Horner; Savannah King*; Zsofia Balazs*	8:04.56	Brazil; Tatiana Barbosa; Monique Ferreira; Manuella Lyrio; Paula Baracho; Joanna Maranhã*	8:13.15
2011	United States; Catherine Breed; Elizabeth Pelton; Chelsea Nauta; Amanda Kendall; Kim Vandenberg*; Erika Erndl*	8:01.18	Brazil; Joanna Maranhão; Jéssica Cavalheiro; Manuella Lyrio; Tatiana Barbosa; Sarah Correa*; Gabriela Rocha*; Larissa Cieslak*; Thamy Ventorin*	8:09.89	Mexico; Liliana Ibáñez; Patricia Castañeda; Fernanda González; Susana Escobar; Martha Beltrán*; Rita Medrano*	8:12.19
2015	United States; Kiera Janzen; Allison Schmitt; Courtney Harnish; Gillian Ryan; Amanda Weir*; Kylie Stewart*	7:54.32	Brazil; Manuella Lyrio; Jéssica Cavalheiro; Joanna Maranhão; Larissa Oliveira; Bruna Primati*; Gabrielle Roncatto*	7:56.36	Canada; Emily Overholt; Katerine Savard; Alyson Ackman; Brittany MacLean; Erika Seltenreich-Hodgson*; Tabitha Bauman*	7:59.36
2019	United States; Claire Rasmus; Alexandra Walsh; Sarah Gibson; Meaghan Raab	7:57.33	Canada; Alyson Ackman; Katerine Savard; Danica Ludlow; Mary-Sophie Harvey	7:59.16	Brazil; Aline Rodrigues; Larissa Oliveira; Manuella Lyrio; Gabrielle Roncatto	8:07.77
2023	United States; Camille Spink; Kayla Wilson; Kelly Pash; Paige Madden; Amy Fulmer*; Rachel Stege*; Olivia Bray*	7:55.26	Brazil; Maria Fernanda Costa; Nathalia Almeida; Stephanie Balduccini; Gabrielle Roncatto; Maria Paula Heitmann*; Giovanna Diamante*; Celine Bispo*; Maria Luíza Pessanha*	7:55.85	Canada; Mary-Sophie Harvey; Julie Brousseau; Brooklyn Doutwright; Katerine Savard; Emma O'Croinin*; Sydney Pickrem*	7:56.98

=== 4×100 m medley ===
Games	Gold		Silver		Bronze	
1951	United States*; Sharon Geary; Penny Pence; Maureen O'Brien	3:49.3	Argentina*; Ana María Schultz; Nélida Del Roscio; Aurora Otero Rey	3:59.7	Mexico*; Magda Bruggemann; Charlotte Knapp; Adriana Hernández	4:13.2
1955	United States; Coralie O'Connor; Mary Jane Sears; Betty Brey; Wanda Werner	5:11.6	Canada; Helen Stewart; Lenora Fisher; Virginia Grant; Beth Whittall	5:12.2	Argentina; Liliana Gonzalias; Vanna Rocco; Eileen Holt; Beatríz Rohde	5:30.5
1959	United States; Carin Cone; Anne Brancroft; Becky Collins; Chris von Saltza	4:44.6	Canada; Margaret Iwasaki; Janice Shepp; Sara Barber; Sandra Scott	4:58.7	Mexico; Blanca Barrón; Eulalia Martínez; Gloria Botella; Rebeca García	5:18.7
1963	United States; Ginny Duenkel; Cynthia Goyette; Sharon Stouder; Donna de Varona	4:49.1	Canada; Mary Stewart; Madelaine Sevigny; Sharon Pierce; Lynne Pomfret	4:52.5	Venezuela; Bettina Giller; Luisa Ruiz; Laura Varela; Anneliese Rockenbach	5:11.8
1967	United States; Kendis Moore; Catie Ball; Ellie Daniel; Wendy Fordyce	4:30.0	Canada; Elaine Tanner; Donna Ross; Marilyn Corson; Marion Lay	4:40.88	Uruguay; Themis Trama; Ana María Norbis; Lylian Castillo; Ruth Apt	4:49.27
1971	Canada; Donna Gurr; Jane Wright; Leslie Cliff; Angela Coughlan	4:35.50	United States; Susie Atwood; Lynn Colella; Deena Deardurff; Sandy Neilson	4:36.73	Mexico; Maria Teresa Ramírez; Leonor Urueta; Norma Amezcua; Marcia Arriaga	4:45.18
1975	United States; Rosemary Bonne; Marcia Morey; Camille Wright; Kim Peyton	4:22.34	Canada; Lynn Chenard; Joanne Baker; Wendy Quirk; Jill Quirk	4:24.84	Brazil; Christiane Paquelet; Cristina Teixeira; Flávia Nadalutti; Lucy Burle	4:37.67
1979	United States; Linda Jezek; Tracy Caulkins; Jill Sterkel; Cynthia Woodhead	4:13.24	Canada; Cheryl Gibson; Anne Gagnon; Nancy Garapick; Gail Amundrud	4:20.16	Mexico; Teresa Rivera; Elke Holtz; Helen Plaschinski; Inez Guerrero	4:30.59
1983	United States; Susan Walsh; Kim Rhodenbaugh; Laurie Lehner; Carrie Steinseifer	4:12.99	Canada; Barbara McBain; Anne Ottenbrite; Michelle MacPherson; Jane Kerr	4:13.84	Mexico; Teresa Rivera; Silvia Rivero; Aida Huerta; Patricia Kohlmann	4:30.72
1987	United States; Holly Green; Lori Heisick; Janel Jorgensen; Sara Linke	4:12.92	Canada; Manon Simard; Keltie Duggan; Robin Ruggiero; Cheryl McArton	4:17.78	Costa Rica; Silvia Poll; Montserrat Hidalgo; Marcela Cuesta; Carolina Mauri	4:23.11
1991	United States; Jodi Wilson; Dorsey Tierney; Angie Wester-Krieg; Ashley Tappin	4:12.51	Brazil; Ana Azevedo; Glicia Lofego; Paoletti Filippini; Celina Endo	4:23.45	Mexico; Heike Koerner; Monique Piñon; Gabriela Gaja; Laura Sánchez	4:25.94
1995	United States; BJ Bedford; Kelli King Bednar; Amy Van Dyken; Angel Martino	4:08.17	Canada; Joanne Malar; Lisa Flood; Shannon Shakespeare; Marianne Limpert	4:19.06	Brazil; Patrícia Comini; Fabíola Molina; Gabrielle Rose; Paula Carvalho Aguiar	4:22.08
1999	United States; Denali Knapp; Staciana Stitts; Karen Campbell; Tammie Spatz	4:06.08	Canada; Kelly Stefanyshyn; Lauren van Oosten; Jessica Deglau; Laura Nicholls	4:08.73	Brazil; Fabíola Molina; Tanya Schuh; Patrícia Comini; Tatiana Lemos	4:15.00
2003	United States; Diana MacManus; Staciana Stitts; Dana Vollmer; Amanda Weir	4:05.92	Canada; Joanne Malar; Kathleen Stoody; Audrey Lacroix; Elizabeth Collins	4:13.72	Mexico; Danielle de Alba; Adriana Marmolejo; Atenas Lopez; Alejandra Galan	4:18.04
2007	United States; Julia Smit; Michelle McKeehan; Kathleen Hersey; Maritza Correia; Brielle White*	4:04.60	Canada; Elizabeth Wycliffe; Annamay Pierse; Stephanie Horner; Chanelle Charron-Watson; Caitlin Meredith*; Jillian Tyler*; Elizabeth Collins*	4:07.85	Bahamas; Alana Dillette; Alicia Lightbourne; Arianna Vanderpool-Wallace; Nikia Deveaux	4:18.97
2011	United States; Rachel Bootsma; Annie Chandler; Claire Donahue; Amanda Kendall; Elizabeth Pelton*; Ashley Wanland*; Elaine Breeden*; Erika Erndl*	4:01.00	Canada; Ashley McGregor; Gabrielle Soucisse; Erin Miller; Jennifer Beckberger; Brenna MacLean*; Kierra Smith*; Samantha Corea*; Caroline Lapierre*	4:07.04	Brazil; Fabíola Molina; Tatiane Sakemi; Daynara de Paula; Tatiana Barbosa	4:07.12
2015	United States; Natalie Coughlin; Katie Meili; Kelsi Worrell; Allison Schmitt	3:56.53	Canada; Dominique Bouchard; Rachel Nicol; Noemie Thomas; Chantal Van Landeghem; Tera van Beilen*; Sandrine Mainville*	3:58.51	Brazil; Etiene Medeiros; Jhennifer Conceição; Daynara de Paula; Larissa Oliveira; Natalia de Luccas*; Beatriz Travalon*	4:02.52
2019	United States; Phoebe Bacon; Anne Lazor; Kendyl Stewart; Margo Geer; Isabelle Stadden*; Molly Hannis*; Sarah Gibson*; Lia Neal	3:57.64	Canada; Danielle Hanus; Faith Knelson; Haley Black; Alexia Zevnik; Mackenzie Glover*; Mary-Sophie Harvey*; Katerine Savard*; Alyson Ackman*	4:01.90	Brazil; Etiene Medeiros; Jhennifer Conceição; Giovanna Diamante; Larissa Oliveira; Fernanda de Goeij*; Pâmela de Souza*; Daynara de Paula*; Manuella Lyrio*	4:04.96
2023	Canada; Danielle Hanus; Rachel Nicol; Maggie Mac Neil; Mary-Sophie Harvey; Madelyn Gatrall*; Sophie Angus*; Katerine Savard*; Brooklyn Doutwright*	3:58.76	United States; Josephine Fuller; Emma Weber; Kelly Pash; Catie DeLoof; Reilly Tiltmann*; Anna Keating*; Olivia Bray*; Gabriela Albiero*	3:59.39	Mexico; Miranda Grana; Melissa Rodríguez; María José Mata; Sofia Revilak; Andrea Sansores*; María Fernanda Jiménez*; Miriam Guevara*; Athena Meneses*	4:04.73

* The 1951 event was not a 4×100 m but a 3×100 m medley relay

=== 10 km marathon ===
Games	Gold		Silver		Bronze	
2007	(United States) Chloe Sutton	2:13:47.6	(Brazil) Poliana Okimoto	2:13:48.4	(Canada) Tanya Hunks	2:13:50.5
2011	(Argentina) Cecilia Biagioli	2:04:11.5	(Brazil) Poliana Okimoto	2:05:51.3	(United States) Christine Jennings	2:05:52.2
2015	(United States) Eva Fabian	2:03:17.0	(Venezuela) Paola Pérez	2:03:17.0	(Ecuador) Samantha Arévalo	2:03:17.1
2019	(Brazil) Ana Marcela Cunha	2:00:51.9	(Argentina) Cecilia Biagioli	2:01:23.2	(Brazil) Viviane Jungblut	2:01:24.0
2023	(United States) Ashley Twichell	1:56:16.4	(Brazil) Ana Marcela Cunha	1:57:29.4	(Brazil) Viviane Jungblut	1:57:51.1

== Mixed events ==
=== 4×100 m freestyle ===
Games	Gold		Silver		Bronze	
2019	United States; Michael Chadwick; Nathan Adrian; Claire Rasmus; Margo Geer; Andrew Abruzzo*; Charles Swanson*; Madison Kennedy*; Ali DeLoof*	3:24.84	Brazil; Breno Correia; Marcelo Chierighini; Larissa Oliveira; Etiene Medeiros; João de Lucca*; Pedro Spajari*; Lorrane Ferreira*; Camila Mello*	3:25.97	Mexico; Daniel Ramírez; Jorge Iga; Monika González-Hermosillo; María Mata; Tayde Revilak*; Marie Condé*; José Martínez*	3:31.36
2023	Brazil; Guilherme Caribé; Marcelo Chierighini; Ana Carolina Vieira; Stephanie Balduccini; Felipe Ribeiro de Souza*; Victor Alcará*; Lorrane Ferreira*; Nathalia Almeida*	3:23.78	United States; Brooks Curry; Jonny Kulow; Catie DeLoof; Amy Fulmer; Jack Dahlgren*; Gabi Albiero*; Paige Madden*	3:24.21	Canada; Finlay Knox; Javier Acevedo; Maggie Mac Neil; Mary-Sophie Harvey; Stephen Calkins*; Édouard Fullum-Huot*; Brooklyn Doutwright*; Katerine Savard*	3:25.23

=== 4×100 m medley ===
Games	Gold		Silver		Bronze	
2019	Brazil; Guilherme Guido; João Gomes Júnior; Giovanna Diamante; Larissa Oliveira; Jhennifer Conceição*; Manuella Lyrio*; Leonardo de Deus*; Vinicius Lanza*	3:48.61	Canada; Javier Acevedo; James Dergousoff; Danielle Hanus; Alexia Zevnik; Haley Black*; Kyla Leibel*	3:49.97	Argentina; Andrea Berrino; Julia Sebastian; Santiago Grassi; Federico Grabich; Virginia Bardach*; Florencia Perotti*; Lautaro Rodriguez*; Roberto Strelkov*	3:50.53
2023	United States; Kennedy Noble; Jacob Foster; Kelly Pash; Jonny Kulow; Jack Aikins*; Arsenio Bustos*; Olivia Bray*; Kayla Wilson*; Vinicius Lanza*	3:44.71	Canada; Javier Acevedo; Gabe Mastromatteo; Maggie Mac Neil; Mary-Sophie Harvey; Blake Tierney*; James Dergousoff*; Katerine Savard*; Brooklyn Doutwright*	3:46.20	Brazil; Guilherme Basseto; João Gomes Júnior; Clarissa Rodrigues; Stephanie Balduccini; Gabriel Fantoni*; Jhennifer Conceição*; Victor Baganha*; Giovanna Diamante*	3:49.24

== See also ==
- Swimming at the Pan American Games
