= Swimming at the 1955 Pan American Games – Women's 200 metre freestyle =

Women's 200 metre freestyle at the 1955 Pan American Games
- Venue: -
- Dates: March 20 (preliminaries and finals)

Medalists
| Gold medal | Wanda Werner | United States |
| Silver medal | Liliana Gonzalias | Argentina |
| Bronze medal | Gilda Aranda | Mexico |

The women's 200 metre freestyle competition of the swimming events at the 1955 Pan American Games took place on 20 March. The last Pan American Games champion was Ana María Schultz of Argentina.

This race consisted of four lengths of the pool, all in freestyle.

== Results ==
All times are in minutes and seconds.

| KEY: | q | Fastest non-qualifiers | Q | Qualified | GR | Games record | NR | National record | PB | Personal best | SB | Seasonal best |

=== Final ===
The final was held on March 20.

| Rank | Name | Nationality | Time | Notes |
|---|---|---|---|---|
| 1st place, gold medalist(s) | Wanda Werner | United States | 2:32.5 | |
| 2nd place, silver medalist(s) | Liliana Gonzalias | Argentina | 2:32.9 | |
| 3rd place, bronze medalist(s) | Gilda Aranda | Mexico | 2:33.6 | |
| 4 | Susan Gray | United States | 2:33.7 | |
| 5 | Beth Whittall | Canada | 2:37.7 | |
| 6 | Gladys Priestley | Canada | 2:37.8 | |
| 7 | - | - | - | |
| 8 | - | - | - | |
