= Swimming at the 1955 Pan American Games – Men's 4 × 100 metre medley relay =

Men's 4 × 100 metre medley relay at the 1955 Pan American Games
- Venue: -
- Dates: March 21 (preliminaries and finals)

Medalists
| Gold medal | Frank McKinney; Fred Maguire; Leonide Baarcke; Clark Scholes | United States |
| Silver medal | Pedro Galvão; Héctor Domínguez; Orlando Cossani; Federico Zwanck | Argentina |
| Bronze medal | Clemente Mejía; Walter Ocampo; Eulalio Ríos; Otilio Holguin | Mexico |

The men's 4 × 100 metre medley relay competition of the swimming events at the 1955 Pan American Games took place on 21 March. It was the first appearance of this event in the Pan American Games.

== Results ==
All times are in minutes and seconds.

| KEY: | Q | Qualified for finals | GR | Games record | NR | National record | PB | Personal best | SB | Seasonal best |

=== Final ===
The final was held on March 21.

| Rank | Name | Nationality | Time | Notes |
|---|---|---|---|---|
| 1st place, gold medalist(s) | Frank McKinney; Fred Maguire; Leonide Baarcke; Clark Scholes | United States | 4:29.1 | |
| 2nd place, silver medalist(s) | Pedro Galvão; Héctor Domínguez; Orlando Cossani; Federico Zwanck | Argentina | 4:33.4 | |
| 3rd place, bronze medalist(s) | Clemente Mejía; Walter Ocampo; Eulalio Ríos; Otilio Holguin | Mexico | 4:35.5 | |
| 4 | João Gonçalves Filho; Nélson Ferreira; Fernando Pavão; Manuel dos Santos | Brazil | 4:38.2 | |
| 5 | Jorge Flores; Julio Martinez; Jorge Attila; Fernando Zameral | El Salvador | 5:18.2 | |
| 6 | - - - - | - | - | |
| 7 | - - - - | - | - | |
| 8 | - - - - | - | - | |
