= Swimming at the 1955 Pan American Games =

The Swimming competition at the 2nd Pan American Games was held in Mexico City, Mexico during the Games' run in 1955. It consisted of 16 long course (50m) events: 8 for males and 8 for females.

== Results ==
=== Men ===
Event	Gold		Silver		Bronze	
100 Freestyle	Clarke Scholes (United States) USA	57.7	George Park; Canada	58.7	Carl Woolley (United States) USA	59.3
400 Freestyle	Jimmy McLane (United States) USA	4:51.3	Wayne Moore (United States) USA	4:53.4	Oscar Kramer; Argentina	4:56.1
1500 Freestyle	Jimmy McLane (United States) USA	20:04.0	Oscar Kramer; Argentina	20:09.9	Gilberto Martínez; Colombia	20:37.2
100 Backstroke	Frank McKinney (United States) USA	1:07.1	Pedro Galvao; Argentina	1:07.8	Leonide "Buddy" Baarcke (United States) USA	1:07.9
200 Breaststroke	Héctor Domínguez; Argentina	2:46.9	Manuel Sanguily; Cuba	2:47.3	Walter Ocampo; Mexico	2:50.7
200 Butterfly	Eulalio Ríos; Mexico	2:39.8	Walter Ocampo; Mexico	2:40.3	William Yorzyk (United States) USA	2:42.5
4 × 200; Free Relay	United States; Martin Smith; William Yorzyk; Wayne Moore; Jimmy McLane	9:00.0	Argentina; Pedro Galvão; Federico Zwanck; José Izaguirre; Jorge Vogt	9:09.0	Canada; George Park; Allen Gilchrist; Gerry McNamee; Ted Simpson	9:12.2
4 × 100; Medley Relay	United States; Frank McKinney; Fred Maguire; Leonide Baarcke; Clark Scholes	4:29.1	Argentina; Pedro Galvão; Héctor Domínguez; Orlando Cossani; Federico Zwanck	4:33.4	Mexico; Clemente Mejía; Walter Ocampo; Eulalio Ríos; Otilio Holguin	4:35.5

=== Women ===
Event	Gold		Silver		Bronze	
100 Freestyle	Helen Stewart; Canada	1:07.7	Wanda Werner (United States) USA	1:07.7	Virginia Grant; Canada	1:08.3
200 Freestyle	Wanda Werner (United States) USA	2:32.5	Liliana Gonzalias; Argentina	2:32.9	Gilda Aranda; Mexico	2:33.6
400 Freestyle	Beth Whittall; Canada	5:32.4	Carolyn Green (United States) USA	5:34.7	Carol Tait (United States) USA	5:34.9
100 Backstroke	Leonore Fisher; Canada	1:16.7	Coralie O'Connor (United States) USA	1:17.8	Cynthia Gill (United States) USA	1:17.9
200 Breaststroke	Mary Lou Elsenius (United States) USA	3:08.4	Mary Jane Sears (United States) USA	3:09.0	Beatriz Rohde; Argentina	3:09.4
100 Butterfly	Beth Whittall; Canada	1:16.2	Betty Brey (United States) USA	1:16.5	Shelley Mann (United States) USA	1:17.7
4 × 100; Free Relay	United States; Wanda Werner; Carolyn Green; Gretchen Kluter; Judith Roberts	4:31.8	Canada; Helen Stewart; Gladys Priestley; Virginia Grant; Beth Whittall	4:38.1	Argentina; Liliana Gonzalias; Ana María Schultz; Eileen Holt; Cristina Kujath	4:43.7
4 × 100; Medley Relay	United States; Coralie O'Connor; Mary Jane Sears; Betty Brey; Wanda Werner	5:11.6	Canada; Helen Stewart; Lenora Fisher; Virginia Grant; Beth Whittall	5:12.2	Argentina; Liliana Gonzalias; Vanna Rocco; Eileen Holt; Beatríz Rohde	5:30.5

== Medal table ==
Rank	Nation	Gold	Silver	Bronze	Total
1	United States	10	6	6	22
2	Canada	4	3	2	9
3	Argentina	1	5	4	10
4	Mexico	1	1	3	5
5	Cuba	0	1	0	1
6	Colombia	0	0	1	1
Totals (6 entries)		16	16	16	48
