= Swimming at the 1955 Pan American Games – Women's 100 metre freestyle =

Women's 100 metre freestyle at the 1955 Pan American Games
- Venue: -
- Dates: March 23 (preliminaries and finals)

Medalists
Gold medal	Helen Stewart	Canada
Silver medal	Wanda Werner	United States
Bronze medal	Virginia Grant	Canada

The women's 100 metre freestyle competition of the swimming events at the 1955 Pan American Games took place on 23 March. The last Pan American Games champion was Sharon Geary of US.

This race consisted of two lengths of the pool, both lengths being in freestyle.

== Results ==
All times are in minutes and seconds.

KEY:	q	Fastest non-qualifiers	Q	Qualified	GR	Games record	NR	National record	PB	Personal best	SB	Seasonal best

=== Final ===
The final was held on March 23.

Rank	Name	Nationality	Time	Notes
1st place, gold medalist(s)	Helen Stewart	Canada	1:07.7	
2nd place, silver medalist(s)	Wanda Werner	United States	1:07.7	
3rd place, bronze medalist(s)	Virginia Grant	Canada	1:08.3	
4	Liliana Gonzalias	Argentina	1:08.4	
5	Gretchen Kluter	United States	1:08.9	
6	Shelley Mann	United States	1:09.3	
7	Eileen Holt	Argentina	1:09.3	
8	Cristina Kujath	Argentina	1:10.7	
