= Swimming at the 1955 Pan American Games – Women's 100 metre backstroke =

Women's 100 metre backstroke at the 1955 Pan American Games
- Venue: -
- Dates: March 24 (preliminaries and finals)

Medalists
| Gold medal | Leonore Fischer | Canada |
| Silver medal | Coralie O'Connor | United States |
| Bronze medal | Cynthia Gill | United States |

The women's 100 metre backstroke competition of the swimming events at the 1955 Pan American Games took place on 24 March. The last Pan American Games champion was Maureen O'Brien of US.

This race consisted of two lengths of the pool, all in backstroke.

== Results ==
All times are in minutes and seconds.

| KEY: | q | Fastest non-qualifiers | Q | Qualified | GR | Games record | NR | National record | PB | Personal best | SB | Seasonal best |

=== Final ===
The final was held on March 24.

| Rank | Name | Nationality | Time | Notes |
|---|---|---|---|---|
| 1st place, gold medalist(s) | Leonore Fischer | Canada | 1:16.7 | GR |
| 2nd place, silver medalist(s) | Coralie O'Connor | United States | 1:17.8 | |
| 3rd place, bronze medalist(s) | Cynthia Gill | United States | 1:17.9 | |
| 4 | Shelley Mann | United States | 1:18.2 | |
| 5 | Sara Barber | Canada | 1:18.8 | |
| 6 | Isa Teixeira | Brazil | 1:20.4 | |
| 7 | Vanna Rocco | Argentina | 1:20.6 | |
| 8 | Liliana Gonzalias | Argentina | - | |
