= Swimming at the 1955 Pan American Games – Women's 400 metre freestyle =

Women's 400 metre freestyle at the 1955 Pan American Games
- Venue: -
- Dates: March 25 (preliminaries and finals)

Medalists
Gold medal	Beth Whittall	Canada
Silver medal	Carolyn Green	United States
Bronze medal	Carol Tait	United States

The women's 400 metre freestyle competition of the swimming events at the 1955 Pan American Games took place on 25 March. The last Pan American Games champion was Ana María Schultz of Argentina.

This race consisted of eight lengths of the pool, with all eight being in the freestyle stroke.

== Results ==
All times are in minutes and seconds.

KEY:	q	Fastest non-qualifiers	Q	Qualified	GR	Games record	NR	National record	PB	Personal best	SB	Seasonal best

=== Final ===
The final was held on March 25.

Rank	Name	Nationality	Time	Notes
1st place, gold medalist(s)	Beth Whittall	Canada	5:32.4	
2nd place, silver medalist(s)	Carolyn Green	United States	5:34.7	
3rd place, bronze medalist(s)	Carol Tait	United States	5:34.9	
4	Susan Gray	United States	5:36.5	
5	Gilda Aranda	Mexico	5:44.2	
6	Blanca Barrón	Mexico	5:47.8	
7	-	-	-	
8	-	-	-	
