= Judith Roberts =

Judith Roberts may refer to:

- Judith Roberts (Australian actress) (born 1944), Australian actress, wife of actor Reg Gorman
- Judith Roberts (1958–1972), English murder victim in the Andrew Evans case
- Judith Roberts (producer) (born 1970), American film producer and writer whose credits include Simply Irresistible
- Judith Roberts (actress), (born 1934), American actress
- Judith Roberts (swimmer) (1934–2016), American former competition swimmer

== See also ==
- Roberts (surname)
