= Manon Simard =

Canadian sports executive

- Occupation: Director-general
- Organization: CEPSUM

Manon Simard is a Canadian sports executive currently serving as Director-general of the CEPSUM at the Université de Montréal. Named Director-general in 2020, she is the first woman to hold the position in the university's history. A former athlete on the Canadian national swim team, she had almost qualified for the 1988 Summer Olympics, ranked 19th in the world for the 100 metre backstroke. She joined the Université de Montréal in 1995 as Sports Excellence Coordinator for the relaunched Montreal Carabins.
