= Gerry McNamee =

Canadian swimmer

Personal information
- Born: 4 March 1934
- Died: 17 November 1984 (aged 50)

Sport
- Sport: Swimming
Medal record
Representing Canada
British Empire and Commonwealth Games
| Silver medal – second place | 1954 Vancouver | 4×220yd freestyle relay |
Pan American Games
| Bronze medal – third place | 1955 Mexico City | 4×200m freestyle relay |

Gerald S. "Gerry" McNamee (4 March 1934 – 17 November 1984) was a Canadian swimmer. He competed in three events at the 1952 Summer Olympics.

McNamee finished 2nd in the 1954 British Empire and Commonwealth Games 4 x 220 yards Freestyle Relay, 3rd in the 1955 Pan American Games 4 x 200 meter Freestyle Relay, fifth in the 1954 British Empire and Commonwealth Games 440 yards freestyle and sixth in the 1650 yards freestyle in the same event.
