= Swimming at the 1951 Pan American Games – Women's 100 metre backstroke =

Women's 100 metre freestyle at the 1951 Pan American Games
- Venue: -
- Dates: March 2 (preliminaries and finals)

Medalists
Gold medal	Maureen O'Brien	United States
Silver medal	Sheila Donahue	United States
Bronze medal	Magda Bruggeman	Mexico

The women's 100 metre backstroke competition of the swimming events at the 1951 Pan American Games took place on 2 March.

This race consisted of two lengths of the pool, all in backstroke.

== Results ==
All times are in minutes and seconds.

KEY:	q	Fastest non-qualifiers	Q	Qualified	GR	Games record	NR	National record	PB	Personal best	SB	Seasonal best

=== Final ===
The final was held on March 2.

Rank	Name	Nationality	Time	Notes
1st place, gold medalist(s)	Maureen O'Brien	United States	1:18.5	
2nd place, silver medalist(s)	Sheila Donahue	United States	1:20.5	
3rd place, bronze medalist(s)	Magda Bruggeman	Mexico	1:21.4	
4	-	-	-	
5	-	-	-	
6	Ana de Santa Rita	Brazil	1:22.4	
7	Idamys Busin	Brazil	1:22.8	
8	-	-	-	
