= Lenora Fisher =

Canadian swimmer (born 1937)

Personal information
- Born: 6 January 1937 (age 89)

Sport
- Sport: Swimming
- Strokes: Backstroke
Medal record
Women's swimming
Representing Canada
Pan American Games
Gold medal – first place	1955 Mexico City	100 m backstroke
Silver medal – second place	1955 Mexico City	4×100 m medley

Lenora Fisher (born 6 January 1937) is a Canadian former backstroke and freestyle swimmer. She competed at the 1952 Summer Olympics and the 1956 Summer Olympics.
