= Eulalio Ríos Alemán =

Mexican swimmer

Eulalio Ríos
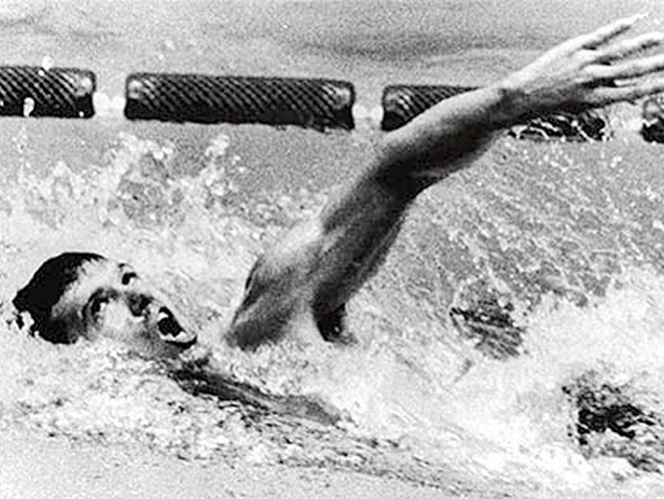
- Eulalio Ríos with Marco Antonio Muñoz, governor of Veracruz. c. 1955

Personal information
- Full name: Eulalio Ríos Alemán
- Nationality: Mexico
- Born: 21 January 1935 Hueyapan de Ocampo, Mexico
- Died: 28 August 1986 (aged 51)
- Height: 1.62 m (5 ft 4 in)
- Weight: 75 kg (165 lb)

Sport
- Sport: Swimming
- Strokes: Butterfly
Medal record
Men's swimming
Representing Mexico
Pan American Games
Gold medal – first place	1955 Mexico City	200 m butterfly
Bronze medal – third place	1955 Mexico City	4x100 m medley
Bronze medal – third place	1959 Chicago	200 m butterfly
Bronze medal – third place	1959 Chicago	4x100 m medley

Eulalio Ríos Alemán (21 January 1935 – 27 August 1986) was a Mexican Olympic swimmer.

== Family ==
He was born to a low-income family in a small town in the state of Veracruz, and from a young age he trained to swim against the current of a brook that passed near his home, in Hueyapan de Ocampo, to the south of Catemaco on the road to Coatzacoalcos.

== Early years ==
He was already a fast freestyle swimmer with a thudding kick when he went to Xalapa to study law and to be coached in swimming.

In 1956 he learned the butterfly stroke under the guidance of his trainer Antonio Murrieta and watched an exhibition of the (by that time) "new dolphin kick" technique by the experienced swimmer Walter Ocampo, of Mexico City's Centro Deportivo Chapultepec.

He practiced and learned quickly in the cold waters of the rustic pool "La PLaya", near Los Berros park in Xalapa.

Within a few months he swam successfully in the olympic trials and was ready to compete for Mexico in the 1956 Melbourne Olympic Games.

== Competitions, records, prizes ==
- Panamerican Games
- Centroamerican Games
- USA Open National Championships
- 1956 Melbourne Olympic Games: He competed in the 200 meters butterfly, passed the qualifications heats and participated in the final, becoming the first Mexican swimmer to have done so in Olympic Games.

See: 200 m butterfly final in 1956

- 1960 Rome Olympic Games Eulalio reached the semifinals.

See: 200 m butterfly semifinal #1 in 1960.

- "Trofeo Latinoamericano Cabeza De Palenque" awarded by the International Swimming Hall Of Fame" (at Fort Lauderdale, FL) "for the 1956 Olympics where he placed 6th in the 200m fly".
