= Gladys Priestley =

Canadian swimmer (born 1938)

Personal information
- Born: 17 June 1938 (age 88) Montreal, Quebec, Canada

Sport
- Sport: Swimming
Medal record
Representing Canada
British Empire and Commonwealth Games
Silver medal – second place	1954 Vancouver	440yd freestyle
Silver medal – second place	1954 Vancouver	4×110yd freestyle relay
Silver medal – second place	158 Cardiff	4×110yd freestyle relay
Bronze medal – third place	1958 Cardiff	4×110yd medley relay
Pan American Games
Silver medal – second place	1955 Mexico City	4×100m freestyler relay

Gladys Priestley (born 17 June 1938) is a Canadian former freestyle swimmer. She competed at the 1952 Summer Olympics and the 1956 Summer Olympics.
