= Clemente Mejía =

Mexican swimmer (1928–1978)

Personal information
- Full name: Clemente Mejía Avila
- Nationality: Mexico
- Born: 23 November 1928 Acapulco, Mexico
- Died: 28 March 1978 (aged 49) Acapulco, Mexico
- Height: 1.83 m (6 ft 0 in)
- Weight: 75 kg (165 lb)

Sport
- Sport: Swimming
- Strokes: Backstroke
Medal record
Men's swimming
Representing Mexico
Pan American Games
Bronze medal – third place	1951 Buenos Aires	3 x 100 m medley
Bronze medal – third place	1955 Mexico City	4 x 100 m medley

Clemente Mejía (23 November 1928 – 28 March 1978) was a Mexican swimmer who competed in the 1948 Summer Olympics and in the 1952 Summer Olympics.
