= Eileen Holt =

Argentine swimmer (1931–2007)

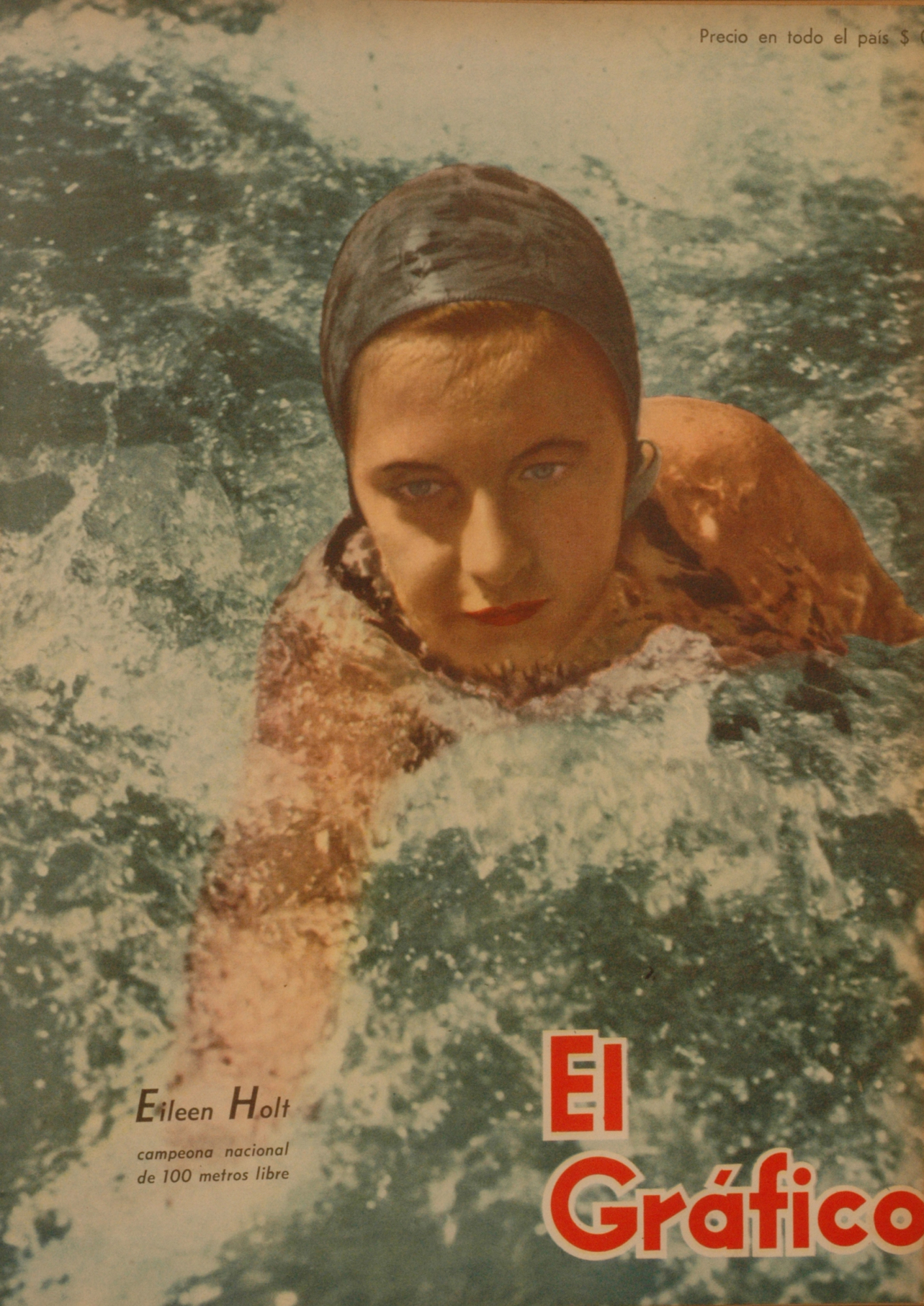

Personal information
- Nationality: Argentine
- Born: 5 April 1931
- Died: 15 September 2007 (aged 76)

Sport
- Sport: Swimming
- Strokes: Freestyle
Medal record
Women's swimming
Representing Argentina
Pan American Games
Silver medal – second place	1951 Buenos Aires	4x100m Freestyle
Bronze medal – third place	1951 Buenos Aires	200m Freestyle
Bronze medal – third place	1955 Mexico City	4x100m Medley
Bronze medal – third place	1955 Mexico City	4×100 m freestyle

Eileen Holt (5 April 1931 – 15 September 2007) was an Argentine freestyle swimmer who competed at the 1948 Summer Olympics.
