= Orlando Cossani =

Argentine swimmer

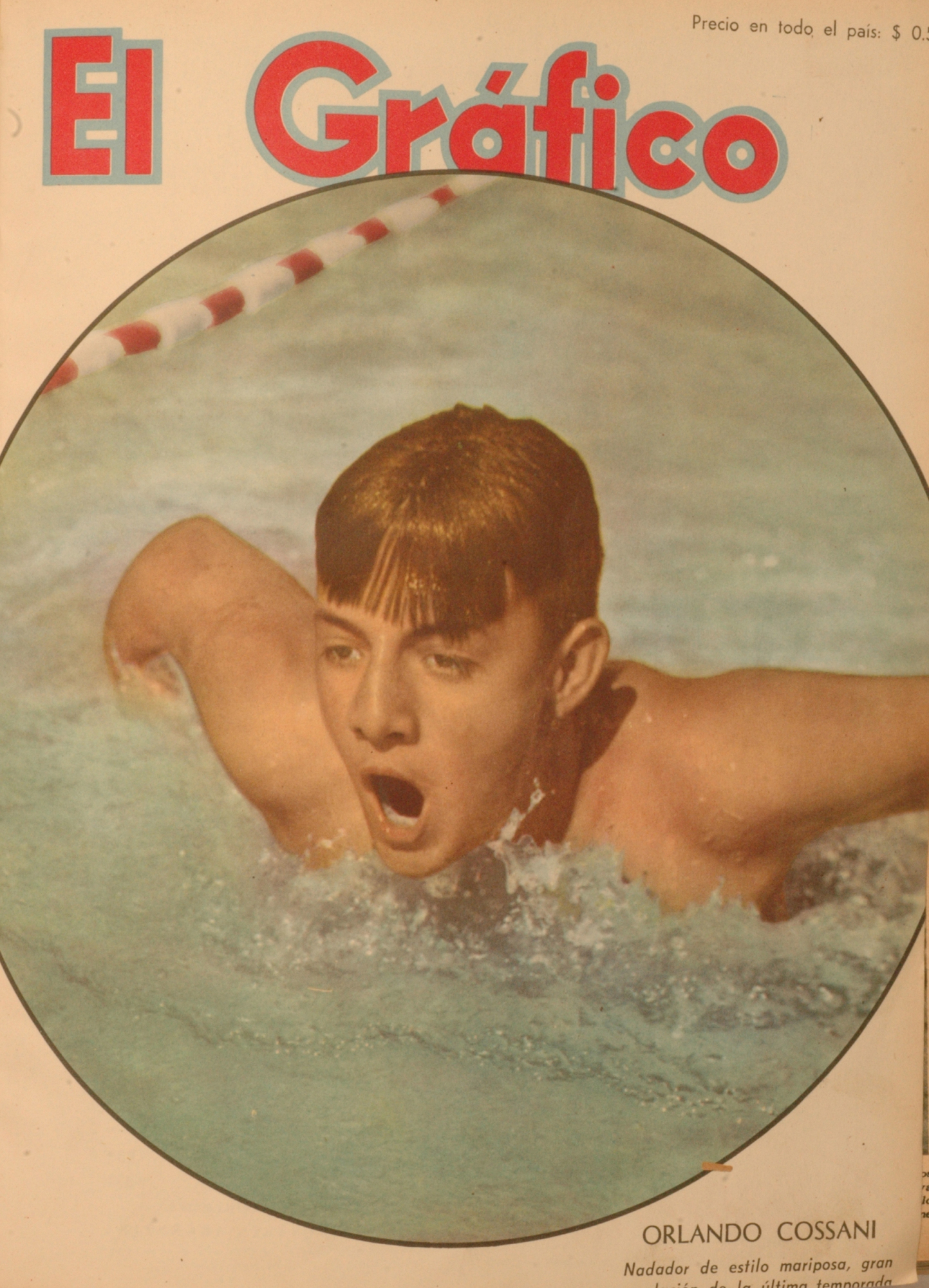

Personal information
- Born: 2 August 1932
- Died: 18 March 2004 (aged 71)

Sport
- Sport: Swimming
Medal record
Representing Argentina
Pan American Games
Silver medal – second place	1951 Buenos Aires	3x100m medley relay
Silver medal – second place	1955 Mexico City	4x100m medley relay

Orlando Cossani (2 August 1932 – 18 March 2004) was an Argentine swimmer. He competed in the men's 200 metre breaststroke at the 1952 Summer Olympics.
