= Coralie O'Connor =

American swimmer (1934–2019)

Personal information
- Full name: Coralie May O'Connor
- National team: United States
- Born: May 1, 1934 Worcester, Massachusetts, U.S.
- Died: December 31, 2019 (aged 85) Worcester, Massachusetts, U.S.
- Occupations: Teacher and swim coach

Sport
- Sport: Swimming
- Strokes: Backstroke
- Club: Lafayette Swim Club
- College team: Purdue University; But trained with Lafayette SC
- Coach: Richard O. Papenguth (Lafayette SC)
Medal record
Women's swimming
Representing the United States
Pan American Games
Gold medal – first place	1955 Mexico City	4×100 m medley
Silver medal – second place	1955 Mexico City	100 m backstroke

Coralie May O'Connor (May 1, 1934 – December 31, 2019) was an American competition swimmer who represented the United States at the 1952 Summer Olympics in Helsinki.

Coralie O'Connor was born May 1, 1934 in Worcester, Massachusetts where she would remain all her life. She began swimming at the Lincoln Square Boy's Club, where a coach watched her swim and suggested stroke improvements, but there was no girl's team, and she often had to sneak in her workout when the director was gone. She often swam during the boy's practice as the only girl present. She graduated Classical High School.

== Collegiate years ==
O'Connor attended Purdue University and improved her skill markably while competing for the Lafayette Swim Club. Though Purdue had no women's swim team, most of the Purdue women's swimmers trained and competed with the Lafayette Swim Club under Coach Dick Pappenguth, who was also the official coach for the Purdue Swim team. Pappenguth was known for giving his women's teams long practices with challenging intervals that made them nationally competitive. He led the team to a National Championships in both 1951 and 1952.

As a Purdue Junior, she became a National AAU backstroke champion in 1955 and was an All-American.

== 1952 Helsinki Olympics ==
O'Connor competed in the preliminary heats of the women's 100-meter backstroke at the 1952 Helsinki Olympics in late July where she placed twelfth and posted a time of 1:19.7. Dutch swimmer Geertje Wielema was the clear favorite for the 100m Backstroke but had been suffering with anemia and was very limited in her ability to train before the games. Nonetheless, she set an unexpected Olympic record in the semi-final, and had an epic battle with South Africa's 16-year old Joan Harrison in the finals. Harrison finished stronger in the finals and barely won the gold, in 1:14.3, with Wielema won the silver finishing on her heels with a time of 1:14.5, and New Zealand's Jean Stewart taking the bronze with a 1:15.8.

Three years later at the 1955 Pan American Games in Mexico City, O'Connor won a gold medal as a member of the first-place U.S. team in the women's 4×100-meter medley relay. Her gold medal teammates included Mary Sears, Betty Mullen and Wanda Werner. Individually, she also received a silver medal for finishing second in the women's 100-meter backstroke.

== Coaching, teaching ==
She taught physical education in the Worcester Public School system including South High School, and in the 1970's coached the Worcester Academy Boy's team for a five year stretch. In the 1960s, O'Connor was for many years the coach of the Worcester Swim Club which she founded, a private competitive club that produced numerous prep and college swimmers.

=== Honors ===
Widely recognized for her achievements both locally and on the world stage, she was inducted into the Worcester Boys & Girls Club Hall of Fame and is a member of the International Swimming Hall of Fame.

O'Connor died December 31, 2019 in Worcester, Massachusetts at the age of 85.
