= George Park (swimmer) =

Canadian swimmer (1933–2019)

Personal information
- Full name: George Park
- Born: 19 May 1933 Hamilton, Ontario, Canada
- Died: 26 May 2019 (aged 86) Ladner, British Columbia, Canada

Sport
- Sport: Swimming
Medal record
Men's swimming
Representing Canada
British Empire and Commonwealth Games
Silver medal – second place	1954 Vancouver	4×220 yd freestyle
Silver medal – second place	1958 Cardiff	4×110 yd medley
Pan American Games
Silver medal – second place	1955 Mexico City	100 m freestyle
Bronze medal – third place	1955 Mexico City	4×200 m freestyle

George Park (19 May 1933 – 26 May 2019) was a Canadian butterfly and freestyle swimmer. He competed in two events at the 1956 Summer Olympics.
