= Virginia Grant =

Canadian swimmer (1937–2017)

Personal information
- Nationality: Canadian
- Born: 9 August 1937
- Died: 24 October 2017 (aged 80)

Sport
- Sport: Swimming
Medal record
Representing Canada
British Empire and Commonwealth Games
Silver medal – second place	1954 Vancouver	110yd freestyle
Silver medal – second place	1954 Vancouver	4×110yd freestyle relay
Pan American Games
Silver medal – second place	1955 Mexico City	4×100m freestyle relay
Silver medal – second place	1955 Mexico City	4×100m medley relay
Bronze medal – third place	1955 Mexico City	100m freestyle

Virginia Grant (9 August 1937 – 24 October 2017) was a Canadian swimmer. She competed in two events at the 1956 Summer Olympics. She won the 1956 British 'Open' ASA National Championship 100 metres freestyle title and the 1955 and 1956 ASA National Championship 220 yards freestyle titles.
