= Judith Roberts (swimmer) =

American swimmer (1934–2016)

- Roberts during her swimming career

Personal information
- Full name: Judith Theresa Roberts -Thomas
- Nickname: "Judy"
- National team: United States
- Born: May 15, 1934 Dallas, Texas, U.S.
- Died: November 22, 2016 (aged 82) Indianapolis, Indiana
- Spouse: Morris T. Thomas (1956)
- Children: Son, Daughter

Sport
- Sport: Swimming
- Event: 100 freestyle
- Strokes: Freestyle
- Club: Indianapolis Athletic Club (IAC)
- Coach: James C. W. Clark (IAC); Richard O. Papenguth (Olympics)
Medal record
Women's swimming
Representing the United States
Pan American Games
| Gold medal – first place | 1955 Mexico City | 4×100 m freestyle |

Judith Theresa Roberts (May 15, 1934 – November 22, 2016), also known by her married name Judy Roberts Thomas after 1956, was an American competition freestyle swimmer who competed for the Indianapolis Athletic Club and represented the United States at the 1952 Summer Olympics in Helsinki, Finland, where she placed fourteenth overall in the 100-meter freestyle. She set an American record in the 110-yard freestyle in August, 1953 with a time of 1:07.9 at the National AAU Outdoor Competition in Portland, Oregon.

== Early life ==
Roberts was born one of four siblings on May 15, 1934 in Dallas, Texas to mother Bernadine and father James Roberts. Roberts swam for the strong regional program at the Indianapolis Athletic Club (IAC) under Coach James C. W. Clark. James Cass Williamson Clark, who had formerly coached swimming for Indiana's Butler University, coached men's and women's swimming at the Indianapolis Athletic Club from at least 1946-1952, and had coached there for several years prior to WWII. During WWII, he coached swimming for the Navy at the Great Lakes Naval Base, and at bases in Norfolk, Viginia, and in Bainbridge, Maryland. Including Roberts, James Clark would mentor three Olympians with the Indianapolis Athletic Club during his career, including Mary Ann Marchino, mentioned below, and backstroker Frank McKinney who competed in the 1956 Melbourne Olympics and won a gold medal in the 1960 Rome Olympics.

On September 1-2, 1951, Clark's Indianapolis Athletic Club's boys and girls swimming teams handily won the American Red Cross Indianapolis City Championship at the Rivera Club Pool with a combined score of 437, easily defeating the Riviera Club with 119 points, and the Indianapolis YMCA with 77 points. Clark's IAC team set several new city swim records. At the 1951 American Red Cross City-wide Championship Meet, at the age of 14, Roberts was part of a 200-meter freestyle relay team that broke an age-group record city-wide record with of Sue Stoer, Judy Roberts, Betsy Alexander, and Ann Morrison. Mary Anne Marchino, a 1956 Olympian in the 100-meter backstroke, was one of Roberts's fellow swimmers at the meet, and would swim for the Indianapolis Athletic Club with Roberts.

== 1952 Olympic trials ==
Roberts placed second in the finals of the 100-meter freestyle at the U.S. Olympic trials at the Broad Ripple Pool in Indianapolis, Indiana on July 4-6, 1952. Roberts led throughout most of the finals race until she was passed in the last ten meters by Jody Alderson of the Chicago Town Club. In a very close finish, requiring a judge's decision, Judy Roberts placed second with a 1:07.2 to Jody Alderson's very close finish at 1:07.

== 1952 Helsinki Olympics ==
Roberts competed in the women's 100-meter freestyle, at the 1952 Helsinki Olympics where she was coached by U.S. Hall of Fame Head Coach Dick Papenguth. Roberts advanced to the semifinals, and finished fourteenth overall with a time of 1:08.2.

== Indiana University ==
Judy attended Indiana University, graduating in 1956, where she was active in the Kappa Kappa Gama Sorority. Although the University had no varsity women's team during her attendance, she was elected to the honorary Oceanides, an honorary club in the Fall of 1952. During her time at Indiana, she continued to compete representing the Indianapolis Athletic Club.

In national competition in 1953, she placed first in the 110-yard freestyle event in both National AAU indoor championship in Daytona, Florida and the outdoor competition in Portland, Oregon. In the Outdoor competition, representing the Indianapolis Athletic Club in August, 1953, in Portland, Oregon, Roberts set a new American record in 110-yard freestyle with a time of 1:07.9, breaking the former 23-year old record of Helene Madison by .3 seconds. In the indoor competition for the 100-yard freestyle, she won the event in Daytona, Florida in 1953 with a time of 59.2. Roberts tied for second in the 100-yard freestyle event at the AAU National Indoor Swimming and Diving Championship in April 1954 in Daytona Beach, Florida.

== 1955 Pan Am Games ==
At the 1955 Pan American Games in Mexico City, Roberts won a gold medal as a member of the winning U.S. team in the women's 4×100-meter freestyle relay. Her American relay teammates at the Pan American Games included Carolyn Green, Wanda Werner and Gretchen Kluter. Judy's selection for the Pan American team was partly based on her time in the 220-yard freestyle of 2:36.5 at a Pan Am selection process in February, 1955 in Indianapolis, Indiana, where she continued to represent the Indianapolis Athletic Club.

== Marriage ==
Roberts met her husband Morris T. Thomas Junior while they were students at Indiana, and they married after she graduated in 1956. They remained married throughout her life and raised two children.

She died at the age of 82 on November 22, 2016, in Indianapolis, Indiana, and was survived by her husband Morris, a son, a daughter and grandchildren. A memorial service was held on December 12 at St. Luke's United Methodist Church where she was a member in later life. She was active in the Meridian Street United Methodist Church, and worked with Camp Otto, their summer camp for sixth and fifth grade children. Active in a variety of women's causes, she was a member of the Guild for the Children's Museum in Indianapolis. She served on the Board for the Indiana United Methodist's Children's Home. In leisure activities, she played golf and was a member of the Meridian Hills Country Club.
