= Otilio Olguín =

Mexican swimmer (1931–1994)

Personal information
- Born: February 13, 1931
- Died: November 28, 1994 (aged 63)

Sport
- Sport: Swimming, water polo
Medal record
Representing Mexico
Pan American Games
Bronze medal – third place	1955 Mexico City	4x100m medley relay
Central American and Caribbean Games
Gold medal – first place	1954 Mexico City	100m freestyle
Gold medal – first place	1954 Mexico City	4x200m freestyle relay

Otilio Alberto Olguín Rodrigo (13 February 1931 – 28 November 1994) was a Mexican swimmer and water polo player who competed in the 1952 Summer Olympics.
