= Federico Zwanck =

Argentine swimmer (born 1934)

Personal information
- Born: 1 March 1934 (age 92) Córdoba, Argentina

Sport
- Sport: Swimming
Medal record
Representing Argentina
Pan American Games
Silver medal – second place	1955 Mexico City	4×200 m freestyle
Silver medal – second place	1955 Mexico City	4×100 m medley

Federico Zwanck (born 1 March 1934) is an Argentine former freestyle swimmer. In the National Championships of Argentina in 1952, he was victorious in the 200m, 400m and 800m. He competed in three events at the 1952 Summer Olympics. In 1955, he competed in the Pan American Games, in which he won two silver medals, one in 4 × 100 m medley and another in 4 × 200 m freestyle.

In September 1956, he and his teammates achieved the South American record for 4x200 freestyle. It was then planned that he competed in the 1956 Summer Olympics, but the political situation did not allow it. He and his teammates had received presents from ex-president Juan Perón but the new government did not permit their participation.

== Personal life ==
He is married and to Liliana Zwank, a golfer in the Ladies European Tour.
