= Walter Ocampo =

Mexican swimmer

Personal information
- Full name: Walter Ocampo Esparza
- Nationality: Mexico
- Born: 27 December 1928 Mexico City, Mexico
- Died: 2 September 2007 (aged 78) San Diego, California, U.S.

Sport
- Sport: Swimming
- Strokes: Breaststroke, butterfly
Medal record
Men's swimming
Representing Mexico
Pan American Games
Silver medal – second place	1955 Mexico City	200 m butterfly
Bronze medal – third place	1955 Mexico City	200 m breaststroke
Bronze medal – third place	1955 Mexico City	4×100 m medley
Central American and Caribbean Games
Gold medal – first place	1954 Mexico City	200 m butterfly

Walter Ocampo (27 December 1928 – 2 September 2007) was a Mexican breaststroke and butterfly swimmer who competed in the 1952 Summer Olympics and in the 1956 Summer Olympics.
