= Gilda Aranda =

Mexican swimmer (born 1933)

Personal information
- Born: 19 November 1933 (age 92)

Sport
- Sport: Swimming
Medal record
Representing Mexico
Pan American Games
Bronze medal – third place	1955 Mexico City	200m freestyle
Central American and Caribbean Games
Gold medal – first place	1954 Mexico City	100m freestyle
Gold medal – first place	1954 Mexico City	400m freestyle
Gold medal – first place	1954 Mexico City	4x100m freestyle relay

Gilda Aranda (born 19 November 1933) is a Mexican former swimmer. She competed in the women's 100 metre freestyle at the 1956 Summer Olympics.
