= Beth Whittall =

Canadian swimmer (1936–2015)

Personal information
- Full name: Elizabeth Whittall
- Nickname: "Beth"
- National team: Canada
- Born: May 26, 1936 Montreal, Quebec, Canada
- Died: May 1, 2015 (aged 78) Hudson, Quebec, Canada

Sport
- Sport: Swimming
- Strokes: Freestyle, butterfly
Medal record
Women's swimming
Representing Canada
Pan American Games
Gold medal – first place	1955 Mexico City	400 m freestyle
Gold medal – first place	1955 Mexico City	100 m butterfly
Silver medal – second place	1955 Mexico City	4x100 m freestyle
Silver medal – second place	1955 Mexico City	4x100 m medley

Elizabeth Whittall (May 26, 1936 – May 1, 2015) was a Canadian competitive swimmer from Montreal, Quebec, Canada.

When she was 17 years old, Whittall won a silver medal in the 1954 British Empire and Commonwealth Games as a member of the Canadian 4×110 yd freestyle relay team. While studying pharmacy at Purdue University, Whittall won two gold medals at the 1955 Pan American Games in Mexico City. She also won the 100-metre butterfly and the 400-metre freestyle events and was a member of the Canadian 4x400-metre medley relay team that won a silver medal. For those achievements, she was awarded the Lou Marsh Trophy as Canada's top athlete for 1955 and was inducted into the Canadian Olympic Hall of Fame. At the end of that year, she held five Canadian swimming records, including the 110-yard butterfly, and the one-mile swim. She finished seventh in the 100-metre butterfly at the 1956 Summer Olympics and retired from competition the following year.

In 1987, at the age of 50, Whittall set a Canadian record in the 200-metre freestyle for competitors in the 50-to-54 age group.

Whittall died on May 1, 2015, at the age of 78, and was posthumously inducted into the Canadian Olympic Hall of Fame on June 17, 2015.
