= Liliana Gonzalias =

Argentine swimmer (born 1932)

Personal information
- Nationality: Argentina
- Born: 14 December 1932 (age 93) Adrogué, Argentina

Sport
- Sport: Swimming
- Strokes: Freestyle, Backstroke
Medal record
Women's swimming
Representing Argentina
Pan American Games
Silver medal – second place	1955 Mexico City	200m Freestyle
Bronze medal – third place	1955 Mexico City	4 × 100 m Medley
Bronze medal – third place	1955 Mexico City	4 × 100 m freestyle

Liliana Gonzalias (born 14 December 1932) is an Argentine swimmer who competed at the 1948 Summer Olympics and won three medals at the 1955 Pan American Games.
