= Swimming at the Pan American Games =

- No. of events: 34 (men: 17; women: 17)

Swimming for both men and women has been a part of the Pan American Games since the Games' first edition in 1951. The United States is the most successful country, winning 376 gold and 799 overall medals.

== Men's events ==
Event	51	55	59	63	67	71	75	79	83	87	91	95	99	03	07	11	15	19	23	Years
Current program
50 metre freestyle										X	X	X	X	X	X	X	X	X	X	10
100 metre freestyle	X	X	X	X	X	X	X	X	X	X	X	X	X	X	X	X	X	X	X	19
200 metre freestyle					X	X	X	X	X	X	X	X	X	X	X	X	X	X	X	15
400 metre freestyle	X	X	X	X	X	X	X	X	X	X	X	X	X	X	X	X	X	X	X	19
1500 metre freestyle	X	X	X	X	X	X	X	X	X	X	X	X	X	X	X	X	X	X	X	19
100 metre backstroke	X	X	X	X	X	X	X	X	X	X	X	X	X	X	X	X	X	X	X	19
200 metre backstroke					X	X	X	X	X	X	X	X	X	X	X	X	X	X	X	15
100 metre breaststroke					X	X	X	X	X	X	X	X	X	X	X	X	X	X	X	15
200 metre breaststroke	X	X	X	X	X	X	X	X	X	X	X	X	X	X	X	X	X	X	X	19
100 metre butterfly					X	X	X	X	X	X	X	X	X	X	X	X	X	X	X	15
200 metre butterfly		X	X	X	X	X	X	X	X	X	X	X	X	X	X	X	X	X	X	18
200 metre individual medley					X	X	X	X	X	X	X	X	X	X	X	X	X	X	X	15
400 metre individual medley					X	X	X	X	X	X	X	X	X	X	X	X	X	X	X	15
4 × 100 metre freestyle relay					X	X	X	X	X	X	X	X	X	X	X	X	X	X	X	15
4 × 200 metre freestyle relay	X	X	X	X	X	X	X	X	X	X	X	X	X	X	X	X	X	X	X	19
4 × 100 metre medley relay		X	X	X	X	X	X	X	X	X	X	X	X	X	X	X	X	X	X	18
Marathon 10 km															X	X	X	X	X	5
Past event
3 × 100 metre medley relay	X																			1
Events	7	8	8	8	15	15	15	15	15	16	16	16	16	16	17	17	17	17	17	271

== Women's events ==
Event	51	55	59	63	67	71	75	79	83	87	91	95	99	03	07	11	15	19	23	Years
Current program
50 metre freestyle										X	X	X	X	X	X	X	X	X	X	10
100 metre freestyle	X	X	X	X	X	X	X	X	X	X	X	X	X	X	X	X	X	X	X	19
200 metre freestyle	X	X	X	X	X	X	X	X	X	X	X	X	X	X	X	X	X	X	X	19
400 metre freestyle	X	X	X	X	X	X	X	X	X	X	X	X	X	X	X	X	X	X	X	19
800 metre freestyle					X	X	X	X	X	X	X	X	X	X	X	X	X	X	X	15
100 metre backstroke	X	X	X	X	X	X	X	X	X	X	X	X	X	X	X	X	X	X	X	19
200 metre backstroke					X	X	X	X	X	X	X	X	X	X	X	X	X	X	X	15
100 metre breaststroke					X	X	X	X	X	X	X	X	X	X	X	X	X	X	X	15
200 metre breaststroke	X	X	X	X	X	X	X	X	X	X	X	X	X	X	X	X	X	X	X	19
100 metre butterfly		X	X	X	X	X	X	X	X	X	X	X	X	X	X	X	X	X	X	18
200 metre butterfly					X	X	X	X	X	X	X	X	X	X	X	X	X	X	X	15
200 metre individual medley					X	X	X	X	X	X	X	X	X	X	X	X	X	X	X	15
400 metre individual medley					X	X	X	X	X	X	X	X	X	X	X	X	X	X	X	15
4 × 100 metre freestyle relay	X	X	X	X	X	X	X	X	X	X	X	X	X	X	X	X	X	X	X	19
4 × 200 metre freestyle relay										X	X	X	X	X	X	X	X	X	X	10
4 × 100 metre medley relay		X	X	X	X	X	X	X	X	X	X	X	X	X	X	X	X	X	X	18
Marathon 10 km															X	X	X	X	X	5
Past event
3 × 100 metre medley relay	X																			1
Events	7	8	8	8	14	14	14	14	14	16	16	16	16	16	17	17	17	17	17	266

== Mixed events ==
Event	51	55	59	63	67	71	75	79	83	87	91	95	99	03	07	11	15	19	23	Years
Current program
4 × 100 metre freestyle relay																		X	X	2
4 × 100 metre medley relay																		X	X	2
Events																		2	2	4

== All-time medal table ==
=== Long course swimming ===
Men's, women's and mixed events (1951–2023)
Rank	Nation	Gold	Silver	Bronze	Total
1	United States	370	269	149	788
2	Brazil	69	69	101	239
3	Canada	64	128	132	324
4	Argentina	12	21	22	55
5	Venezuela	7	5	21	33
6	Costa Rica	4	3	2	9
7	Cuba	2	4	8	14
8	Trinidad and Tobago	2	2	4	8
9	Suriname	2	1	2	5
10	Ecuador	2	0	1	3
11	Mexico	1	7	44	52
12	Chile	1	3	2	6
13	Cayman Islands	1	2	1	4
14	Bahamas	1	0	3	4
15	Puerto Rico	0	8	6	14
16	Jamaica	0	5	0	5
17	Colombia	0	2	6	8
18	Uruguay	0	2	3	5
19	Guatemala	0	1	2	3
20	Panama	0	1	1	2
21	Peru	0	0	2	2
22	Barbados	0	0	1	1
22	Netherlands Antilles	0	0	1	1
22	Paraguay	0	0	1	1
Totals (24 entries)		538	533	515	1,586

=== Marathon swimming ===
Men's and women's events (2007–2023)
Rank	Nation	Gold	Silver	Bronze	Total
1	United States	6	4	1	11
2	Brazil	1	3	4	8
3	Argentina	1	2	1	4
4	Ecuador	1	0	2	3
5	Canada	1	0	1	2
6	Venezuela	0	1	0	1
7	Mexico	0	0	1	1
Totals (7 entries)		10	10	10	30

=== Combined total ===
Last updated after the 2023 Pan American Games
Rank	Nation	Gold	Silver	Bronze	Total
1	United States	376	273	150	799
2	Brazil	70	72	105	247
3	Canada	64	128	152	344
4	Argentina	13	24	24	61
5	Venezuela	7	7	21	35
6	Costa Rica	4	3	2	9
7	Ecuador	3	0	3	6
8	Cuba	2	4	8	14
9	Trinidad and Tobago	2	2	4	8
10	Suriname	2	1	1	4
11	Mexico	1	7	41	49
12	Chile	1	3	2	6
13	Cayman Islands	1	2	1	4
14	Bahamas	1	0	3	4
15	Puerto Rico	0	8	6	14
16	Jamaica	0	5	0	5
17	Colombia	0	2	6	8
18	Uruguay	0	2	3	5
19	Guatemala	0	1	2	3
20	Panama	0	1	1	2
21	Peru	0	0	2	2
22	Barbados	0	0	1	1
22	Netherlands Antilles	0	0	1	1
22	Paraguay	0	0	1	1
Totals (24 entries)		547	545	540	1,632
