= Swimming at the 1995 Pan American Games – Women's 200 metre breaststroke =

Women's 200 metre breaststroke at the 1995 Pan American Games
- Venue: Complejo Natatorio
- Dates: between March 12–17 (preliminaries and finals)
- Competitors: from - nations

Medalists
Gold medal	Lisa Flood	Canada
Silver medal	Guylaine Cloutier	Canada
Bronze medal	Anita Nall	United States

The women's 200 metre breaststroke competition of the swimming events at the 1995 Pan American Games took place between March 12–17 at the Complejo Natatorio. The last Pan American Games champion was Dorsey Tierney of the United States.

This race consisted of four lengths of the pool, all in breaststroke.

== Results ==
All times are in minutes and seconds.

KEY:	q	Fastest non-qualifiers	Q	Qualified	GR	Games record	NR	National record	PB	Personal best	SB	Seasonal best

=== Final ===
The final was held between March 12–17.

Rank	Name	Nationality	Time	Notes
1st place, gold medalist(s)	Lisa Flood	Canada	2:31.33	
2nd place, silver medalist(s)	Guylaine Cloutier	Canada	2:32.42	
3rd place, bronze medalist(s)	Anita Nall	United States	2:32.83	
4	Alison Fealey	United States	2:35.02	
5	Maria Santa Cruz	Argentina	2:36.94	
6	Isabel Rojas	Colombia	2:43.50	
7	Javiera Salcedo	Argentina	2:46.21	
8	Kenia Brinez	Venezuela	2:49.72	
