= Swimming at the 1995 Pan American Games – Women's 100 metre breaststroke =

Women's 100 metre breaststroke at the 1995 Pan American Games
- Venue: Complejo Natatorio
- Dates: between March 12–17 (preliminaries and finals)
- Competitors: from - nations

Medalists
Gold medal	Lisa Flood	Canada
Silver medal	Guylaine Cloutier	Canada
Bronze medal	Kelli King-Bednar	United States

The women's 100 metre breaststroke competition of the swimming events at the 1995 Pan American Games took place between March 12–17 at the Complejo Natatorio. The last Pan American Games champion was Dorsey Tierney of US.

This race consisted of two lengths of the pool, both lengths being in breaststroke.

== Results ==
All times are in minutes and seconds.

KEY:	q	Fastest non-qualifiers	Q	Qualified	GR	Games record	NR	National record	PB	Personal best	SB	Seasonal best

=== Final ===
The final was held between March 12–17.

Rank	Name	Nationality	Time	Notes
1st place, gold medalist(s)	Lisa Flood	Canada	1:10.36	
2nd place, silver medalist(s)	Guylaine Cloutier	Canada	1:10.44	
3rd place, bronze medalist(s)	Kelli King-Bednar	United States	1:11.44	
4	Buffy Nelson	United States	1:12.19	
5	Maria Santa Cruz	Argentina	1:14.92	
6	Mikeila Leiva	Cuba	1:15.51	
7	Kenia Brinez	Venezuela	1:15.83	
8	Isabel Rojas	Colombia	1:16.62	
