= We Are Displaced =

Book by Malala Yousafzai

- U.S. front cover
- Author: Malala Yousafzai
- Language: English
- Publisher: Little, Brown and Company (U.S.); Weidenfeld & Nicolson (U.K.)
- Publication date: 8 January 2019
- Media type: Print
- Pages: 224
- ISBN: 9781474610063

We Are Displaced: My Journey and Stories from Refugee Girls Around the World is a 2019 book by Malala Yousafzai. The book was published by Little, Brown and Company in the US and Weidenfeld & Nicolson in the UK. The book follows Yousafzai's own experience being displaced in Pakistan and later forced to move to England, and tells stories from nine other displaced people around the world. The book received positive critical reception and reached the top 10 in The New York Times' bestseller list under the "Young Adult Hardcover" section.

== Background ==
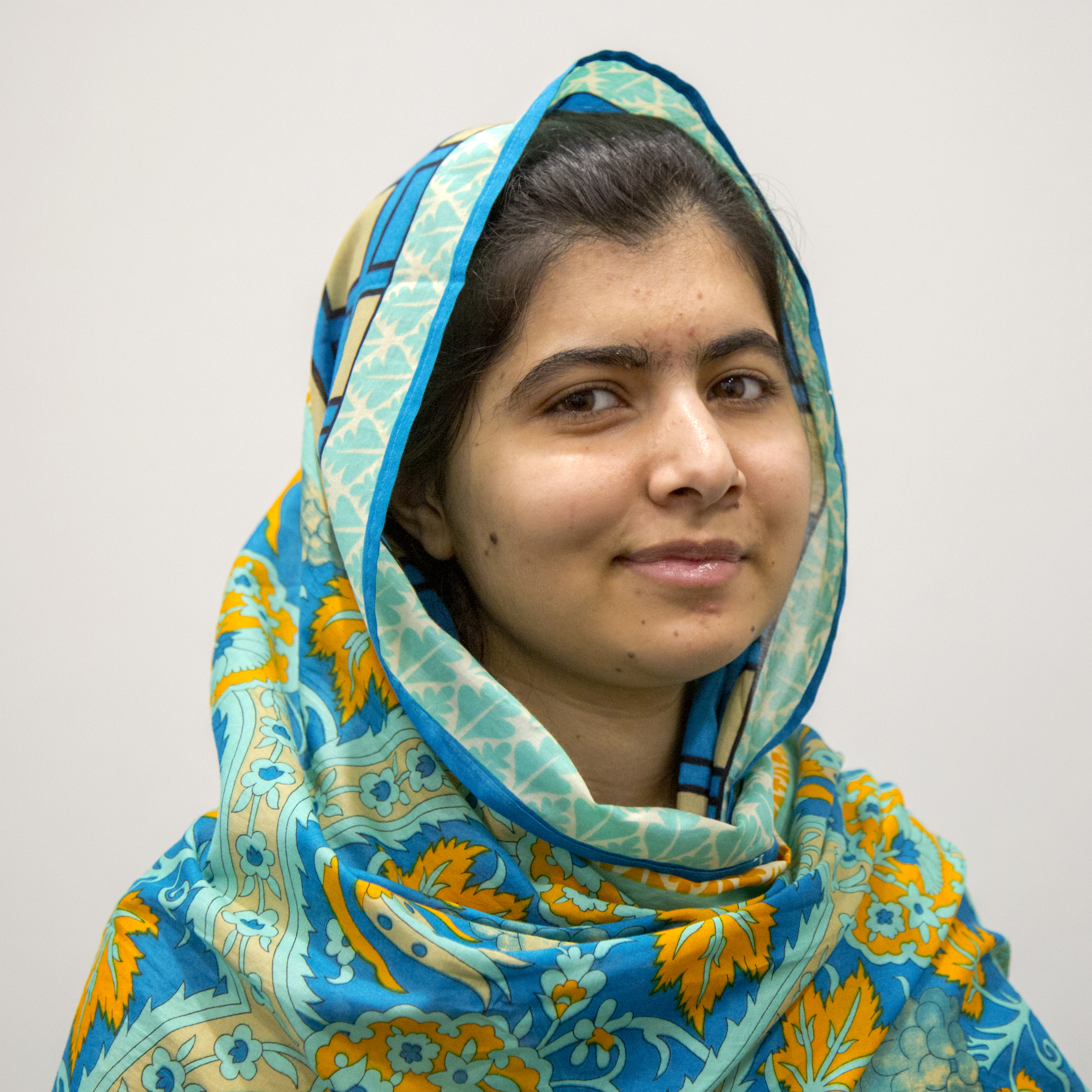
Malala Yousafzai in 2015

Malala Yousafzai is a Pakistani female education activist. Born in Swat Valley in Pakistan on 12 July 1997, she was raised by parents Ziauddin Yousafzai and Tor Pekai Yousafzai alongside two younger brothers Khushal and Atal. At age 11, Malala Yousafzai began writing an anonymous blog for BBC Urdu, detailing her life in Pakistan under the growing influence of the Taliban. Following the blog, she was the subject of a New York Times documentary Class Dismissed, and spoke out for female education in local media. Yousafzai was revealed as the author of the blog in December 2009, and as her public profile rose, she began to receive death threats. On 9 October 2012, a member of the Taliban shot Yousafzai as she was taking a bus from school to her home. She was first sent to a hospital in Peshawar, and later to one in Birmingham. She continued to rise to fame and speak out for the rights of girls; at age 17, she became the youngest Nobel Prize laureate by winning the 2014 Nobel Peace Prize.

Yousafzai had two previously published works: I Am Malala, a 2013 memoir co-written with Christina Lamb, for which a youth edition was published in 2014; and Malala's Magic Pencil, a 2017 children's picture book. In March 2018, it was announced that Yousafzai's next book We Are Displaced: True Stories of Refugee Lives would be published on 4 September 2018. The book was later delayed, and released on 8 January 2019 by Little, Brown and Company's Young Readers division in the U.S. and Weidenfeld & Nicolson in the U.K. The book was also published in Australia and New Zealand. Profits from the book will go to Yousafzai's charity Malala Fund.

Figures from the United Nations in 2017 indicated that 68.5 million people worldwide were displaced, with 24 million of these people being refugees. Yousafzai consciously chose "displaced" rather than "refugee" in the book's title to emphasise that "the majority of people are internally displaced rather than refugees". Yousafzai has been carrying out international activism and visiting refugee camps since around 2013, firstly to a Syrian refugee camp in Jordan. Yousafzai met several of the girls whose stories are included in We Are Displaced in these refugee camps. Speaking about the book, Yousafzai said that "what tends to get lost in the current refugee crisis is the humanity behind the statistics". She further commented that "people become refugees when they have no other option. This is never your first choice." Appearing on CBS This Morning to promote the book, Yousafzai stated of refugees: "We never hear what they want to say, what their dreams are, their aspirations are". As well as crises caused by war and terrorism, Yousafzai wished to highlight refugee stories from those affected by gangs, such as in Latin America.

== Synopsis ==
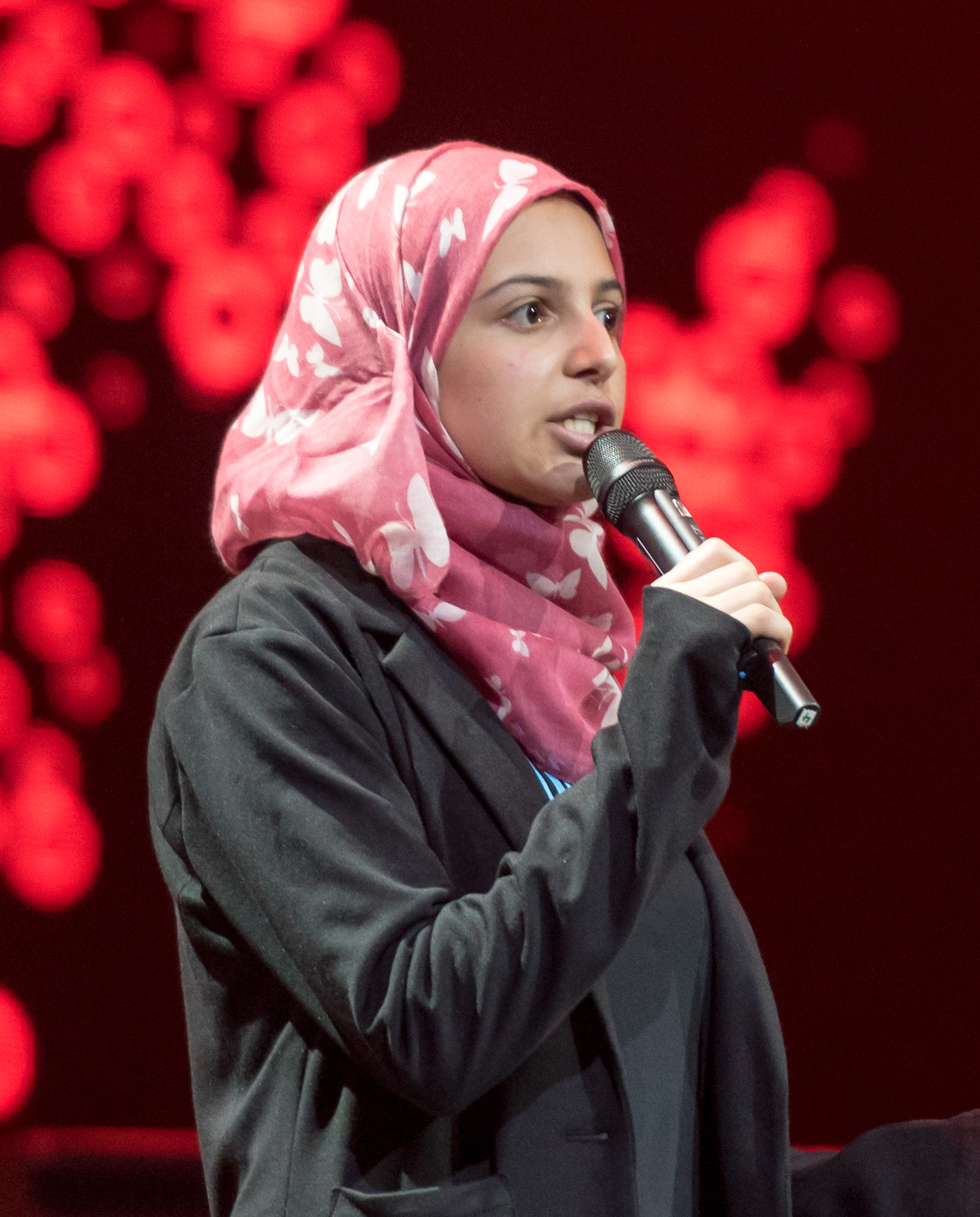
A chapter of We Are Displaced tells Muzoon Almellehan's story.

The book's first part, "I Am Displaced", details Yousafzai's experience being displaced. She details the rise of the Taliban in Mingora, Pakistan which led to forced displacement, with her family moving between relatives in the Shangla District and Peshawar. Three months later, they returned to Mingora to find the city wrecked. Yousafzai continued local activism which culminated in her being shot in the head by a Taliban member. She was taken to Birmingham, England, for treatment and forced to remain there and start a new life.

The second part of the book, "We Are Displaced", describes the experiences of nine displaced people. Each story is given a short introduction by Yousafzai and then narrated by the subject. Siblings Zaynab and Sabreen were born in Yemen. Their father left and their mother got a travel visa to the United States, so they were raised by their grandmother until her death. The Yemeni Crisis led the children to flee to Egypt in 2012, and Zaynab was kicked out of her uncle's house after she was diagnosed with tuberculosis. After recovering in Cairo, Zaynab's visa was granted. Sabreen fled to Italy by boat with a cousin and two friends. Held in inhumane conditions on lengthy bus rides from Cairo to Alexandria, the group were taken across the Mediterranean Sea. After a week, their boat ran out of fuel and they were rescued by the Italian coast guard. Sabreen met a man in a refugee camp in the Netherlands whom she married, and moved with him to Belgium. Meanwhile, Zaynab adjusted to American life.

Syrian girl Muzoon Almellehan was displaced to Jordan after a civil war; in the Zaatari refugee camp, she encouraged girls to attend school, earning her the nickname "the Malala of Syria". Yazidi girl Najla was displaced within Iraq from Sinjar to Dohuk, Iraqi Kurdistan by ISIS. Najla once left home for five days in a successful attempt to convince her parents to let her go to school; in Dohuk, she taught literacy to children. María was displaced within Colombia. Her father was killed in the Colombian conflict, though this was hidden from María for many years; she fled with her mother and sister from Iscuandé to Cali. Analisa fled from Guatemala after her father died. Scared of her half-brother Oscar, Analisa embarked to Mexico and then the U.S. to stay with another half-brother, Ernesto. After a harrowing journey, Analisa reached Texas, where she was transferred between places nicknamed the hielara ("ice box") and perrera ("dog pound"). She made it to a shelter of the Office of Refugee Resettlement and reached her half-brother Ernesto.

Marie Claire's family fled from the Democratic Republic of the Congo to Zambia and applied for refugee status. Aged 12, Marie Claire's mother died in front of her as her parents were brutally attacked. Years later, their refugee status was approved and they were sent to Lancaster, Pennsylvania in the U.S. Though she struggled with the education systems in Zambia and the U.S., Marie Claire graduated high school at 19. Jennifer, working with the Church World Service, helped the family adjust to America, and acted as Marie Claire's "American mum". Ajida fled with her husband and children from the Rohingya genocide in Myanmar to Bangladesh, where they are forced to remain in camps. Ajida makes stoves from clay in the camp. Farah was born in Uganda. She grew up in Canada after Idi Amin revoked Asian Ugandans' citizenship. Farah became CEO of Malala Fund.

An epilogue discusses Yousafzai's 2018 visit to Pakistan, while the "About the Contributors" chapter describes each person's current status.

== Reception ==
In The Irish News, Luke Rix-Standing gave the book a rating of nine out of ten, praising its "searingly honest vulnerability". Rix-Standing particularly praised Malala's story and her writing style, commenting that her "simple, emotive language" and "short, sharp sentences" let the narrative "speak for itself". Fernanda Santos of The New York Times gave the book a positive review, calling it "stirring and timely". Santos praised its "deeply personal stories" and approved that Yousafzai's introduction to each refugee's story give the reader "easy-to-digest lessons in world affairs".

Nayare Ali of the Deccan Chronicle lauded the book as "an eye-opener to the refugee crisis in the post modern world". Ali stated that it contains "several sad, heart wrenching tales that make you deeply gratified for every blessing in life". In a positive review in The Week, Mandira Nayar opined that "this is a story we need to hear. Again. And again." Nayar praised the book's "powerful picture of exile and hope". A Publishers Weekly review commended the writers' "strength, resilience, and hope in the face of trauma" and praised the "profoundly moving" message of the book.

In the "Young Adult Hardcover" section of The New York Times' bestseller list, We Are Displaced reached position #5 on 27 January 2019 and remained on the list in position #7 the following week. On Twitter, business magnate Bill Gates wrote of the book: "I can't think of a better person to bring these stories to light. Congratulations, Malala." Bollywood actor Katrina Kaif praised the book's stories as "moving and inspiring in equal measure".
