= Swimming at the 1995 Pan American Games – Women's 50 metre freestyle =

Women's 50 metre freestyle at the 1995 Pan American Games
- Venue: Complejo Natatorio
- Dates: between March 12–17 (preliminaries and finals)
- Competitors: from - nations

Medalists
| Gold medal | Angel Martino | United States |
| Silver medal | Shannon Shakespeare | Canada |
| Bronze medal | Andrea Moody | Canada |

The women's 50 metre freestyle competition of the swimming events at the 1995 Pan American Games took place between March 12–17 at the Complejo Natatorio. The last Pan American Games champion was Kristin Topham of Canada.

This race consisted of one length of the pool in freestyle.

== Results ==
All times are in minutes and seconds.

| KEY: | q | Fastest non-qualifiers | Q | Qualified | GR | Games record | NR | National record | PB | Personal best | SB | Seasonal best |

=== Final ===
The final was held between March 12–17.

| Rank | Name | Nationality | Time | Notes |
|---|---|---|---|---|
| 1st place, gold medalist(s) | Angel Martino | United States | 25.40 | GR |
| 2nd place, silver medalist(s) | Shannon Shakespeare | Canada | 26.19 | |
| 3rd place, bronze medalist(s) | Andrea Moody | Canada | 26.54 | |
| 4 | Lindsey Farella | United States | 26.63 | |
| 5 | Eileen Coparropa | Panama | 26.75 | |
| 6 | Siobhan Cropper | Trinidad and Tobago | 26.92 | |
| 7 | Deborah Machad | Cuba | 26.94 | |
| 8 | Leah Martindale | Barbados | 26.94 | |
