= Swimming at the 1995 Pan American Games – Women's 200 metre butterfly =

Women's 200 metre butterfly at the 1995 Pan American Games
- Venue: Complejo Natatorio
- Dates: between March 12–17 (preliminaries and finals)
- Competitors: from - nations

Medalists
Gold medal	Trina Jackson	United States
Silver medal	Michelle Griglione	United States
Bronze medal	María Pereyra	Argentina

The women's 200 metre butterfly competition of the swimming events at the 1995 Pan American Games took place between March 12–17 at the Complejo Natatorio. The last Pan American Games champion was Susan Gottlieb of US.

This race consisted of four lengths of the pool, all lengths being in butterfly stroke.

== Results ==
All times are in minutes and seconds.

KEY:	q	Fastest non-qualifiers	Q	Qualified	GR	Games record	NR	National record	PB	Personal best	SB	Seasonal best

=== Final ===
The final was held between March 12–17.

Rank	Name	Nationality	Time	Notes
1st place, gold medalist(s)	Trina Jackson	United States	2:12.37	
2nd place, silver medalist(s)	Michelle Griglione	United States	2:14.94	
3rd place, bronze medalist(s)	María Pereyra	Argentina	2:18.52	
4	Patrícia Comini	Brazil	2:19.28	
5	Edith Arraspide	Argentina	2:21.78	
6	Celia Antepara	Ecuador	2:24.90	
7	Maria Ramirez	El Salvador	2:26.19	
8	-	-	-	
