= Swimming at the 1987 Pan American Games – Men's 100 metre breaststroke =

Men's 100 metre breaststroke at the 1987 Pan American Games
- Venue: Indiana University Natatorium
- Dates: August 9 (preliminaries and finals)
- Competitors: from - nations

Medalists
| Gold medal | Richard Korhammer | United States |
| Silver medal | David Lundberg | United States |
| Bronze medal | Darcy Wallingford | Canada |

The men's 100 metre breaststroke competition of the swimming events at the 1987 Pan American Games took place on 9 August at the Indiana University Natatorium. The last Pan American Games champion was Steve Lundquist of US.

This race consisted of two lengths of the pool, both lengths being in breaststroke.

== Results ==
All times are in minutes and seconds.

| KEY: | q | Fastest non-qualifiers | Q | Qualified | GR | Games record | NR | National record | PB | Personal best | SB | Seasonal best |

=== Final ===
The final was held on August 9.

| Rank | Name | Nationality | Time | Notes |
|---|---|---|---|---|
| 1st place, gold medalist(s) | Richard Korhammer | United States | 1:03.85 | |
| 2nd place, silver medalist(s) | David Lundberg | United States | 1:04.11 | |
| 3rd place, bronze medalist(s) | Darcy Wallingford | Canada | 1:04.55 | |
| 4 | Pedro Hernández | Cuba | 1:05.20 | |
| 5 | Marco Cavazzoni | Canada | 1:05.36 | |
| 6 | Cícero Tortelli | Brazil | 1:05.62 | |
| 7 | Paul Newallo | Trinidad and Tobago | 1:05.97 | |
| 8 | Manuel Gutiérrez | Panama | 1:05.99 | |
