= Swimming at the 1987 Pan American Games – Women's 200 metre breaststroke =

Women's 200 metre breaststroke at the 1987 Pan American Games
- Venue: Indiana University Natatorium
- Dates: August 10 (preliminaries and finals)
- Competitors: from - nations

Medalists
Gold medal	Dorsey Tierney	United States
Silver medal	Alicia Boscatto	Argentina
Bronze medal	Kathy Smith	United States

The women's 200 metre breaststroke competition of the swimming events at the 1987 Pan American Games took place on 10 August at the Indiana University Natatorium. The last Pan American Games champion was Kathy Bald of Canada.

This race consisted of four lengths of the pool, all in breaststroke.

== Results ==
All times are in minutes and seconds.

KEY:	q	Fastest non-qualifiers	Q	Qualified	GR	Games record	NR	National record	PB	Personal best	SB	Seasonal best

=== Final ===
The final was held on August 10.

Rank	Name	Nationality	Time	Notes
1st place, gold medalist(s)	Dorsey Tierney	United States	2:36.87	
2nd place, silver medalist(s)	Alicia Boscatto	Argentina	2:37.09	
3rd place, bronze medalist(s)	Kathy Smith	United States	2:37.57	
4	Keltie Duggan	Canada	2:37.79	
5	Karen Horning	Peru	2:41.32	
6	Georgiana Magalhães	Brazil	2:44.28	
7	Montserrat Hidalgo	Costa Rica	2:46.58	
8	Kathy Ruiz	Puerto Rico	2:50.61	
