= Swimming at the 1979 Pan American Games – Women's 200 metre breaststroke =

Women's 200 metre breaststroke at the 1979 Pan American Games
- Venue: Piscina Olimpica Del Escambron
- Dates: July 5 (preliminaries and finals)
- Competitors: from - nations

Medalists
Gold medal	Anne Gagnon	Canada
Silver medal	Joanne Bédard	Canada
Bronze medal	Patty Spees	United States

The women's 200 metre breaststroke competition of the swimming events at the 1979 Pan American Games took place on 5 July at the Piscina Olimpica Del Escambron. The last Pan American Games champion was Lauri Siering of US.

This race consisted of four lengths of the pool, all in breaststroke.

== Results ==
All times are in minutes and seconds.

KEY:	q	Fastest non-qualifiers	Q	Qualified	GR	Games record	NR	National record	PB	Personal best	SB	Seasonal best

=== Heats ===
The first round was held on July 5.

Rank	Name	Nationality	Time	Notes
1	Anne Gagnon	Canada	2:40.82	Q
2	Joanne Bédard	Canada	2:42.00	Q
3	Alicia Boscatto	Argentina	2:43.57	Q
4	Patty Spees	United States	2:43.91	Q
5	Elke Holtz	Mexico	2:44.01	Q, NR
6	Renee Laravie	United States	2:44.12	Q
7	Yolanda Mendiola	Mexico	2:45.67	Q
8	Maria Matta	Brazil	2:46.83	Q
9	Vilma Aguilera	Puerto Rico	2:49.04	
10	Agnes Nilsson	Brazil	2:50.66	

=== Final ===
The final was held on July 5.

Rank	Name	Nationality	Time	Notes
1st place, gold medalist(s)	Anne Gagnon	Canada	2:35.75	NR, GR
2nd place, silver medalist(s)	Joanne Bédard	Canada	2:40.22	
3rd place, bronze medalist(s)	Patty Spees	United States	2:40.79	
4	Renee Laravie	United States	2:41.84	
5	Alicia Boscatto	Argentina	2:42.32	NR
6	Elke Holtz	Mexico	2:44.50	
7	Yolanda Mendiola	Mexico	2:45.88	
8	Maria Matta	Brazil	2:46.94	
