= Darcy Wallingford =

Canadian swimmer

Sport
- Country: Canada
- Sport: Swimming
- Event: Breaststroke
Medal record
Commonwealth Games
Gold medal – first place	1986 Edinburgh	4 × 100 m medley
Pan American Games
Silver medal – second place	1987 Indianapolis	4 × 100 m medley
Bronze medal – third place	1987 Indianapolis	100 m breaststroke
Bronze medal – third place	1987 Indianapolis	200 m breaststroke

Darcy Wallingford is a Canadian former swimmer of the 1980s.

A breaststroke specialist from Sudbury, Ontario, Wallingford featured at the 1986 World Championships in Madrid, where he placed 21st in the 100 m breaststroke. He swam heats for the gold medal-winning 4 × 100 m medley relay team at the 1986 Commonwealth Games in Edinburgh and won three medals at the 1987 Pan American Games in Indianapolis.

Wallingford's father, Ron, was a noted distance runner, and he has a son, Keon, who also competes in running events.
