= Swimming at the 1987 Pan American Games – Men's 100 metre butterfly =

Men's 100 metre butterfly at the 1987 Pan American Games
- Venue: Indiana University Natatorium
- Dates: August 10 (preliminaries and finals)
- Competitors: from - nations

Medalists
Gold medal	Anthony Nesty	Suriname
Silver medal	Wade King	United States
Bronze medal	Michael Dillon	United States

The Men's 100 metre butterfly competition of the swimming events at the 1987 Pan American Games took place on 10 August at the Indiana University Natatorium. The last Pan American Games champion was Matt Gribble of US.

This race consisted of two lengths of the pool, all in butterfly.

== Results ==
All times are in minutes and seconds.

KEY:	q	Fastest non-qualifiers	Q	Qualified	GR	Games record	NR	National record	PB	Personal best	SB	Seasonal best

=== Final ===
The final was held on August 10.

Rank	Name	Nationality	Time	Notes
1st place, gold medalist(s)	Anthony Nesty	Suriname	53.89	NR, GR
2nd place, silver medalist(s)	Wade King	United States	54.33	
3rd place, bronze medalist(s)	Michael Dillon	United States	54.45	
4	Antonio Portela	Puerto Rico	56.24	
5	Peter Ward	Canada	56.25	
6	Brad Creelman	Canada	56.25	
7	Otávio Silva	Brazil	56.32	
8	Mark Andrews	Trinidad and Tobago	57.50	
