= Swimming at the 1963 Pan American Games – Men's 200 metre breaststroke =

Men's 200 metre breaststroke at the 1963 Pan American Games
- Venue: -

Medalists
Gold medal	Chet Jastremski	United States
Silver medal	Ken Merten	United States
Bronze medal	John Kelso	Canada

The men's 200 metre breaststroke competition of the swimming events at the 1963 Pan American Games took place on April. The last Pan American Games champion was Bill Mulliken of US.

This race consisted of four lengths of the pool, all in breaststroke.

== Results ==
All times are in minutes and seconds.

KEY:	q	Fastest non-qualifiers	Q	Qualified	GR	Games record	NR	National record	PB	Personal best	SB	Seasonal best

=== Final ===
The final was held on April.

Rank	Name	Nationality	Time	Notes
1st place, gold medalist(s)	Chet Jastremski	United States	2:35.4	
2nd place, silver medalist(s)	Ken Merten	United States	2:38.4	
3rd place, bronze medalist(s)	John Kelso	Canada	2:41.4	
4	Alberto Pérez	Argentina	2:42.6	
5	Farid Zablith Filho	Brazil	2:44.6	
6	Dráusio Medeiros	Brazil	2:46.1	
7	-	-	-	
8	-	-	-	
