= Swimming at the 1963 Pan American Games – Women's 200 metre breaststroke =

Women's 200 metre breaststroke at the 1963 Pan American Games
- Venue: –

Medalists
| Gold medal | Alice Driscoll | United States |
| Silver medal | Roby Whipple | United States |
| Bronze medal | Marjon Wilmink | Canada |

The women's 200 metre breaststroke competition of the swimming events at the 1963 Pan American Games took place on April. The last Pan American Games champion was Anne Warner of US.

This race consisted of four lengths of the pool, all in breaststroke.

== Results ==
All times are in minutes and seconds.

| KEY: | q | Fastest non-qualifiers | Q | Qualified | GR | Games record | NR | National record | PB | Personal best | SB | Seasonal best |

=== Final ===
The final was held on April.

| Rank | Name | Nationality | Time | Notes |
|---|---|---|---|---|
| 1st place, gold medalist(s) | Alice Driscoll | United States | 2:56.2 | |
| 2nd place, silver medalist(s) | Roby Whipple | United States | 2:57.7 | |
| 3rd place, bronze medalist(s) | Marjon Wilmink | Canada | 3:00.0 | |
| 4 | Susana Peper | Argentina | 3:03.7 | |
| 5 | Margela Berja | Mexico | 3:05.9 | |
| 6 | Maria Lidia Lesot | Argentina | 3:10:6 | |
| 7 | – | – | – | |
| 8 | – | – | – | |
