= Swimming at the 1987 Pan American Games – Men's 200 metre breaststroke =

Men's 200 metre breaststroke at the 1987 Pan American Games
- Venue: Indiana University Natatorium
- Dates: August 13 (preliminaries and finals)
- Competitors: from - nations

Medalists
Gold medal	Jeff Kubiak	United States
Silver medal	Mike Barrowman	United States
Bronze medal	Darcy Wallingford	Canada

The men's 200 metre breaststroke competition of the swimming events at the 1987 Pan American Games took place on 13 August at the Indiana University Natatorium. The last Pan American Games champion was Steve Lundquist of US.

This race consisted of four lengths of the pool, all in breaststroke.

== Results ==
All times are in minutes and seconds.

KEY:	q	Fastest non-qualifiers	Q	Qualified	GR	Games record	NR	National record	PB	Personal best	SB	Seasonal best

=== Final ===
The final was held on August 13.

Rank	Name	Nationality	Time	Notes
1st place, gold medalist(s)	Jeff Kubiak	United States	2:17.62	GR
2nd place, silver medalist(s)	Mike Barrowman	United States	2:19.29	
3rd place, bronze medalist(s)	Darcy Wallingford	Canada	2:22.01	
4	Javier Careaga	Mexico	2:22.44	
5	Marco Cavazzoni	Canada	2:22.63	
6	Manuel Gutiérrez	Panama	2:24.96	
7	Cícero Tortelli	Brazil	2:24.96	
8	Paul Newallo	Trinidad and Tobago	2:26.36	
