= Gilberto Martínez (swimmer) =

Colombian swimmer (1934–2017)

Personal information
- Born: 24 March 1934
- Died: 3 January 2017 (aged 82)

Sport
- Sport: Swimming
Medal record
Representing Colombia
Men's swimming
Pan American Games
Bronze medal – third place	1955 Mexico City	1500 m freestyle
Central American and Caribbean Games
Gold medal – first place	1954 Mexico City	1500 m freestyle

Gilberto Martínez (24 March 1934 – 3 January 2017) was a Colombian swimmer. He competed in the men's 400 metre freestyle at the 1956 Summer Olympics, where he was eliminated in the heats.
