= Swimming at the 1987 Pan American Games – Women's 100 metre breaststroke =

Women's 100 metre breaststroke at the 1987 Pan American Games
- Venue: Indiana University Natatorium
- Dates: August 13 (preliminaries and finals)
- Competitors: from - nations

Medalists
Gold medal	Keltie Duggan	Canada
Silver medal	Lori Heisick	United States
Bronze medal	Terri Baxter	United States

The women's 100 metre breaststroke competition of the swimming events at the 1987 Pan American Games took place on 13 August at the Indiana University Natatorium. The last Pan American Games champion was Anne Ottenbrite of Canada.

This race consisted of two lengths of the pool, both lengths being in breaststroke.

== Results ==
All times are in minutes and seconds.

KEY:	q	Fastest non-qualifiers	Q	Qualified	GR	Games record	NR	National record	PB	Personal best	SB	Seasonal best

=== Final ===
The final was held on August 13.

Rank	Name	Nationality	Time	Notes
1st place, gold medalist(s)	Keltie Duggan	Canada	1:12.46	
2nd place, silver medalist(s)	Lori Heisick	United States	1:12.52	
3rd place, bronze medalist(s)	Terri Baxter	United States	1:12.99	
4	Alicia Boscatto	Argentina	1:13.58	
5	Valentina Aracil	Argentina	1:15.44	
6	Karen Horning	Peru	1:15.59	
7	Georgiana Magalhães	Brazil	1:16.52	
8	Kathy Ruiz	Puerto Rico	1:17.97	
