= ¡Americano! (musical) =

2020 American musical about Tony Valdovinos

- Off-Broadway poster
- Music: Carrie Rodriguez
- Lyrics: Carrie Rodriguez; Michael Barnard; Jonathan Rosenberg; Fernanda Santos
- Book: Michael Barnard; Jonathan Rosenberg; Fernanda Santos
- Premiere: January 29, 2020: Phoenix Theatre
- Productions: 2020 Phoenix Theatre; 2022 Off-Broadway

¡Americano! is a musical telling based on the real-life story of Antonio (Tony) Valdovinos, a resident of the United States who learns that he is not a U.S. citizen when he tries to enlist in the U.S. Marine Corps. The script was written by Michael Barnard, Jonathan Rosenberg, and Fernanda Santos; Carrie Rodriguez composed the music. Barnard, Rosenberg, Santos and Rodriguez are credited together as lyricists.

== Synopsis ==
Inspired by the September 11 attacks when he was in sixth grade, and not wanting to pursue his father's career in construction, Tony goes to a Marine enlistment office on his 18th birthday. He is surprised to learn that he is an undocumented immigrant, and is upset with his parents for not telling him. Tony's friend Joaquin invites him to a meeting about the Deferred Action for Childhood Arrivals program that offers the possibility of legal work for those like him who were brought to the United States as children. He becomes a political activist to find a way to serve.

== Development ==
The play began development in 2015, when a public radio story about Valdovinos came to the attention of theatre producer Jason Rose and the Phoenix Theatre's long-time artistic director, Michael Barnard. The Off-Broadway performance was produced by Jason Roses' company, Quixote Productions in association with Chicanos Por La Causa, a social advocacy organization that fights discrimination against Mexican-Americans.

Valdovinos's status as someone brought to the United States as a child without documentation makes him a "Dreamer", a reference to the DREAM Act, a legislative proposal to create a right to work and path to citizenship for those brought to the United States as children. Speaking about the play, the real-life Valdovinos told the New York Times, “Dreamers have lost hope and live with fear. Part of the message here is don’t lose the courage — continue holding on to hope. Nothing comes easy. Elections matter. Policies matter. People matter. ‘¡Americano!’ is about that.”

== Productions ==
The play's world premiere was on at the Phoenix Theatre Company on January 29, 2020. It had its Off-Broadway debut at New World Stages on May 1, 2022 where it was scheduled as a limited run. It closed June 19, 2022. Both productions were directed by Michael Bernard and starred Sean Ewing as Tony; Sergio Mejia was the choreographer for both productions.

== Casting ==
Character	Phoenix Theatre Company	Off-Broadway
Character	2020	2022
Tony Valdovinos	Sean Ewing	Sean Ewing
Ceci López	Alyssa Gomez	Lenga Cedilla
Martin Valdovinos	Joseph Cannon	Alex Paez
Felicitas Valdovinos	Johana Carlisle-Zepeda	Johana Carlisle-Zepeda
Fro (Hector) Valdovinos	Edgar Lopez	Ryan Reyes
Jessica Bazán	Shani Barret	Carolina Miranda
Delores / Olivia / Marsha	Sonia Rodriguez Wood	Yassmin Alers
Carlos Ledesma	Justin Figueroa	Justin Figueroa
Manny Sandoval	Joseph Paul Cavazos	Joseph Paul Cavazos
Celso Bazán	Ricco Machado-Torres	Juan Luis Espinal
Gigi / Mrs. Lawrence / The Judge	Anne-Lise Koyabe	Anne-Lise Koyabe
Joaquin Flores	Lucas Coatney-Murrieta	Lucas Coatney-Murrieta
Javi García	Michael Scott Gomez	Pablo Torres

== Reception ==
Reviews of both productions note the strength of the singing and choreography, and Rodriguez's Tejano- and indie-rock-inspired score. Writing for Theatre Mania, reviewer Zachary Stewart writes that it is an "unapologetically sincere flag-waving American musical — and that feels like a breath of fresh air in an age of snark and cynicism." The New York Times's Jose Solís called it "a story as urgent as it is entertaining."
