= Swimming at the 1979 Pan American Games – Women's 100 metre breaststroke =

Women's 100 metre breaststroke at the 1979 Pan American Games
- Venue: Piscina Olimpica Del Escambron
- Dates: July 3 (preliminaries and finals)
- Competitors: from - nations

Medalists
Gold medal	Tami Paumier	United States
Silver medal	Tracy Caulkins	United States
Bronze medal	Anne Gagnon	Canada

The women's 100 metre breaststroke competition of the swimming events at the 1979 Pan American Games took place on 3 July at the Piscina Olimpica Del Escambron. The last Pan American Games champion was Lauri Siering of US.

This race consisted of two lengths of the pool, both lengths being in breaststroke.

== Results ==
All times are in minutes and seconds.

KEY:	q	Fastest non-qualifiers	Q	Qualified	GR	Games record	NR	National record	PB	Personal best	SB	Seasonal best

=== Heats ===
The first round was held on July 3.

Rank	Name	Nationality	Time	Notes
1	Tami Paumier	United States	1:14.47	Q
2	Tracy Caulkins	United States	1:14.93	Q
3	Anne Gagnon	Canada	1:15.34	Q
4	Robin Corsiglia	Canada	1:16.24	Q
5	Elke Holtz	Mexico	1:16.47	Q
6	Maria Matta	Brazil	1:17.52	Q
7	Alicia Boscatto	Argentina	1:17.74	Q, NR
8	Vilma Aguilera	Puerto Rico	1:18.42	Q
9	Yolanda Mendiola	Mexico	1:18.48	
10	Agnes Nilsson	Brazil	1:20.26	
11	Georgette Ednes	Bermuda	1:23.82	NR

=== Final ===
The final was held on July 3.

Rank	Name	Nationality	Time	Notes
1st place, gold medalist(s)	Tami Paumier	United States	1:12.20	NR, GR
2nd place, silver medalist(s)	Tracy Caulkins	United States	1:12.52	
3rd place, bronze medalist(s)	Anne Gagnon	Canada	1:14.38	
4	Robin Corsiglia	Canada	1:15.45	
5	Elke Holtz	Mexico	1:15.45	NR
6	Maria Matta	Brazil	1:17.76	
7	Alicia Boscatto	Argentina	1:17.85	
8	Vilma Aguilera	Puerto Rico	1:18.12	NR
