= Swimming at the 1999 Pan American Games – Men's 200 metre butterfly =

Men's 200 metre butterfly at the 1999 Pan American Games
- Venue: Pan Am Pool
- Dates: August 6 (preliminaries and finals)
- Competitors: from - nations

Medalists
Gold medal	Shamek Pietucha	Canada
Silver medal	Steven Brown	United States
Bronze medal	Devin Howard	United States

The men's 200 metre butterfly competition of the swimming events at the 1999 Pan American Games took place on 6 August at the Pan Am Pool. The last Pan American Games champion was Nelson Mora of Venezuela.

This race consisted of four lengths of the pool, all lengths being in butterfly stroke.

== Results ==
All times are in minutes and seconds.

KEY:	q	Fastest non-qualifiers	Q	Qualified	GR	Games record	NR	National record	PB	Personal best	SB	Seasonal best

=== Heats ===
The first round was held on August 6.

Rank	Name	Nationality	Time	Notes
1	Shamek Pietucha	Canada	1:58.50	Q, GR
2	Steven Brown	United States	1:59.29	Q
3	-	-	-	Q
4	-	-	-	Q
5	Devin Howard	United States	1:59.90	Q
6	-	-	-	Q
7	-	-	-	Q
8	-	-	-	Q

=== B Final ===
The B final was held on August 6.

Rank	Name	Nationality	Time	Notes
9	Malvin Viamontes	Cuba	2:04.03	
10	Roberto Delgado	Ecuador	2:04.53	
11	Juan Valdivieso	Peru	2:04.68	
12	E.A.Aguilar	El Salvador	2:08.31	
13	Sergio Cabrera	Paraguay	2:08.46	
14	Sebastian Thoret	Ecuador	2:08.81	
15	Luis Bracamonte	Peru	2:09.13	

=== A Final ===
The A final was held on August 6.

Rank	Name	Nationality	Time	Notes
1st place, gold medalist(s)	Shamek Pietucha	Canada	1:59.10	
2nd place, silver medalist(s)	Steven Brown	United States	1:59.52	
3rd place, bronze medalist(s)	Devin Howard	United States	1:59.82	
4	Andrew Livingston	Puerto Rico	2:00.05	
5	Juan Veloz	Mexico	2:00.06	
6	Philip Weiss	Canada	2:00.34	
7	Joshua Ilika	Mexico	2:01.98	
8	Nelson Mora	Venezuela	2:02.73	
