= Marian Stuart =

Canadian swimmer (born 1954)

Personal information
- Born: 6 December 1954 (age 71) Montreal, Quebec, Canada

Sport
- Sport: Swimming
Medal record
Women's swimming
Representing Canada
Commonwealth Games
Gold medal – first place	1974 Christchurch	4×100 m medley
Gold medal – first place	1978 Edmonton	4×100 m medley
Silver medal – second place	1974 Christchurch	100 m breaststroke
Bronze medal – third place	1978 Edmonton	100 m breaststroke
Pan American Games
Bronze medal – third place	1975 Mexico City	100 m breaststroke
Universiade
Gold medal – first place	1977 Sofia	100 m breaststroke

Marian Stuart (born 6 December 1954) is a Canadian former swimmer. She competed in two events at the 1972 Summer Olympics.
