= Swimming at the 1991 Pan American Games – Women's 400 metre freestyle =

Women's 400 metre freestyle at the 1991 Pan American Games
- Venue: -
- Dates: August 14 (preliminaries and finals)
- Competitors: from - nations

Medalists
Gold medal	Jane Skillman	United States
Silver medal	Barbara Metz	United States
Bronze medal	Tara Seymour	Canada

The women's 400 metre freestyle competition of the swimming events at the 1991 Pan American Games took place on 14 August. The last Pan American Games champion was Julie Martin of US.

This race consisted of eight lengths of the pool, with all eight being in the freestyle stroke.

== Results ==
All times are in minutes and seconds.

KEY:	q	Fastest non-qualifiers	Q	Qualified	GR	Games record	NR	National record	PB	Personal best	SB	Seasonal best

=== Final ===
The final was held on August 14.

Rank	Name	Nationality	Time	Notes
1st place, gold medalist(s)	Jane Skillman	United States	4:13.69	
2nd place, silver medalist(s)	Barbara Metz	United States	4:16.90	
3rd place, bronze medalist(s)	Tara Seymour	Canada	4:22.15	
4	Viviane Motti	Brazil	4:25.74	
5	Kim Paton	Canada	4:25.82	
6	Sonia Alvarez	Puerto Rico	4:28.53	
7	Susana Goldsmith	Mexico	4:28.78	
8	Beatriz Lages	Brazil	4:29.22	
