= Manuel Sanguily =

Cuban swimmer (1933–2022)

Personal information
- Full name: Manuel Sanguily Betancourt
- Born: 7 February 1933 Havana, Cuba
- Died: 15 November 2022 (aged 89) Tarrytown, New York, U.S.

Sport
- Sport: Swimming
- Strokes: Breaststroke
Medal record
Men's swimming
Representing Cuba
Pan American Games
| Silver medal – second place | 1955 Mexico City | 200 m breaststroke |
| Bronze medal – third place | 1959 Chicago | 200 m breaststroke |
Central American and Caribbean Games
| Gold medal – first place | 1954 Mexico City | 200 m breaststroke |

Manuel Sanguily (7 February 1933 – 15 November 2022) was a Cuban-American physician and swimmer who represented Cuba in the 1952 Summer Olympics and in the 1956 Summer Olympics. He was also the flag bearer for Cuba at the 1956 games.

Following his retirement from swimming, he studied medicine at La Habana Medical School. After the school was closed by Fidel Castro, Sanguilly moved to the United States and studied at Ohio State University. He worked as a doctor at a practice in Circleville, Ohio before moving to Tarrytown, New York and working in private practice. In 2010, he was sentenced to thirty months in prison for his role in large-scale prescription fraud.

Sanguily died in November 2022, from complications of COVID-19.
