= Swimming at the 1959 Pan American Games – Women's 200 metre breaststroke =

Women's 200 metre breaststroke at the I959 Pan American Games
- Venue: -
- Dates: September 1 (preliminaries and finals)

Medalists
| Gold medal | Anne Warner | United States |
| Silver medal | Patty Kemper | United States |
| Bronze medal | Anne Brancroft | United States |

The women's 200 metre breaststroke competition of the swimming events at the 1959 Pan American Games took place on 1 September. The last Pan American Games champion was Mary Lou Elsenius of US.

This race consisted of four lengths of the pool, all in breaststroke.

== Results ==
All times are in minutes and seconds.

| KEY: | q | Fastest non-qualifiers | Q | Qualified | GR | Games record | NR | National record | PB | Personal best | SB | Seasonal best |

=== Heats ===
The first round was held on September 1.

| Rank | Heat | Name | Nationality | Time | Notes |
|---|---|---|---|---|---|
| 1 | 2 | Anne Warner | United States | 2:56.4 | Q, GR |
| - | - | Patty Kemper | United States | - | Q |
| - | - | Anne Brancroft | United States | - | Q |
| - | - | Mary Whitwill | Canada | - | Q |
| - | - | Janice Shepp | Canada | - | Q |
| - | - | Bonnie Benson | Canada | - | Q |
| - | - | Glória Betella | Mexico | - | Q |
| - | - | Sônia Escher | Brazil | 3:14.1 | Q |

=== Final ===
The final was held on September 1.

| Rank | Name | Nationality | Time | Notes |
|---|---|---|---|---|
| 1st place, gold medalist(s) | Anne Warner | United States | 2:56.8 | |
| 2nd place, silver medalist(s) | Patty Kemper | United States | 3:00.1 | |
| 3rd place, bronze medalist(s) | Anne Brancroft | United States | 3:01.3 | |
| 4 | - | - | - | |
| 5 | - | - | - | |
| 6 | - | - | - | |
| 7 | - | - | - | |
| 8 | - | - | - | |
