= Swimming at the 1995 Pan American Games – Women's 400 metre individual medley =

Women's 400 metre individual medley at the 1995 Pan American Games
- Venue: Complejo Natatorio
- Dates: between March 12–17 (preliminaries and finals)
- Competitors: from - nations

Medalists
Gold medal	Joanne Malar	Canada
Silver medal	Alison Fealey	United States
Bronze medal	Jenny Kurth	United States

The women's 400 metre individual medley competition of the swimming events at the 1995 Pan American Games took place between March 12–17 at the Complejo Natatorio. The last Pan American Games champion was Amy Shaw of US.

This race consisted of eight lengths of the pool. The first two lengths were swum using the butterfly stroke, the second pair with the backstroke, the third pair of lengths in breaststroke, and the final two were freestyle.

== Results ==
All times are in minutes and seconds.

KEY:	q	Fastest non-qualifiers	Q	Qualified	GR	Games record	NR	National record	PB	Personal best	SB	Seasonal best

=== Final ===
The final was held between March 12–17.

Rank	Name	Nationality	Time	Notes
1st place, gold medalist(s)	Joanne Malar	Canada	4:43.64	
2nd place, silver medalist(s)	Alison Fealey	United States	4:48.31	
3rd place, bronze medalist(s)	Jenny Kurth	United States	4:57.24	
4	Sonia Fonseca	Puerto Rico	5:03.15	
5	Fabíola Molina	Brazil	5:03.43	
6	Isabel Rojas	Colombia	5:11.58	
7	Carolyn Adel	Suriname	5:13.24	
8	Edith Arraspide	Argentina	5:13.95	
