= Nelson Mora =

Venezuelan swimmer

Personal information
- Full name: Nelson Jesús Mora Molina
- National team: Venezuela
- Born: Caracas, Venezuela

Sport
- Sport: Swimming
- Strokes: Butterfly
- College team: University of Miami (U.S.) (1996-98); Florida State University (U.S.) (1999-00)
Medal record
Men's swimming
Representing Venezuela
Pan American Games
Gold medal – first place	1995 Mar de Plata	200 meters Butterfly

Nelson Jesús Mora Molina is a former butterfly swimmer from Venezuela who won the 200-metre butterfly at the 1995 Pan American Games in Mar del Plata, Argentina. Mora is the first Venezuelan to win a Pan American Games gold medal in swimming. Mora represented his native country in the 1996 Summer Olympics.

== Career ==
He attended the University of Miami in Coral Gables, Florida, from 1996 to 1998, where he swam for the Miami Hurricanes swimming and diving team. He was named an honorable mention All-American with 12th-place finish in the 200-yard butterfly (1:47.50) at the 1997 NCAA Championships. He also won the 200-yard butterfly at the 1997 Big East Conference Championships while setting a championships record (1:47.63) and earning All-Conference honors. He placed fourth in the 500-yard freestyle (4:29.13), eighth in the 100-yard butterfly (50.14, and was a member of second-place 800-yard freestyle relay and third-place 400-yard freestyle relay teams> Mora received the 1997 IBIS award and was recognized as a 1996-97 Big East Academic All-Star.

In 1999, he transferred to Florida State University in Tallahassee, Florida, where he swam for the Florida State Seminoles swimming and diving team in the National Collegiate Athletic Association (NCAA) competition in 1999, and was gain named an honorable mention All-America with the Seminoles' 16th-place finish in the 800-yard freestyle relay.
