= Swimming at the 1971 Pan American Games – Women's 200 metre backstroke =

Women's 200 metre backstroke at the 1971 Pan American Games
- Venue: -
- Dates: August 9 (preliminaries and finals)
- Competitors: from - nations

Medalists
Gold medal	Donna Gurr	Canada
Silver medal	Susie Atwood	United States
Bronze medal	Barbara Darby	United States

The women's 200 metre backstroke competition of the swimming events at the 1971 Pan American Games took place on 9 August. The last Pan American Games champion was Elaine Tanner of Canada.

This race consisted of four lengths of the pool, all in backstroke.

== Results ==
All times are in minutes and seconds.

KEY:	q	Fastest non-qualifiers	Q	Qualified	GR	Games record	NR	National record	PB	Personal best	SB	Seasonal best

=== Final ===
The final was held on August 9.

Rank	Name	Nationality	Time	Notes
1st place, gold medalist(s)	Donna Gurr	Canada	2:24.7	
2nd place, silver medalist(s)	Susie Atwood	United States	2:26.5	
3rd place, bronze medalist(s)	Barbara Darby	United States	2:30.7	
4	Adriana Grebnikof	Argentina	2:36.8	
5	Patrícia Muniz	Argentina	2:38.6	
6	Lucila Martins	Brazil	2:43.1	
7	Cristiane Paquelet	Brazil	2:44.3	
8	Patrícia Hernandez	Mexico	2:45.0	
