= Swimming at the 1983 Pan American Games – Women's 100 metre breaststroke =

Women's 100 metre breaststroke at the 1983 Pan American Games
- Venue: -
- Dates: August 20 (preliminaries and finals)
- Competitors: from - nations

Medalists
Gold medal	Anne Ottenbrite	Canada
Silver medal	Kathy Bald	Canada
Bronze medal	Kim Rhodenbaugh	United States

The women's 100 metre breaststroke competition of the swimming events at the 1983 Pan American Games took place on 20 August. The last Pan American Games champion was Tami Paumier of US.

This race consisted of two lengths of the pool, both lengths being in breaststroke.

== Results ==
All times are in minutes and seconds.

KEY:	q	Fastest non-qualifiers	Q	Qualified	GR	Games record	NR	National record	PB	Personal best	SB	Seasonal best

=== Final ===
The final was held on August 20.

Rank	Name	Nationality	Time	Notes
1st place, gold medalist(s)	Anne Ottenbrite	Canada	1:10.63	NR, GR
2nd place, silver medalist(s)	Kathy Bald	Canada	1:11.98	
3rd place, bronze medalist(s)	Kim Rhodenbaugh	United States	1:12.19	
4	Tracy Caulkins	United States	1:12.51	
5	Alicia Boscatto	Argentina	1:15.22	
6	Miriam Sacco	Venezuela	1:16.76	
7	Magdalena Frigo	Venezuela	1:17.27	
8	Silvia Rivero	Mexico	1:17.45	
