= Swimming at the 1983 Pan American Games – Women's 200 metre breaststroke =

Women's 200 metre breaststroke at the 1983 Pan American Games
- Venue: -
- Dates: August 18 (preliminaries and finals)
- Competitors: from - nations

Medalists
Gold medal	Kathy Bald	Canada
Silver medal	Susan Rapp	United States
Bronze medal	Kim Rhodenbaugh	United States

The women's 200 metre breaststroke competition of the swimming events at the 1983 Pan American Games took place on 18 August. The last Pan American Games champion was Anne Gagnon of Canada.

This race consisted of four lengths of the pool, all in breaststroke.

== Results ==
All times are in minutes and seconds.

KEY:	q	Fastest non-qualifiers	Q	Qualified	GR	Games record	NR	National record	PB	Personal best	SB	Seasonal best

=== Final ===
The final was held on August 18.

Rank	Name	Nationality	Time	Notes
1st place, gold medalist(s)	Kathy Bald	Canada	2:35.53	GR
2nd place, silver medalist(s)	Susan Rapp	United States	2:37.91	
3rd place, bronze medalist(s)	Kim Rhodenbaugh	United States	2:39.03	
4	Alicia Boscatto	Argentina	2:41.20	
5	Miriam Sacco	Venezuela	2:46.81	
6	Magdalena Frigo	Venezuela	2:48.21	
7	Rosa Silva	Uruguay	2:53.04	
8	Vilma Aguilera	Puerto Rico	2:55.24	
