= Swimming at the 1975 Pan American Games – Women's 800 metre freestyle =

Women's 800 metre freestyle at the 1975 Pan American Games
- Venue: -
- Dates: October 24 (preliminaries and finals)
- Competitors: from - nations

Medalists
Gold medal	Wendy Weinberg	United States
Silver medal	Mary Montgomery	United States
Bronze medal	Janice Stenhouse	Canada

The women's 800 metre freestyle competition of the swimming events at the 1975 Pan American Games took place on 24 October. The last Pan American Games champion was Cathy Calhoun of US.

This race consisted of sixteen lengths of the pool, all in freestyle.

== Results ==
All times are in minutes and seconds.

KEY:	q	Fastest non-qualifiers	Q	Qualified	GR	Games record	NR	National record	PB	Personal best	SB	Seasonal best

=== Final ===
The final was held on October 24.

Rank	Name	Nationality	Time	Notes
1st place, gold medalist(s)	Wendy Weinberg	United States	9:05.57	
2nd place, silver medalist(s)	Mary Montgomery	United States	9:06.70	
3rd place, bronze medalist(s)	Janice Stenhouse	Canada	9:17.87	
4	-	-	-	
5	-	-	-	
6	Maria Guimarães	Brazil	9:45.37	
7	-	-	-	
8	-	-	-	
