= Claude Lamy =

Canadian swimmer

Sport
- Country: Canada
- Sport: Swimming
- Event: Freestyle
Medal record
Commonwealth Games
Gold medal – first place	1986 Edinburgh	4 × 100 m medley
Pan American Games
Silver medal – second place	1987 Indianapolis	4 × 100 m freestyle
Silver medal – second place	1987 Indianapolis	4 × 100 m medley
Bronze medal – third place	1987 Indianapolis	50 m freestyle

Claude Lamy is a Canadian former swimmer of the 1980s.

Lamy, a native of Quebec, was predominantly a freestyle swimmer and trained with Université Laval. He was a member of the gold medal-winning 4 × 100 m medley relay team at the 1986 Commonwealth Games in Edinburgh, swimming in the heats. At the 1987 Pan American Games in Indianapolis, Lamy claimed a bronze medal in the 50 m freestyle and won two relay silver medals. He came sixth in the 50 m freestyle at the 1987 Summer Universiade in Zagreb.
