= Donna Gurr =

Canadian swimmer (born 1955)

Personal information
- Full name: Donna-Marie Gurr
- National team: Canada
- Born: February 18, 1955 (age 71) Vancouver, British Columbia, Canada
- Height: 1.67 m (5 ft 6 in)
- Weight: 50 kg (110 lb)

Sport
- Sport: Swimming
- Strokes: Backstroke, freestyle
- Club: Pacific Dolphins
Medal record
Women's swimming
Representing Canada
Olympic Games
Bronze medal – third place	1972 Munich	200 m backstroke
British Commonwealth Games
Silver medal – second place	1970 Edinburgh	200 m backstroke
Silver medal – second place	1974 Christchurch	100 m backstroke
Bronze medal – third place	1970 Edinburgh	100 m backstroke
Bronze medal – third place	1970 Edinburgh	4×100 m medley
Bronze medal – third place	1974 Christchurch	200 m backstroke
Pan American Games
Gold medal – first place	1971 Cali	100 m backstroke
Gold medal – first place	1971 Cali	200 m backstroke
Gold medal – first place	1971 Cali	4×100 m medley
Silver medal – second place	1971 Cali	4×100 m freestyle

Donna-Marie Gurr, CM (born February 18, 1955) is a former swimmer from Canada, who won the bronze medal in the 200m backstroke at the 1972 Summer Olympics.

== Swimming career ==
Gurr competed in the backstroke and freestyle events at the 1972 Summer Olympics in Munich, Germany. There she won the bronze medal in the 200-metre backstroke. In 1976, she was made a Member of the Order of Canada, Canada's highest achievement award, in a ceremony at Rideau Hall in Ottawa. She was inducted into the BC Sports Hall of Fame in 1987, the BC Swimming Hall of Fame in 2004, and the Canadian Aquatic Hall of Fame.

Gurr started swimming at the newly built Arbutus Club in Vancouver in 1965, and later joined the Canadian Dolphin Swim Club, where her idol Elaine Tanner swam and was coached by Howard Firby. She qualified for her first Senior Nationals at age 12, placing 12th in one event. At the age of 13 she narrowly missed a berth on the 1968 Olympic team by placing 3rd in the 200-metre backstroke, at the Olympic Trials, and missing the qualifying time by only 3 tenths of a second. During the summer of 1969, aged 14, the Canadian Dolphins went on their first trip to Europe, where they attended the ASA British Championships in Blackpool. She won five gold medals, swimming in both the junior and senior events, with the significant prize of winning the senior 100 metres backstroke and 200 metres backstroke titles.

Next they attended the Canadian Nationals in Montreal, where she won her first National titles in the 100M and 200-metre backstroke, and came away with 4 gold and one silver medal. The team went on to the first Canada Games in Halifax where she won 5 gold medals. She was National Champion in the 100 and 200-metre backstroke from 1969-1972.

During her career, Gurr had many health problems and injuries. After the very successful summer of 1969, she began to experience pain in her left knee. X-rays showed a problem, Osteochondritis dissecans of the left femoral condyle, in which a part of the bone, was becoming detached from the femur. It was determined by her orthopedic surgeon Dr. Hector Gillespie, and her GP, sports medicine expert Dr. Doug Clement that surgery was needed to pin the loosened piece of bone in place. In December 1969 she entered the hospital for the surgery. Much to her surprise, when wheeled into the operating room, she was told of a change of plans. Due to her young age, it was hoped that with crutches and a specialized cast, from hip to ankle, the knee would heal on its own. The cast was made from heated and molded foam rubber, and secured by fiberglass dipped in acetone, and wrapped around the inner foam layer. When it dried, it weighed almost nothing, and she could continue her training. This was the prototype for the lightweight fiberglass casts used by many people today.

Gurr began training, virtually only being able to use one leg while swimming and doing the turns at each end of the pool, and using the crutches at all times, with no weight bearing on that leg. Not missing months of training was very important at this time, as her first International Games, the Commonwealth Games, were coming up in the summer of 1970. The cast was removed twice, once to qualify for the Games trials, and then again for the Commonwealth Trials in Edmonton. She finished first at the trials, despite swimming with the use of only one leg and made the team in the 100 and 200-metre backstroke. Crutches were used at all times while walking. The cast came off for good in May 1970, and the knee was deemed healed.

It took quite a while to get the knee and leg working again properly after 6 months of the cast and crutches, but two months later Gurr won three medals at the Commonwealth Games in Edinburgh. It was quite a remarkable accomplishment. She won a silver medal in the 200-metre backstroke, and a bronze in the 100-metre backstroke and another bronze in the 4x100-metre medley relay in Edinburgh at the Commonwealth Games of 1970 at age 15. She was awarded the BC Junior Athlete of the Year in 1970.

In 1971, at 16 years old, Gurr won 3 gold and one silver medal at the Pan-American Games in Cali, Colombia. The gold medals were in the Women's 4x100M Medley Relay, and the 100 and 200M Backstroke events. The silver medal was in the 4x100M Freestyle Relay. During the final of the 200M Backstroke, at about the 75M mark, all the power in the area went out. As it was an outdoor pool, at night, this caused the race to come to an abrupt halt. Who knows what the outcome would have been had the race continued, but it was decided by the coaches and swimmers to re-swim the final after the other races that night. And Gurr did win on the second try.

By the time of the 1972 Olympic Trials and Games, Gurr was having trouble with a spinal problem, aggravated by all the training, and tendonitis in both shoulders. Cortisone shots were given at some points so she could continue training and competing leading up to Munich. At 17 was the bronze medal in the 200-metre backstroke in Munich, while at the Olympic Trials that year, she broke Elaine Tanner's Canadian record in the 100-metre backstroke, she had broken the 200-metre record earlier. She barely made it into the final of the 200-metre backstroke, qualifying 8th and swimming the race in lane 8, which is considered the worst lane and the battle for the bronze medal was very close among several of the swimmers. She missed making the final of the 100-metre backstroke by 3/100ths of a second, a disappointing result. But she was happy to win the bronze in the 200-metre, on the last night of the swimming competition.

At 18, in 1973, Gurr competed in the first World Aquatic Championships in Belgrade, and at 19, in 1974, she went to her second Commonwealth Games in Christchurch, New Zealand and won a silver and bronze medal. These were in the 100 and 200-metre backstroke events. She held numerous Canadian records in age group swimming and the senior events, as an individual and as a member of many relay teams, for the Canadian Dolphins and while representing Canada internationally. Although being an excellent individual medley swimmer (200 metre), after the cast came off her knee, she had trouble doing the dolphin kick properly, and afterwards could not swim butterfly or medley events.

After the Christchurch Commonwealth Games, Gurr took a long break from swimming, and did compete again during the summer of 1976. She competed at the Santa Clara International Meet and in the 1976 Olympic Trials, but did not qualify for the team. She then retired from the sport.

During her career Gurr traveled extensively, all over Canada and the United States, competing at the Santa Clara International Meet every summer. She traveled to England numerous times, attending the Coca-Cola International Meet in London in the spring, for several years, and on other occasions as well. She traveled to Scotland, Holland, Germany twice, Switzerland, Norway, France, Austria and the former Yugoslavia. She also visited New Zealand twice, Australia once, where she met Dawn Fraser, a swimming icon, at the New South Wales Championships in January 1972. She also went to Hawaii, Fiji, and Cali, Colombia in 1971 for the Pan-Am Games.

== Awards ==
Gurr was chosen as one of the recipients of the Queen Elizabeth ll Diamond Jubilee Medal, which will be awarded at a special presentation ceremony in April 2012. The medals will be presented by the Lieutenant Governor of British Columbia.

On April 5, 2013 at the World Championship Trials in Victoria, British Columbia, Gurr was inducted into Swimming Canada's "Circle of Excellence". The presentation was made before the start of the finals and she was accompanied by her coach Deryk Snelling and teammate Leslie Cliff, who are also Circle of Excellence members.

== Personal life ==
Gurr's coach for the majority of her career was Deryk Snelling, who many believe was the reason the Canadian Dolphin Team were National Team champions for so many years. Almost half of the Munich Olympic swim team were from the Canadian Dolphins, and the medals won by Leslie Cliff, Bruce Robertson, Bill Mahoney and Gurr accounted for almost all the medals won in Munich, including all sports. Gurr presently lives and works in Vancouver.

== See also ==
- List of Olympic medalists in swimming (women)
