= Swimming at the 1975 Pan American Games – Women's 100 metre breaststroke =

Women's 100 metre breaststroke at the 1975 Pan American Games
- Venue: -
- Dates: October 20 (preliminaries and finals)
- Competitors: from - nations

Medalists
| Gold medal | Lauri Siering | United States |
| Silver medal | Marcia Morey | United States |
| Bronze medal | Marion Stuart | Canada |

The women's 100 metre breaststroke competition of the swimming events at the 1975 Pan American Games took place on 20 October. The last Pan American Games champion was Sylvia Dockerill of Canada.

This race consisted of two lengths of the pool, both lengths being in breaststroke.

== Results ==
All times are in minutes and seconds.

| KEY: | q | Fastest non-qualifiers | Q | Qualified | GR | Games record | NR | National record | PB | Personal best | SB | Seasonal best |

=== Final ===
The final was held on October 20.

| Rank | Name | Nationality | Time | Notes |
|---|---|---|---|---|
| 1st place, gold medalist(s) | Lauri Siering | United States | 1:15.17 | |
| 2nd place, silver medalist(s) | Marcia Morey | United States | 1:16.25 | |
| 3rd place, bronze medalist(s) | Marion Stuart | Canada | 1:16.40 | |
| 4 | - | - | - | |
| 5 | Cristina Teixeira | Brazil | 1:18.71 | |
| 6 | - | - | - | |
| 7 | - | - | - | |
| 8 | - | - | - | |
