= Swimming at the 1991 Pan American Games – Women's 200 metre breaststroke =

Women's 200 metre breaststroke at the 1991 Pan American Games
- Venue: -
- Dates: August 13 (preliminaries and finals)
- Competitors: from - nations

Medalists
Gold medal	Dorsey Tierney	United States
Silver medal	Chantal Dubois	Canada
Bronze medal	Lisa Flood	Canada

The women's 200 metre breaststroke competition of the swimming events at the 1991 Pan American Games took place on 13 August. The last Pan American Games champion was Dorsey Tierney of US.

This race consisted of four lengths of the pool, all in breaststroke.

== Results ==
All times are in minutes and seconds.

KEY:	q	Fastest non-qualifiers	Q	Qualified	GR	Games record	NR	National record	PB	Personal best	SB	Seasonal best

=== Final ===
The final was held on August 13.

Rank	Name	Nationality	Time	Notes
1st place, gold medalist(s)	Dorsey Tierney	United States	2:28.69	GR
2nd place, silver medalist(s)	Chantal Dubois	Canada	2:33.62	
3rd place, bronze medalist(s)	Lisa Flood	Canada	2:34.08	
4	Kendra Thayer	United States	2:36.58	
5	Glycia Lofego	Brazil	2:43.01	
6	Karen Horning	Peru	2:44.96	
7	Erika Graff	Uruguay	2:45.96	
8	Monique Pinon	Mexico	2:46.85	
