= Swimming at the 1991 Pan American Games – Women's 100 metre breaststroke =

Women's 100 metre breaststroke at the 1991 Pan American Games
- Venue: -
- Dates: August 16 (preliminaries and finals)
- Competitors: from - nations

Medalists
Gold medal	Dorsey Tierney	United States
Silver medal	Lydia Morrow	United States
Bronze medal	Lisa Flood	Canada

The women's 100 metre breaststroke competition of the swimming events at the 1991 Pan American Games took place on 16 August. The last Pan American Games champion was Keltie Duggan of Canada.

This race consisted of two lengths of the pool, both lengths being in breaststroke.

== Results ==
All times are in minutes and seconds.

KEY:	q	Fastest non-qualifiers	Q	Qualified	GR	Games record	NR	National record	PB	Personal best	SB	Seasonal best

=== Final ===
The final was held on August 16.

Rank	Name	Nationality	Time	Notes
1st place, gold medalist(s)	Dorsey Tierney	United States	1:10.30	GR
2nd place, silver medalist(s)	Lydia Morrow	United States	1:11.00	
3rd place, bronze medalist(s)	Lisa Flood	Canada	1:11.75	
4	Chantal Dubois	Canada	1:13.89	
5	Karen Horning	Peru	1:15.07	
6	Jennifer Smatt	Bermuda	1:15.15	
7	Glycia Lofego	Brazil	1:15.21	
8	Fernanda Ferraz	Brazil	1:16.91	
