= Swimming at the 1987 Pan American Games – Women's 100 metre butterfly =

Women's 100 metre butterfly at the 1987 Pan American Games
- Venue: Indiana University Natatorium
- Dates: August 13 (preliminaries and finals)
- Competitors: from - nations

Medalists
Gold medal	Janel Jorgensen	United States
Silver medal	Kristen Elias	United States
Bronze medal	Robin Ruggiero	Canada

The women's 100 metre butterfly competition of the swimming events at the 1987 Pan American Games took place on 13 August at the Indiana University Natatorium. The last Pan American Games champion was Laurie Lehner of US.

This race consisted of two lengths of the pool, all in butterfly.

== Results ==
All times are in minutes and seconds.

KEY:	q	Fastest non-qualifiers	Q	Qualified	GR	Games record	NR	National record	PB	Personal best	SB	Seasonal best

=== Final ===
The final was held on August 13.

Rank	Name	Nationality	Time	Notes
1st place, gold medalist(s)	Janel Jorgensen	United States	1:01.28	
2nd place, silver medalist(s)	Kristen Elias	United States	1:01.54	
3rd place, bronze medalist(s)	Robin Ruggiero	Canada	1:03.67	
4	Sally Gilbert	Canada	1:03.91	
5	Gabriela Gaja	Mexico	1:04.68	
6	Marlene Bruten	Mexico	1:04.75	
7	Sandra Revette	Venezuela	1:04.97	
8	Deborah Reis	Brazil	1:05.44	
