= Swimming at the 1975 Pan American Games – Men's 200 metre butterfly =

Men's 200 metre butterfly at the 1975 Pan American Games
- Venue: -
- Dates: October 21 (preliminaries and finals)
- Competitors: from - nations

Medalists
Gold medal	Greg Jagenburg	United States
Silver medal	Steve Gregg	United States
Bronze medal	Jorge Delgado	Ecuador

The men's 200 metre butterfly competition of the swimming events at the 1975 Pan American Games took place on 21 October. The last Pan American Games champion was Jorge Delgado of Ecuador.

This race consisted of four lengths of the pool, all lengths being in butterfly stroke.

== Results ==
All times are in minutes and seconds.

KEY:	q	Fastest non-qualifiers	Q	Qualified	GR	Games record	NR	National record	PB	Personal best	SB	Seasonal best

=== Final ===
The final was held on October 21.

Rank	Name	Nationality	Time	Notes
1st place, gold medalist(s)	Greg Jagenburg	United States	2:03.42	
2nd place, silver medalist(s)	Steve Gregg	United States	2:04.06	
3rd place, bronze medalist(s)	Jorge Delgado	Ecuador	2:05.11	
4	-	-	-	
5	-	-	-	
6	-	-	-	
7	Eduardo Alijó	Brazil	2:11.37	
8	-	-	-	
