= Swimming at the 1987 Pan American Games – Men's 100 metre freestyle =

Men's 100 metre freestyle at the 1987 Pan American Games
- Venue: Indiana University Natatorium
- Dates: August 11 (preliminaries and finals)
- Competitors: from - nations

Medalists
Gold medal	Todd Dudley	United States
Silver medal	Scott McCadam	United States
Bronze medal	Mark Andrews	Trinidad and Tobago

The men's 100 metre freestyle competition of the swimming events at the 1987 Pan American Games took place on 11 August at the Indiana University Natatorium. The defending Pan American Games champion was Rowdy Gaines of the United States.

This race consisted of two lengths of the pool, both lengths being in freestyle.

== Results ==
All times are in minutes and seconds.

KEY:	q	Fastest non-qualifiers	Q	Qualified	GR	Games record	NR	National record	PB	Personal best	SB	Seasonal best

=== Final ===
The final was held on August 11.

Rank	Name	Nationality	Time	Notes
1st place, gold medalist(s)	Todd Dudley	United States	50.24	
2nd place, silver medalist(s)	Scott McCadam	United States	50.81	
3rd place, bronze medalist(s)	Mark Andrews	Trinidad and Tobago	51.24	
4	Claude Lamy	Canada	51.48	
5	Jorge Fernandes	Brazil	51.95	
6	Hilton Woods	Netherlands Antilles	52.13	
7	Darren Ward	Canada	52.38	
8	Antonio Portela	Puerto Rico	52.46	
