= Swimming at the 1991 Pan American Games – Men's 1500 metre freestyle =

Men's 1500 metre freestyle at the 1991 Pan American Games
- Venue: -
- Dates: August 18 (preliminaries and finals)
- Competitors: from - nations

Medalists
Gold medal	Alex Kostich	United States
Silver medal	Jorge Herrera	Puerto Rico
Bronze medal	Pedro Carrío	Cuba

The men's 1500 metre freestyle competition of the swimming events at the 1991 Pan American Games took place on 18 August. The last Pan American Games champion was Alex Kostich of US.

This race consisted of thirty lengths of the pool, all lengths being in freestyle.

== Results ==
All times are in minutes and seconds.

KEY:	q	Fastest non-qualifiers	Q	Qualified	GR	Games record	NR	National record	PB	Personal best	SB	Seasonal best

=== Final ===
The final was held on August 18.

Rank	Name	Nationality	Time	Notes
1st place, gold medalist(s)	Alex Kostich	United States	15:21.36	
2nd place, silver medalist(s)	Jorge Herrera	Puerto Rico	15:33.61	
3rd place, bronze medalist(s)	Pedro Carrío	Cuba	15:39.73	NR
4	Andres Minelli	Argentina	15:49.13	
5	David Castro	Brazil	15:51.11	
6	Yuri Hernández	Cuba	15:59.37	
7	Mauricio Ortiz	Mexico	16:11.51	
8	-	-	-	
