= Renee Laravie =

American swimmer (born 1959)

Personal information
- Full name: Renee A. Laravie
- National team: United States
- Born: July 14, 1959 (age 66) Decatur, Illinois, U.S.
- Height: 5 ft 11 in (1.80 m)
- Weight: 146 lb (66 kg)

Sport
- Sport: Swimming
- Strokes: Breaststroke
- College team: University of Florida

Renee A. Laravie (born July 14, 1959), also known by her married name Renee Kelly, is an American former competition swimmer who specialized in the breaststroke.

As a 17-year-old high school senior, Laravie represented the United States at the 1976 Summer Olympics in Montreal, Quebec. She competed in the women's 100-meter breaststroke and clocked a time of 1:16.76 in the preliminary heats, but did not advance to the event final.

Laravie attended the University of Florida in Gainesville, Florida, where she swam for coach Randy Reese's Florida Gators swimming and diving team in Association for Intercollegiate Athletics for Women (AIAW) competition from 1977 to 1979. She received ten All-American honors during her three-year college swimming career. She won three individual AIAW national titles, including the 100-meter breaststroke, 100-meter and 200-meter individual medley events, and two more AIAW national titles as a member of the Gators' winning relay teams in the 800-meter freestyle relay. Laravie was a key contributor to the Gators' 1979 AIAW national team championship. She was the 1977–78 recipient of the Honda Sports Award for Swimming and Diving, recognizing her as the outstanding college female swimmer of the year. Laravie was later inducted into the University of Florida Athletic Hall of Fame as a "Gator Great."

== See also ==
- List of University of Florida alumni
- List of University of Florida Athletic Hall of Fame members
- List of University of Florida Olympians
