= Swimming at the 1987 Pan American Games – Women's 200 metre butterfly =

Women's 200 metre butterfly at the 1987 Pan American Games
- Venue: Indiana University Natatorium
- Dates: August 15 (preliminaries and finals)
- Competitors: from - nations

Medalists
| Gold medal | Kara McGrath | United States |
| Silver medal | Michelle Griglione | United States |
| Bronze medal | Shay McNicol | Canada |

The women's 200 metre butterfly competition of the swimming events at the 1987 Pan American Games took place on 15 August at the Indiana University Natatorium. The last Pan American Games champion was Mary T. Meagher of US.

This race consisted of four lengths of the pool, all lengths being in butterfly stroke.

== Results ==
All times are in minutes and seconds.

| KEY: | q | Fastest non-qualifiers | Q | Qualified | GR | Games record | NR | National record | PB | Personal best | SB | Seasonal best |

=== Final ===
The final was held on August 15.

| Rank | Name | Nationality | Time | Notes |
|---|---|---|---|---|
| 1st place, gold medalist(s) | Kara McGrath | United States | 2:12.54 | |
| 2nd place, silver medalist(s) | Michelle Griglione | United States | 2:15.03 | |
| 3rd place, bronze medalist(s) | Shay McNicol | Canada | 2:17.78 | |
| 4 | Bianca Morales | Guatemala | 2:19.10 | |
| 5 | Marlene Bruten | Mexico | 2:19.75 | |
| 6 | Robin Ruggiero | Canada | 2:20.08 | |
| 7 | Sandra Revette | Venezuela | 2:21.04 | |
| 8 | Sandra Bohorquez | Colombia | 2:24.14 | |
