= Swimming at the 1963 Pan American Games – Women's 400 metre freestyle =

Women's 400 metre freestyle at the 1963 Pan American Games
- Venue: -

Medalists
Gold medal	Sharon Finneran	United States
Silver medal	Robyn Johnson	United States
Bronze medal	Lynne Pomfret	Canada

The women's 400 metre freestyle competition of the swimming events at the 1963 Pan American Games took place on April. The last Pan American Games champion was Chris von Saltza of US.

This race consisted of eight lengths of the pool, with all eight being in the freestyle stroke.

== Results ==
All times are in minutes and seconds.

KEY:	q	Fastest non-qualifiers	Q	Qualified	GR	Games record	NR	National record	PB	Personal best	SB	Seasonal best

=== Final ===
The final was held on April.

Rank	Name	Nationality	Time	Notes
1st place, gold medalist(s)	Sharon Finneran	United States	4:52.7	
2nd place, silver medalist(s)	Robyn Johnson	United States	4:56.1	
3rd place, bronze medalist(s)	Lynne Pomfret	Canada	5:20.4	
4	Sharon Pierce	Canada	5:23.3	
5	Maria Luísa Sousa	Mexico	5:23.9	
6	Vera Maria Formiga	Brazil	5:24:6	
7	-	-	-	
8	-	-	-	
