= Swimming at the 1975 Pan American Games – Women's 200 metre breaststroke =

Women's 200 metre breaststroke at the 1975 Pan American Games
- Venue: -
- Dates: October 22 (preliminaries and finals)
- Competitors: from - nations

Medalists
Gold medal	Lauri Siering	United States
Silver medal	Joann Baker	Canada
Bronze medal	Marcia Morey	United States

The women's 200 metre breaststroke competition of the swimming events at the 1975 Pan American Games took place on 22 October. The last Pan American Games champion was Lynn Colella of the United States.

This race consisted of four lengths of the pool, all in breaststroke.

== Results ==
All times are in minutes and seconds.

KEY:	q	Fastest non-qualifiers	Q	Qualified	GR	Games record	NR	National record	PB	Personal best	SB	Seasonal best

=== Final ===
The final was held on October 22.

Rank	Name	Nationality	Time	Notes
1st place, gold medalist(s)	Lauri Siering	United States	2:42.35	
2nd place, silver medalist(s)	Joann Baker	Canada	2:42.96	
3rd place, bronze medalist(s)	Marcia Morey	United States	2:45.58	
4	-	-	-	
5	Cristina Teixeira	Brazil	2:51.28	
6	-	-	-	
7	-	-	-	
8	-	-	-	
