= Swimming at the 1959 Pan American Games – Men's 200 metre breaststroke =

Men's 200 metre breaststroke at the I959 Pan American Games
- Venue: -
- Dates: August 31 (preliminaries), September 2 (finals)

Medalists
Gold medal	Bill Mulliken	United States
Silver medal	Kenneth Nakasone	United States
Bronze medal	Manuel Sanguily	Cuba

The men's 200 metre breaststroke competition of the swimming events at the 1959 Pan American Games took place on 31 August (preliminaires) and 2 September (finals). The last Pan American Games champion was Héctor Domínguez of Argentina.

This race consisted of four lengths of the pool, all in breaststroke.

== Results ==
All times are in minutes and seconds.

KEY:	q	Fastest non-qualifiers	Q	Qualified	GR	Games record	NR	National record	PB	Personal best	SB	Seasonal best

=== Heats ===
The first round was held on August 31.

Rank	Heat	Name	Nationality	Time	Notes
1	1	Manuel Sanguily	Cuba	2:44.9	Q, GR
2	2	Kenneth Nakasone	United States	2:45.3	Q
3	1	Bill Mulliken	United States	2:46.5	Q
4	1	Fred Munsch	United States	2:48.5	Q
5	2	Roberto Marmolejo	Mexico	2:51.6	Q
6	2	Ruben Vergos	Mexico	2:52.2	Q
7	2	Farid Zablith Filho	Brazil	2:52.2	Q
8	2	Stephen Rabinovitch	Canada	2:52.5	Q
-	2	Newton de Thuin	Brazil	2:58.5	

=== Final ===
The final was held on September 2.

Rank	Name	Nationality	Time	Notes
1st place, gold medalist(s)	Bill Mulliken	United States	2:43.1	GR
2nd place, silver medalist(s)	Kenneth Nakasone	United States	2:43.2	
3rd place, bronze medalist(s)	Manuel Sanguily	Cuba	2:44.3	
4	Fred Munsch	United States	2:47.7	
5	Steve Rabinovitch	Canada	-	
6	Roberto Marmolejo	Mexico	-	
7	Farid Zablith Filho	Brazil	2:52.6	
8	Ruben Vergos	Mexico	-	
