= Swimming at the 1987 Pan American Games – Men's 50 metre freestyle =

Men's 50 metre freestyle at the 1987 Pan American Games
- Venue: Indiana University Natatorium
- Dates: August 14 (preliminaries and finals)
- Competitors: from - nations

Medalists
Gold medal	Tom Williams	United States
Silver medal	Michael Neuhofel	United States
Bronze medal	Claude Lamy	Canada
Bronze medal	Hilton Woods	Netherlands Antilles

The men's 50 metre freestyle competition of the swimming events at the 1987 Pan American Games took place on 14 August at the Indiana University Natatorium. It was the first appearance of this event in the Pan American Games.

This race consisted of one length of the pool in freestyle.

== Results ==
All times are in minutes and seconds.

KEY:	q	Fastest non-qualifiers	Q	Qualified	GR	Games record	NR	National record	PB	Personal best	SB	Seasonal best

=== Final ===
The final was held on August 14.

Rank	Name	Nationality	Time	Notes
1st place, gold medalist(s)	Tom Williams	United States	22.55	
2nd place, silver medalist(s)	Michael Neuhofel	United States	22.84	
3rd place, bronze medalist(s)	Claude Lamy	Canada	23.39	
3rd place, bronze medalist(s)	Hilton Woods	Netherlands Antilles	23.39	
5	Brad Creelman	Canada	23.98	
6	Fernando Rodríguez	Peru	24.16	
7	Rodrigo González	Mexico	24.27	
8	Jorge Fernandes	Brazil	24.39	
