= Swimming at the 1991 Pan American Games – Women's 400 metre individual medley =

Women's 400 metre individual medley at the 1991 Pan American Games
- Venue: -
- Dates: August 12 (preliminaries and finals)
- Competitors: from - nations

Medalists
| Gold medal | Amy Shaw | United States |
| Silver medal | Joanne Malar | Canada |
| Bronze medal | Brandy Wood | United States |

The women's 400 metre individual medley competition of the swimming events at the 1991 Pan American Games took place on 12 August. The last Pan American Games champion was Tami Bruce of US.

This race consisted of eight lengths of the pool. The first two lengths were swum using the butterfly stroke, the second pair with the backstroke, the third pair of lengths in breaststroke, and the final two were freestyle.

== Results ==
All times are in minutes and seconds.

| KEY: | q | Fastest non-qualifiers | Q | Qualified | GR | Games record | NR | National record | PB | Personal best | SB | Seasonal best |

=== Final ===
The final was held on August 12.

| Rank | Name | Nationality | Time | Notes |
|---|---|---|---|---|
| 1st place, gold medalist(s) | Amy Shaw | United States | 4:50.39 | |
| 2nd place, silver medalist(s) | Joanne Malar | Canada | 4:51.27 | |
| 3rd place, bronze medalist(s) | Brandy Wood | United States | 4:52.38 | |
| 4 | Sheila Hewerdine | Canada | 4:56.00 | |
| 5 | Lorenza Muñoz | Mexico | 4:58.97 | |
| 6 | Sonia Alvarez | Puerto Rico | 5:01.80 | |
| 7 | Daniela Ishimaru | Brazil | 5:03.27 | |
| 8 | Edith Arraspide | Argentina | 5:03.60 | |
