= Swimming at the 1991 Pan American Games – Women's 100 metre backstroke =

Women's 100 metre backstroke at the 1991 Pan American Games
- Venue: -
- Dates: August 14 (preliminaries and finals)
- Competitors: from - nations

Medalists
Gold medal	Silvia Poll	Costa Rica
Silver medal	Nikki Dryden	Canada
Bronze medal	Jodi Wilson	United States

The women's 100 metre backstroke competition of the swimming events at the 1991 Pan American Games took place on 14 August. The last Pan American Games champion was Silvia Poll of Costa Rica.

This race consisted of two lengths of the pool, all in backstroke.

== Results ==
All times are in minutes and seconds.

KEY:	q	Fastest non-qualifiers	Q	Qualified	GR	Games record	NR	National record	PB	Personal best	SB	Seasonal best

=== Final ===
The final was held on August 14.

Rank	Name	Nationality	Time	Notes
1st place, gold medalist(s)	Silvia Poll	Costa Rica	1:03.15	
2nd place, silver medalist(s)	Nikki Dryden	Canada	1:03.64	
3rd place, bronze medalist(s)	Jodi Wilson	United States	1:03.78	
4	Ana Azevedo	Brazil	1:04.96	
5	Beth Hazel	Canada	1:05.53	
6	Veronica Meinhard	Venezuela	1:05.62	
7	Rita Garay	Puerto Rico	1:05.66	
8	Fabíola Molina	Brazil	1:05.82	
