= Farid Zablith Filho =

Brazilian swimmer (born 1942)

Personal information
- Full name: Farid Zablith Filho
- Born: August 5, 1942 (age 83) São Paulo, São Paulo, Brazil
- Height: 1.87 m (6 ft 2 in)

Sport
- Sport: Swimming
- Strokes: Breaststroke
Medal record
Men's swimming
Representing Brazil

Farid Zablith Filho (born August 5, 1942 in São Paulo) is a former Olympic breaststroke swimmer from Brazil, who participated at two Summer Olympics for his native country.

At the 1959 Pan American Games in Chicago, he finished 7th in the 200 metre breaststroke.

At the 1960 Summer Olympics in Rome, he swam the 200-metre breaststroke and the 4×100-metre medley, not reaching the finals.

At the 1963 Pan American Games, in São Paulo, he finished 4th in the 4×100-metre medley, and 5th in the 100-metre breaststroke.

At the 1964 Summer Olympics in Tokyo, he swam the 200-metre breaststroke and the 4×100-metre medley, not reaching the finals.
