= Joann Baker =

Canadian swimmer

Personal information
- Born: 24 November 1960 (age 65) Moose Jaw, Saskatchewan, Canada

Sport
- Sport: Swimming
- Strokes: Breaststroke
Medal record
Representing Canada
Pan American Games
Silver medal – second place	1975 Mexico City	200m breaststroke

Joann Baker (born 24 November 1960) is a Canadian swimmer. She competed in three events at the 1976 Summer Olympics.
