= Swimming at the 1983 Pan American Games – Women's 100 metre backstroke =

Women's 100 metre backstroke at the 1983 Pan American Games
- Venue: -
- Dates: August 19 (preliminaries and finals)
- Competitors: from - nations

Medalists
| Gold medal | Susan Walsh | United States |
| Silver medal | Joan Pennington | United States |
| Bronze medal | Barbara McBain | Canada |

The women's 100 metre backstroke competition of the swimming events at the 1983 Pan American Games took place on 19 August. The last Pan American Games champion was Linda Jezek of US.

This race consisted of two lengths of the pool, all in backstroke.

== Results ==
All times are in minutes and seconds.

| KEY: | q | Fastest non-qualifiers | Q | Qualified | GR | Games record | NR | National record | PB | Personal best | SB | Seasonal best |

=== Final ===
The final was held on August 19.

| Rank | Name | Nationality | Time | Notes |
|---|---|---|---|---|
| 1st place, gold medalist(s) | Susan Walsh | United States | 1:02.48 | NR, GR |
| 2nd place, silver medalist(s) | Joan Pennington | United States | 1:03.63 | |
| 3rd place, bronze medalist(s) | Barbara McBain | Canada | 1:05.38 | |
| 4 | Michelle MacPherson | Canada | 1:06.09 | |
| 5 | Karen Brands | Peru | 1:07.69 | NR |
| 6 | Sandra Barbato | Uruguay | 1:08.50 | |
| 7 | Shelley Cramer | U.S. Virgin Islands | 1:08.59 | |
| 8 | Fernanda Santos | Brazil | 1:10.66 | |
