= Swimming at the 1991 Pan American Games – Women's 200 metre butterfly =

Women's 200 metre butterfly at the 1991 Pan American Games
- Venue: -
- Dates: August 18 (preliminaries and finals)
- Competitors: from - nations

Medalists
Gold medal	Susan Gottlieb	United States
Silver medal	Angie Wester-Krieg	United States
Bronze medal	Beth Hazel	Canada

The women's 200 metre butterfly competition of the swimming events at the 1991 Pan American Games took place on 18 August. The last Pan American Games champion was Kara McGrath of US.

This race consisted of four lengths of the pool, all lengths being in butterfly stroke.

== Results ==
All times are in minutes and seconds.

KEY:	q	Fastest non-qualifiers	Q	Qualified	GR	Games record	NR	National record	PB	Personal best	SB	Seasonal best

=== Final ===
The final was held on August 18.

Rank	Name	Nationality	Time	Notes
1st place, gold medalist(s)	Susan Gottlieb	United States	2:12.35	
2nd place, silver medalist(s)	Angie Wester-Krieg	United States	2:14.55	
3rd place, bronze medalist(s)	Beth Hazel	Canada	2:14.91	
4	Beth Hollihan	Canada	2:17.25	
5	Niuvis Rosales	Cuba	2:18.38	
6	Edith Arraspide	Argentina	2:19.97	
7	Viviane Sanchez	Mexico	2:22.09	
8	Angela Tupynambá	Brazil	2:23.80	
