= Swimming at the 1987 Pan American Games – Men's 4 × 100 metre medley relay =

Men's 4 × 100 metre medley relay at the 1987 Pan American Games
- Venue: Indiana University Natatorium
- Dates: August 15 (preliminaries and finals)
- Competitors: from - nations

Medalists
| Gold medal | Andrew Gill, Richard Korhammer, Wade King and Todd Dudley | United States |
| Silver medal | -, -, - and - | Canada |
| Bronze medal | Jorge Fernandes, Otávio Silva, Cícero Tortelli and Ricardo Prado | Brazil |

The men's 4 × 100 metre medley relay competition of the swimming events at the 1987 Pan American Games took place on 15 August at the Indiana University Natatorium. The last Pan American Games champion was the United States.

== Results ==
All times are in minutes and seconds.

| KEY: | q | Fastest non-qualifiers | Q | Qualified | GR | Games record | NR | National record | PB | Personal best | SB | Seasonal best |

=== Final ===
The final was held on August 15.

| Rank | Name | Nationality | Time | Notes |
|---|---|---|---|---|
| 1st place, gold medalist(s) | Andrew Gill (56.59); Richard Korhammer (1:02.36); Wade King (54.68); Todd Dudley (50.02) | United States | 3:43.65 | |
| 2nd place, silver medalist(s) | - - - - | Canada | 3:49.77 | |
| 3rd place, bronze medalist(s) | Jorge Fernandes; Otávio Silva; Cícero Tortelli; Ricardo Prado | Brazil | 3:50.29 | |
| 4 | - - - - | Cuba | 3:55.93 | |
| 5 | - - - - | Puerto Rico | 4:01.92 | |
| 6 | - - - - | Argentina | 4:03.06 | |
| 7 | - - - - | Panama | 4:06.64 | |
| 8 | - - - - | U.S. Virgin Islands | 4:20.21 | |
