= Swimming at the 1987 Pan American Games – Women's 100 metre backstroke =

Women's 100 metre backstroke at the 1987 Pan American Games
- Venue: Indiana University Natatorium
- Dates: August 11 (preliminaries and finals)
- Competitors: from - nations

Medalists
Gold medal	Silvia Poll	Costa Rica
Silver medal	Holly Green	United States
Bronze medal	Michelle Donahue	United States

The women's 100 metre backstroke competition of the swimming events at the 1987 Pan American Games took place on 11 August at the Indiana University Natatorium. The last Pan American Games champion was Susan Walsh of US.

This race consisted of two lengths of the pool, all in backstroke.

== Results ==
All times are in minutes and seconds.

KEY:	q	Fastest non-qualifiers	Q	Qualified	GR	Games record	NR	National record	PB	Personal best	SB	Seasonal best

=== Final ===
The final was held on August 11.

Rank	Name	Nationality	Time	Notes
1st place, gold medalist(s)	Silvia Poll	Costa Rica	1:02.18	NR, GR
2nd place, silver medalist(s)	Holly Green	United States	1:03.15	
3rd place, bronze medalist(s)	Michelle Donahue	United States	1:03.30	
4	Manon Simard	Canada	1:04.72	
5	Cristiane Santos	Brazil	1:06.89	
6	Teresa Rivera	Mexico	1:07.88	
7	Beatriz Villa	Colombia	1:08.68	
8	Leticia Morales	Argentina	1:09.04	
