= Andrea Moody =

Canadian swimmer

Personal information
- National team: Canada
- Born: February 20, 1978 (age 48) Abbotsford, British Columbia
- Height: 178 cm (5 ft 10 in)
- Weight: 68 kg (150 lb)

Sport
- Sport: Swimming
- Strokes: Freestyle
- Club: West Vancouver Otters
Medal record
Women's swimming
Representing Canada
Pan American Games
Silver medal – second place	1995 Mar del Plata	4x100 m freestyle
Bronze medal – third place	1995 Mar del Plata	50 m freestyle

Andrea Moody (born February 20, 1978) is a former freestyle swimmer from Canada, who competed at the 1996 Summer Olympics for her native country. She finished in seventh place with the women's 4×100-metre freestyle relay team, swimming the third leg, alongside Shannon Shakespeare, Julie Howard and Marianne Limpert. Moody was coached by Sam Montgomery.
