= Swimming at the 1971 Pan American Games – Women's 100 metre backstroke =

Women's 100 metre backstroke at the 1971 Pan American Games
- Venue: -
- Dates: August 7 (preliminaries and finals)
- Competitors: from - nations

Medalists
Gold medal	Donna Gurr	Canada
Silver medal	Susie Atwood	United States
Bronze medal	Jill Hlay	United States

The women's 100 metre backstroke competition of the swimming events at the 1971 Pan American Games took place on 7 August. The last Pan American Games champion was Elaine Tanner of Canada.

This race consisted of two lengths of the pool, all in backstroke.

== Results ==
All times are in minutes and seconds.

KEY:	q	Fastest non-qualifiers	Q	Qualified	GR	Games record	NR	National record	PB	Personal best	SB	Seasonal best

=== Final ===
The final was held on August 7.

Rank	Name	Nationality	Time	Notes
1st place, gold medalist(s)	Donna Gurr	Canada	1:07.2	GR
2nd place, silver medalist(s)	Susie Atwood	United States	1:07.5	
3rd place, bronze medalist(s)	Jill Hlay	United States	1:08.5	
4	Leslie Cliff	Canada	1:09.5	
5	Maria Teresa Ramírez	Mexico	1:11.1	NR
6	Adriana Grehnikoff	Argentina	1:13.3	
7	Liana Vicens	Puerto Rico	1:15.0	
8	Lucila Martins	Brazil	1:15.1	
