= Mark Andrews (swimmer) =

Canadian swimmer (born 1965)

Personal information
- Full name: Mark Andrews
- National team: Trinidad and Tobago; Canada
- Born: August 9, 1965 (age 60) Toronto, Ontario
- Height: 1.85 m (6 ft 1 in)
- Weight: 75 kg (165 lb)

Sport
- Sport: Swimming
- Strokes: Freestyle
- College team: University of Calgary; Louisiana State University
Medal record
Men's swimming
Representing Trinidad and Tobago
Pan American Games
Bronze medal – third place	1987 Indianapolis	100 m freestyle

Mark Andrews (born August 9, 1965) is a former competitive freestyle swimmer from Canada, who competed for his native country at the 1988 Summer Olympics in Seoul, South Korea.

In Seoul, Andrews finished in 15th position in the 50-metre freestyle, and in ninth place with the men's 4x100-metre freestyle relay team. He also swam for Trinidad in the 1987 Pan American Games and won a bronze medal in the 100-metre freestyle, and took the NCAA Freestyle title for Louisiana State University in 1988. His fastest 50-yard freestyle was 19.57 seconds.
