= Swimming at the 2007 Pan American Games – Men's 400 metre freestyle =

The Men's 400m Freestyle event at the 2007 Pan American Games occurred at the Maria Lenk Aquatic Park in Rio de Janeiro, Brazil on 17 and 18 July. A total of 17 swimmers initially swam the race.

== Medalists ==
Gold	Matt Patton; United States
Silver	Tobias Work; United States
Bronze	Armando Negreiros; Brazil

== Results ==
Rank	Swimmer	Semifinals		Final
Rank	Swimmer	Time	Rank	Time
1	Matt Patton (USA)	3:53.30	3	3:49.77
2	Tobias Work (USA)	3:51.32	1	3:50.62
3	Armando Negreiros (BRA)	3:51.47	2	3:51.18
4	Felipe Araujo (BRA)	3:57.34	5	3:55.93
5	Kler Maitland (CAN)	3:57.64	6	3:57.51
6	Iván López (MEX)	3:57.25	4	3:59.53
7	Daniel Delgadillo (MEX)	4:00.36	8	3:59.66
8	Juan Pereyra (ARG)	3:59.97	7	4:02.91
9	Gian Carlo Zolezzi (CHI)	4:00.37		
10	Alejandro Gómez (VEN)	4:00.76		
11	Erwin Maldonado (VEN)	4:01.63		
12	Oscar Jahnsen (PER)	4:02.01		
13	Salvador Mallat (CHI)	4:02.37		
14	Evan Marcus (GUA)	4:06.37		
15	Daniel Quiepo (URU)	4:07.14		
16	Mario Montoya (CRC)	4:07.47		
17	Micky van der Vaart (ARU)	4:12.68		
