= Swimming at the 1955 Pan American Games – Women's 4 × 100 metre freestyle relay =

Women's 4 × 100 metre freestyle relay at the 1955 Pan American Games
- Venue: -
- Dates: March 24 (preliminaries and finals)

Medalists
Gold medal	Wanda Werner, Carolyn Green, Gretchen Kluter and Judith Roberts	United States
Silver medal	-	Canada
Bronze medal	-	Argentina

The women's 4 × 100 metre freestyle relay competition of the swimming events at the 1955 Pan American Games took place on 24 March. The defending Pan American Games champion is the United States.

This race consisted of eight lengths of the pool. Each of the four swimmers completed two lengths of the pool. The first swimmer had to touch the wall before the second could leave the starting block.

== Results ==
All times are in minutes and seconds.

KEY:	q	Fastest non-qualifiers	Q	Qualified	GR	Games record	NR	National record	PB	Personal best	SB	Seasonal best

=== Final ===
The final was held on March 24.

Rank	Name	Nationality	Time	Notes
1st place, gold medalist(s)	Wanda Werner; Carolyn Green; Gretchen Kluter; Judith Roberts	United States	4:31.8	GR
2nd place, silver medalist(s)	- - - -	Canada	4:38.1	
3rd place, bronze medalist(s)	- - - -	Argentina	4:43.7	
4	- - - -	Mexico	4:48.8	
5	- - - -	-	-	
6	- - - -	-	-	
7	- - - -	-	-	
8	- - - -	-	-	
