= Sylvia Dockerill =

Canadian swimmer (born 1951)

Personal information
- Born: 17 September 1951 (age 74) Vancouver, British Columbia, Canada

Sport
- Sport: Swimming
- Strokes: Breaststroke
Medal record
Women's swimming
Representing Canada
British Commonwealth Games
Bronze medal – third place	1970 Edinburgh	4×100 m medley
Pan American Games
Gold medal – first place	1971 Cali	100 m breaststroke

Sylvia Dockerill (born 17 September 1951) is a Canadian former breaststroke swimmer. She competed in two events at the 1972 Summer Olympics.
