= Swimming at the 1955 Pan American Games – Men's 1500 metre freestyle =

Men's 1500 metre freestyle at the 1955 Pan American Games
- Venue: -
- Dates: March 20 (preliminaries and finals)

Medalists
Gold medal	Jimmy McLane	United States
Silver medal	Oscar Kramer	Argentina
Bronze medal	Gilberto Martínez	Colombia

The men's 1500 metre freestyle competition of the swimming events at the 1955 Pan American Games took place on 20 March. The last Pan American Games champion was Tetsuo Okamoto of Brazil.

This race consisted of thirty lengths of the pool, all lengths being in freestyle.

== Results ==
All times are in minutes and seconds.

KEY:	q	Fastest non-qualifiers	Q	Qualified	GR	Games record	NR	National record	PB	Personal best	SB	Seasonal best

=== Final ===
The final was held on March 20.

Rank	Name	Nationality	Time	Notes
1st place, gold medalist(s)	Jimmy McLane	United States	20:04.0	
2nd place, silver medalist(s)	Oscar Kramer	Argentina	20:09.9	
3rd place, bronze medalist(s)	Gilberto Martínez	Colombia	20:37.2	
4	Jorge Vogt	Argentina	20:41.1	
5	Sílvio Kelly dos Santos	Brazil	20:48.2	
6	William Yorzyk	United States	20:50.2	
7	-	-	-	
8	Wayne Moore	United States	21:04.0	
