= Swimming at the 1987 Pan American Games – Women's 400 metre freestyle =

Women's 400 metre freestyle at the 1987 Pan American Games
- Venue: Indiana University Natatorium
- Dates: August 11 (preliminaries and finals)
- Competitors: from - nations

Medalists
Gold medal	Julie Martin	United States
Silver medal	Barbara Metz	United States
Bronze medal	Megan Holliday	Canada

The women's 400 metre freestyle competition of the swimming events at the 1987 Pan American Games took place on 11 August at the Indiana University Natatorium. The last Pan American Games champion was Tiffany Cohen of US.

This race consisted of eight lengths of the pool, with all eight being in the freestyle stroke.

== Results ==
All times are in minutes and seconds.

KEY:	q	Fastest non-qualifiers	Q	Qualified	GR	Games record	NR	National record	PB	Personal best	SB	Seasonal best

=== Final ===
The final was held on August 11.

Rank	Name	Nationality	Time	Notes
1st place, gold medalist(s)	Julie Martin	United States	4:11.87	
2nd place, silver medalist(s)	Barbara Metz	United States	4:13.25	
3rd place, bronze medalist(s)	Megan Holliday	Canada	4:20.78	
4	Jolene Cowan	Canada	4:21.75	
5	Patrícia Amorim	Brazil	4:21.99	
6	Miriam Artur	Brazil	4:30.63	
7	Brendali Sierra	Puerto Rico	4:31.28	
8	Sandra Bohorquez	Colombia	4:37.48	
