= Swimming at the 1987 Pan American Games – Women's 400 metre individual medley =

Women's 400 metre individual medley at the 1987 Pan American Games
- Venue: Indiana University Natatorium
- Dates: August 9 (preliminaries and finals)
- Competitors: from - nations

Medalists
Gold medal	Tami Bruce	United States
Silver medal	Katie Welch	United States
Bronze medal	Karin Helmstaedt	Canada

The women's 400 metre individual medley competition of the swimming events at the 1987 Pan American Games took place on 9 August at the Indiana University Natatorium. The last Pan American Games champion was Tracy Caulkins of US.

This race consisted of eight lengths of the pool. The first two lengths were swum using the butterfly stroke, the second pair with the backstroke, the third pair of lengths in breaststroke, and the final two were freestyle.

== Results ==
All times are in minutes and seconds.

KEY:	q	Fastest non-qualifiers	Q	Qualified	GR	Games record	NR	National record	PB	Personal best	SB	Seasonal best

=== Final ===
The final was held on August 9.

Rank	Name	Nationality	Time	Notes
1st place, gold medalist(s)	Tami Bruce	United States	4:49.34	
2nd place, silver medalist(s)	Katie Welch	United States	4:51.32	
3rd place, bronze medalist(s)	Karin Helmstaedt	Canada	4:57.04	
4	Valentina Aracil	Argentina	5:03.55	
5	Marlene Bruten	Mexico	5:08.30	
6	Rachel Brinn	Jamaica	5:13.78	
7	Cláudia Sprengel	Brazil	5:15.35	
8	-	-	-	
