= Swimming at the 1983 Pan American Games – Men's 100 metre butterfly =

Men's 100 metre butterfly at the 1983 Pan American Games
- Venue: -
- Dates: August 18 (preliminaries and finals)
- Competitors: from - nations

Medalists
Gold medal	Matt Gribble	United States
Silver medal	Pablo Morales	United States
Bronze medal	Rafael Vidal	Venezuela

The men's 100 metre butterfly competition of the swimming events at the 1983 Pan American Games took place on 18 August. The last Pan American Games champion was Robert Placak of US.

This race consisted of two lengths of the pool, all in butterfly.

== Results ==
All times are in minutes and seconds.

KEY:	q	Fastest non-qualifiers	Q	Qualified	GR	Games record	NR	National record	PB	Personal best	SB	Seasonal best

=== Final ===
The finals was held on August 18, 1983.

Rank	Name	Nationality	Time	Notes
1st place, gold medalist(s)	Matt Gribble	United States	54.25	GR
2nd place, silver medalist(s)	Pablo Morales	United States	54.62	
3rd place, bronze medalist(s)	Rafael Vidal	Venezuela	54.72	SA
4	Tom Ponting	Canada	55.18	
5	Filiberto Colon	Puerto Rico	56.45	
6	Dave Churchill	Canada	56.88	
7	Marcelo Jucá	Brazil	57.32	
8	Ivan Ortiz	Puerto Rico	58.31	
