= Swimming at the 1987 Pan American Games – Men's 1500 metre freestyle =

Men's 1500 metre freestyle at the 1987 Pan American Games
- Venue: Indiana University Natatorium
- Dates: August 15 (preliminaries and finals)
- Competitors: from - nations

Medalists
Gold medal	Alex Kostich	United States
Silver medal	Lars Jorgensen	United States
Bronze medal	Chris Chalmers	Canada

The men's 1500 metre freestyle competition of the swimming events at the 1987 Pan American Games took place on 15 August at the Indiana University Natatorium. The last Pan American Games champion was Jeff Kostoff of US.

This race consisted of thirty lengths of the pool, all lengths being in freestyle.

== Results ==
All times are in minutes and seconds.

KEY:	q	Fastest non-qualifiers	Q	Qualified	GR	Games record	NR	National record	PB	Personal best	SB	Seasonal best

=== Final ===
The final was held on August 15.

Rank	Name	Nationality	Time	Notes
1st place, gold medalist(s)	Alex Kostich	United States	15:20.90	GR
2nd place, silver medalist(s)	Lars Jorgensen	United States	15:24.09	
3rd place, bronze medalist(s)	Chris Chalmers	Canada	15:30.51	
4	Cristiano Michelena	Brazil	15:52.53	
5	Luis Moreli	Puerto Rico	15:56.96	
6	Pedro Carrío	Cuba	16:03.12	
7	Raul Calmet	Peru	16:04.22	
8	José Vazquez	Puerto Rico	16:07.24	
