= Guylaine Cloutier =

Canadian swimmer (born 1971)

Personal information
- Full name: Guylaine Cloutier
- National team: Canada
- Born: October 1, 1971 (age 54) Lévis, Quebec
- Height: 1.65 m (5 ft 5 in)
- Weight: 53 kg (117 lb)

Sport
- Sport: Swimming
- Strokes: Breaststroke
- Club: Club Aquatique Montréal Olympique
Medal record
Women's swimming
Representing Canada
Pan Pacific Championships
Silver medal – second place	1987 Brisbane	100m breaststroke
Silver medal – second place	1995 Atlanta	100m breaststroke
Bronze medal – third place	1985 Tokyo	200m breaststroke
Bronze medal – third place	1993 Kobe	100m breaststroke
Pan American Games
Silver medal – second place	1995 Mar del Plata	100m breaststroke
Silver medal – second place	1995 Mar del Plata	200m breaststroke
Summer Universiade
Gold medal – first place	1991 Sheffield	100m breaststroke
Gold medal – first place	1993 Buffalo	100m breaststroke
Bronze medal – third place	1993 Buffalo	200m breaststroke

Guylaine Cloutier (born October 1, 1971) is a former competition swimmer from Canada, who was a breaststroke specialist. Cloutier competed internationally at three consecutive Summer Olympics, starting in 1988. Her best Olympic finish was fourth place in the 100-metre breaststroke at the 1992 Summer Olympics in Barcelona, Spain.
