= María Carolina Santa Cruz =

Argentine swimmer

Personal information
- Born: 22 August 1978 (age 47)

Sport
- Sport: Swimming

María Carolina Santa Cruz (born 22 August 1978) is an Argentine swimmer. She competed in three events at the 1996 Summer Olympics.
