= Swimming at the 1967 Pan American Games – Women's 200 metre backstroke =

Women's 200 metre backstroke at the 1967 Pan American Games
- Venue: Pan Am Pool
- Dates: July 26 (preliminaries and finals)
- Competitors: from - nations

Medalists
Gold medal	Elaine Tanner	Canada
Silver medal	Kendis Moore	United States
Bronze medal	Cathy Ferguson	United States

The women's 200 metre backstroke competition of the swimming events at the 1967 Pan American Games took place on 26 July at the Pan Am Pool. It was the first appearance of this event in the Pan American Games.

This race consisted of four lengths of the pool, all in backstroke.

== Results ==
All times are in minutes and seconds.

KEY:	q	Fastest non-qualifiers	Q	Qualified	GR	Games record	NR	National record	PB	Personal best	SB	Seasonal best

=== Final ===
The final was held on July 26.

Rank	Name	Nationality	Time	Notes
1st place, gold medalist(s)	Elaine Tanner	Canada	2:24.44	WR
2nd place, silver medalist(s)	Kendis Moore	United States	2:30.38	
3rd place, bronze medalist(s)	Cathy Ferguson	United States	2:32.48	
4	Jeanne Warren	Canada	2:35.33	
5	-	-	-	
6	-	-	-	
7	-	-	-	
8	-	-	-	
