= Swimming at the 1955 Pan American Games – Women's 200 metre breaststroke =

Women's 200 metre breaststroke at the 1955 Pan American Games
- Venue: -
- Dates: March 24 (preliminaries and finals)

Medalists
Gold medal	Mary Lou Elsenius	United States
Silver medal	Mary Jane Sears	United States
Bronze medal	Beatriz Rohde	Argentina

The women's 200 metre breaststroke competition of the swimming events at the 1955 Pan American Games took place on 24 March. The last Pan American Games champion was Dorotea Turnbull of Argentina.

This race consisted of four lengths of the pool, all in breaststroke.

== Results ==
All times are in minutes and seconds.

KEY:	q	Fastest non-qualifiers	Q	Qualified	GR	Games record	NR	National record	PB	Personal best	SB	Seasonal best

=== Final ===
The final was held on March 24.

Rank	Name	Nationality	Time	Notes
1st place, gold medalist(s)	Mary Lou Elsenius	United States	3:08.4	
2nd place, silver medalist(s)	Mary Jane Sears	United States	3:09.0	
3rd place, bronze medalist(s)	Beatriz Rohde	Argentina	3:09.4	
4	Mary Gillett	United States	3:19.9	
5	Irma Schluter	Mexico	3:21.5	
6	Wanda Castro	Brazil	3:21.6	
7	Adriana Hernández	Mexico	3:23.0	
8	Helen Stewart	Canada	3:24.8	
