= Swimming at the 1983 Pan American Games – Men's 4 × 100 metre medley relay =

Men's 4 × 100 metre medley relay at the 1983 Pan American Games
- Venue: -
- Dates: August 22 (preliminaries and finals)
- Competitors: from - nations

Medalists
Gold medal	Rick Carey, Steve Lundquist, Matt Gribble and Rowdy Gaines	United States
Silver medal	-,-,-,-	Canada
Bronze medal	-,-,-,-	Venezuela

The men's 4 × 100 metre medley relay competition of the swimming events at the 1983 Pan American Games took place on 22 August. The last Pan American Games champion was the United States.

== Results ==
All times are in minutes and seconds.

KEY:	q	Fastest non-qualifiers	Q	Qualified	GR	Games record	NR	National record	PB	Personal best	SB	Seasonal best

=== Final ===
The final was held on August 22.

Rank	Name	Nationality	Time	Notes
1st place, gold medalist(s)	Rick Carey (55.60); Steve Lundquist (1:02.01); Matt Gribble (53.47); Rowdy Gaines (49.34)	United States	3:40.42	WR
2nd place, silver medalist(s)	- - - -	Canada	3:48.10	
3rd place, bronze medalist(s)	- - - -	Venezuela	3:50.52	SA, AR
4	- - - -	Brazil	3:52.15	NR
5	- - - -	Cuba	4:04.12	
6	- - - -	Suriname	4:16.62	
7	- - - -	Argentina	DQ	
8	- - - -	-	-	
