= Michelle Griglione =

American swimmer (born June, 12, 1969)

Personal information
- Full name: Michelle Griglione
- National team: United States
- Born: June 12, 1969 (age 57) Alexandria, Virginia, U.S.
- Education: Stanford University (Chem E. 1991); University of Florida (Phd.)
- Occupation: Chemical Engineer
- Spouse: Robert Baker
- Children: At least 1, daughter

Sport
- Sport: Swimming
- Event: 200, 400 IM
- Strokes: Butterfly, Individual Medley
- Club: Alexandria YMCA; Brookville Swim Club; Lake Barcroft Swim Club
- College team: Stanford University
- Coach: John Flanagan (From ages 12-18); George Haines (Stanford); Richard Quick (Stanford); Rick Curl (Curl-Burke SC)
Medal record
Women's swimming
Representing the United States
World Championships
Silver medal – second place	1986 Madrid	400 m medley
Pan Pacific Swimming Championships
Silver medal – second place	1985 Tokyo	200 m medley
Silver medal – second place	1985 Tokyo	400 m medley
Bronze medal – third place	1989 Tokyo	200 m medley
Pan American Games
Silver medal – second place	1987 Indianapolis	200 m butterfly
Silver medal – second place	1995 Mar del Plata	200 m butterfly

Michelle Griglione (June 12, 1969), also known by her married name Michelle Baker, is an American former competitive swimmer who competed for Stanford University, and won a silver medal in the 400-meter individual medley event at the 1986 World Aquatics Championships in Madrid, Spain. She barely missed Olympic qualifications in 1984, 1988, 1992, and 1996, finishing her Olympic trial final events in third and fourth place, just one or two places short of being selected for the team. An exceptionally strong achiever on the international stage, between 1985-1996 she won a total of five silver medals and a bronze in the World Aquatics Championships, Pan Pacific Championships, Pan American Games, and Goodwill Games.

== Early life ==
Griglione was born in Alexandria, Virginia on June 12, 1969, to John and Caroline Griglione, and studied at T.C. Williams High School where she graduated in June, 1986. From an athletic family, her father, John, was an All-America football player at Iowa State. She began swimming around the age of six and trained initially with the local Alexandria area YMCA Club team. Through the age of 13, she trained with the Brookville Swim Club and later Lake Barcroft's swim club. After age 12, she was coached largely by John Flanagan, who remained as a coach until she started at Stanford. She had to confine her competition to club teams, as she could not swim for her High School T.C. Williams until she was a Senior, as their team was founded that year. On the T.C. Williams team, she swam under Coach Tinker Hawthorne, but was the only strong performer on the losing team, though fondly remembered the time spent with fellow students.

In high school competition, she held a regional record in the 200 Individual Medley with a time of 2:02.17. A top national recruit in swimming, in her High School Senior year at the March, 1986 short course U.S. Philips 66 Swimming and Diving National Championships, in the 200-yard butterfly she swam a 1:56.86, in the 200 IM swam a 1:59.98, and in the 400 Individual Medley swam a 4:12.95. Each of her times were under the record times for Stanford University and were personal bests. In 1985, she was ranked second globally in the 200-meter Individual Medley, and second globally in the 400 Individual Medley.

== Stanford University ==
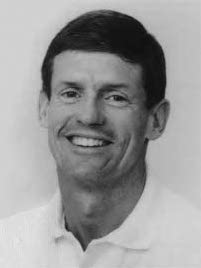
Stanford Coach Quick, 1988

In college she attended Stanford University on a full scholarship from 1986-1991, where she swam for Hall of Fame Head Coaches George Haines first and then Richard Quick. In her Stanford Sophomore season from 1988-1989, in the 400-yard Individual medley event, she won both the Pacific Coast (PAC-10) Conference with a time of 4:18.1 and the NCAA National Conference Championships with a time of 4:12.29. In 1988-89, in her favorite memory of college, she helped lead the team to Richard Quick's first NCAA Division I National Championship win as a Stanford Coach. Well accustomed to national attention, Quick had previously enjoyed four NCAA championships as Coach for the University of Texas. Continuing to gain national recognition, the Stanford Cardinal women's swim team placed second at the NCAA National Championships in Griglione's last two years with the team. After college she swam briefly for Rick Curl of the Curl-Burke Swim Club in Northern Virginia.

As listed in more detail in the Medal Record section of her information box at right, she was a preformerı during international events. Between 1985-1996 she won a total of five silver medals and a bronze in the World Aquatics Championships, Pan Pacific Championships, Pan American Games, and Goodwill Games.

Griglione retired from competitve swimming by the early to mid 1990's. She later competed with the Central Florida Masters, focusing on short butterfly and freestyle events through 2012.

== Education and careers ==
In educational pursuits, she graduated in 1991 with a Chemical Engineering degree from Stanford, then obtained a PHd. in Chemical Engineering from the University of Florida. Putting her education to use, for five years, she performed computer simulations at Agere Systems. While at the University of Florida, she reunited with Robert Baker, whom she had known since High School, and the couple later married. Robert had rowed competitively in High School and later for Northeastern University in Boston. Baker, and Griglione had a daughter, Penelope in 2003. The family resided in Orlando.

== Honors ==
As noted below, in her 1988-89 Sophomore season at Stanford, she was named a PAC-12 (Pac 10 then) co-swimmer of the year, partly for winning the conference title and the NCAA title in the 400 meter IM.

== See also ==
- List of World Aquatics Championships medalists in swimming (women)
