= Swimming at the 1983 Pan American Games – Women's 100 metre butterfly =

Women's 100 metre butterfly at the 1983 Pan American Games
- Venue: -
- Dates: August 20 (preliminaries and finals)
- Competitors: from - nations

Medalists
Gold medal	Laurie Lehner	United States
Silver medal	Michelle MacPherson	Canada
Bronze medal	Patty King	United States

The women's 100 metre butterfly competition of the swimming events at the 1983 Pan American Games took place on 20 August. The last Pan American Games champion was Jill Sterkel of US.

This race consisted of two lengths of the pool, all in butterfly.

== Results ==
All times are in minutes and seconds.

KEY:	q	Fastest non-qualifiers	Q	Qualified	GR	Games record	NR	National record	PB	Personal best	SB	Seasonal best

=== Final ===
The final was held on August 20.

Rank	Name	Nationality	Time	Notes
1st place, gold medalist(s)	Laurie Lehner	United States	1:01.14	
2nd place, silver medalist(s)	Michelle MacPherson	Canada	1:01.63	
3rd place, bronze medalist(s)	Patty King	United States	1:01.96	
4	Marie Moore	Canada	1:03.32	
5	Jodie Lawaetz	U.S. Virgin Islands	1:05.05	
6	Shelley Cramer	U.S. Virgin Islands	1:05.27	
7	Sandra Revette	Venezuela	1:05.34	
8	Rosemary Ribeiro	Brazil	1:06.20	
