= Paul Newallo =

Trinidad and Tobago swimmer (born 1963)

Personal information
- Full name: Paul Newallo
- Nationality: Trinidadian and Tobagonian
- Born: 30 June 1963 (age 63) Trinidad
- Height: 180 cm (5 ft 11 in)
- Weight: 80 kg (176 lb)

Sport
- Sport: Swimming
- Strokes: Breaststroke

Paul Newallo (born 30 June 1963) is a Trinidad and Tobago swimmer. He competed in two events at the 1984 Summer Olympics.
