= Anne Warner (swimmer) =

American swimmer (born 1945)

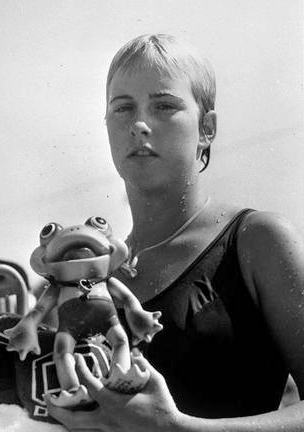
- Warner at the 1960 Olympics

Personal information
- Full name: Anne Kindel Warner
- National team: United States
- Born: January 7, 1945 (age 81) San Mateo, California, U.S.
- Height: 5 ft 7 in (1.70 m)
- Weight: 139 lb (63 kg)

Sport
- Sport: Swimming
- Strokes: Breaststroke
- Club: Santa Clara Swim Club
Medal record
Representing United States
Pan American Games
Gold medal – first place	1959 Chicago	200 m breaststroke

Anne Kindel Warner (born January 6, 1945), also known by her married name Anne Cribbs, is a retired American breaststroke swimmer who won a gold medal over 200 m at the 1959 Pan American Games. She placed sixth in this event at the 1960 Olympics, and also swam for the gold medal-winning U.S. team in the qualifying heats of the 4×100-meter medley relay. She did not receive a medal because only those relay swimmers who competed in the event final were medal-eligible under the 1960 Olympic rules.

In 1996 Anne was a co-founder of the American Basketball League, often abbreviated to the ABL. It was the first independent professional basketball league for women in the United States.

In November 2015, Warner received the Athletes in Excellence Award from The Foundation for Global Sports Development, in recognition of her community service efforts and work with youth.

== Ethics investigation ==
Warner was disqualified from holding office in the U.S. Olympian and Paralympian Association after an ethnics investigation by the U.S. Olympic and Paralympic Committee found she misrepresented herself as a gold medalist in an interview.

She was also forced to resign as chair of USA Table Tennis after an investigation found she had not disclosed conflicts of interest and manipulated meeting agendas. Warner and the entire USA Table Tennis board were forced to resign or risk being stripped of its national governing body status by the association.

== Life after Olympics ==
Warner ran unsuccessfully for Palo Alto City Council in 2024 on a platform focused on improving local sport programs and building more housing.She lost with only 7% of the vote.
