= Swimming at the 1955 Pan American Games – Men's 200 metre breaststroke =

Men's 200 metre breaststroke at the 1955 Pan American Games
- Venue: -
- Dates: March 20 (preliminaries and finals)

Medalists
Gold medal	Héctor Domínguez	Argentina
Silver medal	Manuel Sanguily	Cuba
Bronze medal	Walter Ocampo	Mexico

The men's 200 metre breaststroke competition of the swimming events at the 1955 Pan American Games took place on 20 March. The last Pan American Games champion was Héctor Domínguez of Argentina.

This race consisted of four lengths of the pool, all in breaststroke.

== Results ==
All times are in minutes and seconds.

KEY:	q	Fastest non-qualifiers	Q	Qualified	GR	Games record	NR	National record	PB	Personal best	SB	Seasonal best

=== Final ===
The final was held on March 20.

Rank	Name	Nationality	Time	Notes
1st place, gold medalist(s)	Héctor Domínguez	Argentina	2:46.9	
2nd place, silver medalist(s)	Manuel Sanguily	Cuba	2:47.3	
3rd place, bronze medalist(s)	Walter Ocampo	Mexico	2:50.7	
4	Nélson Ferreira	Brazil	2:55.3	
5	José Hernández	Mexico	2:55.6	
6	Ronald Johnson	United States	3:00.8	
7	Carlos Bacellar	Brazil	3:03.6	
8	Richard Fadgen	United States	3:13.5	
