= Fernanda Santos =

Brazilian-American writer (born 1973)

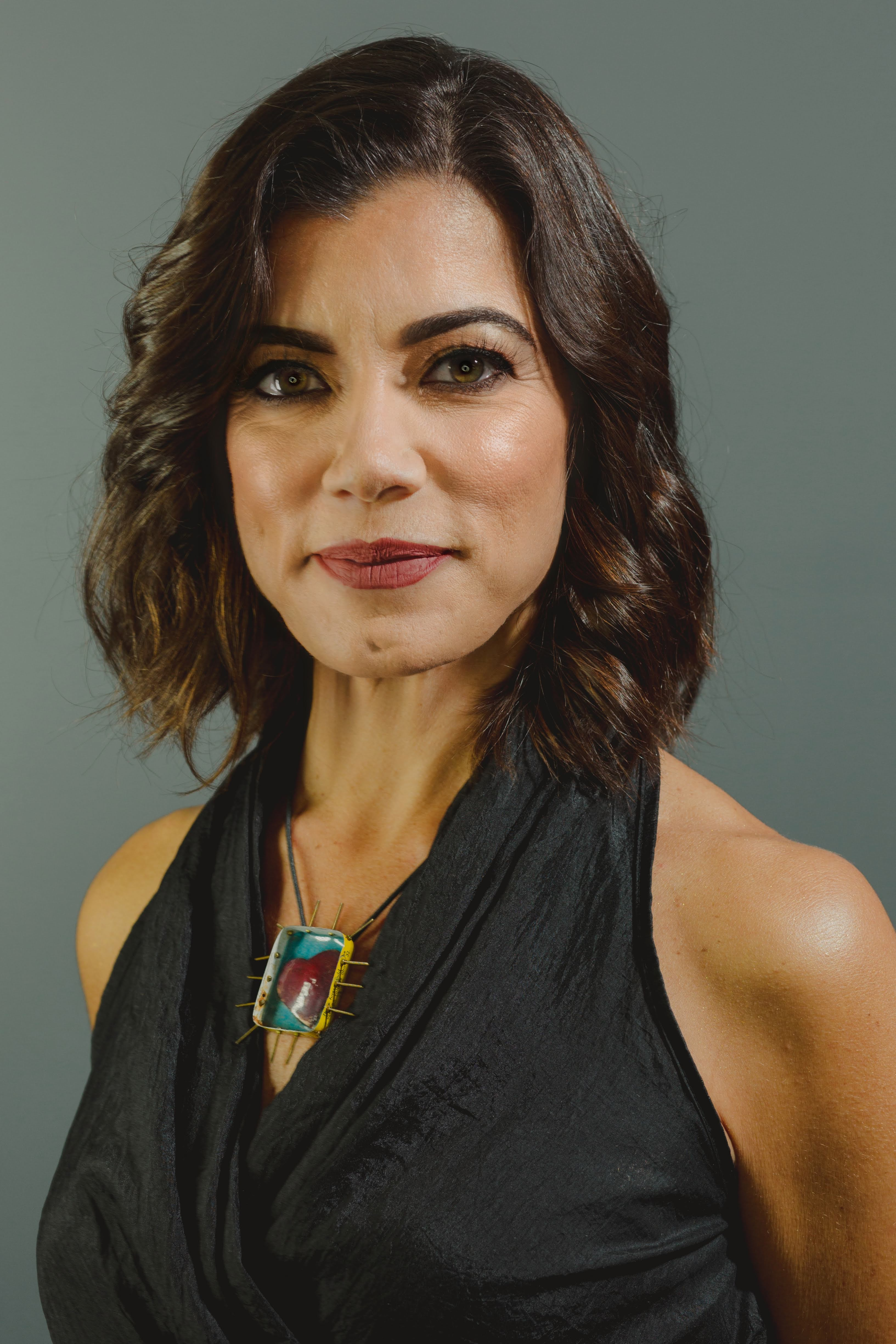
- Santos in 2018
- Born: 1973; Brazil
- Education: Boston University
- Occupations: Writer and journalist

Fernanda Santos (born 1973) is a Brazilian-American writer, journalism professor and contributing columnist for The Washington Post living in New York. In April 2024, she was announced as the managing editor of the news site The 19th.

She is one of three writers of the musical ¡Americano!, which opened Off Broadway in the spring of 2022. Her first book, "The Fire Line: The Story of the Granite Mountain Hotshots," won the Western Writers of America 2017 Spur Award for Best First Nonfiction Book and was one of two finalists in the Contemporary Nonfiction category.

== Biography ==
Santos was born in Brazil and immigrated to the United States at the age of 24. She received a master's degree in journalism from Boston University. Her husband, Mike Saucier, died of pancreatic cancer on November 1, 2017, at the age of 46. She has a daughter, Flora.

== Career ==
Santos has written in English and Portuguese, for newspapers and magazines in the United States and Brazil. She was the first Brazilian to work as a staff writer for The New York Times, where she worked for 12 years, most recently as its Phoenix Bureau chief. She joined the faculty of the Walter Cronkite School of Journalism and Mass Communication at Arizona State University on August 16, 2017 as a Southwest Borderlands Initiative professor of practice. She is a board member at the Arizona Latino Media Association and The Sauce Foundation, a 501c(3) created in the memory of her husband to raise money for pancreatic cancer research and journalism scholarships for first-generation college students. In her TEDx talk, "Hot Shot Teamwork," she talks about the nature of teams and the illusion of working alone. She is part of the creative team behind "!Americano!", a musical based on the real-life story of an undocumented immigrant from Arizona that will open at Phoenix Theater in January 2020.

Santos continues to write for various publications, in the United States and abroad. She has penned an essay about the meaning of citizenship for Guernica Magazine and written a column for Mexico's Animal Politico about training journalists in the Mexican border city Ciudad Juárez to report more fairly on the migrant crisis. Following the mass shooting in El Paso, Texas, in August 2019, she wrote an op-ed for The New York Times detailing why she no longer feels safe in the United States, one of several op-eds she has written for The Times. In February 2021, she was named a contributing opinions columnist for The Washington Post, to “provide commentary on issues ranging from immigration to Southwest politics and more,” according to the announcement. She won the Society of Professional Journalists’ Sigma Delta Chi Award for general excellence in column writing in 2021.

=== Book ===
Santos' book, "The Fire Line," tells the story of 19 firefighters killed in the Yarnell Hill Fire on June 30, 2013, all of them members of the same team, the Granite Mountain Hotshots. It was the largest loss of firefighters since the 9/11 attacks and the largest loss of forest firefighters in nearly a century. The book draws on her coverage of the fire for The New York Times. It was published by Flatiron Books in 2016. The Associated Press called it "a riveting and poignant narrative." People Magazine said it "will keep you on the edge of your seat and break your heart." The book is not connected with the movie "Only the Brave," Hollywood's adaptation of the deadly fire. One of the movie's main actors, James Badge Dale, who played the role of Captain Jesse Steed, said in interviews that it was Santos' stories that inspired him to join the film. In his review of the movie, Richard Brody of The New Yorker points out the "bitter, more complicated, and more political" nature of the dispute between the firefighters and its employer, the City of Prescott, Arizona, detailed by Santos yet not mentioned in the movie.
