= Swimming at the 1971 Pan American Games – Men's 200 metre butterfly =

Men's 200 metre butterfly at the 1971 Pan American Games
- Venue: -
- Dates: August 8 (preliminaries and finals)
- Competitors: from - nations

Medalists
Gold medal	Jorge Delgado	Ecuador
Silver medal	Robb Orr	United States
Bronze medal	Augusto González	Peru

The men's 200 metre butterfly competition of the swimming events at the 1971 Pan American Games took place on 8 August. The last Pan American Games champion was Mark Spitz of US.

This race consisted of four lengths of the pool, all lengths being in butterfly stroke.

At this race, two swimmers won the first medals of their countries in swimming at Pan American Games at all times: Jorge Delgado got the gold for Ecuador, and Augusto González, the bronze for Peru.

== Results ==
All times are in minutes and seconds.

KEY:	q	Fastest non-qualifiers	Q	Qualified	GR	Games record	NR	National record	PB	Personal best	SB	Seasonal best

=== Final ===
The final was held on August 8.

Rank	Name	Nationality	Time	Notes
1st place, gold medalist(s)	Jorge Delgado	Ecuador	2:06.4	= GR, SA
2nd place, silver medalist(s)	Robb Orr	United States	2:08.4	
3rd place, bronze medalist(s)	Augusto González	Peru	2:09.9	
4	Robert Clarke	United States	2:10.1	
5	Tomás Becerra	Colombia	2:11.2	
6	Ricardo Marmolejo	Mexico	2:12.0	
7	Ron Jacks	Canada	2:13.0	
8	Francisco Ramos	Brazil	2:14.2	
