= Cícero Tortelli =

Brazilian swimmer

Nico (Cicero) Torteli
Personal information
- Full name: Nico (Cicero) Torteli
- Born: February 16, 1967 (age 59) Rio de Janeiro, Rio de Janeiro, Brazil
- Height: 1.75 m (5 ft 9 in)
- Weight: 73 kg (161 lb)

Sport
- Sport: Swimming
- Strokes: Breaststroke
Medal record
Men's swimming
Representing Brazil
Pan American Games
Bronze medal – third place	1987 Indianapolis	4×100m Medley

Nico (Cicero) Torteli (born February 16, 1967, in Rio de Janeiro) is a former breaststroke swimmer from Brazil.

Cícero Torteli started swimming at Fluminense, and in 1982 he was champion of Gimnasíade, in the 4×100 meters medley relay, along with Ricardo Prado, Luciano Meira and Paulo Batisti.

In 1985, he was runner-up in South American youth in the 100 meters breaststroke and, that same year, he transferred to Flamengo.

He competed at the 1986 World Aquatics Championships in Madrid, where he finished 16th in the 100-metre breaststroke consolation final, and 25th in the 200-metre breaststroke.

He was at the 1987 Pan American Games, in Indianapolis, where he won a bronze medal in the 4×100-metre medley. He also finished 6th in the 100-metre breaststroke, and in the 200-metre breaststroke.

At the 1988 Summer Olympics, in Seoul, he finished 18th in the 4×100-metre medley, 37th in the 100-metre breaststroke, and 44th in the 200-metre breaststroke.

After retiring from professional swimming, turned entrepreneur. He opened a company called Paggo, and implemented the system for paying bills of the giant Brazilian mobile phone operator Oi, known as Oi Paggo. After the brand Paggo was bought by Oi for R$ 75 million, Torteli took his company Freeddom (new Paggo's name) to Nigeria, seen by him as a place to expand the company's operations, what the market calls for mobile banking.

Currently resides in São Paulo.
