= Swimming at the 1991 Pan American Games – Women's 50 metre freestyle =

Women's 50 metre freestyle at the 1991 Pan American Games
- Venue: -
- Dates: August 18 (preliminaries and finals)
- Competitors: from - nations

Medalists
Gold medal	Kristin Topham	Canada
Silver medal	Heather Hageman	United States
Bronze medal	Allison Bock	United States

The women's 50 metre freestyle competition of the swimming events at the 1991 Pan American Games took place on 18 August. The last Pan American Games champion was Jenny Thompson of US.

This race consisted of one length of the pool in freestyle.

== Results ==
All times are in minutes and seconds.

KEY:	q	Fastest non-qualifiers	Q	Qualified	GR	Games record	NR	National record	PB	Personal best	SB	Seasonal best

=== Final ===
The final was held on August 18.

Rank	Name	Nationality	Time	Notes
1st place, gold medalist(s)	Kristin Topham	Canada	26.01	GR
2nd place, silver medalist(s)	Heather Hageman	United States	26.26	
3rd place, bronze medalist(s)	Allison Bock	United States	26.45	
4	Deborah Figueroa	Cuba	26.89	
5	Sharon Turner	Canada	27.10	
6	Paolette Filippini	Brazil	27.24	
7	Raquel James	Trinidad and Tobago	27.30	
8	Paula Marsiglia	Brazil	27.46	
