= Swimming at the 1971 Pan American Games – Women's 100 metre breaststroke =

Women's 100 metre breaststroke at the 1971 Pan American Games
- Venue: -
- Date: 7 August 1971 (preliminaries and finals)
- Competitors: from - nations

Medalists
| Gold medal | Sylvia Dockerill | Canada |
| Silver medal | Linda Kurtz | United States |
| Bronze medal | Lynn Colella | United States |

The women's 100 metre breaststroke competition of the swimming events at the 1971 Pan American Games took place on 7 August 1971. The last Pan American Games champion was Catie Ball of US.

This race consisted of two lengths of the pool, both lengths being in breaststroke.

== Results ==
All times are in minutes and seconds.

| KEY: | q | Fastest non-qualifiers | Q | Qualified | GR | Games record | NR | National record | PB | Personal best | SB | Seasonal best |

=== Final ===
The final was held on 7 August 1971.

| Rank | Name | Nationality | Time | Notes |
|---|---|---|---|---|
| 1st place, gold medalist(s) | Sylvia Dockerill | Canada | 1:18.6 | |
| 2nd place, silver medalist(s) | Linda Kurtz | United States | 1:19.3 | |
| 3rd place, bronze medalist(s) | Lynn Colella | United States | 1:19.7 | |
| 4 | Carol Kruger | Canada | 1:20.4 | |
| 5 | Cristina Teixeira | Brazil | 1:21.0 | |
| 6 | Leonar Ureta | Mexico | 1:21.7 | |
| 7 | Eliane Pereira | Brazil | 1:22.8 | |
