= Swimming at the 1971 Pan American Games – Women's 800 metre freestyle =

Women's 800 metre freestyle at the 1971 Pan American Games
- Venue: -
- Dates: August 11 (preliminaries and finals)
- Competitors: from - nations

Medalists
Gold medal	Cathy Calhoun	United States
Silver medal	Cynthia Enze	United States
Bronze medal	María Teresa Ramírez	Mexico

The women's 800 metre freestyle competition of the swimming events at the 1971 Pan American Games took place on 11 August. The last Pan American Games champion was Debbie Meyer of US.

This race consisted of sixteen lengths of the pool, all in freestyle.

== Results ==
All times are in minutes and seconds.

KEY:	q	Fastest non-qualifiers	Q	Qualified	GR	Games record	NR	National record	PB	Personal best	SB	Seasonal best

=== Final ===
The final was held on August 11.

Rank	Name	Nationality	Time	Notes
1st place, gold medalist(s)	Cathy Calhoun	United States	9:15.2	
2nd place, silver medalist(s)	Cynthia Enze	United States	9:32.2	
3rd place, bronze medalist(s)	María Teresa Ramírez	Mexico	9:44.3	
4	Roselína Angel	Colombia	9:50.0	
5	Laura Vaca	Mexico	9:50.8	
6	Randi Bjune	Canada	9:56.3	
7	Marcela Lizarzaburu	Ecuador	10:04.4	
8	Kin Cassidy	Canada	10:07.5	
9	Virgínia Dany	Puerto Rico	10:27.2	
10	Liana Vicens	Puerto Rico	10:34.2	
11	Maria Barraga	Peru	10:35.1	
