= Karen Horning =

Peruvian swimmer

Personal information
- Nationality: Peruvian
- Born: November 28, 1966 (age 59)
- Height: 1.71 m (5 ft 7 in)

Sport
- Sport: Swimming
- Strokes: Breaststroke

Karen Horning (born November 28, 1966) is a former female breaststroke swimmer, who swam for Peru at the 1988 Summer Olympics.

At the Games, she finished in 28th (100 m breaststroke) and in 24th place (200 m breaststroke), setting the nation record latter (2:37.84). As of late 2009, it still stands as the Peru Record.
