= Alicia Boscatto =

Argentine swimmer

Personal information
- Born: June 16, 1960 (age 66)
Medal record
Women's swimming
Representing Argentina
Pan American Games
Silver medal – second place	1987 Indianapolis	200m Breaststroke

Alicia María Boscatto (born June 16, 1960) is a retired breaststroke swimmer from Argentina, who won the silver medal in the women's 200m Breaststroke event at the 1987 Pan American Games. She represented her native country at two consecutive Summer Olympics, starting in 1984 in Los Angeles, California.
