= Swimming at the 1998 World Aquatics Championships – Women's 4 × 100 metre freestyle relay =

Women's 4×100 metre freestyle relay at the 1998 FINA World Championships
- Date: 14 January 1998
- Winning time: 3 minutes 42.11 seconds

Medalists
gold medal	Lindsey Farella; Amy Van Dyken; Barbara Bedford; Jenny Thompson	United States
silver medal	Sandra Völker; Franziska van Almsick; Simone Osygus; Katrin Meissner	Germany
bronze medal	Sarah Ryan; Rebecca Creedy; Susie O'Neill; Angela Kennedy	Australia

The final and the qualifying heats of the women's 4×100 metre freestyle relay event at the 1998 World Aquatics Championships were held on Wednesday 14 January 1998 in Perth, Western Australia.

== Final ==
Rank	Team	Time
Gold medal	United States; Lindsey Farella; Amy Van Dyken; Barbara Bedford; Jenny Thompson	3:42.11; 56.61; 54.94; 56.22; 54.14
Silver medal	Germany; Sandra Völker; Franziska van Almsick; Simone Osygus; Katrin Meissner	3:43.11; 55.68; 55.95; 56.58; 54.90
Bronze medal	Australia; Sarah Ryan; Rebecca Creedy; Susie O'Neill; Angela Kennedy	3:43.71; 56.24; 55.80; 55.40; 56.27
4	Sweden; Malin Svahnström; Therese Alshammar; Louise Jöhncke; Josefin Lillhage	3:44.28; 56.83; 55.92; 55.50; 56.03
5	Netherlands; Inge de Bruijn; Angela Postma; Manon Masseurs; Wilma van Hofwegen	3:44.64; 55.85; 56.85; 56.38; 55.56
6	Canada; Laura Nicholls; Nicole Davey; Shannon Shakespeare; Marianne Limpert	3:44.90; 56.49; 56.64; 55.54; 56.23
7	Great Britain; Sue Rolph; Claire Huddart; Melanie Marshall; Karen Pickering	3:45.30; 56.07; 56.72; 57.13; 55.38
8	China; Shan Ying; Le Jingyi; Sun Guling; Zhu Yingwen	3:47.39; 56.56; 57.59; 56.16; 57.08

== Qualifying heats ==
=== Heat 1 ===
Rank	Team	Time
1	United States; Catherine Fox; Lindsey Farella; Melanie Valerio; Barbara Bedford	3:44.89
2	Australia; Sarah Ryan; Rebecca Creedy; Angela Kennedy; Kate Godfrey	3:45.80
3	Germany; Katrin Meissner; Antje Buschschulte; Silvia Szalai; Franziska van Almsick	3:45.84
4	Great Britain; Sue Rolph; Claire Huddart; Melanie Marshall; Karen Pickering	3:46.27
5	Denmark; Sophia Skou; Mette Jacobsen; Mia Muusfeldt; Berit Puggaard	3:48.19
6	Belgium; Liesbet Dreesen; Tine Bossuyt; Sofie Wolfs; Fabienne Dufour	3:49.69
7	Brazil; Tatiana Lemos; Raquel Takaya; Monique Ferreira; Lucia Santos	3:59.48

=== Heat 2 ===
Rank	Team	Time
1	Canada; Laura Nicholls; Nicole Davey; Shannon Shakespeare; Marianne Limpert	3:45.83
2	Sweden; Johanna Sjöberg; Therese Alshammar; Malin Svahnström; Josefin Lillhage	3:46.08
3	China; Sun Guling; Zhu Yingwen; Le Jingyi; Shan Ying	3:47.05
4	Netherlands; Wilma van Hofwegen; Angela Postma; Suze Valen; Manon Masseurs	3:47.37
5	Italy; Luisa Striani; Karina Vanni; Viviana Susin; Cecilia Vianini	3:49.02
6	Russia; Svetlana Leshukova; Elena Nazemnova; Tatyana Litovchenko; Inna Yaitskaya	3:49.28
7	Chinese Taipei; Lin Meng-Chieh; Chiang Tzu-Ying; Lin Chi-Chan; Tsai Shu-min	4:02.05

== See also ==
- 1996 Women's Olympic Games 4x100m Freestyle (Atlanta)
- 1997 Women's World Championships (SC) 4x100m Freestyle (Gothenburg)
- 1997 Women's European Championships (LC) 4x100m Freestyle (Seville)
- 2000 Women's Olympic Games 4x100m Freestyle (Sydney)
