= 1999 Pan Pacific Swimming Championships – Women's 400 metre freestyle =

Women's 400 metre freestyle at the 1999 Pan Pacific Swimming Championships
- Venue: Sydney International Aquatic Centre
- Dates: August 22, 1999 (heats & finals)
- Competitors: 24 from 9 nations
- Winning time: 4:08.39

Medalists
gold medal	Brooke Bennett	United States
silver medal	Lindsay Benko	United States
bronze medal	Claudia Poll	Costa Rica

The women's 400 metre freestyle competition at the 1999 Pan Pacific Swimming Championships took place on August 22 at the Sydney International Aquatic Centre. The last champion was Claudia Poll of Costa Rica.

This race consisted of eight lengths of the pool, with all eight being in the freestyle stroke.

== Records ==
Prior to this competition, the existing world and Pan Pacific records were as follows:

World record	Janet Evans (USA)	4:03.85	Seoul, South Korea	September 22, 1988
Pan Pacific Championships record	Janet Evans (USA)	4:04.53	Tokyo, Japan	August 1989

== Results ==
All times are in minutes and seconds.

KEY:	q	Fastest non-qualifiers	Q	Qualified	CR	Championships record	NR	National record	PB	Personal best	SB	Seasonal best

=== Heats ===
The first round was held on August 22.

Rank	Name	Nationality	Time	Notes
1	Brooke Bennett	United States	4:09.15	Q
2	Lindsay Benko	United States	4:10.48	Q
3	Ellen Stonebraker	United States	4:10.83	
4	Claudia Poll	Costa Rica	4:12.75	Q
5	Cristina Teuscher	United States	4:13.67	
6	Rachel Harris	Australia	4:14.84	Q
7	Melissa Deary	United States	4:15.10	
8	Charlene Benzie	Australia	4:15.65	Q
9	Sachiko Yamada	Japan	4:16.95	Q
10	Danielle Woods	Australia	4:17.46	
11	Sarah D'Arcy	Australia	4:17.80	
12	Jennifer Reilly	Australia	4:18.06	
13	Molly Freedman	United States	4:18.08	
14	Kim van Selm	South Africa	4:21.39	Q
15	Danielle Bell	Canada	4:21.51	Q
16	Sarah Tolar	United States	4:22.39	
17	Tsai Shu-min	Chinese Taipei	4:22.50	
18	Lindsay Beavers	Canada	4:24.47	
19	Junko Nakatani	Japan	4:24.81	
20	Elizabeth Van Welie	New Zealand	4:25.29	
21	Natalie du Toit	South Africa	4:26.26	
22	Deanna Schonwald	New Zealand	4:26.96	
23	Katie Brambley	Canada	4:27.02	
24	Roh Joo-hee	South Korea	4:27.25	

=== Final ===
The final was held on August 22.

Rank	Lane	Nationality	Time	Notes
1st place, gold medalist(s)	Brooke Bennett	United States	4:08.39	
2nd place, silver medalist(s)	Lindsay Benko	United States	4:08.75	
3rd place, bronze medalist(s)	Claudia Poll	Costa Rica	4:11.54	
4	Rachel Harris	Australia	4:14.80	
5	Sachiko Yamada	Japan	4:15.54	
6	Charlene Benzie	Australia	4:15.76	
7	Danielle Bell	Canada	4:21.36	
8	Kim van Selm	South Africa	4:21.66	
