= Swimming at the 1995 Pan American Games – Women's 4 × 200 metre freestyle relay =

Women's 4 × 200 metre freestyle relay at the 1995 Pan American Games
- Venue: Complejo Natatorio
- Dates: between March 12–17 (preliminaries and finals)
- Competitors: from - nations

Medalists
Gold medal	Trina Jackson, Dady Vincent, Catherine Fox and Cristina Teuscher	United States
Silver medal	-, -, - and -	Canada
Bronze medal	Alicia Barrancos, María Pereyra, Natalia Scapinello and María Garrone	Argentina

The women's 4 × 200 metre freestyle relay competition of the swimming events at the 1995 Pan American Games took place between March 12–17 at the Complejo Natatorio. The last Pan American Games champion was the United States.

This race consisted of sixteen lengths of the pool. Each of the four swimmers completed four lengths of the pool. The first swimmer had to touch the wall before the second could leave the starting block.

== Results ==
All times are in minutes and seconds.

KEY:	q	Fastest non-qualifiers	Q	Qualified	GR	Games record	NR	National record	PB	Personal best	SB	Seasonal best

=== Final ===
The final was held between March 12–17.

Rank	Name	Nationality	Time	Notes
1st place, gold medalist(s)	Trina Jackson; Dady Vincent; Catherine Fox; Cristina Teuscher	United States	8:07.30	
2nd place, silver medalist(s)	- - - -	Canada	8:08.25	
3rd place, bronze medalist(s)	Alicia Barrancos; María Pereyra; Natalia Scapinello; María Garrone	Argentina	8:27.87	
4	- - - -	Brazil	8:28.33	
5	- - - -	Cuba	8:48.16	
6	- - - -	-	-	
7	- - - -	-	-	
8	- - - -	-	-	
