= Swimming at the 1995 Pan American Games – Women's 200 metre freestyle =

Women's 200 metre freestyle at the 1995 Pan American Games
- Venue: Complejo Natatorio
- Dates: between March 12–17 (preliminaries and finals)
- Competitors: from - nations

Medalists
Gold medal	Cristina Teuscher	United States
Silver medal	Marianne Limpert	Canada
Bronze medal	Dady Vincent	United States

The women's 200 metre freestyle competition of the swimming events at the 1995 Pan American Games took place between March 12–17 at the Complejo Natatorio. The last Pan American Games champion was Lisa Jacob from United States.

This race consisted of four lengths of the pool, all in freestyle.

== Results ==
All times are in minutes and seconds.

KEY:	q	Fastest non-qualifiers	Q	Qualified	GR	Games record	NR	National record	PB	Personal best	SB	Seasonal best

=== Final ===
The final was held between March 12–17.

Rank	Name	Nationality	Time	Notes
1st place, gold medalist(s)	Cristina Teuscher	United States	2:01.49	
2nd place, silver medalist(s)	Marianne Limpert	Canada	2:02.05	
3rd place, bronze medalist(s)	Dady Vincent	United States	2:03.37	
4	Stephanie Richardson	Canada	2:04.89	
5	Daniela Romero	Mexico	2:05.51	
6	Maria Garrone	Argentina	2:05.80	
7	Alicia Alejandr	Argentina	2:06.96	
8	Julianna Filippini	Brazil	2:07.32	
