= 1999 Pan Pacific Swimming Championships – Women's 800 metre freestyle =

Women's 800 metre freestyle at the 1999 Pan Pacific Swimming Championships
- Venue: Sydney International Aquatic Centre
- Dates: August 27, 1999 (heats); August 28, 1999 (final)
- Competitors: 14 from 7 nations
- Winning time: 8:25.06

Medalists
gold medal	Brooke Bennett	United States
silver medal	Rachel Harris	Australia
bronze medal	Ellen Stonebraker	United States

The women's 800 metre freestyle competition at the 1999 Pan Pacific Swimming Championships took place on August 27–28 at the Sydney International Aquatic Centre. The last champion was Brooke Bennett of US.

== Records ==
Prior to this competition, the existing world and Pan Pacific records were as follows:

World record	Janet Evans (USA)	8:16.22	Tokyo, Japan	August 20, 1989
Pan Pacific Championships record	Janet Evans (USA)	8:16.22	Tokyo, Japan	August 20, 1989

== Results ==
All times are in minutes and seconds.

KEY:	q	Fastest non-qualifiers	Q	Qualified	CR	Championships record	NR	National record	PB	Personal best	SB	Seasonal best

=== Heats ===
The first round was held on August 27.

Rank	Name	Nationality	Time	Notes
1	Brooke Bennett	United States	8:26.34	Q
2	Rachel Harris	Australia	8:41.17	Q
3	Ellen Stonebraker	United States	8:42.95	Q
4	Melissa Deary	United States	8:43.16	
5	Joanne Malar	Canada	8:43.41	Q
6	Sachiko Yamada	Japan	8:45.61	Q
7	Danielle Woods	Australia	8:45.73	Q
8	Charlene Benzie	Australia	8:46.13	
9	Lindsay Beavers	Canada	8:56.95	Q
10	Danielle Bell	Canada	8:58.41	
11	Natalie du Toit	South Africa	9:08.75	Q
12	Katie Brambley	Canada	9:09.08	
13	Sia Wai Yen	Malaysia	9:14.78	
14	Kuan Chia-hsien	Chinese Taipei	9:20.69	

=== Final ===
The final was held on August 28.

Rank	Lane	Nationality	Time	Notes
1st place, gold medalist(s)	Brooke Bennett	United States	8:25.06	
2nd place, silver medalist(s)	Rachel Harris	Australia	8:37.23	
3rd place, bronze medalist(s)	Ellen Stonebraker	United States	8:40.39	
4	Danielle Woods	Australia	8:40.73	
5	Joanne Malar	Canada	8:45.25	
6	Sachiko Yamada	Japan	8:45.47	
7	Lindsay Beavers	Canada	8:49.63	
8	Natalie du Toit	South Africa	9:11.38	
