= Swimming at the 1995 Pan American Games – Women's 100 metre freestyle =

Women's 100 metre freestyle at the 1995 Pan American Games
- Venue: Complejo Natatorio
- Dates: between March 12–17 (preliminaries and finals)
- Competitors: from - nations

Medalists
Gold medal	Angel Martino	United States
Silver medal	Amy Van Dyken	United States
Bronze medal	Marianne Limpert	Canada

The women's 100 metre freestyle competition of the swimming events at the 1995 Pan American Games took place between March 12–17 at the Complejo Natatorio. The last Pan American Games champion was Ashley Tappin of US.

This race consisted of two lengths of the pool, both lengths being in freestyle.

== Results ==
All times are in minutes and seconds.

KEY:	q	Fastest non-qualifiers	Q	Qualified	GR	Games record	NR	National record	PB	Personal best	SB	Seasonal best

=== Final ===
The final was held between March 12–17.

Rank	Name	Nationality	Time	Notes
1st place, gold medalist(s)	Angel Martino	United States	55.62	
2nd place, silver medalist(s)	Amy Van Dyken	United States	55.92	
3rd place, bronze medalist(s)	Marianne Limpert	Canada	56.80	
4	Shannon Shakespeare	Canada	57.33	
5	Gabrielle Rose	Brazil	57.92	
6	Maria Garrone	Argentina	58.22	
7	Paula Aguilar	Brazil	58.84	
8	Siobhan Cropper	Trinidad and Tobago	59.08	
