= Swimming at the 1997 European Aquatics Championships – Women's 4 × 100 metre freestyle relay =

The final of the Women's 4 × 100 m Freestyle Relay event at the European LC Championships 1997 was held on Thursday 21 August 1997 in Seville, Spain.

== Results ==
=== Final ===
RANK	FINAL	TIME
	GERMANY; Katrin Meissner; Simone Osygus; Antje Buschschulte; Sandra Völker	3:41.49; 56.17; 55.60; 55.63; 54.09
	SWEDEN; Louise Jöhncke; Josefin Lillhage; Therese Alshammar; Malin Svahnström	3:43.69; 56.10; 55.95; 55.86; 55.78
	RUSSIA; Svetlana Leshukova; Natalya Meshcheryakova; Inna Yaitskaya; Nadezhda Chemezova	3:44.72; 56.93; 54.97; 56.23; 56.59
4.	GREAT BRITAIN; Sue Rolph; Claire Huddart; Janing Benton; Karen Pickering	3:45.93; 56.34; 56.49; 57.62; 55.38
5.	DENMARK; Sophia Skou; Mette Jacobsen; Mia Muusfeldt; Berit Puggaard	3:46.74; 57.28; 55.48; 56.36; 57.62
6.	NETHERLANDS; Wilma van Hofwegen; Angela Postma; Manon Masseurs; Suze Valen	3:47.05; 56.46; 56.73; 56.97; 56.89
7.	ITALY; Cecilia Vianini; Ilaria Tocchini; Viviana Susin; Luisa Striani	3:48.97; 57.05; 57.75; 57.06; 57.11
8.	SPAIN; Claudia Franco; Ana Belén Palomo; Laura Roca; Blanca Cerón	DSQ; 56.91; 57.30; 57.77; 57.17

=== Qualifying Heats ===
RANK	HEATS RANKING	TIME
1.	GERMANY	3:45.14
2.	SWEDEN	3:46.60
3.	RUSSIA	3:47.71
4.	NETHERLANDS	3:48.01
5.	SPAIN	3:48.68
6.	GREAT BRITAIN	3:48.75
7.	DENMARK	3:49.30
8.	ITALY	3:49.59
9.	SLOVENIA	3:50.69
10.	ROMANIA	3:54.09
11.	SWITZERLAND	3:54.46
—	BELGIUM	DSQ

== See also ==
- 1996 Women's Olympic Games 4 × 100 m Freestyle Relay
- 1997 Women's World Championships (SC) 4 × 100 m Freestyle Relay
