= Swimming at the 1996 Summer Olympics – Women's 4 × 100 metre freestyle relay =

Women's 4 × 100 metre freestyle relay at the Games of the XXVI Olympiad
- Venue: Georgia Tech Aquatic Center
- Date: 22 July 1996 (heats & final)
- Competitors: 81 from 19 nations
- Teams: 19
- Winning time: 3:39.29 OR

Medalists
1st place, gold medalist(s)		Angel Martino, Amy Van Dyken, Catherine Fox, Jenny Thompson, Lisa Jacob*, Melanie Valerio*	United States
2nd place, silver medalist(s)		Le Jingyi, Chao Na, Nian Yun, Shan Ying	China
3rd place, bronze medalist(s)		Sandra Völker, Simone Osygus, Antje Buschschulte, Franziska van Almsick, Meike Freitag*; *Indicates the swimmer only competed in the preliminary heats.	Germany

The women's 4 × 100 metre freestyle relay event at the 1996 Summer Olympics took place on 22 July at the Georgia Tech Aquatic Center in Atlanta, United States.

== Records ==
Prior to this competition, the existing world and Olympic records were as follows.

World record	China (CHN); Le Ying (54.31); Shan Ying (54.38); Lü Bin (55.09); Le Jingyi (54.13)	3:37.91	Rome, Italy	7 September 1994
Olympic record	United States; Nicole Haislett (55.33); Dara Torres (55.33); Angel Martino (54.79); Jenny Thompson (54.01)	3:39.46	Barcelona, Spain	28 July 1992

The following new world and Olympic records were set during this competition.

Date	Event	Name	Nationality	Time	Record
22 July	Final	Angel Martino (55.34); Amy Van Dyken (53.91); Catherine Fox (55.93); Jenny Thompson (54.11)	United States	3:39.29	OR

== Results ==
=== Heats ===
Rule: The eight fastest teams advance to the final (Q).

Rank	Heat	Lane	Nation	Swimmers	Time	Notes
1	2	4	United States	Jenny Thompson (55.04); Catherine Fox (55.03); Lisa Jacob (56.31); Melanie Valerio (55.98)	3:42.36	Q
2	2	2	Netherlands	Marianne Muis (55.60); Manon Masseurs (56.54); Wilma van Hofwegen (55.24); Minouche Smit (56.25)	3:43.63	Q
3	3	4	China	Shan Ying (56.03); Chao Na (56.57); Nian Yun (55.80); Le Jingyi (55.66)	3:44.06	Q
4	3	5	Germany	Simone Osygus (56.50); Antje Buschschulte (55.49); Meike Freitag (56.43); Franziska van Almsick (55.75)	3:44.17	Q
5	2	3	Sweden	Louise Jöhncke (56.81); Johanna Sjöberg (56.63); Louise Karlsson (56.23); Linda Olofsson (55.72)	3:45.39	Q
6	3	3	Canada	Shannon Shakespeare (56.05); Julie Howard (56.79); Andrea Moody (56.55); Marianne Limpert (56.27)	3:45.66	Q, NR
7	1	5	Russia	Svetlana Leshukova (57.31); Nataliya Sorokina (57.07); Yelena Nazemnova (56.59); Natalya Meshcheryakova (56.36)	3:47.33	Q
8	1	4	Australia	Anna Windsor (59.03); Sarah Ryan (55.59); Lise Mackie (57.02); Julia Greville (56.30)	3:47.94	Q
9	1	3	Great Britain	Sue Rolph (56.61); Alison Sheppard (57.52); Carrie Willmott (58.10); Karen Pickering (56.03)	3:48.26	
10	1	6	France	Solenne Figuès (57.12); Jacqueline Delord (57.56); Casey Legler (56.98); Marianne Le Verge (56.64)	3:48.30	
11	2	6	Romania	Lorena Diaconescu (56.89); Florina Herea (58.16); Andreea Trufaşu (57.18); Luminița Dobrescu (56.20)	3:48.43	
12	2	5	Japan	Sumika Minamoto (57.48); Naoko Imoto (56.81); Eri Yamanoi (58.19); Suzu Chiba (56.29)	3:48.77	
13	3	6	Denmark	Mette Nielsen (57.85); Mette Jacobsen (56.01); Karen Egdal (57.63); Ditte Jensen (57.44)	3:48.93	
14	3	2	Spain	Blanca Cerón (57.52); Fátima Madrid (57.85); Susanna Garabatos (57.91); Claudia Franco (56.19)	3:49.47	NR
15	3	1	Belarus	Sviatlana Zhidko (58.11); Inga Borodich (57.49); Natalya Baranovskaya (57.90); Alena Popchanka (56.72)	3:50.22	NR
16	1	2	Finland	Minna Salmela (57.13); Paula Harmokivi (57.56); Marja Pärssinen (57.16); Marja Heikkilä (58.48)	3:50.33	
17	2	7	Switzerland	Dominique Diezi (57.60); Nicole Zahnd (58.35); Lara Preacco (58.83); Sandrine Paquier (58.52)	3:53.30	
18	3	7	Chinese Taipei	Chang Wei-chia (58.49); Tsai Shu-min (59.79); Lin Chien-ju (58.38); Lin Chi-chan (59.73)	3:56.39	
19	1	7	South Korea	Lee Bo-eun (58.77); Seo So-yung (58.72); Lee Jie-hyun (59.38); Jeong Eun-na (1:00.96)	3:57.83	

=== Final ===
Rank	Lane	Nation	Swimmers	Time	Notes
1st place, gold medalist(s)	4	United States	Angel Martino (55.34); Amy Van Dyken (53.91); Catherine Fox (55.93); Jenny Thompson (54.11)	3:39.29	OR
2nd place, silver medalist(s)	3	China	Le Jingyi (54.79); Chao Na (55.40); Nian Yun (55.42); Shan Ying (54.87)	3:40.48	
3rd place, bronze medalist(s)	6	Germany	Sandra Völker (55.70); Simone Osygus (56.05); Antje Buschschulte (55.20); Franziska van Almsick (54.53)	3:41.48	
4	5	Netherlands	Marianne Muis (55.73); Minouche Smit (56.15); Wilma van Hofwegen (55.53); Karin Brienesse (54.99)	3:42.40	NR
5	2	Sweden	Linda Olofsson (55.75); Louise Jöhncke (56.32); Louise Karlsson (56.07); Johanna Sjöberg (56.77)	3:44.91	NR
6	8	Australia	Sarah Ryan (56.06); Julia Greville (56.27); Lise Mackie (57.03); Susie O'Neill (55.95)	3:45.31	
7	7	Canada	Shannon Shakespeare (56.07); Julie Howard (57.03); Andrea Moody (56.74); Marianne Limpert (56.43)	3:46.27	
	1	Russia	Yelena Nazemnova; Natalya Sorokina; Svetlana Leshukova; Natalya Meshcheryakova	DSQ	
