= Swimming at the 1995 Pan American Games – Women's 400 metre freestyle =

Women's 400 metre freestyle at the 1995 Pan American Games
- Venue: Complejo Natatorio
- Dates: between March 12–17 (preliminaries and finals)
- Competitors: from - nations

Medalists
| Gold medal | Brooke Bennett | United States |
| Silver medal | Cristina Teuscher | United States |
| Bronze medal | Katie Brambley | Canada |

The women's 400 metre freestyle competition of the swimming events at the 1995 Pan American Games took place between March 12–17 at the Complejo Natatorio. The last Pan American Games champion was Jane Skillman of US.

This race consisted of eight lengths of the pool, with all eight being in the freestyle stroke.

== Results ==
All times are in minutes and seconds.

| KEY: | q | Fastest non-qualifiers | Q | Qualified | GR | Games record | NR | National record | PB | Personal best | SB | Seasonal best |

=== Final ===
The final was held between March 12–17.

| Rank | Name | Nationality | Time | Notes |
|---|---|---|---|---|
| 1st place, gold medalist(s) | Brooke Bennett | United States | 4:11.78 | |
| 2nd place, silver medalist(s) | Cristina Teuscher | United States | 4:13.97 | |
| 3rd place, bronze medalist(s) | Katie Brambley | Canada | 4:18.74 | |
| 4 | Stephanie Richardson | Canada | 4:19.56 | |
| 5 | Alicia Barrancos | Argentina | 4:22.26 | |
| 6 | Juliana Gomes | Brazil | 4:26.57 | |
| 7 | Luciana Abe | Brazil | 4:27.64 | |
| 8 | Sonia Fonseca | Puerto Rico | 4:29.04 | |
