= 1997 FINA Short Course World Championships – Women's 4 × 100 metre freestyle relay =

The finals and the qualifying heats of the Women's 4 × 100 metres Freestyle Relay event at the 1997 FINA Short Course World Championships were held on the third day of the competition, on Saturday 19 April 1997 in Gothenburg, Sweden.

== Finals ==
Rank	Final	Time
	China; Le Jingyi; Chao Na; Shan Ying; Nian Yun	3:34.55 WR; 53.32; 54.73; 53.55; 52.95
	Germany; Simone Osygus; Antje Buschschulte; Katrin Meissner; Sandra Völker	3:34.69 ER
	Sweden; Johanna Sjöberg; Louise Karlsson; Malin Svahnström; Therese Alshammar	3:38.07
4.	Great Britain	3:39.98
5.	Australia	3:40.55
6.	United States; Lindsey Farella; Jennifer Parmenter; Misty Hyman; Jenny Thompson	3:41.86
7.	Canada	3:43.32
8.	South Africa	3:51.45

== See also ==
- 1996 Women's Olympic Games 4 × 100 m Freestyle Relay
- 1997 Women's European LC Championships 4 × 100 m Freestyle Relay
