= Swimming at the 1999 Pan American Games – Women's 800 metre freestyle =

Women's 800 metre freestyle at the 1999 Pan American Games
- Venue: Pan Am Pool
- Dates: August 5 (preliminaries) and 6 (finals)
- Competitors: from - nations

Medalists
Gold medal	Kaitlin Sandeno	United States
Silver medal	Janelle Atkinson	Jamaica
Bronze medal	Lindsay Beavers	Canada

The women's 800 metre freestyle competition of the swimming events at the 1999 Pan American Games took place on 5 August (preliminaries) and 6 (finals) at the Pan Am Pool. The last Pan American Games champion was Trina Jackson of US.

This race consisted of sixteen lengths of the pool, all in freestyle.

== Results ==
All times are in minutes and seconds.

KEY:	q	Fastest non-qualifiers	Q	Qualified	GR	Games record	NR	National record	PB	Personal best	SB	Seasonal best

=== Heats ===
The first round was held on August 5.

Rank	Name	Nationality	Time	Notes
1	Kaitlin Sandeno	United States	8:49.25	Q
2	-	-	-	Q
3	-	-	-	Q
4	-	-	-	Q
5	Alexis Binder	United States	8:53.97	Q
6	-	-	-	Q
7	-	-	-	Q
8	-	-	-	Q

=== Final ===
The final was held on August 6.

Rank	Name	Nationality	Time	Notes
1st place, gold medalist(s)	Kaitlin Sandeno	United States	8:34.65	GR
2nd place, silver medalist(s)	Janelle Atkinson	Jamaica	8:39.51	
3rd place, bronze medalist(s)	Lindsay Beavers	Canada	8:44.21	
4	Alexis Binder	United States	8:48.15	
5	Danielle Bell	Canada	8:51.89	
6	Ana Muniz	Brazil	8:52.36	
7	Nayara Ribeiro	Brazil	8:57.61	
8	Michelle Diago Jensen	Puerto Rico	8:59.31	
