= Swimming at the 1995 Pan American Games – Women's 800 metre freestyle =

Women's 800 metre freestyle at the 1995 Pan American Games
- Venue: Complejo Natatorio
- Dates: between March 12–17 (preliminaries and finals)
- Competitors: from - nations

Medalists
| Gold medal | Trina Jackson | United States |
| Silver medal | Brooke Bennett | United States |
| Bronze medal | Alicia Barrancos | Argentina |

The women's 800 metre freestyle competition of the swimming events at the 1995 Pan American Games took place between March 12–17 at the Complejo Natatorio. The last Pan American Games champion was Jane Skillman of US.

This race consisted of sixteen lengths of the pool, all in freestyle.

== Results ==
All times are in minutes and seconds.

| KEY: | q | Fastest non-qualifiers | Q | Qualified | GR | Games record | NR | National record | PB | Personal best | SB | Seasonal best |

=== Final ===
The final was held between March 12–17.

| Rank | Name | Nationality | Time | Notes |
|---|---|---|---|---|
| 1st place, gold medalist(s) | Trina Jackson | United States | 8:35.42 | |
| 2nd place, silver medalist(s) | Brooke Bennett | United States | 8:47.99 | |
| 3rd place, bronze medalist(s) | Alicia Barrancos | Argentina | 8:49.57 | |
| 4 | Katie Brambley | Canada | 8:50.68 | |
| 5 | Stephanie Richardson | Canada | 8:50.83 | |
| 6 | Luciana Abe | Brazil | 9:05.83 | |
| 7 | Mariana Rangel | Brazil | 9:06.56 | |
| 8 | Sonia Fonseca | Puerto Rico | 9:16.94 | |
