= Swimming at the 2000 Summer Olympics – Women's 200 metre individual medley =

Women's 200 metre individual medley at the Games of the XXVII Olympiad
- Venue: Sydney International Aquatic Centre
- Date: September 18, 2000 (heats & semifinals); September 19, 2000 (final)
- Competitors: 36 from 28 nations
- Winning time: 2:10.68 OR

Medalists
1st place, gold medalist(s)		Yana Klochkova	Ukraine
2nd place, silver medalist(s)		Beatrice Câșlaru	Romania
3rd place, bronze medalist(s)		Cristina Teuscher	United States

The women's 200 metre individual medley event at the 2000 Summer Olympics took place on 18–19 September at the Sydney International Aquatic Centre in Sydney, Australia.

Yana Klochkova, Ukraine's swimming pride and three-time European champion, became the fourth swimmer in Olympic history to strike a medley double, since Claudia Kolb did so in 1968, Tracy Caulkins in 1984, and Michelle Smith in 1996. Leading from start to finish, she established a sterling time of 2:10.68 to cut off Lin Li's eight-year Olympic record by a comfortable margin of 0.95 seconds. Romania's Beatrice Câșlaru, who shared the European title with Klochkova in the event, raced to silver with a national record of 2:12.57 on the rear of a dominant breaststroke leg. Meanwhile, U.S. swimmer Cristina Teuscher took home the bronze in 2:13.32 to touch out Canada's Marianne Limpert (2:13.44) by 12-hundredths of a second.

Limpert was followed in fifth by her teammate Joanne Malar (2:13.70) and in sixth by Russia's Oxana Verevka (2:13.88). Previously competed for Brazil in Atlanta four years earlier, Gabrielle Rose finished seventh in 2:14.82, while Japan's Tomoko Hagiwara rounded out the field with an eighth-place time of 2:15.64.

Notable swimmers missed out the top 8 final, featuring China's Chen Yan, who recorded the second fastest time ever in the event's history but faded badly to place ninth (2:15.27); and Australia's home favorite Elli Overton, who finished her semifinal run with an eleventh-place effort (2:15.74).

== Records ==
Prior to this competition, the existing world and Olympic records were as follows.

World record	Wu Yanyan (CHN)	2:09.72	Shanghai, China	17 October 1997
Olympic record	Lin Li (CHN)	2:11.65	Barcelona, Spain	30 July 1992

The following new world and Olympic records were set during this competition.

Date	Event	Name	Nationality	Time	Record
19 September	Final	Yana Klochkova	Ukraine	2:10.68	OR

== Results ==
=== Heats ===
Rank	Heat	Lane	Name	Nationality	Time	Notes
1	3	7	Oxana Verevka	Russia	2:13.48	Q, NR
2	4	4	Beatrice Câșlaru	Romania	2:13.72	Q
3	5	4	Yana Klochkova	Ukraine	2:13.83	Q
4	4	5	Joanne Malar	Canada	2:13.92	Q
5	5	5	Cristina Teuscher	United States	2:14.17	Q
6	4	3	Marianne Limpert	Canada	2:15.07	Q
7	3	4	Tomoko Hagiwara	Japan	2:15.16	Q
8	3	6	Gabrielle Rose	United States	2:15.55	Q
9	5	2	Chen Yan	China	2:16.01	Q
10	5	1	Federica Biscia	Italy	2:16.09	Q, NR
11	4	6	Sue Rolph	Great Britain	2:16.43	Q
12	4	8	Yseult Gervy	Belgium	2:16.51	Q
13	4	2	Zhan Shu	China	2:16.63	Q
14	5	3	Elli Overton	Australia	2:16.76	Q
15	3	3	Nicole Hetzer	Germany	2:16.98	Q
16	5	6	Sabine Herbst	Germany	2:17.18	Q
17	2	3	Hana Černá	Czech Republic	2:17.58	NR
18	3	8	Kirsty Coventry	Zimbabwe	2:17.73	AF
19	2	5	Alenka Kejžar	Slovenia	2:18.33	NR
20	3	1	Helen Norfolk	New Zealand	2:18.90	
21	5	8	Vered Borochovski	Israel	2:18.99	
22	2	4	Carolyn Adel	Suriname	2:19.17	
23	4	1	Joscelin Yeo	Singapore	2:19.18	
24	5	7	Kathryn Evans	Great Britain	2:19.41	
25	4	7	Anna Windsor	Australia	2:19.44	
26	3	2	Yasuko Tajima	Japan	2:21.65	
27	2	2	Nam Yoo-sun	South Korea	2:22.53	
28	1	3	Marina Mulyayeva	Kazakhstan	2:22.72	
29	2	1	María Virginia Garrone	Argentina	2:22.98	
30	2	6	Aikaterini Sarakatsani	Greece	2:23.05	
31	2	8	Sia Wai Yen	Malaysia	2:23.31	
32	1	5	Alexandra Zertsalova	Kyrgyzstan	2:24.09	
33	2	7	Smiljana Marinović	Croatia	2:25.24	
34	3	5	Diana Mocanu	Romania	2:29.58	
35	1	4	Meritxell Sabaté	Andorra	2:30.41	
36	1	6	Fernanda Cuadra	Nicaragua	2:38.25	

=== Semifinals ===
==== Semifinal 1 ====
Rank	Lane	Name	Nationality	Time	Notes
1	4	Beatrice Câșlaru	Romania	2:13.31	Q
2	5	Joanne Malar	Canada	2:13.59	Q
3	3	Marianne Limpert	Canada	2:13.90	Q
4	6	Gabrielle Rose	United States	2:14.40	Q
5	2	Federica Biscia	Italy	2:15.71	NR
6	1	Elli Overton	Australia	2:15.74	
7	7	Yseult Gervy	Belgium	2:17.19	
8	8	Sabine Herbst	Germany	2:17.51	

==== Semifinal 2 ====
Rank	Lane	Name	Nationality	Time	Notes
1	5	Yana Klochkova	Ukraine	2:13.08	Q
2	3	Cristina Teuscher	United States	2:13.47	Q
3	4	Oxana Verevka	Russia	2:14.04	Q
4	6	Tomoko Hagiwara	Japan	2:15.09	Q
5	2	Chen Yan	China	2:15.27	
6	7	Sue Rolph	Great Britain	2:15.98	
7	1	Zhan Shu	China	2:16.58	
8	8	Nicole Hetzer	Germany	2:18.08	

=== Final ===
Rank	Lane	Name	Nationality	Time	Notes
1st place, gold medalist(s)	4	Yana Klochkova	Ukraine	2:10.68	OR, ER
2nd place, silver medalist(s)	5	Beatrice Câșlaru	Romania	2:12.57	NR
3rd place, bronze medalist(s)	3	Cristina Teuscher	United States	2:13.32	
4	2	Marianne Limpert	Canada	2:13.44	
5	6	Joanne Malar	Canada	2:13.70	
6	7	Oxana Verevka	Russia	2:13.88	
7	1	Gabrielle Rose	United States	2:14.82	
8	8	Tomoko Hagiwara	Japan	2:15.64	
