= Amy Van Dyken =

American swimmer (born 1973)

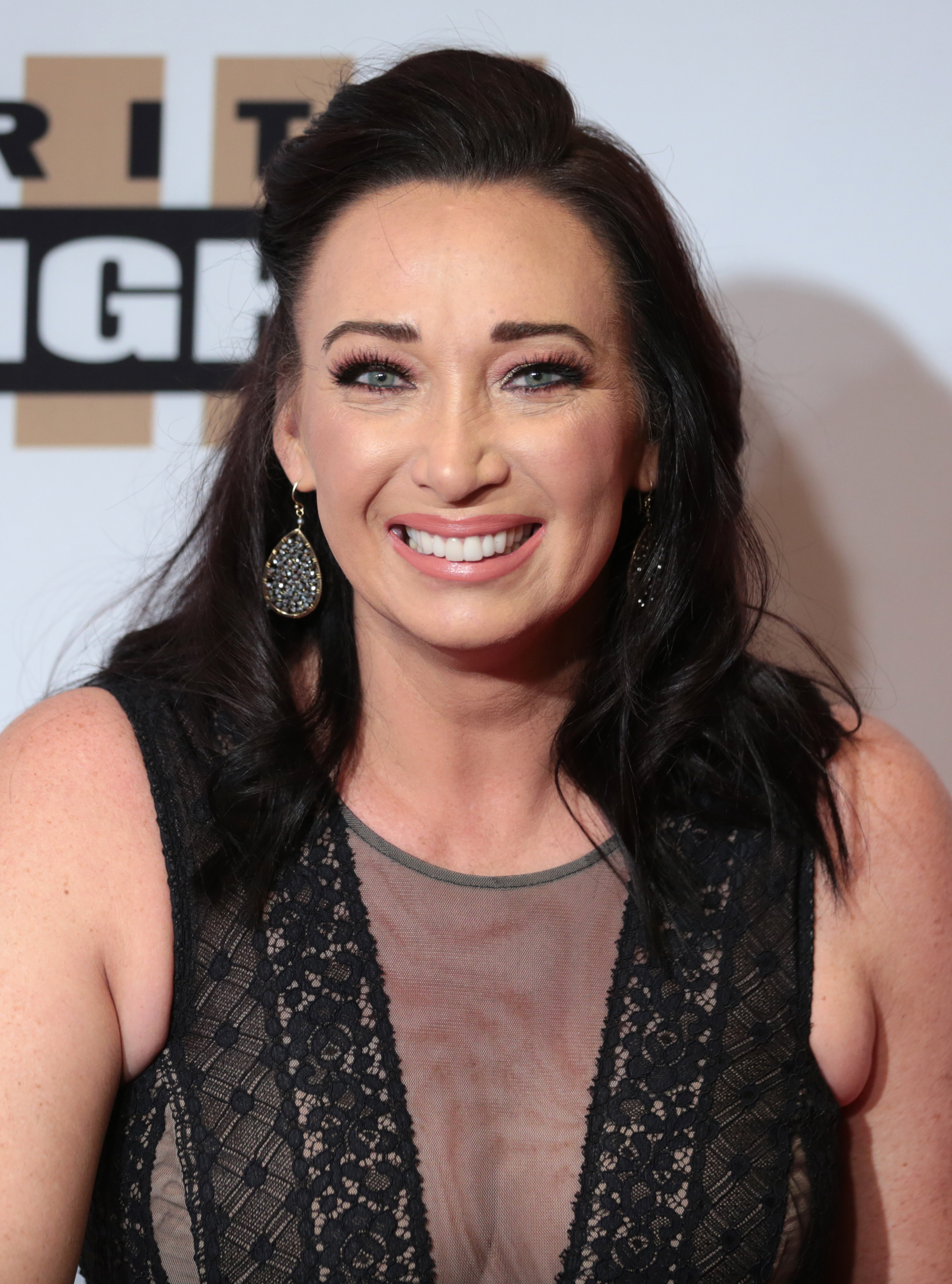
- Van Dyken in 2017

Personal information
- Full name: Amy Deloris Van Dyken-Rouen
- National team: United States
- Born: February 15, 1973 (age 53) Englewood, Colorado, U.S.
- Height: 6 ft 0 in (1.83 m)
- Weight: 163 lb (74 kg)

Sport
- Sport: Swimming
- Strokes: Butterfly, freestyle
- College team: University of Arizona; Colorado State University
- Coach: Jonty Skinner and John Mattos
Medal record
Women's swimming
Representing the United States
Olympic Games
Gold medal – first place	1996 Atlanta	50 m freestyle
Gold medal – first place	1996 Atlanta	100 m butterfly
Gold medal – first place	1996 Atlanta	4×100 m freestyle
Gold medal – first place	1996 Atlanta	4×100 m medley
Gold medal – first place	2000 Sydney	4×100 m freestyle
Gold medal – first place	2000 Sydney	4×100 m medley
World Championships (LC)
Gold medal – first place	1998 Perth	50 m freestyle
Gold medal – first place	1998 Perth	4×100 m freestyle
Gold medal – first place	1998 Perth	4×100 m medley
Silver medal – second place	1994 Rome	4×100 m medley
Silver medal – second place	1994 Rome	4×100 m freestyle
Bronze medal – third place	1994 Rome	50 m freestyle
Pan Pacific Championships
Gold medal – first place	1995 Atlanta	50 m freestyle
Gold medal – first place	1995 Atlanta	4×100 m freestyle
Silver medal – second place	1995 Atlanta	100 m freestyle
Silver medal – second place	1995 Atlanta	4×100 m medley
Pan American Games
Gold medal – first place	1995 Mar del Plata	100 m butterfly
Gold medal – first place	1995 Mar del Plata	4×100 m freestyle
Gold medal – first place	1995 Mar del Plata	4×100 m medley
Silver medal – second place	1995 Mar del Plata	100 m freestyle

Amy Deloris Van Dyken-Rouen (born February 15, 1973) is an American former competitive swimmer, Olympic champion, former world record-holder, and national radio sports talk show co-host. She won six Olympic gold medals in her career, four of which she won at the 1996 Summer Olympics, making her the first American woman to accomplish such a feat and the most successful athlete at the 1996 Summer Olympics. She won gold in the 50-meter freestyle, 100-meter butterfly, 4×100-meter freestyle relay, and 4×100-meter medley relay.

Van Dyken had severe asthma throughout her childhood and into adulthood. She began swimming on the advice of a doctor as a way to strengthen her lungs to cope with her condition and prevent future asthma attacks.

She was named Swimming World's American Swimmer of the Year in 1995 and 1996.

On June 6, 2014, Van Dyken was injured in a serious ATV accident that severed her spinal cord, leaving her paralyzed from the waist down.

== Early life ==
At the 1992 U.S. Olympic Trials, Van Dyken placed 4th in the 50-meter freestyle, just missing the Olympic team. After high school, Van Dyken attended the University of Arizona for two years before transferring to Colorado State University, where she broke her first (of many more to come) United States record with a time of 21.77 seconds in the 50-yard freestyle at the NCAA championships in 1994. She also placed second in the 100-yard butterfly and the 100-yard freestyle to Olympian Jenny Thompson. In 1994 she was named the NCAA Female Swimmer of the Year. After college, she moved to the United States Olympic Training Center in Colorado Springs, Colorado, to train full-time for the 1996 Olympics.

== Olympic competition ==
=== 1996 Summer Olympics ===
At the 1996 Summer Olympics in Atlanta, Georgia, Van Dyken became the first American female athlete to win 4 gold medals in a single Olympic games. Her success in swimming won her a wide variety of awards and accolades, including: the ESPN Awards (ESPY) Female Athlete of the Year award; Swimming World magazine's female Swimmer of the Year award; induction into the Colorado Sports Hall of Fame; induction into the US Olympic Hall of Fame; named Associated Press Female Athlete of the Year, USOC Sports Woman of the Year, the Women's Sports Foundation Sports Woman of the Year and USA Swimming Swimmer of the Year.

Van Dyken was also featured as one of Glamour magazine's Top 10 Women of the Year, named one of 25 most influential females in sport by Women's Sports and Fitness magazine and received the ARETE Courage in Sports award. She has appeared on the cover of several newspapers and magazines, including USA Today, Newsweek, Time, Swimming World magazine, and Sports Illustrated. She was a guest on the Late Show with David Letterman, The Rosie O'Donnell Show, and the Today Show.

=== 2000 Summer Olympics ===
Van Dyken continued to compete after the 1996 Olympics, but was plagued by injury, including a shoulder injury which required several operations and which left her unable to train for over a year. She staged a comeback, however, and made the 2000 U.S. Olympic Team in the 50-meter freestyle, the 4×100 medley relay and the 4×100 freestyle relay. At the 2000 Summer Olympics in Sydney, Australia, Van Dyken won two gold medals in these latter two events, and placed 4th in the 50-meter freestyle. This brought her total career Olympic medal count to six gold medals. In addition to her Olympic accomplishments, Van Dyken won several world titles and set numerous American and world records.

Van Dyken has the distinction of being one of the few Olympians whose medals are all gold.

Van Dyken lost public support when she spat in the lane of rival Inge de Bruijn at the 2000 Summer Olympics. After losing to de Bruijn, Van Dyken responded by saying she, too, could have won a gold medal "if I were a man."

== Life after swimming ==
Van Dyken retired from swimming after the 2000 Olympics and married former NFL punter Tom Rouen not long after. They split their time between Colorado and Arizona.

After retiring from swimming, Van Dyken announced that she was going to compete in triathlon. In 2001, Van Dyken finished a one-third-mile swim, 15.2-mile bike ride and 3.1-mile run Sunday in two hours, 10.5 seconds in the Saturn Triathlon in Monument, Colo., to place 28th among 34 women in the 25-to-29 age group. On August 9, 2001, Van Dyken completed the Danskin Women's Triathlon in Denver with a time of 1:38:11, 109 out of 349 in the female 25-29 age group.

In 2003, Van Dyken was called to testify before a grand jury regarding the Bay Area Laboratory Co-Operative (BALCO) steroid scandal. While Van Dyken was a regular client at BALCO, she has never tested positive for performance-enhancing drugs.

Since her retirement, Van Dyken has toured on a number of speaking engagements to groups as varied as schools and multi-national corporations, has been a disc jockey on a sports radio show in Arizona, served as the side-line reporter for the Seattle Seahawks and Denver Broncos football teams, and acted in the award-winning stage-play the Vagina Monologues. She is actively involved in a number of charities, including the Make-A-Wish Foundation, and along with husband Rouen runs an annual celebrity fundraiser in Evergreen, Colorado, to raise money for disadvantaged youth. She was the head coach of the varsity swim team at Notre Dame Preparatory High School in Scottsdale, Arizona. On May 12, she was the only American swimmer to be inducted into the International Swimming Hall of Fame's Class of 2007. She was inducted into the United States Olympic Hall of Fame in July 2008.

Van Dyken became the morning co-host at the #1 Ranked Mix 96.9 KMXP-FM in Phoenix, Arizona in July 2008 where she joined host Chris Parker. Eventually she and Parker moved over to rival KPKX-FM where she was morning drive-time host on 98.7 The Peak FM as a part of "Chris and Amy in the Morning" from 2010 to 2011. She resigned from 98.7 The Peak FM on July 12, 2011, to "attend to some family issues that are going to take her back to Denver." She was the co-host of Fox Sports Radio's Fox Sports Tonight with Rob Dibble until December 2013.

== ATV accident ==
On June 6, 2014, Van Dyken was in a serious ATV accident and severed her spinal cord at the T11 vertebra. She was conscious when rescued and airlifted to a hospital where she had emergency surgery to stabilize her spinal cord and vertebral column. The injury to the area came within millimeters of impacting and potentially rupturing her aorta. However, the accident left her paralyzed from the waist down.

After two months of rehabilitation, Van Dyken left Craig Hospital in Englewood, Colorado, saying, "I'm a better person than before the injury," and with the help of a walker and an apparent bionic device that aids her legs, took her first steps.

== See also ==
- List of multiple Olympic gold medalists
- List of multiple Olympic gold medalists at a single Games
- List of Olympic medalists in swimming (women)
- List of World Aquatics Championships medalists in swimming (women)
- World record progression 50 metres butterfly
- World record progression 4 × 100 metres freestyle relay

Records
Preceded by –	Women's 50-meter butterfly world record holder (short course); February 1, 1995 – February 12, 1995	Succeeded by Angela Kennedy
Awards
Preceded by Allison Wagner	Swimming World; American Swimmer of the Year; 1995–1996	Succeeded by Kristine Quance
