= Swimming at the 1991 Pan American Games – Women's 800 metre freestyle =

Women's 800 metre freestyle at the 1991 Pan American Games
- Venue: -
- Dates: August 17 (preliminaries and finals)
- Competitors: from - nations

Medalists
Gold medal	Jane Skillman	United States
Silver medal	Lisa Jacob	United States
Bronze medal	Tara Seymour	Canada

The women's 800 metre freestyle competition of the swimming events at the 1991 Pan American Games took place on 17 August. The last Pan American Games champion was Tami Bruce of US.

This race consisted of sixteen lengths of the pool, all in freestyle.

== Results ==
All times are in minutes and seconds.

KEY:	q	Fastest non-qualifiers	Q	Qualified	GR	Games record	NR	National record	PB	Personal best	SB	Seasonal best

=== Final ===
The final was held on August 17.

Rank	Name	Nationality	Time	Notes
1st place, gold medalist(s)	Jane Skillman	United States	8:43.26	
2nd place, silver medalist(s)	Lisa Jacob	United States	8:51.36	
3rd place, bronze medalist(s)	Tara Seymour	Canada	8:52.33	
4	Stephanie Shewchuk	Canada	9:01.05	
5	Viviane Motti	Brazil	9:04.71	
6	Maria Marenco	El Salvador	9:10.64	
7	Alicia Barrancos	Argentina	9:13.80	
8	Daniela Naya	Venezuela	9:20.04	
