= Barbara Bedford =

Barbara Bedford may refer to:

- Barbara Bedford (actress) (1903–1981), American actress
- Barbara Bedford (swimmer) (born 1972), American former backstroke swimmer
