= Brooke Bennett =

American swimmer (born 1980)

Personal information
- Full name: Brooke Marie Bennett
- National team: United States
- Born: May 6, 1980 (age 46) Tampa, Florida, U.S.
- Height: 5 ft 5 in (1.65 m)
- Weight: 126 lb (57 kg)

Sport
- Sport: Swimming
- Strokes: Freestyle
- Club: Brandon Blue Wave
Medal record
Women's swimming
Representing the United States
Olympic Games
Gold medal – first place	1996 Atlanta	800 m freestyle
Gold medal – first place	2000 Sydney	400 m freestyle
Gold medal – first place	2000 Sydney	800 m freestyle
World Championships (LC)
Gold medal – first place	1998 Perth	800 m freestyle
Silver medal – second place	1998 Perth	400 m freestyle
Silver medal – second place	1998 Perth	4×200 m freestyle
Bronze medal – third place	1994 Rome	800 m freestyle
World Championships (SC)
Silver medal – second place	2000 Athens	800 m freestyle
Silver medal – second place	2000 Athens	4×200 m freestyle
Pan Pacific Championships
Gold medal – first place	1995 Atlanta	400 m freestyle
Gold medal – first place	1995 Atlanta	1500 m freestyle
Gold medal – first place	1997 Fukuoka	800 m freestyle
Gold medal – first place	1997 Fukuoka	1500 m freestyle
Gold medal – first place	1999 Sydney	400 m freestyle
Gold medal – first place	1999 Sydney	800 m freestyle
Silver medal – second place	1995 Atlanta	800 m freestyle
Silver medal – second place	1997 Fukuoka	400 m freestyle
Pan American Games
Gold medal – first place	1995 Mar del Plata	400 m freestyle
Silver medal – second place	1995 Mar del Plata	800 m freestyle

Brooke Marie Bennett (born May 6, 1980) is an American former competition swimmer and three-time Olympic champion.

== Swimming career ==
=== 1996 Summer Olympics ===
Bennett's first gold medal came in the 800-meter freestyle race at the 1996 Summer Olympics in Atlanta, Georgia. This accomplishment, coming days after her grandfather died, was overshadowed by the fact that this was the last Olympic race in the career of swimming legend Janet Evans.

=== 1998 World Aquatics Championships ===
A new rival emerged for Bennett in the 800-meter freestyle, teammate Diane Munz who had beaten her in two separate races the past couple years. However, Bennett led from the start and held off Munz's late finishing charge to win the 800-meter freestyle gold. She also led the 400-meter freestyle most of the way, but was passed at the end by a swimmer of the controversial Chinese women's team, finishing with silver.

=== 2000 Summer Olympics ===
At the 2000 Summer Olympics Brooke hit the peak of her swimming career. She won two more gold medals in the 400- and 800-meter freestyle races, with the latter coming in Olympic record time. In the 400-meter freestyle she defeated a strong field that included her teammate Diana Munz who had beaten her at the U.S. Olympic trials, the 1996 Olympic 200 freestyle champion Claudia Poll, and that year's fastest performer, Hannah Stockbauer. Bennett's time was the fastest in the event in nine years.

In the 800-meter freestyle Bennett again faced competition from 200- and 400-meter medley Olympic winner Yana Klochkova, and Kaitlin Sandeno who had pulled a major upset in denying Diana Munz a place in the 800-meter freestyle at the U.S. Olympic trials. Bennett led from the start, swam an aggressive and steady race, and won commandingly in the fastest 800-meter freestyle time in 10 years.

=== Post 2000 Olympics ===
Her attempt for a third straight Olympic appearance fell short in 2004, following operations on both of her shoulders in 2001. She finished third in the 800-meter freestyle (with only the top two finishers qualify for the Olympic Team).

== See also ==
- Swimming at the 1996 Summer Olympics
- Swimming at the 2000 Summer Olympics
- List of multiple Olympic gold medalists
- List of Olympic medalists in swimming (women)
- List of World Aquatics Championships medalists in swimming (women)

Awards
Preceded by Jenny Thompson	Swimming World; American Swimmer of the Year; 2000	Succeeded by Natalie Coughlin
