= Swimming at the 1991 Pan American Games – Women's 4 × 100 metre medley relay =

Women's 4 × 100 metre medley relay at the 1991 Pan American Games
- Venue: -
- Dates: August 17 (preliminaries and finals)
- Competitors: from - nations

Medalists
| Gold medal | Jodi Wilson, Dorsey Tierney, Angie Wester-Krieg and Ashley Tappin | United States |
| Silver medal | Ana Azevedo, Glicia Lofego, Paoletti Filippini and Celina Endo | Brazil |
| Bronze medal | -, -, - and - | Mexico |

The women's 4 × 100 metre medley relay competition of the swimming events at the 1991 Pan American Games took place on 17 August. The last Pan American Games champion was the United States.

== Results ==
All times are in minutes and seconds.

| KEY: | q | Fastest non-qualifiers | Q | Qualified | GR | Games record | NR | National record | PB | Personal best | SB | Seasonal best |

=== Final ===
The final was held on August 17.

| Rank | Name | Nationality | Time | Notes |
|---|---|---|---|---|
| 1st place, gold medalist(s) | Jodi Wilson; Dorsey Tierney; Angie Wester-Krieg; Ashley Tappin | United States | 4:12.51 | GR |
| 2nd place, silver medalist(s) | Ana Azevedo; Glicia Lofego; Paoletti Filippini; Celina Endo | Brazil | 4:23.45 | |
| 3rd place, bronze medalist(s) | - - - - | Mexico | 4:25.94 | |
| 4 | - - - - | Puerto Rico | 4:30.65 | |
| 5 | - - - - | Argentina | 4:38.94 | |
| 6 | - - - - | Canada | DQ | |
| 7 | - - - - | - | - | |
| 8 | - - - - | - | - | |
