= Nataliya Sorokina =

Russian swimmer

Personal information
- Born: 7 June 1976 (age 48)

Sport
- Sport: Swimming

Nataliya Sorokina (born 7 June 1976) is a Russian swimmer. She competed in the women's 4 × 100 metre freestyle relay event at the 1996 Summer Olympics.
