= Swimming at the 1991 Pan American Games – Women's 200 metre freestyle =

Women's 200 metre freestyle at the 1991 Pan American Games
- Venue: -
- Dates: August 13 (preliminaries and finals)
- Competitors: from - nations

Medalists
Gold medal	Lisa Jacob	United States
Silver medal	Barbara Metz	United States
Bronze medal	Kim Paton	Canada

The women's 200 metre freestyle competition of the swimming events at the 1991 Pan American Games took place on 13 August. The last Pan American Games champion was Silvia Poll of Costa Rica.

This race consisted of four lengths of the pool, all in freestyle.

== Results ==
All times are in minutes and seconds.

KEY:	q	Fastest non-qualifiers	Q	Qualified	GR	Games record	NR	National record	PB	Personal best	SB	Seasonal best

=== Final ===
The final was held on August 13.

Rank	Name	Nationality	Time	Notes
1st place, gold medalist(s)	Lisa Jacob	United States	2:02.06	
2nd place, silver medalist(s)	Barbara Metz	United States	2:02.92	
3rd place, bronze medalist(s)	Kim Paton	Canada	2:04.73	
4	Paolette Filippini	Brazil	2:05.26	
5	Rita Garay	Puerto Rico	2:06.01	
6	Tara Seymour	Canada	2:06.76	
7	Laura Sánchez	Mexico	2:07.10	
8	Rachel Brinn	Jamaica	2:10.65	
