= Melanie Valerio =

American swimmer (born 1969)

Personal information
- Full name: Melanie M. Valerio -Thomas
- National team: United States
- Born: May 7, 1969 (age 57) Cleveland, Ohio, U.S.
- Education: MA Exercise Physiology (2000) (University of Virginia)
- Occupations: Fitness Trainer, Swim Coach; Pharmaceutical testing
- Height: 6 ft 0 in (1.83 m)
- Weight: 146 lb (66 kg)

Sport
- Sport: Swimming
- Events: 100, 200 freestyle 4x100, 4x200 freestyle relay
- Strokes: Freestyle
- Club: Lake Erie Silver Dolphins (LESD); Mission Bay Swim Club, Boca 1992; Ft. Lauderdale Swim Team 92-93; Hilldenbrand Aquatics, Tucson 94-95
- College team: University of Virginia (1987-91)
- Coach: Jerry Holtrey (LESD, Hawken School); Jim Kehoe (U. Virginia); Mariusz Podkoscielny, (Hilldenbrand); Frank Busch (Hilldenbrand)
Medal record
Women's swimming
Representing the United States
Olympic Games
Gold medal – first place	1996 Atlanta	4x100 m freestyle
World Championships (LC)
Gold medal – first place	1998 Perth	4×100 m freestyle
Pan Pacific Championships
Gold medal – first place	1993 Kobe	4x100 m freestyle
Gold medal – first place	1995 Atlanta	4x100 m freestyle
Gold medal – first place	1995 Atlanta	4x200 m freestyle
Gold medal – first place	1997 Fukuoka	4x100 m freestyle

Melanie M. Valerio (born May 7, 1969), also known in some media beginning in the late 1990's as Melanie Valerio Thomas is an American former competition swimmer who competed for the University of Virginia and was a 1996 Atlanta Olympic gold medalist in the 4x100-meter freestyle relay. A strong performer in international meets, between 1993-1997 she captured four freestyle relay gold medals at the Pan Pacific Championships and won a fifth gold in the world championships in Perth, Australia in 1998. Utilizing her 2000 Masters in Exercise Physiology from Virginia in her professional career, she has worked as a swim coach, fitness trainer, and in the field of pharmaceutical testing.

== Early swimming ==
Valerio was born in greater Cleveland, Ohio on May 7, 1969. She swam with a competitive club by five, and in early competition at the age of 12, she represented the Penguin Aquatic Club in the 11-12 age group at the Friendly House Annual Swim Meet, where she swam a 27.002 in the 50 freestyle, a 58.026 in the 100 freestyle, and a 29.741 in the 50 butterfly. She later graduated in 1987 from the Hawken School, a private co-educational prep school in Gates Mills, Ohio, about 18 miles East of Cleveland. In club swimming, Valerio competed and trained with the Lake Erie Silver Dolphins, which finished ninth place in the National Junior Olympics in 1984. The Silver Dolphins were affiliated with the Hawken School. Coach Jerry Holtrey, who also coached the Silver Dolphins, led the Hawken Women's team to the Ohio State Swimming and Diving team Championships in 1984, 1985, 1986, and 1987, during Valerio's time with the team. Holtrey, an American Swimming Coaches Hall of Fame inductee, coached the state-wide power Hawken swim team from 1969-2014, started the women's team in 1981, and led the men's and women's teams to a combined 26 state titles, of which 24 were won by the Hawken women. In her fourth and final team state championship win in 1987, Valerio won the 200-yard freestyle with a time of 1:49.72, and placed second in the 100-yard freestyle with a time of 51.16.

At the North-Northeast Ohio District Swimming Championships in February 1985, representing the Hawken School as a Sophomore, Melanie won the 50-yard freestyle with a time of 23.92, and the 100-yard freestyle with a time of 52.33 Earning titles at the 1985 Ohio State Championships, Valerio placed third in the 100 freestyle with a 51.52, and swam anchor in the 4x100 freestyle relay with a team time of 3:32.57, a state meet record.

== University of Virginia ==
After High School, she attended the University of Virginia in Charlottesville on a full scholarship, where she swam for the Virginia Cavaliers swimming and diving team under accomplished coach Frank Kehoe, graduating in 1991. Around her Freshman year at Virginia, Valerio qualified for and attended the August, 1988 Swimming trails in Austin, but did not make the finals. Excelling nonetheless in her collegiate career, she captured a total of seven titles in Atlantic Coast Conference competition. Diverse in her contributions to Virginia, she earned All American honors during her collegiate swimming career in six events, with a total of 15 All-American titles and served as team captain for the 1990-91 school year. With Valerio's participation in the 1990 swimming season, the Virginia women' swimming team won the Atlantic Coast Conference team championship for the first time. In appreciation of her achievements, Valerio received the Most Valuable Player award as a Virginia Women's swimmer in both 1989 and 1990.

After completing her 1991 Bachelor's degree, she later earned a Master's in Exercise Physiology from Virginia in 2000.

== Post-collegiate era ==
After graduating Virginia in 1991, from around 1992-1993, Valerio relocated to Florida. She trained and competed first with the Mission Bay Makos in Boca, coached by Tom Popdan at the time, though the team was winding down, and disbanded by 1993. She had been slated to coach Mission Bay's Age Group swimmers in September 1992, but it became a short term assignment. By 1993, Valerio swam with the Fort Lauderdale Swim Team under Head Coach Jack Nelson.

Interrupting her training in Florida, Valerio qualified for and attended the early March, 1992 U.S. Olympic time trials in Indianapolis after graduating the University of Virginia, but didn't make the finals, or come close to qualifying. She placed 17th in the 200 freestyle with a time of 2:04.14. She considered retiring from swimming, and took some time off from elite training.

Moving to Arizona in 1994, she represented Hillenbrand Aquatics swimming at the University of Arizona Hillenbrand Aquatic Center in Tucson, training under accomplished Hillenbrand Head Coach Frank Busch, who also coached the University of Arizona, and sprint coach Mariusz Podkoscielny. She also worked with former 1972 Olympian and Hillenbrand Coach Rick DeMont. Working long hours in the 1995-6 years in preparation for the 1996 Atlanta Olympics, she was an Assistant Swim Coach at Arizona, attended exhausting practices at the Hillenbrand Center and would eventually become the second oldest member of the 1996 U.S. Olympic women's team.

== 1996 Atlanta Olympic gold ==
At the age of 26, at the March 6, 1996 Olympic trials in Indianapolis, Valerio placed fourth in the 100-meter freestyle with a time of 55.97, close to a personal best, qualifying her for the U.S. Women's Olympic 4x100-meter freestyle relay team, and other relays which had a freestyle leg. She also swam in trials of the 50 and 200-meter freestyle. In the preliminaries of the 50-meter freestyle, she finished in a personal best time of 26.45, only 8 hundredths of a second from the second place finisher who made the finals.

At the 1996 Summer Olympics in Atlanta, Georgia, on July 22, at 27, Valerio earned a gold medal by swimming the anchor leg for the winning U.S. team in the preliminary heats of the women's 4×100-meter freestyle relay. She swam the anchor leg in Preliminary Heat 2 with lead-off American team swimmer Jenny Thompson, followed by Americans Catherine Fox and Lisa Jacob. Valerio completed her leg in a time of 55.98, very close to her personal best, and her preliminary team recorded a combined team time of 3:42.36. Later, the American women's 4x100 free relay team swam a combined time of 3:39.29 to take the gold medal. She became the first woman from the University of Virginia to earn an Olympic gold medal. In preparation for the 1996 Olympics, Valerio trained briefly with Richard Quick, the Women's coach at Stanford University, and was managed at the Atlanta Olympics by Quick, the 1996 U.S. Olympic Women's Head Coach. Valerio expressed some minor disappointment in not being chosen to swim in the 4x100-meter medley relay, or the 4x200 meter freestyle relay, for which she could have been chosen, though she was aware that her times were not among the team's fastest. After the Olympics, Valerio planned to continue her swim training, but also planned to take up triathlon.

=== International competition highlights ===
In international competition, Valerio won gold in the 4x100 freestyle relay at the World Championships in Perth in 1998. In more notable international achievements, between 1993-1997, she captured four freestyle relay gold medals at the Pan Pacific Championships. At the August 14, 1993 Pan Pacific Championships in Kobe, Japan, Valerio swam with the team of Nicole Haislett, Angel Martino, and Jenny Thompson, and took the gold medal in the 4x100 freestyle relay in a time of 3:42.56, a meet record. The American Women took seven of eight events. Shortly after her 1996 Olympic gold, Valerio became the first swimmer to be sponsored by Nike, and served as a spokesperson and model.

=== 2000 Olympic Trials ===
Valerio qualified to compete at the 2000 Olympic swimming trials in Indianapolis, Indiana, and finished ninth in the 100-meter swim event, just missing the finals.

=== Later life ===
Melanie has competed in United States Masters Swimming, primarily in freestyle events from 2005-2021, between the ages of 35-43, though she competed in a more recent race at the age of 52. Valerio has raced Ironman as a highly competitive age-group member of the Timex Multisport Team, and has served as a Timex instructor director for fitness. She has blogged her races and training for Timex on the website, .

Relocating to Phoenix, Arizona in August, 2002, she worked performing clinical trials for drug companies looking for approval from the FDA. In 2002, Valerio began training as a marathon competitor.

Continuing to attended swim practices into middle age, at the age of 47, having trained at the University of Southern California under Head Coach Dave Salo, Valerio nearly qualified for the 2016 Olympic trials.

=== Honors ===
For her performance in the 200-yard freestyle, she became a member of the Cleveland Plain Dealer's All-Scholastic Swim team in March 1987, after the Hawken school won their third successive team state championship. During her time swimming for the University of Virginia, Valerio was an Atlantic Coast Conference Swimmer of the year in 1990. In 2014, she was inducted into the Hawken High School Hall of Fame.

== See also ==
- List of Olympic medalists in swimming (women)
- List of University of Virginia people
