= Lara Preacco =

Swiss swimmer (born 1971)

Personal information
- Born: 10 May 1971 (age 53)

Sport
- Sport: Swimming

Lara Preacco (born 10 May 1971) is a Swiss swimmer. She competed in the women's 4 × 100 metre freestyle relay event at the 1996 Summer Olympics. Preacco is now the head coach for the Florida Atlantic University swimming and diving team.

Prior to coaching the Florida Atlantic team, Preacco set five Swiss national records and captured 38 gold medals while competing at the Swiss National Championships from 1983 to 1997. Preacco swam for the FAU Owls from 1994 to 1998. She represented both FAU and her home country of Switzerland at the 1996 Olympic Games in Atlanta, and was inducted into the FAU Athletics Hall of Fame in 2010. Preacco also earned Honorable Mention in the All-American Scholar Excellence rankings, while placing on the FAU Dean's List four times and President's List three times.
