= Swimming at the 1987 Pan American Games – Women's 4 × 100 metre medley relay =

Women's 4 × 100 metre medley relay at the 1987 Pan American Games
- Venue: Indiana University Natatorium
- Dates: August 14 (preliminaries and finals)
- Competitors: from - nations

Medalists
Gold medal	Holly Green, Lori Heisick, Janel Jorgensen and Sara Linke	United States
Silver medal	-, -, - and -	Canada
Bronze medal	-, -, - and -	Costa Rica

The women's 4 × 100 metre medley relay competition of the swimming events at the 1987 Pan American Games took place on 14 August at the Indiana University Natatorium. The last Pan American Games champion was the United States.

== Results ==
All times are in minutes and seconds.

KEY:	q	Fastest non-qualifiers	Q	Qualified	GR	Games record	NR	National record	PB	Personal best	SB	Seasonal best

=== Final ===
The final was held on August 14.

Rank	Name	Nationality	Time	Notes
1st place, gold medalist(s)	Holly Green (1:03.11); Lori Heisick (1:11.84); Janel Jorgensen (1:00.75); Sara Linke (57.22)	United States	4:12.92	GR
2nd place, silver medalist(s)	- - - -	Canada	4:17.78	
3rd place, bronze medalist(s)	Silvia Poll (1:01.86) NR - - -	Costa Rica	4:23.11	
4	- - - -	Brazil	4:27.46	
5	- - - -	Puerto Rico	4:31.34	
6	- - - -	Argentina	DQ	
7	- - - -	-	-	
8	- - - -	-	-	
