= Susana Garabatos =

Spanish swimmer (born 1979)

Personal information
- Born: 8 March 1979 (age 47) Vigo, Pontevedra, Spain

Sport
- Sport: Swimming

Susana Garabatos Rodríguez (born 8 March 1979) is a former freestyle swimmer from Spain, who competed for her native country at the 1996 Summer Olympics in Atlanta, Georgia. There she was eliminated in the qualifying heats of the 4x100m Freestyle Relay, alongside Blanca Cerón, Fátima Madrid, and Claudia Franco
