= Swimming at the 1991 Pan American Games – Women's 4 × 100 metre freestyle relay =

Women's 4 × 100 metre freestyle relay at the 1991 Pan American Games
- Venue: –
- Dates: August 14 (preliminaries and finals)
- Competitors: – from – nations

Medalists
| Gold medal | Megan Oesting, Suzy Buckovich, Lisa Jacob and Ashley Tappin | United States |
| Silver medal | -, -, – and – | Canada |
| Bronze medal | Isabelle Vieira, Paula Marsiglia, Paula Renata Aguiar and Paoletti Filippini | Brazil |

The women's 4 × 100 metre freestyle relay competition of the swimming events at the 1991 Pan American Games took place on 14 August. The last Pan American Games champion was the United States.

This race consisted of eight lengths of the pool. Each of the four swimmers completed two lengths of the pool. The first swimmer had to touch the wall before the second could leave the starting block.

== Results ==
All times are in minutes and seconds.

| KEY: | q | Fastest non-qualifiers | Q | Qualified | GR | Games record | NR | National record | PB | Personal best | SB | Seasonal best |

=== Final ===
The final was held on August 14.

| Rank | Name | Nationality | Time | Notes |
|---|---|---|---|---|
| 1st place, gold medalist(s) | Megan Oesting; Suzy Buckovich; Lisa Jacob; Ashley Tappin | United States | 3:48.88 | |
| 2nd place, silver medalist(s) | – – – – | Canada | 3:52.29 | |
| 3rd place, bronze medalist(s) | Isabelle Vieira; Paula Marsiglia; Paula Renata Aguiar; Paoletti Filippini | Brazil | 3:52.92 | |
| 4 | – – – – | Mexico | 3:57.63 | |
| 5 | – – – – | Puerto Rico | 4:01.07 | |
| 6 | – – – – | Argentina | DQ | |
| 7 | – – – – | – | – | |
| 8 | – – – – | – | – | |
