= Carrie Willmott =

British swimmer

Personal information
- Born: 8 June 1975 (age 50) Luton, England

Sport
- Sport: Swimming

Carrie Willmott (born 8 June 1975) is a British swimmer. She competed in the women's 4 × 100 metre freestyle relay event at the 1996 Summer Olympics.
