= Fernanda Cuadra =

Nicaraguan swimmer (born 1984)

Fernanda Cuadra Bølgen
Personal information
- Full name: Fernanda Cuadra Bølgen (Fernanda Cuadra Delgado)
- National team: Nicaragua
- Born: 7 September 1984 (age 41) Managua, Nicaragua
- Height: 1.77 m (5 ft 10 in)
- Weight: 58 kg (128 lb)

Sport
- Sport: Swimming
- Strokes: Individual medley

Fernanda Cuadra Bølgen (Fernanda Cuadra Delgado) (born September 7, 1984) is a Nicaraguan former swimmer, who specialized in individual medley events. Cuadra qualified for the Summer Olympics as a 15-year-old and swam for Nicaragua in the women's 200 m individual medley at the 2000 Summer Olympics in [Sydney]. Cuadra did not advance into the semifinals.
