= Fátima Madrid =

Spanish swimmer

Personal information
- Full name: Fátima Madrid Calancha
- Born: 28 December 1979 (age 46) Seville, Andalusia

Sport
- Sport: Swimming
- Club: Club Natación Los Palacios
Medal record
Representing Spain
Mediterranean Games
Gold medal – first place	1997 Bari	4x100m freestyle relay

Fátima Madrid Calancha (born 28 December 1979) is a coach and a former freestyle swimmer from Spain.

== Career ==
Madrid competed for Spain at the 1996 Summer Olympics in Atlanta, Georgia. She was eliminated in the qualifying heats of the 4 × 100 m Freestyle Relay with her teammates Blanca Cerón, Susanna Garabatos and Claudia Franco. A year later, the Spanish relay team including Cerón, Madrid, Ana Belén Palomo and Franco finished first at the Mediterranean Games.

She was a member of the swimming club Club Natación Los Palacios in Seville. In 2000, she started a new career as a personal coach and, in 2010, she published a book on health and prevention.

== Bibliography ==
- Fátima Madrid Calancha, En salud, más prevenir que curar. Guía práctica para un bienestar físico y sobrevivir al S.XXI. Publicaciones Vértice SL, 2010, 90 p., ISBN 978-84-9931-062-6
