= Swimming at the 1995 Pan American Games – Women's 200 metre backstroke =

Women's 200 metre backstroke at the 1995 Pan American Games
- Venue: Complejo Natatorio
- Dates: between March 12–17 (preliminaries and finals)
- Competitors: from - nations

Medalists
Gold medal	Barbara Bedford	United States
Silver medal	Rachel Joseph	United States
Bronze medal	Joanne Malar	Canada

The women's 200 metre backstroke competition of the swimming events at the 1995 Pan American Games took place between March 12–17 at the Complejo Natatorio. The last Pan American Games champion was Diana Trimble of US.

This race consisted of four lengths of the pool, all in backstroke.

== Results ==
All times are in minutes and seconds.

KEY:	q	Fastest non-qualifiers	Q	Qualified	GR	Games record	NR	National record	PB	Personal best	SB	Seasonal best

=== Final ===
The final was held between March 12–17.

Rank	Name	Nationality	Time	Notes
1st place, gold medalist(s)	Barbara Bedford	United States	2:12.98	GR
2nd place, silver medalist(s)	Rachel Joseph	United States	2:14.74	
3rd place, bronze medalist(s)	Joanne Malar	Canada	2:16.67	
4	Fabíola Molina	Brazil	2:18.71	
5	Valeria Alvarez	Argentina	2:24.52	
6	Natalia Scapinello	Argentina	2:28.16	
7	-	-	-	
8	-	-	-	
