= Florida Atlantic Owls swimming and diving =

American swim team

Florida Atlantic Swim and Dive
- Location: Florida Atlantic University, Boca Raton, Florida
- Colors: Red, blue, white
- Website: fausports.com/sports/swimming-and-diving

The Florida Atlantic Owls Swim and Dive program represents Florida Atlantic University (FAU) in the sport of swimming and diving. The team practices at the FAU Aquatic Center, an Olympic-sized meter pool in the heart of Boca Raton, Florida. Although they practice together, the men's team competes at the Atlantic Sun Conference Championships, while the women's team competes at the American Athletic Conference Championships.

== Coaching staff ==
The Florida Atlantic Owls Swim and Dive Team has been headed up by coach Lara Preacco, a Swiss ex-Olympian, since 2014. In the 2021–22 season, Preacco led the Owls to a second-place finish on the men's side in the Coastal Collegiate Sports Association Championships with 903.5 points. In the conference championships, Preacco guided Rateb Hussein to Most Outstanding Diver of the Meet honors, while Timo Paisley earned Most Outstanding Freshman of the Meet honors.

== Notable FAU Swim and Dive Athletes ==
Alicia Mora dove for Florida Atlantic University from 2021 to 2024. Mora is the first Owl in program history to make the NCAAs for two consecutive seasons. She concluded her collegiate career at the 2024 NCAA Diving Championships, earning 30th place with a score of 267.50 on the 3-meter and posting a mark of 250.00 on the 1-meter to finish in 32nd place.

Although Lara Preacco now coaches for the FAU owls, Preacco also swam for the FAU Owls from 1994 to 1998. Preacco set five Swiss national records and captured 38 gold medals while competing at the Swiss National Championships from 1983 to 1997. Preacco represented both FAU and her home country of Switzerland at the 1996 Olympic Games in Atlanta, and was inducted into the FAU Athletics Hall of Fame in 2010.

Joshua McQueen swam for Florida Atlantic University from 2018 to 2020. McQueen was recruited after breaking the nearly 20 year old Saint Petersburg city record for the 200 yard freestyle. The same day, McQueen also broke the record for the 500 yard freestyle.

Rateb Hussein (Ahmed Khaled Rateb Youssef Hussein) is a Florida Atlantic Swim and Dive record holder in the 100 fly (47.31) and 200 fly (1:45.74) and 400 medley relay (3:14.36). He was recruited by FAU after receiving a number of accolades, such as a gold medal in the 100 Fly at the 2018 Youth African Games, the Best Swimmer in Africa (14 year old age group), and the record holder in the 200 Free in Africa (15 year old age group).

Béla Szabados (born February 18, 1974, in Békéscsaba) is a former freestyle swimmer from Hungary, who competed in two consecutive Summer Olympics for his native country, starting in 1992. He swim for Florida Atlantic University in 1996, winning the NCAA in the 200Free, but later transferred to swim at the University of Southern California. Szabados continues to compete as a Masters swimmer, representing West Loop Athletic Club in Chicago, IL. He has set two Illinois Masters Swimming records in the 35-39 age group.

Matthieu Burtez competed for FAU from 2012 to 2016. He currently holds the record for the 50 and 100 freestyle, at 19.69 and 43.48 respectively.
