= Angela Kennedy =

Australian swimmer

Personal information
- Full name: Angela Kennedy
- National team: Australia
- Born: 28 February 1976 (age 50) Nambour, Queensland
- Weight: 58 kg (128 lb)

Sport
- Sport: Swimming
- Strokes: Butterfly, freestyle
- Club: Commercial Swim Club
Medal record
Women's swimming
Representing Australia
Olympic Games
Silver medal – second place	1996 Atlanta	4×100 m medley
World Championships (LC)
Bronze medal – third place	1998 Perth	4×100 m freestyle
World Championships (SC)
Gold medal – first place	1995 Rio de Janeiro	4×100 m medley
Bronze medal – third place	1995 Rio de Janeiro	100 m butterfly
Bronze medal – third place	1997 Gothenburg	4×100 m medley

Angela Kennedy (born 28 February 1976) is an Australian former butterfly swimmer of the 1990s, who won a silver medal in the 4×100-metre medley relay at the 1996 Summer Olympics in Atlanta, Georgia.

== Swimming career ==
In 1994, Kennedy attended the NSW State Open Short-Course Championships in Sydney. She set a record in every 50m and 100m event in the program, achieving 11 records in total.

Kennedy broke the world record in the 100m butterfly at the World Short-Course Swimming Championships in 1995, however was beaten in the event by fellow Australian Susie O'Neill (who took silver), and Liu Limin of China (who won gold).

She swam for most of her career at the Telopea Swimming Club in Canberra, Australia under the direction of former Australian butterfly coach Peter Freney. She was teammates to Australian representative and University of Nevada scholarship holder Anthony Rogis, Australian representative Chloe Flutter and Syracuse University scholarship holders Francis Williams and Ben Henri. She moved to Queensland in 1995 and was then coached by Scott Volkers.

=== 1996 Olympics ===
She combined with Helen Denman, Sarah Ryan and Nicole Stevenson to qualify Australia for the final, before Susie O'Neill, Samantha Riley, Stevenson and Ryan trailed the United States home. In her only individual event, the 100-metre butterfly, Kennedy was eliminated in the heats.

=== 2000 Olympics ===
She attempted to qualify for the 2000 Summer Olympics in Sydney, but finished eighth in the 100-metre butterfly at the Australian Championships. Petria Thomas and Susie O'Neill were selected. Her attempt in the 200-metre individual medley was even less successful, failing to reach the final.

In 2007, Kennedy started working for the Queensland Police Force.

== Personal life ==
Kennedy was born to Bob and Helen Kennedy on 28 February 1976 in Nambour, Queensland. Later, she lived in Queanbeyan, New South Wales, where she attended school.

== See also ==
- List of Olympic medalists in swimming (women)
- World record progression 50 metres butterfly
- World record progression 100 metres butterfly

Records
Preceded by Incumbent	Women's 100-metre butterfly world record-holder (short course); 18 February 1995 – 2 December 1995	Succeeded by Liu Limin
