= Ashley Tappin =

American swimmer (born 1974)

Personal information
- Full name: Ashley Tara Tappin
- National team: United States
- Born: December 18, 1974 (age 51) Marietta, Georgia, U.S.
- Height: 5 ft 10 in (1.78 m)
- Weight: 146 lb (66 kg)

Sport
- Sport: Swimming
- Strokes: Freestyle
- College team: University of Florida; University of Arizona
Medal record
Women's swimming
Representing the United States
Olympic Games
Gold medal – first place	1992 Barcelona	4×100 m freestyle
Gold medal – first place	2000 Sydney	4×100 m freestyle
Gold medal – first place	2000 Sydney	4×100 m medley
World Championships (LC)
Gold medal – first place	1991 Perth	4 x 100 m freestyle
Silver medal – second place	1994 Rome	4×100 m freestyle
Pan American Games
Gold medal – first place	1991 Havana	100 m freestyle
Gold medal – first place	1991 Havana	4×100 m freestyle
Gold medal – first place	1991 Havana	4×100 m medley

Ashley Tara Tappin (born December 18, 1974), also known by her married name Ashley Doussan, is an American former competition swimmer and three-time Olympic champion.

Tappin was born in Marietta, Georgia, a suburb of Atlanta, Georgia. She attended St. Martin's Episcopal School in Metairie, Louisiana.

Tappin competed at the 1992 Olympic Games in Barcelona, Spain, where she earned a gold medal by swimming for the winning U.S. team in the preliminary heats of the women's 4×100-meter freestyle relay.

In the January 1996 issue of Swimming World, Tappin was featured on the cover with the caption 'Ashley Tappin University of Arizona's Sprint Free Champ'. She again was on the cover for the March 1999 issue with the headline 'Tappin's The Name: Winnin's The Game'. Inside that issue is an article on Tappin titled 'Tappin on the Door to Success' by Kari Lydersen with photos by Lori Adamski-Peek.

At the 2000 Olympic Games in Sydney, Australia, she received gold medals for swimming for the first-place U.S. teams in the preliminary heats of the women's 4×100-meter medley relay, and the women's 4×100-meter freestyle relay.

Tappin attended the University of Florida in Gainesville, Florida, where she swam for coach Mitch Ivey and coach Chris Martin's Florida Gators swimming and diving team in National Collegiate Athletic Association (NCAA) competition in 1993 and 1994. She won an NCAA championship in the 4×100-meter medley relay with teammates Janie Wagstaff, Shannon Price and Nicole Haislett in 1994. Subsequently, she transferred to the University of Arizona in Tucson, Arizona, where she swam for the Arizona Wildcats swimming and diving team, and won five more NCAA titles.

Tappin served as the head coach of the UNO Privateers swim team at the University of New Orleans in New Orleans, Louisiana, from 2004 to 2007. She is a veteran celebrity swimmer for Swim Across America (SAA), a charitable organization that raises funds for cancer research, and she has participated in three SAA events in Boston, Massachusetts.

== See also ==
- List of multiple Olympic gold medalists
- List of Olympic medalists in swimming (women)
- List of University of Arizona people
- List of University of Florida Olympians
