= Swimming at the 1991 Pan American Games – Women's 100 metre freestyle =

Women's 100 metre freestyle at the 1991 Pan American Games
- Venue: -
- Dates: August 12 (preliminaries and finals)
- Competitors: from - nations

Medalists
Gold medal	Ashley Tappin	United States
Silver medal	Megan Oesting	United States
Bronze medal	Kristin Topham	Canada

The women's 100 metre freestyle competition of the swimming events at the 1991 Pan American Games took place on 12 August. The last Pan American Games champion was Silvia Poll of Costa Rica.

This race consisted of two lengths of the pool, both lengths being in freestyle.

== Results ==
All times are in minutes and seconds.

KEY:	q	Fastest non-qualifiers	Q	Qualified	GR	Games record	NR	National record	PB	Personal best	SB	Seasonal best

=== Final ===
The final was held on August 12.

Rank	Name	Nationality	Time	Notes
1st place, gold medalist(s)	Ashley Tappin	United States	56.51	
2nd place, silver medalist(s)	Megan Oesting	United States	57.14	
3rd place, bronze medalist(s)	Kristin Topham	Canada	57.63	
4	Deborah Figueroa	Cuba	57.97	
5	Sharon Turner	Canada	58.17	
6	Paolette Filippini	Brazil	58.22	
7	Laura Sánchez	Mexico	58.86	
8	Paula Marsiglia	Brazil	58.89	
