= Nian Yun =

Chinese swimmer

Medal record

Women's swimming

Representing China

Olympic Games
Silver medal – second place	1996 Atlanta	4×100 m freestyle

Nian Yun (Chinese: 年芸; pinyin: Nián Yún; born 9 October 1982) is a Chinese swimmer and Olympic medalist. She participated at the 1996 Summer Olympics in Atlanta, winning a silver medal in 4 x 100 metre freestyle relay.
