= Swimming at the 1983 Pan American Games – Women's 4 × 100 metre medley relay =

Women's 4 × 100 metre medley relay at the 1983 Pan American Games
- Venue: -
- Dates: August 21 (preliminaries and finals)
- Competitors: from - nations

Medalists
Gold medal	Susan Walsh, Kim Rhodenbaugh, Laurie Lehner and Carrie Steinseifer	United States
Silver medal	Anne Ottenbrite, Jane Kerr, -, -	Canada
Bronze medal	-,-,-,-	Mexico

The women's 4 × 100 metre medley relay competition of the swimming events at the 1983 Pan American Games took place on 21 August. The last Pan American Games champion was the United States.

== Results ==
All times are in minutes and seconds.

KEY:	q	Fastest non-qualifiers	Q	Qualified	GR	Games record	NR	National record	PB	Personal best	SB	Seasonal best

=== Final ===
The final was held on August 21.

Rank	Name	Nationality	Time	Notes
1st place, gold medalist(s)	Susan Walsh; Kim Rhodenbaugh; Laurie Lehner; Carrie Steinseifer	United States	4:12.99	GR
2nd place, silver medalist(s)	Anne Ottenbrite; Jane Kerr - -	Canada	4:13.84	
3rd place, bronze medalist(s)	- - - -	Mexico	4:30.72	
4	- - - -	Brazil	4:38.62	
5	- - - -	Argentina	4:40.18	
6	- - - -	Venezuela	4:41.47	
7	- - - -	Puerto Rico	4:44.82	
8	- - - -	Cuba	4:51.52	
