= Chao Na =

Chinese swimmer (born 1980)

Personal information
- Full name: 晁 娜
- Nationality: Chinese
- Born: March 13, 1980 (age 46) Beijing
- Height: 178 cm (5 ft 10 in)

Sport
- Sport: Swimming
- Strokes: Freestyle
Medal record
Women's swimming
Representing China
Olympic Games
Silver medal – second place	1996 Atlanta	4x100 m freestyle
World Championships (SC)
Silver medal – second place	1995 Rio de Janeiro	100 m freestyle
Gold medal – first place	1995 Rio de Janeiro	4x100 m freestyle
Gold medal – first place	1997 Gothenburg	4x100 m freestyle
Asian Games
Silver medal – second place	1998 Bangkok	100 m freestyle
Gold medal – first place	1998 Bangkok	4×100 m freestyle

Chao Na (born March 13, 1980) is a Chinese swimmer. She is a former World Champion and Olympic silver medalist. She was born in Beijing.

In 1995, Chao Na was selected for the 2nd FINA World Short Course Championships in Rio de Janeiro. She won a silver medal in the 100-metre freestyle and became world champion in the 4 x 100-metre freestyle relay. Two years later, at the 3rd FINA World Short Course Championships in Gothenburg, Chao Na again became world champion in the 4 x 100-metre freestyle relay. The winning Chinese relay team set a new world record, finishing at 3.34,55 minutes. The record remained unbeaten until 2006.

Chao Na participated at the 1996 Summer Olympics in Atlanta, winning a silver medal in 4 x 100-metre freestyle relay.

At the 1998 Asian Games in Bangkok, Chao Na won a silver medal in the 100-metre freestyle and swam to victory in the 4 x 100-metre freestyle relay.
