= Cristina Teuscher =

American swimmer (born 1978)

Personal information
- Full name: Cristina Teuscher
- National team: United States
- Born: March 12, 1978 (age 48) Bronx, New York, U.S.
- Height: 6 ft 1 in (1.85 m)
- Weight: 150 lb (68 kg)
- Spouse: Amerigo Fabbri

Sport
- Sport: Swimming
- Strokes: Freestyle, individual medley
- Club: Badger Swim Club
- College team: Columbia University
- Coach: John Collins Jr. (Badger Club); Diana Caskey (Columbia)
Medal record
Women's swimming
Representing the United States
Olympic Games
Gold medal – first place	1996 Atlanta	4×200 m freestyle
Bronze medal – third place	2000 Sydney	200 m medley
World Championships (LC)
Gold medal – first place	2001 Fukuoka	4×200 m freestyle
Silver medal – second place	1994 Rome	400 m freestyle
Silver medal – second place	1998 Perth	4×200 m freestyle
Bronze medal – third place	1994 Rome	4×200 m freestyle
Pan Pacific Championships
Gold medal – first place	1995 Atlanta	4×200 m freestyle
Gold medal – first place	1999 Sydney	4×200 m freestyle
Silver medal – second place	1995 Atlanta	200 m freestyle
Silver medal – second place	1999 Sydney	200 m medley
Bronze medal – third place	1999 Sydney	400 m medley
Pan American Games
Gold medal – first place	1995 Mar del Plata	200 m freestyle
Gold medal – first place	1995 Mar del Plata	4×100 m freestyle
Gold medal – first place	1995 Mar del Plata	4×200 m freestyle
Silver medal – second place	1995 Mar del Plata	400 m freestyle

Cristina Teuscher (born March 12, 1978) is an American former freestyle and medley swimmer who was a member of the U.S. women's relay team that won the gold medal in the 4×200-meter freestyle at the 1996 Summer Olympics in Atlanta, Georgia and won a bronze in the 2000-meter IM at the 2000 Summer Olympics in Sydney, Australia.

== Early life and swimming ==
Born on March 12, 1978, in Bronx, New York, to Argentine-Americans Enrique Teuscher, a psychiatrist, and Monica Teuscher, Christina was a 1996 graduate of New Rochelle High School. Not the only swimmer among her siblings, her three-year older sister Caroline swam for the College of William and Mary. An outstanding student, Cristina, graduated tenth in her class of 493 at New Rochelle, and received the Leonard Talner Award for bringing the most honor to her school.

During her High School years, she swam first for the New Rochelle Aquatic Club beginning around age six and then when the Club closed moved to the Badger Swim Club in Larchmont, New York at age 10. At New Rochelle Aquatic Club, she was initially coached by Carle Fierro, who taught her the basics, and both Carle and Kip Fierro worked on her technique and stroke development. Teuscher moved to the Badger Swim Club around age ten and Head Coach John Collins Jr. took over her training in earnest when she was 13. Collins also provided training to Teuscher at times outside of the Badger Club regular practices. By 16, while preparing for the 1996 Olympic trials with Collins, she trained with three other Badger Swim Club members at the 50-meter Olympic caliber pool at the APEX Sports Complex at Lehman College in the Bronx where the Badger Club continued to train in the winter months. Teuscher continued to train at times with the Badger Club during her studies at Columbia University, and during a few summer breaks from Columbia.

== 1996, 2000 Olympic medals ==
=== 1996 Atlanta Olympic gold medal ===
An eighteen year old, only a few months before graduating New Rochelle High, Teuscher participated in the March, 1996 U.S. Olympic Trials in Indianapolis. She won the 200-meter freestyle in a personal best time of 1:59.50, also qualifying in the 400 freestyle where she placed second with a 4:11.59. In the 400 freestyle final, she led former Champion Janet Evans through the first 350 meters, before being passed. Teuscher also qualified as an alternate in the 400 freestyle relay.

Her teammates for the gold medal-winning 4×200-meter freestyle relay at the July, 1996 Atlanta Olympics were Jenny Thompson, Trina Jackson and Sheila Taormina who completed the team event with a combined time of 7:59.87. Teuscher's performance was noteworthy as she swam the fastest leg of the relay with a time of 1:58.86, helping the team edge ahead of the competition. The American 4x200 relay team were challenged primarily by the German team who placed second for the silver with a combined time of 8:01.55, less than two seconds behind the Americans. At the 1996 Olympics, Teuscher also participated in the 200-meter freestyle, placing sixth, and the 400-meter freestyle, placing eighth. At the 1996 Olympics, Teuscher was coached by the U.S. Women's Head Olympic Coach Richard Quick.

Her winning of a 1996 Olympic gold medal was recognized and celebrated in New Rochelle on August 8, 1996, with a motorcade from her High School, New Rochelle, to City Hall where locals lined the route and she was presented with a proclamation from New Rochelle's Mayor Tim Idoni at City Hall. On July 28,1998, Teuscher won the 200-meter freestyle event at the Good Will Games with a time of 1:59.63, setting a Game's record. In individual events, she also placed third in the 800 freestyle, and first in the 400-meter freestyle with a time of 4:12.16.

=== 2000 Sydney Olympic bronze medal ===
Four years later, while captain of the U.S. women's team, at the 2000 Summer Olympics in Sydney in the 200-meter individual medley finals, Teuscher placed third capturing the bronze medal in a time of 2:13.32, around 0.85 seconds behind the silver medalist Beatrice Caslaru of Roumania. The event favorite and gold medal winner, Ukrainian Yana Klochkova, led throughout the race, but had to hold on to a two-second lead in the last 100 meters. The Olympic field was narrowed when China's Wu Yanyan, who had set the event record in May 2000, was eliminated after testing positive for anabolic steroids. In the 2000 Olympics the U.S. Women's team Head Coach was Hall of Fame Coach Mark Schubert.

=== International competition ===
Cristina swam as a member of the United States National Swim Team from 1994 to 2001, serving as Captain from 1999 to 2001. In international competition outside the Olympics, she participated in the 1994, 1998, and 2001 World Championships, earning four medals, three in the 4x200 free relay, including a gold in 2001, and won an individual silver medal in the 400 freestyle in 1994. Teuscher won five medals at the Pan Pacific Championships in 1995 and 1999, winning gold medals both years in the 4x200 free relay, silver medals in both IMs in 1999, and her fifth medal, another silver in the 200 freestyle in 1995. She also swam in the 1995 Pan American Games in Mar del Plata, Argentina, her parents' native country, while still in High School, capturing three gold medals, with two in the freestyle relays and the 200 freestyle, and a silver medal in the 400 free. In winning the 200-meter freestyle at the 1995 Pan American Games in Mar del Plata, she swam faster times than former Olympic gold medal freestylists Janet Evans and Jenny Thompson, which immediately drew considerable attention from the global swimming community.

=== Columbia University ===
She was a 2000 graduate of Columbia University, graduating with a degree in psychology. A few coaches may have questioned her choice of Columbia as it was not a top ten rated school in swimming, but Teuscher wanted to stay close to her Coach at Badger, and she preferred the Columbia environment. She swam for the Columbia Lions from around 1996-2000 and was managed by Columbia Women's Head Coach Diana Caskey, a former All-American swimmer for Princeton, outstanding distance freestyler, and former swim coach for New Jersey's National High School Championship winning Peddie Preparatory School. While swimming for Columbia, Teuscher was an All-American and four-time NCAA champion, and in her Senior year served as team Co-Captain. She won 12 Ivy League titles, and set 17 Columbia team records. In four years of collegiate competition in dual meets, she never lost an individual race. She later completed her MBA at INSEAD in Paris in 2007.

After college graduation in 2000, she swam professionally, retiring from elite competitive swimming in 2001. Around late 2001, she worked for the Robin Hood Foundation supporting relief for 9/11 victims, and then worked for around two years as an Analyst for Ziff Brothers Investments including eight months at the company's London Office. After 2004, she spent some time travelling giving swim tours at European lakes, and helping to care for her grandmother in Argentina. She served on the USA Olympic swim coaches six-member selection committee for 2008.

=== Coaching and instructing ===
Around June 2005, her Coach John Collins welcomed her back as a Coach and instructor for Badger Swimming where she remained through 2006. The interlude gave her time to apply to graduate schools, but by the Fall she was pursuing an MBA graduate degree full time at INSEAD in Paris. Beginning in May 2010, she followed Yale legend Frank Keefe as head coach of Yale Women's Swimming from 2010 to 2012. During her short tenure as head coach, the Bulldogs finished fifth and third in the Ivy League, respectively. Teuscher has also administered, and instructed for Sweet Blue Swim Academy in Greenwich, Connecticut, having founded the program with her husband, Amerigo Fabbri, a former 20-year Yale administrator and Dean, and has been active in the program in the 2020s. The program instructs students from very young children to adults, including competitive athletes, and has featured as many as six instructors on staff. It does not currently have a competitive team. She has served on the board of directors for the Collegiate Women's Sports Awards.

=== Honors ===
After her Senior Year at Columbia, she was a recipient of the Connie Maniatty Award as the university's top female senior athlete and the Honda Sports Award for the years 1997–98, given to the nation's most outstanding collegiate swimmer. She was later voted the 2000 Honda-Broderick Cup as the best collegiate women's athlete in America, then the only Ivy League student to ever receive the honor and only the fourth swimmer. At Columbia, she won all four NCAA championship events in which she competed, and was named the Outstanding Ivy League Swimmer in all four years of college eligibility. She was one of the first inductees into the Columbia University's first Athletic Hall of Fame in 2006.

The Cristina Teuscher Intercollegiate Women's Sports Endowment at Columbia was named in her honor. The fund is used to improve the entire range of Columbia's women's sports.

== See also ==
- List of Olympic medalists in swimming (women)
- List of World Aquatics Championships medalists in swimming (women)
