= Barbara Bedford (swimmer) =

American swimmer (born 1972)

Personal information
- Full name: Barbara Jane Bedford
- Nickname: "B.J."
- National team: United States
- Born: November 9, 1972 (age 53) Hanover, New Hampshire, U.S.
- Height: 5 ft 9 in (1.75 m)
- Weight: 134 lb (61 kg)

Sport
- Sport: Swimming
- Strokes: Backstroke
- College team: University of Texas '94
- Coach: Chris Martin (Peddie); Mark Schubert (UT); Jill Sterkel (UT)
Medal record
Women's swimming
Representing the United States
Olympic Games
Gold medal – first place	2000 Sydney	4×100 m medley
World Championships (LC)
Gold medal – first place	1998 Perth	4×100 m freestyle
Bronze medal – third place	1994 Rome	100 m backstroke
World Championships (SC)
Bronze medal – third place	1995 Rio	100 m backstroke
Bronze medal – third place	1995 Rio	4×100 m medley
Pan Pacific Championships
Gold medal – first place	1993 Kobe	200 m backstroke
Gold medal – first place	1999 Sydney	4×100 m medley
Silver medal – second place	1993 Kobe	100 m backstroke
Bronze medal – third place	1999 Sydney	200 m backstroke
Pan American Games
Gold medal – first place	1995 Mar del Plata	100 m backstroke
Gold medal – first place	1995 Mar del Plata	200 m backstroke
Gold medal – first place	1995 Mar del Plata	4×100 m medley
Universiade
Gold medal – first place	1991 Sheffield	100 m backstroke
Gold medal – first place	1991 Sheffield	4×100 m medley
Gold medal – first place	1993 Buffalo	100 m backstroke

Barbara Jane Bedford (born November 9, 1972), who competed as BJ Bedford, currently known by her married name, Barbara Miller, is an American former competition swimmer for the University of Texas, a 2000 Sydney Olympic champion, and a former world record-holder.

Bedford was born on November 9, 1972, in Hanover, New Hampshire, as the youngest of four children with three older brothers. She took to swimming by the age of five as part of a swimming family, as her brother Fritz was an All American at St. Lawrence, and brother Ed was an NCAA Division III Butterfly champion. She swam in her Freshman year for Hanover High School. As an eight year old in August 1981, she set a girls' medley relay team record with a time of 1:23.783, helping the Hanover Swim Team win the Division 1 State Swim Meet. She continued winning events for Hanover as a ten year old in July, 1983. She attended her Sophomore year at Kimball Union Academy.

== Peddie School ==
Beginning in her high school junior year, in the fall of 1988, she competed for swimming powerhouse Peddie School in Hightstown, New Jersey under coach Chris Martin. Martin coached the Peddie School from 1986 to 1992, and led the Peddie girls’ team to win their first combined national championship for public and independent schools in 1989. Martin would coach at the University of Florida in 1992. In the 1988 Eastern Interscholastic High School Championships, she won the 100 backstroke in 1:03.9, and placed second in the 50-freestyle. A strong regional competitor, Peddie School would win the team championships at the 1989 Eastern Interscholastic Championships as well. She won a gold medal in the 100-meter backstroke and a silver in the medley relay in the summer of her High School Junior year at the U.S. Olympic festival in Oklahoma. At the U.S. Senior Nationals, she finished fifth in the 100-meter backstroke in her Junior year. She was able to attend the Pan Pacifics as the 2nd, 3rd, and 4th-place finishers at U.S. Nationals either scratched or didn't want to attend.

Helping Peddie School win the team championship at the Eastern Interscholastic Championships at LaSalle University in February, 1990, she placed first in the 100 backstroke with a highly improved 55.63, breaking the national prep record, and placed first in the 400 freestyle relay, second in the 200-yard medley relay, and first in the 200 Individual Medley with a meet record time of 2:02.81. Overall, in her career at Peddie, she help lead the team to three consecutive Eastern Championships and was on the team that placed second at Nationals in 1990. By her Junior year at Peddie School, she increased her daily swim yardage from 5000 to 16,000 yards.

== University of Texas ==
She attended and swam for the University of Texas, under Hall of Fame Coach Mark Schubert, graduating in 1994. In her Junior and Senior years at Texas, she swam for former Texas swimmer, and Olympic Gold Medalist, Woman's Head Coach Jill Sterkel. Sterkel was an American Swimming Coaches Association Hall of Fame recipient. While attending Texas, Bedford was an All-American 21 times, and a two-time National Champion. She was a member of Texas's 1991 NCAA national title winning 200 Medley Relay team, helping the Longhorns win the National Championship that year, and captured a gold medal with the Longhorns’ 200 Freestyle Relay team in 1992. She won five Southwest Conference individual titles, a 100-butterfly in 1991 and 1992, a 100 and 200-back in 1994, and a 200-IM in 1991. She also swam as a member of six relay teams in conference championships.

== Olympic trials ==
She finished seventh in the 100-back at the 1992 Olympic Trials, and was seriously disappointed with her third in the 100-back in 1996, preventing her from qualifying for the team.

== International competition ==
In international competition, she captured gold in the 100 backstroke at the 1998 World Championships, and also won a prestigious bronze in the 100 backstroke at the 1994 World Championships. She continued to compete internationally for the U.S. team from 1993 to 2000, taking two golds at the Pan Pacific Championships, in the 200 backstroke in 1993 and the medley relay in 1999.

In 1994 she won three medals at the Goodwill Games, consisting of a gold in the 200-back, and silvers in the 100-back and 400-medley relay.

In her career, she was a national champion seven times with five in the 100 back, and one time each in the 200 backstroke and 50 meter freestyle.

== 2000 Sydney Olympics ==
Making her first U.S. Women's Olympic team in Indianapolis, on August 11, 2000, Bedford won the 100-back at the 2000 Olympic Trials with a time of 1:01.85, touching out second-place finisher Courtney Shealey who swam a 1:02.05.

After qualifying in the trials, Bedford represented the United States at the 2000 Summer Olympics in Sydney, Australia. Swimming the backstroke leg, she was a member of the U.S. team that won the Olympic gold medal in the women's 4×100-meter medley relay and set a new world record of 3:58.30 in the event final. Her record-setting teammates included Megan Quann (breaststroke), Jenny Thompson (butterfly), and Dara Torres (freestyle).

She also placed sixth in the finals of the 100-meter backstroke with a time of 1:01.47, bettering her trials time, but not sufficient to medal in the intense global competition of the Olympics. She finished around .5 seconds, and three places out of medal contention behind bronze medalist Nina Zhivanevskaya of Spain.

In the 2000 Olympics, the Women's team was coached by Hall of Fame Coach Richard Quick who had previously coached the University of Texas women's team through 1988, when he moved to coach Stanford.

After completing 10 years with the USA Swimming National Team, Bedford, retired from competitive swimming in early 2001. Her official statement of retirement to the press came at the end of the World Cup short-course swimming meet in January, 2001 in Paris.

== Honors ==
She is a member of the University of Texas Athletic Hall of Fame, and was inducted into the Peddie School Athletic Hall of Fame in 2014.

Due to their overall performances in 1989 and 1990, Swimming World Magazine named the Peddie girls the National High School Champions.

In 2000, the Newark Star Ledger named Bedford to New Jersey's Top 10 All-Century Swimming Team.

== Later life ==
Retaining an active role in the swimming community, as B.J. Miller, she has served with USA Swimming's House of Delegates. She worked in software sales and marketing after retiring from swimming around 2009 and has more recently served as the Vice President of Sales for Parity, a new company hoping to close or greatly narrow the gender pay gap in sports.

== See also ==
- List of Olympic medalists in swimming (women)
- List of University of Texas at Austin alumni
- List of World Aquatics Championships medalists in swimming (women)
- Pan American Games records in swimming
- World record progression 4 × 100 metres medley relay
