= Rachel Harris =

Australian swimmer

Personal information
- Full name: Rachel Amanda Harris
- National team: Australia
- Born: 15 March 1979 (age 47) Perth, Western Australia
- Height: 1.76 m (5 ft 9 in)
- Weight: 72 kg (159 lb)

Sport
- Sport: Swimming
- Strokes: Freestyle, medley
Medal record
Women's swimming
Representing Australia
World Championships (SC)
Silver medal – second place	1999 Hong Kong	800 m freestyle
Pan Pacific Championships
Silver medal – second place	1999 Sydney	800 m freestyle
Commonwealth Games
Gold medal – first place	1998 Kuala Lumpur	800 m freestyle

Rachel Amanda Harris OLY (born 15 March 1979) is an Australian former freestyle and medley swimmer, who is now a prominent Sport & Exercise Medicine physician.

== Swimming career ==
She competed at the 2000 Summer Olympics in Sydney, Australia. There she finished in twelfth position in the women's 800-metre freestyle, and twelfth in the 400-metre individual medley.

Harris won the gold medal in the 800-metre freestyle at the 1998 Commonwealth Games in Kuala Lumpur, Malaysia.. She also was a silver medalist in the 800m at the Pan Pacific Championships in 1999. She was inducted into the Hall of Fame at WA Swimming in 2008.

== Sports medicine career ==
In 2003, Harris began studying at the University of Western Australia and graduated with a Bachelor of Medicine, Bachelor of Surgery 2008. She is a sports medicine specialist and Fellow of the Australasian College of Sport and Exercise Physicians. She now works as a specialist Sport and Exercise Medicine physician.

Harris has served as the Chief Medical Officer for all of Paralympics Australia, Water Polo Australia and Swimming Australia. She is based in Perth, Western Australia. She has been the Project Lead for the Female Performance and Health Initiative at the Australian Institute of Sport.

She has served on the board of the Australasian College of Sport and Exercise Physicians and in November 2026 was voted in as ACSEP President Elect.
