= Danielle Bell =

American politician

Member of the Georgia House of Representatives from the 44th district
- Member-elect
- Assumed office January 11, 2027
- Preceded by: Don Parsons

Personal details
- Born: Batesville, Indiana
- Party: Democratic
- Education: DePauw University; Case Western Reserve University
- Website: Official website

Danielle Bell is an American politician who is a member-elect of the Georgia House of Representatives, representing the 19th district. She was elected to the Georgia House of Representatives, in the general election on November 3, 2026.
