= Svetlana Leshukova =

Russian swimmer (born 1974)

Personal information
- Born: 7 June 1974 (age 52) Sverdlovsk, Russian SFSR, Soviet Union
- Height: 1.81 m (5 ft 11 in)
- Weight: 65 kg (143 lb)

Sport
- Sport: Swimming
- Club: SKA Chelyabinsk
Medal record
Swimming
Representing Russia
European Championships
Bronze medal – third place	1993 Sheffield	4×100 m freestyle
Bronze medal – third place	1997 Seville	4×100 m freestyle

Svetlana Yuryevna Leshukova (Russian: Светлана Юрьевна Лешукова; born 7 June 1974) is a Russian retired swimmer who won two bronze medals in the 4×100 m freestyle relay at the European championships in 1993 and 1997. She competed in the same event at the 1992 Summer Olympics as a member of the Unified Team, finishing fourth. She also competed in the 1996 Summer Olympics representing Russia. In 1997, she graduated from Ural State University in Yekaterinburg.

After marriage she changed her last name to Sosnovskaya (Russian: Сосновская).
