= Marianne Limpert =

Canadian swimmer (born 1972)

Personal information
- Full name: Marianne Louise Limpert
- National team: Canada
- Born: October 10, 1972 (age 54) Matagami, Quebec, Canada
- Occupations: Program Promotions (New Brunswick Power Co.)
- Height: 1.80 m (5 ft 11 in)
- Weight: 74 kg (163 lb)

Sport
- Sport: Swimming
- Strokes: Freestyle, Individual Medley
- Club: Fredericton Aquanaut Swim Team; Vancouver Pacific Dolphins
- College team: McGill University, Montreal; University of British Columbia
- Coach: Claude St. Jean (FAST); Claude St. Jean (CAMO, Montreal); Tom Johnson (Dolphins, U of BC); Randy Bennett (U of BC)
Medal record
Women's swimming
Representing Canada
Olympic Games
Silver medal – second place	Atlanta 1996	200 m medley
World Championships (SC)
Gold medal – first place	1995 Rio	4x200 m freestyle
Silver medal – second place	2000 Athens	100 m medley
Bronze medal – third place	2000 Athens	200 m medley
Pan Pacific Championships
Silver medal – second place	1997 Fukuoka	200 m medley
Silver medal – second place	1997 Fukuoka	4x200 m freestyle
Bronze medal – third place	1993 Kobe	4x100 m freestyle
Bronze medal – third place	1995 Atlanta	4x200 m freestyle
Bronze medal – third place	1999 Sydney	4x100m freestyle
Bronze medal – third place	1999 Sydney	4x200m freestyle
Commonwealth Games
Gold medal – first place	1998 Kuala Lumpur	200 m medley
Silver medal – second place	1994 Victoria	200 m medley
Bronze medal – third place	1994 Victoria	100 m freestyle
Bronze medal – third place	1994 Victoria	4x100 m freestyle
Bronze medal – third place	1994 Victoria	4x200 m freestyle
Bronze medal – third place	1994 Victoria	4x100 m medley
Bronze medal – third place	1998 Kuala Lumpur	4x100 m freestyle
Bronze medal – third place	2002 Manchester	200 m medley
Bronze medal – third place	2002 Manchester	4x100 m freestyle
Pan American Games
Gold medal – first place	Winnipeg 1999	4x100 m freestyle
Gold medal – first place	Winnipeg 1999	4x200 m freestyle
Silver medal – second place	Mar del Plata 1995	200 m freestyle
Silver medal – second place	Mar del Plata 1995	200 m medley
Silver medal – second place	1995 Mar del Plata	4x100 m freestyle
Silver medal – second place	1995 Mar del Plata	4x200 m freestyle
Silver medal – second place	1995 Mar del Plata	4x100 m medley
Bronze medal – third place	Mar del Plata 1995	100 m freestyle
Bronze medal – third place	Winnipeg 1999	100 m freestyle
Summer Universiade
Gold medal – first place	1993 Buffalo	200 m medley

Marianne Louise Limpert (born October 10, 1972) is a Canadian former freestyle and medley swimmer who competed in the Summer Olympics for Canada in 1992, 1996 and 2000, and won the silver medal in the 200-metre individual medley at the 1996 Olympics in Atlanta, Georgia. She swam for Canada in over 100 international competitions, winning 80 medals, including gold, silver, and bronze at the Wolrd Championships. She won a gold in 1995 World Championships in the 4x200m freestyle, and at the 2000 Worlds, won both a silver in the 100m medley and a bronze in the 200m individual medley. She won nine medals at the 1994, 1998, and 2002 Commonwealth Games, and served as Canada's flagbearer at the 1998 Commonwealth Games in Kuala Lumpur, Malaysia.

== Early life and swimming ==
Limpert was born October 10, 1972 in Matagami, Quebec to Heinz, a helicopter pilot and Marianne Limpert. He had trained in his youth as a boxer in his native country of Germany, and qualified for the 1964 Canadian Olympic team but could not compete as he had not lived in Canada long enough to gain citizenship. After the family moved to Canada's East Coast, Limpert spent her high school years in New Brunswick where she graduated from Fredericton High School in Fredericton, New Brunswick, the province's capital. Sue Leitch and Bruce Fisher were her swim coaches at Fredericton High. A strong team, by 1988, the Fredericton High School Black Cats swimming team had won the New Brunswick Interscholastic Association Swimming Championship (NBIAA) in three successive years. During High School, she also swam for the Fredericton Aquanaut Swim Team (FAST), a highly competitive program under accomplished swim coach Claude St. Jean. St. Jean was a Canadian Hall of Fame recipient, who mentored six Canadian Olympians during his career.

At 16 in August, 1989, she won a gold medal in the 100 meter breaststroke with a time of 1:13.82 at the 1989 Jeux Canada Games in Saskatoon. Swimming for FAST in December 1989, she set two provincial records, one in the 200 meter Individual Medley with a time of 2:20.04, and another record in the 400 meter individual medley. In 1990, she would improve on her 200 Meter IM time to 2:16.74, then the fifth best in the world. In 1989, and 1990, Limpert was named the New Brunswick Telegraph-Journal Female Athlete of the Year.

In September 1990, at 18, Limpert trained at the University of Toronto in Ontario, where she was managed by the university's head coach Byron McDonald.

=== McGill University ===
After the 1996 Olympics, Limpert enrolled at McGill University in Montreal beginning in the fall of 1996, majoring in humanistic studies and had an outstanding freshman year swimming for the school in 1996-97. While in Montreal, she continued training with her high school swim coach Claude St. Jean, who had moved to Montreal in 1996 to coach Club Aquatique Montreal, known as CAMO, the Montreal Aquatic Club which met at the Claud Robillard Center. CAMO was only around 6 miles or 10 km from the McGill Campus, convenient to Limpert.

In the 1996-1997 swimming season at McGill, Limpert won 25 races and led McGill to the Quebec conference title and a third-place finish at the CIAU national championships in St. Catharines, Ontario. It was the McGill swim team's highest finish ever at a national meet. Limpert held school records at McGill in the 100 breast of 1:11.08, in the 200 breast of 2:37.25, in the 200 Individual Medley of 2:14.21, a conference record. In relay events, she swam on winning teams that set a 4x50 free relay record of 1:49.74, a 4x100 free relay record of 3:52.92, a 4x200 free relay record of 8:20.02, both a conference and Canadian Interscholastic Athletic Union record, and a 4x100 medley relay record of 4:15.65. Earning all-Canadian honors from her performance at the CIAU Nationals, Limpert won five gold medals in the 50m and 100m breast, the 200m individual medley, the 4x100 medley relay, and the 4x200m freestyle relay. She also won a bronze at Nationals in the 4x100 free relay.

In July 1997, Limpert worked out early morning at CAMO in Montreal, attended classes and did a workout with the McGill swim team, but found the routine too exhausting. Her total yardage per day with her two workouts likely averaged 5–7 thousand meters, around 3–5 miles per day. She switched for a period to training primarily with the McGill Swim team and training with Claude St. Jean's CAMO Club only in the summers. Limpert also had responsibilities as part of the Canadian National Team during her years at McGill.

=== University of British Columbia ===
She later graduated from the University of British Columbia in Vancouver, completing a Bachelor of Arts degree in 2002. She likely received training from the university's Assistant swim coach Randy Bennett, who would coach the Canadian Olympic team at the 2012 Olympics. Limpert also swam for the Vancouver, British Columbia Pacific Dolphins Swim Club under the direction of Canadian national team coach Tom Johnson who coached the Dolphins from 1979-1990, though Johnson continued to coach Limpert beyond those years. He also served as the Head Swim coach of the University of British Columbia from 1990-2005 during Limpert's enrollment at the university. A nationally recognized coach, Johnson helped start the Canadian National Training Center at the University of British Columbia and served as a Director from 1998-2006, during all of Limpert's elite swimming career.

== Olympics ==
Representing Canada, Limpert swam in the 1992 Barcelona, 1996 Atlanta and 2000 Sydney Olympics for Canada. At the 1992 Summer Olympics in Barcelona, Limpert swam the lead off leg and placed 8th in the 4x100 meter freestyle relay and recorded a combined team time of 3:49.37. She made the finals, and placed 6th in the 200 meter Individual Medley swimming a time of 2:17.09.

=== 1996 Olympic Silver medal ===
At the 1996 Summer Olympics in Atlanta, Georgia, Limpert swam in the 200 m medley, winning the Silver medal in the finals with a time of 2:14.35. In a close finish with Ireland's Michelle Smith who swam a first place gold medal time of 2:13.93, Limpert touched .42 seconds later to take the silver medal. Smith became the first Irish gold medalist in the event. Limpert also placed 7th in the 4x100 meter freestyle relay and 5th in the 4x200 meter freestyle relay at the Atlanta Olympics.

At the 2000 Sydney Olympics, swimming for Canada, Limpert placed 7th in the 4x100 meter freestyle relay with a combined team time of 3:42.92, and placed 5th in the 4x200 meter freestyle relay with a combined team time of 8:02.65. Her 4th in the 200 meter Individual Medley, her signature event, was in a Canadian record time and personal best of 2:13.44, a strong effort, where she placed only .12 seconds behind American Christina Teuscher, the bronze medalist. Her relay team made the finals and swam a 6th in the 4x100 meter medley relay with a combined team time of 4:07.55.

== International competition ==
At the 1993 Pan Pacific Swimming Championships, she won a bronze medal in the 4x100-metre freestyle relay.

At the 1995 Pan American Games, she won two silver medals in the 200-metre freestyle and in the 200-metre individual medley, and a bronze medal in the 100-metre freestyle.

At the 1995 Pan Pacific Swimming Championships, she won a bronze medal in the 4x200-metre freestyle relay.

At the 1997 Pan Pacific Swimming Championships, she won two silver medals in the 200-metre individual medley and in the 4x200-metre freestyle relay.

At the 1999 Pan American Games, she won two gold medals in the 4x100 and 4x200-metre freestyle relay, and a bronze medal in the 100-metre freestyle.

At the 1999 Pan Pacific Swimming Championships, she won two bronze medals in the 4x100 and 4x200-metre freestyle relay.

After graduating from the University of British Columbia in 2002, she retired from active competition in 2005.

== Post swimming careers ==
After returning to her hometown of Fredericton New Brunswick, in service to the community, Marianne has served as a Board member for Sport New Brunswick, and Swim New Brunswick, and has volunteered at the SPCA of Fredericton. She served with the CBC Sports television broadcast team at the Beijing 2008 Olympics. After college graduation, since 2008 Marianne has served in customer service for the New Brunswick Power Company, in her hometown of Fredericton. She has more recently served with New Brunswick Power as a Coordinator of Program promotions, dealing with engagement with the community and investment initiatives.

=== Honors ===
The University of New Brunswick, in her hometown of Fredericton, New Brunswick, has an annual swim meet, the Marianne Limpert Team Cup, named after her.

In 1997, Limpert was named the Athlete of the Year, and University Athlete of the Year by the Quebec Swimming Federation. She was rated third in the world in the 200 meter Individual Medley that year.

Limpert became a member of the Canadian Olympic Hall of Fame in 2007 and was inducted into the New Brunswick Sports Hall of Fame in 2008.

As an outstanding collegiate competitor for multiple years, Limpert was admitted to the McGill University Sports Hall of Fame in 2021.

== See also ==
- List of Olympic medalists in swimming (women)
- List of Commonwealth Games medallists in swimming (women)
