= María Virginia Garrone =

Argentine swimmer

Personal information
- Full name: María Virginia Garrone
- National team: Argentina
- Born: 12 November 1978 (age 47) Córdoba, Argentina
- Height: 1.73 m (5 ft 8 in)
- Weight: 62 kg (137 lb)

Sport
- Sport: Swimming
- Strokes: Individual medley
- Club: Club Atletico de Córdoba
- Coach: Daniel Garimaldi

María Virginia Garrone (born November 12, 1978, in Córdoba) is an Argentine former swimmer, who specialized in individual medley events. She is a 2000 Olympian and a fifteen-time Argentine national champion in a medley double (both 200 and 400 m). During her sporting career, she trained for the swim team at Club Atletico de Córdoba under her longtime coach and mentor Daniel Garimaldi.

Garrone competed only in the women's 200 m individual medley at the 2000 Summer Olympics in Sydney. She set a meet record achieved a FINA B-cut of 2:20.59 from the South American Open Championships in Mar de Plata. She challenged seven other swimmers in heat two, including Czech Republic's three-time Olympian Hana Černá and South Korea's 15-year-old Nam Yoo-Sun. Garrone pushed off an early lead with a dominant butterfly leg, but faded down the stretch on the remaining laps to pick up a fifth seed in 2:22.98, almost 2.4 seconds below her entry standard and 5.4 behind leader Cerna. Garrone failed to advance into the semifinals, as she placed twenty-ninth overall in the prelims.
