= Alicia Barrancos =

Argentine swimmer

Personal information
- Born: May 2, 1972 (age 54)
Medal record
Women's swimming
Representing Argentina
Pan American Games
Bronze medal – third place	1995 Mar del Plata	800m Freestyle
Bronze medal – third place	1995 Mar del Plata	4x200m Freestyle

Alicia Barrancos (born May 2, 1972) is a retired female freestyle swimmer from Argentina who represented her native country at the 1996 Summer Olympics in Atlanta, Georgia. She claimed the bronze medal in the Women's 800m Freestyle event at the 1995 Pan American Games.
