= Blanca Cerón =

Spanish swimmer (born 1974)

Personal information
- Born: 11 August 1974 (age 51) Salamanca, Castile-Leon, Spain

Sport
- Sport: Swimming
Medal record
Representing Spain
Mediterranean Games
| Gold medal – first place | 1997 Bari | 4x100m freestyle relay |

Blanca Cerón Perín (born 11 August 1974) is a former freestyle swimmer from Spain, who competed for her native country at the 1996 Summer Olympics in Atlanta, Georgia. There she was eliminated in the qualifying heats of the 50 m freestyle, and the 4x100 m freestyle relay.
