= Katie Brambley =

Canadian swimmer (born 1979)

Personal information
- Full name: Katie Meredith Brambley
- National team: Canada
- Born: February 5, 1979 (age 47) Victoria, British Columbia
- Height: 1.63 m (5 ft 4 in)
- Weight: 61 kg (134 lb)

Sport
- Sport: Swimming
- Strokes: Freestyle
- Club: Pacific Dolphins Swim Club
Medal record
Women's swimming
Representing Canada
Pan Pacific Championships
Bronze medal – third place	1995 Atlanta	4x200 m freestyle
Pan American Games
Silver medal – second place	1995 Mar del Plata	4x100m freestyle
Silver medal – second place	1995 Mar del Plata	4x200m freestyle
Bronze medal – third place	1995 Mar del Plata	400 m freestyle

Katie Meredith Brambley (born February 5, 1979) is a Canadian former swimmer who specialized in middle-distance freestyle events. She captured two bronze medals from the 1995 Pan American Games, and later represented Canada at the 2000 Summer Olympics. During her sporting career, Brambley also trained for the Pacific Dolphins Swim Club, under head coach Tom Johnson, while taking up a bachelor's degree in political science at the University of British Columbia.

Brambley made her official debut at the 1995 Pan American Games in Mar del Plata, Argentina, where she collected two bronze medals each in the 400-metre freestyle (4:18.74), and as a member of the Canadian squad, in the 4×200-metre freestyle relay (8:08.25).

At the 2000 Summer Olympics in Sydney, Brambley competed only in the 4×200-metre freestyle relay. On the fifth night of the Games, the Canadians pulled off a fifth-place finish in the final with a time of 8:02.65, nearly five seconds off the Olympic record set by the Americans. Teaming with Jessica Deglau, Jen Button and Shannon Shakespeare in heat one on the morning prelims, Brambley swam the third leg and recorded a split of 2:02.40 to post a seventh-seeded time for the Canadians in 8:07.12.
