= Lisa Jacob =

American swimmer (born 1974)

Personal information
- Full name: Lisa Rae Jacob
- National team: United States
- Born: May 13, 1974 (age 52)
- Height: 5 ft 6 in (1.68 m)
- Weight: 126 lb (57 kg)

Sport
- Sport: Swimming
- Strokes: Freestyle
- Club: Mission Viejo Nadadores
- College team: Stanford University
- Coach: Skip Kenney; Stanford
Medal record
Women's swimming
Representing the United States
Olympic Games
Gold medal – first place	1996 Atlanta	4×100 m freestyle
Gold medal – first place	1996 Atlanta	4×200 m freestyle
Pan American Games
Gold medal – first place	1991 Havana	200 m freestyle
Gold medal – first place	1991 Havana	4×100 m freestyle
Gold medal – first place	1991 Havana	4×200 m freestyle
Summer Universiade
Gold medal – first place	1995 Fukuoka	200 m freestyle
Gold medal – first place	1995 Fukuoka	4×200 m freestyle

Lisa Rae Jacob (born May 13, 1974) is an American former competition swimmer who won two gold medals at the 1996 Summer Olympics in Atlanta.

== Early education and swimming ==
During her High School years, Lisa swam for Capistrano Valley High School under Coach Bob Skelley, and the nearby Mission Viejo Nadadores, an exceptional age group program then under the direction of Coach Terry Stoddard. As a High School Senior she won a pair of Southern Section 4-A Championships in the 200 and 500-yard freestyle events. Swimming a 1:49.44 in the 200, and a 4:50.60 in the 500, and was selected as the Los Angeles Times Orange County Girls Swimmer of the Year. She was also the only Senior on winning Capistrano Valley 200 and 400 freestyle relay teams.

At the 1992 Olympic trials in Indianapolis, Lisa swam in the 100, 200, 400 and 800-meter freestyle events. In an extremely competitive field of American women competitors, one of her best showings was in the 400 freestyle where she placed fifth with a time of 4:15.57.

== International competition ==
Jacob won three gold medals in the 200-meter freestyle, the 4×100-meter relay, and the 4×200-meter relay at the 1991 Pan American Games in Havana.

== Stanford ==
She attended Stanford University from 1992-1996, where she swam for the Stanford Cardinal swimming and diving team under Hall of Fame Coach Skip Kenney. She won three Pacific-10 Conference championships and two NCAA championships in the 1995–96 season at Stanford.

== 1996 Olympics ==
The highlight of her career was at the 1996 Summer Olympics in Atlanta, where as a member of the United States team led by Hall of Fame Coach Richard Quick, she won gold medals in both the 4×100 freestyle relay where the American team swam a combined 3:29.29 in the finals. At Atlanta, in the 4×200 freestyle relay where the American team swam a combined time of 7:59.87.

Lisa was married in Santa Barbara, CA in 2004 and resides with her husband outside of Washington, D.C.

== See also ==
- List of Olympic medalists in swimming (women)
- List of Stanford University people
