= Swimming at the 1973 World Aquatics Championships – Men's 200 metre individual medley =

Men's 200 metre individual medley at the 1973 World Aquatics Championships
- Dates: September 7, 1973
- Competitors: 27 from 20 nations
- Winning time: 2:08.36 CR

Medalists
gold medal	Gunnar Larsson	Sweden
silver medal	Stan Carper	United States
bronze medal	David Wilkie	Great Britain

The men's 200 metre individual medley competition of the swimming events at the 1973 World Aquatics Championships took place on September 7.

== Records ==
Prior to the competition, the existing world and championship records were as follows.

World record	Gunnar Larsson (SWE)	2:07.17	Munich, West Germany	3 September 1972
Competition record	N/A	N/A	N/A	N/A

The following records were established during the competition:

Date	Event	Name	Nationality	Time	Record
7 September	Heat 1	András Hargitay	Hungary	2:09.54	CR
7 September	Final	Gunnar Larsson	Sweden	2:08.36	CR

== Results ==
=== Heats ===
28 swimmers participated in 5 heats, qualified swimmers are listed:

Rank	Heat	Lane	Name	Nationality	Time	Notes
1	1	-	András Hargitay	Hungary	2:09.54	Q, CR
2	3	-	David Wilkie	Great Britain	2:09.61	Q, CWR
3	1	-	Christian Lietzmann	East Germany	2:09.91	Q
4	5	-	Gunnar Larsson	Sweden	2:10.13	Q
5	4	-	Stan Carper	United States	2:11.04	Q
6	3	-	Sergey Zakharov	Soviet Union	2:11.07	Q
7	2	-	Fred Tyler	United States	2:11.31	Q
8	5	-	Wolfram Sperling	East Germany	2:11.46	Q
9	2	-	Andrey Smirnov	Soviet Union	2:11.98	
10	3	-	Zoltán Verrasztó	Hungary	2:12.65	
11	4	-	Brian Brinkley	Great Britain	2:14.31	
12	5	-	David Brumwell	Canada	2:14.99	
13	3	-	Nigel Cluer	Papua New Guinea	2:15.90	
14	5	-	Tsuyoshi Yanagidate	Japan	2:16.01	
15	2	-	Steve Badger	Australia	2:16.42	
16	4	-	Jorge Delgado	Ecuador	2:16.47	
17	2	-	Eduardo Orejuela	Ecuador	2:16.58	
18	5	-	Neil Martin	Australia	2:17.01	
19	3	-	Ignacio Álvarez	Mexico	2:17.05	
20	4	-	Antônio Azevedo	Brazil	2:17.25	
21	2	-	Gunnar Gundersen	Norway	2:19.07	
22	1	-	Peter Tetlow	Australia	2:19.71	
23	3	-	Ramón Volcán	Venezuela	2:20.84	
24	1	-	Carlos Santiago	Puerto Rico	2:21.11	
25	2	-	Jorge Jaramillo	Colombia	2:21.39	
26	3	-	Helmut Podolan	Austria	2:21.72	
27	1	-	Ali Gharbi	Tunisia	2:22.62	
28	4	-	C. Manochehr	Iran	2:38.93	
–	4	-	Patrick Moreau	France	Did not start	
–	5	-	Michael Weiss	West Germany	Did not start	
–	1	-	Bandi Wetternek	Romania	Did not start	

=== Final ===
The results of the final are below.

Rank	Lane	Name	Nationality	Time	Notes
1st place, gold medalist(s)	6	Gunnar Larsson	Sweden	2:08.36	CR
2nd place, silver medalist(s)	2	Stan Carper	United States	2:08.43	
3rd place, bronze medalist(s)	5	David Wilkie	Great Britain	2:08.84	CWR
4	4	András Hargitay	Hungary	2:09.52	
5	3	Christian Lietzmann	East Germany	2:09.57	
6	8	Wolfram Sperling	East Germany	2:10.54	
7	1	Fred Tyler	United States	2:10.86	
8	7	Sergey Zakharov	Soviet Union	2:10.86	
