= Swimming at the 1973 World Aquatics Championships – Men's 200 metre breaststroke =

Men's 200 metre breaststroke at the 1973 World Aquatics Championships
- Dates: September 6, 1973
- Competitors: 31 from 24 nations
- Winning time: 2:19.28

Medalists
gold medal	David Wilkie	Great Britain
silver medal	John Hencken	United States
bronze medal	Nobutaka Taguchi	Japan

The men's 200 metre breaststroke competition of the swimming events at the 1973 World Aquatics Championships took place on September 6.

== Records ==
Prior to the competition, the existing world and championship records were as follows.

World record	John Hencken (USA)	2:20.52	Louisville, United States	24 August 1973
Competition record	N/A	N/A	N/A	N/A

The following records were established during the competition:

Date	Event	Name	Nationality	Time	Record
6 September	Heat 1	Mikhail Khryukin	Soviet Union	2:24.85	CR
6 September	Heat 2	David Wilkie	United Kingdom	2:20.94	CR
6 September	Final	David Wilkie	United Kingdom	2:19.28	WR

== Results ==
=== Heats ===
31 swimmers participated in 4 heats. Th eight fastest times advanced to the final.

Rank	Heat	Lane	Name	Nationality	Time	Notes
1	2	-	David Wilkie	Great Britain	2:20.94	Q, CR, CWR
2	4	-	John Hencken	United States	2:21.50	Q
3	2	-	Igor Cherdakov	Soviet Union	2:24.30	Q
4	1	-	Mikhail Khryukin	Soviet Union	2:24.85	Q, CR
5	1	-	Nobutaka Taguchi	Japan	2:25.45	Q
6	2	-	Nigel Cluer	Papua New Guinea	2:25.87	Q
7	3	-	Rick Colella	United States	2:26.17	Q
8	3	-	Jürgen Glas	East Germany	2:27.77	Q
9	4	-	Felipe Muñoz	Mexico	2:28.34	
10	2	-	Giorgio Lalle	Italy	2:29.08	
11	3	-	Ove Wisloff	Norway	2:29.46	
12	2	-	Pedro Balcells	Spain	2:30.52	
13	4	-	Ulrich Nitzsche	East Germany	2:31.01	
14	1	-	Peter Hrdlitschka	Canada	2:31.34	
15	3	-	Steffen Kriechbaum	Austria	2:31.56	
16	4	-	Cezary Smiglak	Poland	2:32.50	
17	3	-	Pawe Dyrek	Poland	2:32.66	
18	2	-	Mel Zajac	Canada	2:33.15	
19	1	-	Michael Creswick	Australia	2:33.34	
20	1	-	G. Islas	Mexico	2:33.99	
21	4	-	Sérgio Pinto Ribeiro	Brazil	2:34.07	
22	1	-	Alfredo Hunger	Peru	2:34.78	
23	3	-	Tuomo Kerolo	Finland	2:35.29	
24	4	-	Bernard Combet	France	2:35.34	
25	2	-	Zdravko Divjak	Yugoslavia	2:38.50	
26	2	-	Orlando Catinchi	Puerto Rico	2:40.14	
27	1	-	Carlos Nazario	Puerto Rico	2:43.79	
28	3	-	Faruk Morkal	Turkey	2:44.12	
29	4	-	H. Ashfin	Iran	2:48.80	
–	4	-	Angel Chakarov	Bulgaria	Did not start	
–	3	-	Anders Norling	Sweden	Did not start	

=== Final ===
The results of the final are below.

Rank	Lane	Name	Nationality	Time	Notes
1st place, gold medalist(s)	4	David Wilkie	Great Britain	2:19.28	WR
2nd place, silver medalist(s)	5	John Hencken	United States	2:19.95	
3rd place, bronze medalist(s)	-	Nobutaka Taguchi	Japan	2:23.11	
4	-	Mikhail Khryukin	Soviet Union	2:23.47	
5	-	Nigel Cluer	Papua New Guinea	2:25.87	
6	-	Rick Colella	United States	2:26.41	
7	-	Jürgen Glas	East Germany	2:26.56	
8	-	Igor Cherdakov	Soviet Union	2:28.18	
