= Swimming at the 1973 World Aquatics Championships – Men's 100 metre backstroke =

Men's 100 metre backstroke at the 1973 World Aquatics Championships
- Dates: September 4, 1973
- Competitors: 29 from 20 nations
- Winning time: 57.47

Medalists
| gold medal | Roland Matthes | East Germany |
| silver medal | Mike Stamm | United States |
| bronze medal | Lutz Wanja | East Germany |

The men's 100 metre backstroke competition of the swimming events at the 1973 World Aquatics Championships took place on September 4.

== Records ==
Prior to the competition, the existing world and championship records were as follows.

| World record | Roland Matthes (GDR) | 56.30 | Munich, West Germany | 4 September 1972 |
| Competition record | N/A | N/A | N/A | N/A |

The following records were established during the competition:

| Date | Event | Name | Nationality | Time | Record |
|---|---|---|---|---|---|
| 4 September | Heat 1 | Lutz Wanja | East Germany | 59.53 | CR |
| 4 September | Heat 2 | John Murphy | United States | 59.33 | CR |
| 4 September | Heat 3 | Mike Stamm | United States | 59.10 | CR |
| 4 September | Heat 4 | Roland Matthes | East Germany | 58.69 | CR |
| 4 September | Final | Roland Matthes | East Germany | 57.47 | CR |

== Results ==
=== Heats ===
29 swimmers participated in 4 heats. The eight fastest times qualified for the final.

| Rank | Heat | Lane | Name | Nationality | Time | Notes |
|---|---|---|---|---|---|---|
| 1 | 4 | - | Roland Matthes | East Germany | 58.69 | Q, CR |
| 2 | 3 | - | Mike Stamm | United States | 59.10 | Q, CR |
| 3 | 2 | - | John Murphy | United States | 59.33 | Q, CR |
| 4 | 1 | - | Lutz Wanja | East Germany | 59.53 | Q, CR |
| 5 | 2 | - | Klaus Steinbach | West Germany | 59.83 | Q |
| 6 | 1 | - | László Cseh Sr. | Hungary | 59.88 | Q |
| 7 | 1 | - | Rômulo Arantes | Brazil | 1:00.17 | Q |
| 8 | 3 | - | Ian MacKenzie | Canada | 1:00.43 | Q |
| 9 | 2 | - | Zoltan Verraszto | Hungary | 1:00.49 | |
| 10 | 4 | - | Carlos Berrocal | Puerto Rico | 1:00.59 | |
| 10 | 3 | - | Mark Tonelli | Australia | 1:00.59 | |
| 12 | 4 | - | Colin Cunningham | Great Britain | 1:00.77 | |
| 13 | 1 | - | Brad Cooper | Australia | 1:00.87 | |
| 14 | 4 | - | Nenad Milos | Yugoslavia | 1:01.04 | |
| 15 | 4 | - | Steve Pickell | Canada | 1:01.33 | |
| 16 | 3 | - | Karim Ressang | Netherlands | 1:01.51 | |
| 17 | 1 | - | Predrag Milos | Yugoslavia | 1:01.56 | |
| 18 | 4 | - | Piotr Dlucik | Poland | 1:01.65 | |
| 19 | 2 | - | Anders Sandberg | Sweden | 1:01.92 | |
| 20 | 2 | - | Jean-Paul Berjeau | France | 1:02.03 | |
| 21 | 3 | - | Jorge Urreta | Mexico | 1:02.45 | |
| 22 | 4 | - | Ignacio Álvarez | Mexico | 1:02.60 | |
| 23 | 2 | - | Enrique Melo | Spain | 1:02.65 | |
| 24 | 1 | - | Ramón Volcán | Venezuela | 1:03.02 | |
| 25 | 3 | - | Helmut Podolan | Austria | 1:03.39 | |
| 26 | 3 | - | Igor Grivennikov | Soviet Union | 1:03.83 | |
| 27 | 4 | - | Carlos Santiago Bermúdez | Puerto Rico | 1:03.84 | |
| 28 | 2 | - | César Lourenco | Brazil | 1:03.95 | |
| 29 | 1 | - | Dimitar Kolarov | Bulgaria | 1:04.04 | |

=== Final ===
The results of the final are below.

| Rank | Lane | Name | Nationality | Time | Notes |
|---|---|---|---|---|---|
| 1st place, gold medalist(s) | - | Roland Matthes | East Germany | 57.47 | CR |
| 2nd place, silver medalist(s) | - | Mike Stamm | United States | 58.77 | |
| 3rd place, bronze medalist(s) | - | Lutz Wanja | East Germany | 59.08 | |
| 4 | - | John Murphy | United States | 59.37 | |
| 5 | - | László Cseh Sr. | Hungary | 59.51 | |
| 6 | - | Klaus Steinbach | West Germany | 59.77 | |
| 7 | - | Rômulo Arantes | Brazil | 1:00.37 | |
| 8 | - | Ian MacKenzie | Canada | 1:00.60 | |
