= Swimming at the 1973 World Aquatics Championships – Men's 200 metre backstroke =

Men's 200 metre backstroke at the 1973 World Aquatics Championships
- Dates: September 6, 1973
- Competitors: 29 from 19 nations
- Winning time: 2:01.87

Medalists
gold medal	Roland Matthes	East Germany
silver medal	Zoltán Verrasztó	Hungary
bronze medal	John Naber	United States

The men's 200 metre backstroke competition of the swimming events at the 1973 World Aquatics Championships took place on September 6.

== Records ==
Prior to the competition, the existing world and championship records were as follows.

World record	Roland Matthes (GDR)	2:02.82	Munich, West Germany	2 September 1972
Competition record	N/A	N/A	N/A	N/A

The following records were established during the competition:

Date	Event	Name	Nationality	Time	Record
6 September	Heat 1	Robert Williams	Australia	2:09.81	CR
6 September	Heat 3	Mark Tonelli	Australia	2:09.55	CR
6 September	Heat 4	Roland Matthes	East Germany	2:06.75	CR
6 September	Final	Roland Matthes	East Germany	2:01.87	WR

== Results ==
=== Heats ===
29 swimmers participated in 4 heats. The eight fastest times qualified for the final.

Rank	Heat	Lane	Name	Nationality	Time	Notes
1	4	-	Roland Matthes	East Germany	2:06.75	Q, CR
2	4	-	Zoltán Verrasztó	Hungary	2:07.49	Q
3	3	-	Mark Tonelli	Australia	2:09.55	Q, CR
4	1	-	Robert Williams	Australia	2:09.81	Q, CR
5	3	-	John Naber	United States	2:10.13	Q
6	2	-	Paul Hove	United States	2:10.22	Q
7	3	-	Massimo Nistri	Italy	2:11.03	Q
8	1	-	Róbert Rudolf	Hungary	2:11.22	Q
9	1	-	Colin Cunningham	Great Britain	2:11.74	
10	3	-	Lutz Wanja	East Germany	2:12.08	
11	2	-	Leif Ericsson	Sweden	2:12.09	
12	2	-	Ian MacKenzie	Canada	2:12.21	
13	1	-	Predrag Milos	Yugoslavia	2:12.38	
14	2	-	Romulo Arantes	Brazil	2:12.93	
15	4	-	Nenad Milos	Yugoslavia	2:13.48	
16	4	-	Anders Sandberg	Sweden	2:13.72	
17	2	-	Carlos Berrocal	Puerto Rico	2:14.31	
18	4	-	J. Flores	Mexico	2:14.43	
19	4	-	Karim Ressang	Netherlands	2:14.61	
20	1	-	César Lourenco	Brazil	2:15.97	
21	3	-	Eduardo Pérez	Mexico	2:16.46	
22	1	-	Steve Pickell	Canada	2:16.56	
23	4	-	Carlos Santiago	Puerto Rico	2:17.06	
24	4	-	Piotr Dlucik	Poland	2:17.30	
25	3	-	Helmut Podolan	Austria	2:18.30	
26	2	-	Ramón Volcán	Venezuela	2:20.09	
27	1	-	Evangelos Koskinas	Greece	2:24.19	
–	2	-	Ali Gharbi	Tunisia	Did not start	
–	3	-	Klaus Steinbach	West Germany	Did not start	

=== Final ===
The results of the final are below.

Rank	Lane	Name	Nationality	Time	Notes
1st place, gold medalist(s)	-	Roland Matthes	East Germany	2:01.87	WR
2nd place, silver medalist(s)	-	Zoltán Verrasztó	Hungary	2:05.89	
3rd place, bronze medalist(s)	-	John Naber	United States	2:06.91	
4	-	Robert Williams	Australia	2:08.16	
5	-	Paul Hove	United States	2:08.17	
6	-	Mark Tonelli	Australia	2:09.63	
7	-	Massimo Nistri	Italy	2:10.11	
8	-	Róbert Rudolf	Hungary	2:11.42	
