= Swimming at the 1973 World Aquatics Championships – Men's 200 metre butterfly =

Men's 200 metre butterfly at the 1973 World Aquatics Championships
- Dates: September 6, 1973
- Competitors: 27 from 20 nations
- Winning time: 2:03.32 CR

Medalists
gold medal	Robin Backhaus	United States
silver medal	Steve Gregg	United States
bronze medal	Hartmut Flöckner	East Germany

The men's 200 metre butterfly competition of the swimming events at the 1973 World Aquatics Championships took place on September 6.

== Records ==
Prior to the competition, the existing world and championship records were as follows.

World record	Mark Spitz (USA)	2:00.70	Munich, West Germany	28 August 1972
Competition record	N/A	N/A	N/A	N/A

The following records were established during the competition:

Date	Event	Name	Nationality	Time	Record
6 September	Heat 1	Brian Brinkley	United Kingdom	2:05.35	CR
6 September	Heat 2	Robin Backhaus	United States	2:04.93	CR
6 September	Heat 4	Steve Gregg	United States	2:04.59	CR
6 September	Final	Robin Backhaus	United States	2:03.32	CR

== Results ==
=== Heats ===
27 swimmers participated in 4 heats.

Rank	Heat	Lane	Name	Nationality	Time	Notes
1	4	-	Steve Gregg	United States	2:04.59	Q, CR
2	4	-	Hartmut Flöckner	East Germany	2:04.60	Q
3	2	-	Robin Backhaus	United States	2:04.93	Q, CR
4	1	-	Brian Brinkley	Great Britain	2:05.35	Q, CR
5	3	-	Jorge Delgado	Ecuador	2:05.64	Q
6	3	-	Folkert Meeuw	West Germany	2:06.04	Q
7	2	-	András Hargitay	Hungary	2:06.12	Q
8	4	-	Jorge Jaramillo	Colombia	2:07.28	Q
9	1	-	Hideaki Hara	Japan	2:07.75	
10	3	-	Ross Seymour	Australia	2:07.86	
11	1	-	Gerd Glogowsky	East Germany	2:07.87	
12	4	-	Sergey Zakharov	Soviet Union	2:08.82	
13	1	-	Miguel Lang	Spain	2:10.06	
14	2	-	Peter Tetlow	Australia	2:10.83	
15	2	-	Ignacio Álvarez	Mexico	2:11.50	
16	4	-	Csaba Sós	Hungary	2:11.60	
17	3	-	Vasil Dobrev	Bulgaria	2:11.95	
18	4	-	Angelo Tozzi	Italy	2:12.13	
19	2	-	Eduardo Alijo	Brazil	2:12.29	
20	4	-	John Duncan	Canada	2:12.39	
21	3	-	Ian Mackenzie	Canada	2:12.61	
22	2	-	Mikhail Gorelik	Soviet Union	2:14.37	
23	4	-	Eugen Almer	Romania	2:19.05	
24	2	-	Jean-Jacques Scheuren	Luxembourg	2:19.12	
25	3	-	John Daly	Puerto Rico	2:21.82	
26	1	-	José Ferraioli	Puerto Rico	2:22.21	
27	2	-	O. Mehmat	Iran	2:43.75	
–	1	-	Anders Bellbring	Sweden	Did not start	
–	3	-	Ali Gharbi	Tunisia	Did not start	
–	1	-	Sérgio Waismaun	Brazil	Did not start	

=== Final ===
The results of the final are below.

Rank	Lane	Name	Nationality	Time	Notes
1st place, gold medalist(s)	-	Robin Backhaus	United States	2:03.32	CR
2nd place, silver medalist(s)	-	Steve Gregg	United States	2:03.58	
3rd place, bronze medalist(s)	-	Hartmut Flöckner	East Germany	2:03.84	
4	-	Brian Brinkley	Great Britain	2:03.94	NR
5	-	Jorge Delgado	Ecuador	2:04.03	
6	-	András Hargitay	Hungary	2:04.10	
7	-	Folkert Meeuw	West Germany	2:05.33	
8	-	Jorge Jaramillo	Colombia	2:10.36	
