= Swimming at the 1973 World Aquatics Championships – Women's 100 metre butterfly =

Women's 100 metre butterfly at the 1973 World Aquatics Championships
- Dates: September 6, 1973
- Competitors: 30 from 22 nations
- Winning time: 1:02.539 CR

Medalists
gold medal	Kornelia Ender	East Germany
silver medal	Rosemarie Kother	East Germany
bronze medal	Mayumi Aoki	Japan

The women's 100 metre butterfly competition of the swimming events at the 1973 World Aquatics Championships took place on September 6.

== Records ==
Prior to the competition, the existing world and championship records were as follows.

World record	Kornelia Ender (GDR)	1:02.31	East Berlin, East Germany	14 July 1973
Competition record	N/A	N/A	N/A	N/A

The following records were established during the competition:

Date	Event	Name	Nationality	Time	Record
6 September	Heat	Debra Cain	Australia	1:07.776	CR
6 September	Heat	Mayumi Aoki	Japan	1:03.803	CR
6 September	Heat	Rosemarie Kother	East Germany	1:02.951	CR
6 September	Final	Kornelia Ender	East Germany	1:02.539	CR

== Results ==
=== Heats ===
30 swimmers participated in 4 heats.

Rank	Heat	Lane	Name	Nationality	Time	Notes
1	3	-	Rosemarie Kother	East Germany	1:02.951	Q, CR
2	2	-	Mayumi Aoki	Japan	1:03.803	Q, CR
3	2	-	Deena Deardurff	United States	1:04.135	Q
4	4	-	Kornelia Ender	East Germany	1:04.140	Q
5	4	-	Peggy Tosdal	United States	1:04.330	Q
6	3	-	Gudrun Beckmann	West Germany	1:05.336	Q
7	4	-	Donatella Talpo	Italy	1:05.830	Q
8	4	-	Gunilla Andersson	Sweden	1:05.970	Q
9	3	-	Aleksandra Meerzon	Soviet Union	1:06.383	
10	3	-	Sandra Yost	Australia	1:06.626	
11	4	-	Anca Groza	Romania	1:06.950	
12	2	-	A. Segaar	Netherlands	1:07.069	
13	1	-	Debra Cain	Australia	1:07.776	CR
14	3	-	Patti Stenhouse	Canada	1:07.792	
15	1	-	Vera Faitlova	Czechoslovakia	1:07.935	
16	4	-	Ileana Morales	Venezuela	1:08.100	
17	1	-	Nataliya Popova	Soviet Union	1:08.198	
18	3	-	Rosemary Peres	Brazil	1:08.405	
19	4	-	E. Majnaric	Yugoslavia	1:08.490	
20	2	-	Aurora Chamorro	Spain	1:08.587	
21	3	-	M. Corsi	Italy	1:08.613	
22	1	-	Irène Debrunner	Switzerland	1:08.672	
23	4	-	M. Saavedra	Colombia	1:09.230	
24	2	-	Marianela Huen	Venezuela	1:09.401	
25	2	-	Cathy Whiting	New Zealand	1:09.443	
26	3	-	V. Valent	Hungary	1:09.514	
27	1	-	Janet Slavcheva	Bulgaria	1:09.617	
28	1	-	J. Mross	Brazil	1:09.755	
29	2	-	Joanne DePape	Canada	1:09.867	
30	1	-	María Mock	Puerto Rico	1:10.562	

=== Final ===
The results of the final are below.

Rank	Lane	Name	Nationality	Time	Notes
1st place, gold medalist(s)	6	Kornelia Ender	East Germany	1:02.539	CR
2nd place, silver medalist(s)	4	Rosemarie Kother	East Germany	1:02.687	
3rd place, bronze medalist(s)	5	Mayumi Aoki	Japan	1:03.739	
4	3	Deena Deardurff	United States	1:04.272	
5	2	Peggy Tosdal	United States	1:04.329	
6	7	Gudrun Beckmann	West Germany	1:04.937	
7	1	Donatella Talpo	Italy	1:06.353	
8	8	Gunilla Andersson	Sweden	1:06.386	
