= Swimming at the 1973 World Aquatics Championships – Men's 100 metre freestyle =

Men's 100 metre freestyle at the 1973 World Aquatics Championships
- Dates: September 9, 1973
- Competitors: 38 from 25 nations
- Winning time: 51.708

Medalists
gold medal	Jim Montgomery	United States
silver medal	Michel Rousseau	France
bronze medal	Michael Wenden	Australia

The men's 100 metre freestyle competition of the swimming events at the 1973 World Aquatics Championships took place on September 9.

== Records ==
Prior to the competition, the existing world and championship records were as follows.

World record	Mark Spitz (USA)	51.22	Munich, West Germany	3 September 1972
Competition record	N/A	N/A	N/A	N/A

The following records were established during the competition:

Date	Event	Name	Nationality	Time	Record
9 September	Heat	Ruy de Oliveira	Brazil	53.675	CR
9 September	Heat	Michael Wenden	Australia	52.671	CR
9 September	Heat	Jim Montgomery	United States	52.660	CR
9 September	Final	Jim Montgomery	United States	51.708	CR

== Results ==
=== Heats ===
38 swimmers participated in 6 heats, qualified swimmers are listed:

Rank	Heat	Lane	Name	Nationality	Time	Notes
1	3	-	Jim Montgomery	United States	52.660	Q, CR
2	2	-	Michael Wenden	Australia	52.671	Q, CR
3	5	-	Vladimir Bure	Soviet Union	52.771	Q
4	6	-	Klaus Steinbach	West Germany	52.986	Q
5	6	-	Michel Rousseau	France	53.041	Q
6	4	-	John Murphy	United States	53.162	Q
7	4	-	Roger Pyttel	East Germany	53.539	Q
8	1	-	Ruy de Oliveira	Brazil	53.675	Q, CR
9	5	-	Roberto Pangaro	Italy	53.877	
10	5	-	Bruce Robertson	Canada	53.908	
11	5	-	Peter Nocke	West Germany	53.939	
12	3	-	Fritz Warncke	Norway	54.018	
13	3	-	Peter Bruch	East Germany	54.120	
14	2	-	José Aranha	Brazil	54.157	
15	4	-	Jorge Comas	Spain	54.237	
16	6	-	Mirek Hrouda	Czechoslovakia	54.240	
17	6	-	Neil Rogers	Australia	54.505	
18	6	-	Igor Grivennikov	Soviet Union	54.584	
19	3	-	Marcello Guarducci	Italy	54.631	
20	2	-	Bernt Zarnowiecki	Sweden	54.658	
21	2	-	Goran Jansson	Sweden	54.836	
22	6	-	Stefan Georgiev	Bulgaria	55.064	
23	2	-	Rene Lustig	Yugoslavia	55.236	
24	1	-	Brian Phillips	Canada	55.708	
25	3	-	Jovan Kovacic	Yugoslavia	55.735	
26	3	-	Gianni Versari	Panama	55.970	
27	4	-	István Szentirmay	Hungary	56.071	
28	4	-	Lyudmil Stoev	Bulgaria	56.236	
29	4	-	Ali Charbi	Tunisia	56.239	
30	5	-	Pierre-Yves Copin	France	56.278	
31	1	-	Eduardo Orejuela	Ecuador	56.500	
32	2	-	Ramón Volcán	Venezuela	57.065	
33	2	-	José Ferraioli	Puerto Rico	57.081	
34	1	-	Ali Kinawi	Egypt	57.283	
35	3	-	Carlos Santiago	Puerto Rico	57.699	
36	1	-	Mehmet Dilmac	Turkey	58.514	
-	4	-	Z. Opritescu	Romania	DNS / DSQ	
-	5	-	Marian Slavic	Romania	DNS / DSQ	

=== Final ===
The results of the final are below.

Rank	Lane	Name	Nationality	Time	Notes
1st place, gold medalist(s)	4	Jim Montgomery	United States	51.708	CR
2nd place, silver medalist(s)	2	Michel Rousseau	France	52.086	
3rd place, bronze medalist(s)	5	Michael Wenden	Australia	52.222	
4	3	Vladimir Bure	Soviet Union	52.522	
5	7	John Murphy	United States	52.732	
6	6	Klaus Steinbach	West Germany	52.820	
7	1	Roger Pyttel	East Germany	53.253	
8	8	Ruy de Oliveira	Brazil	53.701	
