= Swimming at the 1973 World Aquatics Championships – Women's 200 metre individual medley =

Women's 200 metre individual medley at the 1973 World Aquatics Championships
- Dates: September 4, 1973
- Competitors: 30 from 22 nations
- Winning time: 2:20.51 WR

Medalists
gold medal	Andrea Hübner	East Germany
silver medal	Kornelia Ender	East Germany
bronze medal	Kathy Heddy	United States

The women's 200 metre individual medley competition of the swimming events at the 1973 World Aquatics Championships took place on September 4.

== Records ==
Prior to the competition, the existing world and championship records were as follows.

World record	Kornelia Ender (GDR)	2:23.01	East Berlin, East Germany	13 April 1973
Competition record	N/A	N/A	N/A	N/A

The following records were established during the competition:

Date	Event	Name	Nationality	Time	Record
4 September	Heat 1	Leslie Cliff	Canada	2:28.84	CR
4 September	Heat 2	Kathy Heddy	United States	2:28.30	CR
4 September	Heat 3	Andrea Hübner	East Germany	2:24.16	CR
4 September	Final	Andrea Hübner	East Germany	2:20.51	WR

== Results ==
=== Heats ===
30 swimmers participated in 4 heats, qualified swimmers are listed:

Rank	Heat	Lane	Name	Nationality	Time	Notes
1	3	-	Andrea Hübner	East Germany	2:24.16	Q, CR
2	4	-	Kornelia Ender	East Germany	2:25.31	Q
3	3	-	Novella Calligaris	Italy	2:26.49	Q
4	3	-	Debra Cain	Australia	2:26.72	Q
5	2	-	Kathy Heddy	United States	2:28.30	Q
6	4	-	Julie Woodcock	United States	2:28.66	Q
7	1	-	Leslie Cliff	Canada	2:28.84	Q
8	4	-	Yukari Takemoto	Japan	2:29.55	Q
9	3	-	Susan Hunter	New Zealand	2:29.99	
10	2	-	Judy Wright	Canada	2:30.03	
11	1	-	Karin Bormann	West Germany	2:30.19	
12	1	-	Anita Zarnowiecki	Sweden	2:30.48	
13	2	-	Trine Krogh	Norway	2:31.28	
14	4	-	Nataliya Popova	Soviet Union	2:32.23	
15	4	-	Gail Neall	Australia	2:32.72	
16	4	-	Helga Niemann	West Germany	2:32.95	
17	2	-	Marina Malyutina	Soviet Union	2:32.95	
18	1	-	Olga Chlupova	Czechoslovakia	2:33.09	
19	4	-	Gisela Cerezo	Venezuela	2:33.93	
20	3	-	Jasna Efendic	Yugoslavia	2:34.73	
21	2	-	Maria Isabel Guerra	Brazil	2:36.42	
22	3	-	Naoko Shio	Japan	2:36.97	
23	1	-	Nieves Panadell	Spain	2:37.43	
24	1	-	Roselina Angee	Colombia	2:37.97	
25	1	-	Eleni Avlonitou	Greece	2:39.44	
26	4	-	García Borras	Argentina	2:39.94	
27	3	-	María Mock	Puerto Rico	2:40.55	
28	2	-	Angela López	Puerto Rico	2:44.44	
29	1	-	Myriam Mizouni	Tunisia	2:45.52	
–	3	-	Gabriella Verraszto	Hungary		DNS / DQ

=== Final ===
The results of the final are below.

Rank	Lane	Name	Nationality	Time	Notes
1st place, gold medalist(s)	-	Andrea Hübner	East Germany	2:20.51	WR
2nd place, silver medalist(s)	-	Kornelia Ender	East Germany	2:21.21	
3rd place, bronze medalist(s)	-	Kathy Heddy	United States	2:23.84	
4	-	Novella Calligaris	Italy	2:24.07	
5	-	Julie Woodcock	United States	2:25.72	
6	-	Leslie Cliff	Canada	2:26.26	
7	-	Yukari Takemoto	Japan	2:26.47	
8	-	Debra Cain	Australia	2:26.63	
