= Swimming at the 1973 World Aquatics Championships – Women's 100 metre freestyle =

Women's 100 metre freestyle at the 1973 World Aquatics Championships
- Dates: September 9, 1973
- Competitors: 35 from 25 nations
- Winning time: 57.542

Medalists
| gold medal | Kornelia Ender | East Germany |
| silver medal | Shirley Babashoff | United States |
| bronze medal | Enith Brigitha | Netherlands |

The women's 100 metre freestyle competition of the swimming events at the 1973 World Aquatics Championships took place on September 9.

== Records ==
Prior to the competition, the existing world and championship records were as follows.

| World record | Kornelia Ender (GDR) | 58.12 | Utrecht, Netherlands | 18 August 1973 |
| Competition record | N/A | N/A | N/A | N/A |

The following records were established during the competition:

| Date | Event | Name | Nationality | Time | Record |
|---|---|---|---|---|---|
| 8 September | Heat 1 | Andrea Eife | East Germany | 59.61 | CR |
| 8 September | Heat 3 | Shirley Babashoff | United States | 59.40 | CR |
| 8 September | Heat 4 | Enith Brigitha | Netherlands | 59.16 | CR |
| 8 September | Final | Kornelia Ender | East Germany | 57.54 | WR |

== Results ==
=== Heats ===
35 swimmers participated in 5 heats, qualified swimmers are listed:

| Rank | Heat | Lane | Name | Nationality | Time | Notes |
|---|---|---|---|---|---|---|
| 1 | 4 | - | Enith Brigitha | Netherlands | 59.166 | Q, CR |
| 2 | 3 | - | Shirley Babashoff | United States | 59.406 | Q, CR |
| 3 | 1 | - | Andrea Eife | East Germany | 59.610 | Q, CR |
| 4 | 5 | - | Kornelia Ender | East Germany | 59.695 | Q |
| 5 | 5 | - | Jutta Weber | West Germany | 59.830 | Q |
| 6 | 2 | - | Kathy Heddy | United States | 1:00.000 | Q |
| 7 | 4 | - | Françoise Monod | Switzerland | 1:00.461 | Q |
| 8 | 1 | - | Guylaine Berger | France | 1:00.542 | Q |
| 9 | 5 | - | Grethe Mathiesen | Norway | 1:00.825 | |
| 10 | 1 | - | Laura Podesta | Italy | 1:01.021 | |
| 11 | 3 | - | Eva Andersson | Sweden | 1:01.126 | |
| 12 | 4 | - | Angela Steinbach | West Germany | 1:01.153 | |
| 13 | 1 | - | Lucy Burle | Brazil | 1:01.351 | |
| 14 | 3 | - | Veronica Stel | Netherlands | 1:01.557 | |
| 15 | 5 | - | Wendy Cook | Canada | 1:01.708 | |
| 16 | 5 | - | T. Zolotnickaia | Soviet Union | 1:01.716 | |
| 17 | 4 | - | Debra Cain | Australia | 1:01.990 | |
| 18 | 3 | - | Suzy Anderson | Australia | 1:02.067 | |
| 19 | 2 | - | Chantal Schertz | France | 1:02.134 | |
| 20 | 2 | - | Gunilla Lundberg | Sweden | 1:02.173 | |
| 21 | 4 | - | Magdolna Patóh | Hungary | 1:02.874 | |
| 22 | 4 | - | Olga Chlupova | Czechoslovakia | 1:02.905 | |
| 23 | 2 | - | Jasna Efendic | Yugoslavia | 1:03.039 | |
| 24 | 3 | - | Tamara Shelofastova | Soviet Union | 1:03.198 | |
| 25 | 5 | - | Cathy Whiting | New Zealand | 1:03.214 | |
| 26 | 1 | - | Leslie Cliff | Canada | 1:03.237 | |
| 27 | 5 | - | E. Pilawska | Poland | 1:03.694 | |
| 28 | 3 | - | M. Saavedra | Colombia | 1:04.486 | |
| 29 | 4 | - | Leslie Thompson | Puerto Rico | 1:04.630 | |
| 30 | 4 | - | Marianela Huen | Venezuela | 1:05.195 | |
| 31 | 2 | - | B. Garcia | Argentina | 1:06.450 | |
| 32 | 3 | - | María Mock | Puerto Rico | 1:07.092 | |
| 33 | 1 | - | Myriam Mizouni | Tunisia | 1:07.332 | |
| 34 | 5 | - | N. Pahiya | Turkey | 1:08.946 | |
| 35 | 1 | - | H. Nastaren | Iran | 1:17.303 | |

=== Final ===
The results of the final are below.

| Rank | Lane | Name | Nationality | Time | Notes |
|---|---|---|---|---|---|
| 1st place, gold medalist(s) | 6 | Kornelia Ender | East Germany | 57.542 | WR |
| 2nd place, silver medalist(s) | 5 | Shirley Babashoff | United States | 58.876 | |
| 3rd place, bronze medalist(s) | 4 | Enith Brigitha | Netherlands | 58.879 | |
| 4 | 3 | Andrea Eife | East Germany | 58.931 | |
| 5 | 8 | Guylaine Berger | France | 59.518 | |
| 6 | 2 | Jutta Weber | West Germany | 59.585 | |
| 7 | 7 | Kathy Heddy | United States | 59.900 | |
| 8 | 1 | Françoise Monod | Switzerland | 1:01.240 | |
