= Indonesia at the 2025 World Aquatics Championships =

- Flag of Indonesia
- World Aquatics code: INA
- National federation: Indonesia Swimming Federation

in Singapore
- Competitors: 21 in 4 sports
- Medals: Gold 0 Silver 0 Bronze 0 Total 0

World Aquatics Championships appearances
- 1973; 1975; 1978; 1982; 1986; 1991; 1994; 1998; 2001; 2003; 2005; 2007; 2009; 2011; 2013; 2015; 2017; 2019; 2022; 2023; 2024; 2025

Indonesia competed at the 2025 World Aquatics Championships in Singapore from July 11 to August 3, 2025.

== Competitors ==
The following is the list of competitors in the Championships.

Sport	Men	Women	Total
Artistic swimming	0	10	10
Diving	2	2	4
Open water swimming	3	2	5
Swimming	2	0	2
Total	7	14	21

== Artistic swimming ==
Women

Athlete	Event	Preliminaries		Final	
Athlete	Event	Points	Rank	Points	Rank
Hilda Tri Julyandra	Solo technical routine	175.7333	32	Did not advance	
Hilda Tri Julyandra	Solo free routine	132.6663	27	Did not advance	
Hilda Tri Julyandra; Talitha Amabelle Putri Subeni	Duet technical routine	185.7741	36	Did not advance	
Hilda Tri Julyandra; Talitha Amabelle Putri Subeni	Duet free routine	128.2740	35	Did not advance	

Mixed

Athlete	Event	Preliminaries		Final	
Athlete	Event	Points	Rank	Points	Rank
Mutiara Nur Azizah; Amandha Mutiara Putri; Aulia Mustika Putri; Rani Asriani Rahman; Rasya Annisa Rahman; Khansa Fathiyyah Zahrani Saman; Nurfa Nurul Utami; Nawrah Qanitah Zhafirah	Team technical routine	136.4583	26	Did not advance	
Mutiara Nur Azizah; Amandha Mutiara Putri; Aulia Mustika Putri; Rani Asriani Rahman; Rasya Annisa Rahman; Khansa Fathiyyah Zahrani Saman; Nurfa Nurul Utami; Nawrah Qanitah Zhafirah	Team free routine	126.6905	19	Did not advance	

== Diving ==
Men

Athlete	Event	Preliminaries		Semifinals		Final	
Athlete	Event	Points	Rank	Points	Rank	Points	Rank
Andriyan; Muhamad Yudha Prastiyo	10 m synchro platform	297.30	20	—		Did not advance	

Women

Athlete	Event	Preliminaries		Semifinals		Final	
Athlete	Event	Points	Rank	Points	Rank	Points	Rank
Gladies Lariesa Garina	1 m springboard	209.05	36	—		Did not advance	
Gladies Lariesa Garina	3 m springboard	220.10	38	Did not advance			
Nur Mufiidah Sudirman	1 m springboard	151.30	50	—		Did not advance	
Gladies Lariesa Garina; Nur Mufiidah Sudirman	3 m synchro springboard	179.37	21	—		Did not advance	

Mixed

Athlete	Event	Final	
Athlete	Event	Points	Rank
Andriyan; Gladies Lariesa Garina	3 m synchro springboard	229.20	13
Andriyan; Gladies Lariesa Garina; Muhamad Yudha Prastiyo	Team event	273.30	17

== Open water swimming ==
Men

Athlete	Event	Heat		Semi-final		Final	
Athlete	Event	Time	Rank	Time	Rank	Time	Rank
Alexander Adrian	Men's 10 km	—				Did not finish	
Mochammad Akbar Putra Taufik	Men's 5 km	—				1:04:27.6	59
Aflah Fadlan Prawira	Men's 10 km	—				2:19:35.0	55

Women

Athlete	Event	Heat		Semi-final		Final	
Athlete	Event	Time	Rank	Time	Rank	Time	Rank
Izzy Dwifaiva Hefrisyanthi	Women's 5 km	—				1:11:50.4	52
Desak Nyo Pradnyaswari Dewi	Women's 5 km	—				OTL	

== Swimming ==
Indonesia entered 2 swimmers.

Men

Athlete	Event	Heat		Semi-final		Final	
Athlete	Event	Time	Rank	Time	Rank	Time	Rank
Felix Viktor Iberle	50 m breaststroke	27.81	39	Did not advance			
I Gede Siman Sudartawa	50 m backstroke	26.11	51	Did not advance			
