= Canada at the 1973 World Aquatics Championships =

- Flag of Canada
- FINA code: CAN
- National federation: Aquatic Federation of Canada
- Website: aquaticscanadaaquatiques.com

in Belgrade, Yugoslavia
- Medals Ranked 6th: Gold 1 Silver 3 Bronze 2 Total 6

World Aquatics Championships appearances
- 1973; 1975; 1978; 1982; 1986; 1991; 1994; 1998; 2001; 2003; 2005; 2007; 2009; 2011; 2013; 2015; 2017; 2019; 2022; 2023; 2024

Canada competed at the 1973 World Aquatics Championships in Belgrade, Yugoslavia from August 31 to September 9.

== Medallists ==
Medal	Name	Sport	Event	Date
Gold	Bruce Robertson	Swimming	Men's 100 m butterfly	8 September
Bronze	Wendy Hogg	Swimming	Women's 100 m backstroke	5 September
Bronze	Canadian team Ian MacKenzie; Peter Hrdlitschka; Bruce Robertson; Brian Phillips	Swimming	Men's 4 × 100 m medley relay	9 September

== Diving ==
Athlete	Event	Preliminaries		Final	
Athlete	Event	Points	Rank	Points	Rank
Ken Armstrong	Men's springboard	466.08	13	did not advance	
Scott Cranham	Men's springboard	503.49	8 Q	485.76	8
Scott Cranham	Men's platform	456.91	8 Q	470.88	8
Glenn Grout	Men's platform	405.75	19	did not advance	
Cindy Shatto	Women's springboard	371.73	11	did not advance	
Beverly Boys	Women's springboard	389.31	8 Q	383.55	7
Beverly Boys	Women's platform	342.99	6 Q	324.18	8
Linda Cuthbert	Women's platform	328.59	11	did not advance	

== Swimming ==
Men

Athlete	Event	Heat		Final	
Athlete	Event	Time	Rank	Time	Rank
Bruce Robertson	100 m freestyle	53.90	10	did not advance	
Bruce Robertson	200 m freestyle	1:58.21	14	did not advance	
Bruce Robertson	100 m butterfly	56.90	3 Q	55.69 CR	1st place, gold medalist(s)
Brian Phillips	100 m freestyle	55.70	24	did not advance	
Brian Phillips	100 m butterfly	58.68	11	did not advance	
Ian MacKenzie	200 m freestyle	1:59.51	18	did not advance	
Ian MacKenzie	100 m backstroke	1:00.43	8 Q	1:00.60	8
Ian MacKenzie	200 m backstroke	2:12.21	12	did not advance	
Ian MacKenzie	200 m butterfly	2:12.61	21	did not advance	
Deane Buckboro	400 m freestyle	4:11.72	11	did not advance	
Deane Buckboro	1500 m freestyle	—		16:55.79	16
Michael Ker	400 m freestyle	4:20.10	20	did not advance	
Michael Ker	1500 m freestyle	—		17:00.62	17
Steve Pickell	100 m backstroke	1:01.33	15	did not advance	
Steve Pickell	200 m backstroke	2:16.56	22	did not advance	
Peter Hrdlitschka	100 m backstroke	1:08.62	12	did not advance	
Peter Hrdlitschka	200 m backstroke	2:31.34	14	did not advance	
Mel Zajac	100 m backstroke	1:09.97	22	did not advance	
Mel Zajac	200 m backstroke	2:33.15	18	did not advance	
John Duncan	200 m butterfly	2:12.39	20	did not advance	
Paul Hughes	400 m individual medley	4:52.00	20	did not advance	
David Brumwell	200 m individual medley	2:14.99	12	did not advance	
David Brumwell	400 m individual medley	4:45.52	12	did not advance	
Canadian team	4 × 100 m freestyle relay	3:36.91	9	did not advance	
Canadian team	4 × 200 m freestyle relay	7:58.43	9	did not advance	
Ian MacKenzie; Peter Hrdlitschka; Bruce Robertson; Brian Phillips	4 × 100 m medley relay	4:00.35	5 Q	3:56.371	3rd place, bronze medalist(s)

Women

Athlete	Event	Heat		Final	
Athlete	Event	Time	Rank	Time	Rank
Wendy Hogg	100 m freestyle	1:01.70	15	did not advance	
Wendy Hogg	100 m backstroke	1:06.27	4 Q	1:06.27	3rd place, bronze medalist(s)
Wendy Hogg	200 m backstroke	2:23.12 CR	2 Q	2:23.59	6
Leslie Cliff	100 m freestyle	1:03.23	26	did not advance	
Leslie Cliff	200 m freestyle	2:11.50	11	did not advance	
Leslie Cliff	800 m freestyle	—		9:27.64	11
Leslie Cliff	200 m individual medley	2:28.84 CR	7 Q	2:26.26	6
Leslie Cliff	400 m individual medley	5:10.09	6 Q	5:07.01	4
Brenda Holmes	200 m freestyle	2:14.43	16	did not advance	
Janice Stenhouse	400 m freestyle	4:32.04	8 Q	4:31.92	7
Anne Marie McCaffrey	400 m freestyle	4:37.11	12	did not advance	
Anne Marie McCaffrey	800 m freestyle	—		9:23.50	10
Donna Gurr	100 m backstroke	1:08.64	12	did not advance	
Donna Gurr	200 m backstroke	2:30.86	14	did not advance	
Sylvia Deschamps	100 m breaststroke	1:18.14	10	did not advance	
Marian Stuart	100 m breaststroke	1:19.57	14	did not advance	
Marian Stuart	200 m breaststroke	2:50.01	13	did not advance	
Sandra Seath	200 m breaststroke	2:53.02	18	did not advance	
Patti Stenhouse	100 m butterfly	1:07.79	14	did not advance	
Patti Stenhouse	200 m butterfly	2:25.30	10	did not advance	
Joanne DePape	100 m butterfly	1:09.86	29	did not advance	
Jennifer McHugh	200 m butterfly	2:32.90	23	did not advance	
Jennifer McHugh	400 m individual medley	5:21.26	16	did not advance	
Judy Wright	200 m individual medley	2:30.03	10	did not advance	
Gail Amundrud; Judy Wright; Wendy Cook; Leslie Cliff	4 × 100 m freestyle relay	4:01.44	3 Q	4:00.20	4
Wendy Cook; Mary Stewart; Patti Stenhouse; Gail Amundrud	4 × 100 m medley relay	4:34.05	7 Q	4:29.60	5
