= Australia at the 1973 World Aquatics Championships =

- Flag of Australia
- World Aquatics code: AUS
- National federation: Swimming Australia
- Website: swimming.org.au

in Belgrade, Yugoslavia
- Medals Ranked 7th: Gold 1 Silver 2 Bronze 2 Total 5

World Aquatics Championships appearances
- 1973; 1975; 1978; 1982; 1986; 1991; 1994; 1998; 2001; 2003; 2005; 2007; 2009; 2011; 2013; 2015; 2017; 2019; 2022; 2023; 2024; 2025

Australia competed at the 1973 World Aquatics Championships in Belgrade, Yugoslavia from August 31 to September 9.

== Medalists ==
Medal	Name	Sport	Event	Date
Gold	Stephen Holland	Swimming	Men's 1500 m freestyle	September 8
Silver	Brad Cooper	Swimming	Men's 400 m freestyle	September 6
Silver	Australian team Michael Wenden; Steve Badger; Neil Rogers; John Kulasalu	Swimming	Men's 4 × 200 m freestyle relay	September 7
Bronze	Michael Wenden	Swimming	Men's 100 m freestyle	September 9
Bronze	Brad Cooper	Swimming	Men's 1500 m freestyle	September 8

== Diving ==
Athlete	Event	Preliminaries		Final	
Athlete	Event	Points	Rank	Points	Rank
Ken Grove	Men's springboard	449.01	15	did not advance	
Ken Grove	Men's platform	434.61	13	did not advance	
Madeleine Barnett	Women's springboard	353.76	13	did not advance	
Madeleine Barnett	Women's platform	330.33	10	did not advance	

== Swimming ==
Men

Athlete	Event	Heat		Final	
Athlete	Event	Time	Rank	Time	Rank
Neil Rogers	100 m freestyle	54.50	17	did not advance	
Neil Rogers	100 m butterfly	57.98	8 Q	57.58	7
Michael Wenden	100 m freestyle	52.67 CR	2 Q	52.22	3rd place, bronze medalist(s)
Michael Wenden	200 m freestyle	1:58.26	15	did not advance	
Steve Badger	200 m freestyle	1:58.26	15	did not advance	
Steve Badger	200 m individual medley	2:16.42	15	did not advance	
Brad Cooper	400 m freestyle	4:02.38 CR	1 Q	3:58.70	2nd place, silver medalist(s)
Brad Cooper	1500 m freestyle	—		15:45.04	3rd place, bronze medalist(s)
Brad Cooper	100 m backstroke	1:00.87	13	did not advance	
John Kulasalu	400 m freestyle	4:09.32	8 Q	4:14.62	8
Stephen Holland	1500 m freestyle	—		15:31.85 WR	1st place, gold medalist(s)
Mark Tonelli	100 m backstroke	1:00.59	10	did not advance	
Mark Tonelli	200 m backstroke	2:09.55 CR	3 Q	2:09.63	6
Robert Williams	200 m backstroke	2:09.81 CR	4 Q	2:08.16	4
Michael Creswick	100 m breaststroke	1:09.81	19	did not advance	
Michael Creswick	200 m breaststroke	2:33.34	19	did not advance	
Ross Seymour	100 m butterfly	57.58	6 Q	57.33	5
Ross Seymour	200 m butterfly	2:07.86	10	did not advance	
Peter Tetlow	200 m butterfly	2:10.83	14	did not advance	
Peter Tetlow	200 m individual medley	2:19.71	22	did not advance	
Peter Tetlow	400 m individual medley	4:51.98	18	did not advance	
Neil Martin	200 m individual medley	2:17.01	18	did not advance	
Neil Martin	400 m individual medley	4:44.55	9	did not advance	
Michael Wenden; Steve Badger; Neil Rogers; John Kulasalu	4 × 100 m freestyle relay	3:36.56 NR	8 Q	3:35.27 NR	6
Michael Wenden; Steve Badger; Neil Rogers; John Kulasalu	4 × 200 m freestyle relay	7:48.43 CR	1 Q	7:43.65	2nd place, silver medalist(s)
Brad Cooper; Michael Creswick; Ross Seymour; Michael Wenden	4 × 100 m medley relay	4:02.97	8 Q	3:58.59	6

Women

Athlete	Event	Heat		Final	
Athlete	Event	Time	Rank	Time	Rank
Debra Cain	100 m freestyle	1:01.99	17	did not advance	
Debra Cain	200 m backstroke	2:24.96	6 Q	2:24.26	7
Debra Cain	100 m butterfly	1:07.77 CR	13	did not advance	
Debra Cain	200 m individual medley	2:26.72	4 Q	2:26.63	8
Suzy Anderson	100 m freestyle	1:02.06	18	did not advance	
Suzy Anderson	200 m freestyle	2:11.17	9	did not advance	
Virginia Rickard	200 m freestyle	2:09.93	5 Q	2:07.88	4
Virginia Rickard	400 m freestyle	4:24.99 CR	2 Q	4:23.48	4
Narelle Moras	400 m freestyle	4:30.28	6 Q	4:34.94	8
Narelle Moras	800 m freestyle	—		9:09.93	5
Sandra Yost	800 m freestyle	—		9:22.49	8
Sandra Yost	100 m butterfly	1:06.62	10	did not advance	
Sandra Yost	200 m butterfly	2:21.82 CR	4 Q	2:22.32	5
Linda Young	100 m backstroke	1:08.01	10	did not advance	
Linda Young	200 m backstroke	2:25.94	9	did not advance	
Sue Lewis	100 m backstroke	1:09.54	15	did not advance	
Judith Hudson	100 m breaststroke	1:19.21	12	did not advance	
Judith Hudson	200 m breaststroke	2:49.66	12	did not advance	
Beverley Whitfield	100 m breaststroke	1:19.39	13	did not advance	
Beverley Whitfield	200 m breaststroke	2:46.96	9	did not advance	
Gail Neall	200 m butterfly	2:25.81	11	did not advance	
Gail Neall	200 m individual medley	2:32.72	15	did not advance	
Gail Neall	400 m individual medley	5:17.96	14	did not advance	
Debra Cain; Suzy Anderson; Virginia Rickard; Narelle Moras	4 × 100 m freestyle relay	4:08.71	11	did not advance	
Linda Young; Beverley Whitfield; Debra Cain; Suzy Anderson	4 × 100 m medley relay	4:33.74	6	4:34.45	8
