= Diving at the 1973 World Aquatics Championships – Women's 3 metre springboard =

Women's 3 metre springboard at the 1973 World Aquatics Championships
- Venue: Tašmajdan Sports and Recreation Center
- Location: Belgrade, Yugoslavia
- Dates: 2–3 September
- Competitors: 24 from 14 nations
- Winning points: 442.17

Medalists
gold medal	Christa Köhler	East Germany
silver medal	Ulrika Knape	Sweden
bronze medal	Marina Janicke	East Germany

The women's 3-metre springboard competition at the 1973 World Aquatics Championships was held on 2 and 3 September 1973.

== Results ==
Green denotes finalists

Rank	Diver	Nationality	Preliminary		Final	
Rank	Diver	Nationality	Points	Rank	Points	Rank
1st place, gold medalist(s)	Christa Köhler	East Germany	405.51	3	442.17	1
2nd place, silver medalist(s)	Ulrika Knape	Sweden	420.24	1	434.19	2
3rd place, bronze medalist(s)	Marina Janicke	East Germany	394.02	5	426.33	3
4	Agneta Henrikson	Sweden	389.31	7	407.47	4
5	Alison Drake	Great Britain	392.94	6	403.50	5
6	Carrie Irish	United States	411.12	2	385.98	6
7	Beverly Boys	Canada	389.31	8	383.55	7
8	Jennifer Chandler	United States	401.10	4	375.06	8
9	Milena Duchkova	Czechoslovakia	384.03	9	did not advance	
10	Tamara Safonova	Soviet Union	380.88	10	did not advance	
11	Cindy Shatto	Canada	371.73	11	did not advance	
12	Elzbieta Wiernijuk	Poland	371.55	12	did not advance	
13	Madeleine Barnett	Australia	353.76	13	did not advance	
14	Helen Koppell	Great Britain	351.21	14	did not advance	
15	Yelena Yemelyanova	Soviet Union	345.87	15	did not advance	
16	Giovanna Marchi	Italy	340.71	16	did not advance	
17	Ursula Mockel	West Germany	331.92	17	did not advance	
18	Michaela Herweck	West Germany	329.88	18	did not advance	
19	Sorana Prelipceanu	Romania	326.70	19	did not advance	
20	Milena Tomackova	Czechoslovakia	307.80	20	did not advance	
21	Melanija Decusara	Romania	290.85	21	did not advance	
22	Norma Baraldi	Mexico	284.91	22	did not advance	
23	Alicija Rivera	Mexico	269.88	23	did not advance	
24	Myrnawati Hardjolukito	Indonesia	248.55	24	did not advance	
