= Diving at the 1973 World Aquatics Championships – Women's 10 metre platform =

Women's 10 metre platform at the 1973 World Aquatics Championships
- Venue: Tašmajdan Sports and Recreation Center
- Location: Belgrade, Yugoslavia
- Dates: 6–7 September
- Competitors: 21 from 14 nations
- Winning points: 442.17

Medalists
gold medal	Ulrika Knape	Sweden
silver medal	Milena Duchkova	Czechoslovakia
bronze medal	Irina Kalinina	Soviet Union

The Women's 10 metre platform competition at the 1973 World Aquatics Championships was held on 6 and 7 September 1973.

== Results ==
Green denotes finalists

Rank	Diver	Nationality	Preliminary		Final	
Rank	Diver	Nationality	Points	Rank	Points	Rank
1st place, gold medalist(s)	Ulrika Knape	Sweden	390.42	2	406.77	1
2nd place, silver medalist(s)	Milena Duchkova	Czechoslovakia	352.20	5	387.18	2
3rd place, bronze medalist(s)	Ilina Kalinina	Soviet Union	370.50	3	381.42	3
4	Barbara Schaefer	United States	339.66	7	367.08	4
5	Marina Janicke	East Germany	393.57	1	365.73	5
6	Sylvia Fiedler	East Germany	365.91	4	355.59	6
7	Deborah Wilson	United States	338.16	8	343.05	7
8	Beverly Boys	Canada	342.99	6	324.18	8
9	Yelena Yemelyanova	Soviet Union	337.56	9	did not advance	
10	Madeleine Barnett	Australia	330.33	10	did not advance	
11	Linda Cuthbert	Canada	328.59	11	did not advance	
12	Beverly Williams	Great Britain	324.87	12	did not advance	
13	Elzbieta Wiernijuk	Poland	313.44	13	did not advance	
14	Helen Koppell	Great Britain	302.04	14	did not advance	
14	Ursula Mockel	West Germany	302.04	14	did not advance	
16	Milena Tomackova	Czechoslovakia	296.52	16	did not advance	
17	Carmen Casteiner	Italy	285.75	17	did not advance	
18	Silvana Braga	Brazil	284.97	18	did not advance	
19	Melanija Decusara	Romania	282.90	19	did not advance	
20	Norma Baraldi	Mexico	256.71	20	did not advance	
21	Alicija Rivera	Mexico	225.24	21	did not advance	
