= United States at the 1973 World Aquatics Championships =

- Flag of the United States
- World Aquatics code: USA
- National federation: United States Aquatic Sports
- Website: usaquaticsports.org

in Belgrade, Yugoslavia
- Medals Ranked 1st: Gold 15 Silver 16 Bronze 7 Total 38

World Aquatics Championships appearances
- 1973; 1975; 1978; 1982; 1986; 1991; 1994; 1998; 2001; 2003; 2005; 2007; 2009; 2011; 2013; 2015; 2017; 2019; 2022; 2023; 2024; 2025

The United States competed at the 1973 World Aquatics Championships in Belgrade, Yugoslavia from August 31 to September 9.

== Medalists ==
Medal	Name	Sport	Event	Date
Gold	Jim Montgomery	Swimming	Men's 200 m freestyle	September 4
Gold	John Hencken	Swimming	Men's 100 m breaststroke	September 4
Gold	Keena Rothhammer	Swimming	Women's 200 m freestyle	September 5
Gold	Phil Boggs	Diving	Men's springboard	September 6
Gold	Rick DeMont	Swimming	Men's 400 m freestyle	September 6
Gold	American team Melvin Nash; Joe Bottom; Jim Montgomery; John Murphy	Swimming	Men's 4 × 100 m freestyle relay	September 7
Gold	American team Kurt Krumpholz; Robin Backhaus; Richard Klatt; Jim Montgomery	Swimming	Men's 4 × 200 m freestyle relay	September 7
Gold	Heather Greenwood	Swimming	Women's 400 m freestyle	September 7
Gold	Melissa Belote	Swimming	Women's 200 m backstroke	September 7
Gold	Robin Backhaus	Swimming	Men's 200 m butterfly	September 8
Gold	Jim Montgomery	Swimming	Men's 100 m freestyle	September 9
Gold	American team Mike Stamm; John Hencken; Joe Bottom; Jim Montgomery	Swimming	Men's 4 × 100 m medley relay	September 9
Silver	Kurt Krumpholz	Swimming	Men's 200 m freestyle	September 4
Silver	Mike Stamm	Swimming	Men's 100 m backstroke	September 4
Silver	American team Melissa Belote; Marcia Morey; Deena Deardurff; Shirley Babashoff	Swimming	Women's 4 × 100 m medley relay	September 9
Silver	Rod Strachan	Swimming	Men's 400 m individual medley	September 5
Silver	Shirley Babashoff	Swimming	Women's 200 m freestyle	September 5
Silver	Melissa Belote	Swimming	Women's 100 m backstroke	September 5
Silver	John Hencken	Swimming	Men's 200 m breaststroke	September 6
Silver	Stan Carper	Swimming	Men's 200 m individual medley	September 7
Silver	Keena Rothhammer	Swimming	Women's 400 m freestyle	September 7
Silver	Rick DeMont	Swimming	Men's 1500 m freestyle	September 8
Silver	Joe Bottom	Swimming	Men's 100 m butterfly	September 8
Silver	Steve Gregg	Swimming	Men's 200 m butterfly	September 8
Silver	Jo Harshbarger	Swimming	Women's 800 m freestyle	September 8
Silver	Keith Russell	Diving	Men's platform	September 9
Silver	Shirley Babashoff	Swimming	Women's 100 m freestyle	September 9
Bronze	Kathy Heddy	Swimming	Women's 200 m individual medley	September 5
Bronze	Rick Colella	Swimming	Men's 400 m individual medley	September 5
Bronze	Keith Russell	Diving	Men's springboard	September 6
Bronze	John Naber	Swimming	Men's 200 m backstroke	September 6
Bronze	Lynn Colella	Swimming	Women's 200 m breaststroke	September 7
Bronze	Robin Backhaus	Swimming	Men's 100 m butterfly	September 8
Bronze	Lynn Colella	Swimming	Women's 200 m butterfly	September 8

== Diving ==
Athlete	Event	Preliminaries		Final	
Athlete	Event	Points	Rank	Points	Rank
Phil Boggs	Men's springboard	602.25	2 Q	618.57	1st place, gold medalist(s)
Keith Russell	Men's springboard	576.75	4 Q	579.48	3rd place, bronze medalist(s)
Keith Russell	Men's platform	519.99	2 Q	523.74	2nd place, silver medalist(s)
Tim Moore	Men's platform	491.88	5 Q	484.02	6
Jennifer Chandler	Women's springboard	401.10	4 Q	375.06	8
Carrie Irish	Women's springboard	411.12	2 Q	385.98	6
Barbara Schaefer	Women's platform	339.66	7 Q	367.08	4
Deborah Wilson	Women's platform	338.16	8 Q	343.05	7

== Swimming ==
Men

Athlete	Event	Heat		Final	
Athlete	Event	Time	Rank	Time	Rank
Jim Montgomery	100 m freestyle	52.66 CR	1 Q	51.70 CR	1st place, gold medalist(s)
Jim Montgomery	200 m freestyle	1:56.737	2 Q	1:53.02 CR	1st place, gold medalist(s)
John Murphy	100 m freestyle	53.16	6 Q	52.73	5
John Murphy	100 m backstroke	59.33 CR	3 Q	59.37	4
Kurt Krumpholz	200 m freestyle	1:54.58 CR	1 Q	1:53.61	2nd place, silver medalist(s)
Rick DeMont	400 m freestyle	4:04.77	3 Q	3:58.18 WR	1st place, gold medalist(s)
Rick DeMont	1500 m backstroke	—N/a		15:35.44	2nd place, silver medalist(s)
Tim Shaw	400 m freestyle	4:06.57	6 Q	4:01.56	4
John Kinsella	1500 m freestyle	—N/a		15:58.70	4
Mike Stamm	100 m backstroke	59.10 CR	2 Q	58.77	2nd place, silver medalist(s)
Paul Hove	200 m backstroke	2:10.22	6 Q	2:08.17	5
John Naber	200 m backstroke	2:10.13	5 Q	2:06.91	3rd place, bronze medalist(s)
John Hencken	100 m breaststroke	1:04.35 WR	1 Q	1:04.02 WR	1st place, gold medalist(s)
John Hencken	200 m breaststroke	2:21.50	2 Q	2:19.95	2nd place, silver medalist(s)
Rick Colella	100 m breaststroke	1:06.72 CR	4 Q	1:06.69	6
Rick Colella	200 m breaststroke	2:26.17	7 Q	2:26.41	6
Rick Colella	400 m individual medley	4:38.50 CR	1 Q	4:34.68	3rd place, bronze medalist(s)
Joe Bottom	100 m butterfly	55.94 CR	1 Q	56.37	2nd place, silver medalist(s)
Robin Backhaus	100 m butterfly	56.94	4 Q	56.42	3rd place, bronze medalist(s)
Robin Backhaus	200 m butterfly	2:04.93 CR	3 Q	2:03.32 CR	1st place, gold medalist(s)
Steve Gregg	200 m butterfly	2:04.59 CR	1 Q	2:03.58	2nd place, silver medalist(s)
Stan Carper	200 m individual medley	2:11.04	5 Q	2:08.43	2nd place, silver medalist(s)
Fred Tyler	200 m individual medley	2:11.31	7 Q	2:10.86	7
Rod Strachan	400 m individual medley	4:40.06	3 Q	4:33.50	2nd place, silver medalist(s)
Bill Miller*; Stan Carper*; Kurt Krumpholz*; Richard Klatt*; Melvin Nash; Joe Bottom; Jim Montgomery; John Murphy	4 × 100 m freestyle relay	3:32.44 CR	1 Q	3:27.18 CR	1st place, gold medalist(s)
Kurt Krumpholz; Robin Backhaus; Richard Klatt; Jim Montgomery	4 × 200 m freestyle relay	7:54.40	8 Q	7:33.22 WR	1st place, gold medalist(s)
Mike Stamm; John Hencken; Joe Bottom; Jim Montgomery	4 × 100 m medley relay	3:54.91 CR	1 Q	3:49.49 CR	1st place, gold medalist(s)

Legend: (*) = Swimmers who participated in the heat only.

Women

Athlete	Event	Heat		Final	
Athlete	Event	Time	Rank	Time	Rank
Shirley Babashoff	100 m freestyle	59.40 CR	1 Q	58.87	2nd place, silver medalist(s)
Shirley Babashoff	200 m freestyle	2:07.75	2 Q	2:05.33	2nd place, silver medalist(s)
Kathy Heddy	100 m freestyle	1:00.00	6 Q	59.90	7
Kathy Heddy	200 m individual medley	2:28.30 CR	5 Q	2:23.84	3rd place, bronze medalist(s)
Keena Rothhammer	200 m freestyle	2:07.53 CR	1 Q	2:04.99 CR	1st place, gold medalist(s)
Keena Rothhammer	400 m freestyle	4:25.12	3 Q	4:21.50	2nd place, silver medalist(s)
Keena Rothhammer	800 m freestyle	—N/a		9:15.72	6
Heather Greenwood	400 m freestyle	4:24.93 CR	1 Q	4:20.28 CR	1st place, gold medalist(s)
Jo Harshbarger	800 m freestyle	—N/a		8:55.56	2nd place, silver medalist(s)
Linda Stimpson	100 m backstroke	1:07.25	6 Q	1:07.69	7
Melissa Belote	100 m backstroke	1:06.23	3 Q	1:06.11	2nd place, silver medalist(s)
Melissa Belote	200 m backstroke	2:20.57 CR	1 Q	2:20.52 CR	1st place, gold medalist(s)
Maryanne Graham	200 m backstroke	2:29.28	13	did not advance	
Lynn Colella	100 m breaststroke	1:16.67	2 Q	1:16.75	5
Lynn Colella	200 m breaststroke	2:42.43	2 Q	2:41.71	3rd place, bronze medalist(s)
Lynn Colella	200 m butterfly	2:20.36	3 Q	2:19.53	3rd place, bronze medalist(s)
Marcia Morey	100 m breaststroke	1:17.32	7 Q	1:17.04	8
Vicki Hays	200 m breaststroke	2:47.13	10	did not advance	
Deena Deardurff	100 m butterfly	1:04.13	3 Q	1:04.27	4
Peggy Tosdal	100 m butterfly	1:04.33	5 Q	1:04.32	5
Nina MacInnis	200 m butterfly	2:23.87 CR	6 Q	2:22.57	6
Julie Woodcock	200 m individual medley	2:28.66	6 Q	2:25.72	5
Jenny Bartz	400 m individual medley	5:10.75	7 Q	5:10.45	7
Terry Potts	400 m individual medley	5:09.03	5 Q	5:09.90	5
Keena Rothhammer*; Deena Deardurff*; Heather Greenwood; Kim Peyton; Kathy Heddy; Shirley Babashoff	4 × 100 m freestyle relay	5:10.75	7 Q	5:10.45	7
Melissa Belote; Marcia Morey; Deena Deardurff; Shirley Babashoff	4 × 100 m medley relay	4:26.88	2 Q	4:25.80	2nd place, silver medalist(s)

Legend: (*) = Swimmers who participated in the heat only.
