= Khryukin =

Khryukin (Russian: Хрюкин, from хрюкать meaning to grunt) is a Russian masculine surname, its feminine counterpart is Khryukina. It may refer to

- Mikhail Khryukin (born 1955), Russian swimmer
- Timofey Khryukin (1910–1953), Soviet aviator
