= Brazil at the 1973 World Aquatics Championships =

- Flag of Brazil
- World Aquatics code: BRA
- National federation: Brazilian Confederation of Water Sports
- Website: cbda.org.br (in Portuguese)

in Belgrade, Yugoslavia
- Medals: Gold 0 Silver 0 Bronze 0 Total 0

World Aquatics Championships appearances (overview)
- 1973; 1975; 1978; 1982; 1986; 1991; 1994; 1998; 2001; 2003; 2005; 2007; 2009; 2011; 2013; 2015; 2017; 2019; 2022; 2023; 2024; 2025

Brazil competed at the 1973 World Aquatics Championships in Belgrade, Yugoslavia from August 31 to September 9.

== Diving ==
Athlete	Event	Preliminaries		Final	
Athlete	Event	Points	Rank	Points	Rank
Júlio César Veloso	Men's springboard	393.99	20	did not advance	
Milton Machado	Men's springboard	did not start			
Milton Machado	Men's platform	448.32	10	did not advance	
Paulo Costa	Men's platform	418.32	14	did not advance	
Silvana Braga	Women's platform	284.97	18	did not advance	

== Swimming ==
Men

Athlete	Event	Heat		Final	
Athlete	Event	Time	Rank	Time	Rank
José Aranha	100 m freestyle	54.15	14	did not advance	
Ruy de Oliveira	100 m freestyle	53.67 CR	8 Q	53.70	8
José Namorado	200 m freestyle	1:57.82	13	did not advance	
José Namorado	400 m freestyle	4:14.37	13	did not advance	
Paul Jouanneau	400 m freestyle	4:18.19	17	did not advance	
Luis Reinaldo Fleck	1500 m freestyle	—		17:11.62	22
Rômulo Arantes	100 m backstroke	1:00.17	7 Q	1:00.37	7
Rômulo Arantes	200 m backstroke	2:12.93	14	did not advance	
César Lourenco	100 m backstroke	1:03.95	28	did not advance	
César Lourenco	200 m backstroke	2:15.97	15	did not advance	
Sérgio Pinto Ribeiro	100 m breaststroke	1:09.80	18	did not advance	
Sérgio Pinto Ribeiro	200 m breaststroke	2:34.07	21	did not advance	
Eduardo Alijo	100 m butterfly	1:00.39	19	did not advance	
Eduardo Alijo	200 m butterfly	2:12.29	19	did not advance	
Sérgio Waismaun	100 m butterfly	1:00.88	21	did not advance	
Sérgio Waismaun	200 m butterfly	did not start		did not advance	
Antônio Azevedo	200 m individual medley	2:17.25	20	did not advance	
Antônio Azevedo	400 m individual medley	4:56.24	23	did not advance	
Ruy de Oliveira; José Namorado; Jim Adams; José Aranha	4 × 100 m freestyle relay	3:35.25	4 Q	3:33.39	5
Brazil team	4 × 200 m freestyle relay	8:12.06	11	did not advance	
Brazil team	4 × 100 m medley relay	4:04.09	9	did not advance	

Women

Athlete	Event	Heat		Final	
Athlete	Event	Time	Rank	Time	Rank
Lucy Burle	100 m freestyle	1:01.35	13	did not advance	
Lucy Burle	200 m freestyle	2:14.98	18	did not advance	
Maria Guimarães	200 m freestyle	2:14.21	15	did not advance	
Maria Guimarães	400 m freestyle	4:34.05	10	did not advance	
Maria Guimarães	800 m freestyle	9:27.92	12	did not advance	
Valeri Borges	100 m backstroke	1:13.10	22	did not advance	
Valeri Borges	200 m backstroke	2:41.70	22	did not advance	
Cristina Teixeira	100 m breaststroke	1:20.48	16	did not advance	
Cristina Teixeira	200 m breaststroke	2:52.07	16	did not advance	
Suzana Mendonça	100 m breaststroke	1:20.81	18	did not advance	
Suzana Mendonça	200 m breaststroke	2:54.31	19	did not advance	
Jaqueline Mross	100 m butterfly	1:09.75	28	did not advance	
Rosemary Ribeiro	100 m butterfly	1:08.40	18	did not advance	
Maria Isabel Guerra	200 m individual medley	2:36.42	21	did not advance	
Maria Isabel Guerra	400 m individual medley	5:34.58	22	did not advance	
Brazil team	4 × 100 m freestyle relay	4:13.91	13	did not advance	
Brazil team	4 × 100 m medley relay	4:43.65	12	did not advance	
