= Czechoslovakia at the 1973 World Aquatics Championships =

- Flag of Czechoslovakia
- World Aquatics code: TCH

in Belgrade, Yugoslavia
- Medals Ranked =11th: Gold 0 Silver 1 Bronze 0 Total 1

World Aquatics Championships appearances
- 1973; 1975; 1978; 1982; 1986; 1991; 1994; 1998; 2001; 2003; 2005; 2007; 2009; 2011; 2013; 2015; 2017; 2019; 2022; 2023; 2024; 2025

Czechoslovakia competed at the 1973 World Aquatics Championships in Belgrade from August 31 to September 9.

== Medalists ==
Medal	Name	Sport	Event	Date
Silver	Milena Duchková	Diving	Women's springboard	September 3

== Diving ==
Athlete	Event	Preliminaries		Final	
Athlete	Event	Points	Rank	Points	Rank
Milena Duchková	Women's springboard	384.03	9	did not advance	
Milena Duchková	Women's platform	352.20	5 Q	387.18	2nd place, silver medalist(s)
Milena Tomacková	Women's springboard	307.80	20	did not advance	
Milena Tomacková	Women's platform	296.52	16	did not advance	

== Swimming ==
Athlete	Event	Heat		Final	
Athlete	Event	Time	Rank	Time	Rank
Mirek Hrouda	Men's 100 m freestyle	54.24	16	did not advance	
Olga Chlupova	Women's 100 m freestyle	1:02.90	22	did not advance	
Olga Chlupova	Women's 100 m breaststroke	1:20.04	15	did not advance	
Olga Chlupova	Women's 200 m breaststroke	2:50.94	15	did not advance	
Olga Chlupova	Women's 200 m individual medley	2:33.09	18	did not advance	
Věra Faitlová	Women's 100 m butterfly	1:07.93	15	did not advance	
Věra Faitlová	Women's 200 m butterfly	2:29.72	16	did not advance	
