= Indonesia at the 2023 World Aquatics Championships =

- Flag of Indonesia
- World Aquatics code: INA
- National federation: Indonesia Swimming Federation
- Website: indonesiaswimming.org

in Fukuoka, Japan
- Competitors: 9 in 3 sports
- Medals: Gold 0 Silver 0 Bronze 0 Total 0

World Aquatics Championships appearances
- 1973; 1975; 1978; 1982; 1986; 1991; 1994; 1998; 2001; 2003; 2005; 2007; 2009; 2011; 2013; 2015; 2017; 2019; 2022; 2023; 2024; 2025

Indonesia competed at the 2023 World Aquatics Championships in Fukuoka, Japan from 14 to 30 July.

== Diving ==
Indonesia entered 4 divers.

Men

Athlete	Event	Preliminaries		Semifinals		Final	
Athlete	Event	Points	Rank	Points	Rank	Points	Rank
Tri Anggoro Priambodo	3 m springboard	258.55	62	Did not advance			
Adityo Restu Putra	1 m springboard	232.80	57	—N/a		Did not advance	
Adityo Restu Putra	3 m springboard	291.40	52	Did not advance			
Tri Anggoro Priambodo; Adityo Restu Putra	3 m synchro springboard	281.01	23	—N/a		Did not advance	
Andriyan; Adityo Restu Putra	10 m synchro platform	300.03	16	—N/a		Did not advance	

Women

Athlete	Event	Preliminaries		Semifinals		Final	
Athlete	Event	Points	Rank	Points	Rank	Points	Rank
Gladies Lariesa Garina Haga	1 m springboard	226.55	22	—N/a		Did not advance	
Gladies Lariesa Garina Haga	3 m springboard	255.20	27	Did not advance			
Gladies Lariesa Garina Haga	10 m platform	237.45	31	Did not advance			

Mixed

Athlete	Event	Final	
Athlete	Event	Points	Rank
Andriyan; Gladies Lariesa Garina Haga; Adityo Restu Putra	Team event	274.00	12

== Open water swimming ==
Indonesia entered 1 open water swimmer.

Men

Athlete	Event	Time	Rank
Aflah Fadlan Prawira	Men's 10 km	2:04:41.7	51

== Swimming ==
Men

Athlete	Event	Heat		Semifinal		Final	
Athlete	Event	Time	Rank	Time	Rank	Time	Rank
Muhammad Dwiky Raharjo	50 m breaststroke	28.89	39	Did not advance			
Muhammad Dwiky Raharjo	100 m breaststroke	1:03.18	44	Did not advance			
I Gede Siman Sudartawa	50 m backstroke	25.87	33=	Did not advance			
Farrel Armandio Tangkas	100 m backstroke	58.06	49	Did not advance			
Joe Aditya Wijaya Kurniawan	50 m butterfly	25.05	58	Did not advance			
Joe Aditya Wijaya Kurniawan	100 m butterfly	55.55	53	Did not advance			
