= Đuro Savinović =

Croatian water polo player (1950–2021)

Personal information
- Nationality: Croatian
- Born: 1 March 1950 Dubrovnik, PR Croatia, FPR Yugoslavia
- Died: 1 February 2021 (aged 70) Dubrovnik, Croatia
- Height: 192 cm (6 ft 4 in)
- Weight: 91 kg (201 lb)

Sport
- Sport: Water polo
Medal record
Representing Yugoslavia
World Championships
Bronze medal – third place	1973 Belgrade	Team competition
European Championships
Silver medal – second place	1977 Jönköping	Team competition
Bronze medal – third place	1974 Vienna	Team competition
Mediterranean Games
Gold medal – first place	1979 Split	Team competition
Silver medal – second place	1975 Algiers	Team competition

Đuro Savinović (1 March 1950 – 1 February 2021) was a Croatian water polo player. He competed in the men's tournament at the 1976 Summer Olympics.

== See also ==
- List of World Aquatics Championships medalists in water polo
