= Indonesia at the 2017 World Aquatics Championships =

- Flag of Indonesia
- World Aquatics code: INA
- National federation: Swimming Federation of Indonesia
- Website: www.jatengfast.com

in Budapest, Hungary
- Competitors: 9 in 1 sport
- Medals: Gold 0 Silver 0 Bronze 0 Total 0

World Aquatics Championships appearances
- 1973; 1975; 1978; 1982; 1986; 1991; 1994; 1998; 2001; 2003; 2005; 2007; 2009; 2011; 2013; 2015; 2017; 2019; 2022; 2023; 2024; 2025

Indonesia is scheduled to compete at the 2017 World Aquatics Championships in Budapest, Hungary from 14 July to 30 July.

== Swimming ==
Indonesian swimmers have achieved qualifying standards in the following events (up to a maximum of 2 swimmers in each event at the A-standard entry time, and 1 at the B-standard):

Men

Athlete	Event	Heat		Semifinal		Final	
Athlete	Event	Time	Rank	Time	Rank	Time	Rank
Indra Gunawan	50 m breaststroke	28.50	44	did not advance			
Aflah Fadlan Prawira	400 m freestyle	3:58.40	40	—N/a		did not advance	
Aflah Fadlan Prawira	1500 m freestyle	15:31.27 NR	32	—N/a		did not advance	
Triady Fauzi Sidiq	50 m freestyle	53.66	=41	did not advance			
Triady Fauzi Sidiq	100 m freestyle	22.99	53	did not advance			
Triady Fauzi Sidiq	100 m butterfly	53.66	=41	did not advance			
Triady Fauzi Sidiq	200 m individual medley	2:05.34	34	did not advance			
I Gede Siman Sudartawa	50 m backstroke	25.17	16 Q	25.04 NR	15	did not advance	
I Gede Siman Sudartawa	100 m backstroke	55.81	=27	did not advance			
Glenn Victor Sutanto	50 m butterfly	24.65	43	did not advance			
Indra Gunawan; Triady Fauzi Sidiq; I Gede Siman Sudartawa; Glenn Victor Sutanto	4 × 100 m medley relay	3:44.57	19	—N/a		did not advance	

Women

Athlete	Event	Heat		Semifinal		Final	
Athlete	Event	Time	Rank	Time	Rank	Time	Rank
Ressa Kania Dewi	200 m freestyle	2:05.25	35	did not advance			
Ressa Kania Dewi	400 m freestyle	4:24.05	29	—N/a		did not advance	
Ressa Kania Dewi	200 m individual medley	2:17.93	29	did not advance			
Anandia Evato	50 m breaststroke	32.62	31	did not advance			
Azzahra Permatahani	400 m individual medley	4:57.00	26	—N/a		did not advance	
Raina Ramdhani	800 m freestyle	9:02.49	30	—N/a		did not advance	
