= Indonesia at the 2022 World Aquatics Championships =

- Flag of Indonesia
- World Aquatics code: INA
- National federation: Indonesia Swimming Federation
- Website: indonesiaswimming.org

in Budapest, Hungary
- Competitors: 6 in 2 sports
- Medals: Gold 0 Silver 0 Bronze 0 Total 0

World Aquatics Championships appearances
- 1973; 1975; 1978; 1982; 1986; 1991; 1994; 1998; 2001; 2003; 2005; 2007; 2009; 2011; 2013; 2015; 2017; 2019; 2022; 2023; 2024; 2025

Indonesia competed at the 2022 World Aquatics Championships in Budapest, Hungary from 18 June to 3 July.

== Diving ==
Women

Athlete	Event	Preliminaries		Semifinals		Final	
Athlete	Event	Points	Rank	Points	Rank	Points	Rank
Gladies Haga	1 m springboard	214.00	29	—N/a		did not advance	
Gladies Haga	3 m springboard	165.45	38	—N/a		did not advance	

== Swimming ==
Men

Athlete	Event	Heat		Semifinal		Final	
Athlete	Event	Time	Rank	Time	Rank	Time	Rank
I Gede Siman Sudartawa	50 metre backstroke	26.09	29	did not advance			
Farrel Tangkas	100 metre backstroke	57.17	36	did not advance			
Farrel Tangkas	200 metre backstroke	2:04.84	27	did not advance			
Glenn Victor Sutanto	50 metre butterfly	24.60	46	did not advance			
Glenn Victor Sutanto	100 metre butterfly	55.94	51	did not advance			
Aflah Fadlan Prawira	200 metre individual medley	2:07.23	35	did not advance			
Aflah Fadlan Prawira	400 metre individual medley	4:31.15	28	—N/a		did not advance	

Women

Athlete	Event	Heat		Semifinal		Final	
Athlete	Event	Time	Rank	Time	Rank	Time	Rank
Masniari Wolf	50 metre backstroke	30.48	27	did not advance			
Masniari Wolf	100 metre backstroke	1:06:70	37	did not advance			
