= Indonesia at the 2024 World Aquatics Championships =

- Flag of Indonesia
- FINA code: INA
- National federation: Indonesia Swimming Federation

in Doha, Qatar
- Competitors: 14 in 4 sports
- Medals: Gold 0 Silver 0 Bronze 0 Total 0

World Aquatics Championships appearances
- 1973; 1975; 1978; 1982; 1986; 1991; 1994; 1998; 2001; 2003; 2005; 2007; 2009; 2011; 2013; 2015; 2017; 2019; 2022; 2023; 2024

Indonesia competed at the 2024 World Aquatics Championships in Doha, Qatar from 2 to 18 February.

== Competitors ==
The following is the list of competitors in the Championships.

Sport	Men	Women	Total
Artistic swimming	0	2	2
Diving	3	1	4
Open water swimming	2	1	3
Swimming	4	1	5
Total	9	5	14

== Artistic swimming ==
Women

Athlete	Event	Preliminaries		Final	
Athlete	Event	Points	Rank	Points	Rank
Hilda Tri Julyandra	Solo technical routine	152.0934	27	Did not advance	
Hilda Tri Julyandra	Solo free routine	122.1063	26	Did not advance	
Hilda Tri Julyandra; Gabrielle Permata Sari	Duet technical routine	158.4967	39	Did not advance	
Hilda Tri Julyandra; Gabrielle Permata Sari	Duet free routine	87.5688	37	Did not advance	

== Diving ==
Men

Athlete	Event	Preliminaries		Semifinals		Final	
Athlete	Event	Points	Rank	Points	Rank	Points	Rank
Tri Anggoro Priambodo	3 m springboard	207.30	65	Did not advance			
Adityo Restu Putra	1 m springboard	185.15	42	—		Did not advance	
Adityo Restu Putra	3 m springboard	279.95	51	Did not advance			
Tri Anggoro Priambodo; Adityo Restu Putra	3 m synchro springboard	—				288.18	22
Andriyan; Adityo Restu Putra	10 m synchro platform	—				306.96	18

Women

Athlete	Event	Preliminaries		Semifinals		Final	
Athlete	Event	Points	Rank	Points	Rank	Points	Rank
Gladies Lariesa Garina	1 m springboard	135.65	45	—		Did not advance	
Gladies Lariesa Garina	3 m springboard	225.15	31	Did not advance			

Mixed

Athlete	Event	Final	
Athlete	Event	Points	Rank
Andriyan; Gladies Lariesa Garina	3 m synchro springboard	207.00	14
Andriyan; Adityo Restu Putra; Gladies Lariesa Garina	Team event	330.60	6

== Open water swimming ==
Men

Athlete	Event	Time	Rank
Aflah Fadlan Prawira	Men's 5 km	55:17.3	45
Aflah Fadlan Prawira	Men's 10 km	1:54:33.9	55
Ernest Fabian Wijaya	Men's 5 km	57:35.5	59

Women

Athlete	Event	Time	Rank
Kathriana Mella Gustianjani	Women's 5 km	1:09:00.4	55

== Swimming ==
Indonesia entered 5 swimmers.

Men

Athlete	Event	Heat		Semifinal		Final	
Athlete	Event	Time	Rank	Time	Rank	Time	Rank
Joe Kurniawan	100 metre freestyle	51.15	43	Did not advance			
Joe Kurniawan	100 metre butterfly	53.97	35	Did not advance			
Muhammad Raharjo	50 metre breaststroke	28.75	37	Did not advance			
Muhammad Raharjo	100 metre breaststroke	1:03.46	46	Did not advance			
I Gede Siman Sudartawa	50 metre backstroke	26.06	25	Did not advance			
Farrel Tangkas	100 metre backstroke	57.21	37	Did not advance			
Farrel Tangkas	200 metre backstroke	2:05.49	27	Did not advance			

Women

Athlete	Event	Heat		Semifinal		Final	
Athlete	Event	Time	Rank	Time	Rank	Time	Rank
Masniari Wolf	50 metre backstroke	29.80	35	Did not advance			
Masniari Wolf	100 metre backstroke	1:05.39	42	Did not advance			
