= Indonesia at the 2019 World Aquatics Championships =

- Flag of Indonesia
- FINA code: INA
- National federation: Indonesian Swimming Federation
- Website: indoswim.org (in Indonesian)

in Gwangju, South Korea
- Medals: Gold 0 Silver 0 Bronze 0 Total 0

World Aquatics Championships appearances
- 1973; 1975; 1978; 1982; 1986; 1991; 1994; 1998; 2001; 2003; 2005; 2007; 2009; 2011; 2013; 2015; 2017; 2019; 2022; 2023; 2024

Indonesia competed at the 2019 World Aquatics Championships in Gwangju, South Korea from 12 to 28 July.

== Open water swimming ==
Indonesia qualified one male open water swimmer.

Athlete	Event	Time	Rank
Aflah Prawira	Men's 10 km	1:52:33.8	47

== Swimming ==
Indonesia entered eight swimmers.

Men

Athlete	Event	Heat		Semifinal		Final	
Athlete	Event	Time	Rank	Time	Rank	Time	Rank
Aflah Prawira	200 m freestyle	1:51.91	47	Did not advance			
Aflah Prawira	400 m freestyle	3:59.98	38	—		Did not advance	
Aflah Prawira	800 m freestyle	8:06.58	25	—		Did not advance	
Aflah Prawira	1500 m freestyle	8:06.58	25	—		Did not advance	
Aflah Prawira	400 m individual medley	4:26.49	26	—		Did not advance	
Triady Fauzi Sidiq	50 m freestyle	23.36	59	Did not advance			
Triady Fauzi Sidiq	100 m freestyle	51.80	70	Did not advance			
Triady Fauzi Sidiq	200 m individual medley	2:12.09	49	Did not advance			
I Gede Siman Sudartawa	50 m backstroke	26.00	41	Did not advance			
Gagarin Nathaniel	50 m breaststroke	28.97	48	Did not advance			
Glenn Victor Sutanto	50 m butterfly	24.84	49	Did not advance			
Glenn Victor Sutanto	100 m butterfly	54.57	44	Did not advance			

Women

Athlete	Event	Heat		Semifinal		Final	
Athlete	Event	Time	Rank	Time	Rank	Time	Rank
Anandia Evato	100 m breaststroke	1:12.96	39	Did not advance			
Adinda Kirana	200 m butterfly	2:20.07	29	Did not advance			
Azzahra Permatahani	400 m individual medley	1:12.96	39	—		Did not advance	
