= Jennifer McHugh =

Canadian swimmer

Personal information
- Born: 27 November 1957 (age 68) Vancouver, British Columbia, Canada

Sport
- Sport: Swimming

Jennifer McHugh (born 27 November 1957) is a Canadian former swimmer. She competed in two events at the 1972 Summer Olympics.
