= Sorana Prelipceanu =

Romanian diver

Personal information
- Nationality: Romanian
- Born: 28 May 1958 (age 66); Cluj-Napoca, Romania

Sport
- Sport: Diving

Sorana Prelipceanu (born 28 May 1958) is a Romanian diver. She competed in the women's 3 metre springboard event at the 1972 Summer Olympics.
