= Indonesia at the 2013 World Aquatics Championships =

- Flag of Indonesia
- FINA code: INA
- National federation: Persatuan Renang Seluruh Indonesia

in Barcelona, Spain
- Competitors: 15 in 4 sports
- Medals: Gold 0 Silver 0 Bronze 0 Total 0

World Aquatics Championships appearances
- 1973; 1975; 1978; 1982; 1986; 1991; 1994; 1998; 2001; 2003; 2005; 2007; 2009; 2011; 2013; 2015; 2017; 2019; 2022; 2023; 2024

Indonesia is competing at the 2013 World Aquatics Championships in Barcelona, Spain between 19 July and 4 August 2013.

== Diving ==
Indonesia qualified seven quota places for the following diving events.

Men

Athlete	Event	Preliminaries		Semifinals		Final	
Athlete	Event	Points	Rank	Points	Rank	Points	Rank
Akhmad Sukran Jamjami	3 m springboard	225.35	45	did not advance			
Andryan Andryan; Akhmad Sukran Jamjami	3 m synchronized springboard	313.26	17	—		did not advance	
Andryan Andryan; Adityo Restu Putra	10 m synchronized platform	307.44	17	—		did not advance	

Women

Athlete	Event	Preliminaries		Semifinals		Final	
Athlete	Event	Points	Rank	Points	Rank	Points	Rank
Sari Ambarwati Suprihatin	3 m springboard	153.15	43	did not advance			
Yasmin Linadini	10 m platform	148.85	36	did not advance			
Eka Purnama Indah; Sari Ambarwati Suprihatin	3 m synchronized springboard	208.47	20	—		did not advance	
Yasmin Linadini; Dew Setyaningsih	10 m synchronized platform	203.67	13	—		did not advance	

== Open water swimming ==
Indonesia qualified two quota places for the following events in open water swimming.

Athlete	Event	Time	Rank
Abdul Hady	Men's 5 km	1:00:40.7	50
Abdul Hady	Men's 10 km	2:10:46.2	62
Risa Andriani Permana	Women's 5 km	1:10:16.7	41
Risa Andriani Permana	Women's 10 km	OTL	

== Swimming ==
Indonesian swimmers achieved qualifying standards in the following events (up to a maximum of 2 swimmers in each event at the A-standard entry time, and 1 at the B-standard):

Men

Athlete	Event	Heat		Semifinal		Final	
Athlete	Event	Time	Rank	Time	Rank	Time	Rank
Triady Fauzi Sidiq	50 m freestyle	23.14	44	did not advance			
Triady Fauzi Sidiq	100 m freestyle	52.11	52	did not advance			
I Gede Siman Sudartawa	50 m backstroke	25.68	19	did not advance			
I Gede Siman Sudartawa	100 m backstroke	55.55	24	did not advance			
I Gede Siman Sudartawa	200 m backstroke	2:04.90	28	did not advance			

Women

Athlete	Event	Heat		Semifinal		Final	
Athlete	Event	Time	Rank	Time	Rank	Time	Rank
Monalisa Lorenza	100 m butterfly	1:03.93	39	did not advance			
Monalisa Lorenza	200 m butterfly	2:18.24	22	did not advance			
Raina Ramdhani	400 m freestyle	4:29.61	32	—		did not advance	
Raina Ramdhani	800 m freestyle	9:10.75	33	—		did not advance	

== Synchronized swimming ==
Indonesia has qualified a pair synchronized swimmers.

Athlete	Event	Preliminaries		Final	
Athlete	Event	Points	Rank	Points	Rank
Samara Pattiasina	Solo free routine	65.010	32	did not advance	
Claudia Megawati Suyanto	Solo technical routine	61.200	34	did not advance	
