= Indonesia at the 2015 World Aquatics Championships =

- Flag of Indonesia
- FINA code: INA
- National federation: Persatuan Renang Seluruh Indonesia

in Kazan, Russia
- Competitors: 21 in 4 sports
- Medals: Gold 0 Silver 0 Bronze 0 Total 0

World Aquatics Championships appearances
- 1973; 1975; 1978; 1982; 1986; 1991; 1994; 1998; 2001; 2003; 2005; 2007; 2009; 2011; 2013; 2015; 2017; 2019; 2022; 2023; 2024

Indonesia competed at the 2015 World Aquatics Championships in Kazan, Russia from 24 July to 9 August 2015.

== Diving ==
Indonesian divers qualified for the individual spots and synchronized teams at the World Championships.

Men

Athlete	Event	Preliminaries		Semifinals		Final	
Athlete	Event	Points	Rank	Points	Rank	Points	Rank
Tri Anggoro Priambodo	1 m springboard	249.55	36	—		Did not advance	
Tri Anggoro Priambodo	3 m springboard	219.90	61	Did not advance			
Adityo Putra	1 m springboard	288.05	31	—		Did not advance	
Adityo Putra	3 m springboard	316.70	50	Did not advance			
Andriyan; Adityo Putra	10 m synchronized platform	311.97	20	—		Did not advance	

== Open water swimming ==
Indonesia has qualified four swimmers to compete in the open water marathon.

Athlete	Event	Time	Rank
Ricky Anggawijaya	Men's 5 km	Did not start	
Aflah Prawira	Men's 10 km	Did not start	
Raina Ramadhani	Women's 5 km	Did not start	
Ressa Dewi	Women's 10 km	Did not start	

== Swimming ==
Indonesian swimmers have achieved qualifying standards in the following events (up to a maximum of 2 swimmers in each event at the A-standard entry time, and 1 at the B-standard):

Men

Athlete	Event	Heat		Semifinal		Final	
Athlete	Event	Time	Rank	Time	Rank	Time	Rank
Triady Fauzi Sidiq	200 m individual medley	DNS		Did not advance			
I Gede Siman Sudartawa	50 m backstroke	25.77	30	Did not advance			
I Gede Siman Sudartawa	100 m backstroke	56.39	=41	Did not advance			
Glenn Victor Sutanto	50 m butterfly	24.51	38	Did not advance			
Glenn Victor Sutanto	100 m butterfly	54.18	41	Did not advance			

Women

Athlete	Event	Heat		Semifinal		Final	
Athlete	Event	Time	Rank	Time	Rank	Time	Rank
Monalisa Lorenza	100 m butterfly	1:03.85	=49	Did not advance			
Monalisa Lorenza	200 m butterfly	2:15.76	31	Did not advance			
Anak Agung Ratih	50 m backstroke	30.33	39	Did not advance			
Anak Agung Ratih	100 m backstroke	1:06.34	53	Did not advance			
Yessy Yosaputra	200 m backstroke	2:20.47	39	Did not advance			

== Synchronized swimming ==
Indonesia fielded a full team of eight synchronized swimmers to compete in each of the following events.

Women

Athlete	Event	Preliminaries		Final	
Athlete	Event	Points	Rank	Points	Rank
Andriani Ardhana; Sabihisma Arsyi; Amara Cinthia Gebby; Sherly Haryono; Livia Lukito; Adela Nirmala; Rosa Palmastuti; Samara Pattiasina	Team technical routine	62.7381	24	Did not advance	
