= 1973 World Aquatics Championships =

Aquatic sports competition

1st FINA World Championships
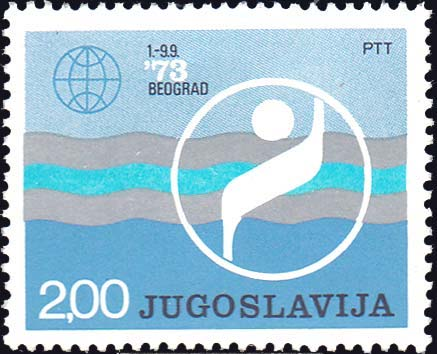
- Host city: Belgrade, Yugoslavia
- Date: 31 August–9 September 1973
- Venue: Tašmajdan Sports and Recreation Center
- Nations: 47
- Athletes: 686
- Opened by: Josip Broz Tito

The 1st FINA World Championships in Aquatics were held in the Tašmajdan SRC in Belgrade, SR Serbia, SFR Yugoslavia, from 31 August to 9 September 1973.

== Medal table ==
* Host nation (Yugoslavia)

Rank	Nation	Gold	Silver	Bronze	Total
1	United States (USA)	15	16	7	38
2	East Germany (GDR)	13	6	9	28
3	Italy (ITA)	2	1	2	5
4	Hungary (HUN)	2	1	1	4
4	Sweden (SWE)	2	1	1	4
6	Canada (CAN)	1	3	2	6
7	Australia (AUS)	1	2	2	5
8	Great Britain (GBR)	1	0	1	2
9	Soviet Union (URS)	0	4	1	5
10	Netherlands (NED)	0	1	1	2
11	Czechoslovakia (TCH)	0	1	0	1
11	France (FRA)	0	1	0	1
13	Japan (JPN)	0	0	6	6
14	West Germany (FRG)	0	0	3	3
15	Yugoslavia (YUG)*	0	0	1	1
Totals (15 entries)		37	37	37	111

== Results ==
=== Diving ===
Men

Event	Gold	Silver	Bronze
3 m springboard	Phil Boggs (USA)	Klaus Dibiasi (ITA)	Keith Russell (USA)
10 m platform	Klaus Dibiasi (ITA)	Keith Russell (USA)	Falk Hoffmann (GDR)

Women

Event	Gold	Silver	Bronze
3 m springboard	Christa Köhler (GDR)	Ulrika Knape (SWE)	Marina Janicke (GDR)
10 m platform	Ulrika Knape (SWE)	Milena Duchková (CZE)	Irina Kalynina (URS)

=== Swimming ===
Men

Event	Gold	Silver	Bronze
100 m freestyle	Jim Montgomery (USA)	Michel Rousseau (FRA)	Michael Wenden (AUS)
200 m freestyle	Jim Montgomery (USA)	Kurt Krumpholz (USA)	Roger Pyttel (GDR)
400 m freestyle	Rick DeMont (USA)	Brad Cooper (AUS)	Bengt Gingsjö (SWE)
1500 m freestyle	Stephen Holland (AUS)	Rick DeMont (USA)	Brad Cooper (AUS)
100 m backstroke	Roland Matthes (GDR)	Mike Stamm (USA)	Lutz Wanja (GDR)
200 m backstroke	Roland Matthes (GDR)	Zoltán Verrasztó (HUN)	John Naber (USA)
100 m breaststroke	John Hencken (USA)	Mikhail Khryukin (URS)	Nobutaka Taguchi (JPN)
200 m breaststroke	David Wilkie (GBR)	John Hencken (USA)	Nobutaka Taguchi (JPN)
100 m butterfly	Bruce Robertson (CAN)	Joe Bottom (USA)	Robin Backhaus (USA)
200 m butterfly	Robin Backhaus (USA)	Steve Gregg (USA)	Hartmut Flöckner (GDR)
200 m individual medley	Gunnar Larsson (SWE)	Stan Carper (USA)	David Wilkie (GBR)
400 m individual medley	András Hargitay (HUN)	Rod Strachan (USA)	Rick Colella (USA)
4 × 100 m freestyle relay	United States (USA); Mel Nash; Joe Bottom; Jim Montgomery; John Murphy	Soviet Union (URS); Igor Grivennikov; Viktor Aboymov; Vladimir Krivtsov; Vladimir Bure	East Germany (GDR); Roland Matthes; Roger Pyttel; Peter Bruch; Hartmut Flöckner
4 × 200 m freestyle relay	United States (USA); Kurt Krumpholz; Robin Backhaus; Rick Klatt; Jim Montgomery	Australia (AUS); John Kulasalu; Steve Badger; Brad Cooper; Michael Wenden	West Germany (FRG); Klaus Steinbach; Werner Lampe; Peter Nocke; Folkert Meeuw
4 × 100 m medley relay	United States (USA); Mike Stamm; John Hencken; Joe Bottom; Jim Montgomery	East Germany (GDR); Roland Matthes; Jürgen Glas; Hartmut Flöckner; Roger Pyttel	Canada (CAN); Ian MacKenzie; Peter Hrdlitschka; Bruce Robertson; Brian Phillips

Women

Event	Gold	Silver	Bronze
100 m freestyle	Kornelia Ender (GDR)	Shirley Babashoff (USA)	Enith Brigitha (NED)
200 m freestyle	Keena Rothhammer (USA)	Shirley Babashoff (USA)	Andrea Eife (GDR)
400 m freestyle	Heather Greenwood (USA)	Keena Rothhammer (USA)	Novella Calligaris (ITA)
800 m freestyle	Novella Calligaris (ITA)	Jo Harshbarger (USA)	Gudrun Wegner (GDR)
100 m backstroke	Ulrike Richter (GDR)	Melissa Belote (USA)	Wendy Cook (CAN)
200 m backstroke	Melissa Belote (USA)	Enith Brigitha (NED)	Andrea Gyarmati (HUN)
100 m breaststroke	Renate Vogel (GDR)	Lyubov Rusanova (URS)	Brigitte Schuchardt (GDR)
200 m breaststroke	Renate Vogel (GDR)	Hannelore Anke (GDR)	Lynn Colella (USA)
100 m butterfly	Kornelia Ender (GDR)	Rosemarie Kother (GDR)	Mayumi Aoki (JPN)
200 m butterfly	Rosemarie Kother (GDR)	Roswitha Beier (GDR)	Lynn Colella (USA)
200 m individual medley	Andrea Hübner (GDR)	Kornelia Ender (GDR)	Kathy Heddy (USA)
400 m individual medley	Gudrun Wegner (GDR)	Angela Franke (GDR)	Novella Calligaris (ITA)
4 × 100 m freestyle relay	East Germany (GDR); Kornelia Ender; Andrea Eife; Andrea Hübner; Sylvia Eichner	United States (USA); Kim Peyton; Kathy Heddy; Heather Greenwood; Shirley Babashoff	West Germany (FRG); Jutta Weber; Heidemarie Reineck; Gudrun Beckmann; Angela Steinbach
4 × 100 m medley relay	East Germany (GDR); Ulrike Richter; Renate Vogel; Rosemarie Kother; Kornelia Ender	United States (USA); Melissa Belote; Marcia Morey; Deena Deardurff; Shirley Babashoff	West Germany (FRG); Angelika Grieser; Petra Nows; Gudrun Beckmann; Jutta Weber

=== Synchronised swimming ===
Women

Event	Gold	Silver	Bronze
Solo routine	Teresa Andersen (USA)	Jojo Carrier (CAN)	Junko Hasumi (JPN)
Duet routine	Teresa Andersen (USA); Gail Johnson (USA)	Jojo Carrier (CAN); Madeleine Ramsay (CAN)	Masako Fujiwara (JPN); Yasuko Fujiwara (JPN)
Team routine	United States (USA); Teresa Andersen; Susan Baross; Robin Curren; Jackie Douglas; Gail Johnson; Dana Moore; Amanda Norrish; Suzanne Randell	Canada (CAN); Michelle Calkins; Frances Hambrook; Debbie Humphrey; Lorraine Nicholl; Gail Page; Carol Stuart; Susan Thomas; Laura Wilkin	Japan (JPN); Masako Fujiwara; Yasuko Fujiwara; Junko Hasumi; Yasuko Unesaki — — — —

=== Water polo ===
Men

Event	Gold	Silver	Bronze
Team	Hungary Balazs Balla; András Bodnár; Gábor Csapó; Tibor Cservenyák; Tamás Faragó; István Görgényi; Zoltán Kásás; Ferenc Konrád; Endre Molnár; László Sárosi; István Szívós Jr.	Soviet Union Anatoly Akimov; Aleksei Barkalov; Aleksandr Dreval; Andrey Frolov; Aleksandr Kabanov; Yuri Mityanin; Nuzgari Mshvenieradze; Leonid Osipov; Vitaly Romanchuk; Sergey Shevernyov; Vladimir Zhmudsky	Yugoslavia Siniša Belamarić; Ozren Bonačić; Milan Franković; Boško Lozica; Predrag Manojlović; Miloš Marković; Đorđe Perišić; Damir Polić; Ratko Rudić; Đuro Savinović; Nikola Stamenić

== Participating nations ==
47 nations entered the competition.

- Argentina
- Australia
- Austria
- Belgium
- Brazil
- Bulgaria
- Canada
- Colombia
- Cuba
- Denmark
- Czechoslovakia
- East Germany
- Ecuador
- Egypt
- Finland
- France
- Great Britain
- Greece
- Hungary
- Indonesia
- Iran
- Israel
- Italy
- Jamaica
- Japan
- Luxembourg
- Mexico
- Netherlands
- New Zealand
- Norway
- Panama
- Papua New Guinea
- Peru
- Poland
- Puerto Rico
- Romania
- Soviet Union
- Spain
- Sweden
- Switzerland
- Tunisia
- Turkey
- United States
- Venezuela
- West Germany
- Yugoslavia
