= Christa Köhler =

East German diver

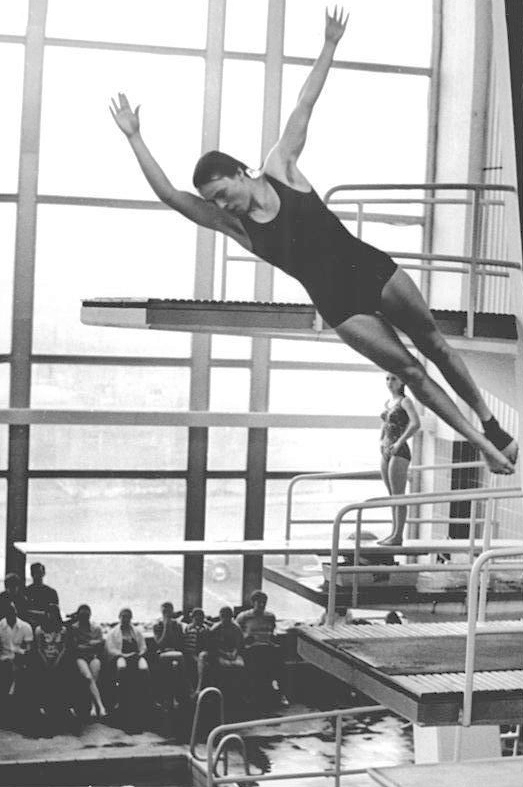
- Köhler in 1972

Personal information
- Born: 18 August 1951 (age 74) Vilz, East Germany
- Height: 162 cm (5 ft 4 in)
- Weight: 56 kg (123 lb)

Sport
- Sport: Diving
- Club: SC Empor Rostock
Medal record
Representing East Germany
Olympic Games
Silver medal – second place	1976 Montreal	3 m springboard
World Championships
Gold medal – first place	1973 Belgrade	Springboard
European Championships
Gold medal – first place	1977 Jönköping	Springboard

Christa Köhler (later Kinast; born 18 August 1951) is a retired East German diver who specialized in the 3 m springboard event. She won a silver medal at the 1976 Montreal Olympics, placing 11th in 1972, and a gold medal at the 1977 European Championships.
