= Kornelia Ender =

East German swimmer (born 1958)

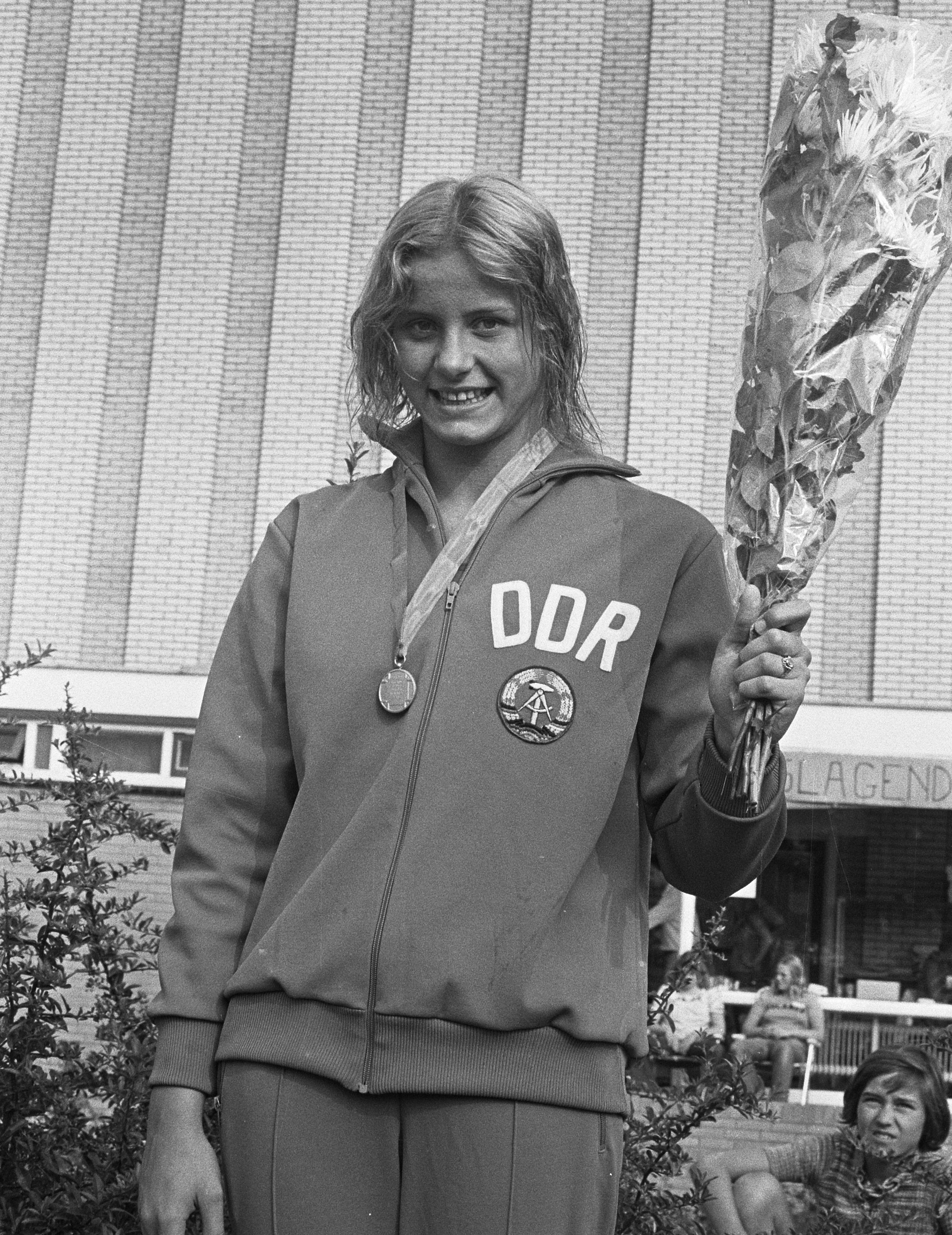
- Ender during the European Cup in August 1973

Personal information
- Nationality: German
- Born: 25 October 1958 (age 68) Plauen, East Germany (now Saxony, Germany)
- Height: 1.72 m (5 ft 8 in)
- Weight: 59 kg (130 lb)

Sport
- Sport: Swimming
- Strokes: Freestyle, butterfly, medley
- Club: SV Halle
Medal record
Women's swimming
Representing East Germany
Event	1st	2nd	3rd
Olympic Games	4	4	0
World Championships (LC)	8	2	0
European Championships (LC)	4	0	0
Total	16	6	0
Olympic Games
Gold medal – first place	1976 Montreal	100 m freestyle
Gold medal – first place	1976 Montreal	200 m freestyle
Gold medal – first place	1976 Montreal	100 m butterfly
Gold medal – first place	1976 Montreal	4×100 m medley
Silver medal – second place	1972 Munich	200 m individual medley
Silver medal – second place	1972 Munich	4×100 m freestyle
Silver medal – second place	1972 Munich	4×100 m medley
Silver medal – second place	1976 Montreal	4×100 m freestyle
World Championships (LC)
Gold medal – first place	1973 Belgrade	100 m freestyle
Gold medal – first place	1973 Belgrade	100 m butterfly
Gold medal – first place	1973 Belgrade	4×100 m freestyle
Gold medal – first place	1973 Belgrade	4×100 m medley
Gold medal – first place	1975 Cali	100 m freestyle
Gold medal – first place	1975 Cali	100 m butterfly
Gold medal – first place	1975 Cali	4x100 m freestyle
Gold medal – first place	1975 Cali	4x100 m medley
Silver medal – second place	1973 Belgrade	200 m medley
Silver medal – second place	1975 Cali	200 m freestyle
European Championships (LC)
Gold medal – first place	1974 Vienna	100 m freestyle
Gold medal – first place	1974 Vienna	200 m freestyle
Gold medal – first place	1974 Vienna	4×100 m freestyle
Gold medal – first place	1974 Vienna	4×100 m medley

Kornelia Ender (later Matthes now Grummt, born 25 October 1958) is a former East German swimmer who at the 1976 Summer Olympics became the first female swimmer to win four gold medals at a single Olympic Games, all in world record times. It was later proven that the East German team doctors had systematically administered steroids to their athletes (albeit without the athletes' knowledge). As she had exhibited symptoms of steroid use in 1976 (deep voice, overdeveloped body), strong suspicion was cast on the validity of Ender's accomplishments.

Ender trained from a young age and won her first Olympic medals as a 13-year-old at the 1972 Olympics in Munich: three silver medals, including one in the 200 m individual medley, finishing behind Australia's Shane Gould. Over the following years she broke 32 world records in individual events, including the four at the Montreal Games. In 1991, she addressed the long-held suspicions about her physical condition at the 1976 Games, acknowledging that team doctors and coaches had given her numerous injections of drugs over the preceding months (cf. doping in East Germany). Ender said that she did not know at the time, nor had she ever subsequently found out, exactly what the drugs were. She said she was told only that the drugs would help her "regenerate and recuperate" and therefore, although she was surprised by the muscle mass she added, she nonetheless attributed it simply to her rigorous training.

When she became suspicious and refused to take chlorodehydromethyltestosterone in 1977 she was banned from the team by Manfred Ewald.

Ender was married for four years to East German backstroke swimmer and multiple Olympic champion Roland Matthes. She is now married to former East German track and field athlete and bobsledder Steffen Grummt.

== See also ==
- List of members of the International Swimming Hall of Fame
- List of multiple Olympic gold medalists
- List of multiple Summer Olympic medalists

Records
Preceded by Mayumi Aoki; Rosemarie Kother	Women's 100 metre butterfly world record holder (long course); 14 April 1973 – 21 August 1974; 9 June 1975 – 28 August 1977	Succeeded by Rosemarie Kother; Christiane Knacke
Preceded by Shane Gould; Ulrike Tauber	Women's 200 metre individual medley world record holder (long course); 13 April 1973 – 4 September 1973; 5 June 1976 – 10 July 1977	Succeeded by Andrea Hubner; Ulrike Tauber
Awards
Preceded by Karin Janz	East German Sportswoman of the Year; 1973–1976	Succeeded by Rosemarie Ackermann
