= Sylvia Fiedler =

German diver (born 1951)

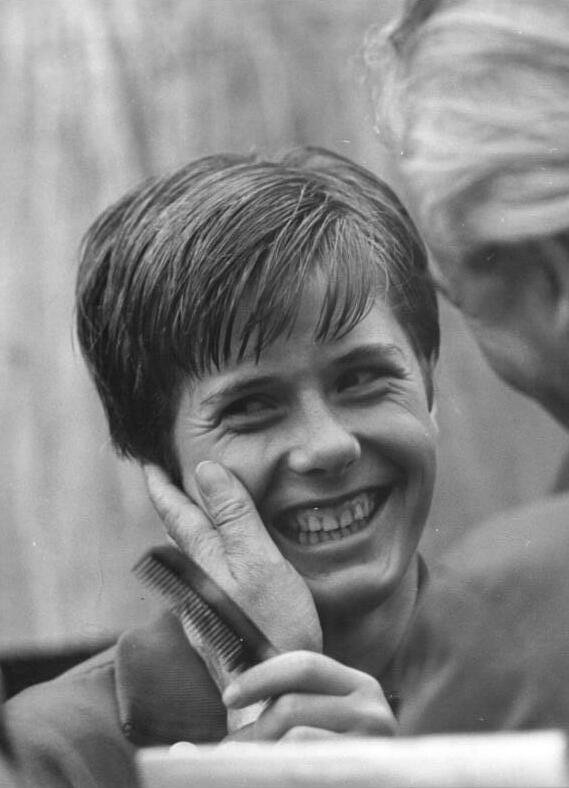
- Sylvia Fiedler in 1970

Personal information
- Nationality: German
- Born: 1 October 1951 (age 74) Dresden, East Germany

Sport
- Sport: Diving
Medal record
Women's diving
Representing East Germany
European Championships
| Bronze medal – third place | 1970 Barcelona | 10 m platform |

Sylvia Fiedler (born 1 October 1951) is a German diver. She competed at the 1968 Summer Olympics and the 1972 Summer Olympics.
