= Michael Wenden =

Australian swimmer

Michael Wenden AM MBE
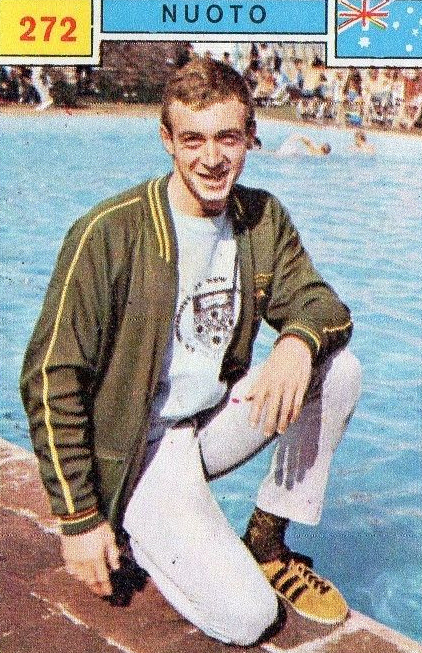

Personal information
- Full name: Michael Vincent Wenden
- Nicknames: "Mick", "Mike"
- National team: Australia
- Born: 17 November 1949 (age 76) Sydney, New South Wales
- Height: 1.84 m (6 ft 0 in)
- Weight: 76 kg (168 lb)

Sport
- Sport: Swimming
- Strokes: Freestyle
Medal record
Men's swimming
Representing Australia
Olympic Games
Gold medal – first place	1968 Mexico City	100 m freestyle
Gold medal – first place	1968 Mexico City	200 m freestyle
Silver medal – second place	1968 Mexico City	4×200 m freestyle
Bronze medal – third place	1968 Mexico City	4×100 m freestyle
World Championships (LC)
Silver medal – second place	1973 Belgrade	4×200 m freestyle
Bronze medal – third place	1973 Belgrade	100 m freestyle
Commonwealth Games
Gold medal – first place	1966 Kingston	110 yd freestyle
Gold medal – first place	1966 Kingston	4×110 yd freestyle
Gold medal – first place	1966 Kingston	4×220 yd freestyle
Gold medal – first place	1970 Edinburgh	100 m freestyle
Gold medal – first place	1970 Edinburgh	200 m freestyle
Gold medal – first place	1970 Edinburgh	4×100 m freestyle
Gold medal – first place	1970 Edinburgh	4×200 m freestyle
Gold medal – first place	1974 Christchurch	100 m freestyle
Gold medal – first place	1974 Christchurch	4×200 m freestyle
Silver medal – second place	1970 Edinburgh	4×100 m medley
Silver medal – second place	1974 Christchurch	4×100 m freestyle
Silver medal – second place	1974 Christchurch	4×100 m medley
Bronze medal – third place	1974 Christchurch	200 m freestyle

Michael Vincent Wenden, AM, MBE (born 17 November 1949) is a champion swimmer who represented Australia in the 1968 Summer Olympics and 1972 Summer Olympics. In 1968 he won four medals: gold in both the 100- and 200-metre freestyle (setting world records in each) and a silver and a bronze in freestyle relays.

Wenden was inducted into the International Swimming Hall of Fame in 1979. He was one of the eight bearers of the Olympic Flag at the opening ceremony of the 2000 Summer Olympics in Sydney.

Wenden was appointed an MBE in 1969 and made a Member of the Order of Australia (AM) in the 2006 Australia Day Honours for "service to the Olympic movement as an administrator and competitor".

Wenden holds a Bachelor of Commerce from the University of New South Wales.

== See also ==
- List of members of the International Swimming Hall of Fame
- List of Commonwealth Games medallists in swimming (men)
- List of Olympic medalists in swimming (men)
- World record progression 100 metres freestyle
- World record progression 4 × 200 metres freestyle relay

Records
Preceded by Ken Walsh	Men's 100 metre freestyle world record holder (long course); 19 October 1968 – 23 August 1970	Succeeded by Mark Spitz
