= Mel Zajac =

Canadian swimmer

Personal information
- Full name: Melvin Nicholas Zajac
- Born: 23 April 1956 Vancouver, British Columbia, Canada
- Died: 13 July 1986 (aged 30) Chilliwack, British Columbia, Canada

Sport
- Sport: Swimming

Melvin Nicholas "Mel" Zajac (23 April 1956 – 13 July 1986) was a Canadian swimmer. He competed in the men's 100 metre breaststroke at the 1976 Summer Olympics.

Zajac died in a kayak accident when his kayak got caught in a tide pool and overturned. His brother Marty died in an avalanche eight months later in Cariboo.
