= Richard Klatt =

American swimmer, water polo player, and coach (born 1951)

Personal information
- Full name: Richard A. Klatt
- Nickname: "Rick"
- National team: United States
- Born: 1951 (age 74–75)
- Occupations: Coach, swimming, water polo
- Relatives: Daniel Klatt, son

Sport
- Sport: Swimming, Water Polo
- Strokes: Freestyle
- College team: University of New Mexico
Medal record
Men's swimming
Representing the United States
World Championships
Gold medal – first place	1973 Belgrade	4×200 m freestyle

Richard A. Klatt (born 1951) is a retired American swimmer who won a gold medal as a member of the first-place U.S. team in the men's 4×200-meter freestyle relay at the 1973 World Aquatics Championships in Belgrade, Yugoslavia, setting a new world record in the relay event (7:33.22). After his years as a swimming and water polo competitor ended, he served as a water polo and swimming coach.

Klatt attended Escondido High School, where in his Freshman year, he was named the Most Valuable Player on the Escondido Varsity swim team.

== University of New Mexico ==
Attending from 1970-1974, Klatt swam and played water polo for the University of New Mexico, receiving All American honors in 1972. He began his water polo career while at the University, having formerly competed in basketball and swimming. He twice led New Mexico's water polo team to qualify for the NCAA championships, and was a team captain. Swimming in freestyle competition, Klatt held a conference title in the 200 and 100 meter freestyle, and with his speed and consistency, anchored freestyle relays. He was a champion in Western Athletic Conference competition in ten instances, he missed portions of his collegiate Sophomore year due to injuries.

At the 1972 Olympic trials, Klatt placed 16th in the 200 freestyle.

== Coaching ==
After retiring from swimming, he worked for more than 30 years as a swimming and water polo coach initially coaching swimming and water polo at his alma mater the University of New Mexico in the 1970's. Klatt served as an age-group swimming coach for the Clovis Swim Club in 1983, and more recently served as the head coach at the Fresno Dolphins Swim Team. His son Daniel Klatt was a former 2004 U.S. Olympic water polo player and an assistant water polo coach for the national women's team. Daniel Klatt had a career of over twenty years coaching the women's water polo team at the University of California Irvine beginning in 2004, and later coached UC Irvine's men's teams.

== See also ==
- World record progression 4 × 200 metres freestyle relay
