= Jorge Jaramillo =

Colombian swimmer (born 1956)

Personal information
- Born: August 17, 1956 (age 69)

Sport
- Sport: Swimming
- Strokes: Butterfly, individual medley
- College team: Southern Illinois University
- Coach: Javier Gomez (Colombian Swimming Team Coach) Bob Steele (S.I.U. Swimming Coach)
Medal record
Representing Colombia
Central American and Caribbean Games
Gold medal – first place	1974 Santo Domingo	100m and 200m butterfly, 200 and 400 Individual medley, 400m freestyle
Gold medal – first place	1974 Santo Domingo	100m and 200m butterfly, 400 Individual medley, 400m Freestyle

Jorge Jaramillo (born 17 August 1956) is a Colombian former swimmer who competed in the 1972 Summer Olympics and in the 1976 Summer Olympics. He is also the brother of tennis coach Gabe Jaramillo.
