= Věra Faitlová =

Czech swimmer

Personal information
- Born: 6 November 1957 (age 68) Prague, Czechoslovakia

Sport
- Sport: Swimming

Věra Faitlová (born 6 November 1957) is a Czech former swimmer. She competed in two events at the 1972 Summer Olympics.
