= David Brumwell =

Canadian swimmer

Personal information
- Born: 20 November 1953 (age 72) Calgary, Alberta, Canada

Sport
- Sport: Swimming

David Brumwell (born 20 November 1953) is a Canadian former swimmer. He competed in two events at the 1972 Summer Olympics placing 23rd and 21st in the 200 meter and 400 meter individual races.
