= Neil Martin (swimmer) =

Australian swimmer

Personal information
- Born: 27 May 1955 (age 71) Brisbane, Australia

Sport
- Sport: Swimming
- Strokes: backstroke, medley

Neil Martin (born 27 May 1955) is an Australian former swimmer. He competed in four events at the 1972 Summer Olympics. He would later earn an MBA from Harvard Business School.
