= Antônio Azevedo =

Brazilian swimmer

Personal information
- Full name: Antônio Carlos Rocha Azevedo
- Born: May 30, 1958 (age 68) Rio de Janeiro, Brazil
- Height: 1.85 m (6 ft 1 in)
- Weight: 80 kg (180 lb)

Sport
- Sport: Swimming
- Strokes: Medley
Medal record
Men's swimming
Representing Brazil

Antônio Carlos Rocha Azevedo (born May 30, 1958), sometimes known as Rochinha, is a former international medley swimmer from Brazil, who competed at one Summer Olympics for his native country. At the 1972 Summer Olympics, in Munich, he swam the 200-metre and 400-metre individual medley, not reaching the finals.
