= Nataliya Popova =

Russian swimmer

Personal information
- Nationality: Russian
- Born: 18 April 1958 (age 68) Yaroslavl, Soviet Union

Sport
- Sport: Swimming

Nataliya Popova (born 18 April 1958) is a Russian former swimmer. She competed in three events at the 1976 Summer Olympics for the Soviet Union.
