= Peter Hrdlitschka =

Canadian swimmer (born 1955)

Personal information
- Born: November 6, 1955 (age 70) Reutlingen, Germany

Sport
- Sport: Swimming
Medal record
Representing Canada
World Championships
| Bronze medal – third place | 1973 Belgrade | 4x100m medley relay |

Peter Hermann Hrdlitschka (born November 6, 1955) is a former Canadian competition swimmer. At 2 years of age, Hrdlitschka immigrated, with his parents Doris and Frank, to Ocean Falls, British Columbia, Canada where, at age 5, his competitive swimming career began with a 3rd-place finish for freestyle. The Hrdlitschka family moved to Vernon, British Columbia in 1965.

In 1970, Hrdlitschka set the Canadian record for boys 13-14 100-metre breaststroke. In 1972, he finished 4th at the Canadian Olympic trials and moved to Vancouver to train with the Canadian Dolphin Swim Club and the National Development Team Program. In 1973, he won bronze for Canada — along with teammates Ian MacKenzie, Bruce Robertson and Brian Phillips — at the World Aquatics Championships in Belgrade, Yugoslavia, in the men's 4 x 100 metre medley relay.

As a senior swimmer with the Master Ducks Swim Club, Hrdlitschka continues to set National records for his age group in the breaststroke.

Hrdlitschka has 3 daughters — Danielle, Cara and Kyla — and a step-daughter, Megan. On March 31, 2012, Hrdlitschka married Sharon Wyse Boileau. The couple live in North Vancouver where Hrdlitschka was President of Ledcor Construction, Canada, until his December 31, 2020 retirement; Hrdlitschka continues to act as a senior advisor for Ledcor Construction. Hrdlitschka and Wyse Boileau — now officially Wyse Hrdlitschka — are involved in volunteer and philanthropical efforts on behalf of children.
