= Jürgen Glas =

German swimmer

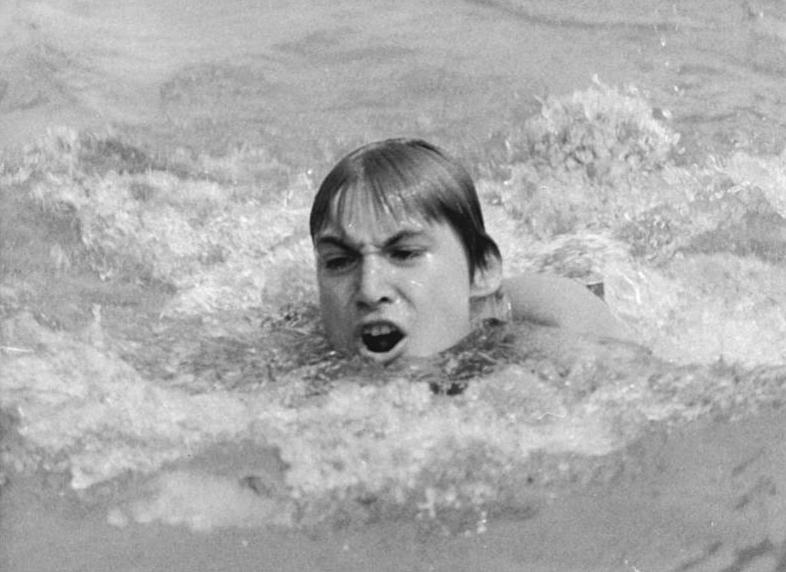
- Jürgen Glas in 1973

Personal information
- Born: 1956 (age 69–70)

Sport
- Sport: Swimming
- Club: SC Dynamo Berlin
Medal record
Representing East Germany
World Championships
Silver medal – second place	1973 Belgrade	4×100 m medley

Jürgen Glas (born 1956) is a retired German breaststroke swimmer who won a silver medal in the 4 × 100 m medley relay at the 1973 World Aquatics Championships. In 1973 and 1975 he won four national titles in total and twice finished in second place.

As of 2000 he was still competing in swimming in the masters category.
