= Eduardo Orejuela =

Ecuadorian swimmer

Personal information
- Born: 11 March 1952 (age 74) Guayaquil, Ecuador
- Height: 173 cm (5 ft 8 in)
- Weight: 71 kg (157 lb)

Sport
- Sport: Swimming

Eduardo Orejuela (born 11 March 1952) is an Ecuadorian former swimmer. He competed in two events at the 1968 Summer Olympics.
