= John Kulasalu =

Australian swimmer (born 1956)

Personal information
- Born: 1956 (age 69–70)

Sport
- Sport: Swimming
Medal record
Men's swimming
Representing Australia
World Championships
Silver medal – second place	1973 Belgrade	4×200 m freestyle
Commonwealth Games
Gold medal – first place	1974 Christchurch	400 m freestyle
Gold medal – first place	1974 Christchurch	4×200 m freestyle

John Kulasalu (born 1956) is an Australian retired swimmer who won a silver medal in the 4 × 200 m freestyle relay at the 1973 World Aquatics Championships.
