= Michaela Herweck =

German diver

Personal information
- Nationality: German
- Born: 1 September 1947 (age 77); Dresden, Germany

Sport
- Sport: Diving

Michaela Herweck (born 1 September 1947) is a German diver. She competed in the women's 3 metre springboard event at the 1972 Summer Olympics.
