= Mikhail Khryukin =

Russian swimmer

Personal information
- Born: 1955 (age 70–71) Voronezh, Russian SFSR, Soviet Union

Sport
- Sport: Swimming
- Club: SKA Voronoezh
Medal record
Representing Soviet Union
World Championships
| Silver medal – second place | 1973 Belgrade | 100 m breaststroke |

Mikhail Khryukin (Russian: Михаил Хрюкин; born 1955) is a Russian swimmer who won a silver medal in the 100 m breaststroke at the 1973 World Aquatics Championships. In 1973, he also set two European records in the same event. Between 1973 and 1975 he won four national titles in breaststroke and medley relay disciplines. He later competed in the masters category, winning three national titles in 2009 and setting three national records in 2006.
