= Helmut Podolan =

Austrian swimmer

Personal information
- Born: 31 August 1955 (age 70)

Sport
- Sport: Swimming

Helmut Podolan (born 31 August 1955) is an Austrian former swimmer. He competed at the men's 100 metre backstroke and men's 200 metre backstroke events at the 1972 Summer Olympics.
