= Norma Baraldi =

Mexican diver

Personal information
- Full name: Norma Baraldi Briseño
- Nationality: Mexican
- Born: 20 July 1954 (age 70)

Sport
- Sport: Diving

Norma Baraldi Briseño (born 20 July 1954) is a Mexican diver. She competed in two events at the 1976 Summer Olympics.
