= Swimming at the 1973 World Aquatics Championships =

These are the results (medal winners) of the swimming competition at the 1973 World Aquatics Championships.

== Medal table ==
| Rank | Nation | Gold | Silver | Bronze | Total |
|---|---|---|---|---|---|
| 1 | East Germany (GDR) | 12 | 6 | 7 | 25 |
| 2 | United States (USA) | 11 | 15 | 6 | 32 |
| 3 | Australia (AUS) | 1 | 2 | 2 | 5 |
| 4 | Hungary (HUN) | 1 | 1 | 1 | 3 |
| 5 | Canada (CAN) | 1 | 0 | 2 | 3 |
| 5 | Italy (ITA) | 1 | 0 | 2 | 3 |
| 7 | Great Britain (GBR) | 1 | 0 | 1 | 2 |
| 7 | Sweden (SWE) | 1 | 0 | 1 | 2 |
| 9 | Soviet Union (URS) | 0 | 3 | 0 | 3 |
| 10 | Netherlands (NED) | 0 | 1 | 1 | 2 |
| 11 | France (FRA) | 0 | 1 | 0 | 1 |
| 12 | Japan (JPN) | 0 | 0 | 3 | 3 |
| 12 | West Germany (FRG) | 0 | 0 | 3 | 3 |
| Totals (13 entries) | | 29 | 29 | 29 | 87 |

== Medal summary ==
=== Men ===
| Event | Gold | | Silver | | Bronze | |
|---|---|---|---|---|---|---|
| 100 m freestyle | Jim Montgomery (USA) | 51.70 | Michel Rousseau (FRA) | 52.08 | Michael Wenden (AUS) | 52.22 |
| 200 m freestyle | Jim Montgomery (USA) | 1:53.02 | Kurt Krumpholz (USA) | 1:53.61 | Roger Pyttel (GDR) | 1:53.97 |
| 400 m freestyle | Rick DeMont (USA) | 3:58.18; WR | Brad Cooper (AUS) | 3:58.70 | Bengt Gingsjö (SWE) | 4:01.27 |
| 1500 m freestyle | Stephen Holland (AUS) | 15:31.85; WR | Rick DeMont (USA) | 15:35.44 | Brad Cooper (AUS) | 15:45.04 |
| 100 m backstroke | Roland Matthes (GDR) | 57.47 | Mike Stamm (USA) | 58.77 | Lutz Wanja (GDR) | 59.08 |
| 200 m backstroke | Roland Matthes (GDR) | 2:01.87; WR | Zoltán Verrasztó (HUN) | 2:05.89 | John Naber (USA) | 2:06.91 |
| 100 m breaststroke | John Hencken (USA) | 1:04.02; WR | Mikhail Khryukin (URS) | 1:04.61 | Nobutaka Taguchi (JPN) | 1:05.61 |
| 200 m breaststroke | David Wilkie (GBR) | 2:19.28; WR | John Hencken (USA) | 2:19.95 | Nobutaka Taguchi (JPN) | 2:23.11 |
| 100 m butterfly | Bruce Robertson (CAN) | 55.69 | Joe Bottom (USA) | 56.37 | Robin Backhaus (USA) | 56.42 |
| 200 m butterfly | Robin Backhaus (USA) | 2:03.32 | Steve Gregg (USA) | 2:03.58 | Hartmut Flöckner (GDR) | 2:03.84 |
| 200 m individual medley | Gunnar Larsson (SWE) | 2:08.36 | Stan Carper (USA) | 2:08.43 | David Wilkie (GBR) | 2:08.84 |
| 400 m individual medley | András Hargitay (HUN) | 4:31.11 | Rod Strachan (USA) | 4:33.50 | Rick Colella (USA) | 4:34.68 |
| 4 × 100 m freestyle relay | United States (USA); Mel Nash; Joe Bottom; Jim Montgomery; John Murphy | 3:27.18 | Soviet Union (URS); Igor Grivennikov; Viktor Aboymov; Vladimir Krivtsov; Vladimir Bure | 3:31.36 | East Germany (GDR); Roland Matthes; Roger Pyttel; Peter Bruch; Hartmut Flöckner | 3:32.03 |
| 4 × 200 m freestyle relay | United States (USA); Kurt Krumpholz; Robin Backhaus; Rick Klatt; Jim Montgomery | 7:33.22; WR | Australia (AUS); John Kulasalu; Steve Badger; Brad Cooper; Michael Wenden | 7:43.65 | Germany (GER); Klaus Steinbach; Werner Lampe; Peter Nocke; Folkert Meeuw | 7:43.68 |
| 4 × 100 m medley relay | United States (USA); Mike Stamm; John Hencken; Joe Bottom; Jim Montgomery | 3:49.49 | East Germany (GDR); Roland Matthes; Jürgen Glas; Hartmut Flöckner; Roger Pyttel | 3:53.24 | Canada (CAN); Ian MacKenzie; Peter Hrdlitschka; Bruce Robertson; Brian Phillips | 3:56.37 |

Legend: WR – World record; CR – Championship record

=== Women ===
| Event | Gold | | Silver | | Bronze | |
|---|---|---|---|---|---|---|
| 100 m freestyle | Kornelia Ender (GDR) | 57.54; WR | Shirley Babashoff (USA) | 58.87 | Enith Brigitha (NED) | 58.87 |
| 200 m freestyle | Keena Rothhammer (USA) | 2:04.99 | Shirley Babashoff (USA) | 2:05.33 | Andrea Eife (GDR) | 2:05.52 |
| 400 m freestyle | Heather Greenwood (USA) | 4:20.28 | Keena Rothhammer (USA) | 4:21.50 | Novella Calligaris (ITA) | 4:21.79 |
| 800 m freestyle | Novella Calligaris (ITA) | 8:52.97; WR | Jo Harshbarger (USA) | 8:55.56 | Gudrun Wegner (GDR) | 9:01.82 |
| 100 m backstroke | Ulrike Richter (GDR) | 1:05.42 | Melissa Belote (USA) | 1:06.11 | Wendy Cook (CAN) | 1:06.27 |
| 200 m backstroke | Melissa Belote (USA) | 2:20.52 | Enith Brigitha (NED) | 2:22.15 | Andrea Gyarmati (HUN) | 2:22.48 |
| 100 m breaststroke | Renate Vogel (GDR) | 1:13.74 | Lyubov Rusanova (URS) | 1:15.42 | Brigitte Schuchardt (GDR) | 1:15.82 |
| 200 m breaststroke | Renate Vogel (GDR) | 2.40.01 | Hannelore Anke (GDR) | 2:40.49 | Lynn Colella (USA) | 2:41.71 |
| 100 m butterfly | Kornelia Ender (GDR) | 1:02.53 | Rosemarie Kother (GDR) | 1:02.68 | Mayumi Aoki (JPN) | 1:03.73 |
| 200 m butterfly | Rosemarie Kother (GDR) | 2:13.76; WR | Roswitha Beier (GDR) | 2:16.77 | Lynn Colella (USA) | 2:19.53 |
| 200 m individual medley | Andrea Hübner (GDR) | 2:20.51; WR | Kornelia Ender (GDR) | 2:21.21 | Kathy Heddy (USA) | 2:23.84 |
| 400 m individual medley | Gudrun Wegner (GDR) | 4:57.51; WR | Angela Franke (GDR) | 5:00.37 | Novella Calligaris (ITA) | 5:02.02 |
| 4 × 100 m freestyle relay | East Germany (GDR); Kornelia Ender; Andrea Eife; Andrea Hübner; Sylvia Eichner | 3:52.45; WR | United States (USA); Kim Peyton; Kathy Heddy; Heather Greenwood; Shirley Babashoff | 3:55.52 | Germany (GER); Jutta Weber; Heidemarie Reineck; Gudrun Beckmann; Angela Steinbach | 3:58.88 |
| 4 × 100 m medley relay | East Germany (GDR); Ulrike Richter; Renate Vogel; Rosemarie Kother; Kornelia Ender | 4:16.84; WR | United States (USA); Melissa Belote; Marcia Morey; Deena Deardurff; Shirley Babashoff | 4:25.80 | Germany (GER); Angelika Grieser; Petra Nows; Gudrun Beckmann; Jutta Weber | 4:26.57 |

Legend: WR – World record; CR – Championship record
