= Ramón Volcán =

Venezuelan swimmer (born 1956)

Personal information
- Born: June 7, 1956 (age 70)

Sport
- Sport: Swimming
Medal record
Representing Venezuela
Central American and Caribbean Games
Gold medal – first place	1974 Santo Domingo	100m butterfly
Gold medal – first place	1978 Medellin	4x100m freestyle relay

Ramón Volcán (born 7 June 1956) is a Venezuelan former swimmer who competed in the 1976 Summer Olympics.
