= Mexico at the 1973 World Aquatics Championships =

- Flag of Mexico
- FINA code: MEX
- National federation: Mexican Swimming Federation
- Website: fmn.org.mx (in Spanish)

in Belgrade, Yugoslavia
- Medals: Gold 0 Silver 0 Bronze 0 Total 0

World Aquatics Championships appearances
- 1973; 1975; 1978; 1982; 1986; 1991; 1994; 1998; 2001; 2003; 2005; 2007; 2009; 2011; 2013; 2015; 2017; 2019; 2022; 2023; 2024

Mexico competed at the 1973 World Aquatics Championships in Belgrade, Yugoslavia from August 31 to September 9.

== Diving ==
Athlete	Event	Preliminaries		Final	
Athlete	Event	Points	Rank	Points	Rank
Porfirio Becerril	Men's springboard	399.78	18	did not advance	
Carlos Girón	Men's springboard	496.89	10	did not advance	
Carlos Girón	Men's platform	454.47	10	did not advance	
José Robinson	Men's platform	445.86	11	did not advance	
Norma Baraldi	Women's springboard	284.91	22	did not advance	
Norma Baraldi	Women's platform	256.71	20	did not advance	
Alicija Rivera	Women's springboard	269.88	23	did not advance	
Alicija Rivera	Women's platform	225.24	21	did not advance	
