= Ian MacKenzie (swimmer) =

Canadian swimmer

Personal information
- Full name: Ian MacKenzie
- National team: Canada
- Born: September 30, 1953 (age 72) Vancouver, British Columbia
- Height: 1.78 m (5 ft 10 in)
- Weight: 71 kg (157 lb)

Sport
- Sport: Swimming
- Strokes: Backstroke, freestyle
Medal record
Men's swimming
Representing Canada
World Championships
Bronze medal – third place	1973 Belgrade	4×100 m medley
Pan American Games
Silver medal – second place	1971 Cali	4×100 m freestyle
British Commonwealth Games
Gold medal – first place	1974 Christchurch	4×100 m freestyle
Bronze medal – third place	1974 Christchurch	4×200 m freestyle

Ian MacKenzie (born September 30, 1953) is a former competition swimmer who represented Canada at the 1972 Summer Olympics in Munich, Germany. MacKenzie was a member of Canada's team in the 4x200-metre freestyle relay which placed 7th in the event final. He also competed in the 100 and 200-metre backstroke events, advancing the semifinals of the 100-metre.

== See also ==
- List of Commonwealth Games medallists in swimming (men)
