= West Germany at the 1973 World Aquatics Championships =

- Flag of West Germany
- World Aquatics code: FRG

in Belgrade, Yugoslavia
- Medals Ranked 14th: Gold 0 Silver 0 Bronze 3 Total 3

World Aquatics Championships appearances
- 1973; 1975; 1978; 1982; 1986

West Germany competed at the 1973 World Aquatics Championships in Belgrade, Yugoslavia from August 31 to September 9.

== Diving ==
Men

Athlete	Event	Preliminaries		Final	
Athlete	Event	Points	Rank	Points	Rank
Norbert Huda	Men's springboard	499.41	9	did not advance	
Michaela Herweck	Women's springboard	329.88	18	did not advance	
Ursula Mockel	Women's springboard	331.92	17	did not advance	
Ursula Mockel	Women's platform	302.04	=14	did not advance	
