= Italy at the 1973 World Aquatics Championships =

- Flag of Italy
- World Aquatics code: ITA
- National federation: Italian Swimming Federation

in Belgrade, Yugoslavia
- Medals Ranked 3rd: Gold 2 Silver 1 Bronze 2 Total 5

World Aquatics Championships appearances (overview)
- 1973; 1975; 1978; 1982; 1986; 1991; 1994; 1998; 2001; 2003; 2005; 2007; 2009; 2011; 2013; 2015; 2017; 2019; 2022; 2023; 2024; 2025

Italy competed at the 1973 World Aquatics Championships in Belgrade, Yugoslavia from August 31 to September 9.

== Medalists ==
Medal	Name	Sport	Event	Date
Gold	Klaus Dibiasi	Diving	Men's platform	9 September
Silver	Klaus Dibiasi	Diving	Men's springboard	6 September

== Diving ==
Athlete	Event	Preliminaries		Final	
Athlete	Event	Points	Rank	Points	Rank
Klaus Dibiasi	Men's springboard	605.40	1 Q	617.73	2nd place, silver medalist(s)
Klaus Dibiasi	Men's platform	526.77	1 Q	559.53	1st place, gold medalist(s)
Giorgio Cagnotto	Men's springboard	563.22	5 Q	574.05	4
Giorgio Cagnotto	Men's platform	507.93	4 Q	492.06	4
Giovanna Marchi	Women's springboard	340.71	16	did not advance	
Carmen Casteiner	Women's platform	285.75	17	did not advance	
