= East Germany at the 1973 World Aquatics Championships =

- Flag of East Germany
- World Aquatics code: GDR

in Belgrade, Yugoslavia
- Medals Ranked 2nd: Gold 13 Silver 6 Bronze 9 Total 28

World Aquatics Championships appearances
- 1973; 1975; 1978; 1982; 1986

East Germany competed at the 1973 World Aquatics Championships in Belgrade, Yugoslavia from August 31 to September 9.

== Medalists ==
Medal	Name	Sport	Event	Date
Gold	Christa Köhler	Diving	Women's springboard	3 September
Bronze	Marina Janicke	Diving	Women's springboard	3 September
Bronze	Falk Hoffmann	Diving	Men's platform	9 September

== Diving ==
Men

Athlete	Event	Preliminaries		Final	
Athlete	Event	Points	Rank	Points	Rank
Falk Hoffmann	Men's springboard	546.69	7 Q	549.90	7
Falk Hoffmann	Men's platform	460.83	7 Q	492.15	3rd place, bronze medalist(s)
Wolfram Ristam	Men's springboard	487.68	11	did not advance	
Wolfram Ristam	Men's platform	381.09	20	did not advance	

Women

Athlete	Event	Preliminaries		Final	
Athlete	Event	Points	Rank	Points	Rank
Christa Köhler	Women's springboard	405.51	3 Q	442.17	1st place, gold medalist(s)
Marina Janicke	Women's springboard	394.02	5 Q	426.33	3rd place, bronze medalist(s)
Marina Janicke	Women's platform	393.57	1 Q	365.73	5
Sylvia Fiedler	Women's platform	365.91	4 Q	355.59	6
