= Soviet Union at the 1973 World Aquatics Championships =

- Flag of the Soviet Union
- World Aquatics code: URS

in Belgrade, Yugoslavia
- Medals Ranked 9th: Gold 0 Silver 4 Bronze 1 Total 5

World Aquatics Championships appearances
- 1973; 1975; 1978; 1982; 1986; 1991

Luxembourg competed at the 1973 World Aquatics Championships in Belgrade, Yugoslavia from August 31 to September 9.

== Medalists ==
Medal	Name	Sport	Event	Date
Bronze	Irina Kalinina	Diving	Women's platform	7 September

== Diving ==
Athlete	Event	Preliminaries		Final	
Athlete	Event	Points	Rank	Points	Rank
Vyacheslav Strakhov	Men's springboard	590.82	3 Q	553.01	5
Vladimir Vasin	Men's springboard	554.97	6 Q	551.91	6
David Hambartsumyan	Men's platform	485.91	6 Q	479.97	7
Nikolay Mikhailin	Men's platform	515.05	3 Q	484.05	5
Tamara Safonova	Women's springboard	380.88	10	did not advance	
Yelena Yemelyanova	Women's springboard	345.87	15	did not advance	
Yelena Yemelyanova	Women's platform	337.56	9	did not advance	
Irina Kalinina	Women's platform	370.50	3 Q	381.42	3rd place, bronze medalist(s)
