= Sweden at the 1973 World Aquatics Championships =

- Flag of Sweden
- FINA code: SWE
- National federation: Swedish Swimming Federation
- Website: svensksimidrott.se (in Swedish)

in Belgrade, Yugoslavia
- Medals Ranked =4th: Gold 2 Silver 1 Bronze 1 Total 4

World Aquatics Championships appearances (overview)
- 1973; 1975; 1978; 1982; 1986; 1991; 1994; 1998; 2001; 2003; 2005; 2007; 2009; 2011; 2013; 2015; 2017; 2019; 2022; 2023; 2024

Sweden competed at the 1973 World Aquatics Championships in Belgrade, Yugoslavia from August 31 to September 9.

== Medalists ==
Medal	Name	Sport	Event	Date
Gold	Ulrika Knape	Diving	Women's platform	7 September
Silver	Ulrika Knape	Diving	Women's springboard	3 September

== Diving ==
Athlete	Event	Preliminaries		Final	
Athlete	Event	Points	Rank	Points	Rank
Agneta Henrikson	Women's springboard	389.31	7 Q	407.47	4
Ulrika Knape	Women's springboard	420.24	1 Q	434.19	2nd place, silver medalist(s)
Ulrika Knape	Women's platform	390.42	2 Q	406.77	1st place, gold medalist(s)
