= Swimming at the 1976 Summer Olympics – Men's 200 metre freestyle =

Men's 200 metre freestyle at the Games of the XXII Olympiad
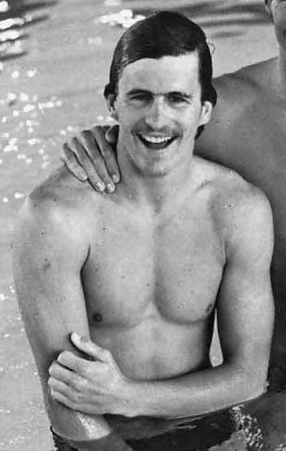
- Gold medalist Bruce Furniss
- Venue: Olympic Pool, Montreal
- Date: 19 July 1980 (heats & final)
- Competitors: 55 from 33 nations
- Winning time: 1:50.29 WR

Medalists
1st place, gold medalist(s)		Bruce Furniss	United States
2nd place, silver medalist(s)		John Naber	United States
3rd place, bronze medalist(s)		Jim Montgomery	United States

The men's 200 metre freestyle event at the 1976 Summer Olympics took place on July 19 at the Olympic Pool, Montreal. There were 55 competitors from 33 nations, with each nation having up to three swimmers. The medals were swept the United States, the only time there has been a medal sweep in the men's 200 metre freestyle (in 1984, nations were limited to two swimmers, making sweeps impossible). Bruce Furniss took gold, John Naber silver, and Jim Montgomery bronze. It was the second consecutive and third overall victory by an American swimmer.

== Background ==
This was the fifth appearance of the 200 metre freestyle event. It was first contested in 1900. It would be contested a second time, though at 220 yards, in 1904. After that, the event did not return until 1968; since then, it has been on the programme at every Summer Games.

Two of the 8 finalists from the 1972 Games returned: bronze medalist Werner Lampe and sixth-place finisher Klaus Steinbach, both of West Germany. Reigning Olympic champion Mark Spitz had retired at the age of 22 after winning 7 gold medals in 1972. The American team was still strong, however. Jim Montgomery had won the inaugural 1973 World Aquatics Championships. Tim Shaw, the 1975 World Champion who had broken Spitz's world record, did not swim in this event after finishing 5th in the U.S. trials (he competed in longer races in 1976). The 1975 runner-up, Bruce Furniss, however, had broken Shaw's record three times and was a favourite in this event. Montgomery and Furniss were joined by backstroke specialist John Naber.

The Bahamas, Bulgaria, Greece, Indonesia, Ireland, Monaco, Nicaragua, Panama, Portugal, Spain, Tunisia, and the Virgin Islands each made their debut in the event. Australia and the United States made their fifth appearance each, the only two nations to have competed in all prior editions of the event.

== Competition format ==
The competition used a two-round (heats, final) format. The advancement rule followed the format introduced in 1952. A swimmer's place in the heat was not used to determine advancement; instead, the fastest times from across all heats in a round were used. There were 8 heats of up to 8 swimmers each. The top 8 swimmers advanced to the final. Swim-offs were used as necessary to break ties.

This swimming event used freestyle swimming, which means that the method of the stroke is not regulated (unlike backstroke, breaststroke, and butterfly events). Nearly all swimmers use the front crawl or a variant of that stroke. Because an Olympic-size swimming pool is 50 metres long, this race consisted of four lengths of the pool.

== Records ==
The standing world and Olympic records prior to this competition were as follows. Clark's Olympic record was set as the first leg in the 4 × 200 metre freestyle relay final.

World record	Bruce Furniss (USA)	1:50.32	Kansas City, United States	21 August 1975
Olympic record	Mark Spitz (USA)	1:52.78	Munich, West Germany	29 August 1972

Making the final in the 1976 event required at least matching the Olympic record, with seven men coming in under that time and an eighth equaling it. Andrey Bogdanov held a new record briefly, swimming 1:52.71 in the second heat. Klaus Steinbach dropped more than a full second off that time in the next heat, though, with a time of 1:51.41. The fourth, fifth, and sixth heats saw four men swim between Bogdanov's and Steinbach's times. Bruce Furniss, swimming in the eighth heat, cut almost half a second off Steinbach's record, coming in at 1:50.93.

That record would not stand long; four men beat it in the final. Only one of those men came in under the world record however: Furniss bettered his own world and Olympic records with 1:50.29 to win gold.

== Schedule ==
All times are Eastern Daylight Time (UTC-4)

Date	Time	Round
Monday, 19 July 1976	9:30; 20:00	Heats; Final

== Results ==
=== Heats ===
Rank	Heat	Swimmer	Nation	Time	Notes
1	8	Bruce Furniss	United States	1:50.93	Q, OR
2	3	Klaus Steinbach	West Germany	1:51.41	Q, OR
3	4	Andrey Krylov	Soviet Union	1:51.42	Q
4	6	Jim Montgomery	United States	1:51.77	Q
5	5	Peter Nocke	West Germany	1:52.16	Q
6	5	Gordon Downie	Great Britain	1:52.47	Q
7	2	Andrey Bogdanov	Soviet Union	1:52.71	Q, OR
8	7	John Naber	United States	1:52.78	Q
9	2	Brian Brinkley	Great Britain	1:53.07	
10	1	Sergey Koplyakov	Soviet Union	1:53.44	
11	3	Marcello Guarducci	Italy	1:53.72	
12	5	Steve Badger	Canada	1:53.86	
13	6	Bill Sawchuk	Canada	1:54.07	
14	7	Jorge Delgado, Jr.	Ecuador	1:54.23	
15	4	Graham Windeatt	Australia	1:54.35	
16	8	Mark Kerry	Australia	1:54.86	
17	2	David López-Zubero	Spain	1:54.88	
18	8	Peter Dawson	Australia	1:55.16	
19	6	Rainer Strohbach	East Germany	1:55.25	
20	3	Roberto Pangaro	Italy	1:55.30	
21	7	Frank Pfütze	East Germany	1:55.57	
22	4	James Hett	Canada	1:55.58	
23	1	René van der Kuil	Netherlands	1:55.59	
24	4	Ali Gharbi	Tunisia	1:55.82	
25	7	Alan McClatchey	Great Britain	1:55.84	
26	3	Werner Lampe	West Germany	1:56.01	
27	1	Bengt Gingsjö	Sweden	1:56.31	
28	8	Peter Pettersson	Sweden	1:56.51	
29	7	Anders Bellbring	Sweden	1:57.20	
30	6	Paolo Revelli	Italy	1:57.25	
31	1	Fritz Warncke	Norway	1:57.59	
32	5	Andre in het Veld	Netherlands	1:57.60	
33	5	John McConnochie	New Zealand	1:57.77	
34	1	Tsuyoshi Yanagidate	Japan	1:58.04	
35	8	Guillermo García	Mexico	1:58.20	
36	2	Georgios Karpouzis	Greece	1:59.25	
37	2	Eduardo Pérez	Mexico	1:59.53	
38	7	Francisco Cañales	Puerto Rico	1:59.62	
39	1	Luis Goicoechea	Venezuela	1:59.68	
40	4	Steven Newkirk	Virgin Islands	1:59.95	
41	3	Kevin Williamson	Ireland	2:00.08	
42	6	Andy Knowles	Bahamas	2:00.18	
43	3	Nikolay Ganev	Bulgaria	2:00.54	
44	7	Petar Georgiev	Bulgaria	2:00.70	
45	2	Tomas Becerra	Colombia	2:00.72	
46	5	Mark Crocker	Hong Kong	2:00.81	
47	6	Lutz Löscher	East Germany	2:01.00	
48	1	Kris Sumono	Indonesia	2:01.12	
49	8	Sigurður Ólafsson	Iceland	2:01.18	
50	6	Gianni Versari	Panama	2:02.25	
51	5	Paulo Frischknecht	Portugal	2:02.65	
52	8	Gerardo Rosario	Philippines	2:02.81	
53	4	José Pereira	Portugal	2:03.03	
54	7	Patrick Novaretti	Monaco	2:04.29	
55	3	Frank Richardson	Nicaragua	2:12.33	

=== Final ===
Rank	Swimmer	Nation	Time	Notes
1st place, gold medalist(s)	Bruce Furniss	United States	1:50.29	WR
2nd place, silver medalist(s)	John Naber	United States	1:50.50	
3rd place, bronze medalist(s)	Jim Montgomery	United States	1:50.58	
4	Andrey Krylov	Soviet Union	1:50.73	
5	Klaus Steinbach	West Germany	1:51.09	
6	Peter Nocke	West Germany	1:51.71	
7	Gordon Downie	Great Britain	1:52.78	
8	Andrey Bogdanov	Soviet Union	1:53.33	
