= Swimming at the 1976 Summer Olympics – Men's 4 × 200 metre freestyle relay =

Men's 4 × 200 metre freestyle relay at the Games of the XXI Olympiad
- Venue: Olympic Pool
- Date: 21 July 1976 (heats & final)
- Competitors: 77 from 18 nations
- Teams: 18
- Winning time: 7:23.22 WR

Medalists
| 1st place, gold medalist(s) | | Mike Bruner, Bruce Furniss, John Naber, Jim Montgomery, Tim Shaw*, Doug Northway* | United States |
| 2nd place, silver medalist(s) | | Sergey Koplyakov, Andrey Krylov, Volodymyr Raskatov, Andrey Bogdanov, Andrey Smirnov*, Vladimir Mikheyev* | Soviet Union |
| 3rd place, bronze medalist(s) | | Alan McClatchey, David Dunne, Gordon Downie, Brian Brinkley; *Indicates the swimmer only competed in the preliminary heats. | Great Britain |

The men's 4 × 200 m freestyle relay event for the 1976 Summer Olympics was held in Montreal. The event took place on Wednesday, 21 July 1976.

== Results ==
=== Heats ===
Heat 1

| Place | Swimmers | Time | Notes |
|---|---|---|---|
| 1 | HaJo Geisler, Andreas Schmidt, Werner Lampe, Peter Nocke (FRG) | 7:37.59 | |
| 2 | Alan McClatchey, David Dunne, Gordon Downie, Brian Brinkley (GBR) | 7:37.92 | |
| 3 | Marcello Guarducci, Roberto Pangaro, Paolo Barelli, Paolo Revelli (ITA) | 7:41.39 | |
| 4 | Bent Brask, Arne Borgstrøm, Håkon Iversøn, Fritz Warncke (NOR) | 7:46.42 | |
| 5 | Marc Lazzaro, Benôit Laffineur, Colin Ress, Fabien Noël (FRA) | 7:47.39 | |
| 6 | Fernando Cañales, José-Ricardo de Jesús, Arnaldo Pérez, Francisco Cañales (PUR) | 8:05.21 | |

Heat 2

| Place | Swimmers | Time | Notes |
|---|---|---|---|
| 1 | Sergey Koplyakov, Andrey Krylov, Andrey Smirnov, Vladimir Mikheyev (URS) | 7:33.21 | |
| 2 | Roger Pyttel, Wilfried Hartung, Rainer Strohbach, Frank Pfütze (GDR) | 7:40.58 | |
| 3 | Graham Windeatt, Mark Tonelli, Peter Coughlan, Peter Dawson (AUS) | 7:44.42 | |
| 4 | Petar Georgiev, Stefan Georgiev, Toni Statelov, Nikolay Ganev (BUL) | 7:57.08 | |
| 5 | José Pereira, António de Melo, Rui Abreu, Paulo Frischknecht (POR) | 8:26.68 | |

Heat 3

| Place | Swimmers | Time | Notes |
|---|---|---|---|
| 1 | John Naber, Jim Montgomery, Doug Northway, Tim Shaw (USA) | 7:30.33 | |
| 2 | Pär Arvidsson, Peter Pettersson, Anders Bellbring, Bengt Gingsjö (SWE) | 7:41.82 | |
| 3 | Karim Ressang, René van der Kuil, Andre in het Veld, Henk Elzerman (NED) | 7:42.54 | |
| 4 | David López-Zubero, Jesús Fuentes, Fernando Gómez-Reino, Santiago Esteva (ESP) | 7:49.22 | |
| 5 | Guillermo García, Eduardo Pérez, Guillermo Zavala, José Luis Prado (MEX) | 8:05.12 | |
| 6 | Ramón Volcan, Andrés Arraez, Glen Sochasky, Luis Goicoechea (VEN) | 8:08.38 | |
| 7 | Steve Badger, Bill Sawchuk, Steve Pickell, James Hett (CAN) | | DQ |

=== Final ===
| Rank | Lane | Nation | Swimmers | Time | Notes |
|---|---|---|---|---|---|
| 1st place, gold medalist(s) | 4 | United States | Mike Bruner (1:52.35); Bruce Furniss (1:49.56); John Naber (1:51.29); Jim Montgomery (1:50.11) | 7:23.22 | WR |
| 2nd place, silver medalist(s) | 5 | Soviet Union | Vladimir Raskatov (1:52.69); Andrei Bogdanov (1:51.69); Sergey Kopliakov (1:52.54); Andrei Krylov (1:51.05) | 7:27.97 | |
| 3rd place, bronze medalist(s) | 6 | Great Britain | Alan McClatchey (1:54.09); David Dunne (1:54.67); Gordon Downie (1:52.10); Brian Brinkley (1:51.25) | 7:32.11 | |
| 4 | 3 | West Germany | Klaus Steinbach (1:52.18); Peter Nocke (1:51.19); Werner Lampe (1:54.06); Hans-Joachim Geisler (1:54.84) | 7:32.27 | |
| 5 | 2 | East Germany | Roger Pyttel (1:53.92); Wilfried Hartung (1:55.16); Rainer Strohbach (1:54.30); Frank Pfütze (1:55.54) | 7:38.92 | |
| 6 | 8 | Netherlands | Karim Ressang (1:55.63); René van der Kuil (1:55.17); André in het Veld (1:57.18); Henk Elzerman (1:54.58) | 7:42.56 | |
| 7 | 1 | Sweden | Pär Arvidsson (1:55.84); Peter Pettersson (1:56.14); Anders Bellbring (1:56.44); Bengt Gingsjö (1:54.42) | 7:42.84 | |
| 8 | 7 | Italy | Marcello Guarducci (1:53.72); Roberto Pangaro (1:55.74); Paolo Barelli (1:57.66); Paolo Revelli (1:56.27) | 7:43.39 | |
