= Swimming at the 1975 World Aquatics Championships – Men's 200 metre freestyle =

Men's 200 metre freestyle at the 1975 FINA World Championships
- Dates: 24 July 1975 (heats); 24 July 1975 (final)
- Competitors: 30
- Winning time: 1:51.04

Medalists
gold medal	Tim Shaw	United States
silver medal	Bruce Furniss	United States
bronze medal	Brian Brinkley	Great Britain

The men's 200 metre freestyle event at the 1975 World Aquatics Championships took place 24 July.

== Results ==
=== Heats ===
Rank	Swimmer	Nation	Time	Notes
1	Bruce Furniss	United States	1:52.35	CR
2	Tim Shaw	United States	1:52.77	CR
3	Brian Brinkley	United Kingdom	1:54.15	
4	Peter Nocke	West Germany	1:54.50	
5	Gordon Downie	United Kingdom	1:54.61	
6	Andrey Krylov	Soviet Union	1:55.62	
7	Graham Windeatt	Australia	1:55.73	
8	Jorge Delgado Jr.	Ecuador	1:55.79	
9	Roberto Pangaro	Italy	1:57.00	
10	Marcello Guarducci	Italy	1:57.08	
11	Andreas Meier	East Germany	1:57.25	
12	Aleksandr Samsonov	Soviet Union	1:57.48	
13	Bengt Gingsjo	Sweden	1:57.81	
14	Werner Lampe	West Germany	1:57.99	
15	Brett Naylor	New Zealand	1:58.01	
16	Wilfried Hartung	East Germany	1:58.12	
17	Marc Lazzaro	France	1:58.31	
18	Colin Ress	France	1:58.38	
19	Toni Statelov	Bulgaria	2:00.92	
20	Michael Ker	Canada	2:00.70	
21	Bruce Robertson	Canada	2:00.77	
22	Paul Jouanneau	Brazil	2:02.33	
23	Guillermo Pacheco	Peru	2:02.86	
24	Josy Wilwert	Luxembourg	2:03.23	
25	Tomas Alberto Becerra	Colombia	2:03.52	
26	Leonardo Parafita	Argentina	2:06.36	
27	Freddy Clavijo	Colombia	2:06.87	
28	Alfredo Mackliff	Ecuador	2:09.92	
29	Lee Chang-Cheng	Chinese Taipei	2:10.48	
30	Gianni Versari	Panama	2:10.91	

=== Final ===
Rank	Name	Nationality	Time	Notes
1st place, gold medalist(s)	Tim Shaw	United States	1:51.04	CR
2nd place, silver medalist(s)	Bruce Furniss	United States	1:51.72	
3rd place, bronze medalist(s)	Brian Brinkley	United Kingdom	1:53.56	
4	Andrey Krylov	Soviet Union	1:54.23	
5	Peter Nocke	West Germany	1:54.81	
6	Gordon Downie	United Kingdom	1:55.08	
7	Jorge Delgado Jr.	Ecuador	1:55.27	
8	Graham Windeatt	Australia	1:56.23	
