= Swimming at the 1975 World Aquatics Championships – Men's 100 metre freestyle =

Men's 100 metre freestyle at the 1975 FINA World Championships
- Dates: 27 July 1975 (heats); 27 July 1975 (final)
- Competitors: 31
- Winning time: 51.25 seconds

Medalists
gold medal	Andy Coan	United States
silver medal	Vladimir Bure	Soviet Union
bronze medal	Jim Montgomery	United States

The men's 100 metre freestyle event at the 1975 World Aquatics Championships took place 27 July.

== Results ==
=== Heats ===
Rank	Swimmer	Nation	Time	Notes
1	Andy Coan	United States	51.23	CR
2	Klaus Steinbach	West Germany	51.93	
3	Jim Montgomery	United States	52.13	
4	Peter Nocke	West Germany	52.44	
5	Vladimir Bure	Soviet Union	52.48	
6	Marcello Guarducci	Italy	52.61	
7	Roberto Pangaro	Italy	53.06	
8	Robert Kasting	Canada	53.35	
9	Georgijs Kulikovs	Soviet Union	53.92	
10	Rui Oliveira	Brazil	53.93	
11	Stefan Georgiev	Bulgaria	53.95	
12	Jorge Delgado Jr.	Ecuador	53.96	
13	Jorge Comas Lopez	Spain	54.26	
14	Steve Pickell	Canada	54.27	
15	Wilfried Hartung	East Germany	54.36	
16	Benoit Leffineur	France	54.44	
17	Rene Ecuyer	France	54.55	
18	Toni Statelov	Bulgaria	54.57	
19	Graham Windeatt	Australia	54.76	
20	Gianni Versari	Panama	54.77	
21	Ulrich Bar	East Germany	55.47	
22	Brett Naylor	New Zealand	55.96	
23	Guillermo Pacheco	Peru	56.07	
23	Leonardo Parafita	Argentina	56.07	
25	Helmuth Levy	Colombia	56.19	
26	Paul Jouanneau	Brazil	56.24	
27	Gary Jameson	United Kingdom	56.83	
28	Alfredo Mackliff	Ecuador	57.36	
29	Helmut Podolan	Austria	57.80	
30	Tomas Alberto Becerra	Colombia	57.91	
31	Lee Chang-Cheng	Chinese Taipei	57.99	

=== Final ===
Rank	Name	Nationality	Time	Notes
1st place, gold medalist(s)	Andy Coan	United States	51.25	CR
2nd place, silver medalist(s)	Vladimir Bure	Soviet Union	51.32	
3rd place, bronze medalist(s)	Jim Montgomery	United States	51.44	
4	Peter Nocke	West Germany	52.15	
5	Klaus Steinbach	West Germany	52.20	
6	Marcello Guarducci	Italy	52.55	
7	Roberto Pangaro	Italy	52.66	
8	Robert Kasting	Canada	53.71	
