= Swimming at the 1976 Summer Olympics – Men's 100 metre freestyle =

Men's 100 metre freestyle at the Games of the XXI Olympiad
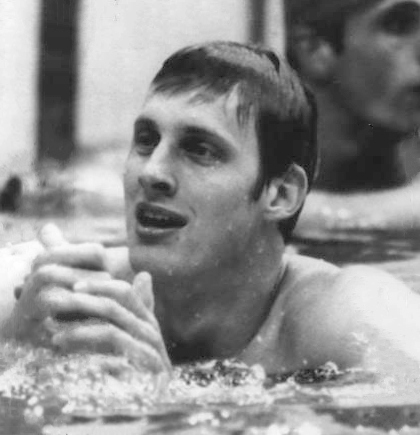
- Jim Montgomery
- Venue: Olympic Pool
- Dates: 24 July 1976 (heats & semifinals); 25 July 1976 (finals)
- Competitors: 41 from 27 nations
- Winning time: 49.99 WR

Medalists
1st place, gold medalist(s)		Jim Montgomery; United States
2nd place, silver medalist(s)		Jack Babashoff; United States
3rd place, bronze medalist(s)		Peter Nocke; West Germany

The men's 100 metre freestyle event at the 1976 Summer Olympics took place between July 24 and 25. This was the first time in history that the 100m freestyle was swum under 50 seconds. There were 41 competitors from 27 nations. Nations had been limited to three swimmers each since the 1924 Games (except in 1960, when the limit was two). The event was won by Jim Montgomery of the United States, the nation's second consecutive and tenth overall victory in the men's 100 metre freestyle (most of any nation). His countryman Jack Babashoff took silver. Peter Nocke's bronze was the first medal for West Germany in the event, though the United Team of Germany had won a bronze in 1964 (by West German Hans-Joachim Klein).

== Background ==
This was the 17th appearance of the men's 100 metre freestyle. The event has been held at every Summer Olympics except 1900 (when the shortest freestyle was the 200 metres), though the 1904 version was measured in yards rather than metres.

Three of the eight finalists from the 1972 Games returned: bronze medalist Vladimir Bure of the Soviet Union, seventh-place finisher Michel Rousseau of France, and eighth-place finisher Klaus Steinbach of West Germany. Reigning gold medalist Mark Spitz had retired after the 1972 Games at the age of 22. The new American favorite was Jim Montgomery, who had set the world record at the 1975 AAU championships. His main challenger would have been Jonty Skinner, but apartheid South Africa was banned from the Olympics. Montgomery had finished third at the 1975 world championships behind Andy Coan (not competing in Montreal) and Bure.

Bulgaria, Ecuador, Nicaragua, and the Virgin Islands each made their debut in the event. The United States made its 17th appearance, having competed at each edition of the event to date.

== Competition format ==
The competition used a three-round (heats, semifinals, final) format. The advancement rule followed the format introduced in 1952, though with 2 semifinals. Swim-offs were used as necessary to break ties. A swimmer's place in the heat was not used to determine advancement; instead, the fastest times from across all heats in a round were used. There were 6 heats, with between 6 and 8 swimmers each. The top 16 swimmers advanced to the semifinals. There were 2 semifinals of 8 swimmers each. The top 8 swimmers advanced to the final.

This swimming event used freestyle swimming, which means that the method of the stroke is not regulated (unlike backstroke, breaststroke, and butterfly events). Nearly all swimmers use the front crawl or a variant of that stroke. Because an Olympic size swimming pool is 50 metres long, this race consisted of two lengths of the pool.

== Records ==
Prior to this competition, the existing world and Olympic records were as follows.

World record	Jim Montgomery (USA)	50.59	Kansas City, United States	23 August 1975
Olympic record	Mark Spitz (USA)	51.22	Munich, West Germany	3 September 1972

Jim Montgomery broke the world record in the first semifinal, posting a 50.39 second time. In the final, he was the first swimmer to break the 50-second barrier, winning in 49.99 seconds for the new world record.

== Schedule ==
All times are Eastern Daylight Time (UTC-4)

Date	Time	Round
Saturday, 24 July 1976	11:00; 19:00	Heats; Semifinals
Sunday, 25 July 1976	20:15	Final

== Results ==
=== Heats ===
Rank	Heat	Swimmer	Nation	Time	Notes
1	5	Joe Bottom	United States	51.47	Q
1	3	Klaus Steinbach	West Germany	51.47	Q
3	3	Jack Babashoff	United States	51.53	Q
4	2	Marcello Guarducci	Italy	51.57	Q
5	5	Peter Nocke	West Germany	51.59	Q
6	4	Vladimir Bure	Soviet Union	51.81	Q
7	4	Andrey Krylov	Soviet Union	52.02	Q
8	6	Jim Montgomery	United States	52.13	Q
9	6	Michel Rousseau	France	52.43	Q
10	2	Steve Pickell	Canada	52.65	Q
11	4	Gary MacDonald	Canada	52.91	Q
12	6	Roberto Pangaro	Italy	53.05	Q
13	2	Martin Smith	Great Britain	53.17	Q
14	2	René Écuyer	France	53.20	Q
14	4	Svante Rasmuson	Sweden	53.20	Q
16	1	Andrey Bogdanov	Soviet Union	53.23	QSO
16	6	Kevin Burns	Great Britain	53.23	QSO
18	4	Glenn Patching	Australia	53.29	
19	5	Bruce Robertson	Canada	53.37	
20	5	Peter Coughlan	Australia	53.49	
21	2	Ramón Volcan	Venezuela	53.53	
22	6	Fritz Warncke	Norway	53.55	
23	5	Dan Larsson	Sweden	53.81	
24	1	Stefan Georgiev	Bulgaria	53.85	
25	3	Jorge Delgado, Jr.	Ecuador	53.91	
26	1	Roger Pyttel	East Germany	53.93	
27	3	Neil Rogers	Australia	53.96	
28	1	Dirk Braunleder	West Germany	54.04	
29	1	Jorge Comas	Spain	54.05	
30	5	Gianni Versari	Panama	54.11	
31	1	Mark Crocker	Hong Kong	54.14	
32	3	Paul Jouanneau	Brazil	54.49	
33	2	Helmut Levy	Colombia	54.60	
34	1	Kozo Higuchi	Japan	54.67	
35	6	Fernando Cañales	Puerto Rico	55.31	
36	5	Steven Newkirk	Virgin Islands	55.43	
37	6	José Pereira	Portugal	55.46	
38	2	Kris Sumono	Indonesia	55.50	
39	4	Gerardo Rosario	Philippines	56.00	
40	6	Sigurður Ólafsson	Iceland	56.01	
41	3	Campari Knoepffler	Nicaragua	58.48	

Swim-off

Rank	Swimmer	Nation	Time	Notes
1	Andrey Bogdanov	Soviet Union	52.82	Q
2	Kevin Burns	Great Britain	53.11	

=== Semifinals ===
Rank	Heat	Swimmer	Nation	Time	Notes
1	1	Jim Montgomery	United States	50.39	Q, WR
2	1	Marcello Guarducci	Italy	51.35	Q
3	2	Jack Babashoff	United States	51.46	Q
4	1	Klaus Steinbach	West Germany	51.62	Q
5	2	Peter Nocke	West Germany	51.83	Q
6	2	Joe Bottom	United States	51.92	Q
7	1	Vladimir Bure	Soviet Union	51.93	Q
8	2	Andrey Krylov	Soviet Union	52.32	Q
9	2	Michel Rousseau	France	52.36	
10	1	Roberto Pangaro	Italy	52.68	
11	1	Stephen Pickell	Canada	52.89	
12	1	René Ecuyer	France	52.92	
13	2	Gary MacDonald	Canada	52.96	
14	1	Andrei Bogdanov	Soviet Union	53.05	
15	2	Martin Smith	Great Britain	53.11	
16	2	Svante Rasmussen	Sweden	53.34	

=== Final ===
Rank	Swimmer	Nation	Time	Notes
1st place, gold medalist(s)	Jim Montgomery	United States	49.99	WR
2nd place, silver medalist(s)	Jack Babashoff	United States	50.81	
3rd place, bronze medalist(s)	Peter Nocke	West Germany	51.31	
4	Klaus Steinbach	West Germany	51.68	
5	Marcello Guarducci	Italy	51.70	
6	Joe Bottom	United States	51.79	
7	Vladimir Bure	Soviet Union	52.03	
8	Andrey Krylov	Soviet Union	52.15	
