= Swimming at the 1973 World Aquatics Championships – Men's 200 metre freestyle =

Men's 200 metre freestyle at the 1973 World Aquatics Championships
- Dates: September 4, 1973
- Winning time: 1:53.02

Medalists
gold medal	Jim Montgomery	United States
silver medal	Kurt Krumpholz	United States
bronze medal	Roger Pyttel	East Germany

The men's 200 metre freestyle competition of the swimming events at the 1973 World Aquatics Championships took place on September 4.

== Records ==
Prior to the competition, the existing world and championship records were as follows.

World record	Mark Spitz (USA)	1:52.78	Munich, West Germany	29 August 1972
Competition record	N/A	N/A	N/A	N/A

The following records were established during the competition:

Date	Event	Name	Nationality	Time	Record
4 September	Heat	Werner Lampe	East Germany	1:57.621	CR
4 September	Heat	Vladimir Bure	Soviet Union	1:57.145	CR
4 September	Heat	Roger Pyttel	East Germany	1:57.090	CR
4 September	Heat	Kurt Krumpholz	United States	1:54.582	CR
4 September	Final	Jim Montgomery	United States	1:53.02	CR

== Results ==
=== Heats ===
?? swimmers participated in 6 heats, qualified swimmers are listed:

Rank	Heat	Lane	Name	Nationality	Time	Notes
1	5	-	Kurt Krumpholz	United States	1:54.582	Q, CR
2	6	-	Jim Montgomery	United States	1:56.737	Q
3	4	-	Roger Pyttel	East Germany	1:57.090	Q, CR
4	2	-	Vladimir Bure	Soviet Union	1:57.145	Q, CR
5	3	-	Peter Nocke	West Germany	1:57.346	Q
6	6	-	Brian Brinkley	Great Britain	1:57.423	Q
7	5	-	Steve Badger	Australia	1:57.433	Q
8	6	-	Bernt Zarnowiecki	Sweden	1:57.509	Q
9	2	-	Wilfried Hartung	East Germany	1:57.518	
10	1	-	Werner Lampe	West Germany	1:57.621	CR
11	4	-	Jorge Delgado	Ecuador	1:57.750	
12	3	-	Aleksandr Samsonov	Soviet Union	1:57.819	
13	4	-	José Namorado	Brazil	1:57.820	
14	1	-	Bruce Robertson	Canada	1:58.211	
15	1	-	Michael Wenden	Australia	1:58.260	
16	5	-	Arnaldo Cinquetti	Italy	1:58.407	
17	2	-	Fritz Warncke	Norway	1:59.408	
18	3	-	Ian MacKenzie	Canada	1:59.510	

=== Final ===
The results of the final are below.

Rank	Lane	Name	Nationality	Time	Notes
1st place, gold medalist(s)	5	Jim Montgomery	United States	1:53.02	CR
2nd place, silver medalist(s)	4	Kurt Krumpholz	United States	1:53.61	
3rd place, bronze medalist(s)	3	Roger Pyttel	East Germany	1:53.97	
4	1	Steve Badger	Australia	1:55.66	
5	7	Brian Brinkley	Great Britain	1:56.42	NR
6	6	Vladimir Bure	Soviet Union	1:56.45	
7	8	Bernt Zarnowiecki	Sweden	1:56.58	
8	2	Peter Nocke	West Germany	1:58.97	
