= Swimming at the 1973 World Aquatics Championships – Men's 4 × 200 metre freestyle relay =

Men's 4 × 200 metre freestyle relay at the 1973 World Aquatics Championships
- Dates: September 7, 1973
- Nations: 12
- Winning time: 7:33.221 WR

Medalists
gold medal	Kurt Krumpholz; Robin Backhaus; Richard Klatt; Jim Montgomery	United States
silver medal	John Kulasalu; Steve Badger; Brad Cooper; Michael Wenden	Australia
bronze medal	Klaus Steinbach; Werner Lampe; Peter Nocke; Folkert Meeuw	West Germany

The men's 4 × 200 metre freestyle relay competition of the swimming events at the 1973 World Aquatics Championships took place on September 7.

== Records ==
Prior to the competition, the existing world and championship records were as follows.

World record	United States (USA); John Kinsella (); Fred Tyler (); Steve Genter (1:52.78); Mark Spitz (1:54.24)	7:35.78	Munich, West Germany	31 August 1972
Competition record	N/A	N/A	N/A	N/A

The following records were established during the competition:

Date	Event	Nation	Athletes	Time	Record
7 September	Heat	France		7:51.455	CR
7 September	Heat	Australia		7:48.432	CR
7 September	Final	United States	Kurt Krumpholz; Robin Backhaus; Richard Klatt; Jim Montgomery	7:33.221	WR

== Results ==
=== Heats ===
12 teams participated in 2 heats.

Rank	Heat	Lane	Nation	Athletes	Time	Notes
1	2	-	Australia	John Kulasalu; Steve Badger; Brad Cooper; Michael Wenden	7:48.432	Q, CR
2	1	-	France		7:51.455	Q, CR
3	2	-	West Germany		7:52.244	Q
4	1	-	Sweden		7:52.298	Q
5	2	-	Soviet Union		7:52.968	Q
6	2	-	East Germany		7:53.635	Q
7	2	-	Great Britain		7:54.257	Q, NR
8	1	-	United States		7:54.404	Q
9	1	-	Canada		7:58.432	
10	1	-	Italy		7:58.515	
11	2	-	Brazil		8:12.066	
12	1	-	Puerto Rico		8:23.574	

=== Final ===
The results of the final are below.

Rank	Lane	Nation	Athletes	Time	Notes
1st place, gold medalist(s)	8	United States	Kurt Krumpholz; Robin Backhaus; Richard Klatt; Jim Montgomery	7:33.221	WR
2nd place, silver medalist(s)	4	Australia	John Kulasalu (1:57.49); Steve Badger (1:55.97); Brad Cooper (1:54.29); Michael Wenden (1:55.91)	7:43.659	CWR
3rd place, bronze medalist(s)	3	West Germany	Klaus Steinbach; Werner Lampe; Peter Nocke; Folkert Meeuw	7:43.684	
4	7	East Germany	Roger Pyttel; Peter Bruch; Wilfried Hartung; Lutz Unger	7:44.444	
5	6	Sweden	Bernt Zarnowiecki; Bengt Gingsjö; Anders Bellbring; Gunnar Larsson	7:45.585	
6	2	Soviet Union	Viktor Aboimov; Vladimir Krivtsov; Aleksandr Samsonov; Vladimir Bure	7:47.794	
7	1	Great Britain	Brian Brinkley; Raymond Terrell; Colin Cunningham; Gordon Downie	7:54.305	
8	5	France	Patrick Moreau; Pierre Amardeilh; Olivier Middleton; Marc Lazzaro	8:04.452	
