= Swimming at the 1980 Summer Olympics – Men's 200 metre freestyle =

Men's 200 metre freestyle at the Games of the XXII Olympiad
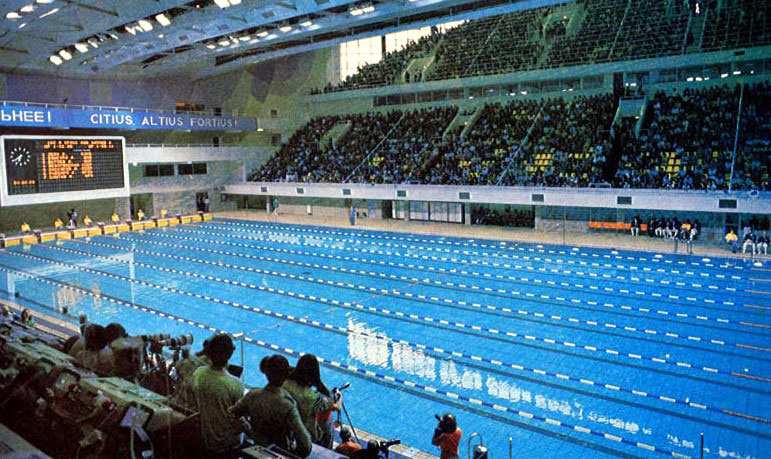
- The pool at Olimpiysky Sports Complex
- Venue: Swimming Pool at the Olimpiysky Sports Complex
- Date: 21 July 1980 (heats & final)
- Competitors: 42 from 24 nations
- Winning time: 1:49.81 OR

Medalists
1st place, gold medalist(s)		Sergey Koplyakov	Soviet Union
2nd place, silver medalist(s)		Andrey Krylov	Soviet Union
3rd place, bronze medalist(s)		Graeme Brewer	Australia

The men's 200 metre freestyle event at the 1980 Summer Olympics was held on 21 July at the Swimming Pool at the Olimpiysky Sports Complex. There were 42 competitors from 24 nations, with each nation having up to three swimmers. The event was won by Sergey Koplyakov of the Soviet Union, with his fellow countryman Andrey Krylov finishing second. The medals were the first for the Soviet Union in the men's 200 metre freestyle. Graeme Brewer of Australia won that nation's first medal in the event since 1968 with his bronze.

== Background ==
This was the sixth appearance of the 200 metre freestyle event. It was first contested in 1900. It would be contested a second time, though at 220 yards, in 1904. After that, the event did not return until 1968; since then, it has been on the programme at every Summer Games.

One of the 8 finalists from the 1976 Games returned: fourth-place finisher Andrey Krylov of the Soviet Union. The American-led boycott severely impacted swimming in 1980; the United States had swept this event in 1976. The 1978 World Aquatics Championships winner and runner-up were Americans; neither Bill Forrester nor Rowdy Gaines (who also held the world record) could compete. World bronze medalist Sergey Koplyakov of the Soviet Union was the favourite in their absence.

Algeria, Angola, Czechoslovakia, Lebanon, Mozambique, Vietnam, and Zimbabwe each made their debut in the event. Australia made its sixth appearance, the only nation to have competed in all prior editions of the event other than the absent United States.

== Competition format ==
The competition used a two-round (heats, final) format. The advancement rule followed the format introduced in 1952. A swimmer's place in the heat was not used to determine advancement; instead, the fastest times from across all heats in a round were used. There were 8 heats of up to 8 swimmers each. The top 8 swimmers advanced to the final. Swim-offs were used as necessary to break ties.

This swimming event used freestyle swimming, which means that the method of the stroke is not regulated (unlike backstroke, breaststroke, and butterfly events). Nearly all swimmers use the front crawl or a variant of that stroke. Because an Olympic-size swimming pool is 50 metres long, this race consisted of four lengths of the pool.

== Records ==
Prior to this competition, the existing world and Olympic records were as follows.

World record	Rowdy Gaines (USA)	1:49.16	Austin, United States	11 April 1980
Olympic record	Bruce Furniss (USA)	1:50.29	Montreal, Canada	19 July 1976

The following records were established during the competition:

Date	Event	Swimmer	Nation	Time	Record
21 July	Final	Sergey Koplyakov	Soviet Union	1:49.81	OR

== Schedule ==
All times are Moscow Time (UTC+3)

Date	Time	Round
Monday, 21 July 1980	10:00; 20:00	Heats; Final

== Results ==
=== Heats ===
Rank	Heat	Swimmer	Nation	Time	Notes
1	6	Sergey Koplyakov	Soviet Union	1:51.04	Q
2	5	Andrey Krylov	Soviet Union	1:51.21	Q
3	6	Graeme Brewer	Australia	1:51.92	Q
4	4	Jörg Woithe	East Germany	1:52.33	Q
5	1	Paolo Revelli	Italy	1:52.56	Q
6	2	Fabrizio Rampazzo	Italy	1:52.62	Q
7	4	Ron McKeon	Australia	1:52.66	Q
8	4	Thomas Lejdström	Sweden	1:53.04	Q
9	3	David López-Zubero	Spain	1:53.22	
10	2	Fabien Noël	France	1:53.25	
11	5	Detlev Grabs	East Germany	1:53.38	
12	3	Ivar Stukolkin	Soviet Union	1:53.44	
13	1	Per Wikström	Sweden	1:53.59	
14	6	Frank Kühne	East Germany	1:53.63	
15	4	Martin Smith	Great Britain	1:54.17	
16	3	Jorge Fernandes	Brazil	1:54.32	
17	5	Marcus Mattioli	Brazil	1:54.39	
18	6	Petar Kochanov	Bulgaria	1:54.45	
19	4	Cyro Delgado	Brazil	1:54.59	
20	6	Jean-Marie François	Venezuela	1:54.76	
21	1	Paulo Frischknecht	Portugal	1:55.06	
22	6	Radek Havel	Czechoslovakia	1:55.07	
23	1	Rui Abreu	Portugal	1:55.25	
24	2	Peter Drost	Netherlands	1:55.41	
25	2	Per-Ola Quist	Sweden	1:55.38	
26	2	Kevin Lee	Great Britain	1:55.63	
27	3	Alberto Mestre	Venezuela	1:55.69	
28	5	Petr Adamec	Czechoslovakia	1:55.84	
29	6	Tsvetan Golomeev	Bulgaria	1:55.88	
30	1	Dominique Petit	France	1:56.01	
31	4	Cees Jan Winkel	Netherlands	1:56.48	
32	2	Borut Petrič	Yugoslavia	1:56.51	
33	1	Guy Goosen	Zimbabwe	1:56.58	
34	3	Ramón Lavín	Spain	1:56.99	
35	3	Kevin Williamson	Ireland	1:57.37	
36	5	Stéfan Voléry	Switzerland	1:57.69	
37	2	Reda Yadi	Algeria	2:06.26	
38	4	Adham Hemdan	Kuwait	2:07.51	
39	3	Tô Văn Vệ	Vietnam	2:11.51	
40	2	Jorge Lima	Angola	2:14.37	
41	1	Bilall Yamouth	Lebanon	2:27.94	
42	4	Ntewane Machel	Mozambique	2:35.45	
	1	Mohamed Bendahmane	Algeria	DNS	
	3	Mark Lazzaro	France	DNS	
	5	Mark Tonelli	Australia	DNS	
	5	Rafael Vidal	Venezuela	DNS	
	5	Mohamed Halimi	Algeria	DNS	
	6	David Cummins	Ireland	DNS	

=== Final ===
Rank	Swimmer	Nation	Time	Notes
1st place, gold medalist(s)	Sergey Koplyakov	Soviet Union	1:49.81	OR
2nd place, silver medalist(s)	Andrey Krylov	Soviet Union	1:50.76	
3rd place, bronze medalist(s)	Graeme Brewer	Australia	1:51.60	
4	Jörg Woithe	East Germany	1:51.86	
5	Ron McKeon	Australia	1:52.60	
6	Paolo Revelli	Italy	1:52.76	
7	Thomas Lejdström	Sweden	1:52.94	
8	Fabrizio Rampazzo	Italy	1:53.25	
