= Swimming at the 1973 World Aquatics Championships – Men's 400 metre freestyle =

Men's 400 metre freestyle at the 1973 World Aquatics Championships
- Dates: September 6, 1973
- Competitors: 27 from 18 nations
- Winning time: 3:58.18 WR

Medalists
gold medal	Rick DeMont	United States
silver medal	Brad Cooper	Australia
bronze medal	Bengt Gingsjö	Sweden

The men's 400 metre freestyle competition of the swimming events at the 1973 World Aquatics Championships took place on September 6.

== Records ==
Prior to the competition, the existing world and championship records were as follows.

World record	Kurt Krumpholz (USA)	4:00.11	Chicago, United States	4 August 1972
Competition record	N/A	N/A	N/A	N/A

The following records were established during the competition:

Date	Event	Name	Nationality	Time	Record
6 September	Heat	Brad Cooper	Australia	4:02.38	CR
6 September	Final	Rick DeMont	United States	3:58.18	WR

== Results ==
=== Heats ===
27 swimmers participated in 4 heats.

Rank	Heat	Lane	Name	Nationality	Time	Notes
1	1	-	Brad Cooper	Australia	4:02.38	Q, CR
2	3	-	Bengt Gingsjö	Sweden	4:04.35	Q
3	4	-	Rick DeMont	United States	4:04.77	Q
4	1	-	Anders Bellbring	Sweden	4:05.77	Q
5	1	-	Andreas Apel	East Germany	4:06.13	Q
6	3	-	Tim Shaw	United States	4:06.57	Q
7	4	-	Werner Lampe	West Germany	4:07.01	Q
8	2	-	John Kulasalu	Australia	4:09.32	Q
9	3	-	Arnaldo Cinquetti	Italy	4:09.37	
10	4	-	Wilfried Hartung	East Germany	4:10.90	
11	3	-	Deane Buckboro	Canada	4:11.72	
12	2	-	Vladimir Mikheyev	Soviet Union	4:13.79	
13	4	-	José Namorado	Brazil	4:14.37	
14	4	-	G Castillo	Mexico	4:15.22	
15	4	-	Mark Treffers	New Zealand	4:15.81	
16	2	-	Dusan Grozaj	West Germany	4:16.23	
17	2	-	Paul Jouanneau	Brazil	4:18.19	
18	1	-	Marc Lazzaro	France	4:18.43	
19	3	-	Leonid Dragunov	Soviet Union	4:18.79	
20	2	-	Michael Ker	Canada	4:20.10	
21	2	-	Ali Gharbi	Tunisia	4:20.18	
22	4	-	Alberto Vivoni	Puerto Rico	4:22.02	
23	3	-	Csaba Tóth	Hungary	4:22.26	
24	1	-	Krasimir Enchev	Bulgaria	4:24.53	
25	2	-	Francisco Canales	Puerto Rico	4:24.65	
26	3	-	Ali Kinawi	Egypt	4:25.71	
27	1	-	Josy Wilwert	Luxembourg	4:39.02	

=== Final ===
The results of the final are below.

Rank	Lane	Name	Nationality	Time	Notes
1st place, gold medalist(s)	3	Rick DeMont	United States	3:58.18	WR
2nd place, silver medalist(s)	4	Brad Cooper	Australia	3:58.70	CWR
3rd place, bronze medalist(s)	5	Bengt Gingsjö	Sweden	4:01.27	
4	7	Tim Shaw	United States	4:01.56	
5	6	Anders Bellbring	Sweden	4:04.36	
6	2	Andreas Apel	East Germany	4:04.92	
7	1	Werner Lampe	West Germany	4:09.83	
8	8	John Kulasalu	Australia	4:14.62	
