= Bruce Furniss =

American swimmer (born 1957)

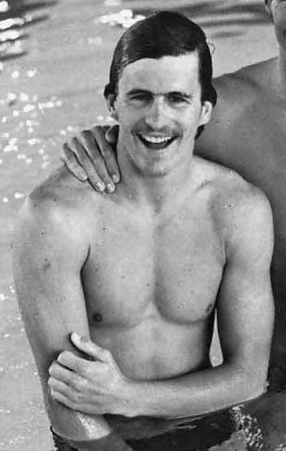
- Furniss in 1976

Personal information
- Full name: Bruce MacFarlane Furniss
- National team: United States
- Born: May 27, 1957 (age 69) Fresno, California, U.S.
- Height: 6 ft 0 in (1.83 m)
- Weight: 161 lb (73 kg)

Sport
- Sport: Swimming
- Strokes: Freestyle, individual medley
- Club: Long Beach Swim Club
- College team: University of Southern California
- Coach: Dick Jochums; Long Beach Swim Club; Peter Daland; USC
Medal record
Representing the United States
Olympic Games
| Gold medal – first place | 1976 Montreal | 200 m freestyle |
| Gold medal – first place | 1976 Montreal | 4×200 m freestyle |
World Championships (LC)
| Gold medal – first place | 1975 Cali | 4×100 m freestyle |
| Gold medal – first place | 1978 West Berlin | 4×200 m freestyle |
| Silver medal – second place | 1975 Cali | 200 m freestyle |
| Silver medal – second place | 1975 Cali | 400 m freestyle |

Bruce MacFarlane Furniss (born May 27, 1957) is an American former amateur competition swimmer, Olympic double gold medalist, and ten-time world record-holder in four events. At the 1976 Summer Olympics in Montreal, Quebec, he won the Men's 200-meter Freestyle and was a member of the winning U.S. team in the Men's 4×200-meter Freestyle Relay, both in world record time. Furniss broke ten world and nineteen American records, and won eleven Amateur Athletic Union and six NCAA titles.

Furniss was an individual medley swimmer, most recognized for his freestyle technique.

== Swimming career ==
=== Foothill High School (North Tustin, CA) ===
Furniss is a 1975 graduate of Tustin, California's Foothill High School where he was coached by Tom Delong, California Interscholastic Federation's all-time winningest high school swim coach. As a Junior at the 1974 CIF-SS Championships, Furniss broke Mark Spitz's National Interscholastic High School Record in the 200-yard Individual Medley and then topped the record again at the same championship in 1975. Furniss-led teams won the CIF-SS Championship Title in 1972, 1973 and 1974. Two of those years, Furniss teamed with Rod Strachan, whom Furniss would later swim with at USC and with whom he was a teammate on the 1976 U.S. Olympic Men's Swim Team. At the 1976 Olympic Games, Strachan would best Bruce's older brother, Steve, winning the Olympic gold medal in the 400-meter Individual Medley in a world record time.

=== University of Southern California (Los Angeles, CA) ===
Furniss was an integral part of USC's NCAA National Collegiate Championship winning teams of 1976 and 1977. While at USC, Furniss was coached by the legendary Peter Daland, who guided the school's men's swimming team to nine National Titles in his 35 years as the school's coach (1957 to 1992). During his time at USC, Furniss was one of five Trojans who would make the 1976 twenty-six member Men's USA Olympic Swimming Team (each Olympic Swimming Medalists). Joining Furniss was older brother Steve, 1977 James E. Sullivan Award Winner, John Naber, Joe Bottom, and Rod Strachan.

All four Furniss brothers attended, competed and graduated from USC. Each would swim and/or play water polo for the Trojans. Both Steve and Bruce shared in the school's 1976 National Team Title, which at the time, was by the largest margin of victory.

=== 1976 Olympics (Montreal, Quebec, Canada) ===
Furniss was a member of the 1976 U.S. Olympic men's swimming team, which was coached by three American swimming giants, Indiana University's Doc Counsilman, Santa Clara Swim Club's George Haines, and the University of Alabama's Don Gambril, all International Swimming Hall of Fame Coaches. The 1976 U.S. Olympic Men's Swim Team dominated, winning 12 of 13 (92%) possible gold medals and 27 of 35 (77%) possible total medals. Furniss won Olympic gold in the 200-meter freestyle, (one of three Americans to win this Olympic event; Mark Spitz in 1972 and Michael Phelps in 2008 being the other two), and the 4×200-meter freestyle relay, setting world records in each event. On July 19, 1976, the second day of the 1976 Olympic swimming program, Furniss won the 200-meter freestyle with a winning time of 1:50.29, leading an American sweep finishing ahead of fellow Americans John Naber (silver) and Jim Montgomery (bronze). Two days later, on July 21, 1976, he teamed up with Naber, Montgomery and Mike Bruner on the 4×200-meter freestyle relay with a winning time of 7:23.22. On that relay, Furniss, who swam the second leg, became the first person to break the 1:50 second barrier, splitting 1:49.56 (53.77/55.79).

=== 1975 & 1978 World championships ===
Furniss also garnered two gold and two silver medals in the 1975 World Aquatics Championships in Cali, Colombia and 1978 World Aquatics Championships in West Berlin.

=== World records ===
As a 7-year-old in 1964, Furniss was inspired by the four gold medal performance of American swimmer Don Schollander, who broke the 200-meter freestyle world record eleven times during his career. Twelve years later, Furniss became the twelfth of fourteen Americans in history to break the 200-meter freestyle world record. During his career he broke the 200-meter freestyle world record four different times. At the 1975 World Swimming Championships team trials in the Belmont Plaza pool in Long Beach, CA, Furniss accomplished the rare feat of breaking the 200-meter freestyle world record twice on the same day (June 18, 1975). Later that same summer, Furniss would break the world record in the event for the third time at the 1975 AAU Senior National Outdoor Championships in Kansas City, KS. His fourth crack of the event’s world mark occurred in the 1976 Men's 200-meter Freestyle Olympic Final.

Furniss also broke the world record in the Men's 200-meter individual medley at the 1975 AAU Senior National Outdoor Championships in Kansas City, KS. He laid claim to the 200-meter freestyle world record from 1975 to 1979 and the 200-meter individual medley world record from 1975 to 1977. In total Furniss either broke or was on relay teams that broke ten world records in four different events over a three year period.

=== Sibling rivalry ===
Furniss is the third of three successful aquatic brothers, often referred to as "Orange County California's First Family of Swimming." Older brother Steve Furniss, a two-time swimming Olympian (1972 Bronze Medalist in the Men's 200-meter Individual Medley and 1976 U. S. Men’s Olympic Swim Team Captain), and Bruce are among a rare group of siblings, in any sport, to make the same Olympic team.

Oldest brother, Chip, a USC Collegiate Swimming All-American, finished fifth in the 1972 Olympic Swimming Trials in the 200-meter Butterfly (behind Mark Spitz and Gary Hall Sr). Youngest brother, Craig, also attended USC, where he was a two-time Collegiate All-American Water Polo Player and was USC's Valedictorian of his 1981 graduating class.

Bruce and Steve remain in an exclusive group of three sets of brothers to win Olympic swimming medals, joining Duke Kahanamoku and Samuel Kahanamoku and Spain's David Lopez-Zubero and Martin Lopez-Zubero.

The Furniss family's impact on competitive aquatics goes beyond competing in swimming and water polo. Upon his retirement from collegiate and international swimming, Steve became a leading innovator in competitive aquatic apparel founding TYR Sport in 1985.

=== Olympic schedule changes ===
Bruce and Steve share the distinction as the only known brothers to have held and broken one another's world records consecutively. In August 1975 at the United States Swimming National Championships, Bruce broke Steve's 200-meter individual medley world record in a race in which Steve also competed. In that same meet, Bruce and Steve, swimming for Long Beach Swim Club, shared the equally unique accomplishment, (along with teammates Tim Shaw and Rex Favaro), as the last swim club team to break a swimming relay world record (4×200-meter freestyle relay).

The decision by the International Olympic Committee and FINA to remove the 200-meter individual medley from the 1976 Summer Olympics robbed Bruce and Steve of the unique opportunity to compete against each other in an Olympic swimming event. Thus, Furniss's dream of winning a third, and, quite possibly, a fourth Olympic Gold Medal was thwarted when the 200-meter individual medley and the 4×100-meter freestyle relay (an event the United States had won in all three previous Olympics and both World Championships) were removed from the 1976 Summer Olympics competition schedule. As the reigning 200-meter individual medley world record-holder from 1975 through 1977, Furniss was the apparent favorite for the event's 1976 Olympic gold medal. At the time, Bruce, the event's existing world record holder, and Steve, the event's previous world record holder, were poised to race in the event against Great Britain's David Wilkie, who had previously shared the world record with brother Steve, and Canada's Graham Smith, who would break the world record in 1977.

Furniss was also the United States' fourth fastest swimmer in the 100-meter freestyle in 1975, and was a member of the world champion and world record-holding quartet (Furniss, Andy Coan, Jim Montgomery & John Murphy) in the 4×100-meter Freestyle Relay, an event the Americans were favored to win in 1976 and up unto that time, one the U.S. had never lost in Olympic competition. Ironically both events were permanently reinstated into the Olympic program eight years later at the 1984 Summer Olympics in Los Angeles, CA.

=== Long Beach Swim Club and Huntington Beach Aquatic Club ===
From December 1973 to the end of his career in August 1980, while swimming for Long Beach Swim Club (LBSC), Furniss's daily training partner was 1975 James E. Sullivan Award Winner, Tim Shaw. While at LBSC, Furniss was coached by two International Swimming Hall of Fame (ISHOF) coaches, Dick Jochums and Jon Urbanchek.

Prior to their 1973 arrival at Long Beach Swim Club, both Furniss Brothers were coached by another ISHOF inducted coach, Ralph "Flip" Darr, who coached noted Olympic medalist swimmers Gary Hall Sr. and siblings, Shirley and Jack Babashoff, while at Huntington Beach Aquatic Club.

== Awards and recognition ==
Furniss was twice named World Swimmer of the Year by Swimming World Magazine, once in 1975, and again in 1976. In 1974 and 1975, Furniss was awarded the prestigious Robert J. H. Kiphuth Award as the country's high point winner at the United States Swimming National Championships. He was inducted into the Orange County Sports Hall of Fame in 1984, as an "Honor Swimmer" in the ISHOF in 1987, and the University of Southern California Athletic Hall of Fame in 2001. Furniss also participated in carrying the Olympic flame as a participant of the 1984, 1996 and 2004 Olympic Torch Relays in the Los Angeles area.

In April 2000, Furniss was selected to "USA Swimming's Swim Team of the 20th Century", an honor bestowed on only 26 U.S. male swimmers deemed to be the best of the best in the 20th century. In January 2004, Furniss received the NCAA's Silver Anniversary Award. The award is presented annually to six former collegiate athletes in recognition of their 25 years of post-graduate career achievements, contributions to professional organizations, as well as charitable and civic activities within their community.

In February 2016, both Furniss brothers were selected to the Pac-12 Conference's All-Century Men's Swimming and Diving Team, recognizing them among the Conference's 32 best swimmers in the previous 100 years. In 2018, Furniss was cited as one of the top 100 swimmers of all-time in John Lohn's book, "The 100 Greatest Swimmers in History." Both Furniss brothers were inducted into the Long Beach, CA's Aquatic Capital of America Hall of Fame in 2019. Furniss was also one of four former collegiate athletes inducted into the College Sports Communicators Academic All-American Hall of Fame Class of 2020, one of only 170 Collegiate Academic All-Americans so recognized since its inception in 1988.

== Personal life ==
Furniss graduated in 1979 from USC's Annenberg School for Communication and Journalism with a bachelor's degree in journalism. Upon his retirement from swimming in 1980, Furniss worked in sports marketing and public relations and wrote for Swimming World Magazine. During this time he performed account work for Manning, Selvage & Lee and Burson-Marsteller. Most of his work involved supporting the marketing efforts of several major corporate sponsors of the 1984 Olympic Games in Los Angeles, CA. Since 1985, Furniss has been self-employed as a commercial real estate broker. He is a managing director with Berkadia in Irvine, CA. Furniss is married and resides in Villa Park, California. He is the father of three sons and a daughter, each of whom, like Furniss, attended USC.

Furniss is a part time Assistant Senior Coach at SoCal Aquatics in his original hometown of Tustin, CA.

Throughout much of his prime swimming career, Furniss became noted for achieving athletic success in spite of waging a quiet battle against the crippling arthritic disease, Ankylosing Spondylitis.

On May 1, 1980, Furniss had his childhood home burglarized. The only items stolen were his two Olympic medals, neither of which has surfaced, been returned, or located.

On March 29, 2020, while asleep at home, Furniss suffered a cardiac arrest. He was admitted to St. Joseph's Hospital in Orange, California, where he was treated with therapeutic hypothermia (medically induced cooling) and was eventually released.

== See also ==
- List of Olympic medalists in swimming (men)
- List of World Aquatics Championships medalists in swimming (men)
- List of University of Southern California people
- World record progression 200 metres freestyle
- World record progression 200 metres individual medley
- World record progression 4 × 100 metres freestyle relay
- World record progression 4 × 200 metres freestyle relay

Records
| Preceded by Tim Shaw | Men's 200-meter freestyle world record-holder (long course); June 18, 1975 – April 7, 1979 | Succeeded by Sergey Koplyakov |
| Preceded by David Wilkie; Steve Furniss | Men's 200-meter individual medley world record-holder (long course); August 23, 1975 – August 4, 1977 | Succeeded by Graham Smith |
| Preceded by United States | Men's 4 x 100-meter freestyle relay world record-holder (long course); July 25, 1975 - August 28, 1977 | Succeeded by United States |
| Preceded by United States | Men's 4 x 200-meter freestyle relay world record-holder (long course); August 25, 1975 - August 23, 1983 | Succeeded by West Germany |
