= Graeme Brewer =

Australian swimmer (born 1958)

Personal information
- Full name: Graeme Thomas Brewer
- National team: Australia
- Born: 1 December 1958 (age 67) New South Wales
- Height: 1.92 m (6 ft 4 in)
- Weight: 96 kg (212 lb)

Sport
- Sport: Swimming
- Strokes: Freestyle
- Club: Tamarana
Medal record
Men's swimming
Representing Australia
Olympic Games
Bronze medal – third place	1980 Moscow	200 m freestyle
Commonwealth Games
Gold medal – first place	1978 Edmonton	4x200 m freestyle
Gold medal – first place	1982 Brisbane	4x100 m freestyle
Gold medal – first place	1982 Brisbane	4x200 m freestyle
Silver medal – second place	1978 Edmonton	200 m freestyle
Silver medal – second place	1978 Edmonton	4x100 m freestyle
Bronze medal – third place	1978 Edmonton	4x100 m medley
Summer Universiade
Bronze medal – third place	1979 Mexico City	400 m freestyle

Graeme Thomas Brewer (born 1 December 1958) is an Australian former freestyle swimmer of the late 1970s and early 1980s who won a bronze medal in the 200-metre freestyle at the 1980 Summer Olympics. In all he won 13 Australian titles.

A native of New South Wales, Brewer attended Sydney Boys High School, graduating in 1976. He first gained attention in the surf lifesaving world when he won consecutive Australian junior ironman championships in 1976 and 1977, competing for the Tamarama club from Sydney's eastern suburbs. Switching to competition in the pool, Brewer gained prominence at Canada's 1978 Commonwealth Games in Edmonton, winning a silver medal in the 200-metre freestyle and one of each colour in the three relays.

In Moscow, Brewer claimed a bronze medal behind the Soviet Union pair of Sergey Kopliakov and Andrei Krylov. He came eighth in the 100-metre freestyle and seventh in the 4x200-metre freestyle relay along with Mark Tonelli, Mark Kerry and Neil Brooks. He narrowly missed the final of the 400-metre freestyle.

Brewer was best known for being a member of the so-called "Mean Machine" competing at the 1982 Commonwealth Games in Brisbane, when he combined with Neil Brooks, Greg Fasala and Michael Delany to claim gold in the 4x100-metre freestyle relay, gaining their nickname after collectively shaving their heads for the race. He also won a gold in the 4x200-metre freestyle relay. He competed at the 1984 Summer Olympics in the 4x200-metre freestyle relay, coming fourth.

== See also ==
- List of Commonwealth Games medallists in swimming (men)
- List of Olympic medalists in swimming (men)
