= Mike Bruner =

American swimmer (born 1956)

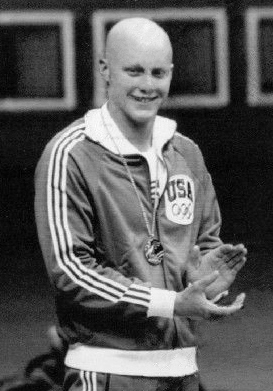
- Bruner at the 1976 Olympics

Personal information
- Full name: Michael Lee Bruner
- Nickname: "Mike" “Coach”
- National team: United States
- Born: July 23, 1956 (age 69) Omaha, Nebraska, U.S.
- Height: 5 ft 10 in (1.78 m)
- Weight: 161 lb (73 kg)
- Spouse: Melanie

Sport
- Sport: Swimming
- Strokes: Butterfly, freestyle
- Club: Pacific Athletic Club (PAC); DeAnza Swim Club
- College team: Stanford University
- Coach: Bill Rose (PAC, DeAnza); James Gaughran (Stanford)
Medal record
Representing the United States
Olympic Games
Gold medal – first place	1976 Montreal	200 m butterfly
Gold medal – first place	1976 Montreal	4×200 m freestyle
World Aquatics Championships
Gold medal – first place	1978 Berlin	200 m butterfly

Michael Lee Bruner (born July 23, 1956) is an American former competition swimmer, 1976 Montreal two-time Olympic champion, and former world record-holder in two events.

Born in Omaha, Nebraska on July 23, 1956, Bruner grew up in Stockton, California, and started swimming around age seven. At 12, he won two events at the San Joaquin Swimming and Diving Championships in July, 1968. By 14, he qualified for the American Athletic Union National Championships for the first time.

== High School era swimming ==
He attended and graduated from Stockton's Lincoln High School and represented their swim team at meets. By the summer of 1973, before his High School Senior year, he trained and competed with the Pacific Athletic Club, under Hall of Fame Head Coach Bill Rose, placing third in the 1500-meter freestyle at the Los Angeles Invitational Swim meet that August, with a time of 16:17.20, only seven seconds behind Rick DeMont's first place world record time of 16:05.17.

By his Junior year, Bruner was rated as a High School All American in the 200 and 400-yard freestyle events. By his Senior year at Stockton, Bruner recorded a time for the 1650-yard freestyle of 15:15.5, an American Record, and had a 500-yard freestyle time of 4:25.81. Both times were faster than the 1974 National Collegiate Athletic Association's (NCAA) winning times in those events, with his 1650-yard time a full ten seconds faster. As a top recruit, he signed a letter of intent for Stanford by May, 1974. Outstanding in distance freestyle events beyond 400-yards, by March 1974 of his High School Senior year, Bruner was rated fourth in the world in both the 500 and 800-yard freestyles.

After being accepted to Stanford University for the Fall of 1974, he began swimming with the De Anza Swim Club, currently a large program known as DeAnza Cupertino Aquatics (DACA), then under Head Coach Bill Rose, after a move to Cupertino.

== Stanford University ==
Bruner attended and swam for Stanford University, under Hall of Fame Head Coach James Gaughran, beginning in the Fall of 1974, and graduated in June 1979 with a degree in Mechanical Engineering. In one of his first college meets at the Stanford Invitational Championships on November 29, 1974, he broke the pool and school record for the 500-yard freestyle event with a time of 4:32.2. During his Stanford career, Bruner won two NCAA national championship titles with one in the 1650-yard freestyle, and one in the 200-yard butterfly.

== 1976 Olympic gold medals ==
In preparation for the 1976 Olympics, he left Stanford in the Spring semester and trained daily with Coach Bill Rose of the DeAnza Swim Club in Cuppertino, not far from his home in Stockton. At the June, 1976 Olympic trails at the Belmont Pool in Long Beach, Bruner qualified by placing fourth in the 200 freestyle with a 1:51.73, and finishing first in the 200 butterfly with a time of 2:00.03. In the 200 fly trial final, Bruner edged out second place Bill Forrester of Jacksonville by only .05 seconds.

At the 1976 Montreal Olympics he won a gold medal in the 4×200-meter freestyle relay swimming with Bruce Furniss, John Naber, and Jim Montgomery setting a World record of 7:23.22. He won another gold setting a second world record of 1:59.23, in the 200-meter butterfly. Though originally planning to pass German swimmer Roger Pytell at the end of the race, Bruner was second to Pytell by the 100-meter mark, and took the lead by the 150-meter mark.

Two years later, in another career high point, he won the 1978 World Championships in West Berlin in the 200 m butterfly.

Bruner performed well and was a high point scorer at the 1980 Olympic trials for the Moscow Olympics, qualifying first or second in three events, but was unable to compete due to the U.S. boycott of the games.

He held two American records, one in the 1650-yard freestyle, and one in the 200-yd butterfly. Primarily a freestyle distance specialist, Bruner captured seven AAU National championship titles in four events, the 400-meter, 1500-meter, 1650-yard freestyle, and 200-meter butterfly.

By 1980, Bruner served as a partner with MacFarlane Partners, an investment management firm that managed assets in real estate for pension plans. At the time, his wife Melanie and he were active in the Cupertino schools, where they and their three sons resided. In 2000, Bruner served as the Board President of the Bay Areas Sport Organizing Committee, a non-profit that supported sporting events in the San Francisco Bay area and was making a bid to host the 2012 U.S. Olympics.

=== Honors ===
Swimming World Magazine named Bruner its American swimmer of the year in 1980. In a highly distinctive honor, he was inducted into the International Swimming Hall of Fame as an "Honor Swimmer" in 1988. He was made a member of the Stanford University Athletic Hall of Fame in 1982, and was a J.H. Kiphuth Award recipient in 1980. The J.H. Kiphuth Award is the high-point award given at the United States' Swimming National Championships named in honor of 40-year Yale swim coach Robert John H. Kiphuth.

== See also ==
- List of Olympic medalists in swimming (men)
- List of Stanford University people
- List of World Aquatics Championships medalists in swimming (men)
- World record progression 200 metres butterfly
- World record progression 4 × 200 metres freestyle relay

Records
Preceded by Roger Pyttel	Men's 200-meter butterfly world record-holder (long course); July 18, 1976 – July 30, 1980	Succeeded by Craig Beardsley
