= Raskatov =

Raskatov (Russian: Раскатов) is a Russian masculine surname, its feminine counterpart is Raskatova. Notable people with the surname include:

- Alexander Raskatov (born 1953), Russian composer
- Volodymyr Raskatov (1957–2014), Ukrainian swimmer
