= RESS =

RESS or Ress may refer to:

- Rechargeable energy storage system, a power storage system
- Responsive Design + Server Side Components, a software architecture for Responsive web design that use components on the server not just on the client
- Rapid Expansion of Supercritical Solutions, a method used for micronization of substances
- Ress, a surname
