= Ress =

Ress is a surname. Notable people with this surname include:

- Colin Ress (born 1955), French swimmer
- Justin Ress (born 1997), American swimmer
- Kathrin Ress (born 1985), Italian basketball player
- Tomas Ress (born 1980), Italian basketball player
