= Jack Babashoff =

American swimmer (born 1955)

Personal information
- Full name: Jack Babashoff, Jr.
- National team: United States
- Born: July 13, 1955 (age 71) Whittier, California, U.S.
- Height: 6 ft 3 in (1.91 m)
- Weight: 185 lb (84 kg)

Sport
- Sport: Swimming
- Strokes: Freestyle
- Club: Long Beach Swim Club
- College team: University of Alabama
- Coach: Dick Jochums; Long Beach Swim Club; Don Gambril; U. of Alabama
Medal record
Men's swimming
Representing the United States
Olympic Games
Silver medal – second place	1976 Montreal	100 m freestyle
World Championships
Gold medal – first place	1978 Berlin	4×100 m freestyle
Pan American Games
Gold medal – first place	1975 Mexico City	4×100 m medley
Gold medal – first place	1975 Mexico City	4×100 m freestyle
Gold medal – first place	1979 San Juan	4×100 m freestyle
Silver medal – second place	1975 Mexico City	100 m freestyle

Jack Babashoff Jr. (born July 13, 1955) is an American former competition swimmer and a 1976 Olympic silver medal winner in the 100 meter freestyle.

Babashoff was born one of four children of Vera (Slevkoff), a former teacher, and Jack Babashoff Sr., a machinist. Both of his parents were second-generation Spiritual Christians from Russia. His younger sisters Shirley and Debbie and brother Bill were also swimmers who competed at the international level. Jack's father, Jack Sr., was a swimming instructor in Hawaii for a period while in the Army and hoped his own children might aspire to be Olympic swimmers.

== Early swim career ==
Babashoff began swimming in 1965 around the age of nine at the pool of Cerritos College, a Junior College in Norwalk, California, as did his sister Shirley Babashoff, who would also become an accomplished Olympian. In his early years, Jack swam for a number of clubs including the Buena Park Splashers. Around 13, Jack joined a team with sister Shirley in El Monte coached by Don La Mont, then after moving to the area around 1971 swam at Golden West College in Huntington Beach for a team called Phillips 66. He later swam for Long Beach Swim Club under Hall of Fame Coach Dick Jochums through around 1971-1978, where he settled. After entering High School, Jack would swim for both his clubs and High School, at times requiring more than one practice per day.

Babashoff attended and swam first for Lynwood High School and later when the family moved to Fountain Valley, he attended and swam for Fountain Valley High School in Fountain Valley, California, where he graduated. Recognized as a top California swimmer, Babashoff's High School swim times by his Senior Year were exceptional with personal bests of 46.8 seconds in the 100-yard freestyle, and a 1:42 in the 200-yard freestyle.

=== College swimming ===
He later swam for the University of Alabama where he was recruited and coached by Don Gambril a Swimming Hall of Fame inductee. Gambril also coached several American Olympic swimming teams, including Jack's 1976 team.

Babashoff completed what was then a personal best 100-meter time at California's Mission Viejo Invitational in August 1975. As a college junior, in the summer he continued to swim with the Long Beach Swim Club coached by Dick Jochums, who believed in shorter distance training at faster speeds. About a year prior to his junior year he left competitive swimming briefly for a year.

== 1975 Pan American Games medals ==
In the Pan American Games at Mexico City in 1975, Babashoff competed in one of his most successful meets and won three medals. He won a gold medal in the 4x100 meter freestyle relay, and a gold medal in the 4x100 meter medley relay. Continuing to improve his time, he took an individual silver medal, in the 100 meter freestyle, his signature event, with a time of 52.26.

In the 1979 Pan American games in San Juan, Puerto Rico, Babashoff won another gold medal with the American team in the 4 x 100 Meter freestyle relay.

== 1976 Olympic silver medal, 100 meters ==
Babashoff won a silver medal in a 100-meter freestyle at the 1976 Summer Olympics in Montreal, Quebec.

Babashoff's time was 50.81 seconds, less than a second behind American team member Jim Montgomery's gold medal-winning time of 49.99. Montgomery's time became the first 100-meter swim to break the 50 second mark. With one of the most impressive displays by any woman in an Olympics, Jack's sister Shirley won five medals for the American women that Olympic year, with one gold, and previously had won every event in the Olympic trials.

Jack was an alternate for the record setting 4x100 meter Medley relay team, which won a gold medal as well at Montreal, but he did not swim in the final heat, nor did he medal.

=== Record 4x100 free relay, East Berlin, 1977 ===
Babashoff led off the 4 x 100 American Team freestyle relay on August 28, 1977, in a dual meet against East Germany in East Berlin. The team included the 1976 Olympic 100 meter Gold medal winner Jim Montgomery who swam last.

(The American team's combined time was 3:21.11, which broke the standing world record by around 3.7 seconds.)

=== 1978 World Aquatics Gold Medal ===
In August 1978, he won a gold medal in the 4×100-meter freestyle relay at the 1978 World Aquatics Championships in West Berlin. The relay time was another World Record and broke the prior World Record set by an American team, by 2.6 seconds.

The 1976 Olympic 100-meter gold medalist Jim Montgomery swam on the team with Jack, and both had swum on the team that had set a prior World record in the event. The host team, West Germany, finished second, a considerable seven seconds behind the Americans, with the Swedish team a close third. After the win, the American team's legendary coach George Haines, said "We expected the victory and the new world record as well".

== See also ==
- List of Olympic medalists in swimming (men)
- List of World Aquatics Championships medalists in swimming (men)
- World record progression 4 × 100 metres freestyle relay
- World record progression 4 × 100 metres medley relay
