= Kozo Higuchi =

Japanese swimmer

Personal information
- Born: 23 April 1956 (age 70) Hiroshima, Japan

Sport
- Sport: Swimming
- Strokes: freestyle

Kozo Higuchi (樋口 浩三, Higuchi Kōzō; born 23 April 1956) is a Japanese former freestyle swimmer. He competed in the men's 100 metre freestyle at the 1976 Summer Olympics.
