= Bobby Patten =

American swimming coach

Biographical details
- Born: circa 1963; Littleton, Colorado, U.S.
- Education: Southern Methodist University

Playing career
- 1981-1985: Southern Methodist University
- Positions: butterfly, relay

Coaching career (HC unless noted)
- 1985-1990: Dallas Masters; Lone Star Masters
- 1990-1999: Baylor/Lone Star Masters
- 1999-2021: Dallas Aquatic Masters
- 2002-: Hockaday School; Varsity Head Coach
- 2020-: Pegasus Aquatics Masters; Director, Swim Training; Dallas

Accomplishments and honors

Awards
- 2010 USMS Coach of the Year

Bobby Patten (born c. 1963) is an American swimming coach who was a 2010 recipient of United States Masters Swimming's Coach of the Year. He was a competitive swimmer for Southern Methodist University where he was a five-time NCAA All-American specializing in butterfly. Since his college swimming career, he has won several open water competitions and as a U.S. Masters Swimmer has set numerous age group records in freestyle and butterfly events.

== Early swimming ==
At the age of six, Patten began swimming competitively at the downtown Denver Athletic Club, under Coach Gene Mack, and later swam for the Denver University Hilltoppers Club under Coach Steve Hadley. Patten was ranked second nationally in the 100 Meter butterfly at age ten, in a time that was a Colorado State record. At 14, Patten set the National age group record in the 200-yard butterfly.

=== Club swimming ===
When the DU Hilltoppers, a competitive year-round club, moved to the Englewood High School Pool, Patten moved with the team, and began swimming for Coach Mike Doane. When DU Hilltopers Coach Mike Doane left the Hilltoppers, Patten qualified for Senior Nationals under the coaching of Jimmy Railey, and Eric Craven. In Patton's meet records, the club was sometimes referenced as the Englewood Athletic Club.

=== High School swimming ===
Patten swam for coach Stringy Ervin at Littelton High School in the Denver area. In one of his signature events, he was a High School Denver state champion in the 100 butterfly in 1979, 1980, and 1981. He was a High School All American in the three years he competed for Litteton, where he helped to lead the team to three State Championships.

In July and August 1980, Patten swam in the Olympic trial preliminarys in Irvine, California for the 100 and 200-meter Butterfly, though the American team had boycotted the Games and did not participate. In a highly competitive year, Patton did not make the finals, though his times were well within range of qualifying for the trials.

=== College swimming for SMU ===
Patten received a scholarship to swim for Southern Methodist University under Coach George McMillion. As an SMU swimmer, Patten received NCAA All American honors five times, and represented America at the 1982 World Championships with three other Colorado swimmers. While at SMU, Patten swam butterfly for an NCAA Championship Medley relay in 1983, which set the US Open and American record. The record was made possible by a 51 second breaststroke leg swum by Olympian Steve Lundquist.

In the summer before his junior year at SMU, Patten had successful surgery at the UCLA medical center to remove a cancerous tumor from his right arm.

=== '84, '88 Olympic trials ===
In 1984, Patten swam in the Olympic Trials in Indianapolis, placing thirteenth in the Men's 200 Butterfly with a 2:02.77 in the finals, less than 3 seconds behind the first place qualifier, former world record holder Craig Beardsley, but not sufficient to make the finals round. Continuing to compete at a high level, Patten was 26th in the 1988 Olympic Trials in Austin, Texas, in the 100-meter butterfly, and did not qualify, though with the large field, his preliminary time was only around 2 seconds behind first place finisher Matt Biondi.

Continuing to swim competitively after college, Patten swam for the U.S. team at the 1987 Pan Pacific Swimming Championships. He placed third in the 200-meter butterfly qualifying round, but did not medal in international competition. His qualifying time of 2:00.45 was within 2 seconds of the American Pan Pacific 200-meter butterfly gold medal winner, Melvin Stewart.

=== Open water and Master's swimming ===
An open water swimmer, Patten has placed first in the 1991 Waikiki Roughwater Swim, San Francisco's 1-mile Alcatraz Sharkfest Swim, and the Open Water 5-mile National Championship Swim at Lake Minnetonka. Continuing to swim as a United States Master's swimmer, between 1990-2004, Patton set national age group records, primarily in the 400, 800, 1500, and 1650 freestyle and his signature event, the 200 butterfly.

== Coaching swimming ==
=== Dallas Master's teams ===
After an active NCAA swimming career, and while still in college at SMU, Patten began working as a coach with the Dallas Masters swim program beginning around 1984. The club was founded by 1976 Olympian Jim Montgomery in 1981. The Club name was soon changed to Lone Star Masters.

=== Baylor/Lone Star Masters ===
Around 1990, Lone Star Masters Coach and founder Jim Montgomery began serving as an Aquatics Director at Baylor's Tom Landry Center, and had earlier taken part in designing their eight-lane Olympic 25-meter pool. To reflect the role the Baylor Landry Center would play as a Dallas Masters practice location, around 1990 the Club's name officially became Baylor/Lone Star Masters, where Patten continued as a primary coach, with additional administrative responsibilities.

=== Dallas Aquatic Masters ===
Renaming the Baylor/Lone Star Masters team, Patten was a co-founder of the Dallas Aquatic Masters club team around 1999 with partner and co-founder Jim Montgomery. Patten had both management and coaching responsibilities. Dallas's Southern Methodist University and Baylor's Tom Landry Center remained two of the larger Dallas area pools where practices were held, as well as Richardson's Pierce High School.

Beginning in 2002, Patten began serving as Varsity Head Swimming Coach for the Hockaday School in Dallas for the winter season, taking place between November and February, and as of 2023 is still coaching there.

=== Pegasus Aquatics Masters ===
Around 2020, Patten began coaching with Dallas's Pegasus Aquatics Masters Swim Program and is currently Director of Swim Training where he coaches, schedules practices, manages programs, and directs competitions. As the Pegasus Program has grown, he has moved out of coaching and into a role in management. The swim program holds practices at the newly built Southern Methodist University indoor pool, but has also had facilities at Dallas's Highland Park High School pool, Garland ISD Pool, and the Oak Point Recreation Center.

=== Honors ===
In 2010, Patten was made the United States Masters Swimming Coach of the Year.
