= Karim Ressang =

Dutch swimmer (born 1955)

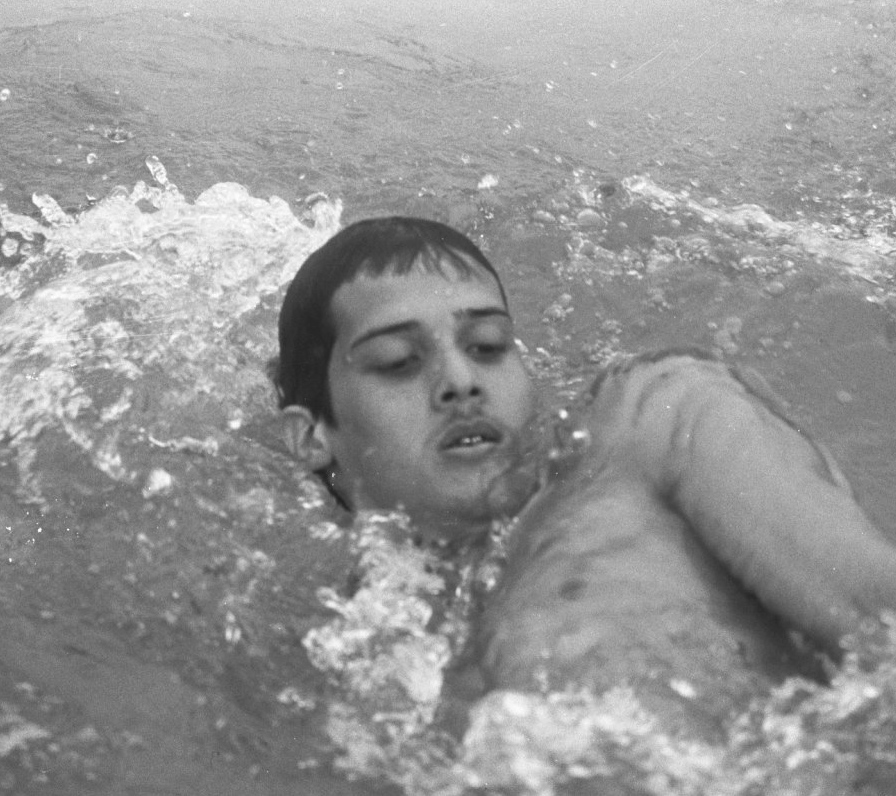
- Karim Ressang in 1973

Personal information
- Born: 15 November 1955 (age 70) Utrecht, Netherlands

Sport
- Sport: Swimming
- Strokes: Freestyle, backstroke
- Club: California Golden Bears, Berkeley (USA); HPC, Heemstede

Abdul Karim Ressang (born 15 November 1955) is a former freestyle swimmer from the Netherlands. He competed at the 1976 Summer Olympics in the 200 m backstroke and 4 × 200 m freestyle relay and finished in sixth place in the relay.

He won a national title in the 100 m freestyle in 1975 and set about 15 national records in backstroke, freestyle and medley events between 1974 and 1976.
