= Alan McClatchey =

Scottish swimmer (born 1956)

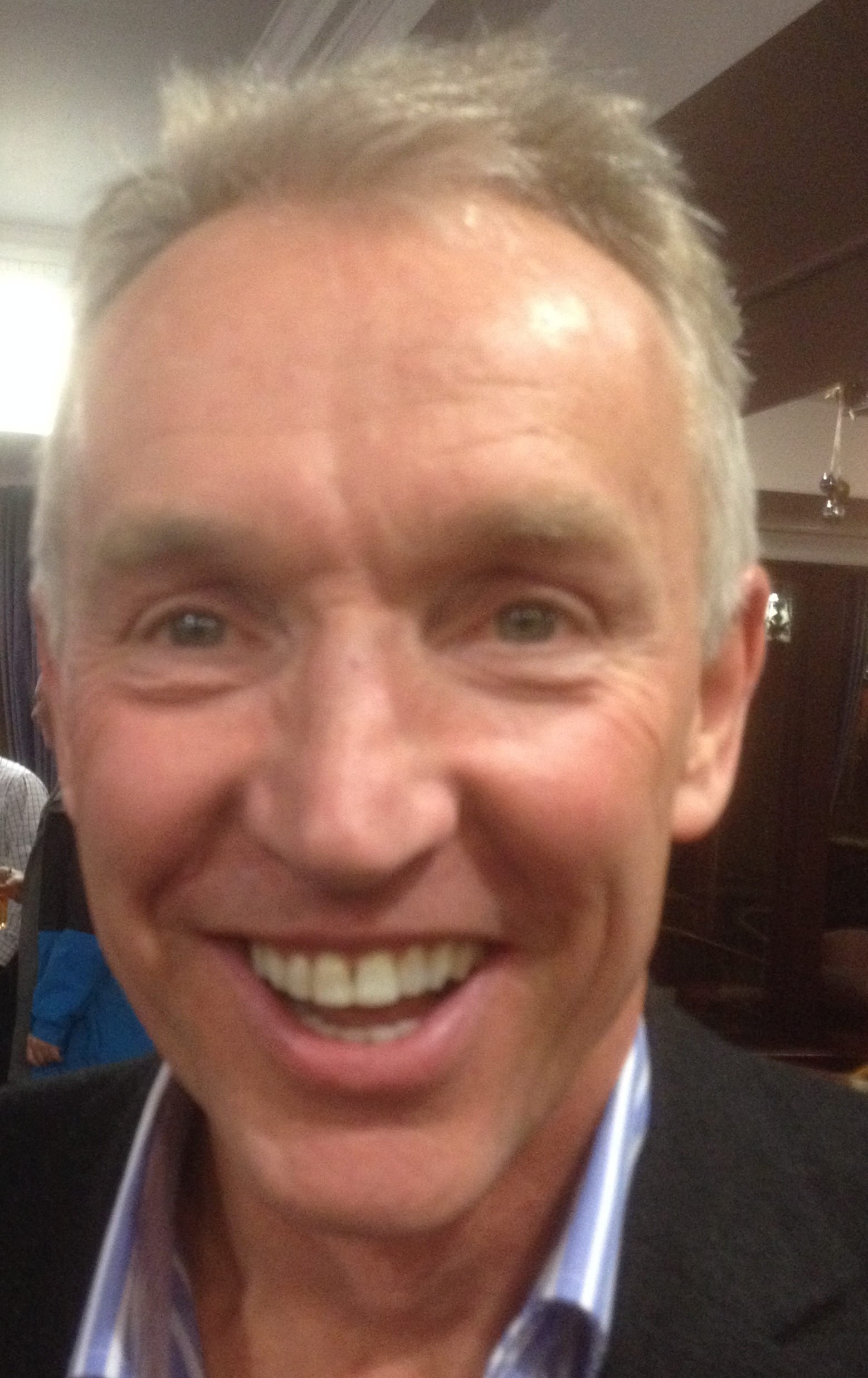
- McClatchey in 2013

Personal information
- Full name: Alan McClatchey
- National team: Great Britain
- Born: 16 September 1956 (age 70)

Sport
- Sport: Swimming
- Strokes: Freestyle, butterfly, medley
- Club: Warrender Baths Club
- College team: University of Michigan
Medal record
Men's swimming
Representing Great Britain
Olympic Games
Bronze medal – third place	1976 Montreal	4x200 m freestyle
World Swimming Championships
Silver medal – second place	1975 Cali	4x200 m freestyle

Alan McClatchey (born 16 September 1956) is a Scottish former swimmer who competed at the 1976 Summer Olympics in Montreal, Quebec, Canada, and won a bronze medal as a member of the British 4x200-metre freestyle relay with Gordon Downie, David Dunne and Brian Brinkley. He swam for Warrender Baths Club in Edinburgh, Scotland. He also swam for the University of Michigan's intercollegiate team while studying there.

== Sporting career ==
McClatchey represented Scotland in the 1974 British Commonwealth Games in Auckland, New Zealand. In 1975 he swam for Scotland at the Three-nations tournament in Prague, Czechoslovakia and at the eight-nations swimming tournament in Mallorca, Spain. He won a silver medal at the 1975 World Championships in Cali, Colombia as part of the British 4 × 200 m freestyle relay with Gordon Downie, Brian Brinkley and Gary Jameson In 1976, apart from winning a bronze medal at the Olympics, he broke the British records for the 400 m freestyle, the 200 m butterfly and the 400 m individual medley, the latter while swimming for Great Britain at the Europa Cup in Italy. He also swam for Britain in the 1977 European Aquatics Championships in Jönköping, Sweden, won seven Scottish and seven British championships that year and represented Scotland at the annual eight-nations match. He represented Scotland at the 1978 Commonwealth Games in Edmonton, Alberta, Canada and at a four-nations match in the Netherlands the same year. McClatchey again represented Scotland at the eight-nations tournament in 1979, broke the Scottish record for the 100 yards butterfly and swam in the 1979 Summer Universiade (World University Games) in Mexico. In 1980 McClatchey swam for Scotland in the eight-nations match (at the Royal Commonwealth Pool in Edinburgh) for the last time and also represented Scotland at an international match in Bremen, Germany.

At the ASA National British Championships he won the 200 metres freestyle title in 1976 and was twice winner of the 400 metres freestyle in 1975 and 1976. He also won the 200 metres butterfly title in 1975 and was a three times winner of the 400 metres medley title in 1975, 1976 and 1977.

== Personal life ==
McClatchey graduated in medicine and pathology from the University of Edinburgh and in 1973 was a general practitioner in Bristol, England. In 2014 McClatchey was inducted into the Scottish Swimming Hall of Fame. In 2019 he was introduced to Wood Trained Swimmers Club in Bristol. He has three children: 2 sons and 1 daughter.

McClatchey's niece, Caitlin McClatchey, won two gold medals at the 2006 Commonwealth Games.

== See also ==
- List of Olympic medalists in swimming (men)
- List of University of Michigan alumni
