= Bent Brask =

Norwegian swimmer

Personal information
- Born: 30 March 1958 (age 68) Drøbak, Norway

Sport
- Sport: Swimming

Bent Brask (born 30 March 1958) is a Norwegian former swimmer. He competed in the men's 4 × 200 metre freestyle relay at the 1976 Summer Olympics.
