= Benoît Laffineur =

French swimmer (born 1957)

Personal information
- Nationality: French
- Born: 30 October 1957 (age 68)

Sport
- Sport: Swimming

Benoît Laffineur (born 30 October 1957) is a French former swimmer. He competed in the men's 4 × 200 metre freestyle relay at the 1976 Summer Olympics.
