= Sergey Koplyakov =

Russian-Belarusian swimmer (born 1959)

Medal record

Men's swimming

Representing the Soviet Union

Olympic Games
Gold medal – first place	1980 Moscow	200 m freestyle
Gold medal – first place	1980 Moscow	4×200 m freestyle
Silver medal – second place	1976 Montreal	4×200 m freestyle
Silver medal – second place	1980 Moscow	4×100 m medley

World Championships (LC)
Silver medal – second place	1978 Berlin	4×200 m freestyle
Bronze medal – third place	1978 Berlin	200 m freestyle

European Championships
Gold medal – first place	1977 Jönköping	4×200 m freestyle
Gold medal – first place	1981 Split	200 m freestyle
Gold medal – first place	1981 Split	4×100 m freestyle
Gold medal – first place	1981 Split	4×200 m freestyle
Bronze medal – third place	1977 Jönköping	4×100 m freestyle

Sergey Viktorovich Koplyakov (Russian: Сергей Викторович Копляков; born 23 January 1959) is a Russian-Belarusian swimmer who won two gold medals competing for the Soviet Union at the 1980 Summer Olympics.

Sergey Koplyakov moved into top ranks of world swimming in 1979, coming behind Vladimir Salnikov, Andrey Krylov and Volodymyr Raskatov, enabling the Soviet Union to fully compete in male freestyle with American champions in the late 1970s. In sports history, Koplyakov will be the swimmer who ended 15 years of American domination in the 200 m freestyle and the first man who bested the time of 1:50 (on 7 April 1979 he achieved 1:49.83 in East Berlin).

Born in Orsha, Belarus' 11th-largest city, Koplyakov debuted in 1974, at the age of 15. He won the 200 m juniors in a people's tournament in 1969. From Minsk he went to Leningrad, one of the pilot centers of the new Soviet swimming and was selected in 1976 for the Montreal Olympic Games, where he won a silver medal in the 4×200 m. His best time in 200 m that year was 1:53.37. In 1977 he was very discreet, only got a fifth place in the 200 m of the European Championships. In 1978, in the West Berlin World Championships, he finished third in the 200 m, behind two Americans with a time of 1:51.33 (new European record). He achieved high recognition in 1978, beating on 7 April the 200 m world record, during the first split of one 4×200 m relay in a GDR/USSR meeting; after that he won the 100 m in 51.46 and the 200 m of the Europe Cup (London) in August and finally the 200 m of the Spartakiad in Moscow in September with 1:50.13, showing himself as one of the most serious opponents for the American swimmers.

== See also ==
- World record progression 200 metres freestyle
