= Andrey Bogdanov (swimmer) =

Soviet swimmer

Personal information
- Born: June 8, 1958
- Died: July 2, 1999 (aged 41)

Sport
- Sport: Swimming
Medal record
Representing the Soviet Union
Olympic Games
Silver medal – second place	1976 Montreal	4x200 m freestyle relay

Andrey Bogdanov (8 June 1958 – 2 July 1999) was a Russian swimmer who competed in the 1976 Summer Olympics.
