= Nikolay Ganev =

Bulgarian swimmer (born 1955)

Personal information
- Born: 6 February 1955 (age 71)

Sport
- Sport: Swimming

Nikolay Ganev (Bulgarian: Николай Ганев; born 6 February 1955) is a Bulgarian former swimmer. He competed in two events at the 1976 Summer Olympics.
