= Volodymyr Raskatov =

Ukrainian swimmer

Personal information
- Born: October 23, 1957 Zaporizhzhia, Ukrainian SSR, Soviet Union
- Died: January 11, 2014 (aged 56) Chișinău, Moldova

Sport
- Sport: Swimming
Medal record
Representing the Soviet Union
Olympic Games
Silver medal – second place	1976 Montreal	4x200 m freestyle relay
Bronze medal – third place	1976 Montreal	400 m freestyle
European Championships
Gold medal – first place	1977 Jönköping	4x200m freestyle relay

Volodymyr Serhiyovych Raskatov (Ukrainian: Володимир Сергійович Раскатов; 23 October 1957– 11 January 2014) was a Soviet and Ukrainian freestyle swimmer who competed in the 1976 Summer Olympics.
