= Eduardo Pérez (swimmer) =

Mexican swimmer (born 1957)

Personal information
- Full name: Eduardo Pérez
- Nickname: Lalo
- Nationality: Mexican
- Born: March 6, 1957 (age 69) Florida

Sport
- Sport: Swimming
- Strokes: Freestyle
Medal record
Men's swimming
Representing Mexico
Pan American Games
Bronze medal – third place	1975 Mexico City	4x100m freestyle

Eduardo Pérez (born 6 March 1957) is a Mexican former freestyle swimmer who competed in the 1976 Summer Olympics.
