= Steven Newkirk =

American swimmer (born 1957)

Personal information
- Born: December 12, 1957 (age 68)

Sport
- Sport: Swimming

Steven Newkirk (born December 21, 1957) is a former swimmer. He competed in four events at the 1976 Summer Olympics representing the United States Virgin Islands.
