= René van der Kuil =

Dutch swimmer

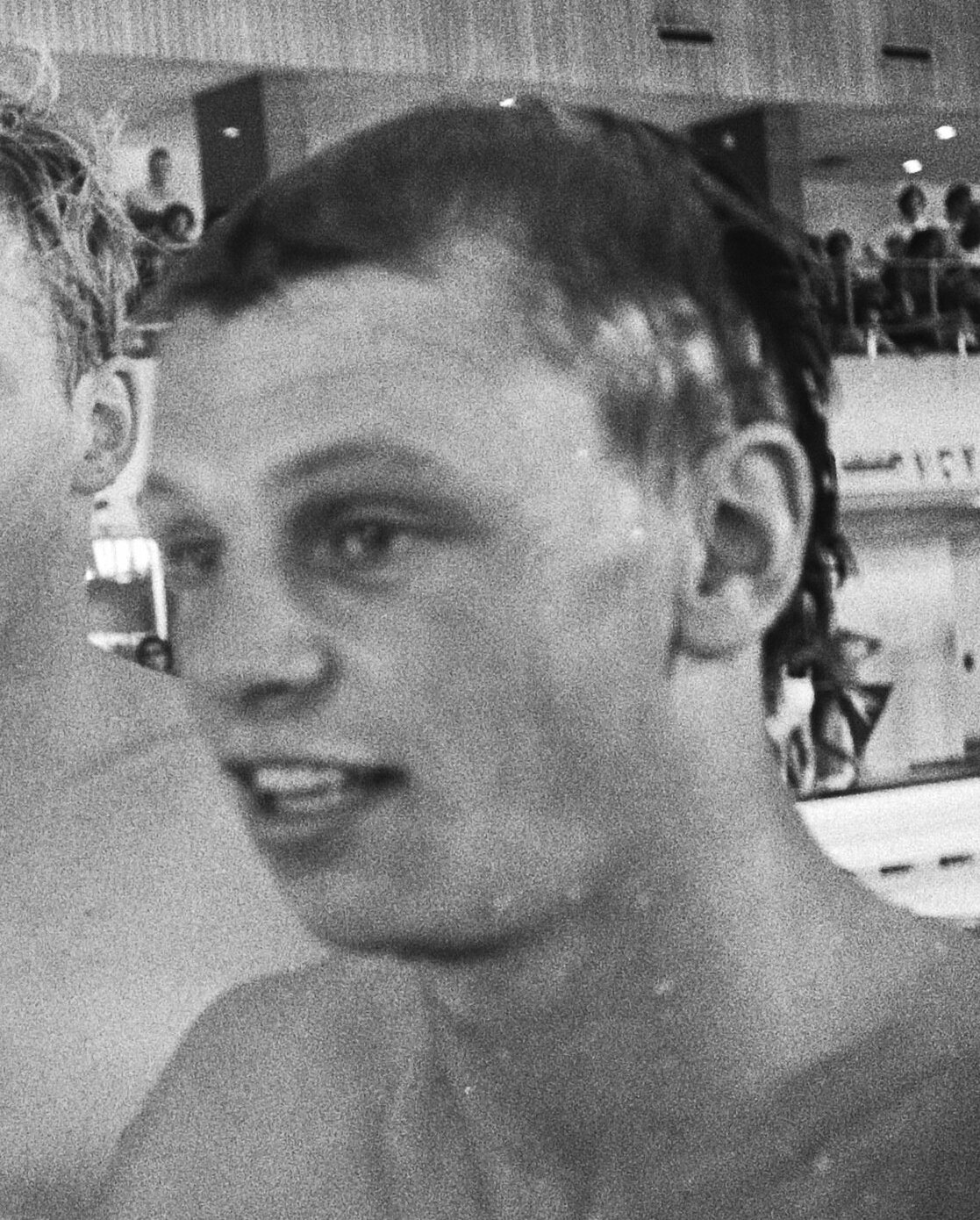
- René van der Kuilin 1976

Personal information
- Born: 3 June 1956 (age 70) Schiedam, Netherlands

Sport
- Sport: Swimming
- Strokes: Freestyle
- Club: SZC, Schiedam

René van der Kuil (born 3 June 1956) is a former freestyle swimmer from the Netherlands. He competed at the 1976 Summer Olympics in the 200 m, 400 m and 4 × 200 m freestyle relay events and finished in sixth place in the relay.
