= Luis Goicoechea =

Venezuelan swimmer (born 1956)

Personal information
- Born: 26 November 1956 (age 69)

Sport
- Sport: Swimming

Luis Goicoechea (born 26 November 1956) is a Venezuelan former swimmer. He competed in four events at the 1976 Summer Olympics.
