= Mark Crocker =

Hong Kong swimmer (born 1956)

Personal information
- Nationality: Hong Kong
- Born: 26 May 1956 (age 70) Haverfordwest, Pembrokeshire, Wales

Sport
- Sport: Swimming
- Club: Harry Wright
- College team: Alabama

Mark Anthony Crocker (born 26 May 1956) is a Hong Kong former freestyle and backstroke swimmer. He competed at the 1972 Summer Olympics and the 1976 Summer Olympics. Educated at Island School, he trained at the Harry Wright swim club. He then enrolled at the University of Alabama.
