= André in het Veld =

Dutch swimmer (born 1958)

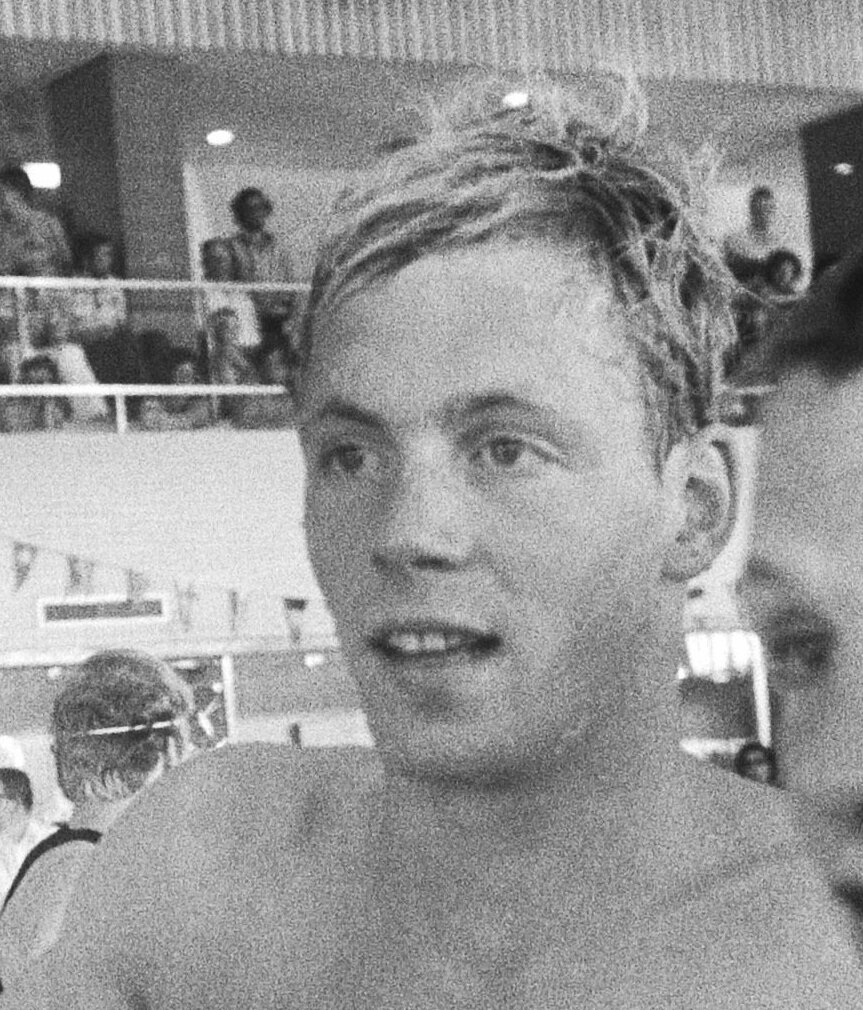
- André in het Veld in 1976

Personal information
- Born: 6 March 1958 (age 68) Loughlinstown, Ireland

Sport
- Sport: Swimming
- Strokes: Freestyle
- Club: ZPA, Almelo

André in het Veld (born 6 March 1958) is a former freestyle swimmer from the Netherlands. He competed at the 1976 Summer Olympics in the 200 m and 4 × 200 m freestyle relay events and finished in sixth place in the relay.

He won two national titles, in the 100 m freestyle in 1976 and in the 100 m butterfly in 1977. Between 1976 and 1977 he set six national records in 100 m and 200 m freestyle and butterfly, mostly in the 25 m pool.
