= James Hett =

Canadian swimmer

Personal information
- Born: 13 April 1958 (age 68) Kitchener, Ontario, Canada

Sport
- Sport: Swimming

James Hett (born 13 April 1958) is a Canadian former swimmer. He competed in two events at the 1976 Summer Olympics.
