= Colin Ress =

French swimmer (born 1955)

Personal information
- Born: 28 November 1955 (age 70)

Sport
- Sport: Swimming

Colin Ress (born 28 November 1955) is a French former swimmer. He competed in the men's 4 × 200 metre freestyle relay at the 1976 Summer Olympics.
