= Peter Pettersson =

Swedish swimmer

Personal information
- Born: 29 December 1957 Järfälla, Sweden

Sport
- Sport: Swimming
- Club: SK Laxen
Medal record
Men's swimming
Representing Sweden
European Championships
| Bronze medal – third place | 1974 Vienna | 4×200 m freestyle |

Björn Peter Pettersson (born 29 December 1957) is a retired Swedish swimmer who won a bronze medal in the 4 × 200 m freestyle relay at the 1974 European Aquatics Championships. Two years later at the 1976 Summer Olympics he finished seventh with the Swedish team in the same event.
