= Toni Statelov =

Bulgarian swimmer

Personal information
- Born: 15 February 1950 (age 76) varna

Sport
- Sport: Swimming

Toni Statelov (Bulgarian: Тони Стателов, born 15 January 1950) is a Bulgarian former swimmer. He competed in the men's 4 × 200 metre freestyle relay at the 1976 Summer Olympics.
