= René Écuyer =

French swimmer (born 1956)

Personal information
- Born: 4 September 1956 (age 69)

Sport
- Sport: Swimming

René Écuyer (born 4 September 1956) is a French former freestyle swimmer. He competed at the 1976 Summer Olympics and the 1980 Summer Olympics.
