= Fabien Noël =

French swimmer

Personal information
- Born: 5 January 1959 (age 67)

Sport
- Sport: Swimming

Fabien Noël (born 5 January 1959) is a French former freestyle swimmer. He competed at the 1976 Summer Olympics and the 1980 Summer Olympics.
