= Petar Georgiev (swimmer) =

Bulgarian swimmer

Personal information
- Born: 7 May 1959 (age 67)

Sport
- Sport: Swimming

Petar Georgiev (Bulgarian: Петър Георгиев, born 7 May 1959) is a Bulgarian former swimmer. He competed in two events at the 1976 Summer Olympics.
