= Guillermo Pacheco (swimmer) =

Peruvian swimmer

Personal information
- Full name: Guillermo Rafael Pacheco Urdaneta
- Born: 23 December 1954 (age 71)

Sport
- Sport: Swimming

Guillermo Rafael Pacheco Urdaneta (born 23 December 1954) is a Peruvian former freestyle swimmer. He competed in two events at the 1972 Summer Olympics.
