= Gordon Downie (swimmer) =

British swimmer in 1976 Summer Olympics

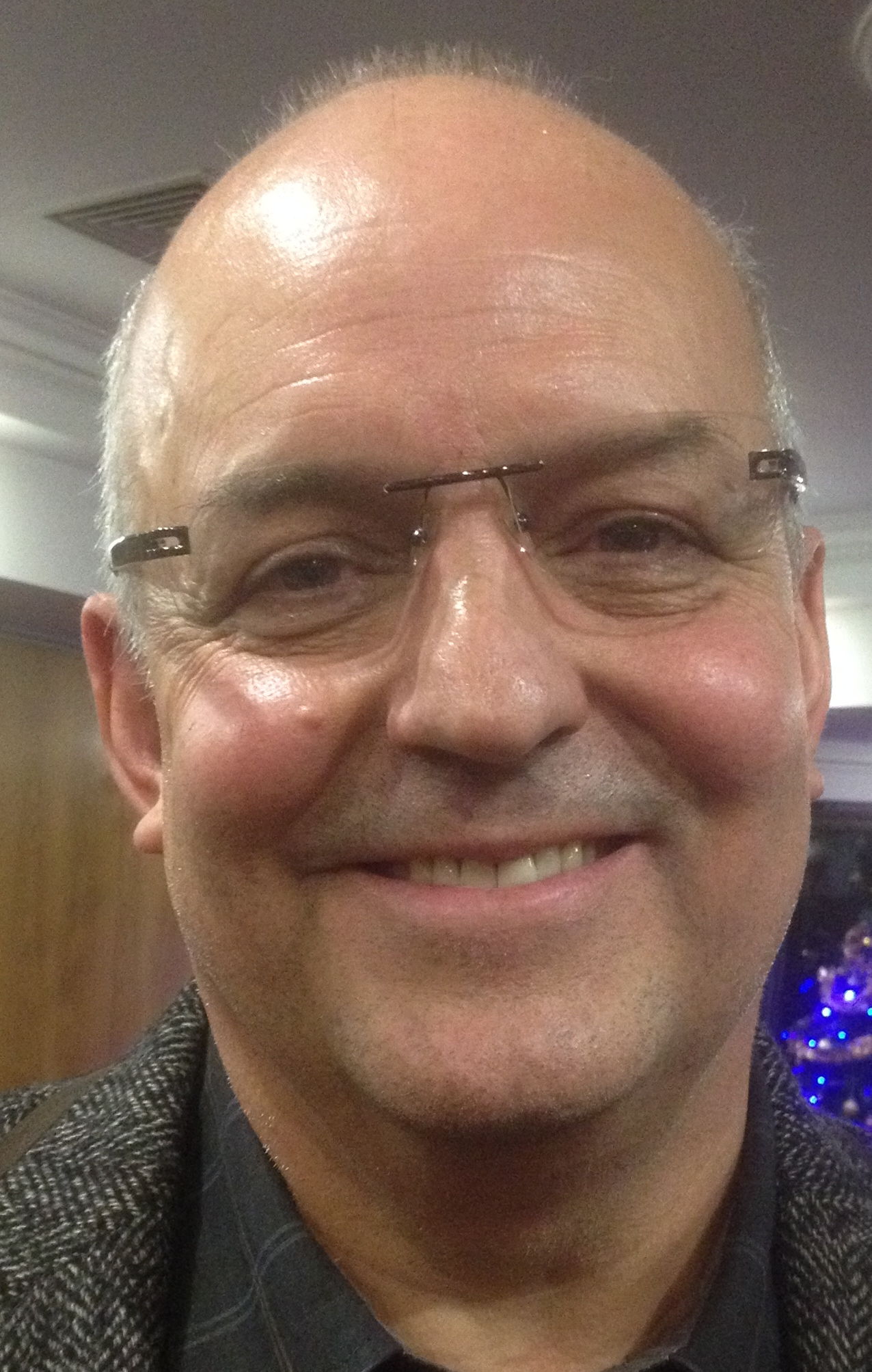

Personal information
- Full name: Gordon Hunter Downie
- National team: (United Kingdom) Great Britain; Scotland
- Born: 3 March 1955 (age 71) Wisconsin, United States
- Height: 1.96 m (6 ft 5 in)
- Weight: 91 kg (201 lb)

Sport
- Sport: Swimming
- Strokes: Freestyle
- Club: Warrender Baths Club
- College team: University of Michigan
Medal record
Men's swimming
Representing Great Britain
Olympic Games
Bronze medal – third place	1976 Montreal	4x200 m freestyle
World Swimming Championships
Silver medal – second place	1975 Cali	4x200 m freestyle
Bronze medal – third place	1975 Cali	4x100 m medley

Gordon Hunter Downie (born 3 March 1955) is a British former competitive swimmer who swam in the 1976 Summer Olympics and won a bronze medal as a member of the British 4x200-metre freestyle relay team.

== Biography ==
=== Swimming career ===
Although Downie was born in the U.S. state of Wisconsin, his father was Scottish and he swam for Great Britain, Scotland, and the Warrender Baths Club in Edinburgh. While attending the University of Michigan on an athletics scholarship, he swam for the Michigan Wolverines swimming and diving team in collegiate competition.

Downie represented Great Britain at the 1973 World Aquatics Championships in Belgrade, Yugoslavia where he broke the Scottish record for the 200-metre freestyle. The next year he represented Scotland at the 1974 British Commonwealth Games in Christchurch, New Zealand. In 1975 he swam for Scotland at the 8-nations tournament in Prague, Czechoslovakia. and won a silver medal at the 1975 World Championships in Cali, Colombia as part of the British 4x200-metre freestyle relay with Alan McClatchey, Gary Jameson, and Brian Brinkley. At the same championships he won a bronze medal as part of the British 4x100-metre medley relay with David Wilkie, James Carter and Brian Brinkley. Apart from winning his bronze medal, he was sixth in the 200-metre freestyle at the 1976 Montreal Olympics when he set a British record that stood for six years. He swam in the 1977 European Aquatics Championships in Jönköping, Sweden, and represented Scotland in the 1978 Commonwealth Games in Edmonton, Alberta, Canada. Downie held both the Scottish 200-metre and 400-metre freestyle records for 10 years from 1972 to 1982.

He won the 1975 ASA National Championship 100 metres freestyle title, the 1979 200 metres freestyle and the 400 metres freestyle in 1977.

Downie was inducted into the Scottish Swimming Hall of Fame in 2014.

=== Personal life ===
Downie graduated with a medical degree from Northwestern University in 1986. In 2004 Downie was a doctor (pulmonologist) at The Brody School of Medicine at East Carolina University and in 2014 he was practicing in Mount Pleasant, Texas at the Titus Regional Medical Center. He specialises in lung cancer clinical and research work.

== See also ==
- List of Olympic medalists in swimming (men)
- List of University of Michigan alumni
