= Andy Coan =

American swimmer (1958–2017)

Medal record

Representing United States

Men's Swimming

World Aquatics Championships
| Gold medal – first place | 1975 Cali | 100 m freestyle |
| Gold medal – first place | 1975 Cali | 4 × 100 m freestyle relay |
| Gold medal – first place | 1975 Cali | 4 × 100 m medley relay |

Summer Universiade
| Gold medal – first place | 1977 Sofia | 4×100 m freestyle |
| Silver medal – second place | 1977 Sofia | 100 m freestyle |

Andrew B. Coan (March 4, 1958 – March 20, 2017) was an American freestyle swimmer.

== Biography ==
In 1975, at 17 years of age, while representing Pine Crest High School at an Amateur Athletic Union swimming meet, Coan broke Jim Montgomery's 12-day-old 100 metre freestyle world record.

Later that year, under the coaching of Jack Nelson, Coan won three gold medals at the 1975 FINA World Championships in Cali, Colombia. He won two as part of the United States 4 x 100 metre freestyle and 4 x 100 metre medley relay teams and won the third in the 100 metre individual freestyle event.

He continued his winning run at the 1975 United States National Swimming Championships, where he won a gold medal in the 100 yards freestyle event.

After graduating from Pine Crest in 1976, Coan attended the University of Tennessee on a swimming scholarship. Here, his dominance in freestyle swimming continued, as he won seven NCAA National Championships, winning the 50 and the 100 freestyle twice. He was also a member of four University of Tennessee 4 x 100 freestyle relay NCAA Championship teams, and won the 200 freestyle. Coan broke four American records while at University of Tennessee - the 50, 100, 200 and the 4x50 freestyle relay. In 1978, his sophomore year, he led the Tennessee Volunteers to the NCAA Championship and was named the university's Athlete of the Year. Coan later coached Pine Crest high school's rival team, Saint Andrews of Boca Raton working with Coach Sid Cassidy.

Coan did not participate in the 1980 Summer Olympics due to the boycott by United States to protest the Soviet invasion of Afghanistan.

Coan was inducted into Pine Crest High School's Athletic Hall of Fame.

Current athlete nephews of Andy are Matthew and Kyle Coan, both raised in Fort Lauderdale and coached by Jack Nelson while combining for 8 state championships while attending the Saint Thomas Aquinas High School. After upper school each respectively received athletic scholarship offers to attend the University of Florida receiving Letterman awards while training for distance freestyles.

Coan was temporarily paralyzed by Guillain–Barré syndrome in 2014–2015, and died from liver cancer on March 20, 2017, in Boca Raton, Florida.

== See also ==
- List of University of Tennessee people
- List of World Aquatics Championships medalists in swimming (men)
- World record progression 100 metres freestyle
- World record progression 4 × 100 metres freestyle relay

Records
| Preceded by Jim Montgomery | Men's 100 metre freestyle world record holder (long course); August 3, 1975 – August 23, 1975 | Succeeded by Jim Montgomery |
