= Stefan Georgiev (swimmer) =

Bulgarian swimmer

Personal information
- Born: 28 July 1955 (age 70) Plovdiv, Bulgaria

Sport
- Sport: Swimming

Stefan Georgiev (born 28 July 1955) is a Bulgarian former swimmer. He competed in two events at the 1976 Summer Olympics.
