= Paulo Frischknecht =

Portuguese swimmer

Paulo Frischknecht OLY
Personal information
- Born: 7 June 1961 (age 65) Tomar, Portugal

Sport
- Sport: Swimming

Paulo Frischknecht (born 7 June 1961) is a Portuguese former freestyle and butterfly swimmer. He competed at the 1976 Summer Olympics and the 1980 Summer Olympics.
