= José Pereira (swimmer) =

Portuguese swimmer

José Gomes-Pereira
Personal information
- Born: 9 May 1955 (age 71)

Sport
- Sport: Swimming

José Henrique Fuentes Gomes Pereira (born 9 May 1955) is a physician and former competitive swimmer who represented Portugal in the 1976 Olympic Games, European Championships (Vienna, 1974; Jönköping, Sweden, 1977), and World Championships (Berlin, 1978). He was considered one of the best Portuguese athletes of his generation. Throughout his sports career, he set over a hundred national records. He is a physician (Order of Physicians), a European specialist in Sports Medicine, and a full Professor at the School of Human Kinetics of the University of Lisbon. As a doctor, he is one of the most reputable Portuguese specialists in Sports Medicine. He has served as a physician for various sports federations and for athletes who have won medals in European and world championships, as well as the Olympic Games. He was the Clinical Director of the National Football Teams (1990–1993) - Portuguese Football Federation, Olympic Physician at the Atlanta 1996 Summer Olympic Games, and the Clinical Director of Sporting Clube de Portugal (2000–2011). He served as the Clinical Director of the Portuguese Olympic Committee for the 2016–2020 Olympiad and was responsible for the medical mission to the 2020 Tokyo Olympic Games, and indicated for the same functions in the Olympics 2024 in Paris. He is a Fellow and Professional Member of the European College of Sport Science, the American College of Sports Medicine, and other national and international scientific and professional societies. He is a regular speaker at national and international conferences, the co-author of 6 books, and has contributed to approximately 140 educational and scientific publications. He has been an Honorary Member of the Lisbon Swimming Association since 1980 and of Sport Algés e Dafundo since 2002. In 2005, he was awarded the Municipal Merit Medal - Gold Degree - by the Municipality of Oeiras in recognition of his outstanding services to the Municipality and the country.
