= Tomás Becerra =

Colombian swimmer

Personal information
- Born: September 7, 1953 (age 72)

Sport
- Sport: Swimming
Medal record
Representing Colombia
Central American and Caribbean Games
Gold medal – first place	1970 Panama City	200m freestyle
Gold medal – first place	1970 Panama City	400m freestyle
Gold medal – first place	1970 Panama City	200m butterfly
Gold medal – first place	1970 Panama City	200m individual medley
Gold medal – first place	1970 Panama City	400m individual medley

Tomás Becerra (born 7 September 1953) is a Colombian former swimmer who competed in the 1968 Summer Olympics, in the 1972 Summer Olympics, and in the 1976 Summer Olympics.
