= Graham Windeatt =

Australian swimmer (born 1954)

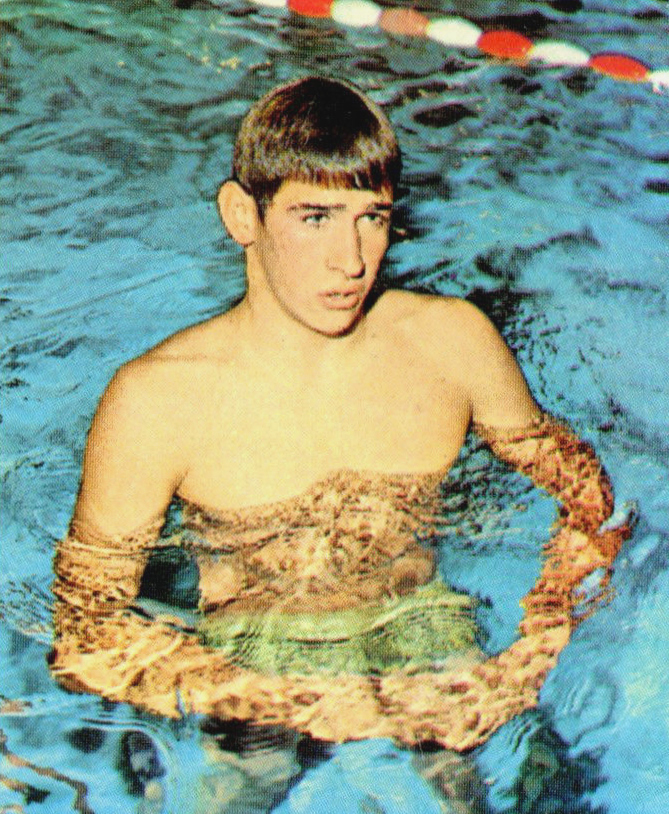
- Graham Windeatt in 1972

Personal information
- Full name: Graham Claude Windeatt
- National team: Australia
- Born: 5 August 1954 (age 71)
- Height: 1.87 m (6 ft 2 in)
- Weight: 78 kg (172 lb)

Sport
- Sport: Swimming
- Strokes: Freestyle
- College team: University of Tennessee
Medal record
Representing Australia
Olympic Games
Silver medal – second place	1972 Munich	1500 m freestyle
Commonwealth Games
Gold medal – first place	1970 Edinburgh	1500 m freestyle

Graham Claude Windeatt (born 5 August 1954) is an Australian former long-distance freestyle swimmer of the 1970s, who won a silver medal in the 1500-metre freestyle at the 1972 Summer Olympics in Munich.

In 1971 as a school student Windeatt broke the men's world 800-metre freestyle record in the NSW Combined High Schools Swimming Championships held at North Sydney pool.

Windeatt made his debut at the 1970 Commonwealth Games in Edinburgh, where he claimed gold in the 1500-metre freestyle. In Munich, he was involved in an epic battle with the reigning 1500-metre Olympic champion from 1968, the United States' Mike Burton. After leading for 600 metres, Burton was passed by Windeatt, before reclaiming the lead in the last 300 metres. Later in the Olympics, Windeatt came fourth in the 400-metre freestyle. Windeatt also placed seventh in the 400-metre individual medley and fifth in the 4×200-metre freestyle relay.

Following the Munich Olympic Games, he took up a swimming scholarship to the University of Tennessee. During his time at the university he became an All-American and with the team won conference championships and placings in National Collegiate championships.

Windeatt was also selected for the 1975 World Championship just missing a medal in the 400-metre freestyle and competing in the 200-metre freestyle final. The year following he was Australian Swim Team Captain for the 1976 Montreal Olympics.

Other highlights of his swim career include: Awarded Australian Sports medal by Governor General Australia;Olympic Games record holder; Commonwealth Games record holder; Best all-round swimmer in the 104 year history of Australian swimming; winning 10 different National titles 7 individual and 3 relay; National champion 10k open water swimming; National Open Surf and Open Surf Belt Champion

Windeatt was coached for 12 years by Australian Olympic coach Don Talbot AO OBE, and Ray Bussard University of Tennessee.

After retiring from competition Windeatt worked with a number of the best swim coaches in the world, presenting coaching clinics in Australia, China, Japan, and South East Asia. Coaches included David Haller - 10-time Olympic coach for Great Britain; Forbes Carlile Olympic coach and Australian coaching icon, Randy Reece - 3-time Olympic coach for USA; Don Gambril 5-time Olympic coach for USA.

Windeatt's focus on the biomechanical principles of swimming was introduced to him by Jim 'Doc' Councilman 2-time US Olympic coach, and coach of the all-conquering Indiana University swim team, winning 6 NCAA titles in a row. Councilman authored the ground-breaking book of the day - The Science of Swimming.

Windeatt went on to found SwimTech a service dedicated to helping swimmers of all levels with easier faster and more enjoyable swimming, through better technique.

He married Nira Stove in 1979, they have two adult children.

== See also ==
- List of Commonwealth Games medallists in swimming (men)
- List of Olympic medalists in swimming (men)
- World record progression 800 metres freestyle
