= Roger Pyttel =

East German swimmer

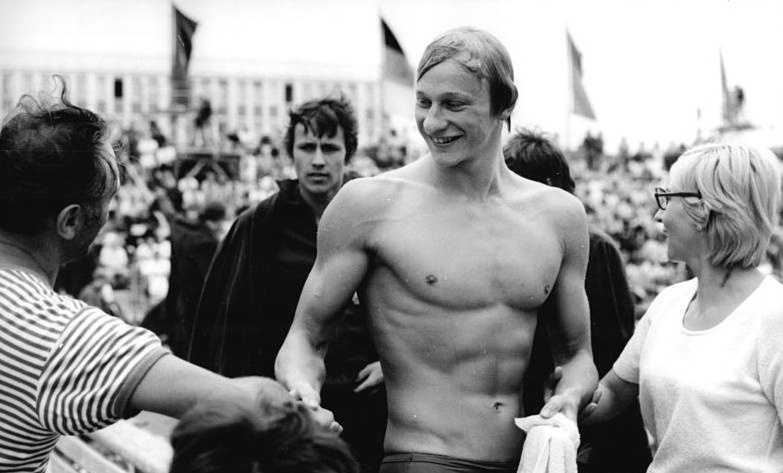
- Pyttel in 1973.

Personal information
- Nationality: East German
- Born: 8 May 1957 (age 69) Wolfen, East Germany
- Height: 1.93 m (6 ft 4 in)
- Weight: 86 kg (190 lb)

Sport
- Sport: Swimming
- Strokes: Butterfly
- Club: SC DHfK Leipzig
Medal record
Representing East Germany
Olympic Games
Silver medal – second place	1980 Moscow	100 m butterfly
Bronze medal – third place	1980 Moscow	200 m butterfly
World Championships (LC)
Silver medal – second place	1973 Belgrade	4×100 m medley
Silver medal – second place	1975 Cali	100 m butterfly
Silver medal – second place	1975 Cali	200 m butterfly
Bronze medal – third place	1973 Belgrade	200 m freestyle
Bronze medal – third place	1973 Belgrade	4×100 m freestyle
Bronze medal – third place	1978 Berlin	200 m butterfly
European Championships (LC)
Gold medal – first place	1974 Vienna	100 m butterfly
Gold medal – first place	1977 Jönköping	100 m butterfly
Silver medal – second place	1977 Jönköping	4×100 m medley
Bronze medal – third place	1974 Vienna	4×100 m freestyle
Bronze medal – third place	1977 Jönköping	4×200 m freestyle

Roger Pyttel (born 8 May 1957 in Wolfen) is a former German butterfly swimmer. After failing to place in various races during the 1972 and 1976 Olympics, Pyttel attained both a silver and bronze medal in the 1980 Summer Olympics in Moscow.

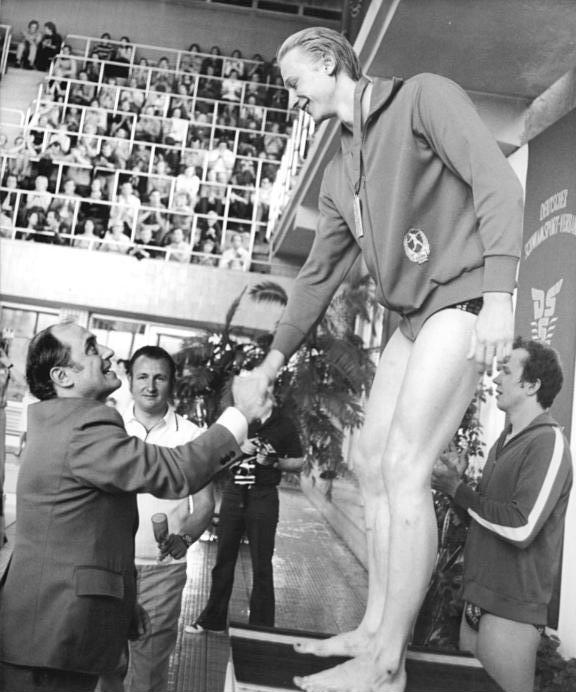
