= Brian Brinkley =

British swimmer (born 1953)

Personal information
- Full name: Brian Brinkley
- National team: Great Britain
- Born: 28 December 1953 (age 72) Peterborough, England
- Height: 1.90 m (6 ft 3 in)
- Weight: 79 kg (174 lb; 12.4 st)

Sport
- Sport: Swimming
- Strokes: Freestyle, butterfly, individual medley
- Club: Modernian Swimming Club
- Coach: Charlie Wilson
Medal record
Men's swimming
Representing Great Britain
Olympic Games
| Bronze medal – third place | 1976 Montreal | 4×200 m freestyle |
World Championships (LC)
| Silver medal – second place | 1975 Cali | 4×200 m freestyle |
| Bronze medal – third place | 1975 Cali | 200 m butterfly |
| Bronze medal – third place | 1975 Cali | 200 m freestyle |
| Bronze medal – third place | 1975 Cali | 4×100 m medley |
European Championships
| Silver medal – second place | 1974 Vienna | 200 m butterfly |
| Silver medal – second place | 1974 Vienna | 4×100 m medley |
Representing England
Commonwealth Games
| Gold medal – first place | 1974 Christchurch | 200 m butterfly |
| Silver medal – second place | 1974 Christchurch | 200 m medley |
| Silver medal – second place | 1974 Christchurch | 400 m medley |
| Silver medal – second place | 1974 Christchurch | 4×200 m freestyle |
| Bronze medal – third place | 1974 Christchurch | 4×100 m freestyle |
| Bronze medal – third place | 1974 Christchurch | 4×100 m medley |

Brian Brinkley MBE (born 28 December 1953) is an English former competitive swimmer who represented Great Britain in the Olympic Games, FINA world championships and European championships, and England in the Commonwealth Games, during the 1970s. During his elite swimming career, he won thirteen medals in major international swimming championships.

== Swimming career ==
At the 1972 Summer Olympics in Munich, West Germany, Brinkley qualified to compete in six events: the 100-, 200-, 400- and 1500-metre freestyle events, the 200-metre butterfly, and the 4x200-metre freestyle relay. His best performances were fourth in the 400-metre freestyle final, and eighth as a member of the British men's team in the 4x200-metre freestyle relay.

Brinkley was a member of the British national team at the 1974 European Aquatics Championships in Vienna, winning a pair of silver medals in the men's 200-metre butterfly and as a member of the British team in the 4x100-metre medley relay.

When Christchurch, New Zealand hosted the 1974 British Commonwealth Games, he swam for England in six events, winning medals in all of them. He won a gold medal for his first-place performance in the 200-metre butterfly, and two silver medals for finishing second in the 200-metre and 400-metre individual medley events. He was also a member of all three of England's relay teams, winning a silver in the 4x200-metre freestyle, and bronzes in the 4x100-metre freestyle and 4x100-metre medley.

At the 1975 World Aquatics Championships, he won a silver medal with the British men in the 4x200-metre freestyle relay, and three bronze medals in the 200-metre freestyle, 200-metre butterfly, and 4x100-metre medley relay. He was appointed MBE in the 1976 New Year Honours.

A year later in Montreal, Quebec, at the 1976 Summer Olympics, Brinkley competed in four events. He was a member of the fourth-place British team in the men's 4x100-metre medley relay, and won a bronze medal with the third-place British men in the 4x200-metre freestyle relay. In individual competition, he advanced to the event final of the 200-metre butterfly and came sixth. He also swam in the preliminary heats of the 200-metre freestyle but did not advance.

He won the 1974 ASA National Championship 100 metres freestyle title, was a five times winner of the 200 metres freestyle (1971–1975) and a four times winner of the 400 metres freestyle in (1971-1974). He also won the 1972 ASA British National 1500 metres freestyle title and the 200 metres butterfly title in 1972, 1973 and 1974.

== Coaching ==
Later, while coaching at Peterborough (his home town), he coached channel swimmers and was in a successful relay channel team in 1987

== See also ==
- List of Commonwealth Games medallists in swimming (men)
- List of European Aquatics Championships medalists in swimming (men)
- List of Olympic medalists in swimming (men)
- List of World Aquatics Championships medalists in swimming (men)
