= David López-Zubero =

Spanish-American swimmer (born 1959)

David Zubero
Personal information
- Full name: David López-Zubero Purcell
- National team: Spain
- Born: 11 February 1959 (age 67) Syracuse, New York, U.S.
- Height: 1.78 m (5 ft 10 in)
- Weight: 75 kg (165 lb)

Sport
- Sport: Swimming
- Strokes: Freestyle, Butterfly
- Club: Club Náutico Metropole
- College team: University of Florida
Medal record
Men's swimming
Representing Spain
Olympic Games
Bronze medal – third place	1980 Moscow	100 m butterfly
European Championships (LC)
Silver medal – second place	1983 Rome	100 m butterfly
Mediterranean Games
Gold medal – first place	1979 Split	200 m freestyle
Gold medal – first place	1979 Split	100 m butterfly
Gold medal – first place	1983 Casablanca	100 m butterfly
Gold medal – first place	1983 Casablanca	200 m medley

David López-Zubero Purcell (born 11 February 1959), also known as David Zubero, is a former competitive swimmer who represented Spain at three Summer Olympics and won an Olympic bronze medal in 1980. Zubero was born in the United States, swam in international competition for Spain, and holds dual Spanish-American citizenship.

Zubero was born in Syracuse, New York. He attended the Bolles School in Jacksonville, Florida, where he swam for the Bolles high school swim team. He graduated from the Bolles School in 1977.

Zubero attended the University of Florida in Gainesville, Florida, where he swam for coach Randy Reese's Florida Gators swimming and diving team in National Collegiate Athletic Association (NCAA) competition from 1977 to 1981. He competed in the championship finals of the 200-yard individual medley all four years. Zubero swam on the Gators 800-yard freestyle relay team that set an American record and tied the NCAA record, while winning the national title in that event in 1979. He also swam on another national championship 800-yard freestyle relay in 1981. During his four years as a Gator swimmer, Zubero received fourteen All-American honors.

Zubero graduated from the University of Florida with a bachelor's degree in microbiology and cell science in 1983, and was inducted into the University of Florida Athletic Hall of Fame as a "Gator Great" in 2002.

David Zubero is the older brother of the 1992 Olympic champion in the 200-meter backstroke, Martin López-Zubero. The younger Zubero also attended the University of Florida and competed for Spain internationally.

Zubero represented Spain in three consecutive Summer Olympics, starting in 1976. At the 1980 Summer Olympics in Moscow, he placed third in the 100-meter butterfly. He also swam in the 1984 Summer Olympics in Los Angeles, tying for twelfth in the 100-meter butterfly and also swimming for the eleventh-place Spanish men's team in the 4x100-meter freestyle relay.

Zubero served as an assistant coach under Ralph Crocker and Gary Butts for the Pine Crest School in Fort Lauderdale, Florida in the 1990s. He earned a master's degree in science education from Nova Southeastern University in Broward County, Florida.

== See also ==
- List of Olympic medalists in swimming (men)
- List of Spanish records in swimming
- List of University of Florida alumni
- List of University of Florida Olympians
- List of University of Florida Athletic Hall of Fame members
