= Gianni Versari =

Panamanian swimmer (born 1958)

Personal information
- Born: 7 February 1958 (age 68)

Sport
- Sport: Swimming

Gianni Versari (born 7 February 1958) is a Panamanian former swimmer. He competed in two events at the 1976 Summer Olympics.
