= Jim Montgomery (swimmer) =

American swimmer (born 1955)

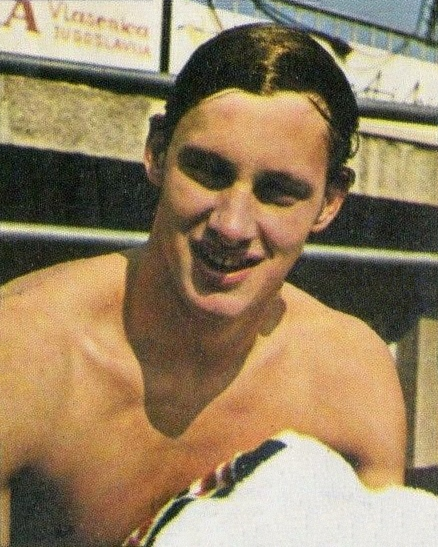
- Montgomery in 1974

Personal information
- Full name: James Paul Montgomery
- Nickname: Jim
- National team: United States
- Born: January 24, 1955 (age 71) Madison, Wisconsin, U.S.
- Occupation: Swim Coach
- Height: 6 ft 3 in (1.91 m)
- Weight: 194 lb (88 kg)

Sport
- Sport: Swimming
- Strokes: Freestyle
- Club: Gatorade Swim Club
- College team: Indiana University
- Coach: Doc Counsilman
Medal record
Men's swimming
Representing the United States
Olympic Games
Gold medal – first place	1976 Montreal	100 m freestyle
Gold medal – first place	1976 Montreal	4×200 m freestyle
Gold medal – first place	1976 Montreal	4×100 m medley
Bronze medal – third place	1976 Montreal	200 m freestyle
World Aquatics Championships
Gold medal – first place	1973 Belgrade	100 m freestyle
Gold medal – first place	1973 Belgrade	200 m freestyle
Gold medal – first place	1973 Belgrade	4×100 m freestyle
Gold medal – first place	1973 Belgrade	4×200 m freestyle
Gold medal – first place	1973 Belgrade	4×100 m medley
Gold medal – first place	1975 Cali	4×100 m freestyle
Bronze medal – third place	1975 Cali	100 m freestyle
Gold medal – first place	1978 Berlin	4×100 m freestyle
Silver medal – second place	1978 Berlin	100 m freestyle

James Paul Montgomery (born January 24, 1955) is an American former competition swimmer, four-time Olympic medalist, and former world record-holder. Montgomery was the first man to break the 50-second barrier (49.99) in the 100-meter freestyle, at the 1976 Summer Olympics in Montreal, Quebec, where he won three gold medals and one bronze.

== Early swimming ==
Montgomery was born to Mr. and Mrs. Thomas F. Montgomery in Madison, Wisconsin, on January 24, 1955. He began swimming competitively around the age of nine at the Madison Central YMCA pool. He swam for Madison East High School, and held four Wisconsin state freestyle records by his High School Junior year, including the 50, 100, 200, and 400 freestyle. He was coached by Bob Moerke at Madison East, and in club swimming by Pat Berry at the Madison Swim Club, switching to the Badger Dolphins the summer before his Junior year. While swimming with the Badger Dolphins Club during summers, Jim credited his coach Jack Pettinger with greatly improving his speed and conditioning.

Jim helped lead Madison East to the 1971 Big Eight Conference title, and was voted a most valuable competitor at Madison's City Swimming Banquet in March 1971. In September, 1971, he was named the outstanding swimmer in Wisconsin by the Wisconsin Swimming Association and became a part of the five member all-state boys swimming team.

== International competition ==
Prior to the Olympics, Montgomery won five gold medals in freestyle events at the first World Championships in 1973 in Belgrade, Yugoslavia, and took medals in the 4 x 100 meter freestyle relay and the individual 100 meter freestyle at both the 1975 World Aquatics Championships in Cali, Colombia and the 1978 World Aquatics Championships in Berlin, Germany.

== Indiana University ==
From Yugoslavia in early September 1973, Montgomery went on to Indiana University Bloomington, where he majored in Business, and swam for Hall of Fame Coach Doc Counsilman for four years. At Indiana, he won the NCAA 200-yard freestyle and four AAU titles. In 1975 while at Indiana, he set two world records for the 100-meter freestyle and between 1973-1976 was a member of five world record breaking relay teams. Considered the top student athlete in the Big Ten Conference, Jim was presented with the Belfour award in his Senior year at Indiana.

== 1976 Montreal Olympics ==
In the summer between his junior and senior college years, he competed in the 1976 Montreal Olympic Games winning golds in the 100-meter freestyle, the 4x200 meter freestyle relay, and the 4x100 meter medley relay, with each an Olympic and World record time. He also won a bronze in the 200-meter freestyle. Jim was the world record holder in the 100-meter event prior to the Olympic Games with a time of 50.59. Only 20 days after Jim set the new world record in the 100-meter freestyle of 49.99 during the '76 Montreal Olympics, University of Alabama swimmer Jonty Skinner broke Jim's record at Philadelphia's United States Summer National Swimming Championships by 0.55 seconds. At the Montreal Olympics, Jim was coached both by his Indiana Coach Doc Counsilman, who was Olympic Head Coach, and Assistant Olympic Coach Don Gambril who was assigned to work with Montgomery by Counsilman.

During his coaching career he has taken time to compete in organized open-water swims which include the Maui Channel Swim, the La Jolla Roughwater, the Alcatraz, the Chesapeake Bay swim, and France's Race across St. Tropez. He has had several age-group wins in the 2.4 mile Waikiki Roughwater swim.

== Coaching ==
After professional swimming, and a move to Dallas, Texas, he worked briefly in hotel management and founded the Dallas Masters swim program in 1981. He later renamed it the Lone Star Masters and in 1990, the name officially became Baylor/Lone Star Masters while Jim was working as Aquatic's Director at Baylor's Tom Landry Center in Dallas. He began teaching swim lessons in 2007, including a class to help adults get past their fear of water.

=== Dallas Aquatic Masters ===
Renaming the Baylor/Lone Star Masters team, he founded the Dallas Aquatic Masters club around 1999 with partner and fellow coach, former SMU All-American swimmer Bobby Patten. In 2002, Jim was named U.S. Masters Swimming (USMS) Coach of the Year.

=== Montgomery Swim School ===
While continuing to coach at Dallas Aquatic Masters, he coached varsity swimming at the Greenhill School in Addison, Texas from 1999 to 2015. Dallas Aquatic Masters continued to operate until around 2020. Jim resigned Greenhill around 2015 to launch the Jim Montgomery Swim School on Preston Road in Dallas, a business Jim had continued to Coach and manage.

=== Honors ===
He was inducted into the International Swimming Hall of Fame in 1986 as an Honor Swimmer.

Montgomery married in 1992, and has five children.

== See also ==
- List of Indiana University (Bloomington) people
- List of multiple Olympic gold medalists at a single Games
- List of Olympic medalists in swimming (men)
- List of World Aquatics Championships medalists in swimming (men)
- World record progression 100 metres freestyle
- World record progression 4 × 100 metres freestyle relay
- World record progression 4 × 100 metres medley relay
- World record progression 4 × 200 metres freestyle relay

== Selected works ==
- Mastering Swimming / Your guide for fitness, training, and competition, by Jim Montgomery/Mo Chambers, Human Kinetics Publishers, 2008-10-24, ISBN 978-0-7360-7453-7

Records
Preceded by Mark Spitz	Men's 100-meter freestyle world record-holder (long course); June 21, 1975 – August 3, 1975	Succeeded by Andy Coan
Preceded by Andy Coan	Men's 100-meter freestyle world record-holder (long course); August 23, 1975 – August 14, 1976	Succeeded by Jonty Skinner
