= Fritz Warncke =

Norwegian swimmer

Personal information
- Nationality: Norwegian
- Born: 29 December 1955 (age 70) Bergen, Norway

Sport
- Sport: Swimming

Fritz Warncke (born 29 December 1955) is a Norwegian freestyle swimmer. He was born in Bergen. He competed at the 1972 Summer Olympics in Munich and at the 1976 Summer Olympics in Montreal.

He won a total of seventeen national senior swimming titles, including fifteen frestyle titles, one in butterfly, and one in medley.
