= Bengt Gingsjö =

Swedish swimmer (1952–2022)

Personal information
- Full name: Bengt Ingvar Gingsjö
- Nationality: Swedish
- Born: 15 April 1952 Gothenburg, Västra Götaland, Sweden
- Died: 14 September 2022 (aged 70) Tyresö, Stockholm, Sweden
- Height: 1.89 m (6 ft 2 in)

Sport
- Sport: Swimming
- Strokes: Freestyle
- Club: S02, Göteborg
Medal record
Men's swimming
Representing Sweden
World Championships (LC)
Bronze medal – third place	1973 Belgrade	400 m freestyle
European Championships (LC)
Silver medal – second place	1974 Vienna	400 m freestyle
Bronze medal – third place	1974 Vienna	4×200 m freestyle

Bengt Gingsjö (15 April 1952 – 14 September 2022) was a Swedish freestyle and medley swimmer, who competed in the 1972 Summer Olympics and 1976 Summer Olympics. He finished fourth on the 1500m freestyle in 1972. Gingsjö also won a bronze medal in the 400 m freestyle at the first FINA World Aquatics Championships in 1973.

== Clubs ==
- Simavdelningen 1902
