= Marc Lazzaro =

French swimmer (born 1955)

Personal information
- Born: 10 November 1955 (age 70)

Sport
- Sport: Swimming
Medal record
Representing France
Mediterranean Games
Silver medal – second place	1975 Algiers	400m freestyle

Marc Lazzaro (born 10 November 1955) is a French former freestyle swimmer. He competed at the 1976 Summer Olympics and the 1980 Summer Olympics.
