= Peter Nocke =

German swimmer

Medal record

Men's swimming

Representing West Germany

Olympic Games
Bronze medal – third place	1976 Montreal	100 m freestyle

World Championships (LC)
Gold medal – first place	1975 Cali	4×200 m freestyle
Silver medal – second place	1975 Cali	4×100 m freestyle
Silver medal – second place	1975 Cali	4×100 m medley
Bronze medal – third place	1973 Belgrade	4×200 m freestyle

European Championships (LC)
Gold medal – first place	1974 Vienna	100 m freestyle
Gold medal – first place	1974 Vienna	200 m freestyle
Gold medal – first place	1974 Vienna	4×100 m freestyle
Gold medal – first place	1974 Vienna	4×200 m freestyle
Gold medal – first place	1974 Vienna	4×100 m medley
Gold medal – first place	1977 Jönköping	100 m freestyle
Gold medal – first place	1977 Jönköping	200 m freestyle
Gold medal – first place	1977 Jönköping	4×100 m freestyle
Gold medal – first place	1977 Jönköping	4×100 m medley
Silver medal – second place	1977 Jönköping	4×200 m freestyle

Peter Nocke (born 25 October 1955 in Langenberg, North Rhine-Westphalia) is a retired freestyle swimmer, who represented West Germany at the 1976 Summer Olympics in Montreal, Quebec, Canada. There he won the bronze medal in the men's 100 m freestyle. Nocke won a total number of nine European titles during the 1970s.
