= Andrey Krylov (swimmer born 1956) =

Soviet swimmer

Medal record

Men's swimming

Representing the Soviet Union

Olympic Games
Gold medal – first place	1980 Moscow	4×200 m freestyle
Silver medal – second place	1976 Montreal	4×200 m freestyle
Silver medal – second place	1980 Moscow	200 m freestyle
Silver medal – second place	1980 Moscow	400 m freestyle

World Championships (LC)
Silver medal – second place	1978 Berlin	4×200 m freestyle
Bronze medal – third place	1975 Cali	4×200 m freestyle

European Championships (LC)
Gold medal – first place	1977 Jönköping	4×200 m freestyle
Silver medal – second place	1974 Vienna	4×200 m freestyle
Silver medal – second place	1977 Jönköping	200 m freestyle
Bronze medal – third place	1974 Vienna	400 m freestyle
Bronze medal – third place	1977 Jönköping	4×100 m freestyle

Andrey Ivanovich Krylov (Russian: Андрей Иванович Крылов; born 10 May 1956 in Leningrad) is a former freestyle swimmer from the Soviet Union and four-time Olympic medalist. He first won a silver medal in the 4x200 freestyle relay at the 1976 Summer Olympics in Montreal, Quebec, Canada. Four years later in Moscow Krylov won gold in the 4x200 freestyle relay and silver in the 200m freestyle and 400m freestyle.
