= Jorge Delgado (swimmer) =

Ecuadorian swimmer (born 1954)

Personal information
- Full name: Jorge Delgado Panchana, Jr.
- Nationality: Ecuadorian
- Born: January 5, 1954 (age 72)
- Height: 1.82 m (6 ft 0 in)
- Weight: 64 kg (141 lb)

Sport
- Sport: Swimming
- Strokes: Butterfly, Freestyle
Medal record
Men's swimming
Representing Ecuador
Pan American Games
Gold medal – first place	1971 Cali	200 m butterfly
Gold medal – first place	1975 Mexico City	200 m freestyle
Bronze medal – third place	1975 Mexico City	200 m butterfly

Jorge Delgado (born 5 January 1954) is an Ecuadorian former swimmer who competed in the 1972 Summer Olympics and in the 1976 Summer Olympics and became President of the Ecuadorian National Olympic Committee (ECU) after being elected on September 4, 2021.
