= Werner Lampe =

German swimmer

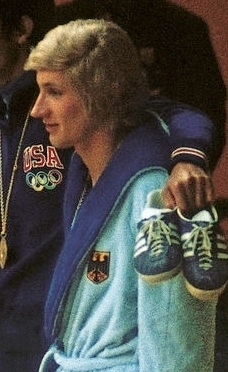
- Steve Genter, Mark Spitz and Werner Lampe after winning the 200 m freestyle at the 1972 Olympics

Personal information
- Born: 30 November 1952 (age 73) Hannover, West Germany
- Height: 1.95 m (6 ft 5 in)
- Weight: 80 kg (176 lb)

Sport
- Sport: Swimming
- Club: SSF Bonn 1905, Bonn; SVW 05, Würzburg
Medal record
Representing West Germany
Olympic Games
| Silver medal – second place | 1972 Munich | 4×200 m freestyle |
| Bronze medal – third place | 1972 Munich | 200 m freestyle |
World Championships
| Bronze medal – third place | 1973 Belgrade | 4×200 m freestyle |
| Gold medal – first place | 1975 Cali | 4×200 m freestyle |
European Championships
| Gold medal – first place | 1970 Barcelona | 4×200 m freestyle |
| Silver medal – second place | 1970 Barcelona | 1500 m freestyle |

Werner Lampe (born 30 November 1952) is a retired German swimmer and Olympic medalist. He is the brother of Hans Lampe and father of Oliver Lampe. He participated at the 1972 and 1976 Summer Olympics, winning a silver medal in 4 × 200 m freestyle relay, and a bronze medal in 200 m freestyle in 1972.

Lampe shaved off his hair before the 200 m Olympic race in 1972 to reduce the water drag, and then wore a wig at the award ceremony.

After retiring from competitions Lampe worked as a swimming coach. In 2005, aged 52, he defended a PhD at the University of Hannover on the role of exercise in diabetics and overweight persons.
