= Wilfried Hartung =

East German swimmer

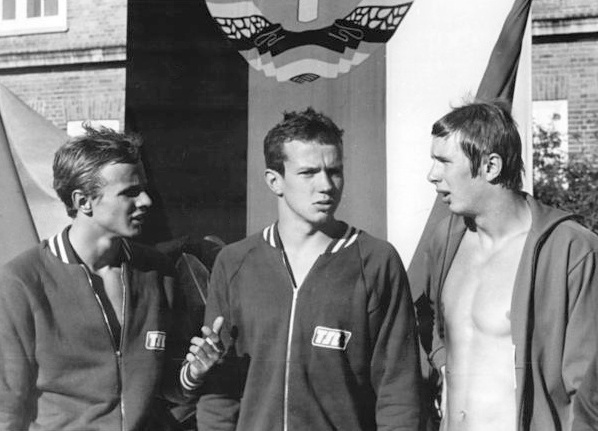
- Wilfried Hartung (left) in 1971

Personal information
- Born: 16 August 1953 (age 72) East Berlin, East Germany
- Height: 1.83 m (6 ft 0 in)
- Weight: 66 kg (146 lb)

Sport
- Sport: Swimming
- Club: Berliner TSC
Medal record
Representing East Germany
Olympic Games
Bronze medal – third place	1972 Munich	4×100 m freestyle
European Championships
Bronze medal – third place	1970 Barcelona	4×200 m freestyle
Bronze medal – third place	1974 Amsterdam/Vienna	4×100 m freestyle

Wilfried Hartung (born 16 August 1953) is a retired German swimmer. Born in East Berlin, East Germany, he competed at the 1972 and 1976 Summer Olympics and won a bronze medal in the 4 × 100 m freestyle relay in 1972. He is the divorced husband of two-time silver Olympic swimmer Gabriele Wetzko.

== European championships ==
At the 1970 European Aquatics Championships he finished in sixth place in the 400 m freestyle. The East German 4×200 m freestyle relay team, of which he was part, won the bronze medal. At the 1974 European Aquatics Championships his team won a bronze medal in the 4×100 m freestyle relay.

== Summer Olympics ==
In 1972 he competed in the 100 m, 200 m, 4×100 m and 4×200 m freestyle events. His team won a bronze medal in the 4×100 m relay. In 1976 he was part of the East German 4×200 m freestyle team that was placed fifth.

== World championships ==
At the 1973 FINA World Aquatics Championships, Hartung competed in the 4×200 m freestyle relay and finished in fourth place. In 1975, he was part of two relay teams: 4 × 100 m, in which East Germany got sixth place, and 4 × 200 m, in which his team finished fifth.
