= Swimming at the 1973 World Aquatics Championships – Women's 800 metre freestyle =

Women's 800 metre freestyle at the 1973 World Aquatics Championships
- Venue: Tašmajdan Sports Centre
- Location: Belgrade, Yugoslavia
- Dates: 9 September 1973
- Competitors: 24 from 17 nations
- Winning time: 8:52.973 WR

Medalists
gold medal	Novella Calligaris	Italy
silver medal	Jo Harshbarger	United States
bronze medal	Gudrun Wegner	East Germany

The women's 800 metre freestyle competition of the swimming events at the 1973 World Aquatics Championships took place on 9 September.

== Records ==
Prior to the competition, the existing world and championship records were as follows.

World record	Keena Rothhammer (USA)	8:53.68	Munich, West Germany	3 September 1972
Competition record	N/A	N/A	N/A	N/A

The following records were established during the competition:

Date	Event	Name	Nationality	Time	Record
9 September	Timed Final	Marina Maliutina	Soviet Union	9:45.644	CR
9 September	Timed Final	Angela Franke	East Germany	9:09.677	CR
9 September	Timed Final	Novella Calligaris	Italy	8:52.973	WR

== Results ==
24 swimmers participated in 3 heats. The event was a timed final. The first two heats were contested in the morning with the third and final heat contested in the evening.

Rank	Heat	Lane	Name	Nationality	Time	Notes
1st place, gold medalist(s)	3	-	Novella Calligaris	Italy	8:52.973	WR
2nd place, silver medalist(s)	3	-	Jo Harshbarger	United States	8:55.560	
3rd place, bronze medalist(s)	3	-	Gudrun Wegner	East Germany	9:01.823	
4	2	-	Angela Franke	East Germany	9:09.677	CR
5	3	-	Narelle Moras	Australia	9:09.936	
6	3	-	Keena Rothhammer	United States	9:15.725	
7	2	-	Elisa Gunston	Sweden	9:22.129	
8	3	-	Sandra Yost	Australia	9:22.493	
9	2	-	M. De Angelis	Italy	9:23.206	
10	3	-	Anne Marie McCaffrey	Canada	9:23.503	
11	3	-	Leslie Cliff	Canada	9:27.647	
12	2	-	Maria Guimarães	Brazil	9:27.920	
13	2	-	Roselina Angel	Colombia	9:42.695	
14	1	-	Marina Maliutina	Soviet Union	9:45.644	CR
15	1	-	Sandra Arambatsis	Venezuela	9:51.384	
16	2	-	Naoko Shio	Japan	9:51.499	
17	2	-	Tatyana Skvortsova	Soviet Union	9:57.458	
18	2	-	Svetlana Pavletic	Yugoslavia	10:04.873	
19	1	-	Elzbieta Pilawska	Poland	10:06.768	
20	1	-	Eva Tomandl	Austria	10:11.277	
21	1	-	Loida Moreda	Puerto Rico	10:18.319	
22	1	-	Myriam Mizouni	Tunisia	10:28.992	
-	1	-	Belinda Phillips	Jamaica	-	DNS / DSQ
-	1	-	Leslie Thompson	Puerto Rico	-	DNS / DSQ
