= Swimming at the 1973 World Aquatics Championships – Men's 100 metre butterfly =

Men's 100 metre butterfly at the 1973 World Aquatics Championships
- Dates: September 8, 1973
- Competitors: 25 from 20 nations
- Winning time: 55.69 CR

Medalists
gold medal	Bruce Robertson	Canada
silver medal	Joe Bottom	United States
bronze medal	Robin Backhaus	United States

The men's 100 metre butterfly competition of the swimming events at the 1973 World Aquatics Championships took place on September 8.

== Records ==
Prior to the competition, the existing world and championship records were as follows.

World record	Mark Spitz (USA)	54.27	Munich, West Germany	31 August 1972
Competition record	N/A	N/A	N/A	N/A

The following records were established during the competition:

Date	Event	Name	Nationality	Time	Record
8 September	Heat 1	Hartmut Flöckner	East Germany	56.89	CR
8 September	Heat 4	Joe Bottom	United States	55.94	CR
8 September	Final	Bruce Robertson	Canada	55.69	CR

== Results ==
=== Heats ===
25 swimmers participated in 4 heats. The eight fastest times advanced to the final.

Rank	Heat	Lane	Name	Nationality	Time	Notes
1	4	-	Joe Bottom	United States	55.94	Q, CR
2	1	-	Hartmut Flöckner	East Germany	56.89	Q, CR
3	3	-	Bruce Robertson	Canada	56.90	Q
4	2	-	Robin Backhaus	United States	56.94	Q
5	3	-	Jorge Delgado	Ecuador	57.35	Q
6	4	-	Ross Seymour	Australia	57.58	Q
7	1	-	Folkert Meeuw	West Germany	57.69	Q
8	1	-	Neil Rogers	Australia	57.98	Q
9	2	-	Hideaki Hara	Japan	58.00	
10	3	-	Miguel Lang	Spain	58.47	
11	2	-	Brian Phillips	Canada	58.68	
12	2	-	Istvan Szentirmay	Hungary	59.09	
13	3	-	Jorge Jaramillo	Colombia	59.13	
14	2	-	Eduardo Orejuela	Ecuador	59.21	
15	1	-	Vladimir Krivtsov	Soviet Union	59.47	
16	4	-	Aleksandar Pavličević	Yugoslavia	59.78	
17	4	-	Vasil Dobrev	Bulgaria	59.99	
18	4	-	Piotr Dłucik	Poland	1:00.34	
19	3	-	Eduardo Alijo	Brazil	1:00.39	
20	1	-	José Ferraioli	Puerto Rico	1:00.48	
21	3	-	Sérgio Waismaun	Brazil	1:00.88	
22	1	-	Ramón Volcán	Venezuela	1:01.77	
23	3	-	Jean-Jacques Scheuren	Luxembourg	1:02.68	
24	2	-	Ali Gharbi	Tunisia	1:05.44	
25	4	-	O. Mehmat	Iran	1:09.20	
–	-	-	Roland Mattes	East Germany	-	DNS^{[1]}

^{1} Roland Mattes had to withdraw from the event following a poolside accident when he slipped and sprained his ankle.

=== Final ===
The results of the final are below.

Rank	Lane	Name	Nationality	Time	Notes
1st place, gold medalist(s)	3	Bruce Robertson	Canada	55.69	CR
2nd place, silver medalist(s)	4	Joe Bottom	United States	56.37	
3rd place, bronze medalist(s)	6	Robin Backhaus	United States	56.42	
4	5	Hartmut Flöckner	East Germany	56.75	
5	7	Ross Seymour	Australia	57.33	
6	2	Jorge Delgado	Ecuador	57.41	
7	8	Neil Rogers	Australia	57.58	
8	1	Folkert Meeuw	West Germany	57.81	
