= Swimming at the 1973 World Aquatics Championships – Women's 400 metre freestyle =

Women's 400 metre freestyle at the 1973 World Aquatics Championships
- Dates: September 7, 1973
- Competitors: 26 from 18 nations
- Winning time: 4:20.287 CR

Medalists
gold medal	Heather Greenwood	United States
silver medal	Keena Rothhammer	United States
bronze medal	Novella Calligaris	Italy

The women's 400 metre freestyle competition of the swimming events at the 1973 World Aquatics Championships took place on September 7.

== Records ==
Prior to the competition, the existing world and championship records were as follows.

World record	Keena Rothhammer (USA)	4:18.07	Louisville, United States	22 August 1973
Competition record	N/A	N/A	N/A	N/A

The following records were established during the competition:

Date	Event	Name	Nationality	Time	Record
7 September	Heat	Virginia Rickard	Australia	4:24.994	CR
7 September	Heat	Heather Greenwood	United States	4:24.938	CR
7 September	Final	Heather Greenwood	United States	4:20.287	CR

== Results ==
=== Heats ===
26 swimmers participated in 4 heats, qualified swimmers are listed:

Rank	Heat	Lane	Name	Nationality	Time	Notes
1	3	-	Heather Greenwood	United States	4:24.938	Q, CR
2	1	-	Virginia Rickard	Australia	4:24.994	Q, CR
3	4	-	Keena Rothhammer	United States	4:25.122	Q
4	1	-	Gudrun Wegner	East Germany	4:25.888	Q
5	2	-	Novella Calligaris	Italy	4:27.089	Q
6	4	-	Narelle Moras	Australia	4:30.288	Q
7	2	-	Elke Sehmisch	East Germany	4:31.630	Q
8	2	-	Janice Stenhouse	Canada	4:32.040	Q
9	1	-	Uta Schütz	West Germany	4:33.186	
10	1	-	Maria Guimarães	Brazil	4:34.053	
11	2	-	Irwi Johansson	Sweden	4:34.166	
12	4	-	Anne Marie McCaffrey	Canada	4:37.118	
13	4	-	Federica Stabilini	Italy	4:38.899	
14	2	-	Ileana Morales	Venezuela	4:39.976	
15	3	-	Marie Sundeborg	Sweden	4:45.292	
16	3	-	Tamara Shelofastova	Soviet Union	4:48.743	
17	4	-	S. Arambatsis	Venezuela	4:49.187	
18	2	-	E. Pilawska	Poland	4:49.474	
19	2	-	S. Pavletic	Yugoslavia	4:53.004	
20	4	-	Eleni Avlanitou	Greece	4:53.148	
21	1	-	E. Tomandl	Austria	4:59.692	
22	4	-	L. Moreda	Puerto Rico	5:00.252	
23	4	-	María Mock	Puerto Rico	5:00.906	
24	3	-	Myriam Mizouni	Tunisia	5:04.065	
25	3	-	D. Garcia	Argentina	5:07.040	
26	3	-	Hansje Bunschoten	Netherlands	-	DNS / DQ

=== Final ===
The results of the final are below.

Rank	Lane	Name	Nationality	Time	Notes
1st place, gold medalist(s)	4	Heather Greenwood	United States	4:20.287	CR
2nd place, silver medalist(s)	3	Keena Rothhammer	United States	4:21.507	
3rd place, bronze medalist(s)	2	Novella Calligaris	Italy	4:21.798	ER
4	5	Virginia Rickard	Australia	4:23.486	
5	6	Gudrun Wegner	East Germany	4:24.641	
6	1	Elke Sehmisch	East Germany	4:30.940	
7	8	Janice Stenhouse	Canada	4:31.923	
8	7	Narelle Moras	Australia	4:34.948	
