= Swimming at the 1976 Summer Olympics – Men's 200 metre butterfly =

Men's 200 metre butterfly at the Games of the XXI Olympiad
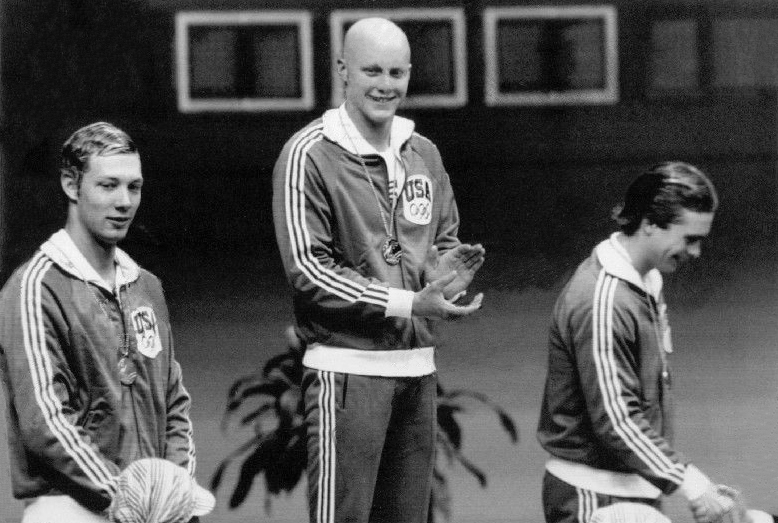
- Left-right: Gregg, Bruner, Forrester
- Venue: Olympic Pool, Montreal
- Date: 18 July 1976 (heats & final)
- Competitors: 40 from 26 nations
- Winning time: 1:59.23 WR

Medalists
1st place, gold medalist(s)		Mike Bruner	United States
2nd place, silver medalist(s)		Steve Gregg	United States
3rd place, bronze medalist(s)		Bill Forrester	United States

The men's 200 metre butterfly event for the 1976 Summer Olympics was held in Montreal, Quebec, Canada. The event took place on 18 July.

== Heats ==
Heat 1

Rank	Athlete	Country	Time	Notes
1	Sean Maher	Great Britain	2:05.95	
2	András Hargitay	Hungary	2:06.20	
3	Csaba Sós	Hungary	2:06.71	
4	Shinsuke Kayama	Japan	2:07.46	
5	Gordon Hewit	Great Britain	2:07.60	
6	Hugo Cuenca	Venezuela	2:11.06	
-	Lawrence Kwoh	Hong Kong	-	DQ

Heat 2

Rank	Athlete	Country	Time	Notes
1	Michael Kraus	West Germany	2:01.91	Q
2	Jorge Jaramillo	Colombia	2:04.30	
3	Jeff Van de Graaf	Australia	2:05.58	
4	Doug Martin	Canada	2:06.81	
5	Adi Prag	Israel	2:09.91	
6	Steven Newkirk	Virgin Islands	2:17.84	

Heat 3

Rank	Athlete	Country	Time	Notes
1	Steve Gregg	United States	2:00.24	Q, OR
2	Brian Brinkley	Great Britain	2:01.93	Q
3	Hideaki Hara	Japan	2:04.68	
4	Anders Bellbring	Sweden	2:07.03	
5	John Daly	Puerto Rico	2:07.13	
6	Carlos González	Panama	2:20.92	

Heat 4

Rank	Athlete	Country	Time	Notes
1	Bill Forrester	United States	2:01.95	Q
2	George Nagy	Canada	2:03.33	
3	Hartmut Flöckner	East Germany	2:05.71	
4	Ricardo Marmolejo	Mexico	2:08.88	
5	Paulo Frischknecht	Portugal	2:20.51	
-	Ross Seymour	Australia	-	DQ

Heat 5

Rank	Athlete	Country	Time	Notes
1	Mike Bruner	United States	2:01.35	Q
2	Jorge Delgado, Jr.	Ecuador	2:01.70	Q
3	Mikhail Gorelik	Soviet Union	2:02.96	
4	Bruce Rogers	Canada	2:04.51	
5	Miguel Lang-Lenton	Spain	2:08.51	
6	Anatoly Smirnov	Soviet Union	2:10.50	
7	François Deley	Belgium	2:12.99	
8	Julio Abreu	Paraguay	2:13.54	

Heat 6

Rank	Athlete	Country	Time	Notes
1	Roger Pyttel	East Germany	2:00.28	Q
2	Oleksandr Manachynskiy	Soviet Union	2:02.91	Q
3	Pär Arvidsson	Sweden	2:03.79	
4	Peter Broscienski	West Germany	2:04.17	
5	John Coutts	New Zealand	2:05.05	
6	Ronald Woutering	Netherlands	2:07.31	
7	Edwin Borja	Philippines	2:10.61	

== Final ==
Rank	Athlete	Country	Time	Notes
1	Mike Bruner	United States	1:59.23	WR
2	Steve Gregg	United States	1:59.54	
3	Bill Forrester	United States	1:59.96	
4	Roger Pyttel	East Germany	2:00.02	
5	Michael Kraus	West Germany	2:00.46	
6	Brian Brinkley	Great Britain	2:01.49	
7	Jorge Delgado, Jr.	Ecuador	2:01.95	
8	Oleksandr Manachynskiy	Soviet Union	2:04.61	
