= Swimming at the 1972 Summer Olympics – Women's 200 metre freestyle =

Women's 200 metre freestyle at the Games of the XX Olympiad
- Venue: Olympia Schwimmhalle
- Date: 1 September 1972 (heats & final)
- Competitors: 33 from 17 nations
- Winning time: 2:03.56 WR

Medalists
1st place, gold medalist(s)		Shane Gould	Australia
2nd place, silver medalist(s)		Shirley Babashoff	United States
3rd place, bronze medalist(s)		Keena Rothhammer	United States

The women's 200 metre freestyle event at the 1972 Olympic Games took place September 1. This swimming event used freestyle swimming, which means that the method of the stroke is not regulated (unlike backstroke, breaststroke, and butterfly events). Nearly all swimmers use the front crawl or a variant of that stroke. Because an Olympic size swimming pool is 50 metres long, this race consisted of four lengths of the pool.

== Results ==
=== Heats ===
Heat 1

Rank	Athlete	Country	Time	Notes
1	Ann Marshall	United States	2:08.12	OR, Q
2	Karin Tülling	East Germany	2:09.01	Q
3	Jutta Weber	West Germany	2:12.44	
4	Merrily Stratten	Canada	2:12.44	
5	Heather Coombridge	New Zealand	2:14.78	
6	Karen LeGresley	Canada	2:16.34	
7	Belinda Phillips	Jamaica	2:19.49	

Heat 2

Rank	Athlete	Country	Time	Notes
1	Anke Rijnders	Netherlands	2:09.09	Q
2	Helen Gray	Australia	2:12.76	
3	Nadezhda Matyukhina	Soviet Union	2:13.60	
4	Françoise Monod	Switzerland	2:15.30	
5	Olga de Angulo	Colombia	2:17.34	
6	Silvia Borgini	Argentina	2:23.11	

Heat 3

Rank	Athlete	Country	Time	Notes
1	Keena Rothhammer	United States	2:07.48	OR, Q
2	Hansje Bunschoten	Netherlands	2:08.58	Q
3	Tatyana Zolotnitskaya	Soviet Union	2:13.12	
4	Yelena Timoshenko	Soviet Union	2:14.06	
5	Diana Sutherland	Great Britain	2:16.00	
6	Ileana Morales	Venezuela	2:18.84	

Heat 4

Rank	Athlete	Country	Time	Notes
1	Shane Gould	Australia	2:07.95	Q
2	Deborah Palmer	Australia	2:10.29	
3	Uta Schütz	West Germany	2:12.84	
4	Mary Beth Rondeau	Canada	2:13.52	
5	Susan Edmondson	Great Britain	2:13.54	
6	Lucy Burle	Brazil	2:18.57	
7	Marcia Arriaga	Mexico	2:18.93	

Heat 5

Rank	Athlete	Country	Time	Notes
1	Andrea Eife	East Germany	2:07.95	OR, Q
2	Shirley Babashoff	United States	2:08.48	Q
3	Gudrun Wegner	East Germany	2:09.49	
4	Angela Steinbach	West Germany	2:10.59	
5	Lesley Allardice	Great Britain	2:13.43	
6	Roselina Angel	Colombia	2:18.62	
7	Hsu Yue-yun	Chinese Taipei	2:20.17	

=== Final ===
Rank	Athlete	Country	Time	Notes
1	Shane Gould	Australia	2:03.56	WR
2	Shirley Babashoff	United States	2:04.33	
3	Keena Rothhammer	United States	2:04.92	
4	Ann Marshall	United States	2:05.45	
5	Andrea Eife	East Germany	2:06.27	
6	Hansje Bunschoten	Netherlands	2:08.40	
7	Anke Rijnders	Netherlands	2:09.41	
8	Karin Tülling	East Germany	2:11.70	

Key: WR = World record
