= Swimming at the 1976 Summer Olympics – Men's 100 metre butterfly =

Men's 100 metre butterfly at the Games of the XXI Olympiad
- Venue: Olympic Pool, Montreal
- Date: 20 July 1976 (heats & semifinals); 21 July 1976 (final)
- Competitors: 44 from 29 nations
- Winning time: 54.35

Medalists
1st place, gold medalist(s)		Matt Vogel	United States
2nd place, silver medalist(s)		Joe Bottom	United States
3rd place, bronze medalist(s)		Gary Hall	United States

The men's 100 metre butterfly event for the 1976 Summer Olympics was held in Montreal. The event took place on 20 and 21 July.

== Heats ==
Heat 1

Rank	Athlete	Country	Time	Notes
1	Yevgeny Seredin	Soviet Union	56.95	Q
2	Bruce Robertson	Canada	57.06	Q
3	Pär Arvidsson	Sweden	57.17	Q
4	Cees Vervoorn	Netherlands	57.84	
5	Rômulo Arantes Filho	Brazil	58.80	
6	Adi Prag	Israel	59.99	
-	François Deley	Belgium	-	DQ

Heat 2

Rank	Athlete	Country	Time	Notes
1	Jorge Delgado, Jr.	Ecuador	56.79	Q
2	Neil Rogers	Australia	57.08	Q
3	Miloslav Roľko	Czechoslovakia	57.79	
4T	Serge Buttet	France	58.37	
4T	Arnaldo Pérez	Puerto Rico	58.37	
6	Riccardo Urbani	Italy	58.83	
7	Carlos González	Panama	1:00.97	

Heat 3

Rank	Athlete	Country	Time	Notes
1	Roger Pyttel	East Germany	55.25	Q
2	Klaus Steinbach	West Germany	56.10	Q
3	Hideaki Hara	Japan	56.57	Q
4	Jorge Jaramillo	Colombia	57.33	
5	Jon Jon Park	Great Britain	57.42	
6	Campari Knoepffler	Nicaragua	1:02.05	

Heat 4

Rank	Athlete	Country	Time	Notes
1	Matt Vogel	United States	55.40	Q
2	Clay Evans	Canada	55.65	Q
3	Peter Broscienski	West Germany	57.15	Q
4T	Paolo Barelli	Italy	57.64	
4T	Oleksandr Manachynskiy	Soviet Union	57.64	
6	José Luis Prado	Mexico	59.16	
7	Paulo Frischknecht	Portugal	1:01.97	
8	Lawrence Kwoh	Hong Kong	1:02.47	

Heat 5

Rank	Athlete	Country	Time	Notes
1	Gary Hall	United States	55.35	Q
2	John Mills	Great Britain	56.53	Q
3	Steve Pickell	Canada	56.59	Q
4	John Coutts	New Zealand	57.29	
5	Hartmut Flöckner	East Germany	57.66	
6	Luis Goicoechea	Venezuela	57.92	
7	John Daly	Puerto Rico	58.04	
8	Steven Newkirk	Virgin Islands	1:01.46	

Heat 6

Rank	Athlete	Country	Time	Notes
1	Joe Bottom	United States	56.26	Q
2	Roland Matthes	East Germany	56.41	Q
3	Michael Kraus	West Germany	57.22	
4	Ross Seymour	Australia	57.74	
5	Richard Iredale	Great Britain	58.50	
6	Shinsuke Kayama	Japan	58.55	
7	Konstantinos Koskinas	Greece	1:00.20	
8	Robert Howard	Ireland	1:00.92	

== Semifinals ==
Heat 1

Rank	Athlete	Country	Time	Notes
1	Joe Bottom	United States	55.26	Q
2	Gary Hall	United States	55.32	Q
3	Neil Rogers	Australia	55.72	Q
4	Clay Evans	Canada	55.86	Q
5	John Mills	Great Britain	56.54	
6	Steve Pickell	Canada	56.66	
7	Pär Arvidsson	Sweden	56.93	
8	Yevgeny Seredin	Soviet Union	57.46	

Heat 2

Rank	Athlete	Country	Time	Notes
1	Roger Pyttel	East Germany	54.75	Q
2	Matt Vogel	United States	54.80	Q
3	Roland Matthes	East Germany	55.88	Q
4	Klaus Steinbach	West Germany	55.90	Q
5	Hideaki Hara	Japan	56.52	
6	Bruce Robertson	Canada	56.72	
7	Peter Broscienski	West Germany	56.81	
8	Jorge Delgado, Jr.	Ecuador	56.91	

== Final ==
Rank	Athlete	Country	Time	Notes
1	Matt Vogel	United States	54.35	
2	Joe Bottom	United States	54.50	
3	Gary Hall	United States	54.65	
4	Roger Pyttel	East Germany	55.09	
5	Roland Matthes	East Germany	55.11	
6	Clay Evans	Canada	55.81	
7	Hideaki Hara	Japan	56.34	
8	Neil Rogers	Australia	56.57	
