= Swimming at the 1972 Summer Olympics – Women's 400 metre freestyle =

Women's 400 metre freestyle at the Games of the XX Olympiad
- Venue: Olympia Schwimmhalle
- Dates: 30 August 1972 (heats & final)
- Competitors: 29 from 17 nations
- Winning time: 4:19.04 WR

Medalists
1st place, gold medalist(s)		Shane Gould	Australia
2nd place, silver medalist(s)		Novella Calligaris	Italy
3rd place, bronze medalist(s)		Gudrun Wegner	East Germany

The women's 400 metre freestyle event at the 1972 Olympic Games took place August 30. This swimming event used freestyle swimming, which means that the method of the stroke is not regulated (unlike backstroke, breaststroke, and butterfly events). Nearly all swimmers use the front crawl or a variant of that stroke. Because an Olympic-size swimming pool is 50 metres long, this race consisted of eight lengths of the pool.

== Results ==
=== Heats ===
Heat 1

Rank	Athlete	Country	Time	Notes
1	Jenny Wylie	United States	4:27.53	OR, Q
2	Anke Rijnders	Netherlands	4:29.94	Q
3	Karin Tülling	East Germany	4:32.56	
4	Federica Stabilini	Italy	4:36.32	
5	Maria Teresa Ramírez	Mexico	4:39.14	
6	Helga Wagner	West Germany	4:47.61	
7	Kirsten Knudsen	Denmark	4:53.76	

Heat 2

Rank	Athlete	Country	Time	Notes
1	Shirley Babashoff	United States	4:31.98	Q
2	Karen Moras	Australia	4:36.14	
3	Mary Beth Rondeau	Canada	4:36.71	
4	Anne Marie McCaffrey	Canada	4:39.92	
5	Roselina Angee	Colombia	4:45.97	
6	Belinda Phillips	Jamaica	4:47.54	
7	Hsu Yue-yun	Chinese Taipei	4:57.58	

Heat 3

Rank	Athlete	Country	Time	Notes
1	Shane Gould	Australia	4:28.46	Q
2	Hansje Bunschoten	Netherlands	4:28.76	Q
3	Uta Schütz	West Germany	4:34.67	
4	Narelle Moras	Australia	4:37.57	
5	Susan Edmondson	Great Britain	4:39.10	
6	Ileana Morales	Venezuela	4:44.73	
7	Diana Sutherland	Great Britain	4:47.66	

Heat 4

Rank	Athlete	Country	Time	Notes
1	Novella Calligaris	Italy	4:24.14	OR, Q
2	Keena Rothhammer	United States	4:24.82	Q
3	Gudrun Wegner	East Germany	4:25.13	Q
4	Olga de Angulo	Colombia	4:40.09	
5	Jaynie Parkhouse	New Zealand	4:40.24	
6	June Green	Great Britain	4:45.81	
7	Eleni Avlonitou	Greece	4:52.10	
8	Patricia López	Argentina	4:59.68	

=== Final ===
Rank	Athlete	Country	Time	Notes
1	Shane Gould	Australia	4:19.04	WR
2	Novella Calligaris	Italy	4:22.44	
3	Gudrun Wegner	East Germany	4:23.11	
4	Shirley Babashoff	United States	4:23.59	
5	Jenny Wylie	United States	4:24.07	
6	Keena Rothhammer	United States	4:24.22	
7	Hansje Bunschoten	Netherlands	4:29.70	
8	Anke Rijnders	Netherlands	4:31.51	

Key: WR = World record
