= Swimming at the 1973 World Aquatics Championships – Women's 200 metre butterfly =

Women's 200 metre butterfly at the 1973 World Aquatics Championships
- Dates: September 8, 1973
- Competitors: 27 from 18 nations
- Winning time: 2:13.766 WR

Medalists
gold medal	Rosemarie Kother	East Germany
silver medal	Roswitha Beier	East Germany
bronze medal	Lynn Colella	United States

The women's 200 metre butterfly competition of the swimming events at the 1973 World Aquatics Championships took place on September 8.

== Records ==
Prior to the competition, the existing world and championship records were as follows.

World record	Karen Moe (USA)	2:15.57	Munich, West Germany	4 September 1972
Competition record	N/A	N/A	N/A	N/A

The following records were established during the competition:

Date	Event	Name	Nationality	Time	Record
8 September	Heat	Nina MacInnis	United States	2:23.870	CR
8 September	Heat	Sandra Yost	Australia	2:21.825	CR
8 September	Heat	Roswitha Beier	East Germany	2:18.876	CR
8 September	Heat	Rosemarie Kother	East Germany	2:15.455	WR
8 September	Final	Rosemarie Kother	East Germany	2:13.766	WR

== Results ==
=== Heats ===
27 swimmers participated in 4 heats.

Rank	Heat	Lane	Name	Nationality	Time	Notes
1	4	-	Rosemarie Kother	East Germany	2:15.455	Q, WR
2	3	-	Roswitha Beier	East Germany	2:18.876	Q, CR
3	3	-	Lynn Colella	United States	2:20.363	Q
4	2	-	Sandra Yost	Australia	2:21.825	Q, CR
5	4	-	José Damen	Netherlands	2:23.604	Q
6	1	-	Nina MacInnis	United States	2:23.870	Q, CR
7	4	-	Uta Schütz	West Germany	2:24.537	Q
8	1	-	Yolanda Aggenbach	Netherlands	2:24.595	Q
9	2	-	Aleksandra Meerzon	Soviet Union	2:24.791	
10	3	-	Patti Stenhouse	Canada	2:25.304	
11	3	-	Gail Neall	Australia	2:25.818	
12	2	-	Anca Groza	Romania	2:27.220	
13	1	-	Nataliya Popova	Soviet Union	2:27.269	
14	2	-	Gunilla Andersson	Sweden	2:28.030	
15	3	-	E. Majnaric	Yugoslavia	2:28.580	
16	2	-	Vera Faitlova	Czechoslovakia	2:29.727	
17	1	-	M. Saavedra	Colombia	2:29.835	
18	4	-	M. Corsi	Italy	2:29.955	
19	1	-	Ileana Morales	Venezuela	2:30.181	
20	2	-	Roselina Angel	Colombia	2:30.884	
21	2	-	Gisela Cerezo	Venezuela	2:30.977	
22	1	-	Aurora Chamorro	Spain	2:32.436	
23	4	-	Jennifer McHugh	Canada	2:32.903	
24	3	-	María Mock	Puerto Rico	2:37.098	
25	3	-	A. Valentini	Italy	2:38.930	
26	4	-	K. Tevajarvi	Finland	-	DNS / DQ
27	4	-	Mayumi Aoki	Japan	-	DNS / DQ

=== Final ===
The results of the final are below.

Rank	Lane	Name	Nationality	Time	Notes
1st place, gold medalist(s)	4	Rosemarie Kother	East Germany	2:13.766	WR
2nd place, silver medalist(s)	5	Roswitha Beier	East Germany	2:16.777	
3rd place, bronze medalist(s)	3	Lynn Colella	United States	2:19.535	
4	2	José Damen	Netherlands	2:21.964	
5	6	Sandra Yost	Australia	2:22.323	
6	7	Nina MacInnis	United States	2:22.570	
7	1	Uta Schütz	West Germany	2:23.508	
8	8	Yolanda Aggenbach	Netherlands	2:25.689	
