= Swimming at the 1973 World Aquatics Championships – Men's 4 × 100 metre medley relay =

Men's 4 × 100 metre medley relay at the 1973 World Aquatics Championships
- Dates: September 9, 1973
- Nations: 15
- Winning time: 3:49.491 CR

Medalists
gold medal	Mike Stamm; John Hencken; Joe Bottom; Jim Montgomery	United States
silver medal	Roland Matthes; Jürgen Glas; Hartmut Flöckner; Roger Pyttel	East Germany
bronze medal	Ian MacKenzie; Peter Hrdlitschka; Bruce Robertson; Brian Phillips	Canada

The men's 4 × 100 metre medley relay competition of the swimming events at the 1973 World Aquatics Championships took place on September 9.

== Records ==
Prior to the competition, the existing world and championship records were as follows.

World record	United States (USA); Mike Stamm; Tom Bruce; Mark Spitz; Jerry Heidenreich	3:48.16	Munich, West Germany	4 September 1972
Competition record	N/A	N/A	N/A	N/A

The following records were established during the competition:

Date	Event	Nation	Athletes	Time	Record
9 September	Heat	United States		3:54.914	CR
9 September	Final	United States	Mike Stamm; John Hencken; Joe Bottom; Jim Montgomery	3:49.491	CR

== Results ==
=== Heats ===
15 teams participated in 2 heats.

Rank	Heat	Lane	Nation	Athletes	Time	Notes
1	1	-	United States		3:54.914	Q, CR
2	1	-	East Germany		3:57.133	Q
3	1	-	West Germany		3:58.034	Q
4	2	-	Soviet Union		4:00.011	Q
5	2	-	Canada		4:00.351	Q
6	2	-	Great Britain		4:00.855	Q
7	1	-	Hungary		4:01.119	Q
8	2	-	Australia		4:02.970	Q
9	2	-	Brazil		4:04.098	
10	1	-	Spain		4:04.358	
11	2	-	Yugoslavia		4:04.814	
12	2	-	Italy		4:09.074	
13	1	-	Puerto Rico		4:09.799	
14	1	-	Bulgaria		4:14.632	
15	1	-	Sweden		-	DNS / DQ

=== Final ===
The results of the final are below.

Rank	Lane	Nation	Athletes	Time	Notes
1st place, gold medalist(s)	4	United States	Mike Stamm; John Hencken; Joe Bottom; Jim Montgomery	3:49.491	CR
2nd place, silver medalist(s)	5	East Germany	Roland Matthes; Jürgen Glas; Hartmut Flöckner; Roger Pyttel	3:53.246	
3rd place, bronze medalist(s)	2	Canada	Ian MacKenzie; Peter Hrdlitschka; Bruce Robertson; Brian Phillips	3:56.372	
4	3	West Germany	Klaus Steinbach; Walter Kusch; Folkert Meeuw; Peter Nocke	3:56.389	
5	6	Soviet Union	Igor Grivennikov; Mikhail Khryukin; Sergey Zakharov; Vladimir Bure	3:58.098	
6	8	Australia	Brad Cooper; Michael Creswick; Ross Seymour; Michael Wenden	3:58.590	
7	7	Great Britain	Colin Cunningham; David Wilkie; Martin Edwards; Brian Brinkley	3:59.048	
8	1	Hungary	László Cseh; Sándor Szabó; Zoltán Verrasztó; István Szentirmay	4:01.642	
