= Swimming at the 1972 Summer Olympics – Women's 100 metre butterfly =

Women's 100 metre butterfly at the Games of the XX Olympiad
- Venue: Olympia Schwimmhalle
- Date: 31 August 1972 (heats & semifinals); 1 September 1972 (final)
- Competitors: 30 from 21 nations
- Winning time: 1:03.34 WR

Medalists
1st place, gold medalist(s)		Mayumi Aoki	Japan
2nd place, silver medalist(s)		Roswitha Beier	East Germany
3rd place, bronze medalist(s)		Andrea Gyarmati	Hungary

The women's 100 metre butterfly event at the 1972 Olympic Games took place between August 31 and September 1. This swimming event used the butterfly stroke. Because an Olympic size swimming pool is 50 metres long, this race consisted of two lengths of the pool.

== Results ==
=== Heats ===
Heat 1

Rank	Athlete	Country	Time	Notes
1	Dana Shrader	United States	1:05.09	Q
2	Edeltraud Koch	West Germany	1:05.29	Q
3	Frieke Buys	Netherlands	1:06.89	Q
4	Margrit Thomet	Switzerland	1:07.28	Q
5	Brenda McGrory	Ireland	1:08.52	
6	Donatella Talpo-Schiavon	Italy	1:08.98	
7	Susan Smith	Canada	1:09.38	
8	Norma Amezcua	Mexico	1:12.23	

Heat 2

Rank	Athlete	Country	Time	Notes
1	Andrea Gyarmati	Hungary	1:04.01	OR, Q
2	Roswitha Beier	East Germany	1:04.34	Q
3	Eva Wikner	Sweden	1:06.70	Q
4	Iryna Ustymenko	Soviet Union	1:07.44	Q
5	Aurora Chamorro	Spain	1:08.39	
6	Leslie Cliff	Canada	1:09.29	
7	Hsu Yue-yun	Chinese Taipei	1:11.67	

Heat 3

Rank	Athlete	Country	Time	Notes
1	Deena Deardurff	United States	1:04.80	Q
2	Rosemarie Kother-Gabriel	East Germany	1:04.83	Q
3	Noriko Asano	Japan	1:04.97	Q
4	Sue Funch	Australia	1:07.51	
5	Jean Jeavons	Great Britain	1:07.64	
6	Věra Faitlová	Czechoslovakia	1:08.18	
7	Tay Chin Joo	Singapore	1:10.92	
8	Susana Saxlund	Uruguay	1:11.90	

Heat 4

Rank	Athlete	Country	Time	Notes
1	Mayumi Aoki	Japan	1:04.00	OR, Q
2	Ellie Daniel	United States	1:04.33	Q
3	Gudrun Beckmann	West Germany	1:05.26	Q
4	Heike Nagel	West Germany	1:05.64	Q
5	Marilyn Corson	Canada	1:06.26	Q
6	Judit Turóczy	Hungary	1:09.73	
7	Ileana Morales	Venezuela	1:10.37	

=== Semifinals ===
Heat 1

Rank	Athlete	Country	Time	Notes
1	Andrea Gyarmati	Hungary	1:03.80	Q, WR
2	Roswitha Beier	East Germany	1:04.36	Q
3	Dana Shrader	United States	1:04.54	Q
4	Rosemarie Kother	East Germany	1:04.64	
5	Edeltraud Koch	West Germany	1:05.28	
6	Frieke Buys	Netherlands	1:06.78	
7	Marilyn Corson	Canada	1:06.78	
8	Iryna Ustymenko	Soviet Union	1:07.76	

Heat 2

Rank	Athlete	Country	Time	Notes
1	Deena Deardurff	United States	1:03.97	Q
2	Mayumi Aoki	Japan	1:04.11	Q
3	Ellie Daniel	United States	1:04.25	Q
4	Gudrun Beckmann	West Germany	1:04.52	Q
5	Noriko Asano	Japan	1:04.53	Q
6	Heike Hustede	West Germany	1:06.48	
7	Margrit Thomet	Switzerland	1:07.12	
8	Eva Wikner	Sweden	1:07.53	

=== Final ===
Rank	Athlete	Country	Time	Notes
1	Mayumi Aoki	Japan	1:03.34	WR
2	Roswitha Beier	East Germany	1:03.61	
3	Andrea Gyarmati	Hungary	1:03.73	
4	Deena Deardurff	United States	1:03.95	
5	Dana Shrader	United States	1:03.98	
6	Ellie Daniel	United States	1:04.08	
7	Gudrun Beckmann	West Germany	1:04.15	
8	Noriko Asano	Japan	1:04.25	

Key: OR = Olympic record
