= Swimming at the 1973 World Aquatics Championships – Women's 400 metre individual medley =

Women's 400 metre individual medley at the 1973 World Aquatics Championships
- Dates: September 6, 1973
- Competitors: 27 from 20 nations
- Winning time: 4:57.51 WR

Medalists
gold medal	Gudrun Wegner	East Germany
silver medal	Angela Franke	East Germany
bronze medal	Novella Calligaris	Italy

The women's 400 metre individual medley competition of the swimming events at the 1973 World Aquatics Championships took place on September 6.

== Records ==
Prior to the competition, the existing world and championship records were as follows.

World record	Angela Franke (GDR)	5:01.10	Utrecht, Netherlands	18 August 1973
Competition record	N/A	N/A	N/A	N/A

The following records were established during the competition:

Date	Event	Name	Nationality	Time	Record
6 September	Heat	Susan Hunter	New Zealand	5:08.36	CR
6 September	Heat	Gudrun Wegner	East Germany	5:04.03	CR
6 September	Final	Angela Franke	East Germany	4:57.51	WR

== Results ==
=== Heats ===
27 swimmers participated in 4 heats.

Rank	Heat	Lane	Name	Nationality	Time	Notes
1	2	-	Gudrun Wegner	East Germany	5:04.03	Q, CR
2	3	-	Novella Calligaris	Italy	5:05.46	Q
3	4	-	Angela Franke	East Germany	5:05.89	Q
4	1	-	Susan Hunter	New Zealand	5:08.36	Q, CR
5	2	-	Terry Potts	United States	5:09.03	Q
6	1	-	Leslie Cliff	Canada	5:10.09	Q
7	4	-	Jenny Bartz	United States	5:10.75	Q
8	3	-	José Damen	Netherlands	5:12.17	Q
9	2	-	Uta Schütz	West Germany	5:13.41	
10	2	-	Susan Richardson	Great Britain	5:13.887	NR
11	1	-	Yukari Takemoto	Japan	5:14.00	
12	1	-	Anita Zarnowiecki	Sweden	5:15.18	
13	4	-	Marina Malyutina	Soviet Union	5:17.05	
14	4	-	Gail Neall	Australia	5:17.96	
15	4	-	Paola Morozzi	Italy	5:19.41	
16	3	-	Jennifer McHugh	Canada	5:21.26	
17	4	-	Gisela Cerezo	Venezuela	5:24.61	
18	4	-	Naoko Shio	Japan	5:25.04	
19	3	-	T. Skvortsova	Soviet Union	5:25.70	
20	3	-	Roselina Angel	Colombia	5:25.84	
21	1	-	Eleni Avlanitou	Greece	5:32.21	
22	2	-	Maria Isabel Guerra	Brazil	5:34.58	
23	2	-	G. Borras	Argentina	5:39.11	
24	2	-	María Mock	Puerto Rico	5:42.73	
25	1	-	Myriam Mizouni	Tunisia	5:48.12	
26	1	-	Angela López	Puerto Rico	5:51.89	
27	3	-	K. Tevajarvi	Finland		DNS / DSQ

=== Final ===
Rank	Lane	Name	Nationality	Time	Notes
1st place, gold medalist(s)	-	Gudrun Wegner	East Germany	4:57.51	WR
2nd place, silver medalist(s)	-	Angela Franke	East Germany	5:00.37	
3rd place, bronze medalist(s)	-	Novella Calligaris	Italy	5:02.02	
4	-	Leslie Cliff	Canada	5:07.01	
5	-	Terry Potts	United States	5:09.90	
6	-	Susan Hunter	New Zealand	5:10.28	
7	-	Jenny Bartz	United States	5:10.45	
8	-	José Damen	Netherlands	5:15.66	
