= Carlos González =

Carlos González may refer to:

== Politics ==
- Carlos González (American politician), U.S. politician from Massachusetts
- Carlos González Cepeda (1949–2025), Spanish businessman and politician
- Carlos González Espinoza (born 1926), Chilean architect and politician
- Carlos González Utreras (1917–2003), Chilean journalist and politician
- Carlos Hank González (1927–2001), Mexican politician and businessman
- Carlos Joaquín González (born 1965), Mexican politician
- Carlos Zatarain González (born 1961), Mexican politician

== Sports ==
=== Football ===
- Carlos Gonzales (footballer, born 1945), Peruvian football forward
- Carlos Gonzales (footballer, born 1989), Peruvian football forward
- Carlos González (footballer, born 1935), Mexican football forward
- Carlos González (footballer, born 1960), Chilean football manager and former player
- Carlos González (footballer, born 1963), Argentine football midfielder
- Carlos González (footballer, born 1973), Mexican football midfielder
- Carlos González (footballer, born 1976), Paraguayan football midfielder
- Carlos González (footballer, born 1977), Mexican football defender and manager
- Carlos González (footballer, born 1986), Paraguayan football striker
- Carlos González (football manager) (born 1986), Spanish football manager
- Carlos González (footballer, born 1993), Paraguayan football forward
- Carlos González (footballer, born 1997), Spanish football midfielder

=== Other sports ===
- Carlos González (basketball) (born 1930), Uruguayan
- Carlos González (swimmer) (born 1955), Panamanian Olympic swimmer
- Carlos González (boxer, born 1959), Mexican featherweight
- Carlos González (boxer, born 1972), Mexican welterweight
- Carlos González (baseball) (born 1985), from Venezuela

== Other ==
- Carlos Hank González (businessman, born 1971), Mexican businessman and banker
- Carlos González (cinematographer), American cinematographer and director
- Carlos Bernardo González Pecotche (1901–1963), Argentine humanist and thinker
- Carlos Canseco González (1921–2009), Mexican physician and philanthropist
- Carlos González Cruchaga (1921–2008), Chilean bishop
- Carlos González Nova (1917–2009), Mexican businessman

== See also ==
- Estadio Carlos González, or Estadio Banorte, a stadium in the Mexican state of Sinaloa
- Charles González Palisa (1942 – 2024), Paraguayan radio and television presenter
