= Swimming at the 1973 World Aquatics Championships – Men's 4 × 100 metre freestyle relay =

Men's 4 × 100 metre freestyle relay at the 1973 World Aquatics Championships
- Dates: September 5, 1973
- Nations: 14
- Winning time: 3:27.183 CR

Medalists
gold medal	Melvin Nash; Joe Bottom; Jim Montgomery; John Murphy	United States
silver medal	Igor Grivennikov; Viktor Aboimov; Vladimir Krivtsov; Vladimir Bure	Soviet Union
bronze medal	Roland Matthes; Roger Pyttel; Peter Bruch; Hartmut Flöckner	East Germany

The men's 4 × 100 metre freestyle relay competition of the swimming events at the 1973 World Aquatics Championships took place on September 5.

== Records ==
Prior to the competition, the existing world and championship records were as follows.

World record	United States (USA); David Edgar (52.69); John Murphy (52.04); Jerry Heidenreich (50.78); Mark Spitz (50.90)	3:26.42	Munich, West Germany	28 August 1972
Competition record	N/A	N/A	N/A	N/A

The following records were established during the competition:

Date	Event	Nation	Athletes	Time	Record
5 September	Heat	France	Michel Rousseau (51.73)	3:35.575	CR
5 September	Heat	United States	Bill Miller (53.39); Stan Carper (53.42); Kurt Krumpholz (52.50); Rick Klatt (53.13)	3:32.442	CR
5 September	Final	United States	Melvin Nash (52.65); Joe Bottom (51.42); Jim Montgomery (51.17); John Murphy (51.94)	3:27.183	CR

== Results ==
=== Heats ===
14 teams participated in 2 heats.

Rank	Heat	Lane	Nation	Athletes	Time	Notes
1	2	-	United States	Bill Miller (53.39); Stan Carper (53.42); Kurt Krumpholz (52.50); Rick Klatt (53.13)	3:32.442	Q, CR
2	2	-	East Germany		3:33.837	Q
3	2	-	Soviet Union		3:34.700	Q
4	2	-	Brazil		3:35.256	Q
5	1	-	France	Michel Rousseau (51.73)	3:35.575	Q, CR
6	2	-	Italy		3:35.655	Q
7	1	-	West Germany		3:35.882	Q
8	1	-	Australia	Michael Wenden (52.61); Steve Badger (54.98); Neil Rogers (54.50); John Kulasalu (54.47)	3:36.566	Q, NR
9	1	-	Canada		3:36.915	
10	2	-	Spain		3:37.686	
11	2	-	Romania		3:39.171	
12	1	-	Yugoslavia		3:42.949	
13	1	-	Puerto Rico		3:48.080	
	1	-	Sweden			DSQ

=== Final ===
The results of the final are below.

Rank	Lane	Nation	Athletes	Time	Notes
1st place, gold medalist(s)	4	United States	Melvin Nash (52.65); Joe Bottom (51.42); Jim Montgomery (51.17); John Murphy (51.94)	3:27.183	CR
2nd place, silver medalist(s)	3	Soviet Union	Igor Grivennikov (53.36); Viktor Aboimov (52.97); Vladimir Krivtsov (52.68); Vladimir Bure (52.35)	3:31.367	
3rd place, bronze medalist(s)	5	East Germany	Roland Matthes (53.86); Roger Pyttel (52.37); Peter Bruch (52.84); Hartmut Flöckner (52.96)	3:32.031	
4	1	West Germany	Klaus Steinbach (52.67); Peter Nocke (53.13); Gerhard Schiller (53.43); P. Labudde (54.10)	3:33.336	
5	6	Brazil	Ruy de Oliveira (53.77); José Namorado (53.30); Jim Adams (53.69); José Aranha (52.63)	3:33.392	
6	8	Australia	Michael Wenden (52.83); Steve Badger (54.29); Neil Rogers (54.16); John Kulasalu (53.99)	3:35.274	
7	7	Italy	Roberto Pangaro (54.06); Alberto Castagnetti (55.53); Paolo Barelli (53.63); Marcello Guarducci (53.62)	3:36.842	
8	2	France	Patrick Juge (55.96); Pierre-Yves Copin (54.79); André Foucart (56.20); Alain Hermitte (54.31)	3:41.267	
