= Ustymenko =

Ustymenko or Ustimenko (Ukrainian: Устименко) is a Ukrainian surname. Notable people with the surname include:

- Danil Ustimenko (born 2000), Kazakhstani footballer
- Denys Ustymenko (born 1999), Ukrainian footballer
- Iryna Ustymenko (born 1957), Ukrainian swimmer
- Lena Ustymenko (born 1986), Ukrainian volleyball player
- Maksym Ustymenko, Ukrainian fighter pilot (1993–2025)
