= Bill Forrester =

American swimmer (born 1957)

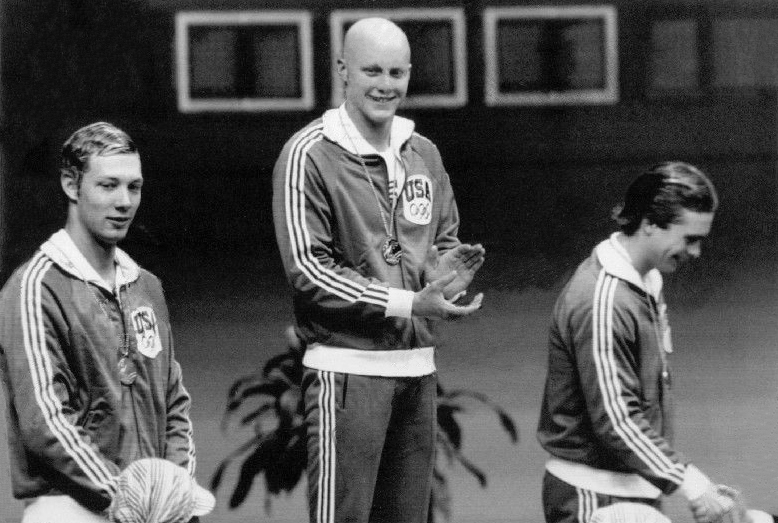
- Gregg, Bruner and Forrester (far right) at the 1976 Montreal Olympics

Personal information
- Full name: William Ronald Forrester Jr.
- National team: United States
- Born: December 18, 1957 (age 68) Darby, Pennsylvania, U.S.
- Height: 5 ft 11 in (1.80 m)
- Weight: 174 lb (79 kg)

Sport
- Sport: Swimming
- Strokes: Butterfly, freestyle
- Club: Randy Reese Swim Club
- College team: Auburn University
- Coach: Randy Reese (Jacksonville Episcopal High); Eddie Reese (Auburn); Richard Quick (Auburn)
Medal record
Representing the United States
Olympic Games
Bronze medal – third place	1976 Montreal	200 m butterfly
World Championships – Long course
Gold medal – first place	1975 Cali	200 m butterfly
Gold medal – first place	1978 West Berlin	200 m freestyle
Gold medal – first place	1978 West Berlin	4×200 m freestyle
Bronze medal – third place	1975 Cali	100 m butterfly
Bronze medal – third place	1978 West Berlin	400 m freestyle

William Ronald Forrester Jr. (born December 18, 1957) is an American former competition swimmer, who swam for Auburn University, a July, 1976 Montreal Olympic medalist in the 200-meter butterfly, and a former world record-holder. Forrester won three gold and two bronze medals at the world championships in 1975 and 1978. After retiring from swim competition, he worked as an age-group coach for over 30 years, first coaching in a summer league, and then founding the Georgia Coastal Aquatic Team (GCAT) in 1994.

== High school era swimming ==
Bill Forrester was born December 18, 1957, in Darby, Pennsylvania. Forrester had an early start as a competitive swimmer beginning as a competitive diver at age seven, but then switched to competitive swimming at eight. He later swam for Birmingham, Alabama's Woodlawn High in his Freshman and Sophomore years.

Looking for a more competitive swim program, at the age of 17 he relocated to the Jacksonville, Florida area, transferred schools, and swam for Jacksonville Episcopal High in Jacksonville, Florida, now known as Episcopal School of Jacksonville, where he was trained and managed by Hall of Fame swim Coach Randy Reese. Reese's program included highly competitive training and in addition to long swimming workouts featured running, and resistance training for flexibility. While still representing Jacksonville Episcopal, he won the AAU 200 meter butterfly in American Athletic Union competition at the AAU World Trials in Long Beach, California in June, 1975 with a time of 2.00.79. By June 1975, Forrester, while still a student at Jacksonville Episcopal, had received National Interscholastic Swimming Coaches Association (NISCA) Prep School All American honors on two relays and individual honors in the 200 free with a 1:42.8, 200 IM with a 1:56.2, 100 fly with a 50.5, 100 free with a 47.00, 500 free with a 4:35.6, and 100 backstroke with a 53.3. Swimming in the All Southern Boy's competition of swimmers from 12 Southern States around his Junior Year in 1976 at Jacksonville Episcopal, he won the 200 freestyle, and 100 butterfly with a time of 20.24, also swimming on Episcopal's winning medley and free relay teams.

== 1976 Montreal Olympic bronze ==
Rated very high in the event at the 1976 Olympic trails, Forrester placed second in the 200-meter butterfly by only .03 seconds to Stanford University sophomore swimmer Mike Bruner.

The summer after graduating High School, he represented the United States as an 18-year-old at the 1976 Summer Olympics in Montreal, Quebec, where he won a bronze medal in the 200-meter butterfly, finishing behind U.S. teammates Mike Bruner who took the gold and Steve Gregg who took the silver medal. In a close finish, Forrester swam a 1:59.96, less than a second behind the times of either Bruner or Greg. Forrester did not break into the top three swimmers until after the 150-meter mark, three fourths of the way into the 200-meter race. He passed East German swimmer Roger Pyttel after the 150-meter mark, finishing only .06 seconds ahead before him.

=== World Championships ===
At the 1975 long course World Championships in Cali, he won a gold in the 200-meter butterfly, and a bronze in the 100-meter butterfly. Forrester was part of a U.S. team at 1978 World Championships that set a long-course world record in the 4x200 freestyle relay of 7:20.82 on August 24, 1978, in West-Berlin, Germany that held until August 23, 1983. At the 1978 World Championships, he also won a golds in the 200-meter freestyle and a bronze in the 400-meter freestyle.

=== Auburn University ===
Forrester graduated from Auburn University in 1980 where he swam for Hall of Fame Coach Eddie Reese through 1978, and then for Hall of Fame Coach Richard Quick through 1980. He had considered a transfer to Florida when Reese left, but decided to remain at Auburn, and did not regret his decision. In his Freshman year at Auburn, he set the American record in the 200 butterfly with a time of 1:46.25 in Southeastern Conference competition. He would win the AAU 200 meter butterfly in 1976. In 1978, Forrester helped lead Auburn to a second-place finish in both the SEC Championships and the NCAA championships, where the University of Tennessee took first.

A very talented team, 1984 Olympic triple gold medalist Rowdy Gaines was one of Auburn's top swimmers while Forrester swam for the school. On March 7, 1980, Forrester swam with Gaines on a winning 880 freestyle relay at the Southeastern Conference Championship, where the Auburn team clocked a combined time of 6:34.34. The win led Auburn to a second-place finish in the 1980 SEC Championship, only three points behind Florida, the American's top rated teams, giving them their second successive SEC championship.

=== Coaching swimming ===
After college, Forrestor relocated to coastal Hilton Head, South Carolina to live closer to his family, then moved and settled around 20 miles Southeast to Savannah, Georgia. In 1994, after gaining experience from coaching in a summer league, he created the Georgia Coastal Aquatic Team in greater Savannah, known as GCAT. As head coach for the year-round team, he manages age group swimmers from the wide span of 5–18. While coaching for GCAT, he trained a young Billy Jamerson, a Georgia State individual champion in the 100 yard breaststroke, and only a few seconds shy of qualifying for the Olympic trials in the 100-meter breast. A twenty-year coach by 2016, several of his swimmers had qualified to swim in the Olympic trials, but had not yet been chosen for the U.S. team. In 2025, the team met at Chatham County Aquatic Center in Savannah, and at the Outdoor pool at Richmond Hill Swim Club, about roughly 20 miles Southeast.

=== Honors ===
Forrester is a member of the Pennsylvania Aquatics Hall of Fame.

== See also ==
- List of Auburn University people
- List of Olympic medalists in swimming (men)
- List of World Aquatics Championships medalists in swimming (men)
- World record progression 4 × 200 metres freestyle relay
