= Joe Bottom =

American swimmer (born 1955)

Personal information
- Full name: Joseph Stuart Bottom
- Nickname: "Joe"
- National team: United States
- Born: April 18, 1955 (age 71) Akron, Ohio, U.S.
- Height: 6 ft 5 in (1.96 m)
- Weight: 192 lb (87 kg)

Sport
- Sport: Swimming
- Strokes: Butterfly, freestyle
- Club: Santa Clara Swim Club
- College team: University of Southern California
Medal record
Men's swimming
Representing the United States
Olympic Games
Silver medal – second place	1976 Montreal	100 m butterfly
World Championships (LC)
Gold medal – first place	1973 Belgrade	4×100 m freestyle
Gold medal – first place	1973 Belgrade	4×100 m medley
Gold medal – first place	1978 Berlin	100 m butterfly
Gold medal – first place	1978 Berlin	4×100 m medley
Silver medal – second place	1973 Belgrade	100 m butterfly

Joseph Stuart Bottom (born April 18, 1955) is an American former competition swimmer, Olympic silver medalist, and former world record-holder in the 50-meter freestyle, 100-meter butterfly and 4×100-meter freestyle relay.

Born in Akron, Ohio, Bottom moved with his family at age 11 to Santa Clara, California, where he was a member of the Santa Clara Swim Club under noted swim coach George Haines. He attended Santa Clara High School, where he contributed to the Panthers numerous California Interscholastic Federation – Central Coast Section championships and set several Section records from 1971–73.

Bottom attended the University of Southern California (USC), where he was an All-American swimmer for the USC Trojans swimming and diving team from 1974 to 1977. He graduated in 1977 with a bachelor of science degree in electrical engineering and was a member of Eta Kappa Nu and Tau Beta Pi. In 1977, he was the first swimmer ever to crack 20 seconds in the 50-yard freestyle, at 19.70. He held USC's record for 50-yard freestyle until the 2006–2007 season, and has the third fastest 100-yard freestyle and sixth-fastest 100-yard butterfly times in school history. He won five NCAA individual and 4 relay titles with the Trojans. He was the captain of the 1977 Trojans swim team. Known for an easygoing personality, Bottom was a fierce competitor during meets.

At the 1976 Summer Olympics in Montreal, Bottom won the silver medal in the 100-meter butterfly and came in sixth in the 100-meter freestyle. He also won a gold medal as a member of the 4×100-meter medley relay team, swimming in the qualifying round. At the prime of his career, he was unable to compete at the 1980 Summer Olympics in Moscow due to the U.S. boycott.

During the inaugural, 1973 World Aquatics Championships in Belgrade, Bottom took silver in the 100-meter butterfly and gold in both the 4×100-meter freestyle and 4×100-meter medley relay events. At the 1978 World Championships in Berlin he took gold in the 100-meter butterfly as well as the 4×100-meter medley relay. He won nine U.S. national championships between 1974 and 1980.

On August 27, 1977, at the East Germany-United States dual meet in East Berlin, Bottom broke Mark Spitz's five-year-old 100-meter butterfly world record with a time of 54.18 seconds. The night before the record-setting race, Bottom suffered from insomnia and took a sleeping pill only to oversleep and miss his usual pre-race warmup swim; incredibly, he broke Spitz's record anyway. He was also a part of the team that set the new 4×100-meter freestyle relay world record on September 1, 1974.

In 2007, Bottom was inducted into the USC Athletic Hall of Fame; several of his records set at USC remain unbroken. He was inducted into the International Swimming Hall of Fame in 2006.

Bottom currently resides in Chico, California, where he is a management consultant and serving as Senior Manager in Accenture's Marketing Sciences Practice within the Retail Products Industry. His younger brother, Mike Bottom, also swam at USC where he was a three-time All-American (1975–77); Mike is currently one of the world's top sprint coaches and coaches the University of Michigan swim team.

== See also ==
- List of Olympic medalists in swimming (men)
- List of University of Southern California people
- List of World Aquatics Championships medalists in swimming (men)
- World record progression 50 metres freestyle
- World record progression 100 metres butterfly
- World record progression 4 × 100 metres freestyle relay
- World record progression 4 × 100 metres medley relay

Records
Preceded by Jonty Skinner	Men's 50-meter freestyle world record-holder (long course); July 3, 1977 – July 29, 1978	Succeeded by Ron Manganiello
Preceded by Mark Spitz	Men's 100-meter butterfly world record-holder (long course); August 27, 1977 – April 11, 1980	Succeeded by Pär Arvidsson
Preceded by Bruce Stahl	Men's 50-meter freestyle world record-holder (long course); August 15, 1980 – August 15, 1981	Succeeded by Robin Leamy
