= Peter Bruch =

German swimmer (born 1955)

Personal information
- Full name: Peter Bruch
- Nationality: German
- Born: 25 September 1955 (age 70) Berlin, Germany

Sport
- Sport: Swimming
- Strokes: Freestyle
Medal record
Men's swimming
Representing East Germany
Olympic Games
Bronze medal – third place	1972 Munich	4×100 m freestyle
World Championships
Bronze medal – third place	1973 Belgrade	4×100 m freestyle

Peter Bruch (born 25 September 1955) is a German former swimmer who competed in the 1972 Summer Olympics.
