= Riccardo Urbani =

Italian swimmer

Personal information
- Born: 11 September 1958 (age 67) Rome, Italy

Sport
- Sport: Swimming

Riccardo Urbani (born 11 September 1958) is an Italian former swimmer. He competed in the men's 100 metre butterfly at the 1976 Summer Olympics.
