= Konstantinos Koskinas =

Greek swimmer

Personal information
- Born: 31 October 1954 (age 71)

Sport
- Sport: Swimming

Konstantinos Koskinas (born 31 October 1954) is a Greek former swimmer. He competed in the men's 100 metre butterfly at the 1976 Summer Olympics.
