= Susan Barnard =

British swimmer

Personal information
- Born: 18 January 1961 (age 65)

Sport
- Sport: Swimming

Susan Barnard (born 18 January 1961) is a British former swimmer. She competed in two events at the 1976 Summer Olympics. The 1976 British Olympic team for the Women's 200 m freestyle - Swimming event included Susan Edmondson, Ann Bradshaw and Barnard.

She also won the 1975 ASA National Championship 100 metres freestyle title and the 200 metres freestyle.
