= Steve Gregg =

American swimmer (1955–2024)

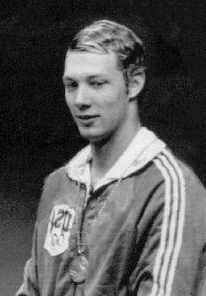
- Gregg at the 1976 Olympics

Personal information
- Full name: Steven Garrett Gregg
- Nickname: "Steve"
- National team: United States
- Born: November 3, 1955 Wilmington, Delaware, U.S.
- Died: September 11, 2024 (aged 68)
- Height: 6 ft 4 in (1.93 m)
- Weight: 185 lb (84 kg)

Sport
- Sport: Swimming
- Strokes: Butterfly
- Club: Wilmington Swim School; Southern California Aquatic Club
- College team: North Carolina State University
- Coach: Bob Mattson (Wilmington Swim Club); Don Easterling (NC State)
Medal record
Representing the United States
Olympic Games
Silver medal – second place	1976 Montreal	200 m butterfly
World Championships (LC)
Silver medal – second place	1973 Belgrade	200 m butterfly
Silver medal – second place	1978 Berlin	200 m butterfly
Pan American Games
Silver medal – second place	1975 Mexico City	200 m butterfly

Steven Garrett Gregg (November 3, 1955 – September 11, 2024) was an American competition swimmer. He won silver medals in the 200 m butterfly event at the 1976 Olympics, 1975 Pan American Games, and 1973 and 1978 world championships. After graduating from North Carolina State University, he defended a PhD in exercise biochemistry and physiology at University of California, Berkeley, and eventually settled in the Chicago area with his family.

== Early swimming ==
Gregg was born on November 3, 1955, in Wilmington, Delaware, and attended the private college-prep Tatnall School in New Castle County, Delaware, outside Wilmington. He first took to the water at five and began swimming competitively around the age of 9, attending the Wilmington Swim School under exceptional Coach Bob Mattson. In his days as a competitive swimmer, Coach Mattson had captained the North Carolina State Swimming team, where Gregg would later excel as a swimmer.

Winning events as a Sophomore underclassman, he took a first in the 500 freestyle and a second and third in the 100 freestyle and 100 butterfly at the Delaware State Swimming Championships in December 1970, which took place at the Wilmington Swim School. While a High School Junior at Tatnall, Gregg set a meet record in the 200 freestyle at the Winter Delaware State Swim Meet held at the Wilmington Swim School with a time of 1:50.22 in December 1971. At the same meet, he won the 500 freestyle with a meet record time of 4:56.059.

=== 100-meter national record ===
Gregg circa '73

In March 1973, during his Senior year at Tatnal, continuing to swim for the Wilmington Athletic Club (Wilmington Swim School), he broke Mark Spitz's 1966 National Record for the 100-meter butterfly with a 52.05 in the Middle Atlantic Junior Olympics, and also set meet records in the 200-meter freestyle and the 200-meter individual medley.

== North Carolina State ==
In August 1973, immediately before his Freshman year at North Carolina State, he won the 200-meter butterfly at the AAU National meet in Louisville, Kentucky, with a personal best 2:04.11, upsetting 1972 Olympian Robin Backhouse by .4 seconds. As a result of Gregg's win, he was selected to swim for the U.S. in the Aquatic World Championships in Belgrade in September. At the L.A. Invitational Swim Meet in Mission Viejo, California, Gregg placed second in the 200-meter fly with a 2:06.17 in August 1973, though the first place finisher Jorge Delgado swam the event in 2:04.38, the fastest time in the world that year, though not a new world record.

Gregg was the first NC State athlete to become an All American four years in a row, winning the honor consecutively from 1974-1977. Swimming for Coach Don Easterling, he captured a national championship in the 200 Butterfly in 1976 and was an ACC champion six times during his four years at NC State. He acquired his ACC championships four times in the 200 butterfly from 1974–77, once in the 100 butterfly in 1975 and once in the 500 freestyle in 1974.

NC State placed in the Top 10 two times during Gregg's tenure with the team, gaining a seventh place finish in 1974 and a sixth place finish in 1976.

== 1976 Montreal Olympics ==
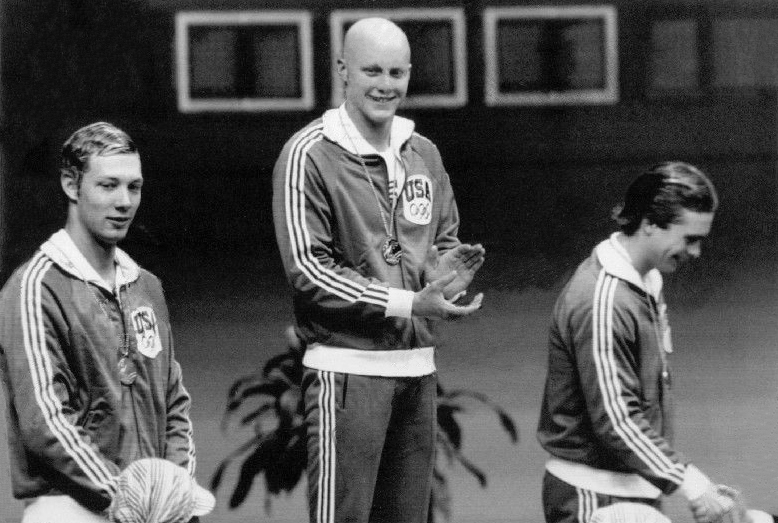
'76 Olympic Podium, (l to r), S. Gregg, M. Bruner, B. Forrester

His time in the 1976 Montreal Olympics for his silver medal in the 200-meter butterfly was 1:59.54. Gregg finished second to Mike Bruner, whose 1:59.23 broke the World Record of 1:59.63 of Germany's Roger Pyttel set a month earlier. Gregg also finished under Pyttel's old world record. Americans Mike Bruner, Gregg, and Bill Forrester swept the event, with very close finishes, edging out Pyttel, a close fourth, and only .06 seconds out of medal contention. Though he was fifth halfway at the 100-meter mark, Gregg was a strong finisher and closed well to touch second at the end of the 200 event. Gregg had swum well in the morning preliminaries setting an Olympic record in the 200-meter fly of 2:00.24, but the finals times were quite fast, and his record held only nine hours.

== 1973, 1978 World Aquatics Championships ==
Gregg took a silver in the 200-meter butterfly at the September 1973 World Aquatics Championships in Belgrade, Yugoslavia, with a time of 2:03.58, just .26 seconds behind American Olympian Robin Bakhaus, who he had upset in the event in the AAU Nationals a few weeks earlier. In the August 1978 World Aquatics Championships, in Berlin, West Germany, Gregg was edged out by American Mike Bruner who set a world record 2:01.17 in the 200-meter butterfly, with Gregg again taking a silver in the event as he had in the 1976 Olympics to Bruner.

Still swimming competitively and not far off his Olympic time, Gregg placed first with a 2:00.84 at the AAU Long Course National Championships in the Woodlands, Texas, outside Houston on August 5, 1978.

=== After competitive swimming ===
Gregg graduated NC State with a degree in Zoology, and later received a Master's in Exercise Science from the University of Arizona, and a PhD in Exercise and Biochemistry from UC Berkeley. After retiring from competitive swimming and completing his education, he marketed Gatorade for the Quaker Oats Company in Brussels, Belgium for around six years. He then moved to Chicago, remaining in the marketing and advertising business and was active in an attempt to bring the 2016 Olympics to Chicago. He retired from marketing and advertising not long after 2013. Gregg was active as a Masters swimmer, competing primarily in free and fly events and swam with Masters through at least 2013 in Chicago. Gregg was also active as a charter member in the USA Swimming Foundation, and in their Foundation’s Champions Club. He also served on the International Swimming Hall of Fame board of directors and provided early guidance to the Swim Across America organization.

Gregg died on September 11, 2024, at the age of 68.

=== Honors ===
In 1989 he was inducted into the Delaware Sports Hall of Fame.

== See also ==
- List of North Carolina State University people
- List of Olympic medalists in swimming (men)
- List of World Aquatics Championships medalists in swimming (men)
