= Hugo Cuenca =

Venezuelan swimmer (born 1959)

Personal information
- Born: 2 March 1959 (age 67)

Sport
- Sport: Swimming

Hugo Cuenca (born 2 March 1959) is a Venezuelan former swimmer. He competed in the men's 200 metre butterfly at the 1976 Summer Olympics.
