= Dana Shrader =

American swimmer (born 1956)

Dana Shrader Butler
Personal information
- Full name: Dana Jayne Shrader -Butler
- National team: United States
- Born: July 10, 1956 (age 70) Lynwood, California, U.S.
- Education: U. Southern California (1980)
- Height: 5 ft 10 in (1.78 m)
- Weight: 139 lb (63 kg)
- Spouse: Gary Young Butler (1980)
- Children: 1

Sport
- Sport: Swimming
- Events: 100, 200 butterfly 50, 100 freestyle
- Strokes: Butterfly
- Club: Fullerton Aquatic Club; Lakewood Aquatic Club
- College team: University of Arizona
- Coach: Jon Urbanchek; Hank Velecamp (Fullerton Aquatics); Jim Montrella (Lakewood AC)

Dana Jayne Shrader (born July 10, 1956), sometimes appearing in print as Dana Schroeder, known by her married name as Dana Shrader Butler is an American swimmer who competed for the University of Arizona and participated in the 1972 Munich Olympics in the 100 meter butterfly and swam the butterfly leg for the preliminaries of the American women's 4x100 meter medley. The 4x100 meter medley relay team later won a gold medal in the finals, which Shrader did not receive as she had competed for the American 4x100 medley team only in the preliminary rounds. After transferring from the University of Arizona, Shrader graduated the University of Southern California in 1980 with a degree in dental hygiene and worked for a period as a dental hygienist.

== Early life ==
Shrader was born July 10, 1956 in Lynwood, California, to V.J. and Jeanne Shrader. She attended High School and swam several meets for Fullerton's Sunny Hills High School. Her older sisters Randee and Cista were both swimmers at an early age. Hall of Fame and Olympic Coach John Urbanchek was an early influence on her swimming development. Urbanchek coached the swim team at nearby Anaheim High School from around 1964-1978, and later coached the Fullerton team after 2010, and may have assisted with the team in earlier years or independently coached Shrader. Shrader begin competitive swimming around the age of 12. She represented the Lakewood Aquatic Club in nearby Lakewood, California, beginning around 1971, where she was trained by Hall of Fame Coach Jim Montrella. At Sunnyvale High she swam for Hank Velekamp, who also coached her at Fullerton Aquatics where she trained for the 1972 Olympic trials and earlier.

== Early swimming highlights ==
Shrader placed third in the Santa Clara Invitational in the summer of 1972. She was best-known for winning the 100-meter butterfly at the July, 1972 Los Angeles Invitational Meet with an unexpected time of 1:04.56. In preparation for the 1972 Olympics, and during the Olympic games she was managed by Hall of Fame Coach Sherm Chavoor. Chavoor owned Arden Hills swim club in Sacramento, California, where he had coached Mark Spitz, who won 7 gold medals at the 1972 Olympics.

== 1972 Olympic trials ==
Accompanied by both parents at the 1972 Olympic trials in Chicago, Shrader was scheduled to compete in the 100-meter butterfly, the 200-meter butterfly, and the 100-meter freestyle. Her former time of 1:04.5 in the 100-meter butterfly was only .6 seconds short of the world record. At the trials at Portage Park in Chicago, Shrader qualified in the 100-meter butterfly in the finals of the Olympic trials, placing third behind first place Deena Deerdurf who swam a 1:04.08 and Ellie Daniel who placed second.

Subsequent to qualifying at the trials, Shrader trained in Tennessee with the U.S. swimming team, attended a dinner reception at the White House, and then travelled to Munich.

== 1972 Munich Olympics ==
Shrader represented the United States as a 16-year-old High School Junior at the 1972 Summer Olympics in Munich, Germany. Carolyn Woods, another Sunny Hills High School and Fullerton Aquatic Club swimmer also competed with Shrader on the Women's Olympic swimming team. Shrader swam the butterfly leg for the gold medal-winning U.S. team in Heat 2 of the preliminary heats of the women's 4×100-meter medley relay, completing her leg in a time of 1:04.71. She was not eligible, however to receive a medal under the 1972 rules because she did not swim in the event final. Individually, she also competed in the women's 100-meter butterfly, though in a highly competitive field, Shrader finished fifth in the final with a time of 1:03.98. All 5 top finishers broke the world and Olympic record. Her fifth place time was only .25 seconds behind Hungary's Andrea Gyarmati, who swam a 1:03.73. In a finish separated by only half a second by the three medalists, Myumi Aoki of Japan swam a 1:03.34, and Roswith Beier of Germany swam a 1:03.61.

=== University of Arizona ===
Shrader swam for the University of Arizona, beginning around 1974, in a year that the team received extra funding for women's athletics, a total of $100,000, tripling the prior year's budget. Shrader swam for Arizona only about a year, and did not compete in the Fall of 1975. Prior years may not have had a fulltime women's swim coach.

Shrader attended the University of Arizona two years and then transferred closer to home, to the University of Southern California. At USC, she graduated in 1980 and received a degree in Dental Hygiene, as had her sister.

=== Marriage, careers ===
Dana married Gary Young Butler, a graduate of California State, in September of 1980. The couple later had a son together, born around 1988

Shrader worked as a Dental hygienist for several years after graduating USC, though soon became disillusioned with her career choice. In July of 1992, she lived in Irvine, California with husband Gary Butler, and the couple owned a display lighting business in the Newport Beach area. They marketed their lighting products to tract homes in the area.

== See also ==
- List of Olympic medalists in swimming (women)
- List of University of Arizona people
