= Doug Martin (swimmer) =

Canadian swimmer (born 1955)

Personal information
- Full name: Douglas William Martin
- Born: 14 December 1955 (age 70) Windsor, Ontario, Canada

Sport
- Sport: Swimming
- College team: Simon Fraser Red Leafs

Douglas William Martin (born 14 December 1955) is a Canadian former swimmer. He competed in the men's 200 metre butterfly at the 1976 Summer Olympics.
