= Heather Greenwood =

American former freestyle swimmer (born 1958)

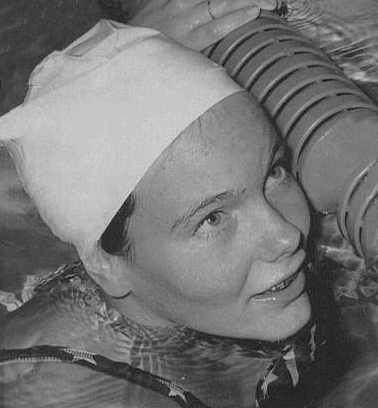
- Greenwood in 1973

Personal information
- Born: 1958 (age 67–68)

Sport
- Sport: Swimming
- Strokes: Freestyle
- Coach: Ron Greenwood (father); Gene Stephens
Medal record
Representing United States
World Championships (LC)
Gold medal – first place	1973 Belgrade	400 m freestyle
Silver medal – second place	1973 Belgrade	4×100 m freestyle
Silver medal – second place	1975 Cali	800 m freestyle
Silver medal – second place	1975 Cali	4×100 m freestyle

Heather Greenwood Harper (born c. 1958) is an American former freestyle swimmer. She won one gold and three silver medals at the world championships in 1973 and 1975, and set a world record over 400 m in 1974.

In 1975 Greenwood enrolled to the University of Southern California, following her brother Mark, who was also a competitive swimmer. She retired from competitions after failing to qualify for the 1976 Summer Olympics.

== See also ==
- List of World Aquatics Championships medalists in swimming (women)
- World record progression 400 metres freestyle

Records
Preceded by Keena Rothhammer	Women's 400 metres freestyle world record-holder (long course); 28 June 1974 – 22 August 1974	Succeeded by Shirley Babashoff
