= Serge Buttet =

French swimmer (1954–2021)

Personal information
- Born: 14 December 1954
- Died: 24 June 2021 (aged 66)

Sport
- Sport: Swimming

Serge Buttet (14 December 1954 – 24 June 2021) was a French butterfly swimmer. He competed in the men's 100 metre butterfly at the 1976 Summer Olympics.
