= Jenny Wylie =

American former competition swimmer

Personal information
- Full name: Jennifer Susan Wylie
- Nickname: "Jenny"
- National team: United States
- Born: March 6, 1958 (age 68) Palo Alto, California, U.S.
- Height: 5 ft 4 in (1.63 m)
- Weight: 126 lb (57 kg)

Sport
- Sport: Swimming
- Strokes: Freestyle
- Club: Santa Clara Swim Club

Jennifer Susan Wylie (born March 6, 1958) is an American former competition swimmer.

Wylie represented the United States as a 14-year-old at the 1972 Summer Olympics in Munich, Germany. She competed in the finals of the women's 400-meter freestyle and finished fifth overall in a time of 4:24.07.
