= Paulo Becskehazy =

Brazilian swimmer and water polo player

Personal information
- Nickname: Paulinho
- Born: 3 March 1949 (age 77) Brazil
- Height: 1.87 m (6 ft 2 in)
- Weight: 80 kg (176 lb)

Sport
- Sport: Swimming
- Strokes: Freestyle
- Club: Botafogo de Futebol e Regatas
- College team: University of California at Los Angeles

Paulo Becskehazy (born 3 March 1949) is a former international freestyle swimmer from Brazil, who competed at one Summer Olympics for his native country.

He worked as a lifeguard in Los Angeles and since 1981 has been a real estate agent in southern Florida.

He holds a degree in geography, with MBA from University of California at Los Angeles, founded his company, PB Commercial Realty Inc.

He is also a water polo coach at the Miami Beach International Water Polo Club.

Of Hungarian origin, he moved to California during his adolescence. He swam for Botafogo, but trained in United States.

In 1971 he was champion of the Brazil Trophy in the 100 meters freestyle and 4×100 meters medley relay, along with José Sylvio Fiolo, Eduardo Alijó Neto and Carlos Antônio Azevedo.

At the 1972 Summer Olympics, in Munich, he finished 4th in the 4×100-metre freestyle (6 seconds and a half below the South American record). Two time water polo All American at El Segundo, California High School 1965, 1966 Two time First Team All American water polo player at UCLA . NCAA Water Champion in 1969 and 1971, runner up in 1971. USA National Team member 74-75-76. USA 1975 Pan American team member second place
