= Merrily Stratten =

Canadian swimmer

Personal information
- Born: 12 June 1951 (age 75) Toronto, Ontario, Canada

Sport
- Sport: Swimming

Merrily Stratten (born 12 June 1951) is a Canadian former swimmer. She competed in the women's 200 metre freestyle at the 1972 Summer Olympics.
