= Gordon Hewit =

British swimmer

Gordon Hewitt
Personal information
- Born: 20 March 1958
- Died: 18 November 2009 (aged 51) Falkirk, Scotland

Sport
- Sport: Swimming

Gordon Hewitt (20 March 1958 – 18 November 2009) was a British swimmer. He competed in the men's 200 metre butterfly at the 1976 Summer Olympics.
