= Angela Franke =

German swimmer (born 1957)

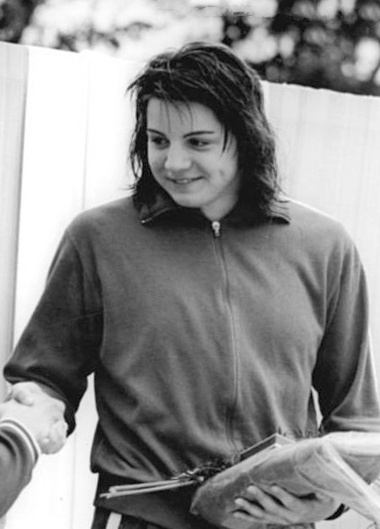
- Franke in 1974

Personal information
- Born: 18 November 1957 (age 68) Magdeburg, East Germany
- Height: 1.76 m (5 ft 9 in)
- Weight: 60 kg (132 lb)

Sport
- Sport: Swimming
- Club: SC Magdeburg
Medal record
Representing East Germany
World Championships
Silver medal – second place	1973 Belgrade	400 m medley
Bronze medal – third place	1975 Cali	200 m medley
European Championships
Gold medal – first place	Vienna	400 m freestyle
Gold medal – first place	Vienna	4×100 m freestyle
Silver medal – second place	Vienna	100 freestyle

Angela Franke (born 18 November 1957) is a retired East German swimmer. She competed at the 1972 Summer Olympics in the 400 m individual medley, but failed to reach the final.

Between 1973 and 1975 she won two gold, two silver and one bronze medals in various freestyle and medley events at the world and European championships. On 18 August 1973 she set a world record in the 400 m individual medley at 5:01.10, and two weeks later, at the 1973 World Aquatics Championships, improved it to 5:00.37; yet she lost to her teammate Gudrun Wegner who swam 4:57.51.
