= Jon Jon Park =

British swimmer

Personal information
- Full name: John Park
- Born: 21 February 1957 (age 69) Johannesburg, South Africa

Sport
- Sport: Swimming

John "Jon Jon" Park (born 21 February 1957) is a South African former swimmer. He competed in the men's 100 metre butterfly at the 1976 Summer Olympics. He also won several bodybuilding titles, including Mr. South Africa Maccabiah and Mr. Golden City.

He was born in Johannesburg, South Africa; his father is former Mr. Universe Reg Park.
