= Enrique Melo =

Spanish swimmer

Personal information
- Born: 23 April 1953 (age 73)

Sport
- Sport: Swimming

Enrique Melo (born 23 April 1953) is a Spanish former freestyle swimmer. He competed in two events at the 1972 Summer Olympics.
