= Viktor Mazanov =

Russian swimmer (born 1947)

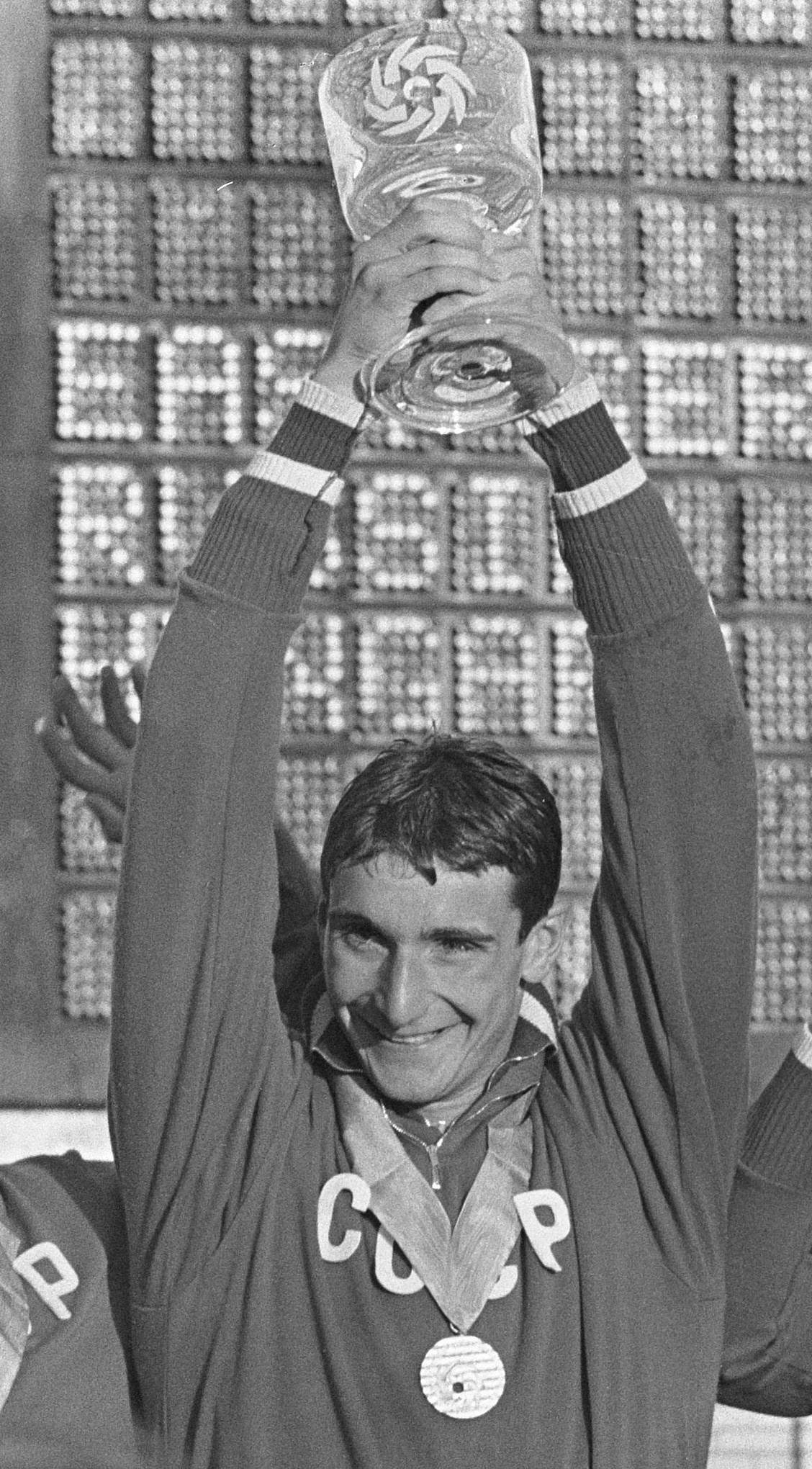
- Mazanov in 1966

Personal information
- Born: 8 March 1947 (age 79) Moscow, Russian SFSR, Soviet Union
- Height: 1.90 m (6 ft 3 in)
- Weight: 82 kg (181 lb)

Sport
- Sport: Swimming
- Club: Burevestnik Moscow
Medal record
Representing Soviet Union
Summer Olympics
Silver medal – second place	1968 Mexico City	4×100 m freestyle
Bronze medal – third place	1968 Mexico City	4×100 m medley
Silver medal – second place	1972 Munich	4×100 m freestyle
Bronze medal – third place	1972 Munich	4×200 m freestyle
European Championships
Gold medal – first place	1966 Utrecht	4×100 m medley
Silver medal – second place	1966 Utrecht	4×100 m freestyle
Gold medal – first place	1970 Barcelona	4×100 m freestyle

Viktor Georgiyevich Mazanov (Russian: Виктор Георгиевич Мазанов; born 8 March 1947) is a retired Russian swimmer who competed in nine events at the 1964, 1968 and 1972 Summer Olympics. He won two silver and two bronze medals in freestyle and medley relays in 1968 and 1972. He also won one silver in two gold medals in relays at the European championships of 1966 and 1970. During his career, he set one world record (4×100 yd medley, 1964) and 13 European (1965–1970) and 26 national (1962–1972) records.
