= Ann Bradshaw (swimmer) =

British swimmer

Personal information
- Born: 25 March 1957 (age 69)

Sport
- Sport: Swimming

Ann Bradshaw (born 25 March 1957) is a British former swimmer. She competed in three events at the 1976 Summer Olympics. The 1976 British Olympic team for the Women's 200 m freestyle - Swimming event included Susan Edmondson, Susan Barnard and Bradshaw.
