= Viktor Aboimov =

Kazakhstani swimmer (born 1949)

Personal information
- Full name: Viktor Aboimov
- Nationality: Kazakhstani
- Born: 14 September 1949 (age 76) Quaraghandy, Kazakh SSR, Soviet Union

Sport
- Sport: Swimming
- Strokes: Freestyle
Medal record
Representing Soviet Union
Olympics
Silver medal – second place	1972 Munich	4×100 m freestyle
World Championships
Silver medal – second place	1973 Belgrade	4×100 m freestyle

Viktor Andreyevich Aboimov (born 14 September 1949) is a Kazakhstani former swimmer who competed in the 1972 Summer Olympics.

After his retirement, he served as the head of aquatics for Dynamo Alma-Ata and the chairman of the Physical Culture and Sports Committee for the Kazakh Ministry of Tourism and Sports.
