= Jo Harshbarger =

American swimmer (born 1956)

- Harshbarger, circa 1977

Personal information
- Full name: Jo Ann Harshbarger
- National team: United States
- Born: November 17, 1956 (age 69) Aurora, Illinois, U.S.
- Height: 5 ft 4 in (1.63 m)
- Weight: 112 lb (51 kg)

Sport
- Sport: Swimming
- Strokes: Freestyle
- Club: Lake Washington Swim Club
- College team: Stanford University
- Coach: Jack Ridley; Lake Washington SC; James Gaughran; Stanford
Medal record
Women's swimming
Representing the United States
World Championships (LC)
Silver medal – second place	1973 Belgrade	800 m freestyle

Jo Ann Harshbarger (born November 17, 1956) is an American former competition swimmer and world record-holder. At the age of 15, Harshbarger competed in the 800-meter freestyle finals at the 1972 Summer Olympics in Munich, Germany, and a year later was a silver medalist in the 800-meter freestyle at the 1973 World Aquatics Championships in Belgrade, Yugoslavia. She set world records in the 800-meter freestyle in 1972 and 1974, and in the 1,500-meter freestyle in 1973.

Harshbarger began swimming and training around 1962 at the age of five, and was soon competing. In her early years, she swam for Newport High School in Bellevue, Washington, and also competed and trained with the Lake Washington Swim Club where she was coached by ASCA Hall of Fame Coach Jack Ridley. Ridley also coached the Newport High School girls' team for ten years leading them to six state championships from 1976-1982 while Harshbarger was at Stanford. In April, 1972, competing for Lake Washington, she swam a 16:59.33 in the 1650 freestyle, placing first in the finals of the National AAU Short Course Swimming Championships. Harshbarger won events in High School State Swimming championships for three successive years. In early November, 1972, after the Olympics, she helped her Newport High School team take the Washington State swimming title, winning the 200 freestyle after setting a meet record time of 1:59.62 in the prelims, and also winning the 400 freestyle after setting a meet record time of 4:06.67 in the preliminaries. In 1973, Harshbarger set a state record of 1:57.6 in the 200 freestyle.

== 1972 Munich Olympics ==
Her time in the 800-meter freestyle at the 1972 Munich Olympic finals was 9:01.21, placing her fourth, just under 4 seconds behind bronze medal winner Novella Caligaris of Italy. Harshbarger's coach at Lake Washington Swim Club, Jack Ridley accompanied her to the 1972 Munich Olympics. They would later marry.

She won a silver medal at the 1973 Belgrade World Aquatics Championships in the 800 m freestyle event.

== National competition wins ==
Overall, Harshbarger was a four-time U.S. National Champion on four occasions, winning the 1500-meter freestyle in 1972, 1973, and 1975 and the 800-meter freestyle in 1972. In 1974, she was recognized as the National Interscholastic Record Holder in the 500-yard freestyle with a time of 5:07.7, though the record held only one year, when it was broken by 1976 future Olympic gold medalist Kim Peyton, who would swim with Harshbarger at Stanford University. As a Senior at Newport High School, Harshbarger won the 1,500-meter freestyle with a time of 17:05.53, at the Santa Clara Invitational Swim Meet on May 18, 1975, beating the second place finisher by 20 seconds. Jo was a four-time U.S. National Champion. She won the 1500-meter freestyle in 1972, 1973, and 1975 and the 800-meter freestyle in 1972.

== World records ==
Her first 800-meter world record was set prior to 17 at the August 6, 1972 US Olympic Team Trials in Chicago, Illinois where she swam a 8:53.83. Two years later she set another 800-meter world record of 8:47.66 at the August 25, 1974 National Swimming Championships in Concord, California, though her swim was the first half of a 1,500-meter final race in which she placed second to Jenny Turrall. Her official world record time for the 800-meter event final was 8:47.59 on August 31.

On August 25, 1973 Harshbarger set a world record in the 1500-meter freestyle of 16:54.14, at the USA Nationals and World Championship Trials in Louisville, Kentucky.

== Swimming for Stanford ==
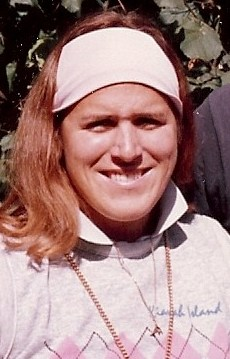
Stanford teammate, '76 Olympian Kim Peyton

Harshbarger committed to Stanford for the fall of 1975, and swam for Hall of Fame Coach Jim Gaughran, receiving one of the school's first athletic scholarships for women in swimming. While at Stanford, she placed fourth in the 500 free with a time of 4:56.3 at the AIAW Women's Swimming Collegiate Championships in Fort Lauderdale on March 18, 1976. In the 1976 Olympic Trials, she recorded her best time in the 800-meter event and broke the American record by one second, but her time was not fast enough to qualify for the U.S. team. That summer, she coached but did not train and subsequently announced she would stop competing at National and International AAU meets. Continuing to swim into her Senior year at Stanford under married name Jo Harshbarger Clark, at the March 17, 1979 AIAW Championships in Pittsburgh, at 22, she set impressive times in the 500-yard freestyle of 4:48.22, and in the 1,650-yard freestyle of 16:26.00, and won both events. Harshbarger would later appear in media under the married name Jo Ann (Harshbarger) Carson.

== Honors ==
Harshbarger was a July 2004 inductee into the Pacific Northwest Swimming Hall of Fame.

== See also ==
- List of Stanford University people
- List of World Aquatics Championships medalists in swimming (women)
- World record progression 800 metres freestyle
- World record progression 1500 metres freestyle

Records
Preceded by Shane Gould; Jennifer Turrall	Women's 800-meter freestyle world record-holder August 6, 1972 – September 3, 1972; August 25, 1974 – March 31, 1975	Succeeded by Keena Rothhammer; Jennifer Turrall
Preceded by Shane Gould	Women's 1,500-meter freestyle world record-holder August 25, 1973 – December 9, 1973	Succeeded by Jennifer Turrall
