= Roswitha Beier =

German swimmer

Personal information
- Born: 22 December 1956 (age 69) Riesa, Bezirk Dresden, East Germany
- Height: 1.60 m (5 ft 3 in)
- Weight: 52 kg (115 lb)

Sport
- Sport: Swimming
- Club: SC Dynamo Berlin
Medal record
Women's swimming
Representing East Germany
Olympic Games
Silver medal – second place	1972 Munich	100 m butterfly
Silver medal – second place	1972 Munich	4×100 m medley
World Championships
Silver medal – second place	1973 Belgrade	200 m butterfly

Roswitha Beier (born 22 December 1956 in Riesa) is a German former swimmer who competed in the 1972 Summer Olympics.
