= Melvin Nash =

American swimmer

Personal information
- Born: Circa 1955 Monroeville, Pennsylvania, US
- Occupations: Collegiate, Club Swim Coach * UT Arlington (1977-79); *Texas A&M (1979-2004); *North Florida Swimming
- Spouse: Carol Frances Reid (1977)
- Children: Boy and girl

Sport
- Sport: Swimming; Backstroke, Freestyle
- College team: Indiana University
- Coached by: Fran Muro (Gateway High School); Larry Petrillo (Gateway High School); James Counsilman (Indiana)
Medal record
Representing United States
World Championships
Gold medal – first place	1973 Belgrade	4×100 m freestyle
Bronze medal – third place	1975 Cali	100 m backstroke
Pan American Games
Gold medal – first place	1971 Cali	100 m backstroke

Melvin "Mel" Nash (born c. 1955) is a former American swimmer and coach who competed for Indiana University, and won a gold and bronze medal at the world championships in 1973 and 1975. He won the 100 m backstroke event at the 1971 Pan American Games in Cali, Colombia. After his swimming career ended as a competitor, he coached swimming at the University of Texas at Arlington, Texas, outside Dallas, from around 1977-1979. He coached at Texas A & M from 1979-2004, remaining as coach over twenty-five years and establishing an admirable record with the men's team of 147 wins and 81 losses. He led the A & M women's team to 81 wins. He later coached swimming and became a Head Coach at the North Florida Swimming Club. An outstanding swimmer and State champion at Gateway High School in Monroeville, Pennsylvania, in 1972 he was chosen by Swimming World Magazine as the national high school swimmer of the year.

== Early life ==
Nash was born in 1955 in Monroeville, Pennsylvania to Mr. and Mrs. Melvin Edward Nash. He graduated from Gateway High School in Monroeville in 1972, where he swam for Coaches Frank Muno and Larry Petrillo. Beginning in his Sophomore year at Gateway High, he was undefeated in High School competition in individual events. In his Senior year, he was a Pennsylvania Athlete of the Year. In 1971, he was ranked third globally in the 100-meter backstroke, and was the USA National Champion in the event. In 1972, he was ranked first nationally in the 100-yard backstroke and 100-yard freestyle, and ranked second in the 200-yard individual medley. In State competition from 1970-72, he was a Pennsylvania Interscholastic Athletic Association state champion seven times, setting seven state records.

== Indiana University ==
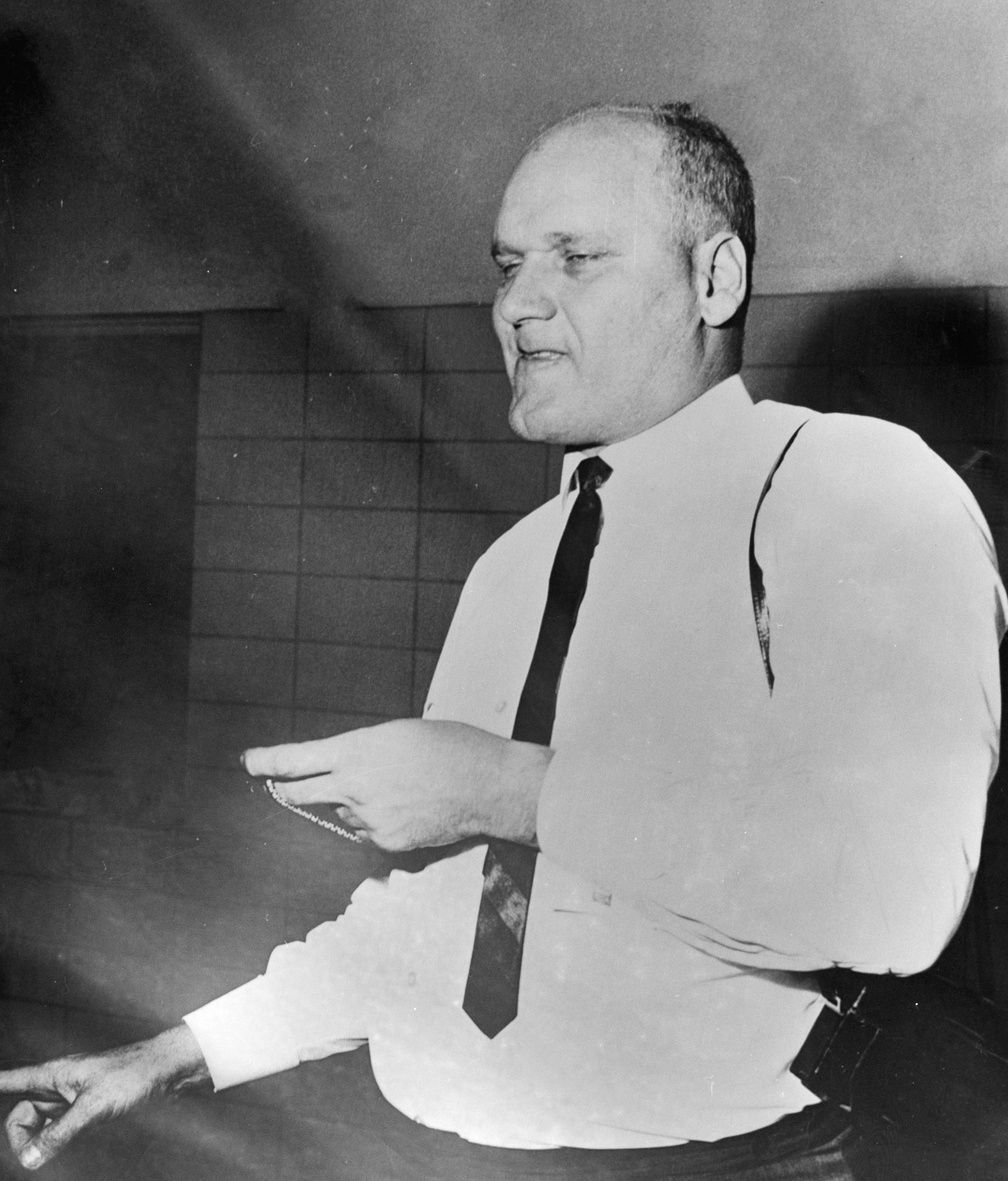
Indiana Coach Counsilman, '63

He attended and swam for Indiana University Bloomington from 1972 to 1976 under Hall of Fame Head Coach James Counsilman who also served as an Olympic coach. At Indiana, where he majored in speech, he earned All American honors all four years, and was a Division I N.C.A.A. All American a total of fifteen times. He won a title in the Big Ten Conference Championship eight times. While at Indiana, he also served as a student coach, perhaps anticipating a possible career in coaching.

In international competition, in 1973 Nash established a world record in both the men's 100-meter freestyle of 52.65 seconds and in the 200 meter freestyle of 1:58.77, at the World Aquatics Championships in Belgrade. He helped lead the American team to a World Aquatics gold medal victory in the 4×100 m freestyle relay, helping set a record of 3:27.18 for World Aquatics competition.

== Coaching ==
After graduating Indiana, he retired from swimming to become a swimming coach at the University of Texas at Arlington around 1977. At 22, he was the youngest head coach of any sport in the National Collegiate Athletic Association. After two years, his program was discontinued, and in the summer of 1979 Nash and his wife Carol moved to the Texas A&M University, where he began as Head Coach in 1979. While coaching at A & M, from 1990-95, he oversaw the design of their new $36 million dollar Natatorium and Student Recreation Center. He remained as Coach at A & M through 2004, having developed more than 60 national team members, leading the men to 147 wins and women's team to 81 wins. With a noteworthy history of wins, the Men's team had a combined record of 147-81 in dual meets. although he was eventually let go by the school. In 1982 and 1986 he was recognized as Southwest Conference men's coach of the year, and in 1987 as women's coach of the year. In 1991 he was the head coach of the U.S. national junior team. After leaving Texas A & M, he served as the Head Coach for North Florida Swimming Inc. As a coach, Nash may be best recognized for his skills teaching stroke technique, particularly in strokes other than freestyle.

== Marriage and family ==
On November 19, 1977, he was married to Carol Frances Reid of Brownstown, Indiana, in Brownstown, Indiana, while he was coaching at the University of Texas Arlington. Like Melvin, Carol was a graduate of Indiana where she majored in music, theatre and dance and where the couple likely met. Melvin and Carol honeymooned in Disney World, before returning to their home in Arlington, Texas. His wife Carol would later help direct a swim camp associated with Texas A&M.

Nash has a daughter Kathryn and son Mel II; both are competitive swimmers. He trained and competed with United States Masters Swimming earning top ten age group times from 1980 through 1994, in butterfly, backstroke, and individual medley events, competing and training primarily with clubs in North Texas, and a few in Indiana. He lives in Jacksonville, Florida, where together with his wife runs the North Florida Swimming club.

== Honors ==
Nash is a member of the Gateway Sports Hall of Fame and the Pennsylvania Sports Hall of Fame. He was a 2012 inductee to the Western Pennsylvania Interscholastic Athletic League Hall of Fame in 2012.
