= Carlos González Cepeda =

Spanish politician (1949–2025)

Member of the Corts Valencianes for Valencia
- In office 18 June 1991 – 17 May 1996

Personal details
- Born: 1949 Alcázar de San Juan, Spain
- Died: 19 March 2025 (aged 75–76)
- Political party: PP
- Education: Complutense University of Madrid
- Occupation: Businessman and politician

Carlos González Cepeda (1949 – 19 March 2025) was a Spanish businessman and politician who was a member of the People's Party. He served in the Corts Valencianes from 1991 to 1996. González died on 19 March 2025.
