= Mayumi Aoki =

Japanese swimmer (born 1953)

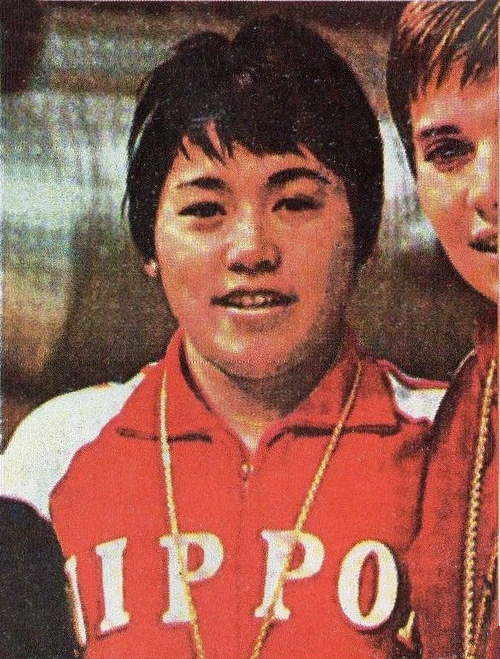

Personal information
- Born: May 1, 1953 (age 73) Yamaga, Japan
- Height: 1.64 m (5 ft 5 in)
- Weight: 63 kg (139 lb)

Sport
- Sport: Swimming
Medal record
Representing Japan
Olympic Games
Gold medal – first place	1972 Munich	100 m butterfly
World Aquatics Championships
Bronze medal – third place	1973 Belgrade	100 m butterfly
Asian Games
Gold medal – first place	1970 Bangkok	100 m butterfly

Mayumi Aoki (青木 まゆみ, Aoki Mayumi; born May 1, 1953) is a Japanese swimmer. She competed at the 1972 Summer Olympics in the 100 m and 200 m butterfly and 4 × 100 m medley relay and won a gold medal in the 100 m butterfly. She won a bronze medal in this event at the 1973 World Aquatics Championships. In 1972 she twice broke the world record in the 100 m butterfly. After retiring from competition she worked as a swimming coach and a high school teacher. In 1989 she was inducted into the International Swimming Hall of Fame.

== See also ==
- List of members of the International Swimming Hall of Fame
