= Novella Calligaris =

Italian swimmer (born 1954)

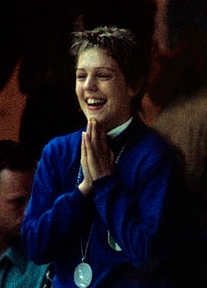
- Novella Calligaris at the 1972 Olympics

Personal information
- Nationality: Italian
- Born: 27 December 1954 (age 71) Padua, Italy
- Height: 1.63 m (5 ft 4 in)
- Weight: 48 kg (106 lb)

Sport
- Sport: Swimming
- Strokes: Freestyle and medley
Medal record
Olympic Games
Silver medal – second place	1972 Munich	400 m freestyle
Bronze medal – third place	1972 Munich	800 m freestyle
Bronze medal – third place	1972 Munich	400 m medley
World Championships
Gold medal – first place	1973 Belgrade	800 m freestyle
Bronze medal – third place	1973 Belgrade	400 m freestyle
Bronze medal – third place	1973 Belgrade	400 m medley
European Championships
Silver medal – second place	1974 Vienna	800 m freestyle
Bronze medal – third place	1970 Barcelona	800 m freestyle
Bronze medal – third place	1974 Vienna	400 m freestyle
Mediterranean Games
Gold medal – first place	1971 Izmir	400 m freestyle
Gold medal – first place	1971 Izmir	200 m medley

Novella Calligaris (born 27 December 1954) is a retired Italian swimmer, and the first Italian to win an Olympic medal in swimming. Her elder brother Mauro Calligaris was also an Olympic swimmer.

== Biography ==
Aged 13 Calligaris competed at the 1968 Olympics in the 200 m, 400 m and 800 m freestyle, but was eliminated in the heats of all events. At 14, she set her first European record. At the 1972 Summer Olympics, she won a medal in every event she competed: a silver medal in the 400 m freestyle, a bronze in the 800 m freestyle, and another bronze in the 400 m individual medley.

The following year, the first FINA World Championships took place in Belgrade. On 9 September 1973, Novella swam 8:52.97 in the 800 m freestyle event, setting a new world record and winning a gold medal. In the same competition she also finished third in the 400 m freestyle and 400 m individual medley.

At the 1974 European Championships, she won two medals, one silver and one bronze. These were the last international achievements of her career, which ended shortly afterward. In retirement she coached swimming, and in the 1980s worked with the junior national team in Rome.

During her career Calligaris won 76 national titles and set 82 national and 21 European records. Until Federica Pellegrini's second place in 200 m freestyle at the 2004 Athens Olympics, she was the only Italian woman to win an Olympic medal in swimming. In 1986 she was inducted to the International Swimming Hall of Fame.

== See also ==
- List of members of the International Swimming Hall of Fame
- Italian sportswomen multiple medalists at Olympics and World Championships
- Italy national swimming team – Multiple medalists
- World record progression 800 metres freestyle
