= Karen LeGresley =

Canadian swimmer

Personal information
- Born: 1 March 1951 (age 75) Toronto, Ontario, Canada

Sport
- Sport: Swimming

Karen LeGresley (born 1 March 1951) is a Canadian former freestyle swimmer. She competed in two events at the 1972 Summer Olympics in Munich, Germany.
