= Jeff Van de Graaf =

Australian swimmer

Personal information
- Born: 1959 (age 66–67)

Sport
- Sport: Swimming
- Strokes: butterfly, medley

Jeff Van de Graaf (born 1959) is an Australian former swimmer. He competed in two events at the 1976 Summer Olympics.
