= Igor Grivennikov =

Russian former swimmer (born 1952)

Personal information
- Full name: Igor Grivennikov
- Nationality: Russian
- Born: 11 July 1952 (age 73)

Sport
- Sport: Swimming
- Strokes: Freestyle
Medal record
Representing Soviet Union
Olympics
Silver medal – second place	1972 Munich	4×100 m freestyle
Bronze medal – third place	1972 Munich	4×200 m freestyle
World Championships
Silver medal – second place	1973 Belgrade	4×100 m freestyle

Igor Grivennikov (born 11 July 1952) is a Russian former swimmer who competed in the 1972 Summer Olympics and won a silver in the 4 × 100 m freestyle relay.
