= Noriko Asano =

Japanese swimmer (born 1955)

Personal information
- Born: 7 August 1955 (age 70)

Sport
- Sport: Swimming
- Strokes: Butterfly

Noriko Asano (浅野 典子, Asano Noriko; born 7 August 1955) is a Japanese former butterfly swimmer. She competed in two events at the 1972 Summer Olympics.
