= Ecuador at the 1973 World Aquatics Championships =

- Flag of Ecuador
- FINA code: ECU
- National federation: Ecuadorian Swimming Federation
- Website: fena-ecuador.org (in Spanish)

in Belgrade, Yugoslavia
- Medals: Gold 0 Silver 0 Bronze 0 Total 0

World Aquatics Championships appearances
- 1973; 1975; 1978; 1982; 1986; 1991; 1994; 1998; 2001; 2003; 2005; 2007; 2009; 2011; 2013; 2015; 2017; 2019; 2022; 2023; 2024

Ecuador competed at the 1973 World Aquatics Championships in Belgrade, Yugoslavia from August 31 to September 9.

== Diving ==
Athlete	Event	Preliminaries		Final	
Athlete	Event	Points	Rank	Points	Rank
Nelson Suárez	Men's springboard	334.80	23	did not advance	
Nelson Suárez	Men's platform	302.43	24	did not advance	
José Vitari	Men's springboard	299.70	24	did not advance	
José Vitari	Men's platform	412.11	17	did not advance	
