= Keena Rothhammer =

American swimmer

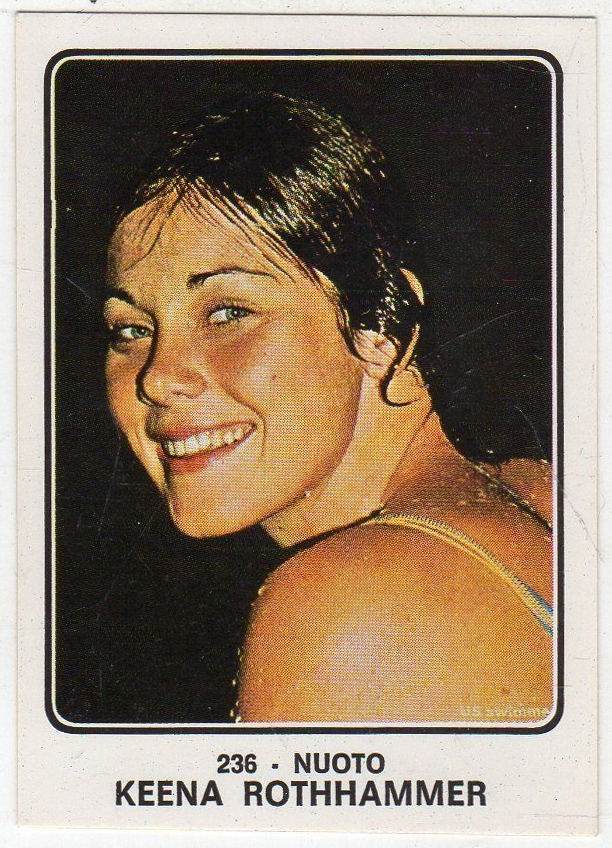

Personal information
- Full name: Keena Ruth Rothhammer
- National team: United States
- Born: February 26, 1957 (age 69) Little Rock, Arkansas, U.S.
- Home town: Santa Clara, California, U.S.
- Height: 5 ft 9 in (1.75 m)
- Weight: 146 lb (66 kg)

Sport
- Sport: Swimming
- Strokes: Freestyle
- Club: Santa Clara Swim Club
- Coach: George Haines (Santa Clara SC)
Medal record
Representing the United States
Olympic Games
Gold medal – first place	1972 Munich	800 m freestyle
Bronze medal – third place	1972 Munich	200 m freestyle
World Championships (LC)
Gold medal – first place	1973 Belgrade	200 m freestyle
Silver medal – second place	1973 Belgrade	400 m freestyle

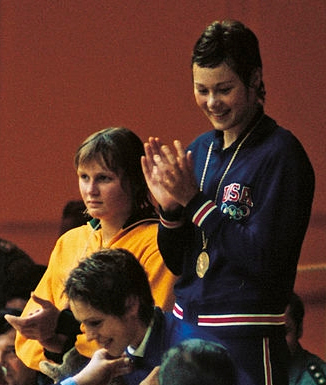
Rothhammer (right) at 1972 Olympics

Keena Ruth Rothhammer (born February 26, 1957) is an American former competition swimmer, Olympic champion, and former world record-holder in two events.

Rothhammer was born to Jewish parents Grant Roy Rothhammer and Dianne Becker Rothhammer in Little Rock, Arkansas, on February 26, 1957. When their daughters exceptional potential as a competitive swimmer became apparent, the Rothhammers left Little Rock for southern California, where there was a greater availability of outstanding youth programs for exceptional age-group swimmers.

== Swimming career ==
As a teenager, she grew up in Santa Clara, California, and trained with the Santa Clara Swim Club under Hall of Fame Coach George Haines, who was noted for training many U.S. Olympic swimmers during the 1960s and 1970s.

Diverse in her stroke skills, she won the 100-meter backstroke in a close finish at the Santa Clara Invitational in July, 1971.

=== 1972 Olympics ===
As a 15-year-old, Rothhammer represented the United States at the 1972 Summer Olympics in Munich, Germany. She became the youngest person to ever win the gold medal in the women's 800-meter freestyle and set a new world record of 8:53.68, while establishing world records in the event on two successive days. She also won the bronze medal in the women's 200-meter freestyle at the 1972 Olympics.

At the 1973 World Aquatics Championships, she won the 200-meter freestyle and finished second in the 400-meter freestyle. The same year, she was named North American Athlete of the Year.

At only 16, to highlight her remarkable achievements, Keena had captured an Olympic gold and bronze medal, and held two world records. She had won fifteen U.S. National championships, set ten American records, and won a gold and silver medal at the first World Championships in 1973.

=== Post swimming careers ===
Keena’s retirement from competitive swimming was due in part to serious migraine headaches which started in junior high school. After her retirement, she traveled the country and worked with Special Olympics programs.

Already retired from competitive swimming, she attended the University of Southern California, and majored in broadcast journalism. She eventually went into financial services, and worked as a comptroller at several different companies.

In 1976, she married Scott Weisbly, though they later divorced. She lived with her second husband, John Zorovich, in the San Luis Obispo area.

=== Honors ===
She was inducted into the International Swimming Hall of Fame as an "Honor Swimmer" in 1991. She was one of the first inductees into the Arkansas Swimming Hall of Fame.

== See also ==
- List of Olympic medalists in swimming (women)
- List of select Jewish swimmers
- List of University of Southern California people
- List of World Aquatics Championships medalists in swimming (women)
- World record progression 400 metres freestyle
- World record progression 800 metres freestyle

Records
Preceded by Shane Gould	Women's 400-meter freestyle world record-holder (long course); August 22, 1973 – June 28, 1974	Succeeded by Heather Greenwood
Preceded by Jo Harshbarger	Women's 800-meter freestyle world record-holder (long course); September 3, 1972 – September 9, 1973	Succeeded by Novella Calligaris
