= Vladimir Krivtsov =

Russian swimmer (born 1952)

Personal information
- Full name: Vladimir Krivtsov
- Nationality: Russian
- Born: 23 March 1952 (age 74) Baku, Azerbaijan SSR, Soviet Union
- Height: 1.92 m (6 ft 4 in)
- Weight: 81 kg (179 lb)

Sport
- Sport: Swimming
- Strokes: Freestyle
Medal record
Representing Soviet Union
World Championships
Silver medal – second place	1973 Belgrade	4×100 m freestyle
Universiade
Gold medal – first place	1973 Moscow	4×200 m freestyle

Vladimir Krivtsov (Russian: Владимир Кривцов; born 23 March 1952) is a retired Russian swimmer who won a silver in the 4 × 100 m freestyle relay at the 1973 World Aquatics Championships. He also competed in the 100 m butterfly event at the 1972 Summer Olympics, but did not reach the finals. In 1975, his was part of the teams that set European records in the 4 × 100 m and 4 × 200 m freestyle relays.
