= Peter Broscienski =

German swimmer

Personal information
- Born: 31 January 1958 (age 68) Bochum, West Germany

Sport
- Sport: Swimming

Peter Broscienski (born 31 January 1958) is a German former swimmer. He competed in two events at the 1976 Summer Olympics.
