= Susan Edmondson =

British swimmer

Personal information
- Born: 21 February 1956 (age 70)

Sport
- Sport: Swimming
Medal record
Women's swimming
Representing England
Commonwealth Games
Bronze medal – third place	1974 Christchurch	4×100 m freestyle

Susan Edmondson (born 21 February 1956) is a British former swimmer. Edmondson competed at the 1972 Summer Olympics and the 1976 Summer Olympics. The 1976 British Olympic team for the Women's 200 m freestyle - Swimming event included Susan Barnard, Ann Bradshaw and Edmondson.

She also represented England and won a bronze medal in the 4 x 100 metres freestyle relay, at the 1974 British Commonwealth Games in Christchurch, New Zealand.
