= Aleksandr Manachinsky =

Soviet swimmer (1958–2020)

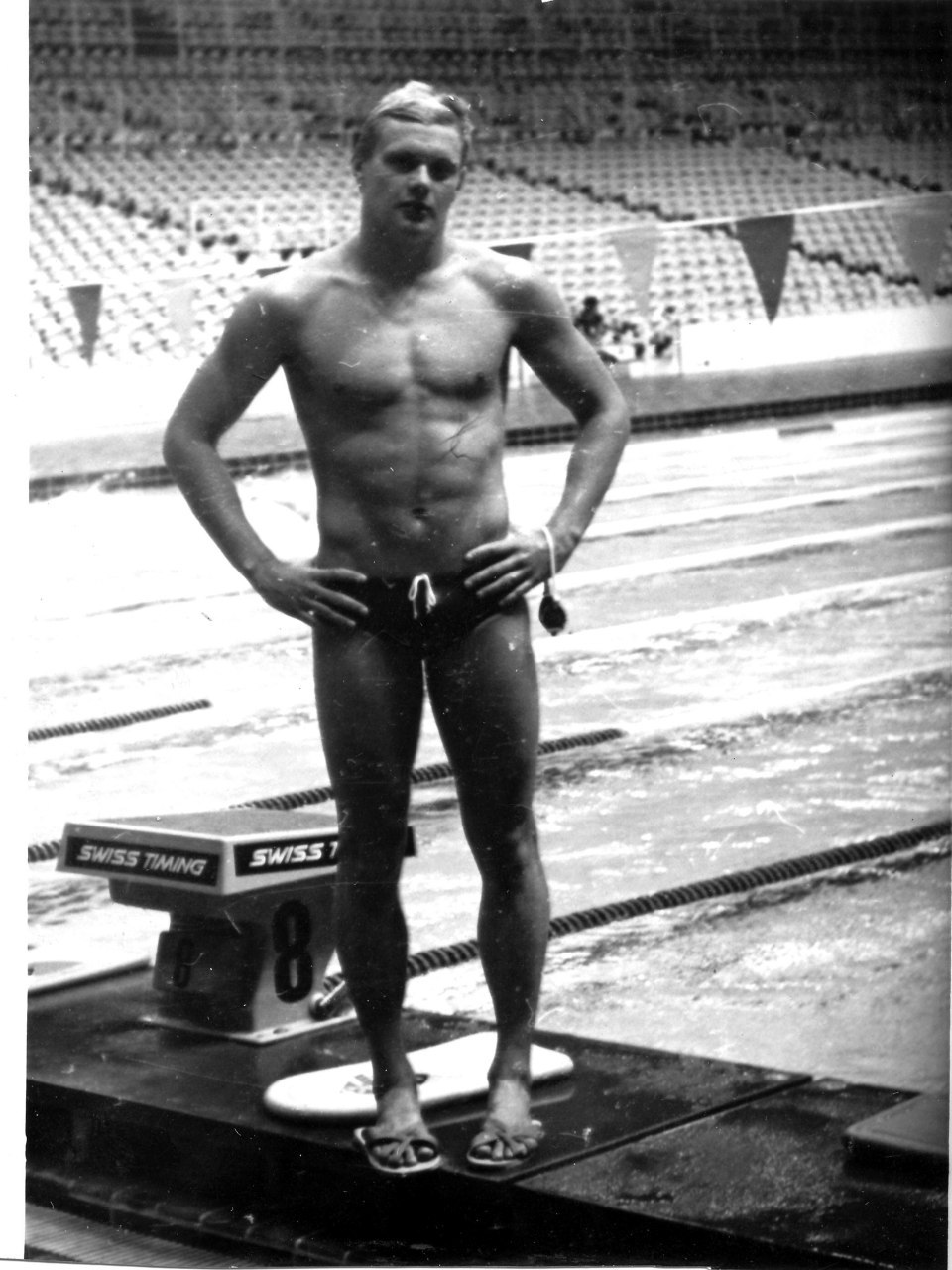

Personal information
- Born: 2 September 1958 Kharkiv, Ukraine
- Died: 1 January 2020 (aged 61) Kharkiv, Ukraine
- Height: 1.83 m (6 ft 0 in)
- Weight: 78 kg (172 lb)

Sport
- Sport: Swimming
- Club: Dynamo Kharkiv

Oleksandr Fyodorovich Manachynskyi (Russian: Александр Федорович Маначинский, Ukrainian: Олександр Федорович Маначинський; 2 September 1958 – 1 January 2020) was a Ukrainian swimmer. He competed at the 1976 Summer Olympics in the 100 m and 200 m butterfly and finished eighth in the latter event. During his career he won three national titles, in the 100 m (1977) and 200 m (1976) butterfly and 4 × 100 m medley relay (1976).

Between 1975 and 2000 he worked as a swimming coach with the Soviet and then Ukrainian national teams.

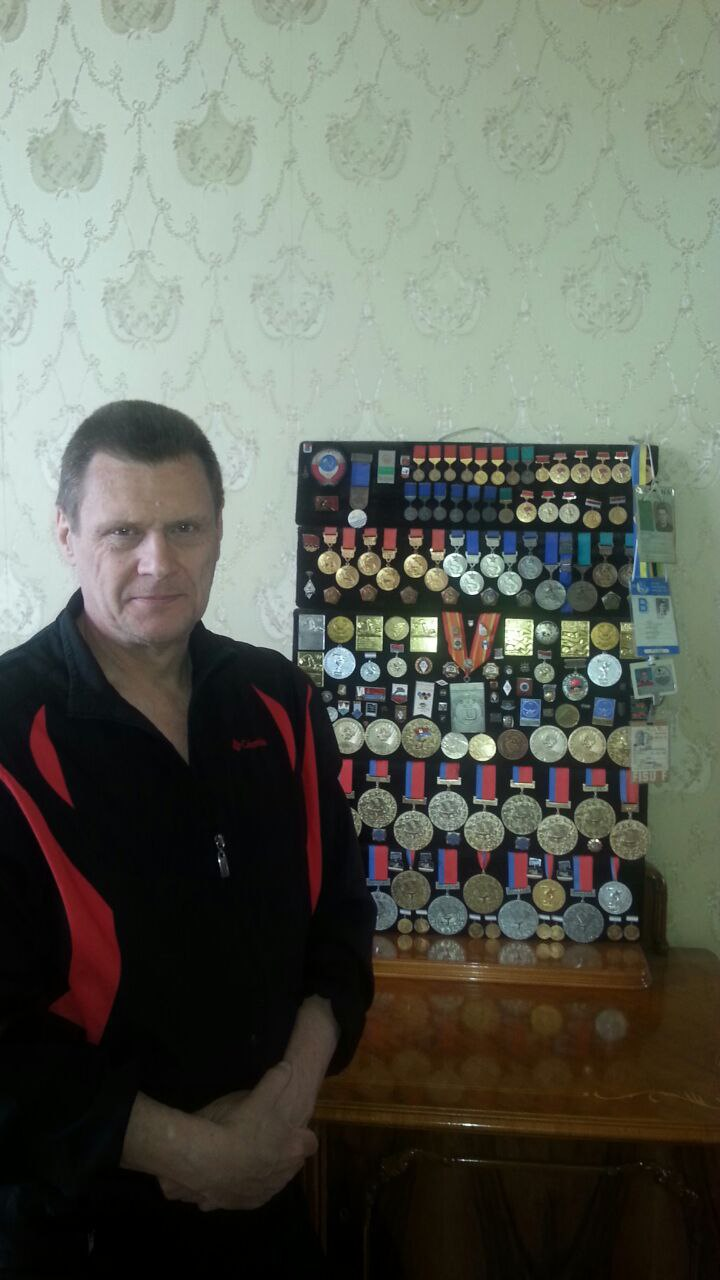
Oleksandr Manachynskyi and his medals

Manachynskyi died on 1 January 2020 at the age of 61.
