= Iryna Ustymenko =

Ukrainian swimmer

Personal information
- Nationality: Ukrainian
- Born: 3 April 1957 (age 69) Donetsk, Soviet Union

Sport
- Sport: Swimming

Iryna Ustymenko (born 3 April 1957) is a Ukrainian former butterfly and freestyle swimmer. She competed in three events at the 1972 Summer Olympics for the Soviet Union.
