= Anne Marie McCaffrey =

Canadian swimmer

Personal information
- Born: 7 August 1955 (age 70) Port Arthur, Ontario, Canada

Sport
- Sport: Swimming

Anne Marie McCaffrey (born 7 August 1955) is a Canadian former swimmer. She competed in the women's 400 metre freestyle at the 1972 Summer Olympics.
