= Carlos González (swimmer) =

Panamanian swimmer (born 1955)

Personal information
- Born: 10 December 1955 (age 70)

Sport
- Sport: Swimming

Carlos González (born 10 December 1955) is a Panamanian former swimmer. He competed in two events at the 1976 Summer Olympics.
