= Narelle Moras =

Australian swimmer

Personal information
- Born: 6 May 1956 (age 70)

Sport
- Sport: Swimming
- Strokes: Freestyle

Narelle Moras (born 6 May 1956) is an Australian former swimmer. She competed in two events at the 1972 Summer Olympics.
