= Gudrun Wegner =

German swimmer (1955–2005)

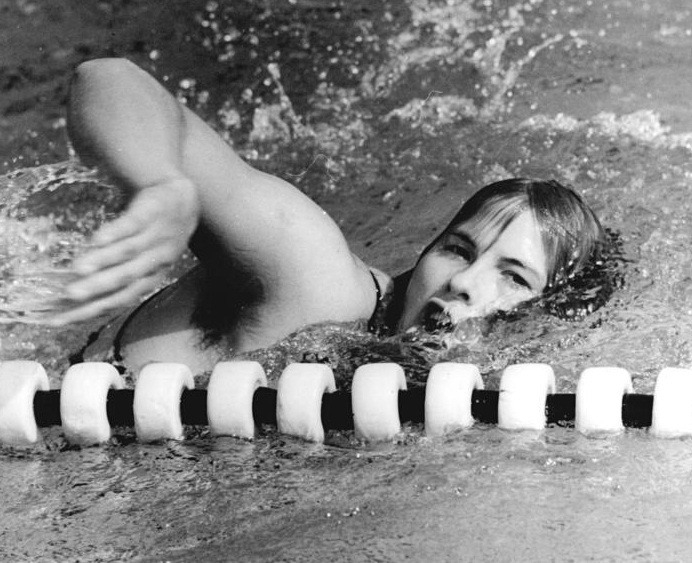
- Gudrun Wegner in 1973

Personal information
- Born: 28 February 1955 Görlitz, East Germany
- Died: 16 January 2005 (aged 49) Dresden, Germany
- Height: 1.75 m (5 ft 9 in)
- Weight: 65 kg (143 lb)

Sport
- Sport: Swimming
- Club: SC Einheit Dresden
Medal record
Representing East Germany
Olympic Games
| Bronze medal – third place | 1972 Munich | 400 m freestyle |
World Championships
| Gold medal – first place | 1973 Belgrade | 400 m medley |
| Bronze medal – third place | 1973 Belgrade | 800 m freestyle |
European Championships
| Silver medal – second place | 1974 Vienna | 400 m medley |
| Bronze medal – third place | 1974 Vienna | 800 m freestyle |

Gudrun Wegner (later Wünsche, 28 February 1955 – 16 January 2005) was a German swimmer. She competed at the 1972 Summer Olympics in the 200, 400 and 800 m freestyle events; she won a bronze medal in the 400 m and finished fifth in 800 m. Later she won one gold, one silver and two bronze medals in the 400 m medley and 800 m freestyle events at the 1973 World Aquatics Championships and 1974 European Aquatics Championships. In 1973 she also set a world record in the 400 m medley.

After retirement from competitions she graduated from the German Institute of Physical Education (DHfK) in Leipzig and worked as a coach. The unification of Germany left her jobless. She briefly worked as waitress and then re-trained as social therapist. She died of cancer.
