= Hartmut Flöckner =

East German swimmer

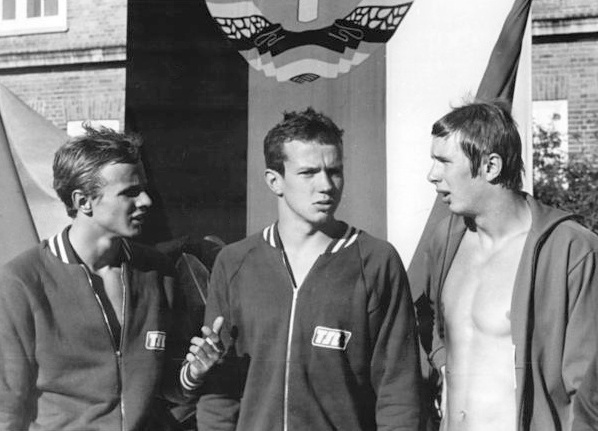
- Wilfried Hartung, Hartmut Flöckner and Lothar Gericke in 1971

Personal information
- Born: 27 June 1953 (age 73) Berlin, Germany
- Height: 1.83 m (6 ft 0 in)
- Weight: 70 kg (150 lb)

Sport
- Sport: Swimming
- Club: Berliner TSC
Medal record
Representing East Germany
Olympic Games
Silver medal – second place	1972 Munich	4×100 m medley
World Championships
Silver medal – second place	1973 Belgrade	4×100 m medley
Bronze medal – third place	1973 Belgrade	4×100 m freestyle
Bronze medal – third place	1973 Belgrade	200 m butterfly
European Championships
Bronze medal – third place	1970 Barcelona	200 m butterfly
Bronze medal – third place	1974 Vienna	200 m butterfly

Hartmut Flöckner (born 27 June 1953) is a retired German swimmer. He competed at the 1972 and 1976 Summer Olympics in six events in total, and won a silver medal in the 4 × 100 m medley relay in 1972. His best individual results were seventh place in the 100 m and 200 m butterfly in 1972.

Between 1970 and 1974 he won one silver and four bronze medals in the 200 m individual butterfly and 4 × 100 m relays at the world and European championships.
