= Ross Seymour =

Australian swimmer

Personal information
- Born: 22 October 1953 (age 72)

Sport
- Sport: Swimming
- Strokes: butterfly
Medal record
Men's swimming
Representing Australia
Commonwealth Games
Silver medal – second place	1974 Christchurch	200 m butterfly

Ross Seymour (born 22 December 1953) is an Australian former swimmer. He competed in two events at the 1976 Summer Olympics.
