= Uta Schütz =

German swimmer

Personal information
- Born: 8 August 1955 (age 70) Mörlenbach, Germany

Sport
- Sport: Swimming

Uta Schütz (born 8 August 1955) is a German former swimmer. She competed in three events at the 1972 Summer Olympics.
