= Roselina Angee =

Colombian swimmer (born 1958)

Personal information
- Born: 12 August 1958 (age 67)

Sport
- Sport: Swimming

Roselina Angee (born 12 August 1958) is a Colombian former swimmer. She competed in five events at the 1972 Summer Olympics.
