= Yugoslavia at the 1973 World Aquatics Championships =

- Flag of Yugoslavia
- FINA code: YUG

in Belgrade, Yugoslavia
- Medals Ranked 15th: Gold 0 Silver 0 Bronze 1 Total 1

World Aquatics Championships appearances
- 1973; 1975; 1978; 1982; 1986; 1991; 1994; 1998; 2001; 2003; 2005; 2007; 2009; 2011; 2013; 2015; 2017; 2019; 2022; 2023; 2024

Yugoslavia competed at the 1973 World Aquatics Championships in Belgrade from August 31 to September 9.

== Diving ==
Athlete	Event	Preliminaries		Final	
Athlete	Event	Points	Rank	Points	Rank
Gaber Brane	Men's platform	302.10	24	did not advance	
Dragan Dumic	Men's platform	313.62	22	did not advance	
