= Swimming at the 1972 Summer Olympics – Women's 200 metre breaststroke =

Women's 200 metre breaststroke at the Games of the XX Olympiad
- Venue: Olympia Schwimmhalle
- Date: 29 August 1972 (heats & final)
- Competitors: 40 from 23 nations
- Winning time: 2:41.71 OR

Medalists
| 1st place, gold medalist(s) | | Beverley Whitfield | Australia |
| 2nd place, silver medalist(s) | | Dana Schoenfield | United States |
| 3rd place, bronze medalist(s) | | Galina Prozumenshchikova | Soviet Union |

The women's 200 metre breaststroke event, included in the swimming competition at the 1972 Summer Olympics, took place on August 29, at the Olympia Schwimmhalle. In this event, swimmers covered four lengths of the 50-metre (160 ft) Olympic-sized pool employing the breaststroke. It was the eleventh appearance of the event, which first appeared at the 1924 Summer Olympics in Paris. A total of 40 competitors from 23 nations participated in the event, another 2 entries from 2 other countries did not compete.

== Records ==
Prior to this competition, the existing world and Olympic records were:

| World record | Catie Ball (USA) | 2:38.5 s | Los Angeles, California | 26 August 1968 |
| Olympic record | Sharon Wichman (USA) | 2:44.4 s | Mexico City, Mexico | 23 October 1968 |

The following records were established during the competition:

| Date | Round | Name | Nationality | Time | OR | WR |
|---|---|---|---|---|---|---|
| 29 August | Heat 3 | Ágnes Kaczander | Hungary | 2:43.13 | OR | |
| 29 August | Final | Beverley Whitfield | Australia | 2:41.71 | OR | |

== Results ==
=== Heats ===
| Rank | Heat | Name | Nationality | Time | Notes |
|---|---|---|---|---|---|
| 1 | 3 | Ágnes Kaczander | Hungary | 2:43.13 | Q, OR |
| 2 | 3 | Éva Kiss | Hungary | 2:43.68 | Q |
| 3 | 6 | Lyudmila Porubayko | Soviet Union | 2:43.68 | Q |
| 4 | 4 | Dana Schoenfield | United States | 2:43.97 | Q |
| 5 | 5 | Galina Prozumenshchikova | Soviet Union | 2:44.20 | Q |
| 6 | 5 | Beverley Whitfield | Australia | 2:44.47 | Q |
| 7 | 6 | Claudia Clevenger | United States | 2:44.74 | Q |
| 8 | 6 | Petra Nows | West Germany | 2:45.20 | Q |
| 9 | 4 | Hannelore Anke | East Germany | 2:45.92 | |
| 10 | 2 | Britt-Marie Smedh | Sweden | 2:46.05 | |
| 11 | 1 | Vreni Eberle | West Germany | 2:46.17 | |
| 12 | 6 | Chieno Shibata | Japan | 2:46.87 | |
| 13 | 2 | Barbara Mitchell | United States | 2:47.05 | |
| 14 | 2 | Pat Beavan | Great Britain | 2:47.42 | |
| 15 | 6 | Erika Rüegg | Switzerland | 2:47.63 | |
| 16 | 5 | Jane Wright | Canada | 2:47.85 | |
| 17 | 3 | Alie te Riet | Netherlands | 2:48.49 | |
| 18 | 4 | Judith Hudson | Australia | 2:49.09 | |
| 19 | 4 | Marian Stuart | Canada | 2:49.11 | |
| 20 | 5 | Christine Jarvis | Great Britain | 2:49.24 | |
| 21 | 1 | Sylvia Langer | East Germany | 2:49.68 | |
| 22 | 5 | Jeanette Pettersson | Sweden | 2:50.36 | |
| 23 | 2 | Ulrike Klees | West Germany | 2:50.48 | |
| 24 | 1 | Tetiana Prudnikova | Soviet Union | 2:50.79 | |
| 25 | 5 | Nieves Panadell | Spain | 2:51.50 | |
| 26 | 3 | Amanda Radnage | Great Britain | 2:51.85 | |
| 27 | 4 | Béatrice Mottoulle | Belgium | 2:52.18 | |
| 28 | 2 | Brigitte Schuchardt | East Germany | 2:53.03 | |
| 29 | 2 | Ann O'Connor | Ireland | 2:53.04 | |
| 30 | 1 | Patrizia Miserini | Italy | 2:53.14 | |
| 31 | 3 | Mairi Ioannidou | Greece | 2:53.53 | |
| 32 | 3 | Shlomit Nir | Israel | 2:53.60 | |
| 33 | 6 | Zuzana Marková | Czechoslovakia | 2:53.88 | |
| 34 | 6 | Ana Elena de la Portilla | Mexico | 2:54.10 | |
| 35 | 4 | Yoko Yamamoto | Japan | 2:54.28 | |
| 36 | 2 | Rose-Marie Pepe | Canada | 2:54.75 | |
| 37 | 3 | Leonor Urueta | Mexico | 2:55.21 | |
| 38 | 4 | Winnie Nielsen | Denmark | 2:59.31 | |
| 39 | 1 | Lee Yue-hwan | Republic of China | 3:04.74 | |
| 40 | 1 | Cristina Teixeira | Brazil | 2:57.03 | DSQ |
| 41 | 5 | Ani Jane Mugrditchian | Lebanon | — | DNS |
| 42 | 1 | Halina Zawadzka | Poland | — | DNS |

=== Final ===
| Rank | Name | Nationality | Time | Notes |
|---|---|---|---|---|
| 1st place, gold medalist(s) | Beverley Whitfield | Australia | 2:41.71 | OR |
| 2nd place, silver medalist(s) | Dana Schoenfield | United States | 2:42.05 | |
| 3rd place, bronze medalist(s) | Galina Prozumenshchikova | Soviet Union | 2:42.36 | |
| 4 | Claudia Clevenger | United States | 2:42.88 | |
| 5 | Petra Nows | West Germany | 2:43.38 | |
| 6 | Ágnes Kaczander | Hungary | 2:43.41 | |
| 7 | Lyudmila Porubayko | Soviet Union | 2:44.48 | |
| 8 | Éva Kiss | Hungary | 2:45.12 | |

== Sources ==
- "The Official Report of the Organizing Committee for the Games of the XXth Olympiad Munich 1972" (PDF). Volume 3: The Competitions. Volume Two, Part 2. Munich Organizing Committee. 1972. Archived from the original (PDF) on 27 September 2007.
- Albert Schoenfeld, ed. (October 1972). "Results from the 1972 Olympic Games (Munich)" (PDF). Swimming World & Junior Swimmer. Albert Schoenfeld. p. 68. ISSN 0039-7431.
- "Swimming at the 1972 München Summer Games: Women's 200 metres Breaststroke". Olympics at Sports-Reference.com. Sports Reference, LLC. Archived from the original on 17 April 2020.
