= Swimming at the 1972 Summer Olympics – Women's 100 metre breaststroke =

Women's 100 metre breaststroke at the Games of the XX Olympiad
- Venue: Olympia Schwimmhalle
- Date: 1 September 1972 (heats & semifinals); 2 September 1972 (final)
- Competitors: 40 from 22 nations
- Winning time: 1:13.58 WR

Medalists
| 1st place, gold medalist(s) | | Cathy Carr | United States |
| 2nd place, silver medalist(s) | | Galina Prozumenshchikova | Soviet Union |
| 3rd place, bronze medalist(s) | | Beverley Whitfield | Australia |

The women's 100 metre breaststroke event at the 1972 Olympic Games took place between September 1 and September 2 in the Schwimmhalle, Olympiapark, München. This swimming event used the breaststroke. Because an Olympic size swimming pool is 50 metres long, this race consisted of two lengths of the pool.

== Results ==
=== Heats ===
Heat 1

| Rank | Athlete | Country | Time | Notes |
|---|---|---|---|---|
| 1 | Lyudmila Porubayko | Soviet Union | 1:17.14 | |
| 2 | Renate Vogel | East Germany | 1:17.33 | |
| 3 | Beverley Whitfield | Australia | 1:17.59 | |
| 4 | Tetiana Prudnikova | Soviet Union | 1:18.11 | |
| 5 | Yoko Yamamoto | Japan | 1:18.94 | |
| 6 | Ann O'Connor | Ireland | 1:19.13 | |
| 7 | Judith Hudson | Australia | 1:19.78 | |
| 8 | Shlomit Nir | Israel | 1:20.90 | |

Heat 2

| Rank | Athlete | Country | Time | Notes |
|---|---|---|---|---|
| 1 | Judy Melick | United States | 1:16.75 | |
| 2 | Vreni Eberle | West Germany | 1:17.67 | |
| 3 | Lynn Vidali | United States | 1:18.80 | |
| 4 | Zuzana Marková | Czechoslovakia | 1:18.88 | |
| 5 | Jaroslava Slavíčková | Czechoslovakia | 1:19.12 | |
| 6 | Diana Harris | Great Britain | 1:19.19 | |
| 7 | Winnie Nielsen | Denmark | 1:23.00 | |
| 8 | Leonor Urueta | Mexico | 1:23.21 | |

Heat 3

| Rank | Athlete | Country | Time | Notes |
|---|---|---|---|---|
| 1 | Dorothy Harrison | Great Britain | 1:16.99 | |
| 2 | Christine Jarvis | Great Britain | 1:18.27 | |
| 3 | Sylvia Langer | East Germany | 1:18.29 | |
| 4 | Brigitte Schuchardt | East Germany | 1:18.62 | |
| 5 | Dagmar Sierck | West Germany | 1:18.80 | |
| 6 | Jane Wright | Canada | 1:20.56 | |
| 7 | Cristina Teixeira | Brazil | 1:20.58 | |
| 8 | Ani Jane Mugrditchian | Lebanon | 1:29.71 | |

Heat 4

| Rank | Athlete | Country | Time | Notes |
|---|---|---|---|---|
| 1 | Halyna Prozumenshchykova-Stepanova | Soviet Union | 1:17.18 | |
| 2 | Jeanette Pettersson | Sweden | 1:17.83 | |
| 3 | Éva Kiss | Hungary | 1:18.57 | |
| 4 | Alie te Riet | Netherlands | 1:18.79 | |
| 5 | Tineke Hofland | Netherlands | 1:19.38 | |
| 6 | Patricia Siewert | West Germany | 1:19.54 | |
| 7 | Mairi Ioannidou | Greece | 1:21.70 | |
| 8 | Lee Yue-hwan | Chinese Taipei | 1:25.47 | |

Heat 5

| Rank | Athlete | Country | Time | Notes |
|---|---|---|---|---|
| 1 | Cathy Carr | United States | 1:16.01 | |
| 2 | Ágnes Kaczander-Kiss | Hungary | 1:16.52 | |
| 3 | Britt-Marie Smedh | Sweden | 1:17.21 | |
| 4 | Erika Rüegg | Switzerland | 1:17.95 | |
| 5 | Sylvia Dockerill | Canada | 1:18.64 | |
| 6 | Marian Stuart | Canada | 1:18.69 | |
| 7 | Béatrice Mottoulle | Belgium | 1:20.79 | |
| 8 | Ana Elena de la Portilla | Mexico | 1:21.61 | |

=== Semifinals ===
Heat 1

| Rank | Athlete | Country | Time | Notes |
|---|---|---|---|---|
| 1 | Galina Prozumenshchikova | Soviet Union | 1:15.89 | |
| 2 | Ágnes Kaczander-Kiss | Hungary | 1:16.34 | |
| 3 | Dorothy Harrison | Great Britain | 1:16.53 | |
| 4 | Vreni Eberle | West Germany | 1:16.76 | |
| 5 | Renate Vogel | East Germany | 1:16.87 | |
| 6 | Erika Rüegg | Switzerland | 1:17.50 | |
| 7 | Christine Jarvis | Great Britain | 1:17.58 | |
| 8 | Éva Kiss | Hungary | 1:17.59 | |

Heat 2

| Rank | Athlete | Country | Time | Notes |
|---|---|---|---|---|
| 1 | Cathy Carr | United States | 1:15.00 | OR |
| 2 | Judy Melick | United States | 1:16.22 | |
| 3 | Beverley Whitfield | Australia | 1:16.26 | |
| 4 | Britt-Marie Smedh | Sweden | 1:16.67 | |
| 5 | Lyudmila Porubayko | Soviet Union | 1:16.85 | |
| 6 | Jeanette Pettersson | Sweden | 1:17.54 | |
| 7 | Tetiana Prudnikova | Soviet Union | 1:19.37 | |
| 8 | Sylvia Langer | East Germany | 1:20.03 | |

Key: OR = Olympic record

=== Final ===
| Rank | Athlete | Country | Time | Notes |
|---|---|---|---|---|
| 1 | Cathy Carr | United States | 1:13.58 | WR |
| 2 | Galina Prozumenshchikova | Soviet Union | 1:14.99 | |
| 3 | Beverley Whitfield | Australia | 1:15.73 | |
| 4 | Ágnes Kaczander-Kiss | Hungary | 1:16.26 | |
| 5 | Judy Melick | United States | 1:16.34 | |
| 6 | Vreni Eberle | West Germany | 1:17.16 | |
| 7 | Britt-Marie Smedh | Sweden | 1:17.19 | |
| 8 | Dorothy Harrison | Great Britain | 1:17.49 | |

Key: WR = World record
