= Swimming at the 1973 World Aquatics Championships – Women's 200 metre breaststroke =

Women's 200 metre breaststroke at the 1973 World Aquatics Championships
- Dates: September 7, 1973
- Competitors: 25 from 19 nations
- Winning time: 2:40.012 CR

Medalists
| gold medal | Renate Vogel | East Germany |
| silver medal | Hannelore Anke | East Germany |
| bronze medal | Lynn Colella | United States |

The women's 200 metre breaststroke competition of the swimming events at the 1973 World Aquatics Championships took place on September 7.

== Records ==
Prior to the competition, the existing world and championship records were as follows.

| World record | Yuliya Bogdanova (URS) | 2:38.32 | Leningrad, Soviet Union | 7 April 1971 |
| Competition record | N/A | N/A | N/A | N/A |

The following records were established during the competition:

| Date | Event | Name | Nationality | Time | Record |
|---|---|---|---|---|---|
| 7 September | Heat | Renate Vogel | East Germany | 2:44.052 | CR |
| 7 September | Heat | Hannelore Anke | East Germany | 2:41.846 | CR |
| 7 September | Final | Renate Vogel | East Germany | 2:40.012 | CR |

== Results ==
=== Heats ===
25 swimmers participated in 4 heats, qualified swimmers are listed:

| Rank | Heat | Lane | Name | Nationality | Time | Notes |
|---|---|---|---|---|---|---|
| 1 | 4 | - | Hannelore Anke | East Germany | 2:41.846 | Q, CR |
| 2 | 4 | - | Lynn Colella | United States | 2:42.434 | Q |
| 3 | 1 | - | Renate Vogel | East Germany | 2:44.052 | Q, CR |
| 4 | 3 | - | Britt-Marie Smedh | Sweden | 2:44.235 | Q |
| 5 | 4 | - | Lyudmila Porubayko | Soviet Union | 2:44.456 | Q |
| 6 | 2 | - | Petra Nows | West Germany | 2:45.653 | Q |
| 7 | 2 | - | Éva Kiss | Hungary | 2:45.970 | Q |
| 8 | 2 | - | Alie te Riet | Netherlands | 2:46.076 | Q |
| 9 | 3 | - | Beverley Whitfield | Australia | 2:46.960 | |
| 10 | 1 | - | Vicki Hays | United States | 2:47.136 | |
| 11 | 4 | - | M. Iwashita | Japan | 2:48.591 | |
| 12 | 1 | - | Judith Hudson | Australia | 2:49.660 | |
| 13 | 4 | - | Marian Stuart | Canada | 2:50.012 | |
| 14 | 3 | - | O. Luskatova | Soviet Union | 2:50.336 | |
| 15 | 3 | - | Olga Chlupova | Czechoslovakia | 2:50.949 | |
| 16 | 1 | - | Cristina Bassani | Brazil | 2:52.074 | |
| 17 | 2 | - | Jane Lowe | New Zealand | 2:52.601 | |
| 18 | 1 | - | Sandra Seath | Canada | 2:53.025 | |
| 19 | 1 | - | S. Mendonça | Brazil | 2:54.310 | |
| 20 | 4 | - | V. Petkovic | Yugoslavia | 2:55.108 | |
| 21 | 4 | - | Paola Morozzi | Italy | 2:55.149 | |
| 22 | 3 | - | Nieves Panadell | Spain | 2:56.290 | |
| 23 | 2 | - | U. El Shenawi | Egypt | 2:57.621 | |
| 24 | 2 | - | Angela López | Puerto Rico | 2:58.361 | |
| 25 | 3 | - | E. Aktulga | Turkey | 3:08.140 | |

=== Final ===
The results of the final are below.

| Rank | Lane | Name | Nationality | Time | Notes |
|---|---|---|---|---|---|
| 1st place, gold medalist(s) | 3 | Renate Vogel | East Germany | 2:40.012 | CR |
| 2nd place, silver medalist(s) | 4 | Hannelore Anke | East Germany | 2:40.495 | |
| 3rd place, bronze medalist(s) | 5 | Lynn Colella | United States | 2:41.710 | |
| 4 | 2 | Lyudmila Porubayko | Soviet Union | 2:42.218 | |
| 5 | 6 | Britt-Marie Smedh | Sweden | 2:43.160 | |
| 6 | 7 | Petra Nows | West Germany | 2:44.698 | |
| 7 | 8 | Alie te Riet | Netherlands | 2:44.893 | |
| 8 | 1 | Éva Kiss | Hungary | 2:45.509 | |
