= Swimming at the 1973 World Aquatics Championships – Women's 100 metre breaststroke =

Women's 100 metre breaststroke at the 1973 World Aquatics Championships
- Dates: September 5, 1973
- Competitors: 24 from 18 nations
- Winning time: 1:13.748

Medalists
gold medal	Renate Vogel	East Germany
silver medal	Lyubov Rusanova	Soviet Union
bronze medal	Brigitte Schuchardt	East Germany

The women's 100 metre breaststroke competition of the swimming events at the 1973 World Aquatics Championships took place on September 5.

== Records ==
Prior to the competition, the existing world and championship records were as follows.

World record	Cathy Carr (USA)	1:13.58	Munich, West Germany	2 September 1973
Competition record	N/A	N/A	N/A	N/A

The following records were established during the competition:

Date	Event	Name	Nationality	Time	Record
5 September	Heat	Britt-Marie Smedh	Sweden	1:17.030	CR
5 September	Heat	Lyubov Rusanova	Soviet Union	1:16.762	CR
5 September	Heat	Renate Vogel	East Germany	1:14.600	CR
5 September	Final	Renate Vogel	East Germany	1:13.748	CR

== Results ==
=== Heats ===
24 swimmers participated in 3 heats, qualified swimmers are listed:

Rank	Heat	Lane	Name	Nationality	Time	Notes
1	3	-	Renate Vogel	East Germany	1:14.600	Q, CR
2	3	-	Lynn Colella	United States	1:16.670	Q
3	2	-	Lyubov Rusanova	Soviet Union	1:16.762	Q, CR
4	2	-	Brigitte Schuchardt	East Germany	1:16.877	Q
5	1	-	Britt-Marie Smedh	Sweden	1:17.030	Q, CR
6	2	-	Petra Nows	West Germany	1:17.271	Q
7	1	-	Marcia Morey	United States	1:17.325	Q
8	2	-	Christine Jarvis	Great Britain	1:17.995	Q
9	1	-	Éva Kiss	Hungary	1:18.136	
10	2	-	Sylvie Deschamps	Canada	1:18.147	
11	3	-	O. Luskatova	Soviet Union	1:18.920	
12	3	-	Judith Hudson	Australia	1:19.210	
13	2	-	Beverley Whitfield	Australia	1:19.390	
14	3	-	Marian Stuart	Canada	1:19.570	
15	1	-	Olga Chlupova	Czechoslovakia	1:20.048	
16	1	-	Cristina Bassani	Brazil	1:20.481	
17	3	-	Jane Lowe	New Zealand	1:20.770	
18	2	-	S. Mendonça	Brazil	1:20.819	
19	3	-	V. Petkovic	Yugoslavia	1:21.170	
20	1	-	M. Iwashita	Japan	1:21.446	
21	1	-	Angela López	Puerto Rico	1:21.828	
22	3	-	Nieves Panadell	Spain	1:21.920	
23	1	-	U. El Shenawi	Egypt	1:23.503	
24	2	-	E. Aktulga	Turkey	1:28.048	

=== Final ===
The results of the final are below.

Rank	Lane	Name	Nationality	Time	Notes
1st place, gold medalist(s)	-	Renate Vogel	East Germany	1:13.748	CR, ER
2nd place, silver medalist(s)	-	Lyubov Rusanova	Soviet Union	1:15.428	
3rd place, bronze medalist(s)	-	Brigitte Schuchardt	East Germany	1:15.821	
4	-	Christine Jarvis	Great Britain	1:16.358	NR
5	-	Lynn Colella	United States	1:16.758	
6	-	Britt-Marie Smedh	Sweden	1:16.790	
7	-	Petra Nows	West Germany	1:16.931	
8	-	Marcia Morey	United States	1:17.049	
