= Swimming at the 1976 Summer Olympics – Women's 200 metre butterfly =

Women's 200 metre butterfly at the Games of the XXI Olympiad
- Venue: Montreal Olympic pool
- Date: 19 July 1976 (heats & final)
- Competitors: 32 from 20 nations
- Winning time: 2:11.41 OR

Medalists
| 1st place, gold medalist(s) | | Andrea Pollack | East Germany |
| 2nd place, silver medalist(s) | | Ulrike Tauber | East Germany |
| 3rd place, bronze medalist(s) | | Rosemarie Kother-Gabriel | East Germany |

The women's 200 metre butterfly event for the 1976 Summer Olympics was held in Montreal, Canada. The event took place on 19 July 1976.

== Results ==
=== Heats ===
Heat 1

| Rank | Athlete | Country | Time | Notes |
|---|---|---|---|---|
| 1 | Karen Moe-Thornton | United States | 2:14.53 | Q, OR |
| 2 | Becky Smith | Canada | 2:15.79 | |
| 3 | Judith Hudson | Australia | 2:18.12 | |
| 4 | Gunilla Andersson | Sweden | 2:22.04 | |
| 5 | María Mock | Puerto Rico | 2:23.71 | |
| 6 | Rosemary Ribeiro | Brazil | 2:23.79 | |

Heat 2

| Rank | Athlete | Country | Time | Notes |
|---|---|---|---|---|
| 1 | Tamara Shelofastova | Soviet Union | 2:14.39 | Q, OR |
| 2 | Donnalee Wennerstrom | United States | 2:15.56 | |
| 3 | Linda Hanel | Australia | 2:17.66 | |
| 4 | Beate Jasch | West Germany | 2:19.19 | |
| 5 | Joanne Atkinson | Great Britain | 2:21.23 | |
| 6 | Miriam Hopkins | Ireland | 2:24.96 | |
| 7 | Þórunn Alfreðsdóttir | Iceland | 2:29.22 | |

Heat 3

| Rank | Athlete | Country | Time | Notes |
|---|---|---|---|---|
| 1 | Andrea Pollack | East Germany | 2:11.56 | Q, OR |
| 2 | Nataliya Popova | Soviet Union | 2:14.65 | Q |
| 3 | Lynne Rowe | New Zealand | 2:17.89 | |
| 4 | Yasue Hatsuda | Japan | 2:18.03 | |
| 5 | Anne Adams | Great Britain | 2:22.62 | |
| 6 | Chantal Grimard | Belgium | 2:26.04 | |

Heat 4

| Rank | Athlete | Country | Time | Notes |
|---|---|---|---|---|
| 1 | Ulrike Tauber | East Germany | 2:13.50 | Q |
| 2 | Wendy Quirk | Canada | 2:14.30 | Q |
| 3 | Cheryl Gibson | Canada | 2:14.65 | Q |
| 4 | Donatella Talpo-Schiavon | Italy | 2:21.88 | |
| 5 | María París | Costa Rica | 2:23.52 | |
| 6 | María Hung | Venezuela | 2:23.64 | |
| 7 | Jane Alexander | Great Britain | 2:26.61 | |

Heat 5

| Rank | Athlete | Country | Time | Notes |
|---|---|---|---|---|
| 1 | Rosemarie Kother-Gabriel | East Germany | 2:12.93 | Q |
| 2 | Camille Wright | United States | 2:14.77 | |
| 3 | Michelle Ford | Australia | 2:18.24 | |
| 4 | Kuniko Banno | Japan | 2:21.68 | |
| 5 | José Damen | Netherlands | 2:21.73 | |
| 6 | Rossana Juncos | Argentina | 2:28.81 | |

=== Final ===
| Rank | Athlete | Country | Time | Notes |
|---|---|---|---|---|
| 1 | Andrea Pollack | East Germany | 2:11.41 | OR |
| 1 | Ulrike Tauber | East Germany | 2:12.50 | |
| 1 | Rosemarie Kother-Gabriel | East Germany | 2:12.86 | |
| 4 | Karen Moe-Thornton | United States | 2:12.90 | |
| 5 | Wendy Quirk | Canada | 2:13.68 | |
| 6 | Cheryl Gibson | Canada | 2:13.91 | |
| 7 | Tamara Shelofastova | Soviet Union | 2:14.26 | |
| 8 | Nataliya Popova | Soviet Union | 2:14.50 | |
