= Swimming at the 1976 Summer Olympics – Women's 100 metre butterfly =

Women's 100 metre butterfly at the Games of the XXI Olympiad
- Venue: Montreal Olympic pool
- Date: 21 July 1976 (heats & semifinals); 22 July 1976 (final)
- Competitors: 39 from 23 nations
- Winning time: 1:00.13 WR

Medalists
| 1st place, gold medalist(s) | | Kornelia Ender | East Germany |
| 2nd place, silver medalist(s) | | Andrea Pollack | East Germany |
| 3rd place, bronze medalist(s) | | Wendy Boglioli | United States |

The women's 100 metre butterfly event for the 1976 Summer Olympics was held in Montreal. The event took place on 21 & 22 July 1976.

== Results ==
=== Heats ===
Heat 1

| Rank | Athlete | Country | Time | Notes |
|---|---|---|---|---|
| 1 | Hélène Boivin | Canada | 1:02.67 | Q, OR |
| 2 | LeLei Fonoimoana | United States | 1:02.75 | Q |
| 3 | Sue Jenner | Great Britain | 1:04.19 | Q |
| 4 | Lynne Rowe | New Zealand | 1:04.23 | Q |
| 5 | Jane Alexander | Great Britain | 1:06.33 | |
| 6 | Þórunn Alfreðsdóttir | Iceland | 1:09.63 | |

Heat 2

| Rank | Athlete | Country | Time | Notes |
|---|---|---|---|---|
| 1 | Wendy Boglioli | United States | 1:01.84 | Q, OR |
| 2 | Yasue Hatsuda | Japan | 1:03.32 | Q |
| 3 | Joanne Atkinson | Great Britain | 1:04.70 | |
| 4 | Chantal Grimard | Belgium | 1:06.10 | |
| 5 | Donatella Talpo-Schiavon | Italy | 1:06.15 | |
| 6 | Montserrat Majo | Spain | 1:06.79 | |

Heat 3

| Rank | Athlete | Country | Time | Notes |
|---|---|---|---|---|
| 1 | Kornelia Ender | East Germany | 1:02.45 | Q |
| 2 | María París | Costa Rica | 1:03.67 | Q |
| 3 | Linda Hanel | Australia | 1:03.78 | Q |
| 4 | Nira Stove | Australia | 1:04.78 | |
| 5 | Ineke Ran | Netherlands | 1:05.63 | |
| 6 | Rossana Juncos | Argentina | 1:06.76 | |
| 7 | Shelley Cramer | Virgin Islands | 1:08.55 | |

Heat 4

| Rank | Athlete | Country | Time | Notes |
|---|---|---|---|---|
| 1 | Wendy Quirk | Canada | 1:01.93 | Q |
| 2 | Camille Wright | United States | 1:02.22 | Q |
| 3 | Gunilla Andersson | Sweden | 1:04.48 | |
| 4 | Beate Jasch | West Germany | 1:04.82 | |
| 5 | María Hung | Venezuela | 1:07.37 | |
| 6 | Sansanee Changkasiri | Thailand | 1:10.97 | |

Heat 5

| Rank | Athlete | Country | Time | Notes |
|---|---|---|---|---|
| 1 | Rosemarie Kother-Gabriel | East Germany | 1:02.34 | Q |
| 2 | Tamara Shelofastova | Soviet Union | 1:02.40 | Q |
| 3 | Kuniko Banno | Japan | 1:03.66 | Q |
| 4 | Nataliya Popova | Soviet Union | 1:05.22 | |
| 5 | José Damen | Netherlands | 1:06.09 | |
| 6 | Marianela Huen | Venezuela | 1:07.17 | |
| 7 | Liliana Cian | Colombia | 1:09.91 | |

Heat 6

| Rank | Athlete | Country | Time | Notes |
|---|---|---|---|---|
| 1 | Andrea Pollack | East Germany | 1:01.43 | Q, OR |
| 2 | Susan Sloan | Canada | 1:03.12 | Q |
| 3 | Gudrun Beckmann | West Germany | 1:04.36 | |
| 4 | Lyle Smith | Australia | 1:04.71 | |
| 5 | Flavia Nadalutti | Brazil | 1:06.29 | |
| 6 | Rosemary Ribeiro | Brazil | 1:06.50 | |
| 7 | María Mock | Puerto Rico | 1:06.52 | |

=== Semifinals ===
Heat 1

| Rank | Athlete | Country | Time | Notes |
|---|---|---|---|---|
| 1 | Wendy Boglioli | United States | 1:01.75 | Q |
| 2 | Camille Wright | United States | 1:01.89 | Q |
| 3 | Tamara Shelofastova | Soviet Union | 1:02.40 | Q |
| 4 | Hélène Boivin | Canada | 1:02.90 | |
| 5 | Susan Sloan | Canada | 1:02.91 | |
| 6 | Linda Hanel | Australia | 1:03.30 | |
| 7 | Lynne Rowe | New Zealand | 1:04.06 | |
| 8 | Kuniko Banno | Japan | 1:04.21 | |

Heat 2

| Rank | Athlete | Country | Time | Notes |
|---|---|---|---|---|
| 1 | Kornelia Ender | East Germany | 1:01.03 | Q, OR |
| 2 | Andrea Pollack | East Germany | 1:01.39 | Q |
| 3 | Wendy Quirk | Canada | 1:01.54 | Q |
| 4 | Rosemarie Kother-Gabriel | East Germany | 1:01.93 | Q |
| 5 | LeLei Fonoimoana | United States | 1:02.23 | Q |
| 6 | María París | Costa Rica | 1:03.27 | |
| 7 | Yasue Hatsuda | Japan | 1:03.33 | |
| 8 | Sue Jenner | Great Britain | 1:04.06 | |

=== Final ===
| Rank | Athlete | Country | Time | Notes |
|---|---|---|---|---|
| 1 | Kornelia Ender | East Germany | 1:00.13 | =WR |
| 2 | Andrea Pollack | East Germany | 1:00.98 | |
| 3 | Wendy Boglioli | United States | 1:01.17 | |
| 4 | Camille Wright | United States | 1:01.41 | |
| 5 | Rosemarie Kother-Gabriel | East Germany | 1:01.56 | |
| 6 | Wendy Quirk | Canada | 1:01.75 | |
| 7 | LeLei Fonoimoana | United States | 1:01.95 | |
| 8 | Tamara Shelofastova | Soviet Union | 1:02.74 | |
