= Australia at the 2015 World Aquatics Championships =

- Flag of Australia
- World Aquatics code: AUS
- National federation: Swimming Australia
- Website: swimming.org.au

in Kazan, Russia
- Competitors: 89 in 5 sports
- Medals Ranked 4th: Gold 7 Silver 3 Bronze 8 Total 18

World Aquatics Championships appearances
- 1973; 1975; 1978; 1982; 1986; 1991; 1994; 1998; 2001; 2003; 2005; 2007; 2009; 2011; 2013; 2015; 2017; 2019; 2022; 2023; 2024; 2025

Australia competed at the 2015 World Aquatics Championships in Kazan, Russia from 24 July to 9 August 2015.

== Medalists ==
Medal	Name	Sport	Event	Date
Gold	Bronte Campbell; Cate Campbell; Emma McKeon; Melanie Schlanger*; Emily Seebohm; Madison Wilson*	Swimming	Women's 4×100 m freestyle relay	August 2
Gold	Emily Seebohm	Swimming	Women's 100 m backstroke	August 4
Gold	Mitch Larkin	Swimming	Men's 100 m backstroke	August 4
Gold	Bronte Campbell	Swimming	Women's 100 m freestyle	August 7
Gold	Mitch Larkin	Swimming	Men's 200 m backstroke	August 7
Gold	Emily Seebohm	Swimming	Women's 200 m backstroke	August 8
Gold	Bronte Campbell	Swimming	Women's 50 m freestyle	August 9
Silver	Madison Wilson	Swimming	Women's 200 m backstroke	August 8
Silver	Cameron McEvoy	Swimming	Men's 100 m freestyle	August 6
Silver	Kyle Chalmers*; Jayden Hadler; Mitch Larkin; Cameron McEvoy; David Morgan*; Jake Packard	Swimming	Men's 4×100 m medley relay	August 9
Bronze	Domonic Bedggood; Melissa Wu	Diving	Mixed 10 m synchronized platform	July 25
Bronze	Samantha Mills; Esther Qin	Diving	Women's 3 m synchronized springboard	July 25
Bronze	Jessica Ashwood	Swimming	Women's 400 m freestyle	August 2
Bronze	Mack Horton	Swimming	Men's 800 m freestyle	August 5
Bronze	Cate Campbell	Swimming	Women's 100 m freestyle	August 7
Bronze	Thomas Fraser-Holmes; Grant Hackett*; Kurt Herzog*; Cameron McEvoy; David McKeon; Daniel Smith*	Swimming	Men's 4×200 m freestyle relay	August 7
Bronze	Ben Treffers	Swimming	Men's 50 m backstroke	August 9
Bronze	Bronte Campbell; Madeline Groves*; Emma McKeon; Taylor McKeown; Emily Seebohm; Melanie Schlanger*; Lorna Tonks*; Madison Wilson*	Swimming	Women's 4×100 m medley relay	August 9

== Diving ==
Australia sent a team of eight divers to compete for the individual and synchronized events at the World Championships.

Men

Athlete	Event	Preliminaries		Semifinals		Final	
Athlete	Event	Points	Rank	Points	Rank	Points	Rank
James Connor	3 m springboard	431.85	10 Q	457.10	11 Q	422.35	11
Grant Nel	3 m springboard	450.30	8 Q	412.45	16	Did not advance	
Domonic Bedggood	10 m platform	441.50	13 Q	469.05	8 Q	470.40	8
James Connor	10 m platform	435.95	13 Q	427.75	13	Did not advance	
James Connor; Grant Nel	3 m synchronized springboard	384.87	10 Q	—N/a		387.69	12
Domonic Bedggood; James Connor	10 m synchronized platform	388.80	9 Q	—N/a		375.12	12

Women

Athlete	Event	Preliminaries		Semifinals		Final	
Athlete	Event	Points	Rank	Points	Rank	Points	Rank
Maddison Keeney	1 m springboard	283.40	4 Q	—N/a		226.05	12
Esther Qin	1 m springboard	261.60	6 Q	—N/a		280.50	5
Maddison Keeney	3 m springboard	305.55	9 Q	314.60	7 Q	326.60	7
Esther Qin	3 m springboard	329.10	4 Q	345.75	4 Q	347.20	4
Melissa Wu	10 m platform	320.80	11 Q	324.30	11 Q	364.20	5
Samantha Mills; Esther Qin	3 m synchronized springboard	291.90	3 Q	—N/a		304.20	3rd place, bronze medalist(s)
Lara Tarvit; Melissa Wu	10 m synchronized platform	294.84	6 Q	—N/a		302.22	8

Mixed

Athlete	Event	Final	
Athlete	Event	Points	Rank
Grant Nel; Maddison Keeney	3 m synchronized springboard	310.02	4
Domonic Bedggood; Melissa Wu	10 m synchronized platform	308.22	3rd place, bronze medalist(s)

== Open water swimming ==
Australia fielded a full team of eight swimmers to compete in the open water marathon.

Men

Athlete	Event	Time	Rank
Simon Huitenga	10 km	1:50:41.3	15
George O'Brien	10 km	1:51:19.6	28
Jarrod Poort	5 km	55:31.1	20
Jarrod Poort	25 km	5:07:44.5	17
Sam Sheppard	5 km	55:53.6	32
Sam Sheppard	25 km	4:56:22.9	6

Women

Athlete	Event	Time	Rank
Melissa Gorman	5 km	59:12.7	7
Chelsea Gubecka	10 km	1:58:51.3	13
Chelsea Gubecka	25 km	5:28:49.2	13
Kareena Lee	10 km	1:59:32.8	20
Jessica Walker	5 km	59:09.9	5
Jessica Walker	25 km	5:23:33.0	12

Mixed

Athlete	Event	Time	Rank
Melissa Gorman; Simon Huitenga; Jarrod Poort	Team	56:07.4	6

== Swimming ==
Australian swimmers earned qualifying standards in the following events (up to a maximum of 2 swimmers in each event at the A-standard entry time, and 1 at the B-standard): Swimmers must qualify at the 2015 Australian Championships (for pool events) to confirm their places for the Worlds.

Thirty-six swimmers (22 men and 24 women) have been selected to compete for the Australian team, including defending World champions Christian Sprenger in the 100 m breaststroke and Cate Campbell in the 100 m freestyle. 2012 Olympic silver medalist and two-time reigning World champion James Magnussen was set to compete, but later withdrew from the team because of a shoulder injury, having been ruled out to defend his Worlds title in the 100 m freestyle.

Men

Athlete	Event	Heat		Semifinal		Final	
Athlete	Event	Time	Rank	Time	Rank	Time	Rank
Matthew Abood	50 m freestyle	22.28	11 Q	22.16	14	Did not advance	
Josh Beaver	200 m backstroke	1:57.62	8 Q	1:57.99	13	Did not advance	
Tommaso D'Orsogna	100 m freestyle	49.04	18	Did not advance			
Tommaso D'Orsogna	100 m butterfly	52.22	15 Q	52.26	15	Did not advance	
Thomas Fraser-Holmes	200 m individual medley	1:59.96	13 Q	1:58.83	10	Did not advance	
Thomas Fraser-Holmes	400 m individual medley	4:15.93	10	—N/a		Did not advance	
Jayden Hadler	50 m butterfly	23.83	19	Did not advance			
Jayden Hadler	100 m butterfly	52.17	14 Q	52.09	12	Did not advance	
Mack Horton	400 m freestyle	3:47.37	11	—N/a		Did not advance	
Mack Horton	800 m freestyle	7:47.08	5 Q	—N/a		7:44.02	3rd place, bronze medalist(s)
Mack Horton	1500 m freestyle	15:00.51	11	—N/a		Did not advance	
Grant Irvine	200 m butterfly	1:56.92	=14 Q	1:57.94	15	Did not advance	
Mitch Larkin	50 m backstroke	24.77	4 Q	24.65	4 Q	24.70	4
Mitch Larkin	100 m backstroke	52.50 OC	1 Q	52.38 OC	1 Q	52.40	1st place, gold medalist(s)
Mitch Larkin	200 m backstroke	1:55.88	1 Q	1:54.29 OC	1 Q	1:53.58 OC	1st place, gold medalist(s)
Cameron McEvoy	100 m freestyle	48.33	2 Q	47.94	1 Q	47.95	2nd place, silver medalist(s)
Cameron McEvoy	200 m freestyle	1:46.39	4 Q	1:46.09	3 Q	1:47.26	8
David McKeon	200 m freestyle	1:47.00	10 Q	1:47.60	13	Did not advance	
David McKeon	400 m freestyle	3:47.36	10	—N/a		Did not advance	
David Morgan	200 m butterfly	1:56.05	8 Q	1:58.83	16	Did not advance	
Jake Packard	100 m breaststroke	59.92	9 Q	59.66	7 Q	59.44	5
Christian Sprenger	50 m breaststroke	27.54	17	Did not advance			
Christian Sprenger	100 m breaststroke	1:01.13	28	Did not advance			
Ben Treffers	50 m backstroke	24.74	3 Q	24.64	3 Q	24.69	3rd place, bronze medalist(s)
Ben Treffers	100 m backstroke	54.00	15 Q	DSQ		Did not advance	
Tommaso D'Orsogna; Kyle Chalmers; Matthew Abood; Ashley Delaney	4×100 m freestyle relay	3:16.34	13	—N/a		Did not advance	
Cameron McEvoy; David McKeon; Daniel Smith; Thomas Fraser-Holmes; Grant Hackett*; Kurt Herzog*	4×200 m freestyle relay	7:08.40	1 Q	—N/a		7:05.34	3rd place, bronze medalist(s)
Kyle Chalmers; Jayden Hadler; Mitch Larkin; Cameron McEvoy; David Morgan*; Jake Packard	4×100 m medley relay	3:31.86	2 Q	—N/a		3:30.08	2nd place, silver medalist(s)

Women

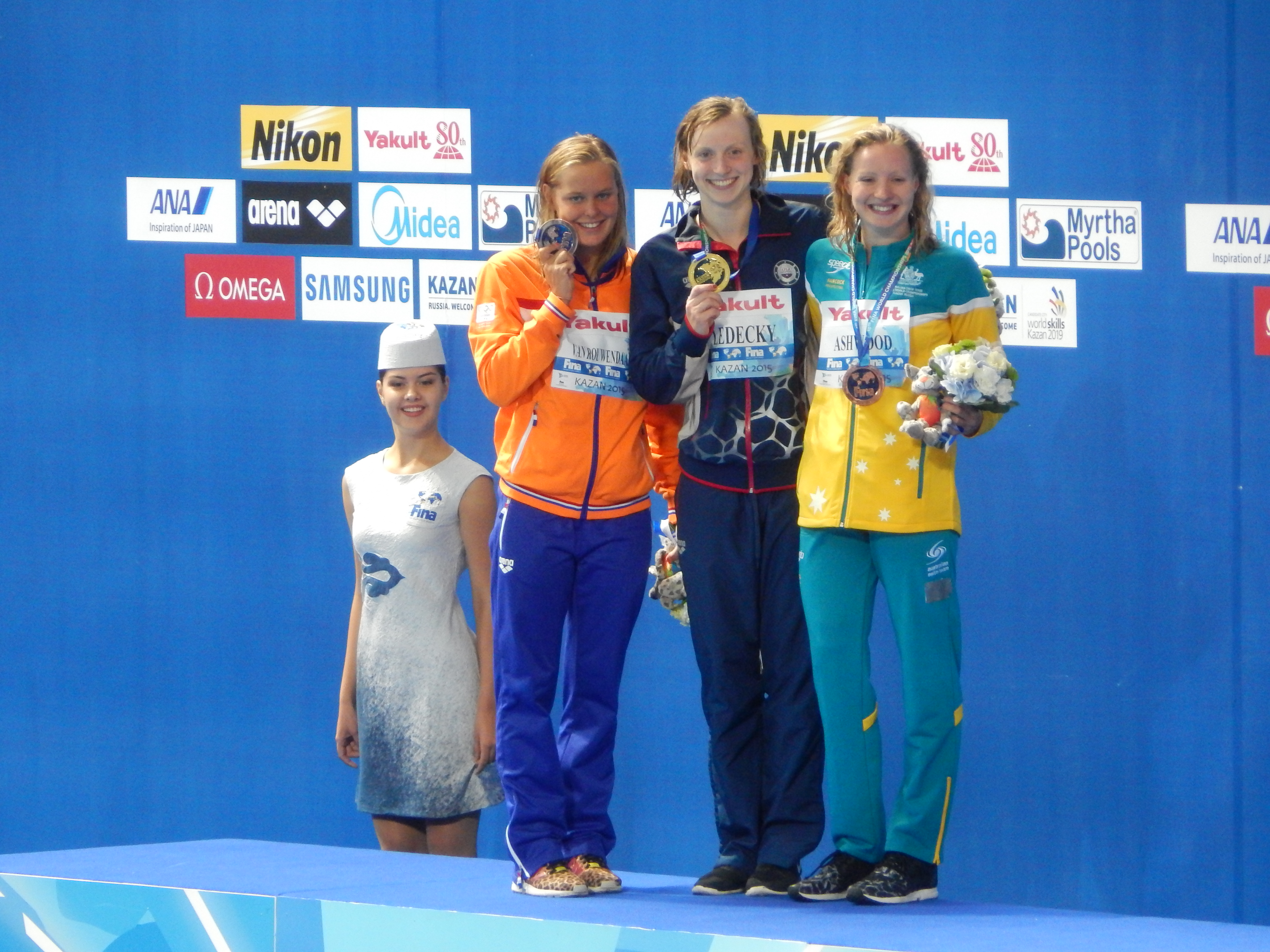
Victory Ceremony 400m freestyle

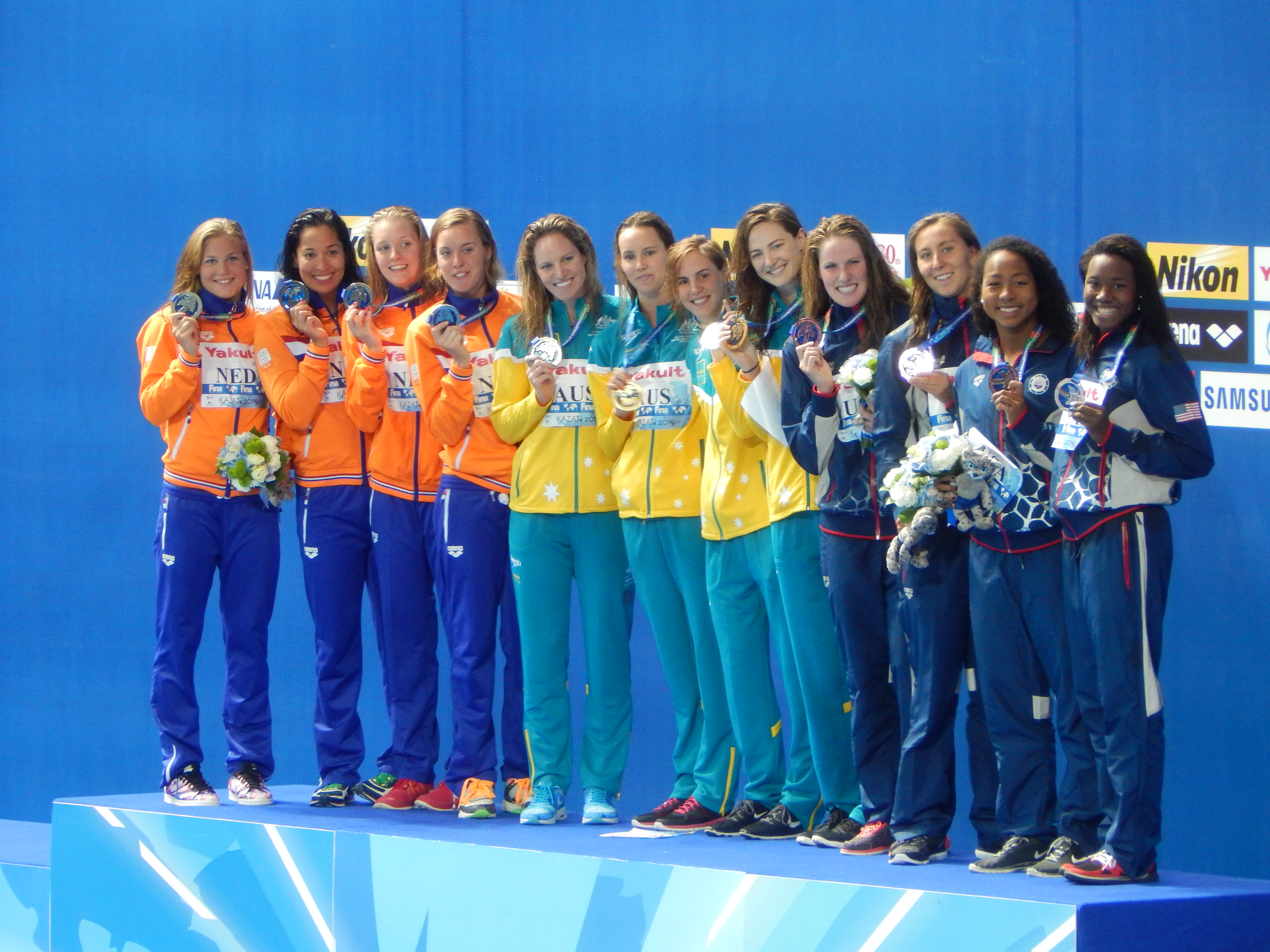
Victory Ceremony 4×100 metres freestyle relay

Athlete	Event	Heat		Semifinal		Final	
Athlete	Event	Time	Rank	Time	Rank	Time	Rank
Jessica Ashwood	400 m freestyle	4:04.47	2 Q	—N/a		4:03.34 OC	3rd place, bronze medalist(s)
Jessica Ashwood	800 m freestyle	8:22.17	2 Q	—N/a		8:18.41	4
Jessica Ashwood	1500 m freestyle	15:56.52	3 Q	—N/a		15:52.17 NR	4
Hayley Baker	200 m backstroke	2:11.63	17	Did not advance			
Bronte Campbell	50 m freestyle	24.74	7 Q	24.32	4 Q	24.12	1st place, gold medalist(s)
Bronte Campbell	100 m freestyle	53.50	3 Q	53.00	3 Q	52.52	1st place, gold medalist(s)
Cate Campbell	50 m freestyle	24.40	1 Q	24.22	1 Q	24.36	4
Cate Campbell	100 m freestyle	53.22	=1 Q	52.84	2 Q	52.82	3rd place, bronze medalist(s)
Madeline Groves	100 m butterfly	58.31	10 Q	58.17	11	Did not advance	
Madeline Groves	200 m butterfly	2:08.65	9 Q	2:08.00	9	Did not advance	
Emma McKeon	200 m freestyle	1:57.78	7 Q	1:56.95	8 Q	1:56.41	7
Emma McKeon	50 m butterfly	26.79	=21	Did not advance			
Emma McKeon	100 m butterfly	58.12	8 Q	57.59	5 Q	57.67	4
Taylor McKeown	100 m breaststroke	1:06.97	7 Q	1:07.19	9	Did not advance	
Taylor McKeown	200 m breaststroke	2:24.02	9 Q	2:24.41	11	Did not advance	
Keryn McMaster	200 m individual medley	2:13.42	17	Did not advance			
Keryn McMaster	400 m individual medley	4:39.05	13	—N/a		Did not advance	
Leah Neale	400 m freestyle	4:13.98	21	—N/a		Did not advance	
Leah Neale	800 m freestyle	8:44.38	26	—N/a		Did not advance	
Melanie Schlanger	200 m freestyle	1:58.94	17	Did not advance			
Emily Seebohm	50 m backstroke	27.75	3 Q	27.70	5 Q	27.66	4
Emily Seebohm	100 m backstroke	59.04	2 Q	58.56	1 Q	58.26	1st place, gold medalist(s)
Emily Seebohm	200 m backstroke	2:09.44	7 Q	2:06.56	2 Q	2:05.81	1st place, gold medalist(s)
Brianna Throssell	50 m butterfly	26.90	=26	Did not advance			
Brianna Throssell	200 m butterfly	2:09.16	12 Q	2:07.57	=6 Q	2:06.78	=4
Lorna Tonks	50 m breaststroke	21.22	16 Q	31.05	12	Did not advance	
Lorna Tonks	100 m breaststroke	1:07.32	12 Q	1:07.54	13	Did not advance	
Tessa Wallace	200 m breaststroke	2:24.88	12 Q	2:24.68	12	Did not advance	
Tessa Wallace	400 m individual medley	4:44.93	21	—N/a		Did not advance	
Madison Wilson	50 m backstroke	28.02	=7 Q	27.83	6 Q	27.92	6
Madison Wilson	100 m backstroke	59.17	3 Q	59.05	3 Q	58.75	2nd place, silver medalist(s)
Emily Seebohm; Emma McKeon; Bronte Campbell; Cate Campbell; Madison Wilson*; Melanie Schlanger*; Bronte Barratt*	4×100 m freestyle relay	3:35.86	2 Q	—N/a		3:31.48	1st place, gold medalist(s)
Bronte Barratt; Jessica Ashwood; Leah Neale; Emma McKeon	4×200 m freestyle relay	7:52.66	3 Q	—N/a		7:51.02	6
Bronte Campbell; Madeline Groves*; Emma McKeon; Taylor McKeown; Emily Seebohm; Melanie Schlanger*; Lorna Tonks*; Madison Wilson*	4×100 m medley relay	3:57.95	4 Q	—N/a		3:55.56	3rd place, bronze medalist(s)

== Synchronized swimming ==
Australia has qualified a squad of eleven synchronized swimmers for the following events.

Athlete	Event	Preliminaries		Final	
Athlete	Event	Points	Rank	Points	Rank
Bianca Hammett; Nikita Pablo	Duet technical routine	72.0011	28	Did not advance	
Bianca Hammett; Nikita Pablo	Duet free routine	73.1667	30	Did not advance	
Bianca Hammett; Danielle Kettlewell; Jo-Ann Lim; Nikita Pablo; Emily Rogers; Cristina Sheehan; Jemma Singleton; Danielle ten Vaanholt*; Deborah Tsai*; Amie Thompson	Team technical routine	70.8602	20	Did not advance	
Hannah Cross*; Bianca Hammett; Danielle Kettlewell; Nikita Pablo; Emily Rogers; Cristina Sheehan*; Jemma Singleton; Danielle ten Vaanholt; Deborah Tsai; Amie Thompson	Team free routine	75.1000	16	Did not advance	

== Water polo ==
=== Men's tournament ===
Team roster

- James Stanton-French
- Richard Campbell
- George Ford
- John Cotterill
- Nathan Power
- Jarrod Gilchrist
- Aiden Roach
- Aaron Younger
- Joel Swift
- Mitchell Emery
- Rhys Howden
- Tyler Martin
- Joel Dennerley

Group play

Pos	Team	Pld	W	D	L	GF	GA	GD	Pts	Qualification
1	Serbia	3	3	0	0	40	26	+14	6	Advanced to quarterfinals
2	Australia	3	1	1	1	24	19	+5	3	Advanced to playoffs
3	Montenegro	3	1	1	1	29	26	+3	3	Advanced to playoffs
4	Japan	3	0	0	3	23	45	−22	0	

Source: SportResult.com
Rules for classification: 1) points; 2) head-to-head points; 3) head-to-head goal difference; 4) head-to-head number of goals scored; 5) goal difference.

27 July 2015; 21:30	Report	Japan	4–10	Australia	Kazan; Attendance: 2,287; Referees: Massimiliano Caputi (ITA), Hatem Gaber (EGY)
27 July 2015; 21:30	Report	Score by quarters: 0–2, 2–2, 1–3, 1–3			Kazan; Attendance: 2,287; Referees: Massimiliano Caputi (ITA), Hatem Gaber (EGY)
27 July 2015; 21:30	Report	four players 1	Goals	Campbell 3	Kazan; Attendance: 2,287; Referees: Massimiliano Caputi (ITA), Hatem Gaber (EGY)

29 July 2015; 13:30	Report	Australia	5–5	Montenegro	Kazan; Attendance: 313; Referees: Boris Margeta (SLO), Sergey Naumov (RUS)
29 July 2015; 13:30	Report	Score by quarters: 0–2, 1–1, 1–1, 3–1			Kazan; Attendance: 313; Referees: Boris Margeta (SLO), Sergey Naumov (RUS)
29 July 2015; 13:30	Report	Younger 3	Goals	Janović 2	Kazan; Attendance: 313; Referees: Boris Margeta (SLO), Sergey Naumov (RUS)

31 July 2015; 12:10	Report	Serbia	10–9	Australia	Kazan; Attendance: 890; Referees: Radosław Koryzna (POL), Georgios Stacridis (GRE)
31 July 2015; 12:10	Report	Score by quarters: 3–2, 2–2, 1–4, 4–1			Kazan; Attendance: 890; Referees: Radosław Koryzna (POL), Georgios Stacridis (GRE)
31 July 2015; 12:10	Report	three players 2	Goals	Younger 3	Kazan; Attendance: 890; Referees: Radosław Koryzna (POL), Georgios Stacridis (GRE)

Playoffs

2 August 2015; 20:10	Report	South Africa	1–17	Australia	Kazan; Attendance: 213; Referees: Ni Shi Wei (CHN), German Moller (ARG)
2 August 2015; 20:10	Report	Score by quarters: 1–5, 0–6, 0–2, 0–4			Kazan; Attendance: 213; Referees: Ni Shi Wei (CHN), German Moller (ARG)
2 August 2015; 20:10	Report	E. Le Roux 1	Goals	Younger 4	Kazan; Attendance: 213; Referees: Ni Shi Wei (CHN), German Moller (ARG)

Quarterfinals

4 August 2015; 18:50	Report	Greece	7–7 (PSO)	Australia	Kazan; Attendance: 1,996; Referees: Boris Margeta (SLO), Vojin Putniković (SRB)
4 August 2015; 18:50	Report	Score by quarters: 1–0, 1–3, 3–1, 2–3 PSO: 5–4			Kazan; Attendance: 1,996; Referees: Boris Margeta (SLO), Vojin Putniković (SRB)
4 August 2015; 18:50	Report	Fountoulis, Genidounias 2	Goals	Younger 3	Kazan; Attendance: 1,996; Referees: Boris Margeta (SLO), Vojin Putniković (SRB)

5th–8th place semifinals

6 August 2015; 15:30	Report	Montenegro	11–8	Australia	Kazan; Attendance: 1,500; Referees: Francesc Buch (ESP), Vojin Putniković (SRB)
6 August 2015; 15:30	Report	Score by quarters: 4–1, 1–1, 4–4, 2–2			Kazan; Attendance: 1,500; Referees: Francesc Buch (ESP), Vojin Putniković (SRB)
6 August 2015; 15:30	Report	Janović 4	Goals	three players 2	Kazan; Attendance: 1,500; Referees: Francesc Buch (ESP), Vojin Putniković (SRB)

Seventh place game

8 August 2015; 14:00	Report	Australia	6–10	United States	Kazan; Attendance: 1,677; Referees: Nenad Peris (CRO), Francesc Buch (ESP)
8 August 2015; 14:00	Report	Score by quarters: 3–2, 0–2, 1–4, 2–2			Kazan; Attendance: 1,677; Referees: Nenad Peris (CRO), Francesc Buch (ESP)
8 August 2015; 14:00	Report	Younger 2	Goals	Azevedo 4	Kazan; Attendance: 1,677; Referees: Nenad Peris (CRO), Francesc Buch (ESP)

=== Women's tournament ===
Team roster

- Lea Yanitsas
- Gemma Beadsworth
- Hannah Buckling
- Holly Lincoln-Smith
- Keesja Gofers
- Bronwen Knox
- Rowie Webster
- Glennie McGhie
- Zoe Arancini
- Ash Southern
- Bronte Halligan
- Nicola Zagame
- Kelsey Wakefield

Group play

Pos	Team	Pld	W	D	L	GF	GA	GD	Pts	Qualification
1	Australia	3	3	0	0	35	14	+21	6	Advanced to quarterfinals
2	Netherlands	3	2	0	1	38	18	+20	4	Advanced to playoffs
3	Greece	3	1	0	2	36	22	+14	2	Advanced to playoffs
4	South Africa	3	0	0	3	6	61	−55	0	

Source: SportResult.com
Rules for classification: 1) points; 2) head-to-head points; 3) head-to-head goal difference; 4) head-to-head number of goals scored; 5) goal difference.

26 July 2015; 12:10	Report	Australia	8–7	Greece	Kazan; Attendance: 1,035; Referees: Massimiliano Caputi (ITA), Sergey Naumov (RUS)
26 July 2015; 12:10	Report	Score by quarters: 2–1, 1–3, 2–1, 3–2			Kazan; Attendance: 1,035; Referees: Massimiliano Caputi (ITA), Sergey Naumov (RUS)
26 July 2015; 12:10	Report	Zagame 2	Goals	Tsoukala 4	Kazan; Attendance: 1,035; Referees: Massimiliano Caputi (ITA), Sergey Naumov (RUS)

28 July 2015; 10:50	Report	Australia	19–1	South Africa	Kazan; Attendance: 456; Referees: Anne Grandin (FRA), Tadao Tahara (JPN)
28 July 2015; 10:50	Report	Score by quarters: 6–0, 3–1, 7–0, 3–0			Kazan; Attendance: 456; Referees: Anne Grandin (FRA), Tadao Tahara (JPN)
28 July 2015; 10:50	Report	Southern 5	Goals	Versfeld 1	Kazan; Attendance: 456; Referees: Anne Grandin (FRA), Tadao Tahara (JPN)

30 July 2015; 20:10	Report	Australia	8–6	Netherlands	Kazan; Attendance: 230; Referees: Massimiliano Caputi (ITA), Boris Margeta (SLO)
30 July 2015; 20:10	Report	Score by quarters: 2–0, 2–2, 3–2, 1–2			Kazan; Attendance: 230; Referees: Massimiliano Caputi (ITA), Boris Margeta (SLO)
30 July 2015; 20:10	Report	Southern, Zagame 2	Goals	Sevenich 2	Kazan; Attendance: 230; Referees: Massimiliano Caputi (ITA), Boris Margeta (SLO)

Quarterfinals

3 August 2015; 20:10	Report	Australia	7–7 (PSO)	China	Kazan; Attendance: 370; Referees: Francesc Buch (ESP), Vojin Putniković (SRB)
3 August 2015; 20:10	Report	Score by quarters: 2–3, 0–1, 4–2, 1–1 PSO: 5–3			Kazan; Attendance: 370; Referees: Francesc Buch (ESP), Vojin Putniković (SRB)
3 August 2015; 20:10	Report	seven players 1	Goals	Song Donglun, Zhao Zihan 2	Kazan; Attendance: 370; Referees: Francesc Buch (ESP), Vojin Putniković (SRB)

Semifinals

5 August 2015; 20:30	Report	United States	8–6	Australia	Kazan; Attendance: 1,007; Referees: Boris Margeta (SLO), Georgios Stavridis (GRE)
5 August 2015; 20:30	Report	Score by quarters: 2–2, 3–3, 1–0, 2–1			Kazan; Attendance: 1,007; Referees: Boris Margeta (SLO), Georgios Stavridis (GRE)
5 August 2015; 20:30	Report	Fattal, Steffens 2	Goals	six players 1	Kazan; Attendance: 1,007; Referees: Boris Margeta (SLO), Georgios Stavridis (GRE)

Third place game

7 August 2015; 20:30	Report	Australia	7–7 (PSO)	Italy	Kazan; Attendance: 1,508; Referees: Francesc Buch (ESP), Vojin Putniković (SRB)
7 August 2015; 20:30	Report	Score by quarters: 2–3, 1–2, 2–0, 2–2 PSO: 3–5			Kazan; Attendance: 1,508; Referees: Francesc Buch (ESP), Vojin Putniković (SRB)
7 August 2015; 20:30	Report	Southern, Webster 2	Goals	Di Mario 3	Kazan; Attendance: 1,508; Referees: Francesc Buch (ESP), Vojin Putniković (SRB)
