= Þórunn =

Þórunn is an Icelandic feminine given name. Notable people with the name include:

- Þórunn Alfreðsdóttir (born 1960), Icelandic swimmer
- Þórunn Erna Clausen (born 1975), Icelandic actress and songwriter
- Þórunn Egilsdóttir (1964–2021), Icelandic politician
- Þórunn Jónassen (1850–1922), Icelandic feminist and women's association chair
- Þórunn Helga Jónsdóttir (born 1984), Icelandic footballer
- Þórunn Arna Kristjánsdóttir (born 1983), Icelandic actress and singer
- Þórunn Elfa Magnúsdóttir (1910–1995), Icelandic writer
- Þórunn Sveinbjarnardóttir (born 1965), Icelandic politician
- Þórunn Þórðardóttir (1925–2007), Icelandic scientist
