= Alfreðsdóttir =

Alfreðsdóttir is an Icelandic patronymic. Notable people with the patronymic include:

- Lilja Dögg Alfreðsdóttir (born 1973), Icelandic politician
- Þórunn Alfreðsdóttir (born 1960), Icelandic butterfly swimmer
