= Zuzana Marková =

Zuzana Marková may refer to:

- Zuzana Marková (swimmer)
- Zuzana Marková (soprano)
