= Claudia Clevenger =

American swimmer (born 1955)

Personal information
- Full name: Claudia Jean Clevenger
- National team: United States
- Born: January 19, 1955 (age 71) San Jose, California, U.S.
- Occupation: Bookeeper
- Height: 5 ft 5 in (1.65 m)
- Weight: 130 lb (59 kg)

Sport
- Sport: Swimming
- Event: 100, 200 breast
- Strokes: Breaststroke
- Club: DeAnza Swim Club
- Coach: Lash Turville (DeAnza SC); Sherm Chavoor (72 Olympics)

Claudia Jean Clevenger (born January 19, 1955), also known by her married name Claudia Hernandez, is an American former competition swimmer and world record-holder. She represented the United States at the 1972 Summer Olympics in Munich, Germany.

Clevenger was born on January 19, 1955 in San Jose, California. During her high school years, she swam for the large and highly competitive DeAnza Swim Club in Cupertino, California, where she was coached by Lash Turville, who helped found the team and coached it from 1969 to 1973. During Turville's coaching tenure at DeAnza, the Club became the largest in the country, approaching nearly 600 members.

Clevenger set a National Junior Olympics record with a time of 4:46.3 while swimming as part of a 400 Medley Relay in San Diego on August 21, 1969. At the Los Angeles Invitational Swimming Championships on August 1, 1970, Clevenger broke the meet record time in the 100-meter breaststroke with a 1:16.4 in the finals. An outstanding and nationally recognized breaststroker, she captured the American Athletic Union (AAU) title in the 200 metre breaststroke in 1970, and at the 1971 American Athletic Union outdoor meet, she placed second in the 100 meter breast.

At the prestigious Santa Clara Invitational in June, 1972, Clevenger won the 100-meter breaststroke event with a meet record time of 1:16.1, beating a former record of 1:16.4 set by Russian Galina Stepanova.

== 1972 Munich Olympics ==
At the August 3, 1972 Olympic Swim Trials in Chicago, in a relatively close finish, Clevenger placed second in the 200-meter breaststroke behind Dana Schoenfield. Clevenger swam a 2:44.60, to Schoenfield's winning 2:43.71.

In a close finish on August 29 at the 1972 Munich Olympics, Clevinger eclipsed her time in the Olympic trails, and finished fourth in the final of the women's 200-meter breaststroke with a time of 2:42.88, only .12 seconds out of bronze medal contention. Beverly Whitfield of Australia finished first taking the gold with a 2:41.71, and American rival Dana Shoenfield finished second with a 2:42.05, while Galina Stepinova of the Russian team finished third with a time of 2:42.36. Though Clevinger was second on the last 50 meter turn of the event, Dana Shoenfield passed the leader and favorite Galina Stepinova, and Australian Beverly Whitfield, not favored to place, passed the leaders in the final five meters of the race, leaving Clevinger to finish fourth. California coach Sherm Chavoor was the head U.S. women's coach in 1972.

According to her World Aquatics profile, Clevenger may have also participated in the preliminaries of the 50 and 100-meter breaststroke events at the 1972 Munich Olympics on August 29. Her time in the 50 breaststroke was recorded as 37.46, and in the 100 breaststroke, 1:19.64.

=== World record ===
Clevinger swam on an American team in Minsk, Russia, that set a world record in the 4×100 meter medley relay with a time of 4:27.3 on September 11, 1971, which held through August 18, 1972.

== Personal life ==
Clevenger attended De Anza College from 1973 to 1974.

After her swimming career, she worked as a book keeper and remained active in the DeAnza Swim Club Alumni Group.

== See also ==
- World record progression 4 × 100 metres medley relay
