= Kuniko =

- Gender: Female

Origin
- Origin: Japanese
- Meaning: Different meanings depending on the kanji used

Kuniko (written: 邦子, 國子, 国子, or 久仁子) is a feminine Japanese given name. Notable people with the name include:

- Princess Kuniko (邦子 内親王) (1209–1283), Empress of Japan
- Kuniko Asagi (麻木 久仁子) (born 1962), Japanese actress and television presenter
- Kuniko Banno (坂野 邦子; born 1957), Japanese swimmer
- Kuniko Inoguchi (猪口 邦子) (born 1952), Japanese politician
- Kuniko Koda (行田 邦子) (born 1965), Japanese politician
- Kuniko Miyake (三宅 邦子) (1916–1992), Japanese actress
- Kuniko Mukōda (向田 邦子) (1929–1981), Japanese writer and screenwriter
- Kuniko Obinata (大日方 邦子) (born 1972), Japanese Paralympic alpine skier
- Kuniko Ozaki (born 1956), Japanese judge
- Kuniko Tanioka (谷岡 郁子) (born 1954), Japanese politician
- Kuniko Tsurita (つりたくにこ) (1947–1985), Japanese manga artist

== Fictional characters ==
- Kuniko Hōjō (北条 國子), protagonist of the light novel series Shangri-La

== See also ==
- 7189 Kuniko, a main-belt asteroid
