= Ougrée =

Section of Seraing, Belgium

Coordinates: 50.5947°N 5.5361°E

Ougrée Ougrêye
- Town
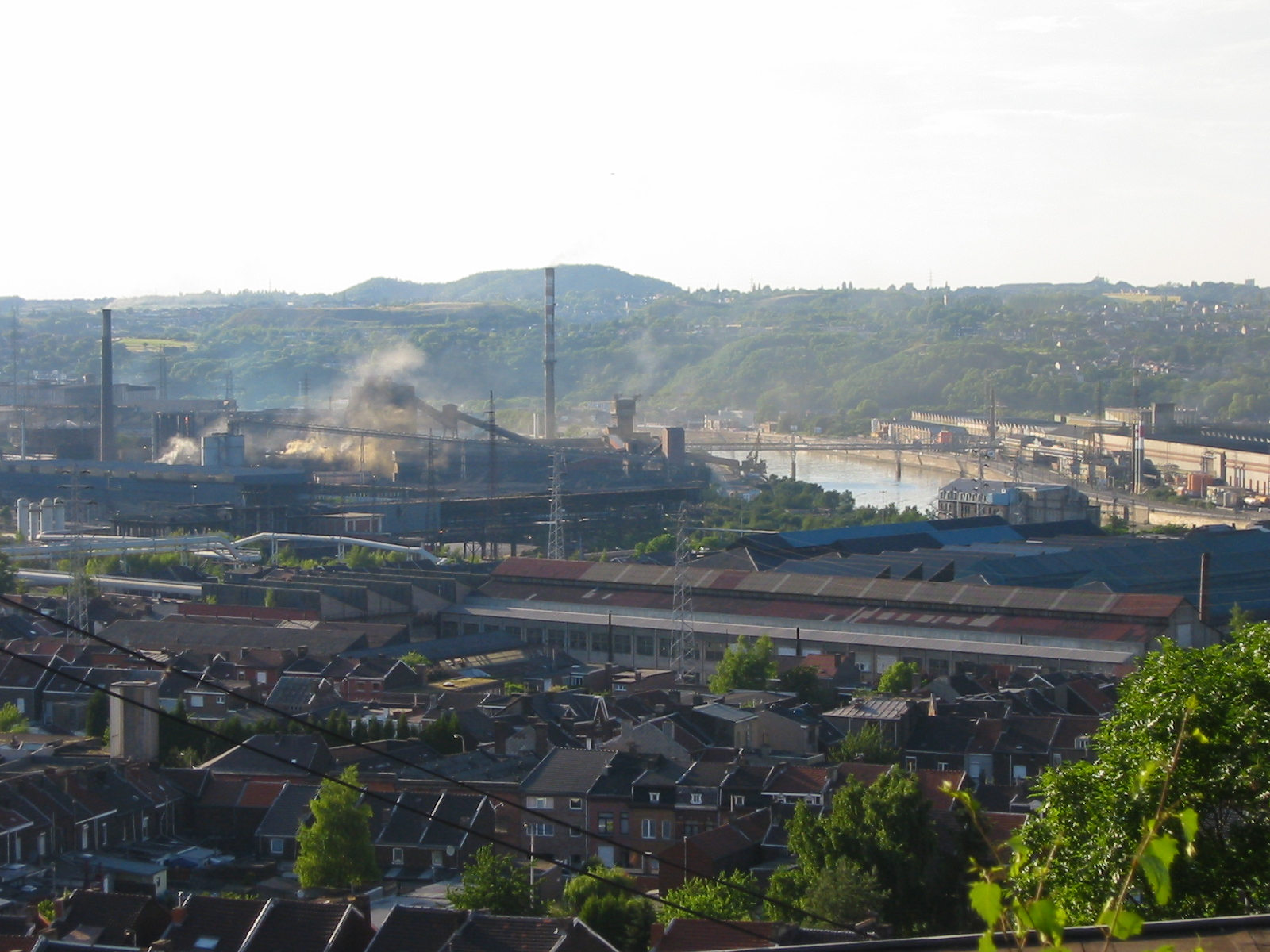
- View over the Cockerill-Ougrée steel works
- Interactive map of Ougrée
- Country: Belgium
- Region: Wallonia
- Province: Liège
- Municipality: Seraing
- Postal code: 4102
- NIS code: 62096(C)

Ougrée (French pronunciation: [uɡʁe]; Walloon: Ougrêye) is a town of Wallonia and a district of the municipality of Seraing, located in the province of Liège, Belgium.

It was a separate municipality before the merging of municipalities in 1977. Olympic swimmers Béatrice Mottoulle and Chantal Grimard were both born here. Belgian football goalkeeper Michel Preud'Homme was also born here as well as writer Franz Weyergans in 1912.
