= Lyubov Rusanova =

Russian swimmer

Personal information
- Born: 2 February 1954 (age 72) Krasnodar, Russian SFSR, Soviet Union
- Height: 1.65 m (5 ft 5 in)
- Weight: 65 kg (143 lb)

Sport
- Sport: Swimming
- Club: Dynamo Krasnodar
Medal record
Representing Soviet Union
Summer Olympics
Silver medal – second place	1976 Montreal	100 m breaststroke
Bronze medal – third place	1976 Montreal	200 m breaststroke
World Championships
Silver medal – second place	1973 Belgrade	100 m breaststroke
Summer Universiade
Gold medal – first place	1973 Moscow	100 m breaststroke

Lyubov Petrovna Rusanova (Russian: Любовь Петровна Русанова; born 2 February 1954) is a retired Russian swimmer who won two medals in the 100 and 200 m breaststroke events at the 1976 Summer Olympics. She also won a silver medal in the 100 m breaststroke at the 1973 World Aquatics Championships.

Her father was a locksmith and mother worked at a kindergarten. They had four children: elder brothers Vasily and Nikolai, and twins Anatoly and Lyubov; all four competed in swimming, though brother Anatoly quit at a young age. There was no pool in Krasnodar until 1967, and therefore they trained in the Kuban River, which was heated all through the year by the nearby thermal power station. She graduated from the Kuban State University of Physical Education in Krasnodar. After retiring in 1976 she worked as a swimming coach. In the 2000s she was still competing in the masters category.
