= Rose-Marie Pepe =

Canadian swimmer

Personal information
- Born: 23 April 1954 (age 72) Vancouver, British Columbia, Canada

Sport
- Sport: Swimming

Rose-Marie Pepe (born 23 April 1954) is a Canadian swimmer. She competed in the women's 200 metre breaststroke at the 1972 Summer Olympics.
