= Lyle Smith (swimmer) =

Australian swimmer (born 1958)

Personal information
- Born: 3 March 1958 (age 68)

Sport
- Sport: Swimming

Lyle Smith (born 3 March 1958) is an Australian former swimmer. She competed in the women's 100 metre butterfly at the 1976 Summer Olympics.
