= Þórunn Þórðardóttir HF 300 =

Icelandic research vessel

Þórunn Þórðardóttir HF 300 is a research vessel belonging to the Marine and Freshwater Research Institute in Iceland. It replaced Bjarni Sæmundsson HF 30 which served as their marine research vessel from 1970 until 2025.

The ship was built in Spain and was launched in January 2024. It underwent navigation and equipment tests in November 2024.

The ship was named after Þórunn Þórðardóttir, who was a marine biologist who pioneered research on planktonic algae and primary production in the seas around Iceland.

The ship is 69.80 meters long and 13.20 meters wide.

== See also ==
- List of research vessels by country
