= Dana Schoenfield =

American competition swimmer (born 1953)

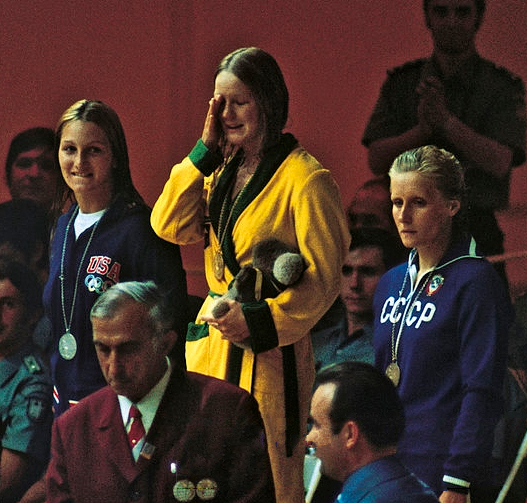
- Schoenfield, Beverley Whitfield and Galina Prozumenshchikova at 1972 Olympics

Personal information
- Full name: Dana Lee Schoenfield
- National team: United States
- Born: August 13, 1953 (age 72) Harvey, Illinois, U.S.
- Height: 5 ft 8 in (1.73 m)
- Weight: 146 lb (66 kg)

Sport
- Sport: Swimming
- Strokes: Breaststroke
- Club: Orange County Cypress Athletic Club
- College team: University of California, Los Angeles
Medal record
Women's swimming
Representing the United States
Olympic Games
Silver medal – second place	1972 Munich	200 m breaststroke

Dana Lee Schoenfield (born August 13, 1953) is an American former competition swimmer who won a silver medal in the 200-metre breaststroke at the 1972 Munich Olympic Games.

== Early life ==
Schoenfield was born in Harvey, Illinois, and spent her childhood in Schererville, Indiana. She first learned to swim at the local Sherwood Golf and Swim Club, where she began to excel in the breaststroke. Her family relocated to Anaheim, California in 1963 where she, along with her brother Michael, actively swam on the Disneyland Hotel Swim Team. She qualified for the Women's Senior National Championships in the 200-meter breaststroke at age 12, the youngest swimmer to participate. As a 14-year-old, Schoenfield was the second fastest women's 200 meter breaststroke swimmer in the country, and just missed making the U.S. team for the 1968 Summer Olympics. After semi-retiring for the next three years, she was a varsity cheerleader for Loara High School in Anaheim, California.

== 1972 Summer Olympic Games ==
After graduation, Schoenfield, along with her swim coach Ray Woods, began a one-year regimen of serious training in an effort to make the U.S. team for the 1972 Summer Olympics. At the 1972 U.S. Olympic Trials, she qualified first in the 200-meter breaststroke, with a personal best time of 2:43.7. At the 1972 Olympics in Munich, she was not expected to contend for a medal as she had just the fourth fastest time and ranking for 1972. She placed fourth in the qualifying heats, and was in lane 6 for the Munich final. With her swim idol, Galina Prozumenschikova of the Soviet Union, swimming in lane 3, she out-touched Prozumenschikova with a time of 2:42.03, another personal best. Australian Beverley Whitfield, on the outside No. 7 lane, beat Schoenfield for the gold medal at 2:41.7.

== College career ==
After the 1972 Olympics, Schoenfield attended University of California, Los Angeles (UCLA), where she helped start the UCLA Bruins women's swimming team under the auspices of the Association for Intercollegiate Athletics for Women (AIAW). In 1973, she qualified for the World University Games in Moscow, Russia. Afterward, retiring from swimming, she was selected to the 1975–76 UCLA Spirit Squad as a songgirl/dance team member, where she performed at the 1976 Rose Bowl and the NCAA men's basketball Final Four. She met her husband, Bob Reyes, a UCLA football player, when they shared their first kiss after the Rose Bowl win.

== Later years ==
Schoenfield and her husband Bob Reyes have two daughters, Taylor and Sammee. The family now resides in Dana Point, California. She is a swim coach and dean at Santa Margarita Catholic High School in Rancho Santa Margarita, California.

Schoenfield appeared as Dana Reyes on The $25,000 Pyramid for 2 days. She won $3,900 in her first appearance on the show in 1985. The next day her opponent beat her out.

== See also ==
- List of University of California, Los Angeles people
- List of Olympic medalists in swimming (women)
