= Dagmar Sierck =

German swimmer

Personal information
- Born: 14 March 1958 Bad Bodenteich, Germany
- Died: 17 July 2015 (aged 57)

Sport
- Sport: Swimming

Dagmar Sierck (14 March 1958 – 17 July 2015) was a German swimmer. She competed in the women's 100 metre breaststroke at the 1972 Summer Olympics.
