= Miriam Hopkins (swimmer) =

Irish swimmer

Personal information
- Born: 28 October 1960 (age 65)

Sport
- Sport: Swimming

Miriam Hopkins (born 28 October 1960) is an Irish former swimmer. She competed in the women's 200 metre butterfly at the 1976 Summer Olympics.
