= Patricia Siewert =

German swimmer

Personal information
- Born: 23 September 1956 (age 69) Heilbronn, Germany

Sport
- Sport: Swimming

Patricia Siewert (born 23 September 1956) is a German former swimmer. She competed in the women's 100 metre breaststroke at the 1972 Summer Olympics.
