= Nira Windeatt =

Australian swimmer

Personal information
- Nationality: Australian
- Born: 7 December 1958 (age 67)

Sport
- Sport: Swimming

Nira Windeatt (Nira Stove; born 7 December 1958) is an Australian former swimmer. She competed in the women's 100 metre butterfly at the 1976 Summer Olympics.

She married Graham Windeatt in 1979 and has two children with him.
