= Deborah Tsai =

Australian synchronised swimmer

Personal information
- Full name: Deborah Jiahui Tsai
- Born: 18 December 1994 (age 31) Singapore

Sport
- Sport: Swimming
- Strokes: Synchronised swimming

Deborah Jiahui Tsai (born 18 December 1994) is an Australian synchronised swimmer. She competed in the team event at the 2016 Summer Olympics. Tsai attended All Saints' College, Perth.
