= Þórunn Þórðardóttir =

Icelandic scientist (1925–2007)

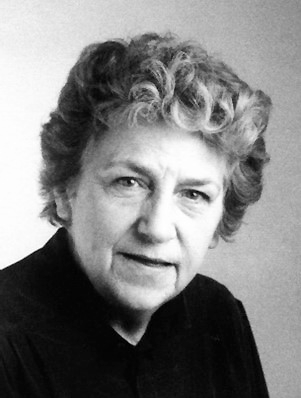
- Born: May 15, 1925; Reykjavik, Iceland
- Died: December 11, 2007 (aged 82)
- Occupations: Marine Biologist, Specialist in algae
- Known for: Pioneer in research on planktonic algae and primary productivity in the seas around Iceland.

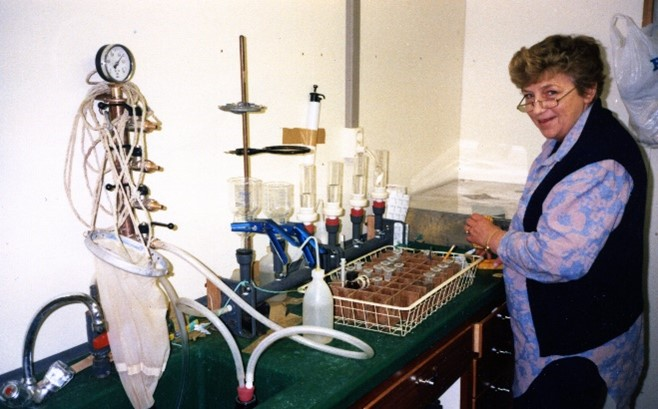
Þórunn Þórðardóttir performing an experiment on algae aboard Bjarni Sæmundsson HF 30

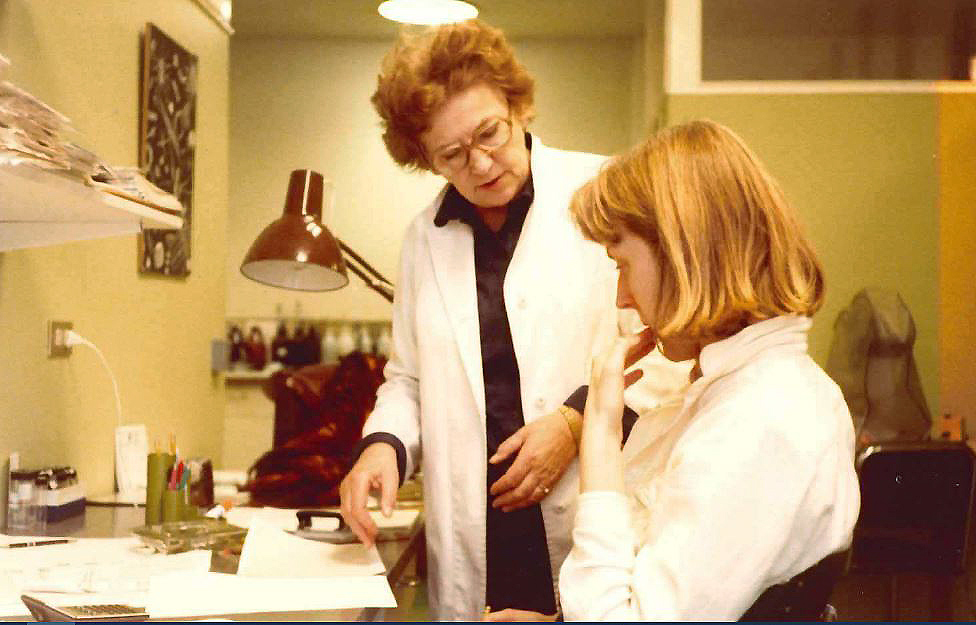
Þórunn teaching in the laboratory

Þórunn Þórðardóttir (15 May 1925 – 11 December 2007) was a researcher on planktonic algae and primary productivity in the ocean around Iceland. Þórunn worked her entire career at the Marine and Freshwater Research Institute in Iceland.

== Education ==
Þórunn was born in Reykjavik, Iceland on May 15, 1925. She graduated from Reykjavík Junior College in 1944. After that, she began studying biology at Lund University in Sweden, but then moved to the University of Oslo, Norway, where she enrolled in a specialist course in marine biology with Trygve Braarud, a university professor at University of Oslo, with an emphasis on phytoplankton. Þórunn's research project and final thesis dealt with studies of phytoplankton growth in the sea off northern Iceland. In 1950 and 1953, Þórunn went on expeditions with the Icelandic coast guard ship Mária Júlía and collected samples for her final project. Þórunn received a Master’s in Science degree in marine biology with a specialization in phytoplankton from the University of Oslo in 1956. This was the first time an Icelandic woman received a university degree specializing in marine research.

== Career ==
In 1956, Þórunn joined the Marine and Freshwater Research Institute (MFRI), known at the time as the Faculty of Business Administration, Department of Fisheries, at the University of Iceland. Þórunn spent most of her career as the department head at the MFRI. She both instigated and directed Icelandic phycological research over the course of 40 years.

Research in the seas around Iceland was often primitive in her early years of work when only the coast guard ship, Mária Júlía, was available, which, in addition to being a patrol ship, was equipped for research. Research could only be conducted when the ship was not otherwise in use by the coast guard, nonetheless Þórunn collected data onboard over many years. She published results on the annual productivity of phytoplankton in multiple scientific articles along with information on the progress of spring blooms.

Þórunn began research on algae, plankton, and primary productivity in the seas around Iceland. Early in her career, she met the Danish scientist Steemann Nielsen, who encouraged her to try the radiocarbon method in studying the primary productivity of planktonic algae. Þórunn adopted this approach and adapted it to be employed under local Icelandic conditions. Þórunn's research became the seminal study of primary productivity in the ocean around Iceland. She presented her findings underlining the high fertility of Icelandic waters in both lectures and publications, which were well received.

One of Þórunn's main research projects was to monitor the spring bloom of planktonic algae around Iceland, examine variation from year to year, and look for possible underlying causes. In addition to research on fertility and spring bloom of planktonic algae, she participated in research related to spawning and survival of commercial stocks.

When shellfish began to be farmed off Iceland and sold for consumption, Þórunn attended a course in Naples, Italy, to better identify species of planktonic algae, including those classified as toxic algae. She took an active part in shaping the monitoring of shellfish farming and fishing areas off the coast of Iceland in order to ensure consumer safety.

She acted as a mentor figure to many employees of the Marine and Freshwater Research Institute, helping them get their starts in the field.

== Family ==
Þórunn Þórðardóttir was born in Einarsstaðir, Grímsstaðaholt, Reykjavík, on May 15, 1925. She was the daughter of Katrín Pálsdóttir, a housewife and city councilmember in Reykjavík (1889–1952), and Þórður Þórðarson, a farmer and later manager of the guest house Tryggvaskáli in Selfoss (1882–1925). Þórunn was the youngest of 12 siblings.

Þórunn's husband was Odd Didriksen, a high school/junior college instructor (1927–1995). Their children are Katrín Didriksen, a goldsmith and designer, and Einar Oddsson, a biologist and musician.

== Additional details ==
Þórunn served on multiple working committees of the International Council for the Exploration of the Sea (ICES), maintained collaborations with foreign and domestic colleagues, attended meetings and courses widely to maintain and expand her knowledge, and gave lectures to her studies. During her career, Þórunn continually published articles and reports on her research, providing a body of work that has been used within Icelandic marine research.

In 1997, Þórunn received an honorary award from the Icelandic parliament’s Republic Fund for her contribution to research in the oceans around Iceland.

The new marine research vessel of the Marine and Freshwater Research Institute was named Þórunn Þórðardóttir HF 300, honoring the memory and work of Þórunn.

== Publications ==
Þórunn published a number of scientific and review articles and published educational materials about planktonic algae:

- Calkins J, Þórunn Þórðardóttir (1980) The ecological significance of solar UV-radiation on aquatic organisms. Nature, 283, 563–566.
- Eyjólfur Friðgeirsson, Sólmundur Tr. Einarsson, Erlingur Hauksson, Jón Ólafsson, Þórunn Þórðardóttir (1979) Environmental conditions and spring spawning off south and southwest Iceland 1976-1978. ICES/ELH Symposium, 1979/DA:5.
- Eyjólfur Friðgeirsson, Sólmundur Tr. Einarsson, Erlingur Hauksson, Jón Ólafsson, Þórunn Þórðardóttir (1981) Environmental conditions and spring spawning off south and southwest Iceland 1976-1978. Rapports et Procès-Verbaux, 178, 244–245.
- Guðrún G. Þórarinsdóttir, Þórunn Þórðardóttir (1997) Vágestir í plöntusvifinu. Náttúrufræðingurinn 67, 67–76.
- Jónas Bjarnason, Ólafur Karvel Pálsson, Unnsteinn Stefánsson, Þórunn Þórðardóttir (1977). Lesarkir Landverndar (2. bindi). Vistfræði hafsins. Reykjavík: Landvernd.
- Kristinn Guðmundsson, Þórunn Þórðardóttir, Garðar Jóhannesson (1996) Estimation of assimilation numbers in Icelandic waters. ICES C.M. 1996/L:30, 25 s.
- Kristinn Guðmundsson, Þórunn Þórðardóttir, Gunnar Pétursson (2004) Computation of daily primary production in Icelandic waters; a comparison of two different approaches. Hafrannsóknastofnunin. Fjölrit 106, 24 s.
- Svend-Aage Malmberg, Þórunn Þórðardóttir, Hjálmar Vilhjálmsson (1966) Report on the joint meeting on the Atlanto-Scandian herring distribution, held at Akureyri, June 12–14, 1966. ICES C.M. 1966/H:18.
- Svend-Aage Malmberg, Þórunn Þórðardóttir, Jakob Jakobsson (1972) Environmental variations and herring migration in North Icelandic waters in recent years. Iceland. A human environment sensitive to climatic changes. A contribution to the U.N. Conference on the Human Environment. Stockholm, June 9–12.
- Unnsteinn Stefánsson, Þórunn Þórðardóttir (1965) Nutrient-productivity relations in Icelandic waters in June 1964. ICES C. M. 1965/170.
- Unnsteinn Stefánsson, Þórunn Þórðardóttir, Jón Ólafsson (1987) Comparison of seasonal oxygen cycles and primary production in the Faxaflói region Southwest Iceland. Deep-Sea Research, 34: 725–739.
- Þórunn Þórðardóttir (1956) Undersökelser av fytoplankton-forholdene i fire snitt ut fra Islands nordkyst, 31/7 – 9/8 1950. Mag. sci. thesis Oslo Universitet.
- Þórunn Þórðardóttir (1957) Um plöntusvifið í sjónum. Náttúrufræðingurinn, 27, 1–14.
- Þórunn Þórðardóttir (1960) Measurements of primary production in Icelandic waters. Ann. Biol. 15, 50–52.
- Þórunn Þórðardóttir (1963) Primary productivity in Icelandic waters in May–June 1959. ICES C. M. no 131, 15pp.
- Þórunn Þórðardóttir (1963). Þörungasvifið í sjónum. Í: Úr ríki Ránar. Rv. Ferskfiskeftirlitið, s. 1–7.
- Þórunn Þórðardóttir (1969) Vorrannsóknir á þörungasvifi norðan lands og vestan. Hafrannsóknir 1, 20–50.
- Þórunn Þórðardóttir (1970) Rannsóknir á þörungasvifi fyrir norðan og norðaustan Ísland 1969. Hafrannsóknir 2, 37–44.
- Þórunn Þórðardóttir (1973) Successive measurements of primary production and composition of phytoplankton at two stations west of Iceland. Norw. Jour. Bot. 20, 257–270.
- Þórunn Þórðardóttir (1976) Preliminary assessment of the annual production in the shelf areas around Iceland. ICES C. M. 1976/l:32, 4 pp.
- Þórunn Þórðardóttir (1976) The spring primary production in Icelandic waters 1970–1975. ICES C. M. 1976/l:31 21 pp.
- Þórunn Þórðardóttir (1977) Framleiðni þörungasvifsins í sjónum við Ísland. Fæðubúskapurinn. In Vilhjálmur Lúðvíksson (ed.), Rit Landverndar 5, 33–42.
- Þórunn Þórðardóttir (1977) Primary production in north Icelandic waters in relation to recent climatic changes. In M. J. Dunbar ed. Polar oceans, proc. SCOR/SCAR conf. 655–665.
- Þórunn Þórðardóttir (1980) Breytingar á frumframleiðni í hafinu norðan íslands 1970 – 1979. Sjávarfréttir 8, 18–25.
- Þórunn Þórðardóttir (1980) Phytoplankton investigations during spring in Icelandic waters. Nordic Council for Ecology. Newsletter 12, 12–13.
- Þórunn Þórðardóttir (1984) Primary production north of Iceland in relation to water masses in May–June 1970 – 1980. ICES C.M. 1984/L:20.
- Þórunn Þórðardóttir (1986) Timing and duration of spring blooming south and southwest of Iceland. In S. Skreslet ed. The role of Freshwater Outflow in Coastal Marine Ecosystems. NATO, ASI Series 7, 345–360.
- Þórunn Þórðardóttir (1994). Plöntusvif og framleiðni í sjónum við Ísland. Í: Unnsteinn Stefánsson (ritstj.) Íslendingar, hafið og auðlindir þess. Vísindafélag Íslendinga. Ráðstefnurit, 4, 65–88.
- Þórunn Þórðardóttir, Agnes Eydal (1994) Phytoplankton at the ocean quahog harvesting areas Off the southwest coast of Iceland 1994. Svifþörungar á kúfiskmiðum út af norðvesturströnd Íslands 1994. Hafrannsóknastofnun. Fjölrit 51, 28 s.
- Þórunn Þórðardóttir, Kristinn Guðmundsson (1998) Plöntusvif. Lífríki sjávar. Námsgagnastofnun, Hafrannsóknastofnunin 12 s.
- Þórunn Þórðardóttir, Kristinn Guðmundsson, Gunnar Pétursson (1991) Computations for estimating daily primary production from incubator measurements of ^{14}C uptake at light saturation. ICES C.M. 1991/L:64.
- Þórunn Þórðardóttir, Ólafur S Ástþórsson (1986) Chlorophyll a and zooplankton distribution in Icelandic waters in spring 1982, 1983 and 1984. Ann. Biol. 41, 63–66.
- Þórunn Þórðardóttir, Unnsteinn Stefánsson (1977) Productivity in relation to environmental variables in the Faxaflói region 1966–1967. ICES C. M. 1977/l 34, 1–25.
