= Ben Treffers =

Australian swimmer

Personal information
- Full name: Benjamin Treffers
- Nickname: "Ben"
- National team: Australia
- Born: 15 August 1991 (age 35) Canberra, Australian Capital Territory
- Height: 1.73 m (5 ft 8 in)
- Weight: 74 kg (163 lb)
- Relatives: Mark Treffers (father); Lynne Dalzell (aunt)

Sport
- Sport: Swimming
- Strokes: Backstroke
- Club: Burley Griffin
- Coach: John Fowlie
Medal record
Men's swimming
Representing Australia
World Championships (LC)
Bronze medal – third place	2015 Kazan	50 m backstroke
Commonwealth Games
Gold medal – first place	2014 Glasgow	50 m backstroke
Silver medal – second place	2018 Gold Coast	50 m backstroke
Universiade
Gold medal – first place	2013 Kazan	50 m backstroke
Silver medal – second place	2013 Kazan	100 m backstroke

Benjamin Treffers (born 15 August 1991) is an Australian competitive swimmer who has participated in the FINA World Championships and Commonwealth Games. Treffers is a former Australian Record Holder and Commonwealth Champion in the 50m backstroke event. Treffers also won the title of 2012 Australian Champion in the 50m backstroke event and was trained by the Australian Institute of Sport. Coached by John Fowlie, Treffers won the title of 2011 Australian Champion in the Men's 100m Backstroke event and represented Australia at the 2011 World Championships in Shanghai, having narrowly missed out on a place at the 2010 Commonwealth Games. In 2018, Ben was appointed a brand ambassador for men's active lifestyle wear SQD Athletica. He has blogged about his preparations for the 2018 Commonwealth Games on the Gold Coast.

Treffers is the son of Mark Treffers, who won a gold medal swimming for New Zealand at the 1974 British Commonwealth Games, and the nephew of Lynne Dalzell and Paul Rowe, who swam internationally for New Zealand and Australia, respectively.

== See also ==
- List of Commonwealth Games medallists in swimming (men)
