= Ágnes Kaczander =

Hungarian swimmer

Personal information
- Full name: Kaczander-Kiss Ágnes
- Nationality: Hungarian
- Born: 21 November 1953 (age 72) Budapest
- Height: 1.67 m (5 ft 6 in)
- Weight: 58 kg (128 lb)

Sport
- Sport: Swimming
- Strokes: breaststroke
- Club: Budapesti Spartacus SC
Medal record
European Championships (LC)
Bronze medal – third place	1974 Vienna	100 m breaststroke

Ágnes Kaczander (also known as Kaczander-Kiss) (born 21 November 1953 in Budapest) is a former breaststroke swimmer from Hungary, who competed at the Summer Olympics for her native country in 1972. There she came fourth in 100 m breaststroke and sixth in 200 m breaststroke.

At the European Championships she won a bronze medal in 1974 in 100 m breaststroke.
