= Mitchell Emery =

Australian water polo player

Personal information
- Born: 27 September 1990 (age 35) Baulkham Hills, New South Wales Australia
- Height: 188 cm (6 ft 2 in)
- Weight: 96 kg (212 lb)

Sport
- Sport: water polo
- Updated on 19 August 2015

Mitchell Emery (born 27 September 1990) is a water polo player of Australia. He was part of the Australian team at the 2015 World Aquatics Championships, as well as being part of the team which went to the 2016 Olympics in Rio de Janeiro.
