= Ulrike Klees =

German swimmer

Personal information
- Born: 3 May 1955 (age 71) Gelsenkirchen, West Germany
- Height: 1.71 m (5 ft 7 in)
- Weight: 60 kg (130 lb)

Sport
- Sport: Swimming
- Club: Wasserfreunde Wuppertal

Ulrike Klees (born 3 May 1955) is a retired German swimmer. She competed in the 200 m breaststroke event at the 1972 Summer Olympics, but failed to reach the final.

She has a degree in psychology, and after retiring from swimming worked as a sport psychologist with the national swimming team and top athletes from other disciplines. Since 1990 she works with musicians and is a lecturer at the Bavarian State Opera.
