= Renate Vogel =

East German swimmer

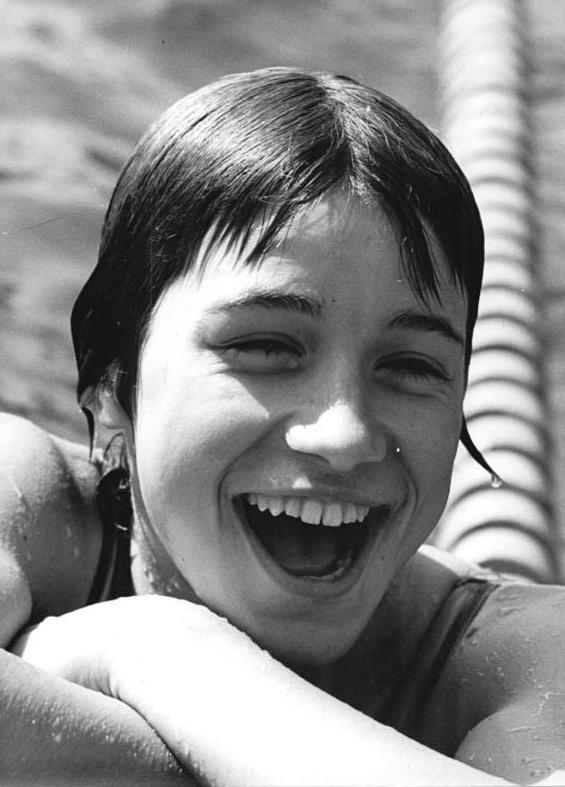
- Renate Vogel in 1971

Personal information
- Born: 30 June 1955 (age 71) Karl-Marx-Stadt, East Germany
- Height: 1.64 m (5 ft 5 in)
- Weight: 54 kg (119 lb)

Sport
- Sport: Swimming
- Club: SC Karl-Marx-Stadt
Medal record
Representing East Germany
Olympic Games
Silver medal – second place	1972 Munich	4×100 m medley
World Championships
Gold medal – first place	1973 Belgrade	100 m breaststroke
Gold medal – first place	1973 Belgrade	200 m breaststroke
Gold medal – first place	1973 Belgrade	4×100 m medley
European Championships
Gold medal – first place	1974 Vienna	4×100 m medley
Silver medal – second place	1974 Vienna	100 m breaststroke

Renate Vogel (later Heinrich and Bauer, born 30 June 1955) is a retired East German breaststroke swimmer. She had her best achievements in the 4 × 100 m medley relay, setting two world records in 1973 and 1974, and winning a silver medal at the 1972 Summer Olympics and two gold medals at the 1973 World Aquatics Championships and 1974 European Aquatics Championships. She also won two world titles in the 100 m and 200 breaststroke events in 1973, and set two world records in the 100 m breaststroke in 1974.

In 1979, she fled to West Germany by boarding a plane from Budapest to Munich with a false West German passport. There she gave a series of interviews disclosing details of the East German training system and later worked as a swimming coach.

Her cousin, the late Helga Lindner also competed in swimming at the 1972 Olympics.
