= Cristina Sheehan =

Australian synchronized swimmer

Personal information
- Born: 26 September 1998 (age 27) Brisbane, Australia

Sport
- Sport: Swimming
- Strokes: Synchronised swimming

Cristina Sheehan (born 26 September 1998) is an Australian synchronised swimmer. She competed in the team event at the 2016 Summer Olympics.
