= Chantal Grimard =

Belgian swimmer

Personal information
- Born: 9 September 1959 (age 66) Ougrée, Belgium

Sport
- Sport: Swimming

Chantal Grimard (born 9 September 1959) is a Belgian former butterfly and freestyle swimmer. She competed in four events at the 1976 Summer Olympics.
