= Nieves Panadell =

Spanish swimmer (born 1956)

Personal information
- Full name: María Nieves Panadell Bringués
- Born: 3 July 1956 (age 70) Manresa, Catalonia, Spain

Sport
- Sport: Swimming

María Nieves Panadell Bringués (Note: In this Spanish name, the first or paternal surname is Panadell and the second or maternal family name is Bringués.) (born 3 July 1956) is a Spanish former swimmer. She competed in the women's 200 metre breaststroke at the 1972 Summer Olympics.
