= Tetiana Prudnikova =

Russian swimmer (born 1954)

Personal information
- Nationality: Russian
- Born: 29 March 1954 (age 72)

Sport
- Sport: Swimming

Tetiana Prudnikova (born 29 March 1954) is a Russian former swimmer. She competed in two events at the 1972 Summer Olympics for the Soviet Union.
