= Sylvia Langer =

German swimmer

Personal information
- Born: 20 August 1954 (age 71) Brandenburg, Germany

Sport
- Sport: Swimming

Sylvia Langer (born 20 August 1954) is a German former swimmer. She competed in two events at the 1972 Summer Olympics.
