= Tamara Shelofastova =

Russian swimmer

Personal information
- Born: 13 June 1959 (age 67) Leningrad, Russian SFSR, Soviet Union
- Height: 1.75 m (5 ft 9 in)
- Weight: 61 kg (134 lb)

Sport
- Sport: Swimming
- Club: SKA Leningrad

Tamara Anatolyevna Shelofastova (Russian: Тамара Анатольевна Шелофастова; born 13 June 1959) is a Russian swimmer. She competed at the 1976 Summer Olympics in the individual 100 m and 200 m butterfly events and 4 × 100 m medley relay and finished in eighth, seventh and fourth place, respectively. Between 1973 and 1977 she won eight national titles and set 14 national records in butterfly, crawl and medley disciplines. Since 1990 she competes in the masters category and holds about 20 national titles and 20 national records set between 1991 and 2008.
