= Lynne Rowe =

New Zealand swimmer (born 1958)

Personal information
- Born: 2 July 1958 (age 67) Christchurch, New Zealand
- Relative: Ben Treffers (nephew)

Sport
- Country: New Zealand
- Sport: Swimming

Lynne Rowe (born 2 July 1958) is a New Zealand swimmer. She competed in three events at the 1976 Summer Olympics.
