= Béatrice Mottoulle =

Belgian swimmer

Personal information
- Born: 2 July 1956 (age 70) Ougrée, Belgium

Sport
- Sport: Swimming

Béatrice Mottoulle (born 2 July 1956) is a Belgian former breaststroke swimmer. She competed in three events at the 1972 Summer Olympics.
