= Beverley Whitfield =

Australian swimmer

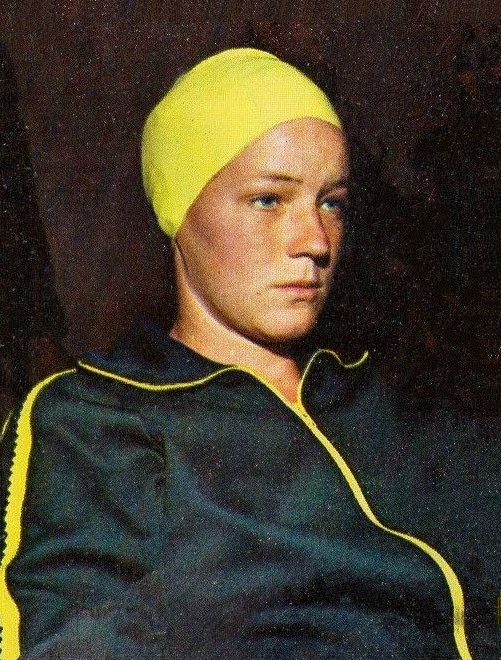

Personal information
- Full name: Beverley Joy Whitfield
- National team: Australia
- Born: 15 June 1954 Wollongong, New South Wales
- Died: 20 August 1996 (aged 42) Thirroul, New South Wales
- Height: 1.63 m (5 ft 4 in)
- Weight: 57 kg (126 lb)

Sport
- Sport: Swimming
- Strokes: Breaststroke
- Coach: Terry Gathercole and Don Talbot
Medal record
Women's swimming
Representing Australia
Olympic Games
Gold medal – first place	1972 Munich	200 m breaststroke
Bronze medal – third place	1972 Munich	100 m breaststroke
British Commonwealth Games
Gold medal – first place	1970 Edinburgh	100 m breaststroke
Gold medal – first place	1970 Edinburgh	200 m breaststroke
Gold medal – first place	1970 Edinburgh	4×100 m medley
Silver medal – second place	1974 Christchurch	200 m breaststroke
Silver medal – second place	1974 Christchurch	4×100 m medley

Beverley Joy Whitfield (15 June 1954 – 20 August 1996) was an Australian breaststroke swimmer of the 1970s, who won a gold medal in the 200-metre breaststroke at the 1972 Summer Olympics in Munich. She was coached by Terry Gathercole and Don Talbot.

== Biography ==
The daughter of a fitter and turner who worked in the Wollongong steelworks for more than 35 years, Whitfield was taught to swim along with her sister and their cousins at the age four by her maternal uncle, who was active in the local Learn to Swim program. Along with her sister and cousins, she was a childhood member of the Shellharbour Swimming Club, and was mainly taken to local swimming competitions by her father and uncle. This became even more pronounced following the death of her mother from cancer.

Whitfield showed a preference for the breaststroke from an early age, and would do a breaststroke kick when participating in freestyle activities. She showed a wider interest in sport while at Shellharbour Public School, playing softball, netball, athletics and even playing cricket against her male classmates. However, this ended as she approached the end of her primary school years, with swimming coming to the fore. At the age of nine, Whitfield competed in the Primary School State Championships at North Sydney Pool, coming second to Kathy Whitlam, who happened to be the daughter of future Prime Minister of Australia Gough Whitlam. It was at the age of ten that Whitfield witnessed Australia's Dawn Fraser win her third consecutive 100-metre freestyle Olympic gold medal at the 1964 Summer Olympics, becoming the first Olympian to win an individual event three times consecutively, that forged her resolve to become an Olympian.

At the age of 11, her uncle decided to send her to Sydney every weekend to receive training from Terry Gathercole, an Olympic medal-winning breaststroker who was regarded as Australia's foremost breaststroke coach. This involved long daytrips for her family to help her fulfill her dream, usually starting before daybreak. During school holidays, she boarded with Gathercole to train under him on a daily basis. In her first year under Gathercole, she finished third in the 100-metre breaststroke in her age group at the New South Wales Championships. Her improvement was rapid, and in 1968, she won the 100-metre and 200-metre breaststroke in the under-14 division at the State championships before placing second in her age group at the national titles in Hobart. This her progress to the open Australian Championships, which were the selection trials for the Olympics team. At the age of 14, she narrowly missed selection for the 1968 Summer Olympics in Mexico City, after finishing sixth and fourth in the 100-metre and 200-metre breaststroke respectively in the trials.

In 1969, Gathercole was appointed as a swimming coach in Midland, Texas, forcing Whitfield's father to raise funds for her to travel to Texas and board with his family to continue her training for six months, where she sharpened her racing skills with more frequent racing in the more competitive American scene. Her improvement saw her place sixth and third in the 100-metre and 200-metrebreaststroke respectively at the US Championships in Louisville, Kentucky. On her return to Australia in November 1969, Gathercole arranged for her to train under Don Talbot. Whitfield found Talbot to be a hard-pushing coach: "I both hated and loved him. Terry Gathercole and Don Talbot had two different approaches. With Don I had to do all the strokes, the same number of repetitions and the same as everyone else was doing. I was exhausted."

Whitfield proceeded to win both breaststroke titles at the 1970 Australian Championships in times of 1 m 18.5 s and 2 m 48 s respectively. She then toured South Africa with the national team before repeating the victories at the 1970 Commonwealth Games in Edinburgh in times of 1 m 17.4 s and 2 m 44.2 s respectively. She relegated England's Dorothy Harrison to silver in setting new Commonwealth records in both races. She added a third gold medal in the 4×100-metre medley relay, combining with Lynne Watson, Alyson Mabb and Denise Langford in 4 m 30.66 s. Whitfield continued her winning run in 1971, taking out the Australian Championships in both breaststroke events, although her times were slower than in Edinburgh. A third victory came with the New South Wales team in the medley relay.

She competed at the International Coca-Cola Meet at Crystal Palace in London, taking the bronze medal in the 200-metre breaststroke behind the Soviet Galina Prozumenshchikova, the world record holder. Late in 1971, Whitfields' rival Harrison came to Australia on a Churchill Fellowship and trained alongside her with Talbot. At the 1972 Australian Championships, Harrison took both the 100-metre and 200-metre breaststroke titles from Whitfield. Whitfield gradually improved her times in the lead up to the 1972 Summer Olympics during the Australian training camp in Scarborough, Queensland.

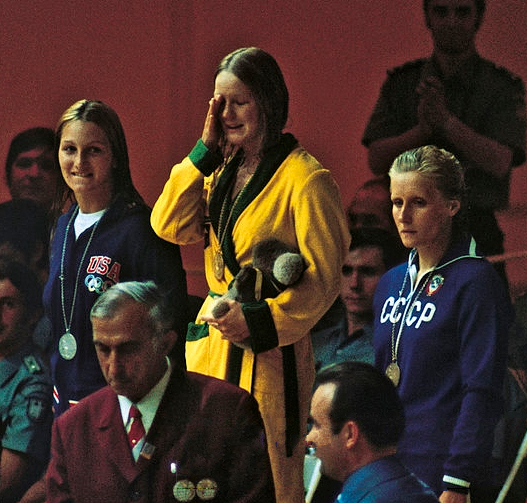
Dana Schoenfield, Beverley Whitfield, and Galina Prozumenshchikova at the 1972 Olympics

Coming into the Olympics, she was not regarded as a favourite, with her best times being substantially slower than other swimmers. Whitfield's best time in the 100-metre breaststroke was only 1 m 18 s, but she repeatedly lowered this throughout the competition, coming third in her heat in a time of 1 m 17.59 s to scrape into the semi-final. She then posted a time of 1 m 16.3 s, again placing third and again scraping into the final. She again substantially improved her time in the final, claiming bronze in a time of 1 m 15.73 s behind Cathy Carr of the United States.

In the 200-metre breaststroke, she came second in her heat to Prozumenshchikova in a time of 2 m 44.5 s, making her the sixth fastest qualifier for the final, placing her in lane seven. Talbot told her to stay calm if Prozumenshchikova made an early attack, telling Whitfield that the third lap was the critical part of the race. The Australian public were not expecting much of Whitfield. Her final was on the same night as the women's 100-metre freestyle and the men's 200-metre freestyle, in which Shane Gould and Michael Wenden had been anticipated to win. After the first lap of the race, Whitfield seemed unlikely to deliver an upset victory, turning through the 50-metre mark in last place. She clawed back a little ground in the next lap but was still far behind at the midpoint of the race. She made her move in the third lap as instructed by Talbot, and began to reel in her opponents, causing a crowd reaction. She was fourth at the 150-metre mark, before moving into third place after the turn at Prozumenshchikova's expense before claiming the lead with 20 metres to go by passing Hungary's Ágnes Kaczander and American Dana Schoenfield. Her time of 2m 41.71s was 2.5 s faster than her previous best, holding off a final ditch attack from Schoenfield. The 4×100-metre medley relay was an anti-climax as the Australians swam poorly and came fifth in their heat and failed to qualify for the final. On her arrival in her home town, she was accorded a street parade.

This was Whitfield's career peak. She won both breaststroke titles the following year at the Australian Championships in times slower than she had recorded in Munich, but failed to win a medal at the 1973 World Aquatics Championships in Belgrade. Again in 1974, she won both events at the national championships in even slower times, but managed only a bronze in the 200-metre event in a time of 2 m 43.58 s and a silver in the medley relay. In 1975, she lost both of her national titles, and subsequently retired, admitting that she had lost her drive to compete.

She later worked for a period as a youth worker for the New South Wales Department of Youth and Community Services in Shellharbour and Wollongong.

In 1994 the Beverley Whitfield Pool in Shellharbour was named in her honour. Whitfield was inducted into the International Swimming Hall of Fame in 1995. She died suddenly in 1996 at the age of 42.

Whitfield's strength was her kick, with ergometer tests showing her leg power to be comparable to that of weightlifters.

== See also ==
- List of members of the International Swimming Hall of Fame
- List of Olympic medalists in swimming (women)
