= Petra Nows =

German swimmer

Personal information
- Born: 23 June 1953 (age 73) Duisburg, West Germany

Sport
- Sport: Swimming
- Strokes: Breaststroke
Medal record
Women's swimming
Representing West Germany
World Championships
Bronze medal – third place	1973 Belgrade	4×100 m medley

Petra Nows (born 23 June 1953) is a German former swimmer. She competed in the women's 200 metre breaststroke at the 1972 Summer Olympics.
