= Brigitte Schuchardt =

East German swimmer

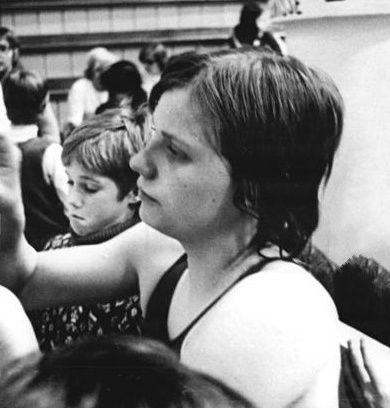
- Brigitte Schuchardt in 1973

Medal record

Women's swimming

Representing East Germany

World Championships
Bronze medal – third place	1973 Belgrade	100 m breastroke

European Championships
Gold medal – first place	1970 Barcelona	4×100 m medley
Silver medal – second place	1970 Barcelona	400 m medley

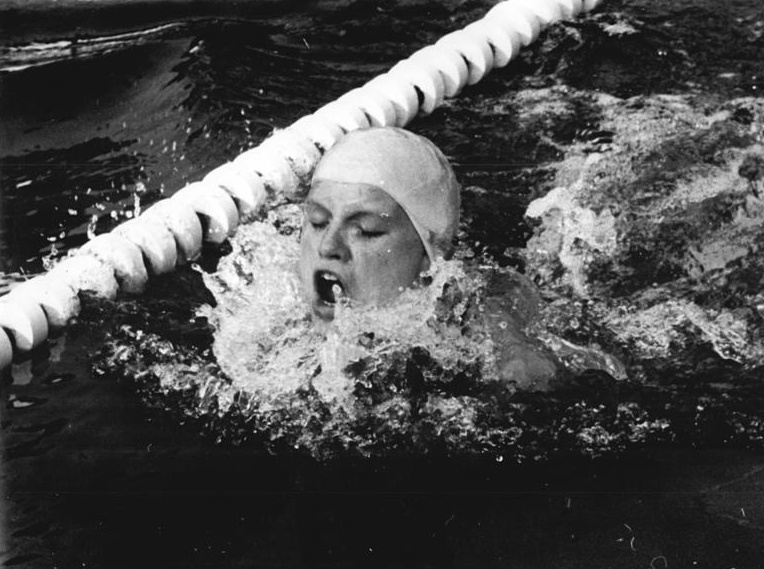
Schuchardt in 1970

Brigitte Schuchardt (born 28 March 1955, in Jena) is a retired German swimmer who won a bronze medal in the 100 m breaststroke at the 1973 World Aquatics Championships, as well as gold and silver medals in medley events at the 1970 European Aquatics Championships. She also participated in the 1972 Summer Olympics in three individual events but did not reach the finals.
