= Britt-Marie Smedh =

Swedish swimmer

Personal information
- Born: March 22, 1955 (age 71) Solna Municipality, Stockholm County, Sweden

Sport
- Sport: Swimming
- Strokes: Breaststroke
- Club: Stockholmspolisens IF

Britt-Marie Smedh (born 22 March 1955) is a former Swedish breaststroke swimmer who represented Stockholmspolisens IF. Smedh participated in the 1972 Summer Olympics, finishing 7th in the 100 m breaststroke, 10th in the 200 m breaststroke and 8th in the 4 × 100 m medley relay.

Smedh is the mother to Swedish Olympic medalist Therese Alshammar.

== Clubs ==
- Stockholmspolisens IF
