= Lyudmila Porubayko =

Soviet swimmer

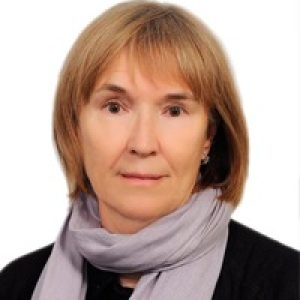

Personal information
- Born: 24 April 1950 (age 76) Krasnodar, Russia
- Height: 1.68 m (5 ft 6 in)
- Weight: 59 kg (130 lb)

Sport
- Sport: Swimming
- Club: Spartak
Medal record
Representing Soviet Union
Summer Universiade
Silver medal – second place	1973 Moscow	200 m breaststroke

Lyudmila Nikolayevna Porubayko (Russian: Людмила Николаевна Порубайко; born 24 April 1950) is a Soviet swimmer. She competed at the 1972 Summer Olympics in the 100 m and 200 m breaststroke and finished seventh in the latter event. She secured two national titles between 1969 and 1973 and earned a bronze medal in the 200m breaststroke at the European Masters Championships in 2011.

She graduated from the Kuban State Medical University in 1974, where she defended her PhD in 1985, and since 1991 is chairing the sports department.
