= Kuniko Banno =

Japanese swimmer

Personal information
- Born: 16 June 1957 (age 69)

Sport
- Sport: Swimming
- Strokes: butterfly

Kuniko Banno (坂野 邦子, Banno Kuniko; born 16 June 1957) is a Japanese former butterfly swimmer. She competed in two events at the 1976 Summer Olympics.
