= Zuzana Marková (swimmer) =

Czech swimmer

Personal information
- Born: 8 October 1952 (age 73) Prague, Czechoslovakia

Sport
- Sport: Swimming

Zuzana Marková (born 8 October 1952) is a Czech former swimmer. She competed in two events at the 1972 Summer Olympics.
