= Éva Kiss (swimmer) =

Hungarian swimmer

Personal information
- Born: 20 March 1954 (age 72) Gödöllő, Hungary

Sport
- Sport: Swimming

Éva Kiss (born 20 March 1954) is a Hungarian former swimmer. She competed in three events at the 1972 Summer Olympics.
