= Þórunn Alfreðsdóttir =

Icelandic swimmer (born 1960)

Personal information
- Born: 21 December 1960 (age 65)

Sport
- Sport: Swimming

Þórunn Alfreðsdóttir (born 21 December 1960) is an Icelandic former butterfly swimmer. She competed in two events at the 1976 Summer Olympics.
