= Judith Hudson =

Australian swimmer

Personal information
- Born: 20 April 1958 (age 68)

Sport
- Sport: Swimming
- Strokes: Breaststroke, butterfly, individual medley

Judith Hudson (born 20 April 1958) is an Australian former swimmer. She competed at the 1972 Summer Olympics and the 1976 Summer Olympics.
