= 1968 UCI Road World Championships =

Sports competition

- Venue: Imola, Italy (professionals); Montevideo, Uruguay (amateurs)
- Dates: 31 August-1 September 1968 (professionals); 7-10 November 1968 (amateurs)
- Coordinates: 44°21′11″N 11°42′53″E

The 1968 UCI Road World Championships took place from 31 August-1 September 1968 in Imola, Italy (for professionals), on a 75 km circuit starting and arriving at the "Enzo and Dino Ferrari" auto racing circuit. The amateur races were held from 7-10 November in Montevideo, Uruguay.

== Results ==
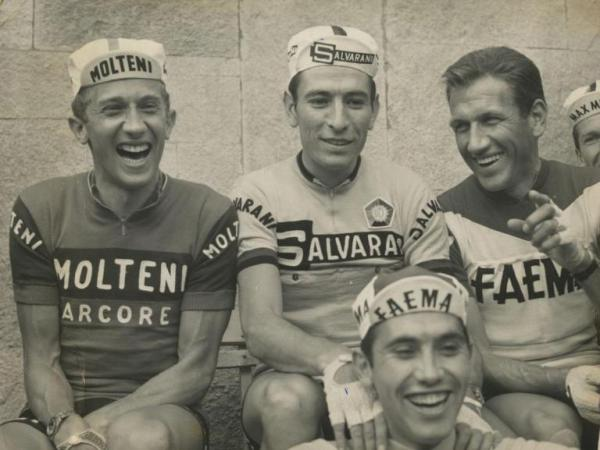
Gianni Motta, Felice Gimondi, Vittorio Adorni and Eddy Merckx in Imola, 1968

| Race: | Gold: | Time | Silver: | Time | Bronze : | Time |
|---|---|---|---|---|---|---|
Men
| Men's road race | Vittorio Adorni; Italy | 7 h 27 min 39s | Herman Van Springel; Belgium | + 9 min 50s | Michele Dancelli; Italy | + 10 min 18s |
| Amateurs' road race | Vittorio Marcelli; Italy | - | Luiz Carlos Flores; Brazil | - | Erik Pettersson; Sweden | - |
| Team time trial | Sweden; Erik Pettersson; Gösta Pettersson; Sture Pettersson; Tomas Pettersson | - | Switzerland; Bruno Hubschmid; Robert Thalmann; Walter Burki; Erich Spahn | - | Italy; Vittorio Marcelli; Flavio Martini; Giovanni Bramucci; Benito Pigato | - |
Women
| Women's road race | Keetie van Oosten-Hage; Netherlands | - | Baiba Caune; Soviet Union | - | Morena Tartagni; Italy | - |

== Medal table ==
| Rank | Nation | Gold | Silver | Bronze | Total |
|---|---|---|---|---|---|
| 1 | Italy (ITA) | 2 | 0 | 3 | 5 |
| 2 | Sweden (SWE) | 1 | 0 | 1 | 2 |
| 3 | Netherlands (NED) | 1 | 0 | 0 | 1 |
| 4 | Belgium (BEL) | 0 | 1 | 0 | 1 |
| 4 | Brazil (BRA) | 0 | 1 | 0 | 1 |
| 4 | Soviet Union (URS) | 0 | 1 | 0 | 1 |
| 4 | Switzerland (SUI) | 0 | 1 | 0 | 1 |
| Totals (7 entries) | | 4 | 4 | 4 | 12 |
