= Tomas Pettersson =

Swedish cyclist

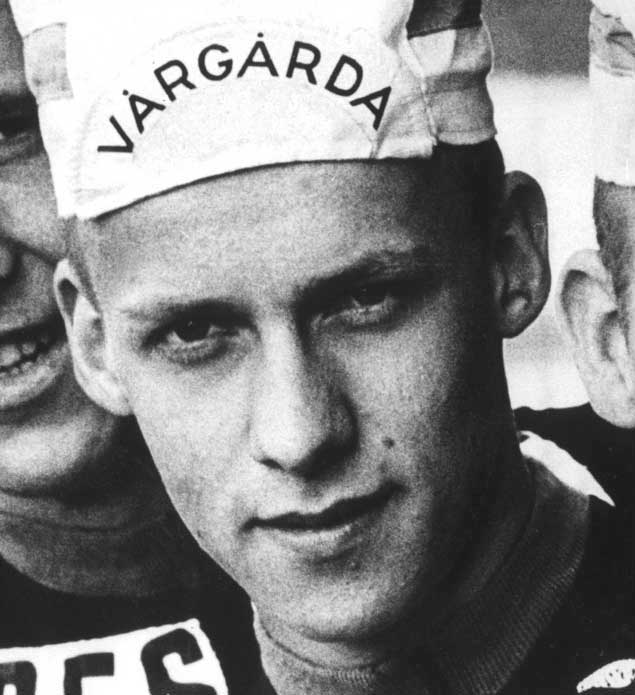

Personal information
- Born: 15 May 1947 (age 79) Vårgårda, Sweden
- Height: 186 cm (6 ft 1 in)
- Weight: 69 kg (152 lb)

Cycling career
- Sport: Cycling
- Discipline: Road

Amateur team
- 1964–1969: Vårgårda CK

Professional teams
- 1970–1972: Ferretti
- 1973: Scic
Medal record
Representing SWE
Olympic Games
Silver medal – second place	1968 Mexico City	Team time trial
World Championships
Gold medal – first place	1967 Heerlen	Team time trial
Gold medal – first place	1968 Imola	Team time trial
Gold medal – first place	1969 Zolder	Team time trial

Tomas Pettersson (born 15 May 1947) is a retired Swedish cyclist. He was part of the road racing team of four Pettersson brothers, known as Fåglum brothers, who won the world title in 1967–1969 and a silver medal at the 1968 Olympics. In 1967 they were awarded the Svenska Dagbladet Gold Medal.

Petterson turned professional after the 1969 World Championships, together with the other brothers. He rode the Tour de France in 1970 and 1971, and won the 1970 Trofeo Baracchi (together with brother Gösta). He retired prematurely in 1973, and later regretted that decision.

== Major results ==
1965
National Junior Road Championships

1st Road race
1st Time trial

1966
1st Team time trial, National Road Championships (with Gösta & Erik Pettersson)
1967
1st Team time trial, UCI Road World Championships (with Sture, Gösta & Erik Pettersson)
1st Team time trial, National Road Championships (with Sture, Gösta & Erik Pettersson)
1968
1st Team time trial, UCI Road World Championships (with Sture, Gösta & Erik Pettersson)
National Road Championships

1st Time trial
1st Team time trial (with Sture, Gösta & Erik Pettersson)

Summer Olympics

2nd Team time trial (with Sture, Gösta & Erik Pettersson)
7th Road race

1969
1st Team time trial, UCI Road World Championships (with Sture, Gösta & Erik Pettersson)
National Road Championships

1st Team time trial (with Sture, Gösta & Erik Pettersson)
2nd Time trial

1st Stage 6a Tour de l'Avenir
1970
1st Trofeo Baracchi (with Gösta Pettersson)
1st Stage 1a Cronostaffetta (with Pietro Guerra)
2nd GP Industria & Commercio di Prato
3rd Giro del Lazio
3rd GP Lugano
5th Giro dell'Emilia
1971
1st Stage 5b Tour de Romandie
2nd Coppa Placci
2nd Trofeo Baracchi (with Gösta Pettersson)
2nd Baden–Baden (with Gösta Pettersson)
3rd Giro del Lazio
4th Giro dell'Emilia
5th Trofeo Laigueglia
5th Gran Premio Città di Camaiore
1972
3rd Overall Tirreno–Adriatico

1st Stage 1

3rd Trofeo Baracchi (with Gösta Pettersson)
3rd Giro di Puglia
3rd Giro del Lazio
3rd Coppa Agostoni
4th Coppa Placci
5th Tre Valli Varesine
8th Giro di Toscana
