= 1969 UCI Road World Championships =

Cycling championship held in Belgium and Czechoslovakia

- Venue: Zolder, Belgium (professionals); Brno, Czechoslovakia (amateurs)
- Dates: 10 August 1969 (professionals); 22–24 August 1969 (amateurs)
- Coordinates: 51°03′N 05°17′E

The 1969 UCI Road World Championships took place on 10 August 1969 in Zolder, Belgium (for professionals), and from 22 to 24 August 1969 in Brno, Czechoslovakia (for amateurs).

== Results ==
| Race: | Gold: | Time | Silver: | Time | Bronze : | Time |
|---|---|---|---|---|---|---|
Men
| Men's road race | Harm Ottenbros; Netherlands | 6 h 23 min 44s | Julien Stevens; Belgium | m.t. | Michele Dancelli; Italy | + 2 min 18s |
| Amateurs' road race | Leif Mortensen; Denmark | - | Jean-Pierre Monséré; Belgium | - | Gustave Van Roosbroeck; Belgium | - |
| Team time trial | Sweden; Erik Pettersson; Gösta Pettersson; Sture Pettersson; Tomas Pettersson | - | Denmark; Mogens Frey; Jørgen Hansen; Jørn Lund; Leif Mortensen | - | Switzerland; Xavier Kurmann; Bruno Hubschmid; Josef Fuchs; Walter Burki | - |
Women
| Women's road race | Audrey McElmury; United States | - | Bernadette Swinnerton; United Kingdom | - | Nina Trofimova; Soviet Union | - |

== Medal table ==
| Rank | Nation | Gold | Silver | Bronze | Total |
|---|---|---|---|---|---|
| 1 | Denmark (DEN) | 1 | 1 | 0 | 2 |
| 2 | Netherlands (NED) | 1 | 0 | 0 | 1 |
| 2 | Sweden (SWE) | 1 | 0 | 0 | 1 |
| 2 | United States (USA) | 1 | 0 | 0 | 1 |
| 5 | Belgium (BEL) | 0 | 2 | 1 | 3 |
| 6 | Switzerland (SUI) | 0 | 1 | 1 | 2 |
| 7 | Italy (ITA) | 0 | 0 | 1 | 1 |
| 7 | Soviet Union (URS) | 0 | 0 | 1 | 1 |
| Totals (8 entries) | | 4 | 4 | 4 | 12 |
