= Caune =

Caune is a common Latvian surname. Notable people with the surname include:

- Agate Caune (born 2004), Latvian track and field athlete
- Baiba Caune (1945–2014), Latvian track and road racing cyclist

== See also ==
- Caunes, for people named de Caunes
- Arago cave, in French Caune de l'Arago
