= Vårgårda Municipality =

Vårgårda Municipality Vårgårda kommun
- Municipality
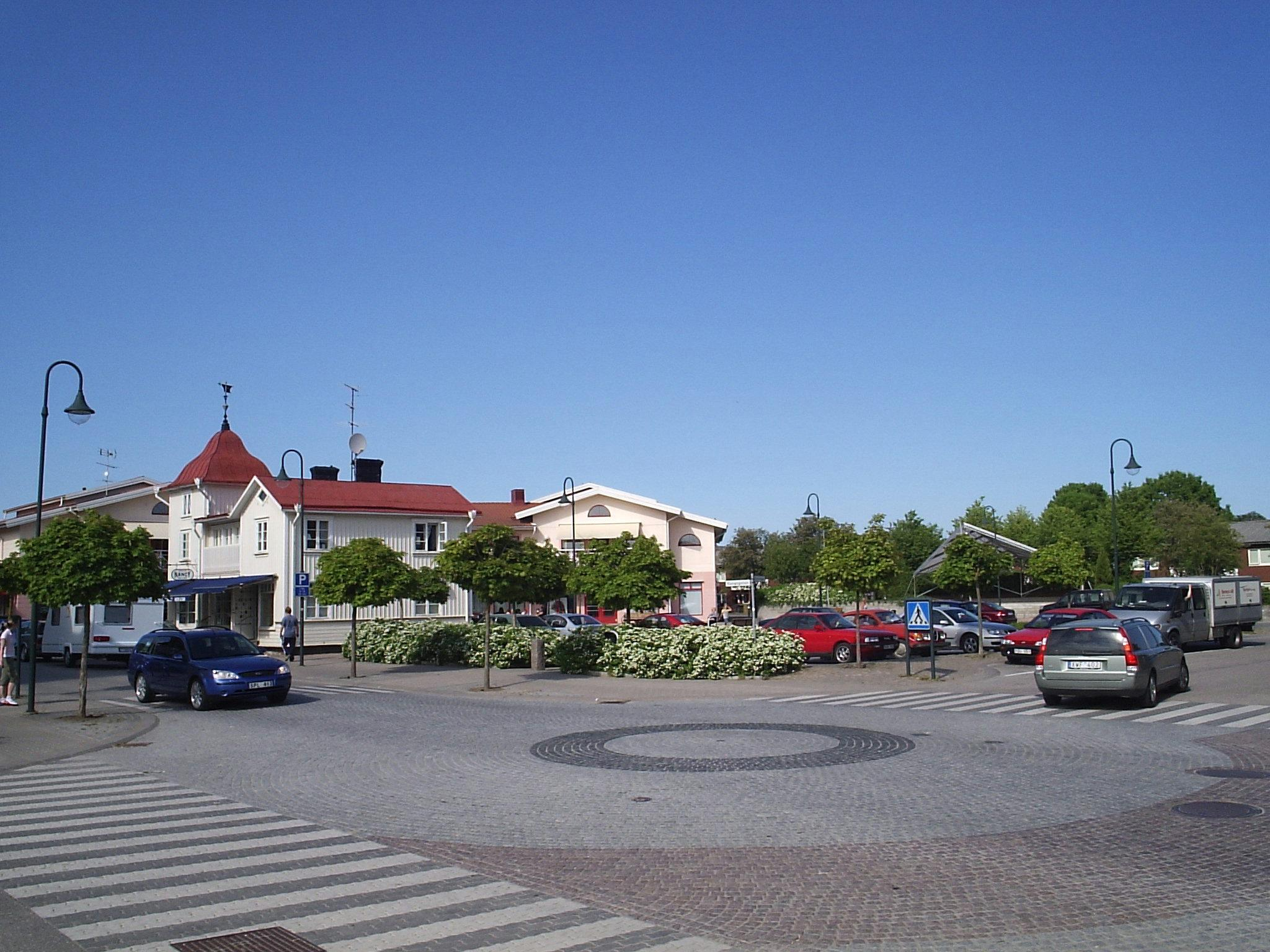

- Coat of arms

- Coordinates: 58°02′N 12°48′E
- Country: Sweden
- County: Västra Götaland County
- Seat: Vårgårda

Area
  - Total: 441.22 km^{2} (170.36 sq mi)
  - Land: 426.6 km^{2} (164.7 sq mi)
  - Water: 14.62 km^{2} (5.64 sq mi)
- Area as of 1 January 2014.

Population (30 June 2025)
  - Total: 12,485
  - Density: 29.27/km^{2} (75.80/sq mi)
- Time zone: UTC+1 (CET)
  - Summer (DST): UTC+2 (CEST)
- ISO 3166 code: SE
- Province: Västergötland
- Municipal code: 1442
- Website: www.vargarda.se

Vårgårda Municipality (Swedish: Vårgårda kommun) is a municipality in Västra Götaland County in western Sweden. Its seat is located in the town of Vårgårda. It borders Alingsås Municipality to the west, Herrljunga Municipality to the east, Essunga Municipality to the north, Bollebygd and Borås Municipalities to the south.

The local government reform of 1952 formed this municipality through the amalgamation of many small municipalities. It got its name from the only larger built-up locality in the area, Vårgårda. Its territory was not affected by the reform of 1971.

The Swedish religious revival in the 19th century was strong in Vårgårda Municipality, and the Christian climate is today dispersed in many denominations.

Several nationwide-recognized companies, such as Autoliv, are located in the municipality.

== Localities ==
The seat Vårgårda, situated between Alingsås and Herrljunga, is the largest locality in this predominantly rural area. Horla and Östadkulle are two other localities, both with fewer than 500 inhabitants in 2018.

- Galgbacken, Vårgårda

== Demographics ==
This is a demographic table based on Vårgårda Municipality's electoral districts in the 2022 Swedish general election sourced from SVT's election platform, in turn taken from SCB official statistics.

In total there were 12,163 residents, including 9,013 Swedish citizens of voting age. 44.7% voted for the left coalition and 53.9% for the right coalition.

Location	Residents	Citizen adults	Left vote	Right vote	Employed	Swedish parents	Foreign heritage	Income SEK	Degree
Location			%	%					
Algutstorp-Landa	1,494	1,089	52.8	46.3	88	81	19	27,179	32
Lena-Bergstena	1,755	1,269	36.2	62.0	87	90	10	27,810	33
Nårunga-Ornunga	1,805	1,389	40.9	57.8	88	95	5	27,196	40
Siene-Hol-Horla	1,559	1,146	37.8	61.2	88	92	8	27,686	35
Vårgårda C	1,772	1,183	50.5	47.4	71	54	46	20,756	24
Vårgårda C-Ö	1,124	841	54.1	44.5	75	67	33	21,748	22
Vårgårda N	1,381	1,051	43.7	54.9	89	90	10	28,670	35
Vårgårda V	1,273	1,045	47.9	50.7	83	87	13	24,672	36
Source: SVT
