= Sture Pettersson =

Swedish cyclist

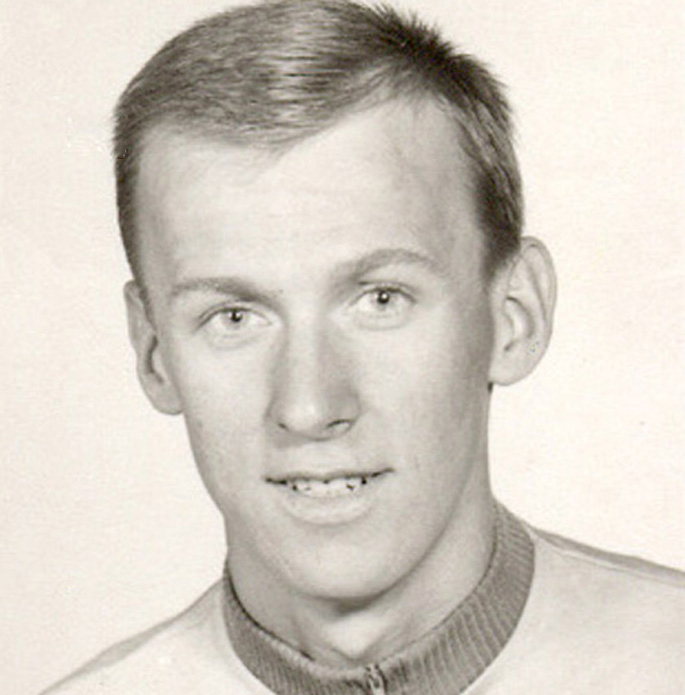

Personal information
- Born: 30 September 1942 Vårgårda, Sweden
- Died: 26 June 1983 (aged 40) Alingsås, Sweden
- Height: 188 cm (6 ft 2 in)
- Weight: 75 kg (165 lb)

Cycling career
- Sport: Cycling
- Discipline: Road

Amateur team
- 1963–1969: Vårgårda CK

Professional team
- 1970–1972: Ferretti
Medal record
Representing SWE
Olympic Games
| Silver medal – second place | 1968 Mexico City | Team time trial |
| Bronze medal – third place | 1964 Tokyo | Team time trial |
World Championships
| Gold medal – first place | 1967 Heerlen | Team time trial |
| Gold medal – first place | 1968 Imola | Team time trial |
| Gold medal – first place | 1969 Zolder | Team time trial |

Sture Helge Vilhelm Pettersson (30 September 1942 – 26 June 1983) was a Swedish cyclist. He was part of the road racing team of four Pettersson brothers, known as Fåglum brothers, who won the world title in 1967–1969 and a silver medal at the 1968 Olympics; three of the brothers were also part of the bronze-winning road team at the 1964 Games. In 1967 they were awarded the Svenska Dagbladet Gold Medal.

Petterson turned professional after the 1969 World Championships, together with the other brothers, but had little success and retired in 1972. He was known for pushing himself to the limits. At a 1964 race in Malmö he fainted 12 km before the finish; his brother Gösta rode nearby and managed to catch him from falling. Sture died aged 40, probably due to a ruptured blood vessel in the brain. His grandson Marcus Fåglum also became a leading road racing cyclist.

== Major results ==
1964
3rd Team time trial, Summer Olympics
1965
National Road Championships

1st Time trial
2nd Road race

1966
1st Team time trial, National Road Championships
1967
1st Team time trial, UCI Road World Championships (with Gösta, Tomas & Erik Pettersson)
1st Team time trial, National Road Championships
1968
1st Team time trial, UCI Road World Championships (with Gösta, Tomas & Erik Pettersson)
1st Team time trial, National Road Championships
2nd Team time trial, Summer Olympics (with Gösta, Tomas & Erik Pettersson)
1969
1st Team time trial, UCI Road World Championships (with Gösta, Tomas & Erik Pettersson)
1st Team time trial, National Road Championships
