= Erik Pettersson (cyclist) =

Swedish cyclist

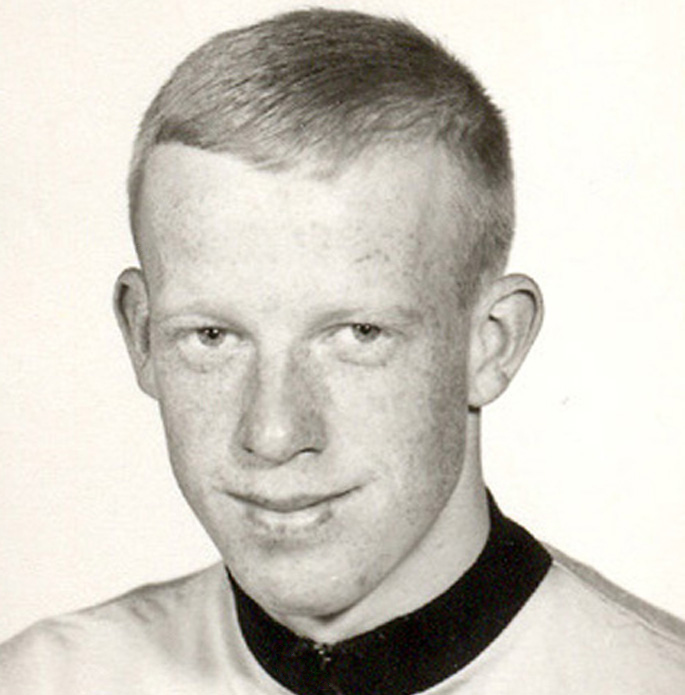

Personal information
- Born: 4 April 1944 (age 82) Vårgårda, Sweden
- Height: 180 cm (5 ft 11 in)
- Weight: 67 kg (148 lb)

Cycling career
- Sport: Cycling
- Discipline: Road
- Role: Rider

Amateur team
- 1963–1969: Vårgårda CK

Professional team
- 1970–1971: Ferretti
Medal record
Representing SWE
Olympic Games
Silver medal – second place	1968 Mexico City	Team time trial
Bronze medal – third place	1964 Tokyo	Team time trial
World Championships
Gold medal – first place	1967 Heerlen	Team time trial
Gold medal – first place	1968 Imola	Team time trial
Gold medal – first place	1969 Zolder	Team time trial

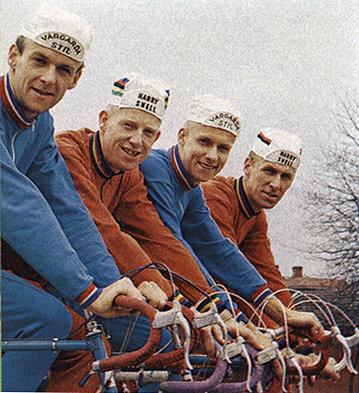
The Fåglum brothers 1967. Erik is second from the left.

Erik Håkan Pettersson (born 4 April 1944) is a retired Swedish cyclist. He was part of the road racing team of four Pettersson brothers, known as Fåglum brothers, who won the world title in 1967–1969 and a silver medal at the 1968 Olympics; three of the brothers were also part of the bronze-winning road team at the 1964 Games. In 1967 they were awarded the Svenska Dagbladet Gold Medal.

Erik was the fastest sprinter among the Fåglum brothers; he was nicknamed Rödtoppen for his red hair. He turned professional after the 1969 World Championships, together with the other brothers, but had little success and retired in 1971.

== Major results ==
1964
3rd Team time trial, Summer Olympics
1966
1st Team time trial, National Road Championships (with Sture & Gösta Pettersson)
1967
1st Team time trial, UCI Road World Championships (with Sture, Tomas & Gösta Pettersson)
National Road Championships

1st Road race
1st Team time trial (with Sture & Gösta Pettersson)

3rd Overall Tour du Maroc
1968
1st Team time trial, UCI Road World Championships (with Sture, Tomas & Gösta Pettersson)
2nd Team time trial, Summer Olympics (with Sture, Tomas & Gösta Pettersson)
1969
1st Team time trial, UCI Road World Championships (with Sture, Tomas & Gösta Pettersson)
1970
5th Coppa Placci
9th Overall Paris–Luxembourg
1971
5th Overall Tour de Romandie
5th Overall Paris–Nice
