= 1967 UCI Road World Championships =

- Venue: Heerlen, Netherlands
- Date: 3 September 1967
- Coordinates: 50°53′N 5°59′E

The 1967 UCI Road World Championships took place on 3 September 1967 in Heerlen, Netherlands.

In the same period, the 1967 UCI Track Cycling World Championships were organized in Amsterdam.

== Results ==
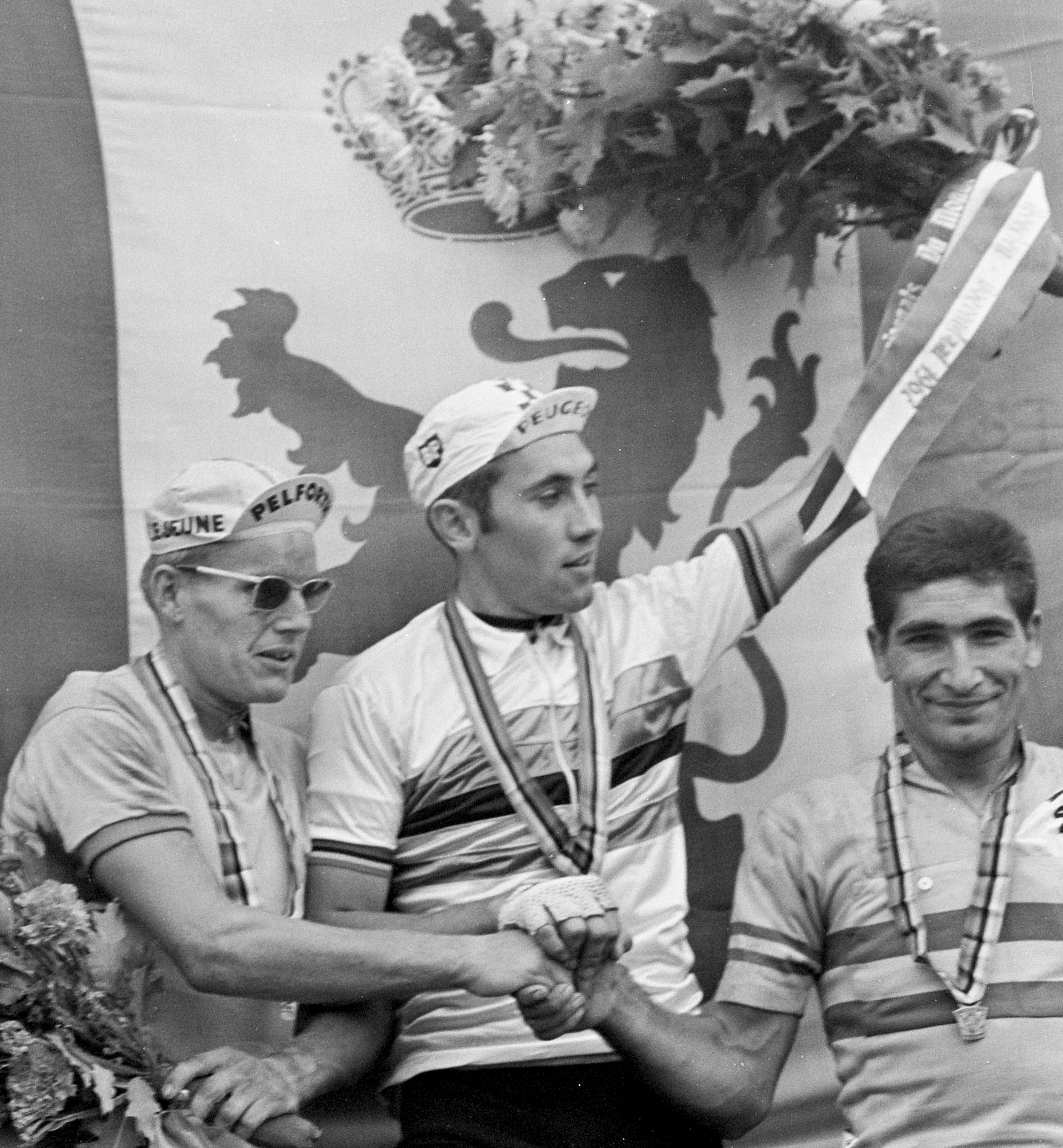
Jan Janssen, Eddy Merckx and Ramón Sáez

Race:	Gold:	Time	Silver:	Time	Bronze :	Time
Men
Men's road race	Eddy Merckx; Belgium	6 h 44 min 42s	Jan Janssen; Netherlands	m.t.	Ramón Sáez; Spain	m.t.
Amateurs' road race	Graham Webb; Great Britain	-	Claude Guyot; France	-	René Pijnen; Netherlands	-
Team time trial	Sweden; Erik Pettersson; Gösta Pettersson; Sture Pettersson; Tomas Pettersson	–	Denmark; Verner Blaudzun; Jørgen Hansen; Leif Mortensen; Henning Pedersen	–	Italy; Lorenzo Bosisio; Benito Pigato; Vittorio Marcelli; Flavio Martini	-
Women
Women's road race	Beryl Burton; Great Britain	-	Lubov Zadoroznaya; Soviet Union	-	Anna Konkina; Soviet Union	-

== Medal table ==
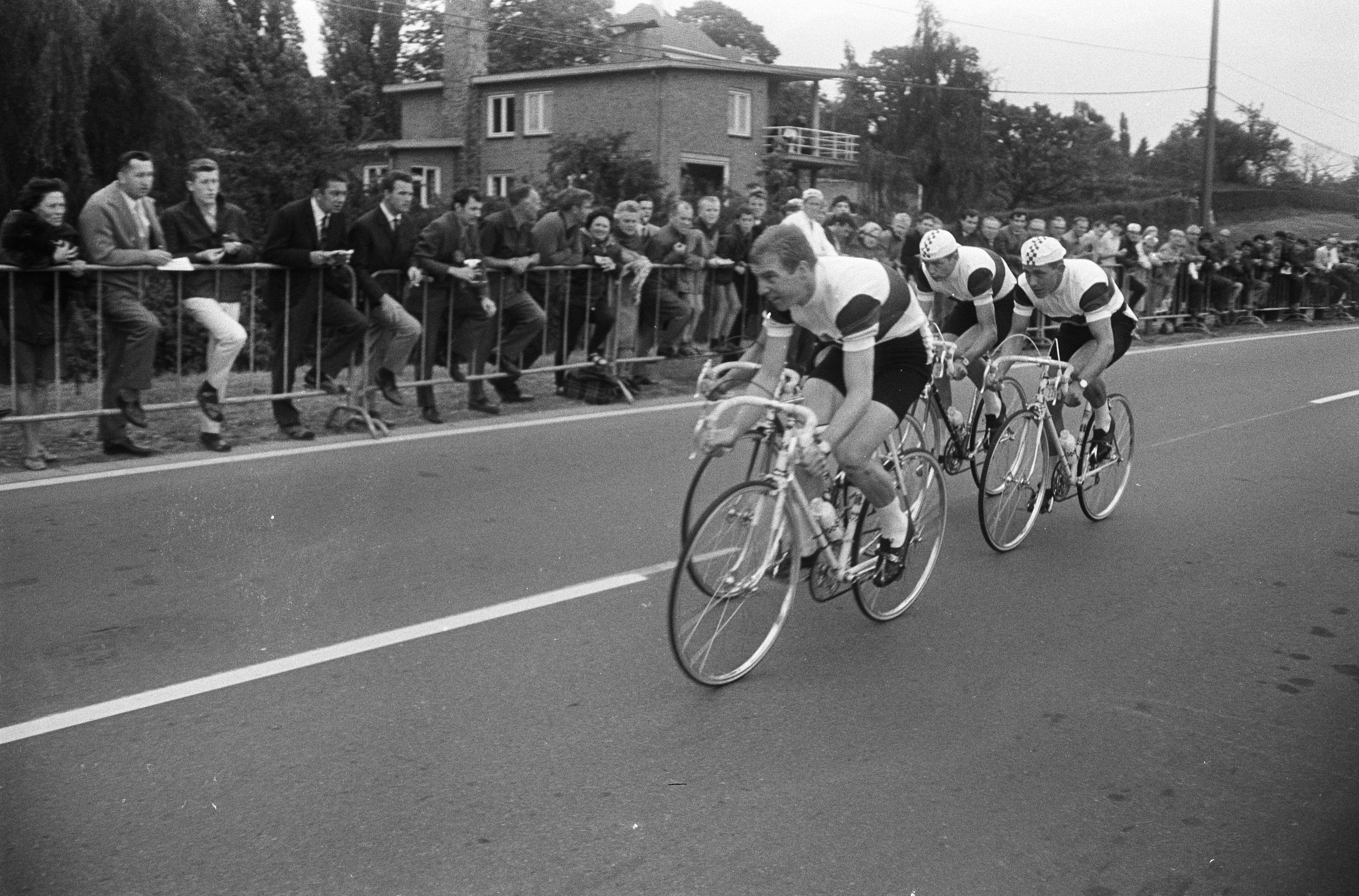
Men's team time trial

Rank	Nation	Gold	Silver	Bronze	Total
1	Great Britain (GBR)	2	0	0	2
2	Belgium (BEL)	1	0	0	1
2	Sweden (SWE)	1	0	0	1
4	Netherlands (NED)	0	1	1	2
4	Soviet Union (URS)	0	1	1	2
6	Denmark (DEN)	0	1	0	1
6	France (FRA)	0	1	0	1
8	Italy (ITA)	0	0	1	1
8	Spain (ESP)	0	0	1	1
Totals (9 entries)		4	4	4	12
