= Jean-Pierre Monseré =

Belgian cyclist (1948–1971)

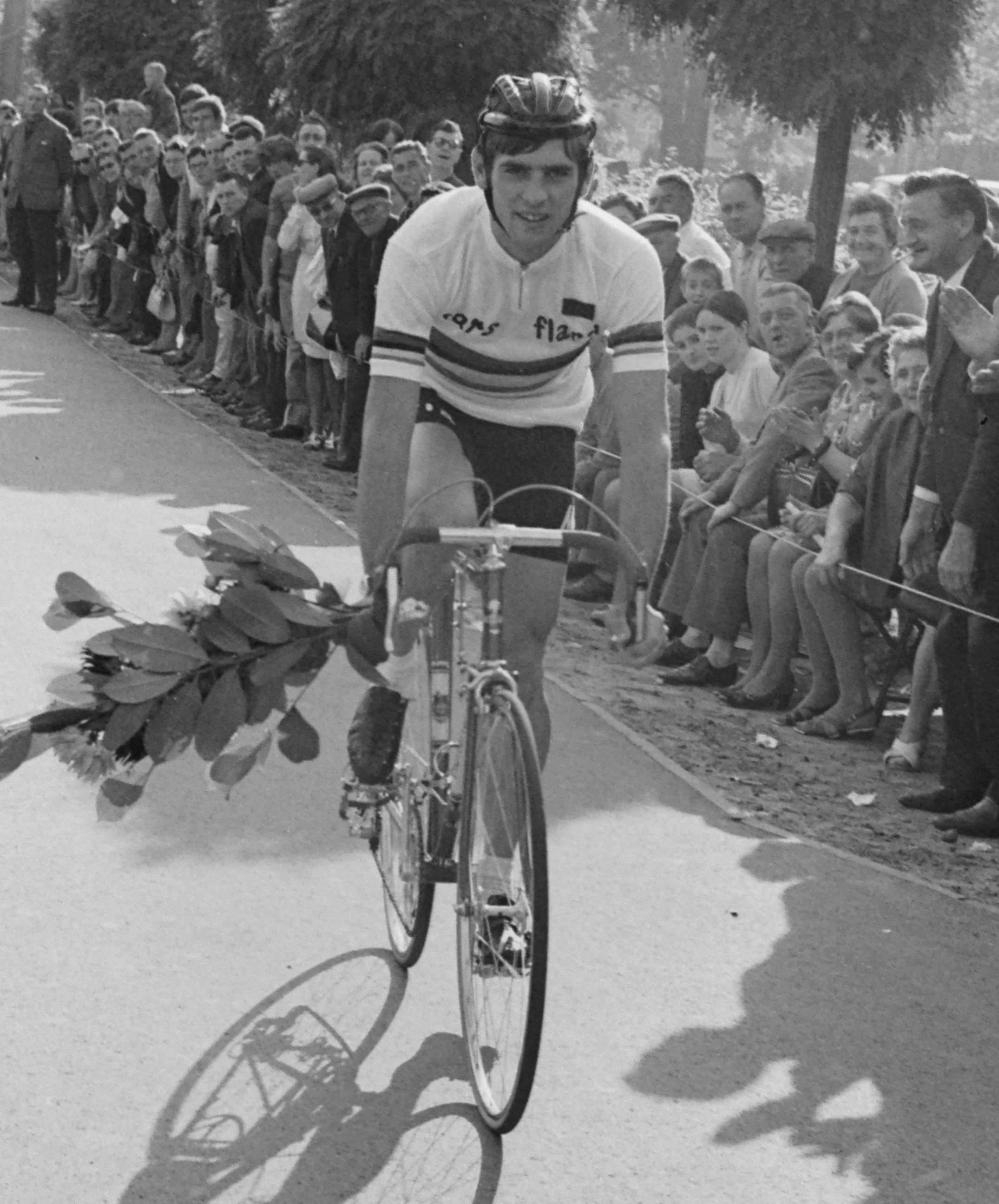
- Monseré as UCI world champion

Personal information
- Full name: Jean-Pierre Monseré
- Nickname: Jempi Monseré
- Born: 8 September 1948 Roeselare, Belgium
- Died: 15 March 1971 (aged 22) Lille, Belgium

Cycling career
- Sport: Cycling
- Discipline: Road
- Role: Rider

Professional team
- 1969–1971: Flandria–De Clerck–Krüger

Major wins
- One-day races and Classics World Road Race Championships (1970) Giro di Lombardia (1969) Stage Races Vuelta a Andalucía (1971) Track Championships National Track Championships Omnium (1970) Madison (1971)
Medal record
Representing Belgium
Men's road bicycle racing
World Championships
Gold medal – first place	1970 Leicester	Elite Road race
Silver medal – second place	1969 Zolder	Amateur Road race

Jean-Pierre "Jempi" Monseré (8 September 1948 – 15 March 1971) was a Belgian road racing cyclist who died while champion of the world.

== Career ==
=== Early life ===
As a child, the energetic Monseré excelled in different sports like football and athletics. He rode his first bicycle race in Lendelede at the age of 12, competing against fifteen-year-old cyclists.

Monseré won his first official race on 7 July 1963 in the Sint-Elooi Prize in Ruddervoorde. He managed to put this race completely in his hands and he finished with a lead of no less than 7 minutes. At 15, Monseré, already targeted by several competitors, won the Belgian Road Championship for under-novices.

In 1965, Dr. Derluyn joined the staff of Jean-Pierre Monseré. Under his guidance, "Jempi" switched from the then popular training methods, consisting of endless endurance training, to interval training. As a result, training had to be done less and they could build more peace, so a rider had much more recuperation.

=== Amateur career ===
Monseré became amateur cyclist in 1967. In the Belgian Road Championship, he and Roger De Vlaeminck were considered as favourites. But their rivalry both cost them the title with Monseré ending second.

The following year, he again finished as second in the Belgian Road Championship.

Following his victory in the mountain race GP Peugeot, Monseré was included in the Belgian national team for the 1968 Summer Olympics as a support rider for Roger De Vlaeminck. After De Vlaeminck crashed in a training ride, Monseré could ride for himself and finished in 6th place in the individual road race.

Once more, Monseré ended as second in the 1969 Belgian Road Championship. In his last World Amateur Championship, he hoped to win the world title in Brno, Czechoslovakia. However, the Dane Leif Mortensen was crowned world champion. Monseré won the silver medal and compatriot Staf Van Roosbroeck bronze.

=== Professional career and death ===
He became professional for Flandria in 1969, and won the Giro di Lombardia that year, after Gerben Karstens tested positive for taking amphetamines. A year later, Monseré became the Belgian track omnium champion.

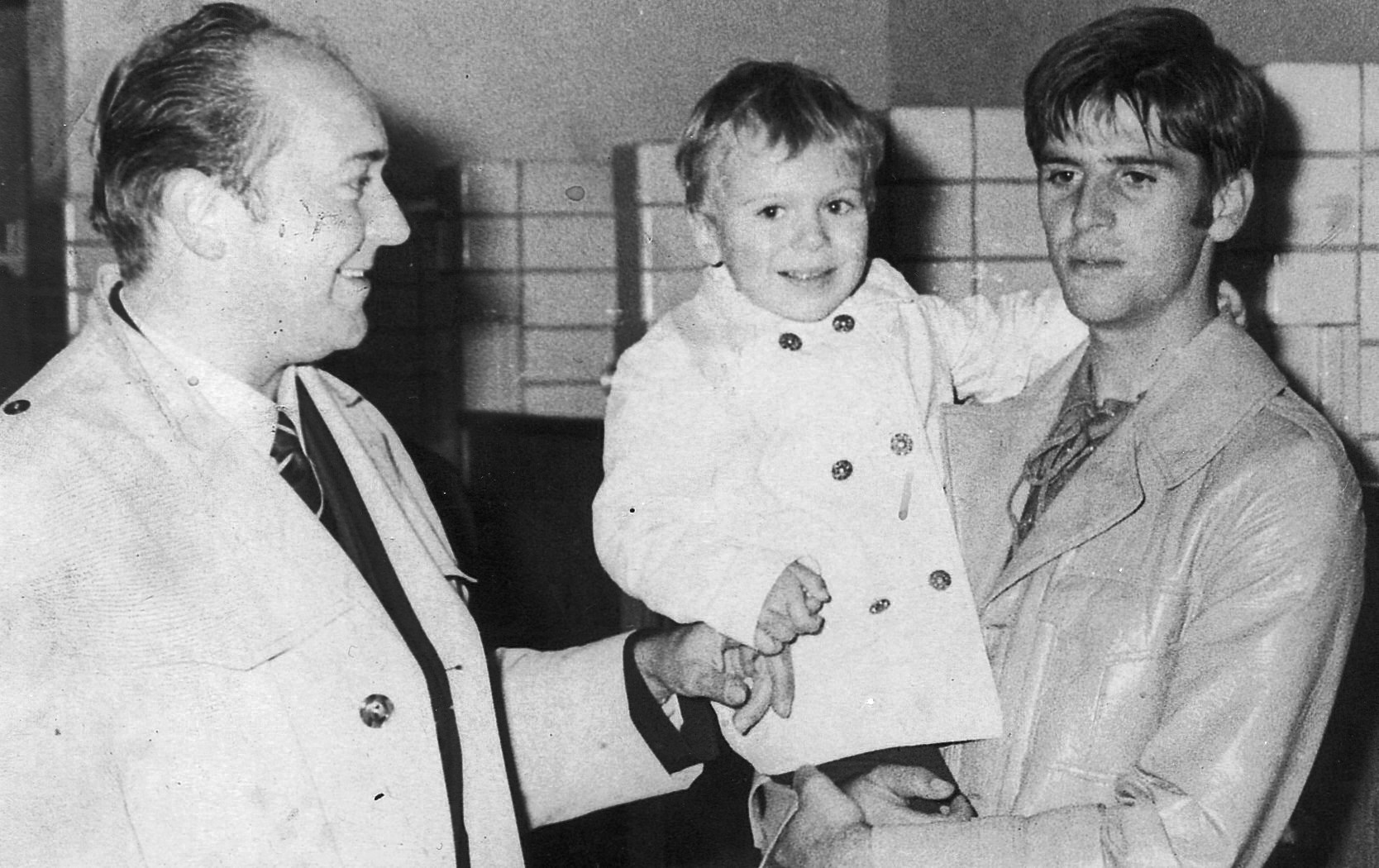
Monseré with son at Het Kuipje after winning the 1970 Six Days of Ghent

Monseré continued to affirm his exceptional qualities, including his self-discipline and hunger for victory. He owed a lot to the strong bond with his blind masseur Jacques Delva, who, among other things, let him perform the basic yoga asanas.

He was selected in the Belgian team for the 1970 World Championship in Leicester, England. In the final, Eddy Merckx encouraged Monseré to chase the leading cyclists, saying 'if you want to win, you have to go to Gimondi'. Monseré escaped with a small group and eventually won the world championship. He was the second-youngest world champion after another Belgian, Karel Kaers.

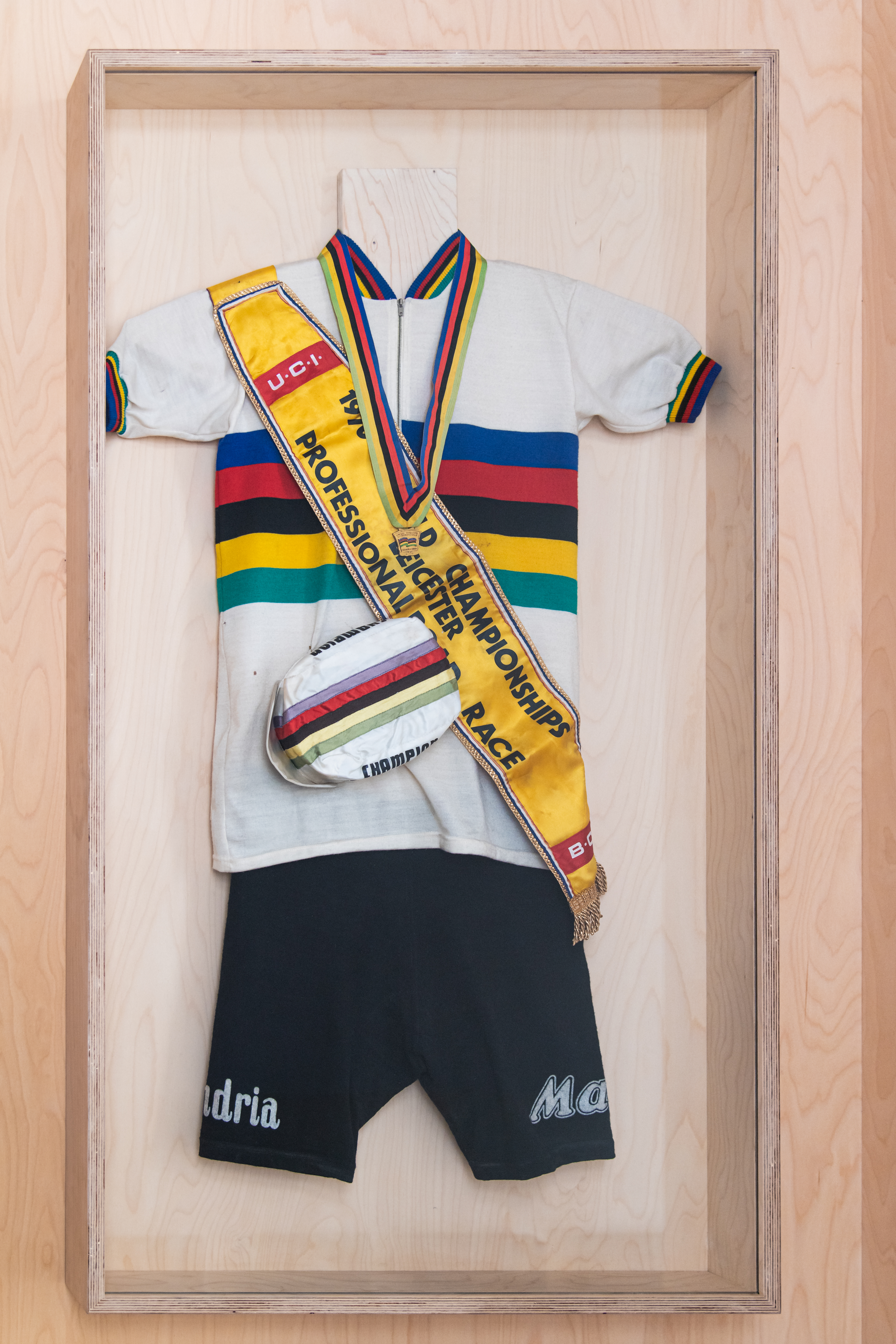
World champion jersey, ribbon and cap of Monseré

In 1971, he was again Belgian track champion, this time in the madison discipline. On the road, he won the Vuelta a Andalucía in February 1971.

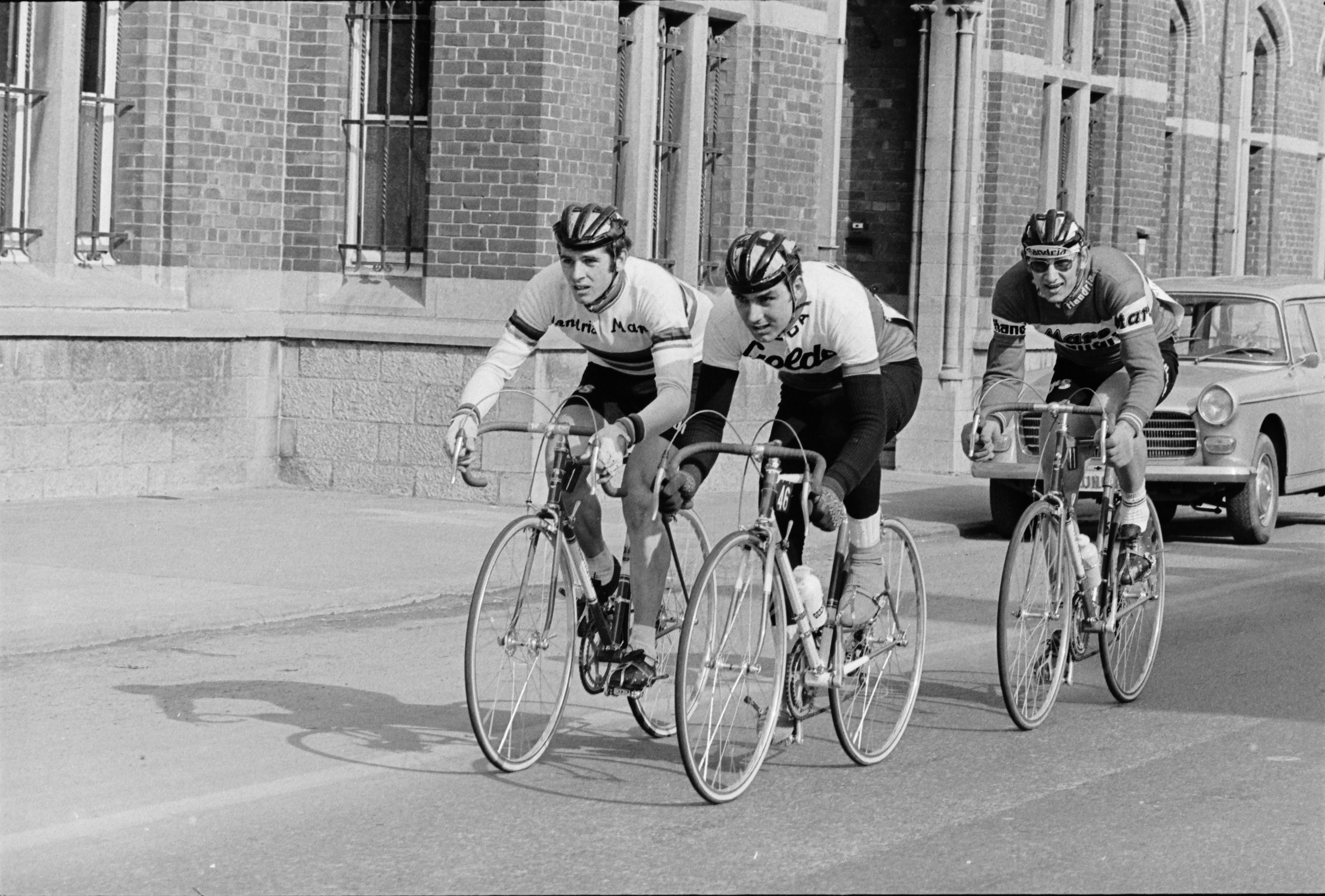
Monseré (left) in the 1971 Omloop van het Zuidwesten, 2 days before his death

On 15 March 1971, Monseré was riding the Grote Jaarmarktprijs in Retie after being convinced by Eric and Roger De Vlaeminck to participate. Monseré realised it was good training for Milan–San Remo the following weekend. On the road from Lille to Gierle, he and Roger De Vlaeminck agreed they had trained enough and they were about to exit the race. However, when Monseré looked back to estimate the distance with the peloton, a car driving onto the course collided head-on with Monseré killing him outright. Within a few minutes, a local doctor was with him but he could only diagnose the cyclist's death. His funeral was attended by more than 20,000 people, including several government ministers, and top cyclists including Eddy Merckx, Roger De Vlaeminck, Patrick Sercu and Joop Zoetemelk. Merckx placed the flowers he had received after his Milan–San Remo victory on the coffin. In a cruel twist of fate, in 1976 Monseré's seven-year-old son Giovanni died after a collision with a car, while riding his racing bike which was given to him on his first communion by a family friend, another world champion Freddy Maertens. Like his father, the little boy was also wearing a rainbow jersey.

== Aftermath ==
Investigation of the accident showed blunders of both the local law enforcement forces and the race organization. As it was a small local race, the gendarmerie had refused to cooperate, and the police did not find it necessary to stop traffic on the course. Moreover, other than a car driving in front, there were no other signs warning that a race was ongoing. The driver of the car, a woman in her twenties, was not blamed. Following the accident, the regulations related to cycling races at all levels were tightened.

In a documentary years later, Roger De Vlaeminck stated that "Merckx would have had a lot of trouble with him. Monseré was better than him, I think. He was more of an all-rounder. He could sprint and climb very well. He rode … also more reasoned than Merckx and me. In my view, he had to do less to achieve the same results."

Jean-Pierre Monseré is remembered each year with a memorial cycle trophy, the Grote Herdenkingsprijs Monseré, organized by the Retiese Wielerclub 'De Zonnestraal'. Jempi Monseré's medals are in the Belgian national cycle museum in Roeselare.

== Major results ==
=== Road ===
1966
2nd Road race, National Under-23 Championships
1967
1st Stage 1 Amateur Ronde van Limburg
2nd Road race, National Amateur Championships
5th Ronde Van Vlaanderen Beloften
1968
1st Amateur Elfstedenronde
1st Trophée Peugeot
National Amateur Championships

2nd Road race
3rd Interclubs road race

6th Road race, Olympic Games
1969
1st Giro di Lombardia
1st Amateur Omloop der Vlaamse Gewesten
1st Amateur Omloop Het Volk
2nd Road race, UCI Amateur World Championships
2nd Road race, National Amateur Championships
2nd Coppa Ugo Agostoni
2nd Circuit de Wallonie
3rd Kampioenschap van Vlaanderen
6th Grand Prix de Fourmies
1970
1st Road race, UCI World Championships
1st Stage 1 Paris–Luxembourg
Vuelta a Andalucía

1st Stages 2 & 4

1st Omloop der Zuid-West-Vlaamse Bergen
1st Zomergem–Adinkerke
1st Stage 1 (TTT) Four Days of Dunkirk
2nd Kampioenschap van Vlaanderen
2nd Bruxelles–Meulebeke
2nd Omloop van de Grensstreek
2nd Omloop van de Leievallei
2nd Omloop van het Houtland
2nd GP Roeselare
3rd Road race, National Championships
4th Critérium des As
4th Druivenkoers Overijse
6th Tour of Flanders
8th Gent–Wevelgem
8th La Flèche Wallonne
10th Paris–Roubaix
1971
1st Overall Vuelta a Andalucía

1st Stages 1 & 3

2nd Omloop van het Zuidwesten
9th Circuit des Onze Villes
10th Kuurne–Brussels–Kuurne

=== Track ===
1967
1st Team pursuit, National Amateur Championships
1968
1st Team pursuit, National Amateur Championships
1970
1st Omnium, National Amateur Championships
1st Six Days of Ghent (with Patrick Sercu)
1st Omnium of Antwerp (with Patrick Sercu and Roger De Vlaeminck)
1st Omnium of Milan (with Eddy Merckx)
1st Omnium of Ghent, October (with Patrick Sercu)
2nd Omnium of Ghent, January (with Roger De Vlaeminck and Erik De Vlaeminck)
1971
1st Madison, National Championships (with Patrick Sercu)
1st Omnium of Brussels (with Eddy Merckx, Roger De Vlaeminck and Ferdinand Bracke)
2nd Six Days of Antwerp (with Dieter Kemper and Julien Stevens)

== Honours ==
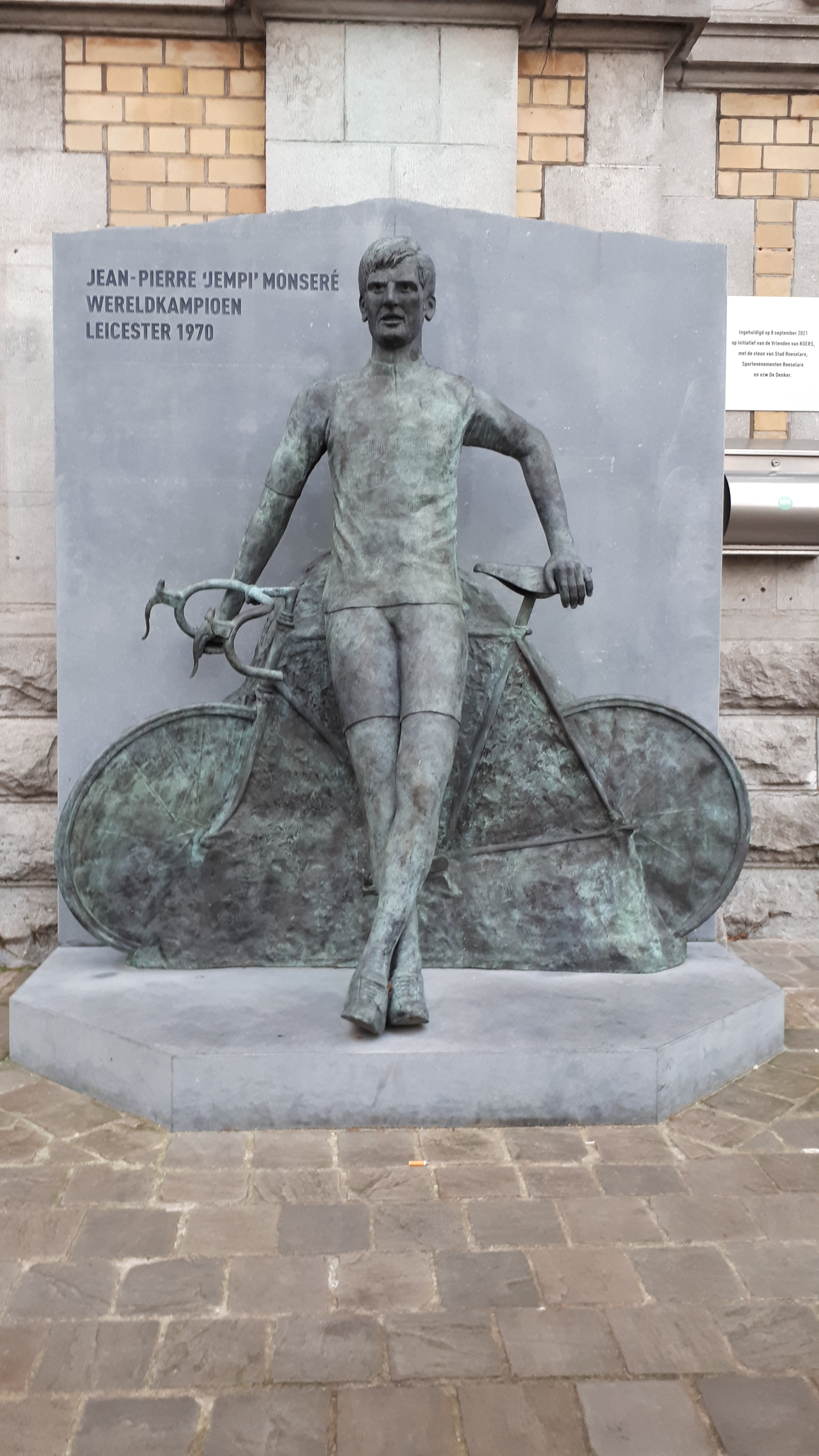
Statue of Jean-Pierre Monseré in Roeselare

- A monument in Lille in 1971.
- nl:De Dood van een Sandwichman, a 1972 film documentary by Robbe de Hert and Guido Henderickx.
- A cycle race, Grote Trofee J.P. Monseré in Lille, from 1976.
- A street, Jean-Pierre Monseréstraat in Roeselare and a road, Monseréweg in Lille.
- KOERS museum in Roeselare in 1998
- A professional cycle race, Grote Prijs Jean-Pierre Monseré, from 2012.
- A statue in Roeselare in 2021

== Books ==
- De dood van Jempi by Jan Emiel Daele in 1972, 89 p. (Dutch) 5950991
- Jempi – Getuigenissen over wereldkampioen 1970 by Manu Adriaens and Eddy Brouckaert in 1986, 95 p. (Dutch) ISBN 9789094007386
- Jean-Pierre Monseré, voor altijd 22 by Mark van Hamme in 2011, 296 p. (Dutch) ISBN 9789086792856
- Monseré by Mark van Hamme in 2020, 120 p. (Dutch) ISBN 9789463887533

== See also ==
- Curse of the rainbow jersey
- List of professional cyclists who died during a race
