= Fåglum brothers =

Swedish cyclists

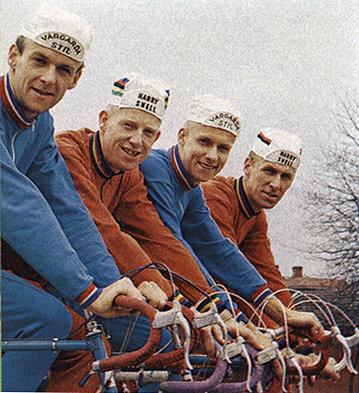
The Fåglum brothers 1967

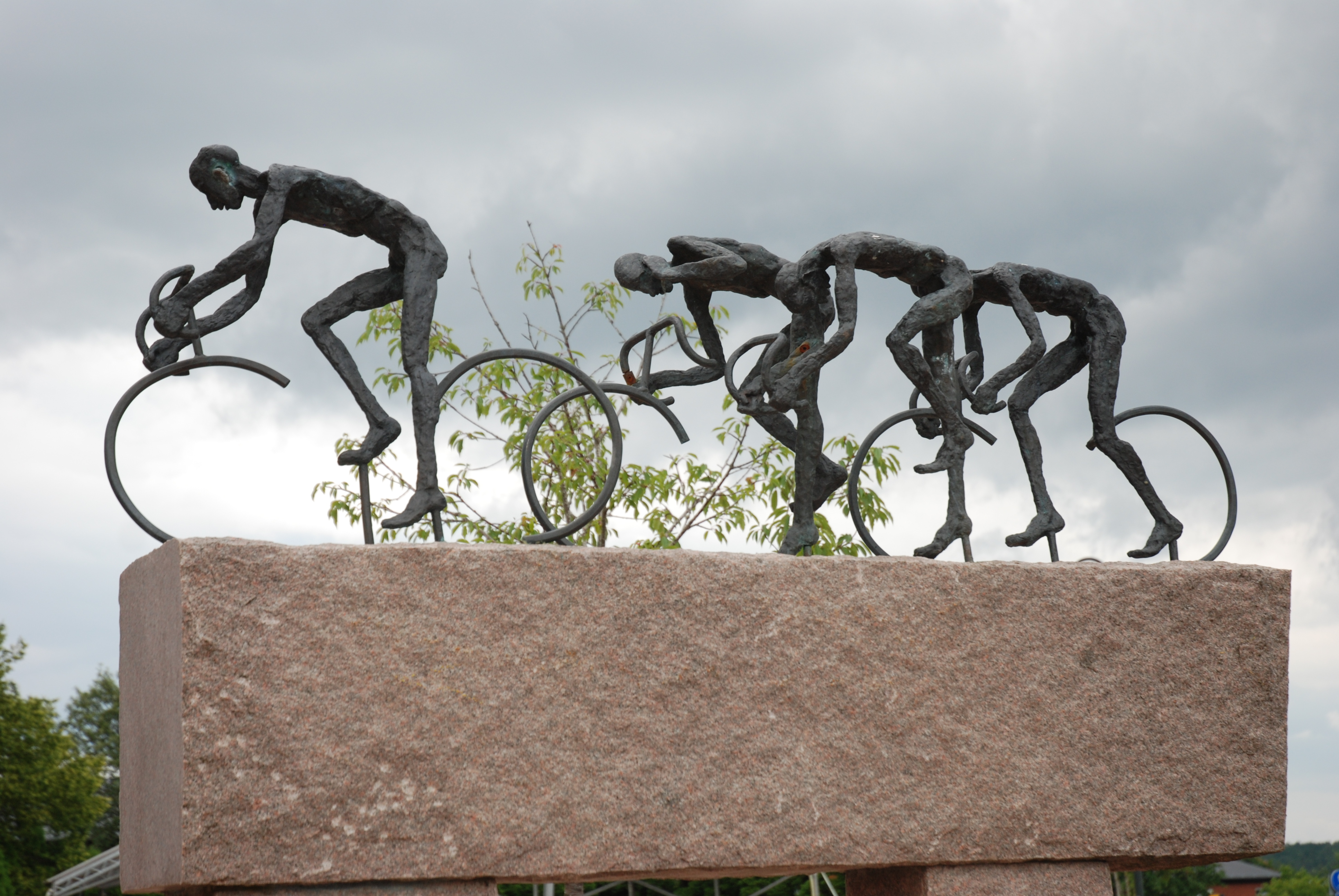
The Fåglum brothers in Vårgårda.

The Fåglum brothers were Swedish cyclist Erik, Gösta, Sture and Tomas Pettersson. The brothers won the team time trial World Amateur Cycling Championships between 1967–1969 along with a silver medal at the 1968 Summer Olympics. They were all awarded the Svenska Dagbladet Gold Medal in 1967.

The brothers' cousin is Swedish ice hockey player Kenneth Ekman, the grandfather of ice hockey player Oliver Ekman-Larsson and footballer Amanda Ilestedt.
