= Yuri Manuylov =

Russian cyclist

Personal information
- Born: 10 June 1964 (age 62) Krasnodar, Russia

Cycling career
- Sport: Cycling
- Current team: Retired
- Discipline: Road
- Role: Rider

Professional teams
- 1991–1993: Lotus–Festina
- 1994: Rotator Company–Alex
- 1995: Sputnik–SOI

Yuri Manuylov (born 10 June 1964 in Krasnodar) is a Russian former cyclist.

== Major results ==
1989
3rd Team time trial, World Road Championships
1990
1st Duo Normand (with Dimitri Vassilichenko)
1st Stage 7 Settimana Ciclistica Lombarda
1st Stage 8 Tour de Normandie
1st Overall Tour du Poitou-Charentes

1st Stage 4

3rd Overall Tour du Gévaudan Languedoc-Roussillon

1st Stage 2

1991
1st Stage 3 Vuelta a Castilla y León
1992
1st Stage 5 Volta a Portugal
1993
5th Rund um Köln

=== Grand Tour general classification results timeline ===
Grand Tour	1991	1992	1993
Giro d'Italia	—	—	108
Tour de France	—	—	—
Vuelta a España	86	—	—

Legend
—	Did not compete
DNF	Did not finish
