= Galgbacken, Vårgårda =

Coordinates: 58.042264°N 12.818452°E

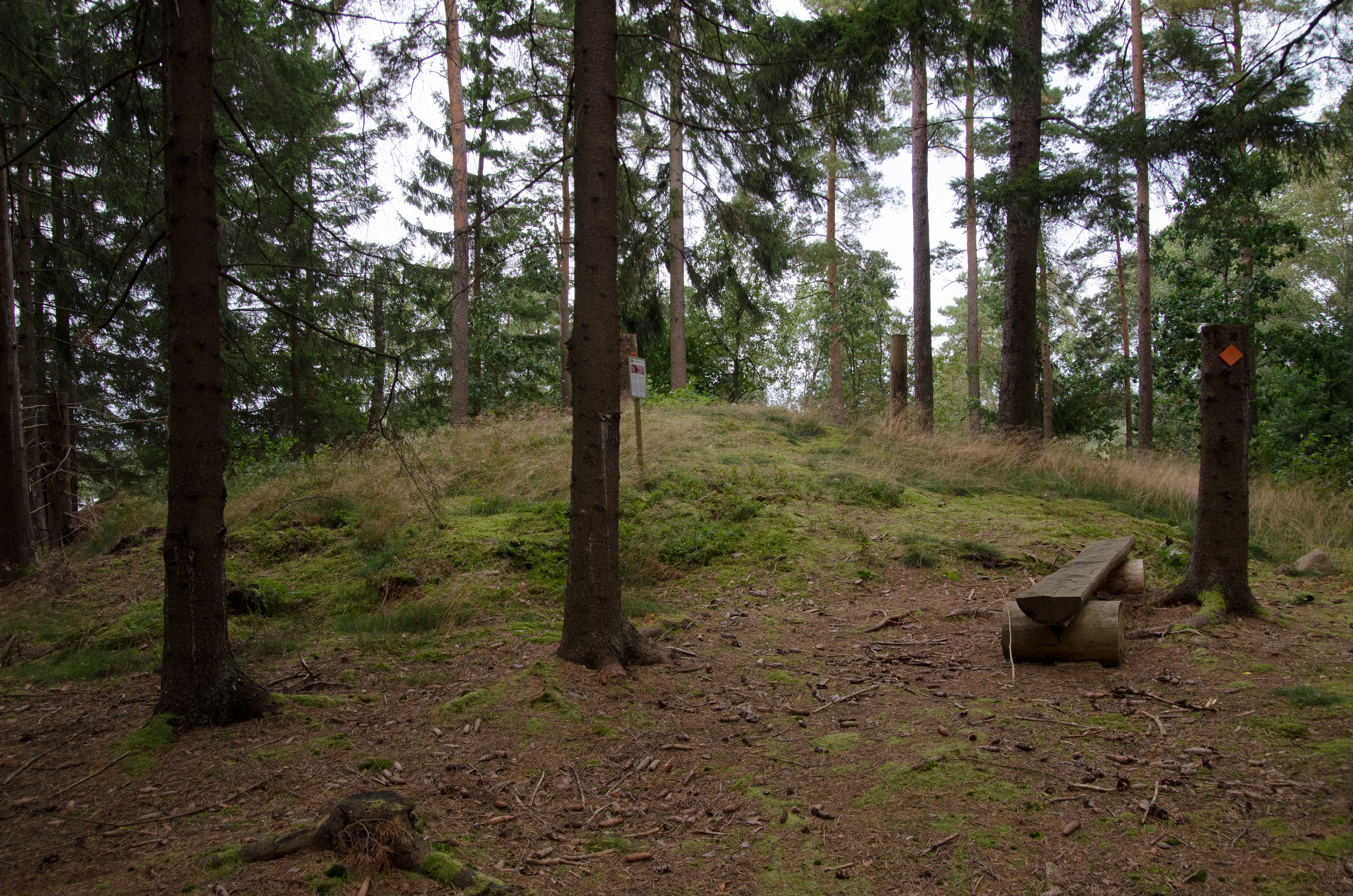
Vargarda galgbacken

Galgbackn, Vårgårda is a small town in Sweden that was the site of two execution facilities.

One was approximately at the location where the current water tower is today. The place has been called Kåkakullen. The word is an old expression for a place where they hang people. The second was Northwest of the current Orregatan on the top of Kåkakullen. It is the better-preserved site.

== History ==
Some bodies were left for public viewing after the execution. Complaints from residents and from the priest led to the end of executions there. The last execution took place on May 12, 1859, when Karlsson-Pelur was executed. Karlsson was convicted of carrying out three robberies and one murder. Executions attracted many spectators, especially given that the railway was completed two years earlier.

An essay about the execution states "Han gick lägga tjoka på ett bräe". This meant that a prisoner had put his chin on a board so his blood could be collected in a bowl. The blood would then be used to cure diseases, it was said that the blood could cure most diseases.

The Göteborgs-Posten wrote a notice of execution, where it said "He walked calmly towards his destiny". A ring of trusted men was formed around the place of execution to prevent escapes.

Kåkakullen held several burial mounds dating to between 1 100-0 B.C.
