= Oleg Galkin =

Soviet cyclist

Personal information
- Born: 1 May 1965 Ishim, Soviet Union
- Died: 10 May 2003 (aged 38)

Cycling career
- Sport: Cycling

Oleg Vladimirovich Galkin, also Oleh Halkin (1 May 1965 – 10 May 2003) was a Soviet and Ukrainian cyclist. His name was spelled Oleh Halkin as transliterated from Ukrainian when he competed for post-Soviet Ukraine.

In 1990 he was world champion (as part of the Soviet Union cycling team) in 100 km team racing and bronze medalist in 1989. He competed in the 100 km. team time trial at the 1992 Summer Olympics for the Unified Team, which took 4th place.

== Biography ==
Galkin was born and raised in Ishim, Tyumen Oblast, where he graduated from school #8. In 1987 he graduated from Kiev State Institute of Physical Culture. He is merited master of sports (1990). In 1990s he moved to Canada. He spent his last years in Kiev suffering from leukemia. He is interred at the Baikove Cemetery, Kiev. Since 2012, the annual open championship of Ishim in cycling dedicated to the memory of Galkin has been organized.
