= 1971 Paris–Nice =

Race details
- Dates: 10–17 March 1971
- Stages: 7 + Prologue
- Distance: 1,154.9 km (717.6 mi)
- Winning time: 30h 21' 38"

Results
Jersey awarded to the overall winner	Winner	Eddy Merckx (BEL)	(Molteni)
	Second	Gösta Pettersson (SWE)	(Ferretti)
	Third	Luis Ocaña (ESP)	(Bic)

The 1971 Paris–Nice was the 29th edition of the Paris–Nice cycle race and was held from 10 March to 17 March 1971. The race started in Paris and finished in Nice. The race was won by Eddy Merckx of the Molteni team.

== General classification ==
Final general classification

Rank	Rider	Team	Time
1	Eddy Merckx (BEL)	Molteni	30h 21' 38"
2	Gösta Pettersson (SWE)	Ferretti	+ 58"
3	Luis Ocaña (ESP)	Bic	+ 1' 09"
4	Désiré Letort (FRA)	Bic	+ 1' 13"
5	Erik Pettersson (SWE)	Ferretti	+ 2' 36"
6	Lucien Aimar (FRA)	Sonolor–Lejeune	+ 2' 41"
7	Jos Deschoenmaecker (BEL)	Molteni	+ 4' 12"
8	Charles Rouxel (FRA)	Peugeot–BP–Michelin	+ 4' 17"
9	Frans Mintjens (BEL)	Molteni	+ 5' 59"
10	Jack Mourioux (FRA)	Fagor–Mercier–Hutchinson	+ 6' 28"
