= Östadkulle =

- Location within Västra Götaland Location within Sweden
- Coordinates: 58°01′N 12°38′E
- Country: Sweden
- Province: Västergötland
- County: Västra Götaland County
- Municipality: Vårgårda Municipality

Area
  - Total: 0.28 km^{2} (0.11 sq mi)

Population (31 December 2010)
  - Total: 245
  - Density: 868/km^{2} (2,250/sq mi)
- Time zone: UTC+1 (CET)
  - Summer (DST): UTC+2 (CEST)

Östadkulle is a locality situated in Vårgårda Municipality, Västra Götaland County, Sweden with 245 inhabitants in 2010.
