= 1970 UCI Road World Championships – Men's road race =

Men's Individual Road Race
1970 UCI Road World Championships
- Rainbow jersey

Race details
- Dates: 16 August 1970
- Stages: 1
- Distance: 271.96 km (169.0 mi)
- Winning time: 6h 33' 58"

Results
| | Winner | Jean-Pierre Monseré (BEL) | (Belgium) |
| | Second | Leif Mortensen (DEN) | (Denmark) |
| | Third | Felice Gimondi (ITA) | (Italy) |

The men's road race at the 1970 UCI Road World Championships was the 37th edition of the event. The race took place on Sunday 16 August 1970 in Leicester, England. The race was won by Jean-Pierre Monseré of Belgium.

== Final classification ==
General classification (1–10)

| Rank | Rider | Time |
|---|---|---|
| 1st place, gold medalist(s) | Jean-Pierre Monseré (BEL) | 6h 33' 58" |
| 2nd place, silver medalist(s) | Leif Mortensen (DEN) | + 2" |
| 3rd place, bronze medalist(s) | Felice Gimondi (ITA) | + 2" |
| 4 | Les West (GBR) | + 3" |
| 5 | Charles Rouxel (FRA) | + 5" |
| 6 | Alain Vasseur (FRA) | + 9" |
| 7 | Walter Godefroot (BEL) | + 18" |
| 8 | Frans Verbeeck (BEL) | + 18" |
| 9 | Franco Bitossi (ITA) | + 18" |
| 10 | Gerard Vianen (NED) | + 18" |
