= 1969 Giro di Lombardia =

Race details
- Dates: 11 October 1969
- Stages: 1
- Distance: 266 km (165.3 mi)
- Winning time: 6h 38' 54"

Results
	Winner	Jean-Pierre Monseré (BEL)	(Flandria–De Clerck–Krüger)
	Second	Herman Van Springel (BEL)	(Dr. Mann–Grundig)
	Third	Franco Bitossi (ITA)	(Filotex)

The 1969 Giro di Lombardia was the 63rd edition of the Giro di Lombardia cycle race and was held on 11 October 1969. The race started in Milan and finished in Como. The race was won by Jean-Pierre Monseré of the Flandria team.

== General classification ==
Final general classification (Note: Gerben Karstens arrived first, but was disqualified for failing a dope test.)

Rank	Rider	Team	Time
1	Jean-Pierre Monseré (BEL)	Flandria–De Clerck–Krüger	6h 38' 54"
2	Herman Van Springel (BEL)	Dr. Mann–Grundig	+ 0"
3	Franco Bitossi (ITA)	Filotex	+ 0"
4	Martin Van Den Bossche (BEL)	Faema	+ 0"
5	Raymond Poulidor (FRA)	Mercier–BP–Hutchinson	+ 0"
6	Georges Pintens (BEL)	Dr. Mann–Grundig	+ 0"
7	André Poppe (BEL)	Dr. Mann–Grundig	+ 0"
8	Raymond Delisle (FRA)	Peugeot–BP–Michelin	+ 0"
9	Jan Janssen (NED)	Bic	+ 19"
10	Antoine Houbrechts (BEL)	Flandria–De Clerck–Krüger	+ 19"
