= Leif Mortensen =

Danish cyclist (born 1946)

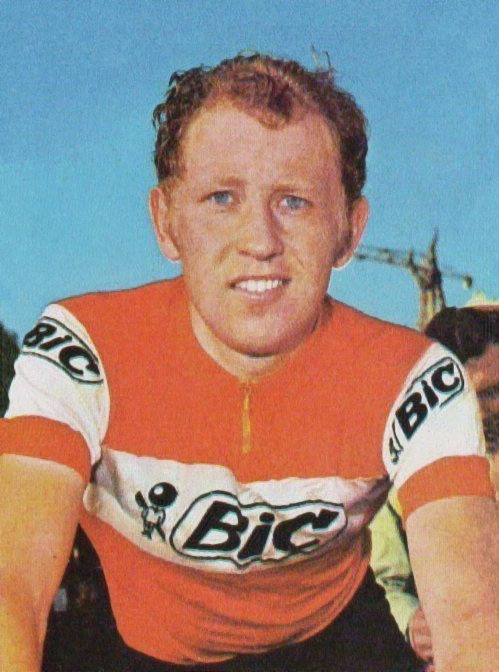
- Leif Mortensen c. 1973

Personal information
- Full name: Leif Mortensen
- Born: 5 May 1946 (age 80) Copenhagen, Denmark
- Height: 1.80 m (5 ft 11 in)
- Weight: 70 kg (154 lb)

Cycling career
- Sport: Cycling
- Discipline: Road
- Role: Rider

Professional teams
- 1970–1974: Bic
- 1975: Maes Pils–Watney
Medal record
Representing Denmark
Men's road bicycle racing
Olympic Games
Silver medal – second place	1968 Mexico City	Road race
World Championships
Gold medal – first place	1969 Brno	Amateur road race
Silver medal – second place	1967 Heerlen	Amateur team time trial
Silver medal – second place	1969 Brno	Amateur team time trial
Silver medal – second place	1970 Leicester	Professional road race

Leif Mortensen (born 5 May 1946) is a Danish former professional road bicycle racer. He won a silver medal in the individual road race at the 1968 Summer Olympics and in the road race at the 1970 UCI Road World Championships.

== Major results ==
1963
2nd Time trial, National Junior Road Championships
1967
2nd Team time trial, UCI Road World Championships
1968
2nd Road race, Olympic Games
1969
UCI Amateur Road World Championships

1st Road race
2nd Team time trial

7th Overall Tour de l'Avenir
1970
2nd Road race, UCI Road World Championships
2nd Grand Prix de Fourmies
2nd Trofeo Baracchi (with Ole Ritter)
3rd Subida a Arrate
3rd Genoa–Nice
4th Grand Prix des Nations
6th Overall Tour de Luxembourg
7th Grand Prix d'Isbergues
8th Overall Paris–Luxembourg
8th Bordeaux–Paris
9th Overall Four Days of Dunkirk
10th Paris–Tours
10th Tour du Haut Var
1971
1st Trofeo Baracchi (with Luis Ocaña)
3rd Overall Tour de Luxembourg
3rd Grand Prix des Nations
4th Gent–Wevelgem
5th Overall Étoile des Espoirs
6th Road race, UCI Road World Championships
6th Overall Tour de France
7th Overall Setmana Catalana de Ciclisme

1st Stage 4b

10th Grand Prix de Fourmies
1972
Vuelta a Levante

1st Prologue & Stage 2

2nd Overall Grand Prix de Fourmies
6th Overall Paris–Nice
6th Liège–Bastogne–Liège
6th Trofeo Laigueglia
7th Road race, UCI Road World Championships
7th Overall Tour du Nord
9th Overall Tour de Luxembourg
9th La Flèche Wallonne
1973
1st Overall Tour of Belgium

1st Stage 5b (ITT)

2nd Subida a Arrate
2nd Grand Prix de Cannes
3rd Trofeo Laigueglia
5th Overall Paris–Nice

1st Stage 5

7th Liège–Bastogne–Liège
8th Overall Tour de Luxembourg
10th Tour du Haut Var
1974
3rd Bordeaux–Paris
8th Overall Paris–Nice
10th Tour du Haut Var

=== Grand Tour general classification results timeline ===
Grand Tour	1971	1972	1973	1974
Vuelta a España	—	23	—	—
Giro d'Italia	—	—	—	—
Tour de France	6	12	19	DNF

Legend
—	Did not compete
DNF	Did not finish
