= Flavio Martini =

Italian cyclist (born 1945)

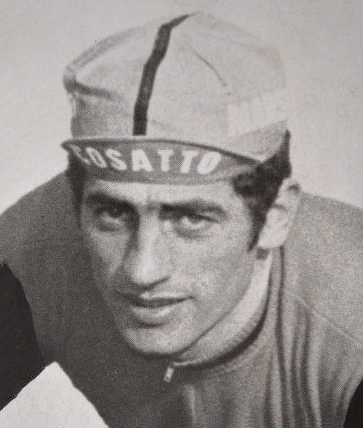
- Martini in 1970

Personal information
- Born: 13 January 1945 (age 81) Galliera Veneta, Padua, Italy
- Height: 166 cm (5 ft 5 in)
- Weight: 65 kg (143 lb)

Cycling career
- Sport: Cycling
Medal record
Men's cycling
Representing Italy
UCI Road World Championships
Bronze medal – third place	1967 Heerlen	Team time trial
Bronze medal – third place	1968 Imola	Team time trial

Flavio Martini (born 13 January 1945) is a former Italian road cyclist. As an amateur, he won bronze medals in the 100 km team time trial at the 1967 and 1968 world championships and placed 31st in the individual road race at the 1968 Summer Olympics in Mexico City. After the Olympics, he turned professional, but with little success.
