= 1972 UCI Road World Championships =

Cycling competition

- Venue: Gap, France
- Date: 5-6 August 1972
- Coordinates: 44°33′34″N 6°4′43″E
- Events: 2

The 1972 UCI Road World Championships took place from 5-6 August 1972 in Gap, France. Only two professional races took place due to the Munich Olympics.

In the same period, the 1972 UCI Track Cycling World Championships were organized in Marseille.

== Results ==
Race:	Gold:	Time	Silver:	Time	Bronze :	Time
Men's race
Men's road race	Marino Basso; Italy	7 h 05 min 59s	Franco Bitossi; Italy	-	Cyrille Guimard; France	-
Women's race
Women's road race	Geneviève Gambillon; France	-	Lubov Zadoroznaya; Soviet Union	-	Anna Konkina; Soviet Union	-

== Medal table ==
Rank	Nation	Gold	Silver	Bronze	Total
1	Italy (ITA)	1	1	0	2
2	France (FRA)	1	0	1	2
3	Soviet Union (URS)	0	1	1	2
Totals (3 entries)		2	2	2	6
