= Gösta Pettersson =

Swedish cyclist

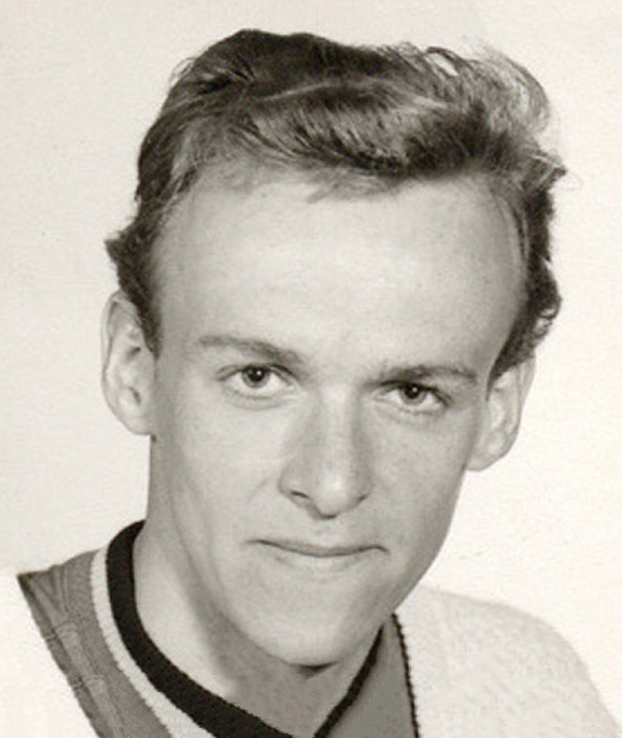
- Pettersson c. 1960

Personal information
- Full name: Gösta Artur Roland Pettersson
- Born: 23 November 1940 (age 85) Alingsås, Sweden
- Height: 189 cm (6 ft 2 in)
- Weight: 75 kg (165 lb)

Cycling career
- Sport: Cycling
- Discipline: Road
- Role: Rider
- Rider type: All-rounder

Professional teams
- 1970–1972: Ferretti
- 1973: Scic
- 1974: Magniflex

Major wins
- Grand Tours Giro d'Italia General classification (1971) 1 individual stage (1972) Stage races Tour de Romandie (1970)
Medal record
Men's road bicycle racing
Representing Sweden
Olympic Games
Silver medal – second place	1968 Mexico City	Team road race
Bronze medal – third place	1964 Tokyo	Team road race
Bronze medal – third place	1968 Mexico City	Individual road race
World Championships
Gold medal – first place	1967 Heerlen	Team time trial
Gold medal – first place	1968 Imola	Team time trial
Gold medal – first place	1969 Zolder	Team time trial
Bronze medal – third place	1964 Sallanches	Amateur's road race

Gösta Artur Roland Pettersson (born 23 November 1940) is a retired Swedish cyclist. As an amateur, he competed in the individual and team road events at the 1960, 1964 and 1968 Olympics and won one silver and two bronze medals, in 1964 and 1968. In 1968 he also took part in two track events: individual and team 4000 m pursuit.

Pettersson's brothers, Erik, Sture and Tomas, were also Olympic cyclists, and their quartet was known as the Fåglum brothers. They won the World Amateur Cycling Championships in 1967–1969 and a team silver medal at the 1968 Summer Olympics; three of the brothers were also part of the bronze-winning road team at the 1964 Games. In 1967 they were awarded the Svenska Dagbladet Gold Medal.

After the 1969 World Championships the Fåglum brothers turned professional. In 1970 Gösta won the Tour de Romandie, Coppa Sabatini and Trofeo Baracchi (with brother Tomas), and finished third at the Tour de France and sixth at the Giro d'Italia. Next year he won the Giro d'Italia, Giro dell'Appennino and Giro delle Marche. During the 1971 Giro he only managed to finish on the stage podium twice and did not win any stages, but was able to win the Maglia Rosa by finishing higher than the GC riders in the time trials and staying with or ahead of them in the mountains.

He finished sixth at the 1972 Giro d'Italia and seventh at the 1973 Tour de Suisse. During the Giro he defeated Merckx in a sprint finish on stage 7 to claim a stage win and come within only +0:10 of Merckx for the overall lead, the only competitor even close to Merckx in the standings. He stayed with the two time Giro champ for the next several stages but ended up losing time in the split time trial of stage 11 and fell back in the standings.

His last major success was second place at the 1974 Tour de Suisse.

Of the Grand Tours he preferred to ride the Giro, competing from 1970 to 1974 finishing in the top ten four times, never finishing worse than 13th. He rode the Tour De France in 1970 finishing on the podium behind Eddy Merckx and Joop Zoetemelk.

After finishing atop the podium in the Giro, ahead of Herman Van Springel and Italian rider Ugo Colombo, he started the 1971 TDF, but abandoned the race prior to reaching the Jaques Anquetil Velodrome.

Pettersson never raced in the Vuelta.

== Major results ==
1962
National Road Championships

1st Time trial
2nd Road race

2nd Overall Tour de Tunisie

1st Stage 4

1963
1st Time trial, National Road Championships
1964
National Road Championships

1st Time trial
3rd Road race

1st Overall Tour de Tunisie
7th Road race, Summer Olympics
1966
National Road Championships

1st Time trial
1st Team time trial (with Sture Pettersson and Erik Pettersson)

1967
1st Team time trial, UCI Road World Championships (with Sture, Tomas & Erik Pettersson)
National Road Championships

1st Time trial
1st Team time trial (with Sture Pettersson and Erik Pettersson)

1st Overall Tour du Maroc
1st Scandinavian Race Uppsala
2nd Overall Tour de Berlin
1968
1st Team time trial, UCI Road World Championships (with Sture, Tomas & Erik Pettersson)
National Road Championships

1st Team time trial (with Sture Pettersson and Erik Pettersson)
2nd Road race

1st Overall Milk Race

1st Stages 1a (ITT), 1b & 8b (ITT)

2nd Overall Tour of Yugoslavia
Summer Olympics

2nd Team time trial (with Sture, Tomas & Erik Pettersson)
3rd Road race

1969
1st Team time trial, UCI Road World Championships (with Sture, Tomas & Erik Pettersson)
National Road Championships

1st Road race
1st Time trial
1st Team time trial (with Tomas Pettersson and Erik Pettersson)

1st Overall Tour d'Algérie
3rd Overall Tour de l'Avenir

1st Prologue

1970
1st Overall Tour de Romandie

1st Stage 4b (ITT)

1st Coppa Sabatini
1st Trofeo Baracchi (with Tomas Pettersson)
1st Stage 1b (ITT) Cronostaffetta
2nd GP Lugano
2nd GP Forli
3rd Overall Tour de France
5th Giro di Romagna
5th Overall Giro di Sardegna
6th Overall Giro d'Italia
9th Gran Premio Città di Camaiore
9th GP Alghero
1971
1st Overall Giro d'Italia
1st Giro dell'Appennino
2nd Overall Paris–Nice
2nd Overall Setmana Catalana de Ciclisme
2nd Trofeo Baracchi (with Tomas Pettersson)
2nd GP Lugano
2nd Overall Giro di Sardegna
2nd Baden–Baden (with Tomas Pettersson)
3rd Milan–San Remo
3rd GP Forli
7th Giro dell'Emilia
7th Trofeo Laigueglia
1972
2nd Giro di Puglia
3rd Trofeo Baracchi (with Tomas Pettersson)
3rd GP Forli
6th Overall Giro d'Italia

1st Stage 7

6th Overall Tour de Romandie
9th Milan–San Remo
9th Overall Tirreno–Adriatico
9th Giro dell'Emilia
1973
1st Stage 1b (ITT) Cronostaffetta
2nd Trofeo Baracchi (with Davide Boifava)
3rd Overall Tirreno–Adriatico
3rd Overall Giro di Sardegna
7th Overall Tour de Suisse

1st Stage 8b (ITT)

8th Overall Tour de Romandie
10th Giro dell'Emilia
1974
2nd Overall Tour de Suisse
2nd Trofeo Baracchi (with Martín Emilio Rodríguez)
4th Overall Volta a Catalunya
4th GP Lugano
6th Giro di Toscana
8th Coppa Placci
10th Overall Giro d'Italia
10th Giro di Campania

=== Grand Tour general classification results timeline ===
Grand Tour	1970	1971	1972	1973	1974
Vuelta a España	—	—	—	—	—
Giro d'Italia	6	1	6	13	10
Tour de France	3	DNF	—	—	—

Legend
—	Did not compete
DNF	Did not finish

Awards
Preceded by Kurt Johansson	Svenska Dagbladet Gold Medal; 1967; With: Erik Pettersson, Sture Pettersson and Tomas Pettersson	Succeeded by Toini Gustafsson-Rönnlund
