= Claude Guyot =

French cyclist

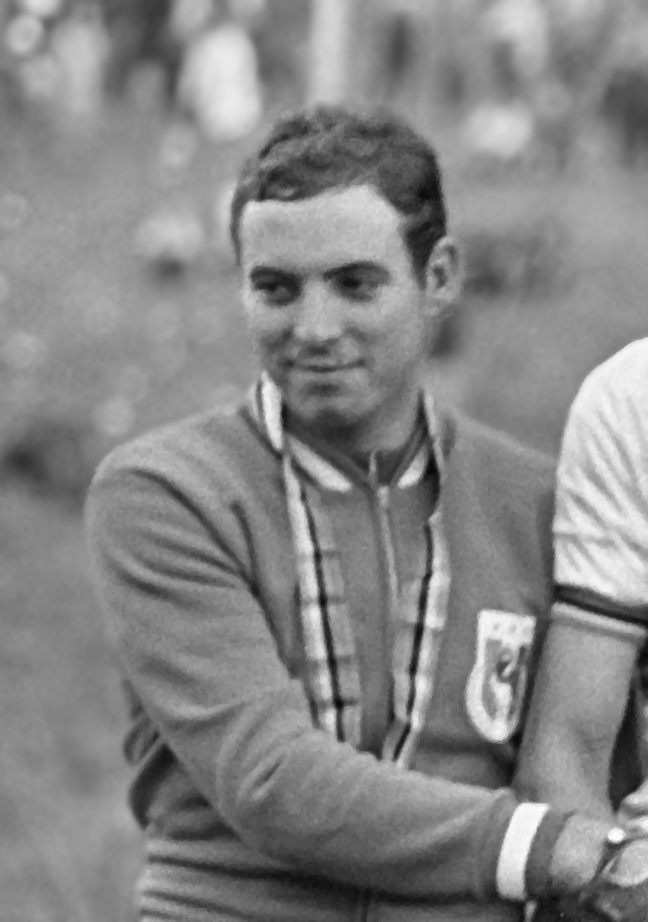
- Claude Guyot in 1967

Personal information
- Born: 16 January 1947 (age 79) Savigny-sur-Orge, France

Cycling career
- Sport: Cycling
Medal record
Representing France
UCI Road World Championships
Silver medal – second place	1967 Heerlen	Amateur's road race

Claude Guyot (French: [klod ɡɥijo]; born 16 January 1947, in Savigny-sur-Orge) is a French retired cyclist. His sporting career began with U.S. Creteil.

Guyot made his debut in 1965, finishing in second place in the one-day race Paris-Troyes. Then he participated three times in the Tour de l'Avenir, where in 1967 he won two stages and finished eleventh overall. The same year he won a silver medal in the amateur road race at the 1967 UCI Road World Championships.

In 1968 he turned professional and won one-day races in Auxerre, Saint-Raphael and Tréguier. Next year he won a one-day race in Pleneut, He then retired from cycling in 1970.

His cousin Fernand Etter and brothers, Bernard Guyot Jr. and Serge Guyot, are also former competitive cyclists.
