= Vittorio Marcelli =

Italian cyclist

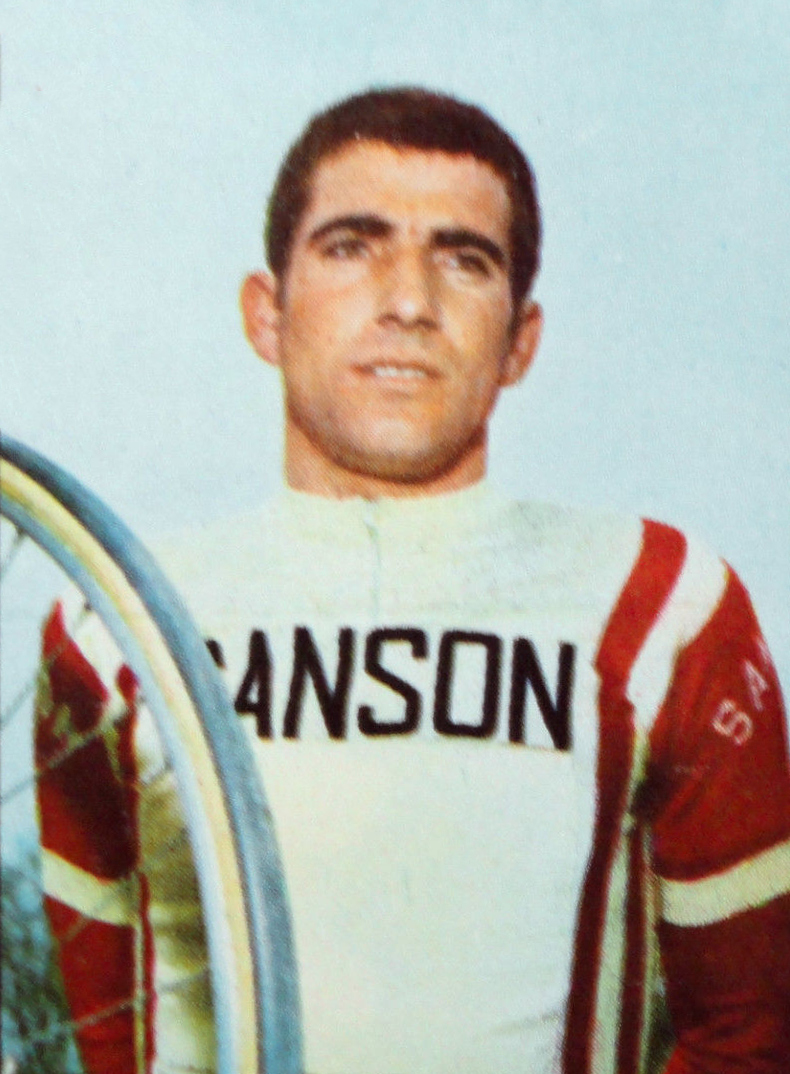
- Marcelli in 1969

Personal information
- Born: 3 June 1944 Magliano de' Marsi, Italy
- Height: 1.85 m (6 ft 1 in)
- Weight: 79 kg (174 lb)

Cycling career
- Sport: Cycling
Medal record
Representing Italy
Summer Olympics
Bronze medal – third place	1968 Mexico City	Team time trial
Road Cycling World Championships
Bronze medal – third place	1967 Heerlen	Team time trial
Gold medal – first place	1968 Imola	Amateurs' road race
Bronze medal – third place	1968 Imola	Team time trial

Vittorio Marcelli (born 3 June 1944) is a former Italian road cyclist. As an amateur he won one gold and three bronze medals at the world championship and Summer Olympic in 1967–68. After that he turned professional and rode the 1970 Tour de France.
