= Trofeo Baracchi =

Race details
- Region: Italy
- English name: Baracchi Trophy
- Discipline: Road
- Competition: UCI Road World Cup (1991)
- Type: Time trial

History
- First edition: 1941
- Editions: 51
- Final edition: 1991
- First winner: Michele Motta (ITA)
- Most wins: Francesco Moser (ITA) (5 times)
- Final winner: Tony Rominger (SUI)

The Trofeo Baracchi was a major Italian cycling race that ran for 50 years. It was created by Giacomo Baracchi, in memory of his father Angelo who was a great cycle racing fan. Originally (from 1941) an amateur individual time trial, from 1944 it was open to professionals and became a major event on the European calendar. Initially it took place every two years but from 1949 it became an annual event and adopted the two person team time trial format. It continued with this formula until 1990. The last running of the event in 1991 reverted to a solo time trial and also held as the Grand Prix des Nations.

== Winners ==
Year	Country	Rider	Team
1941	Italy	Michele Motta	
1942	Italy	Gelsomino Locatelli	
1943	No race		
1944	Italy	Michele Motta	
1945	Italy	Michele Motta	
1946	Italy	Antonio Ausenda	
1947	Italy	Sergio Maggini	
1948	Italy	Giorgio Cargioli	
1949	Italy	Fiorenzo Magni (victory shared with Adolfo Grosso)	
1949	Italy	Adolfo Grosso (victory shared with Fiorenzo Magni)	
1950	Italy	Fiorenzo Magni (victory shared with Antonio Bevilacqua)	
1950	Italy	Antonio Bevilacqua (victory shared with Fiorenzo Magni)	
1951	Italy	Fiorenzo Magni (victory shared with Giuseppe Minardi)	
1951	Italy	Giuseppe Minardi (victory shared with Fiorenzo Magni)	
1952	Italy	Giancarlo Astrua (victory shared with Nino Defilippis)	
1952	Italy	Nino Defilippis (victory shared with Giancarlo Astrua)	
1953	Italy	Fausto Coppi (victory shared with Riccardo Filippi)	
1953	Italy	Riccardo Filippi (victory shared with Fausto Coppi)	
1954	Italy	Fausto Coppi (victory shared with Riccardo Filippi)	
1954	Italy	Riccardo Filippi (victory shared with Fausto Coppi)	
1955	Italy	Fausto Coppi (victory shared with Riccardo Filippi)	
1955	Italy	Riccardo Filippi (victory shared with Fausto Coppi)	
1956	Switzerland	Rolf Graf (victory shared with André Darrigade)	
1956	France	André Darrigade (victory shared with Rolf Graf)	
1957	Italy	Fausto Coppi (victory shared with Ercole Baldini)	
1957	Italy	Ercole Baldini (victory shared with Fausto Coppi)	
1958	Italy	Ercole Baldini (victory shared with Aldo Moser)	
1958	Italy	Aldo Moser (victory shared with Ercole Baldini)	
1959	Italy	Ercole Baldini (victory shared with Aldo Moser)	
1959	Italy	Aldo Moser (victory shared with Ercole Baldini)	
1960	Italy	Diego Ronchini (victory shared with Romeo Venturelli)	
1960	Italy	Romeo Venturelli (victory shared with Diego Ronchini)	
1961	Italy	Ercole Baldini (victory shared with Joseph Velly)	
1961	France	Joseph Velly (victory shared with Ercole Baldini)	
1962	West Germany	Rudi Altig (victory shared with Jacques Anquetil)	
1962	France	Jacques Anquetil (victory shared with Rudi Altig)	
1963	France	Joseph Velly (victory shared with Joseph Novales)	
1963	France	Joseph Novales (victory shared with Joseph Velly)	
1964	Italy	Gianni Motta (victory shared with Giacomo Fornoni)	
1964	Italy	Giacomo Fornoni (victory shared with Gianni Motta)	
1965	France	Jacques Anquetil (victory shared with Jean Stablinski)	
1965	France	Jean Stablinski (victory shared with Jacques Anquetil)	
1966	Belgium	Eddy Merckx (victory shared with Ferdinand Bracke)	
1966	Belgium	Ferdinand Bracke (victory shared with Eddy Merckx)	
1967	Belgium	Eddy Merckx (victory shared with Ferdinand Bracke)	
1967	Belgium	Ferdinand Bracke (victory shared with Eddy Merckx)	
1968	France	Jacques Anquetil (victory shared with Felice Gimondi)	
1968	Italy	Felice Gimondi (victory shared with Jacques Anquetil)	
1969	Belgium	Herman Van Springel (victory shared with Joaquim Agostinho)	
1969	Portugal	Joaquim Agostinho (victory shared with Herman Van Springel)	
1970	Sweden	Gösta Pettersson (victory shared with Tomas Pettersson)	
1970	Sweden	Tomas Pettersson (victory shared with Gösta Pettersson)	
1971	Spain	Luis Ocaña (victory shared with Leif Mortensen)	
1971	Denmark	Leif Mortensen (victory shared with Luis Ocaña)	
1972	Belgium	Eddy Merckx (victory shared with Roger Swerts)	
1972	Belgium	Roger Swerts (victory shared with Eddy Merckx)	
1973	Italy	Felice Gimondi (victory shared with Martín Emilio Rodríguez)	
1973	Colombia	Martín Emilio Rodríguez (victory shared with Felice Gimondi)	
1974	Italy	Francesco Moser (victory shared with Roy Schuiten)	
1974	Netherlands	Roy Schuiten (victory shared with Francesco Moser)	
1975	Italy	Francesco Moser (victory shared with Gianbattista Baronchelli)	
1975	Italy	Gianbattista Baronchelli (victory shared with Francesco Moser)	
1976	Belgium	Freddy Maertens (victory shared with Michel Pollentier)	
1976	Belgium	Michel Pollentier (victory shared with Freddy Maertens)	
1977	Sweden	Bernt Johansson (victory shared with Carmelo Barone)	
1977	Italy	Carmelo Barone (victory shared with Bernt Johansson)	
1978	Netherlands	Roy Schuiten (victory shared with Knut Knudsen)	
1978	Norway	Knut Knudsen (victory shared with Roy Schuiten)	
1979	Italy	Francesco Moser (victory shared with Giuseppe Saronni)	
1979	Italy	Giuseppe Saronni (victory shared with Francesco Moser)	
1980	Belgium	Alfons De Wolf (victory shared with Jean-Luc Vandenbroucke)	
1980	Belgium	Jean-Luc Vandenbroucke (victory shared with Alfons De Wolf)	
1981	Switzerland	Daniel Gisiger (victory shared with Serge Demierre)	
1981	Switzerland	Serge Demierre (victory shared with Daniel Gisiger)	
1982	Switzerland	Daniel Gisiger (victory shared with Roberto Visentini)	
1982	Italy	Roberto Visentini (victory shared with Daniel Gisiger)	
1983	Switzerland	Daniel Gisiger (victory shared with Silvano Contini)	
1983	Italy	Silvano Contini (victory shared with Daniel Gisiger)	
1984	Italy	Francesco Moser (victory shared with Bernard Hinault)	
1984	France	Bernard Hinault (victory shared with Francesco Moser)	
1985	Italy	Francesco Moser (victory shared with Hans-Henrik Ørsted)	
1985	Denmark	Hans-Henrik Ørsted (victory shared with Francesco Moser)	
1986	Italy	Giuseppe Saronni (victory shared with Lech Piasecki)	
1986	Poland	Lech Piasecki (victory shared with Giuseppe Saronni)	
1987	Italy	Bruno Leali (victory shared with Massimo Ghirotto)	
1987	Italy	Massimo Ghirotto (victory shared with Bruno Leali)	
1988	Poland	Czesław Lang (victory shared with Lech Piasecki)	
1988	Poland	Lech Piasecki (victory shared with Czesław Lang)	
1989	France	Laurent Fignon (victory shared with Thierry Marie)	
1989	France	Thierry Marie (victory shared with Laurent Fignon)	
1990	West Germany	Rolf Gölz (victory shared with Tom Cordes)	
1990	Netherlands	Tom Cordes (victory shared with Rolf Gölz)	
1991	Switzerland	Tony Rominger	

== External references ==
- Trofeo Baracchi palmares at Cycling Archives (archived, or current page in French)
