= Jørgen Hansen (cyclist) =

Danish cyclist (born 1942)

Personal information
- Born: 7 December 1942 (age 83) Copenhagen, Denmark

Cycling career
- Sport: Cycling
Medal record
Men's cycling
Representing Denmark
Olympic Games
Bronze medal – third place	1976 Montreal	Team time trial

Jørgen Emil Hansen (born 7 December 1942) is a Danish cyclist who competed in the Summer Olympics three times. He took part in the men's 100 km team time trial in the 1968, 1972, and 1976 Olympic Games, and in the men's individual road race in 1968 and 1976. The 1976 100 km time trial team, which also included Verner Blaudzun, Gert Frank and Jørn Lund, won a bronze medal for Denmark. It finished ahead of West Germany and Czechoslovakia for third place, behind the Soviet Union and Poland.

Born in Copenhagen, Hansen won a gold medal in the men's team time trial at the 1966 UCI Road World Championships. Later, he earned silver medals in the event in 1967 and 1969. In 2015, Hansen won an age group gold medal in the World Masters Road Race.
