= Svenska Dagbladet Gold Medal =

Swedish newspaper sports award

- Date: 1925-
- Country: Sweden
- Presented by: Svenska Dagbladet

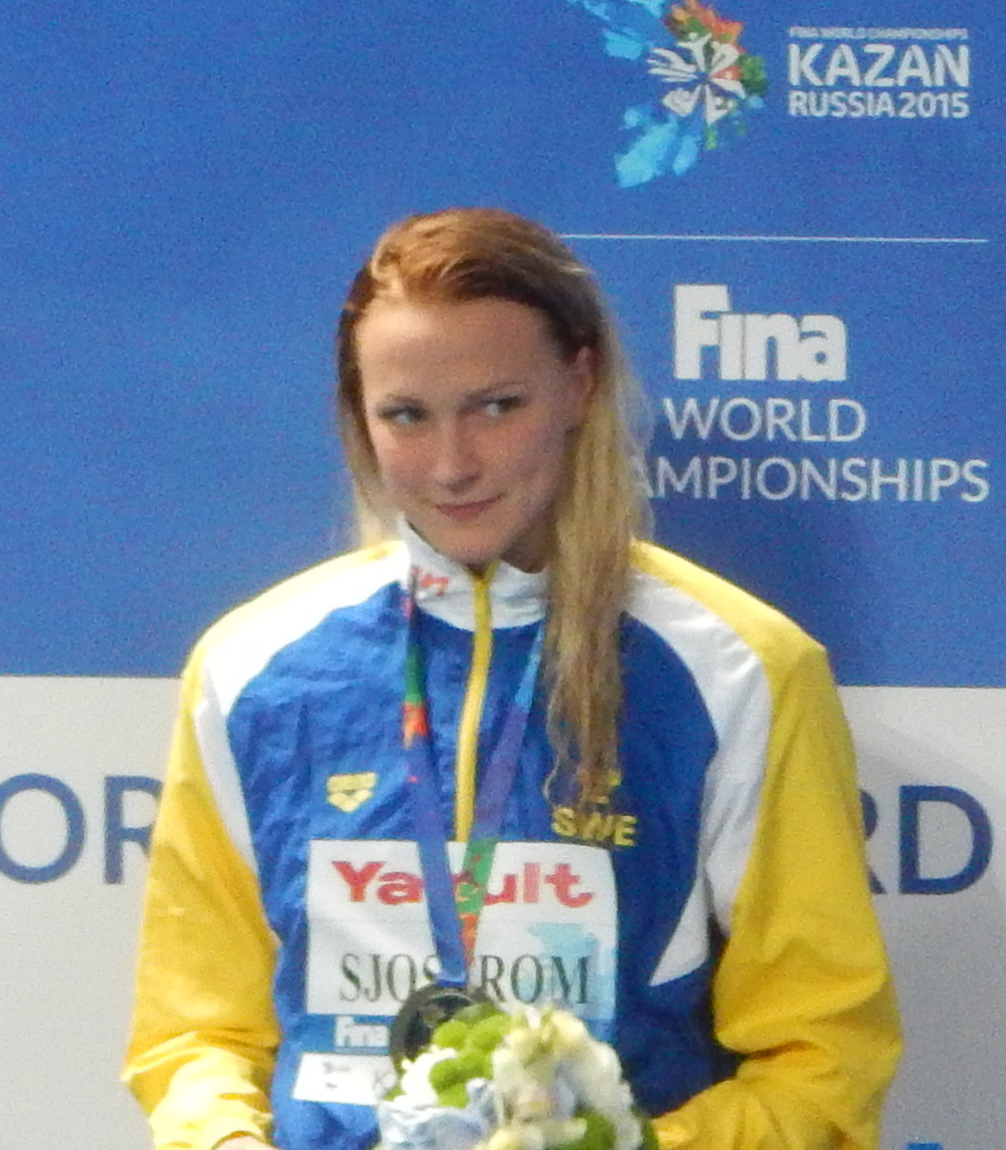
Sarah Sjöström holding the World Record Award at the 2015 World Championships in Kazan

The Svenska Dagbladet Gold Medal (Swedish: Svenska Dagbladets guldmedalj, but usually simply called Bragdguldet, "The Feat Gold") is an annual award "for the most significant Swedish sports achievement of the year". It has been awarded by a jury led by the Swedish morning paper Svenska Dagbladet since 1925. According to its statutes the Medal may be awarded in November or December to either an individual sportsperson or a team. An individual can be awarded the Medal no more than twice, and to receive a second medal, that athlete must be "regarded a class of his own".

== List of gold medalists ==
=== 1920s ===
- 1925 - Sten Pettersson, athletics
- 1926 - Arne Borg, swimming, and Edvin Wide, athletics
- 1927 - Sven Salén, sailing
- 1928 - Per-Erik Hedlund, cross-country skiing
- 1929 - Gillis Grafström, figure skating, and Sven Utterström, cross-country skiing

=== 1930s ===
- 1930 - Johan Richthoff, wrestling
- 1931 - Sven Rydell, football
- 1932 - Ivar Johansson, wrestling
- 1933 - Sven "Sleven" Säfwenberg, bandy
- 1934 - Harald Andersson, athletics
- 1935 - Hans Drakenberg, fencing
- 1936 - Erik August Larsson, cross-country skiing
- 1937 - Torsten Ullman, shooting
- 1938 - Björn Borg, swimming
- 1939 - Sven Selånger, ski jumping and Nordic combined

=== 1940s ===
- 1940 - Henry Kälarne, athletics, and Håkan Lidman, athletics
- 1941 - Alfred Dahlqvist, cross-country skiing
- 1942 - Gunder Hägg, athletics
- 1943 - Arne Andersson, athletics
- 1944 - Nils 'Mora-Nisse' Karlsson, cross-country skiing
- 1945 - Claes Egnell, modern pentathlon
- 1946 - Arvid Andersson, weightlifting
- 1947 - Gösta Frändfors, wrestling
- 1948 - William Grut, modern pentathlon
- 1949 - Gert Fredriksson, canoeing

=== 1950s ===
- 1950 - Lennart Bergelin, tennis
- 1951 - Rune Larsson, athletics
- 1952 - Valter Nyström, athletics
- 1953 - Bertil Antonsson, wrestling
- 1954 - Bengt Nilsson, athletics
- 1955 - Sigvard Ericsson, speed skating
- 1956 - Lars Hall, modern pentathlon, and Sixten Jernberg, cross-country skiing
- 1957 - Dan Waern, athletics
- 1958 - Richard Dahl, athletics
- 1959 - Agne Simonsson, football

=== 1960s ===
- 1960 - Jane Cederqvist, swimming
- 1961 - Ove Fundin, motorcycle speedway, and Sten Lundin, motocross
- 1962 - Assar Rönnlund, cross-country skiing
- 1963 - Jonny Nilsson, speed skating
- 1964 - Rolf Peterson, canoeing
- 1965 - Kjell Johansson, table tennis
- 1966 - Kurt Johansson, shooting
- 1967 - The Fåglum brothers (Erik Pettersson, Gösta Pettersson, Sture Pettersson and Tomas Pettersson), cycling
- 1968 - Toini Gustafsson-Rönnlund, cross-country skiing
- 1969 - Ove Kindvall, football

=== 1970s ===
- 1970 - Gunnar Larsson, swimming
- 1971 - Stellan Bengtsson, table tennis
- 1972 - Ulrika Knape, diving
- 1973 - Rolf Edling, fencing
- 1974 - Björn Borg, tennis
- 1975 - Ingemar Stenmark, alpine skiing
- 1976 - Anders Gärderud, athletics, and Bernt Johansson, cycling
- 1977 - Frank Andersson, wrestling
- 1978 - Björn Borg, tennis, and Ingemar Stenmark, alpine skiing
- 1979 - Malmö FF, football

=== 1980s ===
- 1980 - Thomas Wassberg, cross-country skiing (originally refused to accept the medal, but eventually accepted the medal in early December 2013)
- 1981 - Annichen Kringstad, orienteering
- 1982 - Mats Wilander, tennis
- 1983 - Håkan Carlqvist, motocross
- 1984 - Gunde Svan, cross-country skiing
- 1985 - Patrik Sjöberg, athletics
- 1986 - Tomas Johansson, wrestling
- 1987 - Sweden men's national ice hockey team, ice hockey, and Marie-Helene Westin, cross-country skiing
- 1988 - Tomas Gustafson, speed skating
- 1989 - Sweden men's national table tennis team, table tennis (Jan-Ove Waldner, Mikael Appelgren, Jörgen Persson, Erik Lindh and Peter Karlsson)

=== 1990s ===
- 1990 - Stefan Edberg, tennis
- 1991 - Pernilla Wiberg, alpine skiing
- 1992 - Jan-Ove Waldner, table tennis
- 1993 - Torgny Mogren, cross-country skiing
- 1994 - Sweden men's national football team, football
- 1995 - Annika Sörenstam, golf
- 1996 - Agneta Andersson and Susanne Gunnarsson, canoeing
- 1997 - Ludmila Engquist, athletics
- 1998 - Sweden men's national handball team, handball
- 1999 - Tony Rickardsson, motorcycle speedway

=== 2000s ===
- 2000 - Lars Frölander, swimming
- 2001 - Per Elofsson, cross-country skiing
- 2002 - Susanne Ljungskog, cycling
- 2003 - Carolina Klüft, athletics
- 2004 - Stefan Holm, athletics
- 2005 - Kajsa Bergqvist, athletics
- 2006 - Anja Pärson, alpine skiing
- 2007 - Anja Pärson, alpine skiing
- 2008 - Jonas Jacobsson, shooting
- 2009 - Helena Jonsson, biathlon

=== 2010s ===
- 2010 - Swedish men's Olympic 4 × 10 km relay team (Daniel Rickardsson, Johan Olsson, Anders Södergren, Marcus Hellner), cross-country skiing
- 2011 - Therese Alshammar, swimming
- 2012 - Lisa Nordén, triathlon
- 2013 - Johan Olsson, cross-country skiing
- 2014 - Swedish women's Olympic 4 × 5 km relay team (Ida Ingemarsdotter, Emma Wikén, Anna Haag, Charlotte Kalla), cross-country skiing
- 2015 - Sarah Sjöström, swimming
- 2016 - Henrik Stenson, golf
- 2017 - Sarah Sjöström, swimming
- 2018 - Hanna Öberg, biathlon
- 2019 - Tove Alexandersson, orienteering

=== 2020s ===
- 2020 - Armand Duplantis, athletics
- 2021 - Team Sweden (Malin Baryard-Johnsson, Henrik von Eckermann and Peder Fredricson), show jumping
- 2022 - Nils van der Poel, speed skating
- 2023 - Daniel Ståhl, athletics
- 2024 - Armand Duplantis, athletics
- 2025 - David Åhman and Jonatan Hellvig, beach volleyball

== See also ==
- Jerring Award, established by the sport section of Sveriges Radio where the radio audience votes on the Swedish athlete or team that has made the best sport performance of the year
