= Anna Konkina =

Russian cyclist

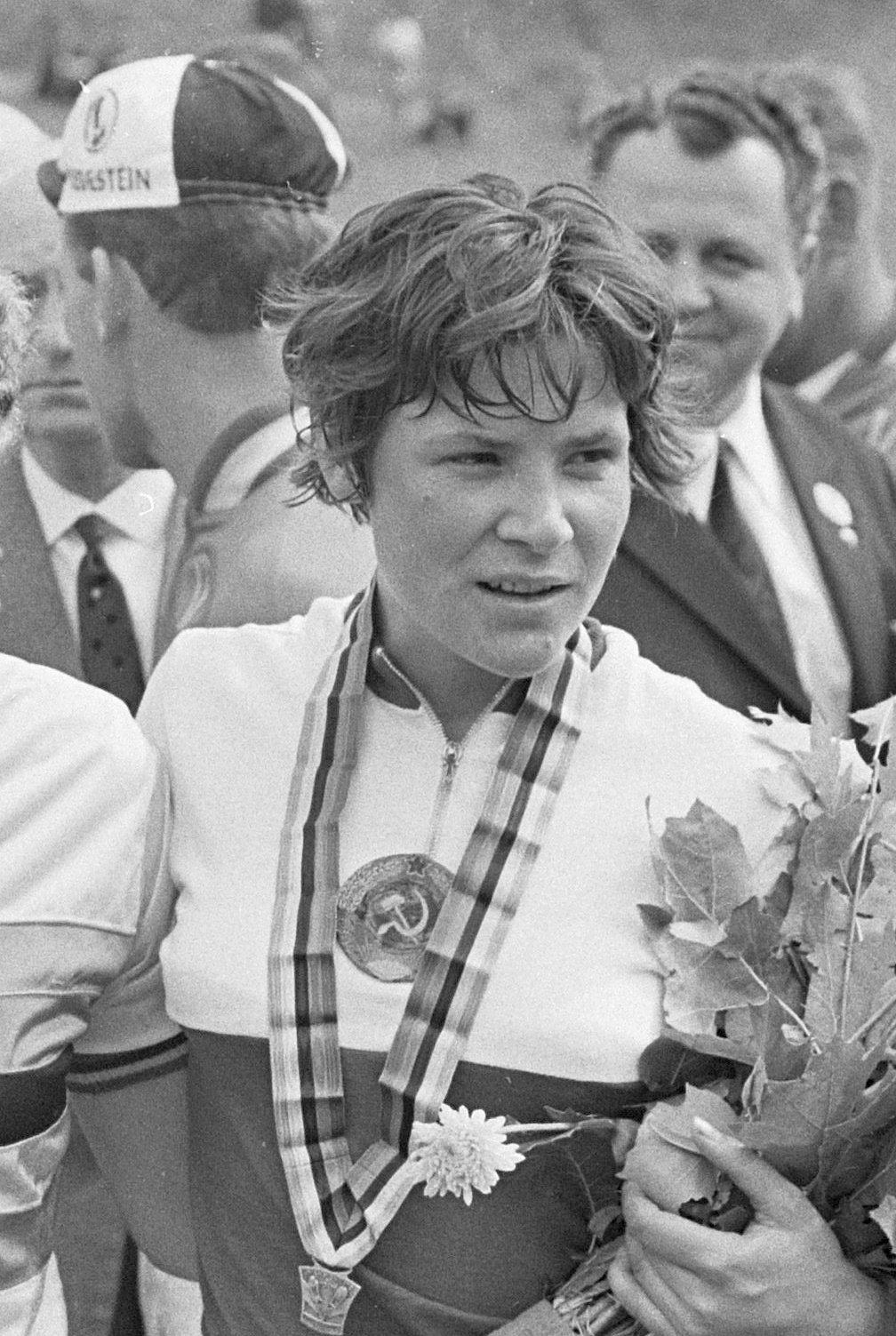
- Anna Konkina in 1967

Personal information
- Born: 14 July 1947 (age 78) Kirillovka, Penza Oblast, Russian SFSR

Sport
- Sport: Cycling
Medal record
Representing the Soviet Union
UCI Road World Championships
| Bronze medal – third place | 1967 Heerlen | Road race |
| Gold medal – first place | 1970 Leicester | Road race |
| Gold medal – first place | 1971 Mendrisio | Road race |
| Bronze medal – third place | 1972 Gap | Road race |

Anna Konkina (born 14 July 1947 in Kirillovka, Penza Oblast) is a Russian retired cyclist. She won the UCI Road World Championships in 1970 and 1971 and finished in third place in 1967 and 1972.
