= 1971 Tour de Romandie =

Race details
- Dates: 4–9 May 1971
- Stages: 5 + Prologue
- Distance: 982.3 km (610.4 mi)
- Winning time: 24h 20' 37"

Results
	Winner	Gianni Motta (ITA)
	Second	Antonio Salutini (ITA)
	Third	Willy Van Neste (BEL)

The 1971 Tour de Romandie was the 25th edition of the Tour de Romandie cycle race and was held from 4 May to 9 May 1971. The race started in Geneva and finished in Lugano. The race was won by Gianni Motta.

== General classification ==
Final general classification
Rank	Rider	Time
1	Gianni Motta (ITA)	24h 20' 37"
2	Antonio Salutini (ITA)	+ 50"
3	Willy Van Neste (BEL)	+ 50"
4	Guerrino Tosello (ITA)	+ 1' 30"
5	Erik Pettersson (SWE)	+ 1' 40"
5	Francis Ducreux (FRA)	+ 1' 40"
5	Wladimiro Panizza (ITA)	+ 1' 40"
5	Gilbert Bellone (FRA)	+ 1' 40"
9	Italo Zilioli (ITA)	+ 2' 12"
9	Aldo Moser (ITA)	+ 2' 12"
