= Lyubov Zadorozhnaya =

Soviet competitive cyclist

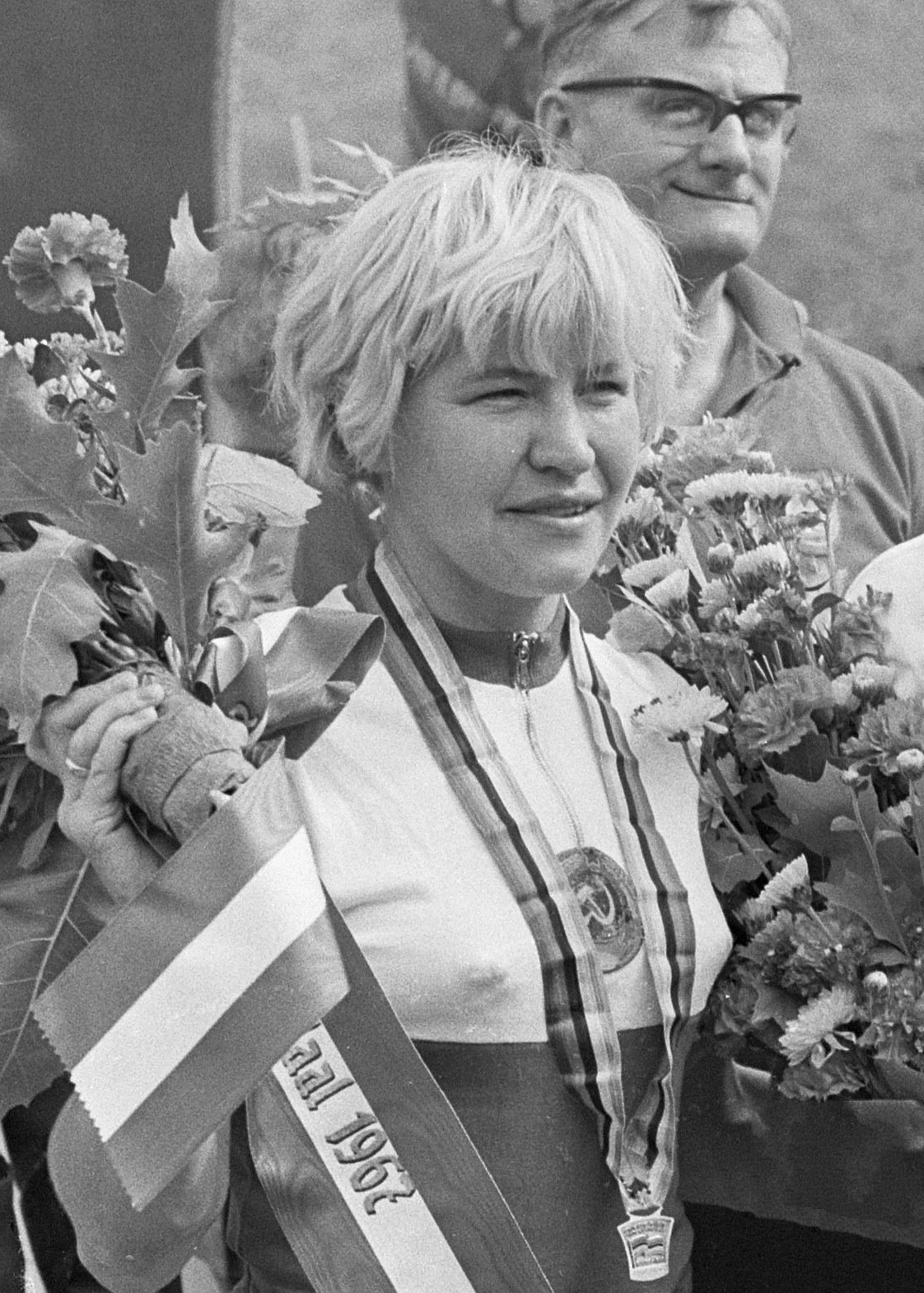
- Lyubov Zadorozhnaya in 1967

Personal information
- Born: 3 November 1942 (age 83) Vysokogorsky District, Tatarstan, Russian SFSR

Sport
- Sport: Cycling
Medal record
Representing the Soviet Union
UCI Road World Championships
Silver medal – second place	1967 Heerlen	Road race
Silver medal – second place	1972 Gap	Road race
UCI Track Cycling World Championships
Bronze medal – third place	1972 Marseille	Individual pursuit

Lubov Vasilievna Zadorozhnaya (Russian: Любовь Васильевна Задорожная; born 3 November 1942) is a retired Soviet cyclist. She won two silver medals at the UCI Road World Championships in 1967 and 1972, as well as a bronze medal at the UCI Track Cycling World Championships in 1972. During her career she won 15 national titles.
