= Baiba Caune =

Latvian cyclist (1945–2014)

Personal information
- Full name: Baiba Caune-Morzika
- Born: 12 August 1945 Stāmeriena Parish, Latvia
- Died: 7 February 2014

Cycling career
- Sport: Cycling
- Disciplines: Road, Track
- Role: Rider
Medal record
Representing Soviet Union
Women's road cycling
World Championships
Silver medal – second place	1974 Montreal	Road race
Silver medal – second place	1968 Imola	Road race

Baiba Caune-Morzika (née Baiba Ābere; 12 August 1945 – 7 February 2014) was a Latvian track and road racing cyclist. She won the silver medal at the UCI Road World Championships in the women's road race in 1968 and 1974 representing USSR. She was a member of the sports club Marss, winning 55 Latvian national championships and two USSR championships.

== Early life ==
Caune was born Baiba Ābere on 12 August 1945, in Stāmeriena parish, Latvia. During the Soviet mass deportation in 1949, Caune and her mother were deported to Parabelsky District in Tomsk Oblast, Russia, and returned to Latvia in 1955. She began cycling in the Irlava Secondary School. Soon she became a winner of numerous area school competitions, and received 4th Place at the Latvian SSR Spartakiad of Students.

== Cycling career ==
In 1961 Caune began her early training as a cyclist at Tukums Sports School, under the direction of coach Uldis Mauriņš, and later she was trained by Ilmārs Janovs at Riga Central Cycling Club (CRK). In 1964 she passed the qualification test in track and road race. Since then she obtained 55 national championships, won the title of USSR Youth Championship in track, two USSR championships (1968 and 1969) and two silver medals at the UCI Road World Championships (1968 and 1974).

Caune worked as cycling coach at Salaspils Sports School from 1980 to 1997. During this time she trained ten professional women cyclists and three of them won the title of USSR Youth Championship (Ilona Krišāne, Elita Ivbulete and her daughter Dace Caune). In 1996 her student Māris Kalveršs joined the Latvian Olympic team and was prepared to compete at the 1996 Summer Olympics in Atlanta.
