= Robert Thalmann =

Swiss cyclist

Personal information
- Born: 1 February 1949 Menznau, Switzerland
- Died: 23 May 2017 (aged 68) Italy

Cycling career
- Sport: Cycling

Robert Thalmann (1 February 1949 – 23 May 2017) was a Swiss cyclist. He competed in the individual road race event at the 1976 Summer Olympics.
