= UCI Road World Championships – Women's road race =

Women's road race
- Rainbow jersey

Race details
- Date: End of season
- Discipline: One-day road race
- Organiser: UCI

History
- First edition: 1958
- Editions: 66 (as of 2026)
- Most wins: Jeannie Longo (FRA) (5 wins)
- Most recent: Demi Vollering (NLD)

The UCI Road World Championships Elite Women's Road Race is a one-day event for professional cyclists that takes place annually, organised by the Union Cycliste Internationale (UCI). The winner is considered the World Cycling Champion (or World Road Cycling Champion) and earns the right to wear the Rainbow Jersey for a full year in road race or stage events. The event is a single 'mass start' road race with the winner being the first across the line at the completion of the full race distance. The road race is contested by riders organized by national cycling teams as opposed to commercially sponsored or trade teams, which is the standard in professional cycling.

== History ==
The UCI Road World Championships for women made its debut in Reims, France in 1958. Due to the Summer Olympics, the Road World Championships were not held in 1984, 1988 and 1992.

Until about 1990, the race varied in length from a low of 46.6 km in 1966 to around 72 km (30 to 50 miles). From 1991, the race length began to gradually increase, first to 79 km (Stuttgart, Germany), and then to over 100 km in 1996 (Lugano, Switzerland). Between 2010 and 2024, the course varied in length between 130 kilometres (81 mi) and 160 kilometres (99 mi). From 2025, the UCI increased the maximum distance of the road race to 180 kilometres (110 mi).

The event can be held over either a relatively flat course which favors cycling sprinters or over a hilly course which favors more of a climbing specialist or all-round type of cyclist. It usually involves laps of a circuit, albeit with fewer laps than the Elite Men's race. Historically, European nations have dominated this event.

From 2022 to 2024, competitors in this race under the age of 23 at the end of the previous year were also competing for honours in their own classification.

== Results ==
Women road race medallists
Year	Gold	Silver	Bronze
1958	Elsy Jacobs (LUX)	Tamara Novikova (URS)	Mariya Loukchina (URS)
1959	Yvonne Reynders (BEL)	Aino Puronen (URS)	Vera Gorbatcheva (URS)
1960	Beryl Burton (GBR)	Rosa Sels (BEL)	Elisabeth Kleinhaus (GDR)
1961	Yvonne Reynders (BEL)	Beryl Burton (GBR)	Elsy Jacobs (LUX)
1962	Marie-Rose Gaillard (BEL)	Yvonne Reynders (BEL)	Marie-Therese Naessens (BEL)
1963	Yvonne Reynders (BEL)	Rosa Sels (BEL)	Aino Puronen (URS)
1964	Emīlija Sonka (URS)	Galina Yudina (URS)	Rosa Sels (BEL)
1965	Elisabeth Eicholz (GDR)	Yvonne Reynders (BEL)	Aino Puronen (URS)
1966	Yvonne Reynders (BEL)	Keetie van Oosten-Hage (NED)	Aino Puronen (URS)
1967	Beryl Burton (GBR)	Lyubov Zadorojnala (URS)	Anna Konkina (URS)
1968	Keetie van Oosten-Hage (NED)	Baiba Caune (URS)	Morena Tartagni (ITA)
1969	Audrey McElmury (USA)	Bernadette Swinnerton (GBR)	Nina Trofimova (URS)
1970	Anna Konkina (URS)	Morena Tartagni (ITA)	Raisa Obodovskaia (URS)
1971	Anna Konkina (URS)	Morena Tartagni (ITA)	Keetie van Oosten-Hage (NED)
1972	Geneviève Gambillon (FRA)	Lyubov Zadorojnala (URS)	Anna Konkina (URS)
1973	Nicole Vandenbroeck (BEL)	Keetie van Oosten-Hage (NED)	Valentina Rebrovskala (URS)
1974	Geneviève Gambillon (FRA)	Baiba Caune (URS)	Keetie van Oosten-Hage (NED)
1975	Tineke Fopma (NED)	Geneviève Gambillon (FRA)	Keetie van Oosten-Hage (NED)
1976	Keetie van Oosten-Hage (NED)	Laura Bissoli (ITA)	Yvonne Reynders (BEL)
1977	Josiane Bost (FRA)	Connie Carpenter (USA)	Minnie Brinkhof (NED)
1978	Beate Habetz (FRG)	Keetie van Oosten-Hage (NED)	Eva Lorenzo (ITA)
1979	Petra de Bruijn (NED)	Jen De Smet (BEL)	Beate Habetz (FRG)
1980	Beth Heiden (USA)	Tuulikki Jahre (SWE)	Mandy Jones (GBR)
1981	Ute Enzenauer (FRG)	Jeannie Longo (FRA)	Connie Carpenter (USA)
1982	Mandy Jones (GBR)	Maria Canins (ITA)	Gerda Sierens (BEL)
1983	Marianne Berglund (SWE)	Rebecca Twigg (USA)	Maria Canins (ITA)
1984	No race		
1985	Jeannie Longo (FRA)	Maria Canins (ITA)	Sandra Schumacher (FRG)
1986	Jeannie Longo (FRA)	Janelle Parks (USA)	Alla Jakovleva (URS)
1987	Jeannie Longo (FRA)	Heleen Hage (NED)	Connie Meyer (NED)
1988	No race		
1989	Jeannie Longo (FRA)	Catherine Marsal (FRA)	Maria Canins (ITA)
1990	Catherine Marsal (FRA)	Ruthie Matthes (USA)	Luisa Seghezzi (ITA)
1991	Leontien van Moorsel (NED)	Inga Thompson (USA)	Alison Sydor (CAN)
1992	No race		
1993	Leontien van Moorsel (NED)	Jeannie Longo (FRA)	Laura Charameda (USA)
1994	Monica Valvik (NOR)	Patsy Maegerman (BEL)	Jeanne Golay (USA)
1995	Jeannie Longo (FRA)	Catherine Marsal (FRA)	Edita Pučinskaitė (LTU)
1996	Barbara Heeb (SUI)	Rasa Polikevičiūtė (LTU)	Linda Jackson (CAN)
1997	Alessandra Cappellotto (ITA)	Elizabeth Tadich (AUS)	Catherine Marsal (FRA)
1998	Diana Žiliūtė (LTU)	Leontien van Moorsel (NED)	Hanka Kupfernagel (GER)
1999	Edita Pučinskaitė (LTU)	Anna Wilson (AUS)	Diana Žiliūtė (LTU)
2000	Zinaida Stahurskaia (BLR)	Chantal Beltman (NED)	Madeleine Lindberg (SWE)
2001	Rasa Polikevičiūtė (LTU)	Edita Pučinskaitė (LTU)	Jeannie Longo (FRA)
2002	Susanne Ljungskog (SWE)	Nicole Brändli (SUI)	Joane Somarriba (ESP)
2003	Susanne Ljungskog (SWE)	Mirjam Melchers (NED)	Nicole Cooke (GBR)
2004	Judith Arndt (GER)	Tatiana Guderzo (ITA)	Anita Valen (NOR)
2005	Regina Schleicher (GER)	Nicole Cooke (GBR)	Oenone Wood (AUS)
2006	Marianne Vos (NED)	Trixi Worrack (GER)	Nicole Cooke (GBR)
2007	Marta Bastianelli (ITA)	Marianne Vos (NED)	Giorgia Bronzini (ITA)
2008	Nicole Cooke (GBR)	Marianne Vos (NED)	Judith Arndt (GER)
2009	Tatiana Guderzo (ITA)	Marianne Vos (NED)	Noemi Cantele (ITA)
2010	Giorgia Bronzini (ITA)	Marianne Vos (NED)	Emma Johansson (SWE)
2011	Giorgia Bronzini (ITA)	Marianne Vos (NED)	Ina-Yoko Teutenberg (GER)
2012	Marianne Vos (NED)	Rachel Neylan (AUS)	Elisa Longo Borghini (ITA)
2013	Marianne Vos (NED)	Emma Johansson (SWE)	Rossella Ratto (ITA)
2014	Pauline Ferrand-Prévot (FRA)	Lisa Brennauer (GER)	Emma Johansson (SWE)
2015	Lizzie Armitstead (GBR)	Anna van der Breggen (NED)	Megan Guarnier (USA)
2016	Amalie Dideriksen (DEN)	Kirsten Wild (NED)	Lotta Lepistö (FIN)
2017	Chantal Blaak (NED)	Katrin Garfoot (AUS)	Amalie Dideriksen (DEN)
2018	Anna van der Breggen (NED)	Amanda Spratt (AUS)	Tatiana Guderzo (ITA)
2019	Annemiek van Vleuten (NED)	Anna van der Breggen (NED)	Amanda Spratt (AUS)
2020	Anna van der Breggen (NED)	Annemiek van Vleuten (NED)	Elisa Longo Borghini (ITA)
2021	Elisa Balsamo (ITA)	Marianne Vos (NED)	Katarzyna Niewiadoma (POL)
2022	Annemiek van Vleuten (NED)	Lotte Kopecky (BEL)	Silvia Persico (ITA)
2023	Lotte Kopecky (BEL)	Demi Vollering (NED)	Cecilie Uttrup Ludwig (DEN)
2024	Lotte Kopecky (BEL)	Chloe Dygert (USA)	Elisa Longo Borghini (ITA)
2025	Magdeleine Vallieres (CAN)	Niamh Fisher-Black (NZL)	Mavi Garcia (ESP)
2026	Demi Vollering (NLD)	Kasia Niewiadoma-Phinney (POL)	Elisa Longo Borghini (ITA)

=== Most successful riders ===
Updated after the 2025 UCI Road World Championships

Rank	Name and country	Gold	Silver	Bronze	Total	Winning years
1	Jeannie Longo (FRA)	5	2	1	8	1985, 1986, 1987, 1989, 1995
2	Yvonne Reynders (BEL)	4	2	1	7	1959, 1961, 1963, 1966
3	Marianne Vos (NED)	3	6	0	9	2006, 2012, 2013
4	Keetie van Oosten-Hage (NED)	2	3	3	8	1968, 1976
5	Anna van der Breggen (NED)	2	2	0	4	2018, 2020
6	Beryl Burton (GBR)	2	1	0	3	1960, 1967
6	Geneviève Gambillon (FRA)	2	1	0	3	1972, 1974
6	Leontien van Moorsel (NED)	2	1	0	3	1991, 1993
6	Annemiek van Vleuten (NED)	2	1	0	3	2019, 2022
6	Lotte Kopecky (BEL)	2	1	0	3	2023, 2024
11	Anna Konkina (URS)	2	0	2	4	1970, 1971
12	Giorgia Bronzini (ITA)	2	0	1	3	2010, 2011

=== Medalists per nation ===
Updated after the 2026 UCI Road World Championships

Rank	Nation	Gold	Silver	Bronze	Total
1	Netherlands (NED)	15	18	5	38
2	France (FRA)	10	5	2	17
3	Belgium (BEL)	8	7	4	19
4	Italy (ITA)	6	6	14	26
5	Great Britain (GBR)	5	3	3	11
6	Germany (GER)	4	2	5	11
7	Soviet Union (URS)	3	7	11	21
8	Sweden (SWE)	3	2	3	8
9	Lithuania (LTU)	3	2	2	7
10	United States (USA)	2	6	4	12
11	Switzerland (SUI)	1	1	0	2
12	Canada (CAN)	1	0	2	3
12	Denmark (DEN)	1	0	2	3
14	East Germany (GDR)	1	0	1	2
14	Luxembourg (LUX)	1	0	1	2
14	Norway (NOR)	1	0	1	2
17	Belarus (BLR)	1	0	0	1
18	Australia (AUS)	0	5	2	7
19	Poland (POL)	0	1	1	2
20	New Zealand (NZL)	0	1	0	1
21	Spain (ESP)	0	0	2	2
22	Finland (FIN)	0	0	1	1
Totals (22 entries)		66	66	66	198
