= Bruno Hubschmid =

Swiss cyclist

Personal information
- Born: 7 March 1950 (age 76) Hedingen, Switzerland
- Height: 183 cm (6 ft 0 in)
- Weight: 77 kg (170 lb)

Cycling career
- Sport: Cycling

Bruno Hubschmid (born 7 March 1950) is a Swiss former cyclist. He competed at the 1968 Summer Olympics and the 1972 Summer Olympics.

== Notes ==
- Miroir du cyclisme, n°201, June 1975.
