= Vårgårda =

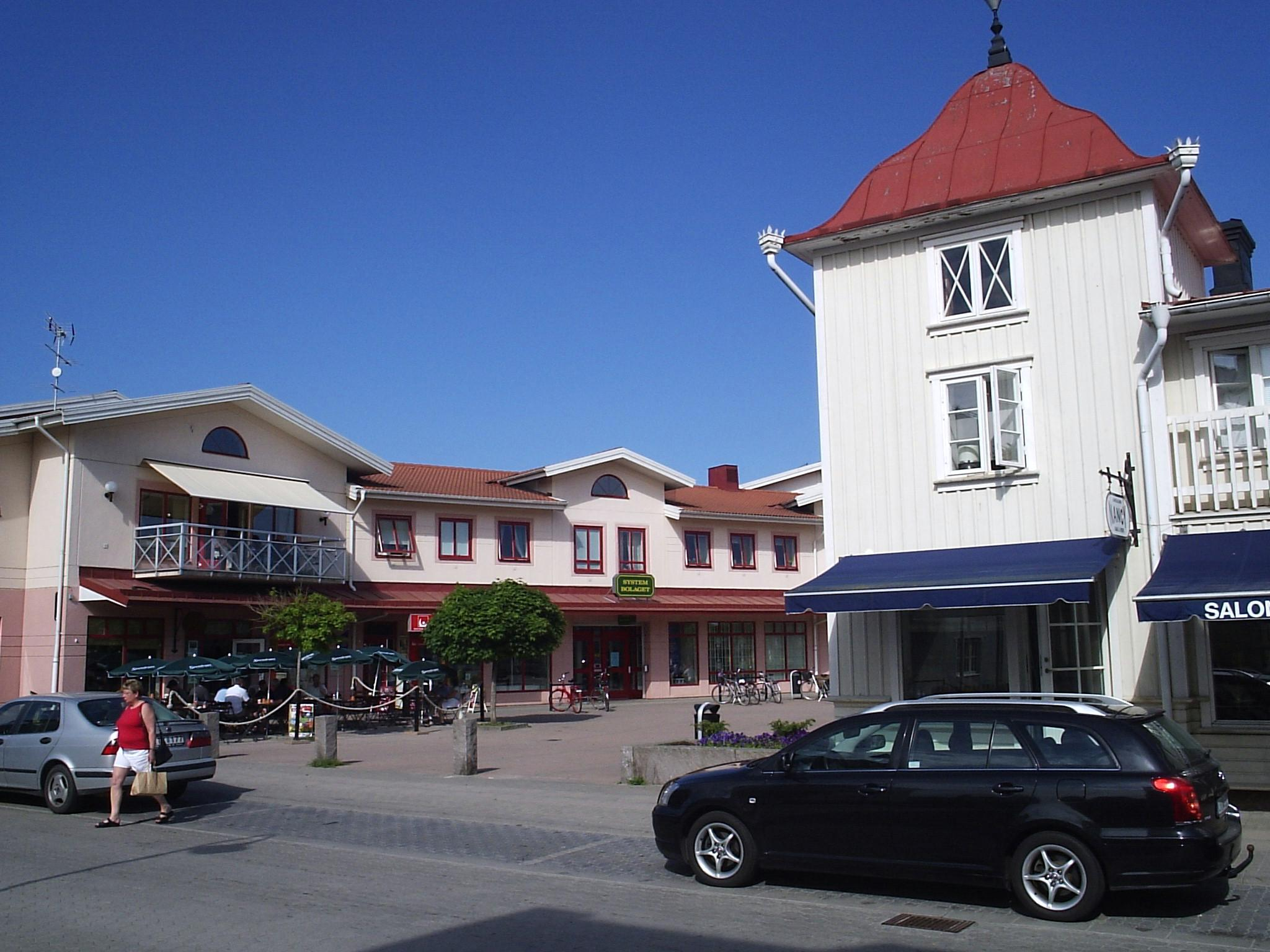
- Vårgårda

- Location within Västra Götaland Location within Sweden
- Coordinates: 58°02′N 12°48′E
- Country: Sweden
- Province: Västergötland
- County: Västra Götaland County
- Municipality: Vårgårda Municipality

Area
  - Total: 4.31 km^{2} (1.66 sq mi)

Population (31 December 2010)
  - Total: 5,340
  - Density: 1,192/km^{2} (3,090/sq mi)
- Time zone: UTC+1 (CET)
  - Summer (DST): UTC+2 (CEST)

Vårgårda is a locality and the seat of Vårgårda Municipality, Västra Götaland County, Sweden with 5,825 inhabitants in 2020.

== Gallery ==
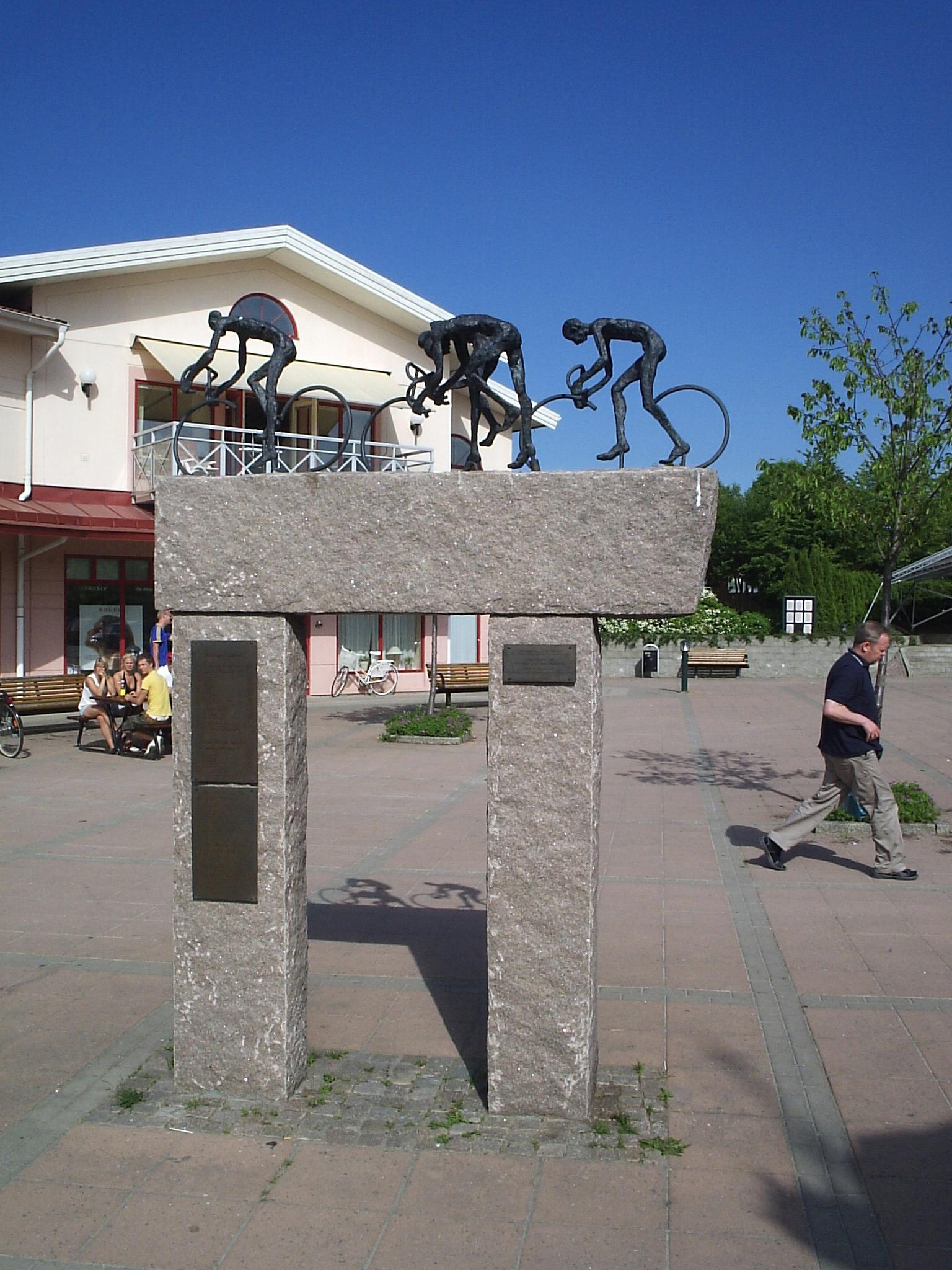
Fåglum brothers in Vårgårda.
