= 1972 Tour de France, Prologue to Stage 10 =

Cycling race stages

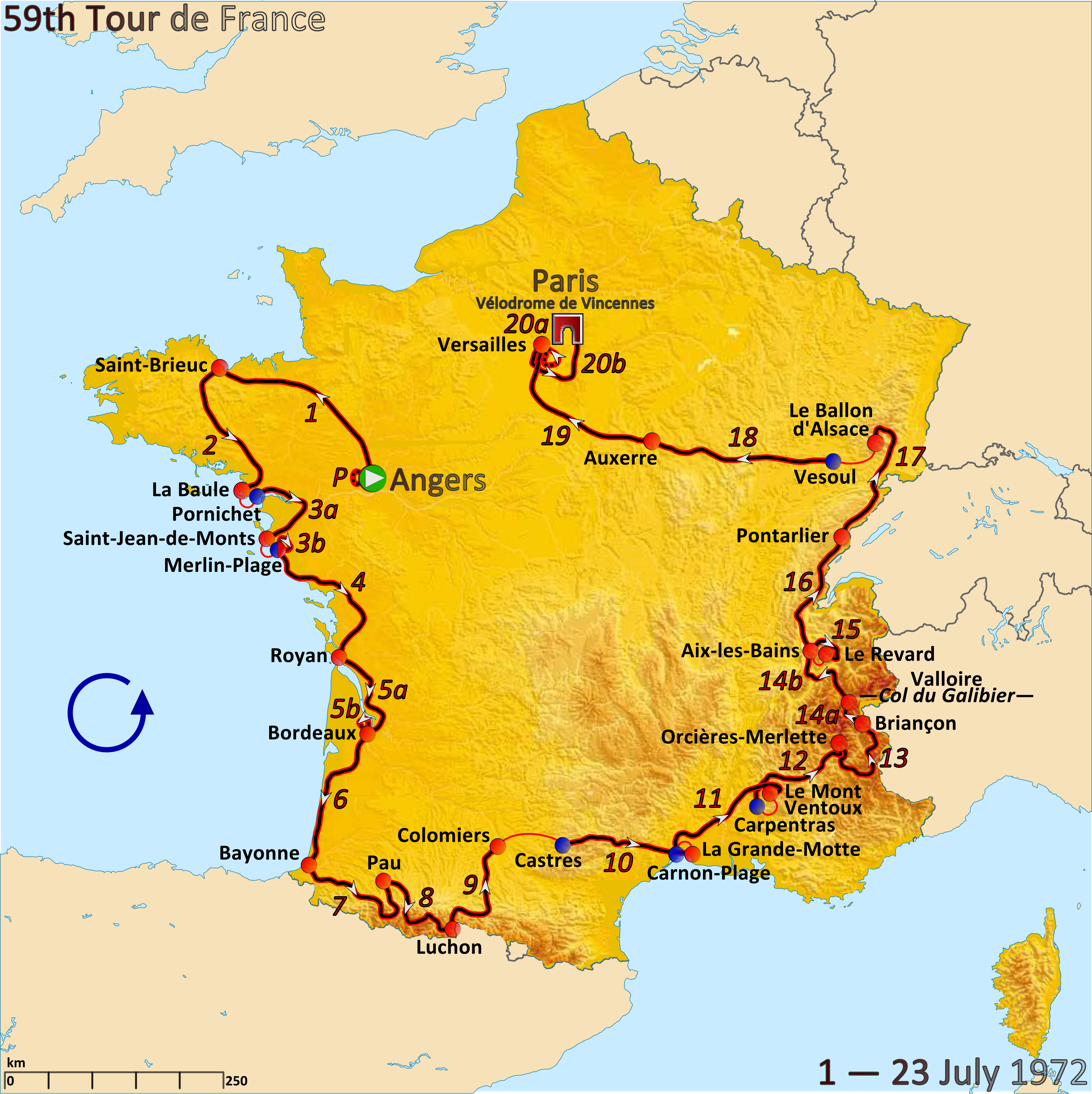
Route of the 1972 Tour de France

The 1972 Tour de France was the 59th edition of Tour de France, one of cycling's Grand Tours. The Tour began in Angers with a prologue individual time trial on 1 July and Stage 10 occurred on 12 July with a flat stage to La Grande-Motte. The race finished in Paris on 23 July.

== Prologue ==
1 July 1972 - Angers, 7.2 km (4.5 mi) (ITT)

Prologue result and General Classification after Prologue

	Rider	Team	Time
1	Eddy Merckx (BEL)	Molteni	8' 51.21"
2	Roger Swerts (BEL)	Molteni	+ 11"
3	Raymond Poulidor (FRA)	Gan–Mercier–Hutchinson	+ 12"
4	Joop Zoetemelk (NED)	Beaulieu–Flandria	+ 13"
5	Leo Duyndam (NED)	Goudsmit–Hoff	+ 15"
6	Luis Ocaña (ESP)	Bic	s.t.
7	Leif Mortensen (DEN)	Bic	+ 17"
8	Cyrille Guimard (FRA)	Gan–Mercier–Hutchinson	+ 19"
9	Gilbert Bellone (FRA)	Rokado–Colders	+ 20"
10	Yves Hézard (FRA)	Sonolor–Lejeune	+ 21"

== Stage 1 ==
2 July 1972 - Angers to Saint-Brieuc, 235.5 km (146.3 mi)

Stage 1 result

Rank	Rider	Team	Time
1	Cyrille Guimard (FRA)	Gan–Mercier–Hutchinson	6h 00' 31"
2	Michael Wright (GBR)	Gitane–Frigécrème	s.t.
3	Gerben Karstens (NED)	Rokado–Colders	s.t.
4	Rik Van Linden (BEL)	Van Cauter–Magniflex–de Gribaldy	s.t.
5	Eddy Merckx (BEL)	Molteni	s.t.
6	Marino Basso (ITA)	Salvarani	s.t.
7	Pieter Nassen (BEL)	Watney–Avia	s.t.
8	Rolf Wolfshohl (FRG)	Rokado–Colders	s.t.
9	Frans Verbeeck (BEL)	Watney–Avia	s.t.
10	Gerard Vianen (NED)	Goudsmit–Hoff	s.t.

General classification after stage 1

Rank	Rider	Team	Time
1	Cyrille Guimard (FRA)	Gan–Mercier–Hutchinson	6h 09' 15"
2	Eddy Merckx (BEL)	Molteni	+ 7"
3	Gerben Karstens (NED)	Rokado–Colders	+ 16"
4	Roger Swerts (BEL)	Molteni	+ 18"
5	Raymond Poulidor (FRA)	Gan–Mercier–Hutchinson	+ 19"
6	Joop Zoetemelk (NED)	Beaulieu–Flandria	+ 20"
7	Luis Ocaña (ESP)	Bic	s.t.
8	Leo Duyndam (NED)	Goudsmit–Hoff	+ 22"
9	Leif Mortensen (DEN)	Bic	+ 24"
10	Gilbert Bellone (FRA)	Rokado–Colders	+ 27"

== Stage 2 ==
3 July 1972 - Saint-Brieuc to La Baule, 206.5 km (128.3 mi)

Stage 2 result

Rank	Rider	Team	Time
1	Rik Van Linden (BEL)	Van Cauter–Magniflex–de Gribaldy	5h 09' 43"
2	Walter Godefroot (BEL)	Peugeot–BP–Michelin	s.t.
3	Daniel Van Ryckeghem (BEL)	Sonolor–Lejeune	s.t.
4	Marino Basso (ITA)	Salvarani	s.t.
5	Régis Delépine (FRA)	Gan–Mercier–Hutchinson	s.t.
6	Cyrille Guimard (FRA)	Gan–Mercier–Hutchinson	s.t.
7	Wilfried Peffgen (FRG)	Rokado–Colders	s.t.
8	Guido Reybrouck (BEL)	Salvarani	s.t.
9	Gerben Karstens (NED)	Rokado–Colders	s.t.
10	Leif Mortensen (DEN)	Bic	s.t.

General classification after stage 2

Rank	Rider	Team	Time
1	Cyrille Guimard (FRA)	Gan–Mercier–Hutchinson	11h 18' 52"
2	Eddy Merckx (BEL)	Molteni	+ 9"
3	Rik Van Linden (BEL)	Van Cauter–Magniflex–de Gribaldy	+ 18"
4	Gerben Karstens (NED)	Rokado–Colders	+ 22"
5	Roger Swerts (BEL)	Molteni	+ 24"
6	Joop Zoetemelk (NED)	Beaulieu–Flandria	s.t.
7	Raymond Poulidor (FRA)	Gan–Mercier–Hutchinson	+ 25"
8	Leo Duyndam (NED)	Goudsmit–Hoff	+ 28"
9	Luis Ocaña (ESP)	Bic	s.t.
10	Leif Mortensen (DEN)	Bic	+ 30"

== Stage 3a ==
4 July 1972 - Pornichet to Saint-Jean-de-Monts, 161 km (100 mi)

Stage 3a result

Rank	Rider	Team	Time
1	Ercole Gualazzini (ITA)	Salvarani	3h 56' 33"
2	Noël Van Clooster (BEL)	Watney–Avia	s.t.
3	Herman Beysens (BEL)	Van Cauter–Magniflex–de Gribaldy	s.t.
4	Jürgen Tschan (FRG)	Peugeot–BP–Michelin	s.t.
5	Bernard Guyot (FRA)	Sonolor–Lejeune	s.t.
6	Gérard Moneyron (FRA)	Gan–Mercier–Hutchinson	s.t.
7	Jos Deschoenmaecker (BEL)	Molteni	s.t.
8	Marino Basso (ITA)	Salvarani	+ 7"
9	Rik Van Linden (BEL)	Van Cauter–Magniflex–de Gribaldy	s.t.
10	Cyrille Guimard (FRA)	Gan–Mercier–Hutchinson	s.t.

General classification after stage 3a

Rank	Rider	Team	Time
1	Cyrille Guimard (FRA)	Gan–Mercier–Hutchinson	15h 15' 32"
2	Eddy Merckx (BEL)	Molteni	+ 9"
3	Rik Van Linden (BEL)	Van Cauter–Magniflex–de Gribaldy	+ 18"
4	Gerben Karstens (NED)	Rokado–Colders	+ 20"
5	Joop Zoetemelk (NED)	Beaulieu–Flandria	+ 24"
6	Roger Swerts (BEL)	Molteni	s.t.
7	Noël Van Clooster (BEL)	Watney–Avia	+ 25"
8	Raymond Poulidor (FRA)	Gan–Mercier–Hutchinson	+ 28"
9	Leo Duyndam (NED)	Goudsmit–Hoff	s.t.
10	Luis Ocaña (ESP)	Bic	s.t.

== Stage 3b ==
4 July 1972 - Merlin-Plage, 16.2 km (10.1 mi) (TTT)

Stage 3b result

Rank	Team	Time
1	Molteni	1h 37' 03"
2	Peugeot–BP–Michelin	+ 1' 39"
3	Bic	+ 2' 17"
4	Gan–Mercier–Hutchinson	+ 3' 14"
5	Sonolor–Lejeune	+ 3' 41"
6	Watney–Avia	+ 4' 49"
7	Goudsmit–Hoff	+ 4' 57"
8	Rokado–Colders	+ 4' 59"
9	Beaulieu–Flandria	+ 5' 05"
10	Van Cauter–Magniflex–de Gribaldy	+ 5' 08"

General classification after stage 3b

Rank	Rider	Team	Time
1	Eddy Merckx (BEL)	Molteni	15h 15' 21"
2	Cyrille Guimard (FRA)	Gan–Mercier–Hutchinson	+ 11"
3	Roger Swerts (BEL)	Molteni	+ 15"
4	Rik Van Linden (BEL)	Van Cauter–Magniflex–de Gribaldy	+ 29"
5	Gerben Karstens (NED)	Rokado–Colders	+ 31"
6	Joop Zoetemelk (NED)	Beaulieu–Flandria	s.t.
7	Luis Ocaña (ESP)	Bic	+ 34"
8	Jürgen Tschan (FRG)	Peugeot–BP–Michelin	+ 35"
9	Noël Van Clooster (BEL)	Watney–Avia	+ 36"
10	Raymond Poulidor (FRA)	Gan–Mercier–Hutchinson	s.t.

== Stage 4 ==
5 July 1972 - Merlin-Plage to Royan, 236 km (147 mi)

Stage 4 result

Rank	Rider	Team	Time
1	Cyrille Guimard (FRA)	Gan–Mercier–Hutchinson	5h 22' 43"
2	Ronny Van Marcke (BEL)	Beaulieu–Flandria	s.t.
3	Frans Verbeeck (BEL)	Watney–Avia	s.t.
4	Walter Godefroot (BEL)	Peugeot–BP–Michelin	s.t.
5	Cees Koeken (NED)	Goudsmit–Hoff	s.t.
6	Italo Zilioli (ITA)	Salvarani	s.t.
7	Eddy Merckx (BEL)	Molteni	s.t.
8	Ludo Van Staeyen (BEL)	Van Cauter–Magniflex–de Gribaldy	s.t.
9	Herman Beysens (BEL)	Van Cauter–Magniflex–de Gribaldy	s.t.
10	Roger Swerts (BEL)	Molteni	s.t.

General classification after stage 4

Rank	Rider	Team	Time
1	Cyrille Guimard (FRA)	Gan–Mercier–Hutchinson	20h 37' 45"
2	Eddy Merckx (BEL)	Molteni	+ 19"
3	Roger Swerts (BEL)	Molteni	+ 34"
4	Walter Godefroot (BEL)	Peugeot–BP–Michelin	+ 53"
5	Luis Ocaña (ESP)	Bic	s.t.
6	Bernard Thévenet (FRA)	Peugeot–BP–Michelin	+ 59"
7	Yves Hézard (FRA)	Sonolor–Lejeune	+ 1' 04"
8	Frans Verbeeck (BEL)	Watney–Avia	+ 1' 06"
9	Felice Gimondi (ITA)	Salvarani	+ 1' 07"
10	Ronny Van Marcke (BEL)	Beaulieu–Flandria	+ 1' 12"

== Stage 5a ==
6 July 1972 - Royan to Bordeaux, 133.5 km (83.0 mi)

Stage 5a result

Rank	Rider	Team	Time
1	Walter Godefroot (BEL)	Peugeot–BP–Michelin	2h 59' 33"
2	Marino Basso (ITA)	Salvarani	s.t.
3	Cyrille Guimard (FRA)	Gan–Mercier–Hutchinson	s.t.
4	Daniel Van Ryckeghem (BEL)	Sonolor–Lejeune	s.t.
5	Gerben Karstens (NED)	Rokado–Colders	s.t.
6	Rik Van Linden (BEL)	Van Cauter–Magniflex–de Gribaldy	s.t.
7	Frans Verbeeck (BEL)	Watney–Avia	s.t.
8	Marinus Wagtmans (NED)	Goudsmit–Hoff	s.t.
9	Gerard Vianen (NED)	Goudsmit–Hoff	s.t.
10	Pieter Nassen (BEL)	Watney–Avia	s.t.

General classification after stage 5a

Rank	Rider	Team	Time
1	Cyrille Guimard (FRA)	Gan–Mercier–Hutchinson	23h 37' 04"
2	Eddy Merckx (BEL)	Molteni	+ 33"
3	Walter Godefroot (BEL)	Peugeot–BP–Michelin	+ 47"
4	Roger Swerts (BEL)	Molteni	+ 48"
5	Luis Ocaña (ESP)	Bic	+ 1' 07"
6	Bernard Thévenet (FRA)	Peugeot–BP–Michelin	+ 1' 13"
7	Yves Hézard (FRA)	Sonolor–Lejeune	+ 1' 18"
8	Frans Verbeeck (BEL)	Watney–Avia	+ 1' 20"
9	Felice Gimondi (ITA)	Salvarani	+ 1' 21"
10	Ronny Van Marcke (BEL)	Beaulieu–Flandria	+ 1' 26"

== Stage 5b ==
6 July 1972 - Bordeaux, 12.7 km (7.9 mi) (ITT)

Stage 5b result

Rank	Rider	Team	Time
1	Eddy Merckx (BEL)	Molteni	16' 05"
2	Roger Swerts (BEL)	Molteni	+ 2"
3	Luis Ocaña (ESP)	Bic	+ 15"
4	Raymond Poulidor (FRA)	Gan–Mercier–Hutchinson	+ 20"
5	Yves Hézard (FRA)	Sonolor–Lejeune	+ 23"
6	Cyrille Guimard (FRA)	Gan–Mercier–Hutchinson	+ 24"
7	Joaquim Agostinho (POR)	Van Cauter–Magniflex–de Gribaldy	s.t.
8	Bernard Thévenet (FRA)	Peugeot–BP–Michelin	+ 32"
9	Leif Mortensen (DEN)	Bic	+ 40"
10	Felice Gimondi (ITA)	Salvarani	+ 41"

General classification after stage 5b

Rank	Rider	Team	Time
1	Cyrille Guimard (FRA)	Gan–Mercier–Hutchinson	23h 53' 33"
2	Eddy Merckx (BEL)	Molteni	+ 9"
3	Roger Swerts (BEL)	Molteni	+ 26"
4	Luis Ocaña (ESP)	Bic	+ 58"
5	Yves Hézard (FRA)	Sonolor–Lejeune	+ 1' 17"
6	Bernard Thévenet (FRA)	Peugeot–BP–Michelin	+ 1' 21"
7	Walter Godefroot (BEL)	Peugeot–BP–Michelin	+ 1' 32"
8	Felice Gimondi (ITA)	Salvarani	+ 1' 38"
9	Frans Verbeeck (BEL)	Watney–Avia	+ 1' 48"
10	Gerard Vianen (NED)	Goudsmit–Hoff	+ 2' 15"

== Stage 6 ==
7 July 1972 - Bordeaux to Bayonne, 205 km (127 mi)

Stage 6 result

Rank	Rider	Team	Time
1	Leo Duyndam (NED)	Goudsmit–Hoff	5h 44' 10"
2	Luigi Castelletti (ITA)	Salvarani	s.t.
3	Guy Santy (FRA)	Bic	s.t.
4	René Grelin (FRA)	Gan–Mercier–Hutchinson	s.t.
5	Willy Van Neste (BEL)	Beaulieu–Flandria	s.t.
6	Joseph Bruyère (BEL)	Molteni	+ 42"
7	Ercole Gualazzini (ITA)	Salvarani	+ 1' 29"
8	Régis Delépine (FRA)	Gan–Mercier–Hutchinson	s.t.
9	Eddy Merckx (BEL)	Molteni	+ 1' 33"
10	Rik Van Linden (BEL)	Van Cauter–Magniflex–de Gribaldy	s.t.

General classification after stage 6

Rank	Rider	Team	Time
1	Cyrille Guimard (FRA)	Gan–Mercier–Hutchinson	29h 39' 12"
2	Eddy Merckx (BEL)	Molteni	+ 11"
3	Roger Swerts (BEL)	Molteni	+ 30"
4	Luis Ocaña (ESP)	Bic	+ 1' 02"
5	Yves Hézard (FRA)	Sonolor–Lejeune	+ 1' 21"
6	Bernard Thévenet (FRA)	Peugeot–BP–Michelin	+ 1' 25"
7	Walter Godefroot (BEL)	Peugeot–BP–Michelin	+ 1' 36"
8	Felice Gimondi (ITA)	Salvarani	+ 1' 42"
9	Frans Verbeeck (BEL)	Watney–Avia	+ 1' 52"
10	Gerard Vianen (NED)	Goudsmit–Hoff	+ 2' 19"

== Rest Day 1 ==
8 July 1972 - Bayonne

== Stage 7 ==
9 July 1972 - Bayonne to Pau, 220.5 km (137.0 mi)

Stage 7 result

Rank	Rider	Team	Time
1	Yves Hézard (FRA)	Sonolor–Lejeune	6h 02' 19"
2	Cyrille Guimard (FRA)	Gan–Mercier–Hutchinson	s.t.
3	Felice Gimondi (ITA)	Salvarani	s.t.
4	Joop Zoetemelk (NED)	Beaulieu–Flandria	s.t.
5	Eddy Merckx (BEL)	Molteni	s.t.
6	Raymond Poulidor (FRA)	Gan–Mercier–Hutchinson	s.t.
7	Luis Ocaña (ESP)	Bic	+ 1' 49"
8	Edward Janssens (BEL)	Van Cauter–Magniflex–de Gribaldy	+ 3' 09"
9	Lucien Van Impe (BEL)	Sonolor–Lejeune	+ 5' 03"
10	Roger Pingeon (FRA)	Peugeot–BP–Michelin	+ 6' 06"

General classification after stage 7

Rank	Rider	Team	Time
1	Cyrille Guimard (FRA)	Gan–Mercier–Hutchinson	35h 41' 31"
2	Eddy Merckx (BEL)	Molteni	+ 11"
3	Yves Hézard (FRA)	Sonolor–Lejeune	+ 1' 21"
4	Felice Gimondi (ITA)	Salvarani	+ 1' 42"
5	Luis Ocaña (ESP)	Bic	+ 2' 51"
6	Raymond Poulidor (FRA)	Gan–Mercier–Hutchinson	+ 4' 17"
7	Joop Zoetemelk (NED)	Beaulieu–Flandria	+ 4' 39"
8	Bernard Thévenet (FRA)	Peugeot–BP–Michelin	+ 7' 57"
9	Roger Swerts (BEL)	Molteni	+ 10' 29"
10	Lucien Van Impe (BEL)	Sonolor–Lejeune	+ 10' 49"

== Stage 8 ==
10 July 1972 - Pau to Luchon, 163.5 km (101.6 mi)

Stage 8 result

Rank	Rider	Team	Time
1	Eddy Merckx (BEL)	Molteni	4h 54' 48"
2	Lucien Van Impe (BEL)	Sonolor–Lejeune	+ 1"
3	Luis Ocaña (ESP)	Bic	+ 8"
4	Joop Zoetemelk (NED)	Beaulieu–Flandria	+ 2' 15"
5	Mariano Martínez (FRA)	Van Cauter–Magniflex–de Gribaldy	s.t.
6	Raymond Poulidor (FRA)	Gan–Mercier–Hutchinson	s.t.
7	Felice Gimondi (ITA)	Salvarani	+ 2' 44"
8	Cyrille Guimard (FRA)	Gan–Mercier–Hutchinson	s.t.
9	Bernard Thévenet (FRA)	Peugeot–BP–Michelin	s.t.
10	Joaquim Agostinho (POR)	Van Cauter–Magniflex–de Gribaldy	+ 3' 31"

General classification after stage 8

Rank	Rider	Team	Time
1	Eddy Merckx (BEL)	Molteni	40h 36' 30"
2	Cyrille Guimard (FRA)	Gan–Mercier–Hutchinson	+ 2' 33"
3	Luis Ocaña (ESP)	Bic	+ 2' 48"
4	Felice Gimondi (ITA)	Salvarani	+ 4' 15"
5	Yves Hézard (FRA)	Sonolor–Lejeune	+ 5' 48"
6	Raymond Poulidor (FRA)	Gan–Mercier–Hutchinson	+ 6' 21"
7	Joop Zoetemelk (NED)	Beaulieu–Flandria	+ 6' 43"
8	Bernard Thévenet (FRA)	Peugeot–BP–Michelin	+ 10' 30"
9	Lucien Van Impe (BEL)	Sonolor–Lejeune	+ 10' 39"
10	Mariano Martínez (FRA)	Van Cauter–Magniflex–de Gribaldy	+ 13' 59"

== Stage 9 ==
11 July 1972 - Luchon to Colomiers, 179 km (111 mi)

Stage 9 result

Rank	Rider	Team	Time
1	Jos Huysmans (BEL)	Molteni	4h 43' 01"
2	Michael Wright (GBR)	Gitane–Frigécrème	s.t.
3	Jean-Pierre Danguillaume (FRA)	Peugeot–BP–Michelin	s.t.
4	Rolf Wolfshohl (FRG)	Rokado–Colders	s.t.
5	Jacques Cadiou (FRA)	Gan–Mercier–Hutchinson	s.t.
6	Gerard Vianen (NED)	Goudsmit–Hoff	s.t.
7	Antoon Houbrechts (BEL)	Salvarani	s.t.
8	Walter Ricci (FRA)	Sonolor–Lejeune	s.t.
9	Ger Harings (NED)	Goudsmit–Hoff	s.t.
10	Bernard Thévenet (FRA)	Peugeot–BP–Michelin	s.t.

General classification after stage 9

Rank	Rider	Team	Time
1	Eddy Merckx (BEL)	Molteni	45h 20' 40"
2	Cyrille Guimard (FRA)	Gan–Mercier–Hutchinson	+ 2' 37"
3	Luis Ocaña (ESP)	Bic	+ 2' 52"
4	Felice Gimondi (ITA)	Salvarani	+ 4' 19"
5	Yves Hézard (FRA)	Sonolor–Lejeune	+ 5' 52"
6	Raymond Poulidor (FRA)	Gan–Mercier–Hutchinson	+ 6' 25"
7	Joop Zoetemelk (NED)	Beaulieu–Flandria	+ 6' 47"
8	Bernard Thévenet (FRA)	Peugeot–BP–Michelin	+ 10' 34"
9	Lucien Van Impe (BEL)	Sonolor–Lejeune	+ 10' 43"
10	Mariano Martínez (FRA)	Van Cauter–Magniflex–de Gribaldy	+ 14' 03"

== Stage 10 ==
12 July 1972 - Castres to La Grande-Motte, 210 km (130 mi)

Stage 10 result

Rank	Rider	Team	Time
1	Willy Teirlinck (BEL)	Sonolor–Lejeune	6h 08' 19"
2	Barry Hoban (GBR)	Gan–Mercier–Hutchinson	+ 3"
3	Frans Verbeeck (BEL)	Watney–Avia	s.t.
4	Guido Reybrouck (BEL)	Salvarani	s.t.
5	Cyrille Guimard (FRA)	Gan–Mercier–Hutchinson	s.t.
6	Marinus Wagtmans (NED)	Goudsmit–Hoff	s.t.
7	Pieter Nassen (BEL)	Watney–Avia	s.t.
8	Marino Basso (ITA)	Salvarani	s.t.
9	Roger Swerts (BEL)	Molteni	s.t.
10	Rik Van Linden (BEL)	Van Cauter–Magniflex–de Gribaldy	s.t.

General classification after stage 10

Rank	Rider	Team	Time
1	Eddy Merckx (BEL)	Molteni	51h 28' 58"
2	Cyrille Guimard (FRA)	Gan–Mercier–Hutchinson	+ 2' 39"
3	Luis Ocaña (ESP)	Bic	+ 2' 56"
4	Felice Gimondi (ITA)	Salvarani	+ 4' 23"
5	Yves Hézard (FRA)	Sonolor–Lejeune	+ 6' 11"
6	Raymond Poulidor (FRA)	Gan–Mercier–Hutchinson	+ 6' 29"
7	Joop Zoetemelk (NED)	Beaulieu–Flandria	+ 6' 51"
8	Bernard Thévenet (FRA)	Peugeot–BP–Michelin	+ 10' 38"
9	Lucien Van Impe (BEL)	Sonolor–Lejeune	+ 10' 47"
10	Mariano Martínez (FRA)	Van Cauter–Magniflex–de Gribaldy	+ 14' 07"
