= 1972 Tour de France, Stage 11 to Stage 20b =

Cycling race stages

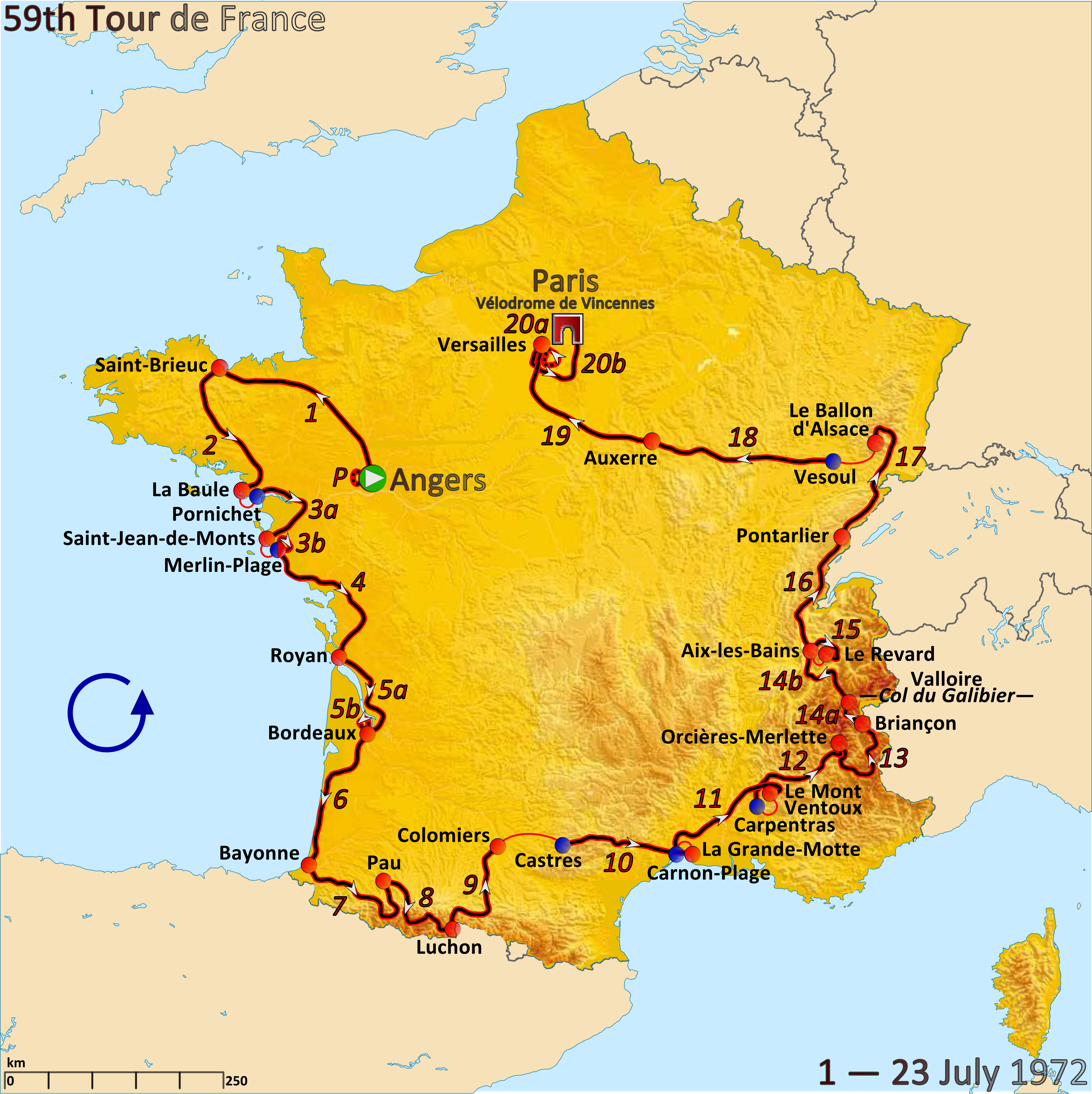
Route of the 1972 Tour de France

The 1972 Tour de France was the 59th edition of Tour de France, one of cycling's Grand Tours. The Tour began in Angers with a prologue individual time trial on July and Stage 11 occurred on 13 July with a mountain stage from Carnon-Plage. The race finished in Paris on 23 July.

== Stage 11 ==
13 July 1972 - Carnon-Plage to Mont Ventoux, 207 km (128.6 mi)

Stage 11 result

Rank	Rider	Team	Time
1	Bernard Thévenet (FRA)	Peugeot–BP–Michelin	7h 13' 45"
2	Eddy Merckx (BEL)	Molteni	+ 34"
3	Luis Ocaña (ESP)	Bic	+ 39"
4	Raymond Poulidor (FRA)	Gan–Mercier–Hutchinson	+ 51"
5	Mariano Martínez (FRA)	Van Cauter–Magniflex–de Gribaldy	+ 1' 01"
6	Joaquim Agostinho (POR)	Van Cauter–Magniflex–de Gribaldy	+ 1' 18"
7	Lucien Van Impe (BEL)	Sonolor–Lejeune	+ 1' 25"
8	Felice Gimondi (ITA)	Salvarani	+ 1' 46"
9	Joop Zoetemelk (NED)	Beaulieu–Flandria	+ 1' 55"
10	Edward Janssens (BEL)	Van Cauter–Magniflex–de Gribaldy	+ 1' 58"

General classification after stage 11

Rank	Rider	Team	Time
1	Eddy Merckx (BEL)	Molteni	58h 43' 17"
2	Luis Ocaña (ESP)	Bic	+ 3' 01"
3	Cyrille Guimard (FRA)	Gan–Mercier–Hutchinson	+ 4' 08"
4	Felice Gimondi (ITA)	Salvarani	+ 5' 35"
5	Raymond Poulidor (FRA)	Gan–Mercier–Hutchinson	+ 6' 46"
6	Joop Zoetemelk (NED)	Beaulieu–Flandria	+ 8' 12"
7	Yves Hézard (FRA)	Sonolor–Lejeune	+ 9' 45"
8	Bernard Thévenet (FRA)	Peugeot–BP–Michelin	+ 10' 04"
9	Lucien Van Impe (BEL)	Sonolor–Lejeune	+ 11' 38"
10	Mariano Martínez (FRA)	Van Cauter–Magniflex–de Gribaldy	+ 14' 34"

== Stage 12 ==
14 July 1972 - Carpentras to Orcières-Merlette, 192 km (119.3 mi)

Stage 12 result

Rank	Rider	Team	Time
1	Lucien Van Impe (BEL)	Sonolor–Lejeune	5h 38' 33"
2	Joaquim Agostinho (POR)	Van Cauter–Magniflex–de Gribaldy	+ 3"
3	Eddy Merckx (BEL)	Molteni	+ 1' 17"
4	Luis Ocaña (ESP)	Bic	+ 1' 18"
5	Joop Zoetemelk (NED)	Beaulieu–Flandria	+ 1' 20"
6	Mariano Martínez (FRA)	Van Cauter–Magniflex–de Gribaldy	s.t.
7	Cyrille Guimard (FRA)	Gan–Mercier–Hutchinson	s.t.
8	Raymond Poulidor (FRA)	Gan–Mercier–Hutchinson	s.t.
9	Yves Hézard (FRA)	Sonolor–Lejeune	s.t.
10	Felice Gimondi (ITA)	Salvarani	+ 1' 24"

General classification after stage 12

Rank	Rider	Team	Time
1	Eddy Merckx (BEL)	Molteni	64h 23' 07"
2	Luis Ocaña (ESP)	Bic	+ 3' 02"
3	Cyrille Guimard (FRA)	Gan–Mercier–Hutchinson	+ 4' 05"
4	Felice Gimondi (ITA)	Salvarani	+ 5' 42"
5	Raymond Poulidor (FRA)	Gan–Mercier–Hutchinson	+ 6' 49"
6	Joop Zoetemelk (NED)	Beaulieu–Flandria	+ 8' 15"
7	Yves Hézard (FRA)	Sonolor–Lejeune	+ 9' 48"
8	Lucien Van Impe (BEL)	Sonolor–Lejeune	+ 10' 21"
9	Bernard Thévenet (FRA)	Peugeot–BP–Michelin	+ 10' 53"
10	Mariano Martínez (FRA)	Van Cauter–Magniflex–de Gribaldy	+ 14' 37"

== Rest Day 2 ==
15 July 1972 - Orcières-Merlette

== Stage 13 ==
16 July 1972 - Orcières-Merlette to Briançon, 201 km (125 mi)

Stage 13 result

Rank	Rider	Team	Time
1	Eddy Merckx (BEL)	Molteni	6h 26' 12"
2	Felice Gimondi (ITA)	Salvarani	+ 1' 31"
3	Cyrille Guimard (FRA)	Gan–Mercier–Hutchinson	s.t.
4	Lucien Van Impe (BEL)	Sonolor–Lejeune	s.t.
5	Raymond Poulidor (FRA)	Gan–Mercier–Hutchinson	s.t.
6	Joaquim Agostinho (POR)	Van Cauter–Magniflex–de Gribaldy	+ 1' 34"
7	Mariano Martínez (FRA)	Van Cauter–Magniflex–de Gribaldy	+ 1' 37"
8	Yves Hézard (FRA)	Sonolor–Lejeune	+ 1' 40"
9	Luis Ocaña (ESP)	Bic	+ 1' 41"
10	Martin Van Den Bossche (BEL)	Molteni	+ 6' 05"

General classification after stage 13

Rank	Rider	Team	Time
1	Eddy Merckx (BEL)	Molteni	70h 49' 19"
2	Luis Ocaña (ESP)	Bic	+ 4' 43"
3	Cyrille Guimard (FRA)	Gan–Mercier–Hutchinson	+ 5' 32"
4	Felice Gimondi (ITA)	Salvarani	+ 7' 13"
5	Raymond Poulidor (FRA)	Gan–Mercier–Hutchinson	+ 8' 20"
6	Yves Hézard (FRA)	Sonolor–Lejeune	+ 11' 28"
7	Lucien Van Impe (BEL)	Sonolor–Lejeune	+ 11' 52"
8	Joop Zoetemelk (NED)	Beaulieu–Flandria	+ 15' 42"
9	Mariano Martínez (FRA)	Van Cauter–Magniflex–de Gribaldy	+ 16' 14"
10	Joaquim Agostinho (POR)	Van Cauter–Magniflex–de Gribaldy	+ 19' 09"

== Stage 14a ==
17 July 1972 - Briançon to Valloire, 51 km (32 mi)

Stage 14a result

Rank	Rider	Team	Time
1	Eddy Merckx (BEL)	Molteni	1h 32' 02"
2	Joop Zoetemelk (NED)	Beaulieu–Flandria	s.t.
3	Joaquim Agostinho (POR)	Van Cauter–Magniflex–de Gribaldy	+ 24"
4	Edward Janssens (BEL)	Van Cauter–Magniflex–de Gribaldy	s.t.
5	Cyrille Guimard (FRA)	Gan–Mercier–Hutchinson	+ 56"
6	Felice Gimondi (ITA)	Salvarani	s.t.
7	Mariano Martínez (FRA)	Van Cauter–Magniflex–de Gribaldy	s.t.
8	Antoon Houbrechts (BEL)	Salvarani	s.t.
9	Jozef Spruyt (BEL)	Molteni	+ 58"
10	Raymond Delisle (FRA)	Peugeot–BP–Michelin	+ 1' 00"

General classification after stage 14a

Rank	Rider	Team	Time
1	Eddy Merckx (BEL)	Molteni	72h 21' 21"
2	Cyrille Guimard (FRA)	Gan–Mercier–Hutchinson	+ 6' 22"
3	Luis Ocaña (ESP)	Bic	+ 6' 54"
4	Felice Gimondi (ITA)	Salvarani	+ 8' 09"
5	Raymond Poulidor (FRA)	Gan–Mercier–Hutchinson	+ 9' 54"
6	Lucien Van Impe (BEL)	Sonolor–Lejeune	+ 14' 03"
7	Yves Hézard (FRA)	Sonolor–Lejeune	+ 15' 32"
8	Joop Zoetemelk (NED)	Beaulieu–Flandria	+ 15' 42"
9	Mariano Martínez (FRA)	Van Cauter–Magniflex–de Gribaldy	+ 17' 10"
10	Joaquim Agostinho (POR)	Van Cauter–Magniflex–de Gribaldy	+ 19' 33"

== Stage 14b ==
17 July 1972 - Valloire to Aix-les-Bains, 151 km (94 mi)

Stage 14b result

Rank	Rider	Team	Time
1	Cyrille Guimard (FRA)	Gan–Mercier–Hutchinson	4h 48' 53"
2	Eddy Merckx (BEL)	Molteni	s.t.
3	Felice Gimondi (ITA)	Salvarani	s.t.
4	Joop Zoetemelk (NED)	Beaulieu–Flandria	s.t.
5	Lucien Van Impe (BEL)	Sonolor–Lejeune	s.t.
6	Joaquim Agostinho (POR)	Van Cauter–Magniflex–de Gribaldy	s.t.
7	Raymond Poulidor (FRA)	Gan–Mercier–Hutchinson	s.t.
8	Mariano Martínez (FRA)	Van Cauter–Magniflex–de Gribaldy	s.t.
9	Raymond Delisle (FRA)	Peugeot–BP–Michelin	+ 4"
10	Jack Mourioux (FRA)	Gan–Mercier–Hutchinson	+ 3' 26"

General classification after stage 14b

Rank	Rider	Team	Time
1	Eddy Merckx (BEL)	Molteni	77h 10' 14"
2	Cyrille Guimard (FRA)	Gan–Mercier–Hutchinson	+ 6' 20"
3	Felice Gimondi (ITA)	Salvarani	+ 8' 09"
4	Raymond Poulidor (FRA)	Gan–Mercier–Hutchinson	+ 9' 54"
5	Luis Ocaña (ESP)	Bic	+ 12' 23"
6	Lucien Van Impe (BEL)	Sonolor–Lejeune	+ 14' 03"
7	Joop Zoetemelk (NED)	Beaulieu–Flandria	+ 15' 42"
8	Mariano Martínez (FRA)	Van Cauter–Magniflex–de Gribaldy	+ 17' 10"
9	Yves Hézard (FRA)	Sonolor–Lejeune	+ 19' 08"
10	Joaquim Agostinho (POR)	Van Cauter–Magniflex–de Gribaldy	+ 19' 33"

== Stage 15 ==
18 July 1972 - Aix-les-Bains to Le Revard, 28 km (17 mi)

Stage 15 result

Rank	Rider	Team	Time
1	Cyrille Guimard (FRA)	Gan–Mercier–Hutchinson	1h 09' 49"
2	Eddy Merckx (BEL)	Molteni	s.t.
3	Lucien Van Impe (BEL)	Sonolor–Lejeune	s.t.
4	Raymond Poulidor (FRA)	Gan–Mercier–Hutchinson	s.t.
5	Joop Zoetemelk (NED)	Beaulieu–Flandria	+ 3"
6	Joaquim Agostinho (POR)	Van Cauter–Magniflex–de Gribaldy	+ 4"
7	Mariano Martínez (FRA)	Van Cauter–Magniflex–de Gribaldy	+ 6"
8	Raymond Delisle (FRA)	Peugeot–BP–Michelin	+ 15"
9	Edward Janssens (BEL)	Van Cauter–Magniflex–de Gribaldy	+ 43"
10	Yves Hézard (FRA)	Sonolor–Lejeune	+ 1' 28"

General classification after stage 15

Rank	Rider	Team	Time
1	Eddy Merckx (BEL)	Molteni	78h 19' 53"
2	Cyrille Guimard (FRA)	Gan–Mercier–Hutchinson	+ 6' 20"
3	Raymond Poulidor (FRA)	Gan–Mercier–Hutchinson	+ 9' 54"
4	Felice Gimondi (ITA)	Salvarani	+ 10' 01"
5	Lucien Van Impe (BEL)	Sonolor–Lejeune	+ 14' 03"
6	Joop Zoetemelk (NED)	Beaulieu–Flandria	+ 15' 45"
7	Mariano Martínez (FRA)	Van Cauter–Magniflex–de Gribaldy	+ 17' 13"
8	Joaquim Agostinho (POR)	Van Cauter–Magniflex–de Gribaldy	+ 19' 37"
9	Yves Hézard (FRA)	Sonolor–Lejeune	+ 20' 36"
10	Bernard Thévenet (FRA)	Peugeot–BP–Michelin	+ 34' 36"

== Stage 16 ==
19 July 1972 - Aix-les-Bains to Pontarlier, 198.5 km (123.3 mi)

Stage 16 result

Rank	Rider	Team	Time
1	Willy Teirlinck (BEL)	Sonolor–Lejeune	6h 08' 17"
2	Leif Mortensen (DEN)	Bic	s.t.
3	Frans Verbeeck (BEL)	Watney–Avia	+ 45"
4	Eddy Verstraeten (BEL)	Watney–Avia	+ 46"
5	Jan Krekels (NED)	Goudsmit–Hoff	+ 56"
6	Rik Van Linden (BEL)	Van Cauter–Magniflex–de Gribaldy	s.t.
7	Gerben Karstens (NED)	Rokado–Colders	s.t.
8	Marino Basso (ITA)	Salvarani	s.t.
9	Wilfried Peffgen (FRG)	Rokado–Colders	s.t.
10	Cyrille Guimard (FRA)	Gan–Mercier–Hutchinson	s.t.

General classification after stage 16

Rank	Rider	Team	Time
1	Eddy Merckx (BEL)	Molteni	84h 29' 06"
2	Cyrille Guimard (FRA)	Gan–Mercier–Hutchinson	+ 6' 16"
3	Raymond Poulidor (FRA)	Gan–Mercier–Hutchinson	+ 9' 54"
4	Felice Gimondi (ITA)	Salvarani	+ 10' 01"
5	Lucien Van Impe (BEL)	Sonolor–Lejeune	+ 14' 03"
6	Joop Zoetemelk (NED)	Beaulieu–Flandria	+ 15' 45"
7	Mariano Martínez (FRA)	Van Cauter–Magniflex–de Gribaldy	+ 17' 13"
8	Joaquim Agostinho (POR)	Van Cauter–Magniflex–de Gribaldy	+ 19' 37"
9	Yves Hézard (FRA)	Sonolor–Lejeune	+ 20' 36"
10	Bernard Thévenet (FRA)	Peugeot–BP–Michelin	+ 34' 36"

== Stage 17 ==
20 July 1972 - Pontarlier to Ballon d'Alsace, 213 km (132 mi)

Stage 17 result

Rank	Rider	Team	Time
1	Bernard Thévenet (FRA)	Peugeot–BP–Michelin	5h 59' 08"
2	Joop Zoetemelk (NED)	Beaulieu–Flandria	+ 4"
3	Mariano Martínez (FRA)	Van Cauter–Magniflex–de Gribaldy	+ 7"
4	Eddy Merckx (BEL)	Molteni	+ 30"
5	Lucien Van Impe (BEL)	Sonolor–Lejeune	+ 32"
6	Yves Hézard (FRA)	Sonolor–Lejeune	+ 36"
7	Felice Gimondi (ITA)	Salvarani	s.t.
8	Karl-Heinz Kunde (FRG)	Rokado–Colders	s.t.
9	Raymond Poulidor (FRA)	Gan–Mercier–Hutchinson	+ 39"
10	Leif Mortensen (DEN)	Bic	+ 42"

General classification after stage 17

Rank	Rider	Team	Time
1	Eddy Merckx (BEL)	Molteni	90h 28' 44"
2	Cyrille Guimard (FRA)	Gan–Mercier–Hutchinson	+ 7' 58"
3	Raymond Poulidor (FRA)	Gan–Mercier–Hutchinson	+ 10' 03"
4	Felice Gimondi (ITA)	Salvarani	+ 10' 07"
5	Lucien Van Impe (BEL)	Sonolor–Lejeune	+ 14' 05"
6	Joop Zoetemelk (NED)	Beaulieu–Flandria	+ 15' 17"
7	Mariano Martínez (FRA)	Van Cauter–Magniflex–de Gribaldy	+ 16' 53"
8	Yves Hézard (FRA)	Sonolor–Lejeune	+ 20' 42"
9	Joaquim Agostinho (POR)	Van Cauter–Magniflex–de Gribaldy	+ 20' 52"
10	Bernard Thévenet (FRA)	Peugeot–BP–Michelin	+ 34' 06"

== Stage 18 ==
21 July 1972 - Vesoul to Auxerre, 257.5 km (160.0 mi)

Stage 18 result

Rank	Rider	Team	Time
1	Marinus Wagtmans (NED)	Goudsmit–Hoff	7h 38' 21"
2	Rik Van Linden (BEL)	Van Cauter–Magniflex–de Gribaldy	+ 20"
3	Frans Verbeeck (BEL)	Watney–Avia	s.t.
4	Willy Teirlinck (BEL)	Sonolor–Lejeune	s.t.
5	Joop Zoetemelk (NED)	Beaulieu–Flandria	s.t.
6	Ludo Van Staeyen (BEL)	Van Cauter–Magniflex–de Gribaldy	s.t.
7	Marino Basso (ITA)	Salvarani	s.t.
8	Jan Krekels (NED)	Goudsmit–Hoff	s.t.
9	Lucien Van Impe (BEL)	Sonolor–Lejeune	s.t.
10	Gerard Vianen (NED)	Goudsmit–Hoff	s.t.

General classification after stage 18

Rank	Rider	Team	Time
1	Eddy Merckx (BEL)	Molteni	98h 07' 25"
2	Raymond Poulidor (FRA)	Gan–Mercier–Hutchinson	+ 10' 03"
3	Felice Gimondi (ITA)	Salvarani	+ 10' 07"
4	Lucien Van Impe (BEL)	Sonolor–Lejeune	+ 14' 05"
5	Joop Zoetemelk (NED)	Beaulieu–Flandria	+ 15' 17"
6	Mariano Martínez (FRA)	Van Cauter–Magniflex–de Gribaldy	+ 16' 53"
7	Yves Hézard (FRA)	Sonolor–Lejeune	+ 20' 42"
8	Joaquim Agostinho (POR)	Van Cauter–Magniflex–de Gribaldy	+ 20' 52"
9	Bernard Thévenet (FRA)	Peugeot–BP–Michelin	+ 34' 06"
10	Edward Janssens (BEL)	Van Cauter–Magniflex–de Gribaldy	+ 36' 37"

== Stage 19 ==
22 July 1972 - Auxerre to Versailles, 230 km (140 mi)

Stage 19 result

Rank	Rider	Team	Time
1	Joseph Bruyère (BEL)	Molteni	6h 41' 55"
2	Giacinto Santambrogio (ITA)	Salvarani	s.t.
3	Guy Santy (FRA)	Bic	+ 1"
4	Gerben Karstens (NED)	Rokado–Colders	+ 10"
5	Rik Van Linden (BEL)	Van Cauter–Magniflex–de Gribaldy	+ 11"
6	Frans Verbeeck (BEL)	Watney–Avia	s.t.
7	Marino Basso (ITA)	Salvarani	s.t.
8	Jan Krekels (NED)	Goudsmit–Hoff	s.t.
9	Evert Dolman (NED)	Beaulieu–Flandria	s.t.
10	Marinus Wagtmans (NED)	Goudsmit–Hoff	s.t.

General classification after stage 19

Rank	Rider	Team	Time
1	Eddy Merckx (BEL)	Molteni	104h 40' 31"
2	Raymond Poulidor (FRA)	Gan–Mercier–Hutchinson	+ 10' 03"
3	Felice Gimondi (ITA)	Salvarani	+ 10' 07"
4	Lucien Van Impe (BEL)	Sonolor–Lejeune	+ 14' 05"
5	Joop Zoetemelk (NED)	Beaulieu–Flandria	+ 15' 17"
6	Mariano Martínez (FRA)	Van Cauter–Magniflex–de Gribaldy	+ 16' 53"
7	Yves Hézard (FRA)	Sonolor–Lejeune	+ 20' 42"
8	Joaquim Agostinho (POR)	Van Cauter–Magniflex–de Gribaldy	+ 30' 52"
9	Bernard Thévenet (FRA)	Peugeot–BP–Michelin	+ 34' 06"
10	Edward Janssens (BEL)	Van Cauter–Magniflex–de Gribaldy	+ 36' 37"

== Stage 20a ==
23 July 1972 - Versailles, 42 km (26 mi) (ITT)

Stage 20a result

Rank	Rider	Team	Time
1	Eddy Merckx (BEL)	Molteni	55' 27"
2	Felice Gimondi (ITA)	Salvarani	+ 34"
3	Yves Hézard (FRA)	Sonolor–Lejeune	+ 1' 10"
4	Raymond Poulidor (FRA)	Gan–Mercier–Hutchinson	+ 1' 31"
5	Leif Mortensen (DEN)	Bic	+ 2' 16"
6	Joseph Bruyère (BEL)	Molteni	+ 2' 18"
7	Lucien Van Impe (BEL)	Sonolor–Lejeune	+ 2' 40"
8	Gérard Moneyron (FRA)	Gan–Mercier–Hutchinson	+ 2' 52"
9	Bernard Thévenet (FRA)	Peugeot–BP–Michelin	+ 3' 05"
10	Roger Swerts (BEL)	Molteni	+ 3' 11"

General classification after stage 20a

Rank	Rider	Team	Time
1	Eddy Merckx (BEL)	Molteni	105h 44' 58"
2	Felice Gimondi (ITA)	Salvarani	+ 10' 41"
3	Raymond Poulidor (FRA)	Gan–Mercier–Hutchinson	+ 11' 34"
4	Lucien Van Impe (BEL)	Sonolor–Lejeune	+ 16' 45"
5	Joop Zoetemelk (NED)	Beaulieu–Flandria	+ 19' 09"
6	Mariano Martínez (FRA)	Van Cauter–Magniflex–de Gribaldy	+ 21' 31"
7	Yves Hézard (FRA)	Sonolor–Lejeune	+ 21' 52"
8	Joaquim Agostinho (POR)	Van Cauter–Magniflex–de Gribaldy	+ 34' 16"
9	Bernard Thévenet (FRA)	Peugeot–BP–Michelin	+ 37' 11"
10	Edward Janssens (BEL)	Van Cauter–Magniflex–de Gribaldy	+ 42' 33"

== Stage 20b ==
23 July 1972 - Versailles to Paris, 89 km (55 mi)

Stage 20b result

Rank	Rider	Team	Time
1	Willy Teirlinck (BEL)	Sonolor–Lejeune	2h 32' 14"
2	Marino Basso (ITA)	Salvarani	+ 6"
3	Rik Van Linden (BEL)	Van Cauter–Magniflex–de Gribaldy	s.t.
4	Walter Godefroot (BEL)	Peugeot–BP–Michelin	s.t.
5	Gerben Karstens (NED)	Rokado–Colders	s.t.
6	Jan Krekels (NED)	Goudsmit–Hoff	s.t.
7	Pieter Nassen (BEL)	Watney–Avia	s.t.
8	Jack Mourioux (FRA)	Gan–Mercier–Hutchinson	s.t.
9	Marinus Wagtmans (NED)	Goudsmit–Hoff	s.t.
10	Frans Verbeeck (BEL)	Watney–Avia	s.t.

General classification after stage 20b

Rank	Rider	Team	Time
1	Eddy Merckx (BEL)	Molteni	108h 17' 18"
2	Felice Gimondi (ITA)	Salvarani	+ 10' 41"
3	Raymond Poulidor (FRA)	Gan–Mercier–Hutchinson	+ 11' 34"
4	Lucien Van Impe (BEL)	Sonolor–Lejeune	+ 16' 45"
5	Joop Zoetemelk (NED)	Beaulieu–Flandria	+ 19' 09"
6	Mariano Martínez (FRA)	Van Cauter–Magniflex–de Gribaldy	+ 21' 31"
7	Yves Hézard (FRA)	Sonolor–Lejeune	+ 21' 52"
8	Joaquim Agostinho (POR)	Van Cauter–Magniflex–de Gribaldy	+ 34' 16"
9	Bernard Thévenet (FRA)	Peugeot–BP–Michelin	+ 37' 11"
10	Edward Janssens (BEL)	Van Cauter–Magniflex–de Gribaldy	+ 42' 33"
