= 1972 Tour de France =

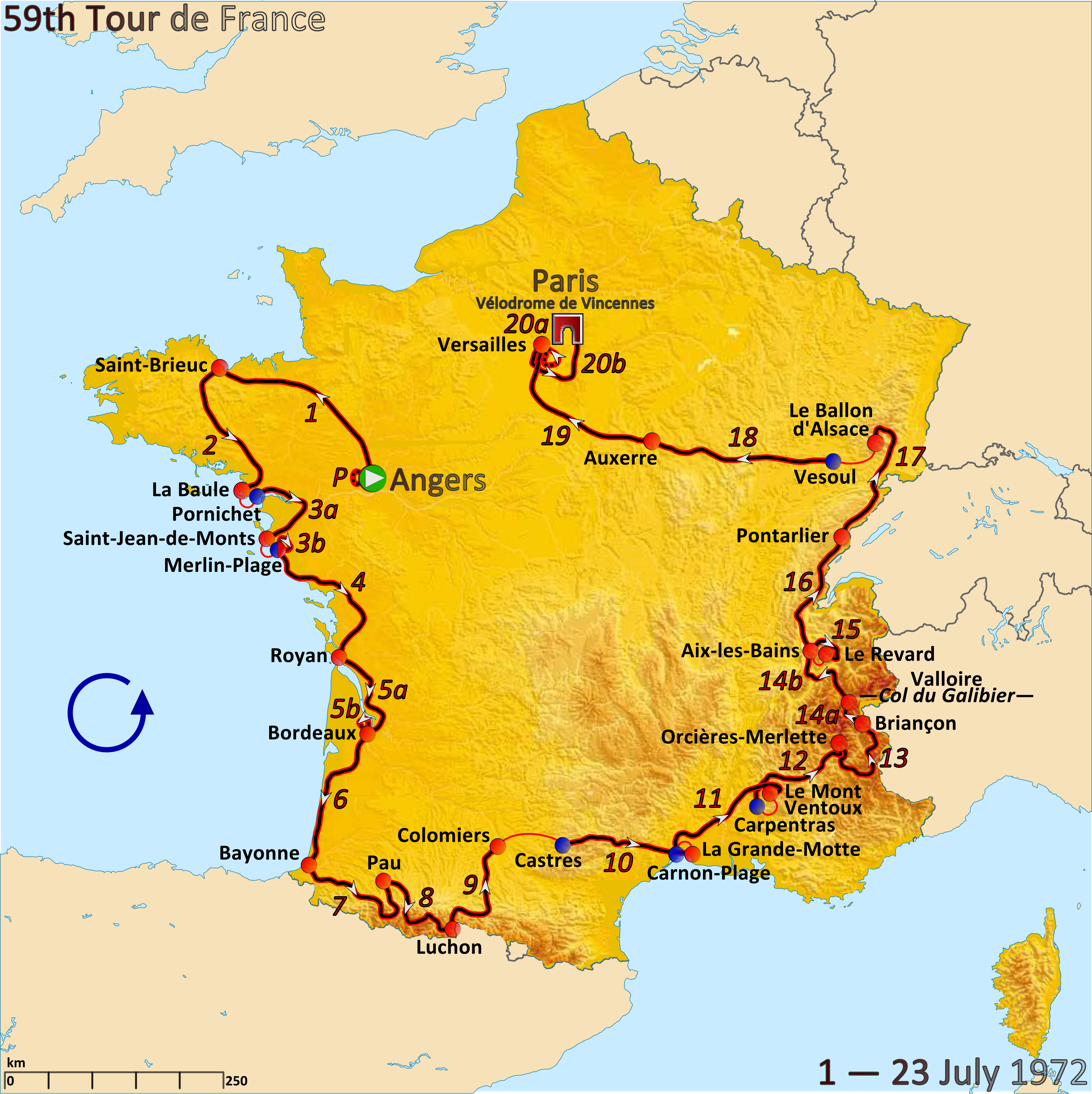
- Route of the 1972 Tour de France

Race details
- Dates: 1–22 July 1972
- Stages: 20 + Prologue, including four split stages
- Distance: 3,846 km (2,390 mi)
- Winning time: 108h 17' 18"

Results
Jersey awarded to the overall winner	Winner	Eddy Merckx (BEL)	(Molteni)
	Second	Felice Gimondi (ITA)	(Salvarani)
	Third	Raymond Poulidor (FRA)	(Gan–Mercier–Hutchinson)
Jersey awarded to the points classification winner	Points	Eddy Merckx (BEL)	(Molteni)
	Mountains	Lucien Van Impe (BEL)	(Sonolor–Lejeune)
Jersey awarded to the combination classification winner	Combination	Eddy Merckx (BEL)	(Molteni)
	Sprints	Willy Teirlinck (BEL)	(Sonolor–Lejeune)
	Combativity	Cyrille Guimard (FRA)	(Gan–Mercier–Hutchinson)
	Team	Gan–Mercier–Hutchinson	

The 1972 Tour de France was the 59th edition of the Tour de France, one of cycling's Grand Tours. It took place from 1 to 22 July, with 20 stages covering a distance of 3,846 km (2,390 mi). After riding strongly in the first two weeks of the race and being the closest GC contender to Eddy Merckx, Luis Ocaña crashed, in the Pyrenees, leaving Merckx to battle Cyrille Guimard for the win. Guimard, having won four stages, had to leave the race after stage 17 in second place (he already was 7:58 behind at that point), but was given the combativity award after the race.

== Teams ==
The 1972 Tour started with 12 teams, each with 11 cyclists, a total of 132.

The teams entering the race were:

- Molteni
- Beaulieu–Flandria
- Sonolor–Lejeune
- Peugeot–BP–Michelin
- Van Cauter–Magniflex–de Gribaldy
- Bic
- Gan–Mercier–Hutchinson
- Rokado–Colders
- Salvarani
- Goudsmit–Hoff
- Gitane
- Watney–Avia

== Pre-race favourites ==
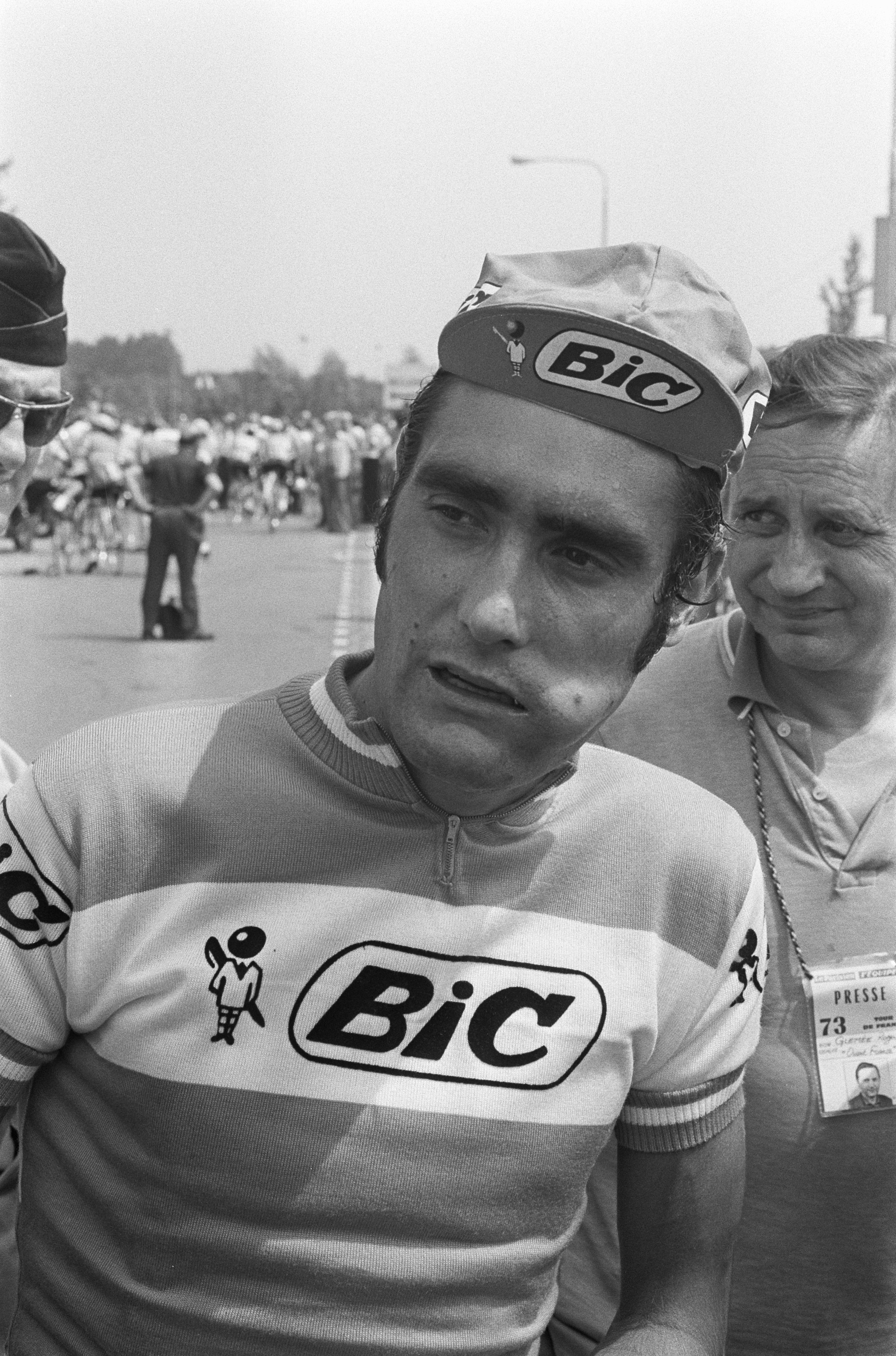
Luis Ocaña in (pictured at the 1973 Tour) returned after crashing out in the previous Tour whilst wearing the race leader's yellow jersey.

In the previous year, Luis Ocaña was on his way to beat Eddy Merckx, when he fell as leader and had to give up. Everybody expected Merckx and Ocana to battle for the victory in 1972. Ocana felt that he could have won the 1971 Tour, and Merckx did not like the comments that he did not deserve the 1971 victory, and both wanted to show their strengths. Merckx had won important races before the Tour started, including the 1972 Giro d'Italia, and was also the reigning world champion. Ocana had won less races, but won the Criterium du Dauphiné Libéré. The most important other participants were considered Raymond Poulidor, Felice Gimondi, Joop Zoetemelk and Bernard Thévenet.

José Manuel Fuente, who had won the 1972 Vuelta a España and finished second in the 1972 Giro d'Italia, did not compete, as his team decided they had already been in too many hard races. Herman Van Springel had announced four days prior to the Tour that he would leave his team after his contract would end at the end of 1972. His team then removed him from the Tour squad.

== Route and stages ==
For the first time since 1947, the Tour de France was entirely in France. The highest point of elevation in the race was 2,556 m (8,386 ft) at the summit tunnel of the Col du Galibier mountain pass on stage 14a.

Three days before the Tour started on 1 July, the schedule was changed: the final time trial was split, with the first 42 km as a time trial in the morning, and the last 89 km as a mass-start stage in the afternoon. There were two rest days, in Bayonne and Orcières.

Stage characteristics and winners
Stage	Date	Course	Distance	Type	Winner
P	1 July	Angers	7.2 km (4.5 mi)	Individual time trial	Eddy Merckx (BEL)
1	2 July	Angers to Saint-Brieuc	235.5 km (146.3 mi)	Plain stage	Cyrille Guimard (FRA)
2	3 July	Saint-Brieuc to La Baule	206.5 km (128.3 mi)	Plain stage	Rik Van Linden (BEL)
3a	4 July	Pornichet to Saint-Jean-de-Monts	161.0 km (100.0 mi)	Plain stage	Ercole Gualazzini (ITA)
3b	4 July	Merlin-Plage	16.2 km (10.1 mi)	Team time trial	(Italy) Molteni
4	5 July	Merlin-Plage to Royan	236.0 km (146.6 mi)	Plain stage	Cyrille Guimard (FRA)
5a	6 July	Royan to Bordeaux	133.5 km (83.0 mi)	Plain stage	Walter Godefroot (BEL)
5b	6 July	Bordeaux	12.7 km (7.9 mi)	Individual time trial	Eddy Merckx (BEL)
6	7 July	Bordeaux to Bayonne	205.0 km (127.4 mi)	Plain stage	Leo Duyndam (NED)
	8 July	Bayonne		Rest day	
7	9 July	Bayonne to Pau	220.5 km (137.0 mi)	Stage with mountain(s)	Yves Hézard (FRA)
8	10 July	Pau to Luchon	163.5 km (101.6 mi)	Stage with mountain(s)	Eddy Merckx (BEL)
9	11 July	Luchon to Colomiers	179.0 km (111.2 mi)	Hilly stage	Jos Huysmans (BEL)
10	12 July	Castres to La Grande-Motte	210.0 km (130.5 mi)	Plain stage	Willy Teirlinck (BEL)
11	13 July	Carnon-Plage to Mont Ventoux	207.0 km (128.6 mi)	Stage with mountain(s)	Bernard Thévenet (FRA)
12	14 July	Carpentras to Orcières-Merlette	192.0 km (119.3 mi)	Stage with mountain(s)	Lucien Van Impe (BEL)
	15 July	Orcières-Merlette		Rest day	
13	16 July	Orcières-Merlette to Briançon	201.0 km (124.9 mi)	Stage with mountain(s)	Eddy Merckx (BEL)
14a	17 July	Briançon to Valloire	51.0 km (31.7 mi)	Stage with mountain(s)	Eddy Merckx (BEL)
14b	17 July	Valloire to Aix-les-Bains	151.0 km (93.8 mi)	Stage with mountain(s)	Cyrille Guimard (FRA)
15	18 July	Aix-les-Bains to Le Revard	28.0 km (17.4 mi)	Stage with mountain(s)	Cyrille Guimard (FRA)
16	19 July	Aix-les-Bains to Pontarlier	198.5 km (123.3 mi)	Hilly stage	Willy Teirlinck (BEL)
17	20 July	Pontarlier to Ballon d'Alsace	213.0 km (132.4 mi)	Hilly stage	Bernard Thévenet (FRA)
18	21 July	Vesoul to Auxerre	257.5 km (160.0 mi)	Plain stage	Marinus Wagtmans (NED)
19	22 July	Auxerre to Versailles	230.0 km (142.9 mi)	Plain stage	Joseph Bruyère (BEL)
20a	23 July	Versailles	42.0 km (26.1 mi)	Individual time trial	Eddy Merckx (BEL)
20b	23 July	Versailles to Paris	89.0 km (55.3 mi)	Plain stage	Willy Teirlinck (BEL)
	Total		3,846 km (2,390 mi)		

== Race overview ==
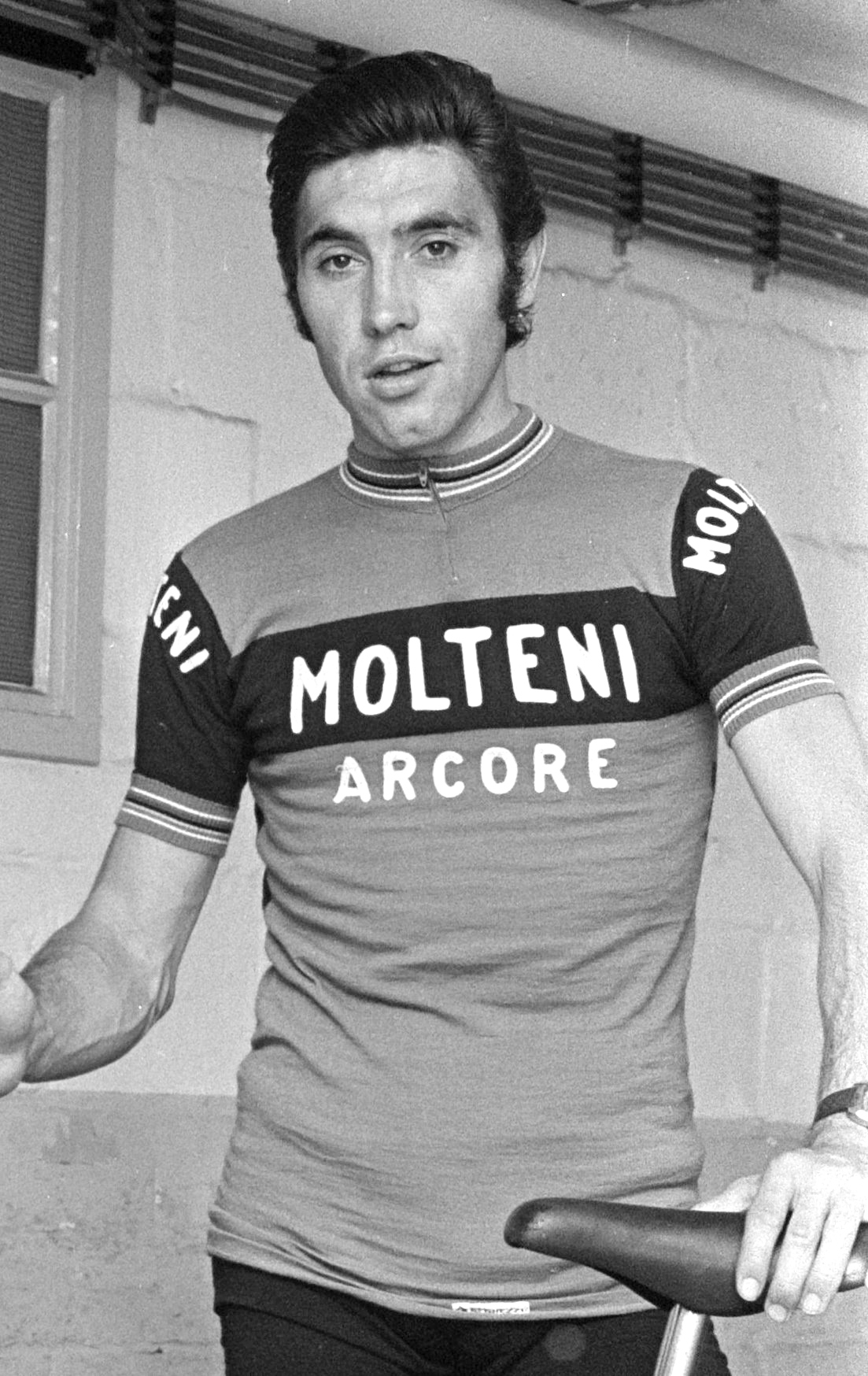
Eddy Merckx (pictured in 1973), winner of the general classification, his fourth

Merckx won the prologue, beating his rivals by some seconds. In the first stage, Cyrille Guimard won the sprint, and because of the bonification seconds took over the leader's jersey in the general classification. In the next stages, Merckx tried to win back time by winning bonification seconds in intermediate sprints and at the finish, but Guimard used the same tactic. Merckx won back the first position thanks to the bonification seconds after the team time trial in stage 3b, but lost it again in the fourth stage. Merckx won the time trial in the second part of the fifth stage, but Guimard came third, retaining the lead. After the sixth stage, Guimard was 11 seconds ahead of Merckx. The third place was occupied by a teammate of Merckx, and Ocaña was in fourth place, one minute behind Guimard.

In the seventh stage, the Tour reached the Pyrenees. Ocaña attacked two times, and the second time only Merckx could follow. When Ocaña punctured, and later crashed with Thevenet, Merckx was away without him. Another group, including Zoetemelk and Guimard, had reached Merckx, and crossed the finish line together. Ocana finished in sixth place, losing 1 minute and 49 seconds. Thevenet lost more than six minutes that stage, and lost all hope of winning. He was taken to the hospital to see if the crash had caused serious injuries, but could start the next stage. In the eighth stage, Lucien Van Impe attacked on the last climb. Merckx caught him and won the stage, with Ocana only eight seconds behind him. Guimard lost three minutes, and Merckx overtook him in the general classification. In the ninth stage, Roger Pingeon left the race. He did not play an important role in the general classification, but his team expected him to help his teammate Thevenet in the rest of the race.

The eleventh stage ended with the climb up to Mont Ventoux. After Merckx' team had pushed the pace such that most cyclists in the peloton had dropped, Ocana attacked four times. Every time, Merckx was able to chase him, together with only Poulidor. Poulidor then attacked, but could not get away. Some other cyclists were able to get back, including Thevenet. Thevenet then attacked, and left the others behind, winning the stage.

Merckx expected Ocana to attack in the twelfth stage, so he stayed with him. When Joaquim Agostinho and Lucien Van Impe attacked, Merckx let them go and stayed with Ocana, as Merckx only cared about Ocana; he did not want Ocana to win back time, and did not want him to win the stage which could give him inspiration in the next stages. On the thirteenth stage, Merckx' team first set a pace that eliminated all but 16 cyclists at the start of the climb of the Vars. Raymond Delisle escaped from that group, but Merckx and Agostinho chased and passed him after the summit. On the way down, Guimard was able to catch Merckx, who had dropped Delisle and Agostinho. Climbing the Izoard, Merckx dropped Guimard, and soloed to the victory. By then, Merckx was leading the general classification firmly, almost five minutes ahead of Ocana.

The first part of the fourteenth stage was also won by Merckx, who outsprinted Zoetemelk. Ocana lost two minutes, and Guimard overtook him in the general classification. In the second part of the fourteenth stage, Ocana lost more than five minutes. Guimard and Merckx sprinted for the stage victory, and the photo finish gave the victory to Guimard. Ocana left the race after that stage; he had contracted a lung infection after his fall in the seventh stage. The stage ended with two laps of 1800 m; when it was found out that one group had missed one lap, the rules said that this group would have to ride that lap again, but the jury decided to use the times clocked after the first lap.

The fifteenth stage was also narrowly won by Guimard; Merckx had already raised one hand to cheer. In the seventeenth stage, Guimard struggled with his health. He needed medical attention during the entire stage, and lost two minutes on the final climb. After 10 km in the eighteenth stage, he left the race.

Merckx was now leading by more than ten minutes, and was certain to win the race. The second place was still not certain; Poulidor and Gimondi were separated only by one second. In the time trial on the last day, won by Merckx, the decision fell: Gimondi came in second, Poulidor fourth, and Gimondi overtook Poulidor in the general classification. After the finish in Paris, Merckx gave the green jersey that he received for winning the points classification to Guimard, who otherwise would have been the winner of that classification.

=== Doping ===
Guimard had been treated by Bernard Sainz. After Guimard left the race, there were rumours that Guimard had been using doping in the last days of the Tour; to end these rumours, he requested that after the eighteenth stage, he would also be checked for doping.

In 2000, Sainz wrote the book "The stunning revelation of Dr. Mabuse", where he denied that he was responsible.

Later that year, Eddy Merckx finished second in the athlete of the year poll, behind Mark Spitz.

== Classification leadership and minor prizes ==
There were several classifications in the 1972 Tour de France, three of them awarding jerseys to their leaders. The most important was the general classification, calculated by adding each cyclist's finishing times on each stage. The cyclist with the least accumulated time was the race leader, identified by the yellow jersey; the winner of this classification is considered the winner of the Tour.

Additionally, there was a points classification, where cyclists got points for finishing among the best in a stage finish, or in intermediate sprints. The cyclist with the most points lead the classification, and was identified with a green jersey.

There was also a mountains classification. The organisation had categorised some climbs as either first, second, third, or fourth-category; points for this classification were won by the first cyclists that reached the top of these climbs first, with more points available for the higher-categorised climbs. The cyclist with the most points lead the classification, but was not identified with a jersey in 1972.

Another classification was the combination classification. This classification was calculated as a combination of the other classifications, its leader wore the white jersey.

The fifth individual classification was the intermediate sprints classification. This classification had similar rules as the points classification, but only points were awarded on intermediate sprints. In 1972, this classification had no associated jersey.

For the team classification, the times of the best three cyclists per team on each stage were added; the leading team was the team with the lowest total time. The riders in the team that led this classification wore yellow caps.

In addition, there was a combativity award, in which a jury composed of journalists gave points after mass-start stages to the cyclist they considered most combative. The split stages each had a combined winner. At the conclusion of the Tour, Cyrille Guimard won the overall super-combativity award, also decided by journalists. Three further daily individual awards were given for good humour, teamwork and elegance. Overall awards were given for these also, with Bernard Thévenet seen as the funniest, Martin Van Den Bossche the best teammate and Felice Gimondi the most elegant. The Souvenir Henri Desgrange was given to the first rider to pass the memorial to Tour founder Henri Desgrange near the summit of the Col du Galibier on stage 14a. This prize was won by Joop Zoetemelk.

Classification leadership by stage
Stage	Winner	General classification	Points classification	Mountains classification (Note: No jersey was awarded to the leader of the mountains classification until a white jersey with red polka dots was introduced in 1975.)	Combination classification	Intermediate sprints classification	Team classification	Combativity award
P	Eddy Merckx	Eddy Merckx	Eddy Merckx	no award	no award	no award	Molteni	no award
1	Cyrille Guimard	Cyrille Guimard	Cyrille Guimard	Cyrille Guimard	Cyrille Guimard	Cyrille Guimard	Molteni	Cyrille Guimard
2	Rik Van Linden	Cyrille Guimard	Cyrille Guimard	Cyrille Guimard	Cyrille Guimard	Cyrille Guimard	Molteni	Edward Janssens
3a	Ercole Gualazzini	Cyrille Guimard	Cyrille Guimard	Cyrille Guimard	Cyrille Guimard	Cyrille Guimard	Molteni	Joop Zoetemelk
3b	Molteni	Eddy Merckx	Cyrille Guimard	Cyrille Guimard	Cyrille Guimard	Cyrille Guimard	Molteni	Joop Zoetemelk
4	Cyrille Guimard	Cyrille Guimard	Cyrille Guimard	Cyrille Guimard	Cyrille Guimard	Cyrille Guimard	Peugeot–BP–Michelin	Gerard Vianen
5a	Walter Godefroot	Cyrille Guimard	Cyrille Guimard	Cyrille Guimard	Cyrille Guimard	Cyrille Guimard	Peugeot–BP–Michelin	Willy Teirlinck
5b	Eddy Merckx	Cyrille Guimard	Cyrille Guimard	Cyrille Guimard	Cyrille Guimard	Cyrille Guimard	Molteni	Willy Teirlinck
6	Leo Duyndam	Cyrille Guimard	Cyrille Guimard	Mathieu Pustjens	Cyrille Guimard	Cyrille Guimard	Molteni	Guy Santy
7	Yves Hézard	Cyrille Guimard	Cyrille Guimard	Wilfried David	Cyrille Guimard	Cyrille Guimard	Gan–Mercier–Hutchinson	Wilfried David
8	Eddy Merckx	Eddy Merckx	Cyrille Guimard	Eddy Merckx	Eddy Merckx	Cyrille Guimard	Gan–Mercier–Hutchinson	Lucien Van Impe
9	Jos Huysmans	Eddy Merckx	Cyrille Guimard	Eddy Merckx	Eddy Merckx	Cyrille Guimard	Gan–Mercier–Hutchinson	Christian Raymond
10	Willy Teirlinck	Eddy Merckx	Cyrille Guimard	Eddy Merckx	Eddy Merckx	Cyrille Guimard	Gan–Mercier–Hutchinson	Ronny Vanmarcke
11	Bernard Thévenet	Eddy Merckx	Cyrille Guimard	Eddy Merckx	Eddy Merckx	Cyrille Guimard	Gan–Mercier–Hutchinson	Luis Ocaña
12	Lucien Van Impe	Eddy Merckx	Cyrille Guimard	Lucien Van Impe	Eddy Merckx	Cyrille Guimard	Gan–Mercier–Hutchinson	Joaquim Agostinho
13	Eddy Merckx	Eddy Merckx	Cyrille Guimard	Eddy Merckx	Eddy Merckx	Cyrille Guimard	Gan–Mercier–Hutchinson	Luis Ocaña
14a	Eddy Merckx	Eddy Merckx	Cyrille Guimard	Eddy Merckx	Eddy Merckx	Cyrille Guimard	Gan–Mercier–Hutchinson	Raymond Delisle
14b	Cyrille Guimard	Eddy Merckx	Cyrille Guimard	Eddy Merckx	Eddy Merckx	Cyrille Guimard	Gan–Mercier–Hutchinson	Raymond Delisle
15	Cyrille Guimard	Eddy Merckx	Cyrille Guimard	Eddy Merckx	Eddy Merckx	Cyrille Guimard	Gan–Mercier–Hutchinson	Raymond Poulidor
16	Willy Teirlinck	Eddy Merckx	Cyrille Guimard	Lucien Van Impe	Eddy Merckx	Cyrille Guimard	Gan–Mercier–Hutchinson	Leif Mortensen
17	Bernard Thévenet	Eddy Merckx	Cyrille Guimard	Lucien Van Impe	Eddy Merckx	Cyrille Guimard	Gan–Mercier–Hutchinson	Joaquim Agostinho
18	Marinus Wagtmans	Eddy Merckx	Eddy Merckx	Lucien Van Impe	Eddy Merckx	Willy Teirlinck	Gan–Mercier–Hutchinson	Rini Wagtmans
19	Joseph Bruyère	Eddy Merckx	Eddy Merckx	Lucien Van Impe	Eddy Merckx	Willy Teirlinck	Gan–Mercier–Hutchinson	Guy Santy
20a	Eddy Merckx	Eddy Merckx	Eddy Merckx	Lucien Van Impe	Eddy Merckx	Willy Teirlinck	Gan–Mercier–Hutchinson	Alain Bellouis
20b	Willy Teirlinck	Eddy Merckx	Eddy Merckx	Lucien Van Impe	Eddy Merckx	Willy Teirlinck	Gan–Mercier–Hutchinson	Alain Bellouis
Final		Eddy Merckx	Eddy Merckx	Lucien Van Impe	Eddy Merckx	Willy Teirlinck	Gan–Mercier–Hutchinson	Cyrille Guimard

== Final standings ==
Legend
A yellow jersey.	Denotes the winner of the general classification	A green jersey.	Denotes the winner of the points classification
A white jersey.	Denotes the winner of the combination classification		

=== General classification ===
Final general classification (1–10)
Rank	Rider	Team	Time
1	Eddy Merckx (BEL)	Molteni	108h 17' 18"
2	Felice Gimondi (ITA)	Salvarani	+ 10' 41"
3	Raymond Poulidor (FRA)	Gan–Mercier–Hutchinson	+ 11' 34"
4	Lucien Van Impe (BEL)	Sonolor–Lejeune	+ 16' 45"
5	Joop Zoetemelk (NED)	Beaulieu–Flandria	+ 19' 09"
6	Mariano Martinez (FRA)	Van Cauter–Magniflex–de Gribaldy	+ 21' 31"
7	Yves Hézard (FRA)	Sonolor–Lejeune	+ 21' 52"
8	Joaquim Agostinho (POR)	Van Cauter–Magniflex–de Gribaldy	+ 34' 16"
9	Bernard Thévenet (FRA)	Peugeot–BP–Michelin	+ 37' 11"
10	Ward Janssens (BEL)	Van Cauter–Magniflex–de Gribaldy	+ 42' 33"

Final general classification (11–88)
Rank	Rider	Team	Time
11	Raymond Delisle (FRA)	Peugeot–BP–Michelin	+ 46' 27"
12	Leif Mortensen (DEN)	Bic	+ 46' 39"
13	Antoon Houbrechts (BEL)	Salvarani	+ 47' 37"
14	Roger Swerts (BEL)	Molteni	+ 49' 24"
15	Martin Vandenbossche (BEL)	Molteni	+ 59' 29"
16	Frans Verbeeck (BEL)	Watney–Avia	+ 1h 00' 09"
17	Lucien Aimar (FRA)	Rokado–Colders	+ 1h 03' 41"
18	Tino Tabak (NED)	Goudsmit–Hoff	+ 1h 05' 09"
19	Michel Périn (FRA)	Gan–Mercier–Hutchinson	+ 1h 06' 19"
20	Karl-Heinz Kunde (FRG)	Rokado–Colders	+ 1h 10' 09"
21	Jean-Pierre Danguillaume (FRA)	Peugeot–BP–Michelin	+ 1h 14' 51"
22	Jos Deschoenmaecker (BEL)	Molteni	+ 1h 21' 28"
23	Herman Beysens (BEL)	Van Cauter–Magniflex–de Gribaldy	+ 1h 23' 51"
24	Rolf Wolfshohl (FRG)	Rokado–Colders	+ 1h 24' 59"
25	Mathieu Pustjens (NED)	Sonolor–Lejeune	+ 1h 26' 33"
26	Joseph Bruyère (BEL)	Molteni	+ 1h 27' 20"
27	Walter Ricci (FRA)	Sonolor–Lejeune	+ 1h 30' 12"
28	Joseph Huysmans (BEL)	Molteni	+ 1h 31' 29"
29	Guy Santy (FRA)	Bic	+ 1h 31' 35"
30	Johny Schleck (LUX)	Bic	+ 1h 32' 06"
31	Ronald De Witte (BEL)	Peugeot–BP–Michelin	+ 1h 34' 22"
32	Joël Millard (FRA)	Van Cauter–Magniflex–de Gribaldy	+ 1h 37' 28"
33	Willy Vanneste (BEL)	Beaulieu–Flandria	+ 1h 39' 11"
34	Gilbert Bellone (FRA)	Rokado–Colders	+ 1h 39' 39"
35	Sylvain Vasseur (FRA)	Bic	+ 1h 41' 13"
36	Gérard Moneyron (FRA)	Gan–Mercier–Hutchinson	+ 1h 41' 46"
37	Frans Mintjens (BEL)	Molteni	+ 1h 42' 55"
38	Jean-Pierre Parenteau (FRA)	Peugeot–BP–Michelin	+ 1h 44' 20"
39	Primo Mori (ITA)	Salvarani	+ 1h 44' 54"
40	Roland Berland (FRA)	Bic	+ 1h 45' 51"
41	Wilfried David (BEL)	Peugeot–BP–Michelin	+ 1h 48' 53"
42	Dieter Puschel (FRG)	Rokado–Colders	+ 1h 50' 12"
43	Marc Lievens (BEL)	Molteni	+ 1h 50' 44"
44	Walter Godefroot (BEL)	Peugeot–BP–Michelin	+ 1h 53' 56"
45	Jurgen Tschan (FRG)	Peugeot–BP–Michelin	+ 1h 56' 00"
46	Jean-Claude Largeau (FRA)	Van Cauter–Magniflex–de Gribaldy	+ 1h 59' 41"
47	Christian Raymond (FRA)	Peugeot–BP–Michelin	+ 2h 01' 00"
48	Raymond Riotte (FRA)	Sonolor–Lejeune	+ 2h 01' 25"
49	Ludo Van Staeyen (BEL)	Van Cauter–Magniflex–de Gribaldy	+ 2h 02' 41"
50	Georges Chappe (FRA)	Gitane	+ 2h 02' 44"
51	Willy In' t Ven (BEL)	Molteni	+ 2h 03' 11"
52	Karl-Heinz Muddemann (FRG)	Rokado–Colders	+ 2h 04' 04"
53	Giacinto Santambrogio (ITA)	Salvarani	+ 2h 04' 07"
54	Marinus Wagtmans (NED)	Goudsmit–Hoff	+ 2h 04' 45"
55	Michael Wright (GBR)	Gitane	+ 2h 08' 31"
56	Jesus Aranzabal (ESP)	Bic	+ 2h 10' 44"
57	René Grenier (FRA)	Gitane	+ 2h 11' 29"
58	Jacky Mourioux (FRA)	Gan–Mercier–Hutchinson	+ 2h 11' 37"
59	Gérard David (BEL)	Beaulieu–Flandria	+ 2h 11' 53"
60	Gerben Karstens (NED)	Rokado–Colders	+ 2h 12' 40"
61	Wim Prinsen (NED)	Goudsmit–Hoff	+ 2h 14' 56"
62	Ronny Van Marcke (BEL)	Beaulieu–Flandria	+ 2h 16' 34"
63	Wilfried Peffgen (FRG)	Rokado–Colders	+ 2h 16' 49"
64	Jean-Claude Genty (FRA)	Bic	+ 2h 16' 53"
65	Willy Abbeloos (BEL)	Van Cauter–Magniflex–de Gribaldy	+ 2h 18' 22"
66	Willy Teirlinck (BEL)	Sonolor–Lejeune	+ 2h 21' 59"
67	Eddy Verstraeten (BEL)	Watney–Avia	+ 2h 22' 57"
68	Marc Sohet (BEL)	Watney–Avia	+ 2h 26' 20"
69	Paul Aerts (BEL)	Watney–Avia	+ 2h 27' 39"
70	Barry Hoban (GBR)	Gan–Mercier–Hutchinson	+ 2h 28' 20"
71	Gerard Vianen (NED)	Goudsmit–Hoff	+ 2h 28' 27"
72	Jean-Claude Daunat (FRA)	Gitane	+ 2h 30' 06"
73	Jos van der Vleuten (NED)	Goudsmit–Hoff	+ 2h 30' 41"
74	Pietro Campagnari (ITA)	Salvarani	+ 2h 31' 42"
75	Pierre Matignon (FRA)	Gitane	+ 2h 33' 10"
76	Régis Delépine (FRA)	Gan–Mercier–Hutchinson	+ 2h 36' 32"
77	Noël Vanclooster (BEL)	Watney–Avia	+ 2h 38' 24"
78	Jan Krekels (NED)	Goudsmit–Hoff	+ 2h 38' 59"
79	Pieter Nassen (BEL)	Watney–Avia	+ 2h 40' 52"
80	Rik Van Linden (BEL)	Van Cauter–Magniflex–de Gribaldy	+ 2h 41' 24"
81	Bernard Guyot (FRA)	Sonolor–Lejeune	+ 2h 41' 29"
82	Marino Basso (ITA)	Salvarani	+ 2h 46' 50"
83	Evert Dolman (NED)	Beaulieu–Flandria	+ 2h 48' 36"
84	Léon-Paul Ménard (FRA)	Gitane	+ 2h 48' 41"
85	Luigi Castelletti (ITA)	Salvarani	+ 2h 50' 12"
86	Pietro Guerra (ITA)	Salvarani	+ 2h 54' 37"
87	Robert Mintkiewicz (FRA)	Sonolor–Lejeune	+ 3h 07' 39"
88	Alain Bellouis (FRA)	Gitane	+ 4h 03' 33"

=== Points classification ===
Final points classification (1–10) (Note: When Cyrille Guimard left the race in the 17th stage, he was leading the points classification with 228 points.)
Rank	Rider	Team	Points
1	Eddy Merckx (BEL)	Molteni	197
2	Rik Van Linden (BEL)	Van Cauter–Magniflex–de Gribaldy	135
3	Joop Zoetemelk (NED)	Beaulieu–Flandria	133
4	Raymond Poulidor (FRA)	Gan–Mercier–Hutchinson	122
5	Frans Verbeeck (BEL)	Watney–Avia	118
6	Felice Gimondi (ITA)	Salvarani	112
7	Marino Basso (ITA)	Salvarani	112
8	Willy Teirlinck (BEL)	Sonolor–Lejeune	110
9	Lucien Van Impe (BEL)	Sonolor–Lejeune	105
10	Mariano Martinez (FRA)	Van Cauter–Magniflex–de Gribaldy	89

=== Mountains classification ===
Final mountains classification (1–10)
Rank	Rider	Team	Points
1	Lucien Van Impe (BEL)	Sonolor–Lejeune	229
2	Eddy Merckx (BEL)	Molteni	211
3	Joaquim Agostinho (POR)	Van Cauter–Magniflex–de Gribaldy	138
4	Mathieu Pustjens (NED)	Sonolor–Lejeune	109
5	Joop Zoetemelk (NED)	Beaulieu–Flandria	104
6	Raymond Poulidor (FRA)	Gan–Mercier–Hutchinson	79
7	Raymond Delisle (FRA)	Peugeot–BP–Michelin	55
8	Bernard Thévenet (FRA)	Peugeot–BP–Michelin	49
9	Mariano Martinez (FRA)	Van Cauter–Magniflex–de Gribaldy	43
10	Roger Swerts (BEL)	Molteni	35

=== Combination classification ===
Final combination classification (1–9)
Rank	Rider	Team	Points
1	Eddy Merckx (BEL)	Molteni	4
2	Raymond Poulidor (FRA)	Gan–Mercier–Hutchinson	13
3	Joop Zoetemelk (NED)	Beaulieu–Flandria	13
4	Lucien Van Impe (BEL)	Sonolor–Lejeune	14
5	Felice Gimondi (ITA)	Salvarani	19
6	Mariano Martinez (FRA)	Van Cauter–Magniflex–de Gribaldy	25
7	Joaquim Agostinho (POR)	Van Cauter–Magniflex–de Gribaldy	26
8	Yves Hézard (FRA)	Sonolor–Lejeune	34.5
9	Leif Mortensen (DEN)	Bic	42.5

=== Intermediate sprints classification ===
Final intermediate sprints classification (1–10) (Note: When Cyrille Guimard left the race in the 17th stage, he was leading the intermediate sprints classification with 65 points.)
Rank	Rider	Team	Points
1	Willy Teirlinck (BEL)	Sonolor–Lejeune	61
2	Robert Mintkiewicz (FRA)	Sonolor–Lejeune	48
3	Barry Hoban (GBR)	Gan–Mercier–Hutchinson	28
4	Giacinto Santambrogio (ITA)	Salvarani	28
5	Raymond Riotte (FRA)	Sonolor–Lejeune	27
6	Eddy Merckx (BEL)	Molteni	16
7	Gerben Karstens (NED)	Rokado–Colders	15
8	Joop Zoetemelk (NED)	Beaulieu–Flandria	13
9	Jos van der Vleuten (NED)	Goudsmit–Hoff	10
10	Joaquim Agostinho (POR)	Van Cauter–Magniflex–de Gribaldy	9

=== Team classification ===
Final team classification (1–10)
Rank	Team	Time
1	Gan–Mercier–Hutchinson	327h 44' 34"
2	Van Cauter–Magniflex–de Gribaldy	+ 8' 29"
3	Molteni	+ 12' 45"
4	Sonolor–Lejeune	+ 17' 45"
5	Bic	+ 46' 09"
6	Salvarani	+ 56' 27"
7	Peugeot–BP–Michelin	+ 58' 46"
8	Beaulieu–Flandria	+ 1h 43' 13"
9	Rokado–Colders	+ 3h 21' 13"
10	Goudsmit–Hoff	+ 3h 21' 13"

== Bibliography ==
- Augendre, Jacques (2016). "Guide historique" [Historical guide] (PDF). Tour de France (in French). Paris: Amaury Sport Organisation. Archived (PDF) from the original on 17 August 2016.
- Duniecq, Jacques (1972). 1972 Tour de France. Keighley, UK: Kennedy Brothers Publishing. OCLC 10318940.
- McGann, Bill; McGann, Carol (2008). The Story of the Tour de France: 1965–2007. Vol. 2. Indianapolis: Dog Ear Publishing. ISBN 978-1-59858-608-4.
- Nauright, John; Parrish, Charles (2012). Sports Around the World: History, Culture, and Practice. Vol. 2. Santa Barbara, California: ABC-CLIO. ISBN 978-1-59884-300-2.
- van den Akker, Pieter (2018). Tour de France Rules and Statistics: 1903–2018. Self-published. ISBN 978-1-79398-080-9.
