= Paris–Bourges =

French one-day road cycling race

Race details
- Date: Early October
- Region: Centre, France
- English name: Paris–Bourges
- Local name: Paris–Bourges (in French)
- Discipline: Road
- Competition: UCI Europe Tour
- Type: Single-day
- Web site: www.parisbourges.fr

History
- First edition: 1913
- Editions: 68 (as of 2023)
- First winner: René Pichon (FRA)
- Most wins: 2 wins: Marcel Dussault (FRA); Daniele Nardello (ITA); John Degenkolb (GER); Sam Bennett (IRL)
- Most recent: Arnaud Démare (FRA)

Paris–Bourges is a French road bicycle race. The race originally started in Paris and ran to the town of Bourges in the Région Centre. However, in recent year with the length of races shortened it has become impossible to link the two cities and since 1996 the race has started in the town of Gien in the Loiret department which is 130 kilometres (80 miles) south of Paris. The official name of the race is now Paris-Gien-Bourges although it is still referred to as Paris–Bourges on the UCI calendar and throughout much of the media.

The first race was run in 1913, and won by René Pichon and it has been an annual event since 1990. Since 1949, it has been for professionals, after previously being an amateur race. It is held as a 1.1 event in the UCI Europe Tour. It previously featured as the last of the French Road Cycling Cup series of races.

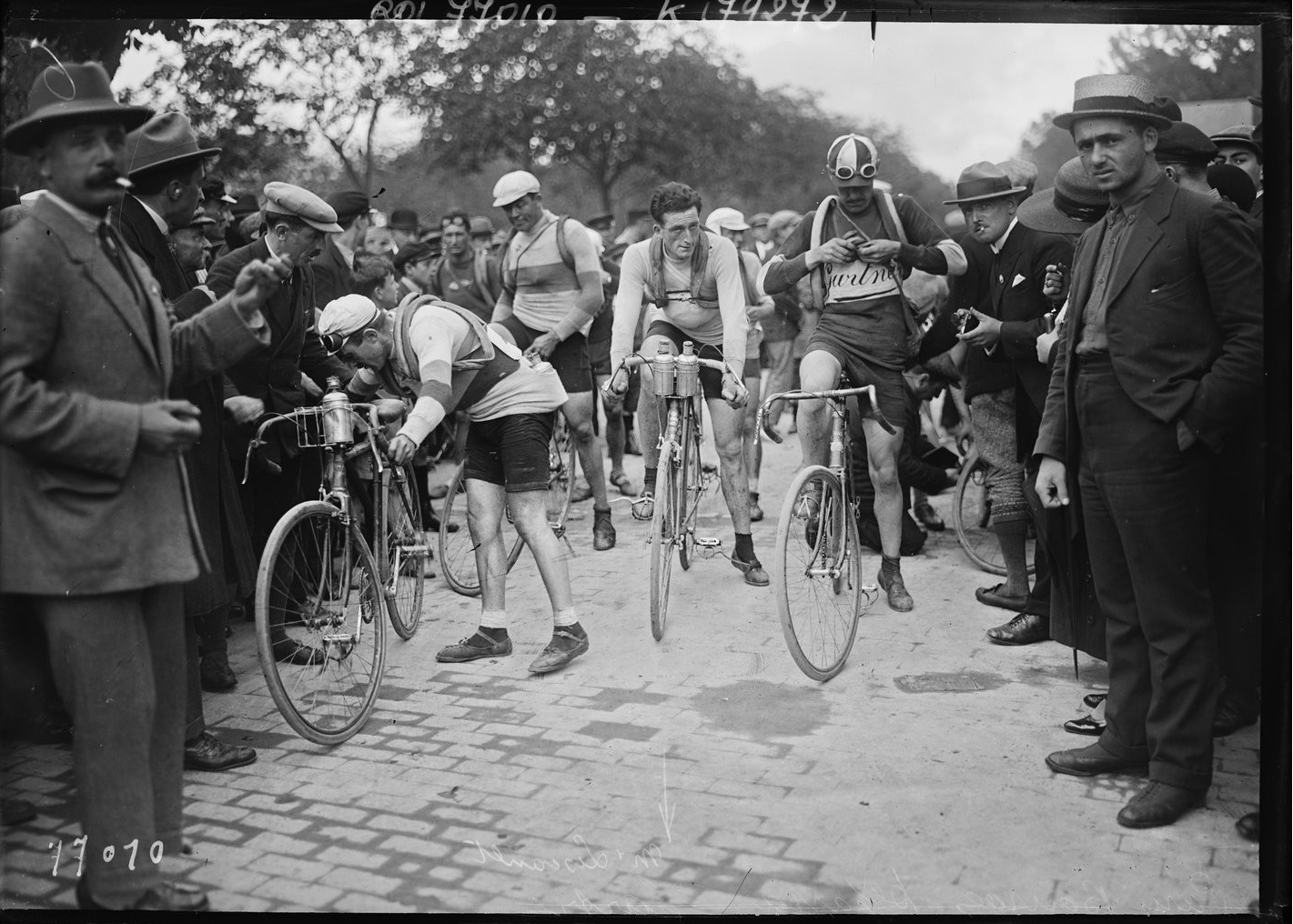
6 August 1922: Paris–Bourges departure in Chartres

The race did not take place in 2024 due to financial problems but returned to the calendar on September 13 2025 as a race for non-professionals over a distance of 165 kms with points counting towards the Coupe de France N1.

== The route ==
The modern version of the race takes place over a distance of approximately 190 km with the middle part climbing the hills of the Sancerrois region including the three classified climbs of the Cote de Jars (324 metres), Cote de Graveron (337 metres) and La Chapelotte (378 metres), these climbs decide the mountains prize. Because of their modest height and distance from the finish (La Chapelotte is 35 km from the finish), these hills very rarely have a decisive effect on the race. The race usually concludes with a bunch sprint on the Boulevard de la République in Bourges. Only two riders have won solo in recent editions and denied the sprinters, these were Thomas Voeckler (2006) and Florian Vachon in 2012.

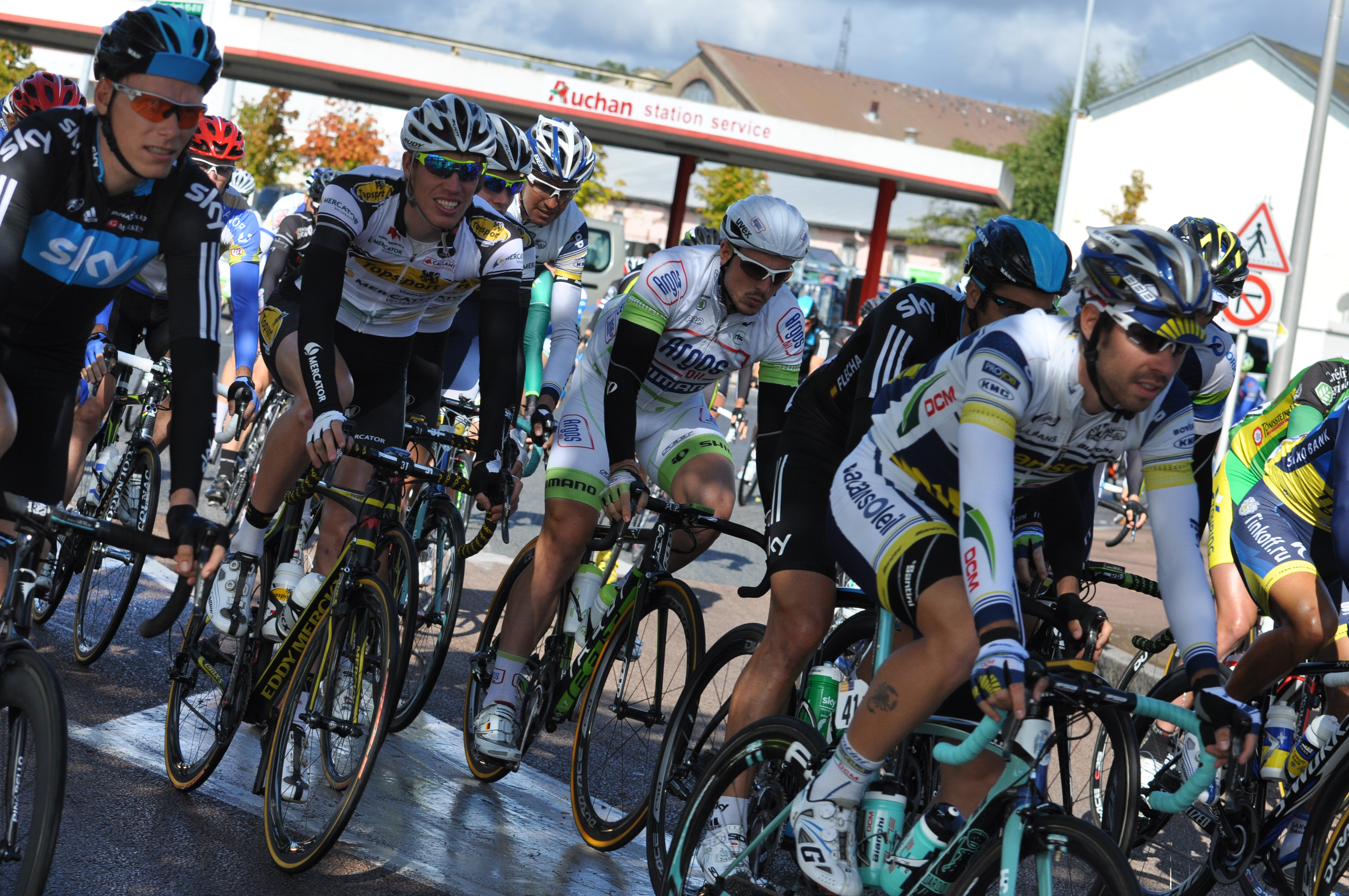
4 October 2012: Paris–Gien–Bourges race

== Winners ==
Year	Country	Rider	Team
1913	France	René Pichon	individual
1914– 1916	No race		
1917	Belgium	Charles Juseret	individual
1918– 1921	No race		
1922	France	Marcel Godard	individual
1923	France	Jean Brunier	J.B. Louvet-Soly
1924	France	Marcel Bidot	La Française–Diamant–Dunlop
1925	France	Gaston Deschamps	individual
1926– 1946	No race		
1947	France	Albert Bourlon	Peugeot–Dunlop
1948	France	Marcel Dussault	Stella–Dunlop
1949	France	Marcel Dussault	Stella–Dunlop
1950	France	Amand Audaire	Gitane–Hutchinson
1951	France	Jean-Marie Goasmat	Helyett–Hutchinson
1952	France	Stanislas Bober	Alcyon–Dunlop
1953	France	Robert Varnajo	Gitane–Hutchinson
1954	France	Jean Stablinski	Gitane–Hutchinson
1955	France	Jean-Marie Cieleska	Gitane–Hutchinson
1956	France	Joseph Morvan	Arrow–Hutchinson
1957	France	Raymond Guegan	Essor–Leroux
1958– 1970	No race		
1971	France	Walter Ricci	Sonolor–Lejeune
1972	France	Cyrille Guimard	Gan–Mercier–Hutchinson
1973	France	Roland Berland	Bic
1974	Great Britain	Barry Hoban	Gan–Mercier–Hutchinson
1975	France	Jean-Pierre Danguillaume	Peugeot–BP–Michelin
1976	France	Jean-Luc Molinéris	Peugeot–Esso–Michelin
1977	France	Régis Delépine	Peugeot–Esso–Michelin
1978	France	Régis Ovion	Peugeot–Esso–Michelin
1979	France	Jean-René Bernaudeau	Renault–Gitane
1980	France	Yves Hézard	Peugeot–Esso–Michelin
1981	France	Francis Castaing	Peugeot–Esso–Michelin
1982	France	Didier Vanoverschelde	La Redoute–Motobécane
1983	Ireland	Stephen Roche	Peugeot–Shell–Michelin
1984	Ireland	Sean Kelly	Skil–Reydel
1985	Switzerland	Niki Rüttimann	La Vie Claire
1986	France	Dominique Lecrocq	Système U
1987	Denmark	Kim Andersen	Toshiba–Look
1988	France	Patrice Esnault	R.M.O.
1989	No race		
1990	France	Laurent Jalabert	Toshiba
1991	Soviet Union	Andrei Tchmil	S.E.F.B.–Saxon–Gan
1992	Belgium	Wilfried Nelissen	Panasonic–Sportlife
1993	France	Bruno Cornillet	Novemail–Histor–Laser Computer
1994	Denmark	Lars Michaelsen	Catavana–AS Corbeil–Essonnes–Cedico
1995	Italy	Daniele Nardello	Mapei–GB–Latexco
1996	Netherlands	Tristan Hoffman	TVM–Farm Frites
1997	France	Laurent Roux	TVM–Farm Frites
1998	Belgium	Ludo Dierckxsens	Lotto–Mobistar
1999	Italy	Daniele Nardello	Mapei–Quick-Step
2000	France	Laurent Brochard	Jean Delatour
2001	France	Florent Brard	Festina
2002	Denmark	Allan Johansen	Team Fakta
2003	Germany	Jens Voigt	Crédit Agricole
2004	France	Jérôme Pineau	Brioches La Boulangère
2005	Denmark	Lars Bak	Team CSC
2006	France	Thomas Voeckler	Bouygues Télécom
2007	France	Romain Feillu	Agritubel
2008	Austria	Bernhard Eisel	Team Columbia
2009	Germany	André Greipel	Team Columbia–HTC
2010	France	Anthony Ravard	Ag2r–La Mondiale
2011	Australia	Mathew Hayman	Team Sky
2012	France	Florian Vachon	Bretagne–Schuller
2013	Germany	John Degenkolb	Argos–Shimano
2014	Germany	John Degenkolb	Giant–Shimano
2015	Ireland	Sam Bennett	Bora–Argon 18
2016	Ireland	Sam Bennett	Bora–Argon 18
2017	France	Rudy Barbier	AG2R La Mondiale
2018	France	Valentin Madouas	Groupama–FDJ
2019	France	Marc Sarreau	Groupama–FDJ
2020	No race due to the COVID-19 pandemic		
2021	Belgium	Jordi Meeus	Bora–Hansgrohe
2022	Belgium	Jasper Philipsen	Alpecin–Deceuninck
2023	France	Arnaud Démare	Arkéa–Samsic
2024	No race		
2025	France	Louis Hardouin	Guidon Chalettois
