= Alain Bellouis =

French cyclist

Personal information
- Full name: Alain Bellouis
- Born: 28 July 1947 (age 79) Gif-sur-Yvette, France

Cycling career
- Sport: Cycling
- Discipline: Road
- Role: Rider

Alain Bellouis (born 28 July 1947) is a former French racing cyclist. He finished in last place in the 1972 Tour de France.
