= 1975 GP Ouest-France =

Race details
- Dates: 28 August 1975
- Stages: 1
- Distance: 205 km (127.4 mi)
- Winning time: 5h 13' 00"

Results
	Winner	Cyrille Guimard (FRA)
	Second	Jean-Pierre Danguillaume (FRA)
	Third	Alain Santy (FRA)

The 1975 GP Ouest-France was the 39th edition of the GP Ouest-France cycle race and was held on 28 August 1975. The race started and finished in Plouay. The race was won by Cyrille Guimard.

== General classification ==
Final general classification

Rank	Rider	Time
1	Cyrille Guimard (FRA)	5h 13' 00"
2	Jean-Pierre Danguillaume (FRA)	+ 55"
3	Alain Santy (FRA)	+ 1' 40"
4	Jean-Pierre Paranteau (FRA)	+ 1' 40"
5	André Corbeau (FRA)	+ 1' 45"
6	Régis Delépine (FRA)	+ 1' 45"
7	Charles Rouxel (FRA)	+ 1' 45"
8	Patrick Béon (FRA)	+ 1' 45"
9	Marcel Boishardy (FRA)	+ 1' 45"
10	Robert Bouloux (FRA)	+ 1' 45"
