= Cyrille Guimard =

French cyclist and commentator

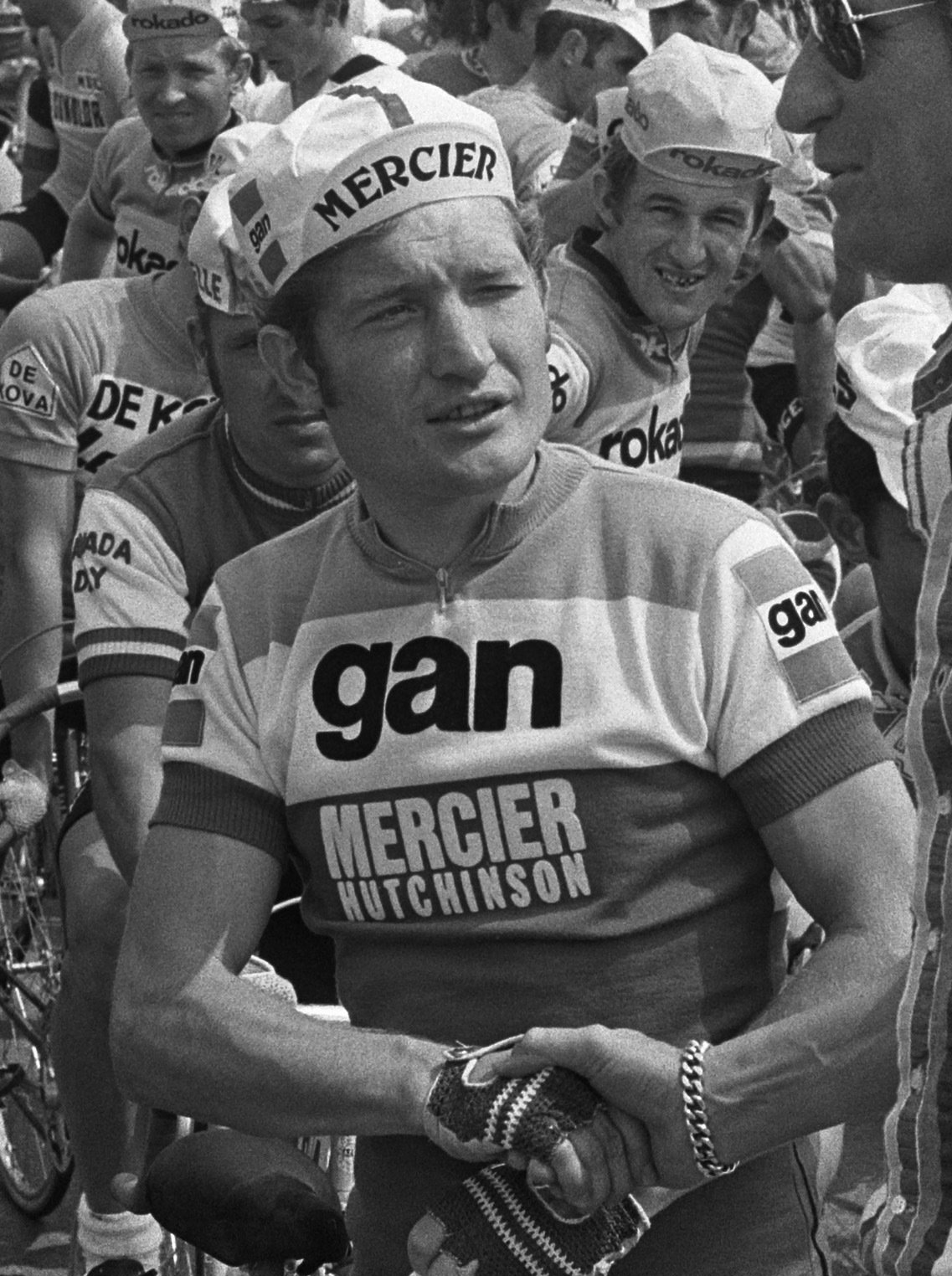
- Guimard at the 1973 Tour de France

Personal information
- Full name: Cyrille Guimard
- Nickname: Napoleon
- Born: 20 January 1947 (age 79) Bouguenais, France

Cycling career
- Sport: Cycling
- Disciplines: Road; Track; Cyclo-cross
- Role: Sprinter; All-rounder

Professional teams
- 1968–1973: Mercier–BP–Hutchinson
- 1974–1975: Carpenter–Confortluxe–Flandria
- 1976: Gitane–Campagnolo

Managerial teams
- 1976–1977: Gitane–Campagnolo
- 1978–1985: Renault–Gitane–Campagnolo
- 1986–1989: Système U
- 1990–1995: Castorama
- 1997: Cofidis
- 2003–2014: Vélo Club Roubaix
- 2017–2019: French national team

Major wins
- Grand Tours Tour de France 7 individual stages (1970, 1972, 1973, 1974) Vuelta a España Points classification (1971) Combination classification (1971) 2 individual stages (1971)
Medal record
Representing France
Men's road bicycle racing
World Championships
Bronze medal – third place	1971 Mendrisio	Road Race
Bronze medal – third place	1972 Gap	Road Race

Cyrille Guimard (born 20 January 1947) is a French former professional road racing cyclist who became a directeur sportif and television commentator. Three of his riders, Bernard Hinault, Laurent Fignon, and Lucien Van Impe, won the Tour de France. Another of his protégés, Greg LeMond, described him as "the best (coach) in the world" and "the best coach I ever had". He has been described by cycling journalist William Fotheringham as the greatest directeur sportif in the history of the Tour.

== Riding career ==
Born in Bouguenais, Loire-Atlantique, Guimard rode as a junior, an amateur and a professional, on the road, track and in cyclo-cross. He was national champion in all three forms: road in 1967 as an amateur, track sprint in 1970 and cyclo-cross in 1976. The riders ahead of him in the 1970 and 1971 professional road championships were disqualified and the titles not given. He said: "After those in front of me were disqualified for failing the drugs test, the federation never had the idea of giving me the titles.". Guimard was then president of the riders' union and the resentment which that created was why he was not named champion, he claimed.

Guimard was a sprinter who won nearly 100 races in eight seasons. He had a very strong performance in the 1971 Vuelta a España where he won two stages, the points, sprints and combination competitions while also finishing just outside the top 10 in the overall classification.

He won stages of the Tour de France in 1970, 1972, 1973 and 1974 – four of them in 1972 – although he finished the race only twice. He came 62nd in 1970 and seventh in 1971, the only year in which he didn't win a stage. He wore the Green jersey of leader of the points competition in 1972 and also won that year's combativity award.

Guimard's most striking Tour de France was in 1972, when he wore the yellow jersey as leader of the general classification and matched Eddy Merckx in the mountains. Fighting to keep the lead on long climbs created pain in his knees, one of which he injured in 1969 in an accident with a car while he was training. Merckx won two stages in the Alps and Guimard the next. Merckx tried to dispose of him on a 28 km stage to Mont Revard but Guimard, instead of cracking, won by 10 cm as the Belgian raised his hands thinking he had won.

Guimard was in second place and leading the points competition two days from the finish in Paris when he was forced to withdraw.

There were concerns about Guimard's treatment during the race, and reports that he had to be carried to his bike each morning because he could no longer walk. The team official caring for him was Bernard Sainz, sentenced to three years in 2008 for doping athletes and practising as an unqualified doctor. Sainz was sentenced to be jailed for the first half of the sentence and to be released on probation for the rest. He produced no evidence of medical training at his trial. He wrote in his autobiography:

It was at the time of our collaboration that the first accusations of doping came. An absurd rumour with a life as long as the Loch Ness monster because I saw it reappear in the Journal du Dimanche on 30 April 2000! For 30 years, people have been saying that I pushed Cyrille beyond his limits and that his knees ended up cracking in the 1972 Tour de France because of my methods. As is often the case, people talk and write, claiming to know everything when they know nothing.

The two men met when Sainz was assistant manager of Gan, the team for which Guimard rode with Raymond Poulidor. Sainz was at Guimard's side throughout the 1972 Tour. In 1973, Guimard was caught in a drugs test at the end of the stage from Avignon to Montpellier. Knee pain ended Guimard's racing and he moved into team management.

== Team management ==
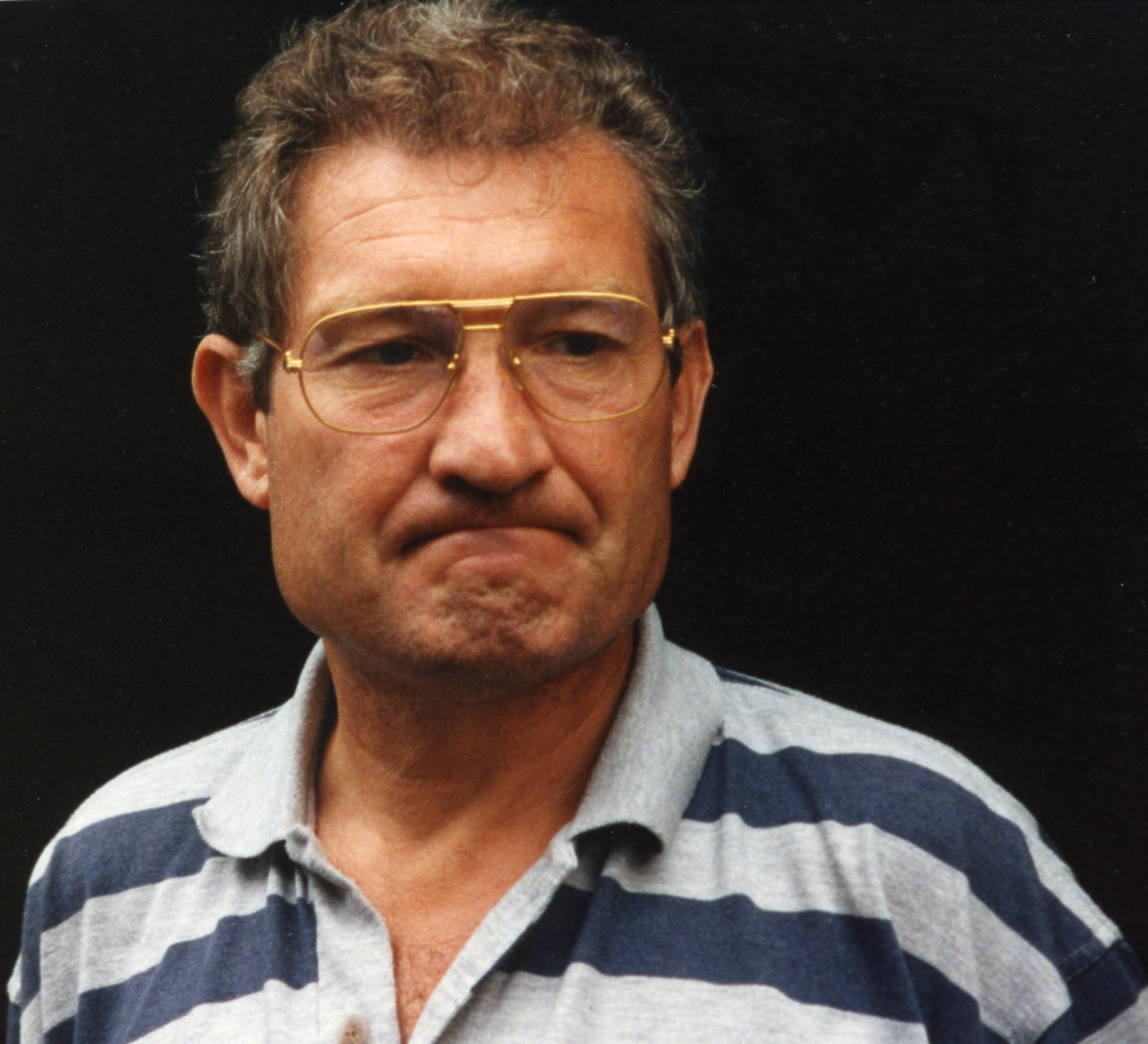
Guimard at the 1993 Tour de France

Guimard became a directeur sportif with the Gitane team, which included Bernard Hinault and Lucien Van Impe. It was run by the former national champion, Jean Stablinski. Guimard had just won the French cyclo-cross championship. He took over as main directeur sportif in 1976. Hinault was considering leaving the team but Guimard, who had ridden in the peloton with Hinault, convinced him to stay. Hinault said: "Stablinski was a manager of the old school: 'Race and we'll talk about it later.' He gave me no advice at all, though he was decent enough. I would have been more impressed if he'd stuck to his word and not had me racing every race on the calendar. I wasn't a machine and he expected too much of me. But for Guimard, I might have joined up with Raymond Poulidor of the Mercier team and we'd never have got on. There'd have been wars between us and I'd have been off again, trying all the teams one by one, and wasting a lot of time. If you want to devote yourself to racing, you must find the right conditions and be able to get on with your colleagues. With Guimard I knew that things would improve and that we could agree on a programme. Guimard and I had a perfect understanding and realised most of our ambitions, even if we were to fall out later."

It was as directeur sportif that Guimard forged his reputation. He ran Gitane–Campagnolo, Renault–Elf–Gitane, Système U–Gitane, Super U, Castorama, and Cofidis; riders under his direction included Van Impe, Hinault, Laurent Fignon, Greg LeMond, Charly Mottet and Marc Madiot. Seven times his riders won the Tour de France. Said Van Impe:

Cyrille was one of the best directeurs sportifs that I ever met. Without him, I don't know if I would ever have won the Tour. Perhaps I would, but his way of talking to riders really lifted us. There's no one better for re-motivating a rider. As a manager, he always stayed a rider in the way he thought. That makes all the difference. He always knew when to go after a break or to let it go. And everything he predicted at the morning briefing came true later in the race. On the other hand, the moment the race was over he always wanted the last word... a real Breton! But Guimard is Guimard.

In the Saint Lary Soulan stage of the 1976 Tour de France Van Impe was following Joop Zoetemelk, calculating that the Dutchman would exhaust himself. He ignored the urgings of team assistants to go on the attack and said that if Guimard wanted him to ride differently then he was to say so himself. Guimard drove up alongside Van Impe and shouted that he'd run him off the road with his car if Van Impe didn't attack. Van Impe attacked, caught the riders ahead, put almost half the field outside the time limit and beat Zoetemelk by three minutes. In doing so he won the Tour. Said Hinault: "With Guimard, you do not argue."

Hinault said Guimard insisted he plan his season and his career. "He had no intention of taking on too much too early. Just as you plan your tactics before each race, so you should have a career strategy, too, at least for the first three or four years." Guimard told Hinault not to ride the Tour in 1977, even though he had won the Dauphiné Libéré and beaten the favourites for the Tour, Van Impe and Bernard Thévenet. Hinault rode in 1978 and won then and in four other years. In his autobiography, Hinault credited Guimard with an uncanny tactical sense that led to his greatest wins, including Liège–Bastogne–Liège of 1980.

The following season Hinault left Guimard to ride for the new La Vie Claire team. Guimard had the previous year taken on a young American, Greg LeMond, whom he knew from his win in the world junior championship in 1979 and whose career he had followed. Negotiating a contract reported as setting new standards for what riders could expect to earn exhausted his fax machine, Guimard said. "Americans are the kings of paperwork." Guimard was an ardent advocate of modern methods of rider preparation. LeMond described him as the first professional cycling coach to formally study physiology in order to apply it to rider training. He also took riders to the Equipe Renault Elf Formula One team's wind tunnel to perfect their positioning on the bike and maximise their aerodynamic efficiency.

His wind tunnel work with Hinault led to the development of the Gitane Profil, the first bike to use teardrop-shaped tubes and handlebars, which Hinault claimed gained him one and a half seconds per mile in time trials, and he also experimented with internal cabling. At the 1986 Tour de France, his rider Thierry Marie won the prologue by a quarter of a second with the aid of a "lower back rest" on his bicycle which functioned as an aileron to reduce aerodynamic drag, although the design was subsequently banned.

Guimard was left without a team when Castorama dropped out of the sport at the end of 1995. He helped form the Cofidis team but left after a court case in 1997 in which he was accused of false accounting and of obtaining credit by false pretences. Guimard had been one of the founding directors of Siclor, a company set up in 1996 with 2.8 million francs of state aid to make bicycle frames. It collapsed in January 1997 with debts of 4.5 million francs. A court sentenced Guimard to a suspended jail sentence for "abuse of social funds" and Cofidis, a moneylending company, said: "Given the personal difficulties that face Cyrille Guimard and the media risks that could unfairly bring to Cofidis, Cyrille Guimard and Cofidis have agreed to end their collaboration."

In 2003, Guimard became advisor and technical director of the French amateur cycling team Vélo Club Roubaix where he worked with the amateur Andy Schleck. In 2007, Vélo Club Roubaix Lille Metropole became a professional continental team with Guimard as manager. He remained with the team up to 2014.

In June 2017, Guimard was announced as the coach of the French national team. His successor, in 2019, was Thomas Voeckler.

== Cycling politics ==
Guimard was president of the professional riders' body, the Union Nationale des Coureurs Professionels, when he was 23.

Guimard failed to win election in 2009 as president of the Fédération Française de Cyclisme, the body representing France at the Union Cycliste Internationale. His campaign accused the federation's management of being clannish, eliminating those who did not please it and coopting those who did. He called for an audit of the federation's accounts. Professional riders, he said, should deposit a year of their salary as a suspended credit card payment, as potential payment for any doping offence.

Guimard served as a member of the French Cycling Federation's executive for four years and as a member of its federal council for two years, but resigned from the latter body in December 2014 due to the Federation's failure to consult him on sporting matters.

== Major results ==
1964
2nd Road race, National Junior Road Championships
1967
4th Overall Tour de l'Avenir

1st Points classification
1st Stages 10 & 11

1968
1st Genoa–Nice
1st Stage 4 Paris–Luxembourg
3rd Grand Prix de Monaco
8th Rund um den Henninger Turm
10th Tour de l'Hérault
1969
1st Genoa–Nice
Grand Prix du Midi Libre

1st Stages 2a & 4b

4th Critérium National de la Route
7th Paris–Roubaix
9th Tour de l'Hérault
1970
Tour de France

1st Stage 1
Held after Stages 1 & 3b
Held after Stage 1

1st Stage 2 Tour d'Indre-et-Loire
2nd Road race, National Road Championships
2nd Trofeo Laigueglia
5th Circuit de l'Aulne
6th Overall Paris–Nice
6th Overall Grand Prix du Midi Libre
7th Bruxelles–Meulebeke
1971
Vuelta a España

1st Points classification
1st Combination classification
1st Sprints classification
1st Stages 3 & 15

3rd Road race, UCI Road World Championships
3rd Road race, National Road Championships
3rd Tour of Flanders
5th Paris–Tours
5th Circuit de l'Aulne
5th Trofeo Baracchi (with Yves Hézard)
7th Overall Tour de France

Held after Stages 10–14
Held after Stages 1b & 1c

7th Gent–Wevelgem
7th Grand Prix d'Isbergues
8th Overall Tour of the Basque Country

1st Stage 5

8th Grand Prix des Nations
10th Overall Grand Prix du Midi Libre
10th Étoile de Bessèges
1972
1st Overall Grand Prix du Midi Libre

1st Stages 1 & 2a

1st Overall Tour de l'Oise

1st Stage 1

1st Paris–Bourges
1st Circuit de l'Aulne
Tour de France

1st Stages 1, 4, 14b & 15
Held after Stages 1–3a & 4–7
Held after Stages 1–17
Held after Stages 1–7

Critérium du Dauphiné Libéré

1st Points classification
1st Stage 4b

Tour d'Indre-et-Loire

1st Stages 2 & 3

1st Stage 3 Tour de Luxembourg
1st Stage 2 Setmana Catalana de Ciclisme
2nd Giro di Lombardia
3rd Road race, UCI Road World Championships
4th Overall Four Days of Dunkirk
5th Critérium des As
5th Trofeo Baracchi (with Yves Hézard)
6th Grand Prix des Nations
7th Paris–Tours
8th Critérium National de la Route
1973
Tour de France

1st Stage 3
Held after Stage 3

Critérium du Dauphiné Libéré

1st Points classification
1st Stage 2a

2nd Overall Tour d'Indre-et-Loire

1st Stage 3a

2nd Bordeaux–Paris
3rd Trophée des Grimpeurs
4th Grand Prix de Wallonie
4th Critérium National de la Route
6th La Flèche Wallonne
6th Grand-Prix de Plouay
9th Milan–San Remo
1974
1st Stage 8a Tour de France
1st Stage 3 Paris–Nice
1st Stage 5 Étoile de Bessèges
1st Stage 2b Tour de l'Aude
2nd Overall Tour Méditerranéen
3rd Overall Étoile des Espoirs

1st Stage 3

3rd Omloop der Beide Vlaanderen
1975
1st GP Ouest-France
2nd Genoa–Nice
4th Grand Prix de Wallonie
6th Overall Étoile de Bessèges

1st Stages 5a & 6

=== Grand Tour general classification results timeline ===
Grand Tour	1968	1969	1970	1971	1972	1973	1974	1975	1976
Vuelta a España	—	—	—	12	—	—	—	—	—
Giro d'Italia	Did not contest during career								
Tour de France	—	—	62	7	DNF	DNF	DNF	—	—

Legend
—	Did not compete
DNF	Did not finish
