= Guy Santy =

French cyclist

Personal information
- Born: 23 November 1950 (age 75) Lompret, France

Cycling career
- Sport: Cycling
- Discipline: Road
- Role: Rider

Professional teams
- 1971–1974: Bic
- 1975: Gitane–Campagnolo

Guy Santy (born 23 November 1950) is a French former racing cyclist. He rode in the 1972 Tour de France.

== Major results ==
1971
1st Tour du Condroz
2nd Paris–Bourges
6th overall Grand Prix du Midi Libre
1972
8th overall Grand Prix de Fourmies
1975
3rd Grand Prix de Plouay
