= Van Cauter–Magniflex–de Gribaldy =

Team information
- Registered: Belgium
- Founded: 1972
- Disbanded: 1972
- Discipline: Road

Key personnel
- General manager: Jean de Gribaldy

Team name history
- 1972: Van Cauter–Magniflex–de Gribaldy
Van Cauter–Magniflex–de Gribaldy jersey
Jersey

Van Cauter–Magniflex–de Gribaldy was a Belgian professional cycling team that existed in 1972. It was the successor of the Belgium team Hertekamp–Magniflex and the predecessor of the Italian team Magniflex. It participated in the 1972 Tour de France.
