= Ronny Vanmarcke =

Belgian cyclist

Personal information
- Born: 2 October 1947 (age 79) Lendelede, Belgium

Cycling career
- Sport: Cycling

Ronny Vanmarcke (born 2 October 1947) is a Belgian former cyclist. He competed in the team pursuit at the 1968 Summer Olympics. He also rode in the 1974 Tour de France.
