= Ludo Van Staeyen =

Belgian cyclist

Personal information
- Born: 11 December 1948 (age 77)

Cycling career
- Sport: Cycling
- Role: Rider

Ludo Van Staeyen (born 11 December 1948) is a Belgian racing cyclist. He rode in the 1972 Tour de France.
