= Gérard Moneyron =

French cyclist

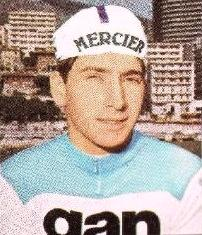

Personal information
- Born: 17 January 1948 (age 78)

Cycling career
- Sport: Cycling
- Role: Rider

Gérard Moneyron (born 17 January 1948) is a French racing cyclist. He rode in the 1972 Tour de France.
