= Mercier (cycling team) =

Former French professional cycling team (1935–1984)

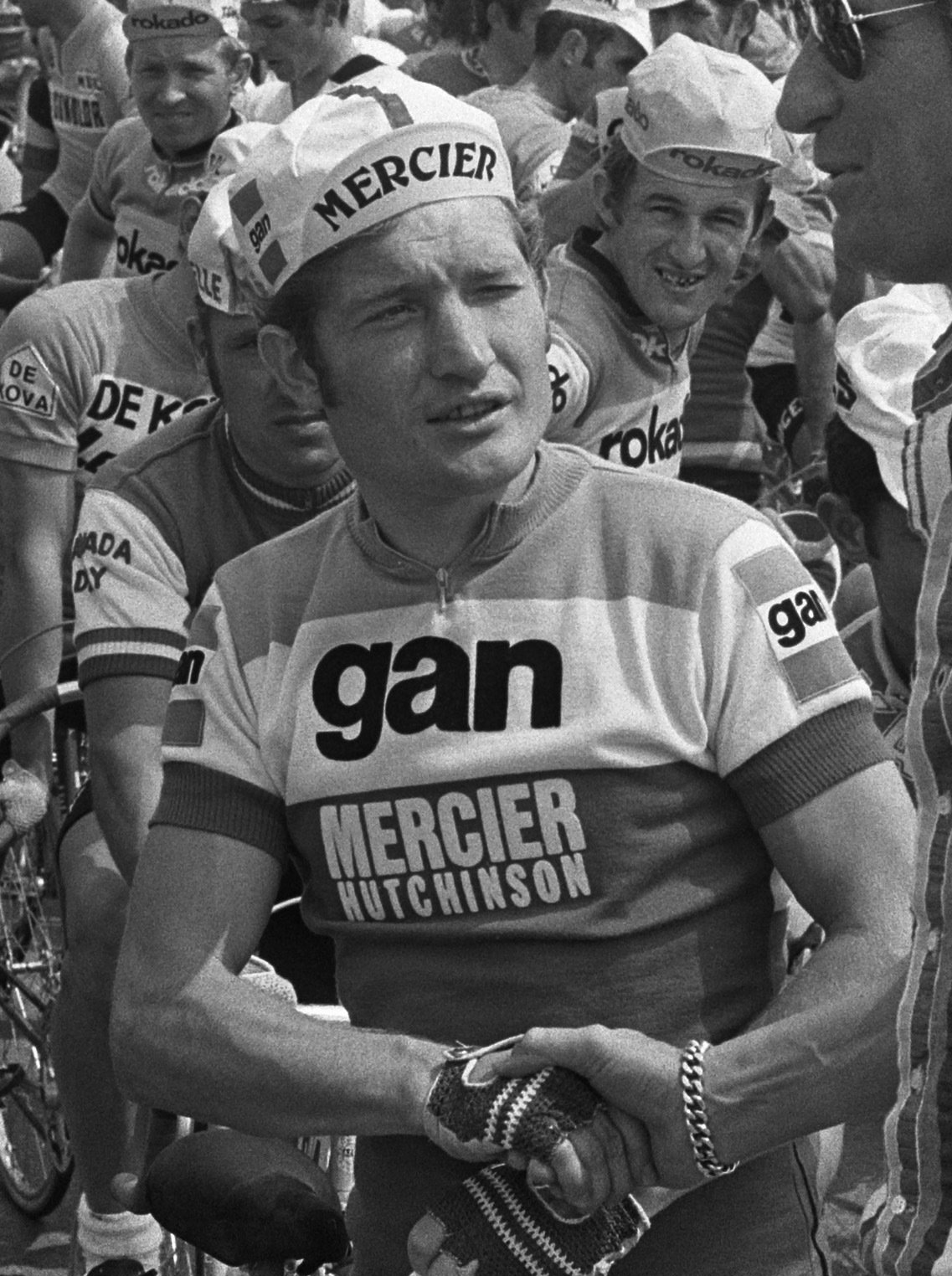
- Gan–Mercier–Hutchinson rider Cyrille Guimard at the 1973 Tour de France

Team information
- Registered: France
- Founded: 1935
- Disbanded: 1984
- Discipline: Road
- Bicycles: Cycles Mercier

Team name history
- 1935–1953 1954–1969 1970–1971 1972–1976 1977–1978 1979–1981 1982–1983 1984: Mercier–Hutchinson; Mercier–BP–Hutchinson; Fagor–Mercier–Hutchinson; Gan–Mercier–Hutchinson; Miko–Mercier–Hutchinson; Miko–Mercier–Vivagel; COOP–Mercier–Mavic; COOP–Hoonved
Mercier jersey
Jersey

Mercier was a French professional cycling team that promoted and raced on Mercier racing bikes. Together with the Peugeot team, the Mercier team had a long presence in the cycling sport and in the Tour de France from 1935 until 1984.

Mercier Team sponsorship changed in 1984 to Coop - Hoonved - Rossin, with bicycles supplied by Rossin Bikes.

Team Coop beyond Mercier bicycles has continued from 1971 to today with a number of co-sponsors.

== History ==
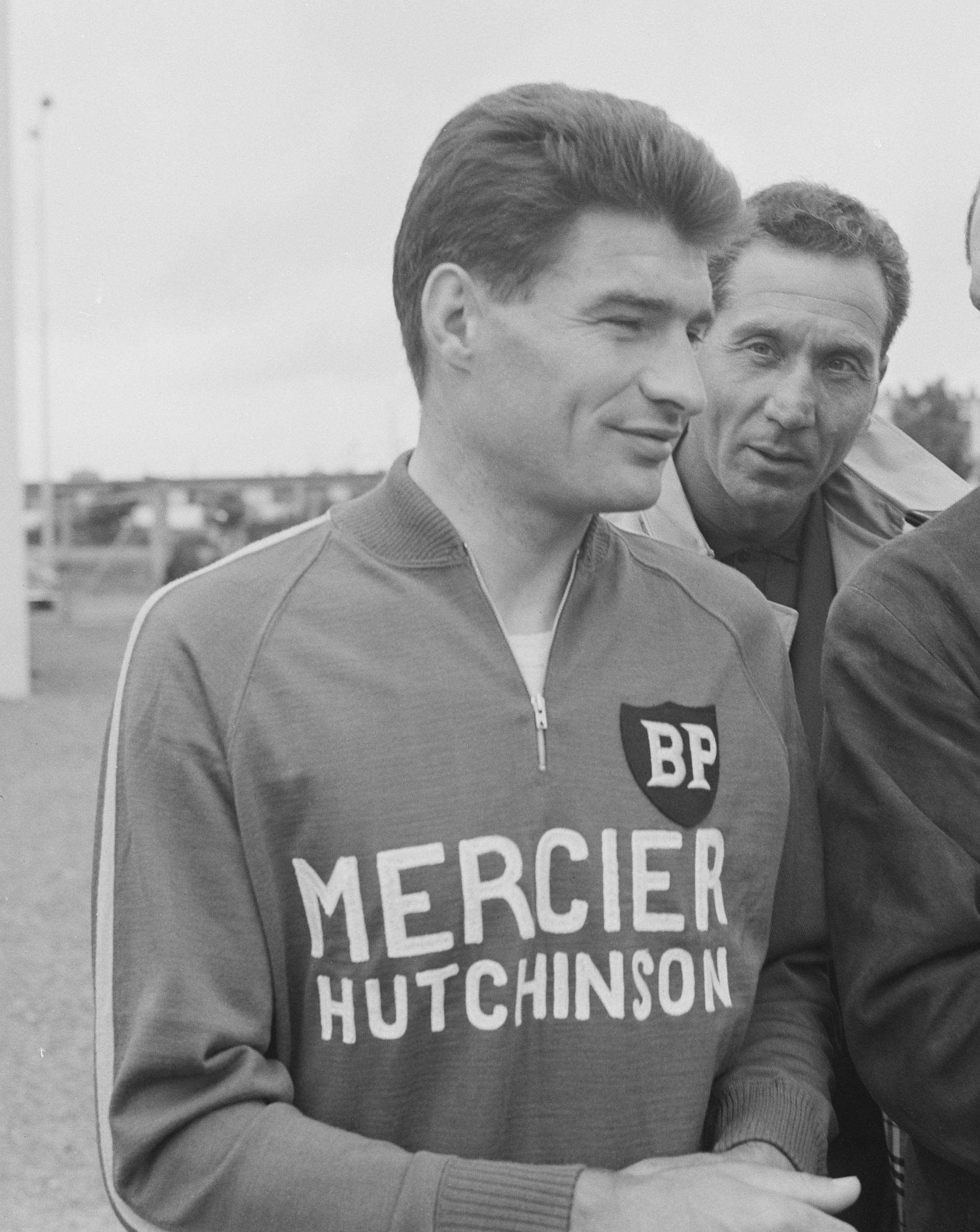
Raymond Poulidor (pictured at the 1966 Tour de France) spent his whole professional career with Mercier.

Cycles Mercier was the main sponsor of the team from at least 1935 on until 1969. From 1946 on, the team wore a purple jersey which in 1950 became the characteristic purple jersey with yellow neck and cuff lining which was to stay with the team until Mercier was no longer the main sponsor of the team in 1969. From 1935 to 1955 the team had as second sponsor Hutchinson and was the Mercier-Hutchinson team. From 1956 the team was known as Mercier-BP-Hutchinson which it would continue as until 1969 after which the sponsor Mercier became the second sponsor of the team.

Two-time Tour de France champion and 1936 World Champion Antonin Magne finished his career with the Mercier-Hutchinson team in 1941. Around ten years later in 1953, Magne was the main directeur sportif of the team and he would guide the team up until 1970 when the name of the team changed to Fagor-Mercier. Magne guided the team during many successful years. Frenchman Louison Bobet was part of the team in 1955 when he won Tour of Flanders but at this time the Tour de France was disputed by national teams so Mercier did not have the opportunity to ride the Tour as a team. Nevertheless, riders of the team won the Tour in 1937 and 1955.

Despite being on the team, it appears that Louison Bobet did not wear the Mercier-BP-Hutchinson jersey but a Bobet-BP-Hutchinson jersey. This happened during several races and was common practice at the time as can be seen with other sponsors names that took the place of Mercier for example- A. Leducq, A, Magne, F.Pelissier, Le Greves and M.Archambaud. Examples of the different jerseys can be found on the French website memoire du cyclisme. In this way Bobet was part of the Magne directed Mercier team but he rode his own mark of racing bicycles – Louison Bobet bicycles and his teams are listed as from 1955 to 1960 as Bobet-BP-Hutchinson.

After Bobet had left the team, Magne directed Frenchman Raymond Poulidor who challenged Jacques Anquetil in the Tour de France but also won many other races including Milan–San Remo and the 1964 Vuelta a España. After his Vuelta win, Poulidor famously battled Anquetil during the 1964 Tour de France and ended the race second overall, 55 seconds behind Anquetil. It was in the purple Mercier jersey with the yellow sleeves that Poulidor battled Anquetil elbow to elbow on the Puy-de-Dôme mountain. Although Poulidor did not win the Tour de France he was more popular than Anquetil with the fans. Poulidor stayed with the Mercier cycling team for his whole career.

After 1969, Mercier became the second sponsor of the team with the Spanish appliances manufacturer Fagor became the main sponsor of the team for two years making the Fagor-Mercier-Hutchinson team. Gan became the main sponsor of the team in 1973 making the Gan-Mercier-Hutchinson team which continued until 1976. During this time, Cyrille Guimard emerged as a contender for stage races, winning the Points classification in the Vuelta a España and leading the competition and sitting second overall in the 1972 Tour de France until the second last day when he was forced to retire with an injury. In that race, Guimard's teammate and the ever-consistent Poulidor finished the race third overall. Guimard's persistent injury affected his career and lead him to early retirement whereas Poulidor continued to perform at the top winning Paris–Nice in 1972 ahead of Merckx and in 1973 ahead of Joop Zoetemelk and Merckx. Poulidor finished the 1974 Tour de France second overall and his final Tour, the 1976 Tour de France in third place. Joop Zoetemelk joined the team in 1974 and stayed with the team until 1980, winning Paris–Nice in 1974, 1975 and 1979 as well as the 1979 Vuelta a España. Zoetemelk challenged Bernard Hinault in the Tour de France in 1978 and 1979, wearing the yellow jersey as leader of the general classification in both editions. In 1980, Zoetemelk changed teams to the TI–Raleigh squad where he won the Tour, and then returned to Mercier in 1982. From 1977 until 1982, Miko were the main sponsor making them the Miko-Mercier-Vivagel team, and for the final two years of the team, during 1982 and 1983, COOP was the other major sponsor making them the COOP-Mercier team.
