= Yves Hézard =

French cyclist (born 1948)

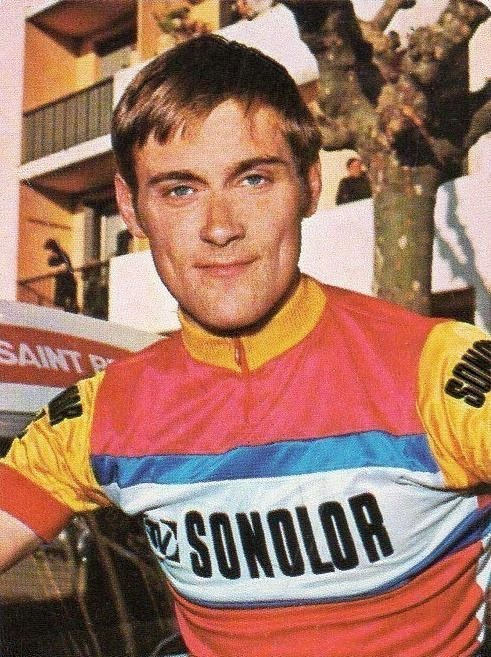
- Hézard circa 1973

Personal information
- Full name: Yves Hézard
- Born: 20 October 1948 (age 77) Donzy, France

Cycling career
- Sport: Cycling
- Discipline: Road
- Role: Rider

Major wins
- Paris–Bourges (1980); French National Road Race Champion

Yves Hézard (born 20 October 1948) is a French former professional road bicycle racer. His sporting career began with CSM Puteaux.

== Major results ==
1969
France national Military Road Race Championship
1971
Vailly-sur-Sauldre
1972
Ambert
Four Days of Dunkirk
Ronde de Seignelay
Saussignac
Tour de France:

Winner stage 7
7th place overall classification

1975
Blois
Commentry
Vaily-sur-Sauldre
1976
Angerville
Chateau-Chinon
1977
France national track pursuit championship
1978
Mende
Ronde de Seignelay
Grand Prix de Fourmies
1980
Paris–Bourges
Chamalières
1981
Bourges
