= Walter Ricci =

French cyclist

Personal information
- Born: 5 February 1946 (age 80)

Cycling career
- Sport: Cycling
- Role: Rider

Walter Ricci (born 5 February 1946) is a retired French racing cyclist. His sporting career began with CSM Persan. He rode in the 1970 Tour de France.
