= Prague–Karlovy Vary–Prague =

Race details
- Date: September
- Local name: Praha–Karlovy Vary–Praha
- Discipline: Road
- Competition: UCI Europe Tour
- Type: One day race
- Web site: www.cyklovary.cz

History
- First edition: 1921
- Editions: 65
- Final edition: 2010
- First winner: Jozef Proda-Prochazka (CZE)
- Most wins: Jan Veselý (CZE) (8 wins)
- Final winner: Andreas Schillinger (GER)

Prague–Karlovy Vary–Prague (Czech: Praha–Karlovy Vary–Praha) was a one-day cycling race held annually between 1921 and 2010 in the Czech Republic. It was part of UCI Europe Tour in category 1.2 from 2007 until its final edition in 2010.

== Winners ==
Year	Winner	Second	Third
1921	(Czechoslovakia) Jozef Proda-Prochazka	(Czechoslovakia) Antonín Perič	(Czechoslovakia) Frantisek Zima
1922	(Czechoslovakia) Bohumil Rameš	(Czechoslovakia) Karel Červenka	(Czechoslovakia) Frantisek Zima
1923	(Czechoslovakia) Karel Červenka	(Czechoslovakia) Josef Urbanek	(Austria) Paul Köttl
1924	No race		
1925	(Czechoslovakia) Karel Červenka	(Czechoslovakia) Antonín Charvát	(Czechoslovakia) Ladislav Brejla
1926	(Czechoslovakia) Karel Červenka	(Czechoslovakia) Antonín Perič	(Czechoslovakia) Josef Urbanek
1927	(Czechoslovakia) Ladislav Cisar	(Czechoslovakia) Antonín Honig	(Czechoslovakia) Antonín Perič
1928	(Austria) Antonin Chytil	(Czechoslovakia) Ladislav Brůžek	(Czechoslovakia) Antonín Perič
1929	(Czechoslovakia) Ladislav Brůžek	(Austria) Karl Thallinger	(Czechoslovakia) Josef Smisek
1930	(Czechoslovakia) Ladislav Brůžek	(Czechoslovakia) Antonín Honig	(Czechoslovakia) Ladislav Cisar
1931	(Czechoslovakia) Karel Frič	(Czechoslovakia) Antonín Honig	(Czechoslovakia) Jiří Novák
1932	(Czechoslovakia) Karel Frič	(Czechoslovakia) Jiří Novák	(Czechoslovakia) Otta Hertl
1933	(Czechoslovakia) Karel Frič	(Czechoslovakia) Frantisek Haupt	(Czechoslovakia) Karl Snobl
1934	(Denmark) Leo Nielsen	(Denmark) Frede Sörensen	(Czechoslovakia) Josef Lošek
1935	(Denmark) Frede Sörensen	(Austria) Eugen Schnalek	(Czechoslovakia) Miloslav Krbec
1936	(Czechoslovakia) Otakar Rozvoda	(Czechoslovakia) Vaclav Lachout	(Czechoslovakia) Hans Leutelt
1937	(Czechoslovakia) Otakar Rozvoda	(Czechoslovakia) Josef Lošek	(Czechoslovakia) Miroslav Loos
1938	(Czechoslovakia) Otakar Rozvoda	(Switzerland) Gottfried Weber	(Czechoslovakia) Miloslav Krbec
1939–1945	No race		
1946	(Czechoslovakia) Jan Veselý		
1947	(Czechoslovakia) Jan Veselý		
1948	(Czechoslovakia) Jan Veselý		
1949	(Czechoslovakia) Jan Veselý		
1950	(Czechoslovakia) Jan Veselý		
1951	(Czechoslovakia) Jan Veselý		
1952	(Czechoslovakia) Karel Nesl		
1953	(Czechoslovakia) Jan Kubr		
1954	(Czechoslovakia) Jan Veselý		
1955	(Czechoslovakia) Jan Veselý	(France) Robert Codemo	
1956	(France) Meunier		
1957	(Czechoslovakia) Josef Krivka	(Czechoslovakia) Walter Renner	(Czechoslovakia) Pavel Kovaru
1958	(Czechoslovakia) Rudolf Revai	(Czechoslovakia) Karel Nesl	(Czechoslovakia) Miroslav Mares
1959	(Czechoslovakia) Jan Kubr	(Czechoslovakia) Wisner	(Czechoslovakia) Betak
1960	(Czechoslovakia) Rudolf Revai		
1961	(Czechoslovakia) Jaroslav Kvapil		
1962	(Czechoslovakia) Jaroslav Kvapil	(Czechoslovakia) Rudolf Revai	(Czechoslovakia) Bern Kral
1963	(Czechoslovakia) Jan Smolík	(Czechoslovakia) Josef Volf	(Czechoslovakia) Emil Lesetecky
1964	(Czechoslovakia) Jaroslav Kvapil		
1965	(Czechoslovakia) Ján Svorada	(Czechoslovakia) Jan Palacek	(Czechoslovakia) Bohumil Chvatil
1966	(East Germany) Karl-Heinz Kacmierczak	(Czechoslovakia) Jan Smolík	(Poland) Henryk Wozniak
1967	(Czechoslovakia) Petr Hladík	(Czechoslovakia) Jan Smolík	(Czechoslovakia) Vojtech Names
1968	No race		
1969	(Czechoslovakia) Jiri Vlcek	(Czechoslovakia) Pavel Jelen	(Czechoslovakia) Vaclav Tkaczyscin
1970	(Czechoslovakia) Antonin Bartonicek	(Czechoslovakia) Jiri Kindl	(Czechoslovakia) Ladislav Kalina
1971	(Czechoslovakia) Jiří Háva	(Czechoslovakia) Vaclav Pruzek	(Czechoslovakia) Jiri Konecny
1972	(Czechoslovakia) Zdenek Bartonicek	(Czechoslovakia) Hynek Kubicek	(Czechoslovakia) Jiří Zelenka
1973	(Denmark) Emil Jörgen Hansen	(Czechoslovakia) Jiří Zelenka	(Czechoslovakia) Petr Bucháček
1974	(Czechoslovakia) Vlastimil Moravec	(Czechoslovakia) Rudolph Labus	(Czechoslovakia) Karel Vavra
1975	(Czechoslovakia) Michal Klasa	(Czechoslovakia) Jiri Bartolsic	(Czechoslovakia) Ludek Kubias
1976	(Czechoslovakia) Zdenek Bartonicek		
1977	(Czechoslovakia) Zdenek Hebeda	(East Germany) Siegbert Schmeisser	(Czechoslovakia) Teodor Černý
1978	(Czechoslovakia) Teodor Černý	(Hungary) Tomas Czatho	(Czechoslovakia) Petr Krupicka
1979	(East Germany) Martin Goetze	(Czechoslovakia) Aloïs Dohnal	(Czechoslovakia) Vendelin Květan
1980	(Czechoslovakia) Teodor Černý	(East Germany) Thomas Barth	(Poland) Leczislav Michalak
1981	(East Germany) Hans-Joachim Hartnick		
1982	(Czechoslovakia) Vendelin Květan	(Czechoslovakia) Otakar Fiala	(East Germany) Wolfgang Lötzsch
1983	(Czechoslovakia) Vladimir Dolek	(East Germany) Lutz Lötzsch	(East Germany) Jorg Höhler
1984	(Czechoslovakia) Josef Dvorak	(Czechoslovakia) Jiri Pavlicek	(Czechoslovakia) Aloïs Dohnal
1985	(Czechoslovakia) Jiri Travnicek	(East Germany) Lutz Lötzsch	(Czechoslovakia) Rostislav Veteška
1986	(East Germany) Wolfgang Lötzsch	(Czechoslovakia) Milan Jonak	(Czechoslovakia) Josef Perny
1987	(Czechoslovakia) Stanislav Mäsiar	(Czechoslovakia) Jan Habera	(Czechoslovakia) Jaroslav Buchtic
1988	(Czechoslovakia) Miroslav Sýkora	(Czechoslovakia) Ladislav Bednar	(Czechoslovakia) Karel Kaiser
1989	(Czechoslovakia) Otakar Fiala	(Czechoslovakia) Pavel Tomastik	(Czechoslovakia) Tomas Velecky
1990–2005	No race		
2006	(Croatia) Matija Kvasina	(Czech Republic) Lubor Tesař	(Czech Republic) Petr Benčík
2007	(Czech Republic) Stanislav Kozubek	(Germany) Roger Kluge	(Czech Republic) Martin Hačecký
2008	(Germany) Eric Baumann	(Germany) Dirk Müller	(Czech Republic) František Raboň
2009	(Germany) Danilo Hondo	(Slovenia) Marko Kump	(Slovenia) Grega Bole
2010	(Germany) Andreas Schillinger	(Germany) Stefan Schäfer	(Czech Republic) Leopold König
