= 1998 Sweden Hockey Games =

Tournament details
- Host country: Sweden
- City: Stockholm
- Venue: 1 (in 1 host city)
- Dates: 21–26 April 1998
- Teams: 5

Final positions
- Champions: Sweden (4th title)
- Runners-up: Czech Republic
- Third place: Finland
- Fourth place: Russia

Tournament statistics
- Games played: 10
- Goals scored: 49 (4.9 per game)
- Attendance: 69,837 (6,984 per game)
- Scoring leader: (Finland) Marko Tuomainen (5 points)

The 1998 Sweden Hockey Games was played between 21 and 26 April 1998 in Stockholm, Sweden. The Czech Republic, Finland, Sweden, Russia and Canada played a round-robin for a total of four games per team and 10 games in total. All of the games were played in the Globen in Stockholm, Sweden. The tournament was won by Sweden. The tournament was part of 1997–98 Euro Hockey Tour.

Games against Canada was not included in the 1997–98 Euro Hockey Tour.

== Standings ==
Pos	Team	Pld	W	D	L	GF	GA	GD	Pts
1	Sweden	4	3	1	0	14	6	+8	10
2	Czech Republic	4	3	0	1	12	11	+1	9
3	Finland	4	2	1	1	11	7	+4	7
4	Russia	4	1	0	3	6	12	−6	3
5	Canada	4	0	0	4	6	13	−7	0

Source: swehockey

== Games ==
All times are local. Stockholm – (Central European Time – UTC+1)

21 April 1998; 16:30	Finland	2-3 (0-1, 2-2, 0-0)	Czech Republic	Globen, Stockholm; Attendance: 1,072

Game reference

22:49 – Raimo Helminen (Kimmo Timonen, Ville Peltonen)
32:30 – Ville Peltonen (Mikko Eloranta, Raimo Helminen)
Goalies
09:42 – Josef Beránek (Marián Kacíř)
33:09 – Jiří Dopita (František Kaberle, Roman Čechmánek)
35:00 – František Kučera (Milan Hejduk)
Referee:
(Sweden) Ulf Rådbjer

	0-1	Roman Čechmánek
Jarmo Myllys	1-1
	2-1
	2-2
	2-3

12 min
Penalties
14 min
40
Shots
17

21 April 1998; 20:00	Russia	1-3 (0-1, 1-1, 0-1)	Sweden	Globen, Stockholm; Attendance: 5,021

Game reference

Goalies
Magnus Eriksson
Referee:
(Germany) Peter Slapke

	0-1	05:43 – Kim Johansson (Tommy Westlund, Jonas Bergqvist)
	0-2	24:40 – Niclas Hävelid (Hans Jonsson)
36:24 – Eduard Kudermetov	1-2
	1-3	40:56 – Mikael Johansson (Patric Kjellberg)

12 min
Penalties
18 min
22
Shots
18

22 April 1998; 15:30	Canada	2-3 (0-1, 1-0, 1-2)	Czech Republic	Globen, Stockholm; Attendance: 688

Game reference

Referee:
(Germany) Peter Slapke

	0-1	06:02 – František Kaberle (Jan Alinč, Roman Kaděra)
34:26 – Evan Marble (Mickey Elick)	1-1
	1-2	40:38 – David Výborný (Jiří Zelenka)
52:26 – Curtis Bowen (Brad Chartrand, Chris Herperger)	2-2
	2-3	56:36 – Milan Hejduk (Jiří Zelenka)

18 min
Penalties
14 min
35
Shots
33

22 April 1998; 19:00	Finland	4-0 (0-0, 2-0, 2-0)	Russia	Globen, Stockholm; Attendance: 1,012

Game reference

Referee:
Roger Öberg

22:22 – Kimmo Timonen (Raimo Helminen, Mika Strömberg)	1-0
33:12 – Mikko Eloranta (Mika Strömberg, Raimo Helminen)	2-0
41:30 – Toni Lydman (Olli Jokinen)	3-0
51:00 – Jarkko Ruutu (Joni Lius)	4-0

23 min
Penalties
65 min
25
Shots
21

23 April 1998; 20:00	Sweden	5-1 (2-1, 1-0, 2-0)	Canada	Globen, Stockholm; Attendance: 11,287

Game reference

Referee:
(Germany) Peter Slapke

00:43 – Ulf Dahlén (Nichlas Falk)	1-0
	1-1	08:32 – Chris Szyzky (Trevor Gallant, Mickey Elick)
19:54 – Tommy Westlund (Christer Olsson, Kim Johansson)	2-1
25:22 – Anders Huusko (Ulf Dahlén, Nichlas Falk)	3-1
45:26 – Fredrik Lindquist (Mikael Johansson)	4-1
47:45 – Christer Ilsson (Tommy Westlund)	5-1

16 min
Penalties
57 min
42
Shots
23

24 April 1998; 19:00	Czech Republic	4-3 (1-1, 2-0, 1-2)	Russia	Globen, Stockholm; Attendance: 1,035

Game reference

Roman Čechmánek
Goalies

Referee:
(Sweden) Thomas Andersson

00:29 – Pavel Patera (Milan Hejduk)	1-0
	1-1	09:51 – Sergei Petrenko (Sergei Fokin, Oleg Petrov) (PP)
20:14 – František Kaberle (David Výborný)	2-1
27:00 – Josef Beránek	3-1
44:18 – Jiří Vykoukal (Roman Čechmánek)	4-1
	4-2	56:30 – Oleg Belov (Alexei Kudashov, Vladislav Bulin)
	4-3	59:47 – Oleg Belov

14 min
Penalties
18 min
36
Shots
34

25 April 1998; 12:00	Canada	2-3 (2–0, 0–2, 0–1)	Finland	Globen, Stockholm; Attendance: 6,611

Game reference

Referee:
(Slovakia) Vladimir Mihalik

03:10 – Chris Szyzky,	1-0
13:39 – Chris Szyzky (Mickey Elick)	2-0
	2-1	28:22 – Jarkko Ruutu (Marko Kiprusoff)
	2-2	37:15 – Jere Karalahti
	2-3	49:46 – Joonas Jääskeläinen (Jere Karalahti)

14 min
Penalties
16 min
18
Shots
38

25 April 1998; 15:30	Czech Republic	2-4 (1–2, 0–0, 1–2)	Sweden	Globen, Stockholm; Attendance: 13,850

Game reference

Goalies
Magnus Eriksson
Referee:
(Finland) Seppo Mäkelä

04:02 – Jan Hlaváč (Marián Kacíř)	1-0
	1-1	04:30 – Anders Huusko (Hans Jonsson)
	1-2	16:47 – Fredrik Lindqvist (Mikael Johansson) (PP)
	1-3	48:54 – Christer Olsson (Kim Johnsson, Tommy Westlund (PP)
	1-4	52:43 – Anders Huusko (Ulf Dahlén) (PP)
56:38 – Jiří Veber	2-4

6 min
Penalties
27 min
31
Shots
31

26 April 1998; 13:00	Russia	2-1 (0–0, 1–1, 1–0)	Canada	Globen, Stockholm; Attendance: 2,541

Game reference
			Referee: (Finland) Seppo Mäkelä
23:58 – Andrei Skopintsev (Alexei Chupin, Oleg Petrov); 41:16 – Oleg Petrov (Igor Alexandrov) / Goals / 26:21 – Bob Maudie			Referee: (Finland) Seppo Mäkelä
48 min	Penalties	46 min	Referee: (Finland) Seppo Mäkelä
23	Shots	36	Referee: (Finland) Seppo Mäkelä

26 April 1998; 17:00	Sweden	2-2 (1–0, 0–1, 1–1)	Finland	Globen, Stockholm; Attendance: 13,850

Game reference

Referee:
(Slovakia) Vladimir Mihalik

12:12 – Kim Johnsson (Fredrik Lindquist) (PP)	1-0
	1-1	26:24 – Raimo Helminen (Mikko Eloranta, Ville Peltonen)
44:11 – Anders Huusko (Nichlas Falk)	2-1
	2-2	44:49 – Marko Kiprusoff (Juha Ikonen)

10 min
Penalties
12 min
29
Shots
26

== Scoring leaders ==
Pos	Player	Country	GP	G	A	Pts	+/−	PIM	POS
1	Raimo Helminen	Finland	4	2	3	5	+3	0	F
2	Anders Huusko	Sweden	4	4	0	4	+2	0	F
3	Kim Johnsson	Sweden	4	2	2	4	-4	0	D
4	Tommy Westlund	Sweden	4	1	3	4	+	4	F
5	Nichlas Falk	Sweden	4	0	4	4	+3	0	F

GP = Games played; G = Goals; A = Assists; Pts = Points; +/− = Plus/minus; PIM = Penalties in minutes; POS = Position
Source: quanthockey

== Tournament awards ==
The tournament directorate named the following players in the tournament 1998:

- Best goalkeeper: (Czech Republic) Roman Čechmánek
- Best defenceman: (Finland) Marko Kiprusoff
- Best forward: (Sweden) Ulf Dahlén

Media All-Star Team:

- Goaltender: (Czech Republic) Roman Čechmánek
- Defence: (Sweden) Christer Olsson, (Czech Republic) František Kaberle
- Forwards: (Sweden) Ulf Dahlén, (Finland) Raimo Helminen, (Sweden) Anders Huusko
