= Jiří Bartolšic =

Czech cyclist (1953–2024)

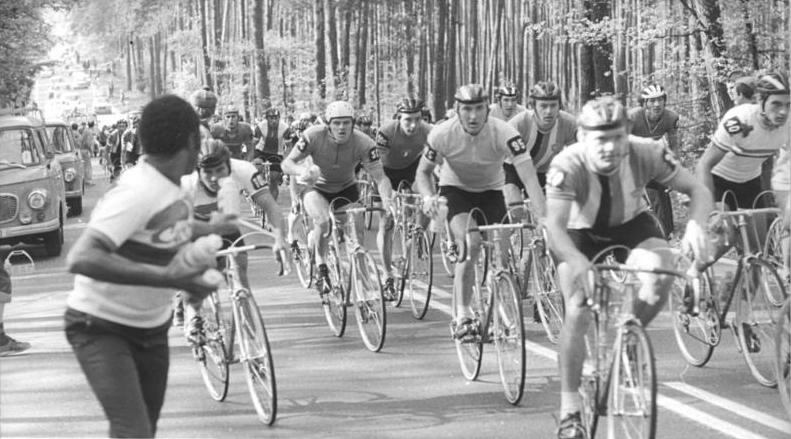
- Bartolšic (no. 20) in 1977

Personal information
- Full name: Jiří Bartolšic
- Born: 14 May 1953 Brno, Czechoslovakia
- Died: 11 October 2024 (aged 71)

Cycling career
- Sport: Cycling
- Discipline: Road
- Role: Rider

Jiří Bartolšic (14 May 1953 – 11 October 2024) was a Czech cyclist.

== Biography ==
Born in Brno on 14 May 1953, Bartolšic took his first high-level win at the Tour de Bohemia in 1973. He earned a spot on the Czechoslovak national amateur team, racing in the amateur world championships on Montjuïc and finishing 61st. He later went on to race in the Peace Race and the Tour de l'Avenir, and the Okolo Slovenska.

Bartolšic died on 11 October 2024, at the age of 71.

== Major results ==
1973
1st Tour de Bohemia
1974
1st Tour de Bohemia
1st Stages 1 & 6 Vuelta a Cuba
2nd Overall Tour of Scotland
3rd Overall Okolo Slovenska
1975
1st Overall Tour de Serbie
2nd Prague–Karlovy Vary–Prague
1976
1st Stage 4 Tour de l'Avenir
3rd Overall Tour of Scotland

1st Stage 1

1977
1st Grand Prix d'Annaba
3rd Overall Grand Prix Guillaume Tell

1st Stage 3

1978
1st Stage 6 Settimana Ciclistica Lombarda
3rd Overall Tour of Scotland

1st Stage 2

1979
2nd Tour de Bohemia
1981
1st Stage 10 Milk Race
2nd Tour de Bohemia
