= Smolek =

Smolek is a surname. Notable people with the surname include:

- Doug Zmolek (born 1970), American former professional ice hockey defenseman
- Rudolf Smolek (fl. 1908), Austrian footballer
- Željko Smolek (1953–2016), Croatian footballer

== See also ==
- Smolec
- Smolik
