= Josef Josten =

Czech journalist, publisher and campaigner (1913–1985)

- Born: Josef Stein; 25 March 1913; Prague, Bohemia, Austria-Hungary
- Died: 29 November 1985 (aged 72); London, United Kingdom
- Occupations: Journalist, publisher, campaigner
- Years active: 1938–1985
- Employer: Free Czechoslovak Information Service (FCI)

Josef Josten (25 March 1913 – 29 November 1985) was a Czech exiled journalist, publisher and campaigner. His early life in Czechoslovakia included two escapes, firstly from military occupation and secondly after a political coup. In his subsequent career in the United Kingdom, he warned of the dangers of authoritarianism, particularly communism.

Josten was the first Western journalist to report on the Soviet atom bomb test, organised a major international exhibition of political cartoons and ran a campaign for the release of the imprisoned dissident Václav Havel. Later in life, he won a degree of public recognition in the United Kingdom, but he did not live to see the eventual change of regime in Prague for which he had worked.

== Early life ==
Josef Stein was born on 25 March 1913 to Karel and Emilia Stein in Prague, then in the Kingdom of Bohemia of Austria-Hungary. His father died when he was about five years old, and his mother became an invalid when he was a teenager, so he had to leave grammar school and find a series of jobs to support her. In his late teens he became interested in journalism, partly through following the cycling achievements of his cousin Antonín Honig. He wrote articles for several newspapers and journals using the pseudonym "Josten" (short for Josef Stein), eventually adopting this as his surname. In 1938, he joined the staff of the national daily Lidové noviny.

== Two escapes ==
When the German occupation of Czechoslovakia took place in 1939, Josten joined an underground organisation, helping young Czechs to escape from the occupation and join the Allied forces. When his activities became apparent to the Nazi occupiers, he had to escape, travelling first through hostile territory in Slovakia and Hungary and then to Yugoslavia. There he received help to join the French army in Lebanon, before being transported to France. As the Nazis advanced through France, he assisted with the evacuation of the Czechoslovak government-in-exile and its documents to Britain, finally boarding a British ship on 24 June 1940 and sailing for Liverpool.

In England, Josten came under British Army command and trained with other Czech and Polish escapees. In 1943, he married Patricia, the daughter of a British army officer. That same year, he was seconded to the BBC to broadcast to Czech anti-Nazi partisans on behalf of the Czech government in exile. In 1944, as a signals officer (with the rank of Lieutenant) in the Czech brigade, he was sent to France for active service.

After the end of the war in Europe, the couple prepared to return to Prague. However, before that he was redeployed to the newly independent Czech army as a war correspondent, based in Luxembourg from 1945 to 1947. There he set up broadcasts of news, advice and directions to large numbers of Czechs who had been deported to work in German factories. Patricia briefly became an announcer with Radio Luxembourg.

In 1947 they moved to a flat in Prague. Josten obtained a post in the Foreign Ministry as a press assistant to the Foreign Minister, Jan Masaryk, whom he had known in exile in Britain.

When the February 1948 Czechoslovak coup d'état took place, Josten was dismissed from his post, after transmitting the last uncensored message from President Beneš to his diplomats abroad. Patricia was able to leave immediately by plane but Josten had to walk, escaping through the Šumava forest with a group of friends to West Germany.

== Work in exile ==
Arriving in Britain in May 1948, in consultation with exiled politicians and the Council of Free Czechoslovakia based in the US, Josten set up a news agency, the Free Czechoslovak Information Service (FCI). The object was to report on conditions behind the "Iron Curtain". The main focus was on Czechoslovakia, but in due course bulletins were produced about Poland, Latvia, Romania, Cuba, Tibet and other countries under Communist control, including Russia. His first major scoop was breaking the story of the Soviet atom bomb test in 1949. He published weekly bulletins in both Czech ("Čechoslovák") and English ("FCI"), and ran many campaigns to discredit the Czech Communist régime. Josten vehemently opposed any form of accommodation with Communist régimes and was sometimes criticised for being too rigid in his views.

In 1958, Josten organised an international exhibition of political cartoons, The Great Challenge, in London, and published a book by the same name (see Publications below; this was followed by a further exhibition and book 40 years later). The 1958 exhibition was officially opened by Clement Attlee. It subsequently went on tour to other countries, including the USA.

In 1961, Josten came across a copy of a confidential handbook by a Czech Communist party historian, Jan Kozák, on how to take over a democratic state. He published it in Britain as "Without a Shot being Fired", with an introduction by Lord Morrison of Lambeth (Director of FCI from 1961 to 1965). This caused significant concern among Western governments and it ran to 34 editions in at least 14 languages. A further edition was published in the US after Josten's death, under the title of And not a shot is fired.

During the 60s and 70s, Josten provided assistance to a number of asylum seekers from Central and Eastern Europe, for which he gained the reputation of "The Czech Scarlet Pimpernel". A measure of his unpopularity with the Prague régime was the account by a defecting Czech intelligence agent, Josef Frolik. According to Frolik, Josten had more than once been put down for assassination - once at the personal request of President Novotný. This was later corroborated by information from another defecting agent, František August. Following the Soviet invasion of Czechoslovakia in August 1968, Josten appeared on news media and in the daily press to provide commentaries on the event.

Throughout his work as an exile, Josten made efforts to bring together exiled representatives of other Iron Curtain Countries and present a united front against their Communist régimes. This included long-running collaborations (such as the formation of the European Liaison Group) with the Czech priest Father Jan Lang and the Romanian exile Ion Rațiu. He was only partly successful, but in 1977 he was presented with the Order of "Polonia Restituta" (Poland Restored) by Kazimierz Sabbat, Prime Minister of the Polish Government in Exile (officially recognised at that time by HM Government).

In the late 70s, Josten handed over publication of the FCI bulletins to Geoffrey Stewart-Smith and turned his attention to the situation of political prisoners in Czechoslovakia, including the controversial journalist and broadcaster Vladimír Škutina and the playwright Václav Havel. With the help of various British politicians (notably Bernard Braine), he publicised their plight, latterly under the banner of "CDUP" ("Campaign for the Defence of the Unjustly Prosecuted").

In March 1985, Josten was granted an MBE for "services to journalism and publishing". On 29 November 1985, still working long hours for his cause, he died of a heart attack in London. He was survived by his widow Patricia (who died in 2007) and one son, Martin. Copies of the FCI bulletin, which were donated to libraries in the US, UK and Czechia, constitute an independent weekly record of Iron Curtain events over the period 1948–1979.

In 1995, Patricia was invited to Prague Castle to receive the Czech Medal of Merit, 1st class, from Czech President Václav Havel, in posthumous recognition of her husband's work for freedom.

== Publications ==
Some of Josten's publications are as follows.

- TGM and his Legacy to the English People, by RW Seton-Watson & Josef Josten, special print of Denní Zprávy (Daily News) of the 2nd Infantry Battalion, 1st Czech Independent Brigade, 7 March 1942
- To Ann in America, by Josef Josten, pub. 1943 by Lincolns-Prager, illustrated by Franta Bělský
- Čechoslovák v Zahranici (The Czechoslovak Abroad), weekly bulletin from 1949 to 1967
- FCI (Free Czechoslovak Information), weekly bulletin from 1949 to 1978
- Tributes to T.G.M. (Tomáš Garrigue Masaryk, President Liberator), edited by J Josten, pub. 1950 By FCI
- Oh, My Country, by Josef Josten, pub. 1949 by Latimer House; Dutch edition (Mijn Armland) in Holland, 1950; Czech editions (Československo Žaluje) in USA, 1950 and in Prague (by Naše Vojsko, ISBN 80-206-0386-7), 1993
- The Great Challenge, edited by Josef Josten, pub. 1958 by International Federation of Free Journalists; 40th anniversary edition pub. 1998 by Slab-o-Concrete Publications, ISBN 1-899866-23-X
- Without a Shot being Fired, by Jan Kozak, first pub. 1961 by Independent Information Centre; 14th English edition 1975
- Anno Humanitatis (21-8-1968), by Josef Josten, pub. 1968 by Foreign Affairs Publishing Co.
- "Oh, My Crucified Country!", by Josef Josten in Evening News, 21 August 1968 (p. 10)
- Unarmed Combat, by Josef Josten, pub. 1973 in German by Markus Verlag, then in English by DK Publishing, Delhi
- Czechoslovakia: From 1968 to Charter 77, A Record of Passive Resistance, by Josef Josten, Study 86, pub. 1977 by Institute for Conflict Studies (ICS), London
- Czechoslovakia Ten Years After Temporary Occupation, by Josef Josten, pub. 1978 in Conflict Studies by ICS, London
- "A Personal View", by Josef Josten in The Daily Telegraph, 21 July 1980 (p. 12)
