= Charles Bertrand (ice hockey) =

French ice hockey player (born 1991)

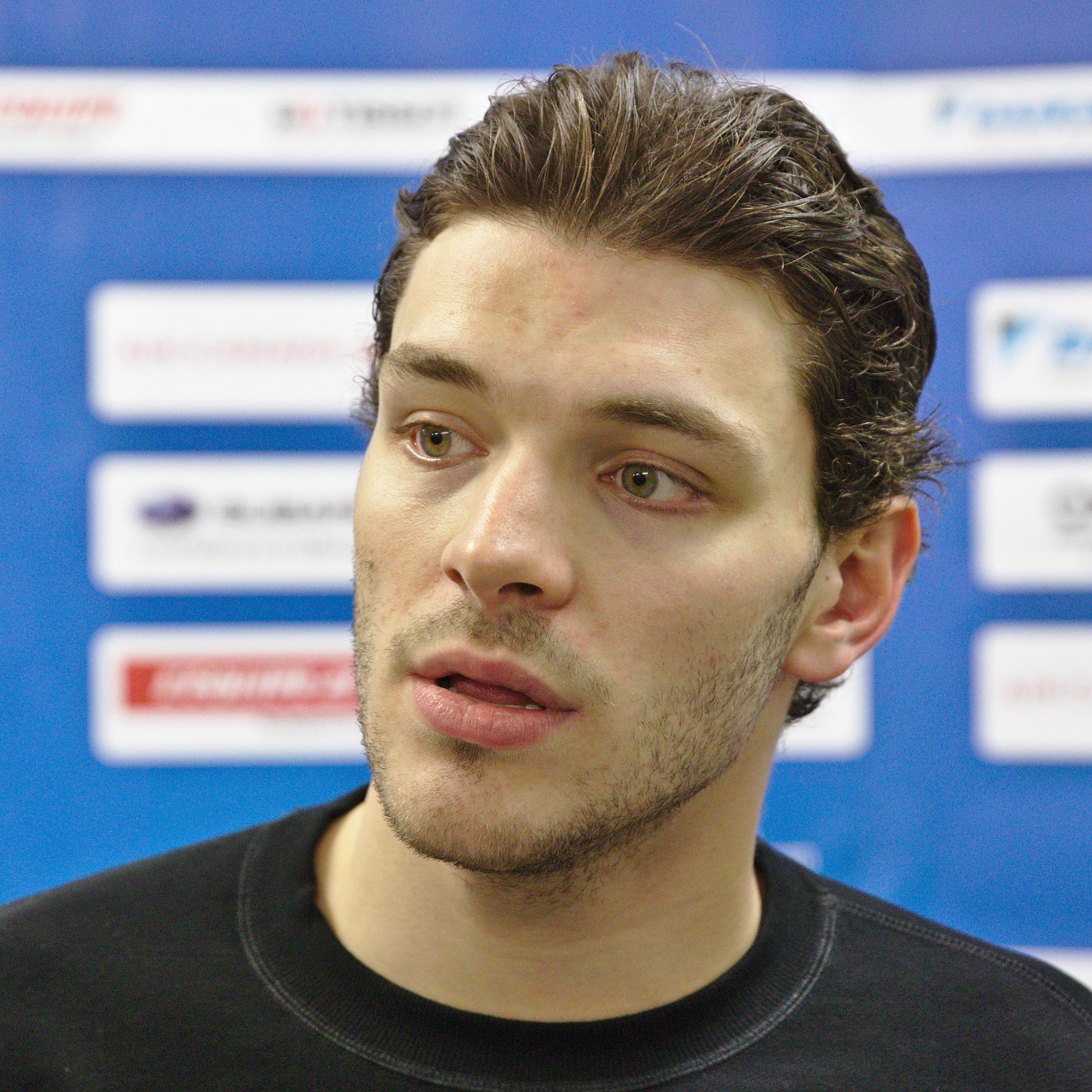
- Born: 5 February 1991 (age 35) Paris, France
- Height: 6 ft 1 in (185 cm)
- Weight: 203 lb (92 kg; 14 st 7 lb)
- Position: Forward
- Shoots: Right
- Liiga team Former teams: Vaasan Sport; Lukko; TPS; Färjestads BK; Ässät; Oulun Kärpät; HC Sibir Novosibirsk; HC Fribourg-Gottéron; Tappara; ERC Ingolstadt
- National team: France
- Playing career: 2011–present

Charles Bertrand (born 5 February 1991) is a French professional ice hockey player who is a forward for Vaasan Sport in the Liiga.

== Playing career ==
Bertrand made his professional debut in Finland, appearing in the SM-liiga for Lukko during the 2010–11 SM-liiga season.

Bertrand joined Fribourg Gottéron on 29 November 2018, as their fifth import player on a one-year deal. He dressed up in 21 regular season games with the team, putting up 10 points, but Fribourg failed to make the playoffs. Fribourg released Bertrand at the end of the relegation round.

After three seasons in the Deutsche Eishockey Liga with ERC Ingolstadt, Bertrand opted to return to the Finnish Liiga, signing a two-year contract with former club, Vaasan Sport, on 29 May 2025.

== International play ==
Bertrand joined the French national team at the 2019 IIHF World Championship and got relegated to Division I A for the 2020 edition.

== Awards and honours ==
Award	Year
Liiga
Kanada-malja champion	2017-18
Bronze-medal	2010-11
Matti Keinonen trophy	2017-18
Aarne Honkavaara trophy	2017-18
SHL
Le Mat Trophy Runners-up	2013-14
