= Matti Keinonen trophy =

Liiga ice hockey award

Matti Keinonen Trophy
- Sport: Ice hockey
- League: Liiga
- Awarded for: Most effective player in the Liiga
- Local name: Matti Keinonen -palkinto (Finnish)
- Country: Finland
- Presented by: Liiga

History
- First award: 1978
- Editions: 44
- First winner: Pekka Rautakallio
- Most wins: Tie: Juha Huikari, Lasse Kukkonen (2)
- Most recent: Aku Räty

The Matti Keinonen Trophy (Finnish: Matti Keinonen –palkinto) is an ice hockey award given by the Finnish Liiga to the "most effective player" of the season, i.e. the player with the best plus/minus rating.

== Trophy winners ==
Season	Winner
1977–78	Pekka Rautakallio (Ässät)
1978–79	Veli-Pekka Ketola (Ässät)
1979–80	Reijo Leppänen (TPS)
1980–81	Juha Huikari (Kärpät)
1981–82	Timo Nummelin (TPS)
1982–83	Carey Wilson (HIFK)
1983–84	Arto Sirviö (Jokerit)
1984–85	Esa Tikkanen (HIFK)
1985–86	Harry Nikander (Ässät)
1986–87	Juha Huikari (Kärpät)
1987–88	Risto Jalo (Ilves)
1988–89	Jukka Vilander (TPS)
1989–90	Mika Nieminen (Ilves)
1990–91	Leo Gudas (JYP)
1991–92	Waltteri Immonen (Jokerit)
1992–93	Erik Hämäläinen (Jokerit)
1993–94	Aleksandr Smirnov (TPS)
1994–95	Veli-Pekka Kautonen (HIFK)
1995–96	Petri Varis (Jokerit)
1996–97	Kimmo Timonen (TPS)
1997–98	Olli Jokinen (HIFK)
1998–99	Brian Rafalski (HIFK)
1999–00	Kai Nurminen (TPS)
2000–01	Jouni Loponen (TPS)
2001–02	Marko Tuulola (HPK)
2002–03	Lasse Kukkonen (Kärpät)
2003–04	Jari Viuhkola (Kärpät)
2004–05	Jukka Voutilainen (HPK)
2005–06	Lasse Kukkonen (Kärpät)
2006–07	Martti Järventie (Jokerit)
2007–08	Janne Pesonen (Kärpät)
2008–09	Olli Malmivaara (JYP)
2009–10	Harri Tikkanen (Lukko)
2010–11	Sami Vatanen (JYP)
2011–12	Toni Söderholm (HIFK)
2012–13	Jere Sallinen (HPK)
2013–14	Ville Pokka (Kärpät)
2014–15	Markus Hännikäinen (JYP)
2015–16	Sebastian Aho (Kärpät)
2016–17	Jasper Lindsten (TPS)
2017–18	Charles Bertrand (Kärpät)
2018–19	Nicklas Lasu (Kärpät)
2019–20	Mika Pyörälä (Kärpät)
2020–21	Anrei Hakulinen (Lukko)
2021–22	Waltteri Merelä (Tappara)
2022–23	Aku Räty (Ilves)
2023–24	Filip Král (Pelicans)
2024–25	Niclas Almari (Lukko)
