= Jaroslav Bílek =

Czech cyclist (born 1971)

Personal information
- Born: 16 March 1971 (age 55) Vimperk, Czechoslovakia

Cycling career
- Sport: Cycling

Jaroslav Bílek (born 16 March 1971) is a Czech former cyclist. He competed in the team time trial at the 1992 Summer Olympics. He also won the Peace Race in 1993.
