= Harri Tikkanen =

Finnish ice hockey player

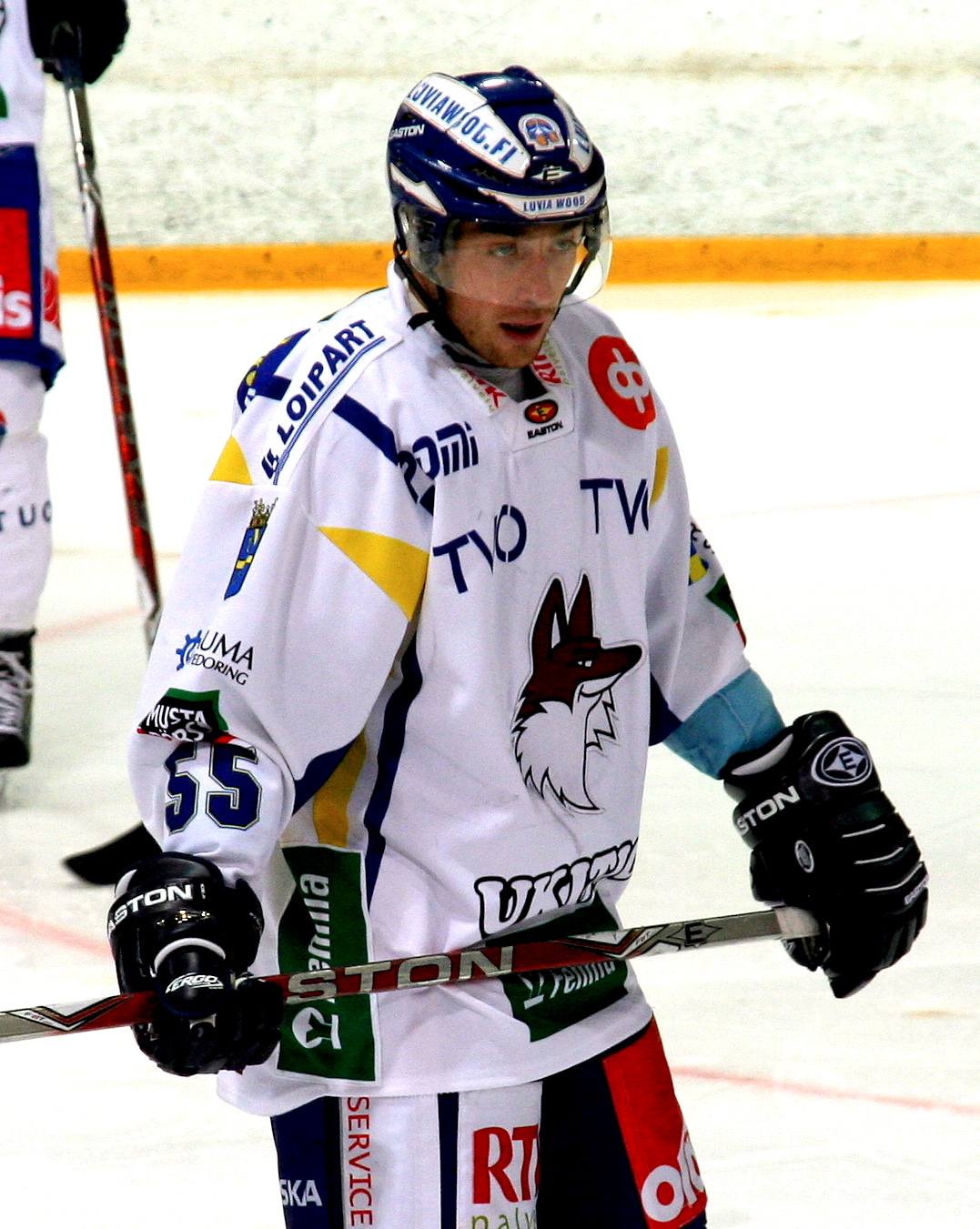
- Born: June 2, 1981 (age 43); Lappeenranta, Finland
- Height: 5 ft 9 in (175 cm)
- Weight: 176 lb (80 kg; 12 st 8 lb)
- Position: Defence
- Shot: Right
- EBEL team Former teams: Fehérvár AV19; SaiPa; HPK; Lukko; HC TPS; KHL Medveščak Zagreb
- Playing career: 1999–2020

Harri Tikkanen (born June 2, 1981) is a Finnish professional ice hockey defenceman who currently plays professionally for Fehérvár AV19 in the Austrian Hockey League (EBEL).

While playing in his native Finland for Lukko of the SM-liiga, Tikkanen won the Matti Keinonen trophy as SM-liiga plus/minus leader in 2009–10 season.

== Career statistics ==
			Regular season					Playoffs
Season	Team	League	GP	G	A	Pts	PIM	GP	G	A	Pts	PIM
1996–97	SaiPa U16	U16 SM-sarja	30	7	14	21	16	—	—	—	—	—
1997–98	SaiPa U20	U20 I-Divisioona	26	3	7	10	51	—	—	—	—	—
1998–99	SaiPa U20	U20 I-Divisioona	11	1	4	5	39	—	—	—	—	—
1999–00	SaiPa U20	U20 I-Divisioona	8	0	5	5	4	—	—	—	—	—
1999–00	SaiPa	SM-liiga	24	1	1	2	4	—	—	—	—	—
1999–00	KooKoo	I-Divisioona	3	0	2	2	4	—	—	—	—	—
2000–01	SaiPa U20	U20 SM-liiga	1	0	1	1	0	1	0	0	0	0
2000–01	SaiPa	SM-liiga	53	7	5	12	22	—	—	—	—	—
2001–02	SaiPa U20	U20 SM-liiga	4	1	2	3	2	5	0	1	1	2
2001–02	SaiPa	SM-liiga	39	3	1	4	20	—	—	—	—	—
2002–03	SaiPa	SM-liiga	56	3	9	12	28	—	—	—	—	—
2003–04	SaiPa	SM-liiga	15	1	1	2	10	—	—	—	—	—
2003–04	KooKoo	Mestis	30	4	4	8	22	—	—	—	—	—
2004–05	SaiPa	SM-liiga	38	0	0	0	22	—	—	—	—	—
2004–05	Haukat	Mestis	2	0	2	2	0	—	—	—	—	—
2004–05	KooKoo	Mestis	1	1	2	3	12	—	—	—	—	—
2005–06	SaiPa	SM-liiga	52	3	5	8	36	8	2	3	5	16
2006–07	SaiPa	SM-liiga	56	6	19	25	62	—	—	—	—	—
2007–08	HPK	SM-liiga	44	3	11	14	79	—	—	—	—	—
2008–09	HPK	SM-liiga	56	1	14	15	36	6	0	0	0	2
2009–10	Lukko	SM-liiga	53	8	14	22	42	4	0	1	1	6
2010–11	Lukko	SM-liiga	59	4	17	21	62	13	0	3	3	6
2011–12	Lukko	SM-liiga	59	5	15	20	50	3	0	0	0	2
2012–13	Lukko	SM-liiga	59	4	12	16	42	14	1	5	6	6
2013–14	Lukko	Liiga	59	5	15	20	24	15	1	1	2	14
2014–15	Lukko	Liiga	58	5	8	13	20	14	0	8	8	0
2015–16	HC TPS	Liiga	57	2	11	13	18	8	1	1	2	8
2016–17	HC TPS	Liiga	57	2	6	8	24	6	0	3	3	2
2017–18	Medvescak Zagreb	EBEL	51	0	19	19	32	6	2	1	3	2
2018–19	Fehérvár AV19	EBEL	52	10	15	25	30	6	0	1	1	6
2019–20	Fehérvár AV19	EBEL	50	3	12	15	26	—	—	—	—	—
SM-liiga totals			894	63	164	227	601	91	5	25	30	62
