= Smolik =

Smolik or Smolík is a Slavic surname that may refer to:

- Andrzej Smolik (born 1970), Polish musician, composer, and music producer
- František Smolík (1891–1972), Czech film actor
- Jan Smolík (born 1942), Czech cyclist
- Ladislav Smolík (1909–?), Czech Olympic rower
