= Jan Veselý (cyclist) =

Czech cyclist (1923–2003)

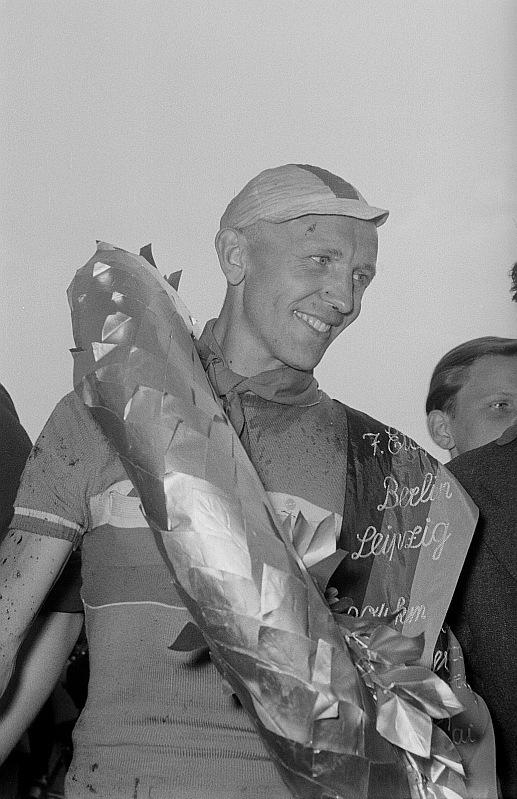
- Jan Veselý in 1954

Personal information
- Born: 17 June 1923 Plástovice), Czechoslovakia
- Died: 10 February 2003 (aged 79) Prague, Czech Republic

Cycling career
- Sport: Cycling

Jan Veselý (17 June 1923 – 10 February 2003) was a Czech cyclist. He won the Peace Race individually in 1949 and with the Czechoslovak team in 1950 and 1951. He finished second individually in 1952 and 1955 and won no fewer than sixteen stages. Thus, he became one of the most famous cyclists in the Eastern Bloc, and an iconic figure in his homeland.

Cycling was popular in post-war Europe, and the Peace Race was greater even than the Tour de France. Veselý's humility, allied to his sporting prowess, made him considered by many as a national hero. His duels with the great East German rider Gustav-Adolf ("Täve") Schur were amongst the highlights of the sporting year, his popularity comparable to that of the great runner Emil Zátopek in Czechoslovakia.

He competed in the individual and team road race events at the 1952 Summer Olympics. His brother Josef was also a competitive road cyclist and won a national title in 1943.
