= Antonín Perič =

Czech cyclist

Personal information
- Born: 30 September 1896 Prague, Austria-Hungary
- Died: 1980 (aged 83–84)

Cycling career
- Sport: Cycling

Antonín Perič (30 September 1896 – 1980) was a Czechoslovak cyclist. He competed in two events at the 1924 Summer Olympics and two events at the 1928 Summer Olympics.
