= Antonín Honig =

Czech cyclist

Antonín Honig (21 August 1906 – 12 January 1990) was a Czech cyclist who represented Czechoslovakia. In 1926, he was the Czechoslovak national champion, and he took part in the 1926 UCI Road World Championships. Two years later, he competed for Czechoslovakia in the individual and team road race events at the 1928 Summer Olympics.

Honig's cycling activities were the inspiration for his cousin Josef Josten to take up sports journalism.
