= Vlastimil Moravec =

Czech cyclist

Personal information
- Born: 7 May 1949 Nové Město nad Metují, Czechoslovakia
- Died: 15 April 1986 (aged 36) Brno, Czechoslovakia
- Height: 1.76 m (5 ft 9 in)
- Weight: 74 kg (163 lb)

Sport
- Sport: Cycling
Medal record
Representing Czech Republic
World championships
Bronze medal – third place	1975 Mettet and Yvoir	Team time trial

Vlastimil Moravec (7 May 1949 – 15 April 1986) was a Czech cyclist. He competed at the 1972 in Munich and 1976 Summer Olympics in Montreal in the 100 km team time trial and individual road race, respectively; he finished in 13th place in both events. He won a bronze medal at the 1975 UCI Road World Championships in the team time trial. Individually, he won the Tour de Slovaquie in 1970, the Peace Race in 1972, and the GP ZTS Dubnica nad Váhom in 1973 and 1974.

Moravec retired in 1981 and later worked as a cycling coach at the Army Sports Centre in Brno. He died shortly after colliding with a truck while biking home from work. He remarried just 10 days before that, and his wife was expecting a child.
