= Peace Race =

Bicycle race

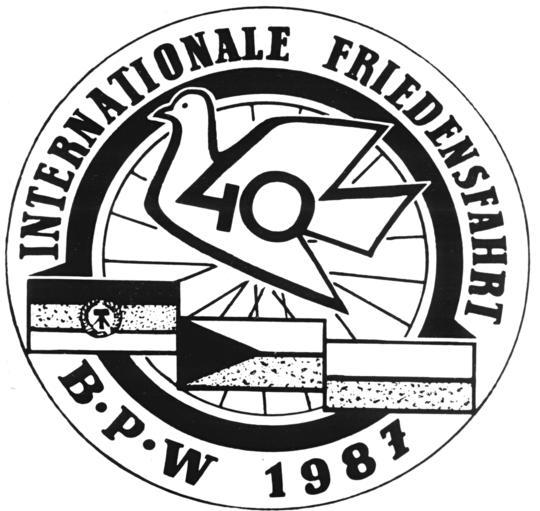
- Logo of the 1987 edition. Although the design changed during the years, it usually featured a white dove, representing peace.

Race details
- Date: 1 – 9 May
- Region: Czechoslovakia / the Czech Republic; East Germany / Germany; Poland
- English name: Peace Race
- Local name(s): Friedensfahrt (in German); Závod míru (in Czech); Preteky mieru (in Slovak); Wyścig Pokoju (in Polish); Course de la Paix (in French)
- Discipline: Road
- Competition: UCI Europe Tour
- Type: Stage-race
- Organiser: Rudé právo, Neues Deutschland and Trybuna Ludu (until 1989)

History
- First edition: 1948
- Editions: 59
- Final edition: 2006
- First winner: August Prosinek (YUG)
- Most wins: Steffen Wesemann (GER) (5 wins)
- Final winner: Giampaolo Cheula (ITA)

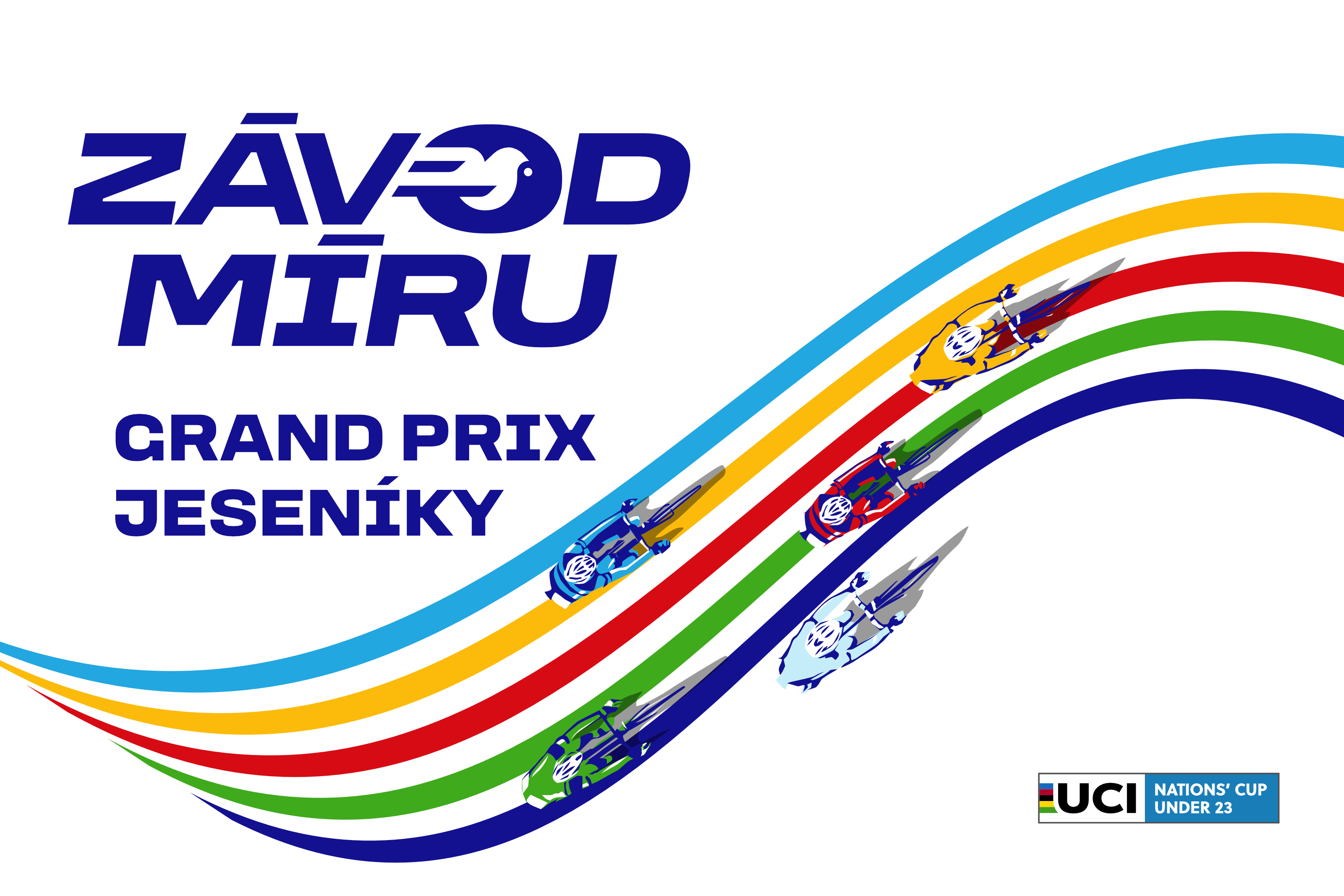
Course de la Paix Logo

The Peace Race (German: Friedensfahrt, Czech: Závod míru, Slovak: Preteky mieru, Russian: Велогонка Мира (Velogonka Mira), Polish: Wyścig Pokoju [ˈvɨɕt͡ɕik pɔˈkɔju], French: Course de la Paix, Italian: Corsa della Pace, Romanian: Cursa Păcii) was a cycling race that was established as the largest event in Eastern Europe after the Second World War. It ended in 2006. A competition resembling the original was reactivated in the Czech Republic in 2013.

== History ==
At the outset, due to the political situation, it was a nominally "amateur" event, which therefore excluded participation of Western cycling stars. Nevertheless, the organisers were able to give the event an international character thanks to the start of competitors from the Eastern Bloc sphere. Workers' organisations from Italy, France and Finland also sent their representatives. In Prague, forty-five years after the first edition of the Tour de France, seven teams set off to Poland, and ten from Warsaw.

The race was officially called Slavjantour and took place between Prague and Warsaw. It was actually two races: a seven-stage race starting in Prague and a five-stage race from Warsaw. That first year, 53 competitors set off from Prague to cover 1,106 kilometres; 39 of them reached Warsaw after the seven stages. In the opposite direction, the course measured 880 km and 65 riders attempted to cover the five sections, although only 52 arrived in Prague. The winner's yellow jersey, modelled on the Tour de France, was claimed by Yugoslavs in both destination cities: in Prague Alexander Zorič (35:53.16 hours and an average speed of 30.7 km/h), in Warsaw Augustin Prosenik (26:52.25 hours, 32.4 km/h).

It was not until 1950 that the official name was changed to the Peace Race.

Gradually, the race gained in popularity and repute, although it remained open only to amateurs and state-funded Soviet Bloc cyclists. From 1952, East Germany was added to the host countries and the races took place between Prague, Berlin and Warsaw. The opening stage starting locations and the finish line of the final stage alternated. In the eighties, the then Soviet Union was also included in the list of host countries.

After the break-up of the Czechoslovak Federation in the spring of 1993, the race remained almost exclusively in the territory of the Czech Republic. Thirteen years later the final edition of the Peace Race took place. Financial problems caused the collapse of the organisation.

Steffen Wesemann of Germany has the most victories in the history of the Peace Race. However, his five triumphs date to the period after 1989, when the Velvet Revolution took place in Czechoslovakia. Pole Ryszard Szurkowski and German Uwe Ampler can each boast four victories in the Peace Race.

German Olaf Ludwig was the absolute king among the sprinters, and he dominated the points competition eight times. In the mountain climbing competition, the best with three victories each are Sergej Suchoruchenkov from the then Soviet Union, Uwe Ampler and Czech competitor, Jaroslav Bílek.

Czech and Czechoslovak cyclists have also left an indelible mark on the history of the Peace Race. Victory was celebrated by Jan Veselý (1949), Jan Smolík (1964), Vlastimil Moravec (1972), Ján Svorada (1990), Jaroslav Bílek (1993), Pavel Padrnos (1995) and Ondřej Sosenka (2002).

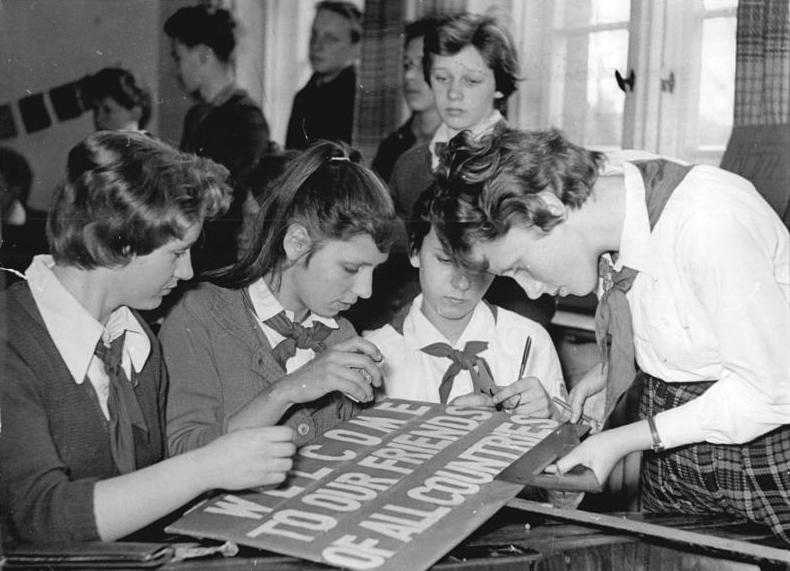
East German schoolgirls in Tessin (Rostock, Mecklenburg) making an English-language sign to be used to greet riders in the 1961 Peace Race.

=== Legacy ===
In April/May, 2012 Alan Buttler organised a re-run of the 1955 Peace Race as a tribute to his father, Alf Buttler, who was the GB cycling team mechanic for many events in the 1950s, 60s and 70s. He was joined by former peace riders including Gustav-Adolf Schur, Geoff Wiles, John Woodburn, Alan Jacob, and Axel Peschel.

There is a museum in Kleinmühlingen in Germany dedicated to the Peace Race.

=== Junior Peace Race ===
A Junior Peace Race was first held in 1965 and again the following year. After a hiatus it was revived in 1974 and has been held every year since, continuing after the senior race was no longer organised. Several riders who won the junior race have gone on to senior success, including Roman Kreuziger Sr., Roman Kreuziger Jr., Denis Menchov, Fabian Cancellara, Peter Velits, Tanel Kangert and Michal Kwiatkowski.

=== Peace Race U23 ===
2013 saw a revival of the race, but in a completely different format. It became a race for national teams of cyclists under 23 years old. Since the 2015 season it has been part of the prestigious Nations' Cup series.

Initially the race had just three stages, but this was expanded to four stages in the fourth year of the race. Past years have seen stars of the current world peloton, such as Tadej Pogačar, Tao Geoghegan Hart, Julian Alaphilippe and Marc Hirschi, lined up at the start of the race.

The Peace Race U23 is ridden over courses in the Jeseníky hills, providing a challenge to World Tour candidates.

"Every year we see young talents on the Peace Race who will soon appear on the rosters of elite division teams. Individual national teams send their best cyclists to the Peace Race. The stages of our race are regularly praised for revealing the strengths of the riders. Without exaggeration, we can say that it is a race comparable to those somewhere in the Pyrenees or the Alps," says Leopold König, director of the Under-23 Peace Race.

== List of races ==
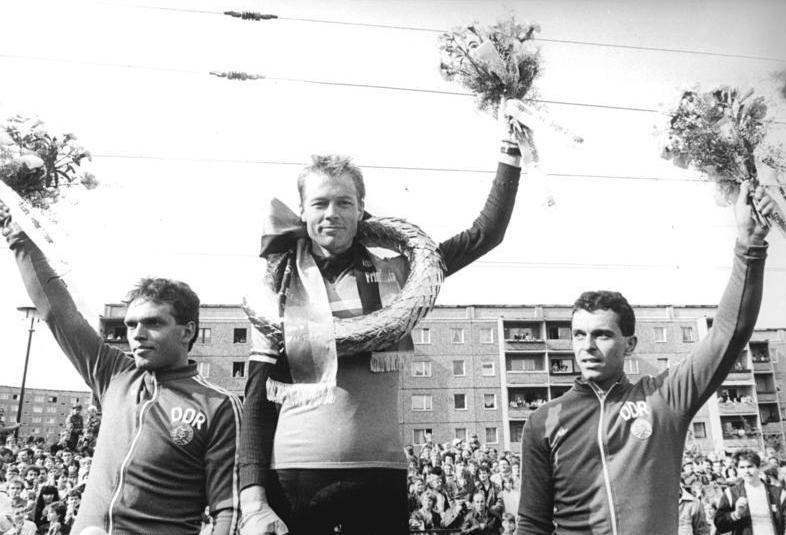
Olaf Ludwig (East Germany), Morten Saether (Norway), and Uwe Raab (East Germany) on the podium during the 1987 edition

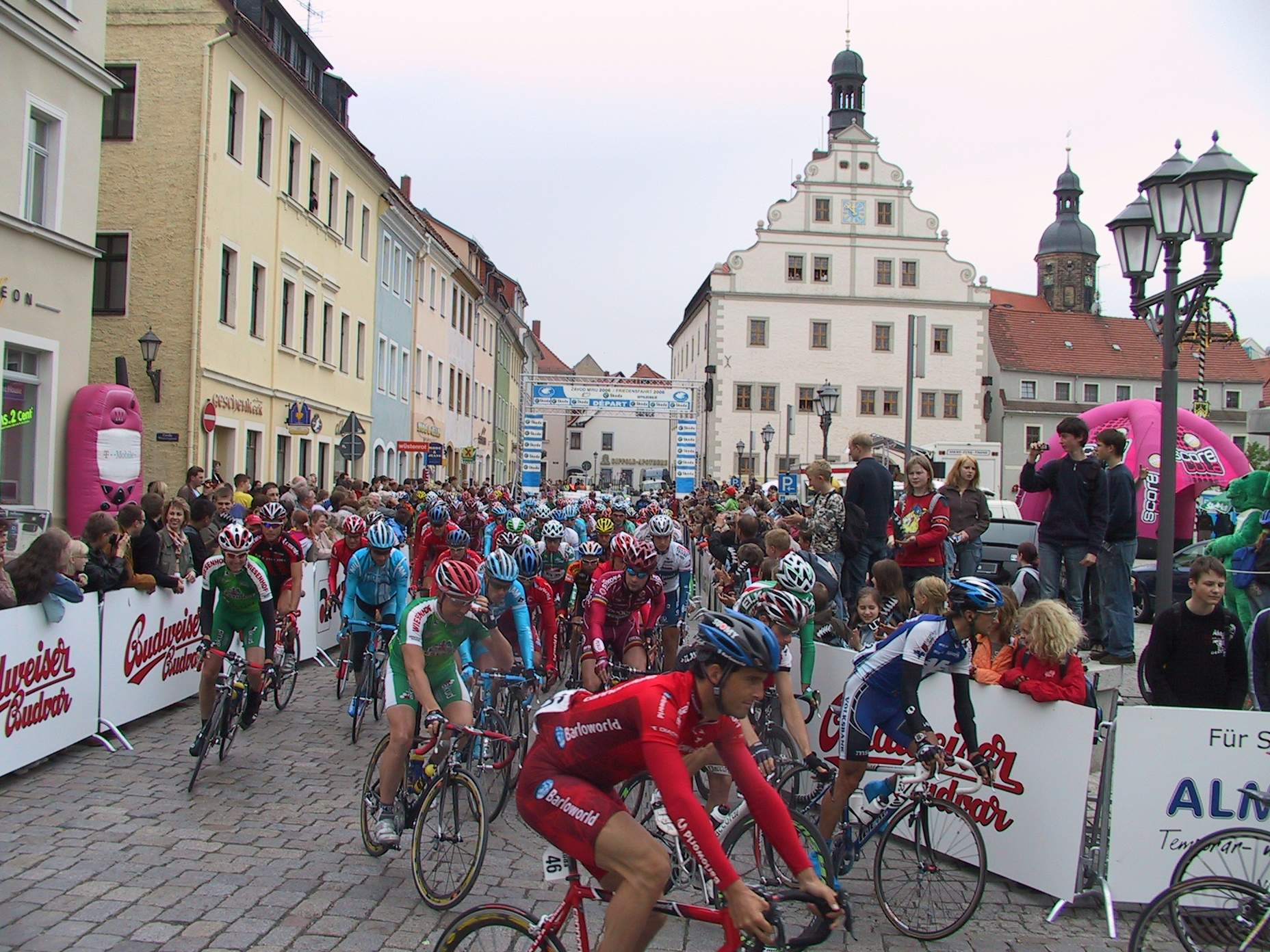
Peace Race 2006.

Year	Route	Length (in km)	Stages	Overall winner	Winning team
1948	Warsaw—Prague	1104	7	(Socialist Federal Republic of Yugoslavia) August Prosenik	Poland I [1/9]
1948	Prague—Warsaw	842	5	(Socialist Federal Republic of Yugoslavia) Aleksandar Zorić	Poland I [2/9]
1949	Prague—Warsaw	1259	8	(Czechoslovakia) Jan Veselý	France II
1950	Warsaw—Prague	1539	9	(Denmark) Willi Emborg	Czechoslovakia [1/5]
1951	Prague—Warsaw	1544	9	(Denmark) Kaj Allan Olsen	Czechoslovakia [2/5]
1952	Warsaw—Berlin—Prague	2135	12	(United Kingdom) Ian Steel	United Kingdom
1953	Bratislava—Berlin—Warsaw	2231	12	(Denmark) Christian Pedersen	East Germany [1/10]
1954	Warsaw—Berlin—Prague	2051	13	(Denmark) Eluf Dalgaard	Czechoslovakia [3/5]
1955	Prague—Berlin—Warsaw	2214	13	(East Germany) Gustav-Adolf Schur [1/2]	Czechoslovakia [4/5]
1956	Warsaw—Berlin—Prague	2212	12	(Poland) Stanisław Królak	Soviet Union [1/20]
1957	Prague—Berlin—Warsaw	2220	12	(Bulgaria) Nentcho Christov	East Germany [2/10]
1958	Warsaw—Berlin—Prague	2210	12	(Netherlands) Piet Damen	Soviet Union [2/20]
1959	Berlin—Prague—Warsaw	2057	13	(East Germany) Gustav-Adolf Schur [2/2]	Soviet Union [3/20]
1960	Prague—Warsaw—Berlin	2290	13	(East Germany) Erich Hagen	East Germany [3/10]
1961	Warsaw—Berlin—Prague	2435	13	(Soviet Union) Yury Melikhov	Soviet Union [4/20]
1962	Berlin—Prague—Warsaw	2407	14	(Soviet Union) Gainan Saidkhuzhin	Soviet Union [5/20]
1963	Prague—Warsaw—Berlin	2568	15	(East Germany) Klaus Ampler	East Germany [4/10]
1964	Warsaw—Berlin—Prague	2246	14	(Czechoslovakia) Jan Smolík	East Germany [5/10]
1965	Berlin—Prague—Warsaw	2318	15	(Soviet Union) Gennady Lebedev	Soviet Union [6/20]
1966	Prague—Warsaw—Berlin	2340	15	(France) Bernard Guyot	Soviet Union [7/20]
1967	Warsaw—Berlin—Prague	2307	16	(Belgium) Marcel Maes	Poland [3/9]
1968	Berlin—Prague—Warsaw	2352	14	(East Germany) Axel Peschel	Poland [4/9]
1969	Warsaw—Berlin	2036	15	(France) Jean-Pierre Danguillaume	East Germany [6/10]
1970	Prague—Warsaw—Berlin	1976	15	(Poland) Ryszard Szurkowski [1/4]	Poland [5/9]
1971	Warsaw—Berlin—Prague	1895	14	(Poland) Ryszard Szurkowski [2/4]	Soviet Union [8/20]
1972	Berlin—Prague—Warsaw	2025	14	(Czechoslovakia) Vlastimil Moravec	Soviet Union [9/20]
1973	Prague—Warsaw—Berlin	2076	P + 16 + E	(Poland) Ryszard Szurkowski [3/4]	Poland [6/9]
1974	Warsaw—Berlin—Prague	1806	14	(Poland) Stanisław Szozda	Poland [7/9]
1975	Berlin—Prague—Warsaw	1915	P + 13	(Poland) Ryszard Szurkowski [4/4]	Soviet Union [10/20]
1976	Prague—Warsaw—Berlin	1974	P + 14	(East Germany) Hans-Joachim Hartnick	Soviet Union [11/20]
1977	Warsaw—Berlin—Prague	1648	13	(Soviet Union) Aavo Pikkuus	Soviet Union [12/20]
1978	Berlin—Prague—Warsaw	1796	P + 12	(Soviet Union) Aleksandr Averin	Soviet Union [13/20]
1979	Prague—Warsaw—Berlin	1942	P + 14	(Soviet Union) Sergei Sukhoruchenkov [1/2]	Soviet Union [14/20]
1980	Warsaw—Berlin—Prague	2095	P + 14	(Soviet Union) Yuri Barinov	Soviet Union [15/20]
1981	Berlin—Prague—Warsaw	1887	P + 14	(Soviet Union) Shakhid Zagretdinov	P + Soviet Union [16/20]
1982	Prague—Warsaw—Berlin	1941	P + 12	(East Germany) Olaf Ludwig [1/2]	East Germany [7/10]
1983	Warsaw—Berlin—Prague	1899	P + 12	(East Germany) Falk Boden	East Germany [8/10]
1984	Berlin—Prague—Warsaw	1689	P + 11	(Soviet Union) Sergei Sukhoruchenkov [2/2]	Soviet Union [17/20]
1985	Prague—Moscow—Warsaw—Berlin	1712	P + 12	(Poland) Lech Piasecki	Soviet Union [18/20]
1986	Kiev—Warsaw—Berlin—Prague	2138	P + 15	(East Germany) Olaf Ludwig [2/2]	Soviet Union [19/20]
1987	Berlin—Prague—Warsaw	1987	P + 14	(East Germany) Uwe Ampler [1/4]	East Germany [9/10]
1988	Bratislava—Katowice—Berlin	2008	P + 13	(East Germany) Uwe Ampler [2/4]	Soviet Union [20/20]
1989	Warsaw—Berlin—Prague	1927	12	(East Germany) Uwe Ampler [3/4]	East Germany [10/10]
1990	Berlin—Slušovice—Bielsko-Biała	1595	P + 11	(Czechoslovakia) Ján Svorada	Czechoslovakia [5/5]
1991	Prague—Warsaw	1261	P + 9	(Soviet Union) Viktor Rjaksinski	Poland [8/9]
1992	Berlin—Karpacz—Mladá Boleslav	1348	P + 9	(Germany) Steffen Wesemann [1/5]	Germany
1993	Tábor—Nový Bor	1342	P + 9	(Czech Republic) Jaroslav Bílek	Czech Republic [1/2]
1994	Tábor—Trutnov	1354	P + 9	(Germany) Jens Voigt	Czech Republic [2/2]
1995	České Budějovice—Oberwiesenthal—Brno	1379	P + 10	(Czech Republic) Pavel Padrnos	Poland [9/9]
1996	Brno—Żywiec—Leipzig	1703	P + 10	(Germany) Steffen Wesemann [2/5]	Team NE Telekom
1997	Potsdam—Żywiec—Brno	1629	P + 10	(Germany) Steffen Wesemann [3/5]	(Germany) Team Deutsche Telekom [1/2]
1998	Poznań—Karlovy Vary—Erfurt	1591	10	(Germany) Uwe Ampler [4/4]	(Poland) Team Mroz [1/3]
1999	Znojmo—Polkowice—Magdeburg	1613	10	(Germany) Steffen Wesemann [4/5]	(Poland) Team Mroz [2/3]
2000	Hannover—Kudowa-Zdrój—Prague	1608	10	(Poland) Piotr Wadecki	(Germany) Team Nürnberger
2001	Łódź—Plzeň—Potsdam	1611	10	(Denmark) Jakob Piil	no competition
2002	České Budějovice—Chemnitz—Warsaw	1470	10	(Czech Republic) Ondřej Sosenka	(Poland) Team Mroz [3/3]
2003	Olomouc—Wałbrzych—Erfurt	1552	9	(Germany) Steffen Wesemann [5/5]	(Poland) Team CCC Polsat
2004	Brussels—Wrocław—Prague	1580	9	(Italy) Michele Scarponi	(Germany) T-Mobile Team [2/2]
2006	Linz—Karlovy Vary—Hannover	1283	8	(Italy) Giampaolo Cheula	(Netherlands) Team Unibet.com

- P = prologue
- E = epilogue

== Most individual wins ==
Cyclists with three wins at least listed

Overall:

- 5 wins: Steffen Wesemann
- 4 wins: Ryszard Szurkowski, Uwe Ampler

Sprinter competition:

- 8 wins: Olaf Ludwig
- 3 wins: Ryszard Szurkowski

Mountain climbers competition:

- 3 wins: Sergei Sukhoruchenkov, Uwe Ampler, Jaroslav Bílek

== Most team wins ==
- 20 wins: Soviet Union
- 10 wins: East Germany
- 9 wins: Poland
- 5 wins: Czechoslovakia
- 3 wins: Team Mroz

== Winners by country ==
Individual overall competitions were won by cyclist from following countries:

- 12 wins: East Germany
- 10 wins: Soviet Union
- 7 wins: Poland, Germany
- 5 wins: Denmark
- 4 wins: Czechoslovakia
- 3 wins: Czech Republic
- 2 wins: SFR Yugoslavia, France, Italy
- 1 win: United Kingdom, Bulgaria, Netherlands, Belgium

== See also ==
- Czech Cycling Tour
- Tour de Pologne
- Deutschland Tour
