= Olli Jokinen =

Finnish ice hockey player (born 1978)

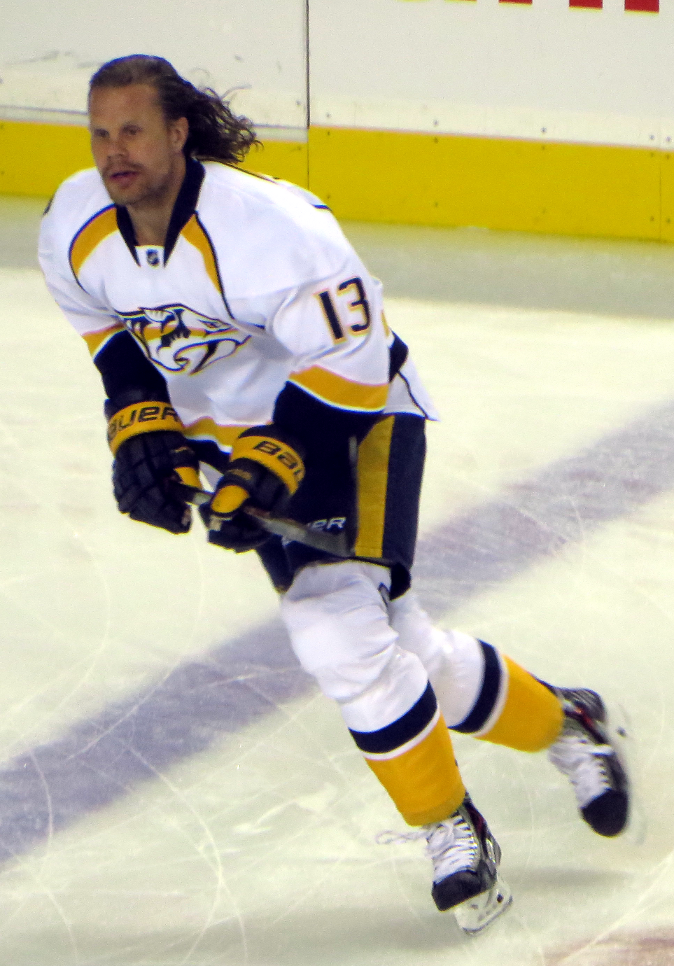
- Jokinen with the Nashville Predators in 2014
- Born: December 5, 1978 (age 47) Kuopio, Finland
- Height: 6 ft 3 in (191 cm)
- Weight: 210 lb (95 kg; 15 st 0 lb)
- Position: Centre
- Shot: Left
- Played for: KalPa; HIFK; Los Angeles Kings; New York Islanders; Florida Panthers; EHC Kloten; Södertälje SK; Phoenix Coyotes; Calgary Flames; New York Rangers; Winnipeg Jets; Nashville Predators; Toronto Maple Leafs; St. Louis Blues
- National team: Finland
- NHL draft: 3rd overall, 1997; Los Angeles Kings
- Playing career: 1995–2015

Olli Veli Pekka Jokinen (born December 5, 1978) is a Finnish former professional ice hockey player. He was selected by the Los Angeles Kings third overall in the 1997 NHL entry draft, with whom he made his NHL debut. He has also played for the New York Islanders, Florida Panthers, Phoenix Coyotes, Calgary Flames, New York Rangers, Winnipeg Jets, Nashville Predators, Toronto Maple Leafs, and St. Louis Blues. He began his professional career with KalPa and then HIFK of the Finnish SM-liiga. Additionally, he played for EHC Kloten of Switzerland's National League A and Södertälje SK of Sweden's Elitserien. He previously held the franchise records for most goals, assists, and points for the Florida Panthers.

Jokinen began his professional career in his native Finland in 1996 and in 1997 won the Jarmo Wasama memorial trophy as SM-liiga rookie of the year. He won the Matti Keinonen and Jari Kurri trophies in 1998 as the most effective player of the regular season and most valuable player of the playoffs, respectively. He moved to the NHL full-time in 1998–99 and played his best seasons with the Florida Panthers, with whom he served as captain from 2003 to 2008 and played in the 2003 All-Star Game. Jokinen played an NHL record 799 games before making his first and only Stanley Cup playoff appearance in 2009 with the Flames (Since broken by Ron Hainsey in 2017 with 907 Games played). In 2012, he played his 1,000th career NHL game.

Internationally, Jokinen has played for Finland on numerous occasions. He was an all-star and named best forward of the 1998 World Junior Ice Hockey Championships, leading his nation to the gold medal. He is a four-time Olympian, winning a silver medal at the 2006 Winter Olympics in Turin and bronze at the 2010 and 2014 Winter Olympics in Vancouver and Sochi, respectively. He has also won two silver and three bronze medals at the World Championships and played for the Finnish team that finished second to Canada at the 2004 World Cup of Hockey.

== Playing career ==
=== Finland ===
Jokinen began with his hometown team, KalPa, playing for the squad's under-18 and junior teams between 1994 and 1996. He made his debut with the senior team in the SM-liiga in 1995–96, appearing in 15 games, scoring one goal and one assist. He moved onto HIFK in 1996–97, where he played full-time with the senior squad. He was the youngest player on the team, and in 50 games, scored 14 goals and 41 points. He was recognized as the SM-liiga's rookie of the year, and was presented with the Jarmo Wasama memorial trophy.

The NHL's Central Scouting Bureau rated Jokinen as the top European prospect for the 1997 NHL entry draft. He was selected by the Los Angeles Kings with the third overall selection, after Joe Thornton and Patrick Marleau. Jokinen began the 1997–98 season with the Kings, making his NHL debut on October 1, 1997, against the Pittsburgh Penguins. He was held pointless in eight games, however, and the Kings chose to return him to HIFK to complete the season.

Jokinen played 30 games with HIFK, scoring 39 points. He added another nine points in nine playoff games as the team won the SM-liiga championship. He won the Matti Keinonen and Jari Kurri trophies in 1998 as the most effective player of the regular season and most valuable player of the playoffs, respectively. He also scored the game-winning goal in game 3 in overtime vs Ilves to secure the championship for his team.

=== Los Angeles and the New York Islanders ===
Returning to North America, Jokinen began the 1998–99 season with the Kings' American Hockey League (AHL) affiliate, the Springfield Falcons. He earned a recall to Los Angeles after nine games, in which he scored nine points. He recorded his first NHL point on November 5, 1998, with an assist in a game against the St. Louis Blues, then scored his first NHL goal five nights later against the Calgary Flames. Jokinen was named the NHL's Rookie of the Month for November, scoring eight points in 11 games. He finished the season with 21 points in 66 games played. Following the conclusion of the season, on June 20, 1999, Jokinen was traded to the New York Islanders, along with Josh Green, Mathieu Biron, and a first-round selection at that year's draft, in exchange for Žigmund Pálffy, Bryan Smolinski, Marcel Cousineau, and a fourth-round selection. Jokinen was considered the central piece of the deal from New York's perspective, as they gave up their top player in Pálffy.

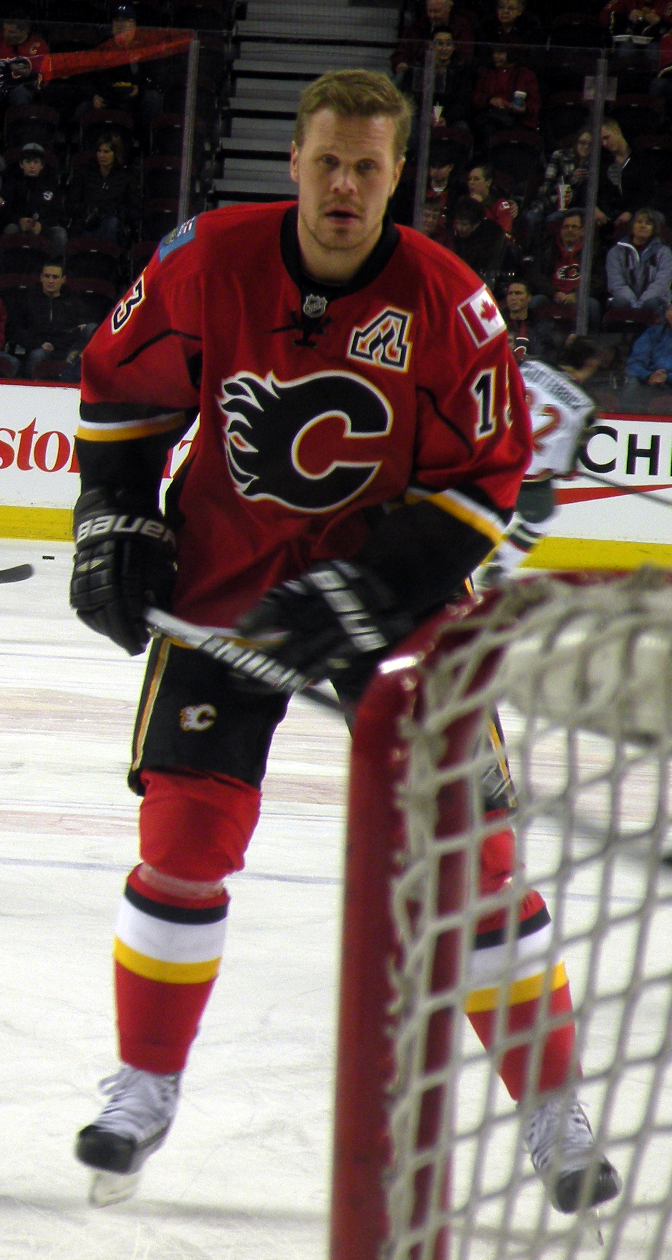
Jokinen warming up prior to a game while a member of the Flames

Jokinen played only one season on Long Island. He appeared in all 82 games for the Islanders, scoring 21 points. However, he was included in a trade at the 2000 NHL entry draft, as he was packaged with goaltender Roberto Luongo and sent to the Florida Panthers in exchange for Mark Parrish and Oleg Kvasha on June 24, 2000.

=== Florida Panthers ===
In Florida, Jokinen initially did not get along with head coach Terry Murray, as the Panthers' bench boss criticized his play while leaving him out of the lineup for several December games during the 2000–01 season. Though he appeared in 78 games for the Panthers, Jokinen's offensive totals fell to a career-low 16 points. He showed a modest improvement to 29 points in 80 games in 2001–02, but Jokinen was increasingly being criticized as a bust. His confidence reached a low point during that season, at one point he contemplated leaving the NHL and returning to Finland.

The 2002–03 season proved to be Jokinen's breakout year. Playing under new head coach Mike Keenan and described by general manager Rick Dudley as skating "every shift like it was his last," he scored 11 points in his first 12 games of the season. He equaled his previous career high of 29 points in the 26th game of the season, and finished with a team-leading 36 goals and 65 points. Additionally, he played in his first NHL All-Star Game. Jokinen credited his turnaround to Keenan, who launched into a tirade against the player's commitment during the first intermission of a game mere days after he was hired as a mid-season replacement for Terry Murray.

Jokinen was named an alternate captain of the Panthers prior to the 2002–03 season, and was elevated to captain to begin 2003–04. He again led the team in goals (26) and points (58) and scored his 200th career point on March 10, 2004, with an assist against the Buffalo Sabres. When the 2004–05 season was cancelled due to a labour dispute, Jokinen played for several European teams: first EHC Kloten of the Swiss National League A, then Södertälje SK of the Swedish Elitserien and finally HIFK back in Finland. Returning to the NHL in 2005–06, Jokinen reached new career highs with 38 goals, 51 assists and 89 points. He played his 500th NHL game on November 19, 2005, against the New York Islanders, and recorded his first NHL hat-trick on November 25 against Pittsburgh.

Appearing in all 82 games for the Panthers in 2006–07, Jokinen again set personal bests with 39 goals, 52 assists and 91 points. He fell back to 34 goals and 71 points in 2007–08, but led the Panthers offensively for the fifth consecutive season. He was involved in a frightening accident during a February 10, 2008, game against the Buffalo Sabres. Jokinen was checked by Buffalo forward Clarke MacArthur and as he fell to the ice, his skate came up and struck teammate Richard Zedník in the throat, seriously injuring him. Zedník was nearly killed by the cut and missed the remainder of the season, though he recovered and was able to resume his career.

Jokinen was the subject of trade rumours throughout the season as the Panthers, who had failed to make the Stanley Cup playoffs for seven consecutive seasons, looked at ways of improving their club. Florida ultimately traded Jokinen at the 2008 NHL entry draft; he was sent to the Phoenix Coyotes in exchange for Keith Ballard, Nick Boynton and a second-round draft pick. Jokinen left the Panthers as the franchise's all-time leader in goals (188), assists (231) and points (419).

=== Phoenix, Calgary and the New York Rangers ===
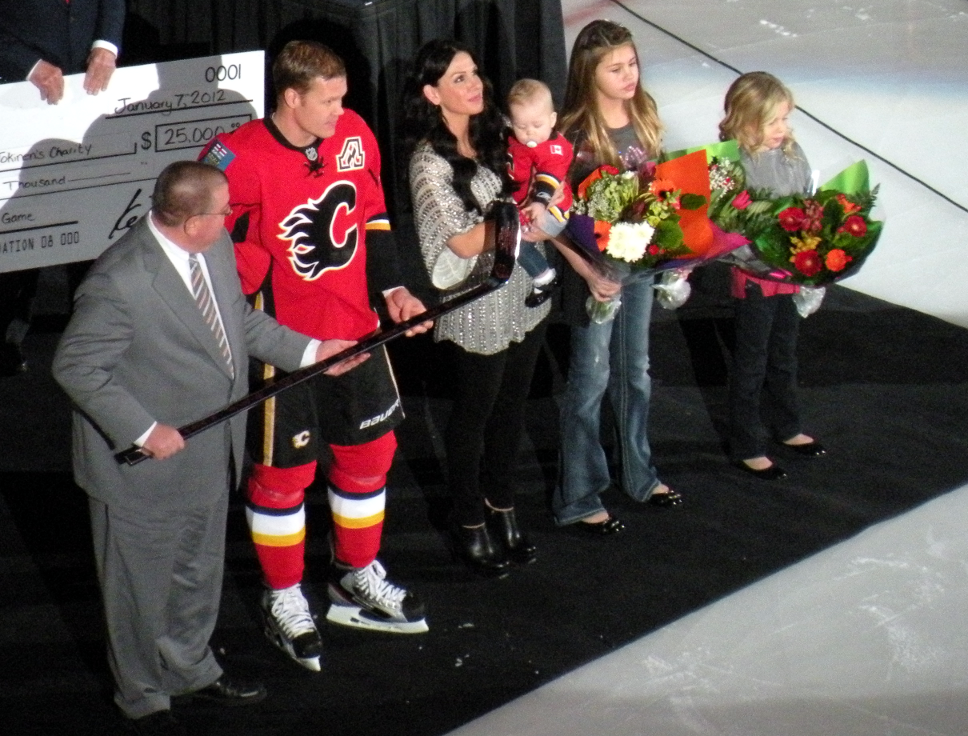
Jokinen is presented with a silver stick in honour of his 1,000th game as his family looks on

The 2008–09 season began well for Jokinen, as he recorded 18 points in his first 21 games with the Coyotes. A shoulder injury suffered in November 2008, however, caused him to miss a game for the first time since 2002–03, ending his streak of consecutive games played at 397. He appeared in 57 games for the Coyotes but did not finish the season in Phoenix; the Calgary Flames acquired him, along with a third-round draft pick, on March 4, 2009, in exchange for Matthew Lombardi, Brandon Prust and Calgary's first-round selection at the 2010 NHL entry draft.

The deal was an immediate benefit to the Flames, as Jokinen had one of the best starts for a newly acquired player in team history, scoring ten points in his first six games, and was named the NHL's Second Star of the Week for March 9–15. He fell into an offensive slump toward the end of the season, however, failing to score in Calgary's last 13 regular season games. For the first time in his ten-year NHL career, however, and after a wait of 799 NHL games, Jokinen played in the Stanley Cup playoffs. Earlier in the season, while still with Phoenix, Jokinen surpassed Guy Charron's NHL record total of 735 games without ever appearing in a playoff game. Jokinen appeared in six games during the 2009 Stanley Cup playoffs, scoring five points as the Flames were eliminated in the first round.

Jokinen's offense disappeared in 2009–10, as he scored just three goals in his first 23 games and failed to work well with captain Jarome Iginla. He was criticized by local media, who placed blame on his shoulders for the Flames' failure to make the 2010 playoffs and for failing to live up to the value expected by his US$5.25 million contract. Late in the season, Jokinen was involved in a trade to the New York Rangers, where he was sent with Brandon Prust in exchange for Aleš Kotalík and Chris Higgins, who had similarly disappointing seasons in New York.

The deal generated controversy after Canadian channel TSN had announced that the trade was complete, then claimed that the Flames had balked at completing the deal, believing they would need their players for a scheduled game. Consequently, Jokinen appeared in his final game with the Flames knowing through the media that he was to be traded afterward. When the trade was officially made, Jokinen bluntly described his feelings on the deal: "It’s a brutal business. That’s the way it goes. It comes with the salary. When you make $5 million, 11 goals is not going to cut it. ... It’s definitely a slap in the face to get traded." Jokinen scored 15 points in 21 games with the Rangers. In the final game of the season, New York faced the Philadelphia Flyers with the winner qualifying for the final playoff spot. Regulation time ended with the two teams tied, and the game ultimately went to a shootout. Jokinen came up as the Rangers' final shooter, with Philadelphia leading by one goal. His shot was stopped by Brian Boucher, ending their season.

A free agent following the season, Jokinen chose to return to the Flames, signing a two-year, $6 million contract. The deal generated a strong reaction in Calgary, as some fans expressed strong opinions against his reacquisition. The Flames' head coach Brent Sutter sought to simplify Jokinen's game and force greater defensive responsibility on the forward. He finished the 2010–11 season with 17 goals and 54 points and was praised by his coach.

Jokinen appeared in his 1,000th NHL game on January 1, 2012, a 5–3 loss to the Nashville Predators.

=== Winnipeg, Nashville, Toronto and St. Louis ===
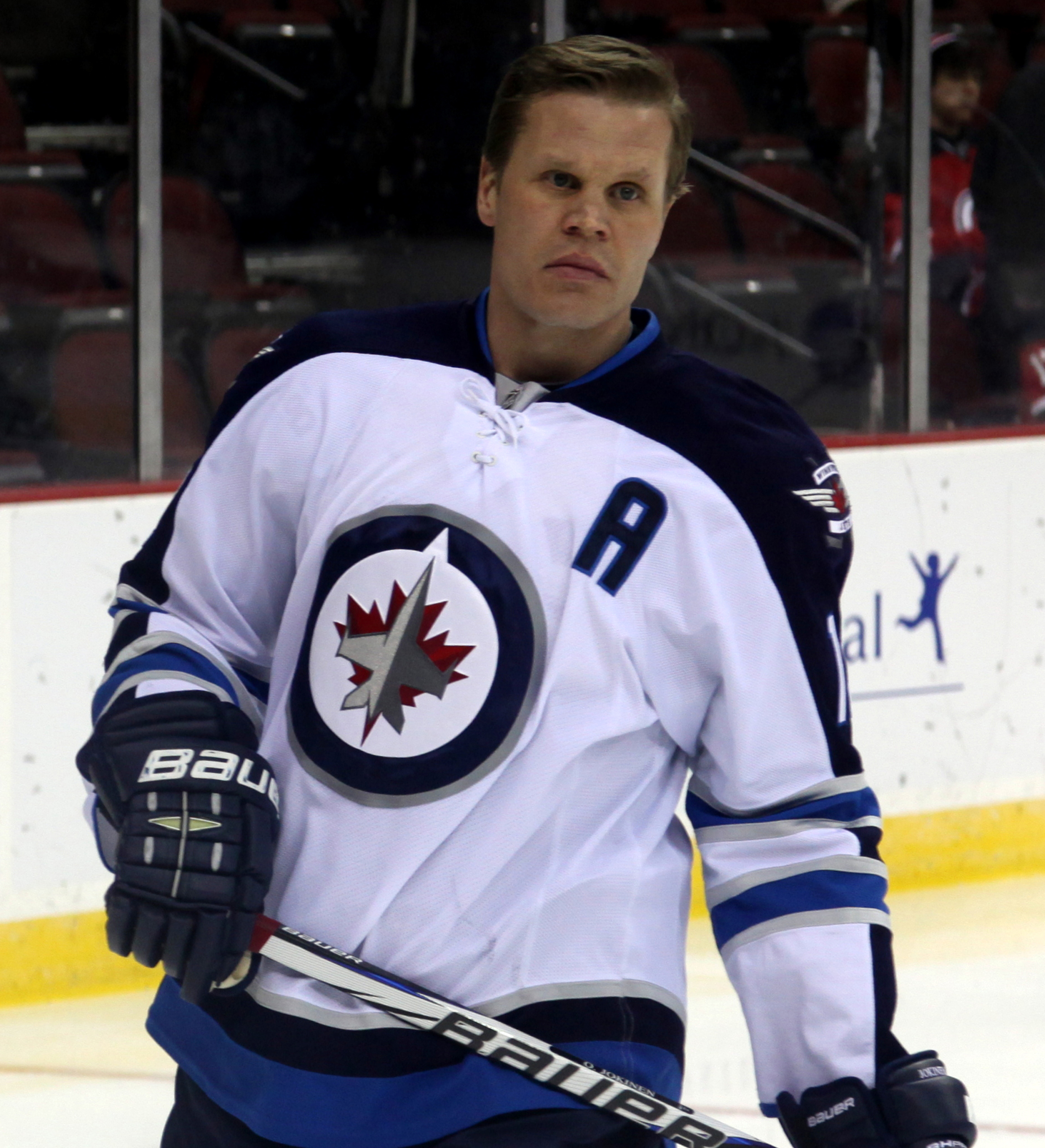
Jokinen with the Jets in 2013

After becoming an unrestricted free agent on July 1, 2012, Jokinen signed a two-year, $9 million deal with the Winnipeg Jets a day later, on July 2. He was named an alternate captain of the team at the start of the lockout-shortened 2012–13 season. While he was a popular player with his Jets teammates, Jokinen was unable to provide the type of offensive performance the team expected. He recorded only seven goals and seven assists in 45 games. Following the season, Jokinen admitted that not playing in Europe during the lockout negatively impacted his fitness and play throughout the NHL season.

Jokinen returned to Winnipeg for the 2013–14 season and reached a pair of milestones early in the campaign. He recorded both his 400th assist and 700th point on October 13, 2013, in a 3–0 victory over the New Jersey Devils. He played in all 82 games for Winnipeg and recorded 18 goals and 43 points. However, he was also passed by Bryan Little and Mark Scheifele on the Jets' depth-chart at centre. As a consequence, Winnipeg allowed Jokinen to leave via free agency. On July 20, 2014, he signed a one-year contract with the Nashville Predators worth $2.5 million.

On February 15, 2015, Jokinen, along with Brendan Leipsic and a first-round draft pick in 2015, were traded to the Toronto Maple Leafs in exchange for Cody Franson and Mike Santorelli. He wore number 11 in Toronto as opposed to his regular number 13, out of respect for the Maple Leafs' great Mats Sundin, saying, "There's only one No. 13 for the Maple Leafs and that's the way it should be."

After only six games played for Toronto, Jokinen was traded to the St. Louis Blues in exchange for forward Joakim Lindström and a conditional sixth-round pick in 2016 (Nicolas Mattinen). He played 8 games with the Blues before suffering a season-ending injury on March 6 against the Toronto Maple Leafs.

Jokinen ended his playing career after the 2014–15 season.

== International play ==
Medal record

Ice Hockey

Representing Finland

Olympic Games
Silver medal – second place	2006 Turin	
Bronze medal – third place	2010 Vancouver	
Bronze medal – third place	2014 Sochi	

World Championships
Silver medal – second place	1998 Switzerland	
Silver medal – second place	1999 Norway	
Silver medal – second place	2014 Belarus	
Bronze medal – third place	2000 Russia	
Bronze medal – third place	2006 Latvia	
Bronze medal – third place	2008 Canada	

World Cup
Silver medal – second place	2004 Toronto	

World Junior Championships
Gold medal – first place	1998 Finland	

Jokinen has represented his native Finland on numerous occasions. He first played with the Finnish national junior team at the under-18 level in the 1996 European Junior Championship. He joined the under-20 team one year later for the 1997 World Junior Championship, scoring five goals in six games. He made his debut with the senior team that same year, finishing second in team scoring with six points in eight games at the 1997 World Championship.

At the 1998 World Junior Championship, Jokinen tied with American Jeff Farkas as the tournament's scoring leader with ten points and helped Finland win the gold medal on home soil. He was named a tournament all-star at centre, and was given the Directorate Award as top forward. He then won a silver medal at the 1998 World Championship. Another silver followed in 1999 and bronze medals in 2000, 2006 and 2008. In total, Jokinen has appeared in ten World Championships for Finland, scoring 41 points in 82 games.

Jokinen made his Olympic debut at the 2002 Games, where he scored two goals in four games, though Finland were eliminated by Canada in the quarter-finals and finished in sixth place. Two years later, he helped Finland reach the final of the 2004 World Cup of Hockey, scoring the first goal in a 2–1 come-from-behind victory over the United States in the semi-final. The Finnish national teams were again defeated by Canada in the final.

At the 2006 Olympics in Turin, Jokinen tied with Teemu Selänne for the team lead with six goals and helped Finland reach its first gold medal game in a Winter Games. He and his teammates had to settle for silver, however, following a 3–2 loss to rival Sweden in the final. Jokinen won a bronze medal at his third Olympics, the 2010 Vancouver Games. He scored two goals, including the game winner, in a 5–3 victory over Slovakia in the third place game.

== Post-playing career ==
After Jokinen retired from hockey in 2015, he created the South Florida Hockey Academy, along with former Florida Panthers players Tomáš Vokoun and Radek Dvořák. While his professional hockey career began to dwindle down, he expressed an interest in coaching, and in February 2021, he was hired to coach the team Mikkelin Jukurit in Liiga, which is the highest level hockey league in Finland. After his first season with Jukurit, which he led to second place in regular season, Jokinen was awarded the Kalevi Numminen trophy.

In 2024 Olli Jokinen took over as the head coach of Timrå IK, which plays in the SHL. The Swedish team announced the contract, Jokinen's contract is a 2+1 model. So, in addition to two seasons, the contract includes one option year.

In 2025 his contract with Timrå IK was terminated and he returned to Liiga and took over as the head coach of HIFK. The Finnish team announced the contract, Jokinen's contract is once again a 2+1 model. In the 2025–26 Liiga season Jokinens Team HIFK had a lot of bad luck with injuries and finished the season disappointingly in the first playoff round losing to KalPa. Starting into the 2026–27 Liiga season HIFK signed several players following Jokinens preferred squad such as Niko Huuhtanen and Linus Nässén who played for Jokinen at Mikkeli Jukurit or Tim Juel or Lukas Pilö who were at Timrå IK under Jokinen.

== Personal life ==
Jokinen met his wife Katerina, who was born in Greece but grew up in Finland, when they were both 18. They were married in 2001, and have three daughters.

He has an older brother, Ville, who played 47 games in SM-liiga between 1996 and 1998 with four points (one goal and three assists) and 58 penalty minutes.

== Career statistics ==
=== Regular season and playoffs ===
			Regular season					Playoffs
Season	Team	League	GP	G	A	Pts	PIM	GP	G	A	Pts	PIM
1995–96	KalPa	FIN U18	9	9	13	22	4	—	—	—	—	—
1995–96	KalPa	FIN U20	25	20	14	34	47	7	4	4	8	20
1995–96	KalPa	SM-l	15	1	1	2	2	—	—	—	—	—
1996–97	HIFK	FIN U20	2	1	0	1	6	—	—	—	—	—
1996–97	HIFK	SM-l	50	14	27	41	88	—	—	—	—	—
1997–98	Los Angeles Kings	NHL	8	0	0	0	6	—	—	—	—	—
1997–98	HIFK	SM-l	30	11	28	39	32	9	7	2	9	2
1998–99	Springfield Falcons	AHL	9	3	6	9	6	—	—	—	—	—
1998–99	Los Angeles Kings	NHL	66	9	12	21	44	—	—	—	—	—
1999–2000	New York Islanders	NHL	82	11	10	21	80	—	—	—	—	—
2000–01	Florida Panthers	NHL	78	6	10	16	106	—	—	—	—	—
2001–02	Florida Panthers	NHL	80	9	20	29	98	—	—	—	—	—
2002–03	Florida Panthers	NHL	81	36	29	65	79	—	—	—	—	—
2003–04	Florida Panthers	NHL	82	26	32	58	81	—	—	—	—	—
2004–05	EHC Kloten	NLA	8	6	1	7	22	—	—	—	—	—
2004–05	Södertälje SK	SEL	23	13	9	22	52	—	—	—	—	—
2004–05	HIFK	SM-l	14	9	8	17	10	5	2	0	2	24
2005–06	Florida Panthers	NHL	82	38	51	89	88	—	—	—	—	—
2006–07	Florida Panthers	NHL	82	39	52	91	78	—	—	—	—	—
2007–08	Florida Panthers	NHL	82	34	37	71	67	—	—	—	—	—
2008–09	Phoenix Coyotes	NHL	57	21	21	42	49	—	—	—	—	—
2008–09	Calgary Flames	NHL	19	8	7	15	18	6	2	3	5	4
2009–10	Calgary Flames	NHL	56	11	24	35	53	—	—	—	—	—
2009–10	New York Rangers	NHL	26	4	11	15	22	—	—	—	—	—
2010–11	Calgary Flames	NHL	79	17	37	54	44	—	—	—	—	—
2011–12	Calgary Flames	NHL	82	23	38	61	54	—	—	—	—	—
2012–13	Winnipeg Jets	NHL	45	7	7	14	14	—	—	—	—	—
2013–14	Winnipeg Jets	NHL	82	18	25	43	62	—	—	—	—	—
2014–15	Nashville Predators	NHL	48	3	3	6	26	—	—	—	—	—
2014–15	Toronto Maple Leafs	NHL	6	0	1	1	2	—	—	—	—	—
2014–15	St. Louis Blues	NHL	8	1	2	3	0	—	—	—	—	—
SM-l totals			109	34	64	99	132	14	9	2	11	26
NHL totals			1,231	321	429	750	1,071	6	2	3	5	4

=== International ===
Year	Team	Event	Result	GP	G	A	Pts	PIM
1996	Finland	EJC	2nd place, silver medalist(s)	5	5	2	7	2
1997	Finland	WJC	5th	6	5	0	5	12
1997	Finland	WC	5th	8	4	2	6	6
1998	Finland	WJC	1st place, gold medalist(s)	7	4	6	10	6
1998	Finland	WC	2nd place, silver medalist(s)	10	0	1	1	6
1999	Finland	WC	2nd place, silver medalist(s)	10	3	1	4	14
2000	Finland	WC	3rd place, bronze medalist(s)	9	1	3	4	6
2002	Finland	OG	6th	4	2	1	3	0
2002	Finland	WC	4th	9	1	1	2	4
2003	Finland	WC	5th	7	1	2	3	8
2004	Finland	WC	6th	7	5	3	8	6
2004	Finland	WCH	2nd place, silver medalist(s)	6	2	1	3	6
2005	Finland	WC	7th	7	1	4	5	2
2006	Finland	OG	2nd place, silver medalist(s)	8	6	2	8	2
2006	Finland	WC	3rd place, bronze medalist(s)	5	2	1	3	27
2008	Finland	WC	3rd place, bronze medalist(s)	8	1	4	5	29
2010	Finland	OG	3rd place, bronze medalist(s)	6	3	1	4	2
2014	Finland	OG	3rd place, bronze medalist(s)	6	2	2	4	2
2014	Finland	WC	2nd place, silver medalist(s)	10	2	3	5	4
Junior totals				18	14	8	22	20
Senior totals				122	36	32	68	124

== Awards ==
As player

- 1996–97 SM-liiga Jarmo Wasama memorial trophy
- 1997–98 SM-liiga Matti Keinonen trophy
- 1997–98 SM-liiga Jari Kurri trophy

As coach

- 2021–22 Liiga Kalevi Numminen trophy

== See also ==
- List of NHL players with 1,000 games played

Preceded by Jani Hurme	Winner of the Jarmo Wasama memorial trophy 1996–97	Succeeded by Pasi Puistola
Preceded by Kimmo Timonen	Winner of the Matti Keinonen trophy 1997–98	Succeeded by Brian Rafalski
Preceded by Otakar Janecký	Winner of the Jari Kurri trophy 1997–98	Succeeded by Miikka Kiprusoff
Preceded by Aki Berg	Los Angeles Kings first-round draft pick 1997	Succeeded by Matt Zultek
Preceded by Pavel Bure; Paul Laus	Florida Panthers captain 2003–08	Succeeded by Bryan McCabe
