= Mickey Elick =

Canadian ice hockey player

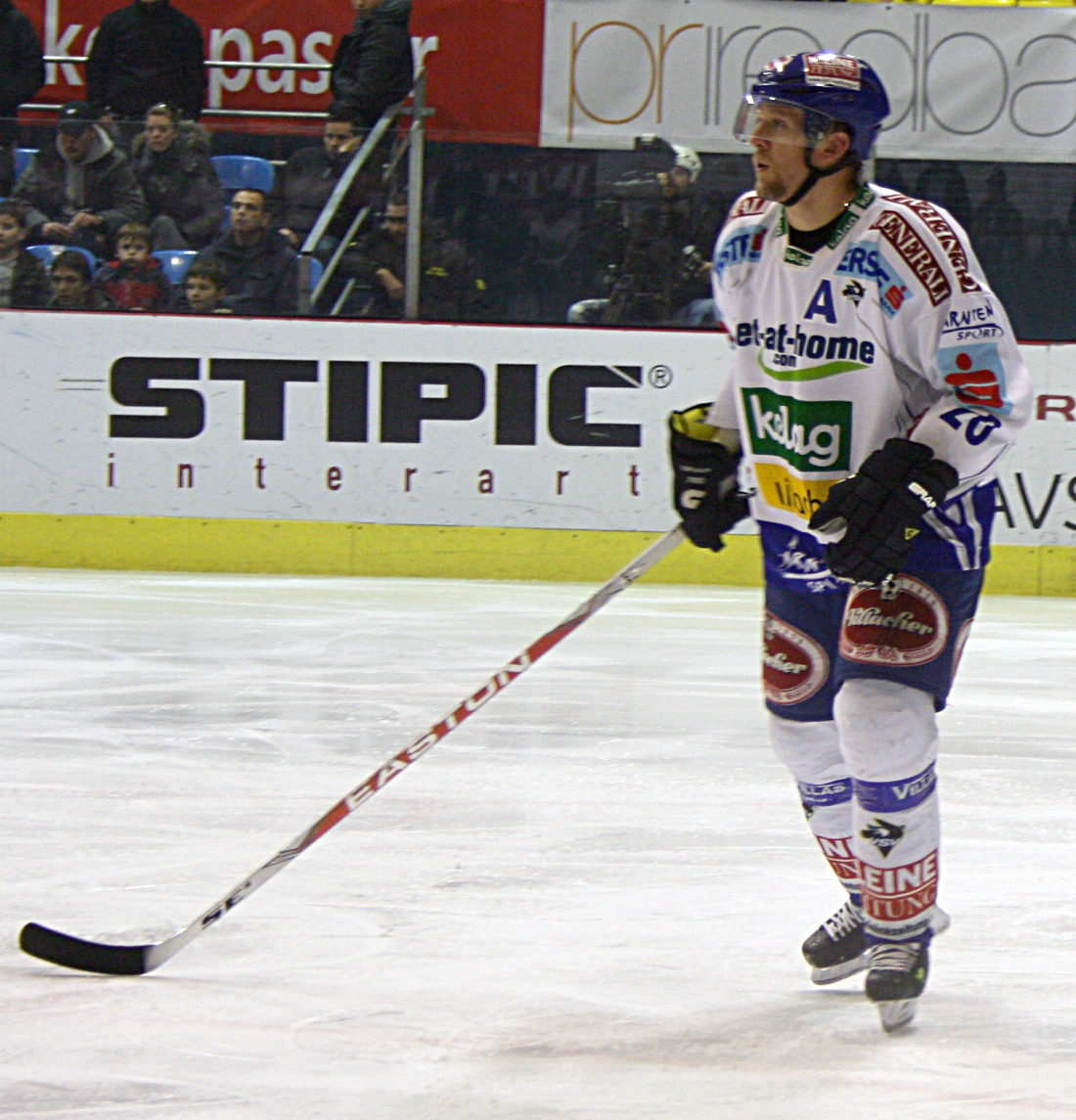
- Born: March 17, 1974 (age 52) Calgary, Alberta, Canada
- Height: 6 ft 1 in (185 cm)
- Weight: 180 lb (82 kg; 12 st 12 lb)
- Position: Defence
- Shot: Left
- ANL team Former teams: EC Dornbirn; Binghamton Rangers; EV Landshut; Saint John Flames; Krefeld Pinguine; Düsseldorfer EG; Augsburger Panther; Kölner Haie; EHC Linz; EC VSV
- National team: Canada and Austria
- NHL draft: 192nd overall, 1992; New York Rangers
- Playing career: 1996–2011

Mickey Elick (born March 17, 1974) is a Canadian former professional ice hockey defenceman, most recently for EC Dornbirn in the Austrian National League.

== Playing career ==
Born in Calgary, Alberta, Elick was drafted 192nd overall by the New York Rangers in the 1992 NHL entry draft and spent four years at the University of Wisconsin before turning pro in 1996 with the ECHL's Charlotte Checkers. After playing for the Canadian National Team in 1997, Elick spent the 1998–99 season in the American Hockey League with the Saint John Flames and in the International Hockey League with the Grand Rapids Griffins.

In 1999, Elick moved to Europe and joined the Krefeld Pinguine of the Deutsche Eishockey Liga in Germany. He went on to play four more seasons in the DEL, playing for Düsseldorfer EG, the Augsburger Panther and the Kölner Haie. In 2004, Elick moved to Austria to play for EHC Black Wings Linz in the EBHL. In 2005, Elick signed for EC VSV.

After five seasons with Villacher, Elick signed with EC Dornbirn for the 2010-11 season, in the lower Austrian National League on August 12, 2010.

== Career statistics ==
=== Regular season and playoffs ===
			Regular season					Playoffs
Season	Team	League	GP	G	A	Pts	PIM	GP	G	A	Pts	PIM
1992–93	University of Wisconsin	WCHA	32	1	6	7	24	—	—	—	—	—
1993–94	University of Wisconsin	WCHA	42	7	12	19	54	—	—	—	—	—
1994–95	University of Wisconsin	WCHA	43	5	23	28	52	—	—	—	—	—
1995–96	University of Wisconsin	WCHA	39	14	26	40	60	—	—	—	—	—
1996–97	Charlotte Checkers	ECHL	70	25	36	61	79	3	1	0	1	14
1996–97	Binghamton Rangers	AHL	1	0	1	1	2	—	—	—	—	—
1997–98	Canadian National Team	Intl	61	20	28	48	60	—	—	—	—	—
1997–98	EV Landshut	DEL	3	0	1	1	4	—	—	—	—	—
1998–99	Saint John Flames	AHL	62	2	11	13	50	—	—	—	—	—
1998–99	Grand Rapids Griffins	IHL	17	3	6	9	8	—	—	—	—	—
1999–00	Krefeld Pinguine	DEL	46	4	11	15	32	4	0	0	0	0
2000–01	Düsseldorfer EG	DEL	60	7	15	22	69	—	—	—	—	—
2001–02	Augsburger Panther	DEL	56	9	21	30	82	4	0	1	1	8
2002–03	Kölner Haie	DEL	52	6	11	17	42	15	3	3	6	16
2003–04	Kölner Haie	DEL	50	4	13	17	44	6	0	1	1	6
2004–05	EHC Linz	EBEL	48	14	21	35	44	—	—	—	—	—
2005–06	EC VSV	EBEL	41	13	19	32	36	13	1	11	12	14
2006–07	EC VSV	EBEL	52	15	25	40	64	8	4	1	5	10
2007–08	EC VSV	EBEL	36	5	18	23	26	5	0	2	2	6
2008–09	EC VSV	EBEL	30	7	16	23	40	—	—	—	—	—
2009–10	EC VSV	EBEL	48	7	8	15	70	5	0	0	0	12
2010–11	EC Dornbirn	ANL	34	12	24	36	70	5	3	1	4	4
DEL totals			267	30	72	102	273	29	3	5	8	30

=== International ===
Year	Team	Event	GP	G	A	Pts	PIM
1998	Canada	WC	6	0	0	0	4
2010	Austria	WC-D1	5	0	0	0	4
Senior int'l totals			11	0	0	0	8

== Awards and honours ==
Award	Year
WCHA All-Tournament Team	1994
