= Ladislav Brůžek =

Czech cyclist

Personal information
- Full name: Ladislav Brůžek
- Born: 23.5.1907 Praha
- Died: 13.7.1993 Praha

Cycling career
- Sport: Cycling
- Discipline: silniční cyklistika
- Role: závodník později trenér

Major wins
- 4x mistr Československé republiky

Ladislav Brůžek (born 23 May 1907) was a cyclist for Czechoslovakia. He competed in the individual and team road race events at the 1928 Summer Olympics.
