= Kimmo Timonen =

Finnish ice hockey player (born 1975)

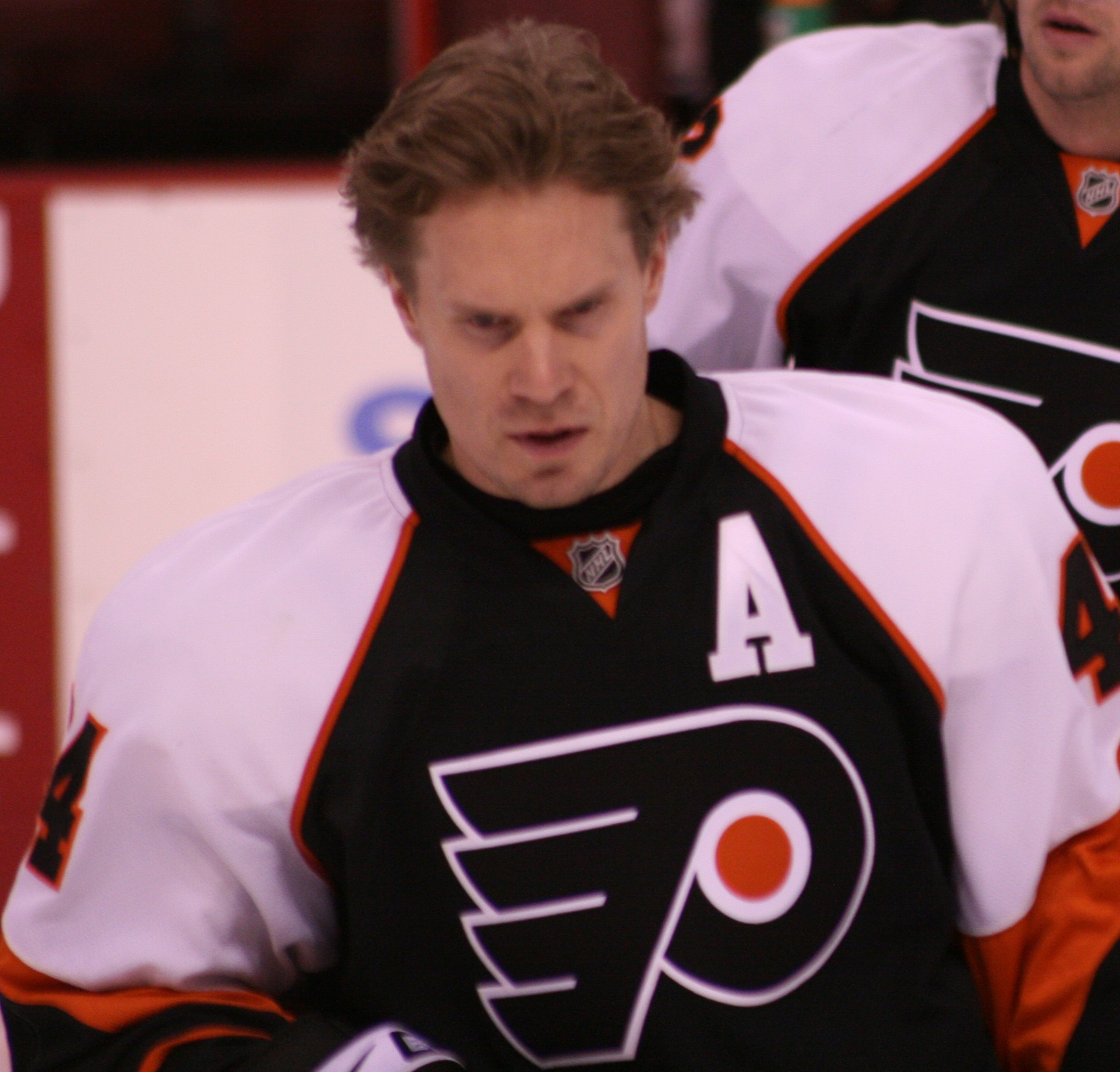
- Timonen with the Philadelphia Flyers in March 2009
- Born: 18 March 1975 (age 51) Kuopio, Finland
- Height: 5 ft 10 in (178 cm)
- Weight: 194 lb (88 kg; 13 st 12 lb)
- Position: Defense
- Shot: Left
- Played for: KalPa; TPS; HIFK; Nashville Predators; HC Lugano; Brynäs IF; Philadelphia Flyers; Chicago Blackhawks
- National team: Finland
- NHL draft: 250th overall, 1993; Los Angeles Kings
- Playing career: 1991–2015

Kimmo Samuel Timonen (born 18 March 1975) is a Finnish former professional ice hockey defenseman who played 16 seasons in the National Hockey League (NHL) for the Nashville Predators, Philadelphia Flyers, and Chicago Blackhawks. Timonen had played in over 1,100 NHL games before retiring. During his career, Timonen had also featured in three IIHF World Junior Championships, seven IIHF World Championships, two World Cups and five Olympic tournaments. He won the Stanley Cup with the Chicago Blackhawks in 2015 in his final career game.

He was inducted into the IIHF Hall of Fame in 2020.

== Playing career ==
Timonen was the youngest player to play for Finland at the 1993 IIHF World Junior Championships at the age of 17. He recorded the second-highest shot total in the tournament with 44.

Timonen was drafted by the Los Angeles Kings in the tenth round, 250th overall, of the 1993 NHL entry draft. After the draft, he continued to play in his native Finland for several years, first for KalPa and then later for TPS. In 1998, Timonen played on the bronze medal-winning Finnish Olympic team in Nagano. Shortly after the Olympics, the Kings traded him, along with Jan Vopat, to the Nashville Predators organization (the team not yet having begun play) in agreement that Nashville would not select Garry Galley in the 1998 NHL Expansion Draft.

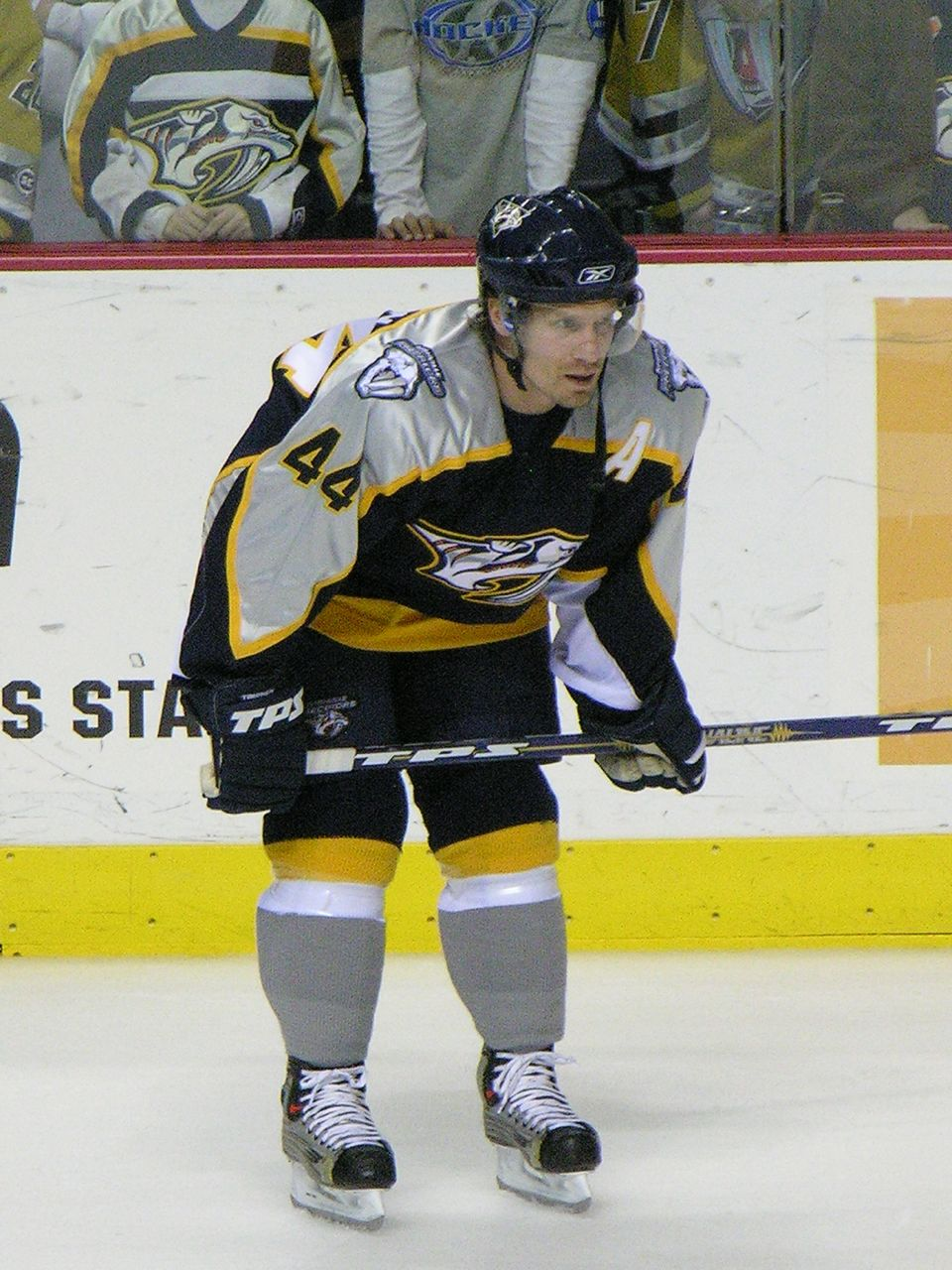
Timonen spent his first eight NHL seasons with the Predators.

=== With the Nashville Predators ===
During the 1998–99 season, Timonen split time between Nashville and their IHL affiliate, the Milwaukee Admirals. The following year, he was promoted to a full-time NHL player. He played the next four seasons for the Predators, steadily improving his offensive output, until the 2004–05 NHL lockout. During the lockout, Timonen played for his hometown team, KalPa, which he partly owns with former Flyers teammate Sami Kapanen. Timonen also persuaded his teammate Adam Hall to play for KalPa for the duration of the lockout.

Timonen represented Finland at the 2004 World Cup of Hockey and led his team in scoring with six points, the fifth-highest total overall in the tournament.

On 3 October 2006, Timonen was named the captain of the Nashville Predators for the 2006–07 season. That season proved to be a career year for Timonen, as he registered career highs in both assists and total points.

=== With the Philadelphia Flyers ===
Following the 2006–07 season, Timonen was traded to the Philadelphia Flyers. Shortly after, he signed a six-year, $37.8 million contract extension with them, a deal which made him the highest paid Finn in the NHL. At the time, Timonen's younger brother Jussi Timonen was playing for the Philadelphia Phantoms, the Flyers' American Hockey League (AHL) affiliate. However, Jussi was subsequently traded to the Dallas Stars early in the 2007–08 season.

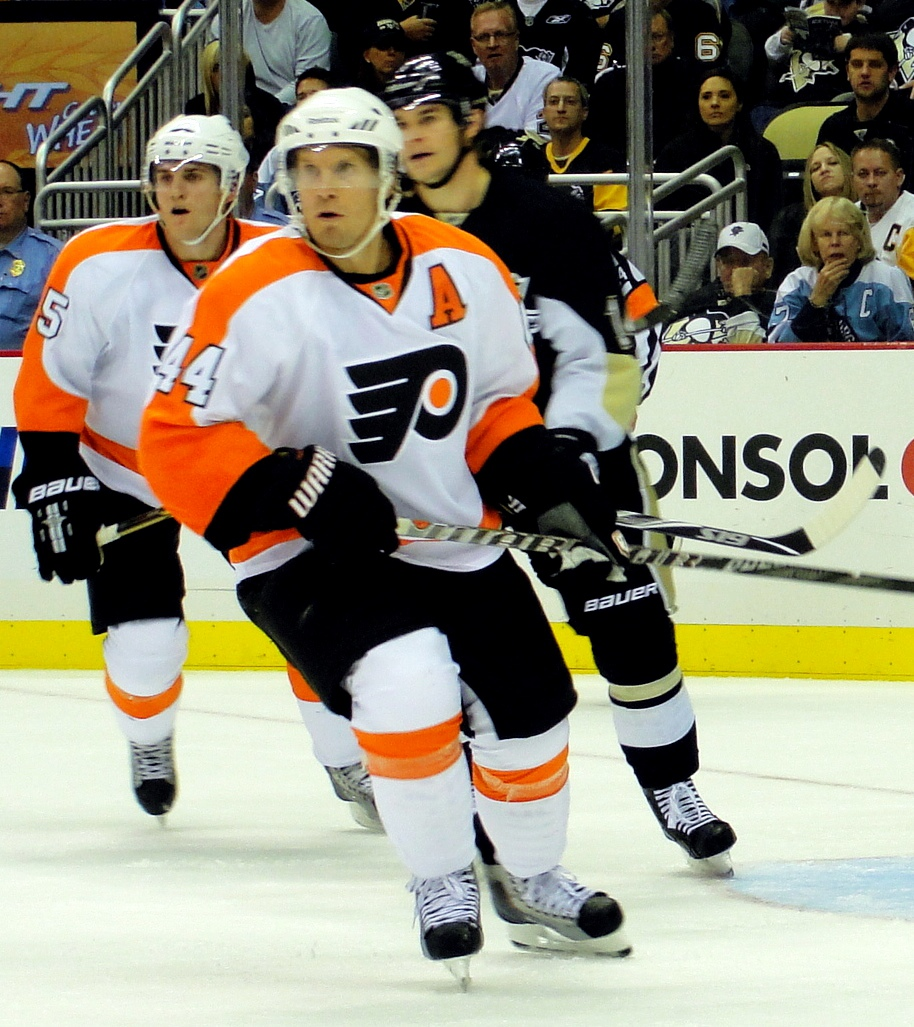
Timonen with the Flyers in October 2010.

The Flyers beat the Washington Capitals 4–3 and the Montreal Canadiens 4–1 in the first two rounds of the 2008 Stanley Cup playoffs. During game four of the Flyers' series with Montreal, Timonen was hit by a wrist shot on his foot by Canadiens defenseman Andrei Markov. Timonen felt numbness in his foot as the week progressed, though believed it to be nothing but a twisted nerve. After an MRI failed to reveal any injury, Timonen had the foot examined at the Hospital of the University of Pennsylvania, where, on 8 May, the doctor found a small blood clot in his foot. He was sidelined indefinitely and missed the first four games of the Eastern Conference Final against the Pittsburgh Penguins. Timonen returned for game five, but the Flyers eventually lost the game and their playoff run came to an end.

In the 2009–10 regular season, Timonen led all NHL defensemen in shorthanded goals scored, with two. That year, Timonen would play in his first ever Stanley Cup Final, though the Flyers would lose to the Chicago Blackhawks in a six-game series.

Timonen scored his 100th career goal on 5 March 2011, against the Buffalo Sabres. He ended the season in a tie with Marc Staal for most shorthanded goals among defensemen, with two.

Timonen recorded his 500th career point with an assist on 1 March 2012, against the New York Islanders. He played his 1,000th NHL game on 18 March 2013, his 37th birthday.

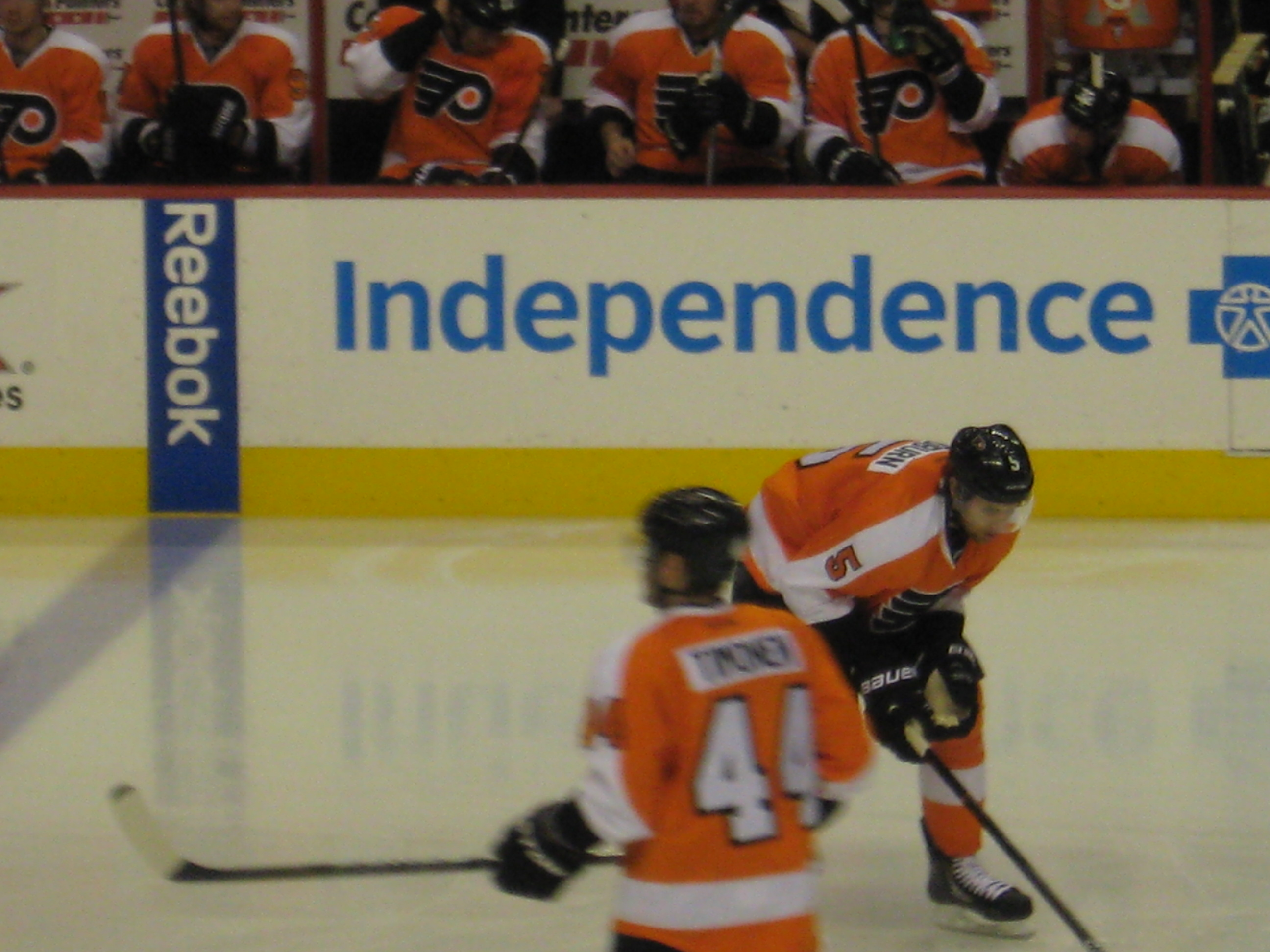
Timonen (left foreground) and Braydon Coburn with the Flyers in March 2014.

=== Blood clots and Stanley Cup victory with the Chicago Blackhawks ===
While preparing for the 2014–15 season, on 5 August 2014, Timonen was diagnosed with blood clots in both of his lungs as well as in his right leg. The serious nature of injury ruled Timonen out indefinitely with the Flyers. Approaching the NHL trade deadline, and returning to health after missing the first 62 games of the season, Timonen was traded by the Flyers to the Chicago Blackhawks in exchange for a 2015 second-round pick and 2016 conditional fourth-round pick on 27 February 2015. He left the Flyers organization as the third most productive defenseman in franchise history, with 270 points in 519 games. On 21 March 2015, he played in his 1,100th NHL game.

On 5 March, Timonen announced his intent to retire from professional hockey after the 2014–15 season. On 15 June, Timonen won his first Stanley Cup with the Blackhawks in the final game of his 20-year career. During the celebration, Timonen was the first player to receive the Stanley Cup following captain Jonathan Toews. Timonen reflected on his career stating, "I was dreaming about this moment for a long time, and it’s right here. This game has given me so much, and I’m relieved, happy, ready to leave this game, and I’m leaving this game as a Stanley Cup champion." He was the last active player in the NHL from the 1993 NHL entry draft.

In February 2016, President Barack Obama received the winning Blackhawks team in the White House. During his speech, he unexpectedly gave Timonen a laudation:

You all know the big names on this team, seven players were here for all three titles, the guys you’ve heard me talk about twice before, so today I actually wanna give the spotlight to two of the unsung heroes on this team, and they're the kind of guys that are behind the scenes of every winning team in sports and beyond. First there is Kimmo Timonen. Now Kimmo already had a great career before last season. He had been to the Stanley Cup final, Olympic final, World Championship final — he had lost them all… [laughter from the audience] … Just telling the truth… [more laughter] … In August he was diagnosed with blood clots in his lungs and his calf, he wasn’t even sure he’d play again. He was traded to Chicago mid-season, fought back on the ice, his final NHL game, at the age of 40, Kimmo finally hoisted the Cup. And that, first of all, as an old guy, it makes me feel good, but it’s also a sign of a great career when somebody who’s just able to stick with it and consistently contribute and make a huge difference, so give Kimmo a big one!

Timonen commented on this to the Finnish state broadcasting company YLE:

This was absolutely a total surprise, and he really made a funny speech, and even to get a mention from him was such an honor for me, and then, of course, when he took a stand on my problems with blood clots, and when you think of what kind of a program I had to go through before I could put my skates on again, it really stirs some powerful feelings in an old man like me, I must admit. And the Stanley Cup victory brought with it some great things that I got to do, and for sure, this was one thing that I absolutely wanted to experience, and I’ll certainly remember this for the rest of my life.

== Personal life ==
Kimmo is married to Johanna Timonen and has 3 children. Kimmo announced his retirement after winning the Stanley Cup in 2015 with the Blackhawks. Timonen owns several restaurants and nightclubs in his hometown of Kuopio.

== Career statistics ==
=== Regular season and playoffs ===
			Regular season					Playoffs
Season	Team	League	GP	G	A	Pts	PIM	GP	G	A	Pts	PIM
1990–91	KalPa	FIN U20	4	0	1	1	2	—	—	—	—	—
1991–92	KalPa	FIN U20	19	3	7	10	2	—	—	—	—	—
1991–92	KalPa	SM-l	5	0	0	0	0	—	—	—	—	—
1992–93	KalPa	FIN U18	3	0	5	5	0	—	—	—	—	—
1992–93	KalPa	FIN.2 U20	6	6	4	10	2	10	3	11	14	8
1992–93	KalPa	SM-l	33	0	2	2	4	—	—	—	—	—
1993–94	KalPa	FIN.2 U20	1	2	1	3	0	4	2	6	8	0
1993–94	KalPa	SM-l	46	6	7	13	55	—	—	—	—	—
1994–95	TPS	FIN U20	1	0	0	0	0	—	—	—	—	—
1994–95	TPS	SM-l	45	3	4	7	10	13	0	1	1	11
1995–96	TPS	SM-l	48	3	21	24	22	9	1	2	3	12
1996–97	TPS	SM-l	50	10	14	24	18	12	2	7	9	8
1997–98	HIFK	SM-l	45	10	15	25	24	9	3	4	7	8
1998–99	Milwaukee Admirals	IHL	29	2	13	15	22	—	—	—	—	—
1998–99	Nashville Predators	NHL	50	4	8	12	30	—	—	—	—	—
1999–2000	Nashville Predators	NHL	51	8	25	33	26	—	—	—	—	—
2000–01	Nashville Predators	NHL	82	12	13	25	50	—	—	—	—	—
2001–02	Nashville Predators	NHL	82	13	29	42	28	—	—	—	—	—
2002–03	Nashville Predators	NHL	72	6	34	40	46	—	—	—	—	—
2003–04	Nashville Predators	NHL	77	12	32	44	52	6	0	0	0	10
2004–05	HC Lugano	NLA	3	0	1	1	0	—	—	—	—	—
2004–05	Brynäs IF	SEL	10	5	3	8	8	—	—	—	—	—
2004–05	KalPa	Mestis	12	4	13	17	6	8	3	7	10	4
2005–06	Nashville Predators	NHL	79	11	39	50	74	5	1	3	4	4
2006–07	Nashville Predators	NHL	80	13	42	55	42	5	0	2	2	4
2007–08	Philadelphia Flyers	NHL	80	8	36	44	50	13	0	6	6	8
2008–09	Philadelphia Flyers	NHL	77	3	40	43	54	6	0	1	1	12
2009–10	Philadelphia Flyers	NHL	82	6	33	39	50	23	1	10	11	20
2010–11	Philadelphia Flyers	NHL	82	6	31	37	36	11	1	5	6	14
2011–12	Philadelphia Flyers	NHL	76	4	39	43	46	11	1	3	4	23
2012–13	Philadelphia Flyers	NHL	45	5	24	29	36	—	—	—	—	—
2013–14	Philadelphia Flyers	NHL	77	6	29	35	32	7	0	1	1	4
2014–15	Chicago Blackhawks	NHL	16	0	0	0	2	18	0	0	0	10
SM-l totals			272	32	63	95	133	43	6	14	20	39
NHL totals			1,108	117	454	571	654	105	4	31	35	109

=== International ===
Medal record

Ice hockey

Representing Finland

Winter Olympics
Silver medal – second place	2006 Turin	
Bronze medal – third place	1998 Nagano	
Bronze medal – third place	2010 Vancouver	
Bronze medal – third place	2014 Sochi	

World Cup
Silver medal – second place	2004 Toronto	

World Championships
Silver medal – second place	1998 Switzerland	
Silver medal – second place	1999 Norway	
Silver medal – second place	2001 Germany	

Year	Team	Event	Result	GP	G	A	Pts	PIM
1992	Finland	EJC	5th	4	0	0	0	0
1993	Finland	WJC	5th	7	2	0	2	6
1993	Finland	EJC	4th	6	2	2	4	2
1994	Finland	WJC	4th	7	3	3	6	4
1995	Finland	WJC	4th	7	2	6	8	4
1996	Finland	WC	5th	6	0	1	1	0
1998	Finland	OG	3rd place, bronze medalist(s)	6	0	1	1	2
1998	Finland	WC	2nd place, silver medalist(s)	10	2	6	8	4
1999	Finland	WC	2nd place, silver medalist(s)	10	1	4	5	6
2001	Finland	WC	2nd place, silver medalist(s)	9	2	2	4	10
2002	Finland	OG	6th	4	0	1	1	2
2002	Finland	WC	4th	9	1	2	3	8
2003	Finland	WC	5th	7	2	5	7	2
2004	Finland	WCH	2nd place, silver medalist(s)	6	1	5	6	2
2005	Finland	WC	7th	6	2	1	3	6
2006	Finland	OG	2nd place, silver medalist(s)	8	1	4	5	2
2010	Finland	OG	3rd place, bronze medalist(s)	6	2	2	4	2
2014	Finland	OG	3rd place, bronze medalist(s)	6	0	2	2	0
Junior totals				31	9	11	20	16
Senior totals				93	14	36	50	46

== Awards ==
- 1994 - First Team All-Star selection at the World Junior Ice Hockey Championships
- 1997 - Matti Keinonen trophy for best +/- in the SM-liiga
- Two-time Kanada-malja champion - 1995, 1998 (TPS and HIFK)
- 2005 - Elected most valuable player in the Mestis playoffs
- 2005 - Mestis champion (KalPa)
- Named to NHL All-Star Game: 2000 (unable to play due to injury), 2004, 2007, 2008, 2012
- Five-time Barry Ashbee Trophy winner as Philadelphia Flyers best defenseman – 2008, 2009, 2012, 2013, 2014
- 2015 - Stanley Cup champion (Chicago Blackhawks)
- KalPa #44 jersey retired 2016
- 2020 IIHF Hall of Fame inductee. The induction ceremony was scheduled during the 2020 IIHF World Championship, but was delayed due to the COVID-19 pandemic. The IIHF Hall of Fame class of 2020/2022 was inducted during the 2022 IIHF World Championship.

== See also ==
- List of NHL players with 1,000 games played

Preceded by Petri Varis	Winner of the Matti Keinonen trophy 1996–97	Succeeded by Olli Jokinen
Preceded by Greg Johnson	Nashville Predators captain 2006–2007	Succeeded by Jason Arnott
