= Jan Smolík =

Czech cyclist (born 1942)

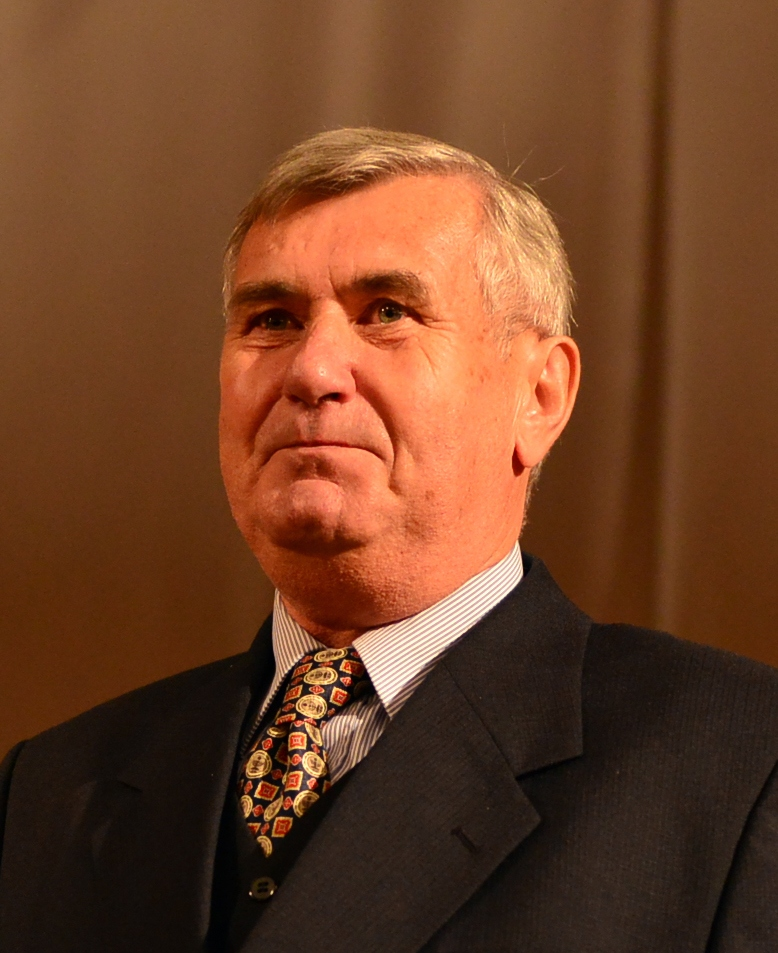
- Smolík in 2013

Personal information
- Born: 24 December 1942 (age 83) Lipník nad Bečvou, Protectorate of Bohemia and Moravia

Cycling career
- Sport: Cycling

Jan Smolík (born 24 December 1942) is a Czech former cyclist. His sporting career began with Dukla Brno. He competed at the 1964 Tokyo and 1968 Mexico City Summer Olympics. He won the Peace Race in 1964.
