= Jiří Zelenka =

Czech ice hockey player

- Born: August 17, 1972 (age 53) Prague, Czechoslovakia
- Height: 5 ft 10 in (178 cm)
- Weight: 187 lb (85 kg; 13 st 5 lb)
- Position: Right wing
- Shot: Left
- Played for: HC Sparta Praha; Blues; Wölfe Freiburg; HC Plzeň
- National team: Czech Republic
- Playing career: 1990–2009; 2012–2014

Jiří Zelenka (born 17 August 1972) is a Czech ice hockey forward. He played 15 seasons for HC Sparta Praha.

== Career ==
Zelenka scored 69 goals in Czechoslovak Extraliga and 199 goals in Czech Extraliga.

Zelenka played 24 games and scored 13 goals in Euroleague.
