= UCI Road World Championships – Men's team time trial =

World championship team time trial race

Race details
- Date: End of season
- Discipline: Team time trial
- Type: One-day
- Organiser: UCI

History
- First edition: 1962
- Editions: 34
- Final edition: 2018
- First winner: Italy
- Most wins: Italy (7 times)
- Final winner: Quick-Step Floors

The UCI Road World Championships – Men's team time trial was a world championship for road bicycle racing in the discipline of team time trial (TTT). It was organized by the world governing body, the Union Cycliste Internationale (UCI).

The mixed team relay replaced the men's and women's team time trial events at the world championships from 2019.

== National teams (1962–1994) ==
A championship for national teams was introduced in 1962 and held until 1994. It was held annually, except that from 1972 onward, the TTT was not held in Olympic years. There were 4 riders per team on a route around 100 kilometres long. Italy is the most successful nation with seven victories.

=== Medal winners ===
Championships	Gold	Silver	Bronze
1962 Salò	Italy; Mario Maino; Antonio Tagliani; Dino Zandegù; Danilo Grassi	Denmark; Ole Ritter; Vagn Bangsburg; Mogens Twilling; Ole Kroier	Uruguay; Rubén Etchebarne; Juan José Timón; Vid Cencic; Rene Pezzati
1963 Ronse	France; Michel Bechet; Dominique Motte; Marcel-Ernest Bidault; Georges Chappe	Italy; Mario Maino; Pasquale Fabbri; Danilo Grassi; Dino Zandegù	Soviet Union; Viktor Kapitonov; Gainan Saidschushin; Yuri Melichov; Anatoli Olizarenko
1964 Sallanches	Italy; Severino Andreoli; Luciano Dalla Bona; Pietro Guerra; Ferruccio Manza	Spain; Ginés García; Jose-Ramon Goyeneche; Ramón Sáez; Luis Pedro Santamarina	Belgium; Rene Heuvelmans; Roland de Neve; Roland Van De Rijse; Albert Van Vlierberghe
1965 Lasarte	Italy; Pietro Guerra; Luciano Dalla Bona; Mino Denti; Giuseppe Soldi	Spain; Ventura Díaz; José Manuel López; José Manuel Lasa; Domingo Perurena	France; André Desvages; Gerard Swertvaeger; Henri Heintz; Claude Lechatelier
1966 Adenau	Denmark; Werner Blaudzun; Jørgen Hansen; Ole Hojlund; Flemming Wisborg	Netherlands; Eddy Beugels; Tiemen Groen; Harry Steevens; Rini Wagtmans	Italy; Attilio Benfatto; Luciano Dalla Bona; Mino Denti; Pietro Guerra
1967 Heerlen	Sweden; Erik Pettersson; Gösta Pettersson; Sture Pettersson; Tomas Pettersson	Denmark; Werner Blaudzun; Jørgen Hansen; Leif Mortensen; Henning Pedersen	Italy; Lorenzo Bosisio; Benito Pigato; Vittorio Marcelli; Flavio Martini
1968 Imola	Sweden; Erik Pettersson; Gösta Pettersson; Sture Pettersson; Tomas Pettersson	Switzerland; Bruno Hubschmid; Robert Thalmann; Walter Burki; Erich Spahn	Italy; Vittorio Marcelli; Flavio Martini; Giovanni Bramucci; Benito Pigato
1969 Zolder	Sweden; Erik Pettersson; Gösta Pettersson; Sture Pettersson; Tomas Pettersson	Denmark; Mogens Frey; Jørgen Hansen; Joergen Lund; Leif Mortensen	Switzerland; Xaver Kurmann; Bruno Hubschmid; Josef Fuchs; Walter Burki
1970 Leicester	Soviet Union; Valery Yardy; Viktor Sokolov; Boris Shoukov; Valeri Likatchev	Czechoslovakia; Jiří Mainuš; Frantisek Rezac; Milan Puzrla; Petr Matoušek	Netherlands; Fedor den Hertog; Popke Oosterhof; Tino Tabak; Adri Duycker
1971 Mendrisio	Belgium; Gustaaf Hermans; Gustaaf Van Cauter; Louis Verreydt; Ludo Van Der Linden	Netherlands; Fedor den Hertog; Adri Duycker; Frits Schur; Aad van den Hoek	Poland; Edward Barcik; Stanisław Szozda; Jan Smyrak; Lucjan Lis
1973 Barcelona	Poland; Lucjan Lis; Ryszard Szurkowski; Stanisław Szozda; Tadeusz Mytnik	Soviet Union; Gennady Komnatov; Youri Mikhailov; Boris Shoukov; Sergey Sinizin	Sweden; Tord Filipsson; Lennart Fagerlund; Leif Hansson; Sven-Åke Nilsson
1974 Montréal	Sweden; Lennart Fagerlund; Bernt Johansson; Tord Filipsson; Sven-Åke Nilsson	Soviet Union; Gennady Komnatov; Rinat Szarafaoulin; Vladimir Kaminski; Valery Chaplygin	East Germany; Hans-Joachim Hartnick; Karl Dietrich Diers; Horst Tischoff; Gerhard Lauke
1975 Yvoir	Poland; Tadeusz Mytnik; Mieczysław Nowicki; Ryszard Szurkowski; Stanisław Szozda	Soviet Union; Gennady Komnatov; Valery Chaplygin; Aavo Pikkuus; Vladimir Kaminski	Czechoslovakia; Petr Matoušek; Vlastimil Moravec; Vladimír Vondráček; Petr Bucháček
1977 San Cristóbal	Soviet Union; Valery Chaplygin; Aavo Pikkuus; Vladimir Kaminski; Anatoli Chukanov	Italy; Mirko Bernardi; Mauro De Pellegrini; Vito Da Ros; Dino Porrini	Poland; Tadeusz Mytnik; Mieczysław Nowicki; Stanisław Szozda; Czesław Lang
1978 Adenau	Netherlands; Guus Bierings; Bert Oosterbosch; Bart van Est; Jan van Houwelingen	Soviet Union; Aavo Pikkuus; Vladimir Kaminski; Algimantas Guzevičius; Vladimir Kouznetsov	Switzerland; Gilbert Glaus; Stefan Mutter; Richard Trinkler; Kurt Ehrensperger
1979 Valkenburg	East Germany; Bernd Drogan; Hans-Joachim Hartnick; Andreas Petermann; Falk Boden	Poland; Jan Jankiewicz; Czesław Lang; Stefan Ciekanski; Witold Plutecki	Norway; Geir Digerud; Morten Sæther; Jostein Wilmann; Hans Petter Ødegård
1981 Praha	East Germany; Falk Boden; Bernd Drogan; Mario Kummer; Olaf Ludwig	Soviet Union; Youri Kashirin; Oleg Logvin; Sergej Kadazki; Anatoli Yarkin	Czechoslovakia; Milan Jurčo; Michal Klasa; Alipi Kostadinov; Jiří Škoda
1982 Goodwood	Netherlands; Maarten Ducrot; Gerard Schipper; Gerrit Solleveld; Frits van Bindsbergen	Switzerland; Alfred Achermann; Daniel Heggli; Richard Trinkler; Urs Zimmermann	Soviet Union; Youri Kashirin; Oleg Logvin; Sergej Voronin; Oleg Tchugda
1983 Altenrhein	Soviet Union; Youri Kashirin; Sergej Novolokin; Oleg Tchugda; Alexandre Zinoviev	Switzerland; Daniel Heggli; Heinz Imboden; Othmar Haefliger; Benno Wiss	Norway; Terje Gjengaar; Dag Hopen; Hans Petter Ødegård; Tom Pedersen
1985 Giavera del Montello	Soviet Union; Vassili Jdanov; Viktor Klimov; Igor Sumnikov; Alexandre Zinoviev	Czechoslovakia; Vladimir Hruza; Milan Jurčo; Michal Klasa; Milan Křen	Italy; Marcello Bartalini; Massimo Podenzana; Eros Poli; Claudio Vandelli
1986 Colorado Springs	Netherlands; Tom Cordes; Gerrit de Vries; John Talen; Rob Harmeling	Italy; Eros Poli; Massimo Podenzana; Mario Scirea; Flavio Vanzella	East Germany; Uwe Ampler; Uwe Raab; Mario Kummer; Dan Radtke
1987 Villach	Italy; Roberto Fortunato; Eros Poli; Mario Scirea; Flavio Vanzella	Soviet Union; Viktor Klimov; Asiat Saitov; Igor Sumnikov; Evgueni Zagrebelny	Austria; Helmut Wechselberger; Bernhard Rassinger; Mario Traxl; Johann Lienhart
1989 Chambéry	East Germany; Mario Kummer; Maik Landsmann; Jan Schur; Falk Boden	Poland; Zenon Jaskuła; Joachim Halupczok; Marek Leśniewski; Andrzej Sypytkowski	Soviet Union; Youri Manouylov; Viktor Klimov; Evgueni Zagrebelny; Oleg Galkin
1990 Utsunomiya	Soviet Union; Oleg Galkin; Rouslan Zotov; Igor Patenko; Alexander Markovich	East Germany; Maik Landsmann; Uwe Peschel; Uwe Berndt; Falk Boden	West Germany; Rolf Aldag; Kai Hundertmarck; Rajmund Lehnert; Michael Rich
1991 Stuttgart	Italy; Flavio Anastasia; Luca Colombo; Gianfranco Contri; Andrea Peron	Germany; Uwe Berndt; Bernd Dittert; Uwe Peschel; Michael Rich	Norway; Stig Kristiansen; Johnny Sæther; Roar Skaane; Bjørn Stenersen
1993 Oslo	Italy; Cristian Salvato; Gianfranco Contri; Rossano Brasi; Rosario Fina	Germany; Christian Meyer; Uwe Peschel; Michael Rich; Andreas Walzer	Switzerland; Roman Jeker; Beat Meister; Markus Kennel; Roland Meier
1994 Agrigento	Italy; Cristian Salvato; Gianfranco Contri; Gianluca Colombo; Dario Andriotto	France; Jean-François Anti; Dominique Bozzi; Pascal Deramé; Christophe Moreau	Germany; Ralf Grabsch; Uwe Peschel; Michael Rich; Jan Schaffrath

=== Medals by nation ===
Rank	Nation	Gold	Silver	Bronze	Total
1	Italy (ITA)	7	3	4	14
2	Soviet Union (URS)	5	6	3	14
3	Sweden (SWE)	4	0	1	5
4	Netherlands (NED)	3	2	1	6
5	East Germany (DDR)	3	1	2	6
6	Poland (POL)	2	2	2	6
7	Denmark (DEN)	1	3	0	4
8	France (FRA)	1	1	1	3
9	Belgium (BEL)	1	0	1	2
10	Switzerland (SUI)	0	3	3	6
11	Czechoslovakia (TCH)	0	2	2	4
11	Germany (GER)	0	2	2	4
13	Spain (ESP)	0	2	0	2
14	Norway (NOR)	0	0	3	3
15	Austria (AUT)	0	0	1	1
15	Uruguay (URU)	0	0	1	1
Totals (16 entries)		27	27	27	81

=== Most successful riders ===
Rank	Rider	Gold	Silver	Bronze	Total
1	Falk Boden (DDR)	3	1	0	4
2	Gianfranco Contri (ITA); Erik Pettersson (SWE); Gösta Pettersson (SWE); Sture Pettersson (SWE); Tomas Pettersson (SWE)	3	0	0	3
7	Stanisław Szozda (POL)	2	0	2	4
8	Luciano Dalla Bona (ITA); Pietro Guerra (ITA); Mario Kummer (DDR); Tadeusz Mytnik (POL)	2	0	1	3

== UCI teams (2012–2018) ==
There was a long break until a championship for trade teams was introduced in 2012. There were 6 riders per team. The championship was held up to 2018.

=== Medal winners ===
Championships	Gold	Silver	Bronze
2012 Valkenburg	(Belgium) Omega Pharma–Quick-Step	(United States) BMC Racing Team	(Australia) Orica–GreenEDGE
2012 Valkenburg	Tom Boonen (BEL); Sylvain Chavanel (FRA); Tony Martin (GER); Niki Terpstra (NED); Kristof Vandewalle (BEL); Peter Velits (SVK)	Alessandro Ballan (ITA); Philippe Gilbert (BEL); Taylor Phinney (USA); Marco Pinotti (ITA); Manuel Quinziato (ITA); Tejay van Garderen (USA)	Sam Bewley (NZL); Luke Durbridge (AUS); Sebastian Langeveld (NED); Cameron Meyer (AUS); Jens Mouris (NED); Svein Tuft (CAN)
2013 Florence	(Belgium) Omega Pharma–Quick-Step	(Australia) Orica–GreenEDGE	(United Kingdom) Team Sky
2013 Florence	Sylvain Chavanel (FRA); Michał Kwiatkowski (POL); Tony Martin (GER); Niki Terpstra (NED); Kristof Vandewalle (BEL); Peter Velits (SVK)	Luke Durbridge (AUS); Michael Hepburn (AUS); Daryl Impey (RSA); Brett Lancaster (AUS); Jens Mouris (NED); Svein Tuft (CAN)	Edvald Boasson Hagen (NOR); Chris Froome (GBR); Vasil Kiryienka (BLR); Richie Porte (AUS); Kanstantsin Sivtsov (BLR); Geraint Thomas (GBR)
2014 Ponferrada	(United States) BMC Racing Team	(Australia) Orica–GreenEDGE	(Belgium) Omega Pharma–Quick-Step
2014 Ponferrada	Rohan Dennis (AUS); Silvan Dillier (SUI); Daniel Oss (ITA); Manuel Quinziato (ITA); Tejay van Garderen (USA); Peter Velits (SVK)	Luke Durbridge (AUS); Michael Hepburn (AUS); Damien Howson (AUS); Brett Lancaster (AUS); Jens Mouris (NED); Svein Tuft (CAN)	Tom Boonen (BEL); Michał Kwiatkowski (POL); Tony Martin (GER); Pieter Serry (BEL); Niki Terpstra (NED); Julien Vermote (BEL)
2015 Richmond	(United States) BMC Racing Team	(Belgium) Etixx–Quick-Step	(Spain) Movistar Team
2015 Richmond	Rohan Dennis (AUS); Silvan Dillier (SUI); Stefan Küng (SUI); Daniel Oss (ITA); Taylor Phinney (USA); Manuel Quinziato (ITA)	Tom Boonen (BEL); Michał Kwiatkowski (POL); Yves Lampaert (BEL); Tony Martin (GER); Niki Terpstra (NED); Rigoberto Urán (COL)	Andrey Amador (CRC); Jonathan Castroviejo (ESP); Alex Dowsett (GBR); Jon Izagirre (ESP); Adriano Malori (ITA); Jasha Sütterlin (GER)
2016 Doha	(Belgium) Etixx–Quick-Step	(United States) BMC Racing Team	(Australia) Orica–BikeExchange
2016 Doha	Bob Jungels (LUX); Marcel Kittel (GER); Yves Lampaert (BEL); Tony Martin (GER); Niki Terpstra (NED); Julien Vermote (BEL)	Rohan Dennis (AUS); Stefan Küng (SUI); Daniel Oss (ITA); Taylor Phinney (USA); Manuel Quinziato (ITA); Joey Rosskopf (USA)	Luke Durbridge (AUS); Alex Edmondson (AUS); Michael Hepburn (AUS); Daryl Impey (RSA); Michael Matthews (AUS); Svein Tuft (CAN)
2017 Bergen	(Germany) Team Sunweb	(United States) BMC Racing Team	(United Kingdom) Team Sky
2017 Bergen	Tom Dumoulin (NED); Lennard Kämna (GER); Wilco Kelderman (NED); Søren Kragh Andersen (DEN); Michael Matthews (AUS); Sam Oomen (NED)	Rohan Dennis (AUS); Silvan Dillier (SUI); Stefan Küng (SUI); Daniel Oss (ITA); Miles Scotson (AUS); Tejay van Garderen (USA)	Owain Doull (GBR); Chris Froome (GBR); Vasil Kiryienka (BLR); Michał Kwiatkowski (POL); Gianni Moscon (ITA); Geraint Thomas (GBR)
2018 Innsbruck	(Belgium) Quick-Step Floors	(Germany) Team Sunweb	(United States) BMC Racing Team
2018 Innsbruck	Kasper Asgreen (DEN); Laurens De Plus (BEL); Bob Jungels (LUX); Yves Lampaert (BEL); Maximilian Schachmann (GER); Niki Terpstra (NED)	Tom Dumoulin (NED); Chad Haga (USA); Wilco Kelderman (NED); Søren Kragh Andersen (DEN); Michael Matthews (AUS); Sam Oomen (NED)	Patrick Bevin (NZL); Damiano Caruso (ITA); Rohan Dennis (AUS); Stefan Küng (SUI); Greg Van Avermaet (BEL); Tejay van Garderen (USA)

=== Most successful teams ===
Rank	Team	Gold	Silver	Bronze	Total
1	(Belgium) Quick-Step	4	1	1	6
2	(United States) BMC Racing Team	2	3	1	6
3	(Germany) Team Sunweb	1	1	0	2
4	(Australia) Mitchelton–Scott	0	2	2	4
5	(United Kingdom) Ineos Grenadiers	0	0	2	2
6	(Spain) Movistar Team	0	0	1	1

=== Most successful riders ===
Rank	Rider	Team(s)	Gold	Silver	Bronze	Total
1	Niki Terpstra (NED)	Quick-Step (2012–2016, 2018)	4	1	1	6
2	Tony Martin (GER)	Quick-Step (2012–2016)	3	1	1	5
3	Peter Velits (SVK)	Quick-Step (2012–2013), BMC Racing Team (2014)	3	0	0	3
4	Rohan Dennis (AUS)	BMC Racing Team (2014–2018)	2	2	1	5
5	Daniel Oss (ITA)	BMC Racing Team (2014–2017)	2	2	0	4
5	Manuel Quinziato (ITA)	BMC Racing Team (2012, 2014–2016)	2	2	0	4
7	Silvan Dillier (SUI)	BMC Racing Team (2014–2015, 2017)	2	1	0	3
7	Yves Lampaert (BEL)	Quick-Step (2015–2016, 2018)	2	1	0	3
9	Sylvain Chavanel (FRA)	Quick-Step (2012–2013)	2	0	0	2
9	Bob Jungels (LUX)	Quick-Step (2016, 2018)	2	0	0	2
9	Kristof Vandewalle (BEL)	Quick-Step (2012–2013)	2	0	0	2
