= Stelbel =

Italian bicycle manufacturer

- Type: Private
- Industry: Bicycle industry
- Founded: 1973; 53 years ago
- Founder: Stelio Belletti
- Headquarters: Bergamo, Italy
- Area served: Worldwide
- Products: Bicycles and Bicycle frame
- Website: www.stelbel.it

Stelbel (short for Stelio Belletti) is an Italian manufacturer of racing bicycles, founded in 1973 by Stelio Belletti.

== History ==
=== The origins of the brand ===
After World War II, Stelio Belletti joined his father, Antenore, in his workshop in via Giovanni Antonio Amadeo, in the Ortica district of Milan. The mechanical workshop specialized in the construction of frames and other metal tubing structures. During the 1950s and 1960s, the Belletti Workshop collaborated significantly with important Aeronaticaul and motorcycle companies in Italy. It was one of the first companies in Italy to own and operate a TIG welding machine.

=== The Stelbel Brand ===
Stelio Belletti has always been a huge cycling fan and as a boy was part of local amateur cycling teams. Since the early 1970s, his experience as a welder fabricating motorcycle frames and aircraft fuselages pushed him to begin experimenting with the production of bicycle frames, combining steel tubing with TIG welding which at the time was a new technique in the bicycle industry. Encouraged by his father and by the results he had obtained, in the spring of 1973 he decided to found the Stelbel brand, allowing him to distinguish the production of racing bicycle frames from the other activities carried out in the family workshop. The frames were produced in Via Alessandro Manzoni, 1 in Lucino, a fraction of Rodano in the province of Milan.

=== First Stelbel Patent ===
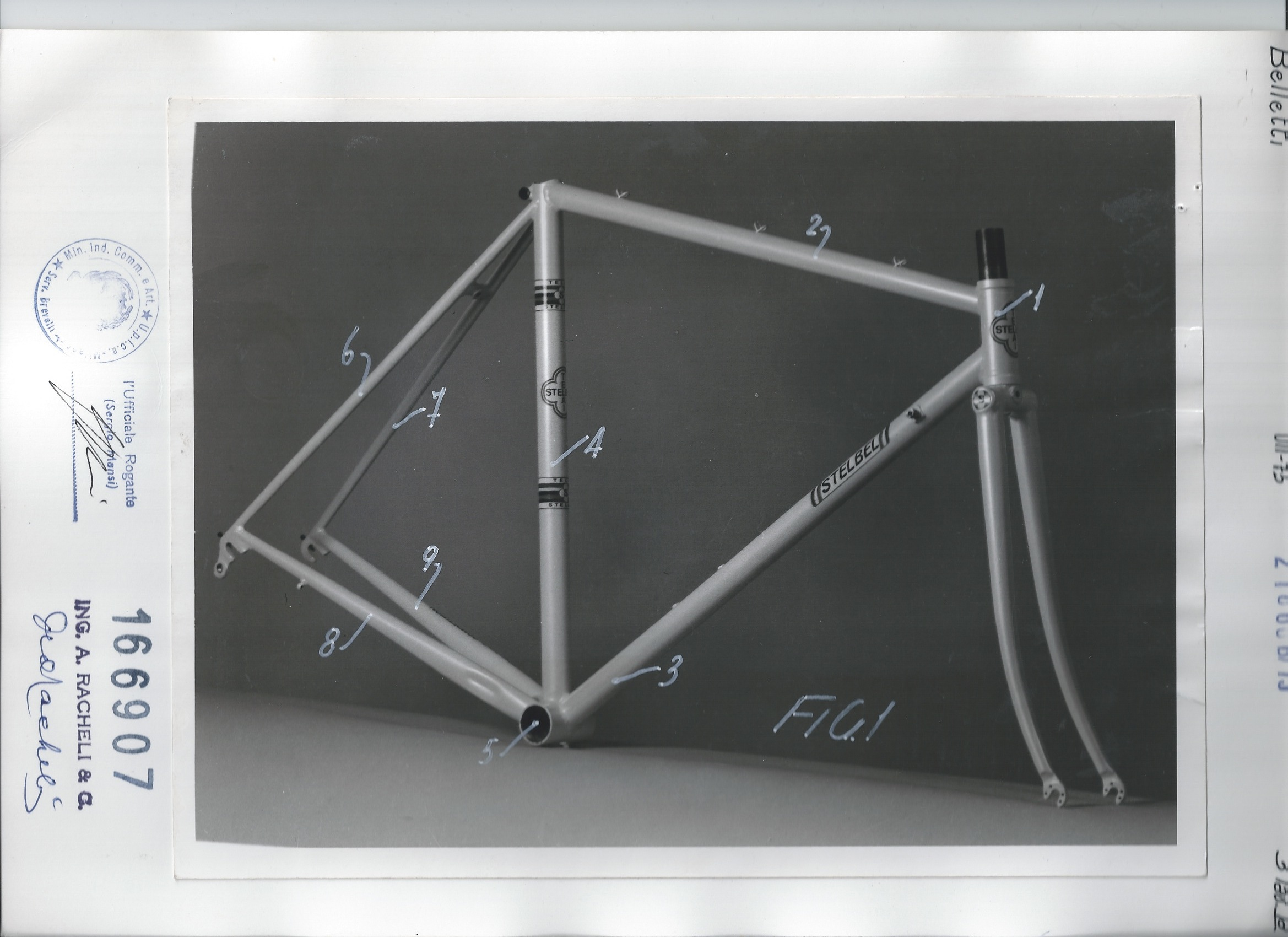
photo attached to the original documentation of the first Stelbel patent – Modello Integrale

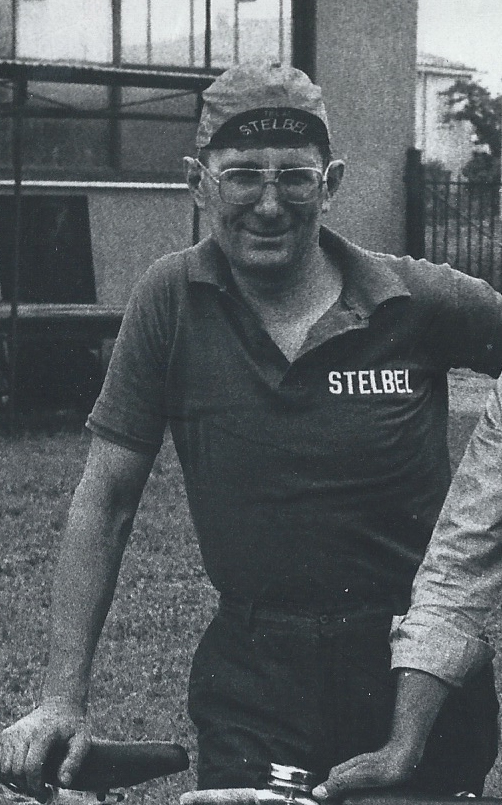
Stelio Belletti in 1979

Using the knowledge he had acquired as a mechanic, builder and welder, coupled with his experiences as a bicycle racer, Belletti began to work on the production of a frame model that would encompass all the technological advances he had witnessed in his time. The racing frame model he created was patented in 1975 and called the "Integrale" model. The title on the patent states: Bicycle frame designed for competition with at least a portion of the tubes directly joined through a welding process.

Source: Central Patent Office – Patent N. 166907

The patent description illustrates in detail how the steel tubing is joined to create a frame through a TIG welding process that uses a non-consumable tungsten electrode to produce the weld, which is protected during the welding process by an inert shielding gas (Argon).

=== Gold medal at the 1975 UCI World Road Championships ===
In August 1975, the UCI World Road Championships were held in Mettet and Yvoir, Belgium. For the Championships, the Polish national cycling team was provided with Stelbel frames built specially for the event. It was the debut of Stelio Belletti's product in an international competition. Belletti made 6 frames (4 official frames plus 2 reserve frames) for the team time trial race and another six frames for the men's road race. The Polish team was made up by racers Tadeusz Mytnik, Mieczysław Nowicki, Ryszard Szurkowski and Stanisław Szozda who, racing on Stelbel frames, won the gold medal for the team time trial race.

=== Late 1970s ===
Encouraged by the positive results of his frames, Stelio Belletti completely renounced all other commitments and began to focus solely on building racing bicycle frames. During the late 1970s, Stelbel frames continued to evolve, becoming increasingly refined and sophisticated, both in terms of technique and aesthetics. In particular, Belletti developed his concept of a fork crown produced in-house, which went on to become a hallmark of Stelbel frames. The development of the fork crown involved a distinctive production process and did not use any prefabricated components. The construction of the first Strada model dates back to 1979, and saw the end of the Integrale model.

=== 1980s ===
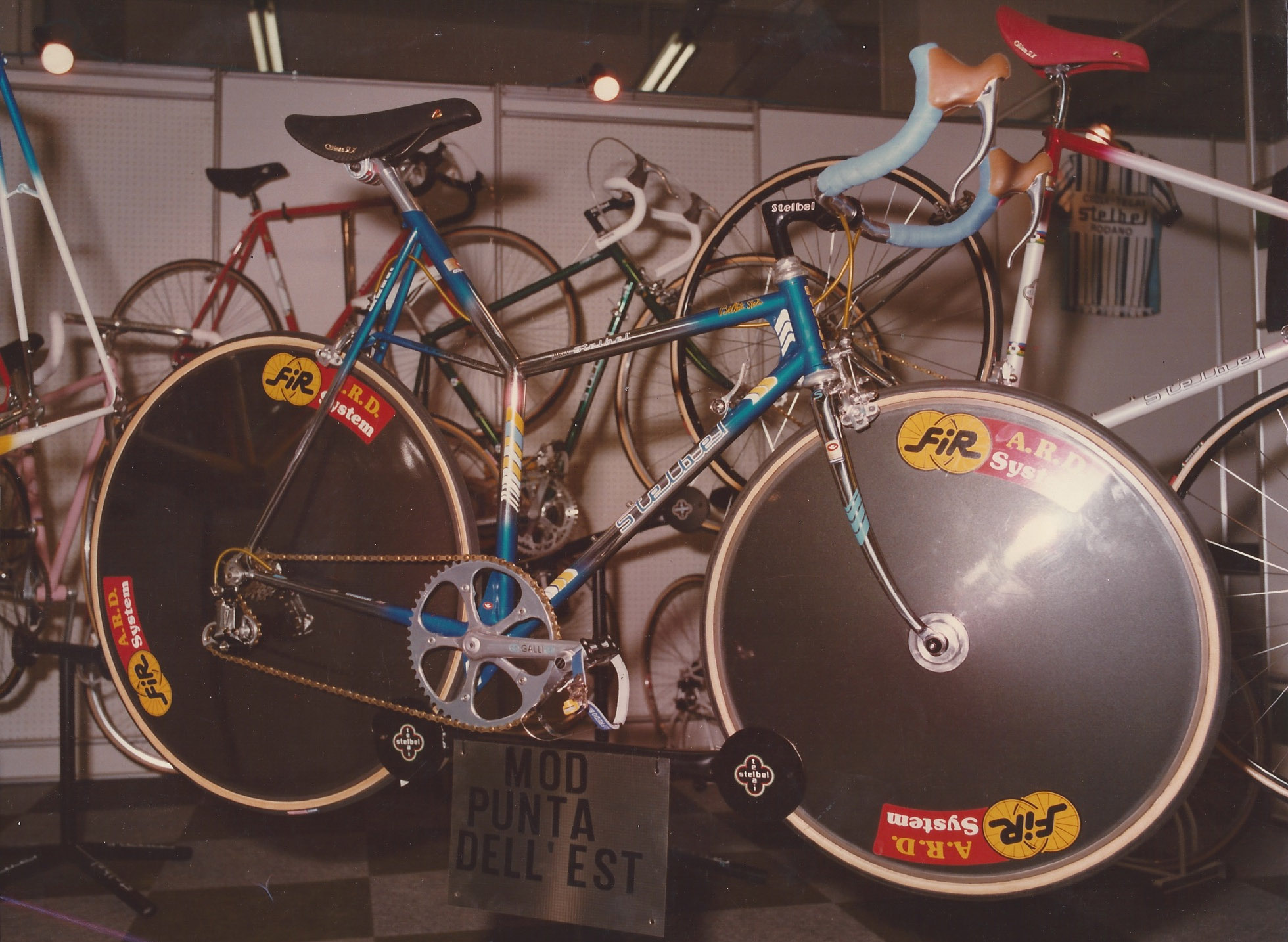
"The "Punta dell’Est" model on display at the Stelbel booth at the "Fiera del Ciclo di Milano" in 1985

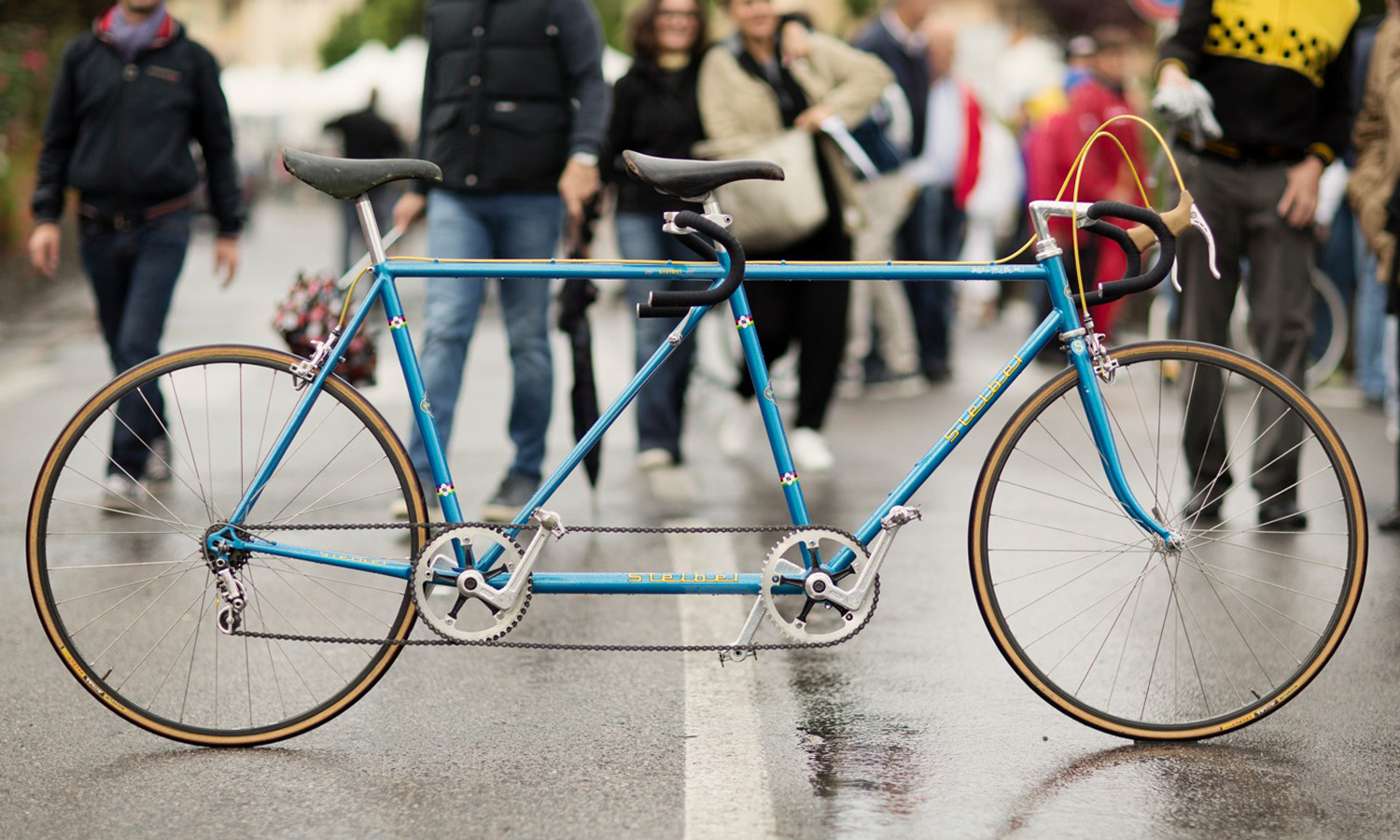
Stelbel Tandem

In the 1980s, as the demand for Stelbel products continued to grow, new models were added to the catalogue and the company hired its first employees. Stelbel began to focus on building time trial frames that featured aerodynamic solutions and were aesthetically pleasing. These years saw the production of the Dynamic frame model (with aerodynamic characteristics) and an experimental model called the Punta dell’Est, which had an atypical shape for a frame at the time. The Punta dell'Est model was the main attraction at the Stelbel booth during the "Fiera del Ciclo di Milano" in 1985. Emblazoned above the booth was the slogan: "Stelbel" – Argon T.I.G. lugless welded frames. Over the course of the 1980s, the internally produced fork crown underwent several modifications and improvements, but it remains one of the most distinctive features of the Stelbel brand. The first experiments with stainless steel frames date back to 1983–1984. The diameter and thickness of the tubes available on the market were not appropriate for constructing bicycle frames and consequently were custom ordered from a steel mill in the province of Milan. Since 1983, the company adopted a serial numbering system for their frames. Five consecutive numbers were punched into the underside of the bottom bracket, where the first two numbers indicate the year of production. The serial number on the frame should not be confused with the frame dimensions, which were also punched into the underside of the bottom bracket as early on as the mid-1970s.

=== Company closes in 1990 ===
The evolution of Stelbel frames continued unabated until 1990, arriving at the production of aluminum frames and the first mountain bikes in Italy. That year, due to problems of a private nature, Stelio Belletti was forced to close his doors with very little notice.

=== Relaunch in 2015 ===
In September 2013 talks were held to take Stelbel frames in production again. Thanks to a collaboration between Cicli Corsa and Stelio Belletti, a new range of Stelbel frames is available.

== Production ==
Historically notable models

| Model | Year of production |
|---|---|
| Integrale | From 1973 to 1980. Restarted production in 2015. |
| Pista | From 1975 to 1990 |
| Strada | From 1979 to 1990 |
| Strada Super | From 1982 to 1990 |
| Cronotime | From 1982 to 1985 |
| Punta dell'Est | From 1983 to 1988 |
| Dynamic | From 1983 to 1990 |
| Cronosquadra | From 1984 to 1990 |
| Inox | From 1983 to 1988 |
| Cross | From 1975 to 1990 |
| Tandem | From 1977 to 1990 |
| SB/03 | From 2015 |
| Rodano | From 2015 |
| Ortica | From 2015 |

== Interesting facts ==
Stelio Belletti decided to begin constructing bicycle frames after an unfortunate incident with a racing bicycle he had purchased in Milan. The bicycle frame, according to Stelio Belletti, proved to be unbalanced and not properly aligned. Since the bicycle dealer was not in agreement with his opinion, Belletti decided to solve the problem himself by building his own bicycle frame. This was in 1970.

The time trial bikes that were supplied to the Polish team in 1975 for the UCI World Road Championships were built with extremely thin, light steel tubing made specifically for that particular type of racing. Stelio Belletti recommended that they not use the frames during the Road Race, which was a longer course with rougher terrain than the team time trial race, and made them 6 sturdier frames specifically for the occasion. Amazed by how lightweight the time trial frames were, the team ignored his recommendations and rode both races with the time trial bikes, not taking into consideration the risks. Fortunately, the frames remained intact for both races.

Recently, news has spread that the Polish national cycling team won the Los Angeles Olympics in 1984 riding Stelbel bicycles. This false report is a result of a misunderstanding during an interview with Stelio Belletti in 2011, who was instead referring to the team's victory at the 1975 UCI Road World Championships. The error was reported online by multiple sources. Belletti corrected this information in 2013.

The name of the Punta dell’Est model is inspired by an area where time trial teams supplied with Stelbel frames would go to train in the 80s. At the time, teams would frequently train on the roads around the seaplane base in Milan. The northeast side of the artificial lake was known at the time as "Punta dell'Est" [the eastern point], and used by cyclists as a meeting point.

Some English names were used to identify a few of the models produced by Stebel, the result of which was a number of grammatical errors, most easily seen in the Dynamic line. In fact, some models bear the name "Dinamic", "Dinamics" or even "Dynamics". Only a few models have the correct name, "Dynamic". Even the English translation of "telai originali Stelbel" (original Stelbel frames, a frequently used slogan) was translated incorrectly, omitting the letters "e" and "s" from the word "Frames", translating the slogan as "Stelbel Original Fram".

== See also ==
- List of bicycle parts
- List of Italian companies

== Links ==
- Official Stelbel website
- Stelbel on ClassicRendezVous.com
