= Mitnick =

Mitnick, Mitnik, Mytnik, or Mytnyk is a surname of Slavic-language origin, signifying a toll collector. Mytnik is the Polish, Belarusian (Belarusian: Мытнік), and Russian (Russian: Мытник) form. Its Ukrainian version is Mytnyk (Ukrainian: Митник). Notable people with the surname include:

- Kevin Mitnick (1963–2023), American computer security consultant, author and hacker
- Tadeusz Mytnik (born 1949), Polish cyclist
- Vadzim Mytnik (born 1988), Belarusian association football player

== See also ==
- Mytnik, Vashkinsky District, Vologda Oblast, a village in Russia
- Mytnik, Vozhegodsky District, Vologda Oblast, a village in Russia
