= 1977 UCI Road World Championships =

- Venue: San Cristóbal, Venezuela
- Date: 27 August 1977
- Coordinates: 7°46′N 72°14′W
- Events: 4

The 1977 UCI Road World Championships took place on 27 August 1977 in San Cristóbal, Venezuela. The championships were held in South America for the first time.

In the same period, the 1977 UCI Track Cycling World Championships were also organized in San Cristóbal.

== Results ==
Race:	Gold:	Time	Silver:	Time	Bronze :	Time
Men
Men's road race	Francesco Moser; Italy	6.36'24"	Dietrich Thurau; West Germany	m.t.	Franco Bitossi; Italy	+1'19"
Amateurs' road race	Claudio Corti; Italy	-	Sergueï Morozov; Soviet Union	-	Salvatore Maccali; Italy	-
Team time trial	Soviet Union; Valery Chaplygin; Aavo Pikkuus; Vladimir Kaminski; Anatoli Chukanov	–	Italy; Mirko Bernardi; Mauro De Pellegrin; Vito Da Ros; Dino Porrini	–	Poland; Tadeusz Mytnik; Mieczysław Nowicki; Stanisław Szozda; Czesław Lang	-
Women
Women's road race	Josiane Bost; France	-	Connie Carpenter; United States	-	Minnie Brinkhof; Netherlands	-

== Medal table ==
Rank	Nation	Gold	Silver	Bronze	Total
1	Italy (ITA)	2	1	2	5
2	Soviet Union (URS)	1	1	0	2
3	France (FRA)	1	0	0	1
4	United States (USA)	0	1	0	1
4	West Germany (FRG)	0	1	0	1
6	Netherlands (NED)	0	0	1	1
6	Poland (POL)	0	0	1	1
Totals (7 entries)		4	4	4	12
