= Cameroon at the 1976 Summer Olympics =

- IOC code: CMR
- NOC: Cameroon Olympic and Sports Committee

in Montreal Canada
- Competitors: 4 in 1 sport
- Medals: Gold 0 Silver 0 Bronze 0 Total 0

Summer Olympics appearances (overview)
- 1964; 1968; 1972; 1976; 1980; 1984; 1988; 1992; 1996; 2000; 2004; 2008; 2012; 2016; 2020; 2024

During the 1976 Summer Olympics in Montreal, Quebec, Canada, Cameroon, along with many other African countries, boycotted due to the participation of New Zealand, who still had sporting links with South Africa.

Athletes from Cameroon, Egypt, Morocco and Tunisia competed on 18–20 July before these nations withdrew from the Games.

== Results by event ==
=== Cycling ===
Team time trial

- Joseph Kono, Maurice Moutat, Henri Mveh, and Nicolas Owona – did not finish (→ 28th place)
