= 1975 UCI Road World Championships =

- Venue: Mettet and Yvoir, Belgium
- Date: 27-31 August 1975
- Coordinates: 50°20′N 04°53′E
- Events: Frefl

The 1975 UCI Road World Championships took place from 27 to 31 August 1975 in Mettet and Yvoir, Belgium.

In the same period, the 1975 UCI Track Cycling World Championships were organized in Rocourt.

== Results ==
| Race: | Gold: | Time | Silver: | Time | Bronze : | Time |
|---|---|---|---|---|---|---|
Men
| Men's road race | Hennie Kuiper; Netherlands | 6 h 39 min 19s | Roger De Vlaeminck; Belgium | + 17s | Jean-Pierre Danguillaume; France | m.t. |
| Amateurs' road race | André Gevers; Netherlands | - | Sven-Åke Nilsson; Sweden | - | Roberto Ceruti; Italy | - |
| Team time trial | Poland; Tadeusz Mytnik; Mieczysław Nowicki; Ryszard Szurkowski; Stanisław Szozda | – | Soviet Union; Gennady Komnatov; Valery Chaplygin; Aavo Pikkuus; Vladimir Kaminski | – | Czechoslovakia; Petr Matoušek; Vlastimil Moravec; Vladimír Vondráček; Petr Bucháček | - |
Women
| Women's road race | Tineke Fopma; Netherlands | - | Geneviève Gambillon; France | - | Keetie van Oosten-Hage; Netherlands | - |

== Medal table ==
| Rank | Nation | Gold | Silver | Bronze | Total |
|---|---|---|---|---|---|
| 1 | Netherlands (NED) | 3 | 0 | 1 | 4 |
| 2 | Poland (POL) | 1 | 0 | 0 | 1 |
| 3 | France (FRA) | 0 | 1 | 1 | 2 |
| 4 | Belgium (BEL) | 0 | 1 | 0 | 1 |
| 4 | Soviet Union (URS) | 0 | 1 | 0 | 1 |
| 4 | Sweden (SWE) | 0 | 1 | 0 | 1 |
| 7 | Czechoslovakia (TCH) | 0 | 0 | 1 | 1 |
| 7 | Italy (ITA) | 0 | 0 | 1 | 1 |
| Totals (8 entries) | | 4 | 4 | 4 | 12 |
