= Cycling at the 1976 Summer Olympics – Men's team time trial =

Men's cycling team time trial at the Games of the XXI Olympiad
- Venue: Montreal, Quebec, Canada; 100.00 km (62.1 mi)
- Date: 18 July 1976
- Competitors: from 29 nations
- Winning time: 2:08:53

Medalists
1st place, gold medalist(s)		Aavo Pikkuus, Valery Chaplygin, Anatoly Chukanov, Vladimir Kaminsky	Soviet Union
2nd place, silver medalist(s)		Ryszard Szurkowski, Tadeusz Mytnik, Mieczysław Nowicki, Stanisław Szozda	Poland
3rd place, bronze medalist(s)		Jørn Lund, Verner Blaudzun, Gert Frank, Jørgen Hansen	Denmark

The men's team time trial event was part of the road cycling programme at the 1976 Summer Olympics. The venue for this event was the Mont-Royal Park, Montreal, Quebec, Canada.

== Final standings ==
Rank	Cyclists	Team	Time
1st place, gold medalist(s)	Aavo Pikkuus; Valery Chaplygin; Anatoly Chukanov; Vladimir Kaminsky	Soviet Union	2:08:53
2nd place, silver medalist(s)	Ryszard Szurkowski; Tadeusz Mytnik; Mieczysław Nowicki; Stanisław Szozda	Poland	2:09:13
3rd place, bronze medalist(s)	Jørn Lund; Verner Blaudzun; Gert Frank; Jørgen Hansen	Denmark	2:12:20
4	Hans-Peter Jakst; Olaf Paltian; Friedrich von Löffelholz; Peter Weibel	West Germany	2:12:35
5	Petr Bucháček; Petr Matoušek; Milan Puzrla; Vladimír Vondráček	Czechoslovakia	2:12:56
6	Paul Carbutt; Philip Griffiths; Dudley Hayton; William Nickson	Great Britain	2:13:10
7	Tord Filipsson; Bernt Johansson; Sven-Åke Nilsson; Tommy Prim	Sweden	2:13:13
8	Stein Bråthen; Geir Digerud; Arne Klavenes; Magne Orre	Norway	2:13:17
9	Ian Chandler; Remo Sansonetti; Sal Sansonetti; Clyde Sefton	Australia	2:13:43
10	Hans-Joachim Hartnick; Karl-Dietrich Diers; Gerhard Lauke; Michael Schiffner	East Germany	2:14:39
11	Carmelo Barone; Vito Da Ros; Gino Lori; Dino Porrini	Italy	2:14:50
12	Stoyan Bobekov; Georgi Fortunov; Ivan Popov; Nedyalko Stoyanov	Bulgaria	2:15:07
13	Alfons De Wolf; Dirk Heirweg; Frank Hoste; Daniel Willems	Belgium	2:16:08
14	Carlos Cardet; Gregorio Aldo Arencibia; Jorge Gómez; Raúl Marcelo Vázquez	Cuba	2:17:00
15	Leo Karner; Roman Humenberger; Rudolf Mitteregger; Johann Summer	Austria	2:17:06
16	Marc Blouin; Brian Chewter; Tom Morris; Serge Proulx	Canada	2:17:15
17	Arie Hassink; Frits Pirard; Adri van Houwelingen; Fons van Katwijk	Netherlands	2:18:46
18	José Castañeda; Ceferino Estrada; Francisco Huerta; Rodolfo Vitela	Mexico	2:18:48
19	John Howard; Wayne Stetina; Marc Thompson; Alan Kingsbery	United States	2:18:53
20	Claude Buchon; Loic Gautier; Jean-Paul Maho; Jean-Michel Richeux	France	2:19:43
21	José Ollarves; Justo Galaviz; Jesús Escalona; Serafino Silva	Venezuela	2:23:37
22	Osvaldo Benvenuti; Oswaldo Frossasco; Juan Carlos Haedo; Raúl Labbate	Argentina	2:24:48
23	Cristóbal Pérez; Álvaro Pachón; Luis Manrique; Julio Rubiano	Colombia	2:24:55
24	Asghar Khodayari; Hassan Aryanfar; Khosro Haghgosha; Gholam Hossein Koohi	Iran	2:28:25
25	Panya Singprayool-Dinmuong; Chartchai Juntrat; Sucheep Likittay; Prajin Rungrote	Thailand	2:35:03
26	Chan Fai Lui; Chan Lam Hams; Kwong Chi Yan; Tang Kam Man	Hong Kong	2:39:43
27	Miguel Espinoza; David Iornos; Hamblin González; Manuel Largaespada	Nicaragua	2:51:23
28	Joseph Kono; Maurice Moutat; Henri Mveh; Nicolas Owona	Cameroon	DNF
