= Stelio Belletti =

Italian artisan and entrepreneur

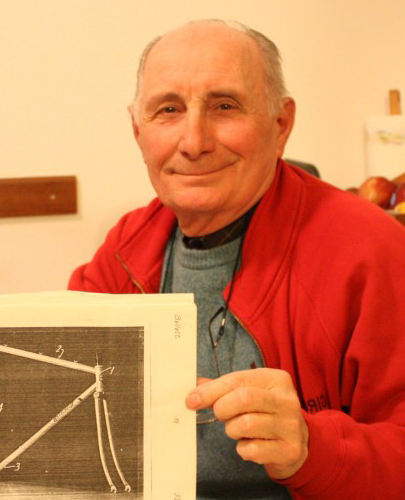
Stelio Belletti in 2011

Stelio Belletti (born November 19, 1932, in Mantua) is an Italian craftsman and entrepreneur and specialized in bicycle frame construction. He founded the brand Stelbel in 1973.

== Career ==
=== In aviation ===
At the end of World War II, at the age of 13, Stelio Belletti began working for his father Antenore Belletti in his workshop in via Giovanni Antonio Amadeo in the Ortica district of Milan, where they repaired and built tubular steel aircraft fuselages. They produced fuselages for some important aeronautical companies in Milan, working for the most part with the Società Italiana Ernesto Breda where his father, Antenore Belletti, apprenticed in the years before the war started. In the early years of working with his father, they receive important commissions from Fratelli Nardi and Caproni di Taliedo. In the 50s, they established a relationship with the newly founded Aviamilano owned by Mario Vietri, who commissions a variety of projects from Belletti. The projects were often contracted through the engineer Stelio Frati, who regularly commissioned projects from the Belletti workshop, the majority of which were prototypes. One of the most important projects was the development of a fuselage for the F.8L Falco, a lightweight aircraft designed by Frati. They also built all the fuselages for the P.19 Aircraft, also for Aviamilano and designed by the engineer Ermenegildo Preti. The Belletti Workshop, driven by the aviation industry, was one of the first in Italy to acquire TIG welding equipment from the American company Miller.

=== In the motorcycle industry ===
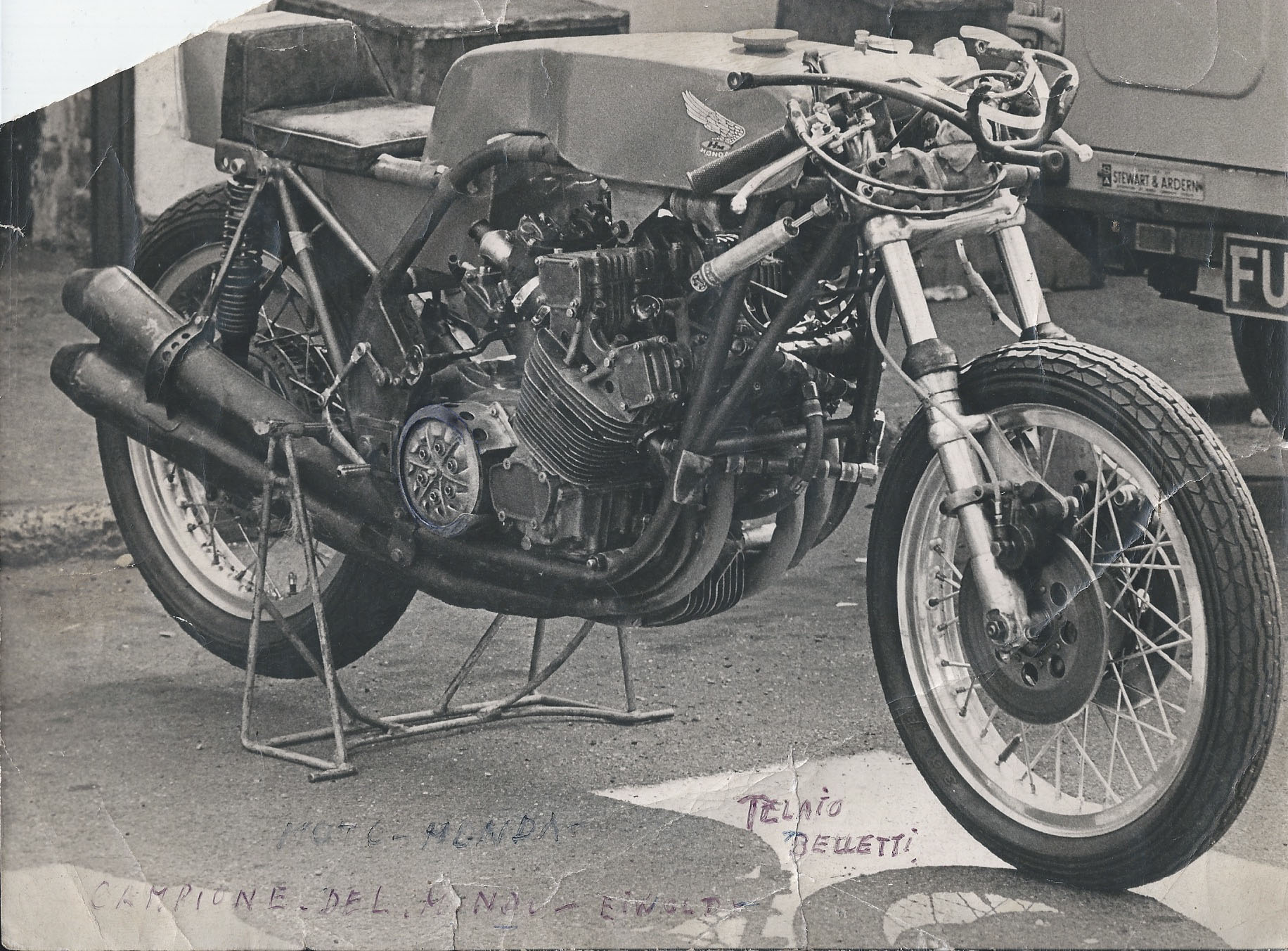
Mike Hailwood Honda GP500 with a Belletti frame

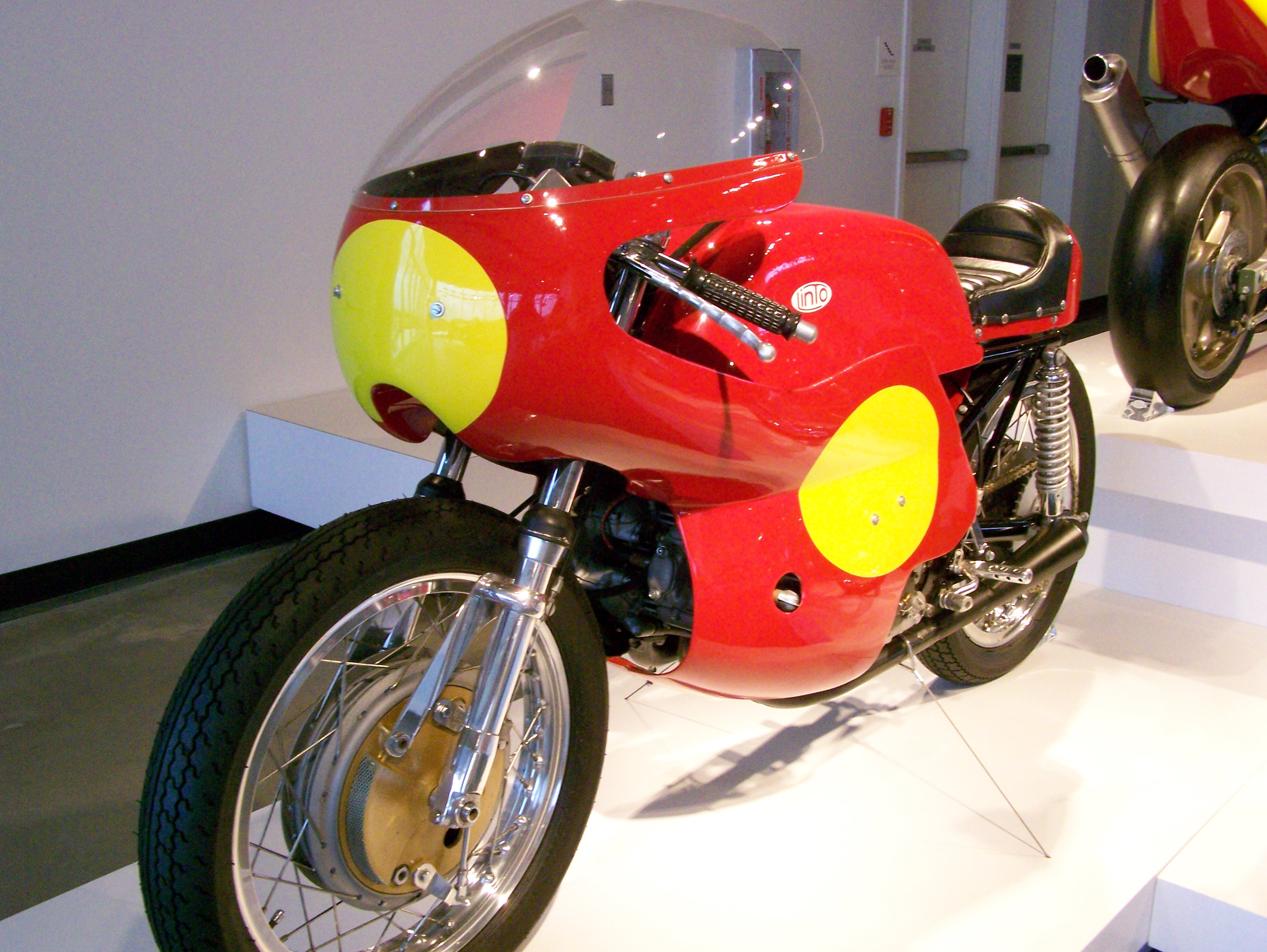
Linto 500GP 1969

Towards the end of the 50s, while continuing to work in the aviation industry, the Belletti Workshop began to establish important relationships in the motorcycle racing industry, working closely with Eng. Lino Tonti, building motorcycle frames for racing competitions. Some of the first frames were built for Paton in Milan, who they continued to work with until 1973. Paton motorcycles with Belletti frames, or replicas of the same, are identified with the initials BL, as can be seen in the BL3-R model which is still in production today. Starting in the 60s, other important brands such as Linto, Puch Frigerio, and Guazzoni begin to commission the Belletti family to build prototypes and special motorcycle frames for racing. One of the most significant achievements within the motorcycle industry dates back to 1967. That year, Mike Hailwood was to take part in the World Championship with a Honda 500 GP, but after the initial testing carried out that winter, the road racer began to complain about the performance of the frame. In 1967, the engineers at the Japanese company had been focused on developing the engine (which turned out to be among the most powerful in the Championship) and consequently decided not to make any further changes to the chassis. Referred by specialist Giuseppe Pattoni, Hailwood approached Stelio and Antenore Belletti as a private customer and commissioned them to construct a new chassis for his Honda 500 GP. They completed the tubular-steel double cradle frame in just 16 days. The Honda 500 GP motorcycle equipped with the new Belletti frame was used for the first time at the Mototemporada Romagnola, in the Rimini stage on May 14, 1967. The road racer won the race, breaking the winning streak of racer Giacomo Agostini who rode a MV Agusta. The motorcycle was also used in the World Championship while testing the Hockenheim circuit, but Honda forbade the use of the motorcycle during the race and for all subsequent races. In 1968, they also began construction on a limited series of frames to equip the Gran Prix motorcycle Linto 500 GP; all the frames for this model were designed by Belletti’s friend, Lino Tonti, and built by Belletti. The Belletti workshop continued to work in the motorcycle industry until the early 70s.

=== In the bicycle industry ===
Stelio Belletti has been passionate about racing bicycles ever since he was a boy. Starting in the 70s, he began to race in local and amateur competitions with excellent results. Spurred by a dry-spell in his family’s workshop and the dissatisfaction he felt towards the most recent racing bicycle he had purchased, Stelio Belletti tried his hand at bicycle frame building. His results encouraged him to found the Stelbel brand in 1973. Having honed his TIG welding skills while working in the aviation industry, he became the first Italian frame builder to build TIG welded frames. In 1975, Stelio Belletti patented the first bicycle frame welded with TIG welding techniques in Italy and that same year produced the frames for the Polish national team, who went on to win the gold medal in the men’s team time trial race at the UCI Road World Championships in Mettet. By the second half of the 70s, the Belletti workshop concentrated on the production of Stelbel bicycle frames, and gradually began to decrease their commitment in other areas of production. In the early 80s, for age reasons, his father Antenore left the company to Stelio, and under his management the company hired additional employees.

Stelio Belletti is recognized to have been on the forefront of bicycle frame construction, always pushing the boundaries and experimenting with new solutions. He remembers being one of the first manufacturers to make stainless steel frames. Belletti continued to work in his family’s workshop until 1990 when the company closed. Over the following years, Belletti collaborated with other Italian brands producing TIG welded frames made with steel or aluminum tubing. Upon his retirement, Stelio Belletti has devoted his time to sports, participating in several cycling events, and even organizing some himself.

== See also ==
- Stelbel
- Antenore Belletti
