= Gino Lori =

Italian cyclist

Personal information
- Full name: Gino Lori
- Born: 3 January 1956 (age 70) Parma, Italy

Cycling career
- Sport: Cycling
- Discipline: Road

Amateur teams
- 1975: G.S. Pacam
- 1976: G.S. Termolan - Bibbiano

Professional team
- 1977–1978: Scic

Major wins
- Milano-Bologna (1975); Milano-Rapallo (1976); Giro delle due Province-Marciana di Cascina (1976); Coppa Mobilio Ponsacco (1976)

Gino Lori (born 3 January 1956) is an Italian former cyclist. He competed in the team time trial event at the 1976 Summer Olympics.

== Career ==
Born in 1956 in Parma, during his final two years as an amateur (1975 and 1976) he won the Milano-Bologna in his first year with G.S. Pacam, and the Coppa Mobilio Ponsacco, Milano-Rapallo and Giro delle due Province-Marciana di Cascina in his second year with G.S. Termolan - Bibbiano.

At the age of 20, he competed in the 1976 Summer Olympics in cycling, finishing 11th in the team time trial alongside Carmelo Barone, Vito Da Ros and Dino Porrini, with a time of 2h 14' 50".

In 1977, at the age of 21, he turned professional with Scic, remaining with the team until the end of his career in 1978, at the age of 22.

== Achievements ==
- 1975 (amateurs)
  - Milano-Bologna
- 1976 (amateurs)
  - Milano-Rapallo
  - Giro delle due Province-Marciana di Cascina
  - Coppa Mobilio Ponsacco

== Results ==
=== World competitions ===
- Olympic Games
  - Montréal 1976 – Team time trial: 11th
