= Guazzo =

Guazzo is a surname. Notable people with the surname include:

- Francesco Maria Guazzo (c. 1570 – c. 1630), teacher of theology and author of the witch-finders’ manual Compendium Maleficarum
- Marco Guazzo (died 1566), Italian writer from Padua
- Stefano Guazzo (1530–1593), Italian writer from Casale Monferrato

== See also ==
- Guazzo, the Italian term for gouache
- Guazzoni
