= 1973 UCI Road World Championships =

- Venue: Montjuich, Barcelona, Spain
- Date: 2 September 1973
- Coordinates: 41°23′N 2°11′E

The 1973 UCI Road World Championships took place on 2 September 1973 in Montjuïc, Barcelona, Spain, with four events contested. Italian Felice Gimondi and Belgian Nicole Vandenbroeck took the individual open championships, while Poland's Ryszard Szurkowski won the men's amateur road race and helped win the men's team time trial.

In the same period, the 1973 UCI Track Cycling World Championships were organized in San Sebastián.

== Results ==
Race:	Gold:	Time	Silver:	Time	Bronze :	Time
Men
Men's road race	Felice Gimondi; Italy	6 h 31 min 26s	Freddy Maertens; Belgium	m.t.	Luis Ocaña; Spain	m.t.
Amateurs' road race	Ryszard Szurkowski; Poland	-	Stanisław Szozda; Poland	-	Bernard Bourreau; France	-
Team time trial	Poland; Lucjan Lis; Ryszard Szurkowski; Stanisław Szozda; Tadeusz Mytnik	–	Soviet Union; Gennady Komnatov; Youri Mikhailov; Boris Shoukov; Sergey Sinizin	–	Sweden; Tord Filipsson; Lennart Fagerlund; Leif Hansson; Sven-Åke Nilsson	-
Women
Women's road race	Nicole Vandenbroeck; Belgium	-	Keetie van Oosten-Hage; Netherlands	-	Valentina Rebrovskaja; Soviet Union	-

== Medal table ==
Rank	Nation	Gold	Silver	Bronze	Total
1	Poland	2	1	0	3
2	Belgium	1	1	0	2
3	Italy	1	0	0	1
4	Soviet Union	0	1	1	2
5	Netherlands	0	1	0	1
6	France	0	0	1	1
6	Spain	0	0	1	1
6	Sweden	0	0	1	1
Totals (8 entries)		4	4	4	12
