= Chukanov =

Chukanov (masculine, Russian: Чуканов) or Chukanova (feminine, Russian: Чуканова) is a Russian surname. Notable people with the surname include:

- Anatoly Chukanov (1954–2021), Soviet cyclist
- Andrea Chukanov (born 1995), Russian football player
- Vyacheslav Chukanov (born 1952), Soviet equestrian
