= 1978 UCI Road World Championships =

- Venue: Nürburg, Germany (West Germany)
- Date: 27 August 1978
- Coordinates: 50°20′32″N 6°57′8″E

The 1978 UCI Road World Championships took place on 27 August 1978 in Nürburg, West Germany.

In the same period, the 1978 UCI Track Cycling World Championships were organized in Munich.

== Results ==
| Race: | Gold: | Time | Silver: | Time | Bronze : | Time |
|---|---|---|---|---|---|---|
Men
| Men's road race | Gerrie Knetemann; Netherlands | 7.32'04" | Francesco Moser; Italy | - | Jørgen Marcussen; Denmark | - |
| Amateurs' road race | Gilbert Glaus; Switzerland | - | Krzysztof Sujka; Poland | - | Stefan Mutter; Switzerland | - |
| Team time trial | Netherlands; Guus Bierings; Bert Oosterbosch; Bart van Est; Jan van Houwelingen | – | Soviet Union; Aavo Pikkuus; Vladimir Kaminski; Algimantas Guzevičius; Vladimir Kouznetsov | – | Switzerland; Gilbert Glaus; Stefan Mutter; Richard Trinkler; Kurt Ehrensperger | - |
Women
| Women's road race | Beate Habetz; West Germany | - | Keetie van Oosten-Hage; Netherlands | - | Emanuela Lorenzon; Italy | - |

== Medal table ==
| Rank | Nation | Gold | Silver | Bronze | Total |
|---|---|---|---|---|---|
| 1 | Netherlands (NED) | 2 | 1 | 0 | 3 |
| 2 | Switzerland (SUI) | 1 | 0 | 2 | 3 |
| 3 | West Germany (FRG) | 1 | 0 | 0 | 1 |
| 4 | Italy (ITA) | 0 | 1 | 1 | 2 |
| 5 | Poland (POL) | 0 | 1 | 0 | 1 |
| 5 | Soviet Union (URS) | 0 | 1 | 0 | 1 |
| 7 | Denmark (DEN) | 0 | 0 | 1 | 1 |
| Totals (7 entries) | | 4 | 4 | 4 | 12 |
