= 1974 UCI Road World Championships =

- Venue: Montreal, Quebec, Canada
- Date: 25 August 1974
- Coordinates: 45°30′32″N 73°33′42″W
- Events: 4

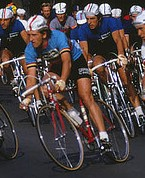
Freddy Maertens, 1974 World Championship Road Race, Montreal, Quebec, Canada

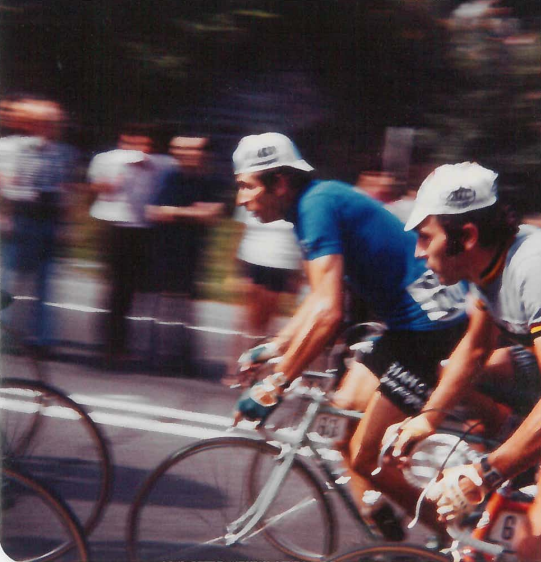
Felice Gimondi and Eddy Merckx in action on the climb of Voie Camillien Houde.

The 1974 UCI Road World Championships took place on 25 August 1974 in Montreal, Quebec, Canada.

The Grand Prix Cycliste de Montréal and the 1976 Summer Olympics follows a similar course to this World Championship. It was the 47th edition of the tournament and the first to be hosted outside Europe.

In the same period, the 1974 UCI Track Cycling World Championships were also organized in Montréal.

== Results ==
Race:	Gold:	Time	Silver:	Time	Bronze :	Time
Men
Men's road race	Eddy Merckx; Belgium	6 h 52 min 22s	Raymond Poulidor; France	+ 2s	Mariano Martínez; France	+ 37s
Amateurs' road race	Janusz Kowalski; Poland	-	Ryszard Szurkowski; Poland	-	Michel Kuhn; Switzerland	-
Team time trial	Sweden; Lennart Fagerlund; Bernt Johansson; Tord Filipsson; Sven-Åke Nilsson	-	Soviet Union; Gennady Komnatov; Rinat Sharafullin; Vladimir Kaminski; Valery Chaplygin	-	East Germany; Hans-Joachim Hartnick; Karl Dietrich Diers; Horst Tischoff; Gerhard Lauke	-
Women
Women's road race	Geneviève Gambillon; France	-	Baiba Caune; Soviet Union	-	Keetie van Oosten-Hage; Netherlands	-

== Medal table ==
Rank	Nation	Gold	Silver	Bronze	Total
1	France (FRA)	1	1	1	3
2	Poland (POL)	1	1	0	2
3	Belgium (BEL)	1	0	0	1
3	Sweden (SWE)	1	0	0	1
5	Soviet Union (URS)	0	2	0	2
6	East Germany (DDR)	0	0	1	1
6	Netherlands (NED)	0	0	1	1
6	Switzerland (SUI)	0	0	1	1
Totals (8 entries)		4	4	4	12
