= Jorge Gómez (cyclist) =

Cuban cyclist

Personal information
- Born: 3 May 1956 (age 70)

Cycling career
- Sport: Cycling

Jorge Gómez (born 3 May 1956) is a Cuban former cyclist. He competed in the team time trial event at the 1976 Summer Olympics.
