= Jesús Escalona =

Venezuelan cyclist

Personal information
- Born: 15 August 1953 (age 73)

Cycling career
- Sport: Cycling

Jesús Escalona (born 15 August 1953) is a Venezuelan former cyclist. He competed in the team time trial event at the 1976 Summer Olympics.
