= Serafino Silva =

Venezuelan cyclist

Personal information
- Born: 30 October 1953 (age 72)

Cycling career
- Sport: Cycling

Serafino Silva (born 30 October 1953) is a Venezuelan former cyclist. He competed in the team time trial event at the 1976 Summer Olympics.
