= Ceferino Estrada =

Mexican cyclist (1945–2003)

Personal information
- Born: 26 August 1945 Comonfort, Mexico
- Died: 24 November 2003 (aged 58)

Cycling career
- Sport: Cycling

Ceferino Estrada (26 August 1945 – 24 November 2003) was a Mexican cyclist. He competed in the team time trial event at the 1976 Summer Olympics.
