= Marc Thompson (cyclist) =

American cyclist

Personal information
- Born: June 27, 1953 (age 73) Kansas City, Missouri, United States

Cycling career
- Sport: Cycling

Marc Thompson (born June 27, 1953) is an American former cyclist. He competed in the team time trial event at the 1976 Summer Olympics. Marc won the 1974 edition of the Tour of Kansas City.
