= André Gevers =

Dutch cyclist (born 1952)

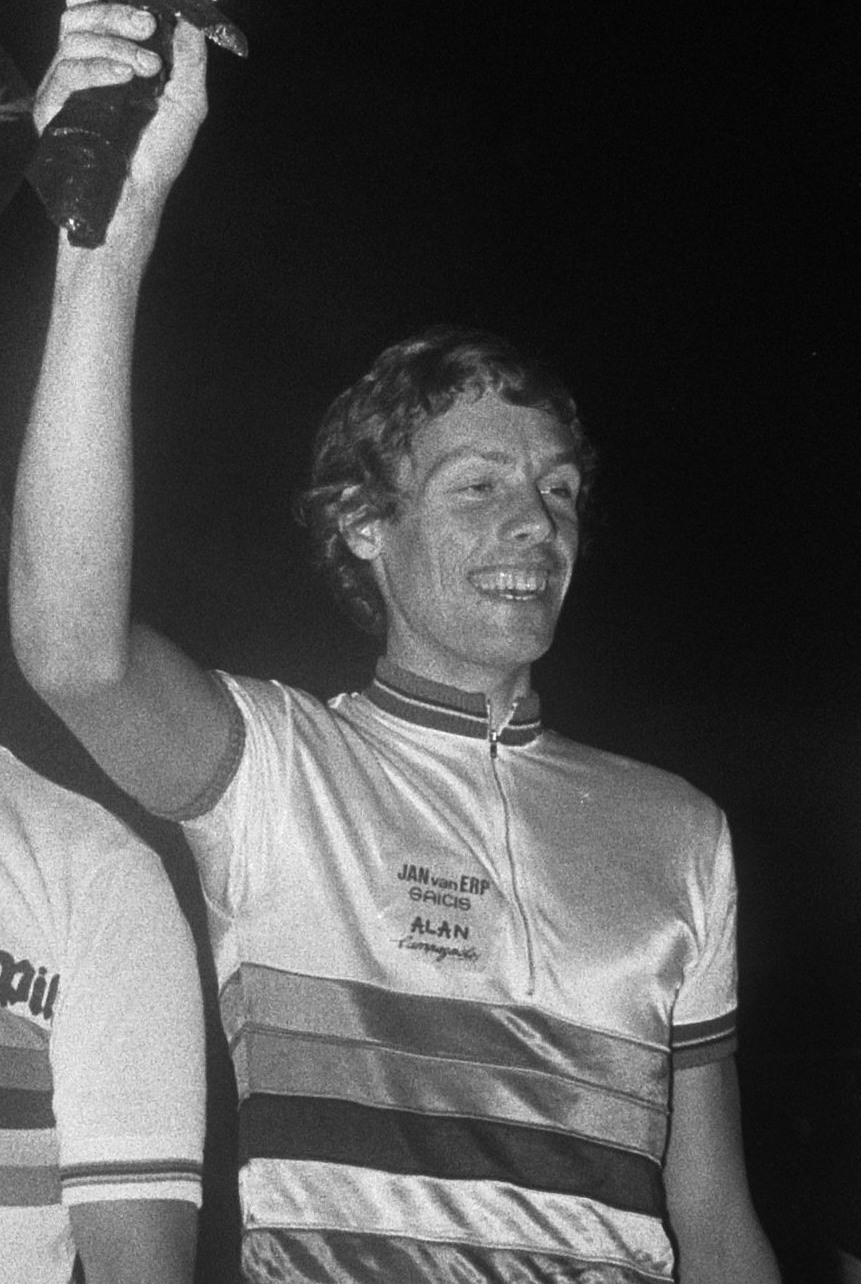
- André Gevers in 1975

Personal information
- Born: 19 August 1952 (age 74) Schijndel, the Netherlands

Sport
- Sport: Cycling
Medal record
Representing the Netherlands
UCI Road World Championships
Gold medal – first place	1975 Mettet	Road race

André Gevers (born 19 August 1952) is a retired amateur Dutch track cyclist who was active between 1973 and 1982. He won the amateur road race at the 1975 UCI Road World Championships, as well as individual stages of the Olympia's Tour (1975), Circuit de la Sarthe (1976 and 1977) and Ronde van Nederland (1976).

In 1978 and 1979 he rode as a professional for TI–Raleigh–McGregor.
