= Bert Oosterbosch =

Dutch cyclist (1957–1989)

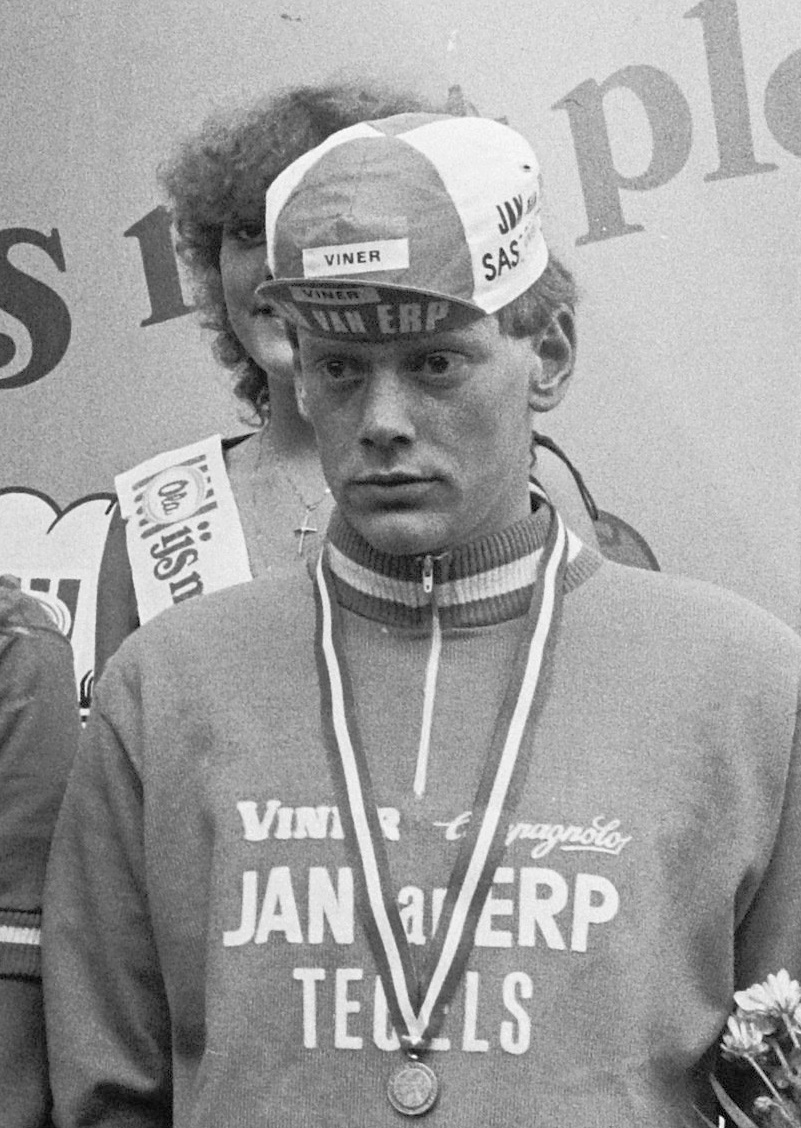

Personal information
- Full name: Bert Oosterbosch
- Born: 30 July 1957 Eindhoven, Netherlands
- Died: 18 August 1989 (aged 32) Lekkerkerk, Netherlands

Cycling career
- Sport: Cycling
- Disciplines: Road and track
- Role: Rider
- Rider type: Time triallist

Professional teams
- 1979–1981: TI–Raleigh
- 1982: DAF Trucks
- 1983: TI–Raleigh
- 1984–1986: Panasonic
- 1987: Panasonic-Isostar
- 1988: TVM-Van Schilt

Major wins
- World Champion professional individual pursuit 6 Tour de France stages Ronde van Nederland
Medal record
Representing the Netherlands
Men's cycling
World Championships
Gold medal – first place	1978 Köln	Team time trial
Gold medal – first place	1979 Amsterdam	Professional pursuit
Bronze medal – third place	1981 Brno	Professional pursuit

Bert Oosterbosch (30 July 1957 – 18 August 1989) was a Dutch racing cyclist. Oosterbosch was a successful track and road racer.

== Early career ==
In 1978, he won the World amateur team time trial championship (with Jan van Houwelingen, Bart van Est and Guus Bierings). A year later, he turned professional for the TI–Raleighteam of Peter Post. That year he won the World Professional individual pursuit title beating Francesco Moser in the final. He was also three times Dutch pursuit champion.

== Road success ==
As a professional Oosterbosch was especially successful in time trials; he won 14 stage race prologues, including three in the Tour de France. He won three other stages of the Tour: his victory in Bordeaux in 1983 was the one hundredth Dutch stage win in the Tour.

Oosterbosch also won stages in the Vuelta a España and the Tour de Suisse. In 1982 he won the Ronde van Nederland.

== Poor health ==
Oosterbosch suffered poor health on occasions, twice contracting meningitis. In 1988 he was hit by severe knee trouble and had to end his professional career. He returned as an amateur and on 13 August 1989 he won a race. Five days later he died, aged thirty-two years old, after an acute cardiac arrest. He was buried at the Roman Catholic Cemetery Our Lady of Lourdes in Eindhoven. His tombstone depicts cycle racing.

Bert Oosterbosch was married to Marian Bik. The couple had two daughters: Nathalie and Joyce.

== Allegations of doping ==
It has been suggested that Oosterbosch's early death was caused by EPO use, but this is disputed.

Willy Voet, the disgraced former soigneur, talks about Oosterbosch riding the 1982 Grand Prix des Nations. Oosterbosch came in 18th at more than two and a half minutes behind the winner Bernard Hinault, even though he was expected to do well. Voet said "Oosterbosch was flat from the start due to the Synacthen he had taken. The drugs initially blocked his ability to work hard. An hour after the injection it started working as planned and his tempo increased." In fact, Oosterbosch came third in the 1982 event. Voet may be referring to the 1979 or 1984 runnings which Hinault also won.

== Major results ==
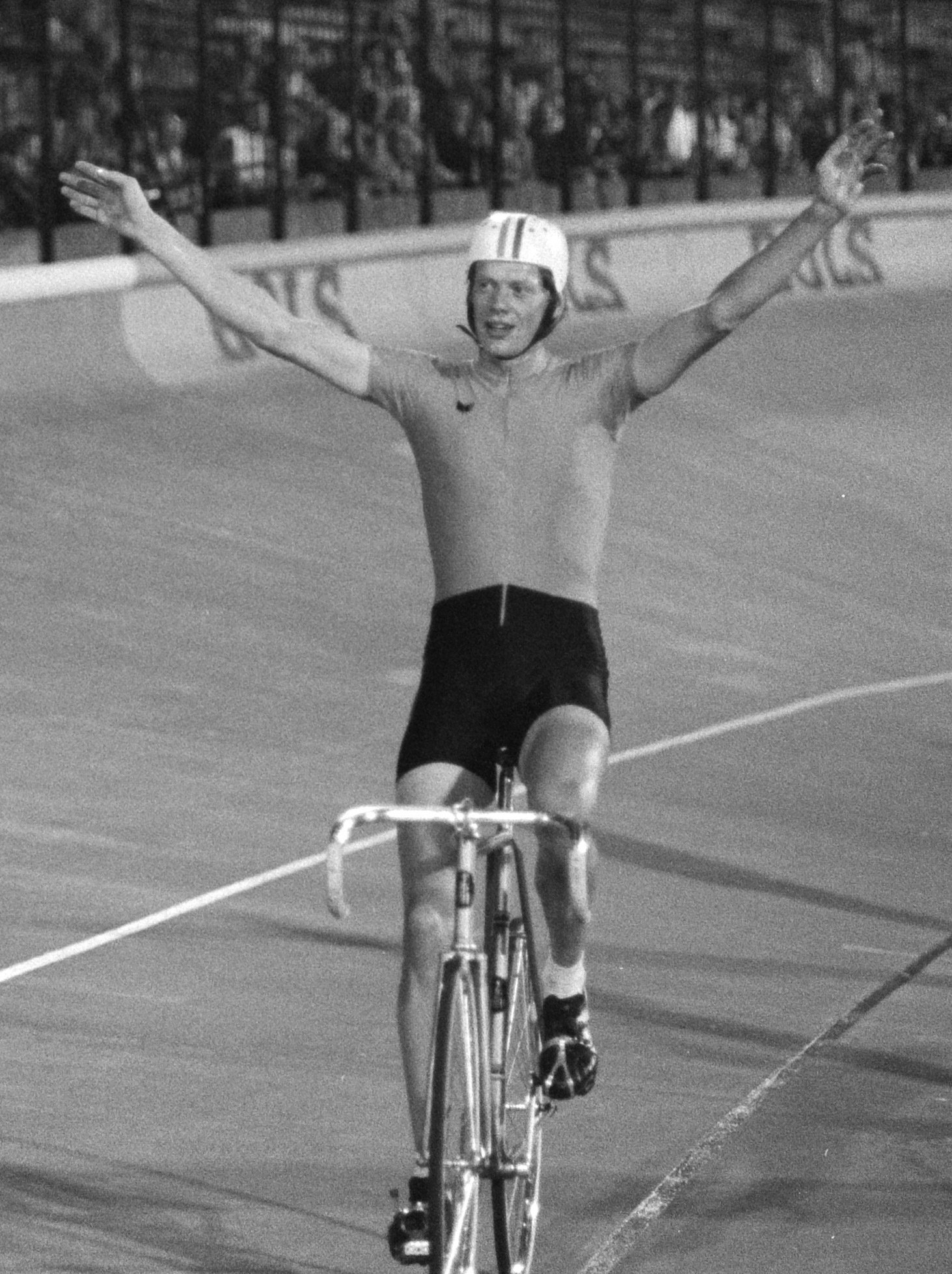
Bert Oosterbosch in 1979

1979
World Professional pursuit champion
1980
Tour of Luxembourg
1 stage, Tour de France
1981
Four Days of Dunkirk
1982
Ronde van Nederland
1 stage, Tour de Suisse
1983
Tour of the Americas
Étoile de Bessèges
2 stages, Tour de France
1984
E3 Prijs Vlaanderen
Driedaagse van De Panne
1 stage, Tour de Suisse
1985
1 stage, Vuelta a España

== See also ==
- List of doping cases in cycling
