= Friedrich von Löffelholz =

German cyclist (1955–2017)

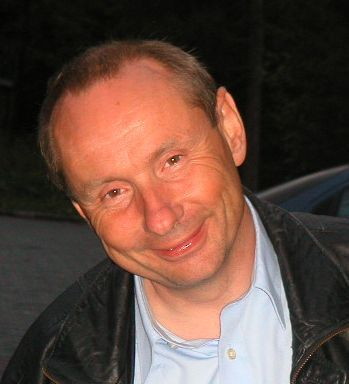
- Friedrich von Löffelholz in 2005

Personal information
- Born: 7 March 1955 Nuremberg, West Germany
- Died: 2 October 2017 (aged 62)

Cycling career
- Sport: Cycling

Friedrich von Löffelholz (7 March 1955 – 2 October 2017) was a German cyclist. He competed in the team time trial event at the 1976 Summer Olympics.
