= Sucheep Likitrak =

Thai cyclist

Sucheep Likittay
Personal information
- Born: 1 April 1952
- Died: 28 April 2010 (aged 58)

Cycling career
- Sport: Cycling

Sucheep Likitrak (Thai: สุชีพ ลิขิตลักษณ์, previously Sucheep Likittay; 1 April 1952 – 28 April 2010) was a Thai local politician and cyclist. He competed in the team time trial event at the 1976 Summer Olympics. Later, he became a long-time village headman in Nakhon Si Thammarat province, but was assassinated in a drive-by shooting in 2010.
