= Marc Blouin =

Canadian cyclist

Personal information
- Born: 13 May 1953 (age 73) Quebec City, Quebec, Canada

Cycling career
- Sport: Cycling

Marc Blouin (born 13 May 1953) is a Canadian former cyclist. He competed in the team time trial event at the 1976 Summer Olympics.
