= Alan Kingsbery =

American cyclist

Personal information
- Born: July 23, 1954 (age 72) Lima, Ohio, United States

Cycling career
- Sport: Cycling

Alan Kingsbery (born July 23, 1954) is an American former cyclist. He competed in the team time trial event at the 1976 Summer Olympics.
