= Jean-Paul Maho =

French cyclist

Personal information
- Born: 20 February 1945 (age 81) Lorient, France

Cycling career
- Sport: Cycling

Jean-Paul Maho (born 20 February 1945) is a French former cyclist. He competed in the team time trial event at the 1976 Summer Olympics.
