= Claude Buchon =

French cyclist (1949–2024)

Personal information
- Born: 9 February 1949 Saint-Brieuc, France
- Died: 23 June 2024 (aged 75)

Cycling career
- Sport: Cycling
- Discipline: Road
- Role: Rider

Claude Buchon (9 February 1949 – 23 June 2024) was a French cyclist. He competed in the team time trial event at the 1976 Summer Olympics. Buchon died on 23 June 2024, at the age of 75.
