= Loic Gautier =

French cyclist

Personal information
- Born: 8 September 1954 (age 72) Le Hinglé, France

Cycling career
- Sport: Cycling

Loic Gautier (born 8 September 1954) is a French former cyclist. He competed in the team time trial event at the 1976 Summer Olympics.
