= Georgi Fortunov =

Bulgarian cyclist

Personal information
- Born: 9 September 1957 (age 69)

Cycling career
- Sport: Cycling

Georgi Fortunov (Bulgarian: Георги Фортунов, born 9 September 1957) is a Bulgarian former cyclist. He competed in the team time trial event at the 1976 Summer Olympics.
