= Kapera =

Village in Estonia

- Location within Estonia
- Coordinates: 57°45′56″N 27°19′23″E
- Country: Estonia
- County: Võru County
- Time zone: UTC+2 (EET)

Kapera is a settlement in Võru Parish, Võru County in southeastern Estonia. A kolkhoz operated in Kapera in the 1950s.

== Notable people ==
Notable people that were born or lived in Kapera include the following:

- Aavo Pikkuus (born 1954), cyclist
