= Ian Chandler (cyclist) =

Australian cyclist

Personal information
- Born: 3 August 1952 (age 74) Melbourne, Australia

Cycling career
- Sport: Cycling

Ian Chandler (born 3 August 1952) is an Australian former cyclist. He competed in the team time trial event at the 1976 Summer Olympics.
