= Aavo Pikkuus =

Estonian cyclist

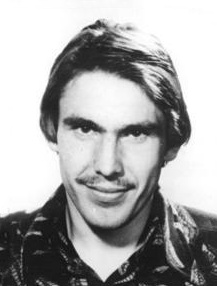
- Pikkuus in 1977

Personal information
- Born: 23 November 1954 (age 71) Kapera, then part of Estonian SSR, Soviet Union
- Height: 1.78 m (5 ft 10 in)
- Weight: 76 kg (168 lb)

Cycling career
- Sport: Cycling
Medal record
Men's road bicycle racing
Representing the Soviet Union
Olympic Games
Gold medal – first place	1976 Montreal	Team time trial
World Championships
Silver medal – second place	1975 Mettet and Yvoir	Team time trial
Gold medal – first place	1977 San Cristóbal	Team time trial
Silver medal – second place	1978 Nürburg	Team time trial

Aavo Pikkuus (born 23 November 1954) is a retired Estonian cyclist. He was part of the Soviet Union cycling team that won the 100 km team time trial at the 1976 Summer Olympics and 1977 UCI Road World Championships and finished second at the world championships in 1975 and 1978.

Between 1974 and 1977 Pikkuus won four national (Soviet) titles in the road race. In 1975 he finished third at the multistage Peace Race. He won that race in 1977 individually and in 1975 and 1977–1979 in the team competition; in 1977 he was leading the race from start to finish. He won the Circuit de la Sarthe in 1977 and Giro delle Regione in 1978.

He retired from cycling in 1981 and for several years successfully competed in auto rally. (For example, he won the 1983 Saaremaa Rally.) Later he owned a car shop, which burned down in the 1990s.

Pikkuus is an honorary member of the Estonian Olympic Committee and was named Estonian Sportspersonality of the year five times (1974–1978). In 2001 he was awarded the Order of the Estonian Red Cross. He is married and has three daughters and a son.

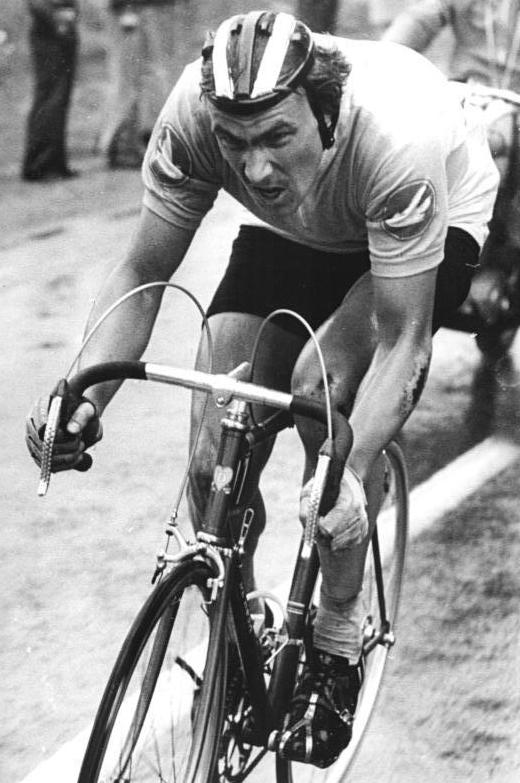
Pikkuus in 1977
