= Vladimir Kaminsky =

Soviet cyclist (born 1950)

Personal information
- Born: 18 April 1950 (age 76) Minsk, Byelorussian SSR, Soviet Union
- Height: 1.88 m (6 ft 2 in)
- Weight: 87 kg (192 lb)

Sport
- Sport: Cycling
- Club: Spartak Minsk
Medal record
Representing the Soviet Union
Olympic Games
Gold medal – first place	1976 Montreal	Team time trial
World championships
Gold medal – first place	1977 San Cristóbal	Team time trial
Silver medal – second place	1974 Montreal	Team time trial
Silver medal – second place	1975 Mettet and Yvoir	Team time trial
Silver medal – second place	1978 Nürburg	Team time trial

Vladimir Vladimirovich Kaminsky (Belarusian: Уладзімір Уладзіміравіч Камінскі; born 18 April 1950) is a retired Soviet cyclist, Belarusian coach. He was part of the Soviet team that won the 100 km team time trial at the 1976 Summer Olympics and 1977 UCI Road World Championships and finished second at the world championships in 1974, 1975 and 1978.

He won a national title before the 1980 Olympics, but was not selected because of age. After retirement he defended a PhD in cycling and worked with the Soviet national team. He later taught at the Belarusian State University of Physical Training and worked as a cycling coach. Between 1996 and 1999 he headed the national team of Belarus.

His two elder brothers, Leonid and Anatoly, are also retired cyclists.
