= Gennady Komnatov =

Russian cyclist (1949–1979)

Personal information
- Born: 18 September 1949 Zhelannoye, Omsk, Russian SFSR, Soviet Union
- Died: 1 April 1979 (aged 29) Omsk, Russian SFSR, Soviet Union
- Height: 1.73 m (5 ft 8 in)
- Weight: 73 kg (161 lb)

Sport
- Sport: Cycling
- Club: Burevestnik Omsk
Medal record
Representing the Soviet Union
Olympic Games
Gold medal – first place	1972 Munich	Team time trial
World championships
Silver medal – second place	1973 Barcelona	Team time trial
Silver medal – second place	1974 Montreal	Team time trial
Silver medal – second place	1975 Mettet and Yvoir	Team time trial

Gennady Viktorovich Komnatov (Russian: Геннадий Викторович Комнатов; 18 September 1949 – 1 April 1979) was a Russian road cyclist. He was part of the Soviet team that won a gold medal in the 100 km team time trial at the 1972 Summer Olympics. He won three silver medals at the world championships in 1973–1975 in this event.

Komnatov was the eldest sibling in a family of four brothers and one sister. Influenced by Gennady, two of his younger brothers, Vasily and Stanislav, became cycling coaches. Komnatov died aged 29 in a traffic accident. A monument in his honor stands in the village of Zhelannoye where he was born.
