= Mytnik, Vozhegodsky District, Vologda Oblast =

Mytnik Мытник
- Village
- Location within Vologda Oblast Location within Russia
- Coordinates: 60°19′N 39°10′E
- Country: Russia
- Region: Vologda Oblast
- District: Vozhegodsky District
- Time zone: UTC+3:00

Mytnik (Russian: Мытник) is a rural locality (a village) in Beketovskoye Rural Settlement, Vozhegodsky District, Vologda Oblast, Russia. The population was 32 as of 2002.

== Geography ==
Mytnik is located 79 km southwest of Vozhega (the district's administrative centre) by road. Tigino is the nearest rural locality.
