= Mytnik, Vashkinsky District, Vologda Oblast =

Mytnik Мытник
- Village
- Location within Vologda Oblast Location within Russia
- Coordinates: 60°28′N 37°55′E
- Country: Russia
- Region: Vologda Oblast
- District: Vashkinsky District
- Time zone: UTC+3:00

Mytnik (Russian: Мытник) is a rural locality (a village) in Andreyevskoye Rural Settlement, Vashkinsky District, Vologda Oblast, Russia. The population was 5 as of 2002.

== Geography ==
Mytnik is located 26 km north of Lipin Bor (the district's administrative centre) by road. Davydovo is the nearest rural locality.
