= Valery Chaplygin =

Soviet cyclist (born 1952)

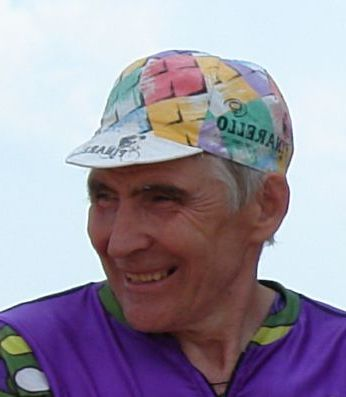
- Chaplygin in 2009

Personal information
- Born: 23 May 1952 (age 74) Kursk, Russian SFSR, Soviet Union
- Height: 1.86 m (6 ft 1 in)
- Weight: 80 kg (176 lb)

Sport
- Sport: Cycling
- Club: Spartak Kursk
Medal record
Representing the Soviet Union
Olympic Games
Gold medal – first place	1976 Montreal	Team time trial
World championships
Gold medal – first place	1977 San Cristóbal	Team time trial
Silver medal – second place	1974 Montreal	Team time trial
Silver medal – second place	1975 Mettet and Yvoir	Team time trial

Valery Andreyevich Chaplygin (Russian: Валерий Андреевич Чаплыгин; born 23 May 1952) is a Soviet cyclist. He was part of the Soviet team that won the 100 km team time trial at the 1976 Summer Olympics and 1977 UCI Road World Championships and finished second at the world championships in 1974 and 1975. He also won three Peace Races in the team competition (1975, 1977 and 1980).

Individually, he finished in 39th place in the road race at the 1976 Olympics, and won several international races during his career.

After retirement in 1982 he worked as a cycling coach, and between 1982 and 1985 trained the national team. He then worked at sports club Dynamo, and between 1999 and 2001 was responsible for sports in the administration of Kursk Oblast. Starting from 2005 he competed in cycling in the masters category and taught at the Kursk Technical University. He was awarded the Order of the Badge of Honour (1976).

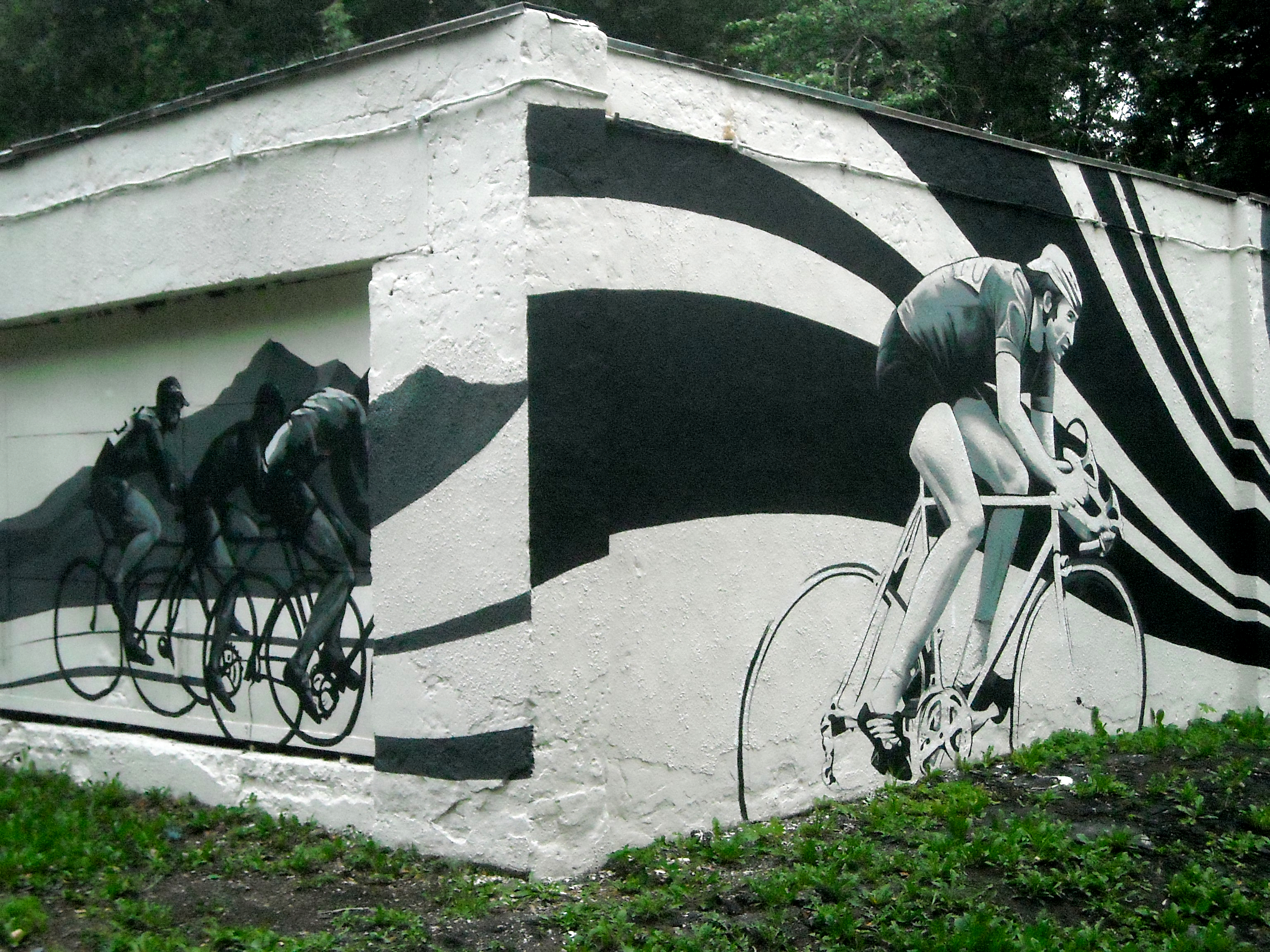
Graffiti of Valery Chaplygin in Kursk, Russia
