= Henri Mveh =

Cameroonian cyclist

Personal information
- Born: 18 March 1951 (age 75)

Cycling career
- Sport: Cycling

Henri Mveh (born 18 March 1951) is a Cameroonian cyclist. He competed in the team time trial event at the 1976 Summer Olympics.
