= Maurice Moutat =

Cameroonian cyclist

Personal information
- Born: 19 December 1954 (age 71)

Cycling career
- Sport: Cycling

Maurice Moutat (born 19 December 1954) is a Cameroonian former cyclist. He competed in the team time trial event at the 1976 Summer Olympics.
