= Bart van Est =

Dutch cyclist

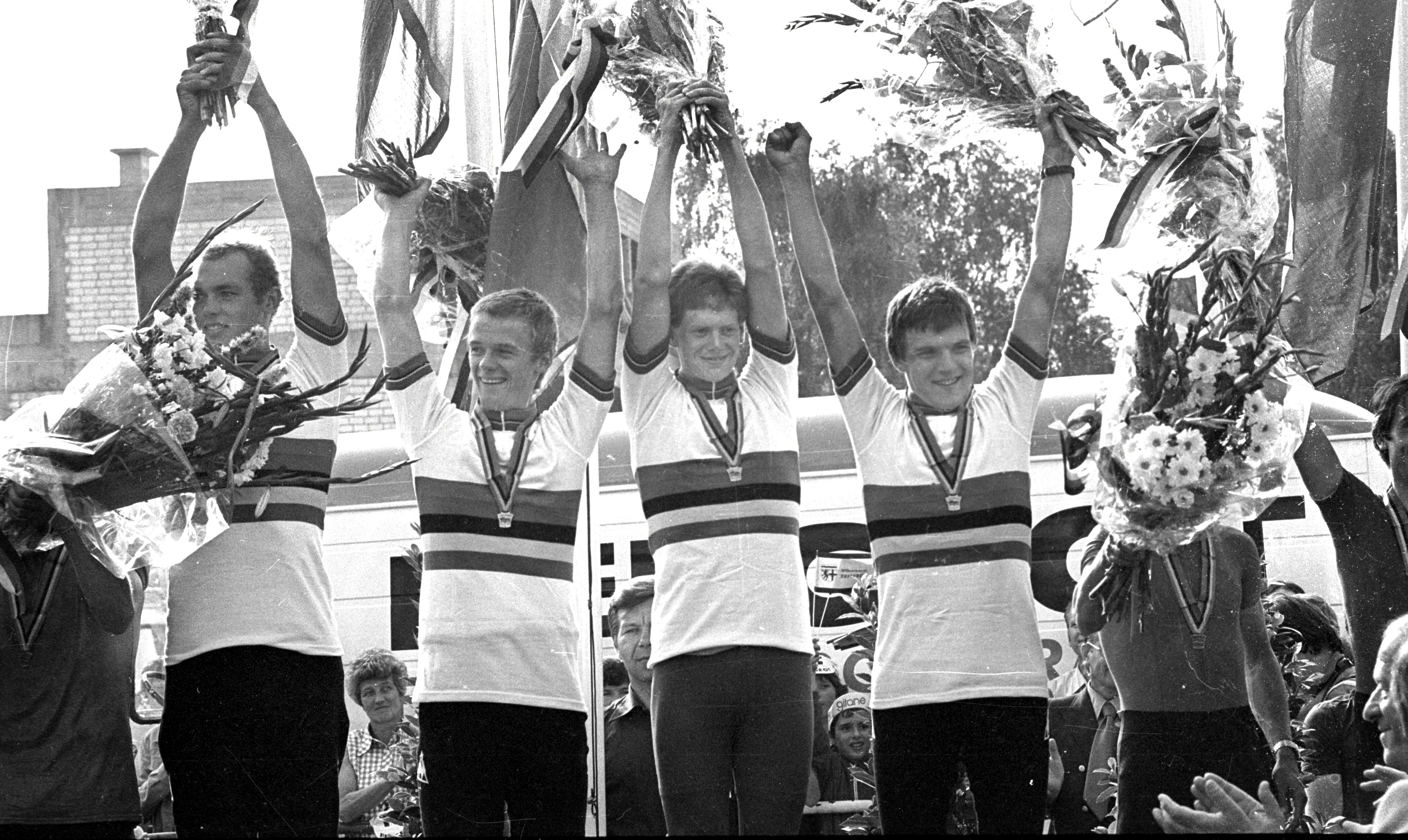

Personal information
- Born: 1 November 1956 (age 69) Dinteloord, the Netherlands

Sport
- Sport: Cycling
Medal record
Representing the Netherlands
UCI Road World Championships
Gold medal – first place	1978 Nürburgring	Team time trial

Bart van Est (born 1 November 1956) is a retired Dutch cyclist who was active between 1976 and 1983. He was part of the Dutch team that won the 1978 UCI Road World Championships in the team time trial. He also won the Ronde van Noord-Holland (1977) and individual stages of the Olympia's Tour (1977 and 1978).
