= Petr Bucháček =

Czech cyclist

Personal information
- Born: 9 June 1948 (age 78) Řetová, Czechoslovakia

Cycling career
- Sport: Cycling

Petr Bucháček (born 9 June 1948) is a Czech former cyclist. He competed in the individual road race and team time trial events at the 1976 Summer Olympics.
