= Guazzoni =

Guazzoni is a surname. Notable people with the surname include:

- Enrico Guazzoni (1876–1949), Italian screenwriter and film director
- Giorgio Guazzoni (fl. from 1990), Italian urologist

== See also ==
- Casa Guazzoni, historic building in Milan, Italy
