= Guus Bierings =

Dutch cyclist

Personal information
- Born: 28 September 1956 (age 70) Uden, the Netherlands
- Height: 1.79 m (5 ft 10 in)
- Weight: 73 kg (161 lb)

Cycling career
- Sport: Cycling
Medal record
Representing the Netherlands
UCI Road World Championships
Gold medal – first place	1978 Nürburgring	Team time trial

Gustaaf "Guus" Bierings (born 28 September 1956) is a retired Dutch cyclist who was active between 1975 and 1981. He was part of the Dutch teams that won the 1978 UCI Road World Championships and finished in 15th place at the 1980 Summer Olympics in the team time trial. He also won one stage of the Olympia's Tour in 1977.

== See also ==
- List of Dutch Olympic cyclists
