= Tord Filipsson =

Swedish cyclist (born 1950)

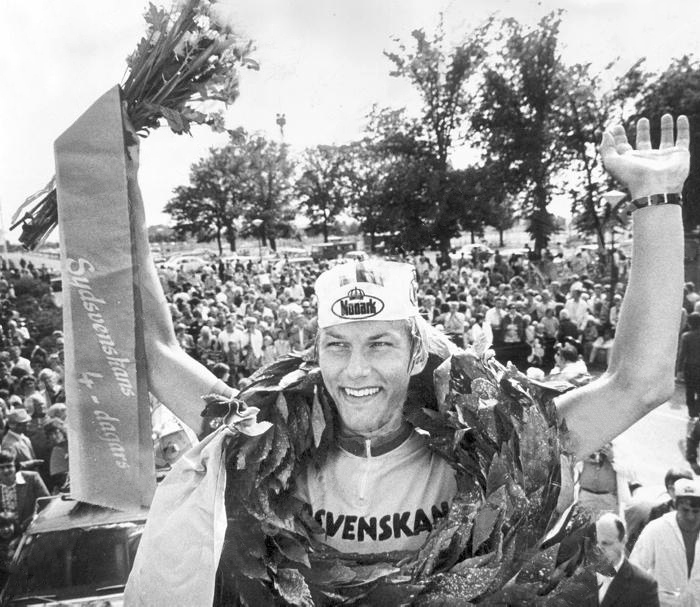
- Filipsson in 1972

Personal information
- Born: 7 May 1950 (age 76) Katrineholm, Sweden

Cycling career
- Sport: Cycling
- Current team: Skoghalls CK
Medal record
Representing Sweden
World Championships
Bronze medal – third place	1973 Barcelona	Team time trial
Gold medal – first place	1974 Montreal	Team time trial

Tord Filipsson (born 7 May 1950) is a Swedish former road cyclist. He finished sixth-seventh with the Swedish team at the 1972 and 1976 Summer Olympics. At the world championships he won a bronze medal in 1973 and a gold in 1974, both in the team time trial. Domestically he held the individual time trial title in 1972 and 1974–77.

He competed in the Tour of Britain in 1971, 1972, 1974 and 1975 and won one stage in 1971 and 1972. Overall his best result was third place in 1974 and 1975.

His younger sister Sylvia Filipsson is a former Olympics speed skater.
