= Stanisław Szozda =

Polish cyclist (1950–2013)

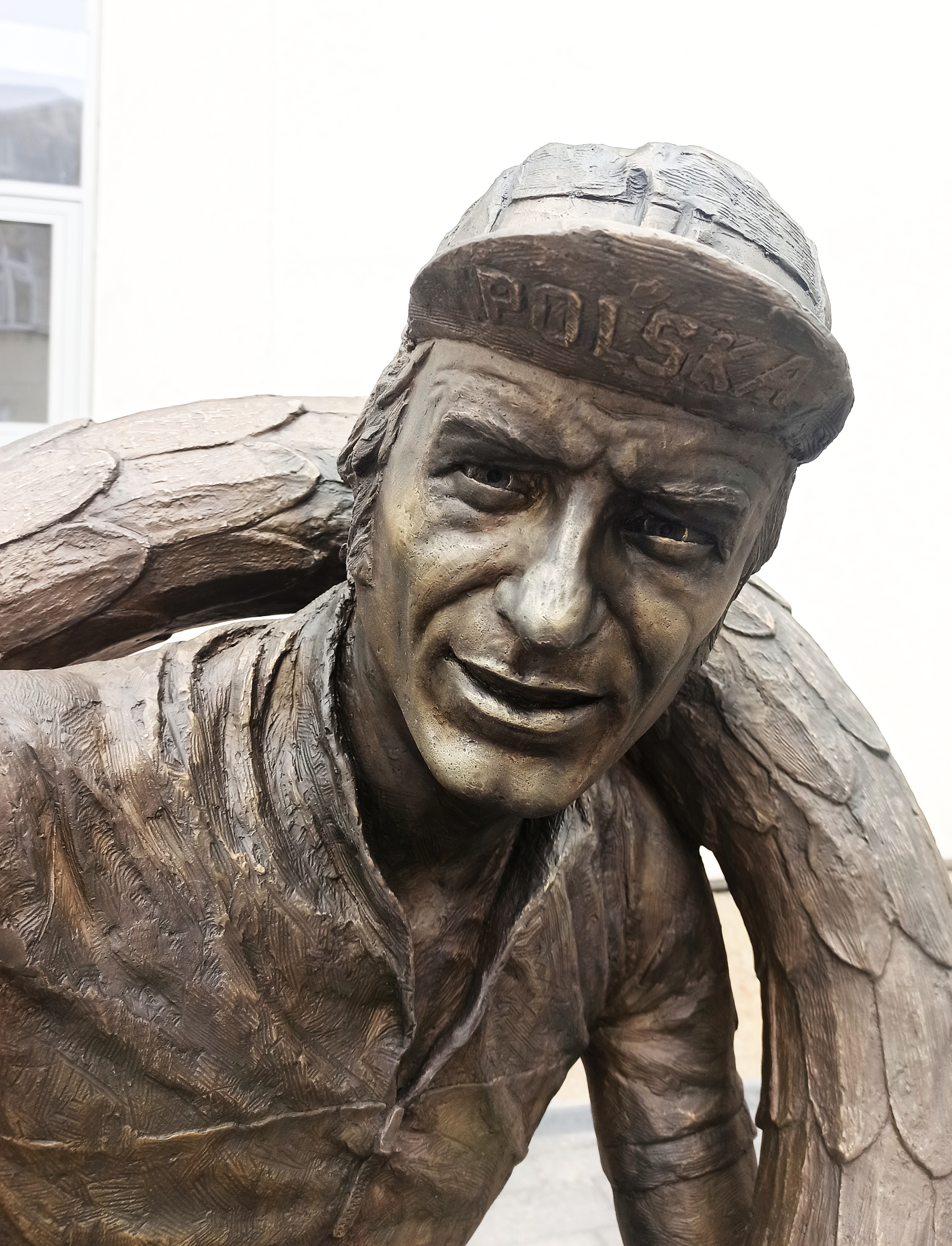
- Monument of Szozda in Prudnik

Personal information
- Born: 25 September 1950 Dobromierz, Poland
- Died: 23 September 2013 (aged 62) Wrocław, Poland
- Height: 1.73 m (5 ft 8 in)
- Weight: 68 kg (150 lb)

Sport
- Sport: Cycling
- Club: LKS Prudnik (1964-1970); Legia Warszawa (1971-1972); LZS Zieloni Opole (1972-1973); LKS Ziemia Opolska (1973-1979).
Medal record
Representing Poland
Olympic Games
Silver medal – second place	1972 Munich	Team time trial
Silver medal – second place	1976 Montreal	Team time trial
World championships
Gold medal – first place	1973 Barcelona	Team time trial
Gold medal – first place	1975 Mettet and Yvoir	Team time trial
Silver medal – second place	1973 Barcelona	Road race
Bronze medal – third place	1971 Mendrisio	Team time trial
Bronze medal – third place	1977 San Cristóbal	Team time trial

Stanisław Szozda (25 September 1950 – 23 September 2013) was an elite Polish cyclist. He had his best achievements in the 100 km team time trial. In this event he won two silver medals at the 1972 and 1976 Summer Olympics, as well as two gold and two bronze medals at the world championships in 1971, 1973, 1975 and 1977. He was less successful in the individual road race, finishing in 76th and 11th place at the 1972 and 1976 Olympics, respectively, and winning a silver medal at the 1973 UCI Road World Championships.

At the age of 9, Szozda moved to Prudnik with his family. Here he graduated from primary school (1964) and agricultural engineering (1969). He took his first cycling steps in Zarzewie Prudnik (1967–1970) under the supervision of Franciszek Surmiński.

In 1974, he won the Tour de Bretagne Cycliste, both individually and in the team competition. He also won the Tour de Pologne in 1971, Tour of Algeria in 1973, Peace Race in 1974, and Tour of Małopolska in 1976. He finished second in the Peace Race in 1976 and first in 1973 with the Polish team.

He suffered a career-ending spinal injury after a fall during the 1978 Peace Race.

After retiring from competitions he worked as a trainer in the United States with Eddie Borysewicz, and after returning to Poland did not follow the traditional route of becoming a cycling coach. He was married to Grażyna Szozda; they have a daughter Natalia and a son Radosław. Szozda was awarded the Order of Polonia Restituta.
