= Anatoly Chukanov =

Soviet cyclist (1954–2021)

Personal information
- Born: 10 May 1954 Novospasovka, Rostov Oblast, Russian SFSR, Soviet Union
- Died: 12 June 2021 (aged 67)
- Height: 1.87 m (6 ft 2 in)
- Weight: 85 kg (187 lb)

Sport
- Sport: Cycling
- Club: Spartak Luhansk
Medal record
Representing the Soviet Union
Olympic Games
Gold medal – first place	1976 Montreal	Team time trial
World championships
Gold medal – first place	1977 San Cristóbal	Team time trial

Anatoly Alekseevich Chukanov (Russian: Анатолий Алексеевич Чуканов; 10 May 1954 – 12 June 2021) was a Soviet and Russian cyclist. He was part of the Soviet team that won the 100 km team time trial at the 1976 Summer Olympics and 1977 UCI Road World Championships.

He was born in Russia, but later moved to Ukraine. After retirement he was teaching sport-related subjects at the East Ukraine Volodymyr Dahl National University. He was awarded the Order of the Badge of Honour.
