= Dino Porrini =

Italian cyclist

Personal information
- Born: 26 February 1953 (age 73) Volta Mantovana, Italy

Cycling career
- Sport: Cycling

Dino Porrini (born 26 February 1953) is an Italian former cyclist. He competed in the team time trial event at the 1976 Summer Olympics.

== Major results ==
1978
1st Stage 1 Ruota d'Oro
2nd Trofeo Laigueglia
6th GP Lugano
8th GP Alghero
1979
1st Stage 13 Giro d'Italia
6th Giro di Toscana
