= Tadeusz Mytnik =

Polish cyclist (born 1949)

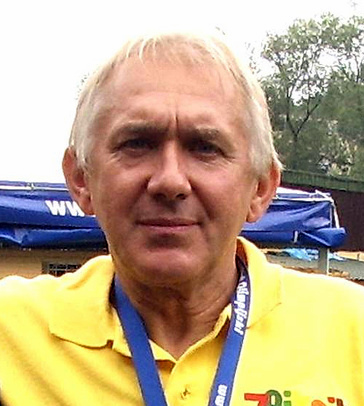
- Mytnik in 2007

Personal information
- Born: 13 August 1949 (age 77) Nowice, Poland
- Height: 1.77 m (5 ft 10 in)
- Weight: 75 kg (165 lb)

Sport
- Sport: Cycling
- Club: WKS Flota Gdynia
Medal record
Representing Poland
Olympic Games
Silver medal – second place	1976 Montreal	Team time trial
World championships
Gold medal – first place	1973 Barcelona	Team time trial
Gold medal – first place	1975 Mettet and Yvoir	Team time trial
Bronze medal – third place	1977 San Cristóbal	Team time trial

Tadeusz Mytnik (born 13 August 1949) is a retired Polish cyclist. He had his best achievements in the 100 km team time trial. In this event he won a silver medal at the 1976 Summer Olympics as well as two gold and one bronze medals at the world championships in 1973, 1975 and 1977. Individually, he won the Tour de Pologne in 1975, Tour of Małopolska in 1978, Flèche d'Or in 1981, and Szlakiem Grodów Piastowskich in 1983. In 2010 he was awarded the Order of Polonia Restituta.

After retiring from competitions he ran a bicycle shop in Gdynia and organized cycling races. He is married to Wiesława Mytnik; they have two children, Marcin (born 1976) and Agnieszka (born 1979).
