= Vito Da Ros =

Italian cyclist

Personal information
- Born: 31 May 1957 (age 69) Caneva, Italy

Cycling career
- Sport: Cycling

Vito Da Ros (born 31 May 1957) is an Italian former cyclist. He competed in the team time trial event at the 1976 Summer Olympics.
