= Petr Matoušek =

Czech cyclist (1949–2025)

Personal information
- Born: 19 December 1949 Teplice nad Bečvou, Czechoslovakia
- Died: 17 February 2025 (aged 75)

Cycling career
- Sport: Cycling

Petr Matoušek (19 December 1949 – 17 February 2025) was a Czech cyclist. He competed at the 1972 Summer Olympics and the 1976 Summer Olympics. Matoušek died on 17 February 2025, at the age of 75.
