= Mieczysław Nowicki =

Polish cyclist (born 1951)

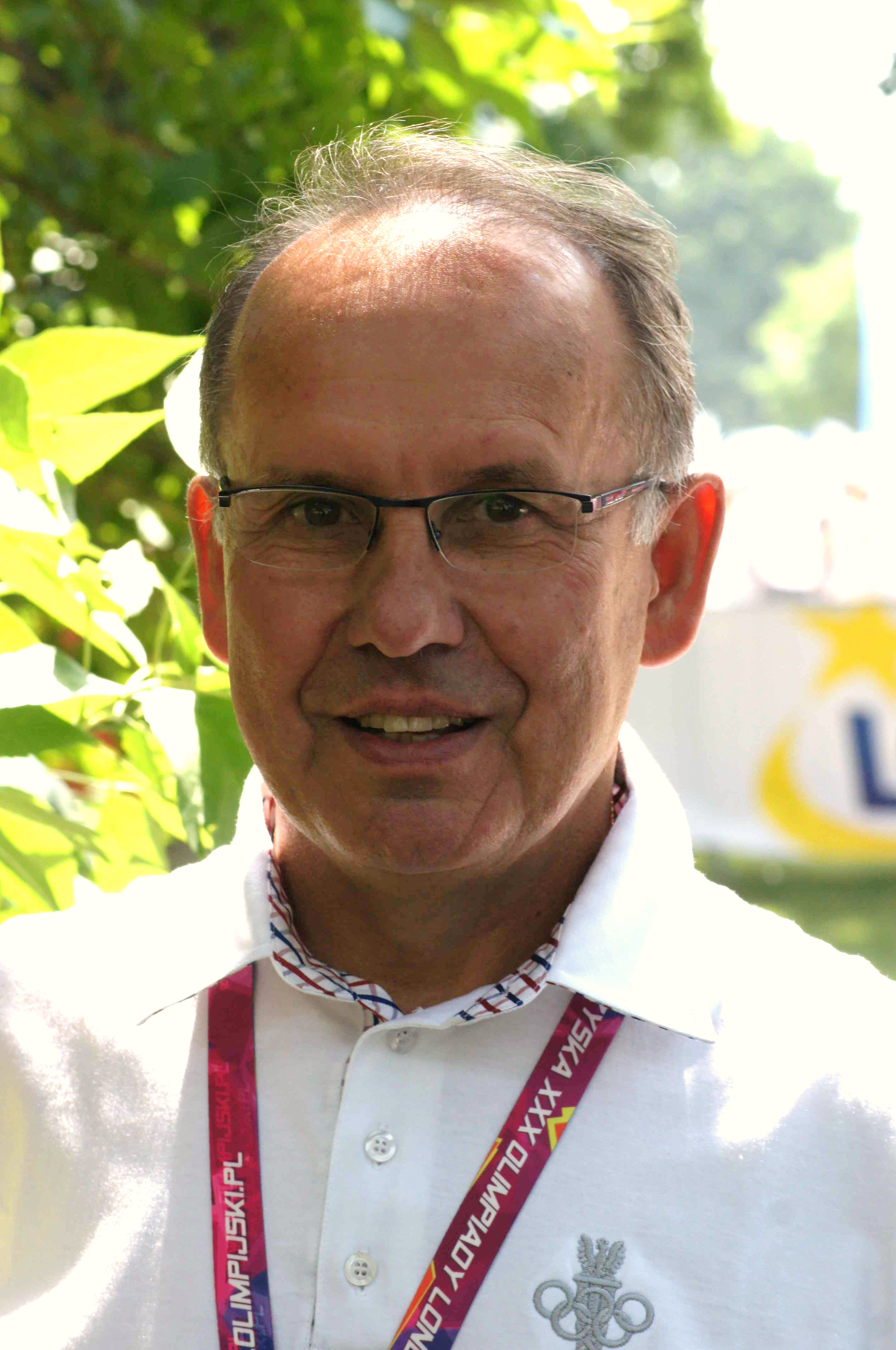
- Nowicki in 2011

Personal information
- Full name: Mieczysław Paweł Nowicki
- Born: 26 January 1951 (age 75) Piątek, Poland

Cycling career
- Sport: Cycling
- Discipline: Road
- Role: Rider
Medal record
Representing Poland
Men's road bicycle racing
Olympic Games
Silver medal – second place	1976 Montreal	Team Road Race
Bronze medal – third place	1976 Montreal	Individual Road Race

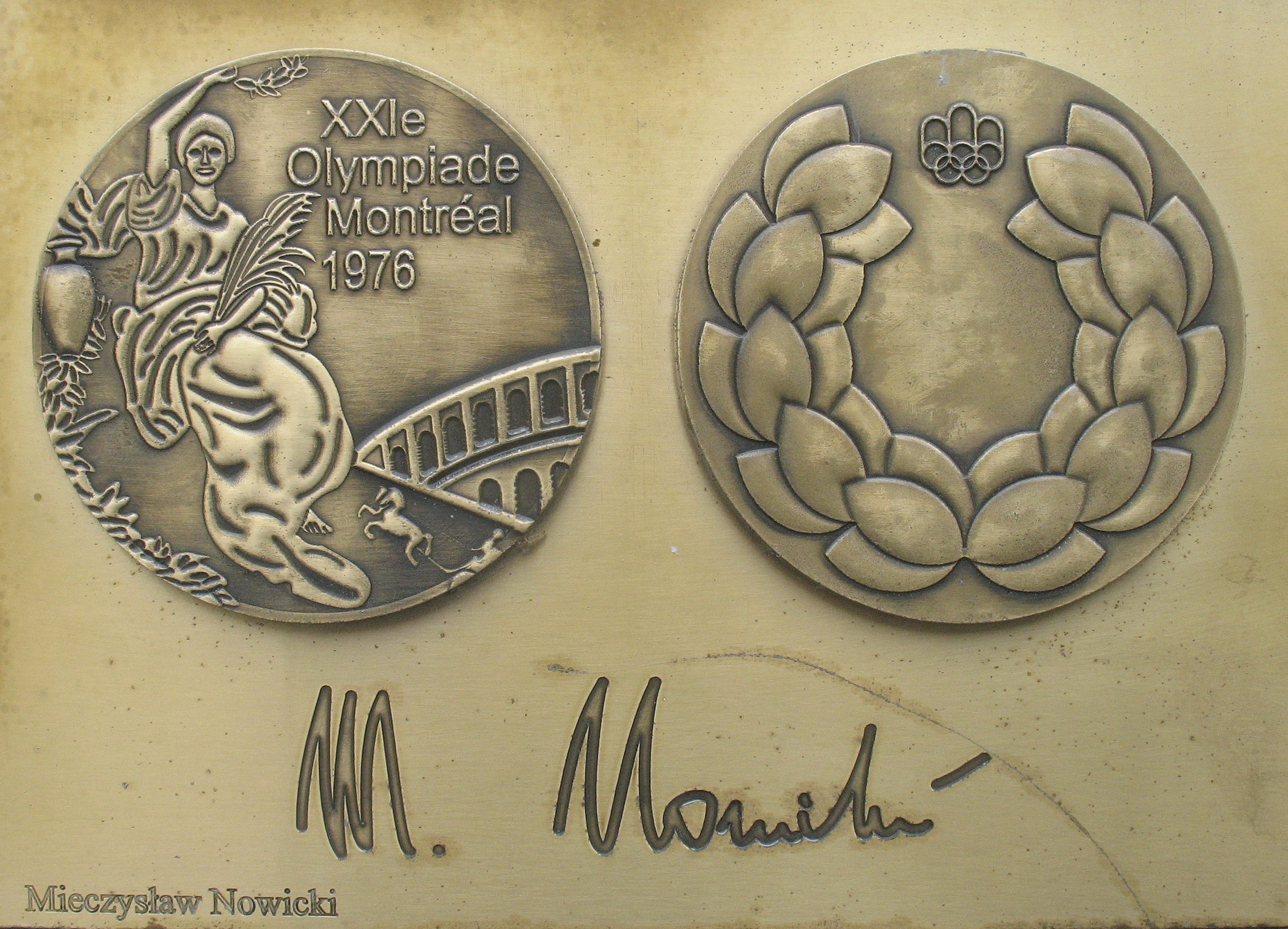
Copy of M. Nowicki medal and autograph in Sports Star Avenue in Dziwnów

Mieczysław Paweł Nowicki (born 26 January 1951, in Piątek) is a retired road bicycle racer from Poland, who represented his native country at the 1976 Summer Olympics in Montreal, Quebec, Canada. There he won the bronze medal in the men's individual road race behind Sweden's Bernt Johansson and Italy's Giuseppe Martinelli. In the men's road team trial he won the silver medal with the Polish team. He also competed at the 1972 Summer Olympics. In 1973 he set a Polish national hour record of 42.231 km, a record that stood for over 40 years until it was broken by Andrzej Bartkiewicz in 2014.
