= Ryszard Szurkowski =

Polish cyclist (1946–2021)

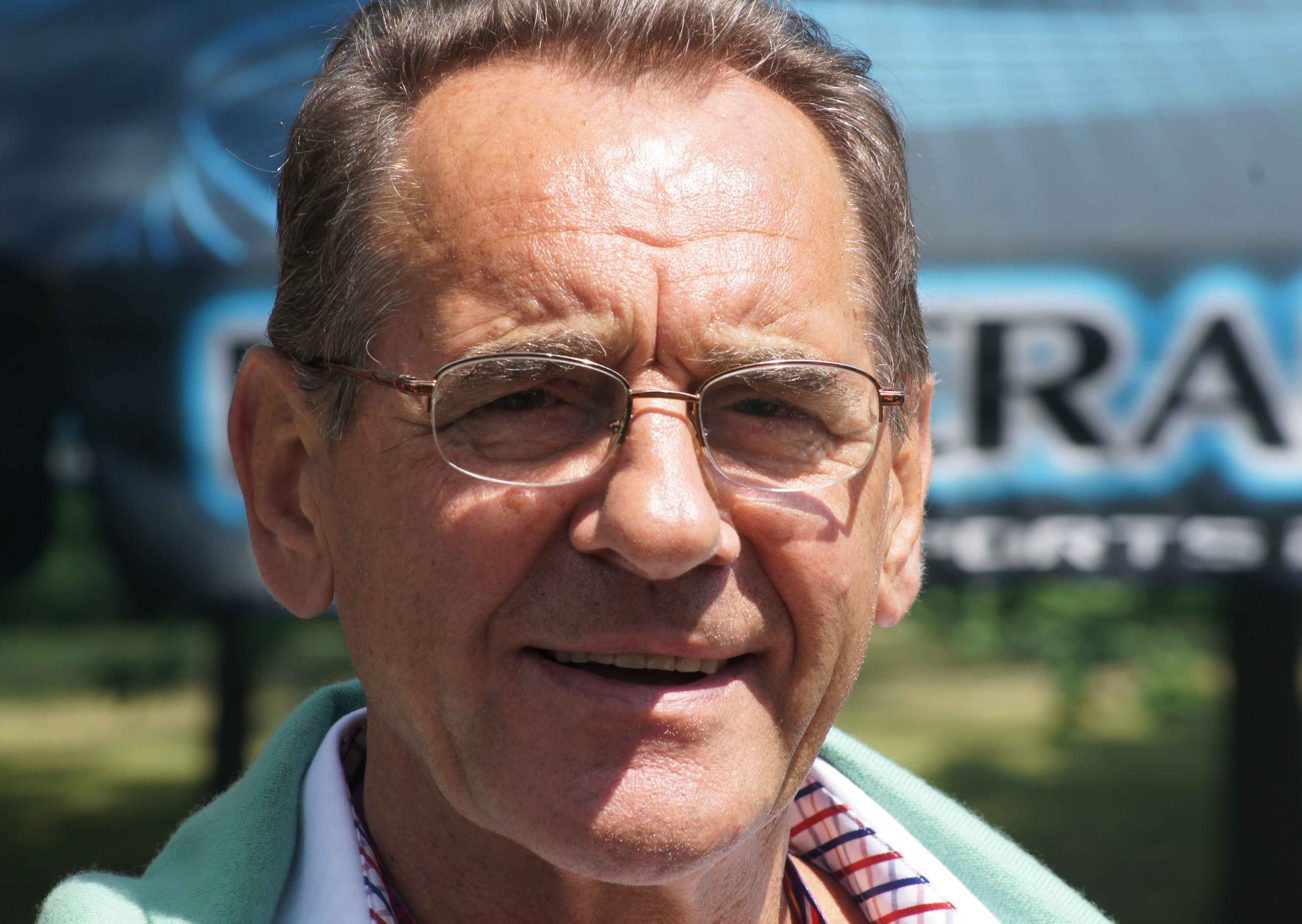

Personal information
- Full name: Ryszard Jan Szurkowski
- Born: 12 January 1946 Świebodów, Poland
- Died: 1 February 2021 (aged 75) Radom, Poland

Cycling career
- Sport: Cycling
- Discipline: Road
- Role: Rider

Major wins
- Peace Race (1970, 1971, 1973, 1975); Dookoła Mazowsza (1977, 1978)
Medal record
Representing Poland
Olympic Games
Men's road bicycle racing
Olympic Games
Silver medal – second place	1972 Munich	Team Road Race
Silver medal – second place	1976 Montreal	Team Road Race
World Cycling Amateur Championships
Gold medal – first place	1973 Barcelona	Individual Road Race
Gold medal – first place	1973 Barcelona	Team Road Race
Gold medal – first place	1975 Mettet	Team Road Race
Silver medal – second place	1974 Montreal	Individual Road Race

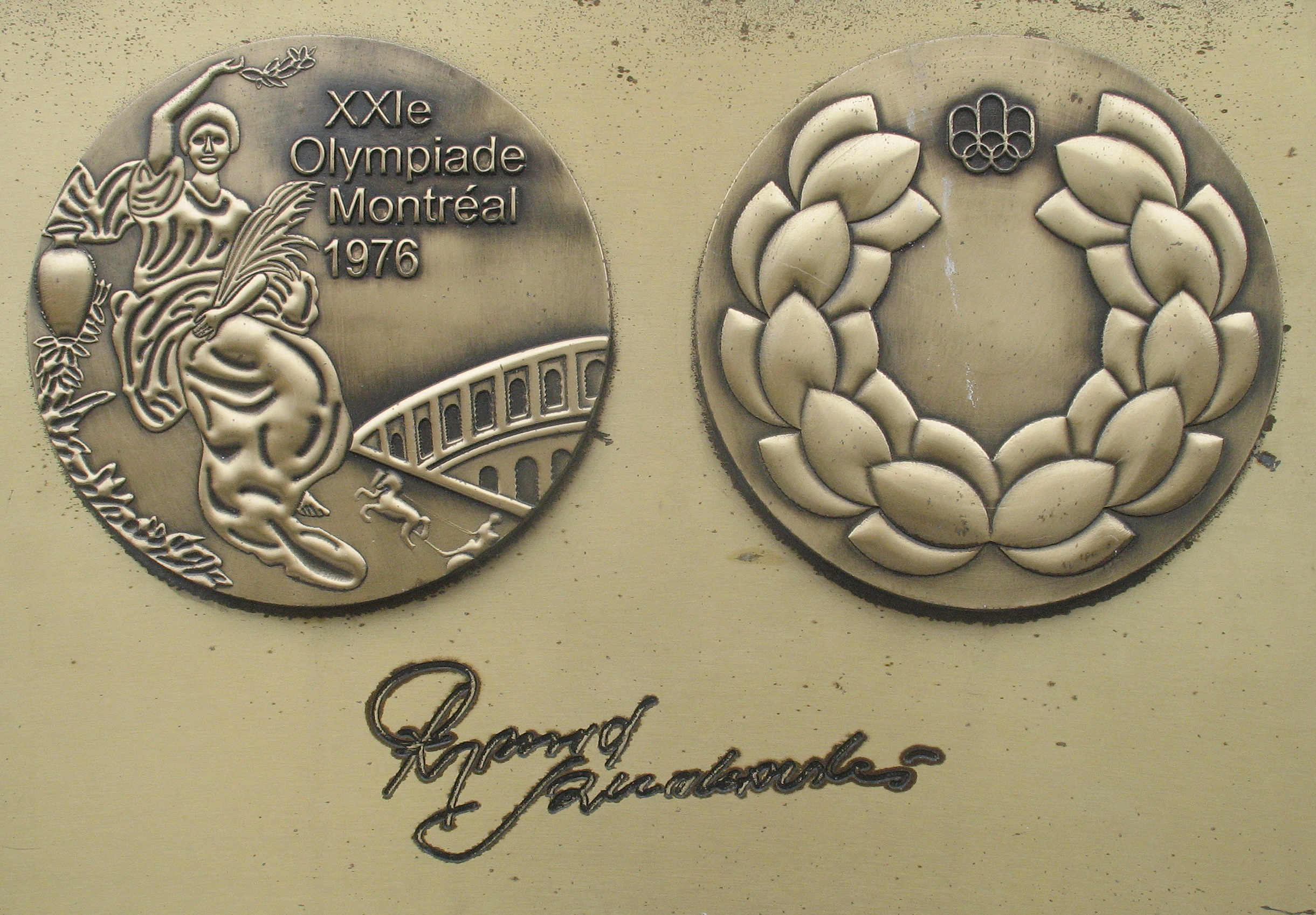
Copy of Szurkowski's medal and autograph in Sports Star Avenue in Dziwnów

Ryszard Jan Szurkowski (12 January 1946 – 1 February 2021) was a Polish road bicycle racer, widely regarded as a legend of the sport in Poland.

== Career ==
He was a silver medalist in the team trial at the 1972 and 1976 Summer Olympics, and also won three gold medals at the World Cycling Amateur Championships, two in 1973 (including one in the individual road race) and one in 1975. He won the Peace Race four times, in 1970, 1971, 1973 and 1975. He also came first twice in Dookoła Mazowsza, in 1977 and 1978. From 1998 onwards, he ran a bicycle shop in Warsaw, in the Wola district.

His son, Norbert, died in the September 11 attacks. On this day, he was supposed to fix the wallpaper in the Cantor Fitzgerald office on the 104th floor of the North Tower of the World Trade Center. He was only going to be there for a few minutes, as he wanted to leave before the offices opened at 9:00 am.

In 2018, Szurkowski crashed during a bike race in Germany, suffering serious injuries, including a crushed spinal cord that left him paralyzed. After five months of therapy, he regained some of the sensation in his toes.

He died on 1 February 2021, twenty days after his 75th birthday.
