= Canada at the 1972 Summer Olympics =

- IOC code: CAN
- NOC: Canadian Olympic Committee

in Munich, West Germany August 26–September 11, 1972
- Competitors: 208 (158 men and 50 women) in 18 sports
- Flag bearer: Doug Rogers
- Medals Ranked 27th: Gold 0 Silver 2 Bronze 3 Total 5

Summer Olympics appearances (overview)
- 1900; 1904; 1908; 1912; 1920; 1924; 1928; 1932; 1936; 1948; 1952; 1956; 1960; 1964; 1968; 1972; 1976; 1980; 1984; 1988; 1992; 1996; 2000; 2004; 2008; 2012; 2016; 2020; 2024

Other related appearances
- 1906 Intercalated Games

Canada competed at the 1972 Summer Olympics in Munich, West Germany, held from 26 August to 11 September 1972. 208 competitors, 158 men and 50 women, took part in 136 events in 18 sports. As the country hosted the next Olympics in Montreal, the Canadian flag was raised at the closing ceremony.

== Medallists ==
Canada finished in 27th position in the final medal rankings, with two silver medals and three bronze medals.

=== Silver ===
- Bruce Robertson – Swimming, men's 100m Butterfly
- Leslie Cliff – Swimming, women's 400m Individual Medley

=== Bronze ===
- Donna Gurr – Swimming, women's 200m Backstroke
- Erik Fish, William Mahony, Bruce Robertson, and Robert Kasting – Swimming, men's 4 × 100 m Medley Relay
- David Miller, John Ekels, and Paul Cote – Sailing, Soling class

== Archery ==
In the first modern archery competition at the Olympics, Canada entered three men and three women. Their highest placing competitor was Donald Jackson, who finished in 6th place in the men's competition. His score was only 30 points below the bronze medal score.

Men's individual competition:

- Donald Jackson – 2437 points (→ 6th place)
- Elmer Ewert – 2359 points (→ 25th place)
- Wayne Pullen – 2275 points (→ 41st place)

Women's individual competition:

- Mary Grant – 2350 points (→ 11th place)
- Marjory Saunders – 2192 points (→ 32nd place)
- Viola Muir – 1955 points (→ 39th place)

== Athletics ==
Men's 1,500 metres

- Kenneth Elmer
  - Heat – 3:46.6 (→ did not advance)
- Bill Smart
  - Heat – 3:49.2 (→ did not advance)

Men's 5,000 metres

- Robert Finlay
  - Heat – 13:44.0 (→ did not advance)
- Grant McLaren
  - Heat – 13:43.8 (→ did not advance)

Men's high jump

- John Beers
  - Qualifying Round – 2.15m
  - Final – 2.15m (→ 6th place)
- John Hawkins
  - Qualifying Round – 2.15m
  - Final – 2.15m (→ 9th place)
- Richard Cuttell
  - Qualification Round – 2.09m (→ did not advance)

== Boxing ==
Men's flyweight (– 51 kg)

- Chris Ius
  - First round – bye
  - Second round – defeated Ali Ouabbou (MAR), 3:2
  - Third Round – lost to Georgi Kostadinov (BUL), 0:5

Men's bantamweight (– 54 kg)

- Les Hamilton
  - First round – lost to Stefan Förster (GDR), 1:4

Men's featherweight (– 57 kg)

- Dale Anderson

Men's lightweight (– 60 kg)

- José Martinez

Men's Heavyweight (+ 81 kg)

- Carroll Morgan
  - First round – defeated Fatai Ayinla (NGA), 3:2
  - Quarterfinals – lost to Hasse Thomsén (SWE), KO-3

== Cycling ==
Nine cyclists represented Canada in 1972.

Individual road race

- Brian Chewter – 52nd place
- Tom Morris – 62nd place
- Gilles Durand – 72nd place
- Lindsay Gauld – did not finish (→ no ranking)

Team time trial

- Gilles Durand
- Brian Chewter
- Jack McCullough
- Tom Morris

Sprint

- Ed McRae

1000m time trial

- Jocelyn Lovell
  - Final – 1:09.03 (→ 15th place)

Individual pursuit

- Ron Hayman

Individual pursuit

- Jocelyn Lovell
- Brian Keast
- Ron Hayman
- Ed McRae

== Diving ==
Men's 3m springboard

- Scott Cranham – 339.21 points (→ 14th place)
- Ken Sully – 336.12 points (→ 16th place)
- Ron Friesen – 313.11 points (→ 25th place)

Men's 10m platform

- Ron Friesen – 272.94 points (→ 20th place)
- Scott Cranham – 263.52 points (→ 27th place)
- Ken Sully – 262.26 points (→ 29th place)

Women's 3m springboard

- Beverly Boys – 418.89 points (→ 5th place)
- Teri York – 247.14 points (→ 19th place)
- Elizabeth Carruthers – 243.84 (→ 20th place)

Women's 10m platform

- Nancy Robertson – 334.02 points (→ 7th place)
- Kathleen Rollo – 317.31 points (→ 9th place)
- Beverly Boys – 183.99 points (→ 14th place)

== Equestrian ==
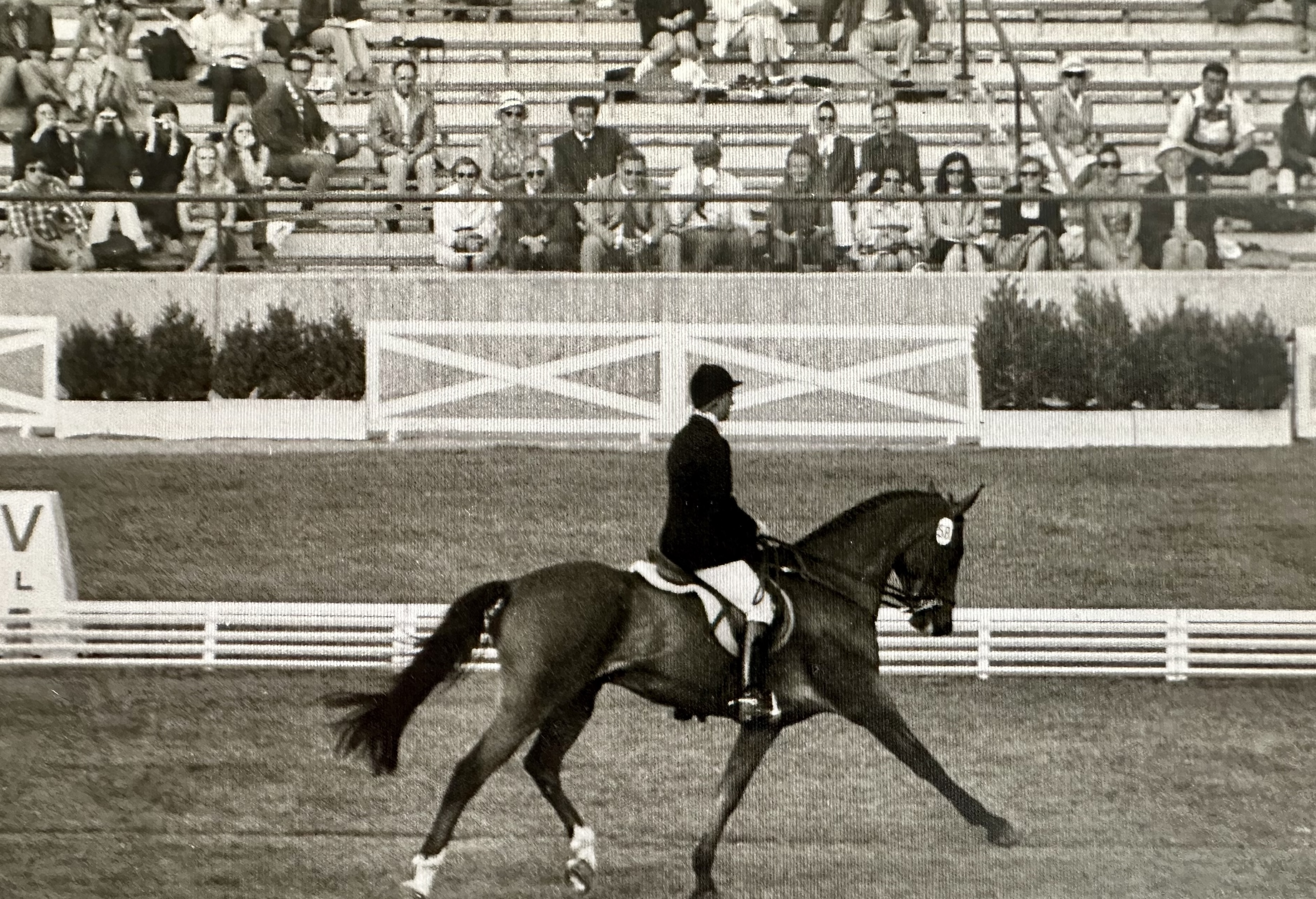
Wendy Dell and High Wind performing at the dressage phase, representing Canada at the 1972 Olympic Games in Munich Germany

== Fencing ==
Six fencers, five men and one woman, represented Canada in 1972.

Men's foil

- Herbert Obst
- Magdy Conyd
- Lester Wong

Men's team foil

- Magdy Conyd, Herbert Obst, Gerry Wiedel, Lester Wong

Men's épée

- Gerry Wiedel
- Lester Wong
- Herbert Obst

Men's team épée

- Magdy Conyd, Herbert Obst, Gerry Wiedel, Lester Wong

Men's sabre

- Bob Foxcroft

Women's foil

- Donna Hennyey

== Modern pentathlon ==
Three male pentathletes represented Canada in 1972. It was the first time Canada had entered pentathletes at the Olympics, and the team was coached by Hungarian-born Joseph Bucsko (1930–1996).

Individual:

- Scott Scheuermann – 4072 points (→ 54th place)
- Kenneth Maaten – 3987 points (→ 56th place)
- George Skene – 3297 points (→ 59th place)

Team:

- Scheuermann, Maaten, and Skene – 11335 points (→ 19th place)

== Rowing ==
Men's coxed pair

- Trevor Josephson, Mike Neary and Glenn Battersby
  - Heat – 7:49.54
  - Repechage – 8:12.69
  - Semi-finals – 8:28.62
  - B-Final – 8:00.27 (→ 9th place)

== Shooting ==
Ten male shooters represented Canada in 1972.

25 m pistol

- Jules Sobrian
- William Hare

50 m pistol

- Edward Jans
- Jules Sobrian

50 m rifle, three positions

- Alf Mayer
- Arne Sorensen

50 m rifle, prone

- Alf Mayer
- Gil Boa

Trap

- John Primrose
- James Platz

Skeet

- Bruno De Costa
- Donald Sanderlin

== Swimming ==
Men's 100m freestyle

- Brian Phillips
  - Heat – 53.75s
  - Semifinals – 53.73s (→ did not advance)
- Robert Kasting
  - Heat – 54.07s
  - Semifinals – 53.62s (→ did not advance)
- Bruce Robertson
  - Heat – 54.76s (→ did not advance)

Men's 200m freestyle

- Ralph Hutton
  - Heat – 1:56.84
  - Final – 1:57.56 (→ 8th place)
- Bruce Robertson
  - Heat – 1:59.02 (→ did not advance)
- Ian MacKenzie
  - Heat – 2:01.22 (→ did not advance)

Men's 4 × 100 m freestyle Relay

- Brian Phillips, Bruce Robertson, Tim Bach, and Robert Kasting
  - Heat – 3:35.64
- Bruce Robertson, Brian Phillips, Tim Bach, and Robert Kasting
  - Final – 3:33.20 (→ 5th place)

Men's 4 × 200 m freestyle Relay

- Ralph Hutton, Deane Buckboro, Ian MacKenzie and Brian Phillips
  - Heat – 7:57.69
- Bruce Robertson, Brian Phillips, Ian MacKenzie, and Ralph Hutton
  - Final – 7:53.61 (→ 7th place)

== Water polo ==
Men's team competition

- Preliminary round (group A)
  - Lost to Yugoslavia (4–12)
  - Lost to Mexico (3–7)
  - Lost to United States (1–8)
  - Lost to Romania (4–16)
  - Lost to Cuba (2–7) → did not advance
- Team roster
  - William van der Pol
  - Allan Pyle
  - Patrick Pugliese
  - Clifford Barry
  - Donald Packer
  - Stephen Hart
  - Jack Gauldie
  - Robert Thompson
  - David Hart
  - Gabor Csepregi
  - Guy Leclerc
