= Norway at the 1968 Summer Olympics =

- IOC code: NOR
- NOC: Norwegian Olympic Committee

in Mexico City
- Competitors: 46 in 11 sports
- Flag bearer: Berit Berthelsen (athletics)
- Medals Ranked 25th: Gold 1 Silver 1 Bronze 0 Total 2

Summer Olympics appearances (overview)
- 1900; ~~1904~~; 1908; 1912; 1920; 1924; 1928; 1932; 1936; 1948; 1952; 1956; 1960; 1964; 1968; 1972; 1976; 1980; 1984; 1988; 1992; 1996; 2000; 2004; 2008; 2012; 2016; 2020; 2024; 2028

Other related appearances
- 1906 Intercalated Games

Norway competed at the 1968 Summer Olympics in Mexico City. 46 competitors, 38 men and 8 women, took part in 36 events in 11 sports.

== Medalists ==
=== Gold ===
- Egil Søby, Steinar Amundsen, Tore Berger, and Jan Johansen — Canoeing, Men's K4 1,000m Kayak Fours

=== Silver ===
- Peder Lunde, jr. and Per Olav Wiken — Sailing, Men's Star Team Competition

== Athletics ==
Men's 1500 metres

- Arne Kvalheim

- Heat — 3:47.50 min (→ advanced to the semi-final)
- Semi final — 3:55.32 min (→ did not advance)

Men's 3000 metres steeplechase

- Arne Risa

- Heat — 9:07.31 min (→ advanced to the final)
- Final — 9:09.98 min (→ 8th place)

Men's 110 metres hurdles

- Kjellfred Weum

- Heat — 14.08 s (→ advanced to the semi-final)
- Semi final — 14.04 s (→ did not advance)

Women's high jump

- Anne Lise Wærness

- Qualification — 1.60 m (→ did not advance)

Women's long jump

- Berit Berthelsen

- Qualification — 6.48 m (→ advanced to the final)
- Final — 6.40 m (→ 7th place)

Women's pentathlon

- Berit Berthelsen — 4649 pts (→ 18th place)

== Cycling ==
Six cyclists represented Norway in 1968.

Individual road race

- Thorleif Andresen
- Tore Milsett
- Jan Erik Gustavsen
- Ørnulf Andresen

Team time trial

- Thorleif Andresen
- Ørnulf Andresen
- Tore Milsett
- Leif Yli

Individual pursuit

- Knut Knudsen

== Fencing ==
Men's épée

- Jan von Koss
- Dag Midling

== Shooting ==
Four shooters, all men, represented Norway in 1968.

50 m pistol

- John Rødseth

300 m rifle, three positions

- Elling Øvergård
- Bjørn Bakken

50 m rifle, three positions

- Bjørn Bakken
- Elling Øvergård

50 m rifle, prone

- Bjørn Bakken
- Elling Øvergård

Trap

- Kjell Sørensen

== Swimming ==
Men

Athlete	Event	Heat		Semifinal		Final	
Athlete	Event	Time	Rank	Time	Rank	Time	Rank
Ørjan Madsen	100 m freestyle	56.3	30	Did not advance			
Ørjan Madsen	200 m freestyle	2:05.4	27	—N/a		Did not advance	
Ørjan Madsen	400 m freestyle	4:31.8	21	—N/a		Did not advance	
