= Norway at the 1972 Summer Olympics =

- IOC code: NOR
- NOC: Norwegian Olympic Committee

in Munich
- Competitors: 112 (101 men, 11 women) in 15 sports
- Flag bearer: Harald Barlie (wrestling)
- Medals Ranked 21st: Gold 2 Silver 1 Bronze 1 Total 4

Summer Olympics appearances (overview)
- 1900; 1904; 1908; 1912; 1920; 1924; 1928; 1932; 1936; 1948; 1952; 1956; 1960; 1964; 1968; 1972; 1976; 1980; 1984; 1988; 1992; 1996; 2000; 2004; 2008; 2012; 2016; 2020; 2024

Other related appearances
- 1906 Intercalated Games

Norway was represented at the 1972 Summer Olympics in Munich by the Norwegian Olympic Committee and Confederation of Sports. 112 competitors, 101 men and 11 women, took part in 70 events in 15 sports.

== Medalists ==
Norway finished in 21st position in the final medal rankings, with two gold medals and four medals overall.

=== Gold ===
- Knut Knudsen — Cycling, Men's 4,000m Individual Pursuit
- Leif Jenssen — Weightlifting, Men's Light Heavyweight

=== Silver ===
- Frank Hansen and Svein Thøgersen — Rowing, Men's Double Sculls

=== Bronze ===
- Egil Søby, Steinar Amundsen, Tore Berger, and Jan Johansen — Canoeing, Men's K4 1,000m Kayak Fours

== Archery ==
In the first modern archery competition at the Olympics, Norway entered one woman and three men in the competition. Their best finisher, at 32nd place in the men's competition, was Jan Erik Humlekjær.

Men's Individuel Competition:

- Jan Erik Humlekjær - 2339 points (→ 32nd place)
- Johannes Akkerhaugen - 2288 points (→ 36th place)
- Egil Borgen Johansen - 2219 points (→ 48th place)

Women's Individual Competition:

- Brit Stav - 1929 points (40th place)

== Athletics ==
Men's 100 metres

- Audun Garshol

- Heat — 10.49 s (→ advanced to the quarter-final)
- Quarter final — 10.55 s (→ did not advance)

Men's 200 metres

- Audun Garshol

- Heat — 21.16 s (→ advanced to the quarter-final)
- Quarter final — 25.30 s (→ did not advance)

Women's 1500 metres

- Wenche Sørum

- Heat — 4:14.10 min (→ advanced to the semi-final)
- Semi final — 4:09.70 min (→ did not advance)

- Grete Waitz

- Heat — 4:16.00 min (→ did not advance)

Men's 5000 metres

- Per Halle

- Heat — 13:38.6 min (→ advanced to the final)
- Final — 13:34.38 min (→ 7th place)

- Arne Risa

- Heat — 14:01.6 min (→ did not advance)

- Knut Børø

- Heat — 14:15.8 min (→ did not advance)

Men's 10,000 metres

- Arne Risa

- Heat — 14:01.6 min (→ did not advance)

Men's 3000 metres steeplechase

- Jan Voje

- Heat — 8:42.0 min (→ did not advance)

- Sverre Sørnes

- Heat — 8:54.8 min (→ did not advance)

Men's High Jump

- Leif Roar Falkum

- Qualification — NM (→ did not advance)

Men's Long Jump

- Finn Bendixen

- Qualification — 7.61 m (→ did not advance)

Men's triple jump

- Kristen Fløgstad

- Qualification — 16.41 m (→ advanced to the final)
- Final — 16.44 m (→ 8th place)

Men's Javelin Throw

- Bjørn Grimnes

- Round 1 — 77.54 metres (→ advanced to the final)
- Final — 83.08 metres (→ 5th place)

Men's 20 km walk

- Jan Rolstad — 1:33:03 hrs (→ 11th place)

Men's 50 km walk

- Kjell Georg Lund — 4:34.23 hrs (→ 24th place)

== Cycling ==
Seven cyclists represented Norway in 1972.

Individual road race

- Tore Milsett — 17th place
- Thorleif Andresen — 70th place
- Arve Haugen — did not finish (→ no ranking)
- Jan Henriksen — did not finish (→ no ranking)

Team time trial

- Thorleif Andresen
- Arve Haugen
- Knut Knudsen
- Magne Orre

1000m time trial

- Harald Bundli

- Final — 1:09.72 (→ 18th place)

Individual pursuit

- Knut Knudsen

== Diving ==
Men's 3m Springboard:

- Roar Løken — 514.92 points (→ 10th place)

== Fencing ==
Five fencers, all men, represented Norway in 1972.

Men's épée

- Morten von Krogh
- Ole Mørch
- Jeppe Normann

Men's team épée

- Jan von Koss, Jeppe Normann, Ole Mørch, Claus Mørch Jr.

== Handball ==
Norway's 1-1-1 record in the first round put the team in a tie for second place with West Germany (which was the team that Norway had tied), but the advantage went to the West Germans and Norway's third-place finish put them into the ninth- to twelfth-place consolation bracket. They defeated Japan to set up a match with Poland for ninth and tenth places, which Norway won.

Men's Team Competition:

- Norway - 9th place (3-1-1)

== Rowing ==
Men's Coxed Pairs

- Rolf Andreassen, Arne Bergodd and Thor-Egil Olsen

- Heat — 8:00.56
- Repechage — 8:03.50
- Semi-finals — 8:30.29

== Shooting ==
Seven male shooters represented Norway in 1972.

25 m pistol

- Thor-Øistein Endsjø

50 m pistol

- John Rødseth

300 m rifle, three positions

- Helge Anshushaug
- Bjørn Bakken

50 m rifle, three positions

- Bjørn Bakken
- Helge Anshushaug

50 m rifle, prone

- Helge Anshushaug
- Jens Nygård

50 m running target

- John H. Larsen, Jr.
- Tore Skau

== Swimming ==
Men's 100m Freestyle

- Fritz Warncke

- Heat — 54.41s (→ 22nd place, did not advance)

Men's 200m Freestyle

- Fritz Warncke

- Heat — 2:00.98 (→ 31st place, did not advance)

Men's 400m Freestyle

- Sverre Kile

- Heat — 4:20.86 (→ did not advance)

Men's 400m Medley

- Sverre Kile

- Heat — 4:59,72 (→ did not advance)

Women's 100m Freestyle

- Grethe Mathisen

- Heat — 1:01.47 (→ 17th place, did not advance)

Women's 200m Medley

- Trine Krogh

- Heat — 5:25,08 (→ did not advance)

Women's 400m Medley

- Trine Krogh

- Heat — 2:36,27 (→ did not advance)
