= Cycling at the 1972 Summer Olympics – Men's individual road race =

Men's cycling road race at the Games of the XX Olympiad
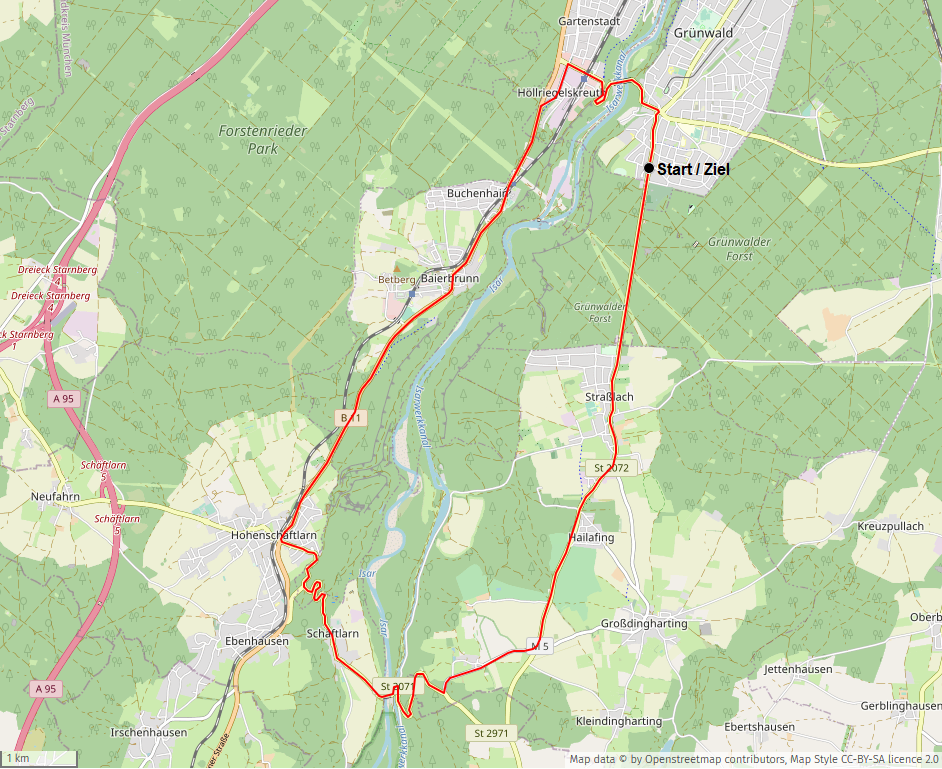
- The course
- Venue: Munich, West Germany
- Date: 7 September 1972
- Competitors: 163 from 48 nations
- Winning time: 4:14:37

Medalists
1st place, gold medalist(s)		Hennie Kuiper; Netherlands
2nd place, silver medalist(s)		Clyde Sefton; Australia
3rd place, bronze medalist(s)		not awarded

In cycling at the 1972 Summer Olympics, the men's individual road race was held on 7 September. There were 163 starters from 48 nations. The maximum per NOC was four. A total of 76 cyclists finished the race. The event was won by Hennie Kuiper of the Netherlands, the nation's first victory in the men's individual road race and first medal in the event since 1948. Clyde Sefton earned Australia's first medal in the event with his silver. Jaime Huélamo of Spain finished third, but was disqualified after failing a drug test; the medal was not reassigned. Bruce Biddle of New Zealand was not awarded the bronze medal as he had not been tested for drugs. Italy missed the podium, breaking a four-Games streak of gold and silver medals.

== Irish protesters ==
Seven members of the National Cycling Association (NCA) were arrested for disrupting the event. The Union Cycliste Internationale (UCI) recognised separate national federations on either side of the Irish political border. The NCA was an Irish Republican all-Ireland body not affiliated to the ICU. Three NCA members delayed the start by distributing leaflets, and the other four joined mid-race to ambush Irish competitor Noel Teggart, causing a minor pile-up.

== Background ==
This was the ninth appearance of the event, previously held in 1896 and then at every Summer Olympics since 1936. It replaced the individual time trial event that had been held from 1912 to 1932 (and which would be reintroduced alongside the road race in 1996). Freddy Maertens of Belgium was favored; he had finished second to Régis Ovion (also racing in Munich) at the 1971 world championships and won 50 races in 1971 and 1972.

Cameroon, Jamaica, Malawi, and Togo each made their debut in the men's individual road race; East Germany competed separately for the first time. Great Britain made its ninth appearance in the event, the only nation to have competed in each appearance to date.

== Competition format and course ==
The mass-start race was on a 200 kilometre course. It was a "relatively easy and flat" course.

== Schedule ==
All times are Central European Time (UTC+1)

Date	Time	Round
Thursday, 7 September 1972	10:00	Final

== Results ==
The field was relatively tight until lap 6, when a pack of 35 cyclists broke away to form a lead group. Kuiper made his move in the last lap, gaining significant separation from the pack.

Rank	Cyclist	Nation	Time
1st place, gold medalist(s)	Hennie Kuiper	Netherlands	4:14:37
2nd place, silver medalist(s)	Clyde Sefton	Australia	4:15:04
DSQ	Jaime Huélamo	Spain	~~4:15:04~~ (Note: Jaime Huélamo (ESP) was disqualified after he tested positive for nikethamide (Coramine). Biddle was not awarded the bronze medal as he had not been tested for drugs.)
4	Bruce Biddle	New Zealand	4:15:04
5	Phil Bayton	Great Britain	+ 30"
6	Phil Edwards	Great Britain	+ 30"
7	Wilfried Trott	West Germany	+ 30"
8	Francesco Moser	Italy	+ 36"
9	Miguel Samacá	Colombia	+ 36"
10	Jesús Sarabia	Mexico	+ 36"
11	Piet van Katwijk	Netherlands	+ 36"
12	Cees Priem	Netherlands	+ 36"
13	Freddy Maertens	Belgium	+ 36"
14	Roman Humenberger	Austria	+ 36"
15	Régis Ovion	France	+ 36"
16	Francisco Elorriaga	Spain	+ 36"
17	Tore Milsett	Norway	+ 36"
18	Jiří Prchal	Czechoslovakia	+ 36"
19	Bruno Hubschmid	Switzerland	+ 36"
20	Iwan Schmid	Switzerland	+ 36"
21	Jørgen Marcussen	Denmark	+ 36"
22	Erwin Tischler	West Germany	+ 36"
23	András Takács	Hungary	+ 36"
24	Ueli Sutter	Switzerland	+ 36"
25	Fedor den Hertog	Netherlands	+ 36"
26	Fernando Cruz	Colombia	+ 36"
27	Erny Kirchen	Luxembourg	+ 36"
28	Ove Jensen	Denmark	+ 36"
29	Graeme Jose	Australia	+ 44"
30	Karl-Heinz Oberfranz	East Germany	+ 2' 32"
31	Ryszard Szurkowski	Poland	+ 2' 32"
32	John Trevorrow	Australia	+ 2' 32"
33	Wolfgang Wesemann	East Germany	+ 2' 32"
34	Valery Likhachov	Soviet Union	+ 2' 32"
35	Anatoly Starkov	Soviet Union	+ 2' 32"
36	Lucjan Lis	Poland	+ 2' 32"
37	José Viejo	Spain	+ 2' 32"
38	Liam Horner	Ireland	+ 2' 32"
39	Bernard Bourreau	France	+ 2' 32"
40	Kieron McQuaid	Ireland	+ 2' 32"
41	Jiří Háva	Czechoslovakia	+ 2' 32"
42	Lennart Fagerlund	Sweden	+ 2' 32"
43	Radoš Čubrić	Yugoslavia	+ 2' 32"
44	Sven-Åke Nilsson	Sweden	+ 2' 32"
45	Gustaaf Hermans	Belgium	+ 2' 32"
46	Johann Summer	Austria	+ 2' 32"
47	Petr Matoušek	Czechoslovakia	+ 2' 32"
48	Henning Jørgensen	Denmark	+ 2' 32"
49	Walter Riccomi	Italy	+ 2' 32"
50	Paul Brydon	New Zealand	+ 2' 32"
51	Jože Valenčič	Yugoslavia	+ 2' 32"
52	Brian Chewter	Canada	+ 2' 32"
53	Tekeste Woldu	Ethiopia	+ 2' 32"
54	Tomás Nistal	Spain	+ 2' 32"
55	Wolfgang Steinmayr	Austria	+ 2' 32"
56	Lucien Didier	Luxembourg	+ 2' 32"
57	Alfred Gaida	West Germany	+ 2' 32"
58	Donald Allan	Australia	+ 2' 32"
59	Lucien De Brauwere	Belgium	+ 2' 32"
60	Teodor Vasile	Romania	+ 2' 32"
61	John Howard	United States	+ 2' 32"
62	Tom Morris	Canada	+ 2' 32"
63	John Allis	United States	+ 2' 32"
64	Tibor Debreceni	Hungary	+ 2' 32"
65	Marcel Duchemin	France	+ 2' 32"
66	Juan Morales	Colombia	+ 2' 32"
67	Imre Géra	Hungary	+ 2' 32"
68	Peter Weibel	West Germany	+ 2' 32"
69	Peter Doyle	Ireland	+ 2' 32"
70	Thorleif Andresen	Norway	+ 2' 32"
71	Rudolf Mitteregger	Austria	+ 2' 32"
72	Gilles Durand	Canada	+ 2' 36"
73	Ali Hüryılmaz	Turkey	+ 2' 36"
74	Walter Tardáguila	Uruguay	+ 2' 51"
75	Gregorio Aldo Arencibia	Cuba	+ 4' 17"
76	Stanisław Szozda	Poland	+ 6' 04"
—	Roberto Breppe	Argentina	DNF
—	Kensley Reece	Barbados	DNF
—	Hector Edwards	Barbados	DNF
—	Orlando Bates	Barbados	DNF
—	Frans Van Looy	Belgium	DNF
—	Luiz Carlos Flores	Brazil	DNF
—	Miguel Silva Júnior	Brazil	DNF
—	Lindsay Gauld	Canada	DNF
—	Joseph Evouna	Cameroon	DNF
—	Joseph Kono	Cameroon	DNF
—	Nicolas Owona	Cameroon	DNF
—	Jean Bernard Djambou	Cameroon	DNF
—	Shue Ming-fa	Republic of China	DNF
—	Fabio Acevedo	Colombia	DNF
—	Raúl Marcelo Vázquez	Cuba	DNF
—	José Prieto	Cuba	DNF
—	Pedro Rodríguez	Cuba	DNF
—	Alois Holík	Czechoslovakia	DNF
—	Eigil Sørensen	Denmark	DNF
—	Fisihasion Ghebreyesus	Ethiopia	DNF
—	Rissom Gebre Meskei	Ethiopia	DNF
—	Suleman Abdul Rahman	Ethiopia	DNF
—	Ole Wackström	Finland	DNF
—	Mauno Uusivirta	Finland	DNF
—	Harry Hannus	Finland	DNF
—	Tapani Vuorenhela	Finland	DNF
—	Raymond Martin	France	DNF
—	Dieter Gonschorek	East Germany	DNF
—	Wolfram Kühn	East Germany	DNF
—	David Lloyd	Great Britain	DNF
—	John Clewarth	Great Britain	DNF
—	József Peterman	Hungary	DNF
—	Noel Teggart	Ireland	DNF
—	Aldo Parecchini	Italy	DNF
—	Franco Ongarato	Italy	DNF
—	Howard Fenton	Jamaica	DNF
—	Michael Lecky	Jamaica	DNF
—	Radcliffe Lawrence	Jamaica	DNF
—	Xavier Mirander	Jamaica	DNF
—	Tarek Abou Al Dahab	Lebanon	DNF
—	Paul Kind	Liechtenstein	DNF
—	Grimon Langson	Malawi	DNF
—	Raphael Kazembe	Malawi	DNF
—	Abdul Bahar-ud-Din Rahum	Malaysia	DNF
—	Daud Ibrahim	Malaysia	DNF
—	Omar Haji Saad	Malaysia	DNF
—	Saad Fadzil	Malaysia	DNF
—	Agustín Alcántara	Mexico	DNF
—	Francisco Vázquez	Mexico	DNF
—	Francisco Huerta	Mexico	DNF
—	Robert Oliver	New Zealand	DNF
—	Vern Hanaray	Malaysia	NZL
—	Arve Haugen	Norway	DNF
—	Jan Henriksen	Norway	DNF
—	Carlos Espinoza	Peru	DNF
—	Enrique Allyón	Peru	DNF
—	Fernando Cuenca	Peru	DNF
—	Gilberto Chocce	Peru	DNF
—	Maximo Junta	Philippines	DNF
—	Jan Smyrak	Poland	DNF
—	Daniele Cesaretti	San Marino	DNF
—	Valery Yardy	Soviet Union	DNF
—	Ivan Trifonov	Soviet Union	DNF
—	Leif Hansson	Sweden	DNF
—	Bernt Johansson	Sweden	DNF
—	Hugo Schär	Switzerland	DNF
—	Panya Singprayool-Dinmuong	Thailand	DNF
—	Pramote Sangskulrote	Thailand	DNF
—	Sataporn Kantasa-Ard	Thailand	DNF
—	Sivaporn Ratanapool	Thailand	DNF
—	Charles Leodo	Togo	DNF
—	Gbedikpe Emmanuel Amouzou	Togo	DNF
—	Tompson Mensah	Togo	DNF
—	Anthony Sellier	Trinidad and Tobago	DNF
—	Clive Saney	Trinidad and Tobago	DNF
—	Patrick Gellineau	Trinidad and Tobago	DNF
—	Vernon Stauble	Trinidad and Tobago	DNF
—	Haluk Günözgen	Turkey	DNF
—	Mevlüt Bora	Turkey	DNF
—	Rıfat Çalışkan	Turkey	DNF
—	Alberto Rodríguez	Uruguay	DNF
—	Emile Waldteufel	United States	DNF
—	Robert Schneider	United States	DNF
—	Jorge Jukich	Uruguay	DNF
—	Mario Margalef	Uruguay	DNF
—	Eugen Pleško	Yugoslavia	DNF
—	Janez Zakotnik	Yugoslavia	DNF
