= Cycling at the 1972 Summer Olympics – Men's team time trial =

Men's cycling team time trial at the Games of the XX Olympiad
- Venue: Munich, West Germany; 100.00 km (62.1 mi)
- Date: 29 August 1972
- Competitors: 140 from 35 nations
- Winning time: 2:11:17.8

Medalists
1st place, gold medalist(s)		Boris Shukhov, Valery Yardy, Gennady Komnatov, Valery Likhachov	Soviet Union
2nd place, silver medalist(s)		Lucjan Lis, Edward Barcik, Stanisław Szozda, Ryszard Szurkowski	Poland
3rd place, bronze medalist(s)		not awarded	

These are the official results of the Men's Team Time Trial at the 1972 Summer Olympics in Munich, West Germany, held on 29 August 1972. There were 140 participants from 35 nations. No bronze medal was awarded, as the Netherlands were disqualified when Aad van den Hoek tested positive for coramine. The fourth-placed Belgian team were not awarded the bronze medal because they had not been tested for drugs.

== Final classification ==
Rank	Name	Nationality	Time
1st place, gold medalist(s)	Boris Shukhov; Valery Yardy; Gennady Komnatov; Valery Likhachov	Soviet Union	2:11:17.8
2nd place, silver medalist(s)	Lucjan Lis; Edward Barcik; Stanisław Szozda; Ryszard Szurkowski	Poland	2:11:47.5
DQ	Fedor den Hertog; Hennie Kuiper; Cees Priem; Aad van den Hoek	Netherlands	2:12:27.1
4	Ludo Delcroix; Gustaaf Hermans; Gustaaf Van Cauter; Louis Verreydt	Belgium	2:12:36.7
5	Thorleif Andresen; Arve Haugen; Knut Knudsen; Magne Orre	Norway	2:13:20.7
6	Lennart Fagerlund; Tord Filipsson; Leif Hansson; Sven-Åke Nilsson	Sweden	2:13:36.9
7	Tibor Debreceni; Imre Géra; József Peterman; András Takács	Hungary	2:14:18.8
8	Gilbert Bischoff; Bruno Hubschmid; Roland Schär; Ueli Sutter	Switzerland	2:14:33.6
9	Osvaldo Castellan; Pasqualino Moretti; Francesco Moser; Giovanni Tonoli	Italy	2:14:36.2
10	Sigi Denk; Roman Humenberger; Rudolf Mitteregger; Johann Summer	Austria	2:14:48.5
11	Jørgen Emil Hansen; Junker Jørgensen; Jørn Lund; Jørgen Marcussen	Denmark	2:15:25.1
12	Jaime Huélamo; Carlos Melero; José Teña; José Viejo	Spain	2:15:37.7
13	Miloš Hrazdíra; Jiří Mainuš; Petr Matoušek; Vlastimil Moravec	Czechoslovakia	2:16:15.4
14	Phil Bayton; John Clewarth; Phil Edwards; Dave Lloyd	Great Britain	2:16:18.0
15	Richard Ball; John Howard; Ron Skarin; Wayne Stetina	United States	2:17:06.4
16	Gregorio Aldo Arencibia; Roberto Menéndez; Pedro Rodríguez; Raúl Marcelo Vázquez	Cuba	2:17:24.5
17	Donald Allan; Graeme Jose; Clyde Sefton; John Trevorrow	Australia	2:18:00.4
18	Henri Fin; Claude Magni; Jean-Claude Meunier; Guy Sibille	France	2:18:19.3
19	Kalevi Eskelinen; Harry Hannus; Mauno Uusivirta; Ole Wackström	Finland	2:18:25.2
20	Johannes Knab; Algis Oleknavicius; Rainer Podlesch; Erwin Tischler	West Germany	2:18:27.8
21	Cvitko Bilić; Radoš Čubrić; Jože Valenčič; Janez Zakotnik	Yugoslavia	2:18:28.0
22	Fabio Acevedo; Fernando Cruz; Henry Cuevas; Miguel Samacá	Colombia	2:18:36.9
23	Gilles Durand; Brian Chewter; Jack McCullough; Tom Morris	Canada	2:19:39.2
24	Mevlüt Bora; Erol Küçükbakırcı; Ali Hüryılmaz; Seyit Kırmızı	Turkey	2:19:56.6
25	Agustín Alcántara; Antonio Hernández; Francisco Huerta; Francisco Vázquez	Mexico	2:21:12.0
26	Liam Horner; Peter Doyle; Kieron McQuaid; Noel Teggart	Ireland	2:21:37.8
27	Jorge Jukich; Lino Benech; Alberto Rodríguez; Walter Tardáguila	Uruguay	2:21:57.7
28	Mehari Okubamicael; Rissom Gebre Meskei; Fisihasion Ghebreyesus; Tekeste Woldu	Ethiopia	2:28:39.3
29	Patrick Gellineau; Clive Saney; Anthony Sellier; Vernon Stauble	Trinidad and Tobago	2:29:15.2
30	Bernardo Arias; Gilberto Chocce; Fernando Cuenca; Carlos Espinoza	Peru	2:30:57.5
31	Alfred Tonna; Louis Bezzina; Joseph Said; John Magri	Malta	2:31:40.1
32	Khosro Haghgosha; Mohamed Khodavand; Gholam Hossein Koohi; Behrouz Rahbar	Iran	2:34:30.7
33	Jean Bernard Djambou; Joseph Evouna; Joseph Kono; Nicolas Owona	Cameroon	2:40:10.3
34	Sataporn Kantasa-Ard; Pinit Koeykorpkeo; Sivaporn Ratanapool; Panya Singprayool-Dinmuong	Thailand	2:41:42.0
35	Abdul Bahar-ud-Din Rahum; Daud Ibrahim; Saad Fadzil; Omar Haji Saad	Malaysia	2:46:51.6
