= Peru at the 1972 Summer Olympics =

- IOC code: PER
- NOC: Peruvian Olympic Committee

in Munich
- Competitors: 20 (17 men and 3 women) in 7 sports
- Flag bearer: Enrique Barúa
- Medals: Gold 0 Silver 0 Bronze 0 Total 0

Summer Olympics appearances (overview)
- 1900; 1904–1932; 1936; 1948; 1952; 1956; 1960; 1964; 1968; 1972; 1976; 1980; 1984; 1988; 1992; 1996; 2000; 2004; 2008; 2012; 2016; 2020; 2024; 2028

Peru competed at the 1972 Summer Olympics in Munich, West Germany. 20 competitors, 17 men and 3 women, took part in 25 events in 7 sports.

== Athletics ==
Track Events

Men

Athlete	Events	Heat		Quarterfinal		Semifinal		Final	Rank
Athlete	Events	Result	Rank	Result	Rank	Result	Rank	Result	Rank
Fernando Acevedo	Men's 400 metres	45.80	3	did not advance					

Women

Athlete	Events	Heat		Quarterfinal		Semifinal		Final	Rank
Athlete	Events	Result	Rank	Result	Rank	Result	Rank	Result	Rank
María Luisa Vilca	Women's 100 metres	11.85	6	did not advance					
María Luisa Vilca	Women's 200 metres	24.46	5	24.48	7	did not advance			

Field Events

Women's pentathlon

Athlete	Event	100H	HJ	SP	200 m	LJ	Final	Rank
Edith Noeding	Result	14.24	1.55	10.43	24.41	5.25	3870	24
Edith Noeding	Points	836	781	618	899	736	3870	24

== Boxing ==
Athlete	Event	First round	Second round	Third round	Quarterfinals	Semifinals	Final
Athlete	Event	Opposition Result	Opposition Result	Opposition Result	Opposition Result	Opposition Result	Rank
Carlos Burga	Welterweight	Hodne (NOR); W 4–1	Valdez (USA); L 1–4	did not advance			17
Oscar Ludeña	Heavyweight	BYE	Hussing (FRG); L KO	did not advance			5

== Cycling ==
=== Road ===
Team

Rider	Event	Time	Rank
Bernardo Arias; Gilberto Chocce; Fernando Cuenca; Carlos Espinoza	Team time trial	2-30:57.5	30

Individual

Rider	Event	Time	Rank
Enrique Allyón	Road race	DNF	
Gilberto Chocce	Road race	DNF	
Fernando Cuenca	Road race	DNF	
Carlos Espinoza	Road race	DNF	

== Fencing ==
One fencer represented Peru in 1972. The tournament was played by pools where everyone faced everyone on the group and the top fencers moved on to the next round.

Pool Seven	Pld	BW	BL	GF	GA
Tibor Pézsa (HUN)	5	5	0	25	11
Eddy Ham (NED)	5	3	2	22	13
Bernard Vallée (FRA)	5	3	2	19	12
Anani Mikhaylov (BUL)	5	3	2	19	16
Enrique Barúa (PER)	5	1	4	9	24
Bob Foxcroft (CAN)	5	0	5	7	25

Athlete	Event	Round 1	
Athlete	Event	Opposition Score	Rank
Enrique Barúa	Men's sabre		
Enrique Barúa	Men's sabre	Pézsa (HUN); L 2–5	5
Enrique Barúa	Men's sabre	Ham (NED); L 0–5	5
Enrique Barúa	Men's sabre	Vallée (FRA); L 0–5	5
Enrique Barúa	Men's sabre	Mikhaylov (BUL); L 2–5	5
Enrique Barúa	Men's sabre	Foxcroft (CAN); W 5–4	5

== Shooting ==
Two shooters, one man and one woman, represented Peru in 1972.

50 m rifle, prone

- Gladys Baldwin

Trap

- Juan Jorge Giha Sr.

== Swimming ==
Men

Athlete	Event	Heat		Semifinal		Final	
Athlete	Event	Time	Rank	Time	Rank	Time	Rank
Juan Carlos Bello	100 m freestyle	No Show					
Juan Carlos Bello	200 m freestyle	No Show					
Juan Carlos Bello	100 m butterfly	57.54	3 Q	57.51	5	did not advance	
Juan Carlos Bello	200 m individual medley	2:11.70	2 Q	—N/a		2:11.87	7
Guillermo Pacheco	400 m freestyle	4:18.78	7	—N/a		did not advance	
Guillermo Pacheco	1500 m freestyle	17:36.36	7	—N/a		did not advance	
Alfredo Hunger	100 m breaststroke	1:11.44	6	did not advance			
Alfredo Hunger	200 m breaststroke	2:37.20	7	—N/a		did not advance	
