= Trofeo Papà Cervi =

Annual cycling race in Italy

Race details
- Date: May 1
- Region: Province of Reggio Emilia
- Discipline: Road race
- Competition: UCI Europe Tour (2012); National
- Type: Single day race

History
- First edition: 1971
- Editions: 49 (as of 2019)
- First winner: Marcello Osler (ITA)
- Most wins: Guido Bontempi (ITA); Giovanni Lombardi (ITA) (2 wins)
- Most recent: Filippo Tagliani (ITA)

The Trofeo Papà Cervi is a one-day road cycling race held annually in Italy. It was part of UCI Europe Tour in 2012 as a category 1.2 event.

== Winners ==
Year	Winner	Second	Third
1971	(Italy) Marcello Osler	(Italy) Euro Camporesi	(Italy) Riccardo Beloli
1972	(Italy) Giuliano Dominoni	(Italy) Agostino Bertagnoli	(Italy) Mirco Bernardi
1973	(Italy) Pietro Algeri	(Italy) Mario Boglia	(East Germany) Horst Wagner
1974	(Italy) Fausto Ruggenini	(Italy) Osvaldo Bettoni	(Cuba) Carlos Cardet
1975	(Poland) Wojciech Matusiak	(Soviet Union) Lev Likhachev	(Czechoslovakia) Rudolf Labus
1976	(Soviet Union) Valery Likhachov	(Italy) Claudio Torelli	(Czechoslovakia) Jiří Prchal
1977	(Italy) Claudio Torelli	(Italy) Piero Falorni	(Italy) Massimo Manzotti
1978	(Italy) Silvano Riccò	(Italy) Daniele Folloni	(Italy) Mirko Bernardi
1979	(Italy) Guido Bontempi	(Soviet Union) Sergei Kopyrin	(Italy) Luigi Trevellin
1980	(Italy) Guido Bontempi	(Italy) Agostino Gambirasio	(Italy) Flavio Zappis
1981	(Italy) Carlo Bertaboni	(Italy) Jozep Madis	(Italy) Ercole Borgini
1982	(Soviet Union) Pavel Moucitsky	(Italy) Angelo Scandiuzzi	(Italy) Ezio Pavesi
1983	(Italy) Maurizio Rossi	(Italy) Maurizio Conti	(Italy) Alberto Molinari
1984	(Soviet Union) Vladimir Malakhov	(Italy) Oreste Gualazzini	(Italy) Eros Poli
1985	(Soviet Union) Gennady Tarasov	(Italy) Adriano Gemelli	(Italy) Carlo Bertaboni
1986	(Italy) Walter Brugna	(Italy) Flavio Zanini	(Italy) Andrea Govoni
1987	(Italy) Riccardo Conti	(Italy) Alberto Destro	(Italy) Giovanni Fidanza
1988	(Italy) Adriano Lorenzi	(Italy) Giampaolo Miodini	(Italy) Stefano Breme
1989	(Soviet Union) Djamolidine Abdoujaparov	(Italy) Giovanni Lombardi	(Italy) Walter Brambilla
1990	(Italy) Roberto Maggioni	(Italy) Claudio Camin	(Italy) Fausto Bignami
1991	(Italy) Giovanni Lombardi	(Italy) Alberto Destro	(Italy) Andrea Collinelli
1992	(Italy) Giovanni Lombardi	(Italy) Alberto Destro	(Italy) Walter Castignola
1993	(Italy) Maurizio Radaelli	(Italy) Stefano Faustini	(Italy) Luca Colombo
1994	(Italy) Biagio Conte	(Italy) Mirko Rossato	(Italy) Damiano Masiero
1995	(Italy) Marino Beggi	(Italy) Salvatore Commesso	(Italy) Alessandro Guerra
1996	(Italy) Ellis Rastelli	(Italy) Luca Cassiani	(Italy) Simone Simonetti
1997	(Italy) Mauro Zinetti	(Italy) Leonardo Scarselli	(Slovenia) Martin Derganc
1998	(Italy) Denis Bertolini	(Italy) Nicola Gavazzi	(Italy) Giosuè Bonomi
1999	(Italy) Mauro Furlan	(Italy) Nicola Pavone	(Italy) Francesco Bellotti
2000	(Italy) Marco Gelain	(Italy) Devid Garbelli	(Italy) Claudio Pizzoferrato
2001	(Italy) Alessandro Maserati	(Australia) Caleb Manion	(Italy) Luca De Carolis
2002	(Russia) Vladimir Lobzov	(Italy) Mattia Parravicini	(Australia) Jonathan Davis
2003	(Italy) Danilo Napolitano	(Italy) Mirco Lorenzetto	(Italy) Enrico Grigoli
2004	(Italy) Mattia Gavazzi	(Italy) Danilo Napolitano	(Italy) Fabio Masotti
2005	(Italy) Tiziano Dall'Antonia	(Italy) Erik Solavaggione	(Italy) Manuel Donte
2006	(Italy) Antonio Bucciero	(Moldova) Alexandre Sabalin	(Poland) Adam Pierzga
2007	(Italy) Bernardo Riccio	(Italy) Michele Merlo	(Italy) Ramon Baldoni
2008	(Italy) Michele Merlo	(Italy) Andrea Guardini	(Italy) Matteo Busato
2009	(Italy) Giacomo Nizzolo	(Brazil) Rafael Andriato	(Italy) Andrea Palini
2010	(Italy) Matteo Pelucchi	(Italy) Tomas Alberio	(Italy) Nicola Ruffoni
2011	No race		
2012	(Italy) Giorgio Bocchiola	(Brazil) Carlos Manarelli	(Italy) Matteo Azzolini
2013	No race		
2014	(Italy) Luca Regalli	(Italy) Matteo Donegà	(China) Zhang Yong Jive
2015	(Italy) Pasquale Repino	(Italy) Gianluca Esposito	(Italy) Manuel Barbieri
2016	(Italy) Gianluca Esposito	(Italy) Gabriele Petrelli	(Italy) Nicolò Codeluppi
2017	(Italy) Moreno Marchetti	(Italy) Simone Bevilacqua	(Albania) Xhuliano Kamberaj
2018	(Italy) Leonardo Fedrigo	(Italy) Giovanni Lonardi	(Italy) Enrico Zanoncello
2019	(Italy) Filippo Tagliani	(Italy) Tommaso Fiaschi	(Italy) Attilio Viviani
