= John Magri =

Personal information
- Born: 7 April 1941 (age 85)

Cycling career
- Sport: Cycling

John Magri (born 7 April 1941) is a Maltese cyclist. Magri participated at the 1972 Summer Olympics with Louis Bezzina, Joseph Said, and Alfred Tonna in the Men's 100 km Team Road Race. The team finished in 31st place. He also participated in the Mediterranean Games and several tours abroad as a cyclist, coach, or as a mechanic.

He is the President of Mosta Cycling Club and his son Paul is the owner of the biggest bike shop in Malta. Magri is a noted name in Malta's cycling community. He won several local championships; been a trainer/coach of the national team for several years; won Sportsman of the Year (organized by the national sports organization); and won a similar award from the sports writers organization.
