= Thailand at the 1972 Summer Olympics =

- IOC code: THA
- NOC: National Olympic Committee of Thailand

in Munich
- Competitors: 33 in 7 sports
- Flag bearer: Rangsit Yanothai
- Medals: Gold 0 Silver 0 Bronze 0 Total 0

Summer Olympics appearances (overview)
- 1952; 1956; 1960; 1964; 1968; 1972; 1976; 1980; 1984; 1988; 1992; 1996; 2000; 2004; 2008; 2012; 2016; 2020; 2024

Thailand competed at the 1972 Summer Olympics in Munich, West Germany. Thirty-three competitors, all men, took part in 21 events in seven sports.

== Athletics ==
Men's 100 metres

- Anat Ratanapol

- First Heat – DNS (→ did not advance)

Men's 4 × 100 m Relay

- Boontud Jeanl, Surapong Ariyamongkol, Panus Ariyamongkol, and Anat Ratanapol

- Heat – 41.04s (→ did not advance)

== Boxing ==
Men's Light Flyweight (– 48 kg)

- Sripirom Surapong

- First Round – Lost to György Gedo (HUN), TKO-3

== Cycling ==
Seven cyclists represented Thailand in 1972.

Individual road race

- Sataporn Kantasa-Ard – did not finish (→ no ranking)
- Sivaporn Ratanapool – did not finish (→ no ranking)
- Pramote Sangskulrote – did not finish (→ no ranking)
- Panya Singprayool-Dinmuong – did not finish (→ no ranking)

Team time trial

- Sataporn Kantasa-Ard
- Pinit Koeykorpkeo
- Sivaporn Ratanapool
- Panya Singprayool-Dinmuong

Sprint

- Taworn Tarwan
- Suriya Chiarasapawong

1000m time trial

- Suriya Chiarasapawong

- Final – 1:12.53 (→ 25th place)

== Shooting ==
Ten male shooters represented Thailand in 1972.

25 m pistol

- Solos Nalampoon
- Rangsit Yanothai

50 m pistol

- Sutham Aswanit
- Samak Chainares

50 m rifle, three positions

- Chawalit Kamutchati
- Preeda Phengdisth

50 m rifle, prone

- Udomsak Theinthong
- Chira Prabandhayodhin

Trap

- Damrong Pachonyut
- Boonkua Lourvanij
