= Gąsiorek =

Gąsiorek is a Polish surname. It has several phonetic respellings: Gonsiorek, Gonschorek, and Gonshorek. Notable people with the surname, or one of its variants, include:

- Wiesław Gąsiorek (1936–2002), Polish tennis player
- Dieter Gonschorek (born 1944), East German cyclist

== See also ==
- Gąsior (surname)
