= Shooting at the 1968 Summer Olympics – Mixed 300 metre free rifle, three positions =

Shooting sport at the Olympics

Mixed 300 metre free rifle, three positions at the Games of the XIX Olympiad
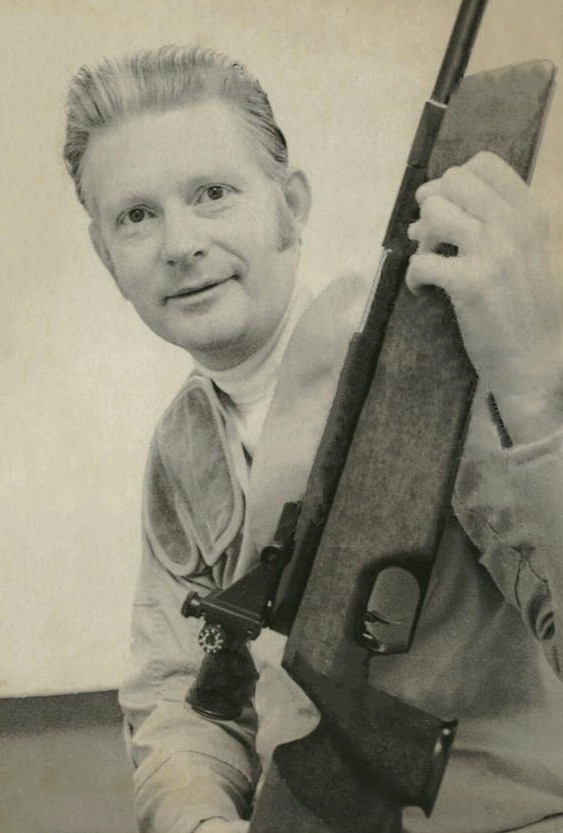
- Gary Anderson (1976)
- Venue: Vicente Suárez Shooting Range
- Date: 23 October 1968
- Competitors: 30 from 16 nations
- Winning score: 1157 WR

Medalists
1st place, gold medalist(s)		Gary Anderson; United States
2nd place, silver medalist(s)		Valentin Kornev; Soviet Union
3rd place, bronze medalist(s)		Kurt Müller; Switzerland

The mixed 300 m rifle three positions was a shooting sports event held as part of the Shooting at the 1968 Summer Olympics programme. It was the 10th appearance of the event at an Olympic Games. The competition was held on 23 October 1968, with 30 shooters from 16 nations competing. Nations had been limited to two shooters each since the 1952 Games. The event was won by Gary Anderson of the United States, the only person to successfully defend an Olympic title in the event (and one of only three to win multiple medals of any color). It was the United States' third gold medal in the event, most of any nation. Valentin Kornev extended the Soviet Union's podium streak in the event to five Games with his silver. Swiss shooter Kurt Müller took bronze.

As with all shooting events in 1968, the event was open to women for the first time. Though the event switched from men's to (formally) mixed, it is generally considered the same event—for example, the Official Report writes that Anderson successfully defended his title. While women did compete in shooting in 1968, none competed in this event.

== Background ==
This was the 10th appearance of the 300 metre three-positions rifle event, which was held 11 times between 1900 and 1972. Three of the top 10 shooters from 1964 returned: gold medalist Gary Anderson of the United States, silver medalist Shota Kveliashvili of the Soviet Union, and seventh-place finisher Kurt Müller of Switzerland. Anderson had won the last two world championships (1962 and 1966) and set the world record as well the Tokyo 1964 Olympic gold.

East Germany made its separate debut in the event. Finland, Sweden, and the United States each made their ninth appearance, tied for most of all nations.

== Competition format ==
The competition had each shooter fire 120 shots, 40 shots in each position. Shots were fired in series of 10. The target was 1 metre in diameter, with 10 scoring rings; targets were set at a distance of 300 metres. Thus, the maximum score possible was 1200 points. Any rifle could be used.

== Records ==
Prior to the competition, the existing world and Olympic records were as follows.

World record	Gary Anderson (USA)	1156	Wiesbaden, West Germany	1966
Olympic record	Gary Anderson (USA)	1153	Tokyo, Japan	15 October 1964

Gary Anderson broke his own world record with 1157 to repeat as Olympic champion.

== Schedule ==
All times are Central Standard Time (UTC-6)

Date	Time	Round
Wednesday, 23 October 1968		Final

== Results ==
Rank	Shooter	Nation	Score				Notes
Rank	Shooter	Nation	Prone	Kneeling	Standing	Total	Notes
1st place, gold medalist(s)	Gary Anderson	United States	394	389	374	1157	WR
2nd place, silver medalist(s)	Valentin Kornev	Soviet Union	398	384	369	1151	
3rd place, bronze medalist(s)	Kurt Müller	Switzerland	395	379	374	1148	
4	Shota Kveliashvili	Soviet Union	394	383	365	1142	
5	Erwin Vogt	Switzerland	398	384	358	1140	
6	Hartmut Sommer	East Germany	389	384	367	1140	
7	John Foster	United States	386	386	368	1140	
8	Petre Șandor	Romania	394	376	368	1138	
9	Elling Øvergård	Norway	397	382	356	1135	
10	Lajos Papp	Hungary	391	385	359	1135	
11	Juhani Laakso	Finland	382	386	367	1135	
12	Jan Kůrka	Czechoslovakia	391	380	362	1133	
13	Sven Johansson	Sweden	393	386	350	1129	
14	Bjørn Bakken	Norway	392	380	357	1129	
15	Ryszard Fandier	Poland	389	381	357	1127	
16	Ferenc Petrovácz	Hungary	390	379	357	1126	
17	Kurt Johansson	Sweden	395	385	345	1125	
18	Ondrej Šima	Czechoslovakia	391	378	352	1121	
19	Osmo Ala-Honkola	Finland	391	384	345	1120	
20	Eugeniusz Pędzisz	Poland	385	376	356	1117	
21	Olegario Vázquez	Mexico	389	365	356	1110	
22	Adolfo Feliciano	Philippines	378	371	359	1108	
23	Uto Wunderlich	East Germany	377	374	356	1107	
24	Ștefan Kaban	Romania	392	367	343	1102	
25	José González	Mexico	370	366	356	1092	
26	Wu Tao-yan	Taiwan	378	369	338	1085	
27	Yondonjamtsyn Batsükh	Mongolia	390	364	328	1082	
28	Bernardo San Juan	Philippines	379	349	332	1060	
29	José Marroquín	Guatemala	380	333	314	1027	
30	Félipe Ortiz	Guatemala	377	343	303	1023	
