= José Tena =

José Tena may refer to:

- José Tena (baseball), born 2001, Dominican baseball player for the Cleveland Guardians
- José Tena (cyclist), born 1951, Spanish cyclist who competed in the 1972 Summer Olympics
