= THPC =

THPC may refer to:

- Tetrakis(hydroxymethyl)phosphonium chloride (THPC), an organophosphorus compound with industrial applications
- THPC (drug) (1-methyl-1,2,5,6-tetrahydropyridine-3-diethylcarboxamide), a simplified LSD analogue, serotonin antagonist, and hallucinogen antidote
