= 1970 UCI Road World Championships =

43rd edition of the Road Cycling World championship

- Venue: Leicester, United Kingdom
- Date: 13-16 August 1970
- Coordinates: 52°38′N 1°08′W

The 1970 UCI Road World Championships took place from 13 to 16 August 1970 at Mallory Park in Leicester, United Kingdom.

In the same period, the 1970 UCI Track Cycling World Championships were also organized in Leicester.

== Results ==
Race:	Gold:	Time	Silver:	Time	Bronze :	Time
Men
Men's road race	Jean-Pierre Monseré; Belgium	6 h 33 min 58s	Leif Mortensen; Denmark	+ 2s	Felice Gimondi; Italy	m.t.
Amateurs' road race	Jorgen Schmidt; Denmark	-	Ludo Van der Linden; Belgium	-	Tony Gakens; Belgium	-
Team time trial	Soviet Union; Valery Yardy; Viktor Sokolov; Boris Shoukov; Valeri Likatchev	–	Czechoslovakia; Jiří Mainuš; František Řezáč; Milan Puzrla; Petr Matoušek	–	Netherlands; Fedor den Hertog; Popke Oosterhof; Tino Tabak; Adri Duycker	-
Women
Women's road race	Anna Konkina; Soviet Union	-	Morena Tartagni; Italy	-	Raisa Obodovskaja; Soviet Union	-

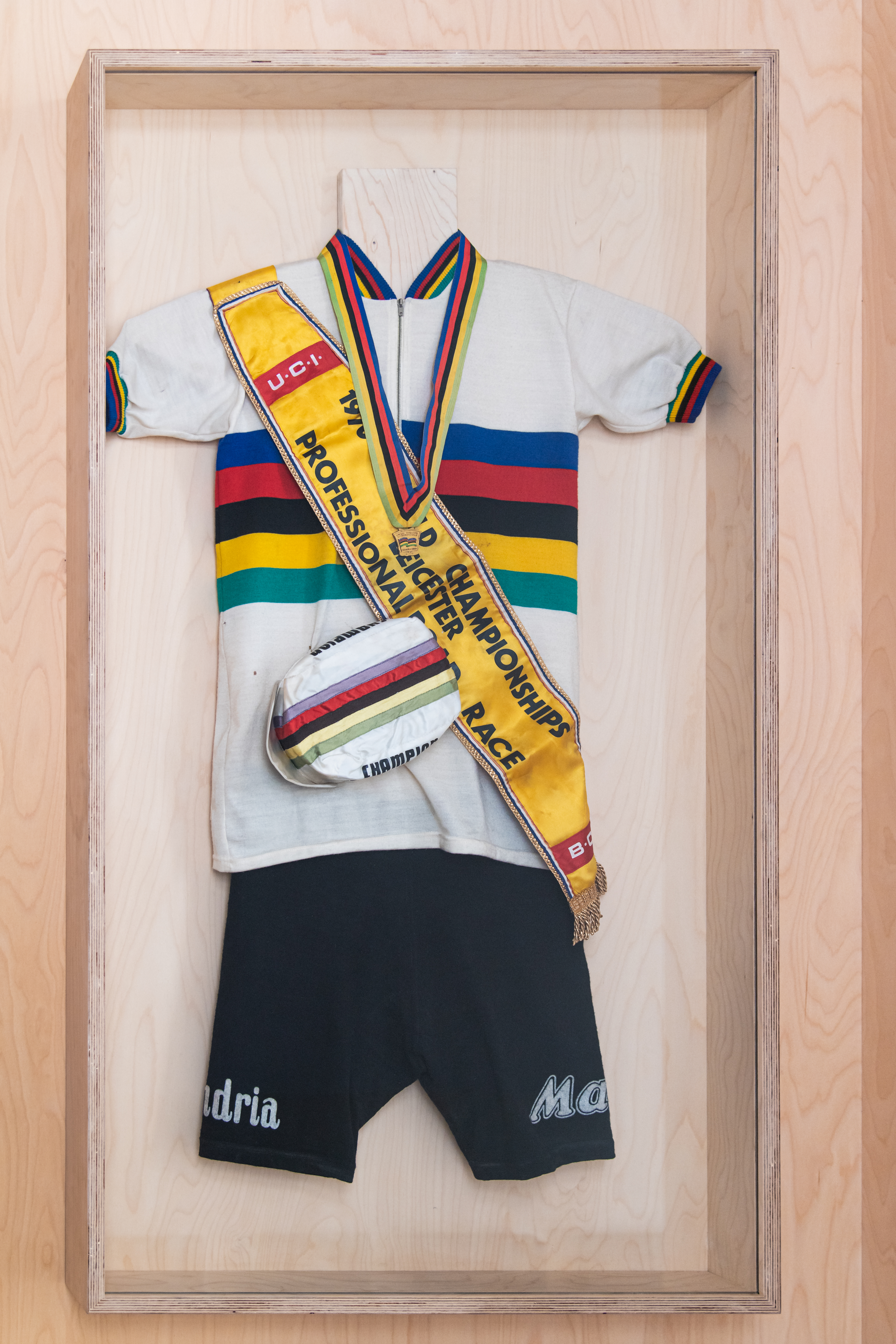
Outfit of Jean-Pierre Monseré as worldchampion, consisting of victory ribbon, cap, medal and rainbow jersey (collection KOERS. Museum of Cycle Racing)

== Medal table ==
Rank	Nation	Gold	Silver	Bronze	Total
1	Soviet Union (URS)	2	0	1	3
2	Belgium (BEL)	1	1	1	3
3	Denmark (DEN)	1	1	0	2
4	Italy (ITA)	0	1	1	2
5	Czechoslovakia (TCH)	0	1	0	1
6	Netherlands (NED)	0	0	1	1
Totals (6 entries)		4	4	4	12
