= Stephen Hart =

Stephen Hart may refer to:

- Stephen Hart (bishop) (1866–1952), Australian Anglican bishop
- Stephen Hart (footballer) (born 1960), Trinidadian association football manager
- Stephen Hart (water polo) (born 1953), Canadian Olympic water polo player
- Stephen R. Hart (born 1958), Canadian actor
- Steve Hart (1859–1880), Australian bushranger
- Steve Hart (singer) (born 1972), lead singer of pop group Worlds Apart
- Stephen Hart, fictional character in the British TV series Primeval, see List of Primeval characters#Stephen Hart
- J. Steven Hart, lobbyist, Williams & Jensen PLLC, and member, Congressional Award Foundation Board of Directors

== See also ==
- Hart (surname)
