= Jack McCullough =

Jack McCullough may refer to:

- Jack McCullough (politician) (1860–1947), New Zealand trade unionist and politician
- Jack McCullough, formerly convicted of the murder of Maria Ridulph, but conviction was later overturned
- Jack McCullough (cyclist) (born 1949), Canadian cyclist
- Jack McCullough (rugby league) (1921–2005), Australian rugby player
