= Bruce Biddle =

New Zealand cyclist

Personal information
- Full name: Bruce William Biddle
- Born: 2 November 1948 (age 78) Warkworth, New Zealand
- Height: 1.73 m (5 ft 8 in)
- Weight: 64 kg (141 lb)

Cycling career
- Sport: Cycling
- Current team: Retired
- Discipline: Road
- Role: Rider

Professional teams
- 1974–1975: Magniflex
- 1976: Cuneo–Bonetto
- 1977: Sanson
- 1978: Gis Gelati
- 1979: Mecap–Selle Italia

Major wins
- One-day races and Classics National Road Race Championships (1969)
Medal record
Men's road bicycle racing
Representing New Zealand
British Commonwealth Games
Gold medal – first place	1970 Edinburgh	Road race

Bruce William Biddle (born 2 November 1948) is a former road racing cyclist from New Zealand, who was a professional rider from 1974 to 1979. He won the gold medal in the men's individual road race at the 1970 British Commonwealth Games in Edinburgh.

== Career ==
Biddle won the gold medal in the men's individual road race at the 1970 Commonwealth Games. This was the first gold medal by a New Zealander in the road race at the Commonwealth Games. Following the race he spent the next season in England.

He represented his native country at the 1972 Summer Olympics in Munich, West Germany, where he came fourth in the men's individual road race. Although Jaime Huelamo from Spain, who came third, was disqualified for failing a drug test, the bronze medal was not awarded to Biddle as he had not been tested for drugs. There was an attempt in 2002 to try to get Biddle his Bronze medal it was not successful. But his first race following the Olympic games, in Tuscany, he was awarded a gold medal.

In 1973 he won the Piccolo Giro di Lombardia, the under-23 version of the UCI WorldTour race Giro di Lombardia.

In 1979 Biddle was run over by a lorry and it look him many months to recover. This crash was one of the reasons he retired from the sport at the end of the year.

== Major results ==
1969
1st Road race, National Road Championships
1st Overall Dulux Tour of the North Island
1970
1st Road race, Commonwealth Games
8th Overall Tour of Ireland

1st Stages 4 & 8

1971
2nd, Stage 11 Milk Race
3rd Overall Tour of Ireland
4th Overall Manx International GP
8th Overall Archer GP
1972
1st GP la Torre
4th Road race, Olympic Games
1973
1st Piccolo Giro di Lombardia
1st Giro delle Valli Aretine
2nd Coppa Bologna
9th Gran Premio della Liberazione
1974
3rd Giro del Lazio
1975
7th GP Benego
9th Gran Premio Industria e Commercio di Prato
1976
5th Trofeo Laigueglia
7th Giro della Provincia di Reggio Calabria
8th Giro della Romagna
8th GP Montelupo
8th Trofeo Baracchi
2nd, Stage 7 Tour de Suisse, Lausanne
2nd, Stage 8 Tour de Suisse, Solothurn
3rd, Stage 5 part b Tirreno - Adriatico
1978
10th Gran Premio Industria e Commercio di Prato
