= José Marroquín =

José Marroquín may refer to:

- José Marroquín Leal (1933–1998), Mexican actor,
- José Marroquín (sport shooter) (born 1943), Guatemalan sports shooter
- José Manuel Marroquín (1827–1908), president of Colombia
