= Nikethamide =

Chemical compound

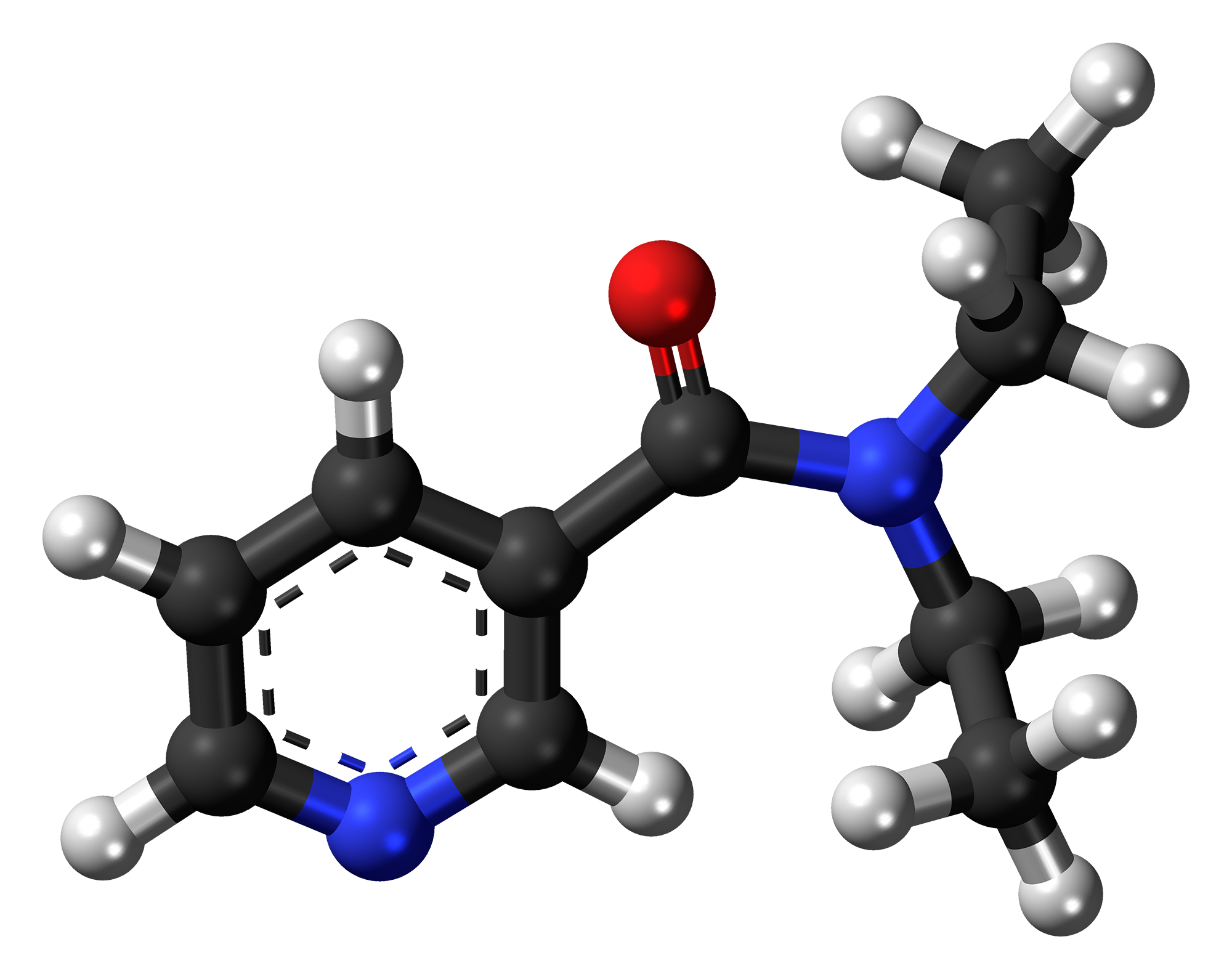

Clinical data
- Trade names: Coramine
- Other names: Nicotinic acid diethylamide
- AHFS/Drugs.com: International Drug Names
- ATC code: R07AB02 (WHO)

Pharmacokinetic data
- Elimination half-life: 0.5 h

Identifiers
- IUPAC name: N,N-Diethyl-3-pyridinecarboxamide
- CAS Number: 59-26-7
- PubChem CID: 5497
- DrugBank: DB13655
- ChemSpider: 5296
- UNII: 368IVD6M32
- KEGG: D07408
- ChEBI: CHEBI:134814
- ChEMBL: ChEMBL2104607
- CompTox Dashboard (EPA): DTXSID9046524
- ECHA InfoCard: 100.000.380

Chemical and physical data
- Formula: C_{10}H_{14}N_{2}O
- Molar mass: 178.235 g·mol^{−1}
- 3D model (JSmol): Interactive image
- SMILES: O=C(N(CC)CC)c1cccnc1
- InChI: InChI=1S/C10H14N2O/c1-3-12(4-2)10(13)9-6-5-7-11-8-9/h5-8H,3-4H2,1-2H3; Key:NCYVXEGFNDZQCU-UHFFFAOYSA-N

Nikethamide is a stimulant which mainly affects the respiratory cycle. Widely known by its former trade name of Coramine, it was used in the mid-twentieth century as a medical countermeasure against tranquilizer overdoses, before the advent of endotracheal intubation and positive-pressure lung expansion. It is no longer commonly considered to be of value for such purposes.

In alternate terminology, it is known as nicotinic acid diethylamide, which meaningfully emphasizes its laboratory origins, and of which its common name is derived as a blend.

== Uses ==
It is useful for mountain climbers to increase endurance at high altitudes.

=== Available forms ===
It is available as a short-acting over-the-counter drug in several South American and European countries, combined with glucose in form of lozenges.

== Contraindications ==
Contraindications include hypertension, cardiovascular disease, and epilepsy.

== Society and culture ==
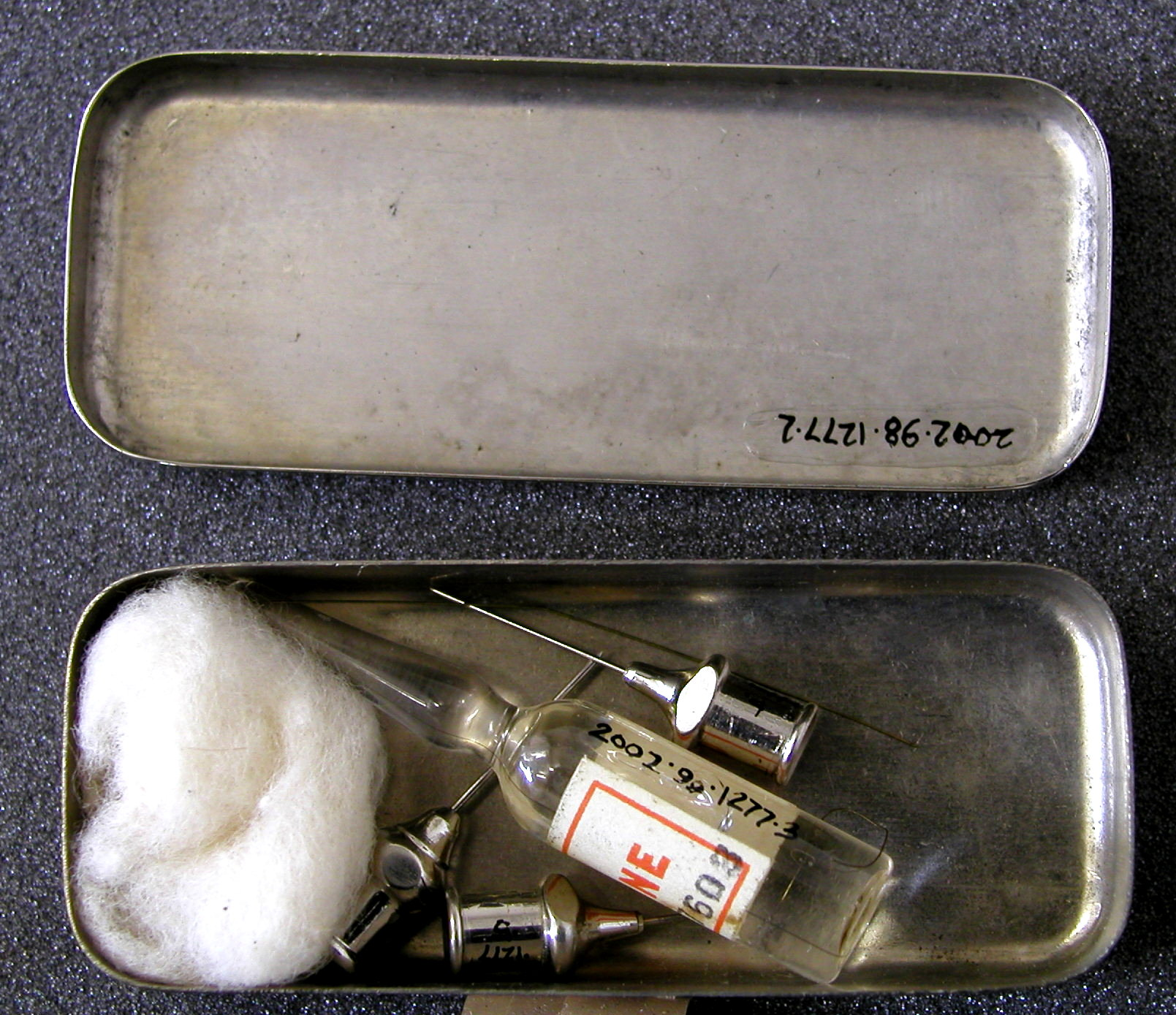
Coramine injection kit from World War II (Auckland War Memorial Museum, New Zealand)

Coramine was used by suspected serial killer John Bodkin Adams when treating patient Gertrude Hullett, whom he was suspected of murdering. However, the toxicity of nikethamide is quite low (LD_{50} rabbits 650 mg/kg oral, LD_{50} rats 240 mg/kg subcutaneous).

Theodor Morell, Adolf Hitler's personal physician, would inject the German ruler with Coramine when Hitler was unduly sedated with barbiturates. In addition, Morell would use Coramine as part of an all-purpose "tonic" for Hitler.

=== Use in sports ===
In some sports, nikethamide is listed by the World Anti-Doping Agency as a banned substance. Jaime Huélamo was stripped of his bronze medal at the 1972 Olympic individual cycling road race after testing positive for Coramine. Croatian tennis player Marin Čilić was suspended from competition for nine months after he tested positive for nikethamide in April 2013. This ban was later reduced to four months after Cilic appealed and claimed he had unintentionally ingested it in a glucose tablet bought at a pharmacy. Polish kart driver Igor Walilko was given a two-year ban, later reduced to eighteen months, from competition in 2010 due to testing positive for nikethamide after a win in Germany in July, 2010.

In July 2021, Swiss athlete and doctor Kariem Hussein was positively tested for nikethamide, which he regularly uses during training. He missed the 2020 Summer Olympics in Tokyo, and was banned from competitions for nine months.

== See also ==
- Nicorandil
- THPC
