= Algis Oleknavicius =

German cyclist

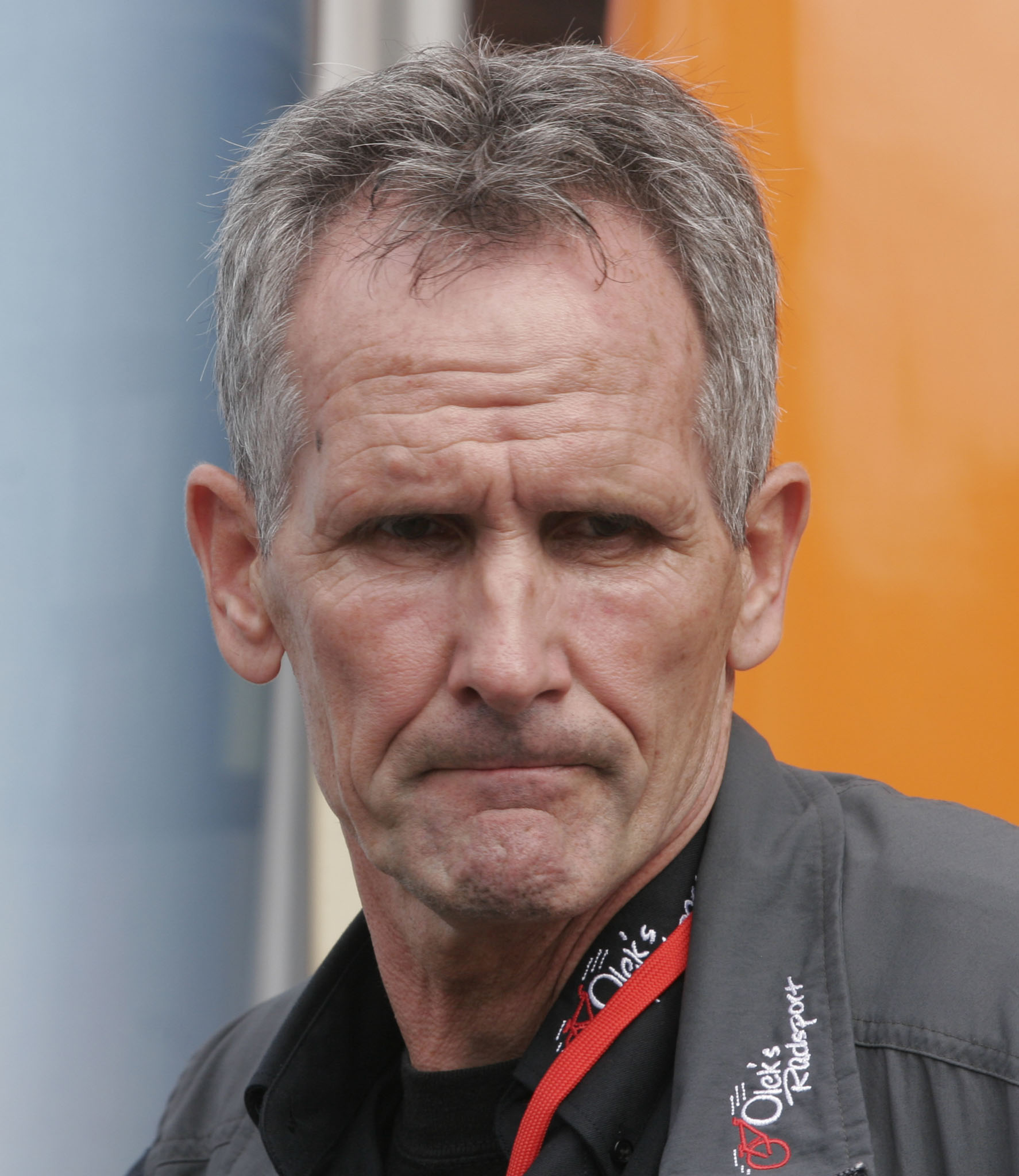

Personal information
- Born: 17 August 1947 (age 79) Kirchheim unter Teck, Germany

Cycling career
- Sport: Cycling

Algis Oleknavicius (born 17 August 1947) is a German former cyclist. He competed for West Germany in the team time trial at the 1972 Summer Olympics.
