= Magne Orre =

Norwegian cyclist (born 1950)

Personal information
- Born: 16 April 1950 (age 76) Notodden, Norway

Cycling career
- Sport: Cycling

Magne Orre (born 16 April 1950) is a Norwegian cyclist. He was born in Notodden. He competed at the 1972 Summer Olympics in Munich, where he placed fifth in the team time trial with the Norwegian team, which consisted of Knut Knudsen, Thorleif Andresen, Arve Haugen and Orre. He also competed in the team time trial at the 1976 Summer Olympics in Montreal, where the Norwegian team placed eighth. He won the Norwegian National Road Race Championship in 1976.
