= Ondrej Šima =

Slovak sports shooter (1936–2023)

Personal information
- Born: 4 August 1936 Malachov, Czechoslovakia
- Died: 12 March 2023 (aged 86) Banská Bystrica, Slovakia

Sport
- Sport: Sports shooting

Ondrej Šima (4 August 1936 – 12 March 2023) was a Slovak sports shooter. He competed in the 300 metre rifle event at the 1968 Summer Olympics.
