= Egzi Gebre-Gebre =

Ethiopian sprinter

Personal information
- Nationality: Ethiopian
- Born: 22 June 1949 (age 77)
- Height: 1.70 m (5 ft 7 in)
- Weight: 63 kg (139 lb)

Sport
- Sport: Sprinting
- Events: 100 metres 4 × 100 metres relay

Egzi Gebre-Gebre (born 22 June 1949) is a former Ethiopian sprinter.

As of 2025, since 6 June 1971, he is still the fastest Ethiopian 100 metres runner ever with a time of 10.1 seconds he set in Addis Ababa. The following year he represented his country at the 1972 Summer Olympics in both the men's 100 metres and men's 4 × 100 metres relay.
