= Luiz Carlos Flores =

Brazilian cyclist (born 1950)

Personal information
- Born: 28 October 1950 (age 75)

Cycling career
- Sport: Cycling

Luiz Carlos Flores (born 28 October 1950) is a Brazilian cyclist. He competed in the individual road race at the 1972 Summer Olympics.
