= Wolfram Kühn (cyclist) =

German cyclist

Personal information
- Born: 30 September 1950 (age 76) Brandenburg, East Germany

Cycling career
- Sport: Cycling

Wolfram Kühn (born 30 September 1950) is a German former cyclist. He competed in the individual road race for East Germany at the 1972 Summer Olympics.
