= Azacyclonol =

Medication which diminishes hallucinations

Clinical data
- Other names: MER-17; MDL-4829; Diphenylmethanolpiperidine
- Routes of administration: Oral
- ATC code: none

Legal status
- Legal status: BR: Class C1 (Other controlled substances); In general: ℞ (Prescription only)

Identifiers
- IUPAC name: Diphenyl(piperidin-4-yl)methanol
- CAS Number: 115-46-8 1798-50-1 (HCl)
- PubChem CID: 15723
- ChemSpider: 14952
- UNII: 2MMR990PEM
- ChEMBL: ChEMBL127508
- CompTox Dashboard (EPA): DTXSID2045280
- ECHA InfoCard: 100.003.720

Chemical and physical data
- Formula: C_{18}H_{21}NO
- Molar mass: 267.372 g·mol^{−1}
- 3D model (JSmol): Interactive image
- SMILES: OC(c1ccccc1)(c2ccccc2)C3CCNCC3
- InChI: InChI=1S/C18H21NO/c20-18(15-7-3-1-4-8-15,16-9-5-2-6-10-16)17-11-13-19-14-12-17/h1-10,17,19-20H,11-14H2; Key:ZMISODWVFHHWNR-UHFFFAOYSA-N

Azacyclonol (trade names Ataractan, Calmeran, Frenoton, Frenquel, Psychosan), also known as γ-pipradrol, is a drug which is an ataractive, i.e., an agent which diminishes hallucinations in psychotic individuals. It has also been called a tranquilizer and antipsychotic, though these definitions are not accurate as it does not actually possess such properties. Despite being a positional isomer of pipradrol, it is not a psychostimulant, and instead has mild depressant effects.

The drug was introduced in Europe in the mid-1950s for the treatment of schizophrenia likely because it was found to attenuate the subjective psychedelic effects of LSD and mescaline in humans. However, due to poor and mixed clinical effectiveness, it never gained widespread acceptance and was eventually discontinued.

Azacyclonol is also known as diphenylmethanolpiperidine and is the parent structure of the antihistamines fexofenadine and terfenadine. Terfenadine produces azacyclonol as a major active metabolite.

It is made by the organometallic addition of 4-bromopyridine to benzophenone, followed by catalytic hydrogenation of the pyridine heteroaromatic ring system to the corresponding piperidine.

== See also ==
- Hallucinogen antidote
- List of investigational antipsychotics
- THPC
