= Henry Cuevas =

Colombian cyclist

Personal information
- Born: 12 October 1954 (age 72)

Cycling career
- Sport: Cycling

Henry Cuevas (born 12 October 1954) is a former Colombian cyclist. He competed in the team time trial at the 1972 Summer Olympics.
