= Noel Teggart =

Irish cyclist

Personal information
- Born: 19 December 1941 Belfast, Northern Ireland
- Died: 6 August 1997 (aged 55) Belfast, Northern Ireland

Cycling career
- Sport: Cycling

Noel Teggart (19 December 1941 – 6 August 1997) was an Irish cyclist. He competed in the individual road race and team time trial events at the 1972 Summer Olympics.
