= Rissom Gebre Meskei =

Ethiopian cyclist

Personal information
- Born: 19 September 1941 (age 85)

Cycling career
- Sport: Cycling

Rissom Gebre Meskei (born 19 September 1941) is a former Ethiopian cyclist. He competed in the individual road race and team time trial events at the 1972 Summer Olympics.
