= Pasqualino Moretti =

Italian cyclist

Personal information
- Born: 14 March 1947 (age 79) Cremona, Italy

Cycling career
- Sport: Cycling

Pasqualino Moretti (born 14 March 1947) is a former Italian cyclist. He competed in the team time trial at the 1972 Summer Olympics.
