= Seyit Kırmızı =

Turkish cyclist

Personal information
- Born: 22 February 1950 (age 76) Konya, Turkey

Cycling career
- Sport: Cycling

Seyit Kırmızı (born 22 February 1950) is a Turkish former cyclist. He competed in the team time trial at the 1972 Summer Olympics.
