= Tour de Bretagne =

French multi-day road cycling race

Tour de Bretagne Cycliste
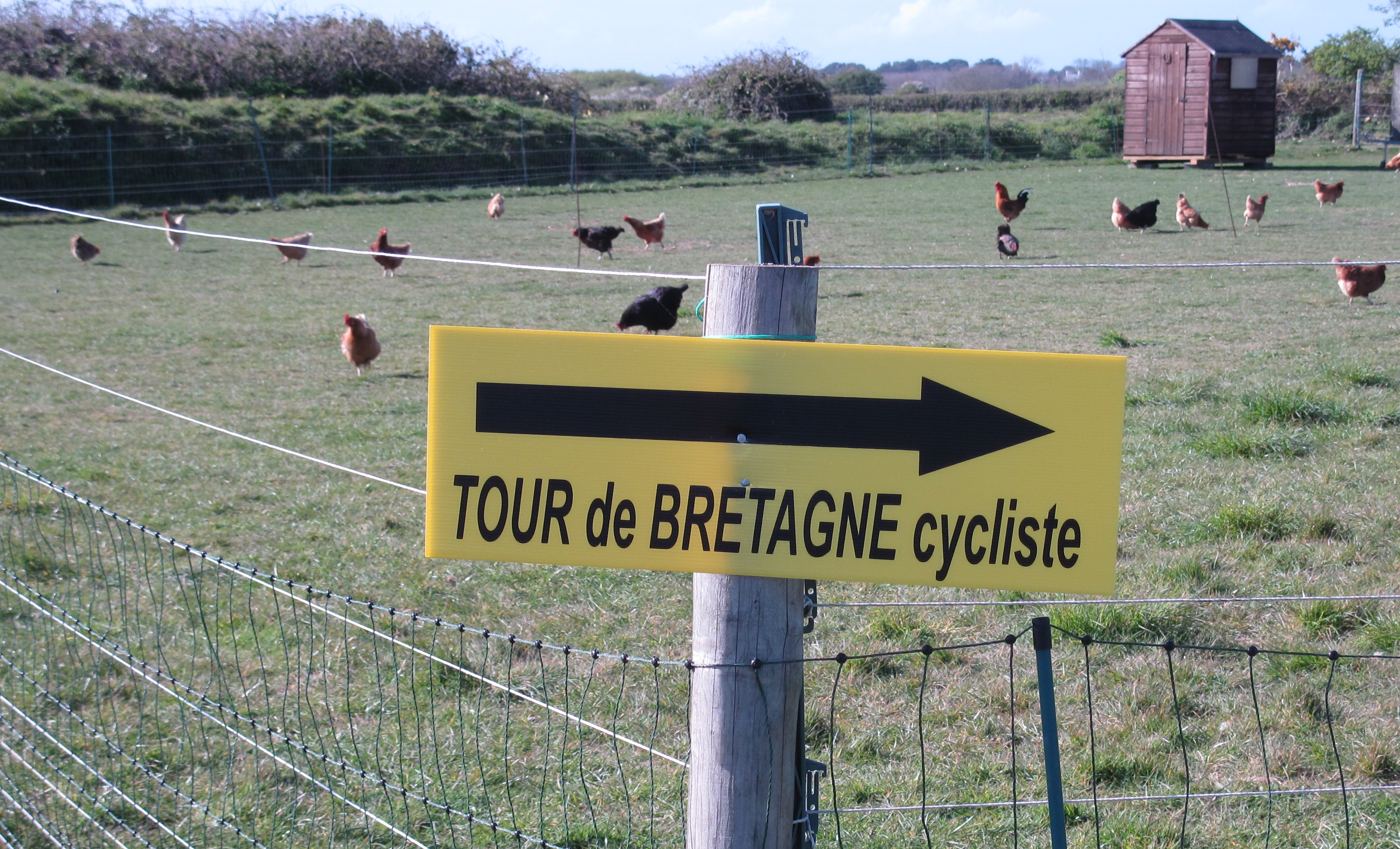

Race details
- Date: April/May
- Region: France
- English name: Tour of Brittany
- Local name(s): Tour de Bretagne trophée des granitiers Ruban Granitier Breton
- Discipline: Road
- Competition: UCI Europe Tour 2.2
- Type: Stage race
- Web site: www.tourdebretagne.bzh

History
- First edition: 1967
- Editions: 59 (as of 2026)
- First winner: Marcel Duchemin (FRA)
- Most wins: Marcel Duchemin (FRA) (3 wins)
- Most recent: Aubin Sparfel (FRA)

Tour de Bretagne Cycliste, also known as the Tour de Bretagne trophée des granitiers and formerly known as Ruban Granitier Breton, is an annual early season professional cycling stage race held in late April and early May in Brittany, France. The race often acts as a showcase for upcoming riders of the under-23 category who race together with Elite riders. The race was renamed Tour de Bretagne in 2005 when it also became a professional race.

The 2007 edition was dominated by Lars Boom and Edvald Boasson Hagen who both wore the leader's jersey and won stages of the race.

The 2008 edition was dominated by the Rabobank team with defending champion Lars Boom and Coen Vermeltfoort winning two stages each. The Bretagne Armor Lux won the general classification with Benoît Poilvet.

The 2010 edition started in Jersey – the first time stages of the race had been held outside Brittany.

== Past winners ==
Year	Country	Rider	Team
1967	France	Marcel Duchemin	OCC Laval
1968	France	Guy Ignolin	Pelforth–Sauvage
1969	France	Jean Paul Maho	Pelforth–Sauvage
1970	France	Marcel Duchemin	Frimatic–de Gribaldy
1971	France	Marcel Duchemin	Stella Philips
1972	France	André Corbeau	CSM–Puteaux
1973	Soviet Union	Boris Shukov	USSR national team
1974	Poland	Stanisław Szozda	Poland national team
1975	Soviet Union	Aleksandr Gusyatnikov	USSR national team
1976	Soviet Union	Boris Issaev	USSR national team
1977	Belgium	Daniel Willems	Belgium national team
1978	Poland	Krzysztof Sujka	Poland national team
1979	Poland	Jan Jankiewicz	Poland national team
1980	Italy	Giorgio Casati	Italy national team
1981	Belgium	Marc Somers	Belgium national team
1982	Belgium	Wim Van Eynde	Belgium national team
1983	Soviet Union	Youri Kashirin	USSR national team
1984	East Germany	Dan Radkte	East Germany national team
1985	France	Philippe Louviot	France national team
1986	France	Gilles Sanders	Bleuets France Nord
1987	Soviet Union	Igor Sumnikov	USSR national team
1988	France	Armand de Las Cuevas	France national team C
1989	Netherlands	Harm Jansen	Netherlands national team
1990	Portugal	José Marques	Portugal national team
1991	France	Richard Vivien	Normandie (selection)
1992	Russia	Evgeni Berzin	Russia national team
1993	France	Dominique Bozzi	US Créteil
1994	Ukraine	Anatoly Tchoubar	Ukraine national team
1995	France	Sébastian Guenee	France national team
1996	France	Stéphane Cueff	Mutuelle de Seine et Marne
1997	France	Philippe Bresset	Jean Floch–Mantes
1998	France	Vincent Templier	Jean Floch–Mantes
1999	France	David Dumont	CC Nogent-sur-Oise
2000	France	Martial Locatelli	Jean Floc'h
2001	France	Guillaume Judas	Jean Floc'h
2002	France	Cristophe Cousinie	France Police
2003	Kazakhstan	Dimitry Muravyev	Quick-Step
2004	France	Laurent Mangel	SCO Dijon
2005	France	Stéphane Petilleau	Bretagne-Jean Floc'h
2006	Belgium	Dries Devenyns	Beveren 2000–Quick-Step
2007	Netherlands	Lars Boom	Rabobank Continental Team
2008	France	Benoît Poilvet	Bretagne–Armor Lux
2009	France	Julien Fouchard	Côtes-d'Armor–Maître Jacques
2010	France	Franck Bouyer	Bbox Bouygues Telecom
2011	Hungary	Péter Kusztor	Atlas Personal
2012	South Africa	Reinardt Janse van Rensburg	MTN–Qhubeka
2013	Austria	Riccardo Zoidl	Gourmetfein–Simplon
2014	Netherlands	Bert-Jan Lindeman	Rabobank Development Team
2015	Belgium	Sébastien Delfosse	Wallonie-Bruxelles
2016	United States	Adrien Costa	United States national team
2017	France	Flavien Dassonville	HP BTP–Auber93
2018	France	Fabien Schmidt	Côtes d'Armor–Marie Morin
2019	France	Lorrenzo Manzin	Vital Concept–B&B Hotels
2020	No race		
2021	France	Jean-Louis Le Ny	WB-Fybolia Locminé
2022	France	Johan Le Bon	Dinan Sport Cycling
2023	Switzerland	Simon Pellaud	Tudor Pro Cycling Team
2024	Sweden	Jakob Söderqvist	Lidl–Trek Future Racing
2025	Norway	Felix Ørn-Kristoff	Wanty–Nippo–ReUz
2026	France	Aubin Sparfel	Decathlon–CMA CGM Development Team
