= Robert Oliver (cyclist) =

New Zealand cyclist

Personal information
- Born: 3 January 1950 (age 76) Wellington, New Zealand

Cycling career
- Sport: Cycling

Robert Gordon Oliver (born 3 January 1950) is a former road and track cyclist from New Zealand, who represented his native country in the individual road race at the 1972 Summer Olympics in Munich, West Germany.

Prior to becoming a cyclist, Oliver played rugby in his hometown of Waipukurau, New Zealand, where he was a halfback.
