= Benoît Poilvet =

French cyclist

Personal information
- Full name: Benoît Poilvet
- Born: 27 August 1976 (age 50) Saint-Brieuc, France
- Height: 1.83 m (6 ft 0 in)
- Weight: 71 kg (157 lb)

Cycling career
- Sport: Cycling
- Discipline: Road
- Role: Rider

Professional teams
- 2000–2007: Crédit Agricole
- 2008: Bretagne Armor Lux

Major wins
- Tour de Bretagne Cycliste

Benoît Poilvet (born 27 August 1976 in Saint-Brieuc) is a French professional road bicycle racer. He rode for UCI ProTeam Crédit Agricole between 2000 and 2007. For the 2008 season he joined the continental team Bretagne Armor Lux, with whom when the team was an amateur team he had raced. In May 2008, Poilvet took his first professional race victory with stage 5 of the Tour de Bretagne Cycliste. Poilvet also took the leader's jersey which he would keep to win the race.

== Major results ==
- Critérium International - Mountains Classification (2003)
- 1st stage 5 & overall Tour de Bretagne Cycliste
