= Tore Milsett =

Norwegian cyclist

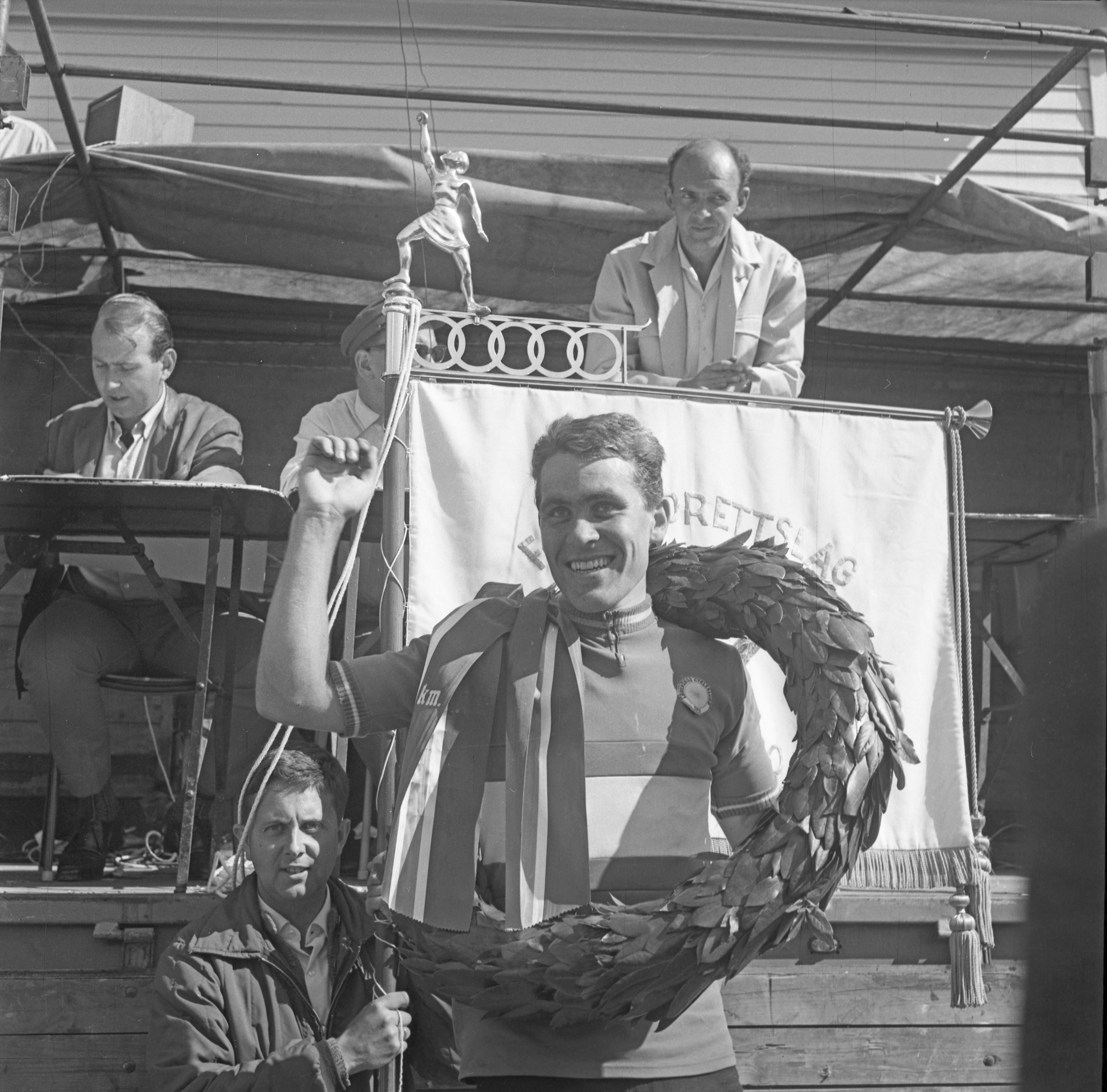
- Milsett in around 1968

Personal information
- Born: 23 April 1944 (age 82) Lørenskog, Norway

Cycling career
- Sport: Cycling

Tore Milsett (born 23 April 1944) is a Norwegian cyclist. He was born in Lørenskog.

He competed at the 1968 Summer Olympics in Mexico City, where he placed fifth in team trial with the Norwegian team, which consisted of Thorleif Andresen, Ørnulf Andresen, Leif Yli and Milsett. He won the Norwegian National Road Race Championship in 1967 and 1968.
