= Jean-Claude Meunier =

French cyclist

Personal information
- Born: 7 December 1950 Vierzon, France
- Died: 9 December 1985 (aged 35)

Cycling career
- Sport: Cycling

Jean-Claude Meunier (7 December 1950 – 9 December 1985) was a French cyclist. He competed in the team time trial at the 1972 Summer Olympics.
