= Johannes Knab =

German cyclist

Personal information
- Born: 14 September 1946 (age 80) Bamberg, Allied-occupied Germany

Cycling career
- Sport: Cycling

Johannes Knab (born 14 September 1946) is a German former cyclist. He competed for West Germany in the team time trial at the 1972 Summer Olympics.
