= Richard Ball (cyclist) =

American cyclist (born 1944)

Personal information
- Born: July 26, 1944 (age 82) Denver, Colorado, U.S.

Cycling career
- Sport: Cycling

Richard Neal Ball (born July 26, 1944) is an American former cyclist. He competed in the team time trial at the 1972 Summer Olympics.
