= Alois Holík =

Czech cyclist

Personal information
- Born: 23 September 1947 (age 79) Fryšták, Czechoslovakia

Cycling career
- Sport: Cycling

Alois Holík (born 23 September 1947) is a Czech former cyclist. He competed for Czechoslovakia in the individual road race at the 1972 Summer Olympics.
