= Hugo Schär =

Swiss cyclist

Personal information
- Born: 27 July 1948 (age 78)

Cycling career
- Sport: Cycling

Hugo Schär (born 27 July 1948) is a former Swiss cyclist. He competed in the individual road race at the 1972 Summer Olympics.
