= Emile Waldteufel (cyclist) =

American cyclist (born 1944)

Personal information
- Born: December 3, 1944 (age 81) San Rafael, California, United States

Cycling career
- Sport: Cycling

Emile Waldteufel (born December 3, 1944) is an American former cyclist. He competed in the individual road race at the 1972 Summer Olympics.
