= Tomás Nistal (cyclist) =

Spanish cyclist

Personal information
- Born: 31 August 1948 (age 78) Valladolid, Spain

Cycling career
- Sport: Cycling

Tomás Nistal Fernández (born 31 August 1948) is a former road cyclist from Spain. He was a professional cyclist from 1969 to 1977. He represented his native country at the 1972 Summer Olympics in Munich, West Germany, where he finished in 54th place in the men's individual road race.
