= Marcel Duchemin =

French cyclist (born 1944)

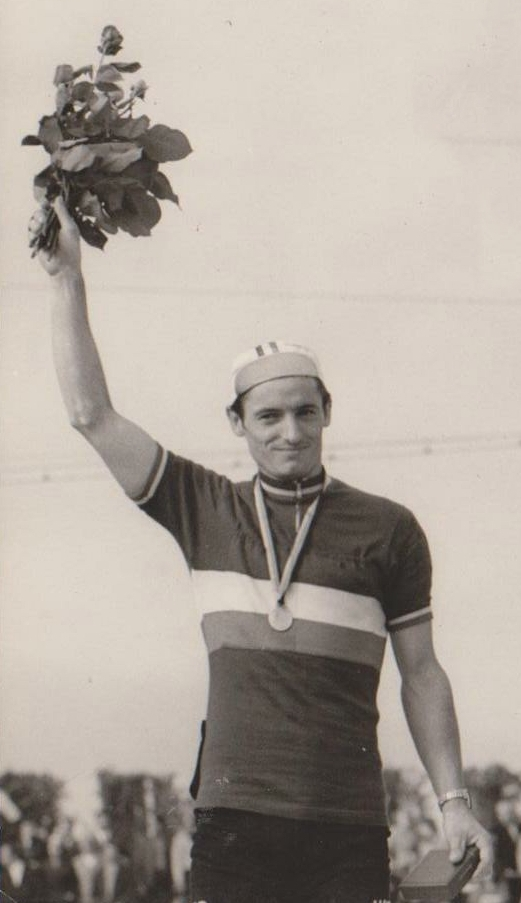
- Podium Berlin 1970

Personal information
- Born: 20 October 1944 (age 81) Montigné-le-Brillant, France

Cycling career
- Sport: Cycling
- Current team: Retired
- Discipline: Road
- Role: Rider

Major wins
- 3 stages of the Peace Race Tour de l'Avenir (1970) 3 wins of Tour de Bretagne Cycliste

Marcel Duchemin (born 20 October 1944) is a former French cyclist. He participated in the 1972 Summer Olympics in Munich and finished 42nd in the road race. His sporting career began with ABC Rex-Vox-Cinemas Le Mans.

He also won the Tour de Bretagne Cycliste 3 times.
