= Gilbert Bischoff =

Swiss cyclist

Personal information
- Born: 29 September 1951 (age 75) Salins, Switzerland

Cycling career
- Sport: Cycling

Gilbert Bischoff (born 29 September 1951) is a Swiss former cyclist. He competed in the team time trial at the 1972 Summer Olympics.
