= Ataractive =

Type of drug diminishing hallucinations

An ataractive is a type of drug which diminishes hallucinations in patients exhibiting them.

Examples include azacyclonol and atypical antipsychotics.

== See also ==
- Antipsychotic
- Tranquilizer
