= Giovanni Tonoli =

Italian cyclist

Personal information
- Born: 22 April 1947 Milan, Italy
- Died: 25 June 1993 (aged 46)

Cycling career
- Sport: Cycling

Giovanni Tonoli (22 April 1947 – 25 June 1993) was an Italian cyclist. He competed in the team time trial at the 1972 Summer Olympics.
