= Valentin Kornev =

Soviet sport shooter

Personal information
- Born: 29 August 1942 Yaroslavl, Soviet Union
- Died: 18 November 2016 (aged 74)

Sport
- Sport: Sports shooting
Medal record
Men's shooting
Representing Soviet Union
Olympic Games
Silver medal – second place	1968 Mexico City	300 m free rifle

Valentin Mikhaylovich Kornev (Russian: Валентин Михайлович Корнев, 29 August 1942 – 18 November 2016) was a Soviet sport shooter who won the silver medal in the 300 m free rifle event at the 1968 Summer Olympics in Mexico City.
