= Osvaldo Castellan =

Italian cyclist

Personal information
- Born: 21 January 1951 Padua, Italy
- Died: 23 October 2008 (aged 57)

Cycling career
- Sport: Cycling

Osvaldo Castellan (21 January 1951 – 23 October 2008) was an Italian cyclist. He competed in the team time trial at the 1972 Summer Olympics.
