= Ove Jensen (cyclist) =

Danish cyclist

Personal information
- Born: 3 September 1947 (age 79) Midtjylland, Denmark

Cycling career
- Sport: Cycling

Ove Jensen (born 3 September 1947) is a Danish former cyclist. He competed in the individual road race at the 1972 Summer Olympics.
