= Suleman Abdul Rahman =

Ethiopian cyclist

Personal information
- Born: 19 October 1942 (age 83)

Cycling career
- Sport: Cycling

Suleman Abdul Rahman (born 19 October 1942) is an Ethiopian former cyclist. He competed in the individual road race at the 1972 Summer Olympics.
