= Lino Benech =

Uruguayan cyclist (1947–2022)

Personal information
- Born: 15 October 1947
- Died: 30 December 2022 (aged 75)

Cycling career
- Sport: Cycling

Lino Benech (15 October 1947 – 30 December 2022) was a Uruguayan cyclist. He competed in the team time trial at the 1972 Summer Olympics.
