= Miguel Silva Júnior =

Brazilian cyclist

Personal information
- Born: 20 December 1948 (age 77) Itanhaém, Brazil

Cycling career
- Sport: Cycling

Miguel Silva Júnior (born 20 December 1948) is a former Brazilian cyclist. He competed in the individual road race at the 1972 Summer Olympics.
