= Popke Oosterhof =

Personal information
- Born: 3 August 1947 (age 79) Assen, the Netherlands

Sport
- Sport: Cycling
Medal record
Representing the Netherlands
UCI Road World Championships
Bronze medal – third place	1970 Leicester	Team time trial

Popke Oosterhof (born 3 August 1947) is a retired Dutch cyclist who won a bronze medal in the team time trial at the 1970 UCI Road World Championships.

In 1969 he won five stages of the Milk Race and finished second overall; he also finished second in the Belgian Grand Prix. The following year, he won the Ronde van Drenthe, Belgian Grand Prix (with Fedor den Hertog and Tino Tabak) and two stages of the Olympia's Tour.

After winning one stage of the Milk Race in 1971 he retired from cycling.
