= Antonio Hernández (cyclist) =

Mexican cyclist

Personal information
- Born: 16 May 1951 (age 75)

Cycling career
- Sport: Cycling

Antonio Hernández (born 16 May 1951) is a Mexican former cyclist who competed in the team time trial at the 1972 Summer Olympics.
