= Ivan Trifonov =

Soviet cyclist

Personal information
- Born: 15 May 1948 (age 78)

Cycling career
- Sport: Cycling

Ivan Trifonov (born 15 May 1948) is a former Soviet cyclist. He competed in the individual road race at the 1972 Summer Olympics.
