= Eugen Pleško =

Yugoslav cyclist (1948–2020)

Personal information
- Born: 10 November 1948 Zagreb, Yugoslavia (now Croatia)
- Died: 4 February 2020 (aged 71) Zagreb, Croatia
- Height: 1.75 m (5 ft 9 in)

Cycling career
- Sport: Cycling
- Discipline: Road
- Role: Cyclist

Eugen Pleško (10 November 1948 – 4 February 2020) was a Croatian cyclist. He competed in the individual road race at the 1972 Summer Olympics.
