= Karl-Heinz Oberfranz =

German cyclist

Personal information
- Born: 23 December 1951 (age 74) Bad Doberan, East Germany

Cycling career
- Sport: Cycling

Karl-Heinz Oberfranz (born 23 December 1951) is a German former cyclist. He competed in the individual road race for East Germany at the 1972 Summer Olympics.
