= Donald Packer =

Canadian water polo player (born 1948)

Personal information
- Nationality: Canadian
- Born: 29 August 1948 (age 76); Vancouver, British Columbia, Canada

Sport
- Sport: Water polo

Donald Packer (born 29 August 1948) is a Canadian water polo player. He competed in the men's tournament at the 1972 Summer Olympics.
