= THPC (drug) =

Clinical data
- Other names: UCD0162; 1-Methyl-1,2,5,6-tetrahydropyridine-3-(N,N-diethylcarboxamide); 1-Methyl-1,2,5,6-tetrahydropyridine-3-diethylcarboxamide
- Drug class: Serotonin antagonist; Serotonin 5-HT_{2A} receptor antagonist; Hallucinogen antidote
- ATC code: None

Identifiers
- IUPAC name: N,N-diethyl-1-methyl-3,6-dihydro-2H-pyridine-5-carboxamide
- CAS Number: 26070-52-0
- PubChem CID: 3084450
- ChemSpider: 2341509
- CompTox Dashboard (EPA): DTXSID90180709

Chemical and physical data
- Formula: C_{11}H_{20}N_{2}O
- Molar mass: 196.294 g·mol^{−1}
- 3D model (JSmol): Interactive image
- SMILES: CCN(CC)C(=O)C1=CCCN(C1)C
- InChI: InChI=1S/C11H20N2O/c1-4-13(5-2)11(14)10-7-6-8-12(3)9-10/h7H,4-6,8-9H2,1-3H3; Key:QELRLWHVJBVJOI-UHFFFAOYSA-N

THPC, also known as UCD0162 or as 1-methyl-1,2,5,6-tetrahydropyridine-3-diethylcarboxamide, is a greatly simplified analogue of the psychedelic lysergamide lysergic acid diethylamide (LSD) in which only a modified version of the D ring (and its substitutions) remains.

THPC was assessed and produced no behavioral effects by itself in rodents. However, the drug was reported to markedly potentiate the behavioral effects of mescaline and to inhibit the effects of LSD in rodents. It was suggested that THPC might be clinically useful as a hallucinogen antagonist against LSD, for instance in the context of recreational LSD use. In any case, findings of these studies were based on very small numbers of animals and have been limitedly or not replicated.

Subsequent studies of THPC in several in vitro and in vivo systems have provided mixed results. It has been found to strongly contract smooth muscle, but the mechanism of this action, such as α-adrenergic or histamine receptor activation, has not been determined, except that it was not reversed by serotonin antagonists. In another study, THPC antagonized the contractions of sheep umbilical vasculature induced by serotonin, mescaline, and LSD, and it was concluded that THPC is a weak serotonin antagonist. Accordingly, THPC was found to completely block LSD binding to receptors in synaptosomal membranes from rat forebrain. However, THPC reportedly did not block serotonin binding in this preparation. In any case, this binding site is said to have been later identified as the serotonin 5-HT_{2A} receptor in 1979. In other studies, THPC did not block various specific effects of mescaline and LSD.

THPC was first described in the scientific literature by John Raymond Smythies and colleagues in 1970. It was reviewed by David E. Nichols in his thesis in 1973 and by Steven A. Barker in 2025. Along with other drugs like chlorpromazine, 2-bromo-LSD, and cinanserin, THPC was one of the first claimed antagonists of the behavioral effects of LSD to be identified. Various analogues of THPC have also been synthesized and studied, including as serotonin antagonists.

== See also ==
- Partial lysergamide
- Nikethamide
- Arecoline
- Azacyclonol
