= Valery Likhachov =

Russian cyclist

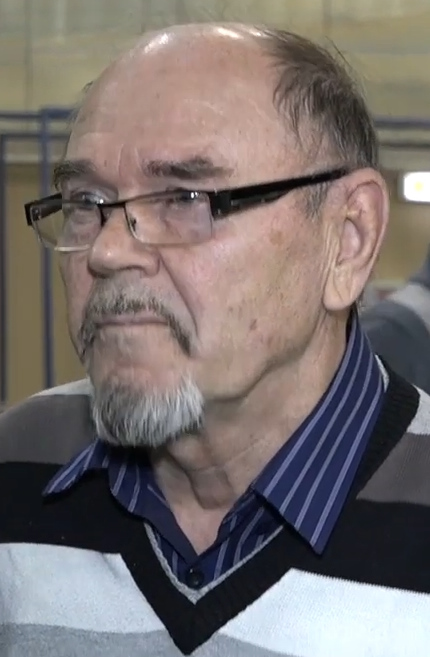
- Likhachov in 2019

Personal information
- Born: 5 December 1947 (age 78) Novosheshminsk, Tatarstan, Russian SFSR, Soviet Union
- Height: 1.76 m (5 ft 9 in)
- Weight: 73 kg (161 lb)

Sport
- Sport: Cycling
- Club: Trud Gorky
Medal record
Representing the Soviet Union
Olympic Games
Gold medal – first place	1972 Munich	Team time trial
World championships
Gold medal – first place	1970 Leicester	Team time trial

Valery Nikolayevich Likhachov (Russian: Валерий Николаевич Лихачëв; born 5 December 1947) is a retired Russian cyclist. He was part of the Soviet team that won the 100 km team time trial event at the 1970 UCI Road World Championships and the 1972 Summer Olympics; individually, he finished in 34th place in the road race in 1972.

In 1972 he also won the Tour du Maroc and Tour de la Province de Namur. Next year he won six stages of the Peace Race, finishing third overall; in 1975, he won three stages individually, and the overall race in the team competition.
