= Sverre Kile =

Norwegian swimmer

Personal information
- Born: 17 May 1953 (age 73) Ulsteinvik, Norway

Sport
- Country: Norway
- Sport: Swimming
- Club: BSC 1908

Sverre Kile (born 17 May 1953) is a former freestyle and medley Norwegian swimmer. He won 18 national titles, and represented Norway internationally.

== Sports career ==
Kile was born in Ulsteinvik on 17 May 1953. He competed at the 1972 Summer Olympics in Munich, in 400 metre freestyle and 400 metre individual medley.

Kile became Nordic champion in 1500 meter freestyle swimming in 1969. He won a total of 18 individual national titles between 1969 and 1972, and was awarded the Kongepokal trophy twice.
