= Gianluca Esposito =

Italian footballer

Personal information
- Date of birth: 7 March 1995 (age 31)
- Place of birth: Naples, Italy
- Height: 1.81 m (5 ft 11 in)
- Position: Midfielder

Team information
- Current team: Cavese
- Number: 20

Senior career*
Years	Team	Apps	(Gls)
2013–2015	Savoia	15	(2)
2014–2015	→ Agropoli (loan)	17	(0)
2015–2016	Rimini	25	(1)
2016–2018	Juve Stabia	11	(0)
2017–2018	→ Sicula Leonzio (loan)	29	(2)
2018–2020	Sicula Leonzio	43	(0)
2020	Fermana	5	(0)
2020–2021	Cavese	15	(0)
2021	Ravenna	19	(0)
2021–2026	Renate	128	(2)
2026–	Cavese	1	(0)
- * Club domestic league appearances and goals as of 21 August 2026

Gianluca Esposito (born 7 March 1995) is an Italian professional footballer who plays as a midfielder for Serie C Group C club Cavese.

== Club career ==
Born in Naples, Esposito made his senior debut for Savoia on 2013–14 season. Savoia won the promotion that year, and the midfielder made his Serie C debut on 11 October 2014 against Salernitana. In December 2014, he joined Agropoli on loan.

After left Savoia in 2015, he played for many Serie C teams like:Rimini, Juve Stabia, Sicula Leonzio, Fermana, Cavese and Ravenna.

On 30 August 2021, he signed with Renate.
