= Enrique Allyón =

Peruvian cyclist

Personal information
- Born: 29 November 1952 (age 73) Breña, Peru

Cycling career
- Sport: Cycling

Enrique Ángel Allyón Padilla (born 29 November 1952) is a former Peruvian cyclist. He competed in the individual road race at the 1972 Summer Olympics.
