= José Marroquín (sport shooter) =

Guatemalan sports shooter (born 1943)

Personal information
- Born: 31 May 1943 (age 83) Guatemala City, Guatemala

Sport
- Sport: Sports shooting

José Marroquín (born 31 May 1943) is a Guatemalan former sports shooter. He competed in the 300 metre rifle event at the 1968 Summer Olympics.
