= Helge Anshushaug =

Norwegian sport shooter (born 1948)

Personal information
- Born: 29 January 1948 (age 78) Soknedal, Norway

Sport
- Sport: Sports shooting

Helge Anshushaug (born 29 January 1948) is a retired Norwegian sport shooter. He was born in Soknedal. He competed at the 1972 Summer Olympics in Munich and at the 1976 Summer Olympics in Montreal.
