= Lindsay Gauld =

Canadian cyclist

Personal information
- Born: 14 May 1948 (age 78) Brandon, Manitoba, Canada

Cycling career
- Sport: Cycling

Lindsay Gauld (born 14 May 1948) is a Canadian former cyclist. He competed in the individual road race at the 1972 Summer Olympics.
