= Fernando Cuenca =

Peruvian cyclist

Personal information
- Born: 1 July 1950 (age 76)

Cycling career
- Sport: Cycling

Fernando Cuenca (born 1 July 1950) is a former Peruvian cyclist. He competed in the individual road race and team time trial events at the 1972 Summer Olympics.
