= Jiří Prchal =

Czech cyclist

Personal information
- Born: 19 August 1948
- Died: 9 September 1994 (aged 46)

Cycling career
- Sport: Cycling

Jiří Prchal (19 August 1948 – 9 September 1994) was a Czech cyclist. He competed in the individual road race at the 1972 Summer Olympics.
