= Dieter Gonschorek =

East German cyclist

Personal information
- Born: 19 September 1944 (age 82) Schwerin, Germany

Cycling career
- Sport: Cycling

Dieter Gonschorek (born 19 September 1944) is a German former cyclist. He competed in the individual road race for East Germany at the 1972 Summer Olympics. He won the DDR Rundfahrt in 1973.
