= Gąsior (surname) =

Gąsior or Gonsior (Polish pronunciation: [ˈɡɔ̃ɕɔr]) is a Polish-language surname, meaning "gander". Pronounced identically, Gąsior is the standard spelling in Poland while Gonsior appears at a lower frequency. Alternative forms include Gęsior and Gensior, which are likewise pronounced identically (both [ˈɡɛ̃ɕɔr]).

== People ==
- Dariusz Gęsior (born 1969), Polish footballer
- Bohdan Gonsior (born 1937), Polish fencer
- Franciszek Gąsior (1947–2021), Polish handball player
- Łukasz Gąsior (born 1986), Polish swimmer
- Włodzimierz Gąsior (born 1948), Polish football manager
