= Alan Pyle =

Canadian water polo player (born 1946)

Personal information
- Born: 27 August 1946 (age 78); Toronto, Ontario, Canada

Sport
- Sport: Water polo

Alan Pyle (born 27 August 1946) is a Canadian water polo player. He competed in the men's tournament at the 1972 Summer Olympics.
