= Jiří Mainuš =

Czech cyclist

Personal information
- Born: 8 January 1945 (age 81)

Cycling career
- Sport: Cycling

Jiří Mainuš (born 8 January 1945) is a former Czech cyclist. He competed in the team time trial at the 1972 Summer Olympics.
