= Pramote Sangskulrote =

Thai cyclist

Personal information
- Born: 5 July 1952 (age 74)

Cycling career
- Sport: Cycling

Pramote Sangskulrote (born 5 July 1952) is a former Thai cyclist. He competed in the individual road race at the 1972 Summer Olympics.
