= Louis Bezzina =

Maltese cyclist

Personal information
- Born: 19 September 1951 (age 75)

Cycling career
- Sport: Cycling

Louis Bezzina (born 19 September 1951) is a former Maltese cyclist. He competed in the team time trial at the 1972 Summer Olympics.
