= José Tena (cyclist) =

Spanish cyclist (born 1951)

Personal information
- Full name: José Tena Ambrós
- Born: 23 January 1951 (age 75) Molins de Rei, Spain

Cycling career
- Sport: Cycling

José Tena (born 23 January 1951) is a former Spanish cyclist. He competed in the team time trial at the 1972 Summer Olympics.
