= Joseph Said =

Maltese cyclist

Personal information
- Born: 20 April 1954 (age 72)

Cycling career
- Sport: Cycling

Joseph Said (born 20 April 1954) is a former Maltese cyclist. He competed in the team time trial at the 1972 Summer Olympics.
