= Teodor Vasile =

Romanian cyclist

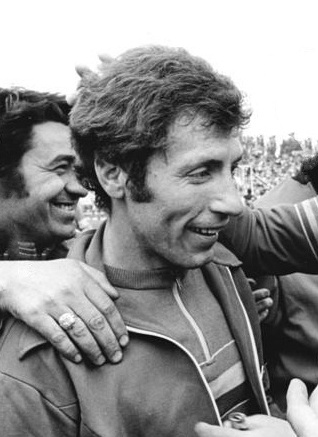
- Teodor Vasile in 1977

Personal information
- Born: 16 August 1947 (age 79) Ploieşti, Romania
- Height: 1.73 m (5 ft 8 in)
- Weight: 66 kg (146 lb)

Sport
- Sport: Cycling

Teodor Vasile (born 16 August 1947) is a retired Romanian cyclist. He competed at the 1972 and 1980 Summer Olympics in the individual road race and finished in 60th place in 1972. He won one stage of the Peace Race in 1977.

In 1975, he was the Romanian national champion in a road race.
