= Sataporn Kantasa-ard =

Thai cyclist (born 1950)

Personal information
- Born: 7 July 1950 (age 76)

Cycling career
- Sport: Cycling

Sataporn Kantasa-ard (born 7 July 1950) is a former Thai cyclist. He competed in the individual road race and team time trial events at the 1972 Summer Olympics.
