= Donald Jackson (archer) =

Canadian archer (1932–2009)

Personal information
- Born: 25 October 1932 Lindsay, Ontario, Canada
- Died: 26 January 2009 (aged 76) Lindsay, Ontario, Canada

Sport
- Sport: Archery

Donald Jackson (25 October 1932 – 26 January 2009) was a Canadian archer. He competed in the men's individual event at the 1972 Summer Olympics.
