= Jan Henriksen =

Norwegian cyclist

Personal information
- Born: 15 April 1946 Skien, Norway
- Died: 30 September 2017 (aged 71)

Cycling career
- Sport: Cycling

Jan Henriksen (15 April 1946 – 30 September 2017) was a Norwegian cyclist. He competed in the individual road race at the 1972 Summer Olympics.
