= Sivaporn Ratanapool =

Thai cyclist

Personal information
- Born: 17 March 1954 (age 72)

Cycling career
- Sport: Cycling

Sivaporn Ratanapool (born 17 March 1954) is a former Thai cyclist. He competed in the individual road race and team time trial events at the 1972 Summer Olympics.
