= Jack Gauldie =

Canadian pathologist

Jack Gauldie, CM FRSC (born 14 November 1942) is a Canadian pathologist, having been a Distinguished University Professor at McMaster University.

== Sporting career ==
Gauldie was also a Canadian water polo player. He competed in the men's tournament at the 1972 Summer Olympics.
