= Bernardo Arias =

Peruvian cyclist

Personal information
- Born: 20 August 1942 (age 84)

Cycling career
- Sport: Cycling

Bernardo Arias (born 20 August 1942) is a former Peruvian cyclist. He competed in the team time trial at the 1972 Summer Olympics.
