= Deane Buckboro =

Canadian swimmer

Personal information
- Born: 3 September 1953 (age 72) Grande Prairie, Alberta, Canada

Sport
- Sport: Swimming

Deane Buckboro (born 3 September 1953) is a Canadian former swimmer. He competed in two events at the 1972 Summer Olympics.
