= Boris Shukhov =

Soviet cyclist

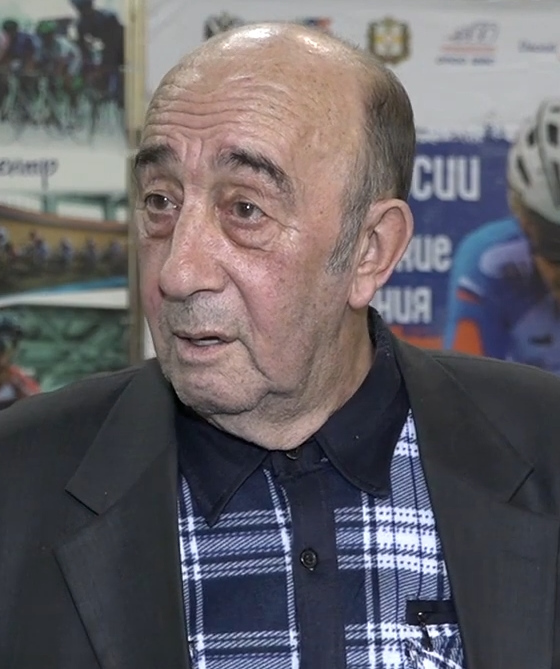
- Shukhov in 2019

Personal information
- Born: 8 May 1947 (age 79) Kodyma, Ukrainian SSR, Soviet Union
- Height: 1.76 m (5 ft 9 in)
- Weight: 72 kg (159 lb)

Sport
- Sport: Cycling
- Club: Spartak Nalchik/SKA Kuybyshev
Medal record
Representing the Soviet Union
Olympic Games
| Gold medal – first place | 1972 Munich | Team time trial |
World championships
| Gold medal – first place | 1970 Leicester | Team time trial |
| Silver medal – second place | 1973 Barcelona | Team time trial |

Boris Khabalovich Shukhov (Russian: Борис Хабалович Шухов; born 8 May 1947) is a retired Soviet cyclist. He was part of the Soviet team that finished in ninth place at the 1968 Summer Olympics and won a gold medal in the 100 km team time trial at the 1972 Summer Olympics. At the world championships, he won a gold medal in 1970 and a silver in 1973 in the same event. Individually, he won the Tour de Bretagne Cycliste in 1973.
