= Ørjan Madsen =

Norwegian swimmer

Personal information
- Nationality: Norwegian
- Born: 3 March 1946 (age 79) Bergen, Norway

Sport
- Sport: Swimming
- Club: Bergens Svømme Club

Ørjan Odd Madsen (born 3 March 1946) is a Norwegian freestyle swimmer. He was born in Bergen. He competed at the 1968 Summer Olympics in Mexico City. He won a total of fifteen gold medals at the Norwegian championships.

== Biography ==
A swimmer for Bergen Svømme Club, Madsen won 15 Norwegian championship titles between 1964 and 1970, including nine in freestyle, five in medley, and one in butterfly. Madsen competed in the 1968 Summer Olympics. In 1969, he became the Nordic champion in the 100-meter freestyle. In 1968 and 1970, he won the Norwegian King's Cup. Madsen was the head coach of the Norwegian swimming team.

From 1972 to 1977, the Norwegian worked as head coach of the club Schwimm- und Sportfreunde Bonn 1905 (SSF) Bonn. Madsen studied at the German Sport University Cologne (DSHS), where his doctoral thesis was accepted in 1982 (title: Investigations on variables influencing parameters of energy metabolism in free crawl swimming). At the Sport University as well as at the Rheinische Friedrich-Wilhelms-Universität Bonn, Madsen worked as a teacher. Between 1989 and 1992, he worked for SG Hamburg, where he held the position of head coach.
