= Gilberto Chocce =

Peruvian cyclist

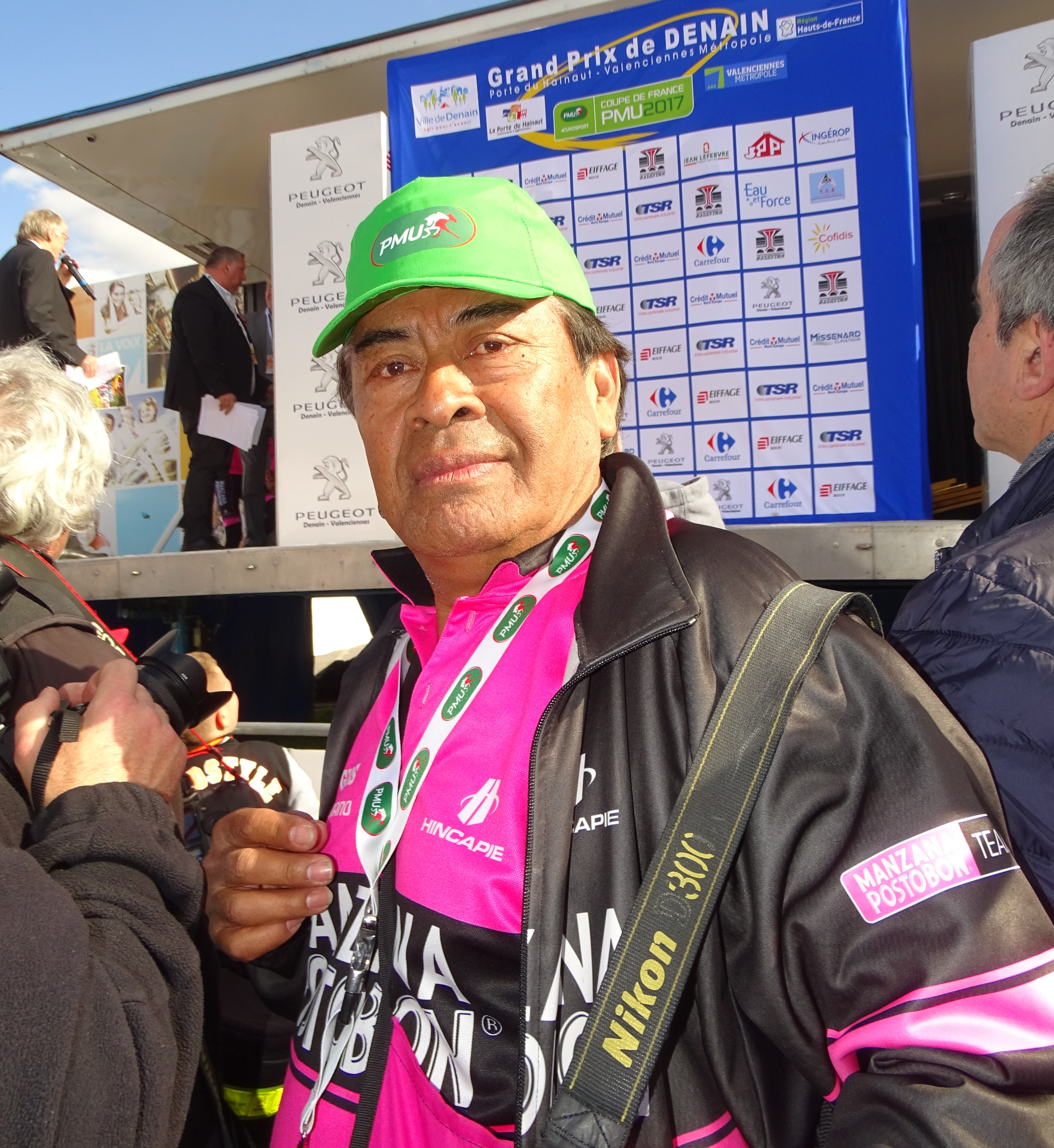
- Gilberto Chocce at the 2017 Grand Prix de Denain.

Personal information
- Born: 22 March 1950 (age 76)

Cycling career
- Sport: Cycling

Gilberto Chocce (born 22 March 1950) is a former Peruvian cyclist. He competed in the individual road race and team time trial events at the 1972 Summer Olympics.
