= Lucjan Lis =

Polish cyclist (1950–2015)

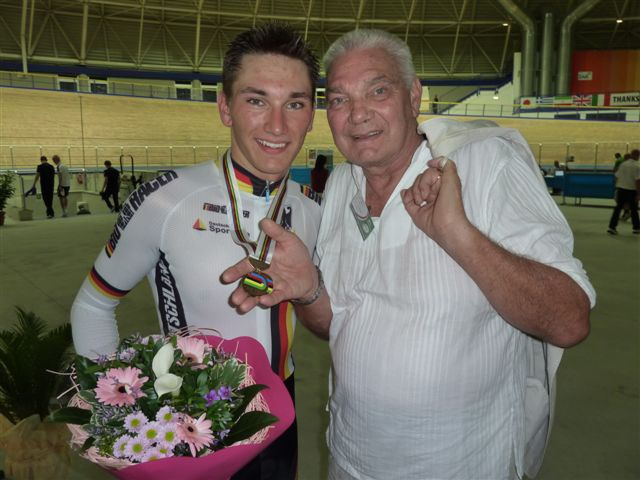
- Lis with his son in 2010

Personal information
- Born: 8 August 1950 Bytom, Poland
- Died: 26 January 2015 (aged 64)
- Height: 1.84 m (6 ft 0 in)
- Weight: 76 kg (168 lb)

Sport
- Sport: Cycling
- Club: Ruchu Radzionków
Medal record
Representing Poland
Olympic Games
Silver medal – second place	1972 Munich	Team time trial
World championships
Gold medal – first place	1973 Barcelona	Team time trial
Bronze medal – third place	1971 Mendrisio	Team time trial

Lucjan Roman Lis (8 August 1950 – 26 January 2015) was a Polish cyclist. He had his greatest success in the 100 km team time trial. In this event he won a silver medal at the 1972 Summer Olympics as well as a bronze and a gold medal at the world championships in 1971 and 1973, respectively. He was less successful in the individual road race, finishing in 36th place at the 1972 Olympics. In 1973 he won the Tour de Pologne individually and the Peace Race with the Polish team.

Lis grew up in a small neighborhood in the coal mining city of Bytom and had a degree in mining. He started training in cycling following his elder brother Marian. In 1971 he had a serious injury of the achilles tendon that almost ended his career, but he recovered. He retired from competitions in 1975 and later had serious kidney problems. He married Barbara Lis, a nurse. They have two daughters, Laura and Romana, and a son Lucas, a competitive German cyclist. They lived together in Germany. Lis died of a ruptured aorta on 26 January 2015, at the age of 64.
