= Alfred Tonna =

Maltese cyclist

Personal information
- Born: 31 May 1950 (age 76)

Cycling career
- Sport: Cycling

Alfred Tonna (born 31 May 1950) is a Maltese former cyclist. He competed at the 1972 Summer Olympics and the 1980 Summer Olympics.
