= Jack McCullough (cyclist) =

Canadian cyclist

Personal information
- Born: 28 November 1949 (age 76) Winnipeg, Manitoba, Canada

Cycling career
- Sport: Cycling

Jack McCullough (born 28 November 1949) is a Canadian former cyclist. He competed in the team time trial at the 1972 Summer Olympics.
