= Ørnulf Andresen =

Norwegian cyclist

Personal information
- Full name: Ørnulf Reidar Andresen
- Born: 6 January 1944 (age 82) Ski, Akershus, Norway

Cycling career
- Sport: Cycling

Ørnulf Reidar Andresen (born 6 January 1944) is a Norwegian cyclist. He was born in Ski, and is a brother of Thorleif Andresen. He competed at the 1968 Summer Olympics in Mexico City, where he placed fifth in team trial with the Norwegian team.
