= Jaime Huélamo =

Spanish cyclist

Personal information
- Born: 17 November 1948 La Melgosa, Spain
- Died: 31 January 2014 (aged 65) La Melgosa, Spain

Cycling career
- Sport: Cycling

Jaime Huélamo (17 November 1948 – 31 January 2014) was a road racing cyclist from Spain, who was a professional rider from 1973 to 1975. He was born in Cuenca, Spain. He represented his native country at the 1972 Summer Olympics in Munich, West Germany, where he finished third in the men's individual road race but was disqualified and stripped of the bronze medal after failing a drug test.

== See also ==
- List of sportspeople sanctioned for doping offences
- List of doping cases in cycling
