= Jan von Koss =

Norwegian fencer

Personal information
- Born: 26 September 1945 (age 80) Oslo, Norway

Sport
- Sport: Fencing

Jan von Koss (born 26 September 1945) is a Norwegian épée fencer. He competed at the 1968 and 1972 Summer Olympics.
