= John Rødseth =

Norwegian sport shooter (born 1947)

Personal information
- Born: 11 July 1947 (age 78) Kongsberg, Norway

Sport
- Sport: Sports shooting

John Rødseth (born 11 July 1947) is a Norwegian sport shooter. He was born in Kongsberg. He competed at the 1968 Summer Olympics in Mexico City, at the 1972 Summer Olympics in Munich and at the 1976 Summer Olympics in Montreal.
