= Elling Øvergård =

Norwegian sports shooter (1947–1999)

Personal information
- Born: 6 May 1947 Raufoss, Norway
- Died: 17 March 1999 (aged 51) Oslo, Norway

Sport
- Sport: Sports shooting

Elling Øvergård (6 May 1947 – 17 March 1999) was a Norwegian sports shooter. He competed in three events at the 1968 Summer Olympics.
