= Stephen Hart (water polo) =

Canadian water polo player (born 1953)

Personal information
- Born: 11 April 1953 (age 72); Montreal, Quebec, Canada

Sport
- Sport: Water polo

Stephen Hart (born 11 April 1953) is a Canadian water polo player. He competed in the men's tournament at the 1972 Summer Olympics.
