= Arve Haugen =

Norwegian cyclist

Personal information
- Born: 28 May 1943 (age 83) Trondheim, Norway

Cycling career
- Sport: Cycling

Arve Haugen (born 28 May 1943) is a Norwegian cyclist. He was born in Trondheim. He competed at the 1972 Summer Olympics in Munich, where he placed fifth in team trial with the Norwegian team, which consisted of Knut Knudsen, Thorleif Andresen, Magne Orre and Haugen.
