= Leif Yli =

Norwegian cyclist

Personal information
- Born: 11 October 1942 (age 84) Notodden, Norway

Cycling career
- Sport: Cycling

Leif Yli (born 11 October 1942) is a Norwegian cyclist. He was born in Notodden. He competed at the 1968 Summer Olympics in Mexico City, where he placed fifth in team trial with the Norwegian team.
