= Tom Morris (cyclist) =

Canadian cyclist

Personal information
- Born: 18 September 1944 (age 82) Livingston, West Lothian, Scotland

Cycling career
- Sport: Cycling

Tom Morris (born 18 September 1944) is a Canadian former cyclist. He competed at the 1972 Summer Olympics and the 1976 Summer Olympics.
