= Brian Chewter =

Canadian cyclist (1954–2020)

Brian Gordon Chewter
Personal information
- Born: 2 February 1954 Hamilton, Ontario, Canada
- Died: 26 July 2020 (aged 66) Simcoe, Ontario, Canada

Cycling career
- Sport: Cycling

Brian Gordon Chewter (2 February 1954 – 26 July 2020) was a Canadian cyclist. He competed at the 1972 and 1976 Summer Olympics.

He died from cancer on 26 July 2020 at the age of 66.
