= Gilles Durand =

Canadian cyclist

Personal information
- Born: 11 January 1952 (age 74) Montreal, Quebec, Canada

Cycling career
- Sport: Cycling

Gilles Durand (born 11 January 1952) is a Canadian former cyclist. He competed at the 1972 Summer Olympics and the 1976 Summer Olympics.
