= Bjørn Bakken =

Norwegian sports shooter (born 1941)

Personal information
- Born: 20 July 1941 (age 84) Hurdal, Norway

Sport
- Sport: Sports shooting

Bjørn Bakken (born 20 July 1941) is a Norwegian former sports shooter. He competed at the 1968 Summer Olympics and the 1972 Summer Olympics.
