= Thorleif Andresen =

Norwegian cyclist (1945–2022)

Personal information
- Born: 14 February 1945 Enebakk, Norway
- Died: 4 August 2022 (aged 77) Chiang Rai, Thailand

Cycling career
- Sport: Cycling

Thorleif Andresen (14 February 1945 – 4 August 2022) was a Norwegian cyclist.

Andresen was born in Enebakk on 14 February 1945, and was a younger brother of Ørnulf Andresen. He competed at the 1968, 1972 and the 1976 Summer Olympics. He also won the Norwegian National Road Race Championship in 1969 and 1971.

In 1985 he was awarded Gullplaketten from the Norwegian Cycling Federation, their most prestigious award.

He died in Chiang Rai, Thailand on 4 August 2022.
