= Italy at the 1972 Summer Olympics =

- IOC code: ITA
- NOC: Italian National Olympic Committee

in Munich
- Competitors: 224 (197 men and 27 women) in 19 sports
- Flag bearer: Abdon Pamich
- Medals Ranked 10th: Gold 5 Silver 3 Bronze 10 Total 18

Summer Olympics appearances (overview)
- 1896; 1900; 1904; 1908; 1912; 1920; 1924; 1928; 1932; 1936; 1948; 1952; 1956; 1960; 1964; 1968; 1972; 1976; 1980; 1984; 1988; 1992; 1996; 2000; 2004; 2008; 2012; 2016; 2020; 2024

Other related appearances
- 1906 Intercalated Games

Italy competed at the 1972 Summer Olympics in Munich, West Germany. 224 competitors, 197 men and 27 women, took part in 123 events in 19 sports.

== Medalists ==
=== Gold ===
- Klaus Dibiasi — Diving, Men's 10m Platform
- Graziano Mancinelli — Equestrian, Jumping Individual Competition
- Rolando Rigoli, Cesare Salvadori, Michele Maffei, Mario Aldo Montano, and Mario Tullio Montano — Fencing, Men's Sabre Team Competition
- Antonella Ragno-Lonzi — Fencing, Women's Foil Individual Competition
- Angelo Scalzone — Shooting, Trap Individual Competition

=== Silver ===
- Giorgio Cagnotto — Diving, Men's 3m Springboard
- Alessandro Argenton — Equestrian, Three-Day Event Individual Competition
- Novella Calligaris — Swimming, Women's 400m Freestyle

=== Bronze ===
- Pietro Mennea — Athletics, Men's 200m
- Paola Pigni — Athletics, Women's 1.500m
- Giorgio Cagnotto — Diving, Men's 10m Platform
- Anselmo Silvino — Weightlifting, Men's Middleweight
- Raimondo D'Inzeo, Piero D'Inzeo, Vittorio Orlandi, and Graziano Mancinelli — Equestrian, Jumping Team Competition
- Silvano Basagni — Shooting, Trap Individual Competition
- Novella Calligaris — Swimming, Women's 800m Freestyle
- Novella Calligaris — Swimming, Women's 400m Individual Medley
- Giuseppe Bognanni — Wrestling, Men's Greco-Roman Flyweight
- Gian-Matteo Ranzi — Wrestling, Men's Greco-Roman Lightweight

== Archery ==
In the first modern archery competition at the Olympics, Italy entered three men. Their highest placing competitor was Alfredo Massazza, at 31st place.

Men's Individual Competition:

- Alfredo Massazza - 2340 points (→ 31st place)
- Giancarlo Ferrari - 2322 points (→ 33rd place)
- Sante Spigarelli - 2300 points (→ 35th place)

== Athletics ==
Men's 800 metres

- Franco Arese
  - Heat — DNS (→ did not advance)

Men's 1500 metres

- Franco Arese
  - Heat — 3:44.0
  - Semifinals — 3:41.1 (→ did not advance)
- Gianni del Buono
  - Heat — 3:40.8
  - Semifinals — 3:42.0 (→ did not advance)

Men's 4 × 100 m Relay

- Vincenzo Guerini, Ennio Preatoni, Luigi Benedetti, and Pietro Mennea
  - Heat — 39.29s
  - Semifinals — 39.21s
  - Final — 39.14s (→ 8th place)

Men's High Jump

- Enzo del Forno
  - Qualifying Round — 2.15m
  - Final — 2.15m (→ 10th place)
- Marco Schivo
  - Qualifying Round — 2.15m
  - Final — 2.10m (→ 17th place)

== Basketball ==
Men's Team Competition

- Preliminary Round (Group B)
  - Lost to Yugoslavia (78-85)
  - Defeated Senegal (92-56)
  - Lost to Soviet Union (66-79)
  - Defeated West Germany (68-57)
  - Defeated Poland (71-59)
  - Defeated Puerto Rico (71-54)
  - Defeated Philippines (101-81)
- Semi Finals
  - Lost to United States (38-68)
- Bronze Medal Match
  - Lost to Cuba (65-66) → Fourth place
- Team Roster
  - Ottorino Flaborea
  - Giuseppe Brumatti
  - Giorgio Giomo
  - Mauro Cerioni
  - Massimo Masini
  - Renzo Bariviera
  - Marino Zanatta
  - Dino Meneghin
  - Pierluigi Marzorati
  - Luigi Serafini
  - Ivan Bisson
  - Giulio Iellini

== Boxing ==
Men's Light Flyweight:

- Gaetano Curcetti
1. 1/16-Final - Lost to Kadir Syed Abdul of Singapore (3 round, RSC)

Men's Flyweight:

- Franco Udella
1. 1/16-Final - Defeated Filex Maina of Kenya (5 - 0)
2. 1/8-Final - Lost to Boris Zoriktuev of USSR (1 - 4)

Men's Featherweight:

- Pasqualino Morbidelli
1. 1/32-Final - Defeated Morgan Mwenya of Zambia (5 - 0)
2. 1/16-Final - Defeated Ebu Sef Tatar of Turkey (5 -0 )
3. 1/8-Final - Lost to Royal Kobayashi of Japan (1 round, KO)

Men's Lightweight:

- Giambattista Capretti
1. 1/32-Final - Defeated José Martinez of Canada (2 round, RSC)
2. 1/16-Final - Lost to László Orbán of Hungary (1 - 4)

Men's Light Welterweight:

- Ernesto Bergamasco
1. 1/16-Final - Lost to Srisook Bantow of Thailand (1 - 4)

Men's Welterweight:

- Damiano Lassandro
1. 1/32-Final - Lost to Emilio Correa of Cuba (0 - 5)

Men's Light Middleweight:

- Antonio Castellini
1. 1/16-Final - Lost to Wiesław Rudkowski of Poland (0 - 5)

Men's Light Heavyweight:

- Guglielmo Spinello
1. 1/16-Final - Defeated Samson Laizer of Tanzania (2round KO)
2. 1/8-Final - Lost to Rudi Hornig of West Germany (1 - 4)

== Cycling ==
Fifteen cyclists represented Italy in 1972.

Individual road race

- Francesco Moser — 8th place
- Walter Riccomi — 49th place
- Aldo Parecchini — did not finish (→ no ranking)
- Franco Ongarato — did not finish (→ no ranking)

Team time trial

- Osvaldo Castellan
- Pasqualino Moretti
- Francesco Moser
- Giovanni Tonoli

Sprint

- Massimo Marino
- Ezio Cardi

1000m time trial

- Ezio Cardi
  - Final — 1:07.80 (→ 9th place)

Tandem

- Dino Verzini and Giorgio Rossi → 9th place

Individual pursuit

- Luciano Borgognoni

Team pursuit

- Pietro Algeri
- Giacomo Bazzan
- Giorgio Morbiato
- Luciano Borgognoni

== Diving ==
Men's 3m Springboard

- Giorgio Cagnotto — 591.63 points (→ Silver Medal)
- Klaus Dibiasi — 559.05 points (→ 4th place)

Men's 10m Platform

- Klaus Dibiasi — 504.12 points (→ Gold Medal)
- Giorgio Cagnotto — 475.83 points (→ Bronze Medal)

== Fencing ==
19 fencers, 14 men and 5 women, represented Italy in 1972.

Men's foil

- Nicola Granieri
- Stefano Simoncelli
- Arcangelo Pinelli

Men's team foil

- Alfredo Del Francia, Nicola Granieri, Carlo Montano, Arcangelo Pinelli, Stefano Simoncelli

Men's épée

- Nicola Granieri
- Claudio Francesconi
- Gianluigi Saccaro

Men's team épée

- Claudio Francesconi, Nicola Granieri, Gianluigi Placella, Gianluigi Saccaro, Pier Alberto Testoni

Men's sabre

- Michele Maffei
- Mario Aldo Montano
- Rolando Rigoli

Men's team sabre

- Michele Maffei, Rolando Rigoli, Cesare Salvadori, Mario Aldo Montano, Mario Tullio Montano

Women's foil

- Antonella Ragno-Lonzi
- Maria Consolata Collino
- Giulia Lorenzoni

Women's team foil

- Antonella Ragno-Lonzi, Giulia Lorenzoni, Der Reka Cipriani, Maria Consolata Collino, Giuseppina Bersani

== Modern pentathlon ==
Three male pentathletes represented Italy in 1972.

Men's Individual Competition:

- Mario Medda - 4850 points (→ 16th place)
- Giovanni Perugini - 4571 points (→ 34th place)
- Nicolo Deligia - 4492 points (→ 39th place)

Men's Team Competition:

- Medda, Perugini, and Deligia - 13913 points (→ 10th place)

== Rowing ==
Men's Coxed Pairs

- Giampaolo Tronchin, Mario Semenzato and Siro Kuhnke Meli
  - Heat — 8:02.79
  - Repechage — 8:10.46 (→ did not advance)

== Shooting ==
Eleven male shooters represented Italy in 1972. In the trap event, Angelo Scalzone won gold and Silvano Basagni won bronze.

25 m pistol

- Giovanni Liverzani
- Roberto Ferraris

50 m pistol

- Giuseppe De Chirico
- Piero Errani

50 m rifle, three positions

- Giuseppe De Chirico
- Walter Frescura

50 m rifle, prone

- Giovanni Mezzani
- Giancarlo Cecconi

Trap

- Angelo Scalzone
- Silvano Basagni

Skeet

- Romano Garagnani
- Carlo Alberto Lodi

== Swimming ==
Men's 100m Freestyle

- Roberto Pangaro
  - Heat — 54.74s (→ did not advance)

Men's 200m Freestyle

- Riccardo Targetti
  - Heat — 2:02.58 (→ did not advance)
- Arnaldo Cinquetti
  - Heat — 2:01.78 (→ did not advance)
- Roberto Pangaro
  - Heat — 2:00.97 (→ did not advance)

Men's 4 × 100 m Freestyle Relay

- Roberto Pangaro, Paolo Barelli, Marcello Guarducci and Alberto Castagnetti
  - Heat — 3:38.81 (→ did not advance)

Men's 4 × 200 m Freestyle Relay

- Roberto Pangaro, Arnaldo Cinquetti, Lorenzo Marugo, and Riccardo Targetti
  - Heat — 8:03.98 (→ did not advance)

Men's Competition

- Vincenzo Finocchiaro, Sergio Irredento, Massimo Nistri, Edmondo Mingione, Michele Di Pietro, Angelo Tozzi, Gaetano Carboni, and Mauro Calligaris. Reserve: Sandro Grassi.

Women's Competition

- Laura Podestà, Novella Calligaris, Federica Stabilini, Patrizia Miserini, Donatella Talpo, Patrizia Lanfredini, Laura Gorgerino, and Alessandra Finesso. Reserve: Antonella Valentini.

== Water polo ==
=== Men's team competition ===
- Preliminary Round (Group C)
  - Lost to Soviet Union (1-4)
  - Defeated Bulgaria (8-5)
  - Defeated Spain (6-2)
  - Defeated Japan (12-5)
- Final Round (Group I)
  - Lost to Hungary (7-8)
  - Drew with Yugoslavia (6-6)
  - Drew with West Germany (2-2)
  - Lost to United States (5-6) → Sixth place
- Team Roster
  - Alberto Alberani
  - Eraldo Pizzo
  - Roldano Simeoni
  - Mario Cevasco
  - Alessandro Ghibellini
  - Gianni de Magistris
  - Guglielmo Marsili
  - Silvio Baracchini
  - Franco Lavoratori
  - Sante Marsili
  - Ferdinande Ligano

== Weightlifting ==
Men's Bantamweight:

- Gaetano Tosto - 325.0 kg (→ 16th place)

Men's Featherweight:

- Peppino Tanti - 372.5 kg (→ 8th place)

Men's Middleweight:

- Anselmo Silvino - 470.0 kg (→ Bronze Medal)
- Salvatore Laudani - 440.0 kg (→ 11th place)

Men's Light Heavyweight:

- Dino Turcato - 455.0 (→ 9th place)

Men's Heavyweight:

- Roberto Vezzani - 545.0 (→ 5th place)

== Water Skiing (demonstration sports) ==
Men's Slalom:

- Roby Zucchi - 44.0 points (→ Gold Medal)

Men's Figure Skiing:

- Max Hofer - 3850 points (→ 6th place)
- Roby Zucchi - 3560 points (→ 8th place)

Men's Jump:

- Max Hofer - 37.70 points (→ Silver Medal)
- Roby Zucchi - 35.10 points (→ 7th place)
