= Swimming at the 1971 Mediterranean Games =

- Location: İzmir, Turkey

The swimming events of the 1971 Mediterranean Games were held in İzmir, Turkey.

== Medalists ==
=== Men's events ===
| Event | Gold | | Silver | | Bronze | |
|---|---|---|---|---|---|---|
| 100 m freestyle | Fabrizio Nardini (ITA) | 55.6 | Jorge Comas (ESP) | 56.0 | Roberto Pangaro (ITA) | 56.2 |
| 200 m freestyle | Arnaldo Cinquetti (ITA) | 2:03.0 | José Bas (ESP) | 2:03.8 | Riccardo Targetti (ITA) | 2:03.8 |
| 400 m freestyle | Antonio Corell (ESP) | 4:19.7 | Sandro Grassi (ITA) | 4:22.8 | Santiago Esteva (ESP) | 4:22.8 |
| 1500 m freestyle | José Bas (ESP) | 17:11.2 | Antonio Corell (ESP) | 17.11.3 | Vincenzo Finocchiaro (ITA) | 17:14.9 |
| 100 m backstroke | Nenad Miloš (YUG) | 1:01.9 | Santiago Esteva (ESP) | 1:01.9 | Predrag Miloš (YUG) | 1:02.6 |
| 200 m backstroke | Massimo Nistri (ITA) | 2:12.6 | Santiago Esteva (ESP) | 2:14.0 | Mauro Calligaris (ITA) | 2:18.3 |
| 100 m breaststroke | Andrea Daneri (ITA) | 1:11.0 | Pedro Balcells (ESP) | 1:11.5 | Theodoros Koutoumanis (GRE) | 1:13.3 |
| 200 m breaststroke | Pedro Balcells (ESP) | 2:35.1 | Andrea Daneri (ITA) | 2:36.5 | Mohsen El-Hussein (EGY) | 2:38.5 |
| 100 m butterfly | Arturo Lang-Lenton (ESP) | 1:00.3 | Aleksandar Pavličević (YUG) | 1:00.7 | Angelo Tozzi (ITA) | 1:01.1 |
| 200 m butterfly | Maurizio Castagna (ITA) | 2:11.9 | Arturo Lang-Lenton (ESP) | 2:17.2 | Angelo Tozzi (ITA) | 2:18.4 |
| 200 m medley | Michele D'Oppido (ITA) | 2:15.7 | José Ferrero (ESP) | 2:18.1 | Antonio Culebras (ESP) | 2:19.4 |
| 400 m medley | Lorenzo Marugo (ITA) | 4:57.2 | Mauro Calligaris (ITA) | 4:57.4 | José Ferrero (ESP) | 4:59.4 |
| 4 × 100 m freestyle | Spain (ESP); Jorge Comas; Antonio Culebras; Santiago Esteva; José Pujol | 3:41.9 | Italy (ITA); Alberto Castagnetti; Arnaldo Cinquetti; Fabrizio Nardini; Roberto Pangaro | 3:42.4 | Yugoslavia (YUG); Jovan Kovačić; Rene Lustig; Aleksandar Pavličević; Sandro Rudan | 3:50.2 |
| 4 × 200 m freestyle | Italy (ITA); Arnaldo Cinquetti; Sandro Grassi; Roberto Pangaro; Riccardo Targetti | 8:11.9 | Spain (ESP); José Bas; Santiago Esteva; José Pujol; Manuel Suárez | 8:14.6 | Yugoslavia (YUG); Jovan Kovačić; Aleksandar Pavličević; Veljko Rogošić; Sandro Rudan | 8:39.9 |
| 4 × 100 m medley | Spain (ESP); Pedro Balcells; Jorge Comas; Santiago Esteva; Arturo Lang-Lenton | 4:08.1 | Italy (ITA); Paolo Forti; Andrea Daneri; Fabrizio Nardini; Angelo Tozzi | 4:09.1 | Yugoslavia (YUG); Zdravko Divjak; Jovan Kovačić; Nenad Miloš; Aleksandar Pavličević | 4:13.9 |

=== Women's events ===
| Event | Gold | | Silver | | Bronze | |
|---|---|---|---|---|---|---|
| 100 m freestyle | Ana Boban (YUG) | 1:01.8 | Novella Calligaris (ITA) | 1:02.0 | Sahar Mansour (EGY) | 1:04.0 |
| 400 m freestyle | Novella Calligaris (ITA) | 4:37.2 | Susanna Sordelli (ITA) | 4:54.4 | Fatima Campos (ESP) | 5:02.8 |
| 100 m backstroke | Alessandra Finesso (ITA) | 1:11.3 | Emanuela Bassanese (ITA) | 1:12.2 | Herminia Jaqueti (ESP) | 1:13.9 |
| 100 m breaststroke | Patrizia Miserini (ITA) | 1:20.0 | Mairi Ioannidou (GRE) | 1:22.2 | Monserrat Carbo (ESP) | 1:23.5 |
| 100 m butterfly | Donatella Talpo (ITA) | 1:08.7 | Sahar Mansour (EGY) | 1:09.0 | Aurora Chamorro (ESP) | 1:10.4 |
| 200 m medley | Novella Calligaris (ITA) | 2:33.9 | Ana Boban (YUG) | 2:37.1 | Nieves Panadell (ESP) | 2:39.5 |
| 4 × 100 m freestyle | Italy (ITA); Novella Calligaris; Patrizia Pasetti; Laura Podestà; Susanna Sordelli | 4:17.4 | Spain (ESP); Aurora Chamorro; Nieves Panadell; Consuelo Permanyer; Maria Luisa Saavedra | 4:23.8 | Greece (GRE) | 4:34.8 |

== Medal table ==
| Rank | Nation | Gold | Silver | Bronze | Total |
|---|---|---|---|---|---|
| 1 | Italy (ITA) | 14 | 8 | 6 | 28 |
| 2 | Spain (ESP) | 6 | 10 | 8 | 24 |
| 3 | Yugoslavia (YUG) | 2 | 2 | 4 | 8 |
| 4 | Egypt (EGY) | 0 | 1 | 2 | 3 |
| 4 | Greece (GRE) | 0 | 1 | 2 | 3 |
| Totals (5 entries) | | 22 | 22 | 22 | 66 |
