= Spain at the 1976 Summer Olympics =

- IOC code: ESP
- NOC: Spanish Olympic Committee

in Montreal
- Competitors: 113 (103 men, 10 women) in 14 sports
- Flag bearer: Enrique Rodríguez
- Medals Ranked 30th: Gold 0 Silver 2 Bronze 0 Total 2

Summer Olympics appearances (overview)
- 1900; 1904–1912; 1920; 1924; 1928; 1932; 1936; 1948; 1952; 1956; 1960; 1964; 1968; 1972; 1976; 1980; 1984; 1988; 1992; 1996; 2000; 2004; 2008; 2012; 2016; 2020; 2024; 2028

Spain competed at the 1976 Summer Olympics in Montreal, Quebec, Canada. 113 competitors, 103 men and 10 women, took part in 68 events in 14 sports.

Juan Carlos I did not attend the Montreal Olympics in response of the African boycott of the games.

== Medalists ==
Medal	Name	Sport	Event	Date
Silver	Antonio Gorostegui; Pedro Luís Millet	Sailing	470	July 27
Silver	José María Esteban; José Ramón López; Herminio Menéndez; Luis Gregorio Ramos	Canoeing	Men's K-4 1000 m	July 31

Medals by sport
Sport	1st place, gold medalist(s)	2nd place, silver medalist(s)	3rd place, bronze medalist(s)	Total
Canoeing	0	1	0	1
Sailing	0	1	0	1
Total	0	2	0	2

== Athletics ==
Men's 800 metres

- Andrés Ballbé

- Heat — 1:48.38 (→ did not advance)

Men's 10.000 metres

- Mariano Haro

- Heat — 28:11.66
- Final — 28:00.28 (→ 6th place)

- José Luis Ruiz

- Heat — 31:03.43 (→ did not advance)

Men's 4 × 100 m Relay

- José Luis Sánchez Paraíso, Luis Sarriá, Francisco Javier García, and Javier Martínez

- Heat — 39.93
- Semi Final — DSQ (→ did not advance)

Men's Marathon

- Agustín Fernández — 2:28:37 (→ 46th place)
- Antonio Baños — 2:31:01 (→ 51st place)
- Santiago Manguan — did not finish (→ no ranking)

Men's High Jump

- Juan Carrasco

- Qualification — 2.05m (→ did not advance)

- Francisco Martín

- Qualification — 2.05m (→ did not advance)

Men's Long Jump

- Rafael Blanquer

- Qualification — 6.19m (→ did not advance)

Women's 800 metres

- Carmen Valero

- Heat — 2:06.14 (→ did not advance)

Women's 1500 metres

- Carmen Valero

- Heat — 4:17.65 (→ did not advance)

== Boxing ==
Men's Light Flyweight (– 48 kg)

- Enrique Rodríguez

- First Round – Lost to Serdamba Batsuk (MGL), RSC-3

Men's Flyweight (– 51 kg)

- Vicente Rodríguez

- First Round – Bye
- Second Round – Defeated Mbarek Zarrougui (MAR), RSC-2
- Third Round – Lost to Jong Jo-Ung (PRK), 2:3

Men's Bantamweight (– 54 kg)

- Juan Francisco Rodríguez

- First Round – Bye
- Second Round – Lost to Charles Mooney (USA), 1:4

Men's Lightweight (– 60 kg)

- Antonio Rubio

- First Round – Bye
- Second Round – Lost to Reinaldo Valiente (CUB), 0:5

Men's Light Welterweight (– 63.5 kg)

- José Manuel Gómet

- First Round – Lost to Narong Boonfuang (THA), KO-1

== Canoeing ==
Men's Competition

- Fernando Henríquez
- Guillermo Del Riego
- Herminio Menéndez
- José María Esteban
- José Ramón López
- José Seguín
- Luis Gregorio Ramos

== Cycling ==
Four cyclists represented Spain in 1976.

Individual road race

- Bernardo Alfonsel — 4:47:27 (→ 10th place)
- Rafael Ladrón — 4:49:01 (→ 32nd place)
- Juan José Moral — 4:49:01 (→ 33rd place)
- Paulino Martínez — did not finish (→ no ranking)

== Diving ==
- Carmen Belén Núñez
- Conchita García
- Ricardo Camacho

== Equestrian ==
- Alfonso Segovia
- Eduardo Amorós
- José María Rosillo
- Luis Álvarez de Cervera

== Football ==
=== Men's team competition ===
- Preliminary round (group A)

- Lost to Brazil (1-2)
- Lost to East Germany (0-1)

→ did not advance

- Team roster

- Alberto Vitoria
- Antonio Olmo
- Cundi
- Enrique Saura
- Esteban Vigo
- Francisco Javier Bermejo
- Francisco Sanjosé
- Isidoro San José
- Mariano Pulido
- José Vicente Sánchez
- Juan Castillo
- Juan Gómez
- Luis Arconada
- Miguel Mir
- Pedro Camus
- Santiago Idigoras

== Gymnastics ==
Men's Competition

- Fernando Bertrand
- Gabriel Calvo
- José de la Casa

Women's Competition

- Elisa Cabello
- Eloisa Marcos
- Mercedes Vernetta

== Hockey ==
=== Men's team competition ===
- Preliminary round (group B)

Pos	Team	Pld	W	D	L	GF	GA	GD	Pts	Qualification
1	Pakistan	4	3	1	0	16	6	+10	7	Semi-finals
2	New Zealand	4	1	2	1	6	8	−2	4 (Note: New Zealand and Spain finished on equal points at the conclusion of the pool stage, resulting in a match to determine second place in the pool. The match was contested on 26 July 1976 and New Zealand won 1–0.)	Semi-finals
3	Spain	4	1	2	1	9	7	+2	4	
4	West Germany	4	1	1	2	10	10	0	3	
5	Belgium	4	1	0	3	5	15	−10	2	
6	Kenya	0	0	0	0	0	0	0	0	Withdrew

Source: Olympedia
Notes:

- Defeated West Germany (4-1)
- Drew with Pakistan (2-2)
- Drew with New Zealand (1-1)
- Lost to Belgium (2-3)

- Play-Off Match Group B

- Lost to New Zealand (0-1, after extra time)

- Classification Matches

- 5th-8th place: Defeated Malaysia (2-1)
- 5th-6th place: Lost to West Germany (1-9) → 6th place

- Team roster

- Agustín Churruca
- Agustín Masana
- Francisco Codina
- Francisco Fábregas
- Francisco Segura
- Jaime Arbós
- Jorge Fábregas
- José Sallés
- Juan Amat
- Juan Arbós
- Juan Colomer
- Juan Pellón
- Luis Alberto Carrera
- Luis Twose
- Ramón Quintana
- Ricardo Cabot

- Head coach: Horst Wein

== Judo ==
Men's Competition

- José Luis de Frutos
- Juan Carlos Rodríguez

== Sailing ==
Men's Competition

- Alejandro Abascal
- Antonio Gorostegui
- Félix Anglada
- Félix Gancedo
- Humberto Costas
- Jesús Turró
- José Luís Doreste
- José María Benavides
- Juan Costas
- Pedro Luís Millet

== Shooting ==
Open

Athlete	Event	Final	
Athlete	Event	Points	Rank
Juan Ávalos	Skeet	194	7
Esteban Azcue	Trap	181	11
Enrique Camarena	Skeet	192	14
Luis del Cerro	50 m rifle prone	586	41
Jaime González	25 m rapid fire pistol	586	20
José María Pigrau	50 m rifle prone	584	51
Juan Segui	25 m rapid fire pistol	586	20
Eladio Vallduvi	Trap	175	21
José del Villar	50 m rifle three positions	1114	45

== Swimming ==
Men's Competition

- David López-Zubero
- Fernando Gómez-Reino
- Jesús Fuentes
- Jorge Comas
- José Bas
- Mario Lloret
- Miguel Lang
- Pedro Balcells
- Santiago Esteva

Women's Competition

- Antonia Real
- Magda Camps
- Montserrat Majo
- Rosa Estiarte
- Silvia Fontana

== Weightlifting ==
Men's Competition

- Angel Francisco
