= Swimming at the 1972 Summer Olympics – Men's 1500 metre freestyle =

Men's 1500 metre freestyle at the Games of the XX Olympiad
- Venue: Olympia Schwimmhalle
- Dates: 3 September 1972 (heats); 4 September 1972 (final)
- Competitors: 43 from 28 nations
- Winning time: 15:52.58 WR

Medalists
1st place, gold medalist(s)		Mike Burton	United States
2nd place, silver medalist(s)		Graham Windeatt	Australia
3rd place, bronze medalist(s)		Doug Northway	United States

The men's 1500 metre freestyle event at the 1972 Olympic Games took place between September 3 and 4. This swimming event used freestyle swimming, which means that the method of the stroke is not regulated (unlike backstroke, breaststroke, and butterfly events). Nearly all swimmers use the front crawl or a variant of that stroke. Because an Olympic-size swimming pool is 50 metres long, this race consisted of 30 lengths of the pool.

== Results ==
=== Heats ===
Heat 1

Rank	Athlete	Country	Time	Notes
1	Hans Faßnacht	West Germany	16:34.63	
2	Peter Rosenkranz	West Germany	16:58.26	
3	François Deley	Belgium	17:06.09	
4	Jim Carter	Great Britain	17:16.01	
5	Sergio Irredento	Italy	17:19.45	
6	Friðrik Guðmundsson	Iceland	17:32.47	
7	Edwin Borja	Philippines	18:12.17	

Heat 2

Rank	Athlete	Country	Time	Notes
1	Graham Windeatt	Australia	15:59.63	
2	Guillermo García	Mexico	16:29.48	
3	Anders Bellbring	Sweden	16:33.27	
4	Deane Buckboro	Canada	16:52.50	
5	Gerardo Vera	Venezuela	17:10.33	
6	Gustavo González	Argentina	17:23.53	

Heat 3

Rank	Athlete	Country	Time	Notes
1	Mike Burton	United States	16:09.56	
2	Graham White	Australia	16:19.63	
3	Brian Brinkley	Great Britain	16:54.39	
4	Alberto García	Mexico	17:05.68	
5	Jorge Jaramillo	Colombia	17:35.84	
6	Eugen Almer	Romania	17:49.80	

Heat 4

Rank	Athlete	Country	Time	Notes
1	Doug Northway	United States	16:15.30	
2	Mark Treffers	New Zealand	16:23.86	
3	Dusan Grozaj	West Germany	16:44.59	
4	Vincenzo Finocchiaro	Italy	17:13.42	
5	Tomas Becerra	Colombia	17:16.38	
6	Alfredo Carlos Machado	Brazil	17:20.34	
7	Guillermo Pacheco	Peru	17:36.36	
8	Dae Imlani	Philippines	17:37.65	

Heat 5

Rank	Athlete	Country	Time	Notes
1	Brad Cooper	Australia	16:11.41	
2	Bengt Gingsjö	Sweden	16:26.67	
3	Klaus Dockhorn	East Germany	16:55.30	
4	Jo O-ryeon	South Korea	17:29.23	
5	Aleksandr Samsonov	Soviet Union	17:32.88	
6	Kamal Kenawi Ali Moustafa	Egypt	17:40.37	
7	Neil Dexter	Great Britain	17:42.83	
8	Brian Clifford	Ireland	18:09.28	

Heat 6

Rank	Athlete	Country	Time	Notes
1	Ton van Klooster	Netherlands	16:34.77	
2	Axel Freudenberg	East Germany	16:37.19	
3	Zoltán Verrasztó	Hungary	17:18.66	
4	Władysław Wojtakajtis	Poland	17:23.47	
5	Christoph Kreienbühl	Switzerland	17:27.67	
6	Csaba Sós	Hungary	17:43.97	
AC	Dimitrios Theodoropoulos	Greece	16:17.61	DQ
AC	Rick DeMont	United States	18:15.90	DQ

=== Final ===
Rank	Athlete	Country	Time	Notes
1	Mike Burton	United States	15:52.58	WR
2	Graham Windeatt	Australia	15:58.48	
3	Doug Northway	United States	16:09.25	
4	Bengt Gingsjö	Sweden	16:16.01	
5	Graham White	Australia	16:17.22	
6	Mark Treffers	New Zealand	16:18.84	
7	Brad Cooper	Australia	16:30.49	
8	Guillermo García	Mexico	16:36.03	

Key: WR = World record
