= Swimming at the 1975 Mediterranean Games =

- Location: Algiers, Algeria

The swimming competition at the 1975 Mediterranean Games was held in Algiers, Algeria.

== Medallists ==
=== Men's events ===
Event	Gold		Silver		Bronze	
100 m freestyle	Marcello Guarducci (ITA)	53.07	Jorge Comas (ESP)	54.20	Ahmed Ali Djaber (EGY)	54.36
200 m freestyle	Marcello Guarducci (ITA)	1:57.55	Sandro Rudan (YUG)	2:00.48	Roberto Pangaro (ITA)	2:00.53
400 m freestyle	Ali Gharbi (TUN)	4:08.05	Marc Lazzaro (FRA)	4:08.82	José Bas (ESP)	4:09.38
1500 m freestyle	José Bas (ESP)	16:27.01	Sergio Affronte (ITA)	16:28.55	Ali Gharbi (TUN)	16:30.57
100 m backstroke	Santiago Esteva (ESP)	1:00.20	Predrag Miloš (YUG)	1:01.44	Nenad Miloš (YUG)	1:02.02
200 m backstroke	Santiago Esteva (ESP)	2:08.21	Predrag Miloš (YUG)	2:10.30	Lionel Beylot-Bourcelot (FRA)	2:11.75
100 m breaststroke	Giorgio Lalle (ITA)	1:06.16	Bernard Combet (FRA)	1:06.24	Pedro Balcells (ESP)	1:08.76
200 m breaststroke	Giorgio Lalle (ITA)	2:27.38	Pedro Balcells (ESP)	2:28.68	Giancarlo Mauro (ITA)	2:29.65
100 m butterfly	Paolo Barelli (ITA)	58.10	José Bonet (ESP)	58.57	Christian Calabuig (FRA)	59.30
200 m butterfly	Alessandro Griffith (ITA)	2:09.36	Ramon Duch (ESP)	2:09.77	Patrice Ravelinghien (FRA)	2:12.33
200 m individual medley	Santiago Esteva (ESP)	2:12.12	Lorenzo Marugo (ITA)	2:14.30	David Lopez Zubero (ESP)	2:14.33
400 m individual medley	Lorenzo Marugo (ITA)	4:46.24	José Bas (ESP)	4:50.99	Ramon Duch (ESP)	4:51.19
4 × 100 m freestyle	Italy	3:36.79	Spain	3:37.36	Yugoslavia	3:41.42
4 × 200 m freestyle	Italy	7:57.24	Spain	8:03.44	France	8:09.71
4 × 100 m medley	Spain	3:59.46	Italy	4:00.04	France	4:00.28

=== Women's events ===
Event	Gold		Silver		Bronze	
100 m freestyle	Caroline Carpentier (FRA)	1:01.36	Myriam Mizouni (TUN)	1:02.25	Elisabetta Dessy (ITA)	1:02.57
400 m freestyle	Giuditta Pandini (ITA)	4:34.45	Christine Duperron (FRA)	4:37.37	Patricia Zebellin (ITA)	4:40.29
100 m backstroke	Sylvie Testuz (FRA)	1:08.88	Paola Cesari (ITA)	1:08.89	Silvia Fontana (ESP)	1:10.83
100 m breaststroke	Mariane Zeppa (FRA)	1:17.84	Iris Corniani (ITA)	1:18.16	Vinj Petrovic (YUG)	1:20.22
100 m butterfly	Cinzia Rampazzo (ITA)	1:06.72	Donatella Schiavon (ITA)	1:07.02	Montserrat Majo (ESP)	1:07.40
4 × 100 m freestyle relay	Italy	4:11.16	France	4:12.80	Spain	4:15.50

== Medal table ==
Rank	Nation	Gold	Silver	Bronze	Total
1	Italy	12	6	4	22
2	Spain	5	7	7	19
3	France	3	4	5	12
4	Tunisia	1	1	1	3
5	Yugoslavia	0	3	3	6
6	Egypt	0	0	1	1
Totals (6 entries)		21	21	21	63
