= Swimming at the 1973 World Aquatics Championships – Men's 1500 metre freestyle =

Men's 1500 metre freestyle at the 1973 World Aquatics Championships
- Dates: September 8, 1973
- Winning time: 15:31.85 WR

Medalists
gold medal	Stephen Holland	Australia
silver medal	Rick DeMont	United States
bronze medal	Brad Cooper	Australia

The men's 1500 metre freestyle competition of the swimming events at the 1973 World Aquatics Championships took place on September 8.

== Records ==
Prior to the competition, the existing world and championship records were as follows.

World record	Stephen Holland (AUS)	15:37.80	Brisbane, Australia	5 August 1973
Competition record	N/A	N/A	N/A	N/A

The following records were established during the competition:

Date	Event	Name	Nationality	Time	Record
8 September	Timed Final	François Deley	Belgium	16:41.53	CR
8 September	Timed Final	Hakon Iverson	Norway	16:28.49	CR
8 September	Timed Final	Stephen Holland	Australia	15:31.85	WR

== Results ==
26 swimmers participated in 4 heats. The event was a timed final. The first three heats were contested in the morning with the fourth and final heat contested in the evening.

Rank	Heat	Lane	Name	Nationality	Time	Notes
1st place, gold medalist(s)	4	-	Stephen Holland	Australia	15:31.85	WR
2nd place, silver medalist(s)	4	-	Rick DeMont	United States	15:35.44	
3rd place, bronze medalist(s)	4	-	Brad Cooper	Australia	15:45.04	
4	4	-	John Kinsella	United States	15:58.70	
5	4	-	Bengt Gingsjö	Sweden	16:06.01	
6	4	-	Mark Treffers	New Zealand	16:09.33	
7	4	-	Anders Bellbring	Sweden	16:12.01	
8	4	-	Valentin Parinov	Soviet Union	16:18.24	
9	2	-	Hakon Iverson	Norway	16:28.49	CR
10	3	-	Andreas Meier	East Germany	16:28.78	
11	3	-	G. Castillo	Mexico	16:31.74	
12	3	-	Klaus Dockhorn	East Germany	16:32.00	
13	1	-	François Deley	Belgium	16:41.53	CR
14	2	-	Csaba Tóth	Hungary	16:44.36	
15	3	-	José Bas	Spain	16:55.70	
16	2	-	Deane Buckboro	Canada	16:55.79	
17	3	-	Michael Ker	Canada	17:00.62	
18	2	-	Hans-Joachim Geisler	West Germany	17:04.23	
19	3	-	Marc Lazzaro	France	17:08.52	
20	3	-	Dusan Grozaj	West Germany	17:09.15	
21	2	-	Vladimir Kobelev	Soviet Union	17:09.54	
22	2	-	Luis Reinaldo Fleck	Brazil	17:11.62	
23	1	-	Krasimir Enchev	Bulgaria	17:18.01	
24	1	-	Fernando Cañales	Puerto Rico	17:43.21	
25	1	-	Alberto Vivoni	Puerto Rico	17:53.29	
26	2	-	Eugen Almer	Romania	21:40.70	
–	1	-	L. Díaz	Argentina	Did not start	
–	1	-	Ali Kinawi	Egypt	Did not start	
–	3	-	Thierry Lalot	France	Did not start	
