= Swimming at the 1972 Summer Olympics – Men's 400 metre freestyle =

Men's 400 metre freestyle at the Games of the XX Olympiad
- Venue: Olympia Schwimmhalle
- Dates: 1 September 1972 (heats & final)
- Competitors: 43 from 28 nations
- Winning time: 4:00.27 OR

Medalists
1st place, gold medalist(s)		Brad Cooper	Australia
2nd place, silver medalist(s)		Steve Genter	United States
3rd place, bronze medalist(s)		Tom McBreen	United States

The men's 400 metre freestyle event at the 1972 Olympic Games took place 1 September. This swimming event used freestyle swimming, which means that the method of the stroke is not regulated (unlike backstroke, breaststroke, and butterfly events). Nearly all swimmers use the front crawl or a variant of that stroke. Because an Olympic size swimming pool is 50 metres long, this race consisted of eight lengths of the pool.

Rick DeMont of the United States originally won the gold medal in 4:00.26. Following the race, the International Olympic Committee (IOC) stripped DeMont of his gold medal after his post-race urinalysis tested positive for traces of the banned substance ephedrine contained in his prescription asthma medication, Marax. The positive test following the 400-meter freestyle final also deprived him of a chance at multiple medals, as he was not permitted to swim in any other events at the 1972 Olympics, including the 1,500-meter freestyle for which he was the then-current world record-holder. Before the Olympics, DeMont had properly declared his asthma medications on his medical disclosure forms, but the U.S. Olympic Committee (USOC) had not cleared them with the IOC's medical committee. The United States Olympic Committee (USOC) has recognized his gold medal performance in the 1972 Summer Olympics in 2001, but only the IOC has the power to restore his rankings, and it has not done so.

== Results ==
=== Heats ===
Heat 1

Rank	Athlete	Country	Time	Notes
1	Gunnar Larsson	Sweden	4:09.88	
2	Ton van Klooster	Netherlands	4:11.72	
3	Guillermo García	Mexico	4:15.33	
4	Alain Charmey	Switzerland	4:18.25	
5	Bruce Robertson	Canada	4:20.31	
6	Neil Dexter	Great Britain	4:24.80	
7	Kamal Kenawi Ali Moustafa	Egypt	4:24.97	

Heat 2

Rank	Athlete	Country	Time	Notes
1	Bengt Gingsjö	Sweden	4:06.59	OR, Q
2	Hans Fassnacht	West Germany	4:09.23	
3	Udo Poser	East Germany	4:09.62	
4	Peter Rosenkranz	West Germany	4:14.01	
5	Tomás Becerra	Colombia	4:20.78	
6	Dae Imlani	Philippines	4:24.01	
7	Dimitrios Theodoropoulos	Greece	4:30.54	

Heat 3

Rank	Athlete	Country	Time	Notes
1	Steve Genter	United States	4:05.89	OR, Q
2	Anders Bellbring	Sweden	4:08.38	
3	Aleksandr Samsonov	Soviet Union	4:11.46	
4	Wolfram Sperling	East Germany	4:14.73	
5	Sverre Kile	Norway	4:20.86	
6	José Luis Prado	Mexico	4:22.31	
7	Friðrik Guðmundsson	Iceland	4:26.25	

Heat 4

Rank	Athlete	Country	Time	Notes
1	Brad Cooper	Australia	4:04.59	OR, Q
2	Werner Lampe	West Germany	4:04.80	Q
3	Ralph Hutton	Canada	4:09.27	
4	Władysław Wojtakajtis	Poland	4:16.04	
5	Alfredo Machado	Brazil	4:18.05	
6	Arnaldo Cinquetti	Italy	4:19.49	
7	Gustavo González	Argentina	4:21.22	

Heat 5

Rank	Athlete	Country	Time	Notes
1	Rick DeMont	United States	4:05.70	Q
2	Graham Windeatt	Australia	4:05.92	Q
3	Gerardo Vera	Venezuela	4:11.37	
4	Jorge Delgado	Ecuador	4:12.29	
5	Mark Treffers	New Zealand	4:14.10	
6	Antonio Corell	Spain	4:17.81	
7	Jo O-ryeon	South Korea	4:21.78	

Heat 6

Rank	Athlete	Country	Time	Notes
1	Tom McBreen	United States	4:06.09	Q
2	Brian Brinkley	Great Britain	4:06.44	Q
3	Graham White	Australia	4:08.29	
4	Ron Jacks	Canada	4:16.08	
5	Viktor Aboimov	Soviet Union	4:17.04	
6	Klaus Dockhorn	East Germany	4:17.98	
7	Guillermo Pacheco	Peru	4:18.78	
8	François Deley	Belgium	4:24.73	

=== Final ===
Rank	Athlete	Country	Time	Notes
1	Brad Cooper	Australia	4:00.27	OR
2	Steve Genter	United States	4:01.94	
3	Tom McBreen	United States	4:02.64	
4	Graham Windeatt	Australia	4:02.93	
5	Brian Brinkley	Great Britain	4:06.69	
6	Bengt Gingsjö	Sweden	4:06.75	
7	Werner Lampe	West Germany	4:06.97	
	Rick DeMont	United States	4:00.26	DSQ

Key: DSQ = Disqualified, OR = Olympic record
