= Swimming at the 1972 Summer Olympics – Men's 200 metre freestyle =

Men's 200 metre freestyle at the Games of the XX Olympiad
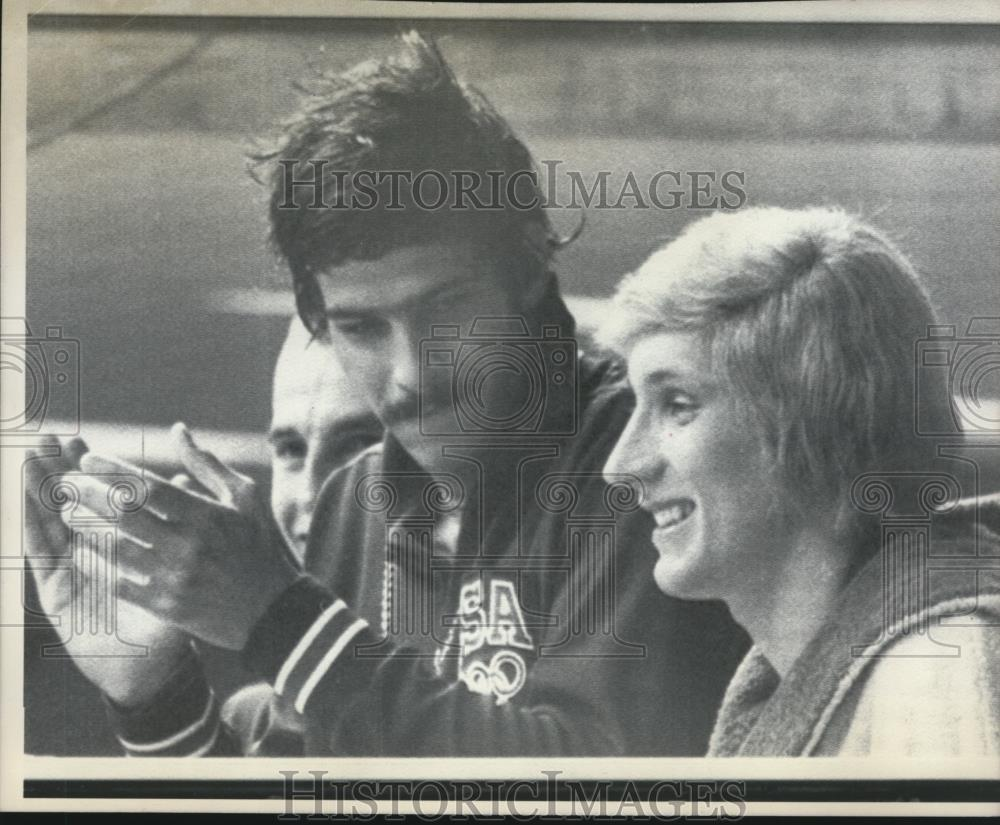
- The medalists on the podium
- Venue: Olympia Schwimmhalle
- Date: 29 August 1972 (heats & final)
- Competitors: 46 from 27 nations
- Winning time: 1:52.78 WR

Medalists
| 1st place, gold medalist(s) | | Mark Spitz | United States |
| 2nd place, silver medalist(s) | | Steve Genter | United States |
| 3rd place, bronze medalist(s) | | Werner Lampe | West Germany |

The men's 200 metre freestyle event at the 1972 Summer Olympics took place on August 29 at the Olympia Schwimmhalle. There were 46 competitors from 27 nations, with each nation having up to three swimmers. The event was won by Mark Spitz of the United States, the nation's second victory in the event (68 years, but only two appearances of the event, apart). It was the third gold medal for Spitz in 1972, halfway to his goal of six (he would ultimately finish the Games with seven). His teammate Steve Genter took silver, with Werner Lampe of West Germany earning bronze. Defending champion Michael Wenden of Australia finished fourth.

== Background ==
This was the fourth appearance of the 200 metre freestyle event. It was first contested in 1900. It would be contested a second time, though at 220 yards, in 1904. After that, the event did not return until 1968; since then, it has been on the programme at every Summer Games.

Two of the 8 finalists from the 1968 Games returned: gold medalist Michael Wenden of Australia and fourth-place finisher Ralph Hutton of Canada. Mark Spitz was the world record holder and a heavy favourite coming into the Games, aiming for at least six gold medals. He had won the 200 fly and 4x100 free relay the day before this event. His biggest challenger was countryman Steve Genter, though Genter was hampered by pneumothorax while in Munich.

Brazil, Cambodia (then Khmer Republic), East Germany, Egypt, Iceland, Kuwait, Mexico, New Zealand, Romania, Venezuela, and Yugoslavia each made their debut in the event. Australia and the United States made their fourth appearance each, the only two nations to have competed in all prior editions of the event.

== Competition format ==
The competition used a two-round (heats, final) format. The advancement rule followed the format introduced in 1952. A swimmer's place in the heat was not used to determine advancement; instead, the fastest times from across all heats in a round were used. There were 7 heats of between 5 and 8 swimmers each. The top 8 swimmers advanced to the final. Swim-offs were used as necessary to break ties.

This swimming event used freestyle swimming, which means that the method of the stroke is not regulated (unlike backstroke, breaststroke, and butterfly events). Nearly all swimmers use the front crawl or a variant of that stroke. Because an Olympic-size swimming pool is 50 metres long, this race consisted of four lengths of the pool.

== Records ==
The standing world and Olympic records prior to this competition were as follows. Clark's Olympic record was set as the first leg in the 4 × 200 metre freestyle relay final.

| World record | Mark Spitz (USA) | 1:53.5 | Minsk, Soviet Union | 10 September 1971 |
| Olympic record | Michael Wenden (AUS) | 1:55.2 | Mexico City, Mexico | 24 October 1968 |

Mark Spitz beat his own world record in the final, swimming 1:52.78.

== Schedule ==
All times are Central European Time (UTC+1)

| Date | Time | Round |
|---|---|---|
| Tuesday, 29 August 1972 | 10:00; 18:40 | Heats; Final |

== Results ==
=== Heats ===
The 8 fastest swimmers from the seven heats, without regard to place in heat, advanced to final.

| Rank | Heat | Swimmer | Nation | Time | Notes |
|---|---|---|---|---|---|
| 1 | 7 | Mark Spitz | United States | 1:55.29 | Q |
| 2 | 6 | Steve Genter | United States | 1:55.42 | Q |
| 3 | 4 | Klaus Steinbach | West Germany | 1:55.80 | Q |
| 4 | 3 | Werner Lampe | West Germany | 1:55.97 | Q |
| 5 | 5 | Fred Tyler | United States | 1:56.04 | Q |
| 6 | 2 | Vladimir Bure | Soviet Union | 1:56.15 | Q |
| 7 | 1 | Mike Wenden | Australia | 1:56.66 | Q |
| 8 | 7 | Ralph Hutton | Canada | 1:56.84 | Q |
| 9 | 4 | Wilfried Hartung | East Germany | 1:56.95 | |
| 10 | 6 | Brian Brinkley | Great Britain | 1:56.99 | |
| 11 | 2 | Georgijs Kuļikovs | Soviet Union | 1:57.04 | |
| 12 | 7 | Udo Poser | East Germany | 1:57.23 | |
| 13 | 4 | Gerardo Vera | Venezuela | 1:57.33 | |
| 14 | 1 | Robert Nay | Australia | 1:57.69 | |
| 15 | 1 | Viktor Mazanov | Soviet Union | 1:57.92 | |
| 16 | 5 | Peter Bruch | East Germany | 1:58.49 | |
| 17 | 3 | Graham White | Australia | 1:58.60 | |
| 18 | 6 | Peter Prijdekker | Netherlands | 1:58.78 | |
| 19 | 5 | Bruce Robertson | Canada | 1:59.02 | |
| 20 | 1 | Hans Ljungberg | Sweden | 1:59.42 | |
| 21 | 7 | Rolf Pettersson | Sweden | 2:00.02 | |
| 22 | 1 | Alfredo Machado | Brazil | 2:00.14 | |
| 23 | 3 | John Mills | Great Britain | 2:00.17 | |
| 24 | 5 | Marian Slavic | Romania | 2:00.23 | |
| 25 | 4 | Olaf, Baron von Schilling | West Germany | 2:00.27 | |
| 26 | 5 | Colin Herring | New Zealand | 2:00.29 | |
| 27 | 6 | Ruy de Oliveira | Brazil | 2:00.48 | |
| 28 | 2 | Pierre Caland | France | 2:00.75 | |
| 29 | 2 | Michael Bailey | Great Britain | 2:00.79 | |
| 30 | 6 | Roberto Pangaro | Italy | 2:00.97 | |
| 31 | 3 | Fritz Warncke | Norway | 2:00.98 | |
| 32 | 5 | Ian MacKenzie | Canada | 2:01.22 | |
| 33 | 2 | Zbigniew Pacelt | Poland | 2:01.28 | |
| 34 | 4 | Bernt Zarnowiecki | Sweden | 2:01.34 | |
| 35 | 2 | Arnaldo Cinquetti | Italy | 2:01.78 | |
| 36 | 4 | Riccardo Targetti | Italy | 2:02.58 | |
| 37 | 5 | Hanspeter Würmli | Switzerland | 2:03.14 | |
| 38 | 5 | Roberto Strauss | Mexico | 2:03.57 | |
| 39 | 3 | Kamal Kenawi Ali Moustafa | Egypt | 2:05.30 | |
| 40 | 6 | Sandro Rudan | Yugoslavia | 2:05.88 | |
| 41 | 3 | Luis Ayesa | Philippines | 2:05.97 | |
| 42 | 6 | Tomás Rengifo | El Salvador | 2:08.67 | |
| 43 | 6 | Finnur Garðarsson | Iceland | 2:08.88 | |
| 44 | 7 | Mark Crocker | Hong Kong | 2:12.85 | |
| 45 | 7 | Samnang Prak | Khmer Republic | 2:13.34 | |
| 46 | 4 | Fawzi Burhma | Kuwait | 2:33.75 | |

=== Final ===
Spitz led at the first turn, followed by Bure. Genter, still recovering from his collapsed lung, took the lead at the halfway mark by .13 seconds (54.93 to 55.06 for Spitz). Genter held the lead through the final turn at 150 metres. Wenden, the defending champion, worked his way up to third by that mark. Spitz finished strong to win by a full second over Genter. Lampe also finished strong, beating Wenden for bronze.

| Rank | Swimmer | Nation | Time | Notes |
|---|---|---|---|---|
| 1st place, gold medalist(s) | Mark Spitz | United States | 1:52.78 | WR |
| 2nd place, silver medalist(s) | Steve Genter | United States | 1:53.73 | |
| 3rd place, bronze medalist(s) | Werner Lampe | West Germany | 1:53.99 | |
| 4 | Mike Wenden | Australia | 1:54.40 | |
| 5 | Fred Tyler | United States | 1:54.96 | |
| 6 | Klaus Steinbach | West Germany | 1:55.65 | |
| 7 | Vladimir Bure | Soviet Union | 1:57.24 | |
| 8 | Ralph Hutton | Canada | 1:57.56 | |
