= Swimming at the 1972 Summer Olympics – Men's 200 metre butterfly =

Men's 200 metre butterfly at the Games of the XX Olympiad
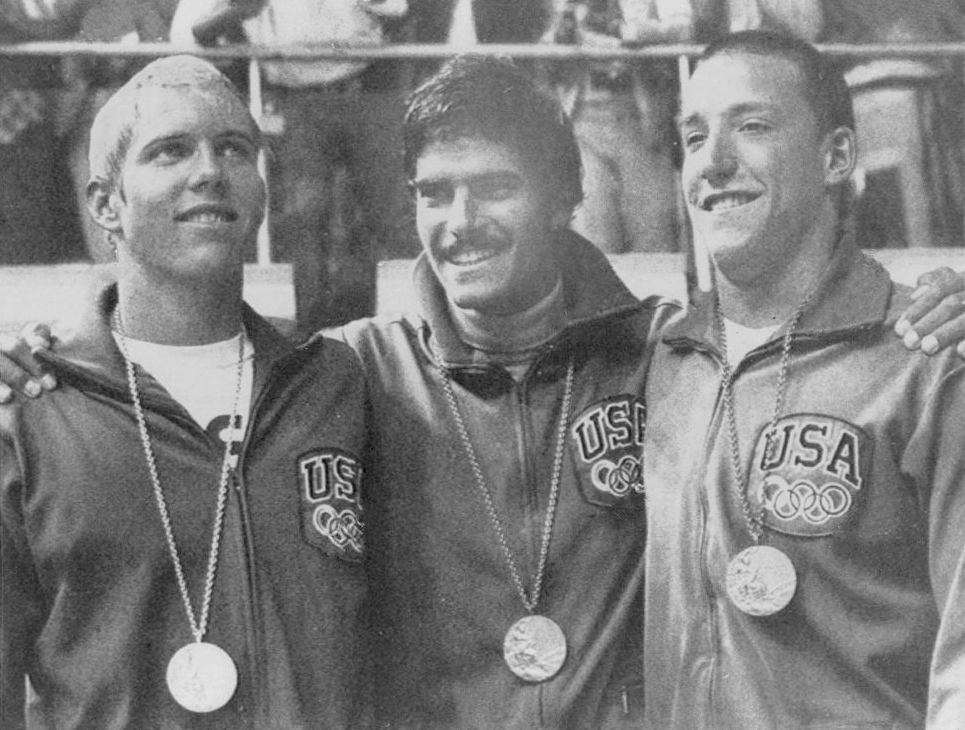
- Left-right:Hall, Spitz, Backhaus
- Venue: Olympia Schwimmhalle
- Dates: 28 August 1972 (heats & final)
- Competitors: 30 from 20 nations
- Winning time: 2:00.70 WR

Medalists
1st place, gold medalist(s)		Mark Spitz	United States
2nd place, silver medalist(s)		Gary Hall, Sr.	United States
3rd place, bronze medalist(s)		Robin Backhaus	United States

The men's 200 metre butterfly event at the 1972 Olympic Games took place August 28. This swimming event used the butterfly stroke. Because an Olympic-size swimming pool is 50 metres long, this race consisted of four lengths of the pool.

== Results ==
=== Heats ===
Heat 1

Rank	Athlete	Country	Time	Notes
1	Gary Hall, Sr.	United States	2:03.70	OR, Q
2	András Hargitay	Hungary	2:05.05	Q
3	Roger Pyttel	East Germany	2:08.72	
4	Sean Maher	Great Britain	2:09.39	
5	Jorge Jaramillo	Colombia	2:10.24	
6	Walter Mack	West Germany	2:11.03	
7	Vasil Dobrev	Bulgaria	2:11.28	

Key: OR = Olympic record, Q = Qualified

Heat 2

Rank	Athlete	Country	Time	Notes
1	Robin Backhaus	United States	2:03.11	OR, Q
2	Folkert Meeuw	West Germany	2:06.13	Q
3	Yasuhiro Komazaki	Japan	2:08.72	
4	Hugo Valencia	Mexico	2:09.56	
5	Andrzej Chudziński	Poland	2:12.62	
6	Geoffrey Ferreira	Trinidad and Tobago	2:19.76	
	Angelo Tozzi	Italy	2:10.82	DQ

Key: DQ = Disqualified, OR = Olympic record, Q = Qualified

Heat 3

Rank	Athlete	Country	Time	Notes
1	Hans Fassnacht	West Germany	2:05.39	Q
2	Jorge Delgado, Jr.	Ecuador	2:05.61	Q
3	Viktor Sharygin	Soviet Union	2:06.76	
4	James Findlay	Australia	2:08.36	
5	Ron Jacks	Canada	2:09.04	
6	Ricardo Marmolejo	Mexico	2:10.00	
7	Jacques Leloup	Belgium	2:10.79	
8	Roy Chan	Singapore	2:20.30	

Key: Q = Qualified

Heat 4

Rank	Athlete	Country	Time	Notes
1	Mark Spitz	United States	2:02.11	OR, Q
2	Hartmut Flöckner	East Germany	2:05.54	Q
3	John Mills	Great Britain	2:06.58	
4	Brian Brinkley	Great Britain	2:06.82	
5	Byron MacDonald	Canada	2:12.12	
6	Gaetano Carboni	Italy	2:12.16	
7	Hsu Tung-Hsiung	Chinese Taipei	2:16.35	
8	Carlos Singson	Philippines	2:23.70	

Key: OR = Olympic record, Q = Qualified

=== Final ===
Rank	Athlete	Country	Time	Notes
1	Mark Spitz	United States	2:00.70	WR
2	Gary Hall, Sr.	United States	2:02.86	
3	Robin Backhaus	United States	2:03.23	
4	Jorge Delgado, Jr.	Ecuador	2:04.60	
5	Hans Fassnacht	West Germany	2:04.69	
6	András Hargitay	Hungary	2:04.69	
7	Hartmut Flöckner	East Germany	2:05.34	
8	Folkert Meeuw	West Germany	2:05.57	

Key: WR = World record
