= Sport in Yugoslavia =

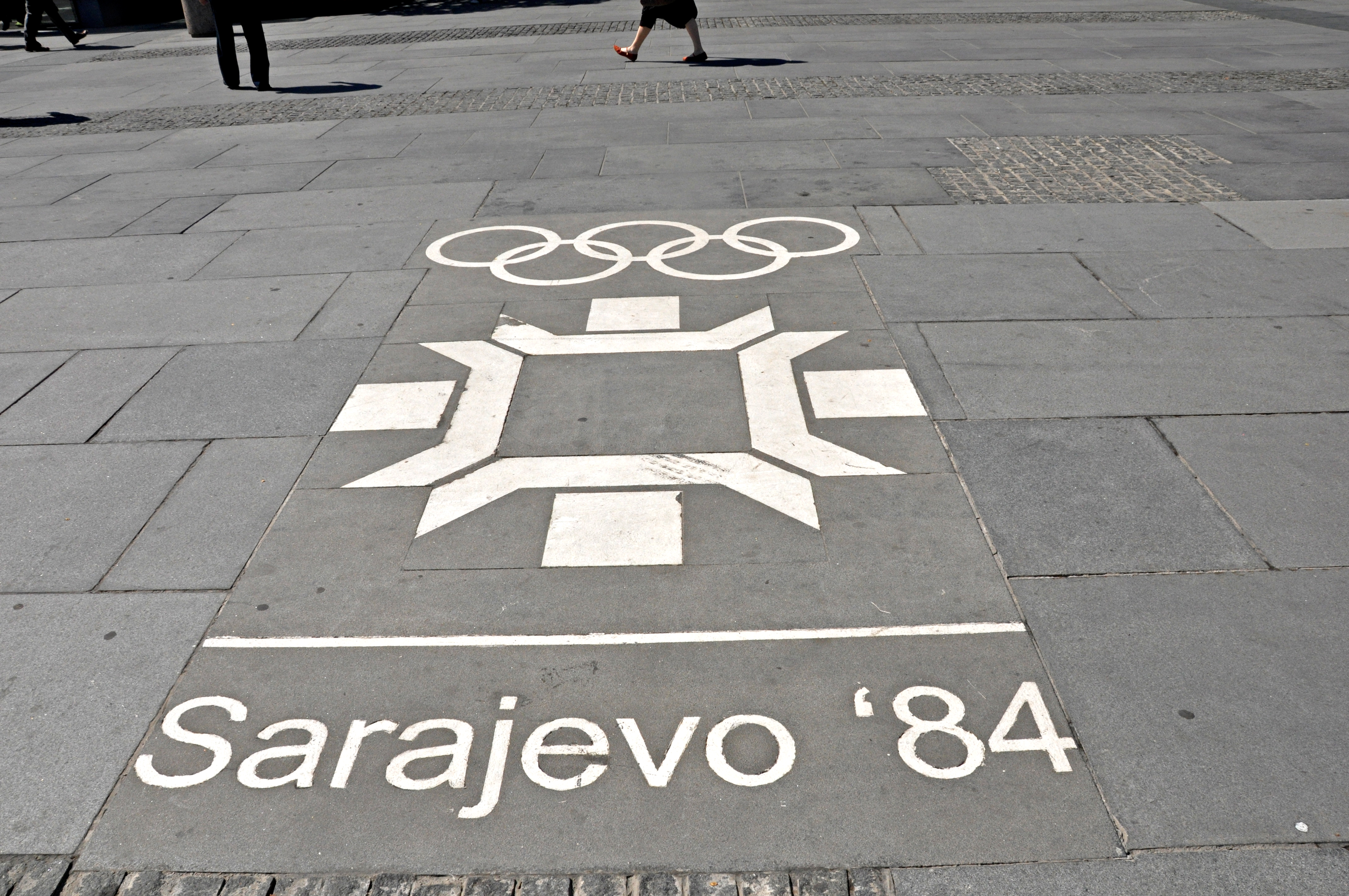
The 1984 Winter Olympics were held in Sarajevo.

Sport in Yugoslavia had a significant role in its culture and society. Team sports such as football, basketball, handball, volleyball and water polo had the biggest popularity. Of individual sports the most popular were tennis, athletics, alpine skiing, swimming, table tennis, ski jumping and chess. Yugoslavia made its debut at the Summer Olympics in 1920. Until its break up in 1992, it competed in 16 Summer and 14 Winter Olympic games and won a total of 87 medals in various summer and winter sports. Yugoslavia hosted its first and the only Winter Olympic games in 1984 in Sarajevo when Jure Franko won his country's first Winter Olympic medal, silver in alpine skiing.

== Olympic Games ==
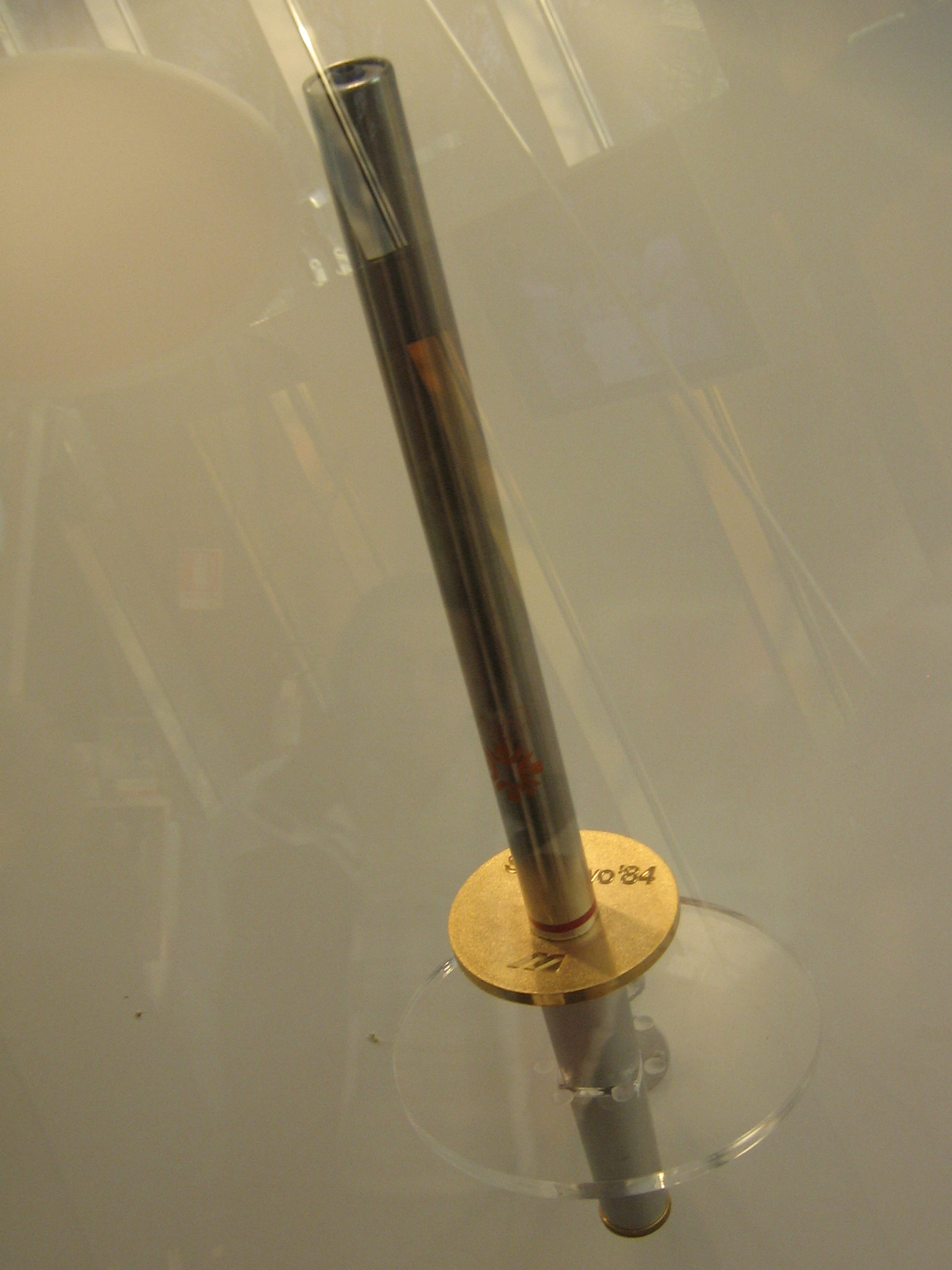
The 1984 Winter Olympic torch

Yugoslavia for the first time participated at the 1920 Summer Olympic Games. Until its break up in 1992, country won a total of 83 medals, 26 gold, 29 silver and 28 bronze. The most medals are won in gymnastics, wrestling and water polo. Yugoslavia hosted the 1984 Winter Olympics in Sarajevo when Jure Franko won his country's first Winter Olympic medal, silver in alpine skiing. Three more medals are won at Winter Games, all in alpine skiing and ski jumping.

== Football ==
Football was the most popular sport in Yugoslavia. Its popularity started in the time of Austria-Hungary late 19th century, mostly influenced by Vienna, Budapest and Prague, and first football club was established in Belgrade in 1899. After the World War I Yugoslav Football Federation was formed in Kingdom of Yugoslavia and Yugoslav Football Championship was played since 1923. The most successful clubs in the first period were those from Belgrade and Zagreb, BSK. Jugoslavija, Građanski, HAŠK, Concordia, and Hajduk from Split.

After World War II and Socialist Yugoslavia many new clubs were formed and new federal league was established to replace old championship. It soon became the most popular sport league in the country with average attendance usually over 10.000 spectators. The most successful clubs were known as the big four, Dinamo Zagreb, Hajduk Split, Red Star Belgrade and Partizan Belgrade. Dinamo won Inter-Cities Fairs Cup in 1967, Red Star won European Cup in 1991, while Partizan were runners-up of the same competition in 1966.

Yugoslavia national football team was formed in 1920, when it participated at the Summer Olympics in Belgium. Yugoslavia became a force in European and World football, being regular participant at European Championships and World Cups. They finished third in 1930 World Cup and played in semi finals in 1962. They also played in semi-finals of UEFA Euro 1976, hosted in home cities of Belgrade and Zagreb.

== Basketball ==
Basketball was another very popular sport in Yugoslavia. It developed after the World War II with the influence from Soviet Union, which later became a fierce rival. Yugoslavia national basketball team developed into one of the world's best teams, becoming three times World Champions and five times European Champions.

Yugoslav First Federal Basketball League was also very strong and the most successful teams were Crvena Zvezda with 12 and Olimpija, Zadar and Jugoplastika with 6 titles each. Yugoslav Basketball Cup was introduced in 1959 and the best club there was Cibona with 8 titles. Jugoplastika, Cibona, Partizan and Bosna all won European Champions Cup.

Yugoslavia hosted World Championship in 1970 and Eurobasket in 1961, 1975 and 1989.

== Handball ==
Handball had a long tradition in Yugoslavia. Women's Czech handball with its own leagues was played since 1920 until the late 1930s. In northern parts of the country field handball was introduced in 1929, but found bigger popularity only after the World War II. It was later replaced by team handball, which became one of the most popular team sports in the country. Yugoslavia national handball team became two times Olympic and one time World Champions.

Yugoslav Handball Championship was played from 1953 and the most successful club was Partizan Bjelovar with 9 titles, followed by Borac Banja Luka and Metaloplastika Šabac with 7 titles each. Those clubs were also champions of European Champions Cup, Partizan one time, Metaloplastika two times and Borac one time.

== Water polo ==
Water polo was the most successful Yugoslavian team sport at the Olympic games. National team was a total of three times Olympic champion (in 1968, 1984 and 1988) and four times runner-up (in 1952, 1956, 1964 and 1980). They were also twice World champions, once European champions and two times champions of water polo World cup.

Yugoslavian clubs were also very successful at the European competitions. Water polo teams from Yugoslavia won thirteen times Champions League and six times Cup Winners' Cup. Among the most notable teams are VK Partizan, HAVK Mladost and VK Jug Dubrovnik. Yugoslav Water Polo Championship was held between 1921 and 1991, Cup between 1972 and 1991 and Winter Championship between 1959 and 1972.

Yugoslavia hosted World Championship in 1973 in Belgrade, European Championship in 1981 in Split and World Cup in 1979 in Belgrade and Rijeka.

== Tennis ==
Mima Jaušovec won the first Yugoslavian Grand Slam, French Open in 1977. The most successful Yugoslavian tennis player is Monica Seles, former world number one player. In 1990, at the age of 16, Seles became the youngest-ever French Open champion. In her rich career, she won total of 9 Grand Slam singles titles, making her one of the best female players ever. Sabrina Goleš won silver medal at the 1984 Summer Olympics when the tennis was demonstration sport. Yugoslavia Fed Cup team reached the semi-finals in 1984.

The most notable Yugoslavian male tennis players are Željko Franulović, Nikola Pilić, Slobodan Živojinović, Dragutin Mitić, Boro Jovanović, Franjo Punčec, Nikola Špear, Josip Palada, Goran Prpić and Goran Ivanišević. Yugoslavia Davis Cup team reached three times semi finals: in 1988, 1989 and 1991.

Yugoslavia won 1991 Hopman Cup with Monica Seles and Goran Prpić in the team and World Team Cup in 1990 when Goran Ivanišević, Goran Prpić and Slobodan Živojinović represented country.

== Athletics ==
Yugoslavia won two Olympic medals in athletics. Ivan Gubijan won a silver medal at the 1948 Summer Olympics in London in hammer throw and Franjo Mihalić won a silver medal at the 1956 Summer Olympics in marathon.

Yugoslavian athletes never won a medal at the World Championships. The biggest success achieved Yugoslavian 4 × 400 m relay at the 1991 World Championships in Tokyo when Dejan Jovković, Nenad Đurović, Ismail Mačev and Slobodan Branković won fourth place.

At the European Championships Yugoslavian athletes won 15 medals, 6 of them gold, 6 silver and 3 bronze medals. The most notable athlete is Vera Nikolić, two times European champion and once bronze medalist in 800m. Nikolić is also a former world record holder in 800m. The rest five gold medals are won by: Luciano Sušanj in 800m, Miloš Srejović in triple jump, Snežana Pajkić in 1500m and Dragutin Topić in high jump. Nenad Stekić two times was European runner-up in long jump, 5th at the World Championship and European record holder. Silver medals also brought: Petar Šegedin in 3000 metres steeplechase, Stanko Lorger in 110m hurdles, Olga Gere and Biljana Petrović in high jump. Besides Vera Nikolić, bronze medalists were Nataša Urbančič in javelin throw and Borut Bilač in long jump.

At the European Indoor Championships Yugoslavian athletes were very successful. They won total of 26 medals, 6 gold, 7 silver and 13 bronze. Some of notable athletes who competed at these championships are: Jelica Pavličić, Zlatan Saračević, Vladimir Milić, Dragan Zdravković, Josip Alebić, Jože Međumurac, Milovan Savić, Ivan Ivančić, Jovan Lazarević, Slobodanka Čolović...

Yugoslavian athletes won medals in various disciplines at the Mediterranean Games and Summer Universiade.

Yugoslavia hosted European Athletics Championships in 1962 in Belgrade and in 1990 in Split. Yugoslavia was also the host of the 1969 European Indoor Games, competition who is just one year later renames in European Indoor Championships.

Belgrade was two times the host of men's edition of the European Champion Clubs Cup. Athletics club Red Star Belgrade won men's competition in 1989, in 1981 took second place and in 1976 third while women's team was second in 1989 and third in 1988. Athletics club Zajednica ZA was second in women's edition in 1985, and AC Slavonija was third in 1986.

== Swimming ==
=== Olympics ===
Đurđica Bjedov is the only Yugoslavian swimmer to win an Olympic medal. At the 1968 Summer Olympics in Mexico City she became Olympic champion in 100m breaststroke and Olympic runner up in 200m breaststroke.

Other notable Yugoslavian swimmers competed at Olympics include: Nenad Miloš, Hrvoje Barić, Tibor Rezmanj, Vlado Brinovec, Janez Kocmur, Milan Jeger, Mihovil Dorčić, Anton Nardeli, Đuro Radan, Veljko Rogošić, Ana Boban, Predrag Miloš, Aleksandar Pavličević, Višnja Petković, Igor Majcen, Nace Majcen...

=== FINA World Championships ===
Yugoslavia won two (2) medals at the FINA World Championships. Both medals were won by the Petrič brothers, Borut and Darjan Petrič, in 1500m freestyle.

Yugoslavia hosted the First FINA World Championship in swimming in 1973 in Belgrade.

=== European Championships ===
Yugoslavian swimmers won seventeen medals at the European Championships, one gold, seven silver and nine bronze medals. Besides brothers Petrič, European medalists were: Anton Cerer, Mirjana Šegrt, Marijan Stipetić, Boris Škanata, Esa Ligorio, Matijaž Koželj, Branko Vidović...

Split hosted 1981 European Championship.

== Alpine skiing ==
Yugoslavia won its first medal at the Winter Olympic Games in alpine skiing. At the 1984 Winter Olympics that were held in Sarajevo, Jure Franko won a silver medal in giant slalom. Four years later, at the Olympic Games in Calgary, Mateja Svet also won a silver medal in the giant slalom. Mateja Svet was the only alpine skier from Yugoslavia, who won a gold medal at the World Championships. At the World Championships, she won a total of five medals, one gold, one silver and three bronze in the three disciplines: slalom, giant slalom and super giant slalom. Bojan Križaj was a world runner-up in 1982. in the slalom. That same year, Boris Strel won the bronze medal in the giant slalom. Tomaž Čižman won the bronze medal in super G at the World Championship in 1989 and Nataša Bokal won the silver in 1991 in the slalom.

Mateja Svet was the winner of the World Cup giant slalom in 1988, Rok Petrovič was the slalom winner in 1986. Bojan Križaj repeated his success in 1987.

Yugoslavia organized World Cup races in Kranjska Gora, Maribor and Sarajevo.

== Cross-country skiing ==
Yugoslavia competed in cross-country skiing at the every Olympic games except in 1972. Country's best finish was in relay, 9th place in both, men's and women's, while the best individual finish was achieved in 1936, 10th place by Franc Smolej.

Yugoslavia hosted World Cup races in Bohinj and Sarajevo.

== Ski jumping ==
Ski jumping was a very popular individual sport in Yugoslavia. Matjaž Debelak won a bronze medal in individual large hill at the 1988 Winter Olympics as well as silver medal in team large hill along with Miran Tepeš, Primož Ulaga and Matjaž Zupan. Franci Petek became World champion in 1991.

Other notable ski jumpers are Bogdan Norčič, Danilo Pudgar, Rajko Lotrič, Ludvik Zajc Vasja Bajc, Janez Polda...

Yugoslavia hosted World Cup races in Planica.

== Ice hockey ==
Yugoslavia national ice hockey team five times competed at the Winter Olympic Games. The best placement was achieved in 1968 when Yugoslavia took ninth place. At the World Championships Yugoslavia competed twenty-nine times. In 1974 team came eighth which is the best Yugoslavian result at the World Championships. Yugoslavian team also competed three times at the European Championships. In 1968 came seventh. Team's top scorer is Zvone Šuvak, while Edo Hafner made the most appearances.

Yugoslavia hosted 1966 World Championship in Ljubljana.

Only six teams managed to win Yugoslav Ice Hockey League. The most successful team is Jesenice with 23 titles, followed by Olimpija with 13, Partizan with 7, Medveščak with 3, Mladost with 2 and SD Zagreb with 1, while domestic cup won only 4 teams. Jesenice holds records with 8 titles. Medveščak, Olimpija and Partizan are other three winners of national cup.

== Figure skating ==
Sanda Dubravčić won a silver medal at the 1981 European Championship. At the 1984 Winter Olympics she was the final Olympic torchbearer and won 10th place.

Yugoslavia hosted 1970 World Figure Skating Championships and 4 times European Championship: 1967 in Ljubljana, 1974 and 1979 in Zagreb and 1987 in Sarajevo.

== See also ==
- List of indoor arenas in Yugoslavia
- Sport in Bosnia and Herzegovina
- Sport in Croatia
- Sport in Kosovo
- Sport in Montenegro
- Sport in North Macedonia
- Sport in Serbia
- Sport in Slovenia
- Yugoslavia at the Olympics
- Yugoslavia at the Mediterranean Games
