= Swimming at the 1972 Summer Olympics – Men's 100 metre butterfly =

Men's 100 metre butterfly at the Games of the XX Olympiad
- Venue: Olympia Schwimmhalle
- Dates: 30 August 1972 (heats & semifinals); 31 August 1972 (final)
- Competitors: 39 from 27 nations
- Winning time: 54.27 WR

Medalists
1st place, gold medalist(s)		Mark Spitz	United States
2nd place, silver medalist(s)		Bruce Robertson	Canada
3rd place, bronze medalist(s)		Jerry Heidenreich	United States

The men's 100 metre butterfly event at the 1972 Olympic Games took place between August 30 and 31. This swimming event used the butterfly stroke. Because an Olympic size swimming pool is 50 metres long, this race consisted of two lengths of the pool.

The winning margin was 1.29 seconds which as of 2024 remains the only time this event for men was won by more than one second at the Olympics.

== Results ==
=== Heats ===
Heat 1

Rank	Athlete	Country	Time	Notes
1	Dave Edgar	United States	57.30	Q
2	Roger Pyttel	East Germany	57.98	Q
3	Peter Remmel	West Germany	58.97	
4	Andrzej Chudziński	Poland	1:00.22	
5	Alain Mosconi	France	1:00.23	
6	Salvador Vilanova	El Salvador	1:01.25	
7	Martin Edwards	Great Britain	1:01:29	
8	Bruno Bassoul	Lebanon	1:05.45	

Key: Q = Qualified

Heat 2

Rank	Athlete	Country	Time	Notes
1	Bruce Robertson	Canada	56.45	Q
2	István Szentirmay	Hungary	58.07	Q
3	Sérgio Waismann	Brazil	58.37	Q
4	Yasuhiro Komazaki	Japan	59.71	
5	Hugo Valencia	Mexico	1:00.14	
6	Feridun Aybars	Turkey	1:04:46	
7	Chhay-Kheng Nhem	Khmer Republic	1:05.12	
8	Wong Ronnie	Hong Kong	1:07.50	

Key: Q = Qualified

Heat 3

Rank	Athlete	Country	Time	Notes
1	Roland Matthes	East Germany	57.16	Q
2	Neil Rogers	Australia	57.40	Q
3	John Mills	Great Britain	58.28	Q
4	Viktor Sharygin	Soviet Union	58.40	
5	Arturo Lang-Lenton	Spain	59.22	
6	Georgijs Kuļikovs	Soviet Union	59.28	
7	Dimitrios Karydis	Greece	1:00.06	
8	Roy Chan	Singapore	1:02.24	

Key: Q = Qualified

Heat 4

Rank	Athlete	Country	Time	Notes
1	Jerry Heidenreich	United States	56.86	Q
2	Lutz Stoklasa	West Germany	57.50	Q
3	Bob Kasting	Canada	57.65	Q
4	Geoffrey Ferreira	Trinidad and Tobago	58.26	Q
5	Jacques Leloup	Belgium	58.77	
6	Vladimir Krivtsov	Soviet Union	59.83	
7	Carlos Singson	Philippines	1:02.11	

Key: Q = Qualified

Heat 5

Rank	Athlete	Country	Time	Notes
1	Mark Spitz	United States	56.45	Q
2	Hartmut Flöckner	East Germany	57.41	Q
3	Juan Carlos Bello	Peru	57.54	Q
4	Byron MacDonald	Canada	57.56	Q
5	Hans Lampe	West Germany	59.00	
6	Sean Maher	Great Britain	59.50	
7	Vasil Dobrev	Bulgaria	1:00.07	
8	Aleksandar Pavličević	Yugoslavia	1:00.29	

Key: Q = Qualified

=== Semifinals ===
Heat 1

Rank	Athlete	Country	Time	Notes
1	Roland Matthes	East Germany	56.51	Q
2	Bruce Robertson	Canada	56.86	Q
3	Byron MacDonald	Canada	57.06	Q
4	Neil Rogers	Australia	57.28	Q
5	Roger Pyttel	East Germany	57.69	
6	Sérgio Waismann	Brazil	58.07	
7	Lutz Stoklasa	West Germany	58.33	
8	Geoffrey Ferreira	Trinidad and Tobago	58.54	

Heat 2

Rank	Athlete	Country	Time	Notes
1	Mark Spitz	United States	55.98	Q
2	Jerry Heidenreich	United States	56.18	Q
3	Dave Edgar	United States	56.88	Q
4	Hartmut Flöckner	East Germany	56.96	Q
5	Juan Carlos Bello	Peru	57.51	
6	Bob Kasting	Canada	57.67	
7	John Mills	Great Britain	58.13	
8	István Szentirmay	Hungary	58.25	

=== Final ===
Rank	Athlete	Country	Time	Notes
1	Mark Spitz	United States	54.27	WR
2	Bruce Robertson	Canada	55.56	
3	Jerry Heidenreich	United States	55.74	
4	Roland Matthes	East Germany	55.87	
5	Dave Edgar	United States	56.11	
6	Byron MacDonald	Canada	57.27	
7	Hartmut Flöckner	East Germany	57.40	
8	Neil Rogers	Australia	57.90	

Key: WR = World record
