= Iris Corniani =

Italian swimmer (born 1958)

Personal information
- Born: 3 December 1958 (age 67) Mantua, Italy

Sport
- Sport: Swimming
- Strokes: Breaststroke
Medal record
Representing Italy
Mediterranean Games
Silver medal – second place	1975 Algiers	100m breaststroke

Iris Corniani (born 3 December 1958) is an Italian former swimmer. She competed in two events at the 1976 Summer Olympics.
