= Sylvie Testuz =

French swimmer

Personal information
- Born: 4 June 1959 (age 67)

Sport
- Sport: Swimming
Medal record
Women's swimming
Representing France
Mediterranean Games
| Gold medal – first place | 1975 Algiers | 100 m backstroke |

Sylvie Testuz (born 4 June 1959) is a French former swimmer who competed in the 1976 Summer Olympics.
