= Vasil Dobrev =

Vasil Dobrev may refer to:

- Vasil Dobrev (swimmer) (born 1947), Bulgarian swimmer
- Vasil Dobrev (footballer) (born 1998), Bulgarian footballer
