= Swimming in Yugoslavia =

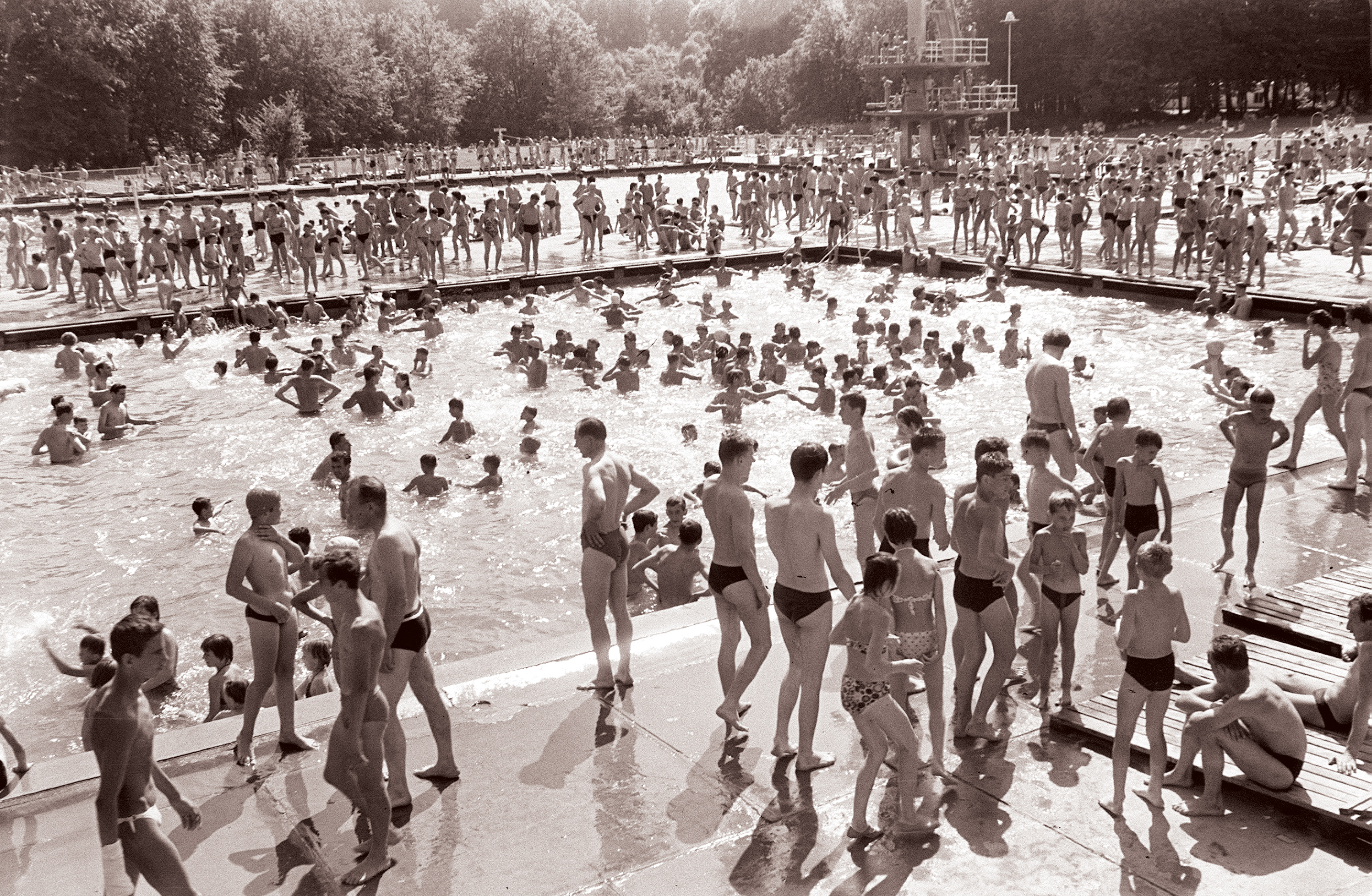
Yugoslavs swimming at a pool on Maribor Island, Slovenia, in 1961.

Swimming in Yugoslavia (SFRJ) had been a competitive sport during the existence of Yugoslavia from 1918–1992. Yugoslavian swimmers competed at the Olympics, the FINA World Championships, and the LEN European Aquatics Championships; they also competed in national championships.

== Olympics ==
Yugoslavian swimmers at Olympics

== World Championships ==
Yugoslavian swimmers at FINA World Championships

== European Championships ==
Yugoslavian swimmers at European Championships

== Mediterranean Games ==
1979, Split, Croatia, Yugoslavia

== National Championships ==
=== Youth Seniors ===
Year	Date	Edition	Location	Athletes	Events	Events details	Winner of the medal table	Second of the medal table	Third of the medal table
1969		1			37	18 (m), 19 (f)			
1980		5			37	18 (m), 19 (f)			
1981		6	Belgrade, Yugoslavia	200+	37	18 (m), 19 (f)			

=== Youth Juniors U16: 16 Years of Age and Younger ===
Year	Date	Edition	Location	Athletes	Events	Events details	Winner of the medal table	Second of the medal table	Third of the medal table
1976		2	Mostar, Bosnia and Herzegovina, Yugoslavia	200+	37	18 (m), 19 (f)			
1978		2	, Yugoslavia	200+	37	18 (m), 19 (f)			
1979		2	, Yugoslavia	200+	37	18 (m), 19 (f)			

=== Youth U14: Children 14 Years of Age and Younger ===
Year	Date	Edition	Location	Athletes	Events	Events details	Winner of the medal table	Second of the medal table	Third of the medal table
1976		1			37	18 (m), 19 (f)			
1977		2	, Yugoslavia	200+	37	18 (m), 19 (f)			

=== Youth U12: Children 12 Years of Age and Younger ===
Year	Date	Edition	Location	Athletes	Events	Events details	Winner of the medal table	Second of the medal table	Third of the medal table
1974		1			37	18 (m), 19 (f)			
1975		2	, Yugoslavia	200+	37	18 (m), 19 (f)			

=== Youth U10: Children 10 Years of Age and Younger ===
Year	Date	Edition	Location	Athletes	Events	Events details	Winner of the medal table	Second of the medal table	Third of the medal table
1972		1	Ljubljana, Slovenia, Yugoslavia	200+	37	18 (m), 19 (f)			
1973		2	Split, Croatia, Yugoslavia	170	37	18 (m), 19 (f)			
