= Friðrik Guðmundsson =

Friðrik Guðmundsson can refer to:

- Friðrik Guðmundsson (athlete) (1925-2002), Icelandic Olympic athlete
- Friðrik Guðmundsson (swimmer) (born 1955), Icelandic Olympic swimmer
