= Walter Mack =

Walter Mack may refer to:

- Walter Staunton Mack Jr. (1895–1990), American businessman
- Walter Mack (swimmer) (born 1953), German Olympic swimmer
