= Theodoropoulos =

Theodoropoulos (Θεοδωρόπουλος), meaning "son of Theodoros", is a surname. The feminine form is Theodoropoulou (Θεοδωροπούλου). Notable people with the surname include:

- Argyris Theodoropoulos (born 1981), Greek water polo player
- John Theodoropoulos (born 1972), Greek Canadian Orthopedic Surgeon
- Avra Theodoropoulou (1880–1963), Greek musician and women's rights activist
- Dimitrios Theodoropoulos (born 1954), Greek swimmer
- Ioannis Theodoropoulos, Greek pole vaulter
- Kostas Theodoropoulos (born 1990), Greek footballer
- Sakis Theodoropoulos, Greek journalist
