= Lionel Beylot-Bourcelot =

French swimmer

Personal information
- Nationality: French
- Born: 28 November 1957 (age 68)

Sport
- Sport: Swimming
Medal record
Representing France
Mediterranean Games
| Bronze medal – third place | 1975 Algiers | 200m backstroke |

Lionel Beylot-Bourcelot (born 28 November 1957) is a French former swimmer. He won a bronze medal in the 1975 Mediterranean Games in Al-Jaza'ir (Algiers), Algeria, swimming the 200 m backstroke. He competed in the men's 100 metre backstroke at the 1976 Summer Olympics, where he achieved a time of 1:01.58. He attended Yale University.
