= Rolf Pettersson =

Rolf Pettersson can refer to:

- Rolf Pettersson (ice hockey) (1926-2010), Swedish ice hockey player
- Rolf Pettersson (orienteer), Swedish orienteer
- Rolf Pettersson (swimmer) (1953-2015), Swedish swimmer
