= Alain Charmey =

Swiss swimmer

Personal information
- Nationality: Swiss
- Born: 14 June 1952 (age 74)

Sport
- Sport: Swimming

Alain Charmey (born 14 June 1952) is a Swiss former freestyle swimmer. He competed in the men's 400 metre freestyle at the 1972 Summer Olympics.
