= Brian Clifford =

Irish swimmer

Personal information
- Born: 20 August 1956 (age 69)

Sport
- Sport: Swimming

Brian Clifford (born 20 August 1956) is an Irish former swimmer. From Cork, Clifford attended Presentation Brothers College and played with the Irish schools' rugby team. At the age of 15, he represented Ireland in the men's 1500 metre freestyle at the 1972 Summer Olympics in Munich. He qualified for the Munich Olympics based on the times recorded at the Amateur Swimming Association championships in July 1972. In 1985, Clifford participated in the inaugural World Masters Games in Toronto.
