= Pedro Balcells =

Spanish swimmer

Personal information
- Born: July 8, 1954 (age 71) Olot, Spain

Sport
- Sport: Swimming
- Strokes: Breaststroke
Medal record
Representing Spain
Mediterranean Games
Gold medal – first place	1971 Izmir	200m breaststroke
Gold medal – first place	1971 Izmir	4x100m medley relay
Gold medal – first place	1975 Algiers	4x100m medley relay
Silver medal – second place	1971 Izmir	100m breaststroke
Silver medal – second place	1975 Algiers	200m breaststroke
Bronze medal – third place	1975 Algiers	100m breaststroke

Pedro Balcells (born 8 July 1954) is a Spanish former breaststroke swimmer who competed in the 1972 Summer Olympics and in the 1976 Summer Olympics.
