= Jorge Comas (swimmer) =

Spanish swimmer

Personal information
- Born: February 8, 1954 (age 72) Barcelona, Spain

Sport
- Sport: Swimming
Medal record
Representing Spain
Mediterranean Games
Gold medal – first place	1971 Izmir	4x100m freestyle relay
Gold medal – first place	1971 Izmir	4x100m medley relay
Gold medal – first place	1975 Algiers	4x100m medley relay
Silver medal – second place	1971 Izmir	100m freestyle
Silver medal – second place	1975 Algiers	100m freestyle

Jorge Comas (born 8 February 1954) is a Spanish former swimmer who competed in the 1972 Summer Olympics and in the 1976 Summer Olympics.
