= Donatella Schiavon =

Italian swimmer

Personal information
- Born: November 28, 1957 (age 68) Santa Maria di Leuca, Lecce, Italy

Sport
- Sport: Swimming
- Strokes: Butterfly
Medal record
Representing Italy
Mediterranean Games
| Gold medal – first place | 1971 Izmir | 100m butterfly |
| Silver medal – second place | 1975 Algiers | 100m butterfly |

Donatella Schiavon (born 28 November 1957) is an Italian former swimmer who competed in the 1976 Summer Olympics.
