= Christoph Kreienbühl =

Swiss swimmer

Personal information
- Nationality: Swiss
- Born: 14 January 1955 (age 71)

Sport
- Sport: Swimming

Christoph Kreienbühl (born 14 January 1955) is a Swiss former swimmer. He competed in the men's 1500 metre freestyle at the 1972 Summer Olympics.
