= Antonio Culebras =

Spanish swimmer (born 1950)

Personal information
- Born: September 14, 1950 (age 75)

Sport
- Sport: Swimming
Medal record
Representing Spain
Mediterranean Games
Gold medal – first place	1971 Izmir	4x100m freestyle relay
Bronze medal – third place	1971 Izmir	200m individual medley

Antonio Culebras (born 14 September 1950) is a Spanish former freestyle swimmer who competed in the 1972 Summer Olympics.
