= Santiago Esteva =

Spanish swimmer (born 1952)

Personal information
- Born: July 16, 1952 (age 73)

Sport
- Sport: Swimming
- Strokes: Backstroke, freestyle, medley
Medal record
Representing Spain
European Championships
Silver medal – second place	1970 Barcelona	100m backstroke
Silver medal – second place	1970 Barcelona	200m backstroke
Bronze medal – third place	1970 Barcelona	400m freestyle
Bronze medal – third place	1970 Barcelona	1500m freestyle
Mediterranean Games
Gold medal – first place	1971 Izmir	4x100m freestyle relay
Gold medal – first place	1971 Izmir	4x100m medley relay
Gold medal – first place	1975 Algiers	100m backstroke
Gold medal – first place	1975 Algiers	200m backstroke
Gold medal – first place	1975 Algiers	4x100m medley relay
Silver medal – second place	1971 Izmir	4x200m freestyle relay
Bronze medal – third place	1971 Izmir	400m freestyle

Santiago Esteva (born 16 July 1952) is a Spanish former backstroke, freestyle and medley swimmer who competed in the 1968 Summer Olympics and in the 1976 Summer Olympics.
