= Montserrat Majo =

Spanish swimmer

Personal information
- Born: April 26, 1959 (age 67) Manresa, Catalonia, Spain

Sport
- Sport: Swimming
- Strokes: Butterfly
Medal record
Representing Spain
Mediterranean Games
Bronze medal – third place	1975 Algiers	100m butterfly

Montserrat Majó (born 26 April 1959) is a Catalan former butterfly swimmer who competed in the 1976 Summer Olympics.
