= Dimitrios Karydis =

Greek swimmer

Personal information
- Born: 20 January 1951 (age 75)

Sport
- Sport: Swimming

Dimitrios Karydis (born 20 January 1951) is a Greek former swimmer. He competed in the men's 100 metre butterfly at the 1972 Summer Olympics.
