= Lorenzo Marugo =

Italian swimmer (born 1952)

Personal information
- Born: January 31, 1952 (age 74) Genoa, Italy

Sport
- Sport: Swimming
Medal record
Representing Italy
Mediterranean Games
Gold medal – first place	1971 Izmir	400m individual medley
Gold medal – first place	1975 Algiers	400m individual medley
Gold medal – first place	1975 Algiers	4x200m freestyle relay
Silver medal – second place	1975 Algiers	200m individual medley

Lorenzo Marugo (born 31 January 1952) is an Italian former swimmer who competed in the 1972 Summer Olympics.
