= Paolo Barelli =

Italian politician and former swimmer

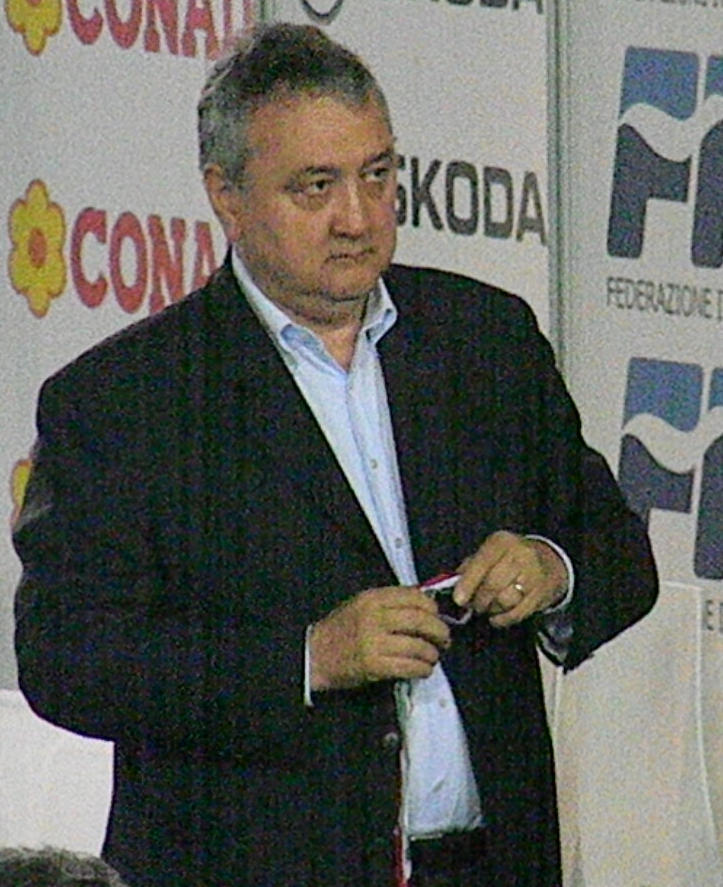

Personal information
- Nationality: Italian
- Born: 7 June 1954 (age 72)
- Height: 1.84 m (6 ft 0 in)

Sport
- Sport: Swimming
Medal record
World Championships (LC)
Bronze medal – third place	1975 Cali	4×100 m freestyle
Mediterranean Games
Gold medal – first place	1975 Algiers	100 m Butterfly

Paolo Barelli (born 7 June 1954 in Rome, Italy) is an Italian Senator and suspended president of the Italian Swimming Federation, and a former swimmer. On 24 July 2009 he was named Honorary Secretary of FINA for the 2009-2013 term. In October 2012, Barelli was elected president of LEN.

== Biography ==
Paolo Barelli was born in Rome is a former athlete of the Gruppo Sportivo Fiamme Oro.

Barelli broke 23 times the Italian record in several distances, including the 100m butterfly and relays.

He swam for Italy at the 1972 and 1976 Summer Olympics.

In 1975, he won the 100m butterfly at the 1975 Mediterranean Games (58.10).

In the 1976 Olympics in Montreal, he reached the Olympic final with the 4 × 200 m Freestyle Relay (7th) and the 4 × 100 m Medley Relay (8th).

He was elected president of the Italian Swimming Federation in 2000; he is the first high-level swimmer to cover this position.

Barelli entered politics with the Silvio Berlusconi's party Forza Italia, was elected to the Italian Senate in 2001 and reelected in 2006.
