= Laurie Lawrence =

Australian swimming coach (born 1941)

Laurie Joseph Lawrence (born 14 October 1941) is an Australian swimming coach. He was also an Australia national rugby union team member in 1964.

== Early life ==
Lawrence was born in the Queensland city of Townsville, where his father, Alan 'Stumpy' Lawrence, worked as a publican during the war years. Afflicted by bronchiectasis through his childhood Lawrence had part of his lung surgically removed, and was advised to pursue swimming to improve his remaining lung function. This prompted Lawrence's father to change jobs to become the manager of the Tobruk Pool, on Townsville's foreshore. During 1956 and 1960 the Tobruk Pool was the training venue for the Australian Olympic Team. Greats like Dawn Fraser, Lorraine Crapp, Jon Henricks, John Konrads, Ilsa Konrads, Murray Rose, David Theile and John Devitt were some of the many athletes who trained there. Lawrence states:

And it was there that I got my real passion and love for swimming... ...'56 was just a magic time for me, as a young fella. And when I wasn't down amongst the athletes, asking for their autograph, then I was up there sitting on the balcony, hands over the edge of the concrete building just peering down into the water, watching Dawn Fraser, Murray Rose, John Konrads, David Tyler, Lorraine Crapp - they just keep coming - Kevin Berry. The names, the Olympic champions, and to sit up there one night, one night in Townsville when they had the last carnival before they were to go away and see 13 world records in one night, it's just etched indelibly into my memories, you know. It's just...fantastic.

Lawrence's parents separated later in the 1950s, and Lawrence moved with his mother to Brisbane. He attended St Laurence's College and then Kelvin Grove Teachers College. He played rugby union to get a scholarship to be a Phys Ed teacher, which led to his selection for the 1964 international tour of New Zealand.

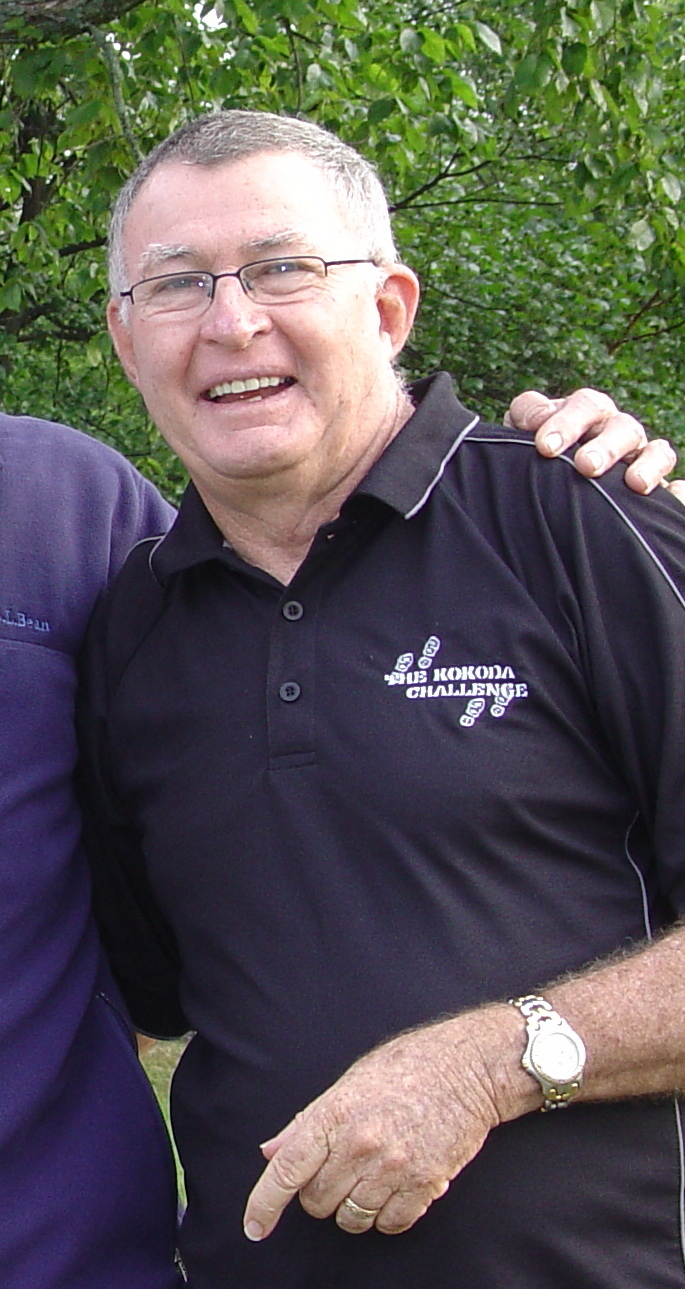
Laurie Lawrence, 2006

== Swim coach ==
For health reasons Lawrence moved back to Townsville and began to establish himself as a swim coach. During this time he made a study tour to see Mark Spitz's coach and learn from his training regimen. He moved to Sydney to take over as swim coach from Don Talbot at the Hurstville Club. He inherited from Talbot the responsibility for young Stephen Holland, whom he guided to a world record and world championship in 1973. Lawrence then took a hiatus from swim coaching in 1975 to support his wife (and former swimmer) Jocelyn, after the birth of his daughter Jane.

Lawrence returned to elite coaching with great success. Lawrence was one of the Australian Olympic swimming team coaches for the Los Angeles in 1984, Seoul in 1988 and Barcelona in 1992. His best known protégés include Steve Holland, Tracey Wickham, Jon Sieben and Duncan Armstrong. His Olympic coaching achievements include 10 gold, 11 silver and 12 bronze medals from swimmers he has directly assisted. Swimmers he has coached boast 23 world records. He also coached Australian swimmers at the 1982 Commonwealth Games in Brisbane and the 1986 Commonwealth Games in Edinburgh.

Lawrence's involvement with Australian Olympic swimming continued in Atlanta 1996, Sydney 2000, Athens 2004 and Beijing 2008 Olympic Games with a brief to unite, inspire, motivate and relax the entire team. He has success in securing non-existent tickets to enable Australian athletes to attend events in support of fellow Australians. His personal best is smuggling 150 athletes into the Australia vs United States basketball game when he actually only had 20 tickets.

== Other interests ==
In 1988, Lawrence launched a Kids Alive Drowning Prevention Campaign to combat the problem of accidental death by drowning in the under five age group. With support from the federal government and community service advertising, the program runs nationally. He has researched, documented and developed a program which is now internationally recognised

Lawrence is also a motivational speaker.

== Family ==
Lawrence married Jocelyn in 1974. They have three children, all of whom are employed at the Laurie Lawrence Swim School in Brisbane.

== Honours ==
Lawrence was inducted into the Sport Australia Hall of Fame in 1991 and received an Australian Sports Medal in 2000. He was appointed Officer of the Order of Australia in the 2025 Australia Day Honours.

== See also ==
- List of members of the International Swimming Hall of Fame
