= José Pujol =

Spanish swimmer

Personal information
- Full name: José Pujol Simón
- Born: 3 August 1951 (age 74)

Sport
- Sport: Swimming
Medal record
Representing Spain
Mediterranean Games
Gold medal – first place	1971 Izmir	4×100 m freestyle
Silver medal – second place	1971 Izmir	4×200 m freestyle

José Pujol (born 3 August 1951) is a Spanish former freestyle swimmer who competed in the 1972 Summer Olympics.
