= Axel Freudenberg =

German swimmer

Personal information
- Nationality: German
- Born: 16 June 1954 (age 72) Freiberg, East Germany

Sport
- Sport: Swimming

Axel Freudenberg (born 16 June 1954) is a German former swimmer. He competed in the men's 1500 metre freestyle at the 1972 Summer Olympics.
