= Peter Remmel =

German swimmer

Personal information
- Born: 3 February 1954 (age 72) Bottrop, West Germany

Sport
- Sport: Swimming

Peter Remmel (born 3 February 1954) is a German former swimmer. He competed in the men's 100 metre butterfly at the 1972 Summer Olympics.
