= Stephen Holland (swimmer) =

Australian Olympic swimmer

Stephen Holland OAM
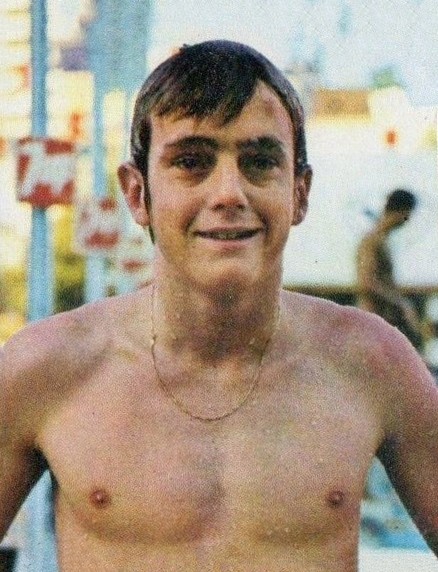
- Stephen Holland, 1974 or earlier

Personal information
- Full name: Stephen Roy Holland
- Nickname: "Steve"
- National team: Australia
- Born: 31 May 1958 (age 68) Brisbane, Queensland

Sport
- Sport: Swimming
- Strokes: Freestyle
Medal record
Representing Australia
Olympic Games
Bronze medal – third place	1976 Montreal	1500 m freestyle
World Championships (LC)
Gold medal – first place	1973 Belgrade	1500 m freestyle
Commonwealth Games
Gold medal – first place	1974 Christchurch	1500 m freestyle

Stephen Roy Holland, OAM (born 31 May 1958) is an Australian former freestyle swimmer of the 1970s who won a bronze medal in the 1500 m freestyle at the 1976 Summer Olympics in Montreal. In a brief and spectacular career, he broke 12 world records and was known as the Super Fish after his coach Laurie Lawrence likened his two-beat kick to the tail of a fish. He was educated at the Anglican Church Grammar School.

Holland made his first headlines as a 15-year-old, when he broke the 1500 m freestyle world record at the Australian Championships. In the process, his 800 m split also broke the 800 m freestyle world record. This qualified him to make his international debut at the 1973 World Aquatics Championships in Belgrade, Yugoslavia, where he again broke both world records en route to the 1500 m freestyle gold medal, setting a time of 15 m 31.85s. Both he and the 2nd classified swimmer (American Rick DeMont) did not stop at the 1500 and continued for 100 m further:

Holland and American Rick DeMont had a stirring contest in the 1500m final at the 1973 world championships in Belgrade. Holland did not hear the bell to indicate two laps to go and kept swimming through 1500m, bringing DeMont through in comic pursuit. The Queenslander turned again after 1600m, stopping only when the yells and bells from officials got his attention. He'd broken the 800m and 1500m world records in the race – and if there was such a thing he'd still have the 1600m world championship record as well.

Following this victory, Holland was awarded the ABC Sportsman of the Year award.

In 1974, Holland won a gold medal in the 1500 m freestyle at the Christchurch Commonwealth Games, leaving the silver medallist from New Zealand, Mark Treffers more than 25 seconds in arrears. Although the time was not a world record, his 800 m split of 8 m 15.88 s bettered his previous 800 m record.

On arrival in Montreal for the 1976 Summer Olympics, Holland had set 12 world records, and was expected by the Australian public to win. However, he departed from his usual strategy of fast-starting, attacking swimming and decided to swim conservatively and outstay his main rivals, the American duo of Bobby Hackett and Brian Goodell. Holland made his move at the 800 m mark, but then found that he was fading in the final 200 m, when Goodell and Hackett overtook him. Although Holland had bettered his previous world record, Goodell surpassed it to take the gold.

Holland later swam the 400 m, finishing fifth behind Goodell, who again set a world record. After the Games, weighed down by the burden of public disappointment, Holland decided at the age of 18 that he was "washed up" and decided to retire from competitive swimming.

Holland was awarded the Order of Australia Medal for services to sport of swimming in 1985, and was inducted into the International Swimming Hall of Fame in 1989. In 2000, Holland was awarded the Australian Sports Medal.

== See also ==
- List of members of the International Swimming Hall of Fame
- List of Commonwealth Games medallists in swimming (men)
- List of Olympic medalists in swimming (men)
- World record progression 800 metres freestyle
- World record progression 1500 metres freestyle

== Bibliography ==
- Andrews, Malcolm (2000). Australia at the Olympic Games. Sydney, New South Wales: ABC Books. pp. 212–213. ISBN 0-7333-0884-8.

Records
Preceded by Mike Burton	Men's 1500 metres freestyle world record holder (long course); 5 August 1973 – 25 August 1974	Succeeded by Tim Shaw
Preceded by Tim Shaw	Men's 1500 metres freestyle world record holder (long course); 25 January 1975 – 21 June 1975	Succeeded by Tim Shaw
Preceded by Tim Shaw	Men's 1500 metres freestyle world record holder (long course); 27 February 1976 – 21 June 1976	Succeeded by Brian Goodell
