= Silvia Fontana (swimmer) =

Spanish swimmer

Personal information
- Born: December 24, 1961 (age 64) Tarragona, Spain

Sport
- Sport: Swimming
- Strokes: Backstroke
Medal record
Representing Spain
Mediterranean Games
Bronze medal – third place	1975 Algiers	100m backstroke

Silvia Fontana (born 24 December 1961) is a Spanish former backstroke swimmer who competed in the 1976 Summer Olympics.
