= Eugen Almer =

Romanian swimmer

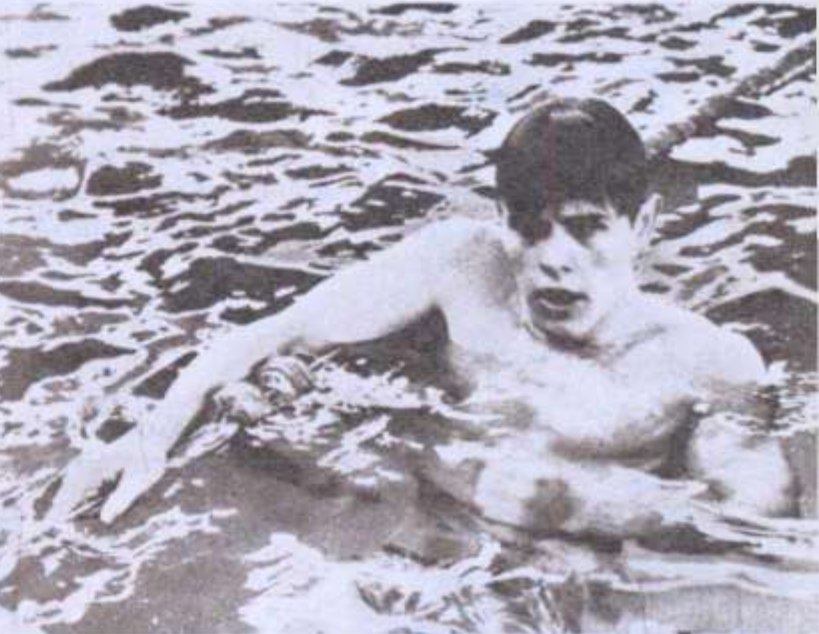

Personal information
- Nationality: Romania
- Born: 14 January 1953 (age 73) Reșița, SR Romania
- Height: 176 cm (5 ft 9 in)
- Weight: 71 kg (157 lb)

Sport
- Sport: Swimming
- Strokes: Freestyle; Butterfly
- Club: Olympia Reşiţa

Eugen Almer (born 14 January 1953) is a Romanian former swimmer. He competed in freestyle and butterfly events, representing Romania at international tournaments. He was a member of Olympia Reşiţa.

He competed in the men's 1500 metre freestyle at the 1972 Summer Olympics.

The next year he participated in the 1500 metre freestyle event and 200 metre butterfly event at the 1973 World Aquatics Championships in Belgrade.

He comes from an established sporty family.
