= Aleksandar Pavličević =

Yugoslav swimmer

Personal information
- Born: 21 February 1950 (age 76)

Sport
- Sport: Swimming
Medal record
Representing Yugoslavia
Mediterranean Games
Silver medal – second place	1971 Izmir	100m butterfly
Bronze medal – third place	1971 Izmir	4x100m freestyle relay
Bronze medal – third place	1971 Izmir	4x200m freestyle relay
Bronze medal – third place	1971 Izmir	4x100m medley relay

Aleksandar Pavličević (born 21 February 1950) is a Yugoslav former swimmer. He competed in the men's 100 metre butterfly at the 1972 Summer Olympics.
