= Gaetano Tosto =

Italian weightlifter

Personal information
- Nationality: Italian
- Born: 18 April 1948 (age 76); Catania, Italy

Sport
- Sport: Weightlifting

Gaetano Tosto (born 18 April 1948) is an Italian weightlifter. He competed at the 1972 Summer Olympics and the 1980 Summer Olympics.
