= Sandro Rudan =

Yugoslav swimmer

Personal information
- Born: 23 January 1953 (age 73) Rovinj, Yugoslavia

Sport
- Sport: Swimming
Medal record
Representing Yugoslavia
Mediterranean Games
Silver medal – second place	1975 Algiers	200m freestyle

Sandro Rudan (born 23 January 1953) is a Yugoslav former swimmer. He competed in two events at the 1972 Summer Olympics.
