= Walter Mack (swimmer) =

German swimmer

Personal information
- Born: 4 January 1953 (age 73) Bonn, West Germany

Sport
- Sport: Swimming

Walter Mack (born 4 January 1953) is a German former swimmer. He competed in the men's 200 metre butterfly at the 1972 Summer Olympics.
