= Massimo Nistri =

Italian swimmer

Personal information
- Born: October 10, 1955
- Died: 1 May 2024 (aged 68)

Sport
- Sport: Swimming
- Strokes: Backstroke
Medal record
Representing Italy
Mediterranean Games
Gold medal – first place	1971 Izmir	200m backstroke

Massimo Nistri (10 October 1955 – 1 May 2024) was an Italian backstroke swimmer who competed in the 1972 Summer Olympics.
