= Rolf Pettersson (swimmer) =

Swedish swimmer

Personal information
- Full name: Rolf Rune Pettersson
- Nationality: Swedish
- Born: 26 March 1953 Uppsala, Sweden
- Died: 8 July 2015 (aged 62) Stockholm, Sweden

Sport
- Sport: Swimming
- Club: Upsala S

Rolf Rune Pettersson (26 March 1953 – 8 July 2015) was a Swedish swimmer. He competed in the men's 200 metre freestyle at the 1972 Summer Olympics.

Pettersson represented Upsala S.
