= Alfredo Massazza =

Italian archer (1943–2004)

Personal information
- Nationality: Italian
- Born: 24 May 1943; Stradella, Italy
- Died: 17 March 2004 (aged 60)

Sport
- Sport: Archery

Alfredo Massazza (24 May 1943 – 17 March 2004) was an Italian archer. He competed in the men's individual event at the 1972 Summer Olympics.
