= Sergio Irredento =

Italian swimmer

Personal information
- Born: 12 April 1953 (age 73) Trieste, Italy

Sport
- Sport: Swimming

Sergio Irredento (born 12 April 1953) is an Italian former swimmer. He competed in the men's 1500 metre freestyle at the 1972 Summer Olympics.
