= Alessandra Finesso =

Italian swimmer

Personal information
- Born: 23 July 1956 Milan, Italy
- Died: 11 August 2007 (aged 51)

Sport
- Sport: Swimming
Medal record
Women's swimming
Representing Italy
Mediterranean Games
Gold medal – first place	1971 İzmir	100 m backstroke

Alessandra Finesso (23 July 1956 – 11 August 2007) was an Italian swimmer who competed in the 1972 Summer Olympics. She was born in Milan.
