= Håkon Iversøn =

Norwegian swimmer

Personal information
- Born: November 29, 1955 Namsos, Norway
- Died: July 6, 2021 (aged 65) Hamar, Norway

Sport
- Sport: Swimming

Håkon Iversøn (29 November 1955 – 6 July 2021) was a Norwegian swimmer. He competed in the men's 4 × 200 metre freestyle relay at the 1976 Summer Olympics.
