= Gaetano Carboni =

Italian swimmer

Personal information
- Born: 11 June 1955 (age 71) Sant'Elpidio a Mare, Italy

Sport
- Sport: Swimming

Gaetano Carboni (born 11 June 1955) is an Italian former swimmer. He competed in the men's 200 metre butterfly at the 1972 Summer Olympics.
