= Dusan Grozaj =

German swimmer

Personal information
- Nationality: German
- Born: 12 July 1955 Bratislava, Czechoslovakia
- Died: 1984 (aged 28–29)

Sport
- Sport: Swimming

Dusan Grozaj (12 July 1955 – 1984) was a German swimmer. He competed in the men's 1500 metre freestyle at the 1972 Summer Olympics.
