= Patrizia Miserini =

Italian swimmer (born 1958)

Personal information
- Born: February 11, 1958 (age 68)

Sport
- Sport: Swimming
Medal record
Representing Italy
Mediterranean Games
| Gold medal – first place | 1971 Izmir | 100m breaststroke |

Patrizia Miserini (born 11 February 1958) is an Italian former breaststroke swimmer who competed in the 1972 Summer Olympics.
