= List of indoor arenas in Yugoslavia =

The following is a list of indoor arenas in Yugoslavia, ordered by capacity.

== Arenas ==
Stadium	Capacity	City	Team(s)	Inaugurated
Dom Sportova	11,000	Zagreb	KK Cibona	1972
Hala Pionir	5,500	Belgrade	KK Crvena Zvezda	1973
Skenderija	5,500	Sarajevo	KK Bosna, KK Željezničar Sarajevo	1969
Hala Tivoli	5,000	Ljubljana	KK Olimpija	1965
Dvorana Mladosti	5,000	Rijeka	KK Kvarner	1973
Palata Sportova	4,000	Belgrade	KK Partizan, KK IMT, OKK Beograd	1968
Hala Borca kraj Morave	4,000	Čačak	KK Borac Čačak	1968
Sportski Centar Morača	4,000	Titograd	KK Budućnost	1978
Sportska Dvorana Mladost	4,000	Karlovac	KK Željezničar Karlovac	1967
Dvorana na Gripama	3,500	Split	KK Jugoplastika	1967
Hala Sportova Zrenjanin	3,500	Zrenjanin	KK Proleter Zrenjanin	1961
Dvorana Ivo Lola Ribar	3,000	Šibenik	KK Šibenka	1973
Dvorana Jazine	3,000	Zadar	KK Zadar	1968
Sala Gradski Park	2,500	Skopje	KK Rabotnički	1970
Hala Sportova Valjevo	2,500	Valjevo	KK Metalac Valjevo	1972

== See also ==
- List of indoor arenas in Bosnia and Herzegovina
- List of indoor arenas in Croatia
- List of indoor arenas in Kosovo
- List of indoor arenas in North Macedonia
- List of indoor arenas in Serbia
- List of indoor arenas in Slovenia
- List of indoor arenas in Europe
- List of indoor arenas by capacity
