= Aurora Chamorro =

Spanish swimmer (1954–2020)

Personal information
- Full name: Aurora Chamorro i Gual
- Born: 11 June 1954 Barcelona, Spain
- Died: 17 October 2020 (aged 66)

Sport
- Sport: Swimming

Aurora Chamorro i Gual (11 June 1954 – 17 October 2020) was a Spanish swimmer, top in her specialities between 1968 and 1974 in Spain.

Trained at the CN Poble Nou, she specialized in freestyle and butterfly speed trials, being the great Spanish dominator of the 1970s. She was champion of Catalonia on thirty occasions, among them, eleven titles in the 100 m butterfly and seven in 100 m freestyle. At the Spanish Championships, she won twenty-eight titles, excelling in the 100 m butterfly, 100 m freestyle, 4x100 m freestyle relay and 4x100 m medley relay. She also broke fourteen records in Catalonia and ten in Spain between 1969 and 1972. International with the Spanish swimming team on thirty-nine occasions, she participated in the 1970 European Aquatics Championships, the 1973 World Aquatics Championships and the 1972 Summer Olympics in Munich.
