= Antonia Real =

Spanish swimmer

Personal information
- Born: September 14, 1963 (age 62)

Sport
- Sport: Swimming

Antonia Real (born 14 September 1963) is a Spanish former freestyle swimmer who competed in the 1976 Summer Olympics.
