= Riccardo Targetti =

Italian swimmer (born 1952)

Personal information
- Nationality: Italian
- Born: Riccardo Guido Leonardo Targetti; April 15, 1952 (age 74) Milan, Italy
- Height: 189 cm (6 ft 2 in)
- Weight: 88 kg (194 lb)

Sport
- Sport: Swimming
Medal record
Representing Italy
Mediterranean Games
Gold medal – first place	1971 Izmir	4x200m freestyle relay
Bronze medal – third place	1971 Izmir	200m freestyle

Riccardo Targetti (born 15 April 1952) is an Italian former freestyle swimmer. He competed in two events at the 1972 Summer Olympics.

== Early life and career ==
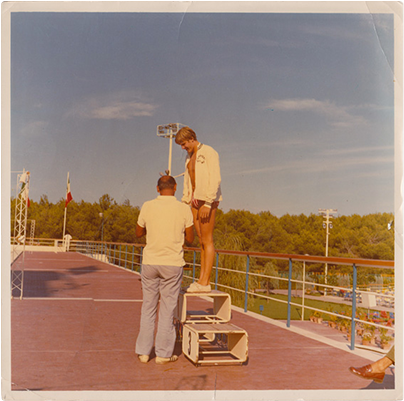
Riccardo Targetti at the 1972 Summer Olympics

In his youth, Targetti practiced competitive swimming, winning several Italian titles in freestyle swimming and participating in various prestigious competitions, including the 1972 Olympics in Munich.

== Personal life ==
Targetti was born and lives in Milan. Married to a Latin and Greek teacher, now an entrepreneur, he has a son who works in Los Angeles in the film industry and a daughter who is a doctor in Milan.

He is the Magistrate of the Public Prosecutor's Office. At the beginning of his career, he dealt with trials against organized crime and then with economic crimes (bankruptcies, false accounting, tax fraud, fraud to the detriment of the State). Over the years he has written many legal articles and is the author of some monographs on criminal law. Later, he devoted himself to writing fiction.
