= Roberto Pangaro =

Italian swimmer

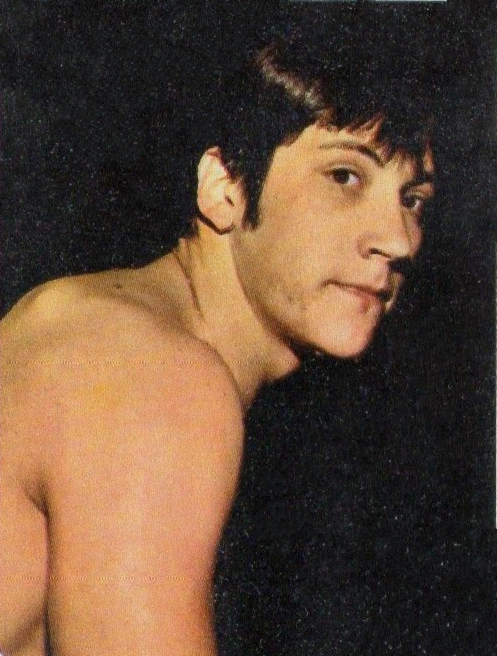

Personal information
- Born: 6 July 1950 (age 76) Trieste, Italy
- Height: 1.90 m (6 ft 3 in)
- Weight: 87 kg (192 lb)

Sport
- Sport: Swimming
Medal record
Representing Italy
World Championships
Bronze medal – third place	1975 Cali	4×100 m freestyle
European Championships
Silver medal – second place	1977 Jönköping	4×100 m freestyle
Mediterranean Games
Gold medal – first place	1971 Smirne	4×200 m freestyle
Gold medal – first place	1975 Algiers	4×100 m freestyle
Silver medal – second place	1971 Smirne	4×100 m freestyle
Bronze medal – third place	1971 Smirne	100 m freestyle
Bronze medal – third place	1975 Algiers	200 m freestyle

Roberto Pangaro (born 6 July 1950) is a retired Italian freestyle swimmer. He competed at the 1972 and 1976 Olympics in several 100 m and 200 events and reached the final in the 4 × 200 m freestyle relay in 1976. Pangaro was part of the Italian 4 × 100 m freestyle relay teams that won a bronze medal at the 1975 World Championships and a silver at the 1977 European Championships.
