= Jacques Leloup =

Belgian swimmer

Personal information
- Born: 28 April 1952 (age 74) Rocourt, Liège, Belgium

Sport
- Sport: Swimming

Jacques Leloup (born 28 April 1952) is a Belgian former butterfly swimmer. He competed in two events at the 1972 Summer Olympics.
