= Predrag Miloš =

Serbian swimmer

Olympic medal record

Representing Yugoslavia

Men's swimming

Mediterranean Games
Silver medal – second place	1975 Algiers	100m Backstroke
Silver medal – second place	1975 Algiers	200m Backstroke
Bronze medal – third place	1971 Izmir	100m Backstroke
Bronze medal – third place	1975 Algiers	4x100m Freestyle

Predrag Miloš (born 13 May 1955) is a Serbian former swimmer who competed in the 1972 Summer Olympics and in the 1976 Summer Olympics.

His twin brother Nenad Miloš is also a retired swimmer who has competed in multiple Olympics (1976, 1972, and 1982) -- each time without winning a single medal.
