= Mauro Calligaris =

Italian swimmer

Personal information
- Nationality: Italian
- Born: 6 May 1952 Trieste, Italy
- Died: 8 August 2000 (aged 48) Turin, Italy
- Height: 1.85 m (6 ft 1 in)
- Weight: 78 kg (172 lb)

Sport
- Sport: Swimming
- Strokes: Medley
- Club: Gruppo Sportivo Fiamme Oro

Mauro Calligaris (6 May 1952 – 8 August 2000) was an Italian swimmer who competed in the 400 m individual medley event at the 1972 Summer Olympics. His younger sister Novella was also an Olympic swimmer.

Calligaris was an athlete of the Gruppo Sportivo Fiamme Oro. After retiring from competitions, he worked as a swimming coach. He died in a traffic incident aged 48.
