= Vincenzo Finocchiaro =

Italian swimmer (1953–2019)

Personal information
- Born: 12 January 1953 Avola, Italy
- Died: 4 July 2019 (aged 66)

Sport
- Sport: Swimming

Vincenzo Finocchiaro (12 January 1953 – 4 July 2019) was an Italian swimmer. He competed in the men's 1500 metre freestyle at the 1972 Summer Olympics.
