= Angelo Tozzi =

Italian swimmer (born 1949)

Personal information
- Born: 1 January 1949 (age 77) Rome, Italy

Sport
- Sport: Swimming
Medal record
Representing Italy
Mediterranean Games
Silver medal – second place	1971 Izmir	4x100m medley relay
Bronze medal – third place	1971 Izmir	100m butterfly
Bronze medal – third place	1971 Izmir	200m butterfly

Angelo Tozzi (born 1 January 1949) is an Italian former butterfly swimmer. He competed at the 1968 Summer Olympics and the 1972 Summer Olympics. He also competed in the men's 200 metre butterfly event at the 1973 World Aquatics Championships held in Belgrade, Yugoslavia.
