= Peter Rosenkranz =

German swimmer

Personal information
- Born: 1 July 1953 (age 73) Sulzbach-Rosenberg, West Germany

Sport
- Sport: Swimming

Peter Rosenkranz (born 1 July 1953) is a German former swimmer. He competed in two events at the 1972 Summer Olympics.
