= Nenad Miloš =

Serbian swimmer

Personal information
- Born: May 13, 1955 (age 71) Zadar, Yugoslavia

Sport
- Sport: Swimming
Medal record
Representing Yugoslavia
Mediterranean Games
Gold medal – first place	1971 Izmir	100m Backstroke
Bronze medal – third place	1971 Izmir	4x100m Medley
Bronze medal – third place	1975 Algiers	100m Backstroke
Bronze medal – third place	1975 Algiers	4x100m Freestyle

Nenad Miloš (born 13 May 1955) is a Serbian-Croatian former swimmer who competed in the 1972 Summer Olympics, in the 1976 Summer Olympics, and in the 1980 Summer Olympics.

His twin brother Predrag Miloš is also a retired swimmer.
