= Vasil Dobrev (swimmer) =

Bulgarian swimmer

Personal information
- Born: 24 September 1947 (age 78) Sofia, PR Bulgaria

Sport
- Sport: Swimming

Vasil Dobrev (Bulgarian: Васил Добрев; born 24 September 1947) is a Bulgarian former butterfly swimmer. He competed in two events at the 1972 Summer Olympics.
