= Friðrik Guðmundsson (swimmer) =

Icelandic swimmer

Personal information
- Born: 4 April 1955 (age 71)

Sport
- Sport: Swimming

Friðrik Guðmundsson (born 4 April 1955) is an Icelandic former freestyle swimmer. He competed in two events at the 1972 Summer Olympics.
