= José Bas =

Spanish swimmer

Personal information
- Full name: José Bas Molina
- Born: 12 January 1952 (age 74)

Sport
- Sport: Swimming
Medal record
Men's swimming
Representing Spain
Mediterranean Games
Gold medal – first place	1971 İzmir	1500 m freestyle
Gold medal – first place	1975 Algiers	1500 m freestyle

José Bas Molina (Note: In this Spanish name, the first or paternal surname is Bas and the second or maternal family name is Molina.) (born 12 January 1952) is a Spanish former freestyle swimmer who competed in the 1976 Summer Olympics.
