= Dimitrios Theodoropoulos =

Greek swimmer

Personal information
- Born: 16 December 1954 (age 71)

Sport
- Sport: Swimming

Dimitrios Theodoropoulos (born 16 December 1954) is a Greek former swimmer. He competed in two events at the 1972 Summer Olympics.
