= François Deley =

Belgian swimmer

Personal information
- Born: 27 March 1956 (age 70) Ostend, Belgium

Sport
- Sport: Swimming

François Deley (born 27 March 1956) is a Belgian former butterfly, freestyle and medley swimmer. He competed at the 1972 Summer Olympics and the 1976 Summer Olympics.
