= 1975 Mediterranean Games =

7th edition of the Mediterranean Games

VII Mediterranean Games Algiers 1975
- Host city: Algiers, Algeria
- Nations: 15
- Athletes: 2,444
- Events: 160 in 19 sports
- Opening: 23 August 1975
- Closing: 6 September 1975
- Opened by: Houari Boumediene
- Main venue: Stade 5 Juillet 1962

The 1975 Mediterranean Games, officially known as the VII Mediterranean Games, and commonly known as Algiers 1975, were the 7th Mediterranean Games. The Games were held in Algiers, Algeria, from 23 August to 6 September 1975, where 2,444 athletes (2,095 men and 349 women) from 15 countries participated. There were a total of 160 medal events from 19 different sports.

== Participating nations ==
The following is a list of nations that participated in the 1975 Mediterranean Games:

- Algeria (314)
- Egypt (124)
- France (164)
- Greece (169)
- Italy (269)
- Lebanon (91)
- Libya (40)
- Malta (29)
- Monaco (4)
- Morocco (198)
- Spain (238)
- Syria (177)
- Tunisia (123)
- Turkey (204)
- Yugoslavia (300)

== Sports ==
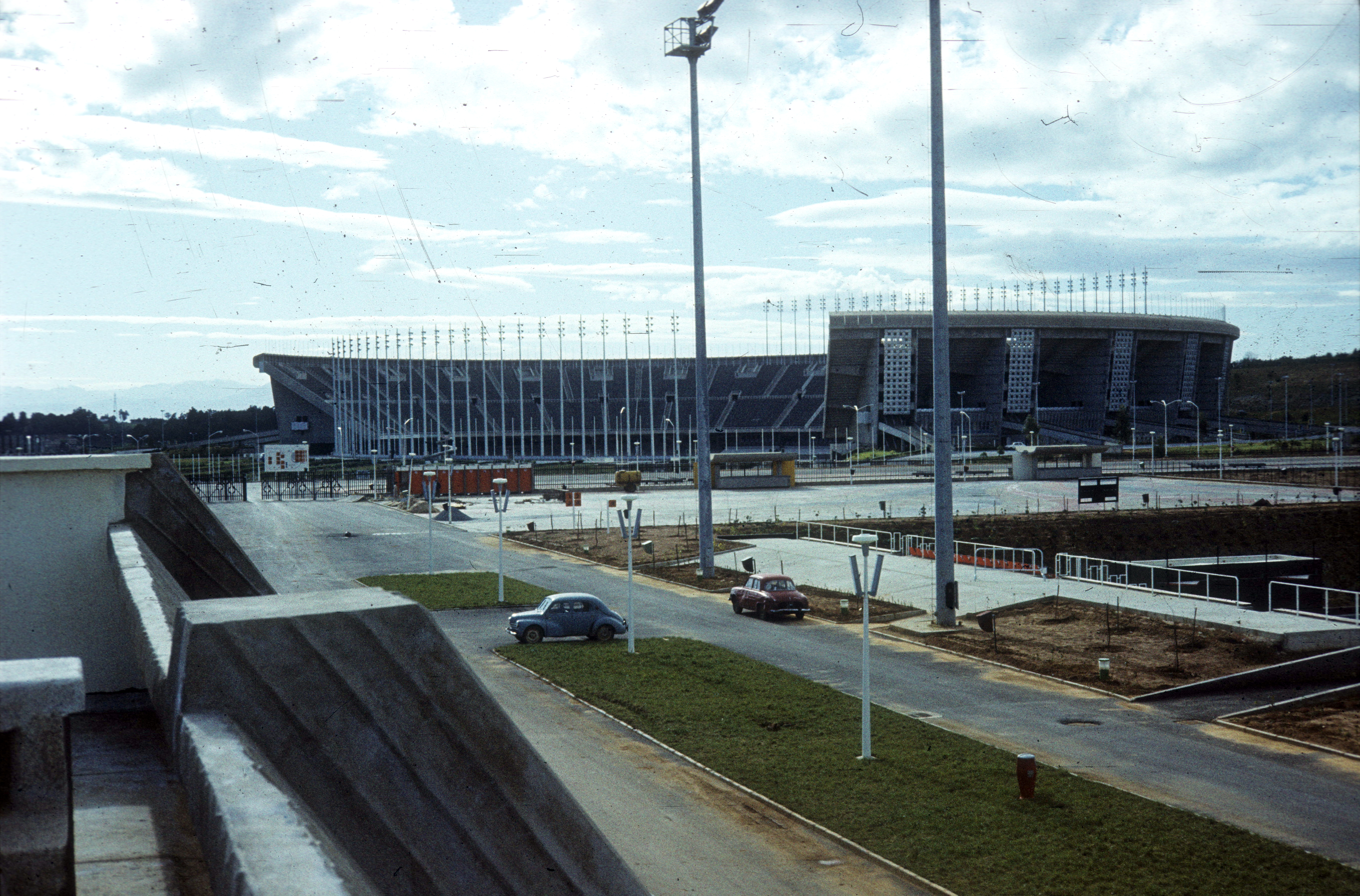
Stade du 5 Juillet host the Games

- Athletics (31)
- Basketball (1)
- Boxing (11)
- Cycling (6)
- Fencing (4)
- Football (1)
- Gymnastics (14)
- Handball (1)
- Judo (6)
- Sailing (3)
- Shooting (6)
- Swimming (24)
- Table tennis
- Tennis (2)
- Volleyball (2)
- Water polo (1)
- Weightlifting (18)
- Wrestling (20)

== Medal table ==
* Host nation (Algeria)

Rank	Nation	Gold	Silver	Bronze	Total
1	Italy	51	40	36	127
2	France	31	25	23	79
3	Yugoslavia	24	17	23	64
4	Spain	14	27	29	70
5	Turkey	12	11	8	31
6	Greece	9	12	16	37
7	Egypt	6	12	15	33
8	Algeria*	4	7	9	20
9	Syria	3	2	11	16
10	Tunisia	3	2	2	7
11	Lebanon	3	0	1	4
12	Morocco	0	4	4	8
13	Libya	0	1	2	3
Totals (13 entries)		160	160	179	499
