= Cycling at the 1972 Summer Olympics – Men's sprint =

Men's sprint at the Games of the XX Olympiad
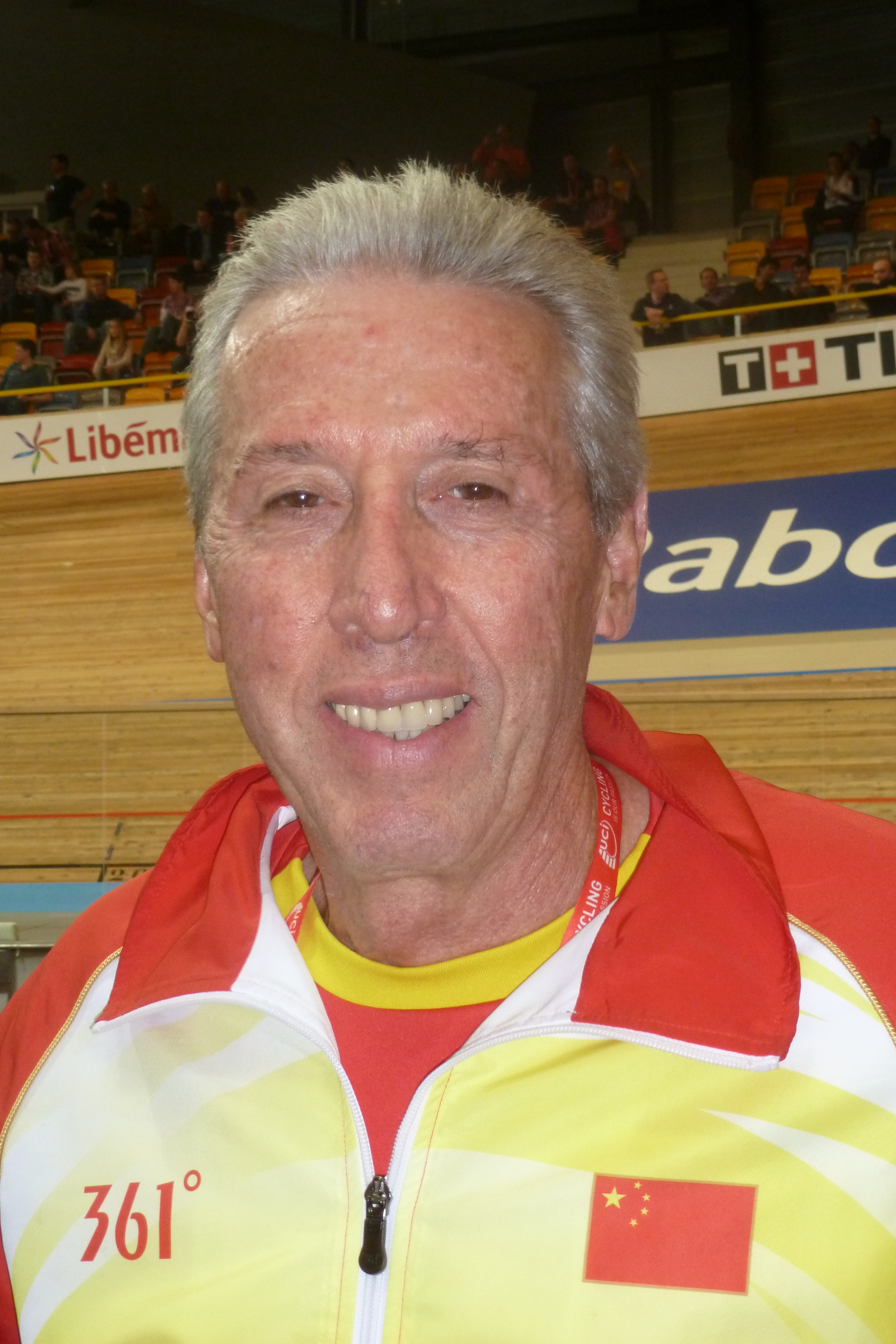
- Daniel Morelon (2011)
- Venue: Munich, West Germany
- Dates: 1–2 September 1972
- Competitors: 46 from 27 nations

Medalists
1st place, gold medalist(s)		Daniel Morelon; France
2nd place, silver medalist(s)		John Nicholson; Australia
3rd place, bronze medalist(s)		Omar Pkhakadze; Soviet Union

The men's sprint at the 1972 Summer Olympics in Munich, West Germany, was held on 1 to 2 September 1972. There were 51 entrants from 30 nations; 5 withdrawals left 46 competitors from 27 nations. Nations were limited to two cyclists each. The event was won by Daniel Morelon of France, successfully defending his 1968 title and becoming the first man to win three medals in the event (with his 1964 bronze). It was France's seventh gold medal in the event, most in the world. Silver went to John Nicholson of Australia, taking the nation's first medal in the men's sprint since 1956. Omar Pkhakadze, who had finished fourth in 1968, won the bronze this time for the Soviet Union's first medal in the event. Italy's six-Games medal streak was broken.

== Background ==
This was the 15th appearance of the event, which has been held at every Summer Olympics except 1904 and 1912. Two quarterfinalists from 1968 returned: gold medalist (and 1964 bronze medalist) Daniel Morelon of France and fourth-place finisher Omar Pkhakadze of the Soviet Union. Morelon was heavily favored to repeat, with three world championships and two Grand Prix de Paris wins since his 1968 gold medal.

The Bahamas and Malaysia each made their debut in the men's sprint; East Germany competed separately for the first time. France made its 15th appearance, the only nation to have competed at every appearance of the event.

== Competition format ==
This sprint competition involved a series of head-to-head matches. The 1972 competition involved ten rounds: six main rounds (first round, second round, 1/8 finals, quarterfinals, semifinals, and finals) as well as three repechages after the first three main rounds; the third repechage was a two-round repechage.

- First round: The 51 entrants were divided into 17 heats of 3 cyclists each. Withdrawals left some heats with only 2 competitors. The winner of each heat advanced directly to the second round (17 cyclists), while all other cyclists who competed were sent to the first repechage (29 cyclists).
- First repechage: The 29 cyclists were divided into 12 heats, each with 2 or 3 cyclists. The winner of each heat advanced to the second round (12 cyclists), while all others were eliminated (17 cyclists, including those who did not start).
- Second round: The 29 cyclists who advanced through the first round or first repechage were divided into 10 heats; all heats had 3 cyclists except heat 1, which had only 2. The winner of each heat advanced directly to the third round, the 1/8 finals (10 cyclists), while all others went to the second repechage (19 cyclists).
- Second repechage: The 19 cyclists from the second round were divided into 8 heats, with 2 or 3 cyclists per heat. Winners advanced to the 1/8 finals (8 cyclists), while all others were eliminated (11 cyclists).
- 1/8 finals: The 18 cyclists who advanced through the first two rounds (including repechages) competed in a 1/8 finals round. There were 6 heats in this round, with 3 cyclists in each. The top cyclist in each heat advanced to the quarterfinals (6 cyclists), while the other 2 in each heat went to the third repechage (12 cyclists).
- Third repechage: This was a two-round repechage. The repechage began with 4 heats of 3 cyclists each. The top cyclist in each heat advanced to the second round, while the other 2 cyclists in each heat were eliminated. The second round of this repechage featured 2 heats of 2 cyclists each, with the winners advancing to the quarterfinals and the losers eliminated.
- Quarterfinals: Beginning with the quarterfinals, all matches were one-on-one competitions and were held in best-of-three format. There were 4 quarterfinals, with the winner of each advancing to the semifinals and the loser eliminated.
- Semifinals: The two semifinals provided for advancement to the gold medal final for winners and to the bronze medal final for losers.
- Finals: Both a gold medal final and a bronze medal final were held.

== Records ==
The records for the sprint are 200 metre flying time trial records, kept for the qualifying round in later Games as well as for the finish of races.

World record	Omar Pkhakadze (URS)	10.61	Mexico City, Mexico	22 October 1967
Olympic record	Leijn Loevesijn (NED)	10.66	Mexico City, Mexico	18 October 1968

No new world or Olympic records were set during the competition.

== Schedule ==
All times are Central European Time (UTC+1)

Date	Time	Round
Friday, 1 September 1972	11:19; 12:29; 15:59; 16:50; 20:00; 21:11	Round 1 First repechage Round 2 Second repechage 1/8 finals Third repechage heats Third repechage finals
Saturday, 2 September 1972	17:58; 20:51; 21:52	Quarterfinals; Semifinals; Final

== Results ==
=== First round ===
==== First round heat 1 ====
Rank	Cyclist	Nation	Time	Notes
1	Daniel Morelon	France	11.71	Q
2	Hector Edwards	Barbados	–	R
3	Suriya Chiarasapawong	Thailand	–	R

==== First round heat 2 ====
Rank	Cyclist	Nation	Time	Notes
1	Serhiy Kravtsov	Soviet Union	11.83	Q
2	Taworn Tarwan	Thailand	–	R
3	Shue Ming-fa	Chinese Taipei	–	R

==== First round heat 3 ====
Rank	Cyclist	Nation	Time	Notes
1	Ivan Kučírek	Czechoslovakia	11.78	Q
2	Winston Attong	Trinidad and Tobago	–	R
3	Kensley Reece	Barbados	–	R

==== First round heat 4 ====
Rank	Cyclist	Nation	Time	Notes
1	Gérard Quintyn	France	11.40	Q
2	Yoshikazu Cho	Japan	–	R
3	Jeffrey Spencer	United States	–	R

==== First round heat 5 ====
Rank	Cyclist	Nation	Time	Notes
1	Ezio Cardi	Italy	11.92	Q
2	Félix Suárez	Spain	–	R
3	Daud Ibrahim	Malaysia	–	R

==== First round heat 6 ====
Rank	Cyclist	Nation	Time	Notes
1	John Nicholson	Australia	11.20	Q
2	Ed McRae	Canada	–	R
–	Mabruk Ilmarimi Mah	Lebanon	DNS	

==== First round heat 7 ====
Rank	Cyclist	Nation	Time	Notes
1	Peter van Doorn	Netherlands	11.58	Q
2	Yaichi Numata	Japan	–	R
–	Ahmed Abdussal Gariani	Lebanon	DNS	

==== First round heat 8 ====
Rank	Cyclist	Nation	Time	Notes
1	Omar Pkhakadze	Soviet Union	11.64	Q
2	Andrzej Bek	Poland	–	R
3	Honson Chin	Jamaica	–	R

==== First round heat 9 ====
Rank	Cyclist	Nation	Time	Notes
1	Jürgen Geschke	East Germany	11.52	Q
2	Jairo Díaz	Colombia	–	R
–	Behrouz Rahbar	Iran	DNS	

==== First round heat 10 ====
Rank	Cyclist	Nation	Time	Notes
1	Karl Köther	West Germany	11.30	Q
2	Peder Pedersen	Denmark	–	R
–	Gholamhosain Koohi	Iran	DNS	

==== First round heat 11 ====
Rank	Cyclist	Nation	Time	Notes
1	Vladimír Vačkář	Czechoslovakia	11.89	Q
2	Klaas Balk	Netherlands	–	R
3	Carlos Galeano	Colombia	–	R

==== First round heat 12 ====
Rank	Cyclist	Nation	Time	Notes
1	Massimo Marino	Italy	11.83	Q
2	Roger Young	United States	–	R
3	Geoffrey Burnside	Bahamas	–	R

==== First round heat 13 ====
Rank	Cyclist	Nation	Time	Notes
1	Dieter Berkmann	West Germany	11.71	Q
2	Leslie King	Trinidad and Tobago	–	R
3	Arturo Cambroni	Mexico	–	R

==== First round heat 14 ====
Rank	Cyclist	Nation	Time	Notes
1	Niels Fredborg	Denmark	12.16	Q
2	Maurice Hugh-Sam	Jamaica	–	R
–	Harry Kent	New Zealand	DNS	

==== First round heat 15 ====
Rank	Cyclist	Nation	Time	Notes
1	Benedykt Kocot	Poland	11.44	Q
2	Geoff Cooke	Great Britain	–	R
3	Manu Snellinx	Belgium	–	R

==== First round heat 16 ====
Rank	Cyclist	Nation	Time	Notes
1	Carlos Reybaud	Argentina	11.50	Q
2	Werner Otto	East Germany	–	R
3	Ernie Crutchlow	Great Britain	–	R

==== First round heat 17 ====
Rank	Cyclist	Nation	Time	Notes
1	Robert Maveau	Belgium	Unknown	Q
2	Víctor Limba	Argentina	–	R
3	Neville Hunte	Guyana	–	R

=== First repechage ===
==== First repechage heat 1 ====
Rank	Cyclist	Nation	Time	Notes
1	Jeffrey Spencer	United States	12.46	Q
2	Hector Edwards	Barbados	–	

==== First repechage heat 2 ====
Rank	Cyclist	Nation	Time	Notes
1	Leslie King	Trinidad and Tobago	11.62	Q
2	Werner Otto	East Germany	–	
3	Suriya Chiarasapawong	Thailand	–	

==== First repechage heat 3 ====
Rank	Cyclist	Nation	Time	Notes
1	Neville Hunte	Guyana	11.54	Q
2	Taworn Tarwan	Thailand	–	
3	Manu Snellinx	Belgium	–	

==== First repechage heat 4 ====
Rank	Cyclist	Nation	Time	Notes
1	Yoshikazu Cho	Japan	11.17	Q
2	Félix Suárez	Spain	–	
3	Shue Ming-fa	Chinese Taipei	–	

==== First repechage heat 5 ====
Rank	Cyclist	Nation	Time	Notes
1	Ernie Crutchlow	Great Britain	11.41	Q
2	Jairo Díaz	Colombia	–	
3	Winston Attong	Trinidad and Tobago	–	

==== First repechage heat 6 ====
Rank	Cyclist	Nation	Time	Notes
1	Roger Young	United States	11.99	Q
2	Kensley Reece	Barbados	–	

==== First repechage heat 7 ====
Rank	Cyclist	Nation	Time	Notes
1	Klaas Balk	Netherlands	12.02	Q
2	Maurice Hugh-Sam	Jamaica	–	
3	Daud Ibrahim	Malaysia	–	

==== First repechage heat 8 ====
Rank	Cyclist	Nation	Time	Notes
1	Honson Chin	Jamaica	11.90	Q
2	Yaichi Numata	Japan	–	

==== First repechage heat 9 ====
Rank	Cyclist	Nation	Time	Notes
1	Ed McRae	Canada	Unknown	Q
2	Víctor Limba	Argentina	–	

==== First repechage heat 10 ====
Rank	Cyclist	Nation	Time	Notes
1	Andrzej Bek	Poland	11.86	Q
2	Arturo Cambroni	Mexico	–	

==== First repechage heat 11 ====
Rank	Cyclist	Nation	Time	Notes
1	Peder Pedersen	Denmark	11.34	Q
2	Geoffery Burnside	Bahamas	–	

==== First repechage heat 12 ====
Rank	Cyclist	Nation	Time	Notes
1	Geoff Cooke	Great Britain	12.27	Q
2	Carlos Galeano	Colombia	–	

=== Second round ===
==== Second round heat 1 ====
Rank	Cyclist	Nation	Time	Notes
1	Daniel Morelon	France	12.26	Q
2	Neville Hunte	Guyana	–	R

==== Second round heat 2 ====
Rank	Cyclist	Nation	Time	Notes
1	Serhiy Kravtsov	Soviet Union	11.35	Q
2	Geoff Cooke	Great Britain	–	R
3	Jeffrey Spencer	United States	–	R

==== Second round heat 3 ====
Rank	Cyclist	Nation	Time	Notes
1	Leslie King	Trinidad and Tobago	11.77	Q
2	Ivan Kučírek	Czechoslovakia	–	R
3	Roger Young	United States	–	R

==== Second round heat 4 ====
Rank	Cyclist	Nation	Time	Notes
1	Gérard Quintyn	France	Unknown	Q
2	Carlos Reybaud	Argentina	–	R
3	Klaas Balk	Netherlands	–	R

==== Second round heat 5 ====
Rank	Cyclist	Nation	Time	Notes
1	Vladimír Vačkář	Czechoslovakia	11.83	Q
2	Ezio Cardi	Italy	–	R
3	Andrzej Bek	Poland	–	R

==== Second round heat 6 ====
Rank	Cyclist	Nation	Time	Notes
1	John Nicholson	Australia	11.92	Q
2	Niels Fredborg	Denmark	–	R
3	Honson Chin	Jamaica	–	R

==== Second round heat 7 ====
Rank	Cyclist	Nation	Time	Notes
1	Peder Pedersen	Denmark	11.69	Q
2	Dieter Berkmann	West Germany	–	R
3	Peter van Doorn	Netherlands	–	R

==== Second round heat 8 ====
Rank	Cyclist	Nation	Time	Notes
1	Robert Maveau	Belgium	11.98	Q
2	Omar Pkhakadze	Soviet Union	–	R
3	Ed McRae	Canada	–	R

==== Second round heat 9 ====
Rank	Cyclist	Nation	Time	Notes
1	Jürgen Geschke	East Germany	11.53	Q
2	Benedykt Kocot	Poland	–	R
3	Ernie Crutchlow	Great Britain	–	R

==== Second round heat 10 ====
Rank	Cyclist	Nation	Time	Notes
1	Karl Köther	West Germany	11.37	Q
2	Yoshikazu Cho	Japan	–	R
3	Massimo Marino	Italy	–	R

=== Second repechage ===
==== Second repechage heat 1 ====
Rank	Cyclist	Nation	Time	Notes
1	Ivan Kučírek	Czechoslovakia	12.27	Q
2	Jeffrey Spencer	United States	–	

==== Second repechage heat 2 ====
Rank	Cyclist	Nation	Time	Notes
1	Klaas Balk	Netherlands	11.68	Q
2	Benedykt Kocot	Poland	–	

==== Second repechage heat 3 ====
Rank	Cyclist	Nation	Time	Notes
1	Ezio Cardi	Italy	11.93	Q
2	Roger Young	United States	–	

==== Second repechage heat 4 ====
Rank	Cyclist	Nation	Time	Notes
1	Andrzej Bek	Poland	11.87	Q
2	Dieter Berkmann	West Germany	–	

==== Second repechage heat 5 ====
Rank	Cyclist	Nation	Time	Notes
1	Niels Fredborg	Denmark	11.96	Q
2	Honson Chin	Jamaica	–	

==== Second repechage heat 6 ====
Rank	Cyclist	Nation	Time	Notes
1	Omar Pkhakadze	Soviet Union	11.56	Q
2	Ernie Crutchlow	Great Britain	–	
3	Neville Hunte	Guyana	–	

==== Second repechage heat 7 ====
Rank	Cyclist	Nation	Time	Notes
1	Peter van Doorn	Netherlands	11.74	Q
2	Yoshikazu Cho	Japan	–	
3	Ed McRae	Canada	–	

==== Second repechage heat 8 ====
Rank	Cyclist	Nation	Time	Notes
1	Massimo Marino	Italy	11.68	Q
2	Carlos Reybaud	Argentina	–	
3	Geoff Cooke	Great Britain	–	

=== 1/8 finals ===
==== 1/8 final 1 ====
Rank	Cyclist	Nation	Time	Notes
1	Daniel Morelon	France	12.26	Q
2	Niels Fredborg	Denmark	–	R
3	Peter van Doorn	Netherlands	–	R

==== 1/8 final 2 ====
Rank	Cyclist	Nation	Time	Notes
1	Klaas Balk	Netherlands	11.48	Q
2	Andrzej Bek	Poland	–	R
3	Serhiy Kravtsov	Soviet Union	–	R

==== 1/8 final 3 ====
Rank	Cyclist	Nation	Time	Notes
1	Massimo Marino	Italy	11.40	Q
2	Robert Maveau	Belgium	–	R
3	Gérard Quintyn	France	–	R

==== 1/8 final 4 ====
Rank	Cyclist	Nation	Time	Notes
1	Omar Pkhakadze	Soviet Union	11.43	Q
2	Karl Köther	West Germany	–	R
3	Vladimír Vačkář	Czechoslovakia	–	R

==== 1/8 final 5 ====
Rank	Cyclist	Nation	Time	Notes
1	Jürgen Geschke	East Germany	11.42	Q
2	Ezio Cardi	Italy	–	R
3	Leslie King	Trinidad and Tobago	–	R

==== 1/8 final 6 ====
Rank	Cyclist	Nation	Time	Notes
1	John Nicholson	Australia	11.67	Q
2	Ivan Kučírek	Czechoslovakia	–	R
3	Peder Pedersen	Denmark	–	R

=== Third repechage heats ===
==== Third repechage heat 1 ====
Rank	Cyclist	Nation	Time	Notes
1	Niels Fredborg	Denmark	11.91	Q
2	Ivan Kučírek	Czechoslovakia	–	
3	Gérard Quintyn	France	–	

==== Third repechage heat 2 ====
Rank	Cyclist	Nation	Time	Notes
1	Peter van Doorn	Netherlands	11.59	Q
2	Robert Maveau	Belgium	–	
3	Ezio Cardi	Italy	–	

==== Third repechage heat 3 ====
Rank	Cyclist	Nation	Time	Notes
1	Karl Köther	West Germany	11.40	Q
2	Leslie King	Trinidad and Tobago	–	
3	Serhiy Kravtsov	Soviet Union	–	

==== Third repechage heat 4 ====
Rank	Cyclist	Nation	Time	Notes
1	Vladimír Vačkář	Czechoslovakia	11.46	Q
2	Peder Pedersen	Denmark	–	
3	Andrzej Bek	Poland	–	

=== Third repechage finals ===
==== Third repechage final 1 ====
Rank	Cyclist	Nation	Time	Notes
1	Niels Fredborg	Denmark	11.59	Q
2	Karl Köther	West Germany	–	

==== Third repechage heat 2 ====
Rank	Cyclist	Nation	Time	Notes
1	Peter van Doorn	Netherlands	11.61	Q
2	Vladimír Vačkář	Czechoslovakia	–	

=== Quarterfinals ===
==== Quarterfinal 1 ====
Rank	Cyclist	Nation	Race 1		Race 2		Race 3		Notes
Rank	Cyclist	Nation	Rank	Time	Rank	Time	Rank	Time	Notes
1	Daniel Morelon	France	11.78	1	11.78	1	—N/a		Q
2	Peter van Doorn	Netherlands	–	2	–	2	—N/a		

==== Quarterfinal 2 ====
Rank	Cyclist	Nation	Race 1		Race 2		Race 3		Notes
Rank	Cyclist	Nation	Rank	Time	Rank	Time	Rank	Time	Notes
1	John Nicholson	Australia	11.68	1	11.59	1	—N/a		Q
2	Niels Fredborg	Denmark	–	2	–	2	—N/a		

==== Quarterfinal 3 ====
Rank	Cyclist	Nation	Race 1		Race 2		Race 3		Notes
Rank	Cyclist	Nation	Rank	Time	Rank	Time	Rank	Time	Notes
1	Klaas Balk	Netherlands	–	2	11.58	1	11.47	1	Q
2	Jürgen Geschke	East Germany	11.63	1	–	2	–	2	

==== Quarterfinal 4 ====
Rank	Cyclist	Nation	Race 1		Race 2		Race 3		Notes
Rank	Cyclist	Nation	Rank	Time	Rank	Time	Rank	Time	Notes
1	Omar Pkhakadze	Soviet Union	11.34	1	–	2	11.65	1	Q
2	Massimo Marino	Italy	–	2	11.47	1	–	2	

=== Semifinals ===
==== Semifinal 1 ====
Rank	Cyclist	Nation	Race 1		Race 2		Race 3		Notes
Rank	Cyclist	Nation	Rank	Time	Rank	Time	Rank	Time	Notes
1	Daniel Morelon	France	11.55	1	11.49	1	—N/a		Q
2	Klaas Balk	Netherlands	–	2	–	2	—N/a		B

==== Semifinal 2 ====
Rank	Cyclist	Nation	Race 1		Race 2		Race 3		Notes
Rank	Cyclist	Nation	Rank	Time	Rank	Time	Rank	Time	Notes
1	John Nicholson	Australia	11.30	1	11.47	1	—N/a		Q
2	Omar Pkhakadze	Soviet Union	–	2	–	2	—N/a		B

=== Finals ===
==== Bronze medal match ====
Rank	Cyclist	Nation	Race 1		Race 2		Race 3	
Rank	Cyclist	Nation	Rank	Time	Rank	Time	Rank	Time
3rd place, bronze medalist(s)	Omar Pkhakadze	Soviet Union	–	2	12.12	1	11.34	1
4	Klaas Balk	Netherlands	11.62	1	–	2	–	2

==== Final ====
Rank	Cyclist	Nation	Race 1		Race 2		Race 3	
Rank	Cyclist	Nation	Rank	Time	Rank	Time	Rank	Time
1st place, gold medalist(s)	Daniel Morelon	France	11.69	1	11.25	1	—N/a	
2nd place, silver medalist(s)	John Nicholson	Australia	–	2	–	2	—N/a	

== Final classification ==
Rank	Cyclist	Nation
1st place, gold medalist(s)	Daniel Morelon	France
2nd place, silver medalist(s)	John Nicholson	Australia
3rd place, bronze medalist(s)	Omar Pkhakadze	Soviet Union
4	Klaas Balk	Netherlands
5	Niels Fredborg	Denmark
5	Jürgen Geschke	East Germany
5	Massimo Marino	Italy
5	Peter van Doorn	Netherlands
9	Karl Köther	West Germany
9	Vladimír Vačkář	Czechoslovakia
9	Ivan Kučírek	Czechoslovakia
9	Robert Maveau	Belgium
9	Leslie King	Trinidad and Tobago
9	Peder Pedersen	Denmark
15	Gérard Quintyn	France
15	Ezio Cardi	Italy
15	Serhiy Kravtsov	Soviet Union
15	Andrzej Bek	Poland
19	Jeffrey Spencer	United States
19	Benedykt Kocot	Poland
19	Roger Young	United States
19	Dieter Berkmann	West Germany
19	Honson Chin	Jamaica
19	Ernie Crutchlow	Great Britain
19	Yoshikazu Cho	Japan
19	Carlos Reybaud	Argentina
27	Neville Hunte	Guyana
27	Ed McRae	Canada
27	Geoff Cooke	Great Britain
30	Hector Edwards	Barbados
30	Werner Otto	East Germany
30	Taworn Tarwan	Thailand
30	Félix Suárez	Spain
30	Jairo Díaz	Colombia
30	Kensley Reece	Barbados
30	Maurice Hugh-Sam	Jamaica
30	Yaichi Numata	Japan
30	Arturo Cambroni	Mexico
30	Geoffery Burnside	Bahamas
30	Carlos Galeano	Colombia
30	Víctor Limba	Argentina
42	Suriya Chiarasapawong	Thailand
42	Shue Ming-fa	Chinese Taipei
42	Winston Attong	Trinidad and Tobago
42	Daud Ibrahim	Malaysia
42	Manu Snellinx	Belgium
—	Ahmed Abdussal Gariani	Lebanon
—	Mabruk Ilmarimi Mah	Lebanon
—	Behrouz Rahbar	Iran
—	Gholamhosain Koohi	Iran
—	Harry Kent	New Zealand
