= Colombia at the 1972 Summer Olympics =

- IOC code: COL
- NOC: Colombian Olympic Committee

in Munich
- Competitors: 59 (55 men and 4 women) in 8 sports
- Flag bearer: Alfonso Pérez
- Medals Ranked 31st: Gold 0 Silver 1 Bronze 2 Total 3

Summer Olympics appearances (overview)
- 1932; 1936; 1948; 1952; 1956; 1960; 1964; 1968; 1972; 1976; 1980; 1984; 1988; 1992; 1996; 2000; 2004; 2008; 2012; 2016; 2020; 2024

Colombia competed at the 1972 Summer Olympics in Munich, West Germany. 59 competitors, 55 men and 4 women, took part in 39 events in 8 sports.

Colombia claimed its first-ever Olympic medals, with one silver in Shooting and two bronzes in Boxing.

== Medalists ==
=== Silver ===
- Helmut Bellingrodt – Shooting, Men's Running Game Target

=== Bronze ===
- Clemente Rojas – Boxing, Men's Featherweight
- Alfonso Pérez – Boxing, Men's Lightweight

== Boxing ==
Men's Light Flyweight (– 48 kg)

- Prudencio Cardona
  - First Round – Lost to Rafael Carbonell (CUB), 0:5

Men's Flyweight (– 51 kg)

- Calixto Pérez
  - First Round – Bye
  - Second Round – Defeated Martin Vargas (CHL), 5:0
  - Third Round – Defeated Tim Dement (USA), 5:0
  - Quarterfinals – Lost to Georgi Kostadinov (BUL), 2:3

Men's Light Middleweight (– 71 kg)

- Bonifacio Avila
  - First Round – Bye
  - Second Round – Lost to Dieter Kottysch (FRG), TKO-2

== Cycling ==
Ten cyclists represented Colombia in 1972.

Individual road race

- Miguel Samacá – 9th place
- Fernando Cruz – 26th place
- Juan Morales – 66th place
- Fabio Acevedo – did not finish (→ no ranking)

Team time trial

- Fabio Acevedo
- Fernando Cruz
- Henry Cuevas
- Miguel Samacá

Sprint

- Jairo Díaz
- Carlos Galeano

1000m time trial

- Jairo Rodríguez
  - Final – 1:10.86 (→ 23rd place)

Tandem

- Jairo Díaz and Rafael Narváez → 14th place

Individual pursuit

- Luis Díaz

== Diving ==
Men's 3m Springboard

- Salim Barjum – 310.86 points (→ 26th place)

Men's 10m Platform

- Diego Henao – 264.27 points (→ 26th place)

== Football ==
=== Men's team competition ===
- Preliminary Round (Group D)
  - Lost to Poland (1–5)
  - Lost to East Germany (1–6)
  - Defeated Ghana (3–1) → did not advance, 10th place over-all
- Team Roster
  - Armando Acosta
  - Henry Caicedo
  - Álvaro Calle
  - Ernesto Díaz
  - Fabio Espinosa
  - Domingo González
  - Dumas Guette
  - Carlos Lugo
  - Gerardo Moncada
  - Luis Montano
  - Jaime Morón
  - Willington Ortiz
  - Silvio Quintero
  - Vicente Revellón
  - Rafael Reyes
  - Antonio Rivas
  - Orlando Rivas
  - Álvaro Santamaría
  - Ángel Torres

== Shooting ==
Ten male shooters represented Colombia in 1972.

25 m pistol

- Luis Colina
- Guillermo Martínez

50 m pistol

- Gilberto Fernández
- Jorge Henao

50 m rifle, three positions

- Jaime Callejas
- Alfonso Rodríguez

50 m rifle, prone

- Alfonso Rodríguez
- Jaime Callejas

50 m running target

- Helmut Bellingrodt
- Hanspeter Bellingrodt

Skeet

- Gerardo González
- Manuel González

== See also ==
- Sports in Colombia
