= Belgium at the 1972 Summer Olympics =

- IOC code: BEL
- NOC: Belgian Olympic Committee

in Munich
- Competitors: 88 (82 men and 6 women) in 14 sports
- Flag bearer: Gaston Roelants
- Medals Ranked 29th: Gold 0 Silver 2 Bronze 0 Total 2

Summer Olympics appearances (overview)
- 1900; 1904; 1908; 1912; 1920; 1924; 1928; 1932; 1936; 1948; 1952; 1956; 1960; 1964; 1968; 1972; 1976; 1980; 1984; 1988; 1992; 1996; 2000; 2004; 2008; 2012; 2016; 2020; 2024

Other related appearances
- 1906 Intercalated Games

Belgium competed at the 1972 Summer Olympics in Munich, West Germany. 88 competitors, 82 men and 6 women, took part in 51 events in 14 sports.

== Medalists ==
Belgium finished in 29th position in the final medal rankings, with two silver medals.

=== Silver ===
- Emiel Puttemans – Athletics, Men's 10,000 metres
- Karel Lismont – Athletics, Men's Marathon

== Archery ==
In the first modern archery competition at the Olympics, Belgium entered three men. Their highest placing competitor was Robert Cogniaux, who missed a medal by 22 points.

Men's Individual Competition:

- Robert Cogniaux – 2445 points (4th place)
- Andre Baeyens – 2383 points (18th place)
- Jos Daman – 2365 points (23rd place)

== Athletics ==
Men's 800 metres

- Herman Mignon
  - Heat – 1:47.5
  - Semifinals – 1:49.7 (→ did not advance)

Men's 1500 metres

- Herman Mignon
  - Heat – 3:44.2
  - Semifinals – 3:41.7
  - Final – 3:39.1 (→ 6th place)
- Edgard Salvé
  - Heat – 3:42.1 (→ did not advance)
- André de Hertoghe
  - Heat – 3:44.6 (→ did not advance)

Men's 5000 metres

- Willy Polleunis
  - Heat – 13:52.6 (→ did not advance)
- René Goris
  - Heat – 13:57.8 (→ did not advance)

== Cycling ==
Fourteen cyclists represented Belgium in 1972.

Individual road race

- Freddy Maertens – 13th place
- Gustaaf Hermans – 45th place
- Lucien De Brauwere – 59th place
- Frans Van Looy – did not finish (→ no ranking)

Team time trial

- Ludo Delcroix
- Gustaaf Hermans
- Gustaaf Van Cauter
- Louis Verreydt

Sprint

- Robert Maveau
- Manu Snellinx

1000m time trial

- Robert Maveau
  - Final – 1:08.94 (→ 14th place)

Tandem

- Manu Snellinx and Noël Soetaert → 5th place

Individual pursuit

- Wilfried Wesemael

Individual pursuit

- Leon Daelemans
- Roger De Beukelaer
- Alex Van Linden
- Wilfried Wesemael

== Fencing ==
One female fencer represented Belgium in 1972.

Women's foil

- Claudine le Comte

== Hockey ==
Men's Team Competition

- Preliminary Round (Group A)
  - Lost to West Germany (1–5)
  - Drew with Argentina (1-1)
  - Defeated France (1–0)
  - Lost to Spain (0–1)
  - Lost to Malaysia (2–4)
  - Defeated Uganda (2–0)
  - Lost to Pakistan (1–3)
- Classification Match
  - 9th/10th place: Lost to New Zealand (1–2) → 10th place
- Team Roster
  - Armand Solie
  - Carl-Eric Vanderborght
  - Charly Bouvy
  - Daniel Dupont
  - Eric Stoupel
  - Guy Miserque
  - Jean Toussaint
  - Jean-André Zembsch
  - Jean-Claude Moraux
  - Jean-François Gilles
  - Jean-Marie Buisset
  - Marc Legros
  - Michel De Saedeleer
  - Michel Deville
  - Patrick Gillard
  - Philippe Collin
  - Raoul Ronsmans

== Rowing ==
Men's Coxed Pairs

- Paul De Weert, Wilfried Van Herck and Guy Defraigne
  - Heat – 8:08.51
  - Repechage – 8:16.26 (→ did not advance)

== Sailing ==
- Jacques Rogge – Finn Class 14th place.

== Shooting ==
Six male shooters represented Belgium in 1972.

50 m pistol

- André Zoltan

50 m rifle, three positions

- Frans Lafortune

50 m rifle, prone

- Frans Lafortune
- Robert Houman

Trap

- Guy Rénard

Skeet

- Francis Cornet
- Chris Binet
