= Republic of China at the 1972 Summer Olympics =

- Flag of the Republic of China
- IOC code: ROC
- NOC: Republic of China Olympic Committee (Note: See Chinese Taipei Olympic Committee#History.)

in Munich
- Competitors: 21 (15 men, 6 women) in 10 sports
- Flag bearer: Chi Cheng
- Medals: Gold 0 Silver 0 Bronze 0 Total 0

Summer Olympics appearances (overview)
- 1956; 1960; 1964; 1968; 1972; 1976–1980; 1984; 1988; 1992; 1996; 2000; 2004; 2008; 2012; 2016; 2020; 2024

Other related appearances
- China (1952–pres.); Chinese Taipei (1956–pres.)

The Republic of China (Taiwan) competed at the 1972 Summer Olympics in Munich for the last time at a Summer Olympics as the "Republic of China". The ROC would not return to the Summer Olympics until 1984 and under the name "Chinese Taipei" due to objections by the People's Republic of China over the political status of Taiwan.

The PRC, amid the height of the Cultural Revolution, boycotted the Olympics due to the ROC participation under the name "Republic of China". 21 competitors, 15 men and 6 women, took part in 41 events in 10 sports.

== Archery ==
In the first modern archery competition at the Olympics, the Republic of China entered only one woman.

Women's:

- Shue Meei-Shya - 2026 points (38th place)

== Athletics ==
=== Track events ===
Athlete	Event	Round 1		Quarterfinal		Semifinal		Final	
Athlete	Event	Result	Rank	Result	Rank	Result	Rank	Result	Rank
Su Wen-Ho	Men's 100 m	10.8	7 (h5)	Did not advance					
Su Wen-Ho	Men's 200 m	21.55	5 (h5)	21.47	5 (h5)	Did not advance			
Lee Chung-Ping	Men's 110 m hurdles	14.98	6 (h4)	Did not advance					
Lee Chung-Ping	Men's 400 m hurdles	52.61	6 (h3)	Did not advance					
Lee Chung-Ping, Su Wen-Ho, Chen Chin-Lung, Chen Ming-Chih	Men's 4 × 100 m relay	41.78	7 (h2)	Did not advance					
Lee Chiu-Hsia	Women's 800 m	2:11.8	8 (h4)	Did not advance					
Lee Chiu-Hsia	Women's 1500 m	4:37.2	9 (h1)	Did not advance					

=== Field events ===
Athlete	Event	Qualification		Final	
Athlete	Event	Result	Rank	Result	Rank
Chen Chin-Lung	Men's long jump	6.79 m	—	Did not advance	
Chen Ming-Chih	Men's triple jump	14.73 m	—	Did not advance	
Wu Yu-Chih	Women's high jump	0.00 m	—	Did not advance	
Lin Chun-Yu	Women's long jump	5.50 m	—	Did not advance	
Lin Chun-Yu	Women's pentathlon	3676 points		28th place	

Note: Chi Cheng was listed as an alternate member for the athletics team but did not compete in any events.

== Boxing ==
Bantamweight:

- Wang Chee-Yen

1. 1/16-Final - defeated Manoochehr Bahmani of Iran (3 - 2)
2. 1/8-Final - lost to George Turpin of Great Britain

== Cycling ==
One cyclist represented the Republic of China in 1972.

Individual road race

- Shue Ming-fa — did not finish (→ no ranking)

1000m time trial

- Shue Ming-fa — 1:14.05 (→ 27th place)

Sprint

- Shue Ming-fa

1. Preliminary Round — lost to Sergei Kravtsov of Soviet Union and Taworn Tarwan of Thailand
2. Preliminary Round, repêchage — Lost to Yoshikazu Cho of Japan and Felix Suarez of Spain

== Judo ==
Lightweight:

- Cheng Chi-Hsiang

1. Pool A - lost to Takao Kawaguchi of Japan
2. Repêchage Pool - defeated Han Sung-Chul of South Korea
3. Repêchage Pool - lost to Bakhaavaa Buidaa of Mongolia

Welterweight:

- Wang Jong-She

1. Pool A - defeated William McGregor of Canada
2. Pool A - lost to Toyokazu Nomura of Japan
3. Repêchage Pool - lost to Antal Hetényi of Hungary

Middleweight:

- Chang Ping-Ho

1. Pool A - defeated Raymond Coulibaly of Mali
2. Pool A - lost to Jean-Paul Coche of France

Light heavyweight:

- Juang Jen-Wuh

1. Pool B - defeated Epigmenio Exiga of Mexico
2. Pool B - lost to Chiaki Ishii of Brazil

Open Category:

- Juang Jen-Wuh

1. Pool A - lost to Pavle Bajetić of Yugoslavia

== Sailing ==
Finn:

- Chen Shiu-Hsiung - 235.0 (35th place)

== Shooting ==
One male shooter represented Taiwan in 1972.

300 m rifle, three positions

- Wu Tao-yan - 1085 points (30th place)

50 m rifle, three positions

- Wu Tao-yan - 1101 points (51st place)

50 m rifle, prone

- Wu Tao-yan - 591 points (41st place)

== Swimming ==
Women's 100 m freestyle:

- Hsu Yue-Yun - Heat: 1:04.77 (did not advance)

Women's 200 m freestyle:

- Hsu Yue-Yun - Heat: 2:20.17 (did not advance)

Women's 400 m freestyle:

- Hsu Yue-Yun - Heat: 4:58.57 (did not advance)

Women's400 m individual medley:

- Hsu Yue-Yun - did not compete

Women's 100 m breaststroke

- Lie Yue-Hwan - 1:25.47 (did not advance)

Women's 200 m breaststroke

- Lie Yue-Hwan - 3:04.74 (did not advance)

Men's 100 m butterfly:

- Hsu Tung-Hsiung - did not compete

Men's 200 m butterfly:

- Hsu Tung-Hsiung - 2:16,35

Men's 200 m individual medley:

- Hsu Tung-Hsiung - 2:18.34 (did not advance)

Men's 400 m individual medley:

- Hsu Tung-Hsiung - 5:09.56 (did not advance)

== Weightlifting ==
Featherweight:

- Chen Kue-Sen - 327.5 kg (10th place)

== Wrestling ==
Freestyle –57 kg:

- Sheu Jine-Shiong

1. Round 1 - lost to Nicolae Dumitru of Romania (4 - 0)
2. Round 2 - lost to George Hatziioannidis of Greece (4 - 0)
