= Cycling at the 1972 Summer Olympics – Men's tandem =

Men's cycling tandem at the Games of the XX Olympiad
- Venue: Olympic Velodrome, Munich
- Date: 3–4 September 1972
- Competitors: 28 from 14 nations

Medalists
1st place, gold medalist(s)		Igor Tselovalnikov, Vladimir Semenets	Soviet Union
2nd place, silver medalist(s)		Jürgen Geschke, Werner Otto	East Germany
3rd place, bronze medalist(s)		Andrzej Bek, Benedykt Kocot	Poland

These are the official results of the Men's Tandem Race at the 1972 Summer Olympics in Munich, West Germany held on 3 to 4 September 1972. There were 28 participants from 14 countries.

== Competition format ==
This tandem bicycle competition involved a series of head-to-head matches. The 1972 competition involved six rounds: four main rounds (first round, quarterfinals, semifinals, and finals) as well as a two-round repechage after the first round.

- First round: The 14 teams were divided into 7 heats of 2 cyclists each. The winner of each heat advanced directly to the quarterfinal (7 teams); the loser went to the repechage (7 teams).
- Repechage: This was a two-round repechage. The repechage began with 3 heats of 2 or 3 teams each. The top team in each heat advanced to the second round, while the other team or teams in each heat were eliminated. The second round of this repechage featured a single heats of 3 teams, with the winner advancing to the quarterfinals and the losers eliminated.
- Quarterfinals: Beginning with the quarterfinals, all matches were one-on-one competitions and were held in best-of-three format. There were 4 quarterfinals, with the winner of each advancing to the semifinals and the loser eliminated.
- Semifinals: The two semifinals provided for advancement to the gold medal final for winners and to the bronze medal final for losers.
- Finals: Both a gold medal final and a bronze medal final were held.

== Results ==
=== First round ===
==== First round heat 1 ====
Rank	Cyclists	Nation	Time	Notes
1	Jürgen Geschke; Werner Otto	East Germany	11.66	Q
2	Geoff Cooke; David Rowe	Great Britain	–	R

==== First round heat 2 ====
Rank	Cyclists	Nation	Time	Notes
1	Jürgen Barth; Rainer Müller	West Germany	11.27	Q
2	Manu Snellinx; Noël Soetaert	Belgium	–	R

==== First round heat 3 ====
Rank	Cyclists	Nation	Time	Notes
1	Daniel Morelon; Pierre Trentin	France	10.42	Q
2	Yoshikazu Cho; Yaichi Numata	Japan	–	R

==== First round heat 4 ====
Rank	Cyclists	Nation	Time	Notes
1	Vladimir Semenets; Igor Tselovalnikov	Soviet Union	10.37	Q
2	Jeffrey SpencerRalph Therrio	United States	–	R

==== First round heat 5 ====
Rank	Cyclists	Nation	Time	Notes
1	Klaas Balk; Peter van Doorn	Netherlands	10.55	Q
2	Jairo Díaz; Rafael Narváez	Colombia	–	R

==== First round heat 6 ====
Rank	Cyclists	Nation	Time	Notes
1	Andrzej Bek; Benedykt Kocot	Poland	10.56	Q
2	Giorgio Rossi; Dino Verzini	Italy	–	R

==== First round heat 7 ====
Rank	Cyclists	Nation	Time	Notes
1	Ivan Kučírek; Vladimír Popelka	Czechoslovakia	10.97	Q
2	Honson Chin; Howard Fenton	Jamaica	–	R

=== Repechage heats ===
==== Repechage heat 1 ====
Rank	Cyclists	Nation	Time	Notes
1	Geoff Cooke; David Rowe	Great Britain	Unknown	Q
2	Yoshikazu Cho; Yaichi Numata	Japan	–	

==== Repechage heat 2 ====
Rank	Cyclists	Nation	Time	Notes
1	Giorgio Rossi; Dino Verzini	Italy	11.20	Q
2	Honson Chin; Howard Fenton	Jamaica	–	

==== Repechage heat 3 ====
Rank	Cyclists	Nation	Time	Notes
1	Manu Snellinx; Noël Soetaert	Belgium	10.97	Q
2	Jeffrey SpencerRalph Therrio	United States	–	
3	Jairo Díaz; Rafael Narváez	Colombia	–	

=== Repechage final ===
Rank	Cyclists	Nation	Time	Notes
1	Manu Snellinx; Noël Soetaert	Belgium	10.94	Q
2	Giorgio Rossi; Dino Verzini	Italy	–	
3	Geoff Cooke; David Rowe	Great Britain	–	

=== Quarterfinals ===
==== Quarterfinal 1 ====
Rank	Cyclists	Nation	Race 1		Race 2		Race 3		Notes
Rank	Cyclists	Nation	Rank	Time	Rank	Time	Rank	Time	Notes
1	Jürgen Geschke; Werner Otto	East Germany	10.75	1	10.80	1	—N/a		Q
2	Manu Snellinx; Noël Soetaert	Belgium	–	2	–	2	—N/a		

==== Quarterfinal 2 ====
Rank	Cyclists	Nation	Race 1		Race 2		Race 3		Notes
Rank	Cyclists	Nation	Rank	Time	Rank	Time	Rank	Time	Notes
1	Andrzej Bek; Benedykt Kocot	Poland	10.57	1	10.46	1	—N/a		Q
2	Jürgen Barth; Rainer Müller	West Germany	–	2	–	2	—N/a		

==== Quarterfinal 3 ====
Rank	Cyclists	Nation	Race 1		Race 2		Race 3		Notes
Rank	Cyclists	Nation	Rank	Time	Rank	Time	Rank	Time	Notes
1	Daniel Morelon; Pierre Trentin	France	10.69	1	10.62	1	—N/a		Q
2	Klaas Balk; Peter van Doorn	Netherlands	–	2	–	2	—N/a		

==== Quarterfinal 4 ====
Rank	Cyclists	Nation	Race 1		Race 2		Race 3		Notes
Rank	Cyclists	Nation	Rank	Time	Rank	Time	Rank	Time	Notes
1	Vladimir Semenets; Igor Tselovalnikov	Soviet Union	10.66	1	10.53	1	—N/a		Q
2	Ivan Kučírek; Vladimír Popelka	Czechoslovakia	–	2	–	2	—N/a		

=== Semifinals ===
==== Semifinal 1 ====
Rank	Cyclists	Nation	Race 1		Race 2		Race 3		Notes
Rank	Cyclists	Nation	Rank	Time	Rank	Time	Rank	Time	Notes
1	Jürgen Geschke; Werner Otto	East Germany	10.54	1	10.91	1	—N/a		Q
2	Andrzej Bek; Benedykt Kocot	Poland	–	2	–	2	—N/a		B

==== Semifinal 2 ====
Rank	Cyclists	Nation	Race 1		Race 2		Race 3		Notes
Rank	Cyclists	Nation	Rank	Time	Rank	Time	Rank	Time	Notes
1	Vladimir Semenets; Igor Tselovalnikov	Soviet Union	10.66	1	10.51	1	—N/a		Q
2	Daniel Morelon; Pierre Trentin	France	–	2	–	2	—N/a		B

=== Finals ===
==== Bronze medal match ====
Rank	Cyclists	Nation	Race 1		Race 2		Race 3	
Rank	Cyclists	Nation	Rank	Time	Rank	Time	Rank	Time
3rd place, bronze medalist(s)	Andrzej Bek; Benedykt Kocot	Poland	10.76	1	10.67	1	—N/a	
4	Daniel Morelon; Pierre Trentin	France	–	2	–	2	—N/a	

==== Final ====
Rank	Cyclists	Nation	Race 1		Race 2		Race 3	
Rank	Cyclists	Nation	Rank	Time	Rank	Time	Rank	Time
1st place, gold medalist(s)	Vladimir Semenets; Igor Tselovalnikov	Soviet Union	–	2	10.52	1	10.60	1
2nd place, silver medalist(s)	Jürgen Geschke; Werner Otto	East Germany	10.68	1	–	2	–	2

== Final classification ==
RANK	NAME CYCLISTS	NATION
	Igor Tselovalnikov / Vladimir Semenets	Soviet Union
	Jürgen Geschke / Werner Otto	East Germany
	Andrzej Bek / Benedykt Kocot	Poland
4.	Daniel Morelon / Pierre Trentin	France
5.	Manu Snellinx / Noël Soetaert	Belgium
6.	Jürgen Barth / Rainer Müller	West Germany
7.	Klaas Balk / Peter van Doorn	Netherlands
8.	Ivan Kučírek / Vladimír Popelka	Czechoslovakia
9.	Dino Verzini / Giorgio Rossi	Italy
10.	David Rowe / Geoff Cooke	Great Britain
11.	Honson Chin / Howard Fenton	Jamaica
12.	Yaichi Numata / Yoshikazu Cho	Japan
13.	Jeffrey Spencer / Ralph Therrio	United States
14.	Jairo Díaz / Rafael Narváez	Colombia
