= Cycling at the 1972 Summer Olympics – Men's track time trial =

Men's track time trial at the Games of the XX Olympiad
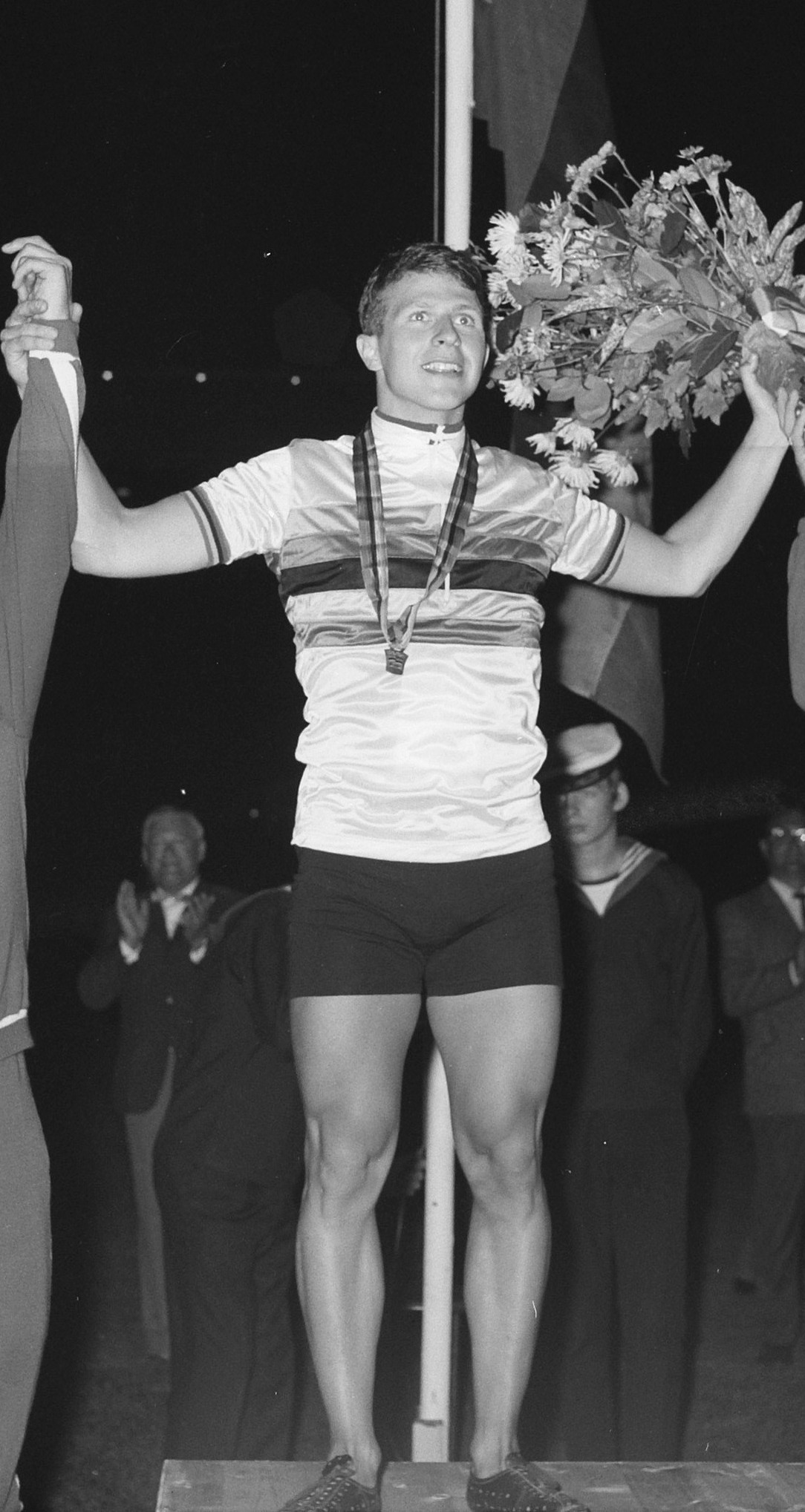
- Niels Fredborg (1967)
- Venue: Radstadion
- Date: 31 August 1972
- Competitors: 31 from 31 nations
- Winning time: 1:06.44

Medalists
1st place, gold medalist(s)		Niels Fredborg; Denmark
2nd place, silver medalist(s)		Daniel Clark; Australia
3rd place, bronze medalist(s)		Jürgen Schütze; East Germany

The men's track time trial at the 1972 Summer Olympics in Munich, West Germany, was held on 31 August 1972. There were 31 participants from 31 nations, with each nation limited to one cyclist. One additional cyclist was entered but did not start. The event was won by Niels Fredborg of Denmark, the nation's first victory in the men's track time trial since Willy Hansen won in 1928. Denmark tied Italy and Australia for second-most gold medals in the event at 2 (behind Italy at 3). Fredborg was just the third man to win multiple medals in the event; he would become the only one to earn a third, in 1976. Daniel Clark's silver medal was Australia's first medal in the event since 1952. Jürgen Schütze's bronze was the first track time trial medal for East Germany as a separate nation.

== Background ==
This was the 11th appearance of the event, which had previously been held in 1896 and every Games since 1928. It would be held every Games until being dropped from the programme after 2004. All three of the medalists from 1968 returned (gold medalist Pierre Trentin of France, silver medalist Niels Fredborg of Denmark, and bronze medalist Janusz Kierzkowski of Poland), along with seventh-place finisher Jocelyn Lovell of Canada. Fredborg had also won the 1967, 1968, and 1970 world championships; he was the favorite to win the Olympic competition this time. The 1971 world champion, Eduard Rapp of the Soviet Union, was also competing.

The Bahamas and Iran each made their debut in the men's track time trial. France and Great Britain each made their 11th appearance, having competed at every appearance of the event.

== Competition format ==
The event was a time trial on the track, with each cyclist competing separately to attempt to achieve the fastest time. Each cyclist raced one kilometre from a standing start.

== Records ==
The following were the world and Olympic records prior to the competition.

World record	Pierre Trentin (FRA)	1:03.91	Mexico City, Mexico	17 October 1968
Olympic record	Pierre Trentin (FRA)	1:03.91	Mexico City, Mexico	17 October 1968

No new world or Olympic records were set during the competition.

== Schedule ==
All times are Central European Time (UTC+1)

Date	Time	Round
Thursday, 31 August 1972	20:00	Final

== Results ==
Rank	Cyclist	Nation	428 m	713 m	Time	Speed (km/h)
1st place, gold medalist(s)	Niels Fredborg	Denmark	30.29	47.76	1:06.44	54.184
2nd place, silver medalist(s)	Daniel Clark	Australia	30.00	47.95	1:06.87	53.835
3rd place, bronze medalist(s)	Jürgen Schütze	East Germany	29.98	47.67	1:07.02	53.715
4	Karl Köther	West Germany	30.65	48.46	1:07.21	53.563
5	Janusz Kierzkowski	Poland	29.82	47.82	1:07.22	53.555
6	Dimo Angelov Tonchev	Bulgaria	30.09	48.15	1:07.55	53.293
7	Christian Brunner	Switzerland	29.30	47.38	1:07.71	53.167
8	Eduard Rapp	Soviet Union	29.74	47.75	1:07.73	53.152
9	Ezio Cardi	Italy	30.32	48.31	1:07.80	53.097
10	Pierre Trentin	France	30.51	48.59	1:07.85	53.058
11	Peter van Doorn	Netherlands	30.45	48.24	1:08.09	52.871
12	Steven Woznick	United States	30.20	48.72	1:08.56	52.508
13	Anton Tkáč	Czechoslovakia	31.06	49.17	1:08.78	52.340
14	Robert Maveau	Belgium	30.10	48.60	1:08.94	52.219
15	Jocelyn Lovell	Canada	30.81	49.33	1:09.03	52.151
16	Harry Kent	New Zealand	30.60	48.98	1:09.10	52.098
17	Michael Bennett	Great Britain	31.03	49.81	1:09.45	51.835
18	Harald Bundli	Norway	30.78	49.84	1:09.72	51.635
19	Leslie King	Trinidad and Tobago	31.07	49.70	1:09.96	51.457
20	Takafumi Matsuda	Japan	30.56	49.04	1:10.00	51.428
21	Fernando Jiménez	Argentina	30.61	49.24	1:10.30	51.209
22	Neville Hunte	Guyana	31.49	50.04	1:10.48	51.078
23	Jairo Rodríguez	Colombia	31.71	50.42	1:10.86	50.804
24	Arturo Cambroni	Mexico	31.48	50.47	1:11.54	50.321
25	Suriya Chiarasapawong	Thailand	32.00	51.38	1:12.53	49.634
26	Howard Fenton	Jamaica	30.85	50.54	1:12.64	49.559
27	Shue Ming-fa	Chinese Taipei	31.77	51.67	1:14.05	48.615
28	Behrouz Rahbar	Iran	33.04	53.35	1:15.39	47.751
29	Daud Ibrahim	Malaysia	32.88	53.53	1:16.27	47.200
30	Laurence Burnside	Bahamas	33.53	55.39	1:20.31	44.826
—	Hector Edwards	Barbados	—		DNF	—
—	Ahmed Abdussal Gariani	Lebanon	—		DNS	—
