= 1971 Asian Cycling Championships =

- Venue: Singapore
- Date: 23–30 October 1971
- Velodrome: Farrer Park Stadium

The 1971 Asian Cycling Championships took place at the Farrer Park Stadium in Singapore from 23 to 30 October 1971.

== Medal summary ==
=== Road ===
Event	Gold	Silver	Bronze
Individual road race 100 km	Kwon Jung-hyun; South Korea	Panya Saecing; Thailand	Omar Haji Saad; Malaysia
Individual road race 200 km	Panya Saecing; Thailand	Yoshinori Sugawara; Japan	Kazumasa Yamamoto; Japan
Team road race	Philippines; Maximo Junta; Rodrigo Arzadon; Fermin Zabala	Thailand; Panya Saecing; Sataporn Kantasa-ard; Pinit Koeykorpkeo	Malaysia; Rosli Abdul Kadir; Omar Haji Saad; Jamil Ishak
Team time trial	South Korea; Yoo Jae-myung; Jung Chong-jin; Jeon Sung-kook; Lee Am-ak	Philippines; Ricafrente Dionisio; Cesar Filosopo; Maximo Junta; Fermin Zabala	Japan; Takeo Ota; Yoshinori Sugawara; Hiroyasu Abe; Kazumasa Yamamoto

=== Track ===
Event	Gold	Silver	Bronze
1 km time trial	Yaichi Numata; Japan	Benjamin Evangelista; Philippines	Daud Ibrahim; Malaysia
Individual pursuit	Kazumasa Yamamoto; Japan	Kwon Jung-hyun; South Korea	Romin Salamante; Philippines
800 m mass start	Shue Ming-fa; Taiwan	Yoshikazu Cho; Japan	Rodolfo Guaves; Philippines
1600 m mass start	Shue Ming-fa; Taiwan	Kim Kwang-sun; South Korea	Suriya Saechia; Thailand
4800 m mass start	Cheng Ming-fu; Taiwan	Julius Enagan; Philippines	Cherdchoo Sukkato; Thailand
10000 m mass start	Daud Ibrahim; Malaysia	Benjamin Evangelista; Philippines	Kenichi Ono; Japan
1600 m team time trial	Japan; Masayuki Hasebe; Kazumasa Yamamoto; Yaichi Numata; Toshio Saito	Philippines; Benjamin Evangelista; Rodolfo Guaves; Romin Salamante; Roberto Quirimit	Thailand; Cherdchoo Sukkato; Vitaya Poontharikapan; Suriya Saechia; Taworn Tarwan
Team pursuit	Japan; Takeo Ota; Masayuki Hasebe; Yaichi Numata; Kenichi Ono	South Korea; Suk Choon-bong; Kim Kwang-sun; Ro Hae-soo; Kwon Jung-kook	Thailand; Suriya Saechia; Vitaya Poontharikapan; Cherdchoo Sukkato; Pinit Koeykorpkeo

== Medal table ==
Rank	Nation	Gold	Silver	Bronze	Total
1	Japan	4	2	3	9
2	Taiwan	3	0	0	3
3	South Korea	2	3	0	5
4	Philippines	1	5	2	8
5	Thailand	1	2	4	7
6	Malaysia	1	0	3	4
Totals (6 entries)		12	12	12	36
