= Jamaica at the 1972 Summer Olympics =

- IOC code: JAM
- NOC: Jamaica Olympic Association

in Munich
- Competitors: 33 (21 men, 12 women) in 6 sports
- Flag bearer: Lennox Miller
- Medals Ranked 43rd: Gold 0 Silver 0 Bronze 1 Total 1

Summer Olympics appearances (overview)
- 1948; 1952; 1956; 1960; 1964; 1968; 1972; 1976; 1980; 1984; 1988; 1992; 1996; 2000; 2004; 2008; 2012; 2016; 2020; 2024

Other related appearances
- British West Indies (1960 S)

Jamaica competed at the 1972 Summer Olympics in Munich, West Germany. 33 competitors, 21 men and 12 women, took part in 27 events in 6 sports.

== Medalists ==
Medal	Name	Sport	Event	Date
Bronze	Lennox Miller	Athletics	Men's 100 metres	1 September

== Athletics ==
Men's 800 metres

- Byron Dyce

- Heat – 1:48.0 (→ did not advance)

Men's 1500 metres

- Byron Dyce

- Heat – 3:45.9 (→ did not advance)

Men's 4 × 100 m Relay

- Michael Fray, Donald Quarrie, Lennox Miller, and Horace Levy

- Heat – DNS (→ did not advance)

== Cycling ==
Six cyclists represented Jamaica in 1972.

Individual road race

- Howard Fenton – did not finish (→ no ranking)
- Michael Lecky – did not finish (→ no ranking)
- Radcliffe Lawrence – did not finish (→ no ranking)
- Xavier Mirander – did not finish (→ no ranking)

Sprint

- Honson Chin
- Maurice Hugh-Sam

1000m time trial

- Howard Fenton

- Final – 1:12.64 (→ 26th place)

Tandem

- Honson Chin and Howard Fenton → 11th place

Individual pursuit

- Michael Lecky

Team pursuit

- Radcliffe Lawrence
- Howard Fenton
- Maurice Hugh-Sam
- Michael Lecky

== Diving ==
Women's 3m Springboard

- Betsy Sullivan – 210.39 points (→ 29th place)
