= Tselovalnikov =

Tselovalnikov (feminine: Tselovalnikova) is a Russian language surname derived from the occupation of tselovalnik.

The surname may refer to:

- Igor Tselovalnikov (1944–1986), Soviet Olympic cyclist
- Vladislav Tselovalnikov (born 1991), Russian football goalkeeper
