= Karl Köther =

Karl Köther may refer to:

- Karl Köther (cyclist, born 1905), a German cyclist who competed at the 1928 Summer Olympics
- Karl Köther (cyclist, born 1942), a German cyclist who competed at the 1972 Summer Olympics, and son of the above
