= Kother =

Kother or Köther is a German surname. Notable people with the surname include:

- Karl Köther (cyclist, born 1905), German cyclist
- Karl Köther (cyclist, born 1942), German cyclist, son of the above
- Rosemarie Gabriel (née Kother in 1956), German swimmer
