= Li Yuhuan =

Li Yuhuan may refer to following individuals of which name in Chinese character can be transliterated to Hanyu Pinyin:

- 李玉環 (Pinyin: Lǐ Yù-huán; born 1958), Taiwanese swimmer
- 李禹煥 (Pinyin: Lǐ Yǔ-huàn; born 1936), Korean minimalist painter
