= Guette =

Guette or Guetté is a French surname.

== List of people with the surname ==
- Clémence Guetté (born 1991), French politician
- Dumas Guette (born 1952), Colombian former footballer
- Henriette Guette, retired French slalom canoeist

== See also ==
- Guetta
- Sainte-Colombe-sur-Guette
