= Rafael Reyes (disambiguation) =

Rafael Reyes may refer to:

- Rafael Reyes, president of Colombia 1904-1909
- Rafael Reyes (footballer), Colombian footballer who competed in the 1972 Summer Olympics
- Rafael Reyes (artist), San Diego "cholo goth" artist and musician
- Rafael Reyes (wrestler), Dominican-born luchador in Mexico

== Places ==
- Rafael Reyes, Cundinamarca, Colombia
