= Vladimir Semenets =

Soviet cyclist

Personal information
- Born: 9 January 1950 (age 76) Volsk, Russian SFSR, Soviet Union
- Height: 1.80 m (5 ft 11 in)
- Weight: 80 kg (176 lb)

Sport
- Sport: Cycling
- Club: Dynamo Kyiv
Medal record
Representing the Soviet Union
Olympic Games
Gold medal – first place	1972 Munich	Tandem sprint
World championships
Silver medal – second place	1973 San Sebastian	Tandem sprint
Silver medal – second place	1974 Montreal	Tandem sprint
Silver medal – second place	1977 San Cristobal	Tandem sprint
Bronze medal – third place	1970 Leicester	Team pursuit
Bronze medal – third place	1976 Monteroni	Tandem sprint

Vladimir Ivanovich Semenets (Russian: Владимир Иванович Семенец; born 9 January 1950) is a retired Soviet cyclist. He won a gold medal in the 2000 m tandem sprint at the 1972 Summer Olympics, riding with Igor Tselovalnikov. In the following five years he won three silver and one bronze medals in the tandem sprint at world championships.

He was born in Russia but then moved to Ukraine and graduated from the Institute of Physical Education in Kyiv. Since 1973 he lives in Saint Petersburg and works as a cycling coach and lector at the Lesgaft University of Physical Education. He was awarded the Order of the Badge of Honour.
