= Fernando Jiménez =

Fernando Jiménez may refer to:

- Fernando Jiménez (cyclist) (born 1949), Argentine Olympic cyclist
- Fernando Jiménez (sport shooter), Puerto Rican Olympic shooter
- Fernando Volio Jiménez (1924–1996), Costa Rican politician
