= Guetta =

Guetta (Hebrew: גויטא or גואטה) is a Sephardic Jewish surname, typically originating from the ancient name of the Castilian town of Huete (Guete). Alternatively, it may be derived from the Goeta tribe of western Libya, or as a nickname derived from the Arabic word for "sharp/cutting/piercing". Variants of the name include Gueta, Guita, Guitta, Gweta, and Quita.

== People with the name ==
Notable people with the surname include:

- Bernard Guetta (born 1951), French politician
- Cathy Guetta (born 1967), French socialite
- David Guetta (born 1967), French DJ, record producer and songwriter
- Eliran Guetta (born 1975), Israeli basketball player
- Isaac Guetta (1777–1857), Talmudic scholar
- Tzuri Gueta (born 1968), Israeli jewelry and fabric designer
- Snir Gueta (born 1988), retired Israeli professional footballer
- Yigal Guetta (born 1966), Israeli politician

== See also ==
- Guette, a surname
- Guitta, nickname of Thiago Mendes Rocha (born, 1987), Brazilian futsal player
- Muisca, a pre-Columbian people of today's Colombia, used the word gueta
  - Muisca numerals: gueta = 20
  - Muisca calendar
