= Cogniaux =

Surname

Cogniaux is a surname. Notable people with the surname include:

- Alfred Cogniaux (1841–1916), Belgian botanist
- Robert Cogniaux (born 1934), Belgian Olympic archer
