= Ahmed Abdussal Gariani =

Lebanese cyclist

Personal information
- Born: Beirut, Lebanon

Cycling career
- Sport: Cycling
- Discipline: Track cycling
- Role: Rider
- Rider type: Sprinter

Ahmed Abdussal Gariani is a Lebanese track cyclist who represented his country at international competitions.

Gariani won the bronze medal in the sprint event at the 1971 Mediterranean Games in İzmir, Turkey, behind the Italians Ezio Cardi and Marino Massimo. He was on the start list to compete at the 1972 Summer Olympics in the men's sprint event and 1 km time trial event, but did not start. He competed in the amateur sprint event at the 1981 UCI Track Cycling World Championships in Brno, Czechoslovakia. He got a puncture in the first round. After a restart he lost from Rainier Valkenburg from the Netherlands.
