= Geschke =

Geschke is a German surname. Notable people with the surname include:

- Charles Geschke (1939–2021), American co-founder of Adobe, Inc.
- Jürgen Geschke (born 1943), German track cyclist
- Simon Geschke (born 1986), German road cyclist, son of Jürgen
