= Harry Kent (cyclist) =

New Zealand cyclist (1947–2021)

Personal information
- Born: Harry Dale Kent; 11 March 1947 Upper Hutt, New Zealand
- Died: 24 August 2021 (aged 74)
- Height: 1.83 m (6 ft 0 in)

Sport
- Country: New Zealand
- Sport: Cycling
Medal record
Men's cycling
Representing New Zealand
British Commonwealth Games
Gold medal – first place	1970 Edinburgh	1 km time trial

Harry Dale Kent (11 March 1947 – 24 August 2021) was a New Zealand track cyclist. He was the first New Zealander to win a gold medal in cycling at the Commonwealth Games, as well as the first cyclist from the country to medal at the UCI Track Cycling World Championships.

== Early life ==
Kent was born in Upper Hutt near Wellington on 11 March 1947. He was of Waitaha descent, and his family lived in Upper Hutt from the time his grandfather settled there. His father, Huia Jim Kent, fought during World War II.

== Career ==
At the 1970 British Commonwealth Games, Kent won the gold medal in the men's 1 km time trial, with his time of 1:08.69 establishing a new Commonwealth Games record. It was his country's first gold medal in cycling at the Commonwealth Games, and was one of two golds that New Zealand won at that year's Games (the other was by Bruce Biddle in the road race). He finished in fourth place in the sprint and sixth in the 10 mile scratch race. Although Kent won Match A in the semifinals of the former event, he lost the next two matches against Gordon Johnson, who at one point forced Kent up against the guard rails.

Several weeks later, Kent competed at the UCI Track Cycling World Championships in Leicester. He secured silver in the men's 1 km time trial, narrowly missing out on gold to Niels Fredborg by 0.4 seconds. This was New Zealand's first medal at the world track championships. In recognition of his achievements that year, Kent was named New Zealand Sportsman of the Year, and was conferred the Lonsdale Cup.

Kent competed at the 1972 Summer Olympics in the men's 1 km time trial but did not start in the men's sprint. He finished 16th in the former event with a time of 1:09.10.

== Later life ==
After retiring from professional cycling, Kent returned to Upper Hutt and managed his family's garden nursery. He ran a fruit and vegetable market, named Trentham Village Market, and acquired the nickname of the "Flying Florist". Kent was elected to the Upper Hutt City Council and served for nine years during the 1970s and 1980s. He was one of the two guests of honour when the Wellington Velodrome was reopened in December 2003, together with Sarah Ulmer.

Kent ran again as city councillor in 2016, after engaging in a protracted legal dispute with the council over the commercial assessment of his business. He ultimately finished last among twenty candidates who were vying for ten seats. He was honoured by Cycling New Zealand that same year on its Wall of Fame at the Cambridge Avantidrome.

== Personal life ==
Kent had four children: Heidi, Harry James Dale, Josephine and Michelle. Harry James helped his father manage Trentham Village Market. Kent spent his entire life in the suburb of Trentham in Upper Hutt.

Kent died on 24 August 2021. He was 74, and was in poor health as a result of two strokes he suffered in the years leading up to his death.

Awards
Preceded by Jeff Julian	Lonsdale Cup of the New Zealand Olympic Committee; 1970	Succeeded by Les Mills
