= Tang Kam Man =

Hong Kong cyclist

Personal information
- Native name
- Traditional Chinese: 鄧錦文
- Simplified Chinese: 邓锦文
Transcriptions
Standard Mandarin
- Hanyu Pinyin: Dèng Jǐnwén
- Wade–Giles: Têng⁴ Chin³ Wên²
Yue: Cantonese
- Jyutping: Dang6 Gam2 Man4
- Born: 5 June 1955 (age 70)

Sport
- Sport: Cycling

Tang Kam Man (traditional Chinese: 鄧錦民; simplified Chinese: 邓锦民; born 5 June 1955) is a Hong Kong former cyclist and coach. He took part in three events at the 1976 Summer Olympics. Tang competed at the 1971 Asian Cycling Championships in Singapore, the 1973 Asian Cycling Championships in Japan, and the 1974 UCI Road World Championships in Montreal. He coached the Hong Kong cycling national team at the 1987 Asian Cycling Championships and the 1988 Summer Olympics and was the team mechanic at the 1996 Summer Olympics. By 2000, he was an official for the Hong Kong Cycling Association.

== Career ==
At a Hongkong Amateur Cycling Association event held in 1971, Tang competed on behalf of Team Vitasoy. He received first place with a time of 27.20 seconds, 10 seconds ahead of the second-place finisher. Tang competed at the 1971 Asian Cycling Championships in Singapore. He qualified for four events: the 100 kilometres team time trial, the 200 kilometres massed start, the 1600 metres massed start, and the Tour of Singapore. At the 1971 Hong Kong Festival (Chinese: 香港節), he placed first out of 40 cyclists in a 10-mile race. He competed at the 1973 Asian Cycling Championships in Japan and the 1974 UCI Road World Championships in Montreal.

Tang was among 12 cyclists chosen by the Hongkong Cycling Association to train and compete for four spots at the 1974 Asian Games. He competed in three events at the 1976 Summer Olympics: men's individual road race (where he did not finish), men's individual pursuit (where he placed 24th), and men's team time trial (where his team placed 26th). 110 cyclists participated in the selection trials for the 1979 Pabst Challenge. Tang placed third with a time of 4 hours, 11 minutes, and 33 seconds in the 16.5 mile race. During the trials for the 1979 Asian Cycling Championships, Tang and two other cyclists set Hong Kong records.

In 1987, Tang coached the cyclist Leung Hung Tak. He was the coach for the Hong Kong cycling national team at the 1987 Asian Cycling Championships and the 1988 Summer Olympics. He coached five cyclists at the 1988 Olympics. During the 1996 Summer Olympics, Tang was the Hong Kong cycling team's mechanic. He was an official at the Hong Kong Cycling Association in 2000. In his role at the association, Tang negotiated on behalf of the cyclist Wong Kam-po with the Italian cycling team Selle Italia–Pacific, which had offered Wong a job.
