= Rainer Müller =

German cyclist

Personal information
- Born: 30 July 1946 (age 80) Berlin, Germany

Cycling career
- Sport: Cycling

Rainer Müller (born 30 July 1946) is a former German cyclist. He competed for West Germany in the tandem event at the 1972 Summer Olympics.
