= Gérard Quintyn =

French cyclist

Personal information
- Born: 2 January 1947 (age 79) Choisy-le-Roi, France

Cycling career
- Sport: Cycling

Gérard Quintyn (born 2 January 1947) is a French former cyclist. He competed in the sprint event at the 1972 Summer Olympics.
