= Vladimír Popelka =

Czech cyclist

Personal information
- Born: 14 October 1948 (age 78) Litomyšl, Czechoslovakia

Cycling career
- Sport: Cycling

Vladimír Popelka (born 14 October 1948) is a Czech former cyclist. He competed in the tandem event at the 1972 Summer Olympics.
