= Roddy Lee =

Taiwanese athlete

Personal information
- Native name: 李 忠平; Pinyin: Lǐ Zhōng-píng; Lee Chung-ping
- Full name: Roderick Lee
- Nationality: Taiwanese / American
- Born: 19 October 1949 (age 76)

Sport
- Sport: Sprinting
- Event: 4 × 100 metres relay
Medal record
Men's athletics
Representing Republic of China
Asian Games
Silver medal – second place	1970 Bangkok	110 m hurdles
Silver medal – second place	1970 Bangkok	400 m hurdles

Roderick "Roddy" Lee (born 19 October 1949), also known as Lee Chung-ping, is an American school teacher who represented the Republic of China (Taiwan) at the 1972 Munich Olympics.

Lee began running track while a student at El Cerrito High School in El Cerrito, California. As a high school athlete, "I liked the hurdles best," he has said. "It was a little more exciting and the races were a little faster."

Following graduation, Lee attended UC Berkeley where he was a business major and member of the track team. While running for the university, he was approached by a Chinese official to run in the 1970 Asian Games. Lee had dual Chinese (Republic of China)/American citizenship at the time and accepted the offer. He won two silver medals at the games. He also ran for China in the 1972 Olympics.

During his senior year of college, Lee decided to become a track coach. He earned his teaching credentials then coached track at Kennedy High School for ten years, after which he moved to his alma mater, ECHS, where he coached track and golf, taught computer science and P.E., and led its IT team.
