= Ed McRae =

Canadian cyclist (born 1953)

Personal information
- Born: 13 April 1953 (age 73) Kamloops, British Columbia, Canada

Cycling career
- Sport: Cycling

Ed McRae (born 13 April 1953) is a Canadian former cyclist. He competed in the sprint and team pursuit events at the 1972 Summer Olympics.
