= Winston Attong =

Trinidad cyclist (born 1947)

Personal information
- Born: 19 March 1947 (age 79)

Cycling career
- Sport: Cycling

Winston Attong (born 19 March 1947) is a former Trinidad cyclist. He competed in the sprint event at the 1972 Summer Olympics.
