= Saad Fadzil =

Malaysian cyclist (born 1948)

Personal information
- Born: 8 December 1948 (age 77)
- Height: 163 cm (5 ft 4 in)
- Weight: 64 kg (141 lb)

Cycling career
- Sport: Cycling
- Disciplines: road cycling and track cycling
- Role: Rider
Medal record
Representing Malaysia
Men's road bicycle racing
Southeast Asian Games
Gold medal – first place	1973 Singapore	4000m team pursuit
Silver medal – second place	1973 Singapore	1600m team time trial
Men's road bicycle racing
Southeast Asian Games
Silver medal – second place	1973 Singapore	100 km road team trial

Saad Fadzil (born 8 December 1948) is a Malaysian former track and road cyclist.

He won the gold medal at the 1973 SEAP Games in Singapore at the track in the 4000m team pursuit and the silver medal in the 1600m team time trial and on the road another silver medal in the 100 km team time trial.

He competed in the individual road race and team time trial events at the 1972 Summer Olympics.
