= Víctor Limba =

Argentine cyclist (1947–2026)

Personal information
- Full name: Víctor Juan Limba
- Born: 6 October 1947 Vicente López, Buenos Aires, Argentina
- Died: 12 August 2026 (aged 78) Buenos Aires, Argentina

Cycling career
- Sport: Cycling

Víctor Juan Limba (6 October 1947 – 12 August 2026) was an Argentine cyclist. He competed in the sprint event at the 1972 Summer Olympics. Limba died in Buenos Aires on 12 August 2026, at the age of 78.
