= Jeffrey Spencer =

American cyclist

Personal information
- Born: April 14, 1951 (age 75) Los Angeles, California, United States

Cycling career
- Sport: Cycling

Jeffrey Spencer (born April 14, 1951) is a former American cyclist. He competed in the sprint and tandem events at the 1972 Summer Olympics.
