= Arturo Cambroni =

Mexican cyclist

Personal information
- Born: 3 January 1953 (age 73) Michoacán, Mexico

Cycling career
- Sport: Cycling

Arturo Cambroni (born 3 January 1953) is a Mexican cyclist. He competed in the sprint and 1000m time trial events at the 1972 Summer Olympics.
