= Carlos Reybaud =

Argentine cyclist

Personal information
- Born: 31 October 1949 (age 76)

Cycling career
- Sport: Cycling
- Discipline: Track
- Rider type: Sprinter

Carlos Reybaud (born 31 October 1949) is a former Argentine cyclist. He competed in the sprint event at the 1972 Summer Olympics.
