= Suriya Chiarasapawong =

Thai cyclist

Personal information
- Born: 7 August 1949 (age 77)

Cycling career
- Sport: Cycling

Suriya Chiarasapawong (born 7 August 1949) is a former Thai cyclist. He competed in the sprint and 1000 time trial events at the 1972 Summer Olympics.
