= Cycling at the 1973 SEAP Games =

Historical Cycling

The Cycling at the 1973 SEAP Games were held at the Farrer Park and Sembawang, Singapore. Cycling events was held between 2 September to 8 September.

== Medal summary ==
=== Men ===
Event	Gold		Silver		Bronze	
1000 m Individual trial	(Thailand) Anantachai Suthisil	1:19.08	(Singapore) Mohd Tahar Hairi	1:19.13	(Malaysia) Daud Ibrahim	1:19.71
1600 m Team trial	Thailand Anantachai Suthisil; Taworn Tarwan; Cherdcho Sukkato; Samyose Karnjananiran	2:06.26	Malaysia Azizan Ramli; Daud Ibrahim; Ramli Hashim; Saad Fadzil	2:08.15	Singapore Mohd. Tahar; Jamil Mohammad; Tan Choon Koon; Loh Keng Wah	2:08.19
100 km Team trial	Thailand Pinit Kaykorpkaew; Chartcai Chantarat; Khawkiet Chlengchin; Pramote Sangakulrote	2:38:48.09	Malaysia Saad Fadzil; Alias Kamal; A.A. Rahman; Raja Othman	2:42:04.57	Khmer Republic Yi Yuong; Danh Tham Se; Lim Sophal; Mam Sean	2:46:10.67
800 m Individual massed	(South Vietnam) Trương Kim Hùng	1:02.56	(Malaysia) Ramli Hashim	1:02.68	(Singapore) Mohd Tahar Hairi	1:02.91
1600 m Individual massed	(Thailand) Anantachai Suthisil	2:11.22	(Malaysia) Daud Ibrahim	2:11.51	(South Vietnam) Truong Kim Hung	2:11.91
4800 m Individual massed	(Thailand) Cherdcho Sukkato	9:09.40	(Malaysia) Ramli Hashim	9:09.59	(Singapore) Jamil Muhammad Mutalib	9:09.92
10,000 m Individual massed	(Malaysia) Daud Ibrahim	18:06.06	(Thailand) Samyose Karnjananiran	18:6.20	(Singapore) Tan Choon Koon	18:06.33
4000 m Individual pursuit	(Malaysia) Mohd Fadzli Ibrahim	5:45.48	(Thailand) Cherdcho Sukkato	5:46.60	(Singapore) Abdul Abbas Mutalib	5:48.46
4000 m Team pursuit	Malaysia Rahim Baharuddin; Saad Fadzil; Azizan Ramli; Kamaruddin Ali	5:31.38	Thailand Cherdcho Sukkato; Samyose Karnjananiran; Taworn Tawan; Anantachai Suthisil	5:38.12	Singapore Abdul Abbas Mutalib; Tan Choon Koon; Mohd Tahir; Jamil Mohammad	4:20.39
170 km Road race	(Malaysia) Raja Othman	4:57:19.78	(Malaysia) Alias Kamal	4:57:20.14	(Thailand) Khawkiet Chiengchin	4:57:20.21
170 km Road Race Team	Malaysia Raja Othman; Alias Kamal; Sobari Yusof	14:55:18.65	Thailand Khawkiet Chiengchin; Senam Loymake; Pramote Sangakulrote	15:05:54.30	Singapore Lee Choon Kiat; Toh Tin Khoon; Tan Kheok Hung	15:09:54.91

== Medal table ==
Rank	Nation	Gold	Silver	Bronze	Total
1	Malaysia (MAS)	5	6	1	12
2	Thailand (THA)	5	4	1	10
3	South Vietnam (VNM)	1	0	1	2
4	Singapore (SIN)	0	1	7	8
5	Cambodia (KHM)	0	0	1	1
Totals (5 entries)		11	11	11	33
