= Jürgen Schütze =

East German cyclist

Personal information
- Born: 3 March 1951 Arnsdorf, East Germany
- Died: 6 September 2000 (aged 49) Leipzig, Germany

Cycling career
- Sport: Cycling
Medal record
Men's cycling
Representing East Germany
Olympic Games
Bronze medal – third place	1972 Munich	1000m time trial

Jürgen Schütze (3 March 1951 – 6 September 2000) was an East German racing cyclist, who won the bronze medal at the 1972 Summer Olympics. He competed for the SC Dynamo Berlin / Sportvereinigung (SV) Dynamo.
