= Neville Hunte =

Guyanese cyclist

Personal information
- Born: 5 August 1948 (age 78)

Cycling career
- Sport: Cycling

Neville Hunte (born 5 August 1948) is a former Guyanese cyclist. He competed in the sprint and 1000m time trial events at the 1972 Summer Olympics.

He is also president of the Guyana Cycling Association of North America, which raises money to provide equipment and training to underserved Guyanese cyclists.

Hunte's brother Cyril is also a competitive cyclist.
