= Gustaaf Hermans =

Belgian cyclist

Personal information
- Born: 12 May 1951 (age 75) Wezemaal, Belgium

Cycling career
- Sport: Cycling

Gustaaf Hermans (born 12 May 1951) is a former Belgian cyclist. He competed in the individual road race and team time trial events at the 1972 Summer Olympics.
