= Félix Suárez (cyclist) =

Spanish cyclist (1950–2020)

Félix Suárez colomo
Personal information
- Born: 6 December 1950 Cistérniga, Spain
- Died: 3 September 2020 (aged 69)

Cycling career
- Sport: Cycling

Félix Suárez (6 December 1950 – 3 September 2020) was a Spanish racing cyclist. He competed in the sprint event at the 1972 Summer Olympics.
