= Robert Maveau =

Belgian cyclist

Personal information
- Nickname: De Kabouter
- Born: 14 September 1944 Antwerp, Belgium
- Died: 25 November 1978 (aged 34) Antwerp, Belgium
- Height: 167 cm (5 ft 6 in)
- Weight: 64 kg (141 lb)

Cycling career
- Sport: Cycling

Professional team
- Stuivenberg WC

Robert Maveau (14 September 1944 – 25 November 1978) was a Belgian cyclist. He competed in the men's sprint and the 1000m time trial events at the 1972 Summer Olympics.
