= Ralph Therrio =

American cyclist

Personal information
- Born: January 12, 1954 (age 72) Mobile, Alabama, United States
- Died: January 13, 2021 Lakewood, California

Cycling career
- Sport: Cycling

Ralph Therrio (born January 12, 1954) is an American former cyclist. He competed at the 1972 Summer Olympics and 1976 Summer Olympics.
