= Fernando Cruz (cyclist) =

Colombian cyclist (born 1953)

Personal information
- Born: 15 February 1953 (age 73)

Cycling career
- Sport: Cycling

Fernando Cruz (born 15 February 1953) is a former Colombian cyclist. He competed in the individual road race and team time trial events at the 1972 Summer Olympics.
