= Carlos Galeano =

Colombian cyclist

Personal information
- Born: 13 August 1950 (age 76)

Cycling career
- Sport: Cycling

Carlos Galeano (born 13 August 1950) is a former Colombian cyclist. He competed in the sprint event at the 1972 Summer Olympics.
