= Vicente Revellón =

Colombian footballer (born 1950)

Personal information
- Date of birth: 4 June 1950 (age 76)
- Position: Defender

Senior career*
Years	Team	Apps	(Gls)
- Independiente Santa Fe
- * Club domestic league appearances and goals

Vicente Revellón (born 4 June 1950) is a Colombian former footballer who competed in the 1972 Summer Olympics.
