= Peder Pedersen (cyclist) =

Danish cyclist and policeman

Personal information
- Born: 3 November 1945 Nørre Nærå, Syddanmark, Denmark
- Died: 9 January 2015 (aged 69) Odense, Denmark
- Height: 190 cm (6 ft 3 in)
- Weight: 87 kg (192 lb)

Cycling career
- Sport: Cycling
- Discipline: Sprinter
- Rider type: Track

Amateur team
- 1964–1974: Odense Cykelbane Klub, Dansk Bicycle Club, Gentofte
Medal record
Representing DEN
Olympic Games
| Gold medal – first place | 1968 Mexico City | Team pursuit |
UCI Track Cycling World Championships
| Bronze medal – third place | 1969 Brno | Sprint, amateur |
| Silver medal – second place | 1970 Leicester | Sprint, amateur |
| Bronze medal – third place | 1971 Varese | 1 km time trial, amateur |
| Gold medal – first place | 1974 Montreal | Sprint, professional |
| Silver medal – second place | 1975 Rocourt | Sprint, professional |

Peder Pedersen (3 November 1945 – 9 January 2015) was a Danish track cyclist who won a gold medal in the team pursuit at the 1968 Olympics. He also competed in the sprint at the 1964, 1968 and 1972 Summer Olympics, but failed to reach the final. He was selected at the Olympic flag bearer for Denmark in 1972.

Pedersen won two medals in the sprint at the amateur world championships in 1969–70. After the 1972 Olympics he turned professional and won the 1974 world sprint title, finishing second in 1975. Domestically he held 11 Danish titles, mostly in the sprint. After retiring from competitions he coached the national cycling team in 1977–92. He was also a board member of the Danish Cycling Union in 1977–90 and served as its president in 1991–2005. From 1993 to 1997 he was a board member of the Union Cycliste Internationale. Pedersen was a policeman by profession, and at some point in his life headed the traffic police in Fünen.
