= Eric Stoupel =

Belgian field hockey player

Personal information
- Nationality: Belgian
- Born: 9 September 1948 (age 77) Etterbeek, Belgium

Sport
- Sport: Field hockey

Eric Stoupel (born 9 September 1948) is a Belgian field hockey player. He competed in the men's tournament at the 1972 Summer Olympics.
