= Isaac Guetta =

Talmudic scholar (1777–1857)

- Born: June 5, 1777; Tripoli, Ottoman Tripolitania
- Died: February 2, 1857 (aged 79); Safed, Ottoman Syria
- Resting place: Safed Old Jewish Cemetery

Isaac Guetta (Hebrew: יצחק גויטע; June 5, 1777 – February 2, 1857) was a Talmudic scholar and educationalist.

== Biography ==
Isaac Guetta was born in Tripoli, Libya, into a family tracing back to Jews who arrived in the Near East from Huete, Spain. He spent a significant portion of his life in Triest. In his later years, Guetta relocated to the Holy Land, where in Tiberias and Safed he played a pivotal role in establishing Talmudic seminaries.

Guetta authored four volumes of novellæ to the Babylonian Talmud, published in Leghorn (1846–47) and in Vienna (1851–56) under the title Sedeh Yiẓḥaḳ.

His grandson was the Hebrew poet David Ara, author of the collection Ḳol Dawid (Venice, 1880).
