= Orlando Rivas =

Colombian footballer (born 1950)

Personal information
- Date of birth: 17 July 1950 (age 76)
- Position: Defender

Senior career*
| Years | Team | Apps | (Gls) |
- Unión Magdalena
- * Club domestic league appearances and goals

Orlando Rivas (born 17 July 1950) is a Colombian former footballer who competed in the 1972 Summer Olympics.
