= Maurice Hugh-Sam =

Jamaican cyclist

Personal information
- Born: 17 February 1955 (age 71)

Cycling career
- Sport: Cycling

Maurice Hugh-Sam (born 17 February 1955) is a Jamaican former cyclist. He competed in the sprint and team pursuit events at the 1972 Summer Olympics.
