= Benedykt Kocot =

Polish cyclist (born 1954)

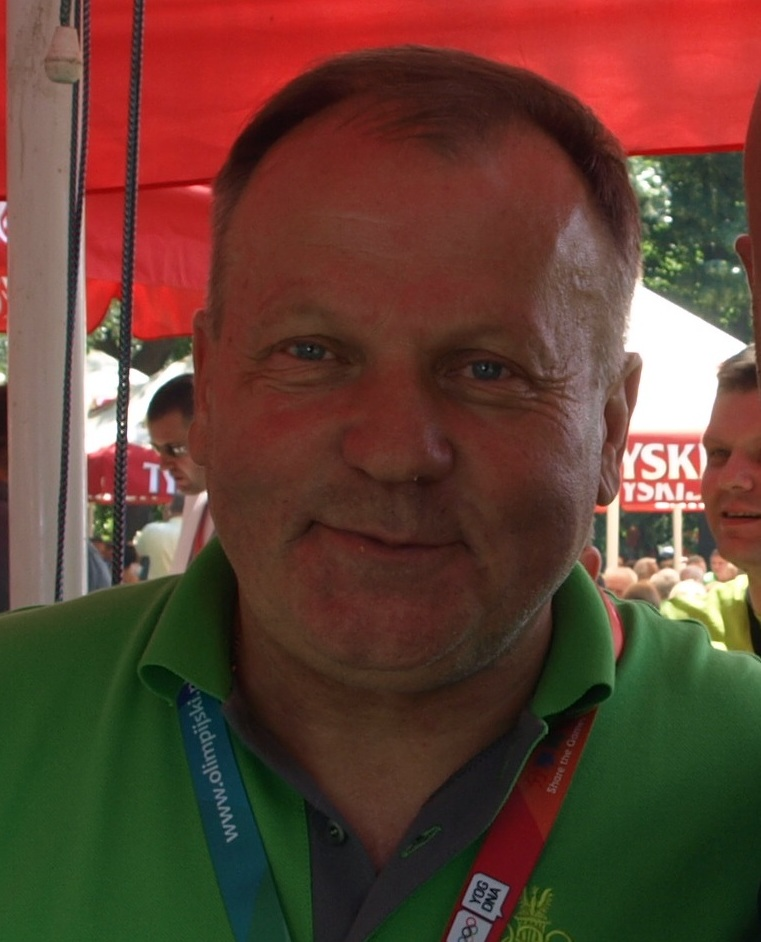
- Kocot in 2014

Personal information
- Born: 11 April 1954 (age 72) Chrząstowice, Poland
- Height: 173 cm (5 ft 8 in)
- Weight: 74 kg (163 lb)

Cycling career
- Sport: Cycling
Medal record
Men's track cycling
Representing Poland
Olympic Games
Bronze medal – third place	1972 Munich	2000 m Tandem

Benedykt Kocot (born 11 April 1954) is a Polish cyclist. He won the Olympic bronze medal in the Tandem at the 1972 Summer Olympics in Munich along with Andrzej Bek.

== Career ==
He won a bronze medal at the 1972 Olympic Games in Munich in tandem cycling (with Andrzej Bek). He also won a bronze medal at the 1974 World Championships in Montreal in tandem cycling (with Bek) and a gold medal at the 1975 World Championships in Liège in the same event (with Janusz Kotliński). He was a five-time Polish sprint champion (1972, 1976, 1977, 1979, 1980), a three-time runner-up in the sprint (1975) and the 1 km standing start (1972, 1976), and a two-time bronze medalist at the Polish Championships: in the sprint (1978) and the 1 km standing start (1974).

In 1972, he was awarded the Gold Cross of Merit.
