= Massimo Marino (cyclist) =

Italian cyclist

Personal information
- Born: 4 June 1954 (age 72) Rome, Italy
- Height: 5 ft 10 in (178 cm)
- Weight: 72 kg (159 lb)

Cycling career
- Sport: Cycling

Massimo Marino (born 4 June 1954) is an Italian former cyclist. He competed at the 1972 and 1976 Summer Olympics.
