= Chen Ming-chi (triple jumper) =

Taiwanese sprinter

Personal information
- Nationality: Taiwanese
- Born: 6 August 1947 (age 78)

Sport
- Sport: Sprinting
- Event: 4 × 100 metres relay

Chen Ming-chi (Chinese: 陳明智; pinyin: Chén Míngzhì; also spelled Cheng Ming-Chih; born 6 August 1947) is a Taiwanese Olympic triple jumper, long jumper, and sprinter.

Chen finished 31st in the rounds of the long and triple jump at the 1968 Summer Olympics.

At the 1972 Summer Olympics, Chen also finished 31st in triple jump qualification. He also competed in the men's 4 × 100 metres relay at the 1972 Summer Olympics. His team (in Heat 2) placed 7 out of 8.

On 27 October 1974, Chen set a triple jump personal best of 16.03 metres to win a meet in Kaohsiung. He improved his best to 16.35 m to win a meet in Taichung on 23 July 1977.
