= Rafael Narváez =

Colombian cyclist

Personal information
- Born: 17 July 1950 (age 76)

Cycling career
- Sport: Cycling

Rafael Narváez (born 17 July 1950) is a former Colombian cyclist. He competed in the tandem event at the 1972 Summer Olympics.
