= Ezio Cardi =

Italian cyclist (born 1948)

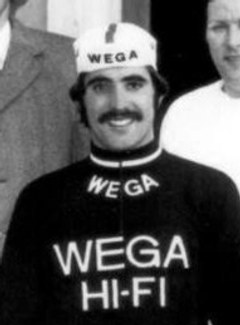
- Cardi in 1974–75

Personal information
- Born: 24 October 1948 (age 77) Bardolino, Italy

Cycling career
- Sport: Cycling
Medal record
Representing Italy
World Championships
Bronze medal – third place	1973 San Sebastián	Sprint

Ezio Cardi (born 24 October 1948) is an Italian retired track cyclist. As an amateur he competed in the sprint and 1000 m time trial events at the 1972 Summer Olympics, placing ninth in the time trial. In 1973 he turned professional and won a bronze medal in the sprint at the 1973 UCI Track Cycling World Championships.
