= Michel Deville (field hockey) =

Belgian hockey player

Personal information
- Nationality: Belgian
- Born: 17 July 1946 (age 80) Antwerp, Belgium

Sport
- Sport: Field hockey

Michel Deville (born 17 July 1946) is a Belgian field hockey player. He competed at the 1968 Summer Olympics and the 1972 Summer Olympics.
