= Yaichi Numata =

Japanese cyclist

Personal information
- Born: 29 June 1951 (age 75) Fukushima, Japan

Cycling career
- Sport: Cycling

Yaichi Numata (沼田 弥一, Numata Yaichi; born 29 June 1951) is a former Japanese cyclist. He competed in the sprint and tandem events at the 1972 Summer Olympics.
