= Honson Chin =

Jamaican cyclist

Personal information
- Born: 12 January 1956 (age 70)

Cycling career
- Sport: Cycling

Honson Chin (born 12 January 1956) is a former Jamaican cyclist. He competed in the sprint and tandem events at the 1972 Summer Olympics.
