= Omar Pkhakadze =

Georgian sprint cyclist

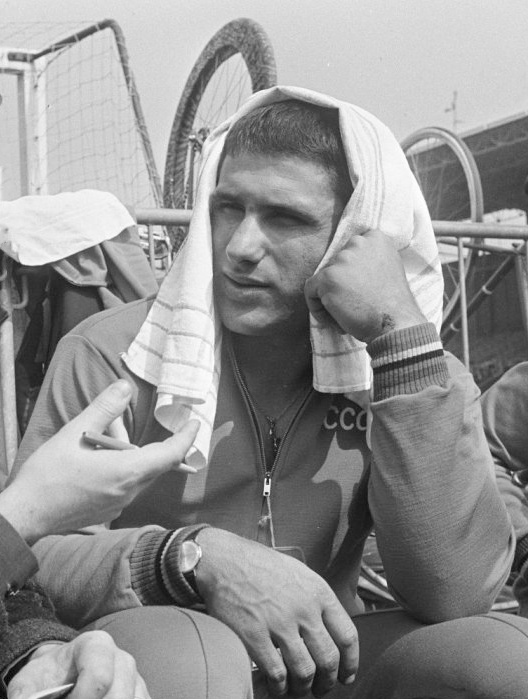
- Omar Pkhakadze in 1967

Personal information
- Born: 12 August 1944 Kutaisi, Georgian SSR, Soviet Union
- Died: 21 May 1993 (aged 48) Tbilisi, Georgia
- Height: 1.87 m (6 ft 2 in)
- Weight: 95 kg (209 lb)

Sport
- Sport: Cycling
- Club: Dynamo Tbilisi
Medal record
Representing Soviet Union
Olympic Games
Bronze medal – third place	1972 Munich	Individual sprint

Omar Pkhakadze (Georgian: ომარ ფხაკაძე, Russian: Омар Пхакадзе; 12 August 1944 – 21 May 1993) was a Georgian sprint cyclist. He competed for the Soviet Union at the 1964, 1968, and 1972 Olympics and finished in fourth and third place in 1968 and 1972, respectively, winning the first Soviet Olympic medal in sprint cycling. In 1965 he also became the first Soviet sprinter to win a world title; he finished third in 1966 and second in 1969. During his career he won 10 national titles – in 1963, 1964 and 1966–1973.

He was born in a poor family; his father was handicapped in war and died when Phakadze was 15, leaving his wife with four children. The same year, Phakadze started training in cycling. He retired after the 1972 Olympics and worked as a cycling coach, training the Soviet team between 1978 and 1984 and becoming the first president of the Georgian Cycling Federation. He married Donara Dzhanukashvili (Russian: Донара Джанукашвили), a former competitive gymnast.

In 1987 he and Georgian Olympic wrestler Levan Tediashvili played two heroes in the historical Georgian film Khareba da Gogia. The film director Georgiy Shengelaya chose them instead of professional actors for their athleticism, charisma and energy required for these roles; their assistants in the film were also played by sportsmen, world champions in wrestling.
