= Chris Binet =

Belgian sports shooter

Personal information
- Born: 28 May 1937 (age 89) Berchem-Sainte-Agathe, Belgium

Sport
- Sport: Sports shooting

Chris Binet (born 28 May 1937) is a Belgian former sports shooter. He competed at the 1972 Summer Olympics and the 1976 Summer Olympics.
