= Tselovalnik =

Official in Russian Tsardom

Tselovalnik (Russian: целовальник, literally, "kisser", actually "sworn man"), was a common term for various officials in the Tsardom of Russia elected by zemshchina (the population, as opposed to the tsardom's state apparatus) in uyezds and posads in various judicial, financial and police functions. The term is a contraction of the expression krestny tselovalnik, "the one who kissed the cross", in reference to the sworn oath accompanied with the kissing of the Holy Cross.

The history of this institution has two periods: before and after the Time of Troubles (early 17th century). During the former period tselovalniks acted independently, and afterwards they served under the voivodes and the officials of various prikazes.

The term was first mentioned in the Sudebnik of 1497 and later in the statutory charters of Novgorod of Vasili III of Russia.

By 1508 the chronicler says that to avoid miscarriage of justice in courts, Grand Prince ordered tiuns to sit on court with a tselovaltiks, 4 per month. In the first half of the XVI century, before tsar Ivan Grozny coming to age, cities and uyezds get almost everywhere to elect their favorite people, including tselovalniks, for civil and criminal affairs (gubnoy tselovaalnik), and since 1555 in many places zemstvo self-government was introduced; The scope of the authorities of tselovalniks expand and they receive material support from their constituents. At that time tselovalniks act independently and help other officials in apprehending thieves, robbers, collection of taxes, customs and trade duties and trade, etc.

After the Time of Troubles, the second period begins. Tselovalniks become office-holders, but without the corresponding rights. Government seeks all of its numerous management functions for various fee collections and trading operations, to pass onto elected starostas and tselovalniks. Uyezd tselovalniks were limited in their activities compared to the city ones.

== Kabak tselovalnik ==
When tsar Ivan IV introduced kabaks (taverns under state monopoly for hard liquors), they were controlled by sworn persons, i.e., tselovalniks. These were the kabak head and his helperes, who actually sold the liquors. Over time the term "tselovalnik" stuck for tavern keepers and went out of use for other meanings.
