= Alfonso Rodríguez (sport shooter) =

Colombian sports shooter

Personal information
- Born: 30 May 1929

Sport
- Sport: Sports shooting

Alfonso Rodríguez (born 30 May 1929) is a Colombian former sports shooter. He competed in two events at the 1972 Summer Olympics.
