= Jairo Rodríguez =

Colombian cyclist

Personal information
- Born: 18 October 1949
- Died: 2 March 2010 (aged 60)

Cycling career
- Sport: Cycling

Jairo Rodríguez (18 October 1949 – 2 March 2010) was a Colombian cyclist. He competed in the 1000m time trial event at the 1972 Summer Olympics.
