= Fabio Acevedo =

Colombian cyclist

Personal information
- Born: 9 December 1949 (age 76)

Cycling career
- Sport: Cycling

Fabio Acevedo (born 9 December 1949) is a Colombian cyclist. He competed in the individual road race and team time trial events at the 1972 Summer Olympics.
