= Andrzej Bek =

Polish cyclist

Personal information
- Born: 26 June 1951 (age 75) Łódź, Poland

Cycling career
- Sport: Cycling
Medal record
Men's track cycling
Representing Poland
Olympic Games
Bronze medal – third place	1972 Munich	2000 m Tandem

Andrzej Bek (born 26 June 1951) is a former Polish cyclist. He won the Olympic bronze medal in the Tandem in the 1972 Summer Olympics in Munich along with Benedykt Kocot.
