= Werner Otto (cyclist) =

East German cyclist (born 1948)

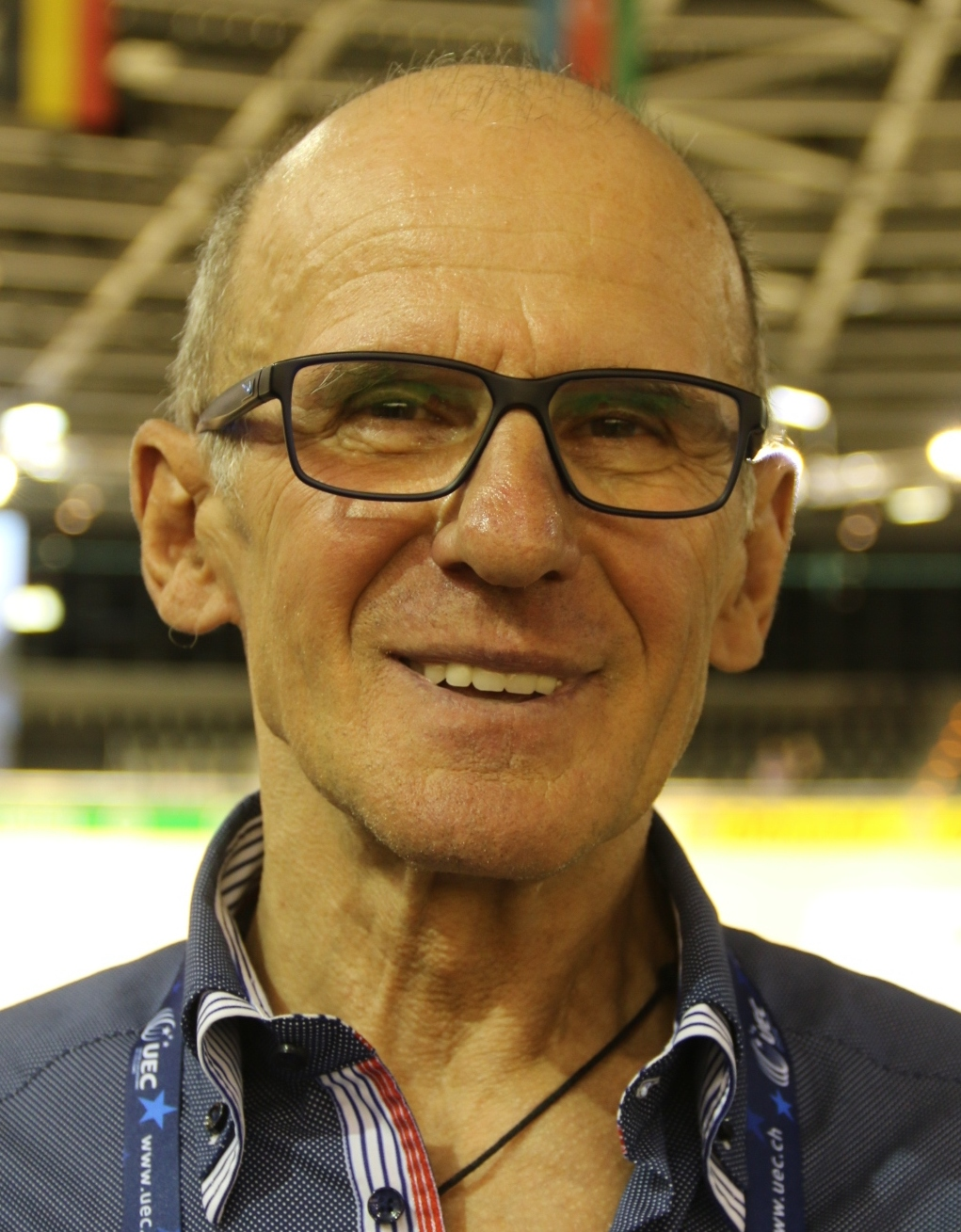
- Werner Otto in 2017

Personal information
- Born: 15 April 1948 (age 78) Dresden, Soviet occupation zone of Germany
- Height: 179 cm (5 ft 10 in)
- Weight: 83 kg (183 lb)

Cycling career
- Sport: Cycling

Amateur team
- 1968–1973: SC Dynamo Berlin
Medal record
Representing East Germany
Men's cycling
Olympic Games
Silver medal – second place	1972 Munich	2000 m tandem
World Championships
Gold medal – first place	1969 Brno	2000 m tandem
Silver medal – second place	1970 Leicester	2000 m tandem
Gold medal – first place	1971 Varese	2000 m tandem
Bronze medal – third place	1973 San Sebastián	2000 m tandem

Werner Otto (born 15 April 1948) is a retired track cyclist from East Germany. He competed in the 2000 m tandem at the 1968 and 1972 Olympics and won a silver medal in 1972, alongside Jürgen Geschke; they finished fifth in 1968. At the world championships Otto and Geschke won two gold, one silver and one bronze medal in 1969–1973.
