= Jean-André Zembsch =

Belgian hockey player (born 1949)

Personal information
- Nationality: Belgian
- Born: 17 December 1949 (age 76) Uccle, Belgium

Sport
- Sport: Field hockey

Jean-André Zembsch (born 17 December 1949) is a Belgian field hockey player. He competed in the men's tournament at the 1972 Summer Olympics.
