= Benjamin Evangelista =

Filipino cyclist (born 1949)

Personal information
- Born: March 29, 1949 (age 77) Quezon City, Philippines
- Height: 168 cm (5 ft 6 in)
- Weight: 58 kg (128 lb)

Cycling career
- Sport: Cycling

Benjamin Evangelista (born March 29, 1949) is a Filipino former cyclist. He competed in the individual pursuit at the 1968 Summer Olympics.
