= Behrouz Rahbar =

Iranian cyclist (1945–2019)

Personal information
- Born: 23 September 1945
- Died: 22 March 2019 (aged 73) Tabriz, Iran
- Height: 175 cm (5 ft 9 in)

Cycling career
- Sport: Cycling

Behrouz Rahbar (Persian: بهروز رهبر, 23 September 1945 – 22 March 2019) was an Iranian cyclist. He competed in three events at the 1972 Summer Olympics according to sports-reference.org and according to the-sports.org he rode in addition the men's sprint event. He also won a bronze medal in the 1974 Asian Games in Tehran.
