= Noël Soetaert =

Belgian cyclist

Personal information
- Born: 23 November 1949 (age 76) Westende, Belgium

Cycling career
- Sport: Cycling

Noël Soetaert (born 23 November 1949) is a former Belgian cyclist. He competed in the tandem event at the 1972 Summer Olympics.
