= Manu Snellinx =

Belgian cyclist

Personal information
- Born: 23 August 1948 Grote-Spouwen, Belgium
- Died: 29 May 2017 (aged 68)

Cycling career
- Sport: Cycling

Manu Snellinx (23 August 1948 – 29 May 2017) was a Belgian cyclist. He competed in the sprint and tandem events at the 1972 Summer Olympics.
