= Pinit Koeykorpkeo =

Thai cyclist

Personal information
- Born: 5 December 1951 (age 74)

Cycling career
- Sport: Cycling

Pinit Koeykorpkeo (born 5 December 1951) is a former Thai cyclist. He competed in the team time trial at the 1972 Summer Olympics.
