= Fernando Jiménez (cyclist) =

Argentine cyclist

Personal information
- Born: 14 March 1949 (age 77)

Cycling career
- Sport: Cycling

Fernando Jiménez (also Giménez) (born 14 March 1949) is a former Argentine cyclist. He competed in the 1000m time trial event at the 1972 Summer Olympics.
