= Roger Young (cyclist) =

American cyclist

Personal information
- Born: May 21, 1953 (age 73) Pontiac, Michigan, United States
- Height: 1.73 m (5 ft 8 in)
- Weight: 100 kg (220 lb)

Sport
- Sport: Cycling
- Club: Michigan State Spartans, East Lansing
Medal record
Representing the United States
Pan American Games
Gold medal – first place	1975 Mexico City	Team pursuit

Roger Jay Young (born May 21, 1953) is a retired American cyclist. He was part of the United States team that won a gold medal in the 4000 m pursuit at the 1975 Pan American Games. He competed at the 1972 & 1976 Summer Olympics in the sprint '72 and Team Pursuit '76, but failed to reach the final. In 1973 he won the national title in track sprint.

After retirement from competitions he works as a cycling coach. He's married to movie producer Elaine Dysinger. Roger's sister Sheila Young, was a world World Champion in speed skating and cycling.
