= Marc Legros =

Belgian field hockey player

Personal information
- Nationality: Belgian
- Born: 2 July 1946 (age 79) Uccle, Belgium

Sport
- Sport: Field hockey

Marc Legros (born 2 July 1946) is a Belgian former field hockey player. He competed at the 1968 Summer Olympics and the 1972 Summer Olympics.
