= Jairo Díaz (cyclist) =

Colombian cyclist (born 1945)

Personal information
- Born: 7 February 1945 (age 81)

Cycling career
- Sport: Cycling

Jairo Díaz (born 7 February 1945) is a former Colombian cyclist. He competed in the sprint and tandem events at the 1972 Summer Olympics.
