= Chen Hsiu-hsiung =

Taiwanese sailor

Personal information
- Nationality: Taiwanese
- Born: 17 November 1935 (age 89)

Sport
- Sport: Sailing

Chen Hsiu-hsiung (born 17 November 1935) is a Taiwanese sailor. He competed at the 1968 Summer Olympics and the 1972 Summer Olympics.
