= Michael Lecky =

Jamaican cyclist

Personal information
- Born: 12 November 1952 (age 73)

Cycling career
- Sport: Cycling

Michael Lecky (born 12 November 1952) is a Jamaican former cyclist. He competed in three events at the 1972 Summer Olympics. He currently resides in Canada and operates a managing general agency, Alliance Financial Group, founded in 1982.
