= Raoul Ronsmans =

Belgian hockey player

Personal information
- Nationality: Belgian
- Born: 12 January 1950 (age 76)

Sport
- Sport: Field hockey

Raoul Ronsmans (born 12 January 1950) is a Belgian field hockey player. He competed in the men's tournament at the 1972 Summer Olympics.
