= Chen Kue-sen =

Taiwanese weightlifter

Personal information
- Native name: 陳桂森
- Nationality: Taiwanese
- Born: 30 June 1947 (age 77)

Sport
- Sport: Weightlifting

Chen Kue-sen (traditional Chinese: 陳桂森; simplified Chinese: 陈桂森; born 30 June 1947) is a Taiwanese weightlifter. He competed at the 1968 Summer Olympics and the 1972 Summer Olympics.

== Biography ==
Chen is from Yanping Township. He competed in the 1966 Asian Games, the 1968 Summer Olympics, and the 1970 Asian Games. He did high-altitude training at the mountain Hehuanshan in 1968. During the Olympics qualification round on 14 August 1968, he lifted a total of 330 kilograms (730 lb), which set a national record. By 1970, he was the holder of three national records: as a flyweight, he did a single lift of 88.4 kilograms (195 lb); as a bantamweight, he did a single lift of 110 kilograms (240 lb); as a bantamweight, he had a total lift of 330 kilograms (730 lb). Chen qualified for the 1971 Asian Weightlifting Championships. He served as referee at the championship match of the men's Group A competition of the 1993 World Weightlifting Championships. Huang served as a member of the Asian Weightlifting Federation's Statistics Committee (Chinese: 統計委員會) in 1994.
