= Dumas Guette =

Colombian footballer (born 1952)

Personal information
- Date of birth: 25 December 1952 (age 73)
- Position: Defender

Senior career*
Years	Team	Apps	(Gls)
- Deportivo Cali
- * Club domestic league appearances and goals

Dumas Guette (born 25 December 1952) is a Colombian former footballer who competed in the 1972 Summer Olympics.
