= Karl Köther (cyclist, born 1942) =

German cyclist

Personal information
- Born: 1 January 1942 (age 84) Hanover, Germany

Cycling career
- Sport: Cycling

Karl Köther (born 1 January 1942) is a German former cyclist. He competed in the sprint and 1000m time trial events at the 1972 Summer Olympics. His father, also named Karl Köther, competed at the 1928 Summer Olympics.
