= Rafael Reyes (footballer) =

Colombian footballer (born 1951)

Personal information
- Full name: Santiago Rafael Reyes
- Date of birth: 17 July 1951 (age 75)
- Place of birth: Colombia
- Height: 1.70 m (5 ft 7 in)
- Position: Defender

Senior career*
Years	Team	Apps	(Gls)
- Deportes Tolima
- * Club domestic league appearances and goals

Rafael Reyes (born 17 July 1951) is a Colombian former footballer who competed in the 1972 Summer Olympics.
