= Lee Yue-hwan =

Taiwanese swimmer

Personal information
- Full name: 李 玉環, Pinyin: Lǐ Yù-huán
- Born: 12 August 1958 (age 67)

Sport
- Sport: Swimming

Lee Yue-hwan (born 12 August 1958) is a Taiwanese former breaststroke swimmer. She competed in two events at the 1972 Summer Olympics.
