= Niels Fredborg =

Danish cyclist (born 1946)

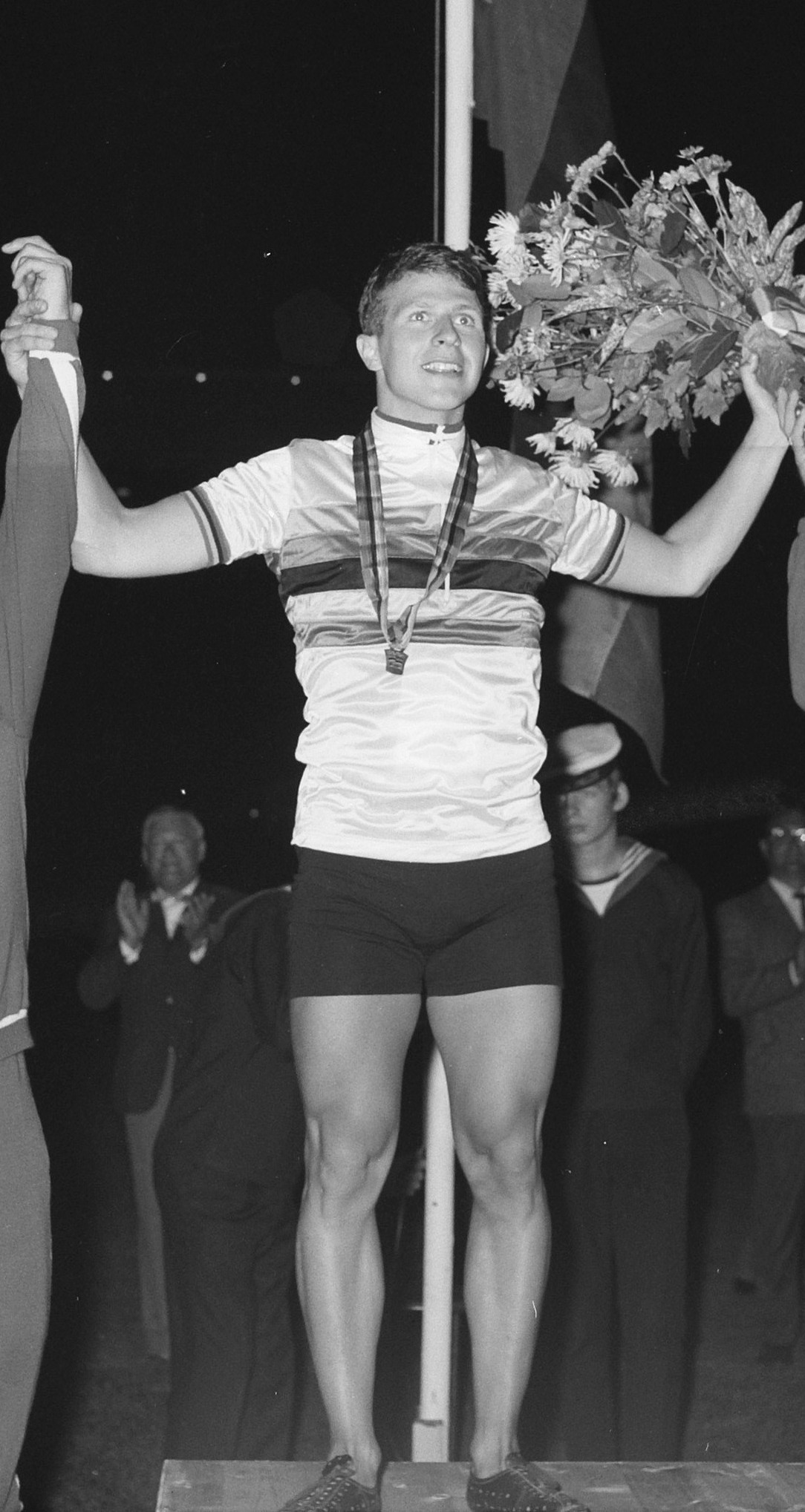
- Niels Fredborg in 1967

Personal information
- Born: 28 October 1946 (age 79) Odder, Denmark
- Height: 1.76 m (5 ft 9 in)
- Weight: 75 kg (165 lb)

Sport
- Sport: Cycling
- Club: Aarhus Bane – Klub, Århus
Medal record
Representing Denmark
Olympic Games
Gold medal – first place	1972 Munich	1 km time trial
Silver medal – second place	1968 Mexico City	1 km time trial
Bronze medal – third place	1976 Montreal	1 km time trial
World Track Championships
Gold medal – first place	1967 Amsterdam	1 km
Gold medal – first place	1968 Montevideo	1 km
Gold medal – first place	1970 Leicester	1 km
Silver medal – second place	1968 Montevideo	Sprint
Bronze medal – third place	1980 Besançon	Keirin

Niels Christian Fredborg (born 28 October 1946) is a Danish retired track cyclist. He competed at the 1964, 1968, 1972 and 1976 Summer Olympics in the sprint and 1 km time trial events, winning a silver, a gold and a bronze medal in the time trial in 1968, 1972 and 1976, respectively. In 1972 he was Denmark's only Olympic medalist.

At the Track Cycling World Championships, Fredborg won the 1 km time trial in 1967, 1968 and 1970. In 1969 he won the International Champion of Champions sprint at Herne Hill velodrome.
