= Karl Köther (cyclist, born 1905) =

German cyclist

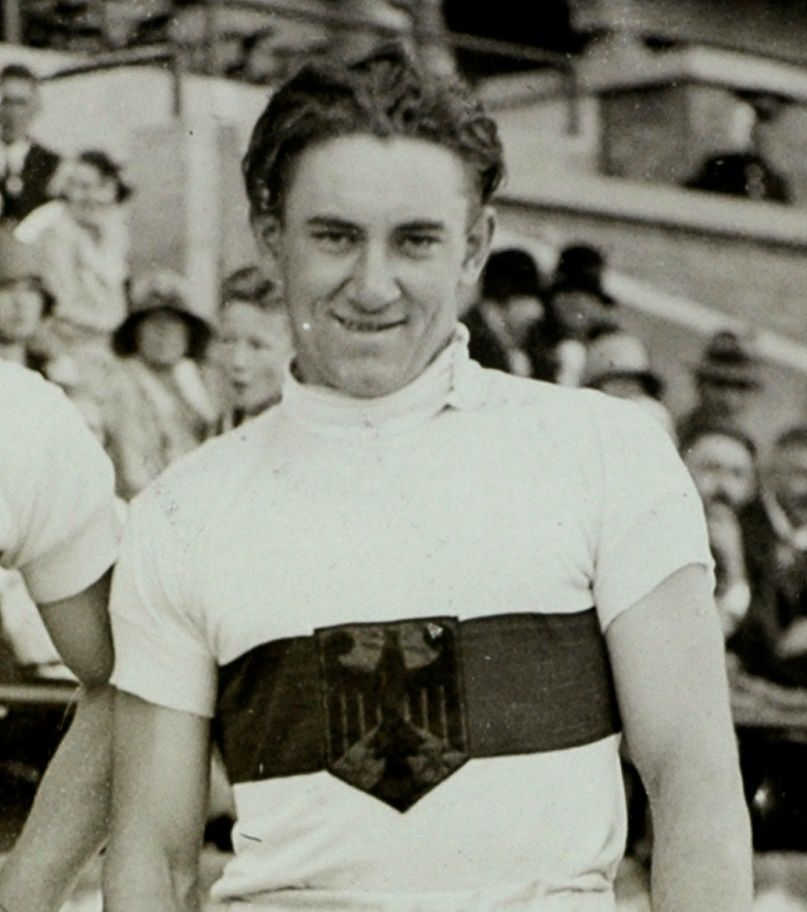
- Karl Köther in 1928

Personal information
- Born: 27 May 1905 Hannover, German Empire
- Died: 27 January 1986 (aged 80) Seelze, West Germany

Cycling career
- Sport: Cycling
Medal record
Representing GER
Men's cycling
Olympic Games
Bronze medal – third place	1928 Amsterdam	Tandem

Karl Köther (27 May 1905 – 27 January 1986) was a German cyclist. He won the bronze medal in Men's tandem in the 1928 Summer Olympics. His son, Karl, competed at the 1972 Summer Olympics.
