= Hector Edwards =

Barbadian cyclist (born 1949)

Personal information
- Born: 18 March 1949 (age 77)

Cycling career
- Sport: Cycling

Hector Edwards (born 18 March 1949) is a Barbadian former cyclist. He competed at the 1972 Summer Olympics and the 1976 Summer Olympics.
