= Jürgen Geschke =

East German cyclist (born 1943)

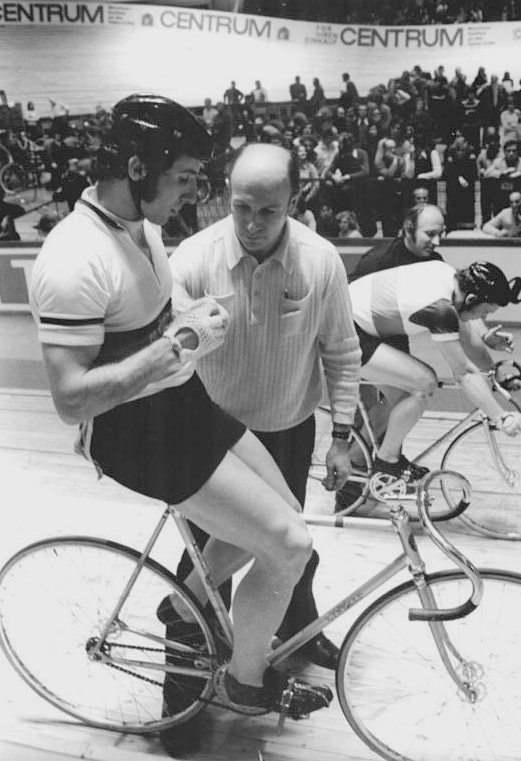
- Geschke (left) in 1975

Personal information
- Full name: Hans-Jürgen Geschke
- Nickname: Tutti
- Born: 7 July 1943 (age 83) Berlin, Germany
- Height: 168 cm (5 ft 6 in)
- Weight: 70 kg (154 lb)

Cycling career
- Sport: Cycling
Medal record
Representing East Germany
Men's track cycling
Olympic Games
| Silver medal – second place | 1972 Munich | Tandem |
| Bronze medal – third place | 1976 Montreal | 1000 m sprint |
World Championships
| Gold medal – first place | 1969 Brno | Tandem |
| Silver medal – second place | 1970 Leicester | Tandem |
| Gold medal – first place | 1971 Varese | Tandem |
| Bronze medal – third place | 1973 San Sebastián | Tandem |
| Gold medal – first place | 1977 San Cristóbal | Sprint |

Hans-Jürgen Geschke (also known as Tutti, born 7 July 1943) is a German former track cyclist who competed for East Germany in the 1968, 1972 and 1976 Olympics. After having won the silver medal in the 2000 m tandem, alongside Werner Otto, he claimed the bronze medal in the 1000 m sprint in 1976. At the world championships Geschke and Otto won two gold, one silver and one bronze medal in the tandem in 1969–1973, and Geschke added a sprint gold in 1977. In 1967 and 1970 he won the International Champion of Champions sprint at Herne Hill velodrome.

Geschke is the father of road racing cyclist Simon Geschke.
