= Taworn Tarwan =

Thai cyclist

Personal information
- Born: 9 September 1947 (age 79)
- Height: 164 cm (5 ft 5 in)
- Weight: 52 kg (115 lb)

Cycling career
- Sport: Cycling
Medal record
Men's cycling
Representing Thailand
Southeast Asian Peninsular Games
Gold medal – first place	1973 Singapore	1600m team time trial
Asian Championships
Bronze medal – third place	1971 Singapore	1600m team time

Taworn Tarwan (ถาวร ทาวัน; born 9 September 1947) is a Thai former cyclist. He competed at the 1972 Summer Olympics and 1976 Summer Olympics.
