= Robert Cogniaux =

Belgian archer (born 1934)

- Born: 29 May 1934 (age 90); Asse, Belgium
- Occupation: Archery
- Known for: Competing at three Summer Olympics

Robert Cogniaux (born 29 May 1934) is a Belgian archer. He competed for Belgium at the 1972, 1976 and 1980 Summer Olympics. His highest position there was a fourth place in 1972 in Munich, West Germany.
