= Klaas Balk =

Dutch cyclist (born 1948)

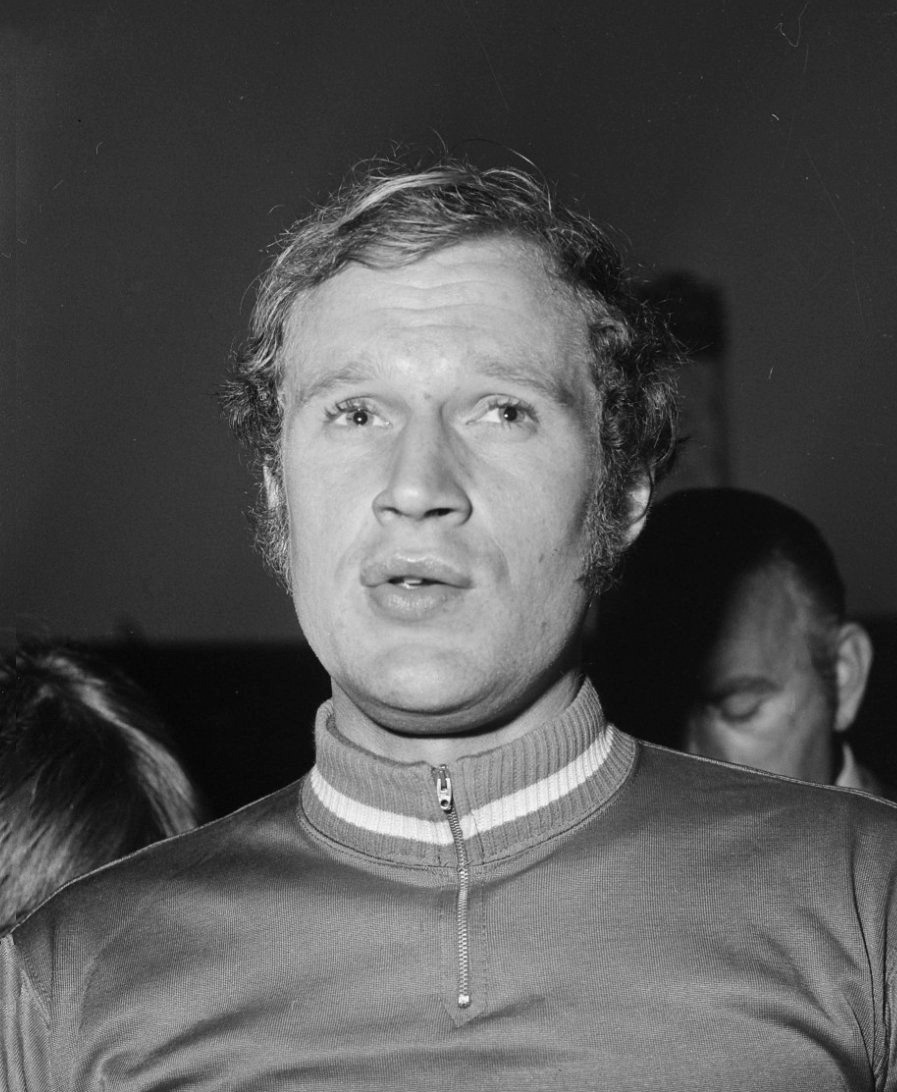
- Klaas Balk in 1972

Personal information
- Born: 27 December 1948 (age 77) Badhoevedorp, Netherlands
- Height: 1.82 m (6 ft 0 in)
- Weight: 78 kg (172 lb)

Sport
- Sport: Cycling
Medal record
Representing the Netherlands
UCI Track Cycling World Championships
Bronze medal – third place	1969 Antwerp	1 km

Klaas Cornelis Hendrik Balk (born 27 December 1948) is a retired Dutch cyclist who was active between 1967 and 1974, mostly on track. He competed at the 1968 and 1972 Summer Olympics in three events in total. In 1968, his team failed to reach the final in the 4 km pursuit. In 1972, he finished in fourth and fifth place in the individual sprint and 2 km tandem sprint. He won a bronze medal in the 1 km sprint at the 1969 world championships.

On the road, Balk won one stage of the Olympia's Tour in 1971 and 1972.

== See also ==
- List of Dutch Olympic cyclists
