= Howard Fenton =

Jamaican cyclist (born 1952)

Personal information
- Born: 6 February 1952 (age 74)

Cycling career
- Sport: Cycling

Howard Fenton (born 6 February 1952) is a Jamaican former cyclist. He competed in four events at the 1972 Summer Olympics.
