= Peter van Doorn =

Dutch cyclist (born 1946)

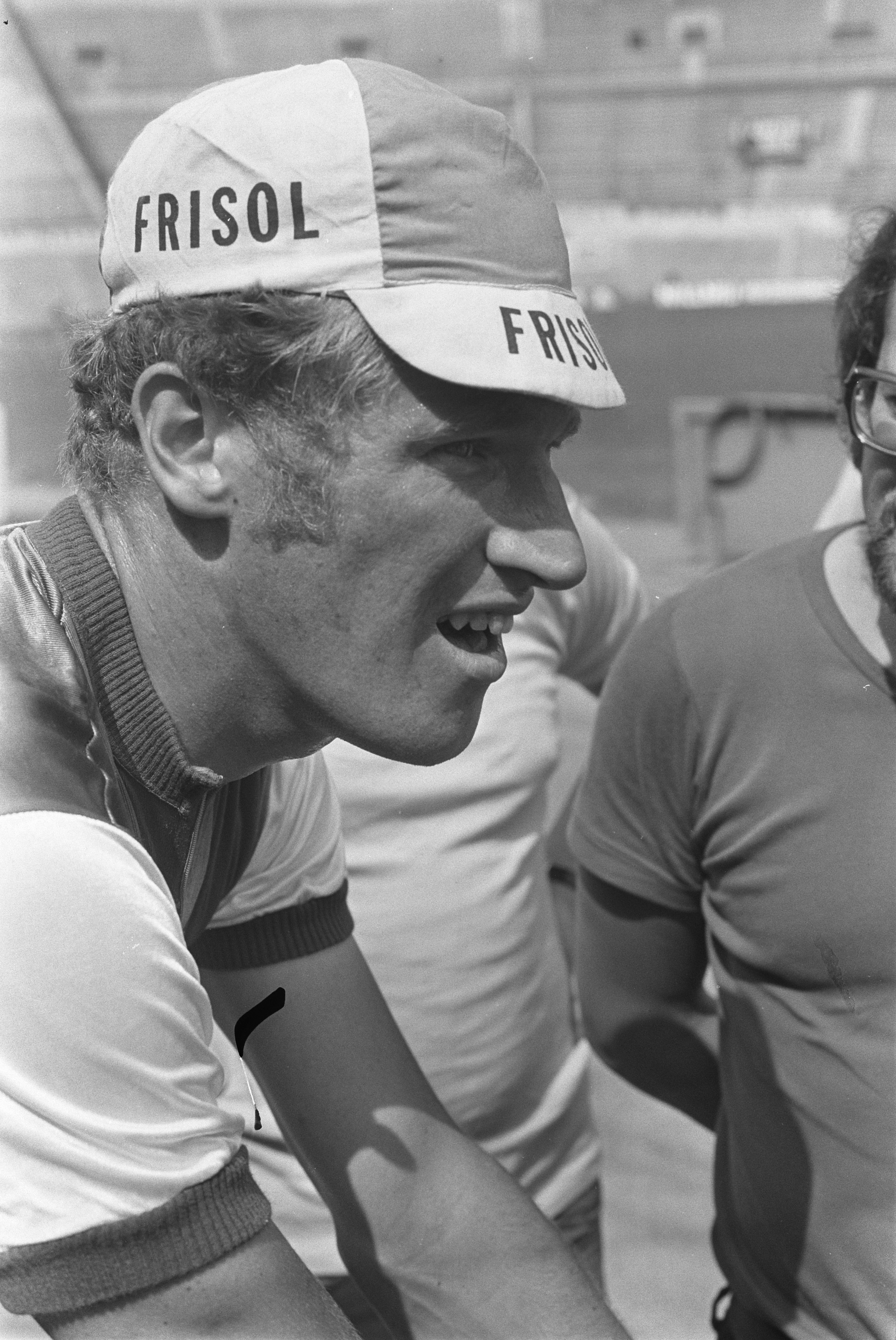
- Peter van Doorn in 1972

Personal information
- Born: 29 January 1946 (age 80) Berlicum, the Netherlands
- Height: 1.83 m (6 ft 0 in)
- Weight: 85 kg (187 lb)

Sport
- Sport: Cycling

Pieter "Peter" van Doorn (born 29 January 1946) was a Dutch cyclist who was active between 1969 and 1975. Between 1969 and 1972, he won four consecutive national titles in the tandem. He competed at the 1972 Summer Olympics in the sprint, 1 km time trial and 2 km tandem events and finished in fifth, eleventh and fifth place, respectively.

== See also ==
- List of Dutch Olympic cyclists
