= Igor Tselovalnikov =

Soviet cyclist

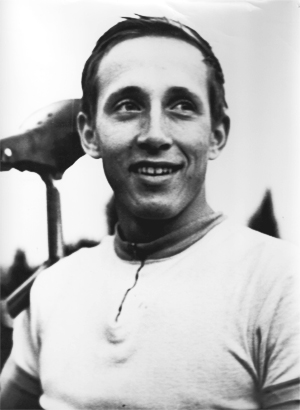

Personal information
- Born: 2 January 1944 Yerevan, Armenian SSR, Soviet Union
- Died: 17 March 1986 (aged 42) Kharkiv, Ukrainian SSR, Soviet Union
- Education: University of Kharkiv
- Height: 1.74 m (5 ft 9 in)
- Weight: 75 kg (165 lb)

Sport
- Sport: Cycling
- Club: Burevestnik Kharkiv
Medal record
Representing the Soviet Union
Olympic Games
Gold medal – first place	1972 Munich	Tandem sprint

Ihor Vasilyevich Tselovalnikov (Russian: Игорь Васильевич Целовальников; Ukrainian: Ігор Васильович Целовальніков; 2 January 1944 – 17 March 1986) was a Soviet cyclist. He competed at the 1968 and 1972 Summer Olympics in the 2000 m tandem sprint and finished in fifth and first place, respectively. Tselovalnykov represented the Burevestnik of the Ukrainian SSR.

Nationally he won four titles in the tandem sprint (1967, 1971–1974) and one in the 1000 m track time trial.

He graduated from the University of Kharkiv with a degree in economics (1969) and then from the Saint Petersburg Military Institute of Physical Education (1977). Between 1969 and 1972 he served in the Soviet Army, and after 1977 worked as a lecturer at the Kharkiv Military School of Missile Troops.
