= Yoshikazu Cho =

Japanese cyclist (born 1953)

Personal information
- Born: 3 October 1953 (age 73) Osaka Prefecture, Japan

Cycling career
- Sport: Cycling

Yoshikazu Cho (長 義和, Chō Yoshikazu; born 3 October 1953) is a Japanese former cyclist. He competed at the 1972 Summer Olympics and 1976 Summer Olympics.
