= Shue Ming-fa =

Taiwanese cyclist

Personal information
- Full name: 許 明發, Pinyin: Xǔ Míng-fā
- Born: 2 November 1950 (age 75)

Cycling career
- Sport: Cycling

Shue Ming-fa (born 2 November 1950) is a former Taiwanese cyclist. He competed in three events at the 1972 Summer Olympics.
