= Football at the 1972 Summer Olympics – Men's team squads =

The following squads were named for the 1972 Summer Olympics tournament.

== Brazil ==
Head coach: Antoninho

No.	Pos.	Player	DoB	Age	Caps	Club	Tournament games	Tournament goals	Minutes played	Sub off	Sub on	Cards yellow/red
1	GK	Vitor	Nov 21, 1953	18	?	(Brazil) Cruzeiro	0	0	0	0	0	0
2	DF	Osmar	Feb 18, 1952	20	?	(Brazil) Botafogo	2	0	180	0	0	(yellow card) 1
3	DF	Fred	Apr 4, 1949	23	?	(Brazil) Flamengo	1	0	90	0	0	0
4	DF	Terezo	Oct 7, 1953	18	?	(Brazil) América	3	0	270	0	0	0
5	MD	Falcão	Oct 16, 1953	18	?	(Brazil) Internacional	3	0	166	1	1	0
6	DF	Celso	Oct 2, 1950	21	?	(Brazil) Palmeiras	2	0	157	1	0	0
7	FW	Pedrinho	Aug 4, 1953	19	?	(Brazil) Internacional	2	1	152	1	0	0
8	MD	Rubens Galaxe	Sep 29, 1952	19	?	(Brazil) Fluminense	3	0	270	0	0	0
9	FW	Washington	Jan 23, 1951	21	?	(Brazil) Guarani	3	0	180	0	2	0
10	FW	Roberto Dinamite	Mar 13, 1954	18	?	(Brazil) Vasco da Gama	1	0	45	1	0	0
11	FW	Dirceu	Jun 15, 1952	20	?	(Brazil) Coritiba	3	2	270	0	0	0
12	GK	Nielsen	Jun 19, 1952	20	?	(Brazil) Fluminense	3	0	270	0	0	0
13	DF	Abel	Sep 1, 1952	19	?	(Brazil) Fluminense	2	0	180	0	0	0
14	DF	Wágner	May 2, 1950	22	?	(Brazil) Corinthians	1	0	90	0	0	(yellow card) 1
15	MD	Bolívar	Dec 21, 1954	17	?	(Brazil) Grêmio	1	0	23	0	1	0
16	MD	Ângelo	May 30, 1953	19	?	(Brazil) Atlético Mineiro	2	0	104	1	1	0
17	MD	Pintinho	Jun 25, 1954	18	?	(Brazil) Fluminense	0	0	0	0	0	0
18	FW	Zé Carlos	Mar 17, 1954	18	?	(Brazil) Santa Cruz	3	1	163	0	2	0
19	FW	Manoel	Feb 14, 1953	19	?	(Brazil) Internacional	2	0	180	0	0	0

== Burma ==
Head coach: U Sein Hlaing

No.	Pos.	Player	DoB	Age	Caps	Club	Tournament games	Tournament goals	Minutes played	Sub off	Sub on	Cards yellow/red
1	GK	Tin Aung	May 8, 1947	25	?	(Myanmar) Army	3	0	270	0	0	0
2	DF	Win Sein	Jul 11, 1952	20	?	(Myanmar) Army	0	0	0	0	0	0
3	DF	Maung Maung Tin	May 21, 1949	23	?	(Myanmar) Post & Telecomms	3	0	270	0	0	0
4	DF	Tin Sein	Jun 12, 1951	21	?	(Myanmar) Army	3	0	270	0	0	0
5	DF	Myo Win Nyunt	Feb 19, 1950	22	?	(Myanmar) Customs	3	0	270	0	0	0
6	MF	Ryint Soe	Mar 15, 1955	17	?	(Myanmar) Municipal	0	0	0	0	0	0
7	DF	San Aye	Jun 20, 1954	18	?	(Myanmar) Construction	3	0	270	0	0	0
8	MF	Aye Maung Gyi	Aug 20, 1950	22	?	(Myanmar) Construction	3	0	270	0	0	0
9	MF	Aye Maung Lay	Jun 10, 1954	18	?	(Myanmar) Air Force	3	0	270	0	0	0
10	FW	Kyu Myint	Aug 20, 1950	22	?	(Myanmar) Trade	1	0	22	0	1	0
11	MF	Ye Nyunt	Jun 3, 1950	22	?	(Myanmar) Customs	3	0	266	1	0	0
12	FW	Maung Win	May 12, 1949	23	?	(Myanmar) Army	3	0	270	0	0	0
13	FW	Than Soe	Jun 3, 1952	20	?	(Myanmar) Municipal	3	1	270	0	0	0
14	FW	Tin Aung Moe	Jun 12, 1949	23	?	(Myanmar) Construction	3	1	248	1	0	0
15	FW	Htay Hla	Mar 18, 1940	32	?		0	0	0	0	0	0
16	FW	Khin Maung Lay	Jul 5, 1954	18	?	(Myanmar) Navy	1	0	4	0	1	0
17	GK	Nyunt Maung Maung	Jan 18, 1954	18	?		0	0	0	0	0	0
18	MF	Maung Tun Khin	Sep 21, 1940	31	?		0	0	0	0	0	0
19	MF	Win Lay Sein	Mar 14, 1950	22	?		0	0	0	0	0	0

== Colombia ==
Head coach: (Socialist Federal Republic of Yugoslavia) Todor Veselinovic

No.	Pos.	Player	DoB	Age	Caps	Club	Tournament games	Tournament goals	Minutes played	Sub off	Sub on	Cards yellow/red
1	GK	Silvio Quintero	Dec 27, 1946	25	?	(Colombia) Deportes Tolima	1	0	90	0	0	0
2	GK	Antonio Rivas	Nov 4, 1951	20	?	(Colombia) Independiente Santa Fe	2	0	180	0	0	0
3	DF	Gerardo Moncada	May 27, 1949	23	?	(Colombia) Atlético Nacional	3	0	270	0	0	(yellow card) 1
4	DF	Rafael Reyes	May 17, 1951	21	?	(Colombia) Deportes Tolima	2	0	147	1	0	0
5	DF	Álvaro Calle	Jun 11, 1953	19	?	(Colombia) Independiente Medellín	2	0	180	0	0	0
6	DF	Dumas Guette	Dec 25, 1952	19	?	(Colombia) Deportes Tolima	2	0	180	0	0	0
7	MD	Fabio Espinosa	Jun 13, 1948	24	?	(Colombia) Deportes Tolima	3	1	225	0	1	(yellow card) 1
8	FW	Carlos Lugo	Sep 1, 1953	18	?	(Colombia) Deportes Tolima	3	0	158	1	1	(yellow card) 1
9	FW	Jaime Morón	Nov 16, 1950	21	?	(Colombia) Millonarios	3	2	270	0	0	0
10	MD	Henry Caicedo	Jul 18, 1951	21	?	(Colombia) Deportivo Cali	0	0	0	0	0	0
11	FW	Álvaro Santamaría	Mar 21, 1950	22	?	(Colombia) Independiente Medellín	2	0	167	1	0	0
12	MD	Willington Ortiz	Mar 26, 1952	20	?	(Colombia) Millonarios	3	0	270	0	0	0
13	MD	Ernesto Díaz	Sep 13, 1952	19	?	(Colombia) Independiente Santa Fe	3	0	212	2	0	0
14	GK	Armando Acosta	Jan 10, 1951	21	?	(Colombia) Once Caldas	0	0	0	0	0	0
15	DF	Vicente Revellón	Jun 4, 1950	22	?	(Colombia) Independiente Santa Fe	2	0	123	0	1	0
16	MD	Domingo González	Dec 24, 1947	24	?	(Colombia) Independiente Santa Fe	1	0	45	1	0	0
17	DF	Orlando Rivas	Jul 17, 1950	21	?	(Colombia) América de Cali	3	0	270	0	0	0
18	FW	Luis Montaño	Aug 11, 1950	21	?	(Colombia) Independiente Santa Fe	1	1	23	0	1	0
19	FW	Ángel María Torres	May 8, 1952	20	?	(Colombia) Deportivo Cali	3	1	180	0	2	0

== Denmark ==
Head coach: (Austria) Rudi Strittich

No.	Pos.	Player	DoB	Age	Caps	Club	Tournament games	Tournament goals	Minutes played	Sub off	Sub on	Cards yellow/red
1	GK	Mogens Therkildsen	Mar 15, 1940	32	7	(Denmark) OB	6	0	495	1	0	0
2	DF	Flemming Ahlberg	Dec 23, 1946	25	5	(Denmark) BK Frem	6	0	540	0	0	0
3	DF	Svend Andresen	May 20, 1950	22	16	(Denmark) B1903	6	0	540	0	0	(yellow card) 1
4	DF	Per Røntved	Jan 27, 1949	23	15	(Denmark) Brønshøj BK	6	1	540	0	0	(yellow card) 1
5	DF	Jørgen Rasmussen	Jul 4, 1945	26	15	(Denmark) Randers Freja	6	0	519	1	0	0
6	MD	Hans Ewald Hansen	Feb 15, 1944	28	8	(Denmark) B1901	4	0	215	2	1	(yellow card) 1
7	MD	Jack Hansen	Oct 2, 1947	24	5	(Denmark) B1913	6	0	540	0	0	0
8	FW	Kristen Nygaard	Sep 9, 1949	22	14	(Denmark) IF Fuglebakken	6	1	518	1	0	(yellow card) 1
9	FW	Allan Simonsen	Dec 15, 1952	19	2	(Denmark) Vejle BK	6	3	450	2	0	(yellow card) 1
10	FW	Kurt Berthelsen	Nov 27, 1943	28	1	(Denmark) AaB	0	0	0	0	0	0
11	FW	Leif Printzlau	Dec 16, 1948	23	5	(Denmark) BK Frem	2	1	72	0	2	0
12	DF	Flemming Pedersen	Sep 2, 1947	24	7	(Denmark) KB	1	0	21	0	0	0
13	DF	Helge Vonsyld	Oct 18, 1947	24	0	(Denmark) Randers Freja	0	0	0	0	0	0
14	MD	Sten Ziegler	May 30, 1950	22	6	(Denmark) Hvidovre IF	2	0	122	0	1	0
15	MD	Max Rasmussen	Dec 11, 1945	26	1	(Denmark) AB	4	0	270	1	1	0
16	MD	Heino Hansen	Sep 24, 1947	24	2	(Denmark) Slagelse B&I	6	3	514	1	0	0
17	FW	Keld Bak	Jun 7, 1944	27	7	(Denmark) Næstved IF	6	2	540	0	0	0
18	GK	Heinz Hildebrandt	Feb 13, 1943	29	1	(Denmark) Hvidovre IF	1	0	45	0	1	0
19	GK	Valdemar Hansen	May 19, 1945	27	1	(Denmark) BK Frem	0	0	0	0	0	0

== East Germany ==
Head coach: Georg Buschner

No.	Pos.	Player	DoB	Age	Caps	Club	Tournament games	Tournament goals	Minutes played	Sub off	Sub on	Cards yellow/red
1	GK	Jürgen Croy	Oct 19, 1946	25	?	(East Germany) Sachsenring Zwickau	7	0	660	0	0	0
2	DF	Lothar Kurbjuweit	Nov 6, 1950	21	?	(East Germany) FC Carl Zeiss Jena	4	0	337	3	0	0
3	DF	Manfred Zapf	Aug 24, 1946	25	?	(East Germany) 1. FC Magdeburg	7	0	660	0	0	(yellow card) 1
4	DF	Konrad Weise	Aug 17, 1951	20	?	(East Germany) FC Carl Zeiss Jena	7	0	660	0	0	0
5	DF	Bernd Bransch	Sep 24, 1944	27	?	(East Germany) FC Carl Zeiss Jena	7	0	660	0	0	0
6	MD	Harald Irmscher	Feb 12, 1946	26	?	(East Germany) FC Carl Zeiss Jena	4	0	150	0	3	0
7	MD	Jürgen Pommerenke	Jan 22, 1953	19	?	(East Germany) 1. FC Magdeburg	7	1	543	2	1	0
8	FW	Ralf Schulenberg	Aug 15, 1949	22	?	(East Germany) BFC Dynamo	2	0	34	0	2	0
9	FW	Jürgen Sparwasser	Jun 8, 1948	24	?	(East Germany) 1. FC Magdeburg	7	6	660	0	0	0
10	MD	Hans-Jürgen Kreische	Jun 19, 1947	25	?	(East Germany) Dynamo Dresden	7	5	660	0	0	(yellow card) 1
11	FW	Joachim Streich	Apr 13, 1951	21	?	(East Germany) Hansa Rostock	7	6	626	2	0	(yellow card) 1
12	MD	Reinhard Häfner	Feb 2, 1952	20	?	(East Germany) Dynamo Dresden	1	1	12	0	1	0
13	MD	Wolfgang Seguin	Spe 14, 1945	26	?	(East Germany) 1. FC Magdeburg	4	0	333	2	0	0
14	FW	Peter Ducke	Oct 14, 1941	30	?	(East Germany) FC Carl Zeiss Jena	7	1	592	3	0	(yellow card) 2
15	FW	Eberhard Vogel	Apr 8, 1943	29	?	(East Germany) FC Carl Zeiss Jena	5	2	129	0	5	0
16	MD	Axel Tyll	Jul 21, 1953	18	?	(East Germany) 1. FC Magdeburg	0	0	0	0	0	0
17	DF	Siegmar Wätzlich	Nov 16, 1947	24	?	(East Germany) Dynamo Dresden	3	0	254	1	0	(yellow card) 1
18	MD	Frank Ganzera	Sep 8, 1945	26	?	(East Germany) Dynamo Dresden	4	1	290	1	0	0
19	GK	Dieter Schneider	Oct 20, 1949	22	?	(East Germany) Hansa Rostock	0	0	0	0	0	0

== Ghana ==
Head coach: Charles Gyamfi

No.	Pos.	Player	DoB	Age	Caps	Club	Tournament games	Tournament goals	Minutes played	Sub off	Sub on	Cards yellow/red
1	GK	Henry France			?	(Ghana) Hearts of Oak	1	0	90	0	0	0
2	DF	Armah Akuetteh			?	(Ghana) Hearts of Oak	2	0	153	0	1	0
3	DF	Oliver Acquah			?	(Ghana) Asante Kotoko	2	0	180	0	0	0
4	DF	Alex Mingle			?	(Ghana) Cape Coast Dwarfs	3	0	270	0	0	0
5	DF	John Eshun	Jul 17, 1942	30	?	(Ghana) Hasaacas	3	0	270	0	0	0
6	MD	Ibrahim Sunday	Jul 22, 1944	28	?	(Ghana) Asante Kotoko	3	1	270	0	0	(yellow card) 1
7	MD	Albert Essuman			?	(Ghana) Asante Kotoko	0	0	0	0	0	0
8	FW	Peter Lamptey	Apr 6, 1946	26	?	(Ghana) Hearts of Oak	3	0	153	0	2	0
9	FW	Gariba Abukari			?	(Ghana) Asante Kotoko	3	0	270	0	0	0
10	FW	Joe Sam			?	(Ghana) Asante Kotoko	0	0	0	0	0	0
11	MD	Malik Jabir	Dec 8, 1944	27	?	(Ghana) Asante Kotoko	3	0	270	0	0	0
12	DF	Edward Boye			?	(Ghana) Great Olympics	2	0	72	1	1	0
13	MD	Samuel Yaw			?	(Ghana) Asante Kotoko	3	0	270	0	0	0
14	DF	Clifford Odame			?	(Ghana) Asante Kotoko	2	0	135	0	1	0
15	FW	Kwasi Owusu	Nov 7, 1947	24	?	(Ghana) Bofoakwa Tano	2	0	180	0	0	0
16	MD	Joseph Ghartey			?	(Ghana) Hearts of Oak	1	0	90	0	0	0
17	MD	Osei Kofi	Jun 3, 1940	32	?	(Ghana) Asante Kotoko	2	0	117	2	0	0
18	GK	Essul Badu Mensah			?	(Ghana) Asante Kotoko	2	0	180	0	0	0
19	GK	Joseph Derchie			?	(Ghana) Bofoakwa Tano	0	0	0	0	0	0

== Hungary ==
Head coach: Rudolf Illovszky

No.	Pos.	Player	DoB	Age	Caps	Club	Tournament games	Tournament goals	Minutes played	Sub off	Sub on	Cards yellow/red
1	GK	István Géczi	Jul 13, 1944	28	15	(Hungary) Ferencváros	7	0	610	1	0	0
2	DF	Péter Vépi	Oct 20, 1949	22	2	(Hungary) Ferencváros	7	0	630	0	0	(yellow card) 1
3	DF	Miklós Páncsics	Feb 4, 1944	28	30	(Hungary) Ferencváros	7	0	630	0	0	(yellow card) 2
4	DF	Péter Juhász	Aug 3, 1948	23	17	(Hungary) Újpesti Dózsa	6	1	540	0	0	(yellow card) 1
5	FW	Lajos Szűcs	Dec 10, 1943	28	29	(Hungary) Honvéd	7	0	630	0	0	(yellow card) 1
6	MD	Csaba Vidáts	Nov 22, 1947	25	15	(Hungary) Vasas SC	2	0	157	1	0	(yellow card) 1
7	MD	Mihály Kozma	Nov 1, 1949	22	6	(Hungary) Honvéd	4	1	347	1	0	0
8	FW	Kálmán Tóth	Aug 13, 1944	27	0	(Hungary) Tatabánya	5	1	294	0	2	0
9	FW	Antal Dunai	Mar 21, 1943	29	24	(Hungary) Újpesti Dózsa	7	7	602	2	0	0
10	MD	Lajos Kü	Jul 5, 1948	24	5	(Hungary) Ferencváros	6	2	290	2	3	(yellow card) 1
11	FW	Béla Várady	Apr 12, 1945	27	0	(Hungary) Vasas SC	5	2	377	0	1	0
12	MD	József Kovács	Apr 8, 1949	23	3	(Hungary) Videoton	3	0	270	0	0	0
13	GK	Imre Rapp	Sep 15, 1937	34	0	(Hungary) Pécsi Mecsek FC	0	0	0	0	0	0
14	DF	Ede Dunai	Jun 14, 1949	23	6	(Hungary) Újpesti Dózsa	5	3	450	0	0	(yellow card) 1
15	MD	László Branikovits	Dec 18, 1949	22	2	(Hungary) Ferencváros	3	0	194	0	1	(yellow card) 1
16	DF	László Bálint	Feb 1, 1948	24	8	(Hungary) Ferencváros	5	0	450	0	0	(yellow card) 1
17	MD	Lajos Kocsis	Jun 17, 1947	25	18	(Hungary) Honvéd	6	1	349	3	2	0
18	FW	István Básti	Sep 19, 1944	27	?	(Hungary) Salgótarjáni	0	0	0	0	0	0
19	GK	Ádám Rothermel	Jun 14, 1948	24	9	(Hungary) Tatabánya	1	0	20	0	1	0

== Iran ==
Head coach: Mahmoud Bayati

No.	Pos.	Player	DoB	Age	Caps	Club	Tournament games	Tournament goals	Minutes played	Sub off	Sub on	Cards yellow/red
1	GK	Reza Ghoflsaz	Feb 21, 1950	22	?	(Iran) Pas	0	0	0	0	0	0
2	DF	Ebrahim Ashtiani	Jan 4, 1942	30	?	(Iran) Persepolis	3	0	270	0	0	0
3	DF	Jafar Kashani	Mar 4, 1945	27	?	(Iran) Persepolis	2	0	180	0	0	0
4	DF	Majid Halvaei	Jul 2, 1948	23	?	(Iran) Pas	3	1	270	0	0	(yellow card) 1
5	DF	Akbar Kargarjam	Dec 26, 1947	22	?	(Iran) Taj	3	0	270	0	0	0
6	MD	Parviz Ghelichkhani	Dec 4, 1945	26	?	(Iran) Pas	3	0	270	0	0	0
7	MD	Ali Parvin	Oct 12, 1946	25	?	(Iran) Persepolis	3	0	270	0	0	0
8	MD	Ali Jabbari	Jul 20, 1946	22	?	(Iran) Taj	1	0	63	1	0	0
9	MD	Mohammad Sadeghi	Mar 16, 1952	20	?	(Iran) Pas	2	0	180	0	0	0
10	FW	Safar Iranpak	Dec 23, 1947	24	?	(Iran) Persepolis	3	0	261	1	0	0
11	FW	Asghar Sharafi	Dec 22, 1942	29	?	(Iran) Pas	1	0	90	0	0	0
12	MD	Gholam Vafakhah	Feb 23, 1946	25	?	(Iran) Taj	3	0	207	0	1	0
13	MD	Javad Ghorab	Jul 30, 1941	31	?	(Iran) Taj	1	0	90	0	0	0
14	FW	Mahmoud Khordbin	Sep 24, 1948	23	?	(Iran) Persepolis	2	0	146	0	1	0
15	FW	Mehdi Lavasani	Jul 11, 1947	25	?	(Iran) Taj	1	0	90	0	0	0
16	MD	Alireza Azizi	Jan 14, 1949	23	?	(Iran) Homa	1	0	9	0	1	0
17	DF	Javad Allahverdi	Apr 9, 1952	20	?	(Iran) Taj	0	0	0	0	0	0
18	DF	Mehdi Monajati	Jun 29, 1946	26	?	(Iran) Pas	1	0	34	1	0	0
19	GK	Mansour Rashidi	Nov 12, 1948	23	?	(Iran) Taj	3	0	270	0	0	0

== Malaysia ==
Head coach: Jalil Che Din

No.	Pos.	Player	DoB	Age	Caps	Club	Tournament games	Tournament goals	Minutes played	Sub off	Sub on	Cards yellow/red
1	GK	Wong Kam Fook	Dec. 03, 1949	23	?	(Malaysia) Perak	3	0	207	1	0	0
2	DF	Abdullah Othman	Mar 13, 1945	27	?	(Malaysia) Johor	3	0	270	0	0	0
3	DF	Soh Chin Aun	Jul 19, 1948	24	?	(Malaysia) Selangor	3	0	270	0	0	0
4	DF	Namat Abdullah	Mar 12, 1945	27	?	(Malaysia) Penang	3	0	270	0	0	0
5	DF	Mohamed Chandran	May 4, 1942	30	?	(Malaysia) Selangor	3	0	270	0	0	0
6	FW	Khoo Huan Khen	Mar 27, 1951	21	?	(Malaysia) Perak	0	0	0	0	0	0
7	MD	Hamzah Hussain	Aug 8, 1948	23	?	(Malaysia) Kelantan	3	0	188	0	1	0
8	MD	Shahruddin Abdullah	Sep 29, 1949	22	?	(Malaysia) Penang	3	1	248	1	0	0
9	MD	Wan Zawawi	Apr 11, 1949	23	?	(Malaysia) Kelantan	3	1	270	0	0	0
10	DF	V. Krishnasamy	Jan 13, 1948	24	?	(Malaysia) Perak	0	0	0	0	0	0
11	MD	Ibrahim Salleh	Nov 1, 1947	24	?	(Malaysia) Terengganu	3	1	270	0	0	0
12	FW	Harun Jusoh			?	(Malaysia) Kelantan	0	0	0	0	0	0
13	GK	Lim Fung Kee	Mar 24, 1950	22	?	(Malaysia) Selangor	1	0	63	0	1	0
14	MD	Wong Choon Wah	Mar 31, 1947	25	?	(Malaysia) Selangor	3	0	262	1	0	0
15	DF	Ali Bakar	Nov 18, 1947	24	?	(Malaysia) Penang	0	0	0	0	0	0
16	MD	Mohammed Bakar	Jun 25, 1945	27	?	(Malaysia) Penang	1	0	22	0	1	0
17	FW	Looi Loon Teik	Feb 15, 1945	27	?	(Malaysia) Kedah	3	0	209	0	1	0
18	FW	Abdullah Rahim	Sep 12, 1947	24	?	(Malaysia) Selangor	1	0	61	1	0	(yellow card) 1
19	MD	Bahwandi Hiralal	Jun 1, 1951	21	?	(Malaysia) Selangor	1	0	90	0	0	0

== Mexico ==
Head coach: Diego Mercado

No.	Pos.	Player	DoB	Age	Caps	Club	Tournament games	Tournament goals	Minutes played	Sub off	Sub on	Cards yellow/red
1	GK	Rogelio Ruiz	Aug 20, 1950	22	?	No club (amateur)	1	0	90	0	0	0
2		Jesús Rico	Jan 11, 1953	19	?	No club (amateur)	6	0	457	0	1	0
3		José Luis Trejo	Aug 4, 1951	20	?	No club (amateur)	6	0	540	0	0	0
4		Juan Manuel Álvarez	Apr 12, 1948	24	?	No club (amateur)	6	0	495	1	0	(yellow card) 3
5		Enrique Martín	Dec 27, 1950	21	?	No club (amateur)	6	0	533	1	0	0
6		Alejandro Hernández	Mar 11, 1948	24	?	No club (amateur)	5	0	450	0	0	(yellow card) 1
7		Fernando Blanco	Jun 4, 1951	21	?	No club (amateur)	5	0	434	1	0	0
8		Lorenzo Reyes	Aug 10, 1951	21	?	No club (amateur)	2	0	129	2	0	0
9		Manuel Manzo	May 10, 1952	20	?	No club (amateur)	6	1	483	1	1	0
10		Daniel Razo	Sep 26, 1950	21	?	No club (amateur)	5	1	437	0	0	0
11	MF	Leonardo Cuéllar	Jan 14, 1954	18	?	No club (amateur)	5	2	450	0	0	0
12	GK	Horacio Sánchez	Mar 27, 1953	19	?	No club (amateur)	5	0	450	0	0	0
13		Francisco Barba	Aug 7, 1953	19	?	No club (amateur)	1	0	90	0	0	0
14		Salvador Márquez	Dec 24, 1950	21	?	No club (amateur)	1	0	90	0	0	0
15		José Talavera	Aug 2, 1950	22	?	No club (amateur)	3	0	141	0	2	0
16		David Regalado	Jan 17, 1952	22	?	No club (amateur)	2	0	106	0	1	0
17		Alfredo Hernández	Jan 12, 1951	21	?	No club (amateur)	3	0	114	0	2	0
18		Alejandro Peña	Oct 20, 1949	22	?	No club (amateur)	4	0	360	0	0	0
19		Manuel Borja	Aug 29, 1949	22	?	No club (amateur)	1	0	90	0	0	(yellow card) 1

== Morocco ==
Head coach: (Spain) Sabino Barinaga

No.	Pos.	Player	DoB	Age	Caps	Club	Tournament games	Tournament goals	Minutes played	Sub off	Sub on	Cards yellow/red
1	GK	Allal Benkassou	Nov 30, 1941	31	?	(Morocco) FAR Rabat	0	0	0	0	0	0
2	DF	Boujemaa Benkhrif	Nov 30, 1947	25	?	(Morocco) KAC Kenitra	6	1	472	1	0	0
3	DF	Larbi Ihardane	Jun 6, 1954	18	?	(Morocco) Wydad Casablanca	6	0	540	0	0	(yellow card) 2
4	DF	Abdallah Lamrani	1946	26	?	(Morocco) FAR Rabat	5	0	450	0	0	(yellow card) 1
5		Khalifa El-Bakhti	1950	22	?	(Morocco) FAR Rabat	6	0	540	0	0	(yellow card) 1
6	MD	Mustapha Yaghcha	Nov 7, 1952	19	?	(Morocco) Difaa El Jadida	6	0	408	3	2	(yellow card) 1
7	MD	Abdallah Tazi	1945	27	?	(Morocco) MAS Fes	6	0	355	2	2	0
8	MD	Abdelâali Zahraoui	Jan 9, 1949	23	?	(Morocco) FAR Rabat	4	0	315	1	0	(yellow card) 1
9	FW	Ahmed Faras	Dec 7, 1946	25	?	(Morocco) Mohammedia	5	3	450	0	0	(yellow card) 1
10		Mohamed Zouita	1944		?	(Morocco) KAC Kenitra	3	1	146	0	2	0
11	MD	Maouhoub Ghazouani	1946	24	?	(Morocco) FAR Rabat	5	0	361	2	1	(yellow card) 2 (red card) 1
12	GK	Mohamed Hazzaz	Nov 30, 1944	26	?	(Morocco) MAS Fes	6	0	495	1	0	0
13		Abdelmajid Hadry	1952	20	?	(Morocco) Raja Casablanca	2	0	180	0	0	0
14		Ahmed Najah	1947	25	?	(Morocco) Raja Beni Mellal	5	0	426	1	0	(yellow card) 1
15		Abdel Fattah Jafri	Feb 25, 1950	22	?	(Morocco) Sidi Kacem	1	0	24	0	0	0
16	FW	Mohamed El Filali	Jul 9, 1945	27	?	(Morocco) Mouloudia Oujda	6	1	479	0	1	0
17		Mustapha El-Zaghrari	1949	23	?	(Morocco) Wydad Casablanca	1	0	20	0	1	0
18	MD	Mohamed Merzaq	1951	21	?	(Morocco) Mouloudia Oujda	4	1	254	1	1	0
19	GK	Ahmed Belkorchi	1952	20	?	(Morocco) KAC Marrakech	1	0	45	0	1	0

== Poland ==
Head coach: Kazimierz Górski

No.	Pos.	Player	DoB	Age	Caps	Club	Tournament games	Tournament goals	Minutes played	Sub off	Sub on	Cards yellow/red
1	GK	Hubert Kostka	May 27, 1940	32	25	(Poland) Górnik Zabrze	7	0	630	0	0	0
2	DF	Antoni Szymanowski	Jan 13, 1951	21	8	(Poland) Wisła Kraków	6	0	540	0	0	0
3	DF	Jerzy Gorgoń	Jul 18, 1949	22	8	(Poland) Górnik Zabrze	7	2	577	1	0	0
4	DF	Zygmunt Anczok	Mar 14, 1946	26	40	(Poland) Górnik Zabrze	7	0	630	0	0	0
5	MD	Lesław Ćmikiewicz	Aug 25, 1948	23	8	(Poland) Legia Warsaw	7	0	606	1	0	(yellow card) 1
6	MD	Zygmunt Maszczyk	May 3, 1945	27	5	(Poland) Ruch Chorzów	6	0	474	0	1	0
7	MD	Ryszard Szymczak	Dec 14, 1944	27	0	(Poland) Gwardia Warsaw	2	0	22	0	2	0
8	MD	Zygfryd Szołtysik	Oct 24, 1942	29	41	(Poland) Górnik Zabrze	5	1	308	2	2	(yellow card) 1
9	MD	Kazimierz Deyna	Oct 23, 1947	24	26	(Poland) Legia Warsaw	7	9	616	1	0	0
10	FW	Włodzimierz Lubański	Feb 28, 1947	25	51	(Poland) Górnik Zabrze	7	2	630	0	0	0
11	FW	Robert Gadocha	Jan 10, 1946	26	22	(Poland) Legia Warsaw	7	6	630	0	0	0
12	FW	Kazimierz Kmiecik	Sep 19, 1951	20	0	(Poland) Wisła Kraków	3	1	225	1	0	0
13	DF	Jerzy Kraska	Dec 24, 1951	20	2	(Poland) Gwardia Warsaw	6	0	376	1	2	0
14	DF	Marian Ostafiński	Dec 8, 1946	25	3	(Poland) Ruch Chorzów	3	0	262	1	0	0
15	FW	Grzegorz Lato	Apr 8, 1950	22	2	(Poland) Stal Mielec	1	0	45	0	1	0
16	FW	Joachim Marx	Aug 31, 1944	27	14	(Poland) Ruch Chorzów	2	0	90	1	1	0
17	MD	Andrzej Jarosik	Nov 26, 1944	27	25	(Poland) Zagłębie Sosnowiec	0	0	0	0	0	0
18	GK	Marian Szeja	Aug 20, 1941	30	8	(Poland) Zagłębie Wałbrzych	0	0	0	0	0	0
19	DF	Zbigniew Gut	Apr 17, 1949	23	0	(Poland) Odra Opole	4	0	269	1	1	0

== Sudan ==
Head coach: Abdel-Fatah Hamad

No.	Pos.	Player	DoB	Age	Caps	Club	Tournament games	Tournament goals	Minutes played	Sub off	Sub on	Cards yellow/red
1	GK	Alnour Abdelgader			?	(Sudan) Al-Merrikh SC	0	0	0	0	0	0
2	DF	Alser Kaounda	1949	23	?	(Sudan) Al Merreikh	2	0	172	1	0	0
3	DF	Awad Koka	1947		?	(Sudan) Al Hilal	0	0	0	0	0	0
4	DF	Mahmoud James	1947		?	(Sudan) Al Tahrir	3	0	270	0	0	(yellow card) 1
5	DF	Abdelgader Murjan			?	(Sudan) Al Merreikh	0	0	0	0	0	0
6	DF	Najmeldin Hassan (C)	1945		?	(Sudan) Al Neel SC (Khartoum)	3	0	270	0	0	0
7	FW	Muhamed Albashir Al-Esaid			?	(Sudan) Al-Nil SC (Wad Madani)	1	0	50	1	0	0
8	MD	Bushara Abdel-Nadief	1947		?	(Sudan) Al Merreikh	3	0	270	0	0	0
9	MD	Bushra Wahba	Jan 1, 1943	28	?	(Sudan) Al Merreikh	3	0	242	1	0	0
10	FW	Nasreldin Jaksa	Aug 13, 1944	27	?	(Sudan) Al Hilal	3	1	270	0	0	(yellow card) 1
11	FW	Hasabu El-Sagheer	July 1, 1947	24	?	(Sudan) Burri	1	0	90	0	0	0
12	FW	Ezzeldin Al-Aati			?	(Sudan) Al-Mourada SC	0	0	0	0	0	0
13	FW	Alfadel Santo			?	(Sudan) Al Merreikh	0	0	0	0	0	0
14	FW	Muhsen Ataa	1948	24	?	(Sudan) Al-Merrikh SC	3	0	270	0	0	0
15	DF	Jaafar Nuba	1947	25	?	(Sudan) Al Ittihad	3	0	270	0	0	0
16	MD	Ezzeldin Al-Dehish	1949	23	?	(Sudan) Al Hilal	3	0	126	0	2	(yellow card) 1
17	MD	Sharafeldin Ahmed Musa	1938	34	?	(Sudan) Al Neel SC (Khartoum)	2	0	180	0	0	0
18	FW	Abdu Mustafa	1946	26	?	(Sudan) Al Hilal	3	0	220	0	1	0
19	GK	Muhamed Abdelfatah Zughbir	1949	23	?	(Sudan) Al Hilal	3	0	270	0	0	0

== United States ==
Head coach: Bob Guelker

No.	Pos.	Player	DoB	Age	Caps	Club	Tournament games	Tournament goals	Minutes played	Sub off	Sub on	Cards yellow/red
1	GK	Mike Ivanow	Jan 9, 1948	24	0	(United States) University of San Francisco	2	0	180	0	0	0
2	DF	Casey Bahr	Sept 20, 1948	23	0	United States Navy	3	0	270	0	0	0
3	DF	John Bocwinski	Nov 22, 1936	35	0	(United States) Polonia SC	2	0	180	0	0	0
4	MD	Al Trost	Feb 7, 1949	23	0	(United States) St Louis University	2	0	97	0	1	0
5	DF	Horst Stemke	Mar 5, 1942	30	0	(United States) University of Wisconsin	3	0	270	0	0	(yellow card) 1
6	MD	Neil Stam	Jan 7, 1942	30	0	(United States) German-American F.C.	3	0	270	0	0	0
7	FW	Archie Roboostoff	Oct 9, 1951	21	0	(United States) Condordia A.C.	3	0	270	0	0	0
8	FW	Mike Seerey	Oct 23, 1950	22	0	(United States) St Louis University	2	0	180	0	0	0
9	MD	John Carenza	Jan 30, 1950	22	0	(United States) Southern Illinois University	2	0	173	1	0	0
10	DF	Art Demling	Sept 21, 1948	23	0	(United States) Michigan State University	3	0	247	2	0	(yellow card) 1
11	FW	Mani Hernandez	Aug 2, 1948	24	0	(United States) Grenadiers S.C.	2	0	180	0	0	0
12	FW	Steve Gay	Sept 1, 1957	25	0	(United States) UCLA	2	0	78	1	1	0
13	FW	Hugo Salcedo	Jan 25, 1946	26	0	(United States) Compton S.C.	2	0	180	0	0	0
14	MD	Joe Hamm	Nov 1, 1950	21	0	(United States) St Louis University	2	0	106	0	1	0
15	DF	Wally Ziaja	July 2, 1949	23	0	(United States) Bavarian Blue Ribbons	1	0	90	0	0	0
16	FW	Mike Flater	Jan 22, 1951	21	0	(United States) Colorado School of Mines	1	0	62	1	0	0
17	MD	Jim Zylker	Jan 11, 1951	21	0	(United States) San Jose State University	1	0	19	0	1	0
18	FW	Mike Margulis	Aug 30, 1950	21	0		1	0	68	0	1	0
19	GK	Shep Messing	Oct 9, 1949	22	0	(United States) Harvard University	1	0	90	0	0	0

== Soviet Union ==
Head coach: Aleksandr Ponomarev

No.	Pos.	Player	DoB	Age	Caps	Club	Tournament games	Tournament goals	Minutes played	Sub off	Sub on	Cards yellow/red
1	GK	Yevhen Rudakov	Jan 2, 1942	30	26	(Soviet Union) Dynamo Kiev	6	0	554	1	0	0
2	DF	Yuriy Istomin	Jul 3, 1944	27	28	(Soviet Union) CSKA Moscow	6	0	448	1	1	0
3	DF	Murtaz Khurtsilava	Jan 5, 1943	29	55	(Soviet Union) Dynamo Tbilisi	6	1	516	0	1	(yellow card) 1
4	DF	Evgeny Lovchev	Jan 29, 1949	23	20	(Soviet Union) Spartak Moscow	6	0	525	0	1	0
5	DF	Volodymyr Kaplychnyi	Feb 26, 1944	28	41	(Soviet Union) CSKA Moscow	7	0	615	1	0	(yellow card) 1
6	MD	Viktor Kolotov	Jul 3, 1949	23	17	(Soviet Union) Dynamo Kiev	6	3	570	0	0	(yellow card) 1
7	FW	Volodymyr Onyshchenko	Oct 28, 1949	22	7	(Soviet Union) Zarya Voroshilovgrad	3	0	139	2	1	0
8	FW	Vyacheslav Semyonov	Aug 17, 1947	24	4	(Soviet Union) Zarya Voroshilovgrad	5	3	361	4	0	0
9	MD	Andrei Yakubik	Aug 24, 1950	21	0	(Soviet Union) FC Dynamo Moscow	2	0	169	0	1	0
10	MD	Anatoliy Kuksov	Nov 21, 1949	22	3	(Soviet Union) Zarya Voroshilovgrad	5	0	363	0	1	0
11	FW	Gennady Yevriuzhikin	Feb 4, 1944	28	27	(Soviet Union) FC Dynamo Moscow	6	1	491	1	0	0
12	DF	Revaz Dzodzuashvili	Apr 15, 1945	27	32	(Soviet Union) Dynamo Tbilisi	4	0	347	1	0	(yellow card) 1
13	DF	Sergei Olshansky	May 28, 1948	24	1	(Soviet Union) Spartak Moscow	3	0	181	0	2	0
14	FW	Oganes Zanazanyan	Dec 10, 1946	25	0	(Soviet Union) Ararat Yerevan	6	1	479	1	1	0
15	MD	Arkady Andriasyan	Aug 11, 1947	24	1	(Soviet Union) Ararat Yerevan	4	0	267	1	2	(yellow card) 1
16	MD	Yozhef Sabo	Feb 29, 1940	32	35	(Soviet Union) FC Dynamo Moscow	5	1	450	0	0	0
17	GK	Vladimir Pilguy	Jan 26, 1948	24	1	(Soviet Union) FC Dynamo Moscow	2	0	106	0	0	0
18	FW	Yuriy Yeliseyev	Sep 26, 1949	22	4	(Soviet Union) Zarya Voroshilovgrad	3	1	208	0	1	0
19	FW	Oleh Blokhin	Nov 5, 1952	21	2	(Soviet Union) Dynamo Kiev	6	6	486	1	1	0

== West Germany ==
Head coach: Jupp Derwall

No.	Pos.	Player	DoB	Age	Caps	Club	Tournament games	Tournament goals	Minutes played	Sub off	Sub on	Cards yellow/red
1	GK	Günther Wienhold	Jan 21, 1948	24	0	(West Germany) Eintracht Frankfurt	5	0	450	0	0	0
2	DF	Heiner Baltes	Sep 19, 1949	22	0	(West Germany) Fortuna Düsseldorf	6	0	517	1	0	(yellow card) 1
3	DF	Reiner Hollmann	Sep 30, 1949	22	0	(West Germany) Rot-Weiß Oberhausen	3	0	225	1	0	0
4	DF	Egon Schmitt	Nov 12, 1948	23	0	(West Germany) Kickers Offenbach	6	0	540	0	0	0
5	DF	Friedhelm Haebermann	Jul 24, 1946	26	0	(West Germany) Eintracht Braunschweig	6	0	540	0	0	0
6	DF	Hartwig Bleidick	Dec 26, 1944	27	2	(West Germany) Borussia Mönchengladbach	3	0	270	0	0	0
7	MD	Hermann Bitz	Sep 21, 1950	21	0	(West Germany) Kaiserslautern	6	1	527	1	0	(yellow card) 1
8	MD	Rudolf Seliger	Sep 20, 1951	20	0	(West Germany) MSV Duisburg	6	2	291	2	3	0
9	FW	Klaus Wunder	Sep 13, 1950	21	0	(West Germany) MSV Duisburg	2	0	123	2	0	0
10	FW	Uli Hoeneß	Jan 5, 1952	20	2	(West Germany) Bayern München	5	1	450	0	0	0
11	FW	Ronnie Worm	Oct 7, 1953	18	0	(West Germany) MSV Duisburg	6	1	296	2	3	0
12	DF	Dieter Mietz	Sep 3, 1943	28	0	(West Germany) Borussia Dortmund	1	0	23	0	1	0
13	MD	Bernd Nickel	Mar 15, 1949	23	0	(West Germany) Eintracht Frankfurt	6	6	540	0	0	(yellow card) 1
14	DF	Manfred Kaltz	Jan 6, 1953	19	0	(West Germany) Hamburg	1	0	13	0	1	0
15	DF	Hans-Dieter Seelmann	Sep 18, 1952	19	0	(West Germany) 1860 München	0	0	0	0	0	0
16	MD	Jürgen Kalb	May 20, 1948	24	0	(West Germany) Eintracht Frankfurt	6	1	470	1	1	0
17	FW	Ottmar Hitzfeld	Jan 12, 1949	23	0	(Switzerland) FC Basel	6	5	462	0	1	0
18	FW	Ewald Hammes	Aug 4, 1950	21	0	(West Germany) SG Wattenscheid 09	2	0	83	1	1	0
19	GK	Hans-Jürgen Bradler	Sep 12, 1948	23	0	(West Germany) VfL Bochum	1	0	90	0	0	0
