= Mexico at the 1972 Summer Olympics =

- IOC code: MEX
- NOC: Mexican Olympic Committee

in Munich
- Competitors: 174 (152 men and 22 women) in 20 sports
- Flag bearer: Felipe Muñoz
- Medals Ranked 33rd: Gold 0 Silver 1 Bronze 0 Total 1

Summer Olympics appearances (overview)
- 1900; 1904–1920; 1924; 1928; 1932; 1936; 1948; 1952; 1956; 1960; 1964; 1968; 1972; 1976; 1980; 1984; 1988; 1992; 1996; 2000; 2004; 2008; 2012; 2016; 2020; 2024

Mexico, the previous host of the 1968 Summer Olympics in Mexico City, competed at the 1972 Summer Olympics in Munich, West Germany. 174 competitors, 152 men and 22 women, took part in 112 events in 20 sports.

== Medalists ==
=== Silver ===
- Alfonso Zamora — Boxing, Men's Bantamweight

== Archery ==
In the first modern archery competition at the Olympics, Mexico entered three men and three women. The women were much more successful than the men, though none of the archers won a medal. Their highest placing competitor was Francisca de Gutierrez, at 10th place in the women's competition.

Women's Individual Competition:

- Francisca de Gutierrez – 2353 points (→ 10th place)
- Aurora Bretón – 2335 points (→ 15th place)
- Silvia de Tapia – 2258 points (→ 23rd place)

Men's Individual Competition:

- Alfonso Jones – 2344 points (→ 28th place)
- Rafael Aveleira – 2178 points (→ 51st place)
- José Almanzor – 2175 points (→ 52nd place)

== Athletics ==
Men's 5,000 metres

- Mario Pérez

- Heat — 13:58.2 (→ did not advance)

- Pedro Miranda

- Heat — 13:45.2 (→ did not advance)

Men's 10,000 metres

- Juan Máximo Martínez
- Pedro Miranda

Men's Marathon

- Jacinto Sabinal
- Alfredo Peñaloza
- Rafael Tadeo

Men's 20 km Walk

- José Oliveros
- Pedro Aroche
- Ismael Avila

Men's 50 km Walk

- Gabriel Hernández
- Raúl González
- José Oliveros

== Boxing ==
Men's Light Flyweight (– 48 kg)

- Salvador García

- First Round — Lost to Ralph Evans (GBR), 1:4

Men's Flyweight (– 51 kg)

- Arturo Delgado

Men's Bantamweight

- Alfonso Zamora

Men's Featherweight

- Juan Francisco García

Men's Lightweight

- Antonio Gin

Men's Welterweight

- Sergio Lozano

Men's Light Middleweight (– 71 kg)

- Emeterio Villanueva

- First Round — Bye
- Second Round — Defeated Alfredo Lemus (VEN), 4:1
- Third Round — Defeated Christopher Elliott (IRL), TKO-3
- Quarterfinals — Lost to Peter Tiepold (GDR), 0:5

Men's Middleweight

- José Luis Espinosa

== Cycling ==
Six cyclists represented Mexico in 1972.

Individual road race

- Jesús Sarabia — 10th place
- Agustín Alcántara — did not finish (→ no ranking)
- Francisco Vázquez — did not finish (→ no ranking)
- Francisco Javier Huerta — did not finish (→ no ranking)

Team time trial

- Agustín Alcántara
- Antonio Hernández
- Francisco Huerta
- Francisco Vázquez

Sprint

- Arturo Cambroni

1000m time trial

- Arturo Cambroni

- Final — 1:11.54 (→ 24th place)

Individual pursuit

- Francisco Huerta

== Diving ==
Men's 3m Springboard

- Carlos Armando Giron – 521.88 points (→ 9th place)
- José de Jesus Robinson – 514.02 points (→ 11th place)
- Porfirio Becerril – 310.65 points (→ 27th place)

Men's 10m Platform

- Carlos Armando Giron – 442.41 points (→ 8th place)
- José de Jesus Robinson – 284.58 points (→ 14th place)
- Porfirio Becerril – 282.57 points (→ 15th place)

Women's 3m Springboard

- Bertha Baraldi – 252.66 points (→ 15th place)

Women's 10m Platform

- Bertha Baraldi – 174.21 points (→ 20th place)

== Fencing ==
Six fencers, all men, represented Mexico in 1972.

Men's foil

- Carlos Calderón
- Vicente Calderón

Men's épée

- Luis Stephens
- Jorge Castillejos
- Carlos Calderón

Men's team épée

- Carlos Calderón, Jorge Castillejos, Hermilo Leal, Luis Stephens

Men's sabre

- Roberto Alva
- Vicente Calderón
- Hermilo Leal

== Football ==
Men's Team Competition

- Preliminary Round (Group 2)

- Defeated Sudan (1-0)
- Defeated Burma (1-0)
- Lost to Soviet Union (1-4)

- Second Round (Group A)

- Drew with West Germany (1-1)
- Lost to East Germany (0-7)
- Lost to Hungary (0-2)
  - Did not advance → Seventh place

- Team Roster

- Juan Manuel Álvarez
- Francisco Barba Ordaz
- Fernando Blanco Garell
- Manuel Borja Garcia
- Leonardo Cuellar Rivera
- Alejandro Hernandez Pat
- Alfredo Hernandez Martinez
- Manuel Manzo
- Salvador Marquez Ramos
- Enrique Martin del Campo
- Alejandro Peña
- Daniel Razo Marquez
- David Regalado
- Lorenzo Reyes
- Jesus Rico Espejel
- Rogelio Ruiz Vaquera
- Horacio Sánchez Marquez
- José Angel Talavera
- José Luis Trejo Montoya

== Hockey ==
Men's Team Competition

- Preliminary Round (Group B)

- Lost to Great Britain (0-6)
- Lost to New Zealand (0-7)
- Lost to Poland (0-3)
- Lost to Australia (0-10)
- Lost to the Netherlands (0-4)
- Lost to India (0-8)
- Lost to Kenya (1-2)

- Classification Match

- 15th/16th place: Lost to Uganda (1-4) → 16th place

- Team Roster

- Adán Noriega
- David Sevilla
- José Luis Partida
- Enrique Filoteo
- Francisco Ramírez
- Héctor Ventura
- Javier Varela
- José Miguel Huacuja
- José María Mascaro
- Juan Calderón
- Manuel Fernández
- Manuel Noriega
- Noel Gutiérrez
- Orlando Ventura
- Oscar Huacuja
- Rubén Vasconcelos
- Víctor Contreras

== Judo ==
- Raul Furlon
- Luis Arredondo
- Epigmenio Etchiga

== Modern pentathlon ==
Three male pentathletes represented Mexico in 1972.

Men's Individual Competition:

- Gilberto Toledano – 4428 points (→ 42nd place)
- Eduarde Olivera Lastra – 4426 points (→ 43rd place)
- Juan José Castilla – 4014 points (→ 55th place)

Men's Team Competition:

- Toledano Sanchez, Olivera Lastra, and Castilla Ramos – 12901 points (→ 17th place)

Alternate Member:

- Rafael Alvarez Perez

== Rowing ==
Men's Single Sculls

- Guillermo Spamer

- Heat — 8:38.63
- Repechage — 8:40.76 (→ did not advance)

== Shooting ==
Ten shooters, nine men and one woman, represented Mexico in 1972.

25 m pistol

- Homero Laddaga
- Mario Sánchez

50 m pistol

- Juventino Sánchez

300 m rifle, three positions

- Olegario Vázquez
- Jesús Elizondo

50 m rifle, three positions

- Olegario Vázquez
- Jesús Elizondo

50 m rifle, prone

- Ernesto Montemayor, Jr.
- Olegario Vázquez

Trap

- Fernando Walls
- David Alkon

Skeet

- Nuria Ortíz
- Juan Bueno

== Swimming ==
Men's 100m Freestyle

- Roberto Strauss

- Heat — 56.78s (→ did not advance)

Men's 200m Freestyle

- Guillermo García

- Heat — DNS (→ did not advance)

- Roberto Strauss

- Heat — 2:03.57 (→ did not advance)

Men's 400m Freestyle

- Guillermo García
- José Luis Prado

Men's 1500m Freestyle

- Guillermo García
- Alberto García

Men's 100m Backstroke

- José Joaquín Santibáñez

Men's 200m Backstroke

- Rafael Rocha
- José Urueta

Men's 100m Breaststroke

- Felipe Muñoz
- Gustavo Salcedo

Men's 200m Breaststroke

- Felipe Muñoz
- Gustavo Salcedo

Men's 100m Butterfly

- Hugo Valencia

Men's 200m Butterfly

- Hugo Valencia
- Ricardo Marmolejo

Men's 200m Individual Medley

- Ricardo Marmolejo
- José Joaquín Santibáñez

Men's 400m Individual Medley

- Ricardo Marmolejo
- José Luis Prado

Men's 4 × 100 m Freestyle Relay

- Jorge Urreta, José Santibañez, Guillermo García and Roberto Strauss

- Heat — DNF (→ did not advance)

Men's 4 × 200 m Freestyle Relay

- Guillermo García, Roberto Strauss, José Luis Prado, and Jorge Urreta

- Heat — 8:08.39 (→ did not advance)

Men's 4 × 100 m Medley Relay

Women's 100m Freestyle

Women's 200m Freestyle

Women's 400m Freestyle

Women's 800m Freestyle

Women's 100m Backstroke

Women's 200m Backstroke

Women's 100m Breaststroke

Women's 200m Breaststroke

Women's 100m Butterfly

Women's 200m Butterfly

Women's 200m Individual Medley

Women's 400m Individual Medley

Women's 4 × 100 m Freestyle Relay

Women's 4 × 100 m Medley Relay

== Water polo ==
Men's Team Competition

- Preliminary Round (Group A)

- Lost to Cuba (4-6)
- Defeated Canada (7-3)
- Lost to Yugoslavia (3-5)
- Lost to United States (5-7)
- Lost to Romania (6-9) → Did not advance

- Team Roster

- Daniel Goméz Bilbao
- Arturo Valencia Cadena
- Alfredo Sauza Martinéz
- Francisco Garcia Moreno
- Juan Manuel Garcia Moreno
- Raul Alanis Guerrero
- Maximiliano Aguilar Salazar
- Armando Fernandez Alatorre
- Ricardo Chapa Galaviz
- Rafael Azpeitia Lopez
- Victor Manuel Garcia Romero

== See also ==
- Mexico at the 1971 Pan American Games
