= Alejandro Hernández =

Alejandro Hernández may refer to:

- Alejandro Hernández (boxer) (born 1986), Mexican boxer
- Alejandro Hernández (director) (born 1990), Venezuelan filmmaker
- Alejandro Hernández (footballer) (born 1948), Mexican footballer
- Alejandro Hernández (screenwriter) (born 1970), Cuban screenwriter based in Spain
- Alejandro Hernández (tennis) (born 1977), Mexican tennis player
- Alejandro Hernández Hernández (born 1982), Spanish football referee
- Alejandro Hernandez, sentenced to death and later exonerated; see Jeanine Nicarico murder case
- Alejandro Hernandez (ice hockey) (born 1991) Spanish ice hockey player for CD Hielo Bipolo
- Alejandro Cruz Hernández (born 1986), Spanish footballer
- Alejandro Martínez Hernández (born 1962), Mexican politician

== See also ==
- Alejandro Fernández, Mexican singer
