= Stamm =

Stamm is a German surname; it may refer to:

- Barbara Stamm (1944–2022), German politician
- Cäcilia Cordula Stamm, birth name of Cäcilia Weber (1727–1793), mother of Constanze Weber, the wife of Wolfgang Amadeus Mozart
- Christin-Marie Stamm (born 1991), German politician
- Feliks Stamm (1901–1976), Polish boxing coach
- Hagen Stamm (born 1960), German water polo player
- John S. Stamm (1878–1956), American bishop of the Evangelical Church
- Marvin Stamm (born 1939), American bebop trumpeter
- Michael Stamm (born 1952), American backstroke swimmer
- Peter Stamm (born 1963), Swiss writer
- Robert Stamm (1900–1937), German politician
- Robert Hutzen Stamm (1877–1934), Danish zoologist
- Wilhelm von Stamm (died 1905), Latvian chess master

== See also ==
- Stam (surname)
