= Abdullah Othman =

Abdullah Othman can refer to:

- Abdullah Othman (Malaysian footballer) (born 1945), Malaysian footballer
- Abdullah Othman (Saudi footballer) (born 1990), Saudi footballer
