= Alberto García =

Alberto García may refer to:

- Alberto García (swimmer) (born 1957), Mexican former swimmer
- Alberto García Aspe (born 1967), Mexican football midfielder
- Alberto García (runner) (born 1971), Spanish long-distance and cross-country runner
- Alberto García (Spanish footballer) (born 1985), Spanish football goalkeeper
- Alberto García (footballer, born 1993), Mexican football forward
