= Stam =

STAM can refer to:

- Ghent City Museum (in Dutch: Stadsmuseum Gent)
- Signal transducing adaptor molecule, a human gene
- Science and Technology of Advanced Materials, an open access journal in materials science
- Sparse totally anti-magic square, a type of Antimagic square
- UGM-89 Perseus, a cancelled U.S. Navy submarine-launched anti-ship and anti-submarine guided missile system known as Submarine TActical Missile
- Surface-to-air missile, otherwise spelt as Surface To Air Missile

Stam can refer to:

- Stam (surname)
- Ktav Stam, Jewish traditional writing
- Sofer stam, a scribe of Jewish religious books
- Stam (film), a 2020 South African Afrikaans-language thriller film
