= 2008–09 in Uruguayan football =

Football in Uruguay
- Season: 2008–09

== Primera División ==
- Champion: Nacional (42nd title)
- Top scorer: Joaquín Boghossian (16 goals)
- International qualifiers:
  - Copa Libertadores:
    - Group Stage: Nacional and Cerro
    - Preliminary Round: Racing
  - Copa Sudamericana:
    - First Stage: River Plate and Liverpool
- Widest winning margin: Tacuarembó 0-5 Cerro (February 28, 2009)
- Highest scoring: Bella Vista 5−2 Cerro Largo (November 9, 2008)
- Most wins: Defensor Sporting and Nacional (21)
- Fewest wins: Rampla Juniors and Villa Española (3)
- Most draws: Liverpool and Racing (12)
- Fewest draws: Villa Española (3)
- Most losses: Juventud (21)
- Fewest losses: Racing (6)
- Most goals scored: Nacional (68)
- Fewest goals scored: Villa Española (11)
- Most goals conceded: Rampla Juniors and Juventud (60)
- Fewest goals conceded: Villa Española (26)
- Best goal difference: Cerro (+31)
- Worst goal difference: Juventud (-36)
- Relegated: Villa Española, Bella Vista, Juventud

== International tournaments ==
Team \ Competition	Copa Sudamericana 2008	Copa Libertadores 2009
River Plate	Preliminary round eliminated by (Chile) Universidad Católica	N/A
Defensor Sporting	Round of 16 eliminated by (Argentina) River Plate	Quarterfinals eliminated by (Argentina) Estudiantes de La Plata
Nacional	N/A	Semifinals eliminated by (Argentina) Estudiantes de La Plata
Peñarol	N/A	Preliminary round eliminated by (Colombia) Independiente Medellín

== Second Division ==
=== Teams ===
These are the teams that currently participate in Uruguayan Second Division:

- Atenas
- Basañez (withdraw)
- Boston River
- Cerrito
- Deportivo Maldonado
- Durazno FC
- El Tanque Sisley
- Fénix
- Huracán Buceo

- Miramar Misiones
- La Luz Tacurú FC (withdraw)
- Plaza Colonia
- Progreso
- Rentistas
- Rocha FC
- IASA

=== Teams promoted to 2009/2010 First Division ===
- Fénix (Apertura champion)
- Cerrito (Clausura champion)
- Atenas (won promotion playoff against Durazno)

== Uruguay national teams ==
This section will cover Uruguay's games from August 1, 2008 until June 30, 2009.

=== Uruguay ===
==== Friendly matches ====
20 August 2008	Japan	1 – 3	Uruguay	Sapporo Dome, Sapporo, Japan
19:10 (JST)	Eguren 55' (o.g.)	Report	Eguren 48'; I. González 83'; Abreu 90'	Attendance: 50,000; Referee: Marcin Borski (Poland)

19 November 2009	France	0 – 0	Uruguay	Stade de France, Saint-Denis, France
21:00 (UTC+1)		Report	Cáceres (yellow card) 40'; Á. Pereira (yellow card) 57'; Sánchez (yellow card) 90'	Attendance: 80,000; Referee: Cyril Zimmermann (Switzerland)

11 February 2009	Libya	2 – 3	Uruguay	June 11 Stadium, Tripoli, Libya
16:30 (UTC+2)	Esnany 31' al Fazzani 57'	Report	Eguren 13'; Martínez 70'; Á. Pereira 74'	Attendance: 50,000; Referee: Muhammad al Jilali (Libya)

=== 2010 World Cup qualifiers ===
6 September 2008 Round 7	Colombia	0 – 1	Uruguay	Estadio El Campín, Bogotá, Colombia
18:20 (UTC-5)		Report	Eguren 15'; Fucile (yellow card) 27'; Castillo (yellow card) 75'; Rodríguez (yellow card) 90+2'	Attendance: 35,024; Referee: Leonardo Gaciba (Brazil)

10 September 2008 Round 8	Uruguay	0 – 0	Ecuador	Estadio Centenario, Montevideo, Uruguay
17:40 (UTC-3)	Eguren (yellow card) 7'	Report	Méndez (yellow card) 6'; Valencia (yellow card) 68'; Mina (yellow card) 74'; Cevallos (yellow card) 82'	Attendance: 45,000; Referee: Óscar Ruiz (Colombia)

11 October 2008 Round 9	Argentina	2 – 1	Uruguay	Estadio Antonio V. Liberti, Buenos Aires, Argentina
17:10 (UTC-3)	Messi 5', (yellow card) 83'; Agüero 12'; Riquelme (yellow card) 48'; Tevez (yellow card) 53'; Heinze (yellow card) 60'; Mascherano (yellow card) 64'	Report	Eguren (yellow card) 27'; Godín (yellow card) 32'; Lugano 39'; Suárez (yellow card) 50'; Bueno (yellow card) 77'; Pérez (yellow card) 85'	Attendance: 42,421; Referee: Carlos Torres (Paraguay)

14 October 2008 Round 10	Bolivia	2 – 2	Uruguay	Estadio Hernando Siles, La Paz, Bolivia
16:00 (UTC-4)	Moreno 15', 41'; Vargas (yellow card) 66'	Report	Scotti (yellow card) 8'; Silva (yellow card) 23'; Bueno 64'; Arismendi (yellow card) 73'; Abreu 88'	Attendance: 21,075; Referee: Héctor Baldassi (Argentina)

28 March 2009 Round 11	Uruguay	2 – 0	Paraguay	Estadio Centenario, Montevideo, Uruguay
17:00 (UTC-3)	Forlán 28'; Lugano 57'; Á. Pereira (yellow card) 84'	Report	Estigarribia (yellow card) 16'; Cáceres (yellow card) 65'; Barreto (yellow card) 67'	Attendance: 45,000; Referee: Carlos Simon (Brazil)

1 April 2009 Round 12	Chile	0 – 0	Uruguay	Estadio Nacional, Santiago, Chile
19:10 (UTC-4)	Isla (yellow card) 22' (yellow-red card) 33'	Report	Pérez (yellow card) 17'; Lugano (yellow card) 39'; Eguren (yellow card) 42'; Forlán (yellow card) 65'; Cáceres (yellow card) 80'; Rodríguez (yellow card) 85'	Attendance: 55,000; Referee: Héctor Baldassi (Argentina)

6 June 2009 Round 13	Uruguay	0 – 4	Brazil	Estadio Centenario, Montevideo, Uruguay
16:00 (UTC-3)	Valdez (yellow card) 58'; M. Pereira (red card) 86'; Eguren (yellow card) 90+2'	Report	Alves 12'; Luís Fabiano (yellow card) 21' (yellow-red card) 65', (goal) 52'; Juan 36'; Kaká 75' (pen.)	Attendance: 52,000; Referee: Saul Laverni (Argentina)

10 June 2009 Round 14	Venezuela	2 – 2	Uruguay	Polideportivo Cachamay, Puerto Ordaz, Venezuela
20:30 (UTC-4:30)	Maldonado 9'; Rey 74'; Peña (yellow card) 82'	Report	Suárez 60'; Cáceres (yellow card) 70'; Forlán 72', (yellow card) 90+2'; Lugano (yellow card) 72'; Cavani (yellow card) 73'; Pérez (yellow card) 90+1'	Attendance: 37,000; Referee: Salvio Fagundes (Brazil)

=== Uruguay U-20 ===
==== World Cup qualifiers ====
The Uruguay under-20 squad is in Group B of the qualification process for the Final Group of 2009 South American Youth Championship.

===== First Group stage =====
20 January 2009
18:00 (UTC-4:30)

Bolivia	0 – 2	Uruguay
Sánchez (yellow card) 80'; Verduguez (yellow card) 82'	Report	Lodeiro 53', 90'; D. Rodríguez (yellow card) 59'; Gunino (yellow card) 75'; Charquero (yellow card) 84'

Polideportivo Cachamay, Puerto Ordaz, Venezuela
Attendance: 7,000
Referee: Juan Ernesto Soto (Venezuela)

22 January 2009
18:00 (UTC-4:30)

Uruguay	3 – 2	Chile
Viudez 1'; Peña 41'; García 70'; Cabrera (yellow card) 80'; Lodeiro (yellow card) 80'	Report	Aránguiz 5'; Sagredo 9' (pen.); Labrin (yellow card) 30'

Polideportivo Cachamay, Puerto Ordaz, Venezuela
Attendance: 3,000
Referee: Wilmar Roldán (Colombia)

24 January 2009
18:00 (UTC-4:30)

Paraguay	2 – 4	Uruguay
Ramírez 21'; J. Cabrera (yellow card) 24'; Pérez (yellow card) 53'; Burgos (yellow card) 70'; Santander 90+2'	Report	L. Cabrera 52'; García 54'; Calzada (yellow card) 63'; Lodeiro 77'; Urretavizcaya 79'

Polideportivo Cachamay, Puerto Ordaz, Venezuela
Attendance: 5,000
Referee: Saul Laverni (Argentina)

28 January 2009
20:00 (UTC-4:30)

Uruguay	3 – 2	Brazil
Cordoba 22'; Hernández 69', 85'; Coates (yellow card) 78'; Aguirregaray (yellow card) 80'; Charquero (yellow card) 90'	Report	Douglas Costa 33'; Alan Kardec 64', (yellow card) 76'; Maylson (yellow card) 81'

Polideportivo Cachamay, Puerto Ordaz, Venezuela
Attendance: 9,000
Referee: Carlos Vera (Ecuador)

===== Final group =====
31 January 2009
18:15 (UTC-4:30)

Uruguay	2 – 3	Brazil
Cabrera (yellow card) 37'; Silva 40'; Herrera (yellow card) 44'; Pereyra (yellow card) 88'; Hernández 90+5'	Report	Dentinho (yellow card) 1'; Walter 20', 31'; Douglas Costa 78'

Polideportivo Cachamay, Puerto Ordaz, Venezuela
Attendance: 8,000
Referee: Enrique Osses (Chile)

2 February 2009
18:15 (UTC-4:30)

Uruguay	2 – 1	Colombia
Aguirregaray (yellow card) 25', (goal) 58'; Peña (yellow card) 28'; Urretavizcaya (yellow card) 57'; Charquero 78'	Report	Pertuz 9'; Cárdenas (yellow card) 59'; Cuesta (yellow card) 87'

Estadio Monumental de Maturín, Maturín, Venezuela
Attendance: 3,000
Referee: Salvio Fagundes (Brazil)

4 February 2009
18:15 (UTC-4:30)

Argentina	1 – 2	Uruguay
Gaitán (yellow card) 34' (yellow-red card) 54'; Salvio 85'	Report	Aguirregaray (yellow card) 36'; Urretavizcaya 71'; Hernández 77' (yellow card) 80'

Estadio José Antonio Anzoátegui, Puerto La Cruz, Venezuela
Attendance: 5,000
Referee: Carlos Vera (Ecuador)

6 February 2009
18:15 (UTC-4:30)

Uruguay	2 – 2	Paraguay
Urretavizcaya 13'; Pereyra (yellow card) 66'; Coates (yellow card) 72'; García 74'; Silva (yellow card) 90+2'	Report	Paniagua 15', 33'; Huth (yellow card) 30'; Ramírez (red card) 90'

Estadio José Antonio Anzoátegui, Puerto La Cruz, Venezuela
Attendance: 5,000
Referee: Joaquín Antequera (Bolivia)

8 February 2009
18:15 (UTC-4:30)

Venezuela	3 – 1	Uruguay
Velasquez 14', (yellow card) 59'; Lezama (yellow card) 31'; Peña 54' (o.g.); Acosta 69'	Report	Peña (yellow card) 34'; García 45'; Aguirregaray (yellow card) 76'

Estadio José Antonio Anzoátegui, Puerto La Cruz, Venezuela
Attendance: 15,000
Referee: Salvio Fagundes (Brazil)

=== Uruguay U-17 ===
==== World Cup qualifiers ====
The Uruguay under-17 squad is in Group B of the qualification process for the Final Group of 2009 South American Under-17 Football Championship.

===== First Group stage =====
18 April 2009
22:00 (UTC-4)

Chile	1 – 3	Uruguay
Aravena (yellow card) 38'; Andia (yellow card) 49'; Navarrete (yellow card) 60'; González 83' (pen.)	Report	Arias (yellow card) 25'; Barreto 35' (pen.), 55'; Pereyra (yellow card) 52'; Gallegos 79'; Ichazo (yellow card) 84'; Sellares (yellow card) 85'

Estadio Tierra de Campeones, Iquique, Chile
Attendance: 10,000
Referee: Francisco Peñuela (Colombia)

24 April 2009
22:00 (UTC-4)

Venezuela	0 – 1	Uruguay
Maharaj (yellow card) 32'; Clavijo (yellow card) 85'	Report	Laureiro 23'; Pereyra (yellow card) 30'

Estadio Tierra de Campeones, Iquique, Chile
Attendance: 1,000
Referee: Víctor Hugo Carrillo (Peru)

27 April 2009
19:00 (UTC-4)

Uruguay	0 – 2	Argentina
Rodríguez (yellow card) 43'; Arias (yellow card) 64'; Avilés (yellow card) 78'	Report	Araujo 11'; Pereyra (yellow card) 14'; Marín (yellow card) 14'; González Pires (yellow card) 43'; Sosa (yellow card) 70' (yellow-red card) 72'; Villalba 90+1'

Estadio Tierra de Campeones, Iquique, Chile
Attendance: 1,000
Referee: Francisco Peñuela (Colombia)

27 April 2009
19:00 (UTC-4)

Uruguay	1 – 1	Ecuador
De los Santos 2'; Pereyra (yellow card) 24'	Report	De la Cruz 23' (pen.); Valencia (yellow card) 43'; Fuertes (yellow card) 45+2'

Estadio Tierra de Campeones, Iquique, Chile
Attendance: 1,000
Referee: Víctor Hugo Carrillo (Peru)

===== Final group =====
3 May 2009
19:00 (UTC-4)

Bolivia	1 – 1	Uruguay
Alvarez (yellow card) 15'; Toco (yellow card) 23'; Justiniano 90+1'	Report	Polenta (yellow card) 32'; Barreto 78'; Prieto (yellow card) 83'

Estadio Tierra de Campeones, Iquique, Chile
Attendance: 2,000
Referee: Giovanni Perluzzo (Venezuela)

6 May 2009
19:00 (UTC-4)

Colombia	0 – 2	Uruguay
Cardona (yellow card) 33'	Report	Gallegos 26'; Arias 68'

Estadio Tierra de Campeones, Iquique, Chile
Attendance: 1,000
Referee: Carlos Galeano (Paraguay)

9 May 2009
19:00 (UTC-4)

Ecuador	1 – 3	Uruguay
Fuertes (yellow card) 20'; Quiñonez (yellow card) 26'; Pineida (yellow card) 34'; Villaprado (yellow card) 41' (yellow-red card) 90+1'; Caicedo 79'; Villacís (yellow card) 86'	Report	Barreto 35' (pen.); Luna 53', 58'

Estadio Tierra de Campeones, Iquique, Chile
Attendance: 2,000
Referee: Diego Abal (Argentina)
