= Alejandro Martínez =

Alejandro Martínez may refer to:

- Alejandro Martínez Hernández (born 1962), Mexican politician
- Alejandro Martínez (actor) (born 1966), Colombian actor
- Alejandro Martínez (Argentine footballer) (born 1997), Argentine footballer
- Alejandro Martínez (Mexican footballer) (born 1990), Mexican footballer

== See also ==
- Alex Martinez (disambiguation)
- Alexandro Martínez Camberos (1916-1999), Mexican judge
