= Edward S. Shapiro =

American historian

Edward Stanford Shapiro (born 1938) is a historian of American history and American Jewish history. He received his BA at Georgetown University and his PhD at Harvard University. His doctoral dissertation was The American Distributists and the New Deal. Most of Shapiro's career was spent as professor of American history at Seton Hall University. He is the father of historian Marc B. Shapiro and cousin of equestrian Neal Shapiro.

Shapiro has been a resident of West Orange, New Jersey, since 1969.

== Books, articles, lectures ==
- Clio From the Right: Essays of a Conservative Historian, University Press of America, 1983
- A Time for Healing, American Jewry since World War II , Johns Hopkins Press, 1992 (There are 748 copies in WorldCat libraries)
- Letters of Sidney Hook Democracy, Communism, and the Cold War, M.E. Sharpe, 1995
- We Are Many: Reflections on American Jewish History and Identity, Syracuse University Press, 2005
- Crown Heights: Blacks, Jews, and the 1991 Brooklyn Riot, Brandeis University Press, 2006 (There are 343 copies in WorldCat libraries)
- Yiddish in America : Essays on Yiddish Culture in the Golden Land, University of Scranton Press, 2008
- A Unique People in a Unique Land: Essays on American Jewish History, Academic Studies Press, 2022
- Shapiro Academia page
- Shapiro book reviews for Jewish Book Council
- Shapiro speaking at Sidney Hook Symposium
