= Bahwandi Hiralal =

Malaysian footballer

Bahwandi a/l Hiralal (born 1 June 1951) is a former Malaysian football player. In 2004, he was inducted in Olympic Council of Malaysia's Hall of Fame for 1972 Summer Olympics football team.

== Career ==
A defender, Bahwandi played for Selangor FA in Malaysia Cup tournament in the late 60s and early 70s. He also played for the Malaysia national football team, and was in the team that qualified to the 1972 Munich Olympics football competition. In the finals, Bahwandi played one group games, against West Germany. Bahwandi also played in the 1970 Asian Games in Bangkok, as well as winning silver medal in the 1971 SEAP Games. In coaching, Bahwandi has coached the PDRM FA football team in the 1990s, and the Malaysia national futsal team from late 1990s to early 2000s. Later, he was the president of The Ex-State and Ex-National Footballers Association of Malaysia.

Bahwandi also played field hockey, and was captaining Malaysia youth team from 1969 to 1971. A police officer by profession, his last rank before retiring from Royal Malaysian Police was Deputy Superintendent. During his police career, he also known as one of the Magneficient 12 troop that busting Botak Chin, A well known Malaysian criminal and gangster.
