= Mitch Barnhart =

American college sports administrator (born 1959)

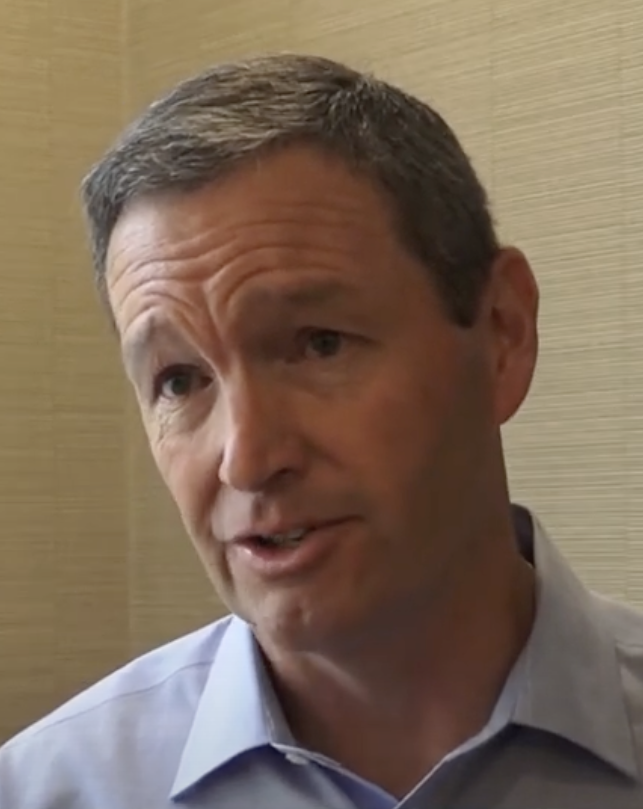
- Barnhart in 2018

Biographical details
- Born: August 27, 1959 (age 67); Kansas City, Kansas, U.S.
- Education: Ottawa University (BA); Ohio University (MS)

Mitch Barnhart (born August 27, 1959) is an American former college athletics administrator who last served as the athletic director for the University of Kentucky from 2002 until his retirement in 2026. He was hired by the university in 2002 succeeding Larry Ivy. Barnhart served in the same capacity at Oregon State University from 1998 to 2002. He is the university's tenth athletics director. In August 2023 Barnhart signed an extension on his contract which will keep him at Kentucky until 2028. On March 3, 2026, Barnhart announced that he would retire at the end of June.

== Education ==
Barnhart received his Bachelor of Arts from Ottawa University and a Master of Science in sports administration from Ohio University.

== Tenure at Kentucky ==
Barnhart was the longest serving AD in the SEC. For the 2016–17 school year, Kentucky athletics finished 10th nationally in the NACDA Directors' Cup, more than 100 student-athletes graduating, and finishing five straight years with an average GPA of over 3.0.

As of 2017, several coaches and administrators who have worked under Barnhart at Kentucky are now serving as athletic directors at other universities, including:

- Greg Byrne of Alabama
- Mark Coyle at Minnesota
- Rob Mullens at Oregon
- Scott Stricklin at Florida
- John Cohen at Auburn
- DeWayne Peevy at DePaul
- Kevin Saal at Wichita State

Barnhart was inducted into Omicron Delta Kappa - The National Leadership Honor Society at the University of Kentucky in 2017.

In April 2024, Barnhart would be named in a Title IX sexual violence lawsuit which accused him of complicity with former swim coach Lars Jorgensen, who was accused of being a sexual predator while he was a swim coach at the University of Kentucky between 2013 and 2023. Emails from June 2012 also revealed that Mark Howard, a former assistant swimming coach at the University of Toledo, informed both Barnhart and Gary Conelly, who at time served as University of Kentucky's head swim coach, that Jorgensen was accused of being involved in a sexual relationship with a female student he coached while employed at the University of Toledo.
