= Looi Loon Teik =

Malaysian footballer

Personal information
- Date of birth: 15 February 1945 (age 81)
- Place of birth: Kedah, Unfederated Malay States
- Position: Winger

Senior career*
Years	Team	Apps	(Gls)
- Kedah FA

International career
- Malaysia
- * Club domestic league appearances and goals

Looi Loon Teik (Chinese: 雷隆德; born 15 February 1945) is a Malaysian former footballer. Loon Teik represented Kedah FA in the 1970s and early 1980s during his football career. He also played for the Malaysia national team. He competed in the men's tournament at the 1972 Summer Olympics and playing all three group games.

In 2004, he was inducted in Olympic Council of Malaysia's Hall of Fame for 1972 Summer Olympics football team.
