= Gary Conelly =

American swimmer

Personal information
- Full name: Gary Robert Conelly
- National team: United States
- Born: October 18, 1952 (age 73) Denver, Colorado, U.S.
- Height: 6 ft 2 in (1.88 m)
- Weight: 174 lb (79 kg)

Sport
- Sport: Swimming
- Strokes: Freestyle
- Club: Gatorade Swim Club
- College team: Indiana University

Gary Robert Conelly (born October 18, 1952) is an American former swimmer who represented the United States at the 1972 Summer Olympics in Munich, Germany. Conelly swam for the winning U.S. teams in the preliminary heats of the men's 4×100-meter freestyle relay and 4×200-meter freestyle relay. Under the 1972 Olympic rules, however, he was ineligible to receive a medal because he did not swim in the final of the relays.

In April 2024, Connelly, who at one point served as the head swim coach at the University of Kentucky, would be named in a Title IX sexual violence lawsuit which accused him of hiring suspected sexual predator Lars Jorgensen, in spite of the fact that he had been informed that Jorgensen had a sexual relationship with a female swim student he had coached while employed at the University of Toledo. Emails from June 2012 confirmed that Mark Howard, who previously served at the University of Toledo as an assistant swimming coach, informed both Conelly and University of Kentucky athletic director Mitch Barnhart about the allegation.

== See also ==
- List of Indiana University (Bloomington) people
- World record progression 4 × 100 metres freestyle relay
