= V. Krishnasamy =

Malaysian footballer (1948–2020)

Personal information
- Full name: Krishnasamy a/l Vello
- Date of birth: 13 January 1948
- Place of birth: Penang, Malaysia
- Date of death: 2 August 2020 (aged 72)
- Position: Midfielder

Senior career*
| Years | Team | Apps | (Gls) |
| 1969–1980 | Jabatan Penjara | | |
| 1969–?? | Penang FA | | |
| ??–1980 | Perak FA | | |

International career
| 1970–1976 | Malaysia | | |
- * Club domestic league appearances and goals

V. Krishnasamy (13 January 1948 – 2 August 2020) was a Malaysian footballer.

A prison officer by profession (as Malaysia football is not professional at his time), Krishnasamy represented Prison Department, Penang FA and Perak FA during his football career. He also played for Malaysia national team, and competed in the men's tournament at the 1972 Summer Olympics.

In 2004, he was inducted in Olympic Council of Malaysia's Hall of Fame for 1972 Summer Olympics football team.
