= Lim Fung Kee =

Malaysian footballer

Personal information
- Date of birth: 22 February 1950 (age 76)
- Place of birth: British Malaya
- Position: Goalkeeper

Senior career*
| Years | Team | Apps | (Gls) |
| 1970–1973 | Selangor | | |
| 1974–1981 | Seiko | | |

International career
| 1970–1974 | Malaysia | | |
- * Club domestic league appearances and goals

Lim Fung Kee (Chinese: 林方基, born 22 February 1950) is a former Malaysian football goalkeeper. In 2004, he was inducted in Olympic Council of Malaysia's Hall of Fame for 1972 Summer Olympics football team.

== Career ==
Lim played for Selangor FA in Malaysia Cup tournament in the late 60s and early 70s. He also played for the Malaysia national football team, and was in the team that qualified to the 1972 Munich Olympics football competition. In the finals, Lim played one group games, substituting Wong Kam Fook on 27 minutes against Morocco.

Lim also played in Hong Kong for professional club Seiko SA in 1974. Later, he residing there after retiring.

== Honours ==
Selangor

- Burnley Cup: 1969
- Malaysia Cup: 1971, 1972

Seiko

- Hong Kong First Division League: 1974–75, 1978–79, 1980–81
- Hong Kong FA Cup: 1974–75, 1975–76, 1977–78, 1979–80, 1980–81
- Hong Kong Senior Challenge Shield: 1973–74, 1975–76, 1976–77, 1978–79, 1979–80, 1980–81

Malaysia

- Merdeka Cup: 1974
