= Marc B. Shapiro =

American scholar & academic (born 1966)

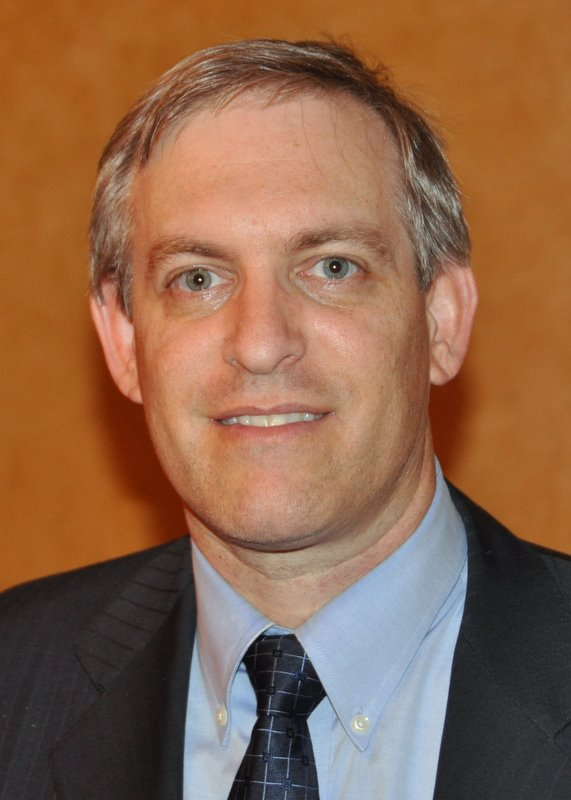
Marc B. Shapiro

Marc B. Shapiro (Hebrew: מלך שפירא, born 1966) is a rabbi, professor, and the author of various books and articles on Jewish history, philosophy, theology, and rabbinic literature.

== Education and career ==
Shapiro received his BA at Brandeis University and his PhD at Harvard University; he was the final PhD student of Isadore Twersky. He received rabbinical ordination from Rabbi Ephraim Greenblatt. Shapiro's father is Edward S. Shapiro, who has published books on American history and American Jewish history.

Shapiro holds the Harry and Jeanette Weinberg Chair in Judaic Studies at the University of Scranton. Shapiro is an online lecturer for Torah in Motion and also leads the organization's tours of Jewish historical sites in Spain, Portugal, France, Greece, Germany, Italy, Central Europe, Morocco, and Tunisia. He often writes for the Seforim Blog.

== Writing ==
Shapiro's writings often challenge the bounds of the conventional Orthodox understanding of Judaism, using academic methodology while adhering to Modern Orthodox sensibilities.

Shapiro's book, Between the Yeshiva World and Modern Orthodoxy: The Life and Works of Rabbi Jehiel Jacob Weinberg, a biography of Yechiel Yaakov Weinberg, was a National Jewish Book Award finalist. His second book, The Limits of Orthodox Theology: Maimonides' Thirteen Principles Reappraised, also a National Jewish Book Award finalist, argued against the popular Orthodox belief that Maimonides Thirteen Principles of Faith have always been regarded as unquestionable dogma. Gidon Rothstein, writing in the Association for Jewish Studies Review, called the book's collection of sources "remarkable."

Shapiro's 2006 book, Saul Lieberman and the Orthodox, discusses how the Orthodox world related to Saul Lieberman, who was a recognized Talmudic scholar who taught at the Conservative Jewish Theological Seminary of America.

Shapiro's 2008 book, Studies in Maimonides and His Interpreters, examines how Maimonides has been understood in both the traditional and the academic worlds. It also deals with Maimonides' attitude towards superstition.

In 2015, Shapiro's book Changing the Immutable: How Orthodox Judaism Rewrites Its History, was released, documenting the phenomenon of internal censorship in Orthodoxy; where Adam Ferziger said the book "is the outstanding product of a master of rabbinic literature and an extraordinarily sharp-eyed and meticulous scholar." Yair Hoffman, writing in the Hareidi online website Yeshiva World News, criticized the book, saying that "there is a plethora of material that simply should not have been included in the book because it does not back up his thesis." Ezra Glinter, writing in The Forward, praised Shapiro's "evenhanded, evidence-heavy approach" and that he was not a "polemicist," but said "his argument could also have benefited from a more critical thrust."

In 2019 Shapiro published Iggerot Malkhei Rabbanan which contains more than thirty years of correspondence with some of the world's most outstanding Torah scholars.

In 2025 Shapiro published Renewing the Old, Sanctifying the New: The Unique Vision of Rav Kook. The book deals with various original themes in Rav Kook's writings, especially his newly published works. It was a Rabbi Sacks Book Prize finalist.

== Books ==
- Between the Yeshiva World and Modern Orthodoxy: The Life and Works of Rabbi Jehiel Jacob Weinberg, 1884–1966 (London, 1999)
- Collected Writings of R. Jehiel Jacob Weinberg, 2 Volumes (Scranton, 1998, 2003)
- The Limits of Orthodox Theology: Maimonides' Thirteen Principles Reappraised (Oxford, 2004)
- Saul Lieberman and the Orthodox (Scranton, 2006)
- Studies in Maimonides and His Interpreters (Scranton, 2008)
- Changing the Immutable: How Orthodox Judaism Rewrites Its History (Oxford, 2015)
- Iggerot Malkhei Rabbanan (Scranton, 2019)
- Renewing the Old, Sanctifying the New: The Unique Vision of Rav Kook (London, 2025)
