= Stam (surname) =

Stam is a Dutch surname that may refer to

- Arnold Stam (born 1968), Dutch speed skater and cyclist
- Caroline Stam, Dutch classical soprano
- Cees Stam (1935–2014), one of many pseudonyms of Hugo Brandt Corstius, Dutch author
- Cees Stam (born 1945), Dutch cyclist
- Danny Stam (born 1972), Dutch cyclist, son of Cees
- Debby Stam (born 1984), Dutch volleyball player
- Esther Stam (born 1987), Georgian judoka
- Hans Stam (1919–1996), Dutch water polo player
- Jaap Stam (born 1972), Dutch footballer
- Jessica Stam (born 1986), Canadian model
- Jos Stam, Dutch-born computer graphics specialist
- Katie Stam (born 1986), American beauty queen and Miss America 2009
- Koen Stam (born 1987), Dutch footballer
- Marieke Stam (born 1961), retired Dutch speed skater
- Mart Stam (1889–1986), Dutch architect
- Neil Stam, (born 1942), American footballer
- Paul Stam (born 1950), American politician
- Robert Stam, American film theorist
- Ron Stam (born 1984), Dutch footballer
- Stefan Stam (born 1979), Dutch footballer

== See also ==
- The Murder of John and Betty Stam, in China in 1934
- Stamm
