= Lars Jorgensen =

American swimmer, Olympic athlete and coach

Personal information
- Full name: Lars Ploug Jorgensen
- National team: United States
- Born: September 1, 1970 (age 55) San Diego, California, U.S.
- Occupation: Collegiate swim coach
- Height: 6 ft 1 in (1.85 m)
- Weight: 176 lb (80 kg)

Sport
- Sport: Swimming
- Strokes: Freestyle
- Club: Blue Fins Swim Club; San Diego, CA
- College team: University of Tennessee
- Coach: Steve Eisler (Mount Carmel); John Trembley (Tennessee)
Medal record
Men's swimming
Representing the United States
Pan Pacific Games
Silver medal – second place	1989 Tokyo	1500 m freestyle
Pan American Games
Silver medal – second place	1987 Indianapolis	1500m freestyle

Lars Ploug Jorgensen (born September 1, 1970) is an American former Olympic swimmer who competed for the University of Tennessee and was a college coach at the University of Kentucky. In October 2025, the U.S. Center for SafeSport ruled Jorgensen permanently ineligible from coaching due to sexual misconduct.

== Early life ==
Born into a swimming family on November 1, 1970, in San Diego, California, Jorgensen swam at Mission Viejo High School in Mission Viejo, California and then transferred and swam for Mount Carmel High School in San Diego where he was trained by Coach Steve Eisler. Both schools had strong swimming traditions, as Mission Viejo had been a National Champion, and Mount Carmel had enjoyed five county titles and two runner-up finishes by 1987. In San Diego, Lars also swam for the Blue Fins Swim Team coached by his father Niels Jorgensen. He swam in college for the University of Tennessee ('94), where he was coached by John Trembley.

== 1988 Seoul Olympics ==
Jorgensen represented the United States at the 1988 Summer Olympics in Seoul, South Korea. He competed in the preliminary heats of the men's 1,500-meter freestyle, and finished with the 23rd-best time overall (15:39.51). Russia, West Germany and East Germany took the Gold, Silver and Bronze in the event. Jorgensen was around 33 seconds out of contending for a bronze medal.

In 1995, Jorgensen set the swim course record with 46:44 for the swimming leg of the Ironman World Championship in Kailua-Kona, Hawaii. His swim record held until 2018, when Jan Sibbersen set the new fastest swim time in 46:29. Jorgensen's swim time of 46:41 from 1998 does not count as a valid course record, as he did not complete the Ironman that year.

== Coaching career and suspensions ==
Jorgensen was the head coach of the swimming team for the University of Kentucky from 2014–2023. He had previously coached at the University of Toledo from 2004–2010, and then coached at the University of Tennessee. He began his career as an Assistant and then Associate Head Coach at Louisiana State University.

While coaching at the University of Kentucky, he was suspended in 2019 for six days without pay for failure to report sexual harassment allegations made against one of his staff members.

Jorgensen was again suspended in November 2023.

In April 2024, a Title IX sexual violence lawsuit was filed against Jorgensen which alleged that he would "prey on, sexually harass, and commit horrific sexual assaults and violent rapes against young female coaches and collegiate athletes who were reliant on him" during his time as swim coach at the University of Kentucky between 2013 and 2023, and also accused the university of "complicity." In addition to Jorgensen, former coach Gary Conelly, athletics director Mitch Barnhart, and the university itself were named in the lawsuit.

Emails from June 2012 revealed that Mark Howard, a former assistant swimming coach at the University of Toledo, informed both Barnhart and Conelly that Jorgensen was accused of having a sexual relationship with a female student he coached. Conelly, who at the time served as the University of Kentucky head swim coach, and Barnhart hired Jorgensen nonetheless. Prior to the 2024 lawsuit, the University of Toledo allegation was also previously made public in 2014, where a softball coach suing the University of Toledo for sex discrimination stated Jorgensen "had a long term romantic relationship with a player. The University hired this player as an assistant coach and eventually promoted her to head coach, passing over top candidates for this position."

Jorgensen and his lawyer denied the allegations that he groomed and eventually raped two former swimmers turned assistant coaches. Jorgensen claimed that the relationships he had with the two were consensual.

That same month, the US Center for SafeSport suspended Jorgensen temporarily for allegations of misconduct, and issued no-contact directives to him.

Jorgensen resigned from his post as head coach of the Wildcats' swim & dive program in June 2024.

In October 2025, Jorgensen was declared permanently ineligible by the US Center for SafeSport for "misconduct", specifically listing "intimate relationship involving a power imbalance; physical misconduct; retaliation; sexual harassment; (and) sexual misconduct" as the reasons.

== Personal life ==
He is the brother of fellow Olympic swimmer Dan Jorgensen, and the son of swimming coach Niels Jorgensen.
