= Neal Shapiro (equestrian) =

American equestrian (born 1945)

Personal information
- Born: July 22, 1945 (age 81) Brooklyn, New York, U.S.
- Occupations: Harness racing and show horse driver, rider, trainer, coach and owner
- Years active: 1965-76 American Equestrian Team
- Height: 175 cm (5 ft 9 in)
- Weight: 70 kg (154 lb)
- Spouses: Elisa Fernandez Shapiro, Olympian

Sport
- Sport: Equestrian, show jumping
- Coached by: Bert de Nemethy
Medal record
Equestrian
Representing United States
Olympic Games
Silver medal – second place	1972 Munich	Team jumping
Bronze medal – third place	1972 Munich	Individual jumping

Neal Shapiro (born July 22, 1945) is an American equestrian and was a silver medalist in team jumping and Bronze medalist in individual jumping in the 1972 Munich Olympics, where he became the first American Equestrian jumper to win two medals and only the third U.S. rider to win an individual medal in an Olympic show jumping event. In 1967, he began driving and training harness horses in trotting and pacing competitions, a career he continued after retiring from competitive show jumping in 1976. He purchased a stable, Hayfever Farm in 1976, and in addition to acting as a trainer, he began a career as a standardbred harness horse owner. In 2007, he moved his stables, Hayfever Farm, to Robbinsville, New Jersey. He continued to train equestrians and horses, and after ending his training career, returned to riding show horses on a limited basis in 1998. He was jumping coach for the US Equestrian Team at the Maccabiah Games in 2013.

== Career ==
Shapiro was born in Brooklyn, New York, and is Jewish.

=== Early career ===
He took up riding by five and started riding horses in shows around 1956, when he was eleven. Shapiro was largely self-taught in his early years, riding at his family’s small farm in Old Brookeville, N.Y., on Long Island. In an interview, Neal noted, “I started competing seriously in 1959 on the Long Island Circuit on a little mare named Buttons.” “At 15, I showed Music Man in Madison Square Garden in 1960.” His career took a giant step for the better when he changed his mount.

=== Uncle Max, Horse of the Year, and Nations Cups Team ===
At fifteen in 1961, Shapiro became the youngest rider to win the American Horse Show Association (AHSA) Horse of the Year title in the green jumper division aboard his horse Uncle Max. In 1963, Shapiro and Uncle Max were reserve Professional Horse Association (PHA) champions. Uncle Max was a tall gray ex-rodeo gelding that his father had purchased for him with the hope he would make a good jumper. In 1964, on Uncle Max and Jacks or Better, Shapiro took the PHA’s top two places, for the first time in the history of the PHA. Shapiro did not make the US Equestrian Team as a regular in 1964 as he was almost exclusively a show jumper as was his mount, but he borrowed a horse for the dressage, cavaletti and gymnastics, and did well enough in the Grand Prix jumping to impress the American Equestrian Team coach Bert deNemethy. deNemethy, a Hall of Fame jumper himself, invited Neal to join the Nations Cups team as one of the young riders. In the fall of 1964, Shapiro rode on the Nations Cups team at the National in New York and the Pennsylvania National Horse Show.

=== US Equestrian team ===
Around the age of 21, in late 1964 and into 1965, at a teen center in Gladstone, New Jersey, trainer-coach of the U.S. equestrian team, Bert de Nemethy began supervising Shapiro's progress as a rider. Around 18, Shapiro transferred to Rutgers University. In 1966 Shapiro won in the Grand Prix of Aachen, West Germany against 80 of the World's top riders. Shapiro won in 1966 on his mount Jacks or Better and won again in 1971 on Sloopy. Shapiro lacked a mount for the 1968 Olympics, but began riding Sloopy by 1970.

Shapiro remained a member of the American Equestrian team for nearly 12 years, roughly from 1965–76, with all of his training taking place at the US Equestrian Team facility in Gladstone NJ, where he remained under the supervision of Bert deNemethy, Master Horseman. In 1976, Shapiro retired from competitive show jumping.

=== Winning competitions ===
Shapiro's Equestrian wins included England's Last Chance Cup and Horse and Hound Cup, the President’s Cup in Washington, the Grand Prix of Harrisburg, the National Horse Show, The Royal Winter Fair and LaBaule, France. Shapiro was the Leading International Rider at the National Horse Show and in 1972 the AHSA named him “Horseman of the Year.”

=== 1972 Olympic medalist ===
He won a silver in the team jumping competition and a bronze medal in show jumping at the 1972 Summer Olympics in Munich, Germany. Shapiro was inducted into the United States Show Jumping Hall of Fame in 2010. Shapiro's mount Sloopy was treated for a bad virus in July 1972, and then a week before the games while riding in Munich, he landed badly on a jump receiving a cut on his hind leg that required 30 stitches. Shapiro believed the injury may have reduced Sloopy's endurance for the final jumps and caused the gelding to lose points after he nicked the tape, and knocked down two rails on a late jump, but Neal was pleased with the Bronze medal and impressed with Sloopy's stamina. Reflecting on the challenges of Olympic competition, Neal remembered, “These were tough, enormous courses. There’s a lot of pressure. You’re competing against the elite, the best in the world." In addition to his Olympic medals, Shapiro was a contributor to twelve winning Nations Cup efforts for the US Team.

After Olympic competition Shapiro and his wife, Suzy, lived on Long Island, where he was a horse owner, and trainer, and continued to drive, and train harness horses.

=== Harness racing driver-trainer ===
In 1970, Shapiro got his harness racing trainer's license. He needed a year of apprenticeship to compete as a harness racer, but it took him longer as he was travelling often with the United States Equestrian Team in the early 70's. In 1972, in addition to competing in Equestrian show jumping, he drove and trained harness horses, including some owned by his father, and worked as a harness racing driver-trainer. He began competing in harness racing around 1967 and by 1972 had competed at Roosevelt and Yonkers, Monticello and Liberty Bell, and won a few races. Harness racing came with injuries as did jumping and Shapiro broke both legs twice, and both collarbones in his career.

On September 15, 1974, as a show horseman, he attended and participated in the Nassau Grand Prix at the North Shore Equestrian Center at C. W. Post College, Brookville, New York and acted as an honorary co-chair.

He continued with harness racing, attending Bavaria Downs in 1980, though he had taken a break from the sport. Shapiro claimed to have given up Equestrian jumping in 1976 at the age of 38 in order to earn a living in another field, and harness racing was an important sideline during that period.

=== Success training harness horses ===
Around 1977, Shapiro set up shop and built a facility at a Saratoga Springs, in East central New York, at a farm which they named Hay Fever Farm of Clifton Park. Working there as a trainer for 20 years, he trained Bon Vivant, a trotter, to more than $400,000 in earnings and the pacer Bomb Rickles to winnings of more than $500,000. Bomb Rickles was also driven at times by Shapiro who drove the Standardbred trotter to one of his biggest wins in the $200,000 "Windy City Pace" at Maywood Park in Chicago on Friday, May 22, 1988, with a time of 1:56:2 taking $100,000 as the owner's share of the stakes. By 1988, Bomb Rickles had earned in excess of $250,000. Bomb Rickles had previously been victorious in a $6000 race at nearby Saratoga Raceway's Open Pace on May 2, 1988. Shapiro's greatest successes were with trotting mares and fillies, though he did well with pacers.

=== Success driving harness horses ===
In February 1984 in Pompano Beach, Florida, Shapiro drove two harness horses to wins in the same week at Pompano Park, Plymouth Lobell and Duran Lobell. By 1984, he had won 263 times in his harness racing career, collecting around $1 million in purses. In that year, he had 23 horses at his Hayfever Farms Stable, but only his horse Sunbright was considered a major figure in harness racing. Shapiro believed that in time he could train some of his less recognized horses into becoming winners. His current stable is located in Robbinsville, New Jersey which he opened with his wife Elisa Fernandez in 2007. Elisa was a three-time Olympic Equestrian for Mexico, including Tokyo, Mexico City and Munich.

On Sunday, September 11, 1988, his horse Spectre Almahurst, a three year old pacing filly, figured as a competitor in the Lady Catskill Pace at Pennsylvania's Monticello Track in Monticello, Pennsylvania. In 1996, he entered Midnight Mattness in the tenth race, for the $150,000 John W. Miller Memorial Final, at Pocono Downs.

He returned to the world of show jumpers in 1998, though taking a limited role as a rider in competition. He ended his role as a harness horse trainer that year, giving him thirty years as a successful driver and trainer of harness horses.

On February 7, 2000, Shapiro was scheduled to attend a Wildwood Charitable Foundation's event sponsored by the Wildwood Equestrian Center at the Carousel Dinner Theatre at Akron, Ohio. Some of the community benefits went to the St. Jude Children's Research Hospital.

=== Marriage ===
After having known her for forty years, he reconnected with Elisa Fernandez in 2002, formerly known as Elisa Pérez de las Heras. At her third Olympic Games in 1972 in Munich she had competed in equestrian jumping for Mexico. Neal had competed for the US and medaled at the same games. They married in 2002 and began Hayfever Farm in 2007 where they trained and taught students and horses to compete in hunting, jumping, and equitation. They also teach children and non-competition riders and board horses.

=== Maccabiah games US team coach ===
He coached show jumping for the 11-person U.S. equestrian team at the 19th Maccabiah Games (the "Jewish Olympics") in Israel in 2013.

In his spare time, Shapiro is a pilot and an organist. He began training as a pilot in his youth and considered a career as a pilot before he was selected for the US Equestrian Team. He is also skilled at shoeing horses. He is the cousin of historian Edward S. Shapiro.
