= Ricardo Marmolejo =

Mexican swimmer (born 1954)

Personal information
- Full name: Ricardo Marmolejo Álvarez
- National team: Mexico
- Born: March 29, 1954 (age 72)
- Height: 1.79 m (5 ft 10 in)
- Weight: 73 kg (161 lb)

Sport
- Sport: Swimming
- Strokes: Medley, butterfly
- College team: University of Texas
Medal record
Men's swimming
Representing Mexico
Pan American Games
Silver medal – second place	1971 Cali	400 m medley
Bronze medal – third place	1975 Mexico City	400 m medley

Ricardo Marmolejo Álvarez (born March 29, 1954) is a two-time Olympic swimmer from Mexico. He swam for the Mexico National Swim Team at the 1972 and 1976 Olympics.

He is the father of 3-time Olympian Adriana Marmolejo; his son Pablo has also been a member of Mexico's swimming national team.

Marmolejo swam collegiately in the US for University of Texas.

As a coach, Marmolejo placed a swimmer in the Olympic Games of 1992, 1996, 2000, 2004, 2008. He was the head coach of Mexico's Olympic Team in 2008. His current team, Marmo Nadadores are the 2014 State of Mexico Age Group Champions. He is the resident coach at the Comite Olympico Mexicano in Mexico City.
