= Alex Martinez =

Alex Martinez may refer to:

- Alex Martínez (footballer, born 1959), Chilean footballer
- Álex Martínez (footballer, born 1990), Spanish footballer
- Alex Martínez (footballer, born 1991), Uruguayan footballer
- Àlex Martínez (footballer, born 1998), Andorran footballer
- Alex Martinez (graffiti artist), American graffiti artist
- Álex Martínez (actor) (born 1991), Spanish actor
- Alex Martínez (weightlifter) (born 1939), Salvadoran weightlifter
- Alex J. Martinez (born 1951), Colorado Supreme Court Justice
- Àlex Martínez (tennis) (born 2001), Spanish tennis player

== See also ==
- Alexandre Martínez, Andorran footballer
- Alejandro Martínez (disambiguation)
- Alec Martinez (born 1987), American ice hockey player
