= Neil Stam =

American soccer player

Personal information
- Full name: Neil Joseph Stam
- Date of birth: January 7, 1942 (age 84)
- Place of birth: Hackensack, New Jersey, United States
- Height: 5 ft 11 in (1.80 m)
- Position: Defender

Youth career
- 1960–1963: Springfield College

Senior career*
Years	Team	Apps	(Gls)
- Paterson Dovers
- German-American F.C.
- * Club domestic league appearances and goals

Neil Stam (born January 7, 1942, in Hackensack, New Jersey) is a retired U.S. soccer defender who was a member of the U.S. Olympic soccer team at the 1972 Summer Olympics.

Stam attended Springfield College where he played on the men's soccer team from 1960 to 1963. He graduated in 1964 with a degree in sports physiology. In 1988, Springfield inducted Stam into its Athletic Hall of Fame. His career between 1964 and 1967 is unknown, but that year, he began playing with the U.S. Olympic Soccer Team as it began qualification for the finals. Stam was captain of the team which was unsuccessful in reaching the tournament. He returned to the Olympic team in 1971. This time, it was successful in reaching the 1972 Olympic Tournament where Stam played all three U.S. games. The U.S. went 0–2–1. When he went to the 1972 Olympics, Stam was listed as playing for the German-American Football Club with an unknown league affiliation. He had also played for the Paterson Dovers. He currently lives on Long Island where he teaches physical education and coaches the boys' soccer and baseball teams at Centereach High School.
