= Joaquín Santibáñez =

Mexican swimmer (born 1952)

Personal information
- Born: April 3, 1952 (age 74) Mexico City, Mexico

Sport
- Sport: Swimming
Medal record
Representing Mexico
Central American and Caribbean Games
Gold medal – first place	1970 Panama City	100m backstroke
Gold medal – first place	1970 Panama City	200m backstroke
Gold medal – first place	1970 Panama City	4x100m medley relay

José Joaquín Santibáñez Andalon (born 3 April 1952) is a Mexican former swimmer who competed in the 1968 Summer Olympics and in the 1972 Summer Olympics.

At the 1968 Olympics, Santibáñez competed in the 100 and 200 metres backstroke, the 200 metres individual medley and the 4 × 100 metres medley relay, while at the 1972 Olympics he competed in the 100 metres backstroke, 200 metres individual medley, 4 × 100 metres freestyle relay and 4 × 100 metres medley relay.
