= José Oliveros =

Mexican racewalker (born 1948)

Personal information
- Nationality: Mexican
- Born: 29 April 1948 (age 77)

Sport
- Sport: Athletics
- Event: Racewalking

José Oliveros de la Torre (born 29 April 1948) is a Mexican racewalker. He competed at the 1968 Summer Olympics and the 1972 Summer Olympics.
