= Francisca de Gutierrez =

Mexican archer (born 1944)

Francisca de Gutierrez (born 5 May 1944) is a former archer who represented Mexico in archery at the 1972 Summer Olympic Games.

== Olympics ==
She competed in the women's individual event and finished tenth with a score of 2353 points.
