= Othman Abdullah (Malaysian footballer) =

Malaysian footballer

Personal information
- Full name: Othman bin Abdullah
- Date of birth: 13 March 1945
- Date of death: 31 January 2015 (aged 69)
- Place of death: Johor Bahru, Malaysia
- Position: Defender

International career
Years	Team	Apps	(Gls)
- Malaysia

Othman Abdullah (13 March 1945 – 31 January 2015) was a Malaysian footballer. He competed in the men's tournament at the 1972 Summer Olympics. He also playing all three group games.

In 2004, he was inducted in Olympic Council of Malaysia's Hall of Fame for 1972 Summer Olympics football team.
