= Francisco Vázquez (cyclist) =

Mexican cyclist (born 1952)

Personal information
- Born: 19 September 1952 (age 74)

Cycling career
- Sport: Cycling

Francisco Vázquez (born 19 September 1952) is a Mexican former cyclist. He competed in the individual road race and team time trial events at the 1972 Summer Olympics.
