= Mike Margulis =

American soccer player

Personal information
- Full name: Michael Joseph Margulis
- Date of birth: August 30, 1950
- Place of birth: St. Louis, Missouri, U.S.
- Date of death: September 15, 2018 (aged 68)
- Height: 5 ft 8 in (1.73 m)
- Position: Forward

Senior career*
Years	Team	Apps	(Gls)
- Busch Soccer Club

International career
1972	United States	1	(0)
- * Club domestic league appearances and goals

Mike Margulis (August 30, 1950 – September 15, 2018) was an American soccer player who was a member of the U.S. soccer team at the 1972 Summer Olympics. He was born in St. Louis, Missouri. He played one game for the U.S. soccer team at the 1972 Summer Olympics. Some references state that he attended St. Louis University, but he is not listed in the school's soccer records. Margulis was called into the Olympic team for the 1972 Summer Olympics. He played the third, and final, U.S. game of the tournament, a 7–0 loss to West Germany.
