= John Bocwinski =

American soccer player

Personal information
- Full name: John Anthony Bocwinski
- Date of birth: November 22, 1936 (age 89)
- Place of birth: Buenos Aires, Argentina
- Height: 5 ft 10 in (1.78 m)
- Position: Defender

Youth career
- Polonia
- Syrena

Senior career*
Years	Team	Apps	(Gls)
1955–1959	Schlitz Polonia		
1961–1963	A.A.C. Eagles		
1963–	Polonia		

Managerial career
- 1984–1985: Carthage College
- * Club domestic league appearances and goals

John Bocwinski (born November 22, 1936, in Buenos Aires, Argentina) was an Argentine-American soccer defender who was a member of the U.S. Olympic soccer team at the 1972 Summer Olympics.

== Player ==
=== Youth ===
Bocwinski, born in Argentina to immigrant Polish parents, living in Argentina until he was sixteen when he emigrated to the United States with his family. They arrived in February 1953 and settled in Kenosha, Wisconsin. Bocwinski immediately began playing soccer with local teams, first Polonia S.C. and then Syrena S.C., both located in Hammond, Indiana.

=== Senior ===
In 1955, he joined Polonia S.C. in Milwaukee, Wisconsin. He was drafted into the U.S. Army in 1959, serving his time in Germany where he was the captain of the U.S. Armed Forces soccer team. In 1961, he was released from the Army. He moved to Chicago, Illinois, where he joined the A.A.C. Eagles of the National Soccer League of Chicago. Two years later, he rejoined Milwaukee Polonia.

=== U.S. Olympic team ===
In 1970, he was selected for the U.S. Olympic soccer team as it began qualifications for the 1972 Summer Olympics. In 1971, the team played in the Pan American Games. The U.S. placed second in its first round group, but at the bottom of the standings in the final group. Despite this setback, the team went on to qualify for the Olympic tournament. Bocwinski played the first two U.S. games, a 0–0 tie with Mexico and a 3–0 loss to Malaysia.

== Coach ==
In 1983, Bocwinski became the head coach at Carthage College in Kenosha. In his two seasons as coach, he took the team to a 12-21-2 (.371) record.

In addition to playing and coaching soccer, Bocwinski also worked over thirty years for the American Motors Corporation. In 1987, he was inducted into the Wisconsin Soccer Association Hall of Fame.
