= Dieter Mietz =

German footballer

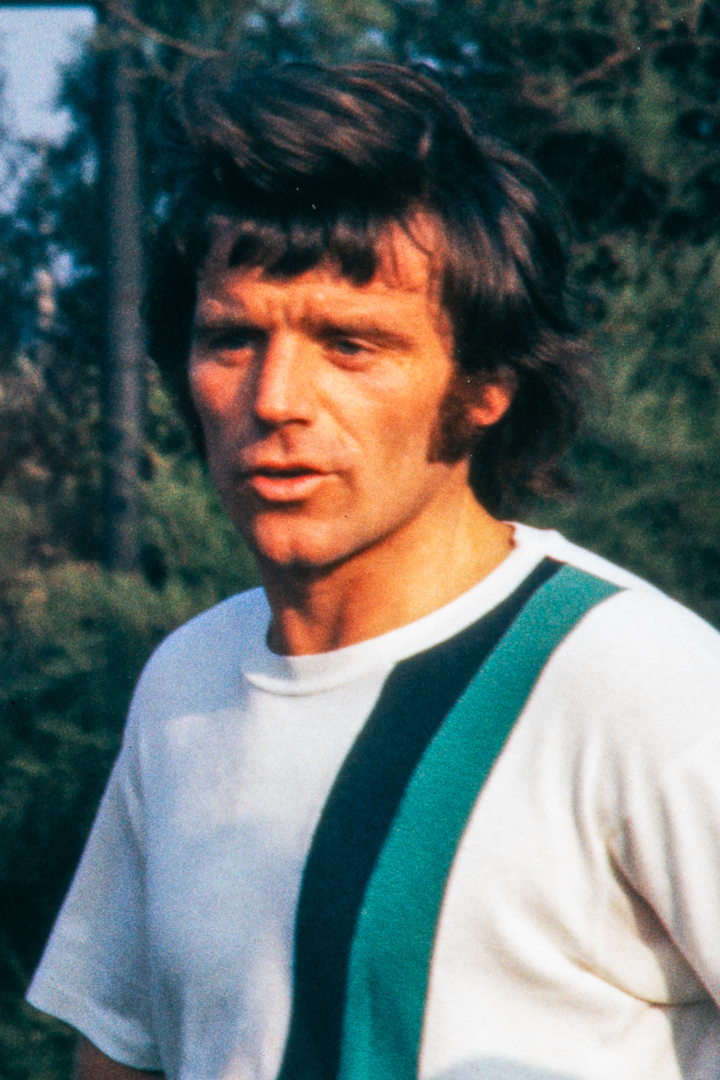

Personal information
- Date of birth: 3 September 1943 (age 83)
- Place of birth: Olsztyn, Poland
- Height: 1.76 m (5 ft 9 in)
- Position: Defender

Senior career*
Years	Team	Apps	(Gls)
1966–1971	SG Wattenscheid 09		
1971–1972	Borussia Dortmund	29	(0)
1972–1974	Sportfreunde Siegen		

International career
- West Germany
- * Club domestic league appearances and goals

Dieter Mietz (born 3 September 1943) is a German former footballer who played as a defender. He competed for West Germany in the men's tournament at the 1972 Summer Olympics.
