= Essul Badu Mensah =

Ghanaian footballer

Kobina Badu Essel Mensah
Personal information
- Date of birth: 14 September 1944 (age 82)
- Place of birth: Kofi Ansah, Ghana
- Date of death: 11th November 2022
- Place of death: Walstedt Germany
- Position: Goalkeeper

International career
Years	Team	Apps	(Gls)
- Ghana

Kobina Badu Essel-Mensah (born 14 September 1944) is a Ghanaian footballer. He competed in the men's tournament at the 1972 Summer Olympics.
