= Ahmed Abdo Mustafa =

Sudanese footballer

Personal information
- Nationality: Sudanese
- Born: 1946
- Died: September 20, 2016 (aged 69–70); Khartoum, Sudan

Sport
- Sport: Football

Abdu Mustafa Ahmed (born 1946) is a Sudanese footballer. He competed in the 1972 Summer Olympics.
