= José Luis Prado =

Mexican swimmer (born 1956)

Personal information
- Born: November 12, 1956 (age 69)

Sport
- Sport: Swimming
- Strokes: Freestyle, butterfly, medley
Medal record
Representing Mexico
Central American and Caribbean Games
Gold medal – first place	1974 Santo Domingo	4x200m freestyle relay

José Luis Prado Medel (born 12 November 1956) is a former Mexican butterfly, freestyle and medley swimmer who competed in the 1972 Summer Olympics and in the 1976 Summer Olympics.
