= Hugo Valencia (swimmer) =

Mexican swimmer

Personal information
- Born: 19 May 1953 (age 73)

Sport
- Sport: Swimming

Hugo Valencia (born 19 May 1953) is a Mexican former swimmer. He competed in three events at the 1972 Summer Olympics.
