= Wally Ziaja =

Austrian-born American soccer player

Personal information
- Full name: Walter Eric Ziaja
- Date of birth: July 2, 1949 (age 77)
- Place of birth: Linz, Austria
- Height: 5 ft 9 in (1.75 m)
- Position: Defender

Senior career*
Years	Team	Apps	(Gls)
1973	Atlanta Chiefs	1	(0)
1974	Denver Dynamos	5	(0)

International career
1973	United States	4	(0)

Managerial career
- Arrowhead High School
- Whitefish Bay High School
- * Club domestic league appearances and goals

Walter "Wally" Ziaja (born July 2, 1949) is a retired American soccer defender. He spent two seasons in the North American Soccer League and was a member of the U.S. soccer team at the 1972 Summer Olympics. He also earned four caps with the U.S. national team in 1973.

== Player ==
=== National teams ===
Ziaja was selected to play with the U.S. team at 1972 Summer Olympics in Munich. The U.S. went 0-2-1 in group play and failed to qualify for the second round. Ziaja played only one match, the 7–0 loss to West Germany. He earned his first cap on March 20, 1973, in a 4–0 loss to Poland. His last game was a 2–0 loss to Israel on November 15, 1973.

=== Professional ===
In 1973, Ziaja signed with the Atlanta Chiefs of the North American Soccer League (NASL). At the end of the season, the Chiefs moved to Denver where it became the Denver Dynamos. Ziaja played the 1974 NASL season with the Dynamo then left the league.

== Coach ==
Ziaja later went on to coach at Arrowhead High School. In 2002, he became the girls' soccer coach at Whitefish Bay High School.

He is a member of the Wisconsin Soccer Hall of Fame.
