= Mustapha El-Zaghrari =

Moroccan footballer (1949–2013)

Personal information
- Date of birth: 1949
- Date of death: June 2013 (aged 63–64)
- Position: Forward

Senior career*
Years	Team	Apps	(Gls)
- Wydad AC

International career
- Morocco
- * Club domestic league appearances and goals

Mustapha El-Zaghrari (1949 – June 2013) was a Moroccan footballer. He competed in the men's tournament at the 1972 Summer Olympics.
