= Christin-Marie Stamm =

German politician (born 1991)

Member of the Landtag of North Rhine-Westphalia
- Incumbent
- Assumed office 1 June 2022

Personal details
- Born: 20 August 1991 (age 35)
- Party: Social Democratic Party (since 2010)

Christin-Marie Stamm (born 20 August 1991) is a German politician serving as a member of the Landtag of North Rhine-Westphalia since 2022. She has served as chairwoman of SPD Women in North Rhine-Westphalia since 2023.
