= Rafael Rocha (swimmer) =

Mexican swimmer (born 1956)

Personal information
- Born: January 29, 1956 (age 70)

Sport
- Sport: Swimming
- Strokes: Backstroke
Medal record
Representing Mexico
Central American and Caribbean Games
Gold medal – first place	1974 Santo Domingo	200m backstroke

Rafael Rocha Ramírez (born 29 January 1956) is a Mexican former swimmer who competed in the 1972 Summer Olympics.
