= Horst Stemke =

German-born American soccer player and coach

Personal information
- Date of birth: March 4, 1942 (age 84)
- Place of birth: Lubin, Germany (present-day Lubin, Poland)
- Height: 6 ft 0 in (1.83 m)
- Position: Defender

Youth career
- Years: Team
- 1970–1973: University of Wisconsin–Green Bay

Horst Stemke (born March 4, 1942) is a retired U.S. soccer defender who was a member of the U.S. soccer team at the 1972 Summer Olympics.

== Youth ==
Born in Lubin, Germany, Stemke grew up in Green Bay, Wisconsin. He attended the University of Wisconsin–Green Bay, playing on the men's soccer team from 1970 to 1973. He was a 1972 honorable mention (third team) All American and was inducted into the University of Wisconsin Green Bay Hall of Fame in 1993.

== Olympics ==
In 1967, he joined the U.S. Olympic Soccer Team for its ultimately unsuccessful qualification campaign for the 1968 Summer Olympics. He was called into the Olympic team for the 1972 Summer Olympics. This time around, he and his teammates made the Olympic tournament. He played all three games as the U.S. went 0–2–1. He ended his Olympic team career having played 16 total games with the team.

== Coach ==
Stemke has spent several decades coaching in the Green Bay area. He was a founding member of the Green Bay Lightning Youth Soccer Club and coached at Preble High School. He was inducted into the Wisconsin Adult Soccer Association (WASA) Hall of Fame in 1989.

His son, Kevin Stemke was an NFL punter for several years.
