= Hans-Dieter Seelmann =

German footballer (born 1952)

Personal information
- Full name: Hans-Dieter Seelmann
- Date of birth: 18 September 1952 (age 74)
- Place of birth: Munich, Bavaria, Germany
- Position: Defensive midfielder

Youth career
- 1970–1971: TSV 1860 Munich

Senior career*
Years	Team	Apps	(Gls)
1971–1976	TSV 1860 Munich	132	(4)
1976–1979	Wormatia Worms	88	(5)
1979–1980	TSV 1860 Munich	0	(0)
1980–1987	SpVgg Fürth	164	(7)
1987	SV Seukendorf		

International career
1970–1971	West Germany U18	9	(0)
1972	West German amateur	3	(0)
1972	West Germany B	1	(0)
1972	West Germany Olympic	0	(0)
Signature
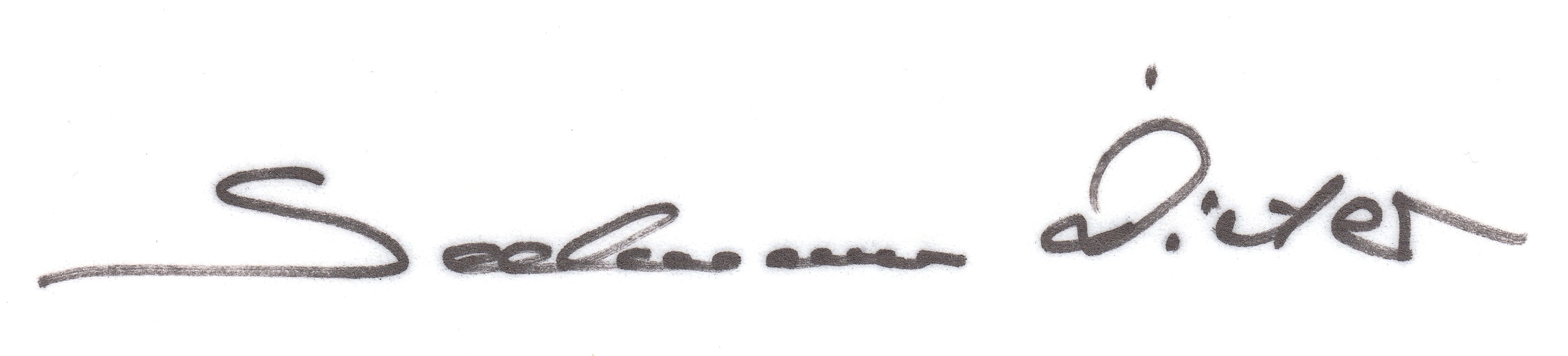
- * Club domestic league appearances and goals

Hans-Dieter Seelmann (born 18 September 1952) is a retired German footballer. Nicknamed "Datschi", he played as a defensive midfielder for TSV 1860 Munich, Wormatia Worms and SpVgg Fürth throughout the 1970s and the 1980s. He was recognized more for his international career, representing hosts West Germany for the 1972 Summer Olympics.

== Club career ==
Following his career with the youth team of TSV 1860 Munich that begun in 1970, Seelmann would be promoted to the professional squad for the 1971–72 season. In his first professional year in the former second tier Regionalliga Süd, he played 32 games out of a possible 36 and scored one goal in the home game against KSV Hessen Kassel which ended 1-1. With 1860, Seelmann finished third in each of the last three seasons of the former Regionalliga from the 1971–72 season to the 1973–74 season, missing out the Bundesliga promotion playoffs against Kickers Offenbach, Bayern Hof, SV Darmstadt 98, Karlsruher SC, FC Augsburg and 1. FC Nürnberg. Even with the arrival of players such as Ferdinand Keller and Hans-Joachim Weller from Hannover 96 in his second season, the team would ultimately be unable to harmonize and would stay within the second division of German football.

Seelmann remained loyal to the Löwen for a total of five seasons until the end of the 1975–76 season. This was due to the club repeatedly missing promotion to the Bundesliga with the club being forced to take rigorous austerity measures due to increasing debt as Seelmann went to amateur league club Wormatia Worms. Seelmann, who had been promoted to team captain throughout his career, played a total of 132 games in the white and blue jersey and from 1974 to 1976 in the 2. Bundesliga, he played 43 games with one goal as he would score four goals for this entire career.

In their first season without Seelmann in 1976–77 season, of all things, the Munich Löwen managed to get promoted to the Bundesliga. Seelmann was present at the all-important 2–0 victory of his former team against Arminia Bielefeld in Frankfurt's Waldstadion. Despite betting 500 German marks on their victory on that day, he was internally heartbroken that he wasn't there with the Löwen to oversee his club be promoted to the top-flight of German football with the rest of his teammates. His new club of Wormatia Worms would also get promoted just a few days later following their victories against Borussia Neunkirchen and TuS Neuendorf in the promotion playoffs in the southwest with the club heading into the 2. Bundesliga Süd while his former club had just left for the Bundesliga.

But because the Munich team was relegated after just one season and Wormatia Worms stayed in the league, Seelmann faced his old comrades on the pitch for the first time in the 1978–79 2. Bundesliga. When 1860 Munich was promoted to the Bundesliga again at the end of the season, Seelmann returned to his old club after 60 games and three goals from 1977 to 1979 in the 2. Bundesliga for Worms but he wouldn't make a single appearance and left the club before the 1980–81 season for SpVgg Fürth. He played a total of 87 games for the Shamrocks in three seasons in which he scored two goals before ending his active career in 1987 with SV Seukendorf.

== International career ==
Seelmann's talent within youth football led him to play for the A team for the West Germany youth team as early as the 1970–71 season. On 25 November 1970, he made his debut in the international match in Lübeck against Sweden U18 alongside goalkeeper Rudi Kargus, Manfred Kaltz and Ronnie Worm with directing the German defense. In 1971, the Munich defensive hope was used in eight more youth appearances, including the 1971 UEFA European Under-18 Championship hosted in Czechoslovakia in May.

In the second half of the season in his first senior year, he was called up to the West German amateur team on three occasions by West German coach Jupp Derwall in February, March and April 1972. He also played for West Germany B on 29 March 1972. He would have his most notable international appearance a few months later as he would make the squad for the 1972 Summer Olympics as the only player who played for the Löwen and was the only player who was a Munich native. He resided at the Olympic Village alongside coach Jupp Derwall and his teammates Ottmar Hitzfeld, Uli Hoeneß, Manfred Kaltz where he would also meet American wrestling bronze medalist Chris Taylor.

Despite this, he wouldn't play a match throughout the games, appearing only as a substitute. However, he still had a minor role as two days before the decisive match against Hungary, Seelmann gave Hitzfeld a tour of his home town during the night but when the two attempted to return to the Olympic Village in the early morning, they were prevented entry to the Olympic Village due to the recent Munich massacre that had occurred against the Israeli delegation of the tournament.
