= Roberto Strauss =

Mexican swimmer (born 1952)

Roberto Straus
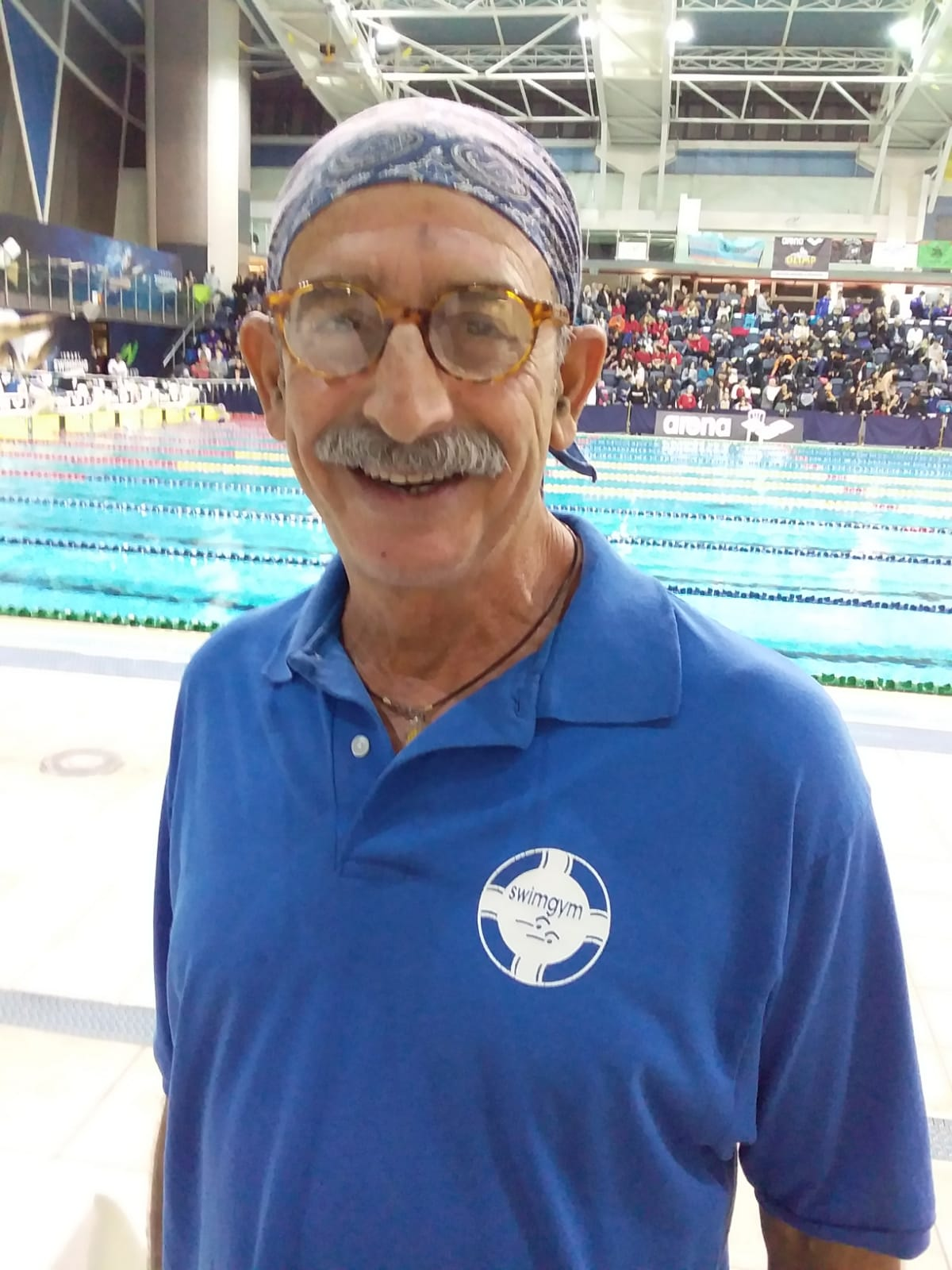
- Roberto Strauss at the Israeli swimming championship (25 meters swimming pool) December 2018

Personal information
- National team: Mexico
- Born: February 24, 1952 (age 74)

Sport
- Sport: Swimming
- Strokes: freestyle
Medal record
Representing the United States
| Event | 1st | 2nd | 3rd |
|---|---|---|---|
| Maccabiah Games | 1 | 0 | 3 |
| Central American and Caribbean Games | 1 | 3 | 2 |
| Total | 2 | 3 | 5 |
Central American and Caribbean Games
| Gold medal – first place | 1970 Panama City | 4×200 m freestyle |
| Silver medal – second place | 1970 Panama City | 200 m freestyle |
| Silver medal – second place | 1970 Panama City | 1500 m freestyle |
| Silver medal – second place | 1970 Panama City | 4×100 m freestyle |
| Bronze medal – third place | 1970 Panama City | 100 m freestyle |
| Bronze medal – third place | 1970 Panama City | 400 m freestyle |
Maccabiah Games
| Gold medal – first place | 1969 Israel | 1500 m freestyle |
| Bronze medal – third place | 1969 Israel | 400 m freestyle |
| Bronze medal – third place | 1973 Israel | 100 m freestyle |
| Bronze medal – third place | 1973 Israel | 400 m freestyle |

Roberto Strauss (born 24 June 1952) is a Mexican former swimmer who competed in the 1972 Summer Olympics. At the 1969 Maccabiah Games in Israel he won a gold medal in freestyle, and at the 1973 Maccabiah Games he won three bronze medals in freestyle, at 100, 400, and 800 meters.

Strauss attended the University of Miami on a swimming scholarship, and later opened a swim gym in South Florida.
