= Ahmed Belkorchi =

Moroccan footballer (born 1952)

Personal information
- Date of birth: 1952
- Date of death: 4 August 2021 (aged 68–69)

Senior career*
Years	Team	Apps	(Gls)
- Kawkab Marrakech

International career
- Morocco
- * Club domestic league appearances and goals

Ahmed Belkorchi (1952 – 4 August 2021) was a Moroccan footballer. He competed in the men's tournament at the 1972 Summer Olympics.
