= José Talavera =

Mexican footballer (born 1950)

José Ángel Talavera
Personal information
- Full name: José Ángel Talavera Juárez
- Date of birth: 2 August 1950 (age 76)
- Place of birth: Zacatepec de Hidalgo, Morelos, Mexico
- Height: 1.73 m (5 ft 8 in)
- Position: Midfielder

Senior career*
Years	Team	Apps	(Gls)
1971–1974	Torreón		
1974–1975	U. de Guadalajara		
1975–1977	Atlético Potosino		
1977–1978	Tigres UANL		
1978–1979	CD Coyotes Neza		

International career
1972	Mexico Olympic	3	(0)
- * Club domestic league appearances and goals

José Ángel Talavera Juárez (born 2 August 1950) is a Mexican former professional footballer who played as a midfielder. He represented Mexico at the 1972 Summer Olympics and was a member of the Tigres UANL squad that won the club's first-ever league title in 1978.

== Club career ==
Talavera began his professional career in the early 1970s, establishing himself as a reliable midfielder in the Mexican Primera División. He made his professional debut with CF Torreón, where he played from 1971 to 1974. Following his time in Torreón, he joined the newly formed Universidad de Guadalajara (Leones Negros) for the 1974–1975 season, coinciding with the club's debut in the top flight.

In 1975, Talavera moved to Atlético Potosino, spending two seasons with the San Luis Potosí-based club. His performances there earned him a move to Tigres UANL in 1977. This period proved to be the pinnacle of his domestic career. In his first season with the university club (1977–1978), Talavera was part of the historic squad that defeated UNAM Pumas in the final to claim Tigres' first-ever Primera División championship.

After the title-winning season, Talavera moved to CD Coyotes Neza for the 1978–1979 campaign. The club was a new addition to the league at the time, having recently acquired the franchise of CF Laguna. He concluded his high-level professional career shortly thereafter, leaving a legacy as a versatile midfielder during one of the most competitive eras of Mexican football.

== Career statistics ==
=== Club ===
Club	Season	League		
Club	Season	Division	Apps	Goals
Torreón	1971–72	Primera División	—	—
Torreón	1972–73	Primera División	—	—
Torreón	1973–74	Primera División	—	—
Torreón	Total		—	—
U. de Guadalajara	1974–75	Primera División	—	—
Atlético Potosino	1975–76	Primera División	—	—
Atlético Potosino	1976–77	Primera División	—	—
Atlético Potosino	Total		—	—
Tigres UANL	1977–78	Primera División	—	—
CD Coyotes Neza	1978–79	Primera División	—	—
Career total			—	—

Note: Precise appearance data for several seasons in the 1970s is currently unavailable in digital archives.

== International career ==
Talavera was a key member of the Mexico national amateur team during the early 1970s. His most significant international contribution came in 1972, when he was selected by coach Diego Mercado to represent Mexico at the 1972 Summer Olympics in Munich, West Germany.

During the tournament, Talavera appeared in three matches. He played in the opening group stage matches, including a 1–0 victory over Sudan and a 1–0 win against Burma (now Myanmar). He also featured in the second group stage match against the Soviet Union. Mexico ultimately finished the tournament in 7th place.

== Honours ==
Tigres UANL

- Liga MX: 1977–78
