= Rogelio Ruiz =

Mexican footballer (born 1950)

Personal information
- Full name: Rogelio Ruiz Vaquera
- Date of birth: 20 August 1950 (age 76)
- Place of birth: Torreón, Mexico
- Height: 1.77 m (5 ft 10 in)
- Position: Goalkeeper

Senior career*
| Years | Team | Apps | (Gls) |
| 1971–1977 | Santos Laguna | 50 | (0) |
| 1977–1978 | Puebla | 11 | (0) |
| 1979–1980 | Tigres UANL | 3 | (0) |
| Total | | 64 | (0) |

International career
| 1972 | Mexico | 1 | (0) |
- * Club domestic league appearances and goals

Rogelio Ruiz (born 20 August 1950) is a Mexican former footballer. He competed in the men's tournament at the 1972 Summer Olympics.
