= Alejandro Martínez Hernández =

Mexican politician

- Born: 11 January 1962 (age 64); Tlalixtac de Cabrera, Oaxaca, Mexico
- Occupation: Politician
- Political party: PRD

Alejandro Martínez Hernández (born 11 January 1962) is a Mexican politician from the Party of the Democratic Revolution. From 2006 to 2009 he served as Deputy of the LX Legislature of the Mexican Congress representing Tlaxcala.
