= Salvador Márquez =

Mexican footballer (born 1950)

Personal information
- Date of birth: 24 December 1950 (age 75)
- Position: Midfielder

International career
| Years | Team | Apps | (Gls) |
- Mexico

Salvador Márquez (born 24 December 1950) is a Mexican former footballer. He competed in the men's tournament at the 1972 Summer Olympics.
