= David Regalado =

Mexican footballer (born 1952)

Personal information
- Date of birth: 17 January 1952 (age 74)

International career
Years	Team	Apps	(Gls)
- Mexico

David Regalado (born 17 January 1952) is a Mexican former footballer. He competed in the men's tournament at the 1972 Summer Olympics.
