= Francisco Barba =

Mexican footballer (born 1953)

Personal information
- Date of birth: 7 August 1953 (age 73)

International career
Years	Team	Apps	(Gls)
1975	Mexico	1	(0)

Francisco Barba (born 7 August 1953) is a Mexican former footballer. He competed in the men's tournament at the 1972 Summer Olympics.
