= Manuel Borja =

Mexican footballer (born 1949)

Personal information
- Date of birth: 29 August 1949 (age 77)

International career
Years	Team	Apps	(Gls)
- Mexico

Manuel Borja Garcia (born 29 August 1949) is a Mexican former footballer who played as a midfielder. He competed in the men's tournament at the 1972 Summer Olympics.
