= Alberto García (swimmer) =

Mexican swimmer (born 1957)

Personal information
- Born: July 22, 1957 (age 68)

Sport
- Sport: Swimming
Medal record
Representing Mexico
Central American and Caribbean Games
Gold medal – first place	1974 Santo Domingo	4x200m freestyle relay

Alberto García Castillo (born 22 July 1957) is a Mexican former swimmer who competed in the 1972 Summer Olympics.
