= Alejandro Peña (footballer) =

Mexican footballer (born 1949)

Personal information
- Date of birth: 20 October 1949 (age 77)
- Place of birth: Guadalajara, Mexico
- Position: Forward

International career
Years	Team	Apps	(Gls)
- Mexico

Alejandro Peña (born 20 October 1949) is a Mexican former footballer. He competed in the men's tournament at the 1972 Summer Olympics.
