= Alejandro Hernández (footballer) =

Mexican footballer (born 1948)

Personal information
- Date of birth: 11 March 1948 (age 78)
- Position: Midfielder

International career
Years	Team	Apps	(Gls)
- Mexico

Alejandro Hernández (born 11 March 1948) is a Mexican former footballer. He competed in the men's tournament at the 1972 Summer Olympics.
