= List of people from Georgia (U.S. state) =

State flag of Georgia (U.S. state)

Location of Georgia in the United States

This is a list of notable people born in, or notable for their association with the U.S. state of Georgia.

== 0–9 ==
- 2 Chainz, rapper
- 21 Savage; born in London, rapper

== A ==
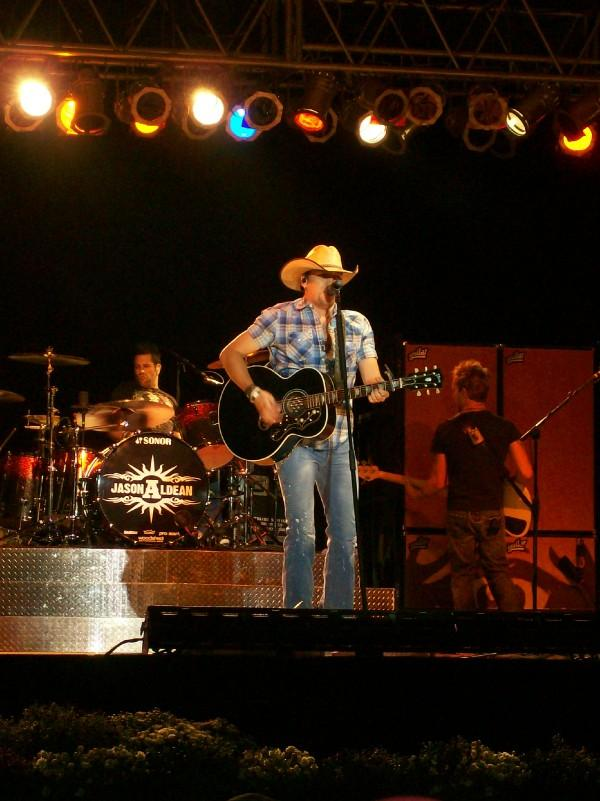
Musician Jason Aldean

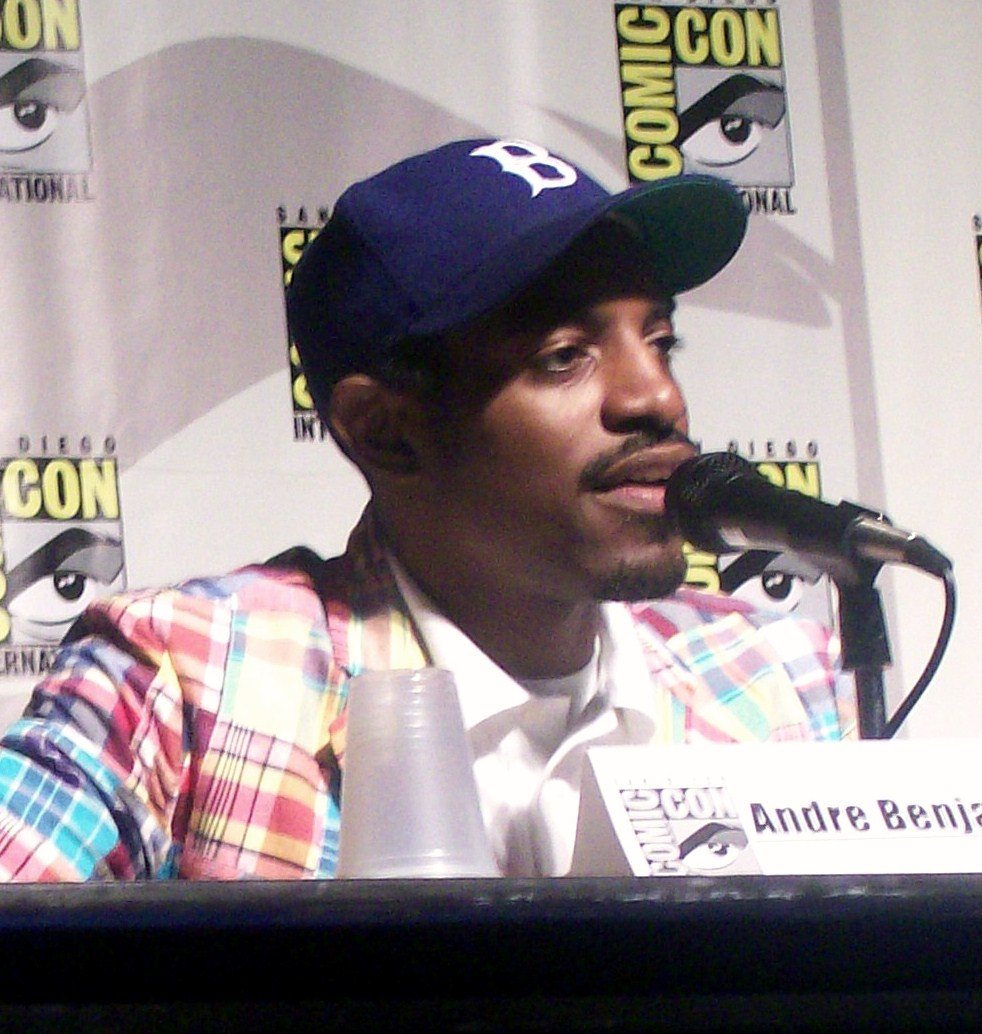
Musician André 3000

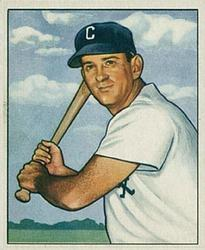
Baseball player Luke Appling

- Quinton Aaron, actor; born in New York City but raised in Augusta
- Shareef Abdur-Rahim, basketball player
- James Abercrombie, congressman
- Ralph Abernathy, civil rights leader; born in Alabama
- Stacey Abrams, politician
- Brock Adams, politician, member of Congress representing Washington state and secretary of transportation under Jimmy Carter
- Gavin Adcock, singer-songwriter
- Dianna Agron, actress, singer and dancer
- Rhett Akins, singer
- Lauren Alaina, American Idol contestant
- Jason Aldean, country singer
- Cecil Alexander, architect
- Edward Porter Alexander, Civil War general
- Margie Alexander, singer
- Dean Alford, politician
- Asher Allen, football player
- May Allison, actress
- Al-Farouq Aminu, basketball player
- Alade Aminu (born 1987), Nigerian-American basketball player
- Joe Amisano, architect
- Bill Anderson, singer; born in South Carolina
- Brooke Anderson, television personality
- Erika Anderson, engineer, STEM advocate
- George T. Anderson, Civil War general
- Nicole Gale Anderson, actress
- Robert H. Anderson, cavalry and artillery officer in the Confederate States Army during the Civil War
- Shandon Anderson, basketball player
- André 3000, rapper, singer, record producer and actor
- David Andrews, football player
- Edward Andrews, actor
- William Andrews, football player
- Luke Appling, baseball player; born in North Carolina
- Johnny Archer, billiards player
- Anthony J. Arduengo, III, chemist; born in Florida
- Robert Arrington, philosopher
- Murray Attaway, musician
- Lee Atwater, Republican political strategist
- Scott Aukerman, writer, actor, comedian
- Lisa Aukland, professional bodybuilder and powerlifter
- Tyler Austin, baseball player

== B ==
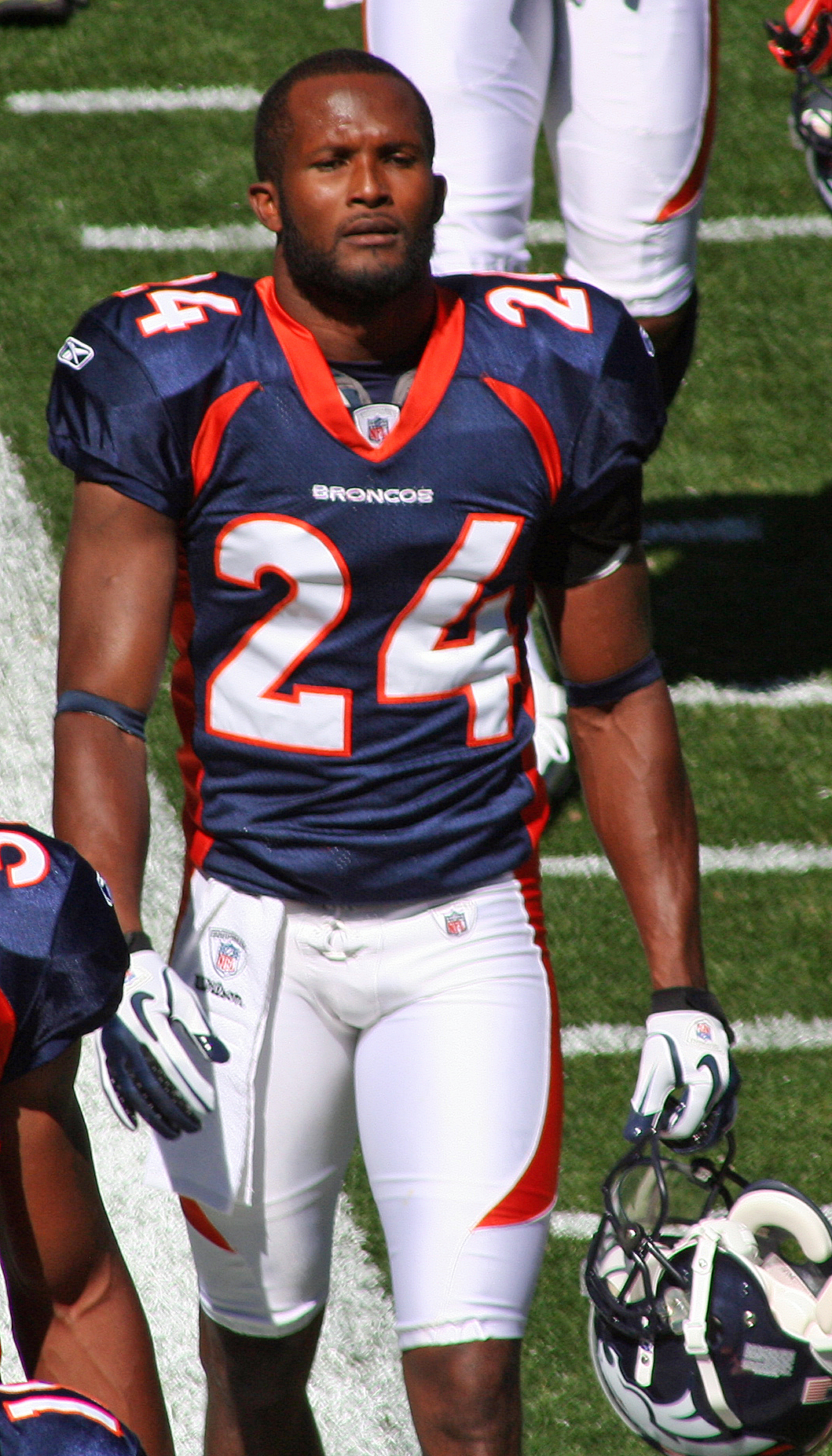
Football player Champ Bailey

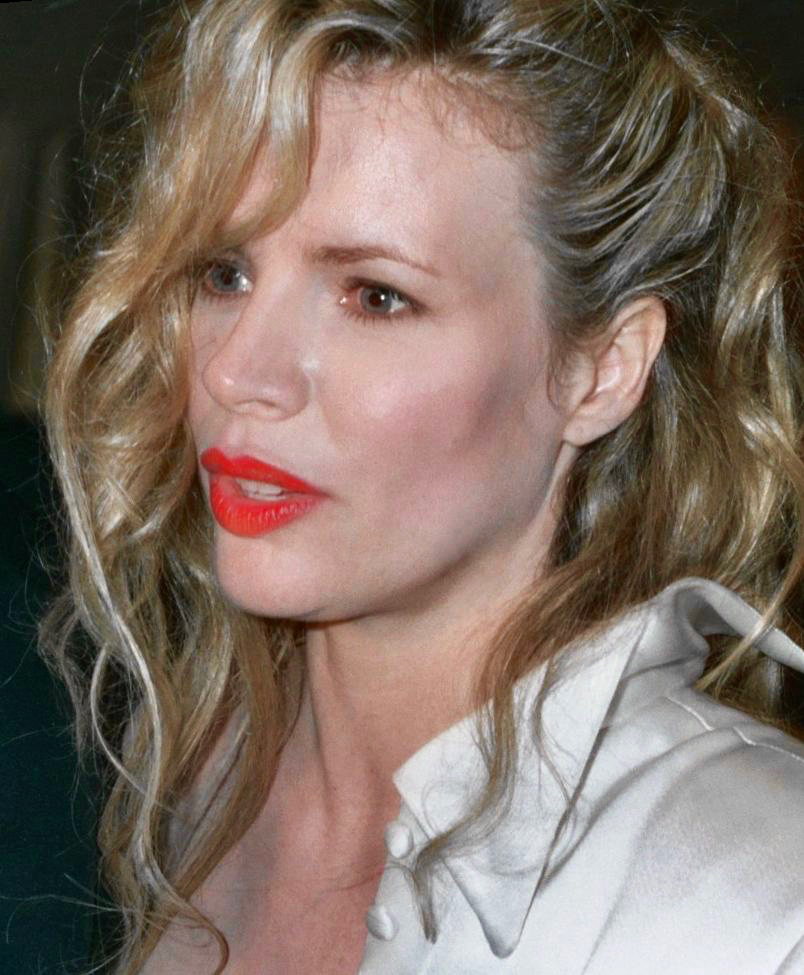
Actress and model Kim Basinger

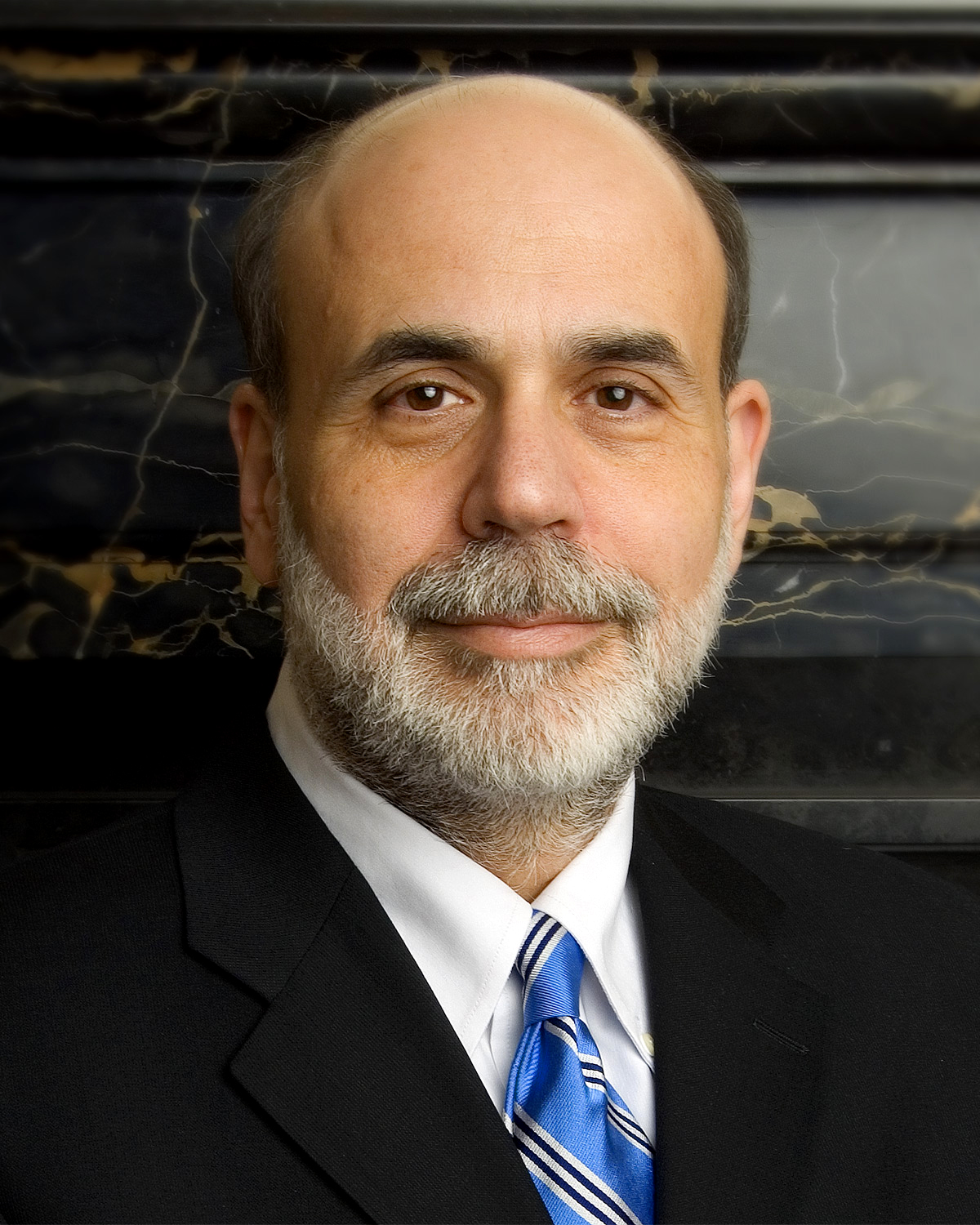
Economist Ben Bernanke

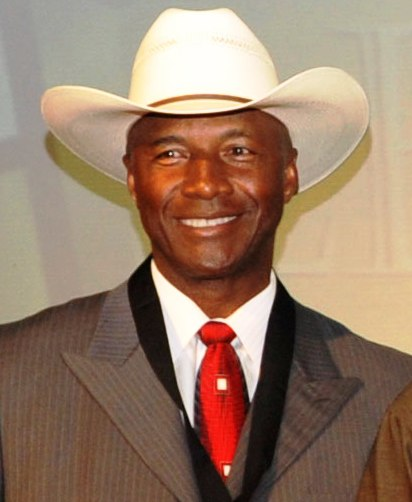
American football player Mel Blount

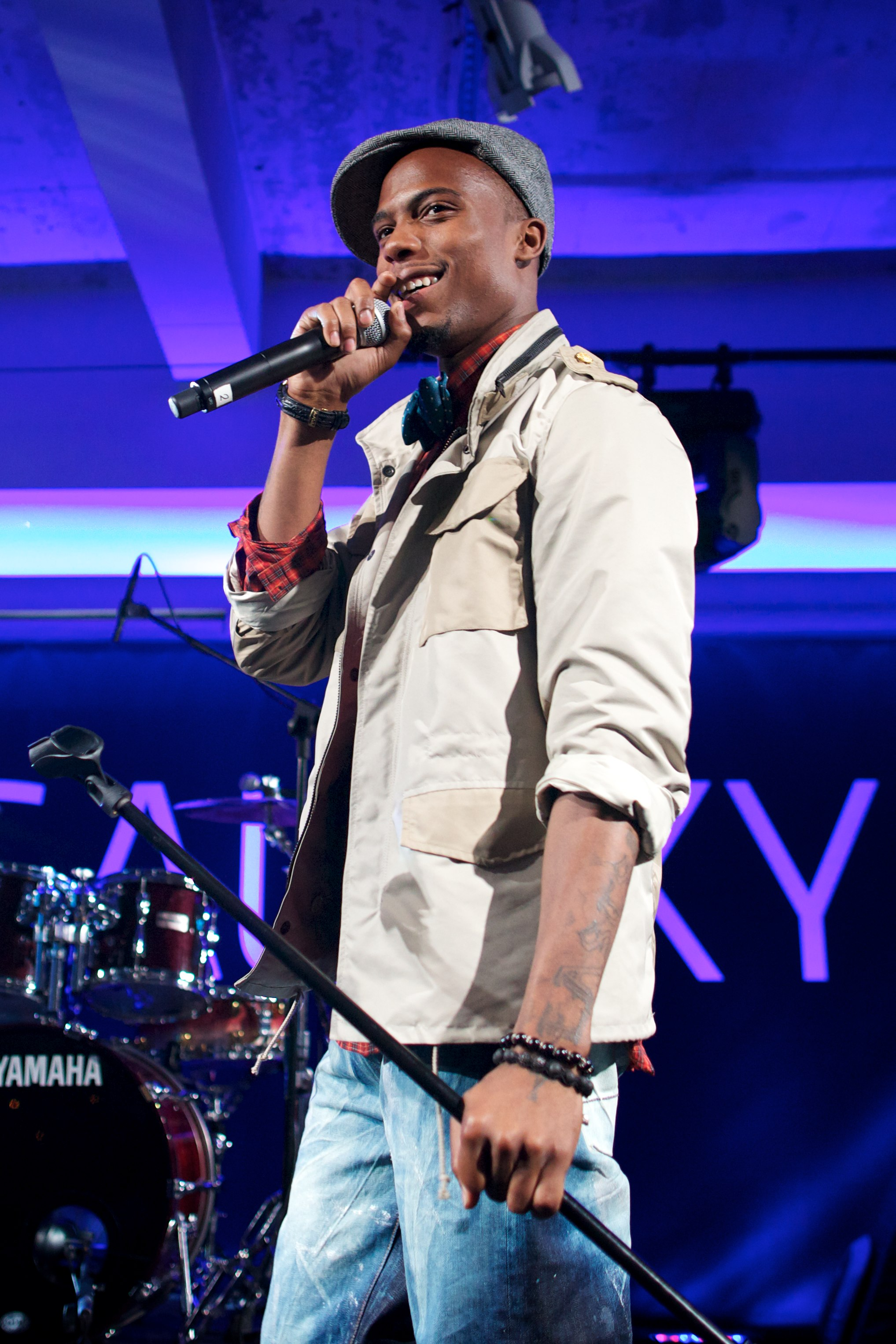
Musician B.o.B

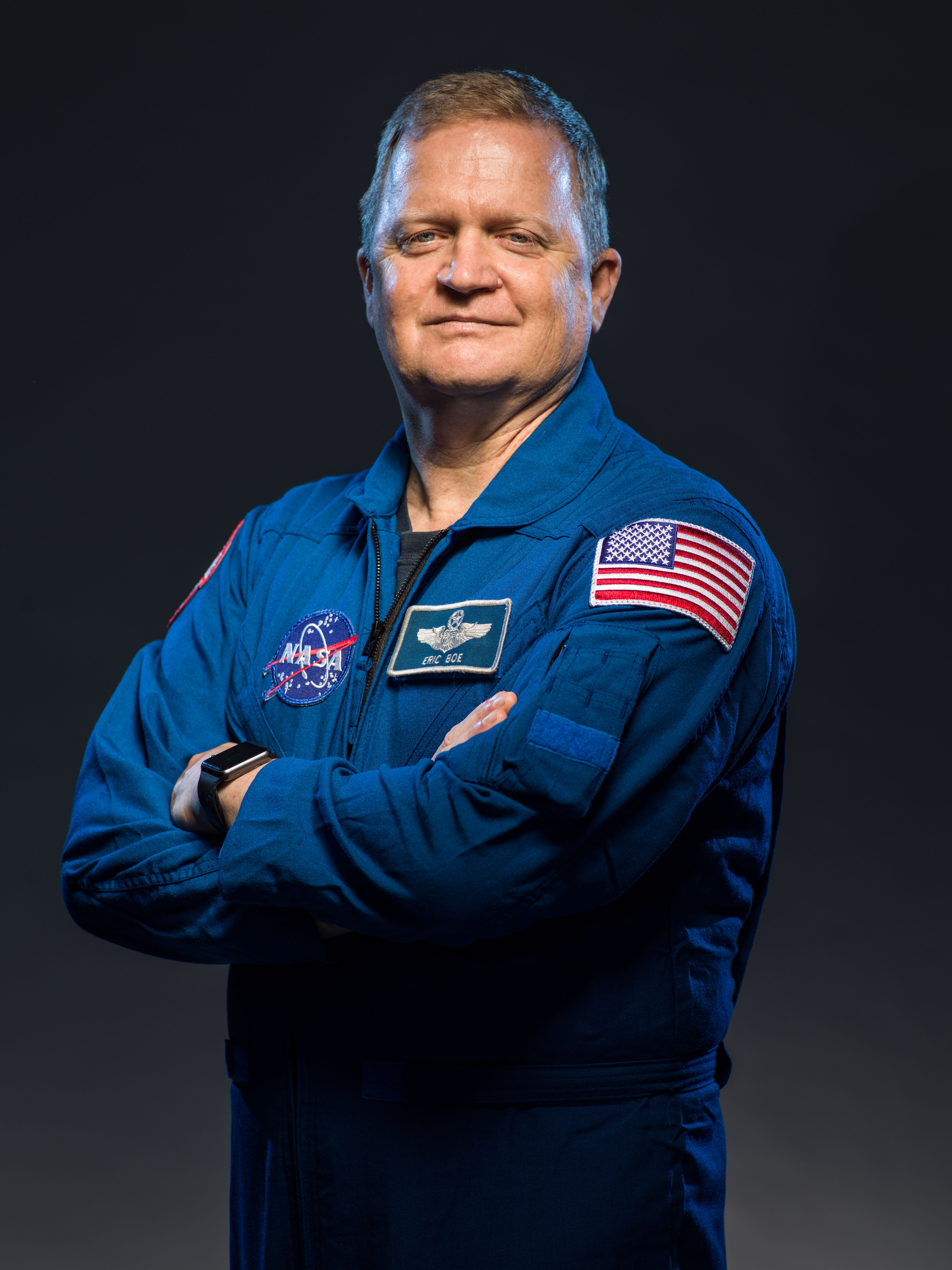
Astronaut Eric Boe

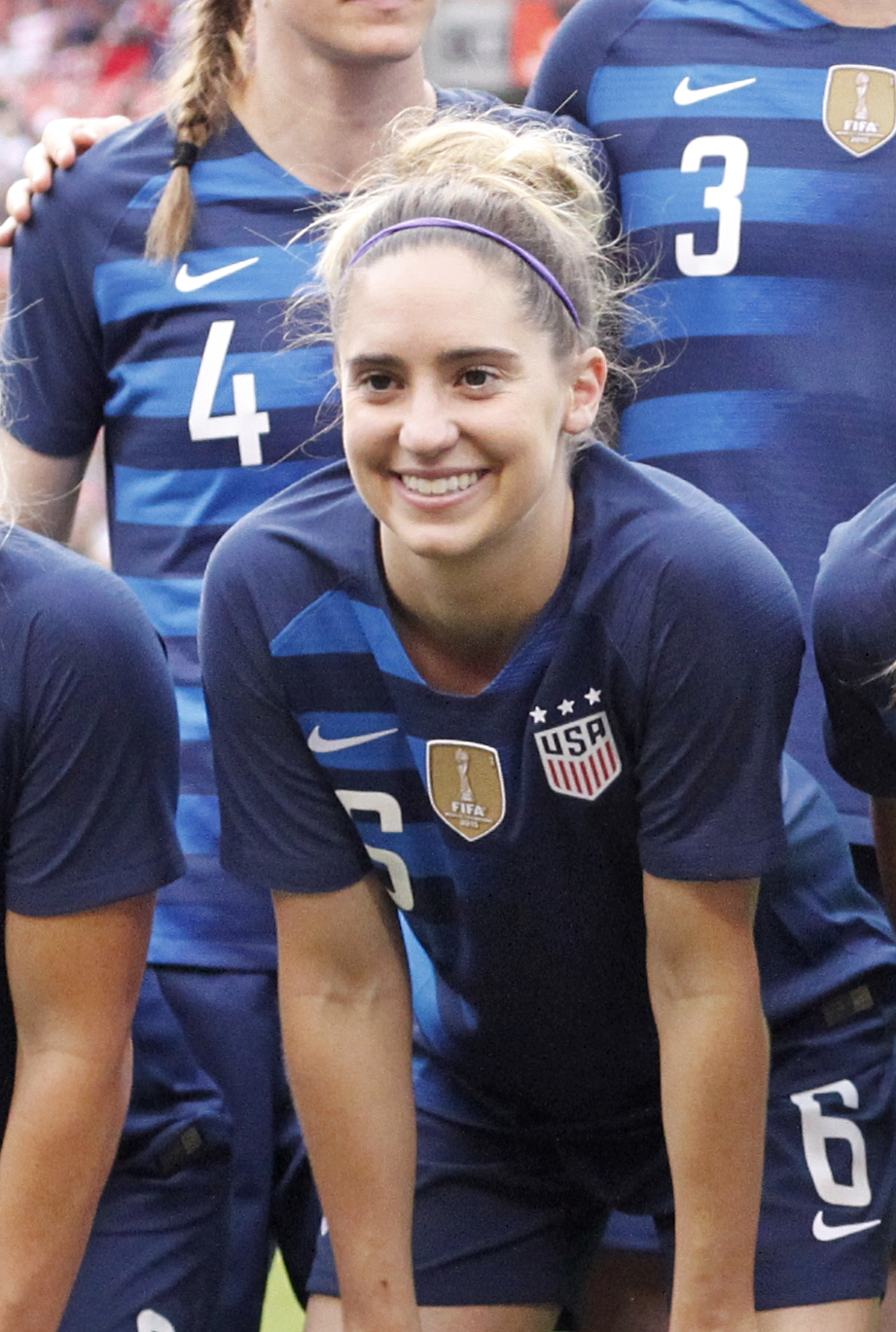
Soccer player Morgan Brian

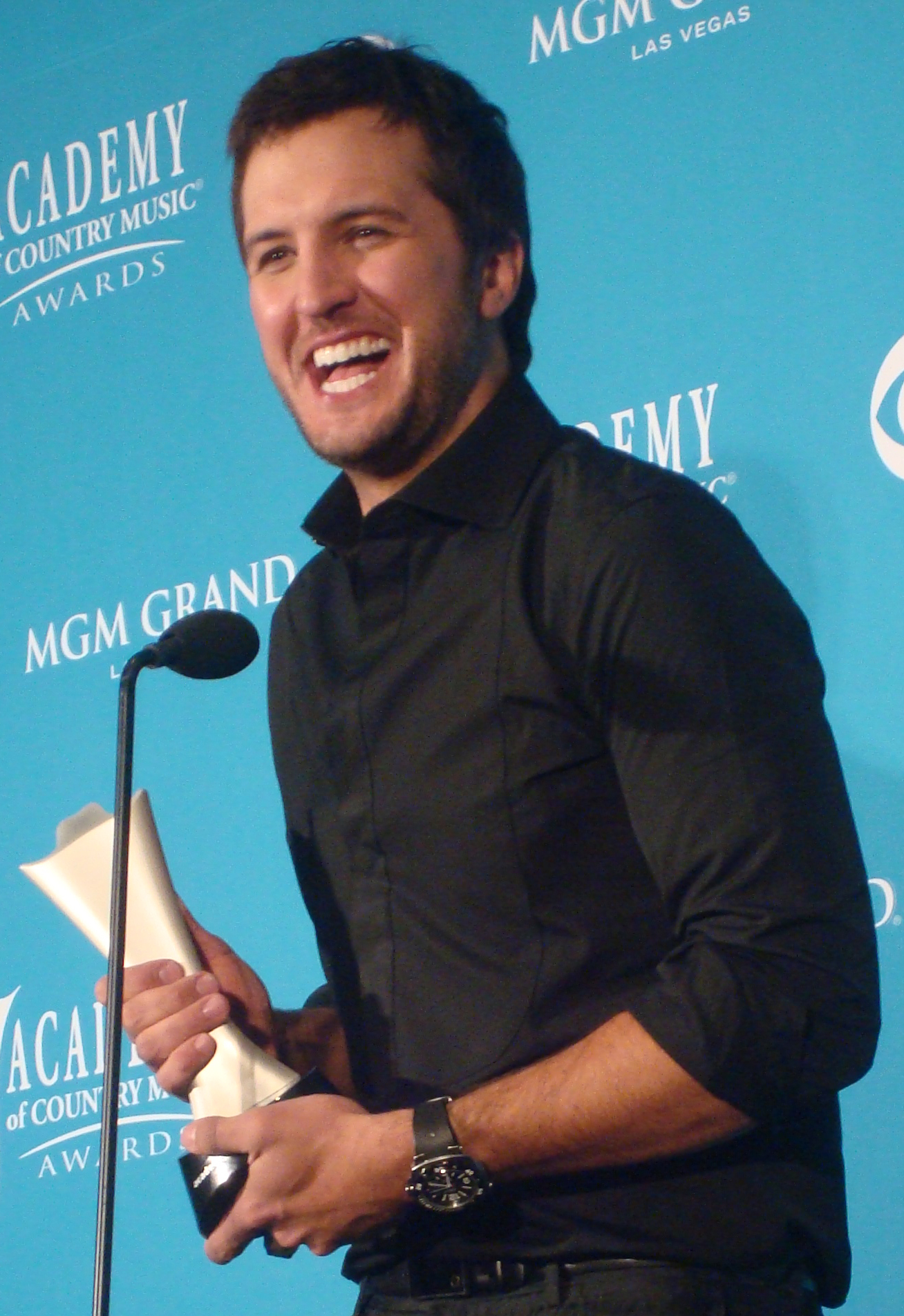
Musician Luke Bryan

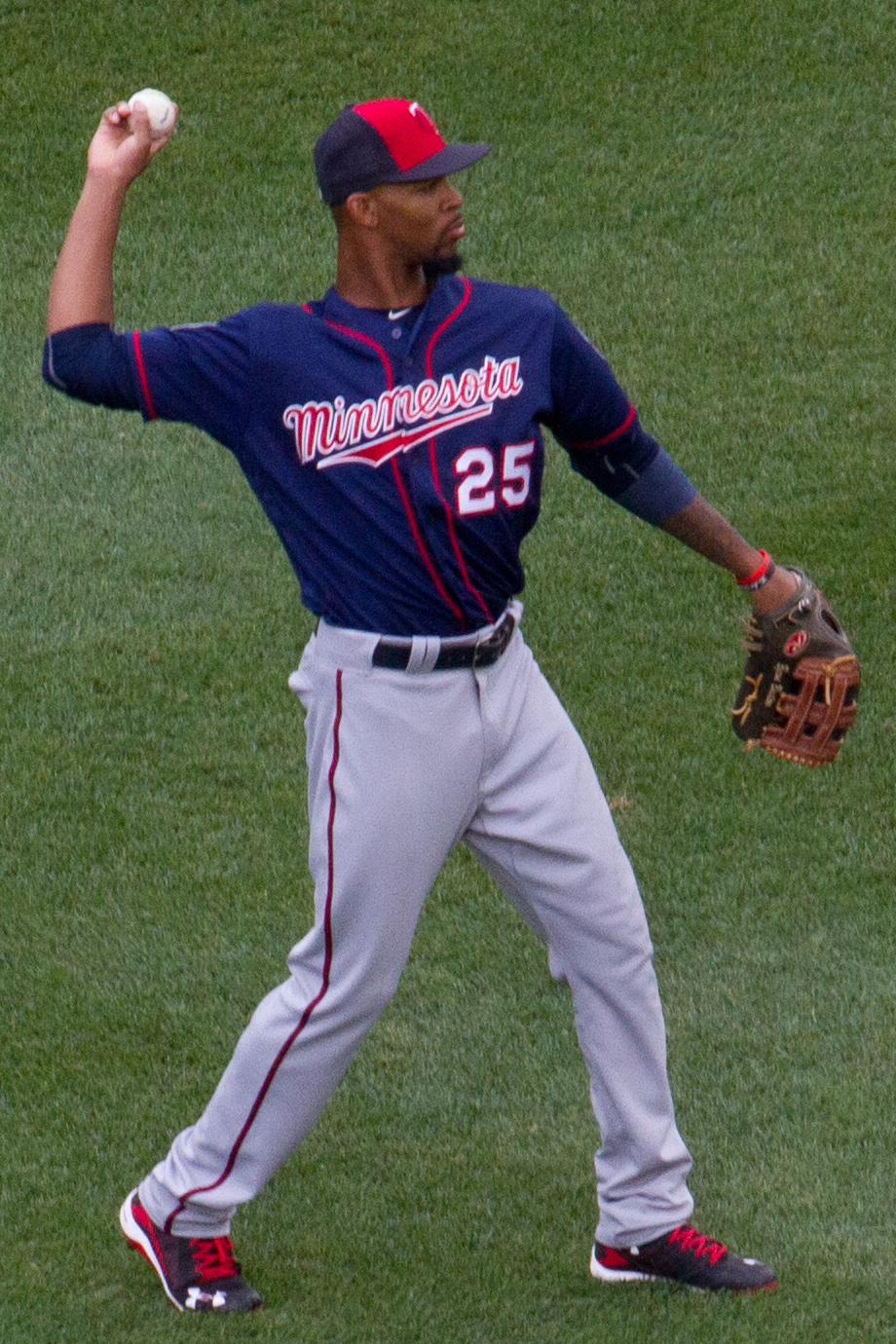
Baseball player Byron Buxton

- Baby Tate, rapper and singer
- Jeff Backus, football player; born in Michigan
- Burke Badenhop, baseball player
- Allen Bailey, football player
- Champ Bailey, football player
- Chloe Bailey, singer-songwriter
- Halle Bailey, singer and actress
- Samaria (Mitcham) Bailey, civil rights activist
- Abraham Baldwin, politician, founding father; born in Connecticut
- Brooke Baldwin, journalist
- Alan Ball, screenwriter
- James Banks III (born 1998), basketball player
- Mary Ross Banks, litterateur, writer
- Ellison Barber, journalist
- Cornelia Bargmann, neurobiologist; born in Virginia
- Chris Barnes, actor
- Harris Barton, All Pro NFL offensive lineman
- Francis S. Bartow, lawyer; politician
- Kim Basinger, actress
- Matt Battaglia, football player
- Jerome Preston Bates, actor
- Cullen A. Battle, Civil War general
- Brian Baumgartner, actor
- Alex W. Bealer, blacksmith
- Amanda Bearse, actress; born in Florida
- Vic Beasley, football player
- Matt Beaty, baseball player
- Gordon Beckham, baseball player
- Tim Beckham, baseball player
- Buck Belue, football player
- William Tapley Bennett Jr., ambassador to the Dominican Republic
- Henry L. Benning, Civil War general
- Anna Benson, model
- Kris Benson, baseball player; born in Wisconsin
- Fonzworth Bentley, musician
- Ben Bernanke, economist, chairman of the Federal Reserve
- Eric Berry, football player
- John Berry, singer; born in South Carolina
- Martha Berry, educator; born in Alabama
- Antoine Bethea, football player
- Erin Bethea, actress
- Big Boi, rapper; songwriter; record producer; actor
- John Birch, missionary, WWII intelligence officer; born in India
- Furman Bisher, sportswriter; born in North Carolina
- Norman Blake, musician; born in Tennessee
- Mary J. Blige, singer; born in New York City
- Darrell Blocker, nicknamed "The Spy Whisperer", CIA agent
- Ron Blomberg (born 1948), baseball player
- Jaron Blossomgame (born 1993), basketball player in the Israeli Basketball Premier League
- Mel Blount, football player
- B.o.B, musician; record producer; born in North Carolina
- Eric A. Boe, space shuttle pilot; born in Florida
- Mitchell Boggs, baseball player
- Skye Bolt (born 1994), baseball player for the San Francisco Giants
- Casey Bond, actor, baseball player
- Julian Bond, politician and activist; born in Tennessee
- Eddie Bonine, baseball player
- Boondox, rapper
- Neal Boortz, radio personality; born in Pennsylvania
- Big Bossman, professional wrestler
- John S. Bowen, Civil War general
- Blaine Boyer, baseball player
- Brandon Boykin, football player
- Johanna Braddy, actress
- Deion Branch, football player
- Russell Branyan, baseball player
- Morgan Brian, soccer player; USWNT/Houston Dash midfielder
- June Brigman, comic book artist
- Jasper Brinkley, football player
- Keith Brooking, football player
- Marshon Brooks, basketball player; born in New Jersey
- Alton Brown, chef, television personality; born in California
- Bryce Brown (born 1997), basketball player in the Israeli Basketball Premier League
- James Brown, singer; born in South Carolina
- Kane Brown, singer
- Jim Brown, football player
- Joseph E. Brown, politician; born in South Carolina
- Kevin Brown, baseball player
- Kwame Brown, basketball player; born in South Carolina
- Reggie Brown, football player
- Ronnie Brown, football player
- Trenton Brown, football player
- Zac Brown, musician
- Jonathan Broxton, baseball player
- Goode Bryan, Civil War general
- Luke Bryan, musician
- Elijah Bryant (born 1995), basketball player in the Israeli Basketball Premier League
- Jason Bulger, baseball player
- Tituss Burgess, actor, singer
- Morgan Burnett, football player; born in Tennessee
- Billy Burns, baseball player
- M. Michele Burns, businesswoman
- Kandi Burruss, singer, actress
- Denise Burse, actress
- Frank Bush, football player
- Brice Butler, football player
- Drew Butler, football player
- James Butler, football player
- Byron Buxton, baseball player
- Dan Byrd, actor
- Elia Goode Byington, journalist
- Marlon Byrd, baseball player; born in Florida
- Thomas Jefferson Byrd, actor

== C ==
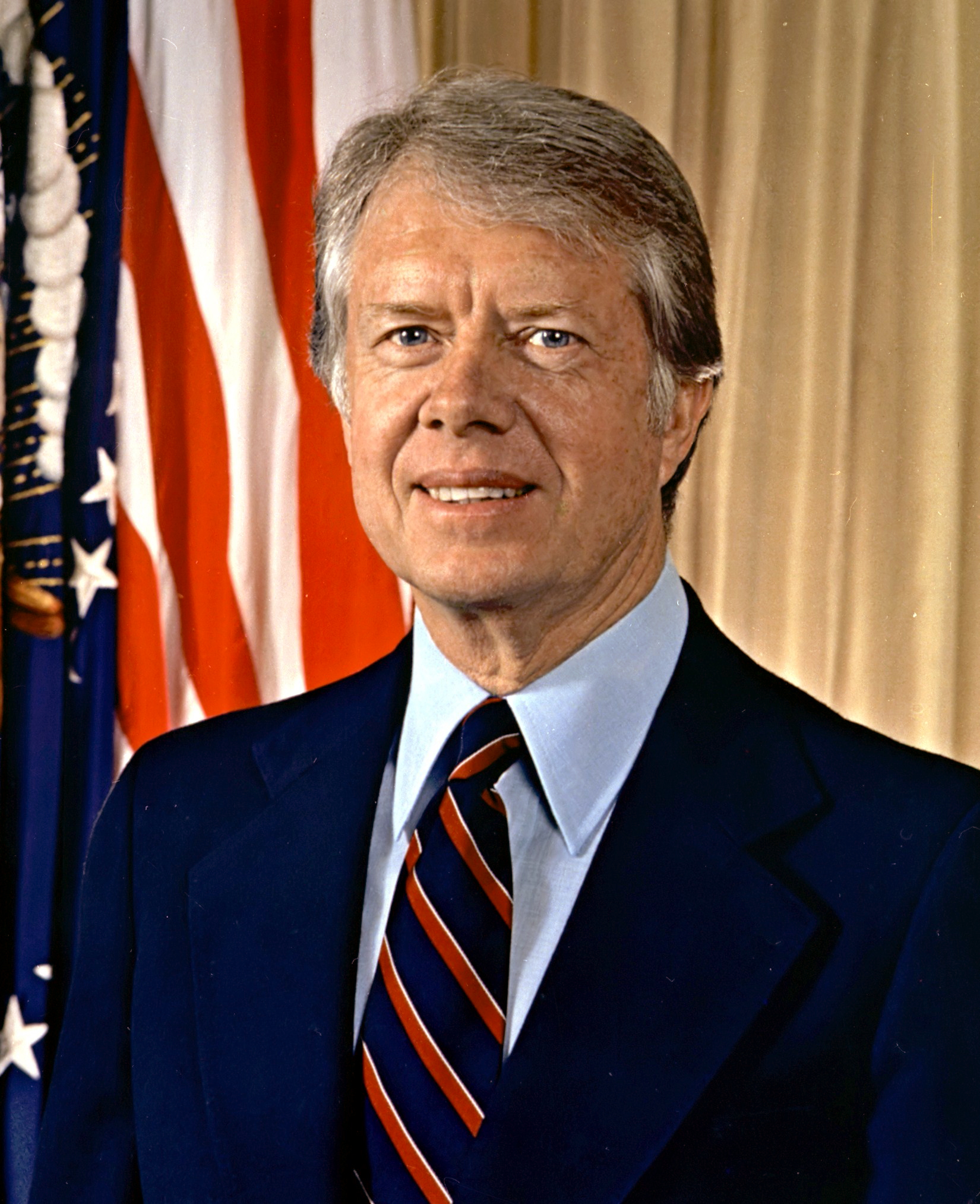
Former U.S. President Jimmy Carter

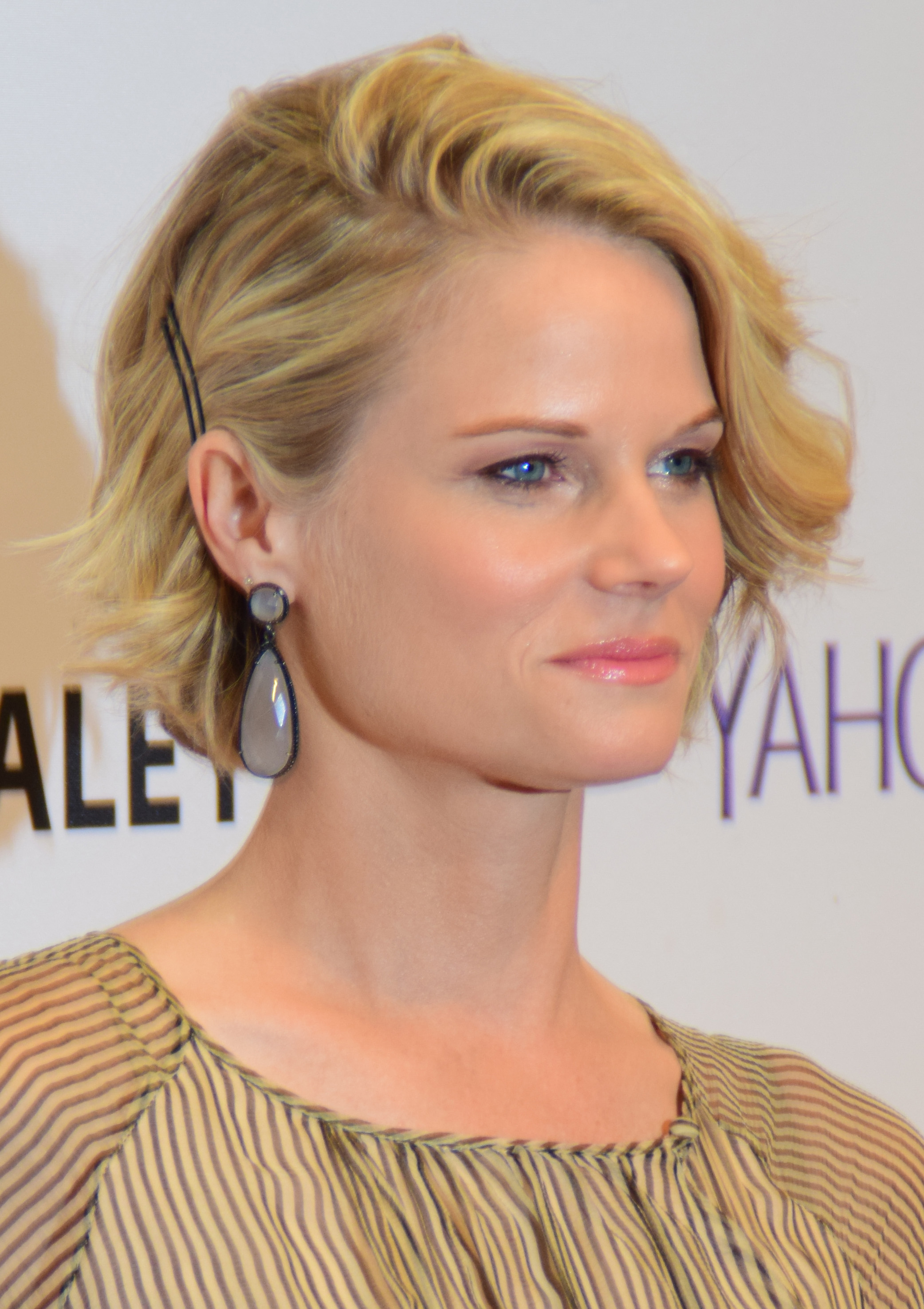
Actress and model Joelle Carter

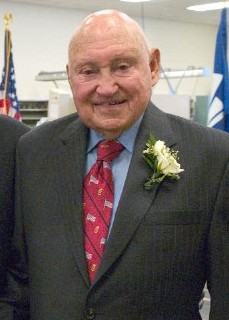
Businessman and philanthropist S. Truett Cathy

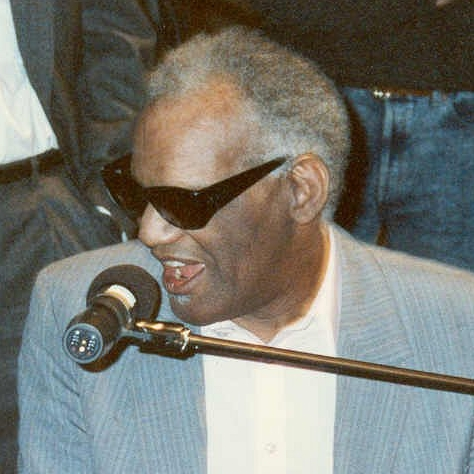
Musician Ray Charles

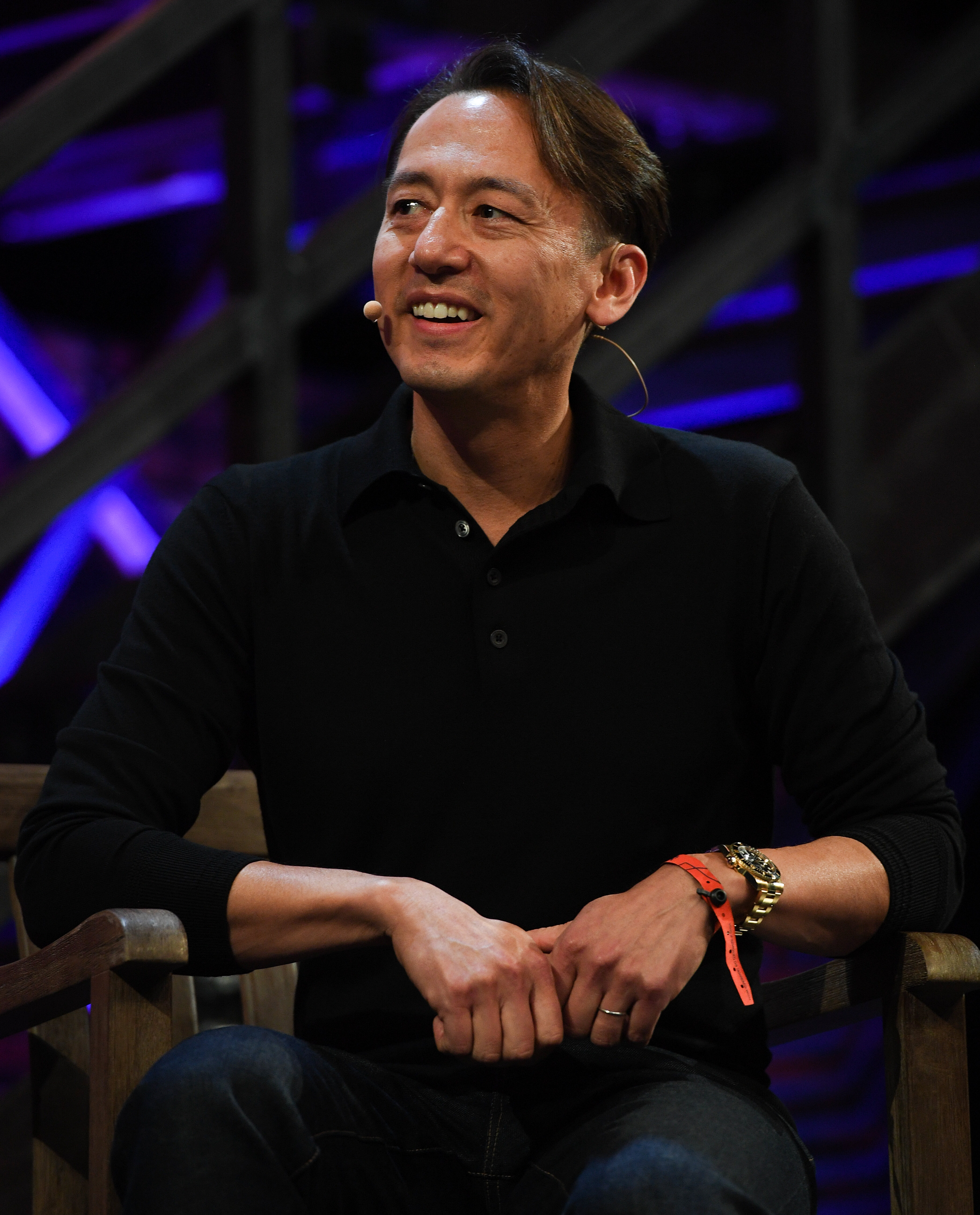
Entrepreneur Ben Chestnut

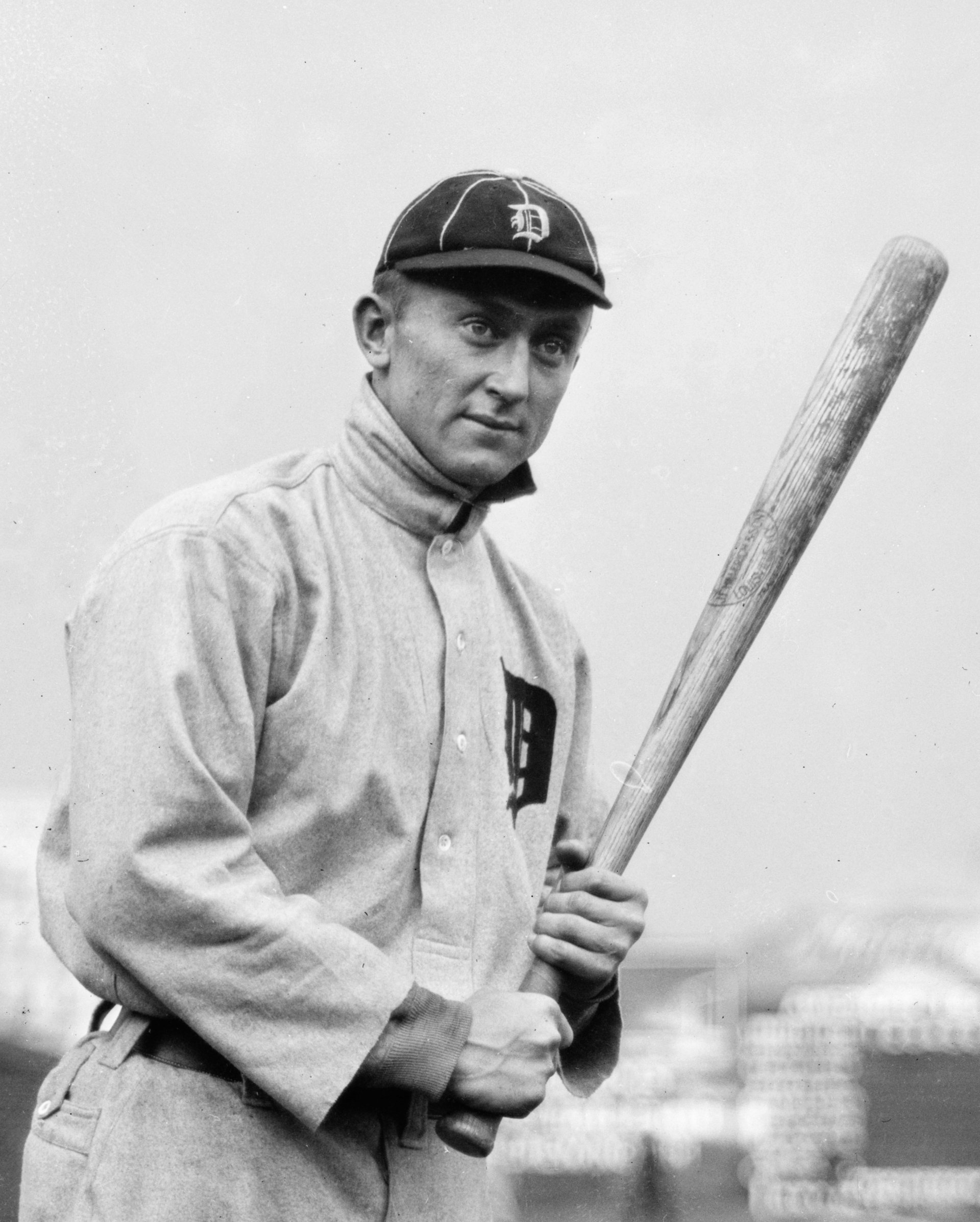
Baseball player Ty Cobb

- Devontae Cacok, basketball player
- Herman Cain, politician
- Lorenzo Cain, baseball player
- Craig Campbell, singer
- Mike Cameron, baseball player
- Asa Griggs Candler, businessman; mayor of Atlanta
- Matt Capps, baseball player
- Jaime Cardriche, actor
- Jean Carne, singer
- James Carpenter, football player
- Anthony Carter, basketball player; born in Wisconsin
- Jimmy Carter, governor of Georgia; 39th president of the United States
- Joelle Carter, model
- Lorenzo Carter, football player
- Robert Carter (born 1994), basketball player in the Israeli Basketball Premier League
- Rosalynn Carter, First Lady of the United States
- Playboi Carti, rapper
- Ken Carson, rapper
- S. Truett Cathy, founder of Chick-fil-A
- Michael Catt, clergyman
- Ahmad Caver (born 1996), basketball player in the Israeli Basketball Premier League
- Dylan Cease (born 1995), Major League Baseball pitcher
- The Lady Chablis, Savannah personality; born in Florida
- Hosea Chanchez, actor; born in Alabama
- Kyle Chandler, actor; born in New York
- Spud Chandler, baseball player
- Mark David Chapman, convicted murderer; born in Texas
- Matt and Mike Chapman; animators and voice actors; born in Indiana
- Ray Charles, singer
- Ben Chestnut, entrepreneur
- Ciara (Ciara Harris), singer, model
- Pap Chanel, rapper
- Tashard Choice, football player
- Clairo, singer
- Chris Clemons, football player
- Chuggaaconroy, Internet personality and Let's Player; born in Arizona
- Howell Cobb, governor of Georgia; U.S. secretary of treasury; speaker of the United States House of Representatives
- Ty Cobb, baseball player
- Charles Coburn, actor
- Jackie Cochran, musician
- Erle Cocke Jr. (1921–2000), 33rd National Commander of the American Legion
- Justin Coleman, football player
- Kevin Cone, football player
- Chris Conley, football player; born in Turkey
- Frances Conroy, actress
- Pat Conroy, author
- Clay Cook, songwriter
- Jared Cook, football player; born in Alabama
- Alfred Corn, poet
- Ida Cox, singer
- Michael Cranford, software engineer
- Harry Crews, author
- Charles Crisp, U.S. representative; born in England
- Javaris Crittenton, basketball player
- David Cross, actor
- Curtis Crowe, drummer
- Charlie Culberson, baseball player
- Brandon Cumpton, baseball player
- Jermaine Cunningham, football player; born in New York City
- Billy Currington, musician
- Bill Curry, football player, coach
- Michael Curry, basketball player; born in Alabama

== D ==
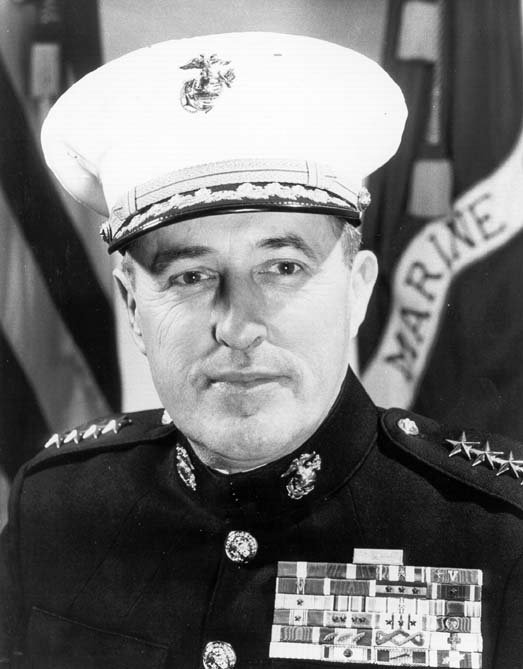
Raymond Gilbert Davis, highly decorated United States Marine Corps general who served in the Pacific, Korean, and Vietnam Wars

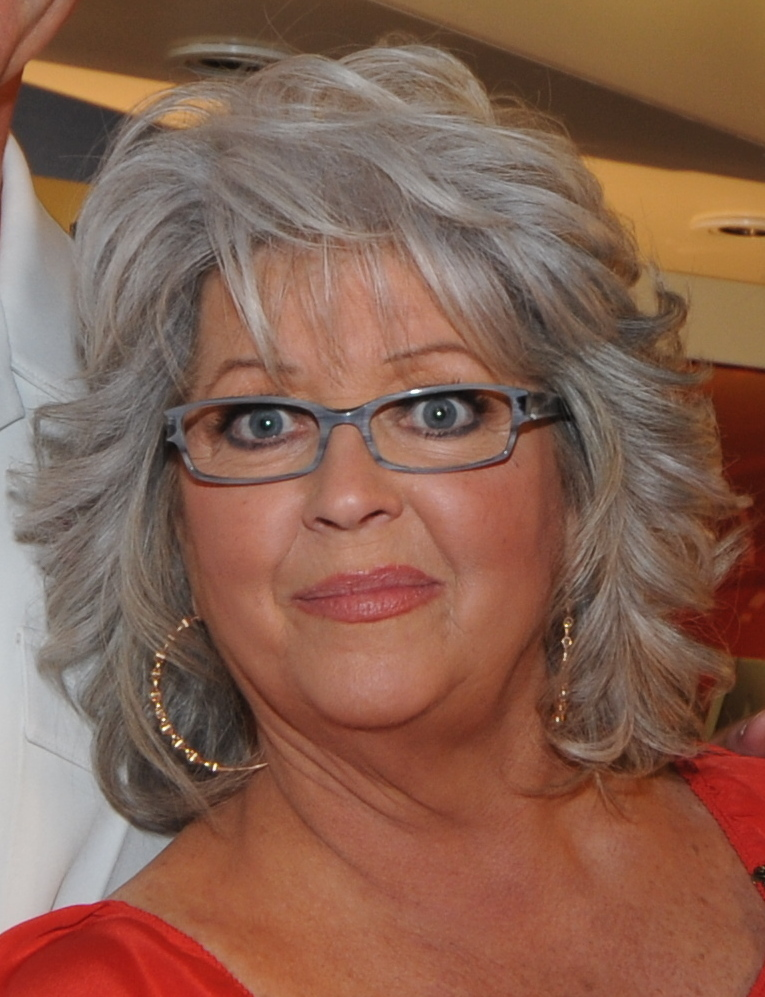
Cook and television personality Paula Deen

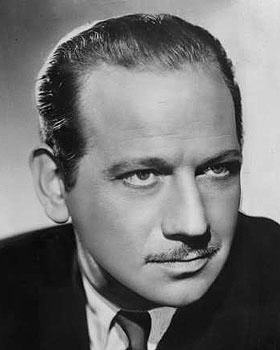
Actor Melvyn Douglas

- Jeff Daniels, actor
- Druski, comedian; born in Maryland
- Elizabeth Otis Dannelly, poet
- Patrika Darbo, actress; born in Florida
- Kyle Davies, baseball player
- Austin Davis, football player
- Brianne Davis, actress
- Geremy Davis, football player
- Jack Davis, cartoonist
- Jamin Davis, football player
- Ossie Davis, actor
- Raymond Gilbert Davis, Korean War Medal of Honor recipient
- Thomas Davis, football player
- Troy Davis, convicted murderer
- William Crosby Dawson, judge
- Diana DeGarmo, singer
- Paula Deen, chef and television personality
- Paul Delaney (born 1986), basketball player in the Israeli National League
- Akeem Dent, football player
- Bucky Dent, baseball player
- Richard Dent, football player
- Delino DeShields Jr., baseball player; born in Maryland
- Noureen DeWulf, actress
- James Dickey, author and poet
- Lella A. Dillard, temperance leader
- Marcus Dixon, football player
- Demarcus Dobbs, football player
- Amanda Doherty, golfer
- Gigi Dolin, professional wrestler
- Creflo Dollar, televangelist
- Tommy Dorfman, actress
- Melvyn Douglas, actor
- Toney Douglas, basketball player
- Kenyan Drake, football player
- J. D. Drew, baseball player
- Stephen Drew, baseball player
- Jermaine Dupri, music producer
- William DuVall, musician
- Jonathan Dwyer, football player
- Pat Dye, football coach

== E ==
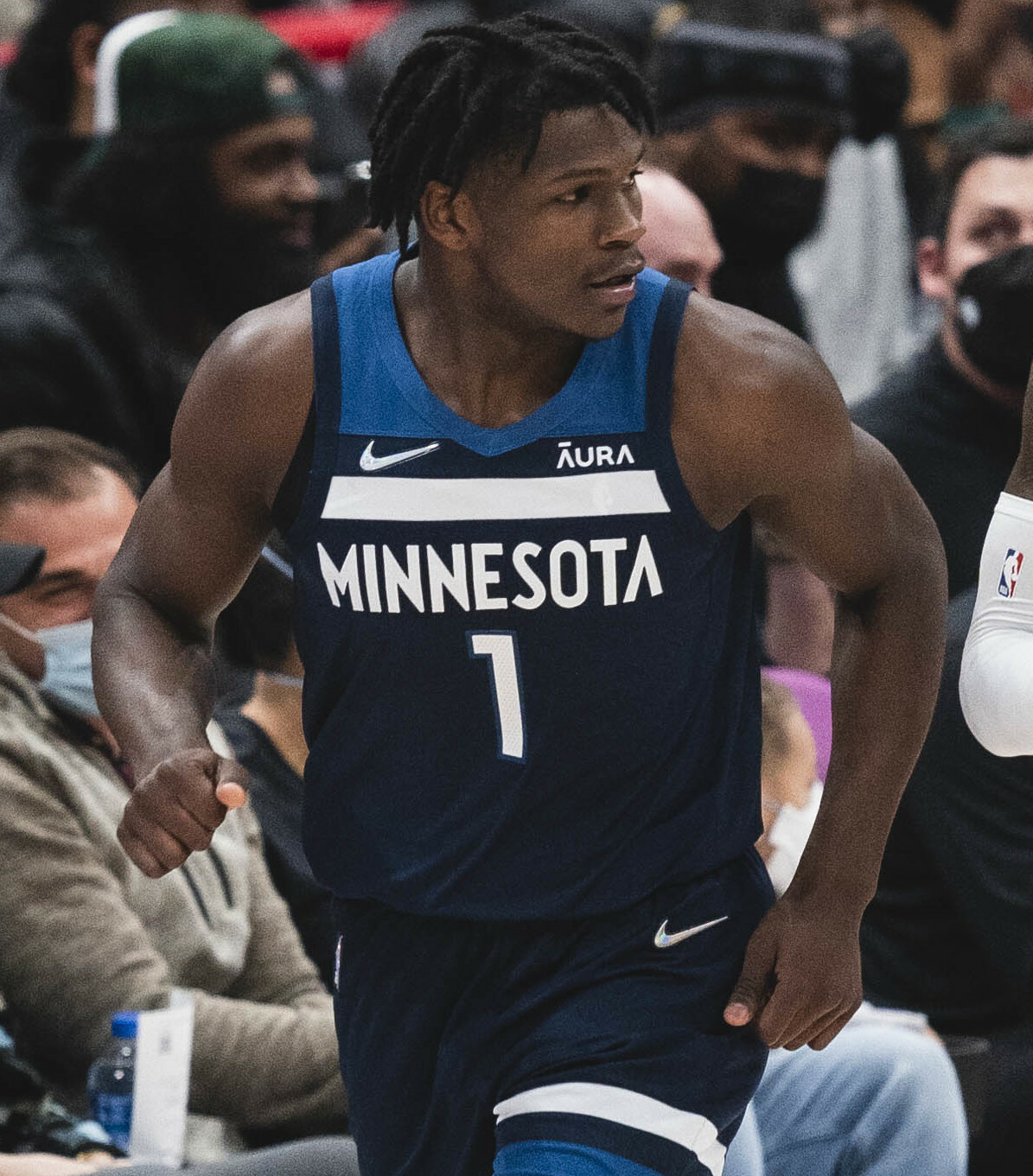
Basketball player Anthony Edwards

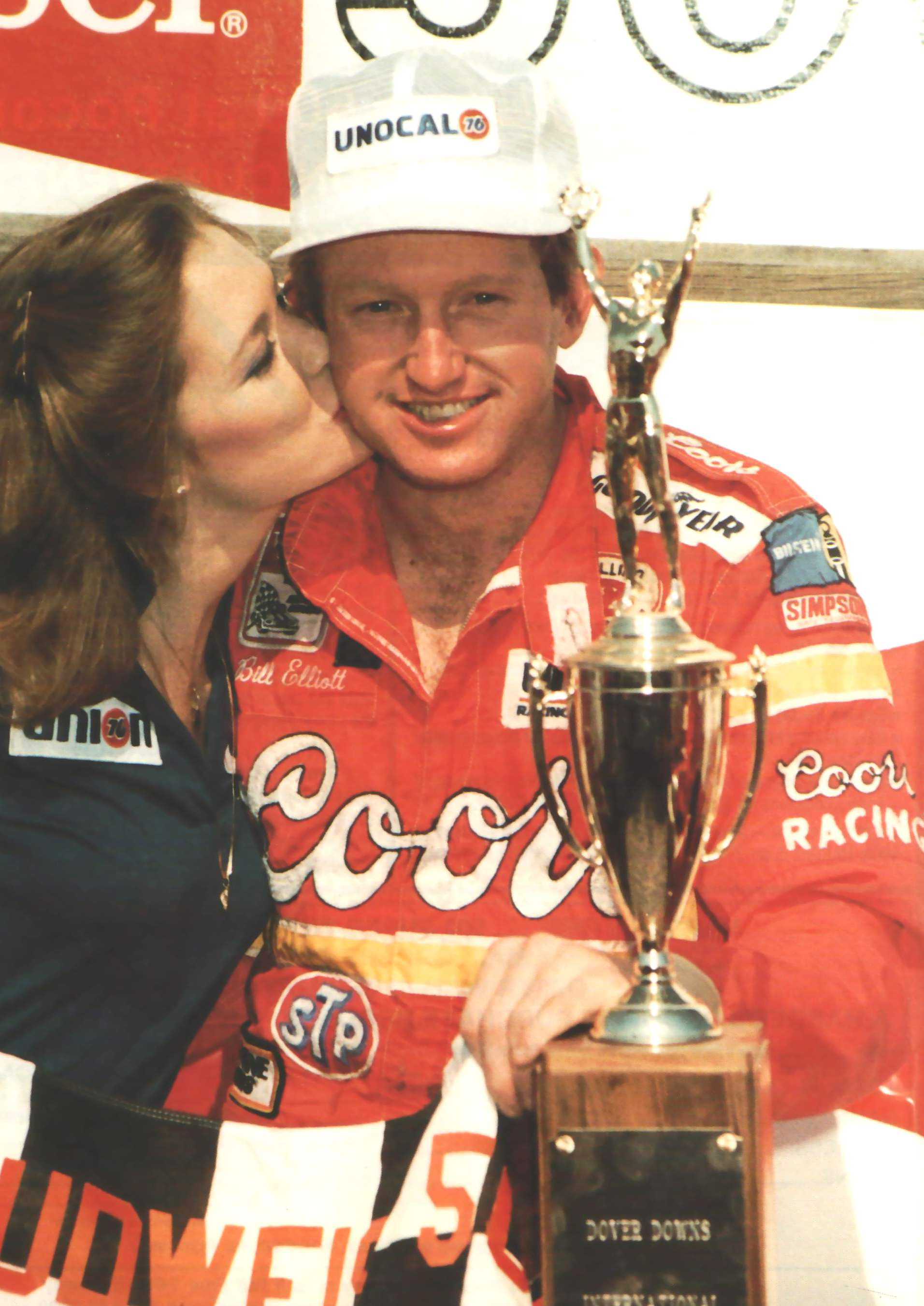
NASCAR driver Bill Elliott

- Bobbie Eakes, actress
- Nick Eason, professional football defensive end
- Anthony Edwards, basketball player
- Sam Edwards, actor
- Teresa Edwards, basketball player
- Terrence Edwards, Canadian football player
- Jason Elam, professional football placekicker; born in Florida
- eLDee, musician, record label executive
- Chase Elliott, NASCAR driver
- Bill Elliott, NASCAR driver
- Jeri Ellsworth, computer chip designer
- Corri English, actress
- Ellia English, actress
- Evan Engram, professional football player
- Mike Erwin, actor
- Clement A. Evans, Civil War general
- Maria Louise Eve, poet
- Adam Everett, former MLB shortstop

== F ==
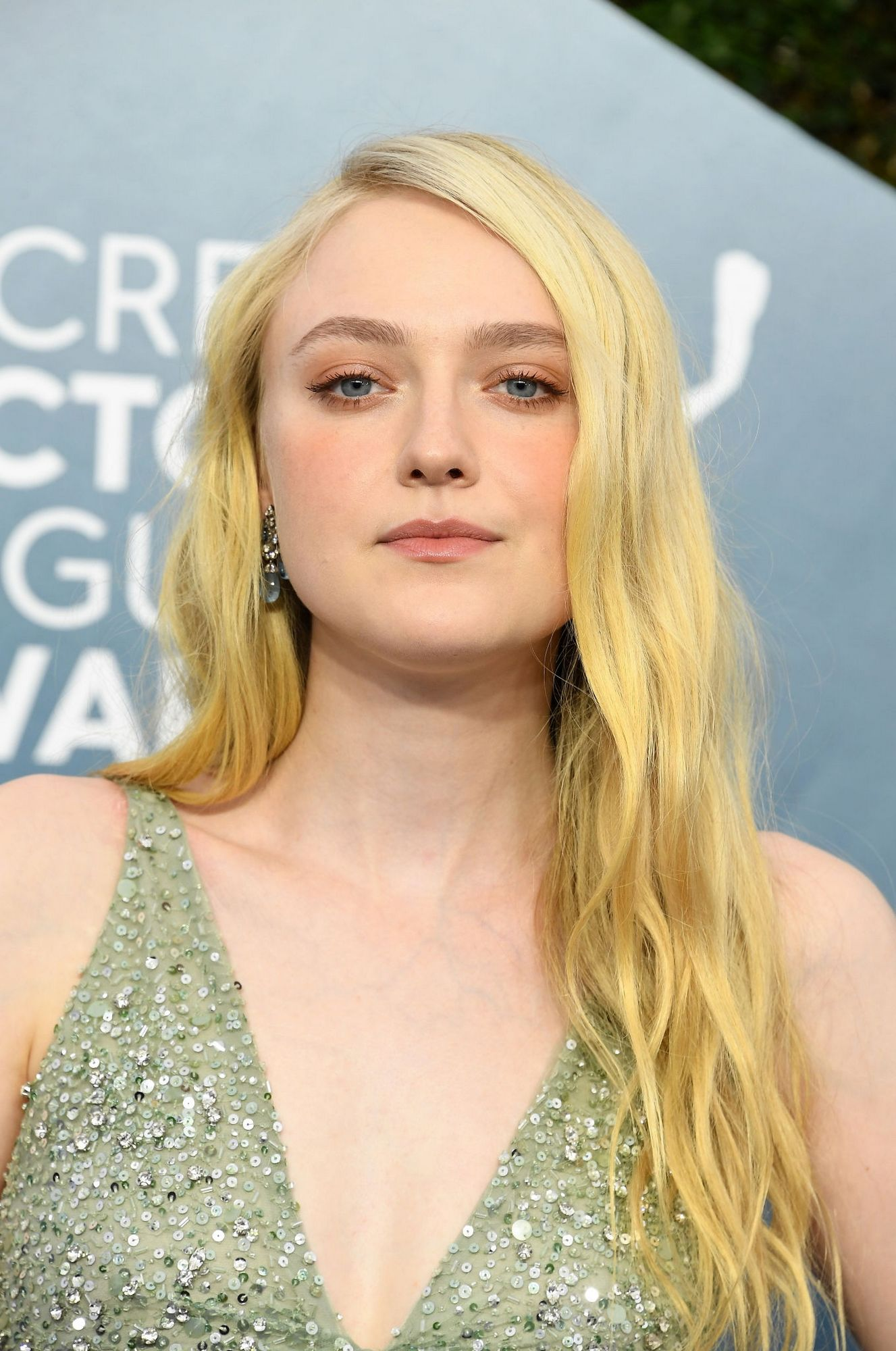
Actress Dakota Fanning

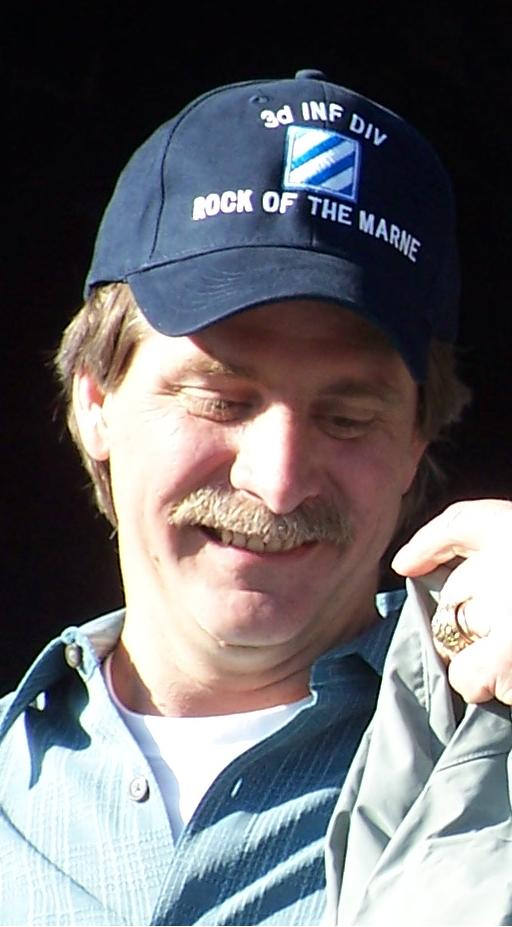
Comedian and actor Jeff Foxworthy

- Dakota Fanning, actress
- Elle Fanning, actress
- Kyle Farnsworth, baseball player; born in Kansas
- Harris Faulkner, television personality
- Derrick Favors, basketball player
- Jennifer Ferrin, actress
- William Few, politician, founding father
- Josh Fields, baseball player
- Chone Figgins, baseball player
- Howard Finster, minister
- Laurence Fishburne, actor
- Anthony Fisher (born 1986), basketball player in the Israeli Basketball Premier League
- Tyler Flowers, baseball player
- Pretty Boy Floyd, bank robber
- Andre Fluellen, football player; born in Pennsylvania
- Tom Foley, baseball player
- Colt Ford, musician
- Ira Roe Foster, soldier and politician; born in South Carolina
- Dexter Fowler, baseball player
- Keyaron Fox, football player
- Rachel G. Fox, actress
- Jeff Foxworthy, comedian
- Jeff Francoeur, baseball player
- Clint Frazier, baseball player
- Walt Frazier, basketball player
- Devonta Freeman, football player
- John C. Fremont, explorer, politician
- Future, rapper

== G ==
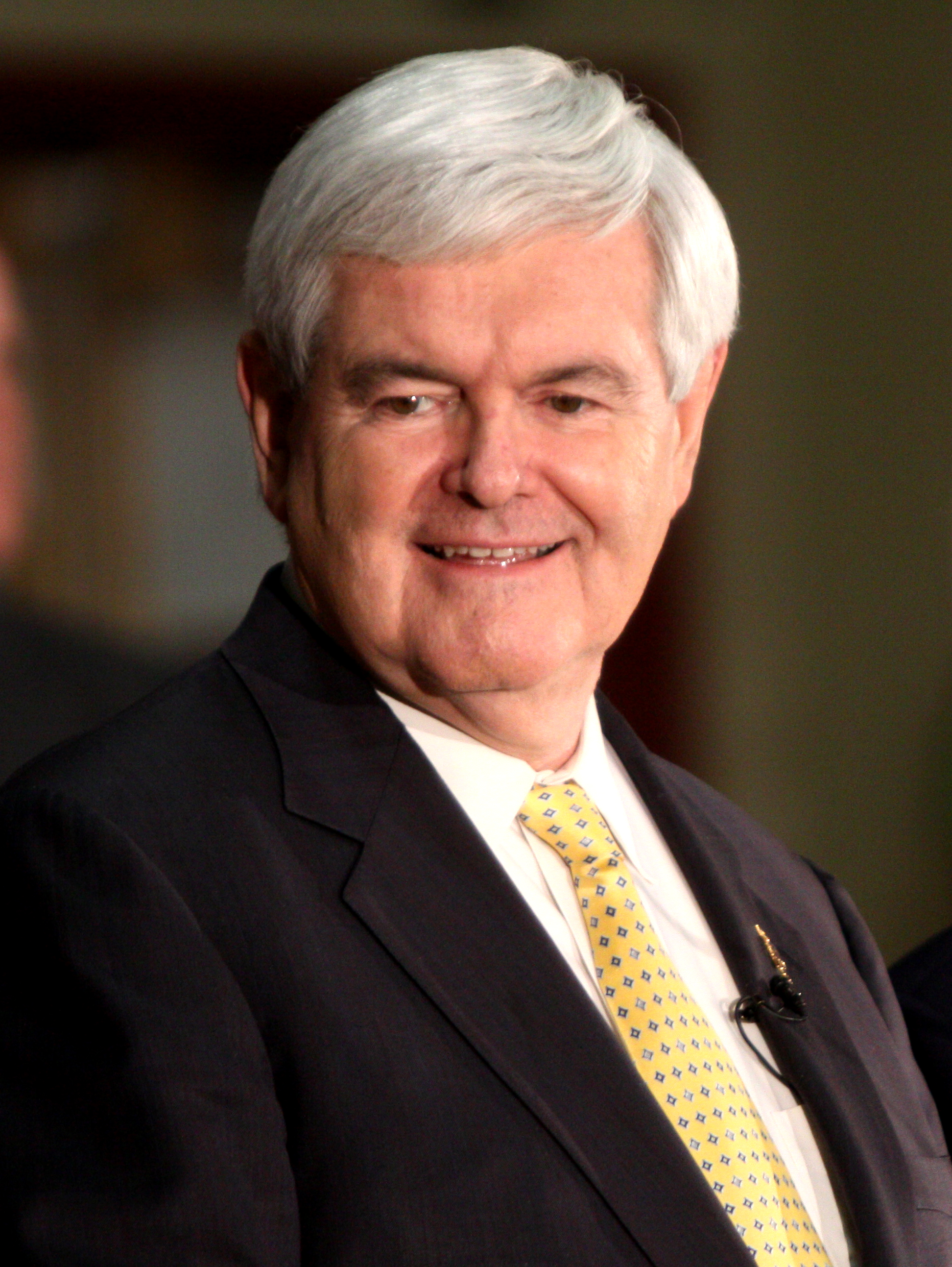
Politician Newt Gingrich

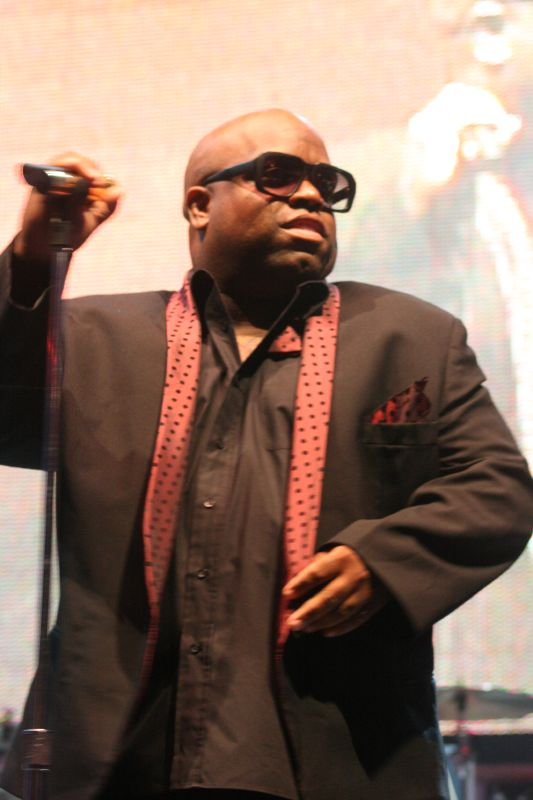
Musician Cee Lo Green

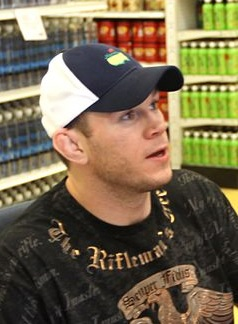
MMA fighter Forrest Griffin

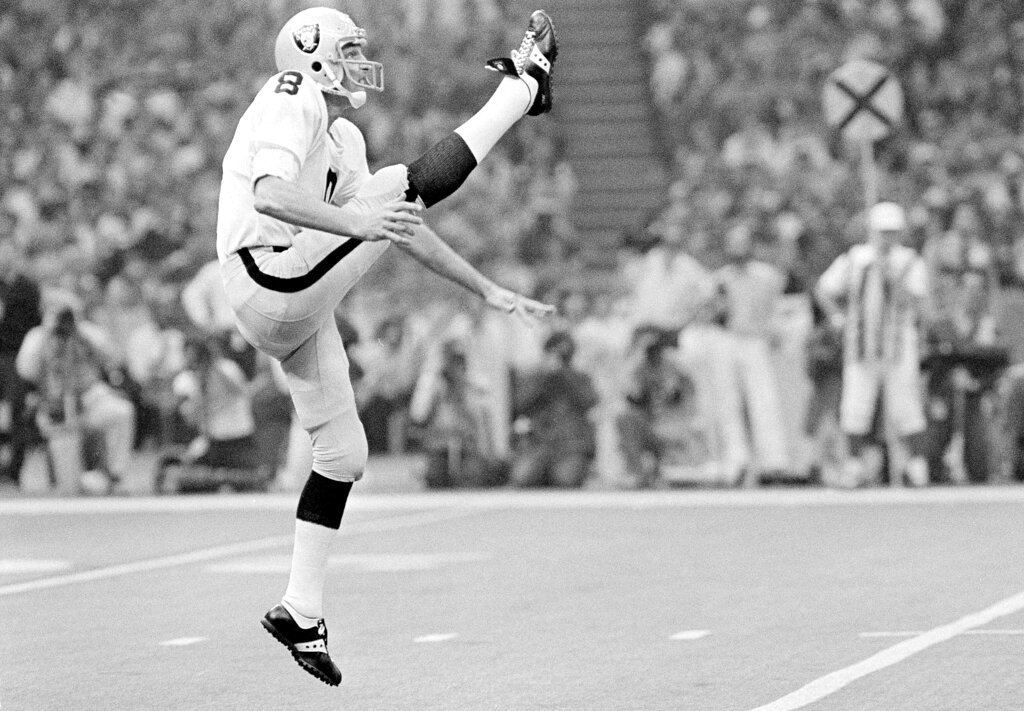
Football player Ray Guy

- Kap G (born 1994), rapper and actor
- Boyd Gaines (born 1953), actor
- Michael Gallup, NFL football player
- Darryl Gamble, NFL football player
- JaKeenan Gant (born 1996), basketball player for Hapoel Be'er Sheva of the Israeli Basketball Premier League
- John Gant, Major League Baseball player
- Max Garcia, football player
- Andrew Gardner, NFL football player
- Willie Gault, NFL football player
- Shanequa Gay, visual artist
- Antonia Gentry, actress
- Josh Gibson, baseball player
- Kelli Giddish, actress
- Brantley Gilbert, singer
- Kevin Gillespie, chef, restaurateur, and author
- Newt Gingrich, politician, historian, former speaker of the House, and presidential candidate
- De'Mon Glanton, football player
- Cordy Glenn, football player
- Donald Glover, actor and rapper; born in California
- Jonathan Goff, football player
- Walton Goggins, actor; born in Alabama
- Kedric Golston, NFL football player
- John Brown Gordon, Civil War general
- Marianne Gordon, actress
- Terrance Gore, baseball player
- Andrew Goudelock, basketball player
- Joyce Grable, professional wrestler
- Nancy Grace, television personality
- Amy Grant, singer
- Deon Grant, NFL football player
- Cee Lo Green, singer
- Willie Green, NFL football player
- Kevin Greenaugh, scientist
- Nathanael Greene, American Revolutionary War general
- James Gregory, comedian
- Simone Griffeth, actress
- Forrest Griffin, mixed martial artist; born in Ohio
- Marquis Grissom, baseball player
- Lewis Grizzard, writer
- Ben Grubbs, football player
- Gunna, rapper
- Jim Gurfein (born 1961), tennis player
- Jasmine Guy, actress
- Ray Guy, football player
- Gary Guyton, football player
- Myron Guyton, football player
- Button Gwinnett, 18th-century politician; born in England

== H ==
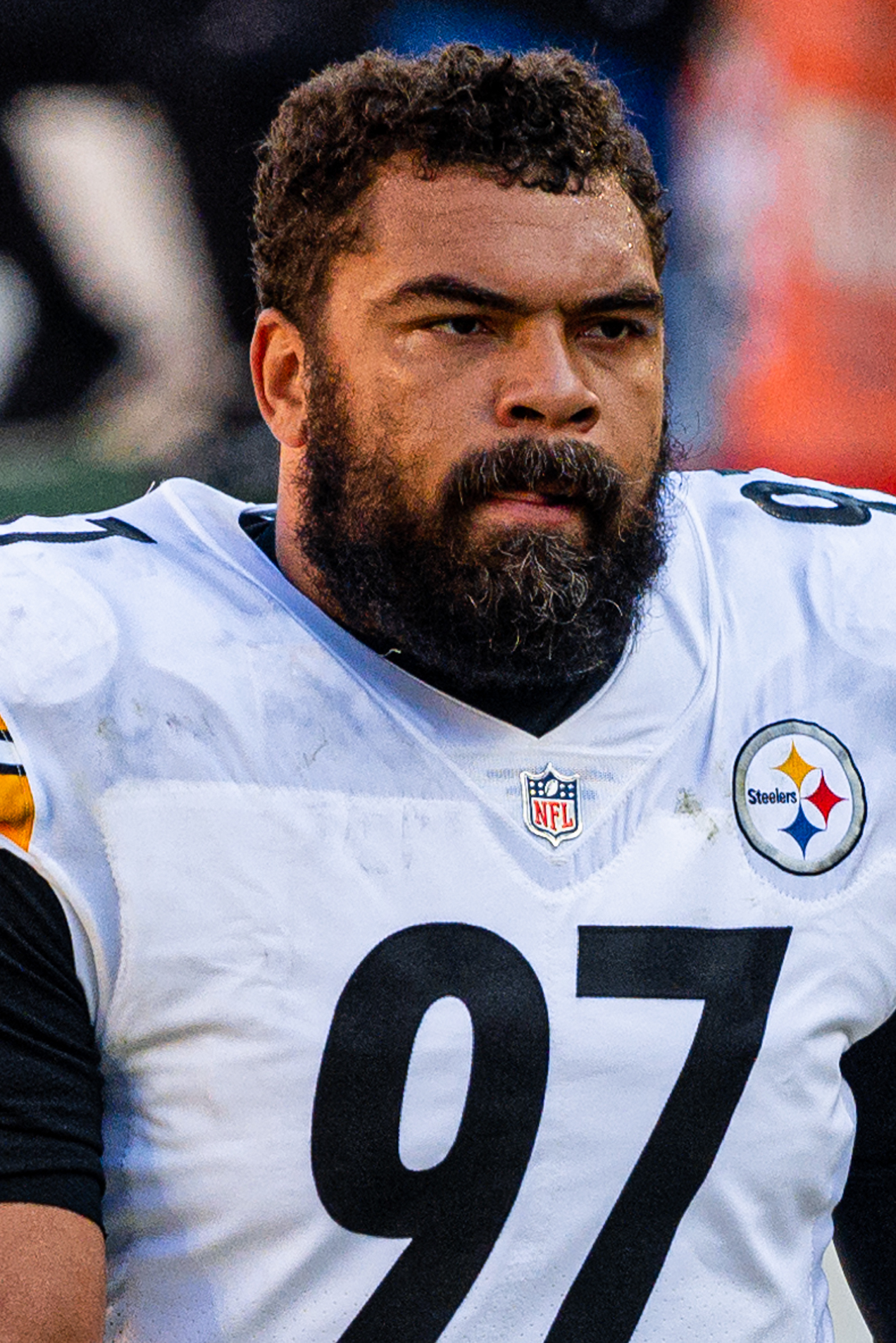
Football player Cameron Heyward

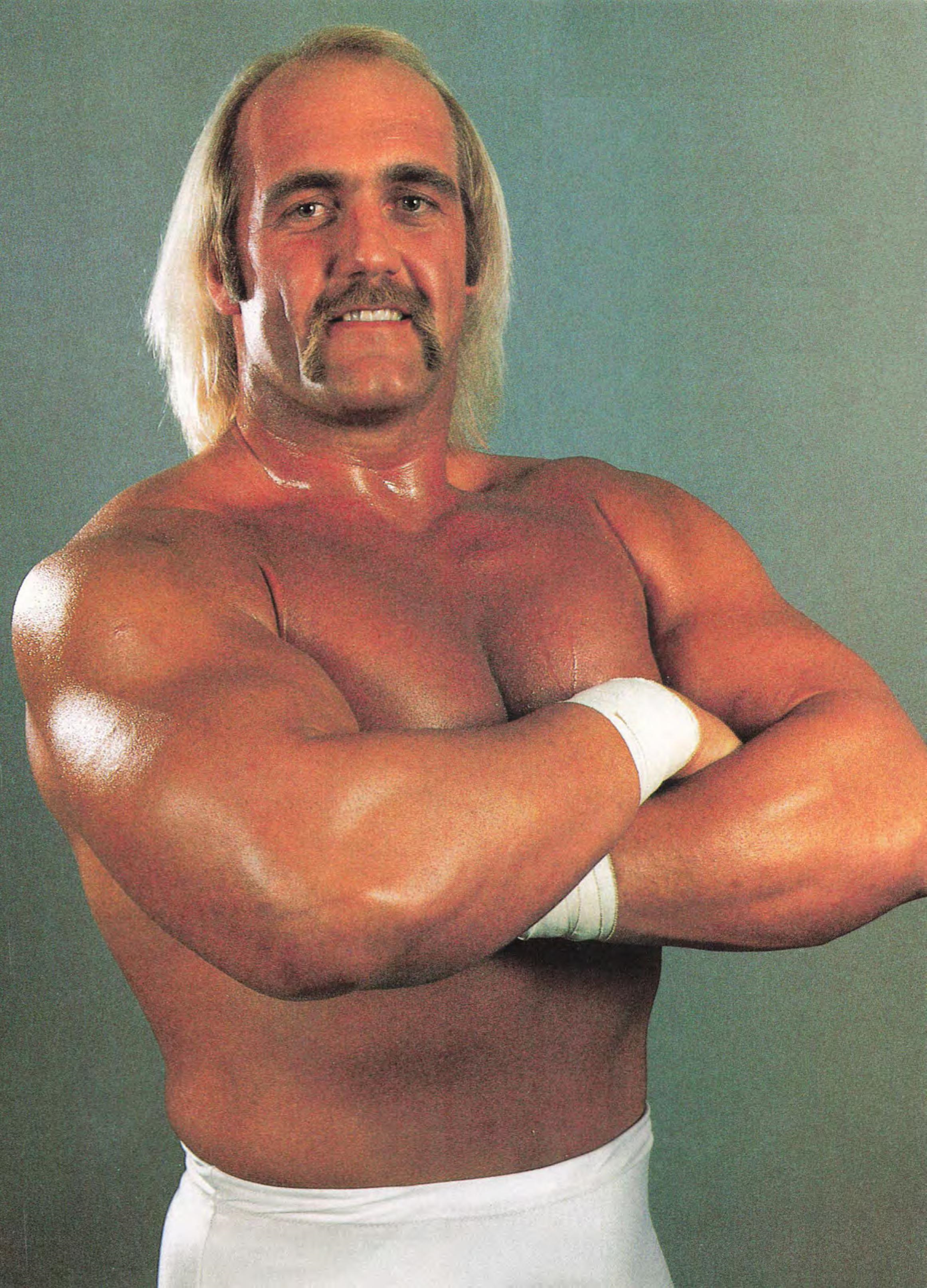
Pro Wrestler Hulk Hogan

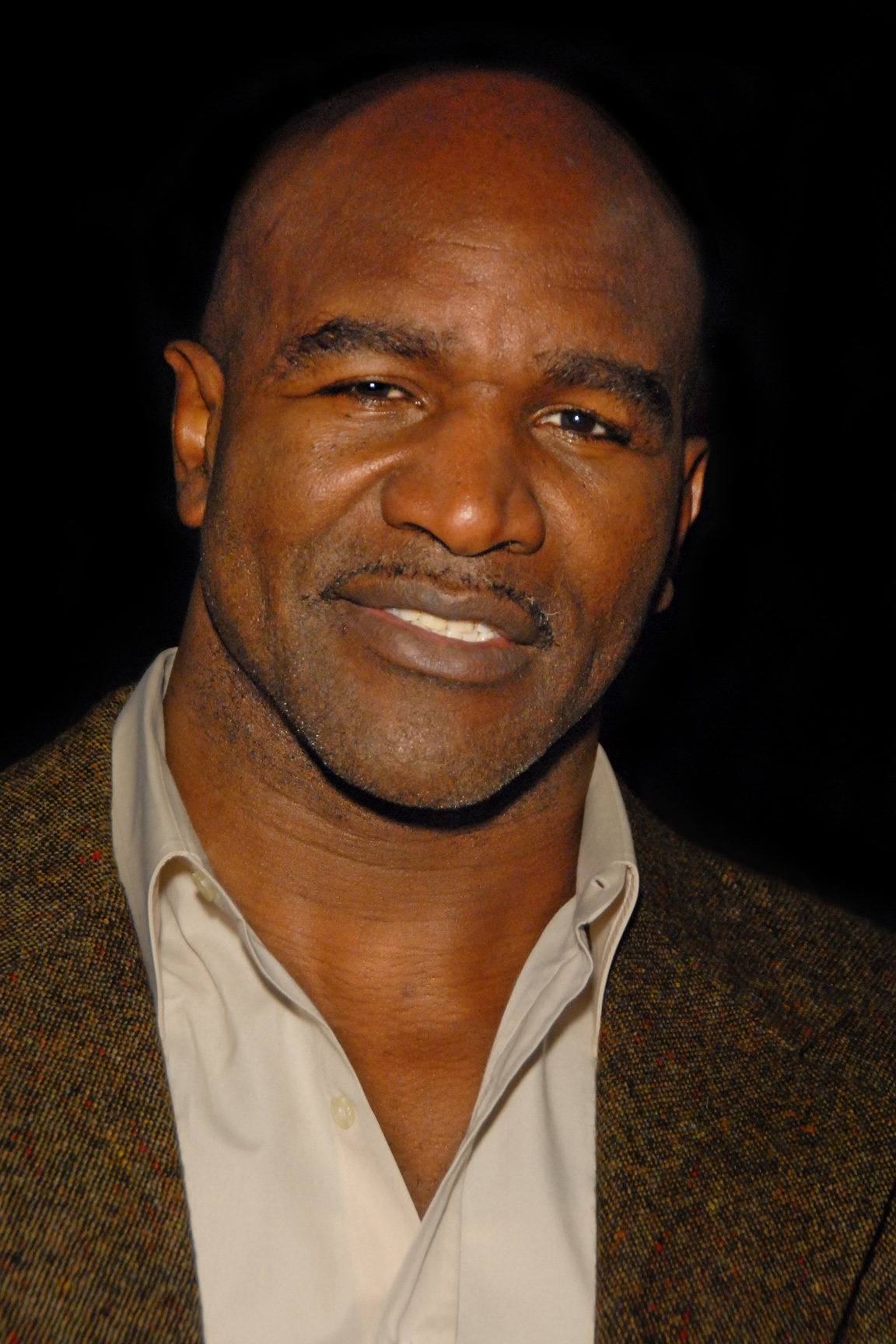
Boxer Evander Holyfield

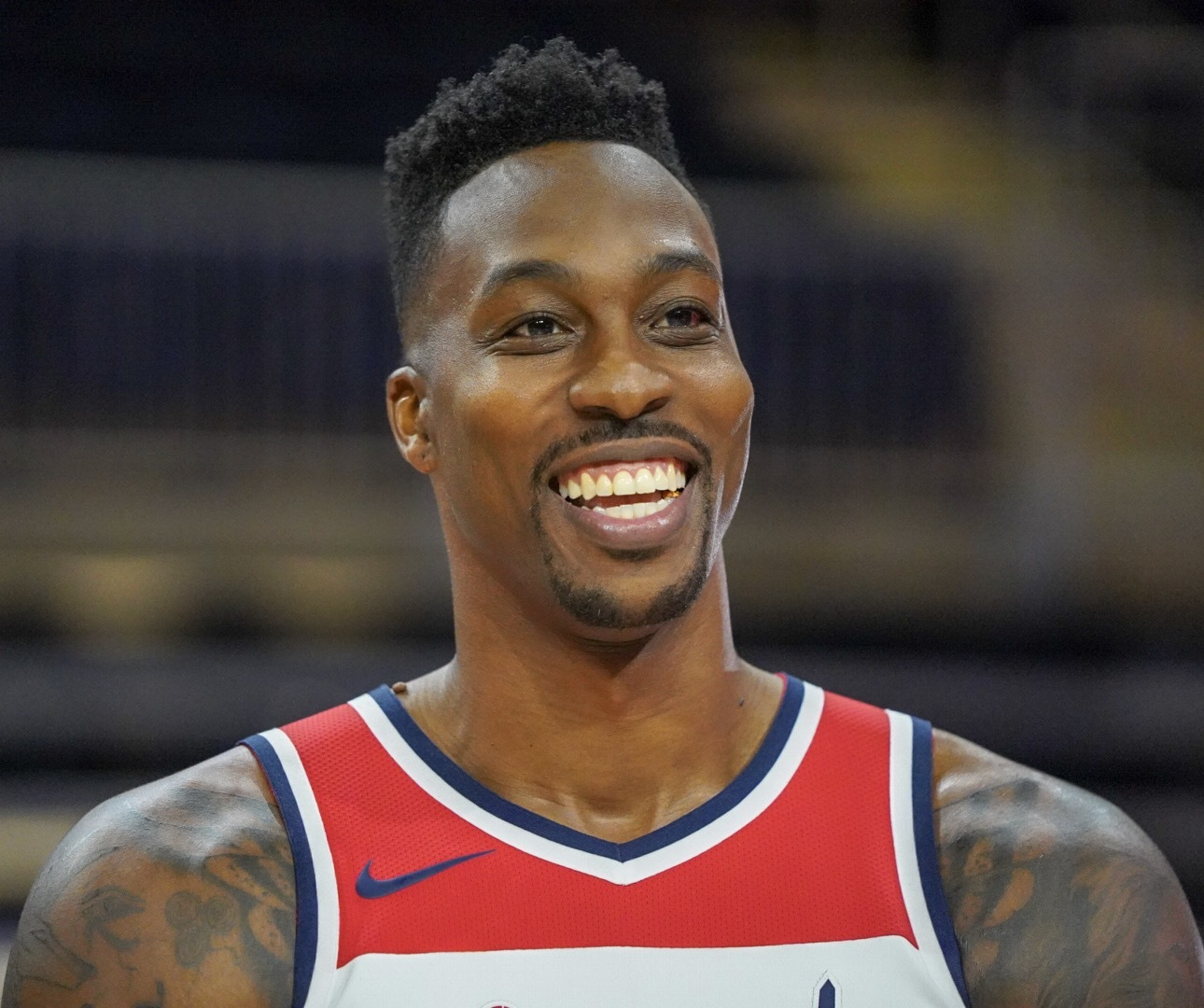
Basketball player Dwight Howard

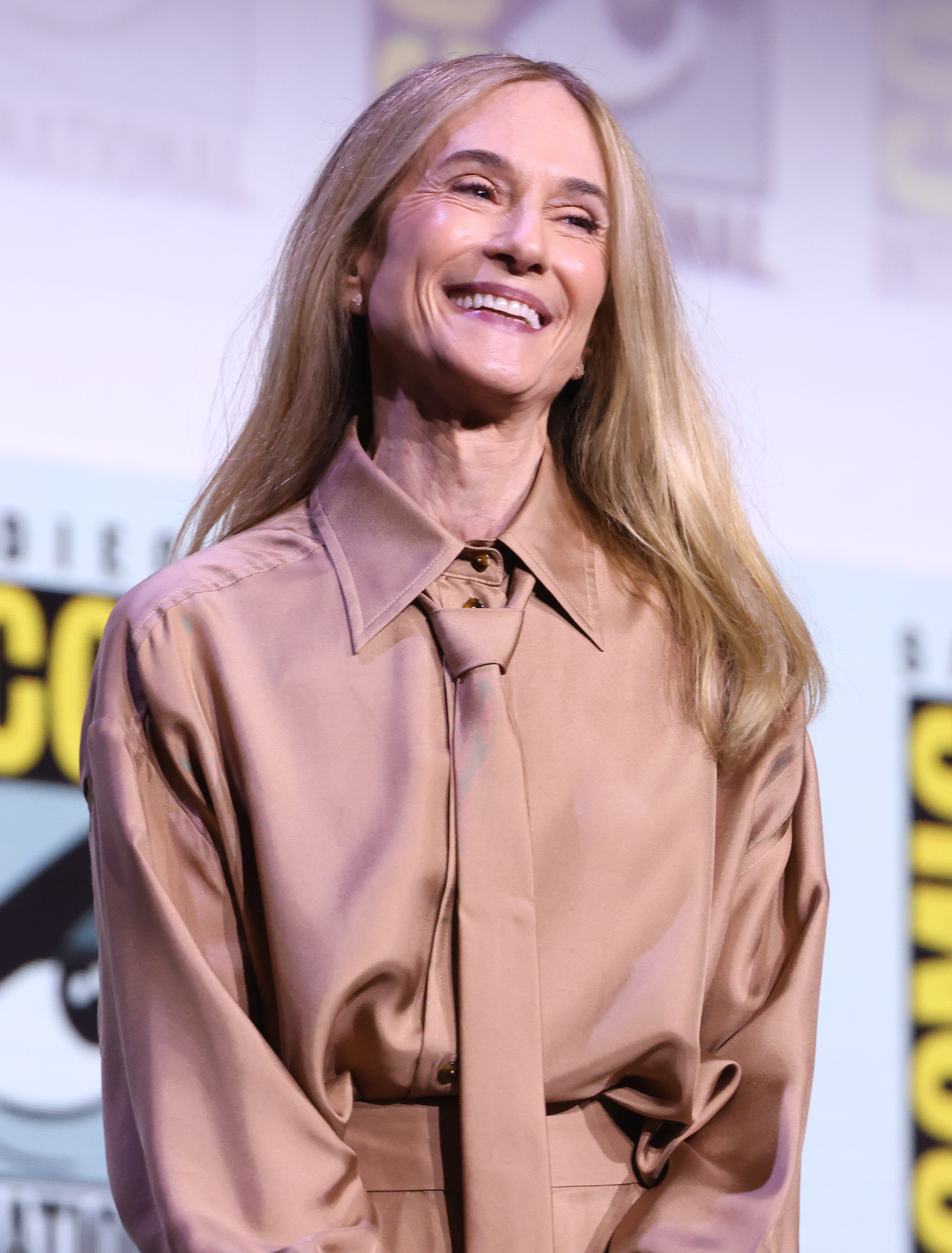
Actress Holly Hunter

- David Hale, baseball player
- Grant Haley, football player
- Todd Haley, football coach
- Chad Hall, football player
- Lyman Hall, 18th-century statesman
- Mary Crovatt Hambidge (1885–1973), artist, weaver
- Eric L. Haney, Delta Force military figure
- John Hannah, football player
- Omari Hardwick, actor
- Oliver Hardy, actor
- Gale Harold, actor
- Jared Harper (born 1997), basketball player for Hapoel Jerusalem of the Israeli Basketball Premier League
- Ken "The Hawk" Harrelson, TV announcer for the Chicago White Sox
- Desmond Harrington, actor
- Don Harris, journalist
- Dwayne Harris, football player
- Ethel Hillyer Harris, author
- Joel Chandler Harris, journalist; folklorist; wrote the collection of Uncle Remus stories
- Josh Harris, football player
- Nancy Hart, American Revolutionary War figure
- Ernie Harwell, baseball broadcaster
- Vanessa Briscoe Hay, singer
- Jarvis Hayes, basketball player
- Roland Hayes, singer
- Garrison Hearst, football player
- Lucille Hegamin, singer
- Taylor Heinicke, football player
- Will Heller, football player
- Ed Helms, actor
- Elaine Hendrix, actress
- Chas Henry, football player
- Jeremy Hermida, baseball player
- J. G. Hertzler, actor, author, screenwriter
- Clint Hester, mixed martial artist
- Cameron Heyward, football player; born in Pennsylvania
- Bill Hicks, comedian
- J. J. Hickson, basketball player
- Daniel Whitehead Hicky, poet
- Jordan Hill, basketball player
- Keri Hilson, singer
- Elijah Hirsh (born 1997), American-Israeli basketball player in the Israeli Basketball Premier League
- Hulk Hogan, wrestler and actor
- Doc Holliday, American Old West figure
- Josh Holloway, actor; model; born in California
- Sterling Holloway, actor
- Larry Holmes, boxer
- Lucius Henry Holsey, bishop
- Evander Holyfield, boxer
- Rick Honeycutt, baseball player, coach; born in Tennessee
- Jan Hooks, actress
- Miriam Hopkins, actress
- Chris Horton (born 1994), basketball player for Hapoel Tel Aviv of the Israeli Basketball Premier League
- Corinne Stocker Horton, elocutionist, journalist, newspaper editor
- Justin Houston, football player
- William Houstoun, lawyer
- Dwight Howard, basketball player
- Richard Howell (born 1990), American-Israeli basketball player in the Israeli Basketball Premier League
- Tim Hudson, baseball player
- Holly Hunter, actress
- Caleb Lee Hutchinson, singer and runner-up on American Idol's 16th season

== I ==
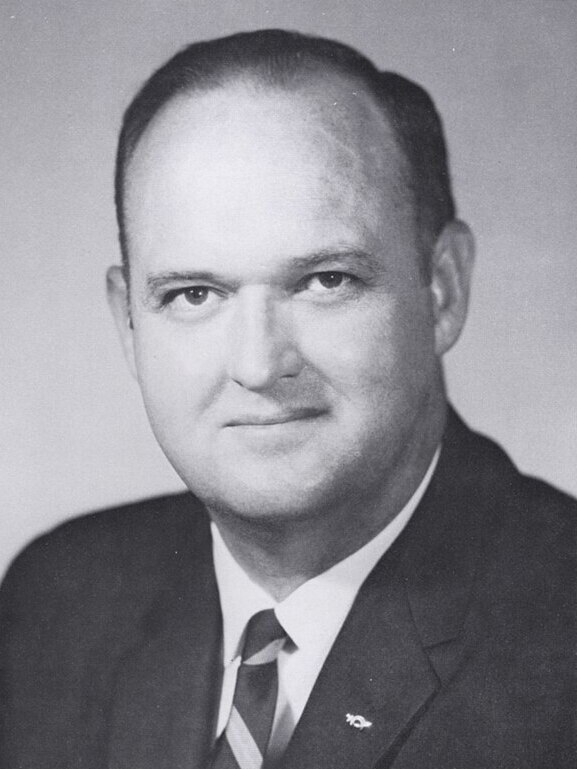
Politician Tommy Irvin

- Tommy Irvin, longest-serving state commissioner of agriculture in U.S.
- Dana Ivey, actress
- Mike Ivie, baseball player

== J ==
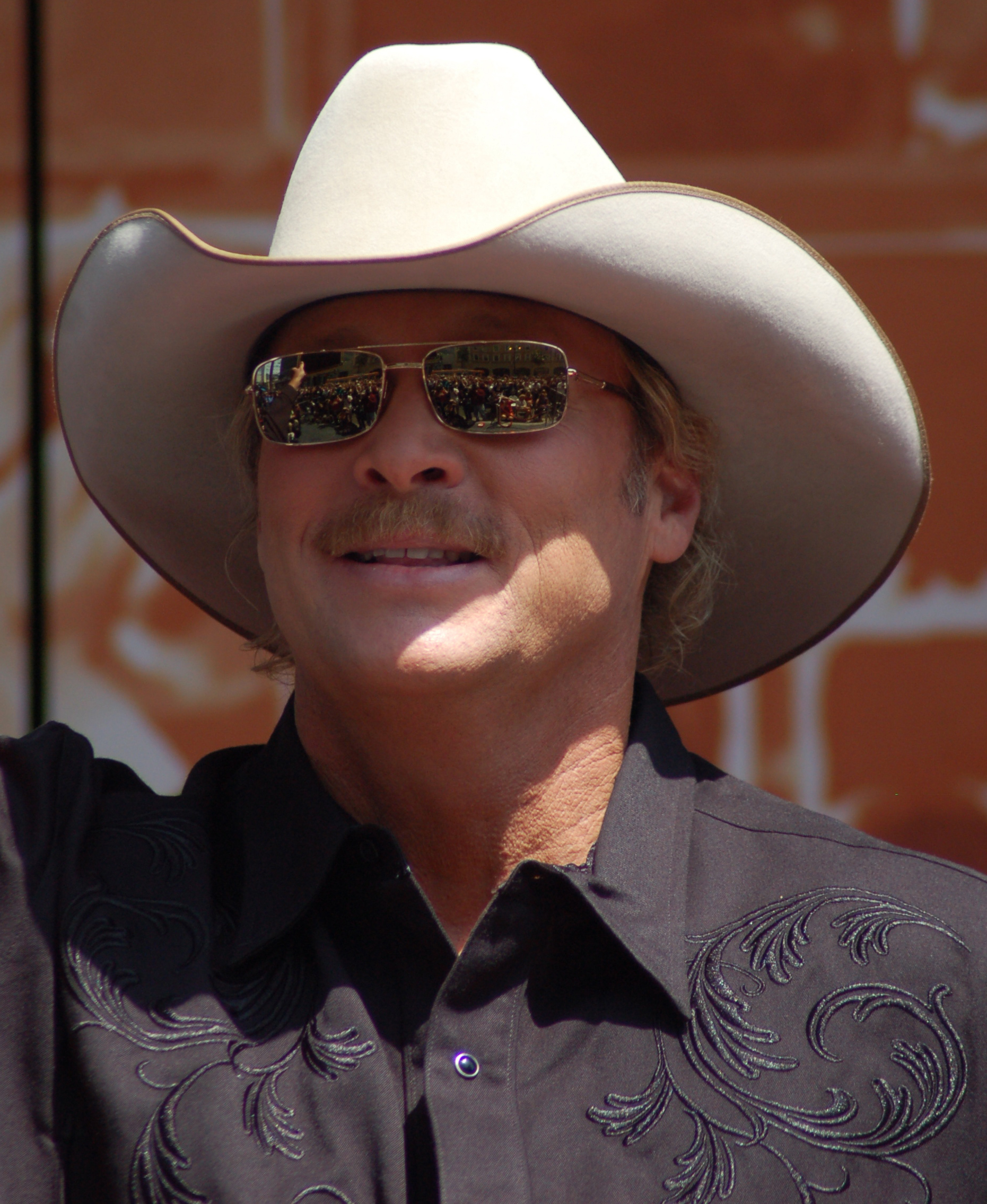
Musician Alan Jackson

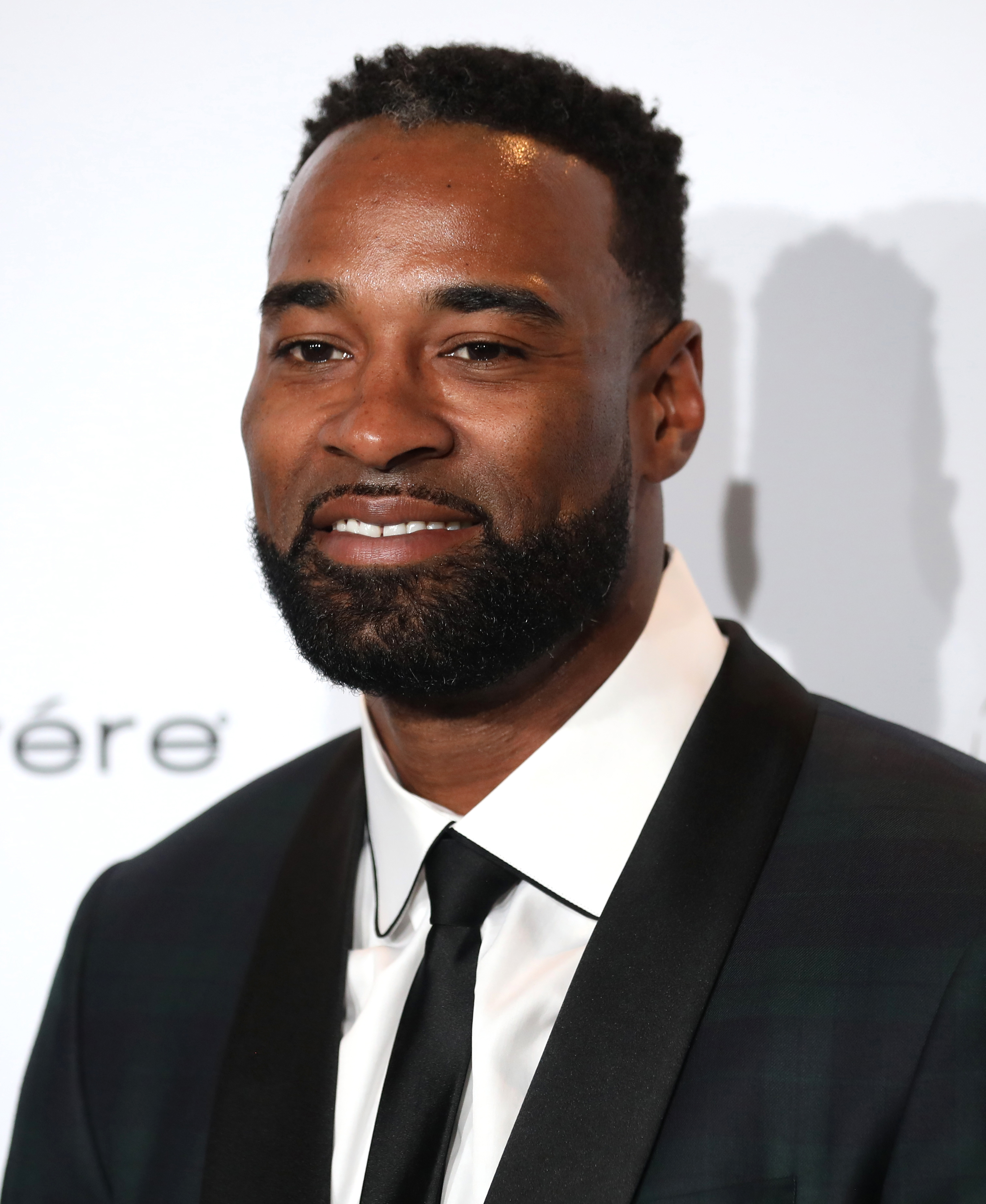
Football player Calvin Johnson

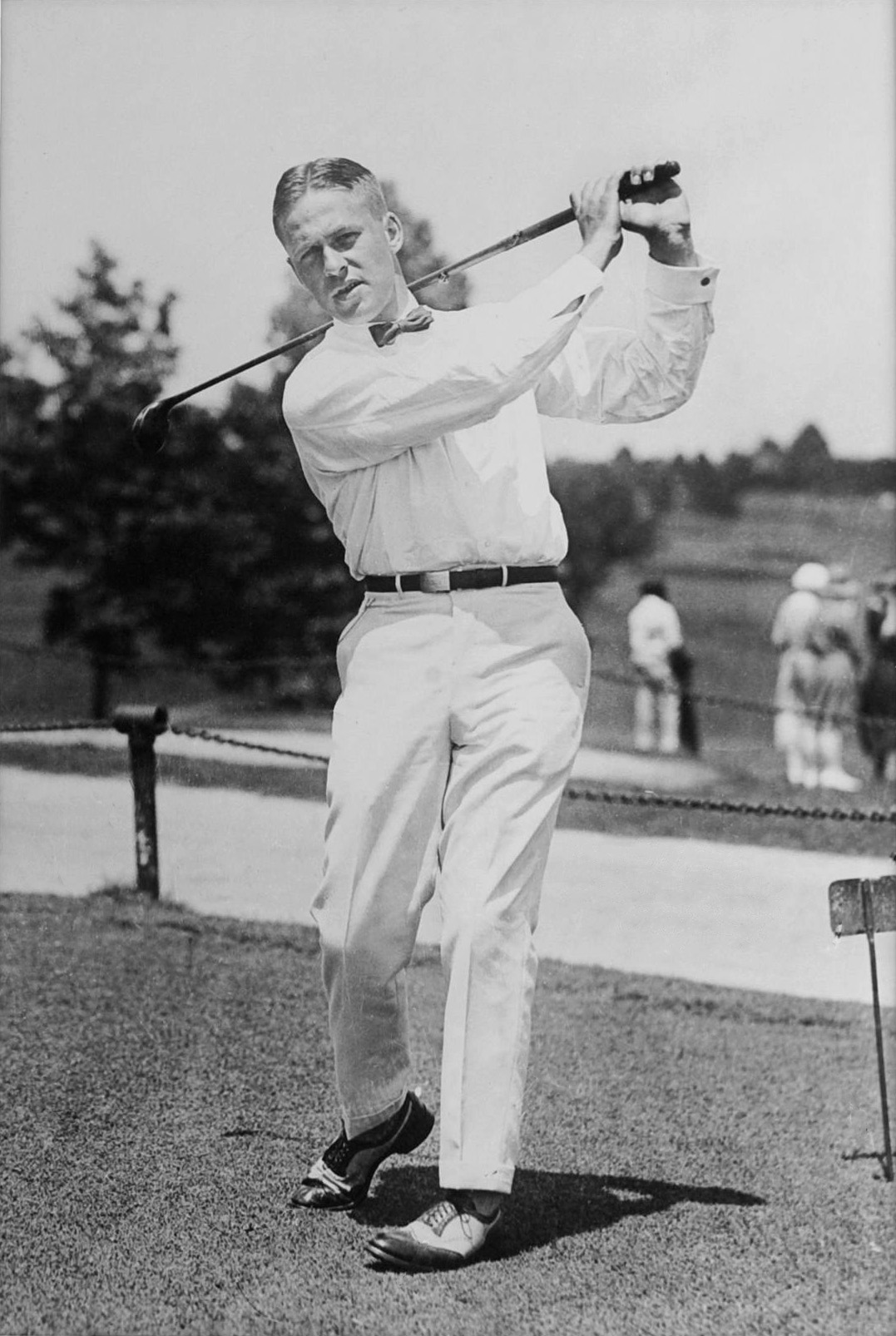
Golfer Bobby Jones

- Beau Jack, boxer
- Alan Jackson, musician
- Edwin Jackson, baseball player; born in West Germany
- Kareem Jackson, football player
- Keith Jackson, sportscaster
- Millie Jackson, singer
- Emily Jacobson (born 1985), saber fencer
- Sada Jacobson (born 1983), Olympic fencing silver and bronze medalist
- Al Jaffee, cartoonist
- Bernard James, basketball player
- Brian Girard James, professional wrestler
- Ja'Wuan James, football player
- Marty Jannetty, professional wrestler
- Grady Jarrett, football player
- Erika Jayne, performer
- E. F. Jemison, Confederate soldier
- Chad Jenkins, baseball player; born in Tennessee
- George W. Jenkins, founder of Publix
- Iris Johansen, novelist
- Broderick Johnson, film producer
- Calvin Johnson (also known as Megatron), football player
- Charles Johnson, football player
- Hall Johnson, composer, arranger
- Herschel V. Johnson, politician
- Abry Jones, football player
- Adam "Pacman" Jones, football player
- Bessie Jones, singer
- Bobby Jones, golfer
- Chipper Jones, baseball player
- Chris Jones, football player
- Jonathan Jones, football player
- Nick Jones, football player
- Reshad Jones, football player
- Sean Jones, football player
- Ronald Jones II college football player, USC Trojans
- Benn Jordan, electronic musician
- Wally Joyner, baseball player

== K ==
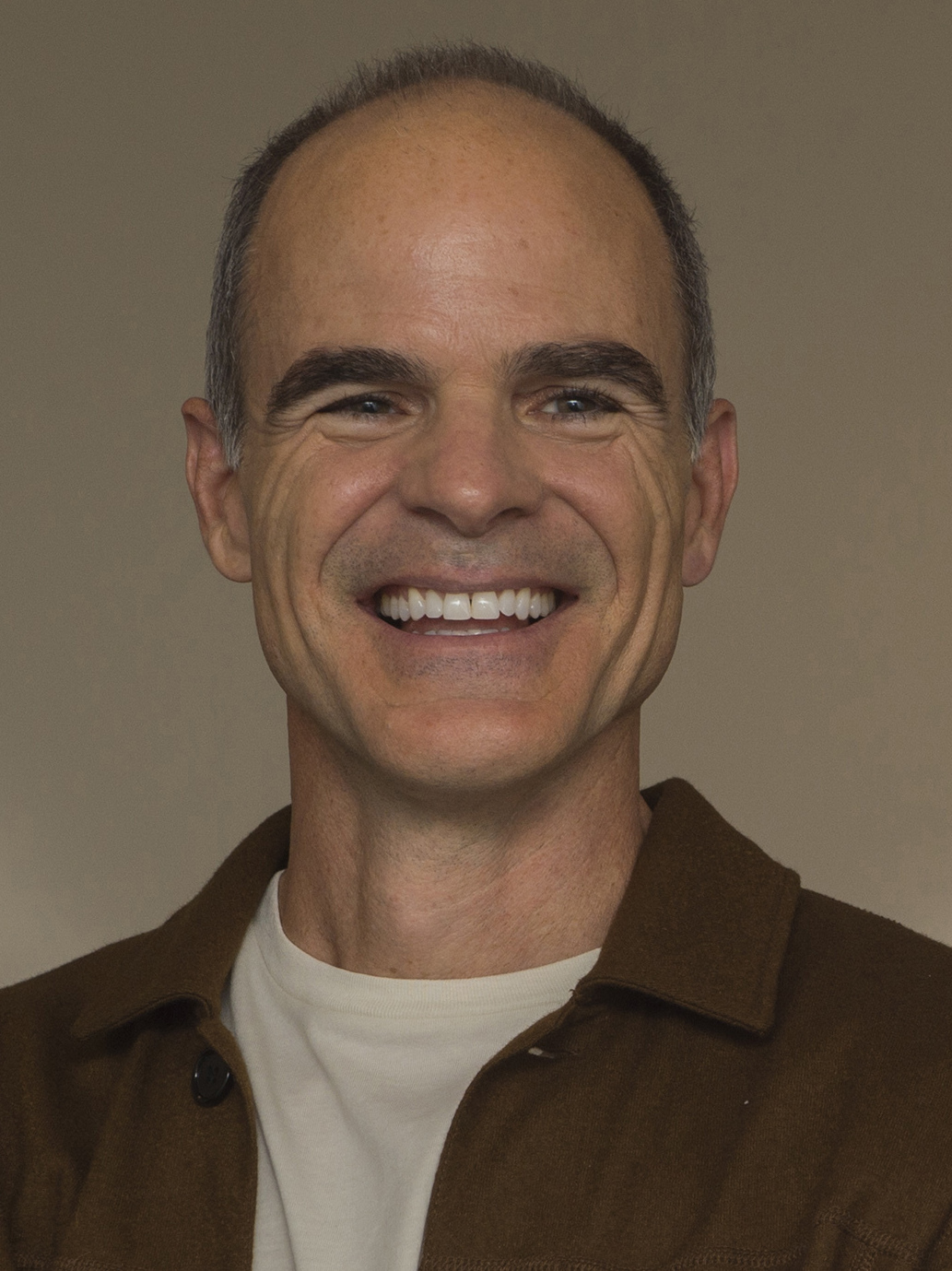
Actor Michael Kelly

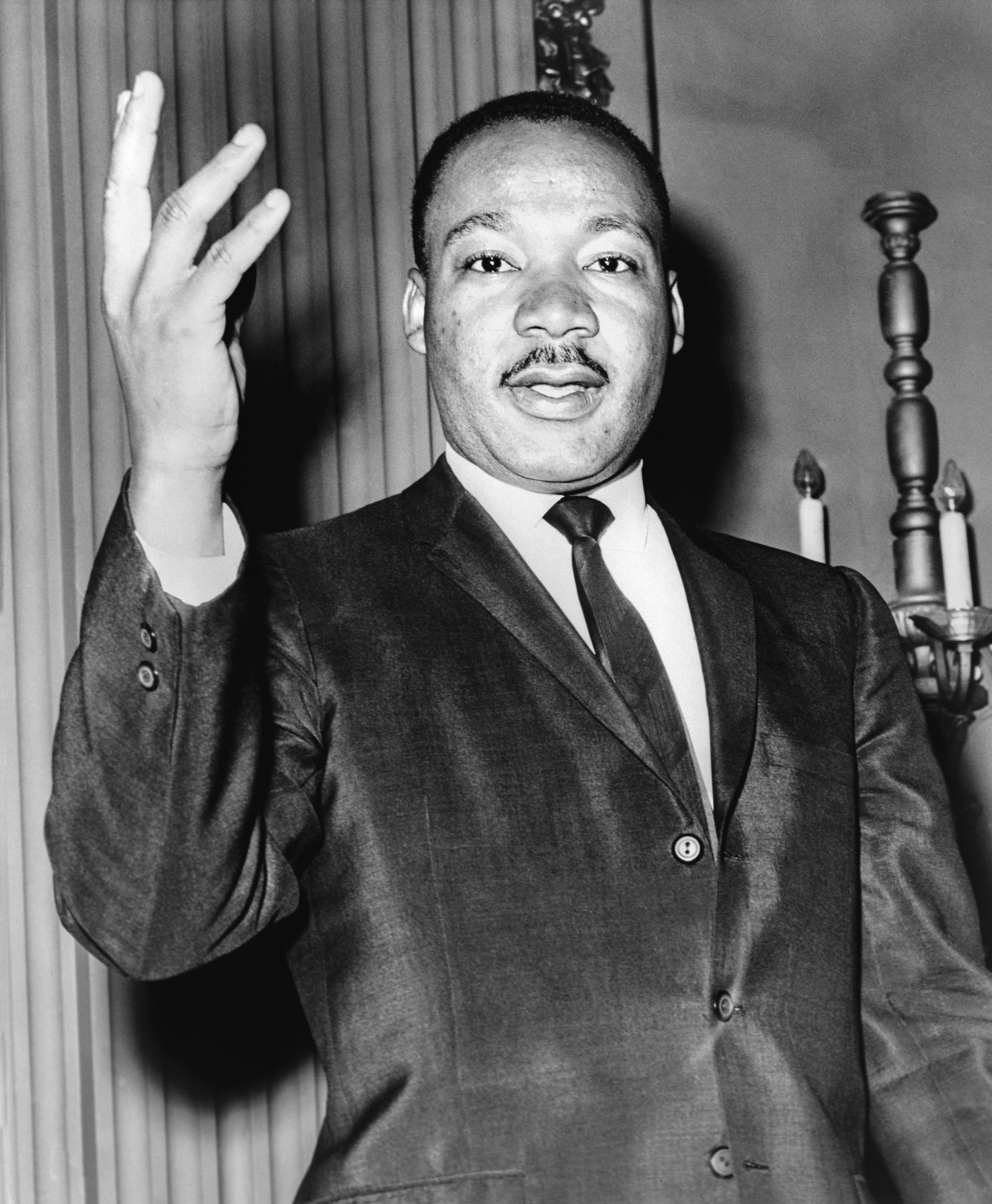
Activist Dr. Martin Luther King Jr.

- Vyto Kab, football player
- Kaliii, rapper
- John Kasay, football placekicker
- Mammy Kate, slave; American Revolutionary War figure
- James Keach, actor
- Stacy Keach, actor
- Fanny Kemble, actress
- Brian Porter Kemp, 83rd and current governor
- Charles Kelley, singer
- DeForest Kelley, actor
- Michael Kelly, actor; born in Pennsylvania
- Walt Kelly, cartoonist
- Alex Kendrick, screenwriter
- Stephen Kendrick, screenwriter
- D. James Kennedy, pastor, Christian broadcaster
- Joe Kennedy, state senator
- Khalid, singer
- Todd Kimsey, actor
- Brandon King, football player
- Kaki King, musician
- Marquette King, football punter
- Martin Luther King Jr., civil rights leader
- Gladys Knight, singer
- Lucian Lamar Knight, historian
- Ray Knight, baseball player, manager
- Leo Kottke, musician
- Ousman Krubally (born 1988), American-Gambian basketball player in the Israeli Basketball Premier League

== L ==
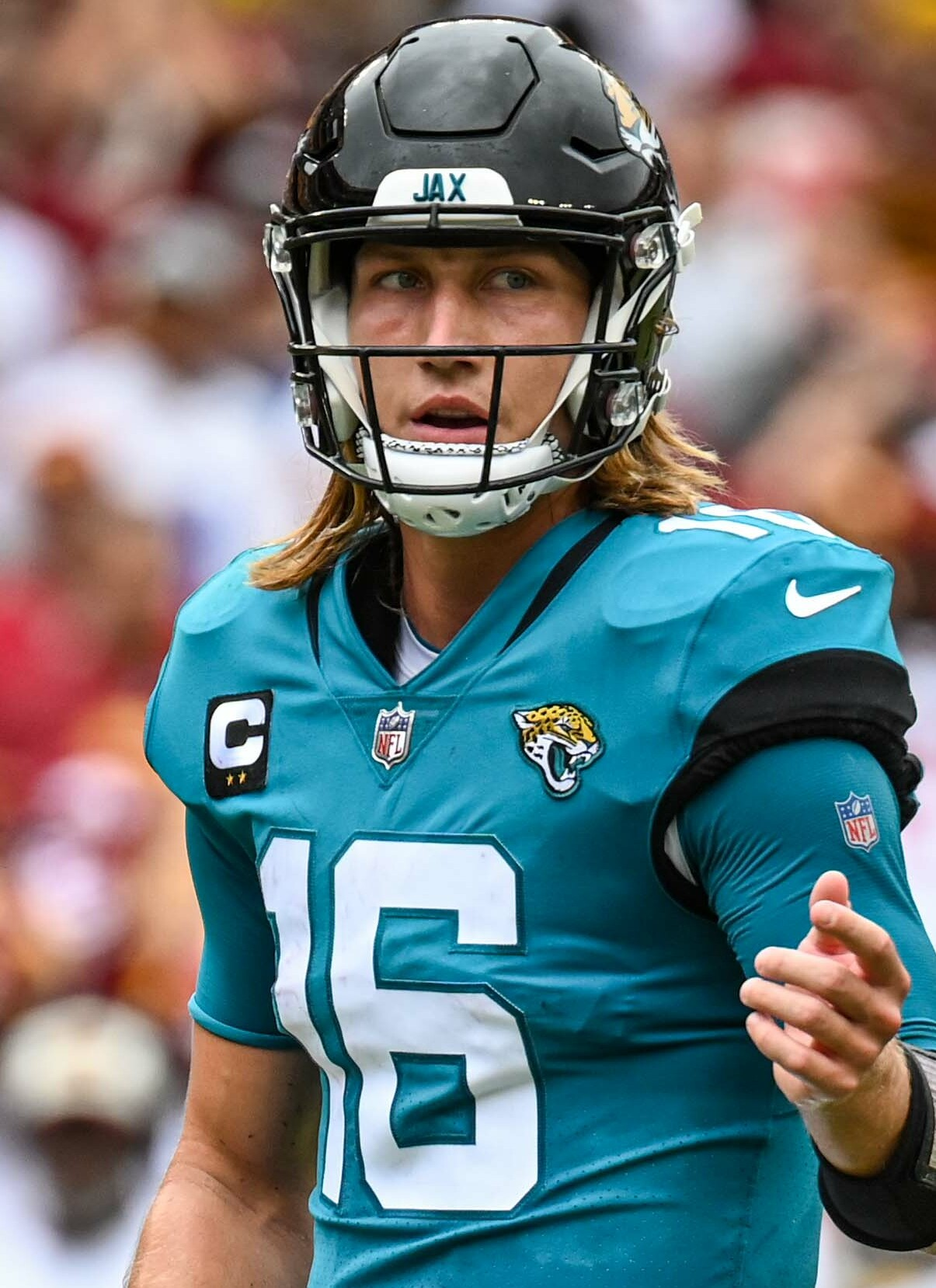
Football player Trevor Lawrence

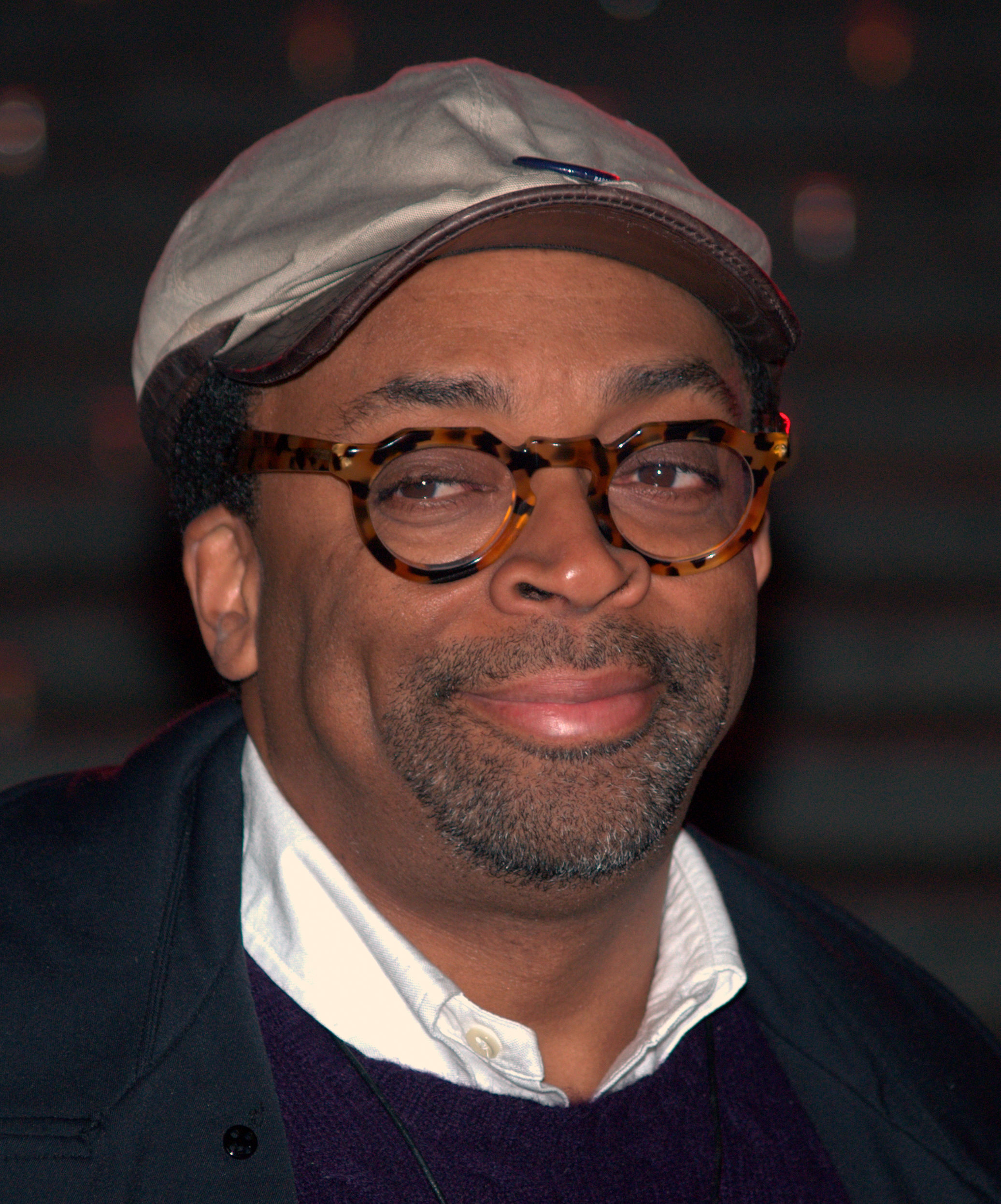
Film producer, director and actor Spike Lee

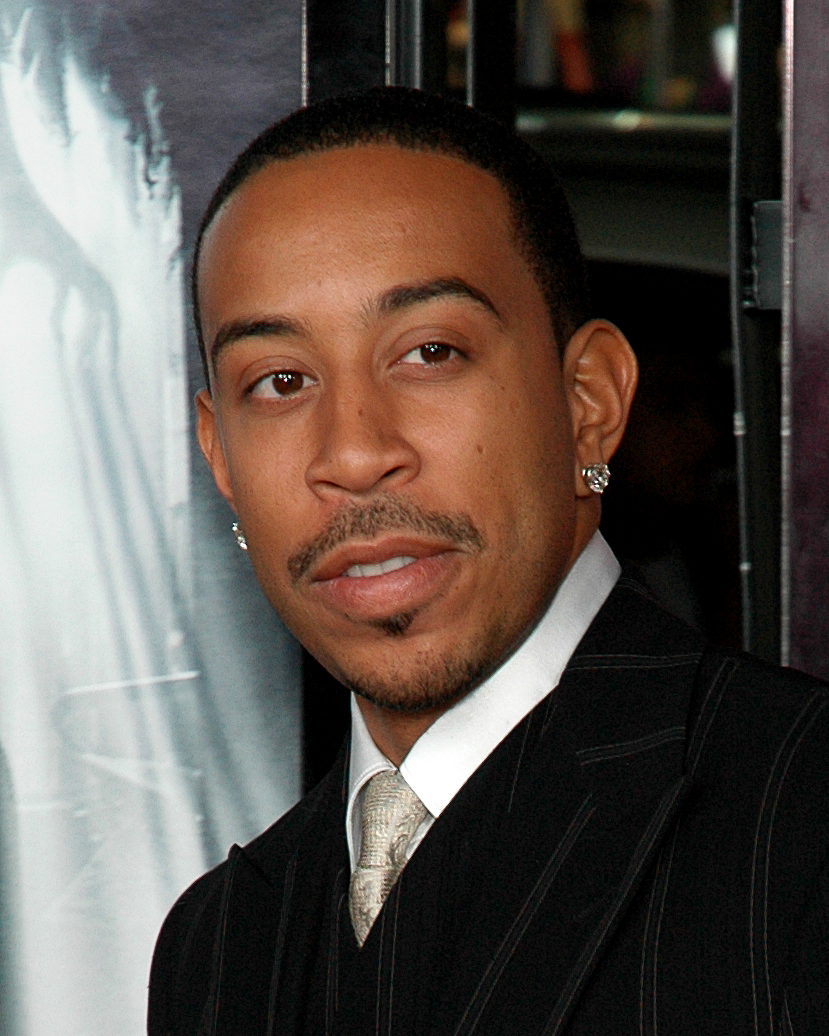
Rapper and actor Ludacris

- Christine Lakin, actress; born in Texas
- Gazaway Bugg Lamar, businessman
- Mirabeau Lamar, Texas politician
- Jeremy Lamb, basketball player
- Sonny Landham, actor
- Brandon Lang, football player
- Sidney Lanier, poet and musician
- Latto, rapper
- Peter Lawler, academic
- Trevor Lawrence, football player
- Chuck Leavell, musician
- Brenda Lee, singer
- Spike Lee, filmmaker
- Ron Lester, actor
- John Lewis, politician
- LightSkinKeisha, rapper
- Lil Baby, rapper
- Lil Jon, DJ; rapper; record producer
- Lil Nas X, rapper
- Lil Scrappy, rapper
- Lil Yachty, rapper
- Trevard Lindley, football player
- Hillary Lindsey, singer
- Little Richard, musician
- Samuel Little, serial killer
- Eric Lively, actor
- Robyn Lively, actress
- Natalia Livingston, actress
- Lloyd, singer
- Ricardo Lockette, football player
- Destroy Lonely, rapper
- Crawford Long, surgeon
- Helen Dortch Longstreet, newspaper editor, publisher
- James Longstreet, Civil War general; born in South Carolina
- Kyle Love, football player; born in South Korea
- Juliette Gordon Low, Girl Scouts founder
- Chris Lowell, actor
- Bill Lowery, music producer
- Jordan Loyd, basketball player
- Ludacris, rapper and actor
- Robert L. Lynn, poet

== M ==
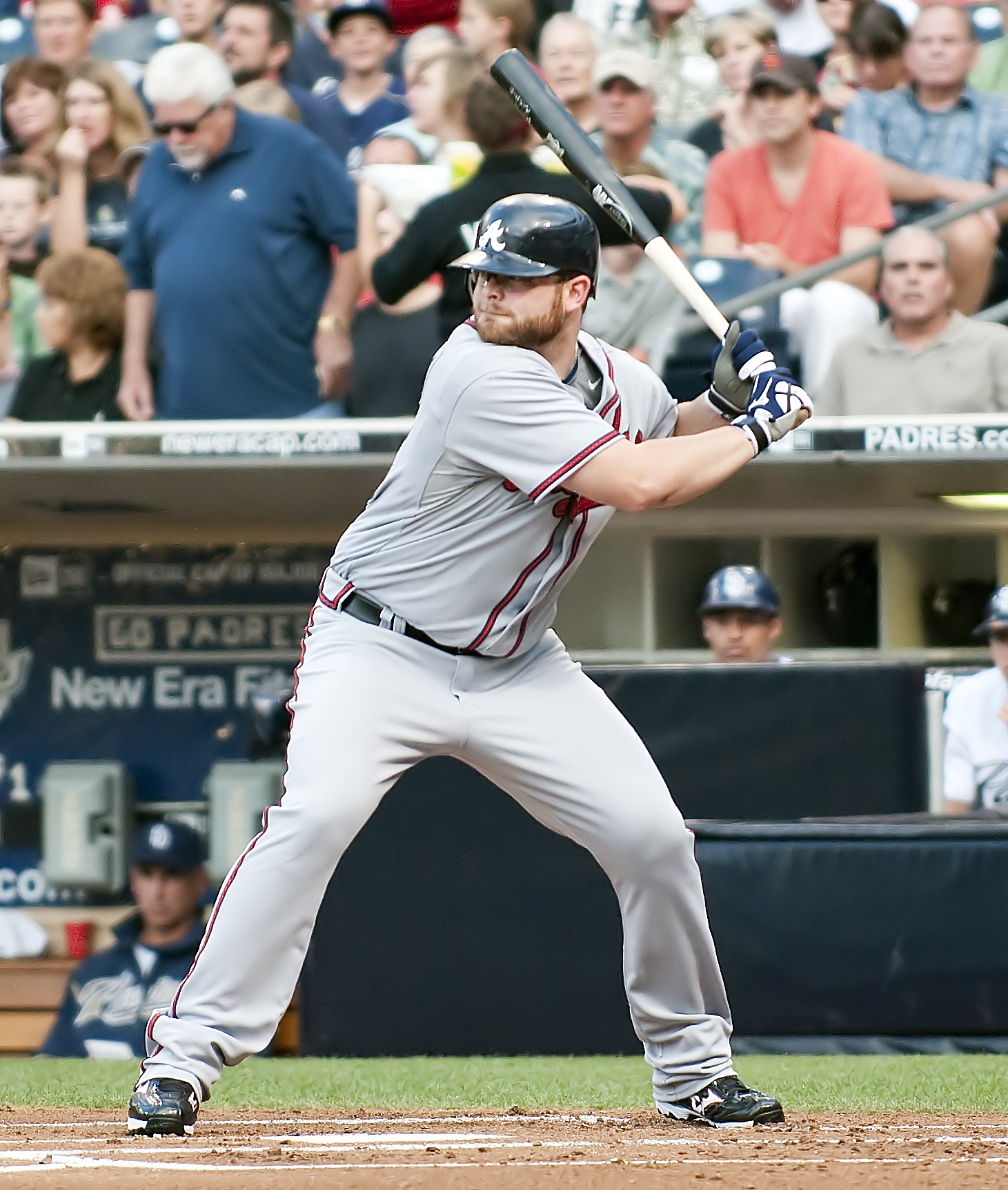
Baseball player Brian McCann

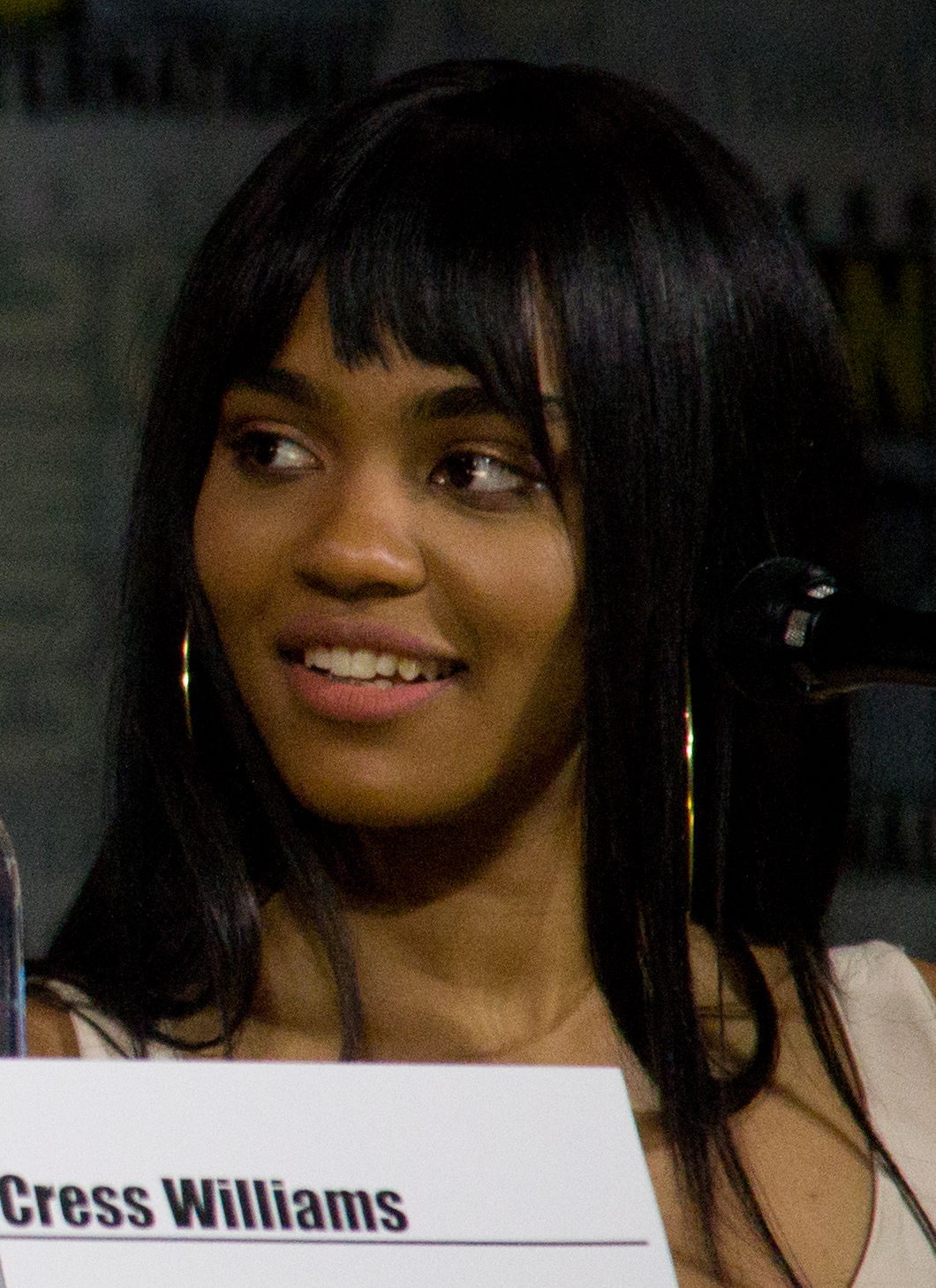
Actress China Anne McClain

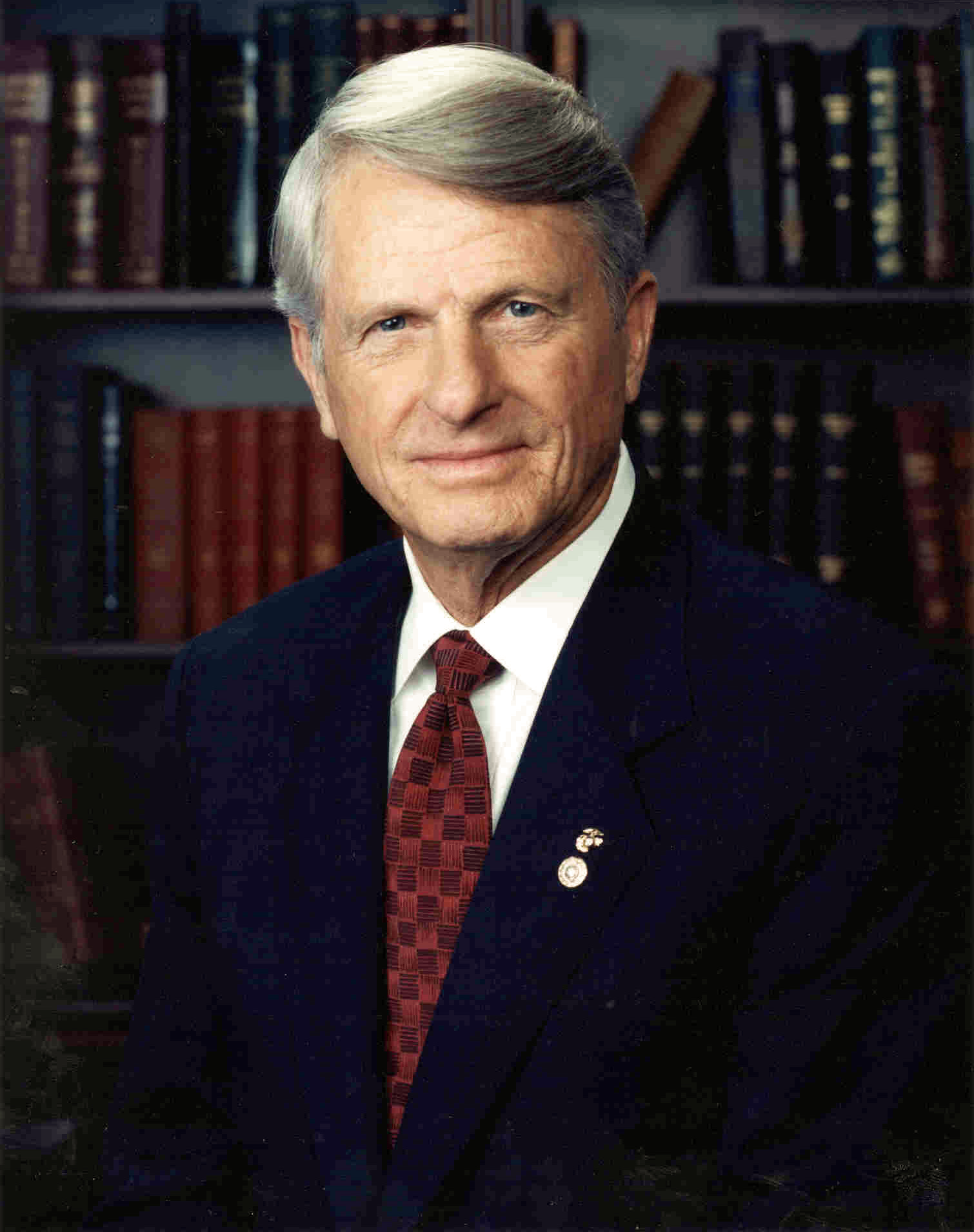
Former Georgia Governor Zell Miller

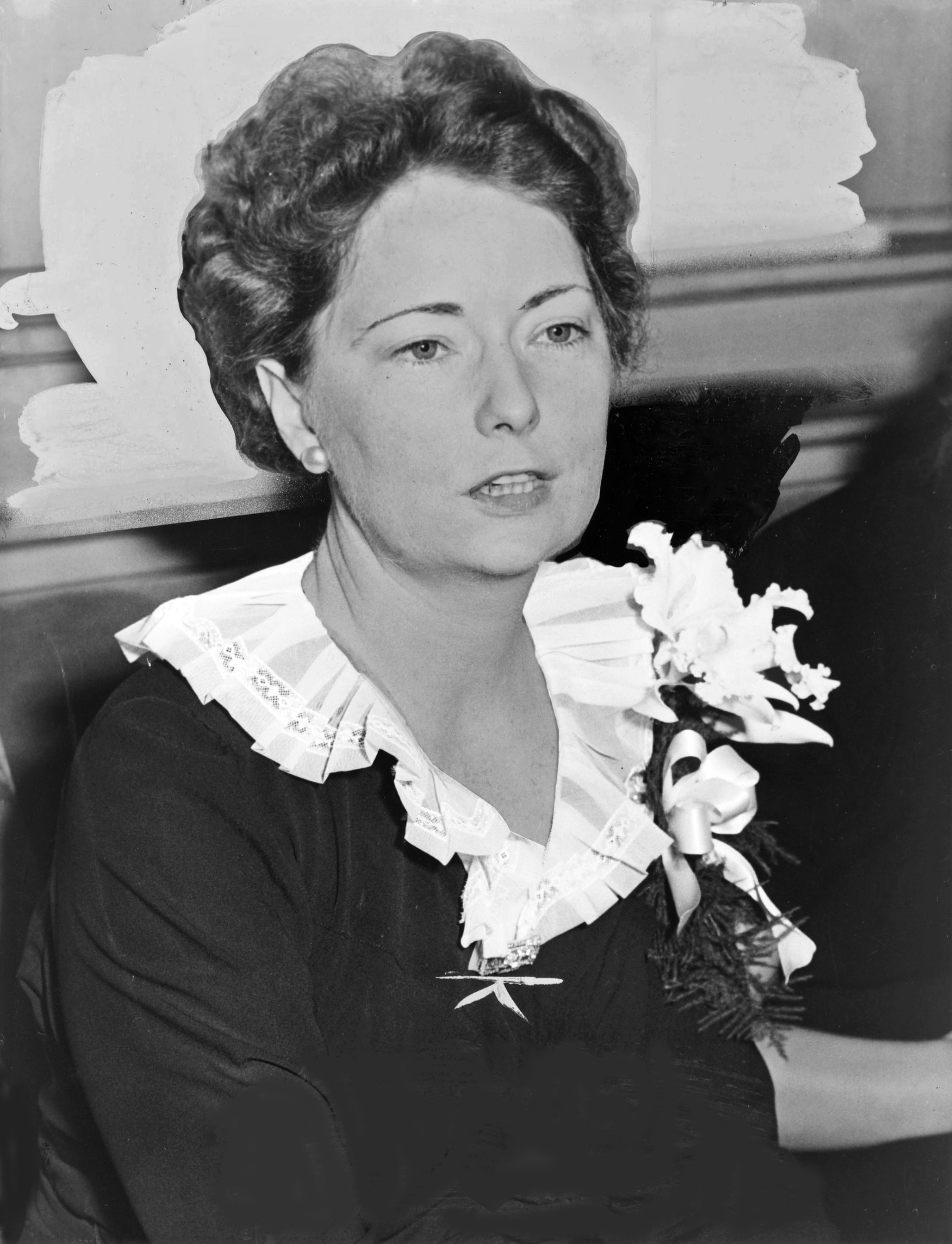
Gone with the Wind author Margaret Mitchell

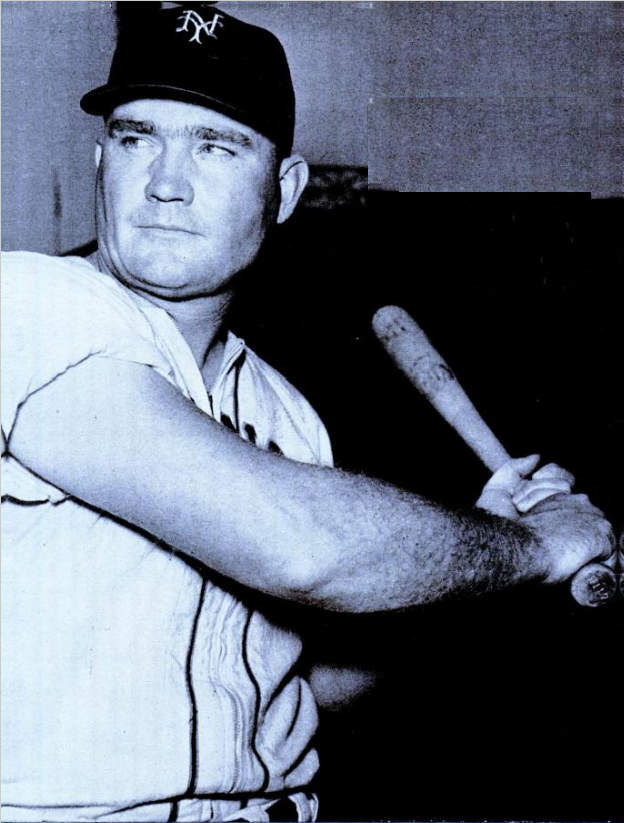
Baseball player Johnny Mize

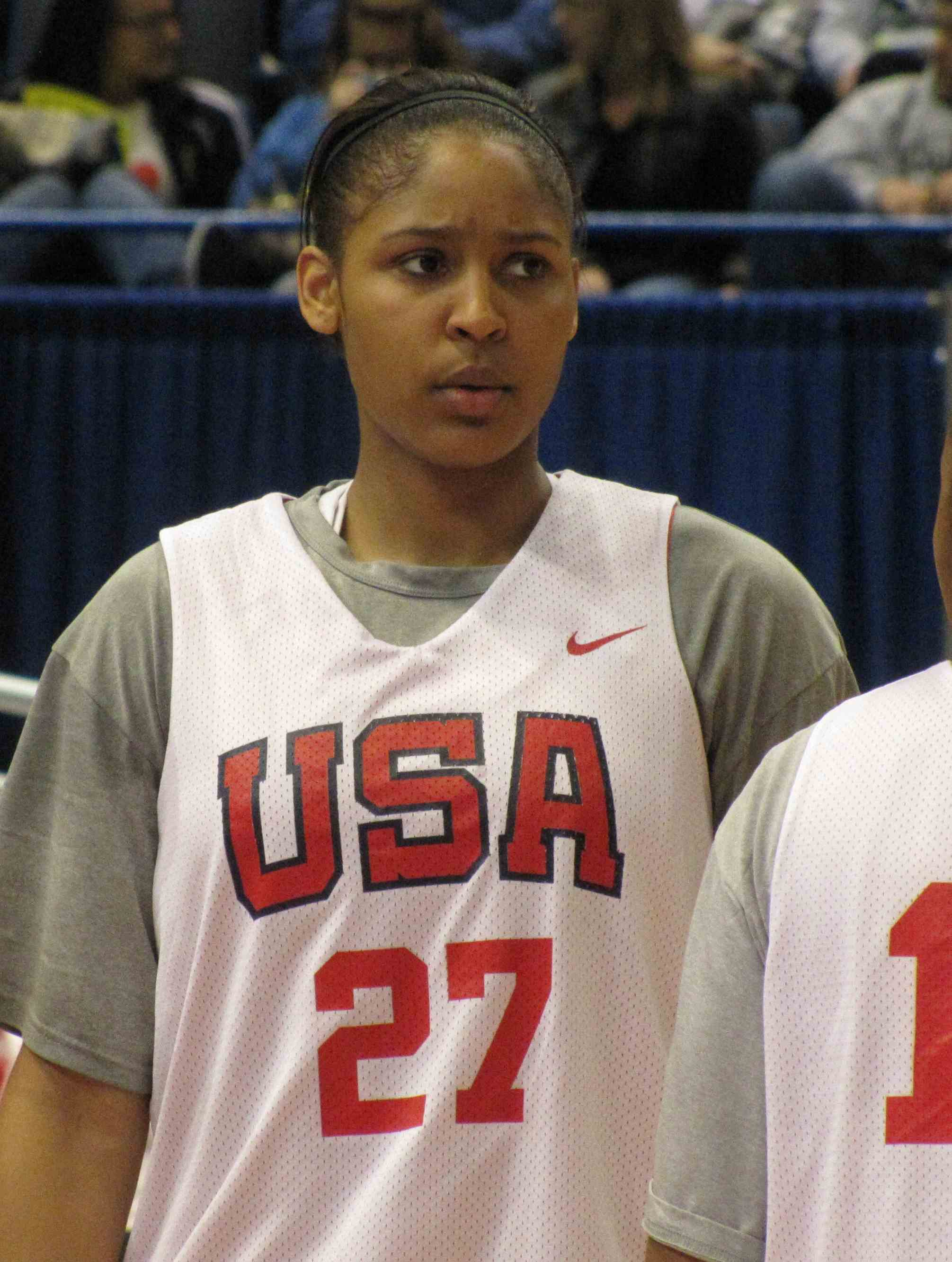
Basketball player Maya Moore

- William H. Macy, actor; born in Florida
- Lester Maddox, politician; governor of Georgia
- Sam Madison, football player
- Manuel Maloof, politician
- Gucci Mane, rapper; born in Alabama
- Patrick Mannelly, football player
- Jerry Manuel, baseball player and manager
- Stephen Mansfield, author
- Nick Markakis, baseball player; born in New York
- Chan Marshall, singer
- Nick Marshall, football player
- Margaret Martin, professional bodybuilder
- Sam Martin, football player
- Jonathan Massaquoi, football player
- Kyle Massey, actor
- Clint Mathis, soccer player and coach
- Robert Mathis, football player
- Erskine Mayer (1889–1957), baseball player
- John Mayer, singer; born in Connecticut
- William McAdoo, politician; U.S. secretary of the treasury
- Jack McBrayer, actor
- Danny R. McBride, actor
- Brian McCann, baseball player
- Matt McClure, journalist, actor
- AnnaLynne McCord, actress
- Demetrius McCray, football player; born in California
- Carson McCullers, author
- Dustin McGowan, baseball player
- Curtis McGriff, football player
- Collin McHugh, baseball player
- William McIntosh, Native American chief
- Cynthia McKinney, U.S. representative
- Ray McKinnon, actor
- Randy McMichael, football player
- Marcus McNeill, football player; born in Chicago
- Jordan McRae (born 1991), basketball player for Hapoel Tel Aviv of the Israeli Basketball Premier League
- Blind Willie McTell, musician
- Austin Meadows, baseball player
- Jodie Meeks, basketball player; born in Tennessee
- Jesse Mercer, minister, educator; born in North Carolina
- Johnny Mercer, composer
- LaVon Mercer (born 1959), American-Israeli basketball player
- Lydia Meredith, author
- Jakobi Meyers, football player
- Tracy Middendorf, actress; born in Florida
- Mike Mills, co-founder of rock band REM
- Bruce Miller, football player
- James C. Miller III, budget director for President Ronald Reagan
- Zell Miller, U.S. senator from Georgia; governor of Georgia
- Patrick Millsaps, chief of staff to Newt Gingrich's 2012 campaign for the Republican nomination; film and television producer
- Jeremy Mincey, football player
- Kevin Minter, football player
- Wilbur Mitcham, chef
- E. Coppée Mitchell (1836–1887), professor and dean of the University of Pennsylvania Law School
- Malcolm Mitchell, football player
- Margaret Mitchell, author
- Sam Mitchell, basketball player
- Johnny Mize, baseball player
- Victoria Monét, singer and songwriter
- Monica, singer
- Joanna Moore, actress
- Kip Moore, singer
- Maya Moore, basketball player
- Knowshon Moreno, football player
- Chloë Grace Moretz, actress
- Megan Moroney, singer
- Matthew David Morris, YouTuber, rapper
- Randolph Morris, basketball player; born in Texas
- Chesley V. Morton, stockbroker, state representative; born in Florida
- Brandon Mosley, football player
- Brandon Moss, baseball player
- Elijah Muhammad, Muslim leader
- Shawn Mullins, singer
- Lenda Murray, IFBB professional bodybuilder; born in Michigan
- Lauren Myracle, author

== N ==
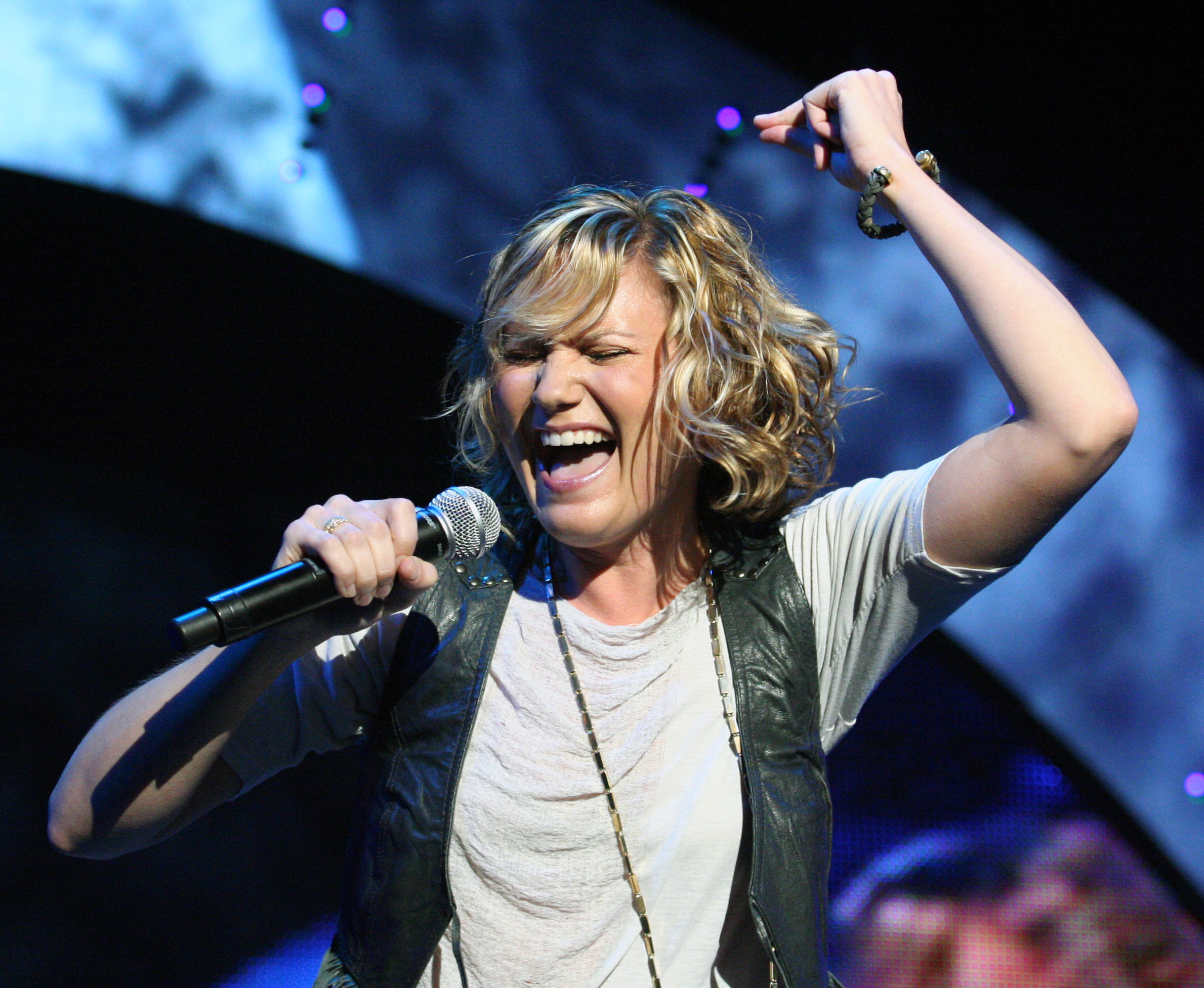
Musician Jennifer Nettles

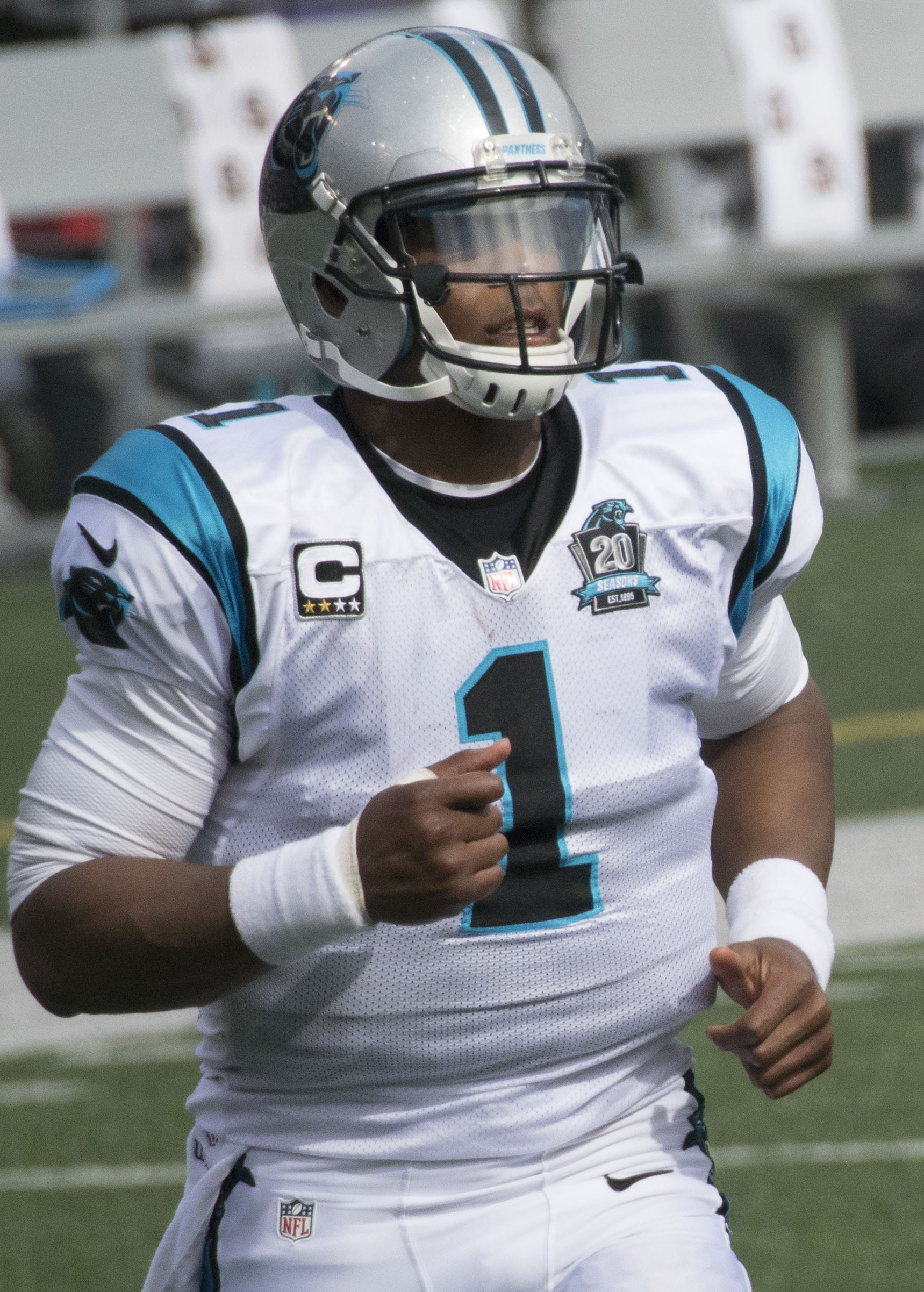
Football player Cam Newton

- James Nabrit Jr., civil rights attorney
- Eric Nam, singer
- James Neill, silent film actor
- Susan Neiman, moral philosopher
- Steven Nelson, football player
- Jennifer Nettles, musician
- Daniel Newman, model and actor
- Fred Newman, actor
- Warren Newson, baseball player
- Cam Newton, football player
- Anne Nichols, playwright
- Nivea, singer
- Jessye Norman, singer
- Maidie Norman, actress
- Pettis Norman, football player
- Normani, singer
- Deborah Norville, television personality
- Sam Nunn, U.S. senator

== O ==
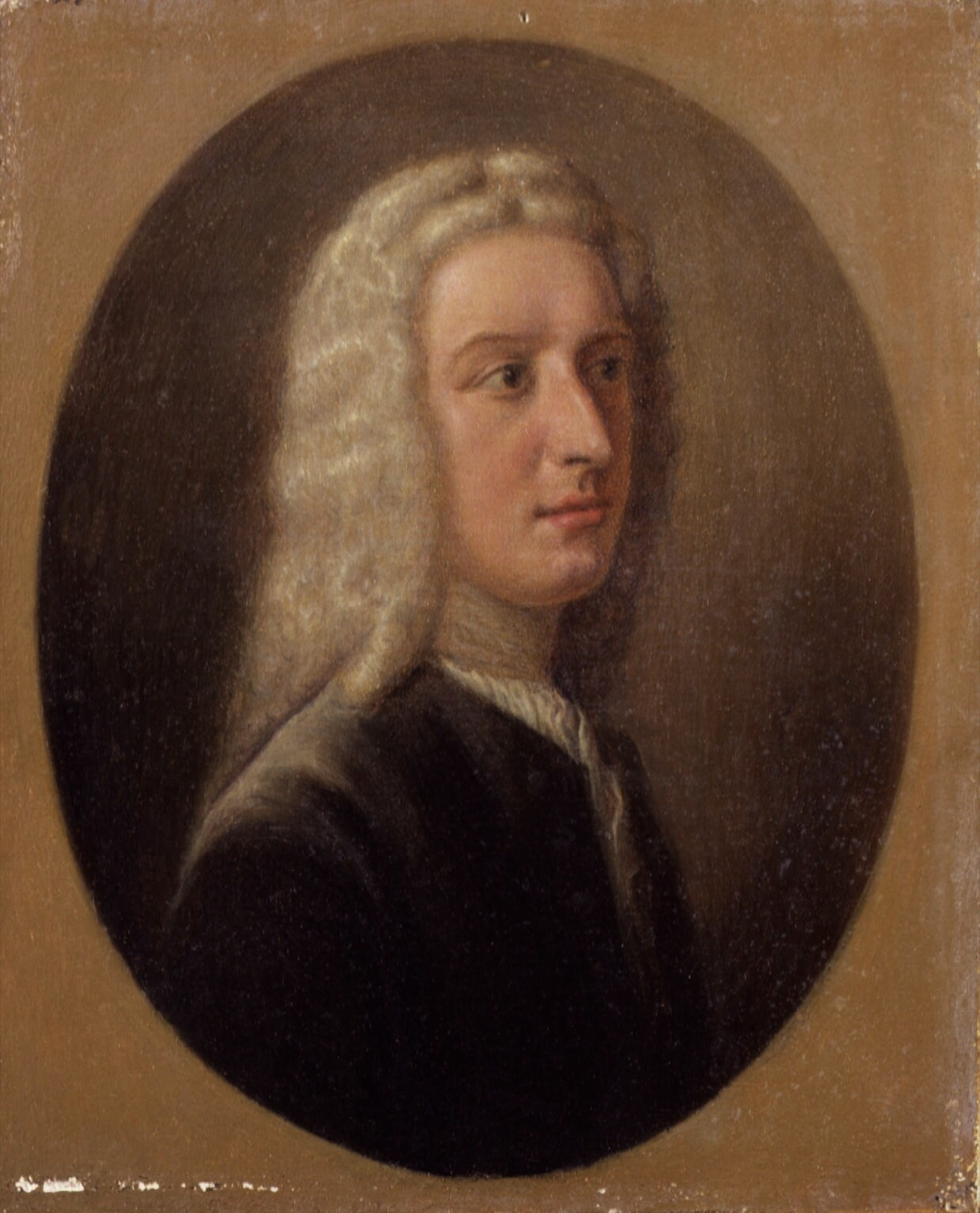
Founder and first governor of Georgia, James Oglethorpe

- Flannery O'Connor, author
- Eugene Odum, University of Georgia faculty member
- Offset, rapper; member of Migos
- James Oglethorpe, state founder; born in England
- Alec Ogletree, football player
- Kelley O'Hara, soccer player; USWNT/Washington Spirit defender
- Maude Andrews Ohl, journalist, poet, writer
- Michael Ola, football player
- Javianne Oliver, track and field sprinter
- Paul Oliver, football player
- Matt Olson, baseball player
- Elizabeth Omilami, activist
- Sean O'Pry, supermodel
- Melissa Ordway, actress
- Jon Ossoff, U.S. senator
- Monroe Owsley, actor

== P ==
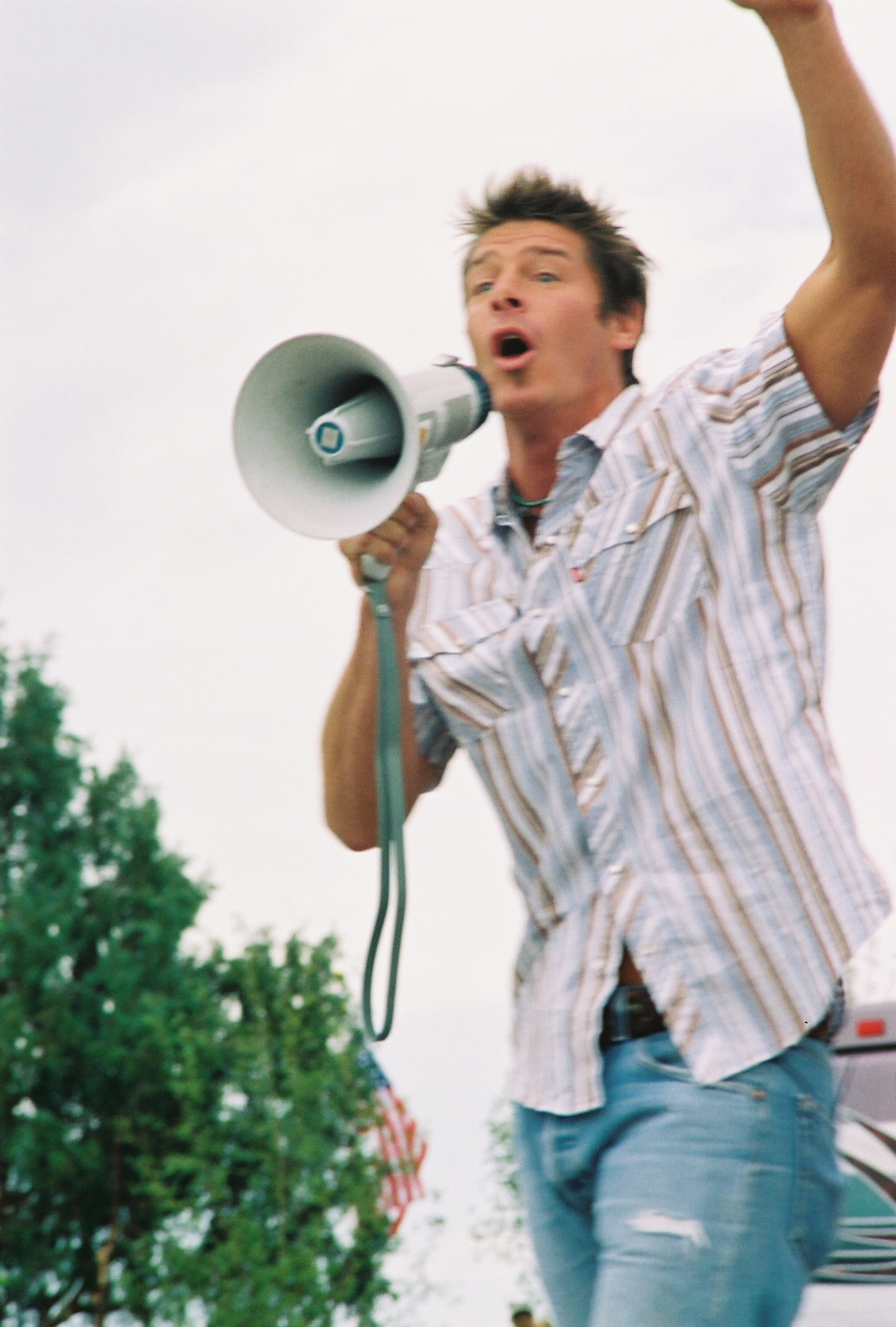
Television host Ty Pennington

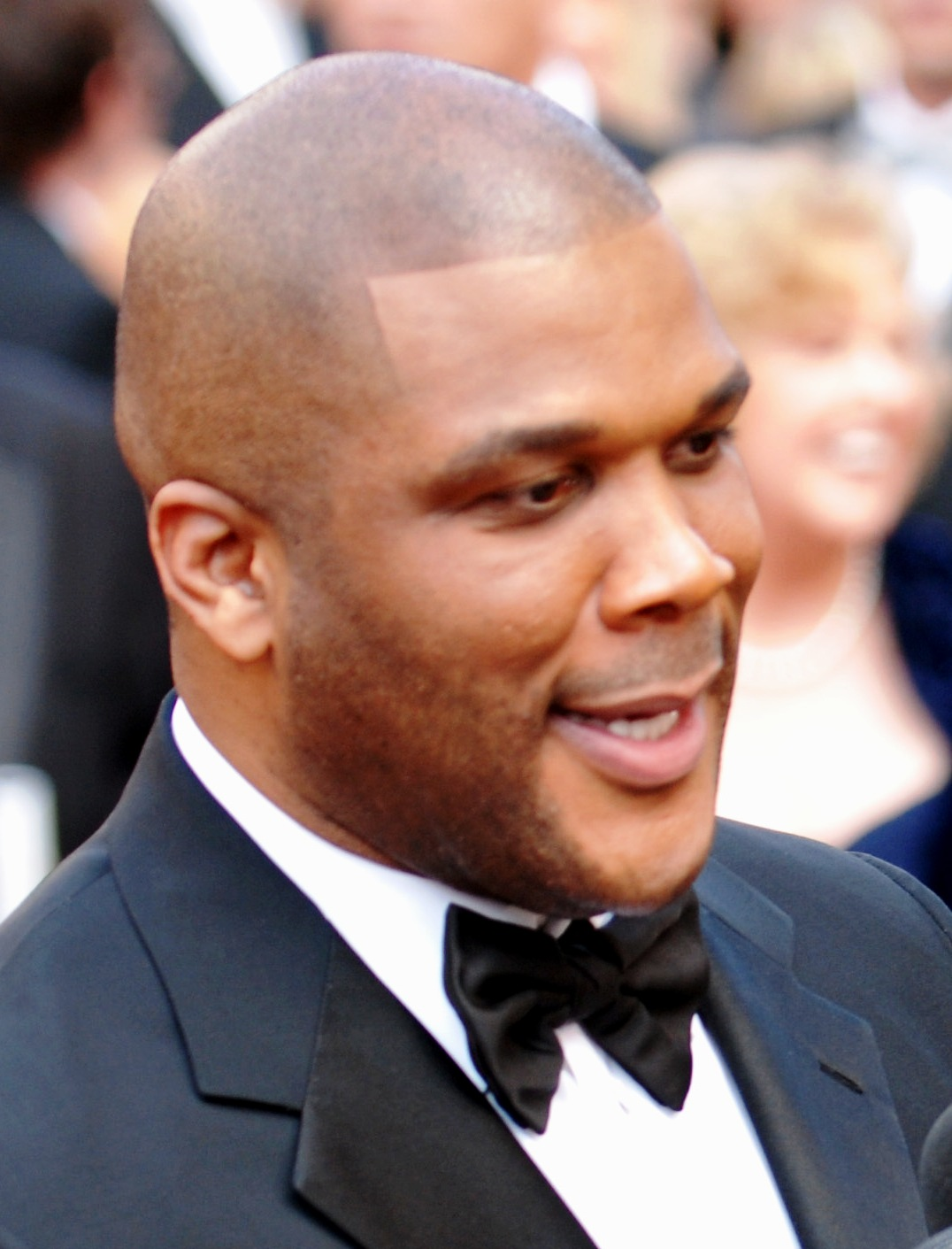
Producer Tyler Perry

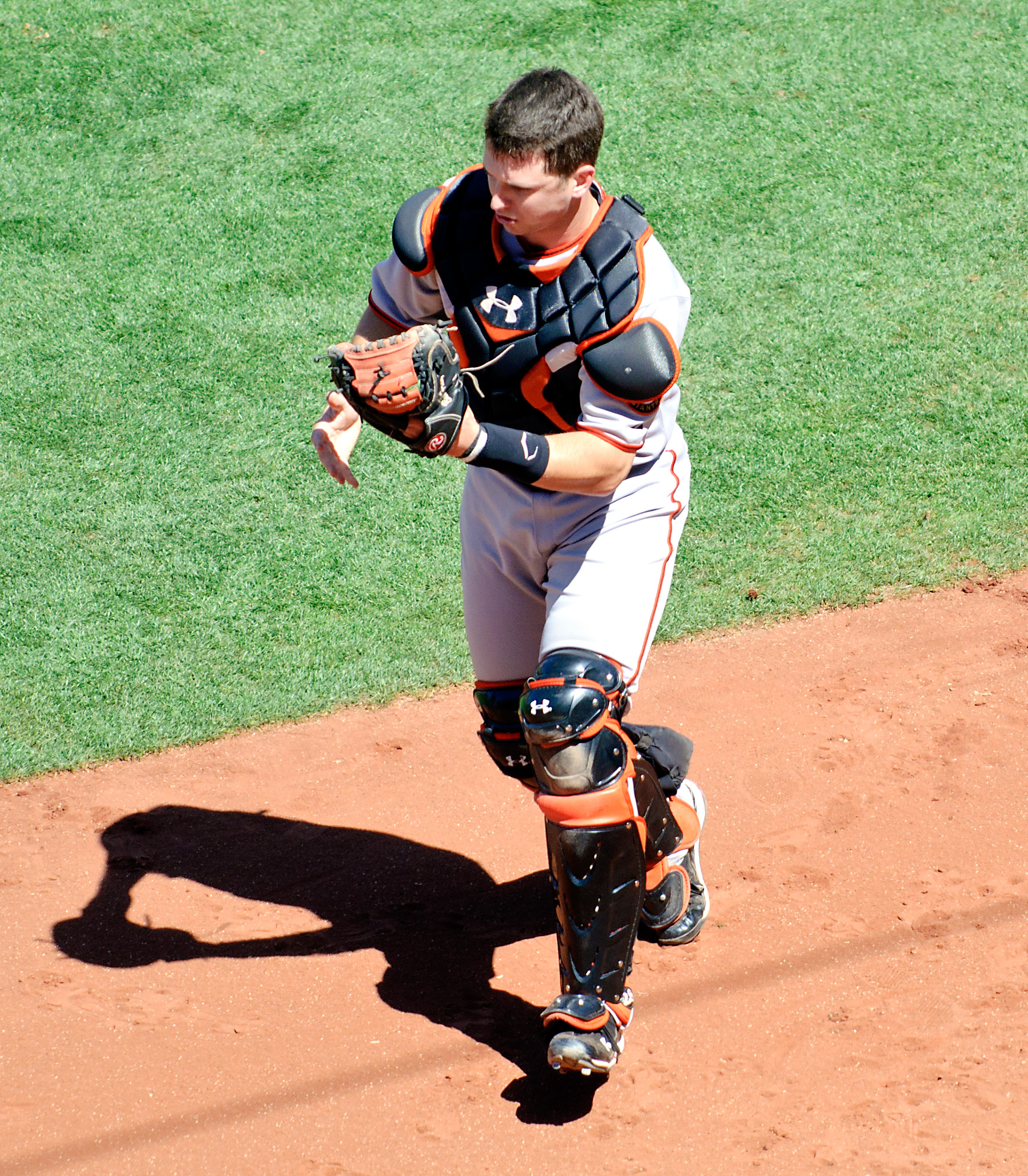
Baseball player Buster Posey

- Sean P, musician; member of Southern hip hop duo YoungBloodZ
- Harrison Page, actor
- Michael Palmer, football player
- Kay Panabaker, actress, zoologist
- Danielle Panabaker, actress
- Albert Parker, businessman
- Jim Parker, football player
- Bert Parks, singer and actor
- Gram Parsons, musician; born in Florida
- Patrick Pass, football player
- Krish Patel, cricket player
- Robert Patrick, actor
- Corey Patterson, baseball player
- Eric Patterson, baseball player; born in Florida
- E. Earl Patton, politician
- Jo Marie Payton, actress
- George Foster Peabody, banker and philanthropist
- Dr. John Stith Pemberton, inventor of Coca-Cola
- Tyler Perry, actor, producer, director
- Ty Pennington, television personality (Extreme Makeover Home Edition, Trading Spaces)
- Madeleine Peyroux, jazz singer, songwriter
- William Pierce, white nationalist; physicist; writer
- Brandon Phillips, baseball player; born in North Carolina
- Dwight Phillips, long jumper
- Phillip Phillips, singer, winner of American Idol Season 11
- Mareno Philyaw, football player
- James Ponsoldt, director, actor, screenwriter
- Buster Posey, baseball player
- Pogo Possum, fictional character
- Mac Powell, singer, Third Day; born in Alabama
- Samantha Power, United States Ambassador to the United Nations; born in Ireland
- Harriet Powers (1837–1910), African American slave quilt artist
- Robert Poydasheff, mayor of Columbus, Georgia
- Alex Poythress (born 1993), American-Ivorian basketball player for Maccabi Tel Aviv of the Israeli Premier Basketball League
- Carrie Preston, actress
- Kazimierz Pułaski, nobleman; born in Poland; died in Savannah
- Shannon Purser, actress

== Q ==
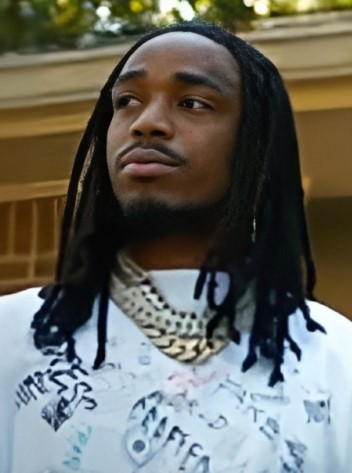
Rapper Quavo

- Quando Rondo, rapper
- Quavo, rapper

== R ==
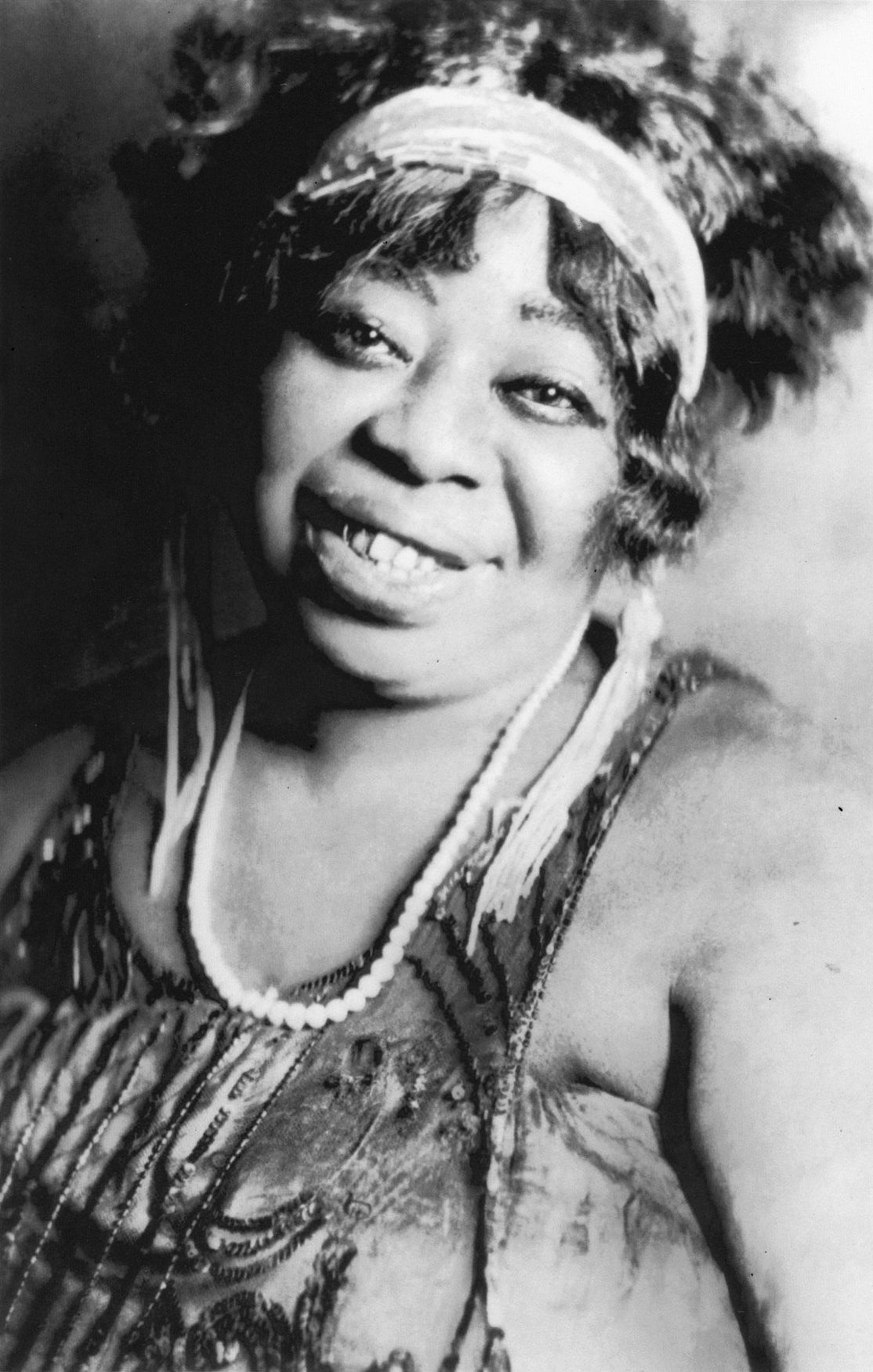
Blues singer Ma Rainey

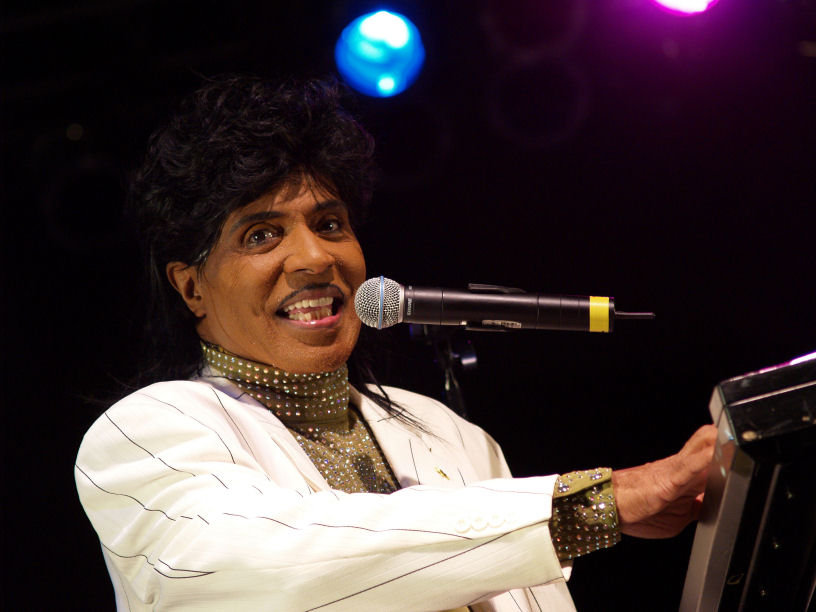
Musician Richard Wayne Penniman, better known as Little Richard

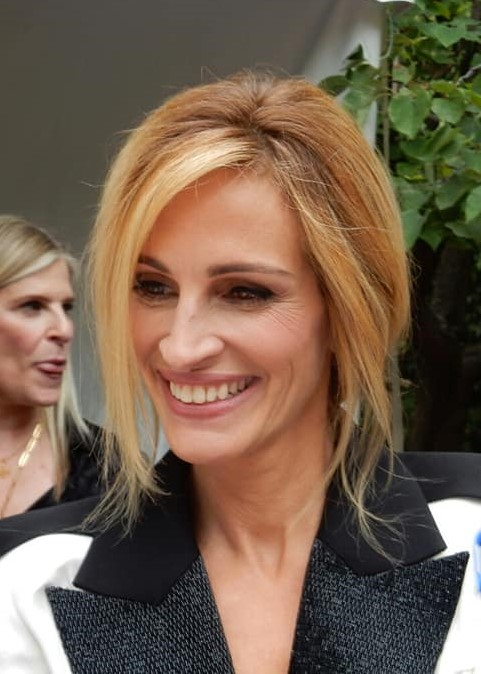
Actress Julia Roberts

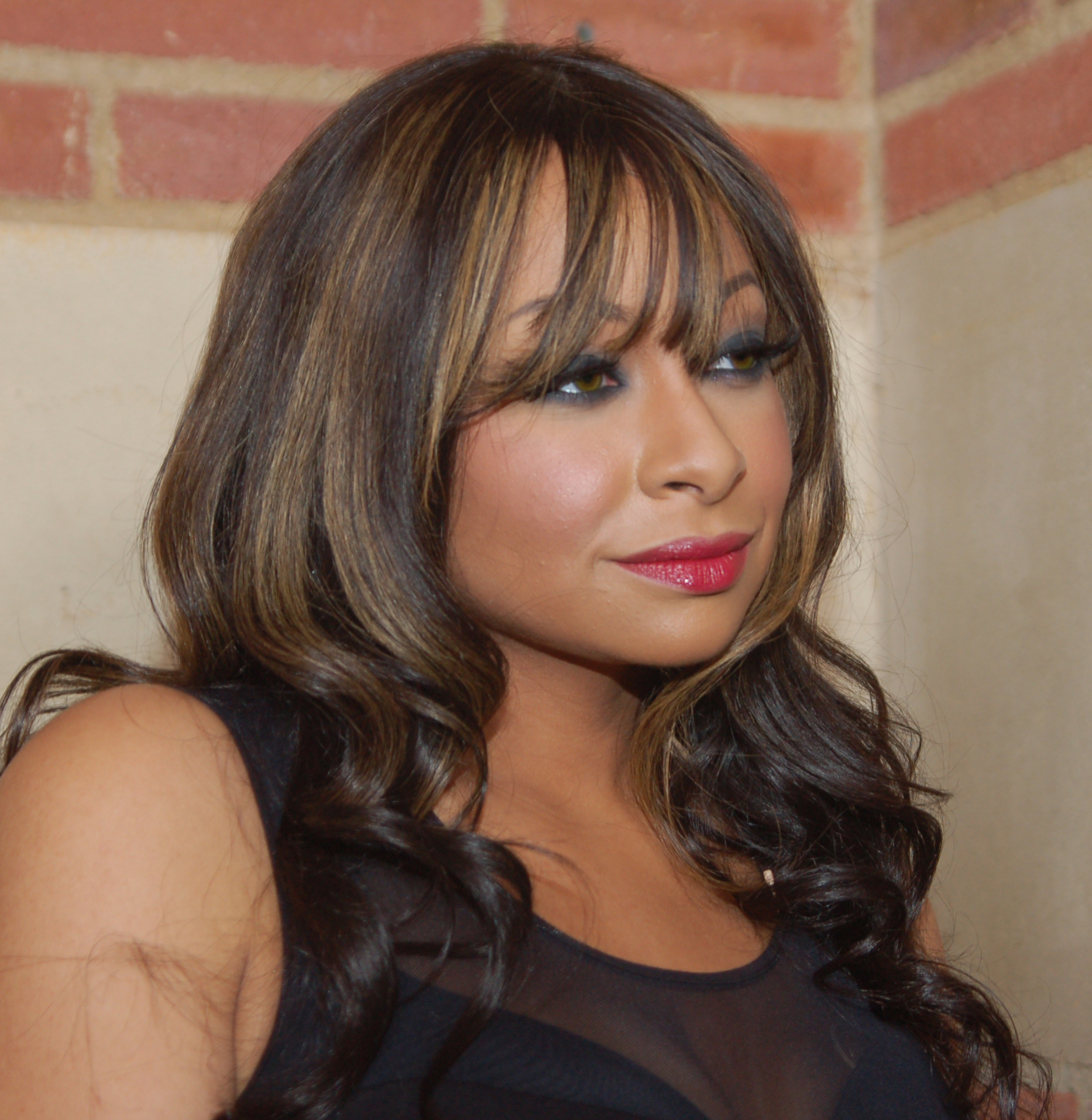
Actress Raven-Symoné

- David Ragan, NASCAR driver
- Ma Rainey, blues singer
- Bacarri Rambo, football player
- JonBenét Ramsey, child beauty queen
- Jeannette Rankin, first congresswoman
- Rasheeda, rapper
- Colby Rasmus, baseball player
- Jeremiah Ratliff, football player; born in Florida
- Raven-Symoné, actress
- Amy Ray, singer
- Boygar Razikashvili
- Paul Rea, television journalist
- Blair Redford, actor
- Josh Reddick, baseball player
- Otis Redding, singer
- Jerry Reed, singer and actor
- Ralph Reed, political activist; born in Virginia
- Dan Reeves, football coach
- Marco Restrepo, musician
- Ben Revere, baseball player
- Jamal Reynolds, football player
- Thomas Rhett, singer
- Cody Rhodes, professional wrestler
- Little Richard, musician
- Latanya Richardson, actress
- Travis Richter, musician
- Jody Ridley, NASCAR driver
- Chandler Riggs, actor
- Perry Riley, football player
- Eric Roberts, actor
- Julia Roberts, actress
- Paul Craig Roberts, economist
- Pernell Roberts, actor
- Chris Robinson, singer
- Dunta Robinson, football player
- Jackie Robinson, baseball player
- Keith Robinson, actor; born in Kentucky
- Sugar Ray Robinson, boxer
- Bradley Roby, football player; born in Texas
- John Rocker, baseball player
- Tommy Roe, singer
- Carlos Rogers, football player
- Kenny Rogers, baseball player
- Scott Rogers, hiker
- Ed Roland, musician
- Franklin D. Roosevelt, U.S. president; born and raised in New York; had second home in Georgia and died there
- Rubi Rose, rapper
- David Ross, baseball player
- Kelly Rowland, singer
- Billy Joe Royal, singer
- Dean Rusk, U.S. secretary of state
- Richard Russell Jr., politician

== S ==
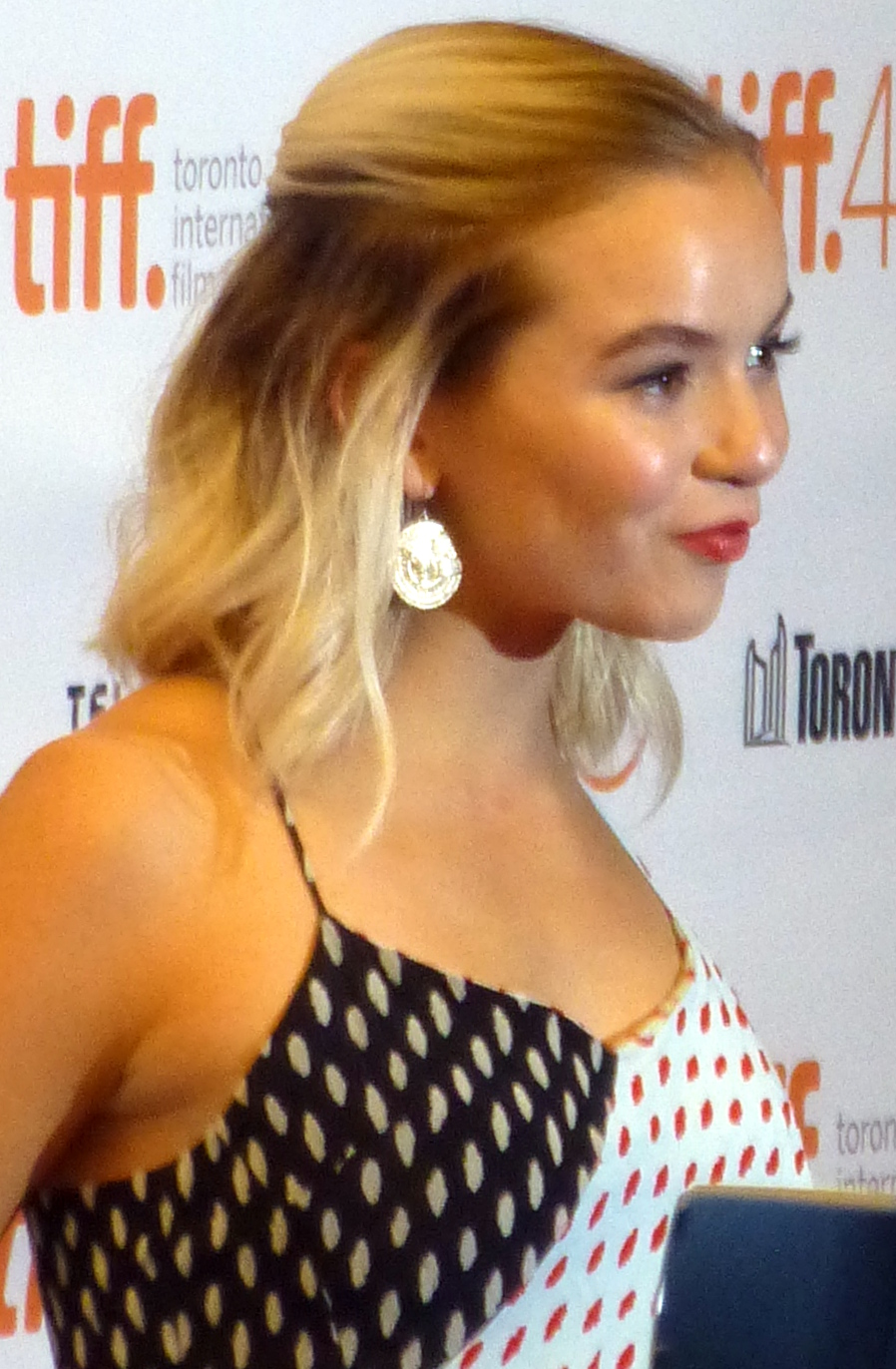
Actress Morgan Saylor

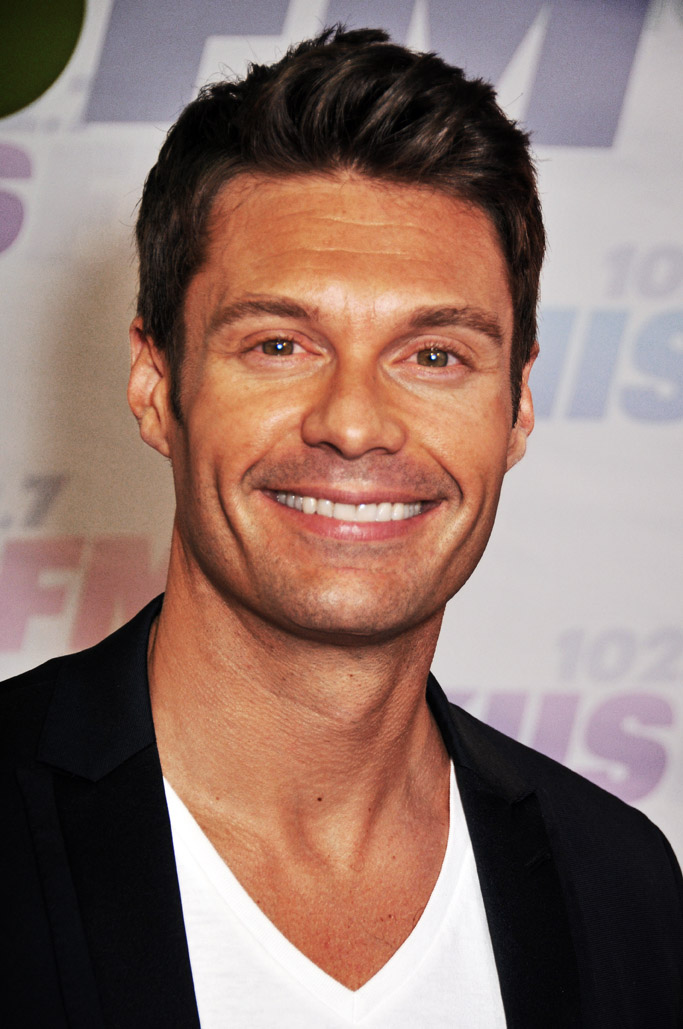
Television personality Ryan Seacrest

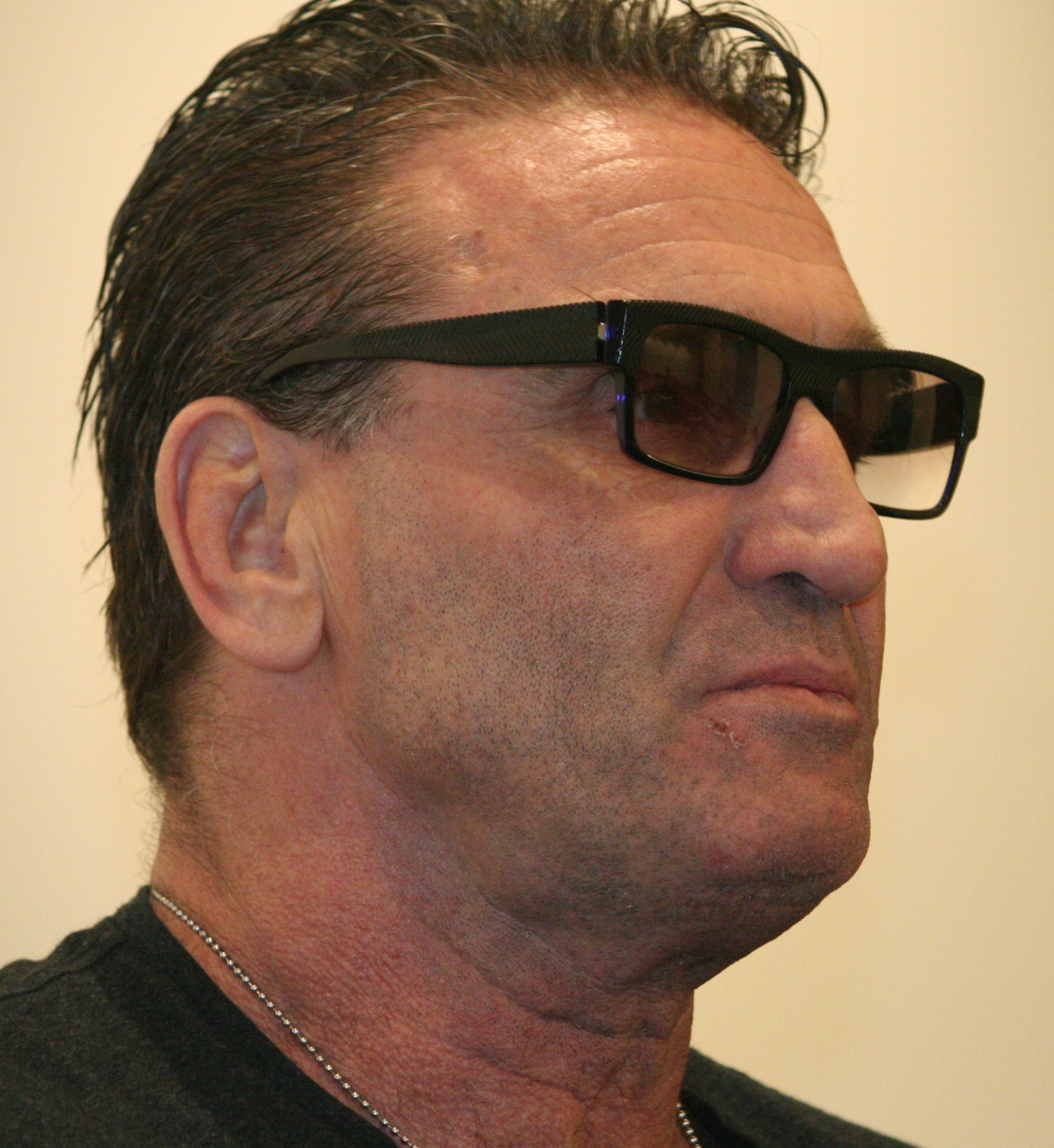
MMA fighter and pro wrestler Ken Shamrock

Football player Shannon Sharpe

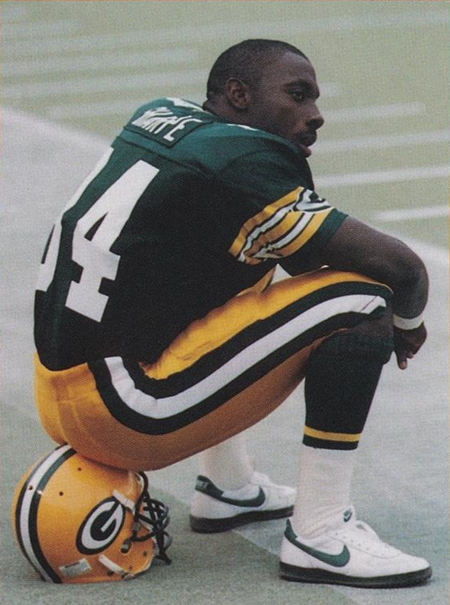
Football player Sterling Sharpe

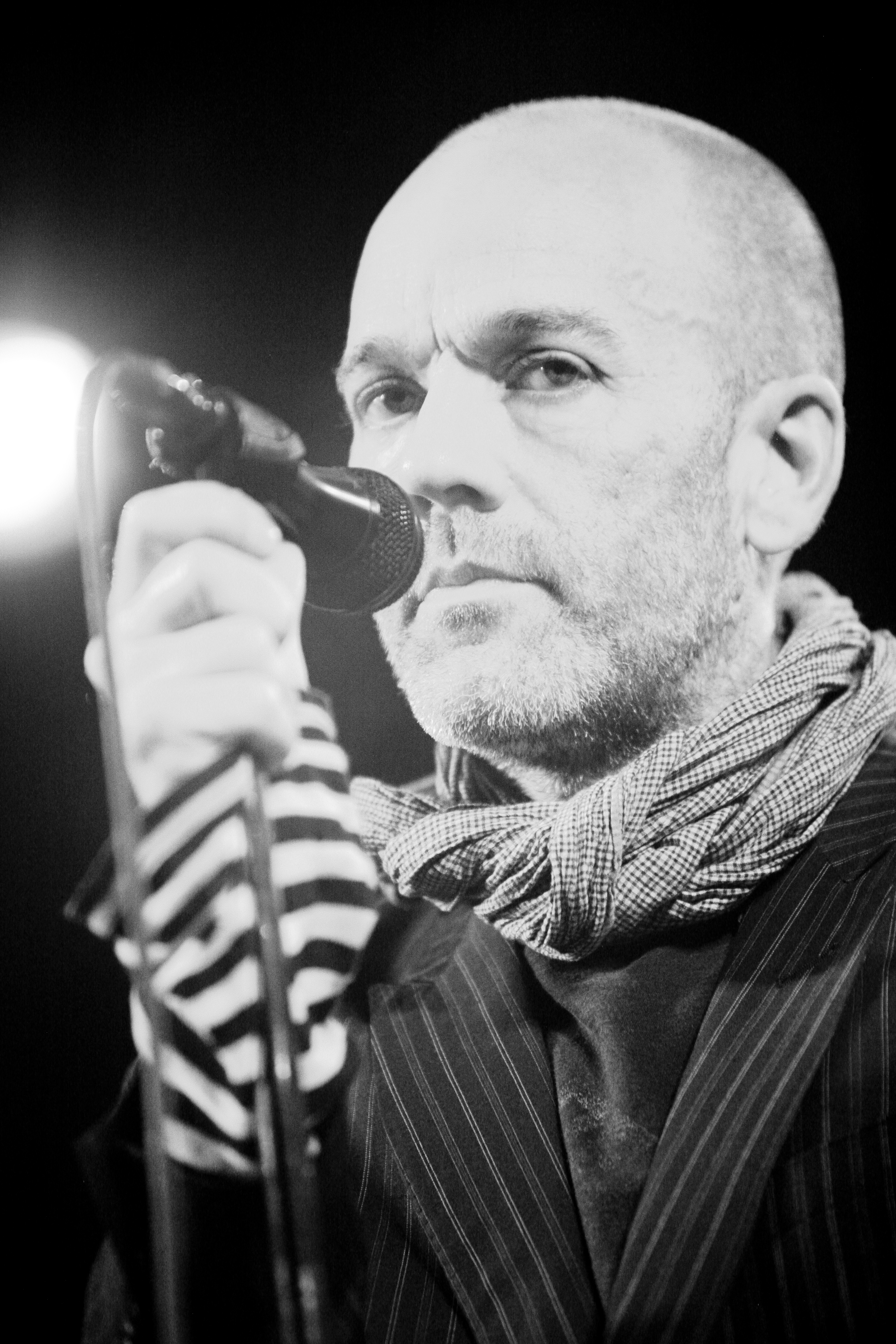
Musician Michael Stipe of R.E.M.

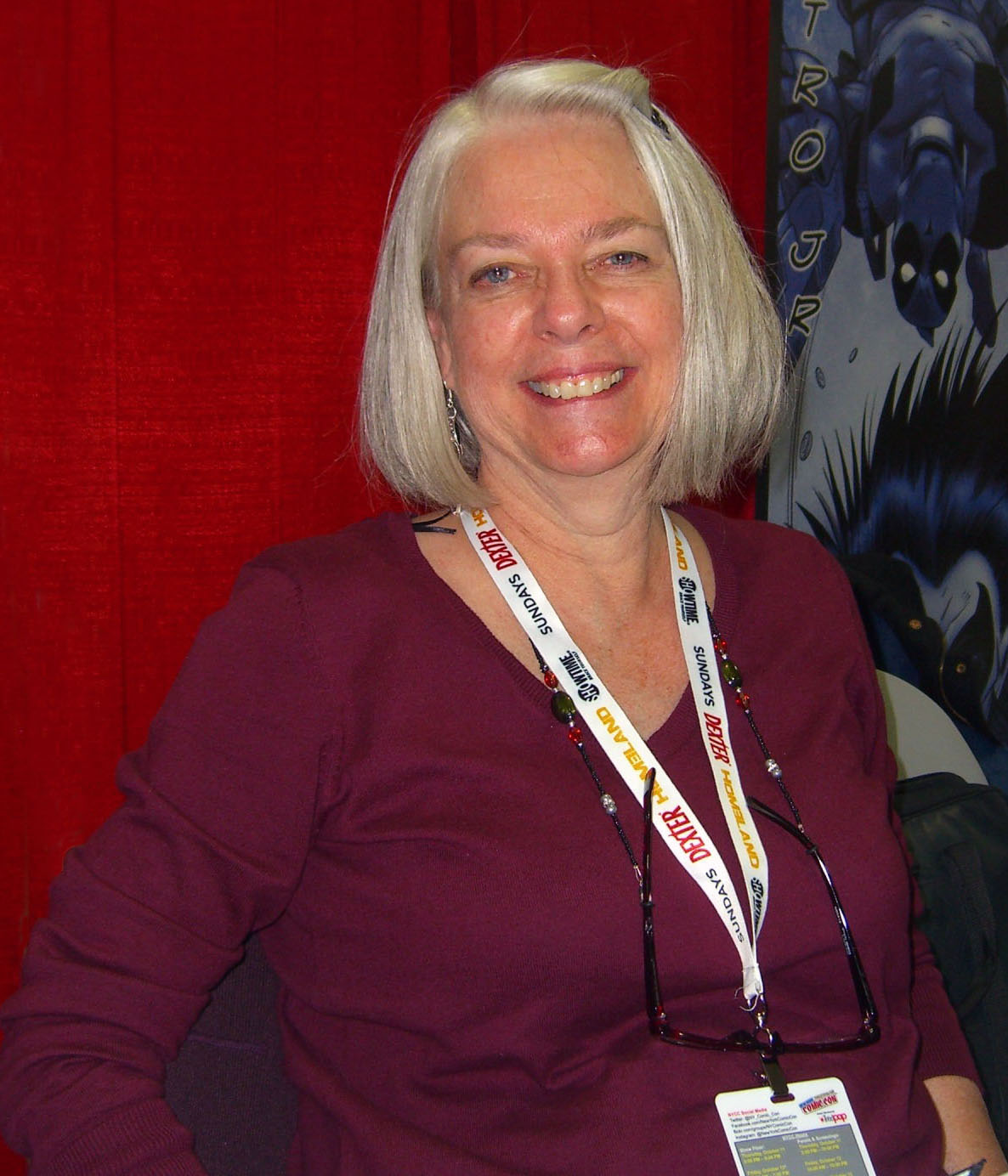
Comic book writer Louise Simonson

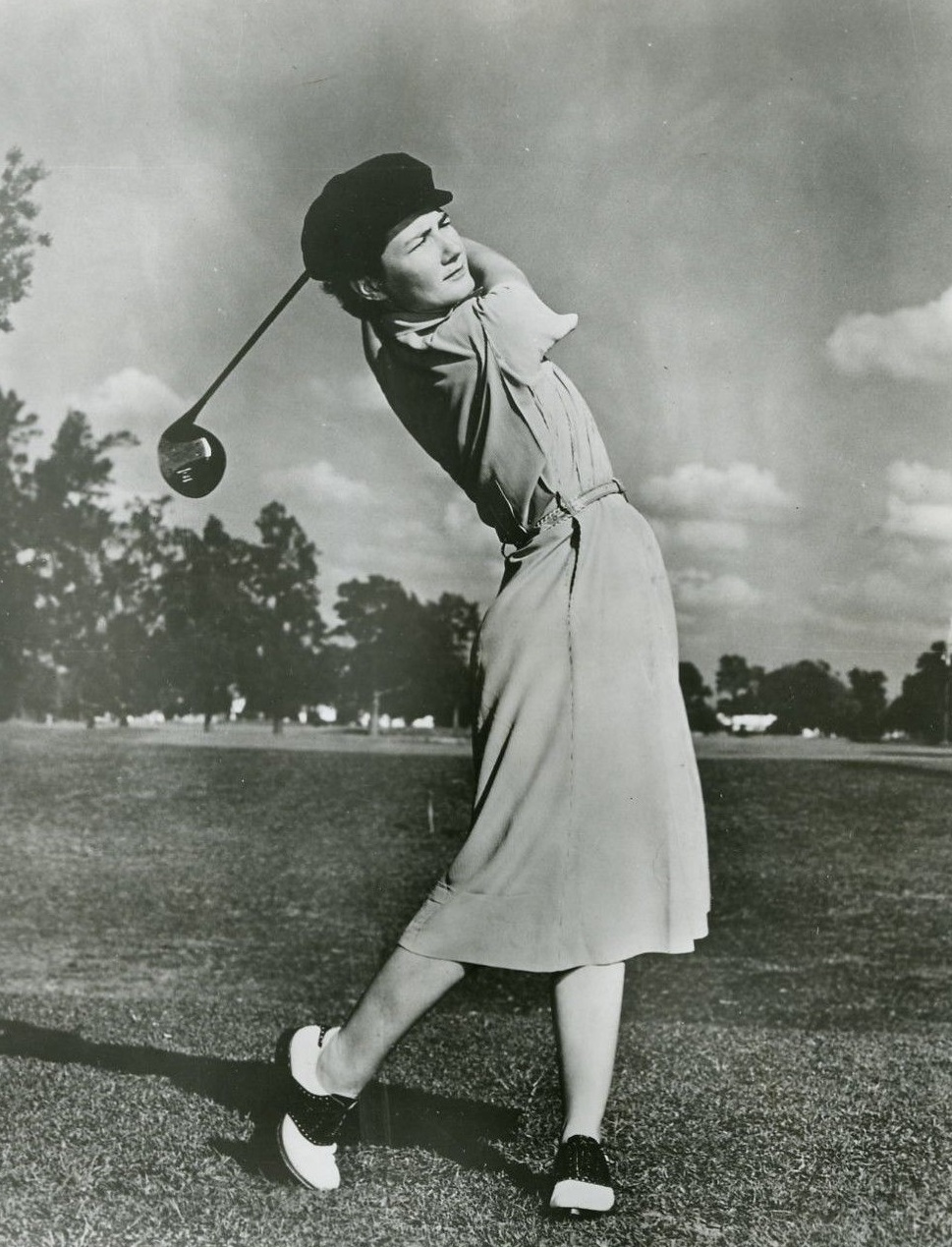
Golfer Louise Suggs

- Ken Sagoes, actor
- Emily Saliers, singer
- Hannah Salwen, author
- Kevin Salwen, author
- Junior Samples, comedian
- B. B. Sams, artist; born in South Carolina
- Mackey Sasser, baseball player
- Jeff Saturday, football player
- Morgan Saylor, actress; born in Chicago
- Hal Scardino, actor
- Diana Scarwid, actress
- Mary Schmich, columnist
- Chris Scott, football player
- Lindsay Scott, football player
- Richard T. Scott, artist
- Ryan Seacrest, television personality, host of American Idol since 2002 and co-host of Live with Kelly and Ryan since 2017
- Saycon Sengbloh, singer
- John H. Sengstacke, newspaper publisher
- Ken Shamrock, mixed martial artist
- Shannon Sharpe, football player and television commentator
- Sterling Sharpe, football player
- Shari Shattuck, actress
- Kelvin Sheppard, football player
- Sonny Shroyer, actor
- Philip T. Shutze, architect; born in Columbus
- Silentó, rapper
- Kobi Simmons (born 1997), basketball player for Maccabi Tel Aviv of the Israeli Basketball Premier League
- Louise Simonson, comic book author
- Harry Simpson, baseball player
- Jena Sims, actress, model
- Lucas Sims, baseball player
- IronE Singleton, actor
- Darius Slay, football player
- Sam Sloman (born 1997), NFL football player
- Kyle Sloter, football player
- Corey Smith, musician
- Daryl Smith, football player
- Josh Smith, basketball player
- Lillian Smith, author
- Marcus Smith, football player
- Nolan Smith, artist, musician
- Telvin Smith, football player
- Josh Smoker, baseball player
- Jacob Snider, inventor
- Troy Snitker, baseball coach
- Steven Soderbergh, film director
- Emily Sonnett, soccer player; USWNT/Gotham FC defender
- Reed Sorenson, NASCAR driver
- Moxley Sorrel, Civil War officer
- Soulja Boy, rapper; record producer; actor; born in Chicago
- Joe South, singer
- Southside, producer
- Bubba Sparxxx, rapper
- Takeo Spikes, football player
- Hollis Stacy, golfer
- Matthew Stafford, football player
- Laurence Stallings, playwright
- Kristian Stanfill, singer
- Brandon Stanton, blogger, photographer, founder of Humans of New York
- Alexander Stephens, vice president of the Confederate States of America; member of the House of Representatives; governor of Georgia
- Amin Stevens (born 1990), basketball player in the Israeli Basketball Premier League
- Ray Stevens, singer
- Dani Stevenson, singer
- Michael Stipe, musician (R.E.M.)
- Missouri H. Stokes, social reformer, writer
- Doug Stone, singer
- Hunter Strickland, baseball player
- KaDee Strickland, actress
- Keith Strickland, composer; multi-instrumentalist; founding member of the new wave band The B-52s
- A.J. Styles, professional wrestler
- Louise Suggs, golfer
- Sunny Suljic, actor
- Louis Wade Sullivan, educator; U.S. secretary of Health and Human Services
- Dansby Swanson, baseball player
- Pat Swilling, football player
- Teddy Swims, singer
- Bella French Swisher, writer, editor, publisher

== T ==
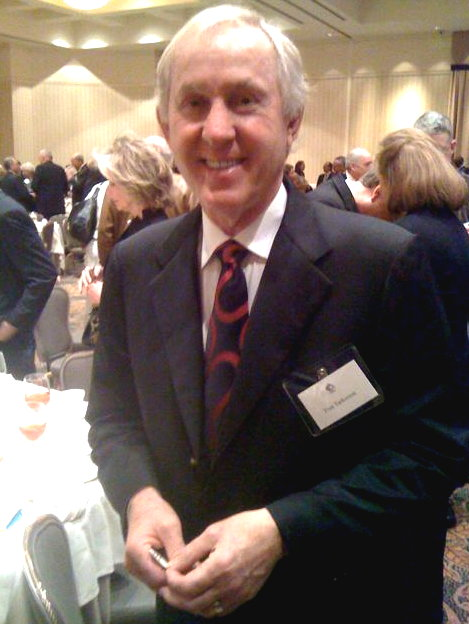
Football player Fran Tarkenton

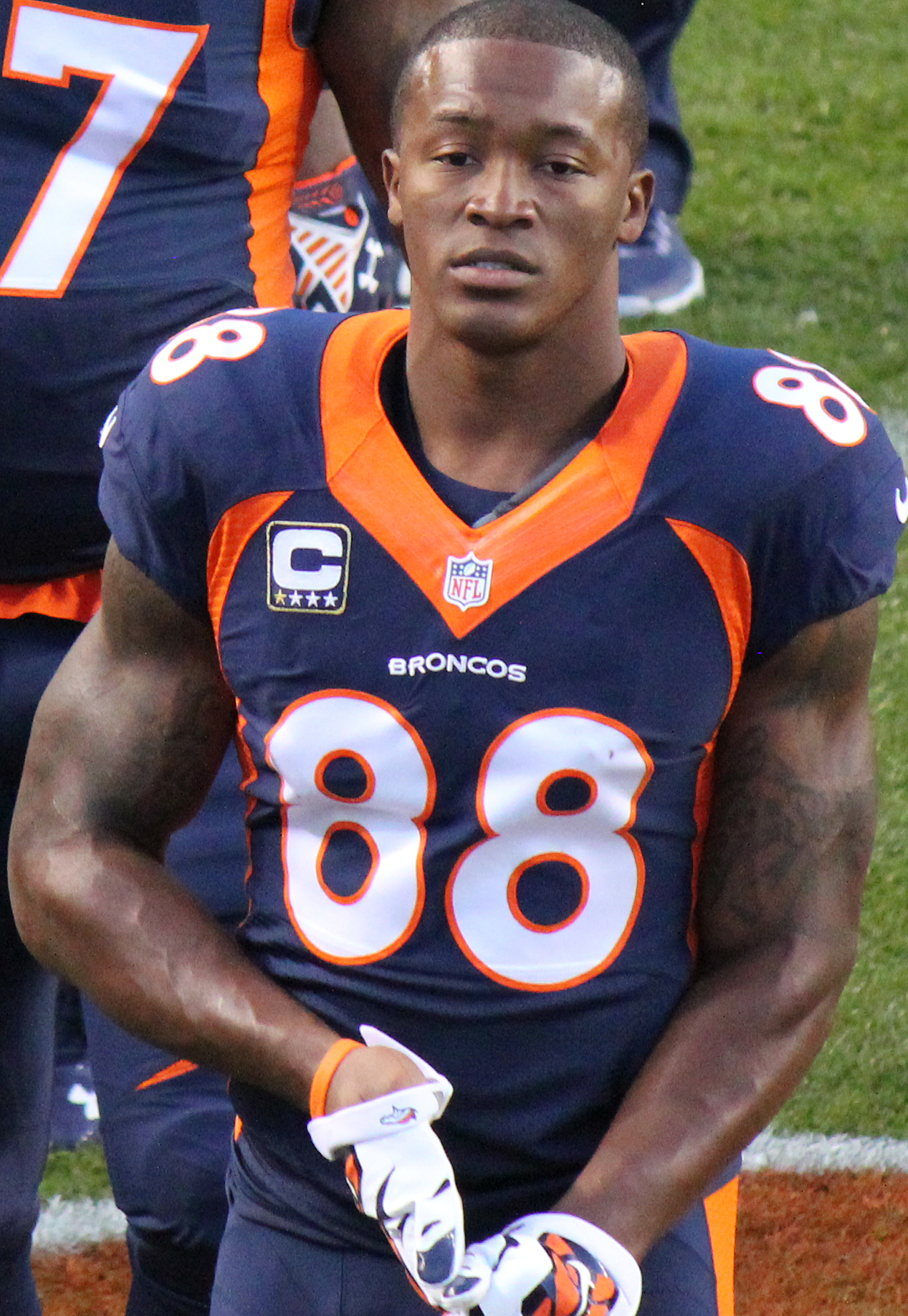
Football player Demaryius Thomas

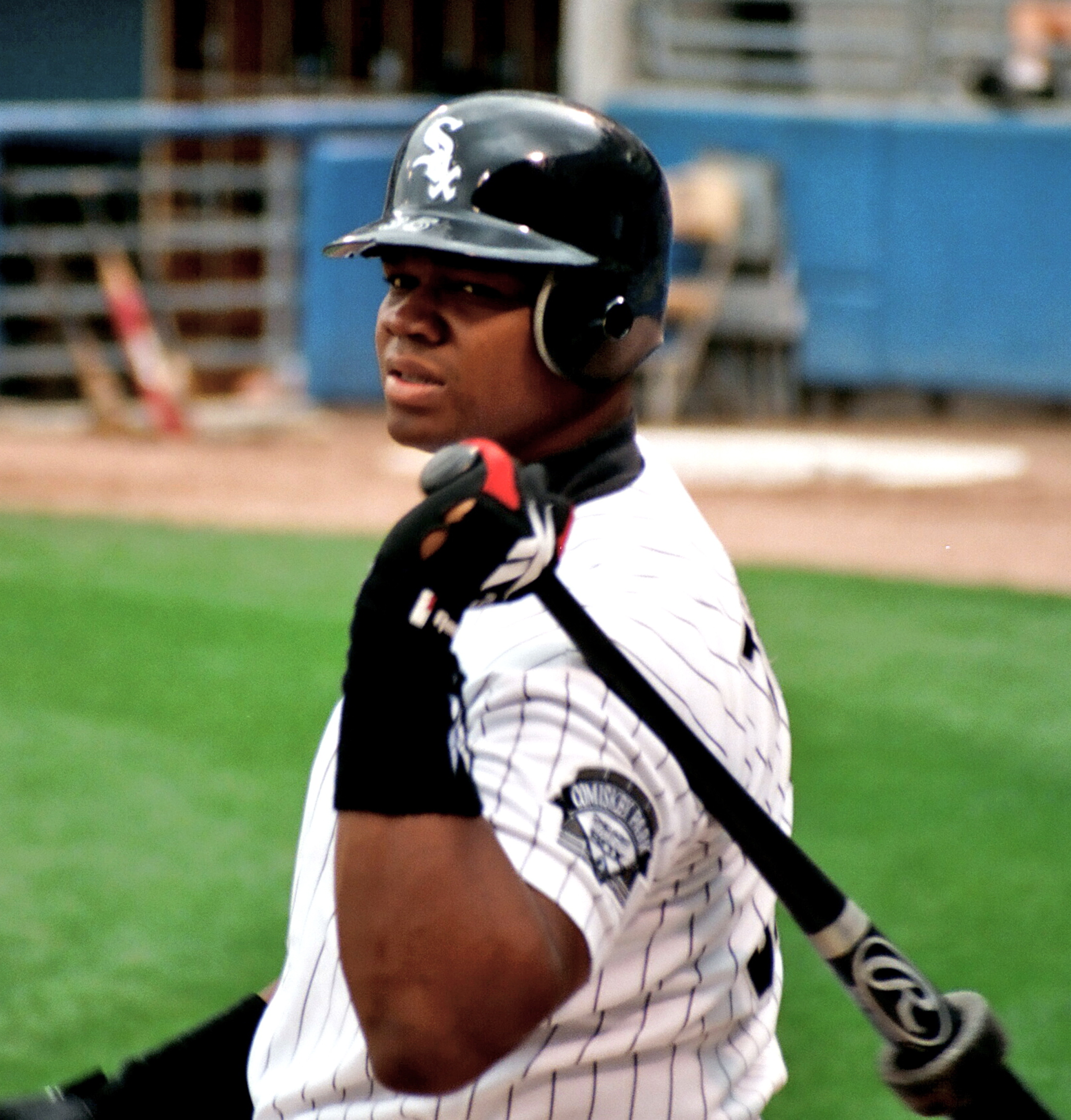
Baseball player Frank Thomas

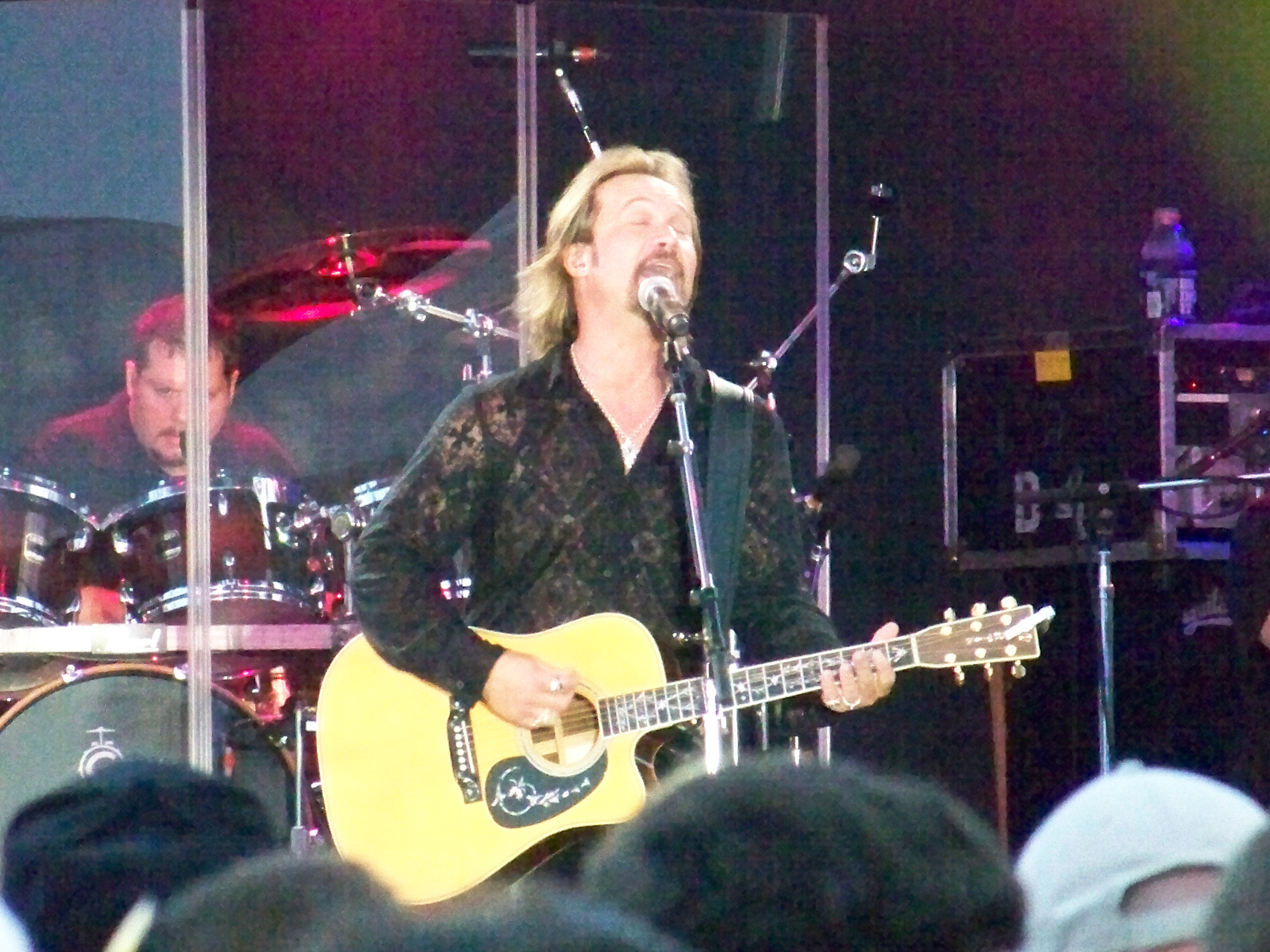
Musician Travis Tritt

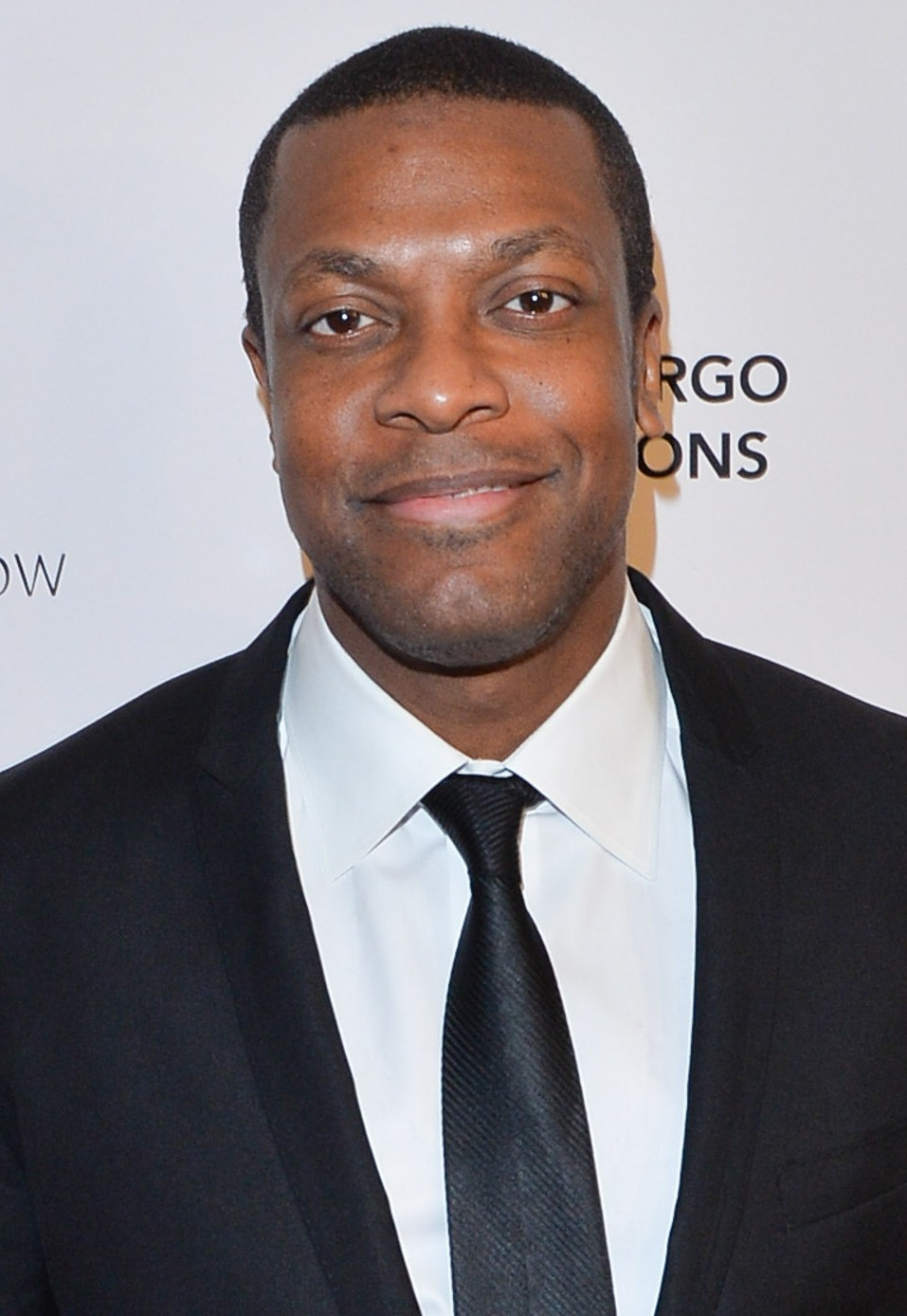
Actor Chris Tucker

- T.I., rapper
- Takeoff, rapper
- Fran Tarkenton, football player; born in Virginia
- Katelyn Tarver, actress and singer-songwriter
- Angelo Taylor, athlete, Olympic gold medalist, coach, suspended by SafeSport for sexual misconduct
- Cooper Taylor, football player
- Tut Taylor, musician
- Bex Taylor-Klaus, actress
- Doug Teper, businessman and politician
- Bill Terry, baseball player
- Austin Theory, professional wrestler (real name Austin White)
- Alma Thomas, painter
- Clarence Thomas, associate justice of the Supreme Court of the United States
- Demaryius Thomas, football player
- Frank Thomas, baseball player
- John Michael "Mickey" Thomas, singer
- Joshua Thomas, designer
- J. T. Thomas, football player
- Rozonda Thomas, singer
- Trey Thompkins, basketball player
- Juwan Thompson, football player; born in the U.S. Virgin Islands
- Kenan Thompson, comedian
- Cyndi Thomson, singer
- Al Thornton, basketball player
- Melanie Thornton, singer
- Lucas Till, actor
- Conrad Tillard (born 1964), politician, Baptist minister, radio host, author, and activist
- Dina Titus, Nevada congresswoman
- Bart Tobener, former auto racer
- Becca Tobin, actress
- Mike Tolbert, football player
- Dalvin Tomlinson, football player
- Peter Tompkins, journalist, WWII spy
- Robert Toombs, Civil War general
- Gwen Torrence, athlete
- Travis Tritt, musician
- Torell Troup, football player; born in Michigan
- Pastor Troy, rapper
- Chris Tucker, actor
- Jessie Tuggle, football player
- Stephon Tuitt, football player; born in Florida
- Forrest Turner, prison reform advocate
- Henry Ashby Turner, historian
- Robert Turner (born 1993), basketball player
- DeAngelo Tyson, football player

== U ==
- Devonte Upson (born 1993), basketball player in the Israeli Basketball Premier League
- James L. Usry, mayor of Atlantic City

== V ==
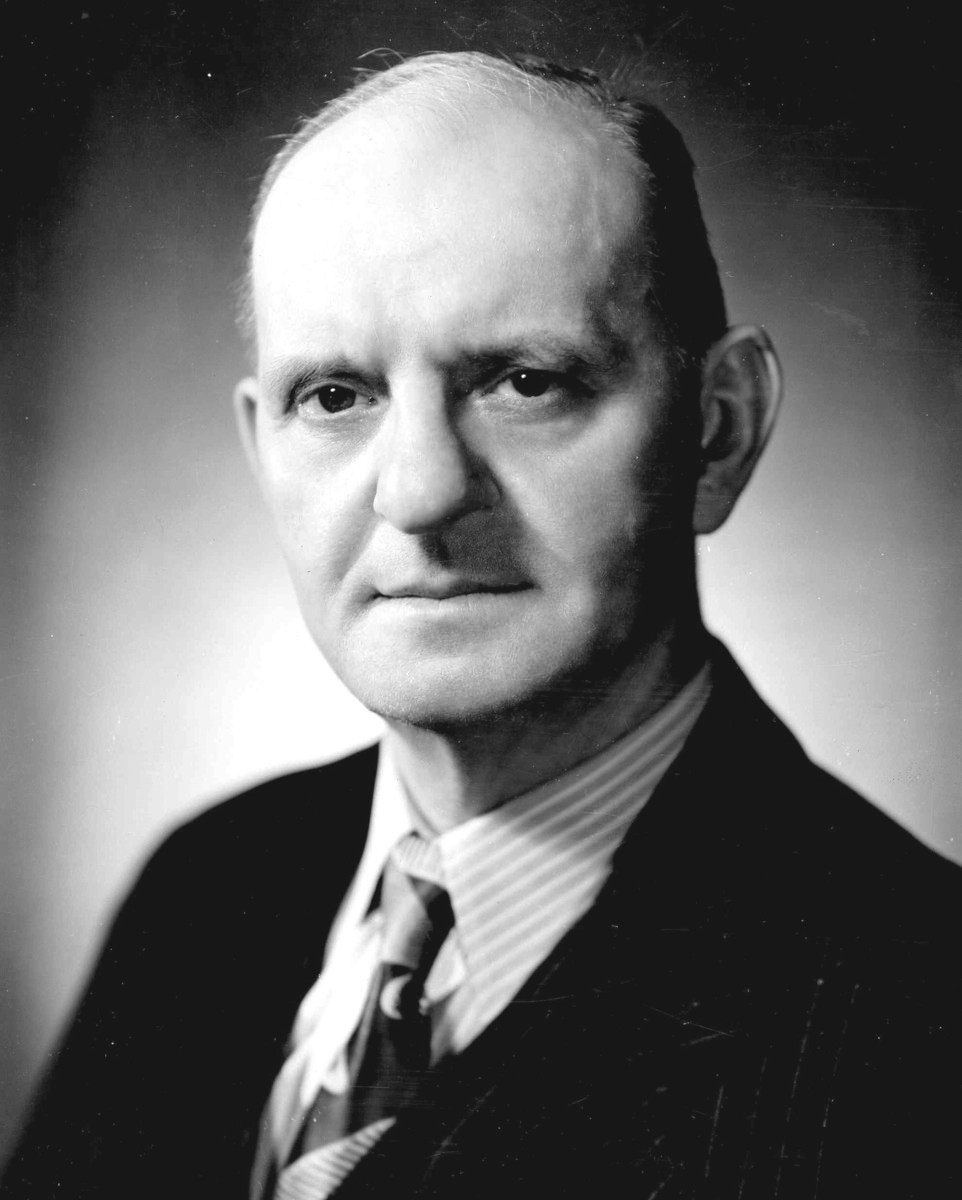
Congressman Carl Vinson

- Carlos Valdes, actor and singer
- Blake R. Van Leer, president of Georgia Tech, the first to admit women and fought against segregationist Governor Griffin
- Ella Lillian Wall Van Leer, artist and architect, women's rights activist
- Fernando Velasco, football player; born in New York
- Carl Vinson, U.S. representative, "father of the Two-Ocean Navy"
- Lenny Von Dohlen, actor

== W ==
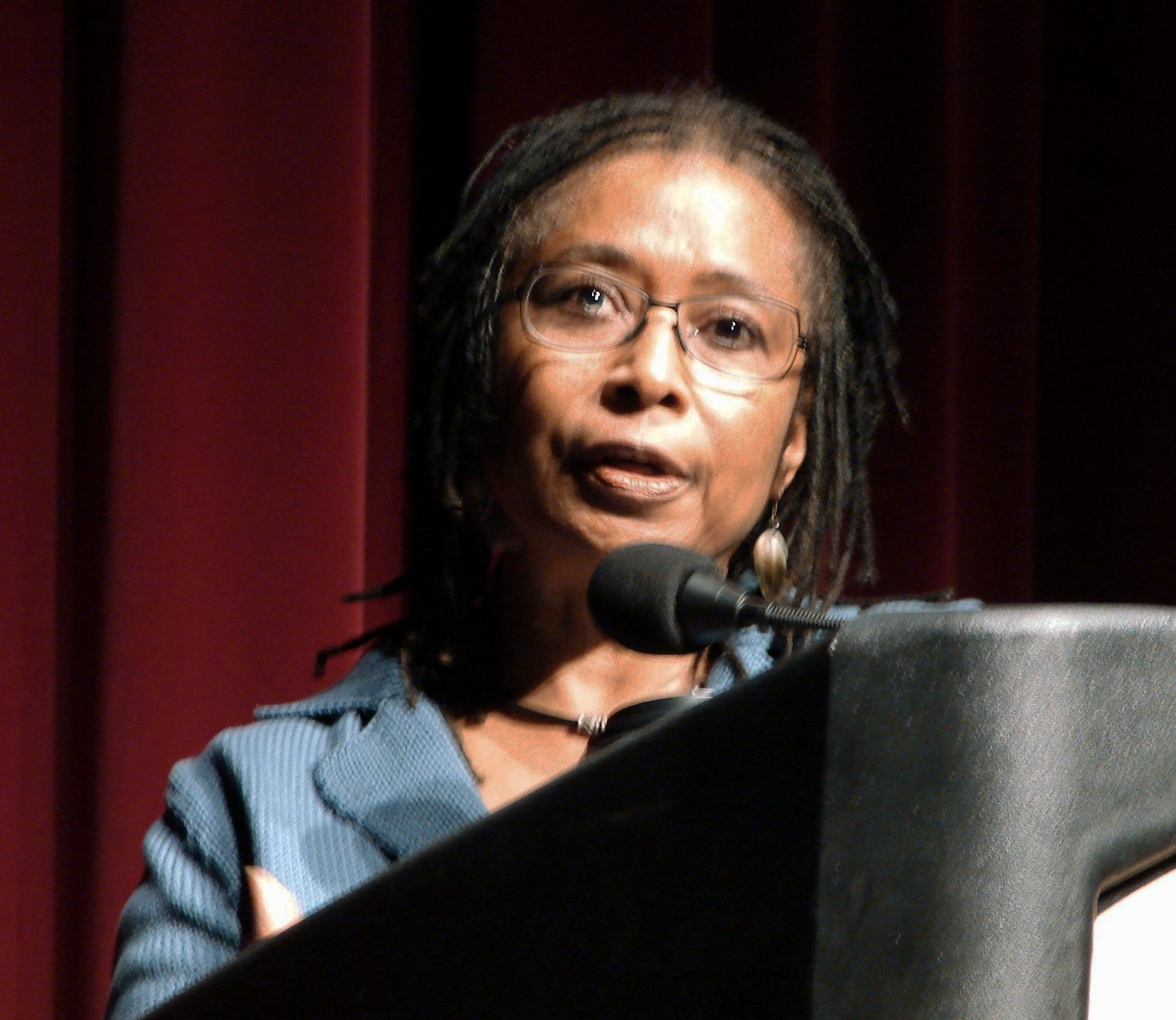
Author and activist Alice Walker

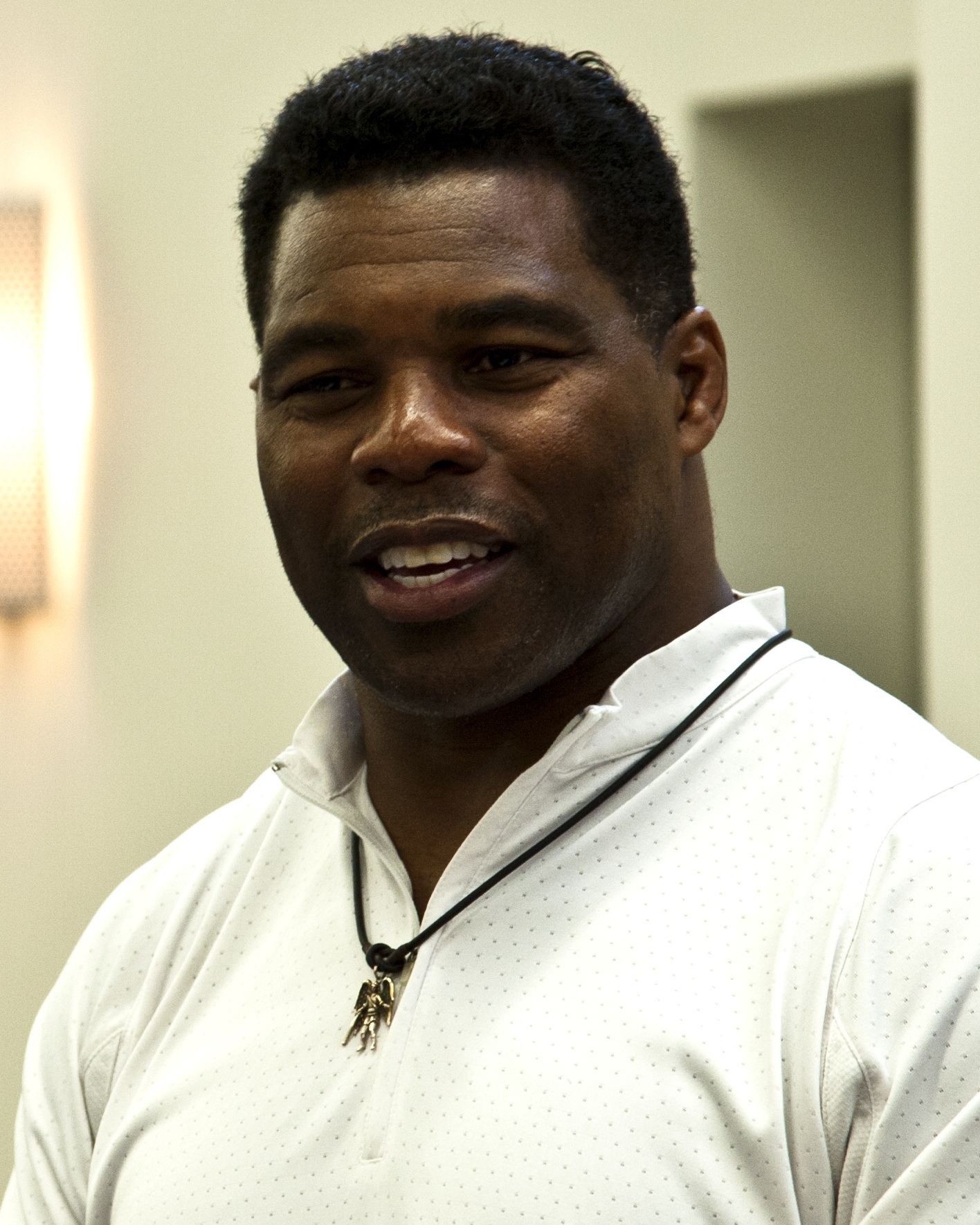
Football player Herschel Walker

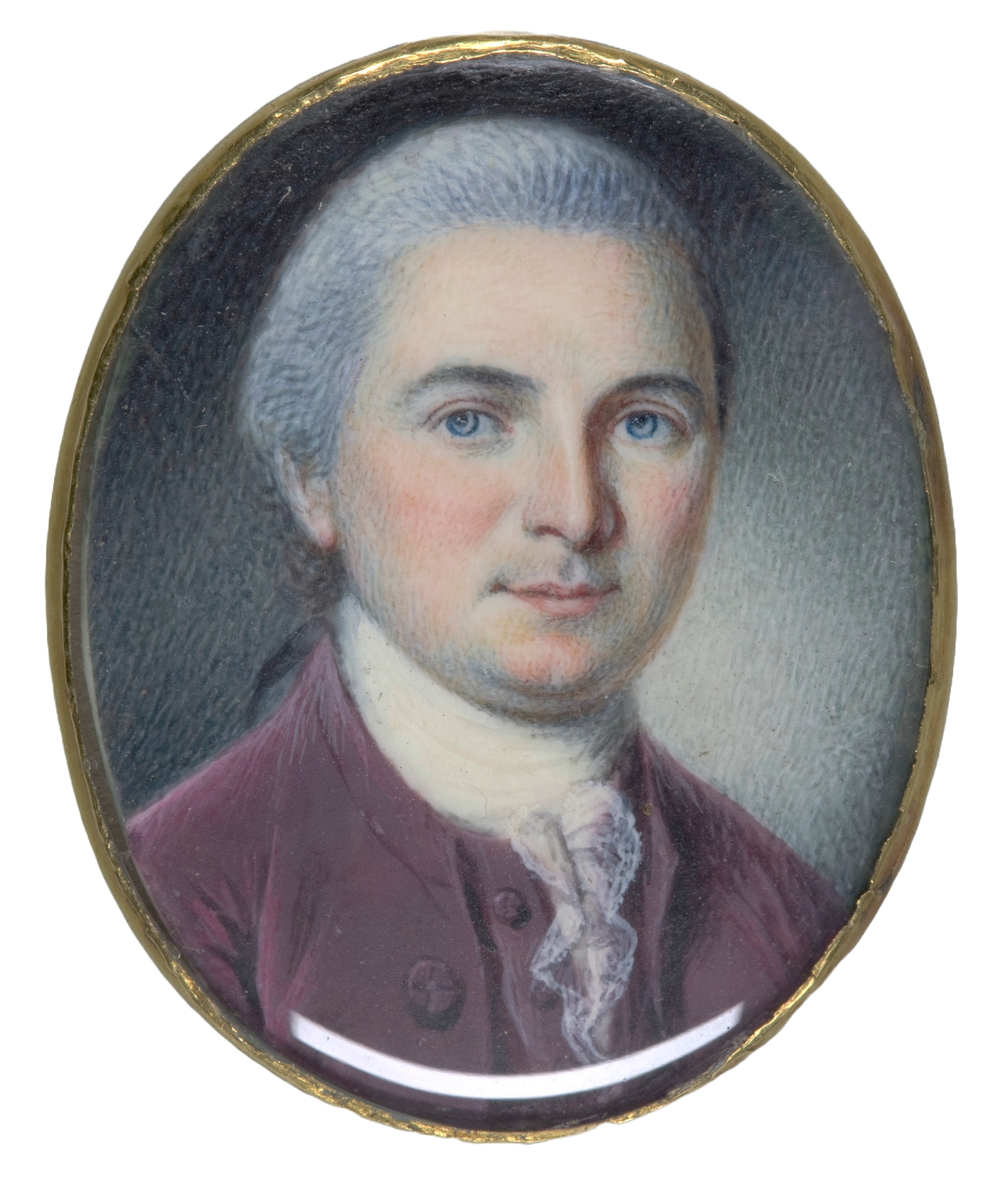
Statesman George Walton

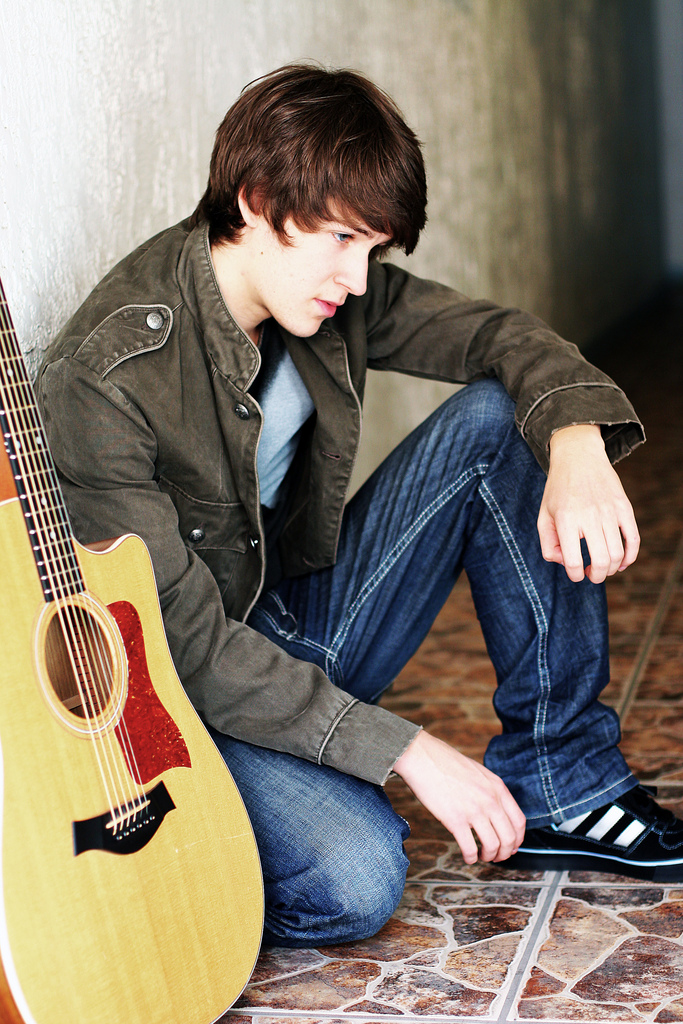
Actor and musician Devon Werkheiser

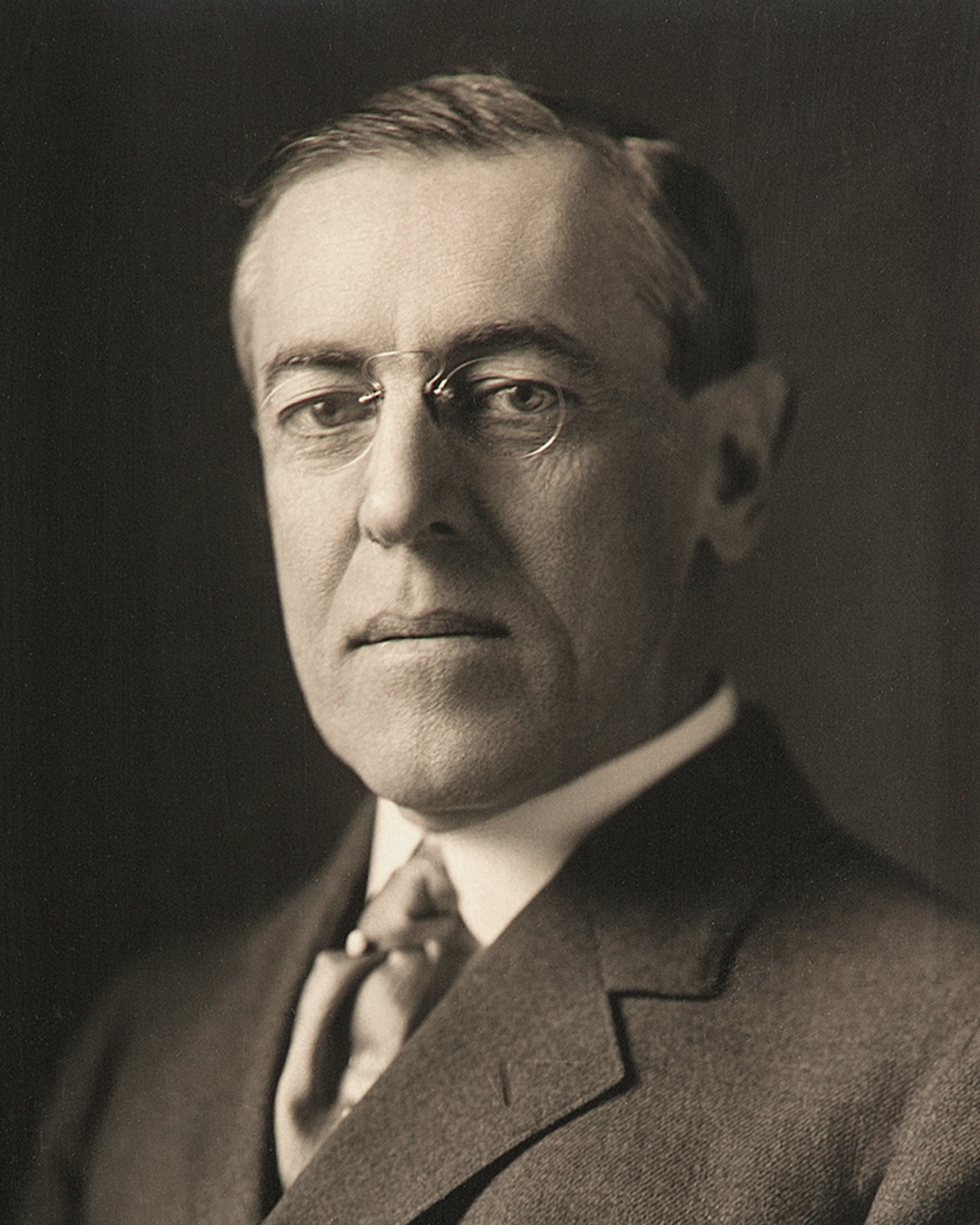
Former U.S. President Woodrow Wilson

- Adam Wainwright, baseball player
- Rick Waits, baseball player, pitching coach
- Waka Flocka Flame, rapper; born in New York City
- Erik Walden, football player
- Phil Walden, music producer
- Alice Walker, author
- Benjamin Walker, actor, stand-up comedian
- Butch Walker, musician
- Greg Walker, baseball player
- Herschel Walker, football player
- M. J. Walker (born 1998), basketball player in the Israeli Basketball Premier League and NBA
- Summer Walker, singer
- Travon Walker, football player
- Aria Wallace, actress
- Pierce Wallace, actor and television personality
- John Waller, musician
- Jeff Walls, musician
- George Walton, 18th century statesman and Founding Father of the United States
- Susan Walters, actress and model
- Hines Ward, football player; born in South Korea
- Matthias Ward, lawyer; U.S. senator from Texas
- DJ Ware, football player
- Raphael Warnock, U.S. senator
- Fredi Washington, actress
- Douglass Watson, actor
- James Moore Wayne, judge
- James Webb III (born 1993), basketball player for Maccabi Tel Aviv in the Israeli Basketball Premier League
- Keenan Webb, also known as DJ Suede the Remix God, music producer
- Spencer Wells, geneticist, anthropologist
- Devon Werkheiser, actor and musician
- John Wesley, Savannah theologian; born in the United Kingdom
- Allen West, politician
- Kanye West, recording artist; raised in Chicago, Illinois
- Mario West, basketball player; born in Alabama
- Jake Westbrook, baseball player
- Philip Wheeler, football player
- Zack Wheeler, baseball player
- Corey White, football player
- Mary Jarrett White, first woman to vote in the state of Georgia
- Naomi Whitehead, supercentenarian and the current oldest living person in the United States
- Charlie Whitehurst, football player; born in Wisconsin
- Steve Whitmire, puppeteer
- Eli Whitney, inventor; born in Massachusetts
- Laura Slade Wiggins, actress, singer, musician
- J. J. Wilcox, football player
- Dominique Wilkins, basketball player
- Gerald Wilkins, basketball player
- Ellis E. Williams, actor; comedian
- Gary Anthony Williams, comedian
- Louis Williams, basketball player; born in Tennessee
- Porsha Williams, TV personality
- Alicia Leigh Willis, actress
- Garry Wills, author, journalist, and historian
- Cindy Wilson, singer-songwriter; founding member of the new wave band The B-52s
- Ricky Wilson, guitarist; founding member of the new wave band The B-52s
- Scott Wilson, actor
- Woodrow Wilson, 28th president of the United States; raised in Augusta; practiced law in Atlanta
- Kitty Wilson-Evans, historical interpreter
- Blake Wood, baseball player
- Xavier Woods, professional wrestler
- Joanne Woodward, actress
- David McCord Wright, economist
- Lizz Wright, singer
- Rayfield Wright, Pro Hall of Fame football player
- Will Wright, game designer
- Jarius Wynn, football player

== Y ==
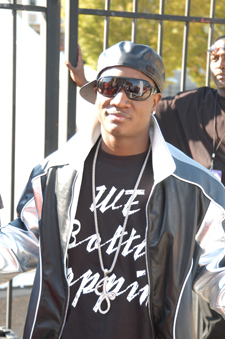
Rapper Yung Joc

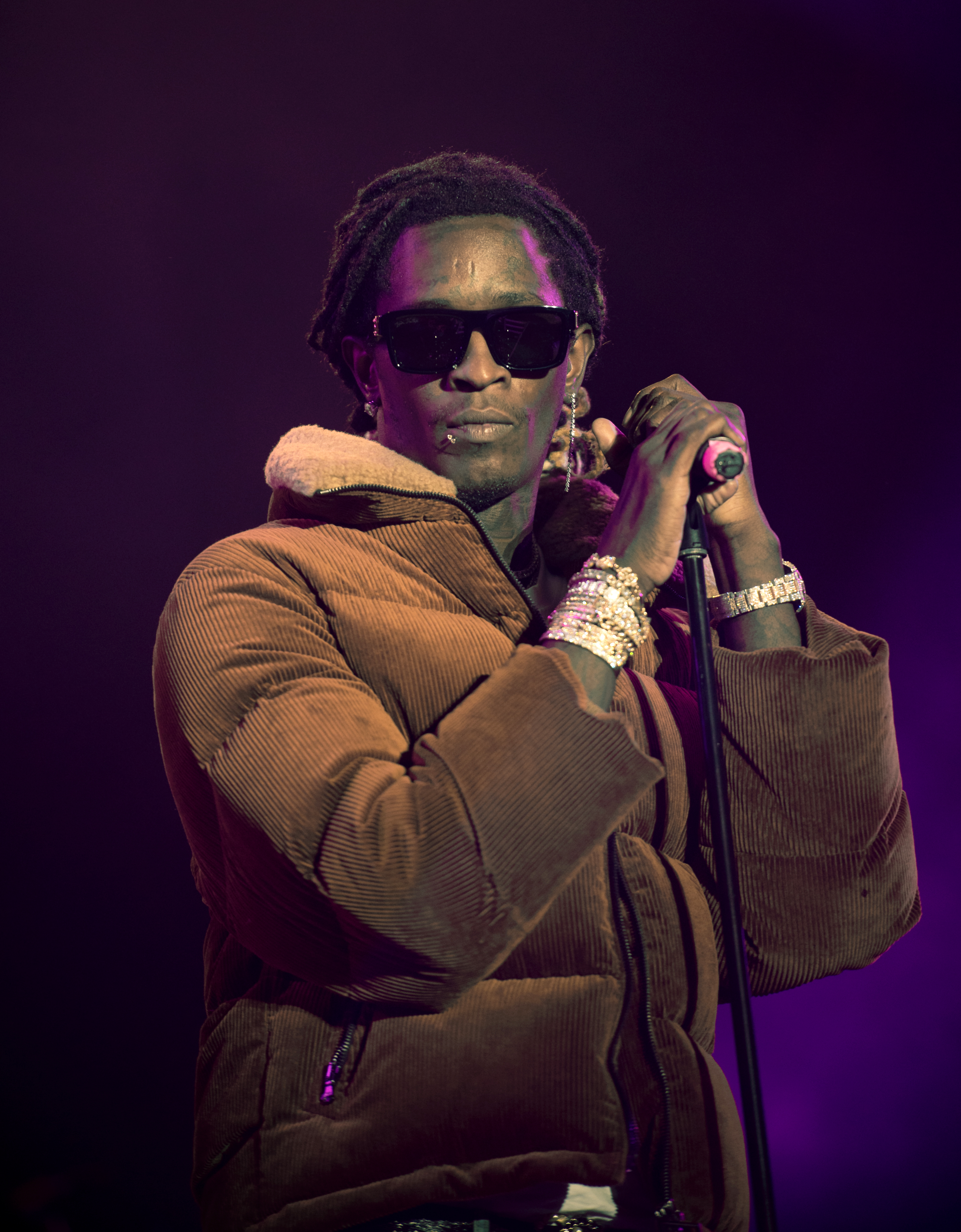
Rapper Young Thug

- Cassie Yates, actress
- Sally Yates, U.S. deputy attorney general
- Trisha Yearwood, singer
- Frank Yerby, writer
- Ying Yang Twins, hip-hop duo (Kaine (born Eric Jackson) and D-Roc (born De'Angelo Holmes))
- Young Dro, rapper
- Young Jeezy, rapper
- Young Thug, rapper

== See also ==
- List of people from Atlanta, Georgia
- List of people from Augusta, Georgia
- List of people from Savannah, Georgia
- List of United States representatives from Georgia
- List of United States senators from Georgia
- List of governors of Georgia
- List of Georgia suffragists
- List of people from Columbus, Georgia
- List of people from Macon, Georgia
