= New Zealand at the 1978 Commonwealth Games =

- CG code: NZL
- CGA: New Zealand Olympic and Commonwealth Games Association
- Website: www.olympic.org.nz

in Edmonton, Alberta, Canada
- Competitors: 102
- Flag bearer: Neil Lyster
- Officials: 32
- Medals Ranked 5th: Gold 5 Silver 6 Bronze 9 Total 20

Commonwealth Games appearances (overview)
- 1930; 1934; 1938; 1950; 1954; 1958; 1962; 1966; 1970; 1974; 1978; 1982; 1986; 1990; 1994; 1998; 2002; 2006; 2010; 2014; 2018; 2022; 2026; 2030

New Zealand at the 1978 Commonwealth Games was represented by a team of 102 competitors and 32 officials. Selection of the team for the Games in Edmonton, Canada, was the responsibility of the New Zealand Olympic and Commonwealth Games Association. New Zealand's flagbearer at the opening ceremony was cyclist Neil Lyster. The New Zealand team finished fifth on the medal table, winning a total of 20 medals, five of which were gold.

New Zealand has competed in every games, starting with the British Empire Games in 1930 at Hamilton, Ontario.

Nigeria boycotted the 1978 Games in protest at New Zealand's sporting contacts with apartheid-era South Africa.

== Medal tables ==
New Zealand was fifth on the medal table in 1978, with a total of 20 medals, including five gold.

Medal	Name	Sport	Event
Gold	Mike Richards	Cycling	Men's individual pursuit
Gold	John Woolley	Shooting	Open skeet
Gold	Gary Hurring	Swimming	Men's 200 m backstroke
Gold	Rebecca Perrott	Swimming	Women's 200 m freestyle
Gold	Precious McKenzie	Weightlifting	Men's bantamweight
Silver	Mike O'Rourke	Athletics	Men's javelin throw
Silver	Heather Thomson	Athletics	Women's 3000 m
Silver	Kevin Blackwell; Anthony Cuff; Neil Lyster; Jack Swart	Cycling	Men's team pursuit
Silver	David Baldwin; John Malcolm; Morgan Moffat; Phil Skoglund	Lawn bowls	Men's fours
Silver	Penny McCarthy	Swimming	Women's 100 m butterfly
Silver	Rebecca Perrott	Swimming	Women's 200 m individual medley
Bronze	George Stankovich	Boxing	Men's heavyweight
Bronze	Bryan Purser; Richard Purser	Badminton	Men's doubles
Bronze	Garry Bell	Cycling	Men's road race
Bronze	Lynette Brake; Rowena Davis; Kirsty Durward; Deborah Hurst	Gymnastics	Women's team
Bronze	Rebecca Perrott	Swimming	Women's 400 m freestyle
Bronze	Rebecca Perrott	Swimming	Women's 800 m freestyle
Bronze	Brian Marsden	Weightlifting	Men's middle heavyweight
Bronze	Phillip Sue	Weightlifting	Men's lightweight
Bronze	Murray Avery	Wrestling	Men's heavyweight

Medals by sport
Sport	Gold medal	Silver medal	Bronze medal	Total
Swimming	2	2	2	6
Cycling	1	1	1	3
Weightlifting	1	0	2	3
Shooting	1	0	0	1
Athletics	0	2	0	2
Lawn bowls	0	1	0	1
Boxing	0	0	1	1
Badminton	0	0	1	1
Gymnastics	0	0	1	1
Wrestling	0	0	1	1
Total	5	6	9	20

Medals by gender
Gender	Gold medal	Silver medal	Bronze medal	Total
Male	3	3	6	12
Female	1	3	3	7
Mixed / open	1	0	0	1
Total	5	6	9	20

== Competitors ==
The following table lists the number of New Zealand competitors participating at the Games according to gender and sport.

Sport	Men	Women	Total
Athletics	19	9	28
Badminton	4	3	7
Boxing	6	—N/a	6
Cycling	12	—N/a	12
Diving	1	1	2
Gymnastics	4	4	8
Lawn bowls	7	—N/a	7
Shooting	10	0	10
Swimming	5	4	9
Weightlifting	6	—N/a	6
Wrestling	7	—N/a	7
Total	81	21	102

== Athletics ==
=== Track and road ===
Athlete	Event	Heat		Quarterfinal		Semifinal		Final	
Athlete	Event	Result	Rank (Note: Ranks given are within the heat)	Result	Rank (Note: Ranks given are within the quarterfinal)	Result	Rank (Note: Ranks given are within the semifinal)	Result	Rank
Paul Ballinger	Men's marathon	—N/a						2:17:46	6
Wendy Brown	Women's 100 m	11.84	4	—N/a		did not advance			
Wendy Brown	Women's 200 m	23.77	3 Q	—N/a		23.64	5	did not advance	
Rod Dixon	Men's 1500 m	3:39.03	3 Q	—N/a				3:41.34	8
Rod Dixon	Men's 5000 m	14:08.02	2 Q	—N/a				13:43.69	8
Graeme French	Men's 100 m	10.94	4 Q	10.98	8	did not advance			
Howard Healey	Men's 3000 m steeplechase	8:48.4	4 Q	—N/a				8:43.75	5
Penny Hunt	Women's 200 m	24.25	4	—N/a		did not advance			
Penny Hunt	Women's 400 m	54.53	4 Q	—N/a		54.26	7	did not advance	
Terry Manners	Men's marathon	—N/a						2:23:00	13
Phillip Mills	Men's 110 m hurdles	14.32	4 q	—N/a				14.09	6
Phillip Mills	Men's 400 m hurdles	53.78	5 q	—N/a		50.92	4 Q	52.01	8
Dennis Norris	Men's 800 m	1:51.5	3 Q	—N/a		1:50.77	5	did not advance	
Dennis Norris	Men's 1500 m	3:45.96	8	—N/a				did not advance	
Mike Parker	Men's 30 km walk	—N/a						DNF	
Ross Pownall	Men's 110 m hurdles	14.36	3 Q	—N/a				14.18	7
Dick Quax	Men's 5000 m	DNS		—N/a				did not advance	
Dick Quax	Men's 10,000 m	—N/a						29:58.00	9
Euan Robertson	Men's 3000 m steeplechase	8:53.1	3 Q	—N/a				8:41.32	4
Kim Robertson	Women's 100 m	11.67	2 Q	—N/a		11.63	5	did not advance	
Kim Robertson	Women's 200 m	23.38	3 Q	—N/a		23.59	6	did not advance	
Kevin Ryan	Men's marathon	—N/a						2:17:16	4
Graham Seatter	Men's 30 km walk	—N/a						2:31:49	7
Bevan Smith	Men's 200 m	21.62	4 Q	21.60	6	did not advance			
Bevan Smith	Men's 400 m	48.02	4 Q	46.77	4 q	48.25	8	did not advance	
Heather Thomson	Women's 3000 m	—N/a						9:20.69	2nd place, silver medalist(s)
Alan Thurlow	Men's 5000 m	14:27.19	8 q	—N/a				DNF	
Alan Thurlow	Men's 10,000 m	—N/a						30:05.24	10
Gail Wooten	Women's 100 m hurdles	14.14	4 q	—N/a				13.77	5
Alison Wright	Women's 800 m	2:07.7	2 Q	—N/a		2:06.71	6	did not advance	
Alison Wright	Women's 1500 m	4:17.03	2 Q	—N/a				4:12.93	6
Bevan Smith; Graeme French; Phillip Mills; Ross Pownall	Men's 4 × 100 m relay	41.40	5	—N/a				did not advance	
Gail Wooten; Kim Robertson; Penny Hunt; Wendy Brown	Women's 4 × 100 m relay	—N/a						45.06	4

=== Field ===
Athlete	Event	Qualifying		Final	
Athlete	Event	Result	Rank	Result	Rank
Noeline Hodgins	Women's long jump		Q	5.86 m	11
Mike O'Rourke	Men's javelin throw	—N/a		83.18 m	2nd place, silver medalist(s)
Robin Tait	Men's discus throw	—N/a		55.22 m	4
Phil Wood	Men's triple jump		Q	16.05 m	6

=== Combined ===
Men's decathlon

Athlete	100 m	Long jump	Shot put	High jump	400 m	110 m hurdles	Discus throw	Pole vault	Javelin throw	1500 m	Overall points	Rank
Robert Sadler	11.42	6.87 m	12.28 m	1.95 m	51.87	15.93	36.66 m	4.40 m	42.10 m	4:20.1	7117 pts	7

Women's pentathlon

Athlete	100 m hurdles	Shot put	High jump	Long jump	200 m	Overall points	Rank
Barbara Beable						3989 pts	7
Karen Page						4099 pts	5

== Badminton ==
=== Singles ===
Athlete	Event	Round of 64	Round of 32	Round of 16	Quarterfinal	Semifinal	Final / BM	Rank
Athlete	Event	Opposition Result	Opposition Result	Opposition Result	Opposition Result	Opposition Result	Opposition Result	Rank
Alison Branfield	Women's singles	Cain (IOM); W 11–0 11–0	Irwin (AUS); W 11–8 11–5	Bridge (ENG); L 3–11 3–11	did not advance			
Mary Livingston	Women's singles	Bye	Blake (WAL); W 11–6 11–3	Beckett (ENG); L 7–11 6–11	did not advance			
Ross Livingston	Men's singles	Bye	Maini (KEN); W 15–7 15–2	Jolly (ENG); W 18–16 15–11	Leong (MAL); L 7–15 2–15	did not advance		
Bryan Purser	Men's singles	Lim (WAL); W 15–7 15–9	Ganguli (IND); L 8–15 15–6 12–15	did not advance				
Richard Purser	Men's singles	Cooper (AUS); W 18–13 15–7	Evans (NIR); W 15–3 15–1	Priestman (CAN); W 15–13 15–4	Padukone (IND); L 1–15 8–15	did not advance		
Allison Sinton	Women's singles	Bye	Swaby (AUS); L 5–11 8–11	did not advance				
Steve Wilson	Men's singles	Mwangi (KEN); W 15–1 15–7	Modi (IND); L 6–15 7–15	did not advance				

=== Doubles ===
Athlete	Event	Round of 64	Round of 32	Round of 16	Quarterfinal	Semifinal	Final / BM	Rank
Athlete	Event	Opposition Result	Opposition Result	Opposition Result	Opposition Result	Opposition Result	Opposition Result	Rank
Ross Livingston; Steve Wilson	Men's doubles	—N/a	Padukone / Pawar (IND); L 9–15 5–15	did not advance				
Bryan Purser; Richard Purser	Men's doubles	—N/a	Bye	Czich / McKee (CAN); W 15–12 15–5	Selvaraj / Abu Bakar (MAL); W 15–9 15–8	Stevens / Tredgett (ENG); L 5–15 8–15	Jolly / Talbot (ENG); W 15–10 11–15 15–1	3rd place, bronze medalist(s)
Alison Branfield; Mary Livingston	Women's doubles	—N/a		Johnstone / Hamilton (SCO); L 6–15 11–15	did not advance			
Alison Branfield; Richard Purser	Mixed doubles	Bye	Hamilton / Travers (SCO); W 15–10 15–5	Singh / Pawar (IND); W 15–12 15–4	Clarkson / Carter (CAN); W 15–7 15–12	Perry / Tredgett (ENG); L 5–15 2–15	Sutton / Talbot (ENG); L 9–15 9–15	4
Mary Livingston; Ross Livingston	Mixed doubles	Bye	Falardeau / Priestman (CAN); W 15–18 15–7 15–7	Perry / Tredgett (ENG); L 9–15 0–15	did not advance			
Allison Sinton; Bryan Purser	Mixed doubles	Bye	Brimble / Lim (WAL); W 15–7 15–10	Flockhart / Gilliland (SCO); L 4–15 1–15	did not advance			

=== Teams ===
Athlete	Event	Group stage				Semifinal	Final / BM	Rank
Athlete	Event	Opposition Result	Opposition Result	Opposition Result	Opposition Result	Opposition Result	Opposition Result	Rank
Alison Branfield; Ross Livingston; Mary Livingston; Bryan Purser; Richard Purser; Allison Sinton; Steve Wilson	Mixed team	India; L 2–3	Australia; W 3–2	Wales; W 5–0	England; L 5–0	Canada; L 2–3	Malaysia; L 1–4	4

== Boxing ==
Athlete	Event	Round of 32	Round of 16	Quarterfinal	Semifinal	Final	Rank
Athlete	Event	Opposition Result	Opposition Result	Opposition Result	Opposition Result	Opposition Result	Rank
Gaulua Folasi	Light welterweight	—N/a	Cameron (JAM); W	Mwangi (KEN); L	did not advance		
David Jackson	Welterweight	Bye	Feal (WAL); L	did not advance			
Ronald Jackson	Light middleweight	—N/a	Bye	Samu (SAM); L	did not advance		
Perry Rackley	Middleweight	—N/a	Parkes (ENG); L	did not advance			
Dean Rackley	Light heavyweight	—N/a	—N/a	Smith (ENG); L	did not advance		
George Stankovich	Heavyweight	—N/a	—N/a	Kabegi (KEN); W	Awome (ENG); L	Did not advance	3rd place, bronze medalist(s)

== Cycling ==
=== Road ===
Men's road race

Athlete	Time	Rank
Garry Bell	4:22:35.06	3rd place, bronze medalist(s)
Stephen Cox	4:23:47.91	18
Vern Hanaray	4:23:48.61	20
Blair Stockwell	4:35:08.10	30

=== Track ===
Men's 1000 m sprint

Athlete	Round 1	First-round repechages	Round 2	Second-round repechages		Quarterfinals	Semifinals	Final / BM	Rank
Athlete	Round 1	First-round repechages	Round 2	Heat	Final	Quarterfinals	Semifinals	Final / BM	Rank
Athlete	Opposition Result	Opposition Result	Opposition Result	Opposition Result	Opposition Result	Opposition Result	Opposition Result	Opposition Result	Rank
Mike Fabish	Turtur (AUS); Benjamin (SKN); 3	Pile (BAR); W 12.08	Swinnerton (ENG); Boyle (AUS); W 11.76	Bye		Tucker (AUS); L, L	did not advance		7
Eric McKenzie	Weller (JAM); Singh (IND); 2	Watkins (CAN); W 12.40	Gadd (ENG); Tudor (WAL); 3	Le Grys (ENG); Gardiner (TTO); W 12.05	Rawlins (TTO); L	did not advance			
Kevin McComb	Singleton (CAN); Shearer (NIR); 2	Greenidge (BAR); W WO	Weller (JAM); Le Grys (ENG); 3	Singh (IND); Boyle (AUS); 3	did not advance				

Men's tandem 2000 m sprint

Athletes	Qualification		Semifinals	Final / BM	Rank
Athletes	Time	Rank	Opposition Result	Opposition Result	Rank
Mike Fabish; Eric McKenzie	10.37	1 Q	Gadd / Le Grys (ENG); L (conceded after fall)	Boyle / Goodall (AUS); L WO	4

Men's 1 km time trial

Athlete	Time	Rank
Anthony Cuff	1:08.85	8
Mike Fabish	1:08.75	7
Mike Richards	1:08.99	9

Men's 4000 m pursuit

Athlete	Event	Qualification		Quarterfinals	Semifinals	Final / BM	Rank
Athlete	Event	Time	Rank	Opponent Result	Opponent Result	Opponent Result	Rank
Mike Richards	Individual pursuit	5:01.61	5 Q	Sutton (AUS); W 4:50.50	Hayman (CAN); W OVL	Campbell (AUS); W 4:49.74	1st place, gold medalist(s)
Jack Swart	Individual pursuit	5:02.88	6 Q	Doyle (ENG); L	Did not advance		
Kevin Blackwell; Anthony Cuff; Neil Lyster; Jack Swart	Team pursuit	4:35.30	2 Q	—N/a	England; W 4:36.70	Australia; L	2nd place, silver medalist(s)

Men's 10 miles scratch race

Athlete	Time	Rank
Anthony Cuff	20:06.45	6
Neil Lyster	20:06.70	10
Mike Richards	20:08.40	18

== Diving ==
Athlete	Event	Points	Rank
Ann Fargher	Women's 3 m springboard	341.16	7
Graeme Shaw	Men's 3 m springboard	404.94	10

== Gymnastics ==
=== Men ===
Athlete	Event	Apparatus						Total	Rank
Athlete	Event	F	PH	R	V	PB	HB	Total	Rank
Neil Davies	Individual all-around	8.55	8.40	7.95	9.00	8.75	8.50	51.15	13
Gregory Robertson	Individual all-around	8.45	8.15	7.75	8.95	8.95	7.20	49.45	14
Terry Sale	Individual all-around	9.00	8.60	8.90	9.20	8.90	8.85	53.45	6
Richard Wilkins	Individual all-around	8.05	8.35	7.70	7.25	8.35	8.00	47.70	16
Neil Davies; Gregory Robertson; Terry Sale; Richard Wilkins	Team all-around							154.00	4

=== Women ===
Athlete	Event	Apparatus				Total	Rank
Athlete	Event	V	UB	BB	F	Total	Rank
Lynette Brake	Individual all-around					32.950	17
Rowena Davis	Individual all-around	9.30	9.10	8.80	8.70	35.900	9
Kirsty Durward	Individual all-around	9.55	8.60	8.30	9.15	35.600	10
Deborah Hurst	Individual all-around	9.10	9.15	8.85	8.85	35.950	8
Lynette Brake; Rowena Davis; Kirsty Durward; Deborah Hurst	Team all-around					106.350	3rd place, bronze medalist(s)

== Lawn bowls ==
Athlete	Event	Round robin															Rank
Athlete	Event	Opposition Score	Opposition Score	Opposition Score	Opposition Score	Opposition Score	Opposition Score	Opposition Score	Opposition Score	Opposition Score	Opposition Score	Opposition Score	Opposition Score	Opposition Score	Opposition Score	Opposition Score	Rank
Kerry Clark	Men's singles	Gosden (KEN); W 21–5	Turner (MAW); W 21–13	Woodhard (GUE); W 21–11	Snell (AUS); L 18–21	Bryant (ENG); L 12–21	Evans (WAL); L 14–21	Green (SWZ); W 21–4	Madden (PNG); L 20–21	Tolova’a (SAM); W 21–13	Espie (NIR); W 21–15	Harakh (FIJ); W 21–6	McGill (SCO); W 21–18	McKernan (JER); W 21–11	Matheson (CAN); L 18–21	Souza (HKG); W 21–4	4
Ivan Kostanich; Bob McDonald	Men's pairs	Canada; L 12–28	Hong Kong; L 16–23	Bye	Western Samoa; W 27–12	England; D 19–19	Australia; L 17–19	Fiji; W 21–14	Northern Ireland; W 23–22	Wales; W 21–20	Swaziland; W 35–12	Papua New Guinea; W 22–13	Kenya; W 24–15	Scotland; L 18–27	Malawi; W 31–15	Bye	6
David Baldwin; John Malcolm; Morgan Moffat; Phil Skoglund	Men's fours	Australia; W 17–15	Northern Ireland; L 16–25	Bye	Scotland; W 23–22	England; W 19–18	Fiji; W 21–13	Guernsey; L 23–25	Papua New Guinea; W 33–17	Kenya; W 27–11	Canada; W 26–16	Western Samoa; W 32–8	Hong Kong; W 23–16	Wales; D 19–19	Zambia; W 29–14	Swaziland; W 25–14	2nd place, silver medalist(s)

== Shooting ==
=== Pistol ===
Athlete	Event	Points	Rank
Bruce McMillan	Open rapid-fire pistol	573	7
Barry O'Neale	Open rapid-fire pistol	557	13
Barrie Wickins	Open free pistol	532	9

=== Rifle ===
Athlete	Event	Points	Rank
Ian Ballinger	Open small-bore rifle	1185	7
Maurie Gordon	Open full-bore rifle	384	6
John Hastie	Open full-bore rifle	376	19
Brian Lacey	Open small-bore rifle	1178	15

=== Shotgun ===
Athlete	Event	Points	Rank
Brian Cumings	Open trap	155	16
Bruce Lassen	Open trap	177	5
John Woolley	Open skeet	193	1st place, gold medalist(s)

== Swimming ==
Athlete	Event	Heat		Final	
Athlete	Event	Result	Rank	Result	Rank
Ian Bullock	Men's 100 m backstroke	1:00.26	9	did not advance	
Ian Bullock	Men's 200 m backstroke	2:08.81	6 Q	2:09.24	8
Andrea Hawcridge	Women's 100 m backstroke	1:06.86	10	did not advance	
Andrea Hawcridge	Women's 200 m individual medley	2:24.09	8 Q	2:27.07	8
Gary Hurring	Men's 200 m backstroke	2:08.42	4 Q	2:04.37 GR	1st place, gold medalist(s)
Melanie Jones	Women's 100 m backstroke	1:06.61	9	did not advance	
Melanie Jones	Women's 200 m backstroke	2:20.35	6 Q	2:21.20	7
Penny McCarthy	Women's 100 m butterfly	1:03.53	5 Q	1:02.27	2nd place, silver medalist(s)
Penny McCarthy	Women's 200 m butterfly	2:17.65	9	did not advance	
Brett Naylor	Men's 100 m freestyle	53.94	19	did not advance	
Brett Naylor	Men's 200 m freestyle	1:58.36	12	did not advance	
Brett Naylor	Men's 400 m freestyle	4:03.22	5 Q	4:03.59	6
Rebecca Perrott	Women's 200 m freestyle	2:04.66	2 Q	2:00.63 CR	1st place, gold medalist(s)
Rebecca Perrott	Women's 400 m freestyle	4:16.12	2 Q	4:16.70	3rd place, bronze medalist(s)
Rebecca Perrott	Women's 800 m freestyle	9:03.34	4 Q	8:44.87	3rd place, bronze medalist(s)
Rebecca Perrott	Women's 200 m individual medley	2:20.23	2 Q	2:18.70	2nd place, silver medalist(s)
Paul Rowe	Men's 100 m freestyle	53.63	14	did not advance	
Paul Rowe	Men's 100 m butterfly	57.22	6 Q	56.61	4
Barry Salisbury	Men's 100 m freestyle	53.89	=17	did not advance	
Barry Salisbury	Men's 200 m freestyle	2:00.54	15	did not advance	
Barry Salisbury; Brett Naylor; Ian Bullock; Paul Rowe	Men's 4 × 100 m freestyle relay	—N/a		3:35.53	5
Barry Salisbury; Ian Bullock; Brett Naylor; Paul Rowe	Men's 4 × 200 m freestyle relay	—N/a		7:52.00	5
Andrea Hawcridge; Melanie Jones; Penny McCarthy; Rebecca Perrott	Women's 4 × 100 m freestyle relay	—N/a		DQ	6

== Weightlifting ==
Athlete	Event	Snatch	Clean and jerk	Total	Rank
Precious McKenzie	Bantamweight	97.5 kg	122.5 kg	220.0 kg	1st place, gold medalist(s)
George Newton	Featherweight	NVL	DNF		
Phillip Sue	Lightweight	115.0 kg	147.5 kg	262.5 kg	3rd place, bronze medalist(s)
Tony Ebert	Middleweight	NVL	DNF		
Brian Marsden	Middle heavyweight	137.5 kg	175.0 kg	312.5 kg	3rd place, bronze medalist(s)
Rory Barrett	Heavyweight	150.0 kg	182.5 kg	332.5 kg	4

== Wrestling ==
Athlete	Event	Elimination rounds				Final round	Rank
Athlete	Event	Opposition Result	Opposition Result	Opposition Result	Opposition Result	Opposition Result	Rank
Barry Oldridge	Bantamweight	Singh (IND); L 4–0	Dzeladini (AUS); W 0.5–3.5	Barry (CAN); L 4–0	Eliminated	Gill (ENG); L 4–0	4
Raymond Katting	Featherweight	Barry (AUS); W 0–4	Beiler (CAN); L 4–0	Singh (IND); L 4–0	Eliminated		4
Ken Reinsfield	Lightweight	Bye	Walker (JAM); L 4–0	Kumar (IND); L 4–0	Eliminated		5
Stephen Robinson	Welterweight	Singh (IND); L 3.5–0.5	Zilberman (CAN); L 4–0	Eliminated			5
Robert Hoffman	Middleweight	Koenig (AUS); L 4–0	Weir (NIR); L 4–0	Eliminated			6
Nigel Sargent	Light heavyweight	Danier (CAN); L 4–0	L	Eliminated			4
Murray Avery	Heavyweight	Bye	Wishart (CAN); L 3–1	Peache (ENG); W 0–4	Singh (IND); L 4–0	Eliminated	3rd place, bronze medalist(s)

== Officials ==
- Team manager – Jack Prestney
- Assistant team manager – Tay Wilson
- Women's manager – Marion Jackman
- Team doctor – Noel Roydhouse
- Physiotherapists – Peter Stokes, Mark Oram
- Attache – G. R. Thompson
- Athletics
  - Section manager – Barry Hunt
  - Coach (track) – Arch Jelley
  - Coach (field) – Les Mills
- Badminton section manager – Paul Skelt
- Bowls section manager – Gordon Jolly
- Boxing
  - Section manager – C. F. Scott
  - Trainer – Alan Scaife
- Cycling
  - Section manager – Gordon Sharrock
  - Coach (track) – Max Vertongen
  - Coach (road) – Wayne Thorpe
  - Mechanic – G. J. Brady
- Gymnastics
  - Section manager – P. Chan
  - Coach (men) – M. C. Charteris
  - Coach (women) – A. J. Holt
- Shooting
  - Section manager – A. A. Brown
  - Assistant section manager (full-bore) – Ben Hoban
  - Coach (rapid-fire pistol) – D. H. Stringer
  - Coach (free pistol) – J. A. Gordon
- Swimming and diving
  - Section manager – I. N. Chadwick
  - Chief coach – R. J. McIntyre
  - Coach (diving) – M. H. Campbell
- Weightlifting section manager – Bruce Cameron
- Wrestling
  - Section manager – K. J. Humphrey
  - Coach – C. L. Palmer

== See also ==
- New Zealand Olympic Committee
- New Zealand at the Commonwealth Games
- New Zealand at the 1976 Summer Olympics
- New Zealand at the 1980 Summer Olympics
