= Boxing at the 1978 Commonwealth Games =

- Venue: Edmonton Gardens
- Location: Edmonton, Canada
- Dates: 3 to 12 August 1978

Boxing at the 1978 Commonwealth Games was the 11th appearance of the Boxing at the Commonwealth Games. The events were held in Edmonton, Canada, from 3 to 12 August 1978 and featured contests in eleven weight classes.

The boxing events were held at Edmonton Gardens.

Kenya topped the boxing medal table by virtue of winning one more silver medal than Canada and Northern Ireland.

== Medal table ==
* Host nation (Canada)

Medals won by nation with totals, ranked by number of golds—sortable
Rank	Nation	Gold	Silver	Bronze	Total
1	Kenya	2	2	3	7
2	Canada*	2	1	5	8
3	Northern Ireland	2	1	1	4
4	England	1	2	1	4
5	Ghana	1	1	1	3
6	Australia	1	0	1	2
7	Guyana	1	0	0	1
7	Jamaica	1	0	0	1
9	Zambia	0	2	2	4
10	Scotland	0	1	1	2
11	Papua New Guinea	0	1	0	1
12	Samoa	0	0	3	3
13	India	0	0	1	1
13	New Zealand	0	0	1	1
13	Wales	0	0	1	1
Totals (15 entries)		11	11	21	43

== Medallists ==
Event	Gold	Silver	Bronze
Light Flyweight	(Kenya) Stephen Muchoki	(Zambia) Francis Kabala	(India) Birender Thapa (Ghana) Kid Jumalia
Flyweight	(Kenya) Michael Irungu	(Canada) Ian Clyde	(Australia) Peter Wighton (Northern Ireland) Hugh Russell
Bantamweight	(Northern Ireland) Barry McGuigan	(Papua New Guinea) Tumat Sogolik	(Kenya) Douglas Maina (Canada) William Rannelli
Featherweight	(Ghana) Azumah Nelson	(Zambia) John Sichula	(Canada) Guy Boutin (England) Moss O'Brien
Lightweight	(Northern Ireland) Gerry Hamill	(Kenya) Patrick Waweru	(Zambia) Teddy Makofi (Scotland) John McAllister
Light Welterweight	(Guyana) Winfield Braithwaite	(Scotland) Jim Douglas	(Canada) John Raftery (Kenya) Michael Mawangi
Welterweight	(Jamaica) Mike McCallum	(Northern Ireland) Ken Beattie	(Canada) Derrick Hoyt (Wales) Tony Feal
Light Middleweight	(Canada) Kelly Perlette	(Kenya) Abdurahman Athuman	(Samoa) Ropati Vipo Samu (Zambia) Enock Chama
Middleweight	(Australia) Philip McElwaine	(England) Delroy Parkes	(Canada) Roddy MacDonald (Samoa) Richard Betham
Light Heavyweight	(Canada) Roger Fortin	(England) Vince Smith	(Samoa) Fautala Su'a (Kenya) Edward Thande
Heavyweight	(England) Julius Awome	(Ghana) Joseph Adamah Mensah	(New Zealand) George Stankovich

== Results ==
=== Light-flyweight under 48kg ===
Round	Winner	Loser	Score
Quarter-Final	(Zambia) Francis Musankabala	(Jamaica) Richard Clarke	RSC 3
Quarter-Final	(Kenya) Stephen Muchoki	(England) Joe Dawson	RSC 1
Quarter-Final	(India) Birender Thapa	(Northern Ireland) Jim Carson	Pts
Semi-Final	(Zambia) Francis Musankabala	(Ghana) Kid Sumaila	RSC 2
Semi-Final	(Kenya) Stephen Muchoki	(India) Birender Thapa	Pts
Final	(Kenya) Stephen Muchoki	(Zambia) Francis Musankabala	5:0

=== Flyweight 51kg ===
Round	Winner	Loser	Score
Preliminary	(Canada) Ian Clyde	(Tanzania) Emmanuel Mlundwa	Pts
Preliminary	(Zambia) Lucky Mutale	(Samoa) Faoa Ofe	RSC 2
Preliminary	(Scotland) Joseph Park	(Papua New Guinea) Jack Eki	Pts
Preliminary	(Northern Ireland) Hugh Russell	(Wales) Russell Jones	Pts
Quarter-Final	(Kenya) Michael Irungu	(Ghana) Peter Mensah	RSC 2
Quarter-Final	(Australia) Peter Wighton	(England) Gary Nickels	Pts
Quarter-Final	(Canada) Ian Clyde	(Zambia) Lucky Mutale	Pts
Quarter-Final	(Northern Ireland) Hugh Russell	(Scotland) Joseph Park	KO 1
Semi-Final	(Kenya) Michael Irungu	(Australia) Peter Wighton	Pts
Semi-Final	(Canada) Ian Clyde	(Northern Ireland) Hugh Russell	KO 1
Final	(Kenya) Michael Irungu	(Canada) Ian Clyde	Pts

=== Bantamweight 54kg ===
Round	Winner	Loser	Score
Preliminary	(Kenya) Douglas Maina	(Bangladesh) Syed Mohiuddin	DQ 3
Preliminary	(Papua New Guinea) Tumat Sogolik	(England) Jackie Turner	Pts
Preliminary	(Wales) David George	(Australia) Wade Blaik	Pts
Preliminary	(Canada) Bill Rannelli	(Belize) Ashley Rivers	Pts
Preliminary	(Malawi) Kid Gondwe	(Samoa) Elisaia Nanai	Pts
Preliminary	(Guyana) Michael Anthony	(Ghana) Anthony Abacheng	Pts
Preliminary	(Northern Ireland) Barry McGuigan	(Scotland) George Lowe	DQ 2
Quarter-Final	(Canada) Bill Rannelli	(Malawi) Kid Gondwe	Pts
Quarter-Final	(Kenya) Douglas Maina	(Tanzania) Mabushi Isaack	RSC 2
Quarter-Final	(Papua New Guinea) Tumat Sogolik	(Wales) David George	KO 2
Quarter-Final	(Northern Ireland) Barry McGuigan	(Guyana) Michael Anthony	Pts
Semi-Final	(Papua New Guinea) Tumat Sogolik	(Kenya) Douglas Maina	KO 1
Semi-Final	(Northern Ireland) Barry McGuigan	(Canada) Bill Rannelli	RSC 3
Final	(Northern Ireland) Barry McGuigan	(Papua New Guinea) Tumat Sogolik	Pts

=== Featherweight 57kg ===
Round	Winner	Loser	Score
Preliminary	(Canada) Guy Boutin	(Northern Ireland) Kenny Webb	RSC 3
Preliminary	(Australia) Gary Williams	(Eswatini) Jonathan Magagula	Pts
Preliminary	(England) Moss O'Brien	(Canada) Richard Pittman	Pts
Preliminary	(Zambia) John Sichula	(Guyana) Ron Ferguson	Pts
Preliminary	(Scotland) Ian McLeod	(Malawi) Solomon Kondowe	Pts
Quarter-Final	(Ghana) Azumah Nelson	(Samoa) Siaosi Poto	RSC 2
Quarter-Final	(Canada) Guy Boutin	(Kenya) Modest Napunyi	Pts
Quarter-Final	(England) Moss O'Brien	(Australia) Gary Williams	Pts
Quarter-Final	(Zambia) John Sichula	(Scotland) Ian McLeod	Pts
Semi-Final	(Ghana) Azumah Nelson	(Canada) Guy Boutin	Pts
Semi-Final	(Zambia) John Sichula	(England) Moss O'Brien	RSC 3
Final	(Ghana) Azumah Nelson	(Zambia) John Sichula	Pts

=== Lightweight 60kg ===
Round	Winner	Loser	Score
Preliminary	(England) George Gilbody	(Guyana) Clifton Nichols	Pts
Preliminary	(Kenya) Patrick Waweru	(The Bahamas) Junior Bethel	DQ 3
Preliminary	(Australia) Brian Tink	(Malawi) Joe Nyirenda	KO 1
Preliminary	(Northern Ireland) Gerry Hamill	(India) Bakshish Singh	Pts
Preliminary	(Canada) Frank Nolan	(Eswatini) Robert Lukhele	AB 1
Preliminary	(Zambia) Teddy Makofi	(Bangladesh) Nurul Islam	RSC 1
Quarter-Final	(Scotland) Johnny McAllister	(Ghana) Akwei Addo	Pts
Quarter-Final	(Kenya) Patrick Waweru	(England) George Gilbody	RSCI 2
Quarter-Final	(Northern Ireland) Gerry Hamill	(Australia) Brian Tink	Pts
Quarter-Final	(Zambia) Teddy Makofi	(Canada) Frank Nolan	Pts
Semi-Final	(Kenya) Patrick Waweru	(Scotland) Johnny McAllister	Pts
Semi-Final	(Northern Ireland) Gerry Hamill	(Zambia) Teddy Makofi	Pts
Final	(Northern Ireland) Gerry Hamill	(Kenya) Patrick Waweru	Pts

=== Light-welterweight 63.5kg ===
Round	Winner	Loser	Score
Preliminary	(Sierra Leone) Baby Joe Swengbe	(The Bahamas) Alvin Sargeant	Pts
Preliminary	(Scotland) Jim Douglas	(Samoa) Toetu Malo	Pts
Preliminary	(Ghana) Baba Sumaila	(Belize) Rupert Flowers	RSC 1
Preliminary	(Guyana) Winfield Braithwaite	(Australia) Alec Leatherday	Pts
Preliminary	(Kenya) Michael Mwangi	(India) Chenanda Machaiah	Pts
Preliminary	(New Zealand) Gaulua Folasi	(Jamaica) Alston Cameron	Pts
Quarter-Final	(Canada) John Raftery	(Tanzania) Lucas Msomba	Pts
Quarter-Final	(Scotland) Jim Douglas	(Sierra Leone) Baby Joe Swengbe	Pts
Quarter-Final	(Guyana) Winfield Braithwaite	(Ghana) Baba Sumaila	Pts
Quarter-Final	(Kenya) Michael Mwangi	(New Zealand) Gaulua Folasi	KO 2
Semi-Final	(Guyana) Winfield Braithwaite	(Kenya) Michael Mwangi	Pts
Semi-Final	(Scotland) Jim Douglas	(Canada) John Raftery	RSCI 2
Final	(Guyana) Winfield Braithwaite	(Scotland) Jim Douglas	KO 1

=== Welterweight 67kg ===
Round	Winner	Loser	Score
Extra Preliminary	(Kenya) Philip Mathenge	(Cayman Islands) Nayon Anglin	KO 1
Preliminary	(Wales) Tony Feal	(New Zealand) David Jackson	KO 1
Preliminary	(Tanzania) Ahmed Tesha	(Australia) David Hall	Pts
Preliminary	(Northern Ireland) Ken Beattie	(The Bahamas) Sam Whymms	Pts
Preliminary	(Ghana) Moro Tahiru	(Samoa) Malo Samu	Pts
Preliminary	(England) Paul Kelly	(Zambia) Robert Kanongeki	RSC 1
Preliminary	(Jamaica) Mike McCallum	(Scotland) Steven Cooney	Pts
Preliminary	(Canada) Derrick Hoyt	(Sierra Leone) Benjamin Sesay	RSC 2
Preliminary	(Guyana) Brian Bovell	(Kenya) Philip Mathenge	Pts
Quarter-Final	(Wales) Tony Feal	(Tanzania) Ahmed Tesha	KO 1
Quarter-Final	(Northern Ireland) Ken Beattie	(Ghana) Moro Tahiru	Pts
Quarter-Final	(Jamaica) Mike McCallum	(England) Paul Kelly	Pts
Quarter-Final	(Canada) Derrick Hoyt	(Guyana) Brian Bovell	Pts
Semi-Final	(Jamaica) Mike McCallum	(Canada) Derrick Hoyt	Pts
Semi-Final	(Northern Ireland) Ken Beattie	(Wales) Tony Feal	Pts
Final	(Jamaica) Mike McCallum	(Northern Ireland) Ken Beattie	Pts

=== Light-middleweight 71kg ===
Round	Winner	Loser	Score
Preliminary	(Samoa) Ropati Vipo Samu	(Northern Ireland) Tony McAvoy	KO 3
Preliminary	(Ghana) Mohammed Coffie	(Australia) Wayne Devlin	RSC 2
Preliminary	(Kenya) Abdulahaman Athuman	(Malawi) Justice Tandani	Pts
Preliminary	(Scotland) Archie Salmon	(Guyana) Mortimer Noel	Pts
Preliminary	(Zambia) Enock Chama	(India) Kumar Rai	Pts
Quarter-Final	(Canada) Kelly Perlette	(Tanzania) Luigi Nuti	Pts
Quarter-Final	(Samoa) Ropati Vipo Samu	(New Zealand) Ronald Jackson	Pts
Quarter-Final	(Kenya) Abdulahaman Athuman	(Ghana) Mohammed Coffie	Pts
Quarter-Final	(Zambia) Enock Chama	(Scotland) Archie Salmon	Pts
Semi-Final	(Canada) Kelly Perlette	(Samoa) Ropati Vipo Samu	Pts
Semi-Final	(Kenya) Abdulahaman Athuman	(Zambia) Enock Chama	Pts
Final	(Canada) Kelly Perlette	(Kenya) Abdulahaman Athuman	Pts

=== Middleweight 75kg ===
Round	Winner	Loser	Score
Preliminary	(England) Delroy Parkes	(New Zealand) Perry Rackley	Pts
Quarter-Final	(Samoa) Richard Betham	(Guyana) Ansil Thomas	DQ 3
Quarter-Final	(Australia) Phil McElwaine	(Kenya) Stephen Moi	Pts
Quarter-Final	(Canada) Roddy MacDonald	(Ghana) Kpakpo Allotey	KO 1
Quarter-Final	(England) Delroy Parkes	(Cayman Islands) Dale Ramoon	RSC 2
Semi-Final	(Australia) Phil McElwaine	(Canada) Roddy MacDonald	DQ 3
Semi-Final	(England) Delroy Parkes	(Samoa) Faitala Su'a	KO 2
Final	(Australia) Phil McElwaine	(England) Delroy Parkes	Pts

=== Light-heavyweight 81kg ===
Round	Winner	Loser	Score
Quarter-Final	(Kenya) Edward Thande	(Australia) Benny Pike	RSC 3
Quarter-Final	(England) Vince Smith	(New Zealand) Dean Rackley	Pts
Semi-Final	(Canada) Roger Fortin	(Samoa) Faitala Su'a	KO 2
Semi-Final	(England) Vince Smith	(Kenya) Edward Thande	Pts
Final	(Canada) Roger Fortin	(England) Vince Smith	RSCI 1

=== Heavyweight +81kg ===
Round	Winner	Loser	Score
Quarter-Final	(England) Julius Awome		bye
Quarter-Final	(Guyana) Rodwell Paton		bye
Quarter-Final	(New Zealand) George Stankovich	(Kenya) Joseph Kabegi	Pts
Quarter-Final	(Guyana) Joseph Adamah Mensah	(Samoa) Vitolio Pupuali'i	RSC 3
Semi-Final	(England) Julius Awome	(Guyana) Rodwell Paton	w/o
Semi-Final	(England) Julius Awome+	(New Zealand) George Stankovich	Pts
Semi-Final	(Ghana) Joseph Adamah Mensah	no opponent	w/o
Final	(England) Julius Awome	(Ghana) Joseph Adamah Mensah	Pts

+ re-draw
