= David Wright (disambiguation) =

David Wright (born 1982) is an American baseball player.

David Wright may also refer to:

== Diplomats ==
- David Wright (British diplomat) (born 1944), U.K. ambassador to Japan
- David Wright (Canadian diplomat) (born 1944), Canadian diplomat

== Musicians ==
- David Wright (British musician) (born 1953), British keyboard player, composer and producer
- Hoss Wright, American drummer

== Politicians ==
- David McKenzie Wright (1874–1937), Canadian House of Commons member
- David R. Wright (1935–2016), American politician from Pennsylvania
- David Wright (British politician) (born 1966)
- David A. Wright, American businessman and politician from South Carolina
- Dave Wright (Tennessee politician) (born 1945), American politician

== Sports ==
- David Wright (swimming coach) (born 1948), New Zealand swimming coach
- David Wright (rugby league) (born 1951), Australian rugby league footballer
- David Wright (American soccer) (born 1978), soccer defender
- David Wright (English footballer) (born 1980)
- David Wright (sailor) (born 1981), Canadian sport sailor
- Dave Wright (baseball) (1875–1946), American baseball pitcher
- Dave Wright (Scottish footballer) (1905–1955)
- Dave Wright (runner) (born 1951), South African ultramarathon runner
- Dave Wright (badminton) (born 1965), English badminton player

== Writers ==
- David McKee Wright (1869–1928), Irish-born Australian poet and journalist
- David Wright (poet) (1920–1994), South African poet
- David Wright (writer), American writer and journalist
- David Wright (journalist) (born 1964), American broadcast journalist
- David Wright, television writer and 2-time Survivor contestant

== Others ==
- David McCord Wright (1909–1968), American economist and educator
- David Wright (academic), professor of health and social policy
- David Wright (artist) (1912–1967), British artist and illustrator
- David F. Wright (1937–2008), Canadian historian
- David P. Wright (born 1953), American theologian
- David Wright (arranger) (born 1949), mathematics professor and barbershop arranger
- David C. Wright, American businessman, former owner of Sterling Faucet
