= Gymnastics at the 1978 Commonwealth Games =

- Venue: Northlands Coliseum
- Location: Edmonton, Canada
- Dates: 3 to 12 August 1978

Gymnastics at the 1978 Commonwealth Games was the debut appearance of the Gymnastics at the Commonwealth Games. The events were held in Edmonton, Canada, from 3 to 12 August 1978 and featured four events.

The gymnastics events were held at Northlands Coliseum.

Canada topped the gymnastics medal table by virtue of winning gold in all four events.

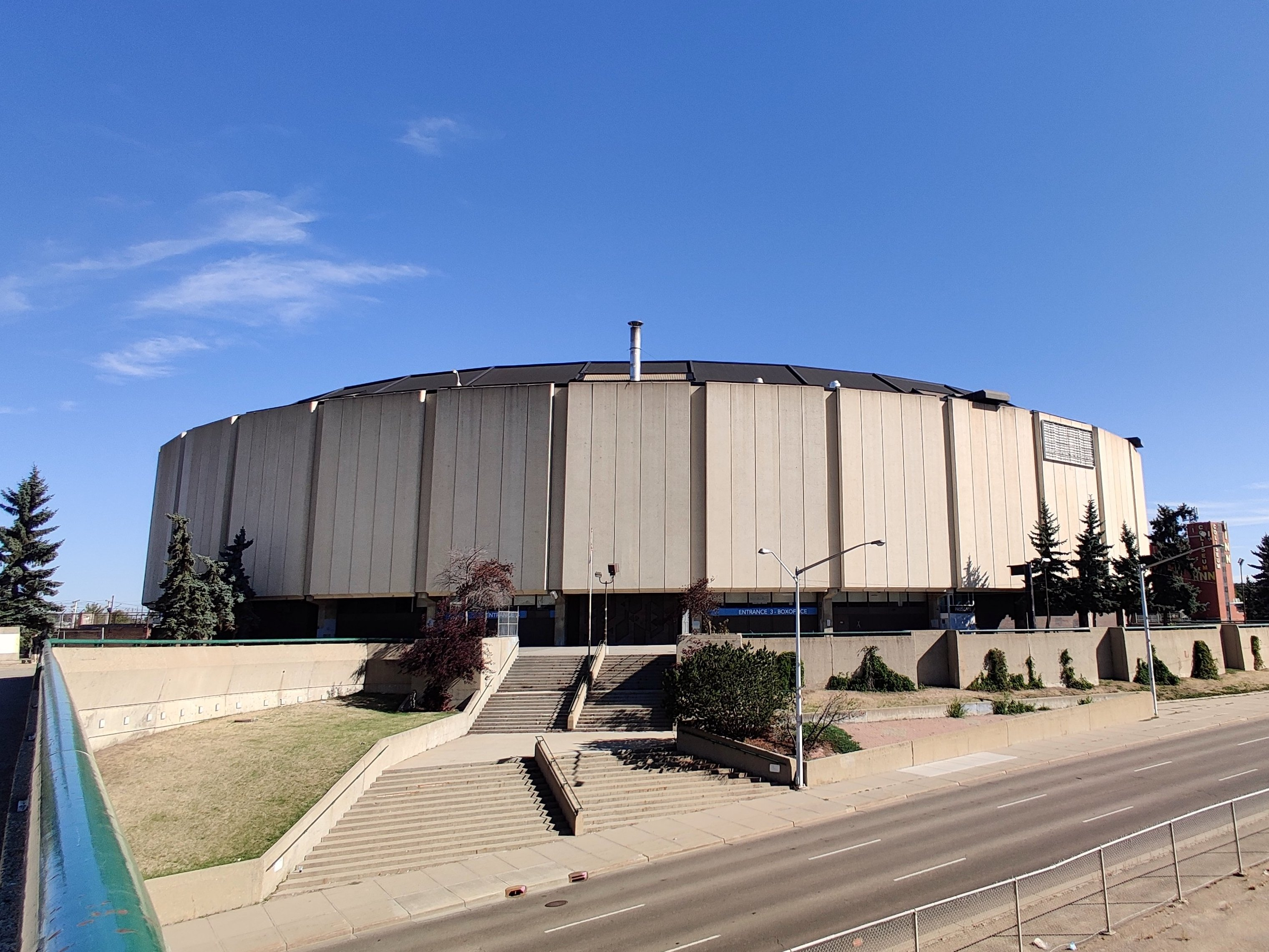
Northlands Coliseum

== Medal table ==
* Host nation (Canada)

Medals won by nation with totals, ranked by number of golds—sortable
Rank	Nation	Gold	Silver	Bronze	Total
1	Canada*	4	2	1	7
2	England	0	2	0	2
3	Australia	0	1	1	2
4	New Zealand	0	0	1	1
Totals (4 entries)		4	5	3	12

== Medallists ==
Event	Gold	Silver	Bronze
Men's all-around	Philip Delesalle; Canada	Lindsay Nylund; Australia	Jean Choquette; Canada
Men's team	(Canada); Jean Choquette; Nigel Rothwell; Owen Walstrom; Philip Delesalle	(England); Eddie Arnold; Ian Neale; Jeff Davis; Tommy Wilson	(Australia); Lambert Ariens; Lindsay Nylund; Rudolf Starosta; Warwick Forbes
Women's all-around	Elfi Schlegel; Canada	Monica Goermann; Canada Sherry Hawco; Canada	—N/a
Women's team	(Canada); Elfi Schlegel; Karen Kelsall; Monica Goermann; Sherry Hawco	(England); Joanna Sime; Karen Robb; Lisa Jackman; Susan Cheesebrough	(New Zealand); Deborah Hurst; Kirsty Durward; Lynette Brake; Rowena Davis

== Results ==
=== Men's individual all-around ===
Pos	Athlete	Points
1	(Canada) Philip Delesalle	56.40
2	(Australia) Lindsay Nylund	54.95
3	(Canada) Jean Choquette	54.25
4	(Canada) Owen Carl Walstrom	53.90
5	(England) Tommy Wilson	53.70
6	(New Zealand) Terry Sale	53.45
7	(Canada) Nigel Rothwell	53.25
8	(England) Ian Neale	53.20
9	(England) Eddie Arnold	52.90
10	(Australia) Warwick Forbes	52.45
11	(England) Jeff Davis	51.85
12	(Australia) Lambert Ariens	51.60
13	(New Zealand) Neil Christopher Davies	51.15
14	(New Zealand) Gregory McBey Robertson	49.45
15	(Australia) Rudolf Starosta	48.40
16	(New Zealand) Hugh Richard Wilkins	47.70
17	(Wales) Paul Preedy	46.70
18	(Wales) Michael Joseph Higgins	42.90
19	(India) Bishwe Shwar Nandi	42.85
20	(India) Nemai Kanji	40.05

=== Men's team ===
Pos	Athlete	Pts
1	Canada	165.55
2	England	161.95
3	Australia	158.50
4	New Zealand	154.00
5	Wales	138.15
6	India	127.70
7	Bangladesh	27.80
8	Cyprus	18.25

=== Women's individual all-around ===
Pos	Athlete	Pts
1	(Canada) Elfi Schlegel	38.250
2	(Canada) Sherry Hawco	37.650
2	(Canada) Monica Goermann	37.650
4	(Canada) Karen Kelsall	37.550
5	(Australia) Marina Sulicich	36.000
5	(England) Susan Cheesebrough	36.000
5	(England) Karen Robb	36.000
8	(New Zealand) Deborah Hurst	35.950
9	(New Zealand) Rowena Davis	35.900
10	(New Zealand) Kirsty Durward	35.600
11	(England) Joanna Sime	35.350
12	(Australia) Karen Susan Edelsten	34.350
13	(Scotland) Karen Forbes	33.850
14	(Australia) Margaret Jack	33.800
15	(Wales) Linda Bernard	33.800
16	(Wales) Linda Surringer	33.550
17	(New Zealand) Lynette Brake	32.950
18	(Wales) Jacqueline Vokes	32.950
19	(Scotland) Catriona Macaulay	32.850
20	(Scotland) Eileen Ramsay	32.700

=== Women's team ===
Pos	Athlete	Pts
1	Canada	113.250
2	England	107.400
3	New Zealand	106.350
4	Australia	103.450
5	Wales	101.200
6	Scotland	100.550
7	Hong Kong	79.000
8	Cyprus	28.300
