= Merv Richards =

New Zealand pole vaulter (1930–2018)

Personal information
- Born: 16 November 1930 Oamaru, New Zealand
- Died: 1 July 2018 (aged 87)
- Spouse: Winnie Garrod (m. 1958)
- Relative: Deborah Hurst (daughter)

Sport
- Country: New Zealand
- Sport: Track and field
- Event: Pole vault

Achievements and titles
- National finals: Pole vault champion (1952–1962)
Medal record
Representing New Zealand
British Empire and Commonwealth Games
| Bronze medal – third place | 1958 Cardiff | Pole vault |

Mervyn David Richards (16 November 1930 – 1 July 2018) was a New Zealand pole vaulter, who represented his country at three British Empire and Commonwealth Games, winning a bronze medal in 1958. He went on to become a successful coach in both pole vault and gymnastics.

== Early life and family ==
Born in Oamaru on 16 November 1930, Richards was the youngest child of David Llewellyn Richards and Hephzibah Richards (née Mears). After leaving Oamaru, the family lived briefly in Waitati, before moving to Dunedin where Richards was educated at King Edward Technical College. When he was 16 years old, he began training as an optical technician, and worked in that occupation until he retired.

In 1958, Richards married Margaret Winifred Garrod—who won the national women's javelin title in 1957 and 1958—at Mosgiel Anglican church. The couple went on to have three children, including Deborah Hurst who won a bronze medal in gymnastics at the 1978 Commonwealth Games.

== Pole vault ==
=== Competitor ===
Richards won the New Zealand national pole vault title 11 years in succession, from 1952 to 1962. He also represented New Zealand in the pole vault at three consecutive British Empire and Commonwealth Games from 1950 to 1958. At the 1950 Empire Games in Auckland, he finished eighth with a height of 12 ft 3 in (3.73 m). Four years later, at the British Empire and Commonwealth Games in Vancouver, he cleared 13 ft 0 in (3.96 m) to finish in fifth place. Finally, at the 1958 games in Cardiff, he won the bronze medal after a countback, with a vault of 13 ft 8 in (4.17 m).

Richards won the British AAA Championships title at the 1958 AAA Championships.

=== Coach ===
Richards was a successful pole vault coach in Dunedin, training a number of national champions, including 1962 British Empire and Commonwealth Games representative Kevin Gibbons. He also provided technical advice to Melina Hamilton while she was a student at the University of Otago in the late 1990s.

== Gymnastics coach ==
Richards became a gymnastics coach at the Athlon club in Dunedin, and trained Rowena Davis and his daughter Deborah, who were a part of the New Zealand women's team that won the bronze medal in the all-around competition at the 1978 Commonwealth Games. He was subsequently appointed head coach of the New Zealand gymnastics team for the 1980 Summer Olympics, but the team did not complete because of the boycott that year.

== Later life and death ==
Richards became an enthusiastic lapidarist, and won the New Zealand Lapidary Cup in 1986 and 2011. He died on 1 July 2018.
