= Andy Stankovich =

New Zealand boxer

- Born: Andrew Stankovich; New Zealand
- Occupations: Entertainer, singer, metal recycling company principal
- Years active: c. 2000 to present

Andy Stankovich is an Elvis tribute artist from New Zealand who has been performing since the early 1990s. He is also a former boxer who along with his brother won a gold medal at the Oceania Games in Australia. He has fought in Australia and the United States. His Elvis act has taken him to countries that include Australia, Hawaii, Fiji and the United States, where he has performed in Nashville. He has also been credited with inspiring Samoan musician Alphonso Keil to become an Elvis impersonator. In his day job, he runs a scrap metal business. He has also recently been the subject of a documentary.

== Background ==
Stankovich is of Tarara descent which is a term given to people who are of Maori and Croatian descent. In 1920, his grandfather came to Auckland from Vrgorac, Croatia. He headed north to Ahipara to find work in the gum fields. There, he met Hiria Pene, a full blooded Maori woman who was to become Stankovich's grandmother. Stankovich's mother is half Maori and half Croatian. Being connected to the culture, his family in 2009 were attending the third Tarara Day, which was being held at a Winery Estate in the Auckland suburb of Massey. His sister was also organizing a committee for the event.

He is the subject of Ursula Williams's documentary, The King, which portrays him in his roles as a scrap metal yard worker in the day and an Elvis performer at night. It was chosen to screen at the Sydney Film Festival. The film was one of six films selected by Lee Tamahori as a finalist for the New Zealand International Film Festival’s annual New Zealand’s Best Short Film Competition.

== Music career ==
The New Zealand Herald has referred to him as Auckland's best loved Elvis impersonator. One day he was seen by Alphonso Keil who was a seasoned musician. Keil, who had been a member of the Keil Isles and the Sundowners, started his Elvis acts after seeing Stankovich perform. As well as his home country New Zealand, he has performed in the United States, Australia. In the Pacific Islands, he has performed in Hawaii and Fiji. Stankovich differs from some of the other Elvis performers in that no longer uses the Elvis-style jump suits.

In February 2012, along Australia's Paul Fenech, and New Zealanders, Che Orton, Steve Fitter, Kerryn Winn, Brendon Chase and Melissa Perkins, he was to appear at the Auckland Botanic Gardens in Manurewa in a tribute concert to Elvis. In July that year he was in Memphis, Tennessee for a video shoot. The backing group was Ray Walker & the Jordanaires. It was to be shot at the Texas Troubadour Theatre, on Nashville's Music Valley Drive. His Nashville show was set up by New Zealand promoter Gray Bartlett.

In July 2015, Stankovich was embarking on the Elvis: One Night With You tour, which consisted of six shows across New Zealand. On 11 July he was booked to perform in Whangārei, which is north of Auckland as part of his tour.

== Boxing ==
His amateur boxing career lasted 12 years and he had 342 amateur fights. In the late 1970s, he won a bronze medal at the World Cup Boxing Championships that were held in New York. In 1979, along with his brother George and Fred Tafua, he won a gold medal at the Oceania Games in Australia. His brother defeated Tomasi Watemoaheke from New Caledonia, and he defeated Phil McElwaine from NSW on points.
