= Kevin Blackwell (disambiguation) =

Kevin Blackwell (born 1958) is an English football goalkeeper, coach and manager.

Kevin Blackwell may also refer to:

- Kevin Blackwell (politician) (born 1954), American politician from Mississippi
- Kevin Blackwell (cyclist) (c. 1956–1980), New Zealand cyclist
