= Kevin Blackwell (cyclist) =

New Zealand cyclist

Personal information
- Born: Kevin Edward Blackwell; 1955 or 1956
- Died: 16 August 1980 (aged 24)

Sport
- Country: New Zealand
- Sport: Track cycling
Medal record
Men's track cycling
Representing New Zealand
Commonwealth Games
Silver medal – second place	1978 Edmonton	Team pursuit

Kevin Edward Blackwell (1955 or 1956 – 16 August 1980) was a New Zealand road and track cyclist who won a silver medal in the team pursuit representing his country at the 1978 Commonwealth Games.

== Biography ==
Blackwell was born in about 1956, the son of Alison and Claude Blackwell, and educated at Rotorua Boys' High School.

In 1976, Blackwell competed in road cycling tours in Europe. He participated in the Ster Van Henegouwen (Etoile Hennuyere) in Belgium, with a best stage result of seventh place on stage 6. He was 52nd on general classification in the Tour of Britain (Milk Race), and 42nd on general classification in the Tour of Scotland.

Blackwell represented New Zealand in the men's team pursuit—alongside Anthony Cuff, Neil Lyster and Jack Swart—at the 1978 Commonwealth Games in Edmonton, winning the silver medal. The New Zealand combination had the second-fastest time in qualification and beat England in the semi-final, before losing to Australia in the final.

Blackwell was selected in the New Zealand cycling team for the 1980 Summer Olympics in Moscow, but did not compete because of the partial boycott by New Zealand. Blackwell died on 16 August 1980, and he was buried at Kauae Cemetery in Ngongotahā.

== Legacy ==
In Blackwell's memory, his family donated the Kevin Blackwell Memorial Cup to Cycling New Zealand. The trophy is contested annually at the New Zealand national hard track cycling championships, and is awarded to the winner of the under-17 boys' 500 metres time trial. Blackwell has been inducted into the Rotorua Boys' High School hall of fame.
