= George Stankovich =

New Zealand boxer

Personal information
- Full name: George Ian Stankovich
- Relatives: Andy Stankovich (brother)

Sport
- Sport: Boxing
- Weight class: Heavyweight
Medal record
Representing New Zealand
Men's boxing
Commonwealth Games
Bronze medal – third place	1978 Edmonton	Heavyweight

George Ian Stankovich is a former New Zealand boxer.

Stankovich won a bronze medal for his country in the heavyweight division at the 1978 Commonwealth Games in Edmonton, Canada. He won his first bout against the Kenyan boxer Joseph Kabegi, but then lost in the semifinal against the eventual gold medallist, Julius Awome from England.
