= Paul Bannon (runner) =

Canadian long-distance runner

Personal information
- Nationality: Canadian
- Born: 22 March 1954 (age 72) Scotland

Sport
- Sport: Long-distance running
- Event: Marathon
Medal record
Representing Canada
Men's Athletics
Commonwealth Games
Bronze medal – third place	1978 Edmonton	Marathon
- Updated on 22 October 2018

Paul Bannon (born 22 March 1954) is a Canadian long-distance runner. He won bronze medal in the marathon at the 1978 Commonwealth Games.

Bannon grew up in Scotland and was a promising junior athlete. In 1973 he accepted an athletics scholarship at Memphis State University. All through 1974–1977, he ran long distances races for the school team under his coach – Glenn Hays- where he set numerous records for the team. In 1991 he was honored in Memphis Tigers hall of fame, the same team he served in diligently from 1974 -m 1977.

Bannon moved to Toronto, Ontario, Canada in 1976 and became a member of the Toronto Olympic Club. In May 1978 he finished second in the Ottawa Marathon in a time of 2:16:03.2 and within a stride of Brian Maxwell. This was quickly followed by breaking the Canadian record for 20 km, finishing in a time of 1:01:06 in Chicago.

Bannon was selected for the 1978 Commonwealth Games marathon in Edmonton, Canada. He won a bronze medal behind winner Gidamis Shahanga and fellow Canadian Jerome Drayton. Five years later he went on to win the Vancouver Marathon which was long due to misdirection.

== Achievements ==
Year	Competition	Venue	Position	Event	Notes
Representing Canada
1978	Ottawa Marathon	Ottawa, Ontario, Canada	2nd	Marathon	2:16:03.2 (PB)
1978	Chicago 20 km	Chicago, United States	2nd	20 km	1:01:06 (Canadian Record)
1978	Commonwealth Games	Edmonton, Canada	3rd	Marathon	2:16:51.6
1983	Vancouver Marathon	Vancouver, British Columbia, Canada	1st	Marathon (long)	2:19:42
