= Athletics at the 1978 Commonwealth Games – Men's marathon =

Men's marathon at the Commonwealth Games

The men's marathon event at the 1978 Commonwealth Games was held on 11 August 1978 in Edmonton, Alberta, Canada.

== Results ==
Rank	Name	Nationality	Time	Notes
1st place, gold medalist(s)	Gidamis Shahanga	Tanzania	2:15:39.76	
2nd place, silver medalist(s)	Jerome Drayton	Canada	2:16:13.46	
3rd place, bronze medalist(s)	Paul Bannon	Canada	2:16:51.61	
4	Kevin Ryan	New Zealand	2:17:16	
5	Greg Hannon	Northern Ireland	2:17:25	
6	Paul Ballinger	New Zealand	2:17:46	
7	Richard Mabuza	Swaziland	2:19:49	
8	Michael Critchley	Wales	2:19:51	
9	Trevor Wright	England	2:20:15	
10	Stanley Curran	England	2:21:18	
11	Brian Maxwell	Canada	2:21:47	
12	Jeff Norman	England	2:22:23	
13	Terry Manners	New Zealand	2:23:00	
14	Emmanuel Ndiemandoi	Tanzania	2:24:55	
15	David Chettle	Australia	2:25:15	
16	Steve Kelly	Isle of Man	2:27:36	
17	James Butterfield	Bermuda	2:30:17	
18	James Dingwall	Scotland	2:32:54	
19	David Newton	Isle of Man	2:33:06	
20	Thomas Ruto	Kenya	2:36:44	
21	Garry Wilkinson	Bermuda	2:37:31	
22	Patrick Chiwala	Zambia	2:38:00	
23	Hector Romero	Gibraltar	2:42:25	
24	Raymond Swan	Bermuda	2:42:35	
25	Michael Rowland	Wales	2:48:10	
26	Kenneth Hlasa	Lesotho	2:52:35	
27	Frances Moholomanyane	Lesotho	2:52:58	
28	Baba Ibrahim Suma-Keita	Sierra Leone	2:56:08	
29	Bernard James	Saint Vincent and the Grenadines	3:03:05	
30	Henry Baptiste	Saint Lucia	3:11:09	
	Shivnath Singh	India	DNF	
	Richard Juma	Kenya	DNF	
	John Kirimiti	Kenya	DNF	
	John McLaughlin	Northern Ireland	DNF	
