= Michael Dunlop (disambiguation) =

Michael Dunlop (born 1989) is a Northern Irish motorcycle racer.

Michael Dunlop may also refer to:

- Michael Dunlop (footballer, born 1982), Scottish football defender
- Michael Dunlop (bowls), Northern Irish lawn bowler
