= Moss O'Brien =

Retired boxer who represented England

Personal information
- Nationality: (Republic of Ireland) Irish and (England) English
- Born: Cork, Ireland

Sport
- Sport: Boxing
Medal record
Boxing
Representing England
Commonwealth Games
Bronze medal – third place	1978 Edmonton	57kg featherweight

Maurice 'Moss' O'Brien (born in Ireland) is a retired boxer who represented England.

== Boxing career ==
O'Brien was the National Champion in 1978 after winning the prestigious ABA featherweight title, the title success was controversial because his opponent Austin Owens was considered by many to have done enough to have won the fight.

He represented England and won a bronze medal in the -57 kg featherweight division, at the 1978 Commonwealth Games in Edmonton, Alberta, Canada and boxed out of West Ham and later Repton (Bethnal Green) ABC.
