= John Sichula =

Zambian boxer (1955–1994)

Personal information
- Nickname: Big Joe
- Nationality: Zambian
- Born: John Sichula; 4 February 1955 Mufulira, Zambia
- Died: 1 October 1994 (aged 39)
- Weight: feather/super feather/light/light welterweight

Boxing career

Boxing record
- Total fights: 30
- Wins: 26 (KO 21)
- Losses: 3 (KO 0)
- Draws: 1

John "Big Joe" Sichula (4 February 1955 — 1 October 1994 (aged 39)), was a Zambian amateur featherweight and professional super feather/light/light welterweight boxer of the 1970s and '80s who as an amateur qualified for (but withdrew from) the Boxing at the 1976 Summer Olympics in Montreal, Quebec, Canada, won a bronze medal at featherweight at the 1978 All-Africa Games, won the silver medal at featherweight in the Boxing at the 1978 Commonwealth Games in Edmonton, Alberta, Canada losing the final against Azumah Nelson of Ghana, and as a professional won the African Boxing Union (ABU) lightweight title, ABU super featherweight title, and Commonwealth Super featherweight title (3-occasions), and was a challenger for the All African Super Featherweight Title against Sam Akromah, his professional fighting weight varied from 127 3/4 lb (57.9 kg; 9 st 1.8 lb), i.e. super featherweight to 135 1/2 lb (61.5 kg; 9 st 9.5 lb), i.e. light welterweight.
