= Lance Revill =

New Zealand boxer

- Born: Lance Revill; 30 August 1953 (age 73)
- Nationality: New Zealander
- Height: 183 cm (6 ft 0 in)
- Weight: 189.5 lb (86 kg; 13 st 8 lb)
- Division: Middleweight; Super Middleweight; Light Heavyweight; Cruiserweight; Heavyweight
- Years active: 1974 - 1976, 1978 - 1982, 1986 - 1990

Professional boxing record
- Total: 34
- Wins: 21
- By knockout: 13
- Losses: 13
- By knockout: 7
- Draws: 0

Other information
- Boxing record from BoxRec
- Last updated on: 20 February 2017

Lance Revill (born 30 August 1953) is the former president of the New Zealand Professional Boxing Association (NZPBA), a New Zealand boxing promoter, referee, and a former New Zealand professional boxer. Revill compiled a professional record of 21 wins and 13 losses, with 13 knockouts, in light heavyweight bouts fought in New Zealand and Australia between 1974 and 1990.

== Amateur and professional highlights ==
Revill represented New Zealand as an amateur boxer at the Commonwealth Games and won the bronze medal in the men's light middleweight division. Revill won the New Zealand light heavyweight boxing title in 1979 and the New Zealand heavyweight boxing title in 1988, and was 2–4 overall in national title bouts. Revill is best remembered for two professional bouts in 1989. The first, in a bout Revill was ruled to have lost in the second round, took place in Auckland, New Zealand, on 27 February 1989, as Revill, fighting at a career high 198 pounds, injured an arm when the ring collapsed. The other, Revill's best performance, took place on 24 May 1989, in New South Wales, Australia. In Revill's only ring appearance outside of New Zealand, Revill lost a 12-round split decision to Apollo Sweet in a bout for the vacant Commonwealth (British Empire), Australasian title and OPBF cruiserweight titles.

== Controversy ==
As president, Revill stated opinions frankly and publicly, bringing attention to the association.

In 2009, Revill was seen having an intense argument with the president of the rival New Zealand National Boxing Federation, Gary McCrystal, after an event that the Federation had commissioned in Revill's ring. Both presidents called each other an embarrassment to the sport.

Some comments focused on New Zealand heavyweight Joseph Parker. Revill's comments made news when Parker turned professional. He also said that Parker's promoters were only being interested in money, that Parker was being too hyped up and that Parker's December 2016 world title fight against Andy Ruiz was unjustified. In February 2017, backlash from these comments saw Revill resign as president of the NZPBA. Vice president John Conway was named interim president.

== Personal life ==
Revill was born in Auckland, where he resides with his wife Denise. They have four children: Lance Jacob (Jake) Revill, Lisa Ann Hohneck, Tanya Colleen Revill and Kylie Denise Bell. Kylie is listed as an official of the NZPBA on its website.

== Boxing titles ==
=== Amateur ===
- Gold Medal 1972 New Zealand Amateur National Championship (71kg)
- Gold Medal 1973 New Zealand Amateur National Championship (71kg)
- Gold Medal 1973 Oceania games in Nouméa (69kg)
- Bronze Medal 1974 Christchurch Commonwealth Games Men's Boxing (71kg)

=== Professional ===
- New Zealand Boxing Association light heavyweight title (174½Ibs)
- New Zealand Boxing Association heavyweight title (193½Ibs)
- South Pacific Cruiserweight Title

== Professional boxing record ==
34 fights	21 wins	13 losses
By knockout	13	7
By decision	8	6
Draws	0	

No.	Result	Record	Opponent	Type	Round, time	Date	Location	Notes
34	Lose	21–13	(Tonga) Young Haumona	TKO	6 (12)	10 Dec 1990	Auckland, New Zealand	New Zealand Boxing Association heavyweight title
33	Win	21–12	(New Zealand) Sione Revu	TKO	2 (10)	2 May 1990	Mandalay Ballroom, Auckland, New Zealand	
32	Lose	20–12	(Samoa) Apollo Sweet	SD	12	24 May 1989	Rosehill Racecourse, Sydney, New South Wales, Australia	vacant Commonwealth (British Empire), WBC - OPBF & Australasian Cruiserweight Titles
31	Lose	20–11	(Germany) Rudy Darno	TKO	2 (10)	27 Feb 1989	Highgate Hotel, Auckland, New Zealand	
30	Win	20–10	(Fiji) David Ravu Ravu	KO	3 (12)	9 May 1988	Auckland, New Zealand	South Pacific Cruiserweight Title
29	Win	19–10	(New Zealand) August Tanuvasa	MD	12	10 Feb 1988	Logan Campbell Centre, Auckland, New Zealand	New Zealand Boxing Association heavyweight title
28	Lose	18–10	(New Zealand) August Tanuvasa	TKO	7 (17)	28 Sep 1987	Auckland, New Zealand	New Zealand Boxing Association heavyweight title
27	Win	18–9	(Republic of Ireland) Kevin Barry	PTS	8	30 Mar 1987	Hyatt Kingsgate Centre, Auckland, New Zealand	
26	Win	17–9	(New Zealand) Luka Sugar Joel	KO	5 (10)	8 Dec 1986	Auckland, New Zealand	
25	Lose	16–9	(Samoa) Alex Sua	KO	4 (12)	10 Mar 1982	Carlaw Park Stadium, Auckland, New Zealand	vacant New Zealand Boxing Association light heavyweight title
24	Win	16–8	(New Zealand) Rocky Salanoa	PTS	10	16 Sep 1981	Weymouth Civic Centre, Auckland, New Zealand	
23	Lose	15–8	(Samoa) Monty Betham	PTS	12	5 Aug 1981	Trillo's Nightclub, Auckland, New Zealand	New Zealand Boxing Association light heavyweight title
22	Win	15–7	(Australia) Sam N'Gata	TKO	9 (10)	27 May 1981	Auckland, New Zealand	
21	Lose	14–7	(Samoa) Alex Sua	PTS	10	31 Mar 1981	Auckland, New Zealand	
20	Win	14–6	(New Zealand) Atelea Kaihea	TKO	5 (10)	8 Oct 1980	Auckland, New Zealand	
19	Win	13–6	(Fiji) Joe Fabiano	TKO	2 (10)	4 Sep 1980	Auckland, New Zealand	
18	Lose	12–6	(Samoa) Monty Betham	TKO	11 (12)	13 Apr 1980	Trillo's Nightclub, Auckland, New Zealand	New Zealand Boxing Association light heavyweight title
17	Win	12–5	(New Zealand) Rocky Salanoa	PTS	12	8 Mar 1980	Invercargill, New Zealand	
16	Win	11–5	(Australia) Terry Fox	KO	3 (10)	28 Oct 1979	Town Hall, Dunedin, New Zealand	
15	Win	10–5	(New Zealand) Peter Clay	KO	3 (10)	17 Sep 1979	Town Hall, Dunedin, New Zealand	
14	Win	9–5	(Samoa) Alex Sua	PTS	12	11 Jun 1979	Town Hall, Dunedin, New Zealand	vacant New Zealand Boxing Association light heavyweight title
13	Lose	8–5	(New Zealand) Eric Briggs	SD	10	6 Aug 1978	Caledonian Hall, Belfast, Christchurch, New Zealand	
12	Win	8–4	(New Zealand) Rocky Salanoa	SD	10	25 Jul 1978	Ponsonby Rugby Club, Auckland, New Zealand	
11	Win	7–4	(New Zealand) Tanuli Mose	TKO	4 (10)	27 Jun 1978	Ponsonby Rugby Club, Auckland, New Zealand	
10	Lose	6–4	(New Zealand) Rocky Salanoa	PTS	6	15 Jul 1976	YMCA Stadium, Auckland, New Zealand	
9	Win	6–3	(New Zealand) Rocky Salanoa	PTS	8	31 Jan 1976	Town Hall, Tauranga, New Zealand	
8	Lose	5–3	(Australia) Peter Clay	TKO	6 (8); 0:13	17 Mar 1975	YMCA Stadium, Auckland, New Zealand	
7	Lose	5–2	(New Zealand) Willie White	PTS	8	16 Dec 1974	Carlaw Park, Auckland, New Zealand	
6	Win	5–1	(Samoa) Ten Betham	TKO	2 (8)	19 Sep 1974	YMCA Stadium, Auckland, New Zealand	
5	Lose	4–1	(Fiji) Semi Bula	TKO	7 (10)	1 Aug 1974	Town Hall, Wellington, New Zealand	
4	Win	4–0	(New Zealand) Sammy Tongotongo	TKO	4 (8)	27 Jun 1974	Cameo Theatre, Auckland, New Zealand	
3	Win	3–0	(Australia) Jimmy Bavin	PTS	8	29 May 1974	Town Hall, Wellington, New Zealand	
2	Win	2–0	(New Zealand) Steve Falefage	TKO	3 (6)	16 Apr 1974	Town Hall, Auckland, New Zealand	
1	Win	1–0	(Australia) Billy Johnstone	TKO	2 (8)	4 Apr 1974	Town Hall, Wellington, New Zealand	Professional debut
