= Monty Betham (boxer) =

Samoan boxer (born 1952)

Personal information
- Nationality: New Zealander
- Born: Montgomery Richard Betham; 27 September 1952 (age 73) Tuasivi, Savaii, Western Samoa
- Height: 5 ft 10.5 in (179.1 cm)
- Weight: Middleweight
- Relatives: Monty Betham (son)

Boxing career
- Stance: Orthodox

Boxing record
- Wins: 43
- Win by KO: 23
- Losses: 10
- Draws: 0

Monty Betham (born 27 September 1952 in Savai'i) was a Samoan professional boxer who fought boxers such as Tony Mundine, and Lance Revill in a professional career beginning in 1973 until 1984. He is the father of former New Zealand Warriors rugby league star Monty Betham. He is also the older brother of Richard Betham, who won a bronze medal for Western Samoa in boxing at the 1978 Commonwealth Games.

In July 1975 he won the Commonwealth middleweight boxing title, after defeating Carlos Marks. he retained the title in February 1976 after defeating Semi Bula. He lost the title to Al Korovou in March 1978.
