= New Zealand Coaches Hall of Fame =

The New Zealand Coaches Hall of Fame is sponsored by Athletics New Zealand and the Athletics Coaches Association of New Zealand. Founded in 2006, the purpose of the Hall of Fame is to "increase the recognition and status of coaches." It is the first coaching Hall of Fame established in Australasia.

The coaches inducted into the Hall of Fame are:

- Jim Bellwood
- Arthur Eustace
- Arch Jelley
- Arthur Lydiard
