= Garry Bell =

New Zealand cyclist

Personal information
- Born: Garry David Bell; 4 January 1952 (age 74) Hamilton, New Zealand
- Height: 1.72 m (5 ft 8 in)
- Weight: 59 kg (130 lb)
Medal record
Men's cycling
Representing New Zealand
Commonwealth Games
| Bronze medal – third place | 1978 Edmonton | Road Race |

Garry David Bell (born 4 January 1952) is a former New Zealand cyclist, cycling administrator and coach.

== Early life and family ==
Bell was born in Hamilton on 4 January 1952, the son of Jean Lois and George Lewis Bell, and was educated at Hamilton Boys' High School. In 1978, he married Jennifer Mary Hirst, and the couple went on to have two children.

== Cycling career ==
Bell represented New Zealand internationally in road cycling from 1973 to 1980. At the 1974 British Commonwealth Games in Christchurch, he finished fifth in the men's road race. At the 1976 Summer Olympics in Montreal, he was 15th in the men's road race, and at the 1978 Commonwealth Games in Edmonton, he won the bronze medal in the men's road race. Bell also raced for New Zealand at the World Cycling Championships between 1975 and 1979.

Beginning in 1982, Bell was active as a cycling selector and coach. He coached the New Zealand cycling team at the 1990 Commonwealth Games, the 1990 World Championships, the 1992 Summer Olympics, the 1994 Commonwealth Games, and 2000 Summer Olympics.

In 1990, Bell was awarded the New Zealand 1990 Commemoration Medal.
