= Susan Cheesebrough =

British gymnast (born 1959)

Personal information
- Nationality: British
- Born: 9 September 1959 (age 67) Leicester, England

Sport
- Sport: Gymnastics
Medal record
Gymnastics
Representing England
Commonwealth Games
Silver medal – second place	1978 Edmonton	team

Susan Cheesebrough (born 9 September 1959) is a British gymnast. She competed at the 1976 Summer Olympics and the 1980 Summer Olympics. Her father, Albert, was a professional footballer.
