= Albert Jelley =

New Zealand cricket umpire

Personal information
- Full name: Albert Edward Jelley
- Born: 5 March 1894; Dunedin, New Zealand
- Died: 16 May 1966 (aged 72); Dunedin, New Zealand
- Relatives: Arch Jelley (son)

Umpiring information
- Tests umpired: 1 (1956)
- Source: Cricinfo, 7 July 2013

Albert Edward Jelley (5 March 1894 – 16 May 1966) was a New Zealand cricket umpire from Dunedin.

Jelley was born in Dunedin in 1894. He was a member of the Ancient Order of Druids and belonged to the Pride of Mornington Lodge, which was the Dunedin suburb where he lived. In 1935, he was elected district president (D.P.).

From 1939, Jelley was president of the Mornington Cricket Club. He stood in one Test match, New Zealand vs. West Indies, in 1956. His father Albert Edward Jelley Sr was also a senior cricket umpire around 1900, and his granddaughter Denise represented New Zealand.

Jelley married Lily May Elizabeth McColl (1891–1975) on 19 December 1919 at First Church of Otago. They had five children; their second son was the athletics coach Arch Jelley (1922–2026).

Jelley died at Wakari Hospital in Dunedin on 16 May 1966 and was buried at Andersons Bay Cemetery. His wife died in 1975.

== See also ==
- List of Test cricket umpires
- West Indian cricket team in New Zealand in 1955–56
