= Athletics at the 1978 Commonwealth Games – Women's 1500 metres =

Women's 1500 metres at the Commonwealth Games

The women's 1500 metres event at the 1978 Commonwealth Games was held on 11 and 12 August at the Commonwealth Stadium in Edmonton, Alberta, Canada.

== Medalists ==
Gold	Silver	Bronze
Mary Stewart; England	Christine Benning; England	Penny Werthner; Canada

== Results ==
=== Heats ===
Held on 11 August

Qualification: First 5 in each heat (Q) and the next 2 fastest (q) qualify for the final.

Rank	Heat	Name	Nationality	Time	Notes
1	2	Mary Stewart	England	4:15.88	Q
2	2	Penny Werthner	Canada	4:16.40	Q
3	1	Christine McMeekin	Scotland	4:16.99	Q
4	1	Alison Wright	New Zealand	4:17.03	Q
5	1	Wayua Kiteti	Kenya	4:17.11	Q
6	1	Christine Benning	England	4:17.19	Q
7	2	Angela Cook	Australia	4:17.45	Q
8	2	Anne Kiprop	Kenya	4:17.54	Q
9	1	Francine Gendron	Canada	4:17.58	Q
10	1	Christina Boxer	England	4:17.90	q
11	2	Hilary Hollick	Wales	4:18.36	Q
12	2	Margaret Coomber	Scotland	4:18.95	q
13	2	Rose Thompson	Kenya	4:20.98	
14	2	Ruth Issack	Tanzania	4:20.98	
15	1	Mwinga Mwanjala	Tanzania	4:21.37	
16	1	Carmen Compton	Australia	4:22.61	
17	1	Debbie Scott	Canada	4:24.36	
18	2	Pamela Reece	Northern Ireland	4:41.46	
19	1	Gladys Konadu	Ghana	4:43.08	
20	1	Theodora Corea	Saint Vincent and the Grenadines	4:53.71	
21	2	Kandasamy Jayamani	Singapore	4:58.52	
22	1	Beatrice Delancy	Turks and Caicos Islands	5:06.90	
	2	Hannah Bantamoi	Sierra Leone	DNS	

=== Final ===
Held on 12 August

Rank	Name	Nationality	Time	Notes
1st place, gold medalist(s)	Mary Stewart	England	4:06.34	
2nd place, silver medalist(s)	Christine Benning	England	4:07.53	
3rd place, bronze medalist(s)	Penny Werthner	Canada	4:08.14	
4	Christine McMeekin	Scotland	4:12.43	
5	Hilary Hollick	Wales	4:12.72	
6	Alison Wright	New Zealand	4:12.93	
7	Francine Gendron	Canada	4:16.88	
8	Angela Cook	Australia	4:17.30	
9	Wayua Kiteti	Kenya	4:18.72	
10	Anne Kiprop	Kenya	4:23.17	
11	Christina Boxer	England	4:26.14	
12	Margaret Coomber	Scotland	4:26.28	
