= Eddie Arnold =

British artistic gymnast (1949–2001)

- Born: 20 November 1949
- Died: 2001 (aged 51–52)

Gymnastics career
- Country represented: (United Kingdom) Great Britain; England
- Club: Leeds Athletic Institute
- Head coach: Dick Gradley
Medal record
Gymnastics
Representing England
Commonwealth Games
Silver medal – second place	1978 Edmonton	team

Edward Randal Arnold (20 November 1949 – 2001) was a gymnast from Moston, Manchester, England, who participated in the Munich Olympics. He died in 2001 due to a heart attack.

Arnold attended Carnegie College 1969–1973, and then studied for a master's degree at Leeds University. After finishing his MA in physical education, he taught gymnastics in the area around London. He also wrote a book on men's gymnastics. Arnold then switched to teaching mathematics; he first taught at Bentley Wood High School and then at Hatch End High School from 1989 through his death.
