= Damiano Musonda =

Zambian long-distance runner

Personal information
- Nationality: Zambian
- Born: 15 August 1945 (age 80)

Sport
- Sport: Long-distance running
- Event: Marathon

Damiano Ngwila Musonda (born 15 August 1945) is a Zambian long-distance runner. He competed in the 5000 metres at the 1972 Summer Olympics and the 10,000 metres and marathon at the 1980 Summer Olympics.

Musonda first became an Olympian at the 1972 Games, where he entered in the 5000 metres. He placed 13th in his heat, running 14:37.4 and losing to Evans Mogaka by 0.2 seconds.

In 1978, Musonda qualified for the Commonwealth Games in both the 5000 m and 10,000 m. In the 5000 m, he finished 9th in his semi-final and failed to advance to the finals by two places. In the 10,000 m, he finished 15th in the finals.

Musonda also qualified for two events at the 1980 Summer Olympics in Moscow. At the 1980 Summer Olympics Parade of Nations, Musonda was a flag bearer for Zambia as their only athlete to compete in multiple individual events. In the 10,000 metres, Musonda finished 9th in his heat and failed to qualify for the finals by four places. In the marathon the following month, Musonda placed 48th overall in 2:42:11 hours.

Outside of the Olympics in 1980 Musonda set personal bests over three distances: 5000 m in 14:01.4, 10,000 m in 30:02.3, and the marathon in 2:22:05 hours.

In 2021, Musonda served on the board of the National Olympic Committee of Zambia.
