= Athletics at the 1978 Commonwealth Games – Men's 10,000 metres =

Men's 10,000 metres at the Commonwealth Games

The men's 10,000 metres event at the 1978 Commonwealth Games was held on 6 August at the Commonwealth Stadium in Edmonton, Alberta, Canada.

== Results ==
Rank	Name	Nationality	Time	Notes
1st place, gold medalist(s)	Brendan Foster	England	28:13.65	
2nd place, silver medalist(s)	Michael Musyoki	Kenya	28:19.14	
3rd place, bronze medalist(s)	Mike McLeod	England	28:34.30	
4	Dave Black	England	28:37.90	
5	Suleiman Nyambui	Tanzania	28:56.65	
6	Tony Simmons	Wales	29:01.23	
7	Joel Cheruiyot	Kenya	29:20.15	
8	Allister Hutton	Scotland	29:30.68	
9	Dick Quax	New Zealand	29:58.00	
10	Alan Thurlow	New Zealand	30:05.24	
11	Samson Kimobwa	Kenya	30:13.40	
12	Shivnath Singh	India	30:26.67	
13	Peter Butler	Canada	31:17.18	
14	Aurelio Falero	Gibraltar	31:31.39	
15	Ngwila Musonda	Zambia	31:59.52	
16	Vincent Rakabaele	Lesotho	32:08.43	
17	Patrick Chiwala	Zambia	32:14.89	
18	Nicholas Akers	Cayman Islands	33:29.01	
19	Motlalepula Thabana	Lesotho	35:32.24	
20	Henry Baptiste	Saint Lucia	35:57.36	
	Paul Bannon	Canada	DNS	
	Bernard James	Saint Vincent and the Grenadines	DNS	
	Baba Ibrahim Suma-Keita	Sierra Leone	DNS	
