= Hamish Carson =

New Zealand athlete (born 1988)

Personal information
- Nationality: New Zealander
- Born: 1 November 1988 (age 38) Paremata, New Zealand
- Height: 181 cm (5 ft 11 in)

Sport
- Sport: Track and field
- Event: 1500 m 5000m
- Club: Wellington Scottish Athletics, Atletiekclub Lyra
- Coached by: Arch Jelley, Tomasz Lewandowski, Rik Didden

Hamish Carson (born 1 November 1988) is a middle distance athlete from New Zealand. He represented his country at the 2016 Summer Olympics in the 1500 metres.

== Career ==
Carson was educated at Kāpiti College.

During his childhood, Carson participated in a wide range of sporting activities, including athletics, field hockey and skiing. Carson took up cross country skiing in Wānaka in the winter of 2001. After two seasons of downhill skiing at Ruapehu, he won the national championships in both the classic and freestyle forms for the M12 age grade. He initially took up harriers to maintain his fitness for cross country skiing. Carson joined a harriers training group coached by Graham Tattersall at the end of 2002, and had his last season of field hockey in 2003. In 2008, he joined Wellington Scottish Athletics Club and was selected for their men's A team to compete in the 2009 National Road Relay Championships being held on the Takahe to Akaroa course.

Carson has been coached by Arch Jelley who is known for coaching New Zealand athlete John Walker to international success including a gold medal in the 1500 m event at the Olympic Games in Montreal in 1976. Although Jelly retired from coaching in 2000, five years later, he agreed to coach Carson, who subsequently represented New Zealand at the 2016 Summer Olympics in the 1500 metres. Jelley retired from coaching once more in 2018.

In May 2016, Carson met the IAAF B standard for the 1500 m, making him eligible for selection to the New Zealand team for the 2016 Summer Olympics. In July 2016, Carson was confirmed as a member of the New Zealand team. At the Olympics Carson finished eighth in his heat and did not advance to the semi-finals.

In March 2018, Carson was selected for the New Zealand team to the IAAF World Indoor Championship in Birmingham, UK. He ran the 3000m after qualifying in NYRR Millrose Games.

In the National Road Relay Championships held in Feilding in 2019, Carson achieved a win for the Wellington Scottish men's team by taking the lead on the last lap, and beating the previous record time for that lap.

In October 2021, Carson joined the Belgian club Atletiekclub Lyra.

In March 2022 Carson was also selected to represent New Zealand at the 3000m at the World Athletics Indoor Championships in Belgrade, Serbia but had to withdraw from the competition after getting sick with COVID-19 a week before the start of the competition. Carson was selected for the New Zealand team to the World Athletics Championships 2022 in Oregon, after achieving a 35-second personal best time of 13:17.27 in a 5000 m race in Spain in May.

== New Zealand Championships ==
In the years from 2010 to 2021, Carson was placed in the top three on multiple occasions in New Zealand championships for the distances 1500 m and 3000 m, with some additional top placings in the longer 10000 m and half-marathon events.

| Year | 1500 m | 3000 m | 10000 m | Half marathon |
|---|---|---|---|---|
| 2010 | 1st | 2nd | | |
| 2011 | 1st | 1st | | |
| 2012 | | | | |
| 2013 | 1st | | | 1st |
| 2014 | 1st | 3rd | 2nd | |
| 2015 | | 1st | | |
| 2016 | 1st | 2nd | | |
| 2017 | | 1st | | |
| 2018 | 1st | | | |
| 2019 | 2nd | | | |
| 2021 | 3rd | | | |

== Personal bests ==
| Event | Time | Venue | Date |
|---|---|---|---|
| 800 m | 1:49.15 | Claremont, USA | 12 April 2014 |
| 1000 m | 2:19.41 | Szczecin, Poland | 15 August 2018 |
| 1500 m | 3:36.25 | Swarthmore, PA, USA | 16 May 2016 |
| Mile | 3:56.72 | Wanganui, New Zealand | 19 January 2016 |
| 3000 m | 7:47.22 | New York, USA | 3 February 2018 |
| 5000 m | 13:17.27 | Huelva, Spain | 25 May 2022 |
| 10000 m | 29:39.28 | Wellington, New Zealand | 9 November 2019 |
| Half-marathon | 1:06:05 | Christchurch, New Zealand | 2 June 2013 |
| Marathon | 2:27:16 | Honolulu, Hawaii, USA | 11 December 2016 |
