= Penny McCarthy =

New Zealand swimmer

Sport
- Country: New Zealand
- Sport: Swimming
Medal record
Women's swimming
Representing New Zealand
Commonwealth Games
Silver medal – second place	1978 Edmonton	100 m butterfly

Penny McCarthy is a New Zealand swimmer. She won the silver medal in the women's 100 metres butterfly representing her country at the 1978 Commonwealth Games in Edmonton, recording a time of 1:02.27, and finishing 0.35 s behind the winner, Wendy Quirk from Canada. She also competed in the 200 metres butterfly at those games, but finished ninth in the heats and did not progress further.

At the 1978 World Swimming Championships in West Berlin, McCarthy finished 12th in the women's 100 metres butterfly. The following year, at the 1978 Australian national swimming championships in Perth, she was second in the women's 100 metres butterfly, behind fellow New Zealander Rebecca Perrott.

== See also ==
- List of Commonwealth Games medallists in swimming (women)
