= Willie Murray (bowls) =

Northern Irish international lawn bowler

Personal information
- Nationality: British (Northern Irish)
- Born: 1940 (age 85–86)

Sport
- Club: Portrush BC
Medal record
Representing combined Ireland
World Outdoor Championships
Bronze medal – third place	1976 Johannesburg	triples
British Isles Championships
Gold medal – first place	1976	triples
Gold medal – first place	1975	fours

William "Willie" Murray is a Northern Irish international lawn and indoor bowler who competed at the Commonwealth Games.

== Biography ==
Murray started bowling aged just 14

Murray represented the Northern Irish team at the 1978 Commonwealth Games in Edmonton, Canada, where he competed in the fours event, with Michael Dunlop, Jimmy Donnelly and Willie Watson.

Murray was runner-up in the singles at the 1970 Irish National Bowls Championships and went on to win the fours' titles in 1974 and 1980 and the singles and triples' titles in 1975.

He won a bronze medal in the triples at the 1976 World Outdoor Bowls Championship in Johannesburg.
