= Jeff Davis (gymnast) =

British gymnast (born 1954)

- Born: 31 March 1954 (age 72)

Gymnastics career
- Discipline: Men's artistic gymnastics
- Country represented: (United Kingdom) Great Britain; England
Medal record
Men's artistic gymnastics
Representing England
Commonwealth Games
Silver medal – second place	1978 Edmonton	Team

Jeffrey Peter Davis (born 31 March 1954) is a British gymnast. He competed in seven events at the 1976 Summer Olympics.
