= Karen Robb =

British gymnast

Personal information
- Nationality: British
Medal record
Gymnastics
Representing England
Commonwealth Games
| Silver medal – second place | 1978 Edmonton | team |

Karen Robb is a British retired gymnast.

== Gymnastics career ==
Robb represented England and won a silver medal in the team event at the 1978 Commonwealth Games in Edmonton, Alberta, Canada.
