= Richard Betham =

Samoan boxer

Richard Betham is a Western Samoan former boxer who competed in the 1978 Commonwealth Games in Edmonton, Canada. He won bronze in the middleweight division after losing his semi-final bout to Philip McElwaine of Australia. In his first bout, Betham defeated Ansil Thomas of Guyana in a quarter-final contest.

Richard Betham is the younger brother of boxer Monty Betham.
