= Joanna Sime =

British gymnast

- Born: 31 May 1962 (age 64) Sheffield, England
- Height: 5 ft 5 in (165 cm)

Gymnastics career
- Discipline: Women's artistic gymnastics
- Country represented: United Kingdom; (5 yrs GBR Team)
- College team: Penn State University
- Club: Steel City
- Head coach: Judy Markell Avener
- Former coaches: Maxwell Sime, Gregor Weiss
- Retired: 1985
Medal record
Gymnastics
Representing England
Commonwealth Games
Silver medal – second place	1978 Edmonton	team

Joanna Sime (born 31 May 1962) is a junior and senior international gymnast who represented Great Britain in the late 1970s.

== Competition record ==
Major championships competed in:

- World School Games, Orleans, France, 1976. Gold medalist team event, bronze medal on balance beam.
- Commonwealth Games, Edmonton, Canada. England team silver medalist. 1978 1978 Commonwealth Games
- World Championships, Strasbourg, France, 1978
- World Championships, Fort Worth, Texas, US 1979
- European Championships, Copenhagen, Denmark, 1979

Invitational competitions:

- Golden Sands Tournament, Varna, Bulgaria 1976,
- Golden Sands Tournament, Varna, Bulgaria 1978 (bronze medal balance beam)
- National High School All Around Invitational, Chicago, US, 1978
- Hungarian Invitational, Pecs, Hungary, 1979
- Romanian Invitational, Bucharest, Romania, 1980.
- Moscow News Tournament, Russia, 1981 Riga Tournament, Latvia, 1981

National championships:

- British National Junior Champion 1976
- British National Apparatus Champion 1978
- British Uneven Bar Champion 1978
- British Floor Champion 1978

== Career ==
Honours: The first unanimous decision in the history of the Tournament; Joanna was voted "Miss Moskovski Novosti" by 250 International journalists as the most charming and beautiful gymnast at the Moscow News Tournament, Russia, 1981.Gymn Forum: 1981 Moscow News Tournament

Awarded The Honour of Master Gymnast by the British Amateur Gymnastics Association for participation in three world-level events.

Sime participated as celebrity sportswomen in children's TV show We are the Champions with Ron Pickering in 1978. We Are the Champions (TV series).

NCAA: Received a full athletic scholarship to the Pennsylvania State University from 1981 to 1985. Received the NCAA Team bronze medal in 1982, coached by Judy Markell Avener. NCAA Women's Gymnastics championshipSime sparkles for lady gymnasts | Archived News | Daily Collegian | psucollegian.com

Professional gymnastics: Took part in the Kurt Thomas's Professional Gymnastics show in Orlando, Florida, 1985. "Gymnastics America".

== Biography ==
Sime was coached by her late father, Max E. Sime, a graduate of Balliol College, Oxford, and a well-known psychologist for his innovative work in cognitive ergonomics and human-computer interaction. He was funded by the Medical Research Council (UK) and was based at the University of Sheffield, at the Department of Applied Psychology, founded by Harry Kay (psychologist) where he headed a scientific research team and collaborated with computer scientists Thomas R. G. Green and Peter B. Warr amongst others, on research into the psychology of programming. 11508.pdf Designing for human-computer communication: M.E. Sime and M.J. Coombs Academic Press, London, pp 338 + x, £29.00 - ScienceDirect

Max Sime was awarded the title of Master Coach by the British Amateur Gymnastics Association, for producing several international gymnasts for Britain, another being Joanna's sister, Katie Sime. He was also made an Honorary Life Member for his contributions to the Woman's Technical Committee and the Board of Control. The "Max Sime Memorial" is awarded each year at the English National Championships to the most artistic and stylish Gymnast to commemorate his considerable contribution to the sport.

Joanna Sime also trained in Washington, D.C., with Margie and Gregor Weiss, parents to top US figure skater, Michael Weiss and also coaches to several National US Champions, notably Stephanie Willem, Shari Mann and Jackie Casello.

As a result of a Sports Aid Foundation Scholarship, while competing at The European Championships in Copenhagen, Sime arranged with then president of the FIG, Yuri Titov, a training trip to the Soviet Union at the Central Army Club in Moscow, where she worked with reigning world champion, Elena Mukhina and became good friends. There she was coached by Mikhail Klimenko and Victor Razumov and began her studies in Russian, for which she received an honors degree from Pennsylvania State University later in her career.

Penn State Nittany Lions NCAA Women's Gymnastics championship
