= Kevin McComb =

New Zealand cyclist

Kevin McComb QSM
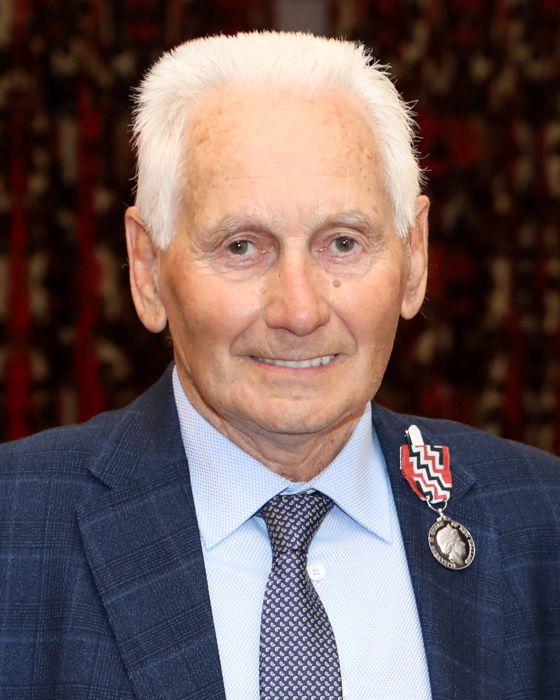
- McComb in 2023

Personal information
- Full name: Kevin James McComb
- Born: 1945 or 1946 (age 80–81)

Cycling career
- Sport: Cycling
- Discipline: Sprint

Kevin James McComb QSM (born 1945 or 1946) is a former New Zealand cyclist and cycling administrator. He represented his country at the 1978 Commonwealth Games, competing in the men's sprint, where he was eliminated in the second-round repechages. He was also originally selected to compete in the men's tandem sprint, but was replaced by Mike Fabish after showing poor form in the lead-up to the games.

In 1987, McComb established the Whakatāne Cycling Club, and served as club president for 32 years, until 2019. In that capacity, he was involved in all aspects of the club's operation, organised community events to promote cycling safety, and led fundraising activities to support local sport cyclists from beginners to elite athletes. For many years, he wrote a weekly cycling column for the Whakatane Beacon newspaper. McComb was made a life member of the Whakatāne Cycling Club in 2021, and he was awarded the Queen's Service Medal, for services to cycling, in the 2023 New Year Honours.
