= Ian Neale =

British gymnast (1954–2025)

- Full name: Ian Geoffrey Neale
- Born: 11 August 1954
- Died: 13 December 2025 (aged 71)

Gymnastics career
- Discipline: Men's artistic gymnastics
- Country represented: (United Kingdom) Great Britain; England
- Club: Coventry GC
- Head coach: John Atkinson
Medal record
Men's artistic gymnastics
Representing England
Commonwealth Games
Silver medal – second place	1978 Edmonton	Team

Ian Geoffrey Neale (11 August 1954 – 13 December 2025) was a British gymnast. He competed in seven events at the 1976 Summer Olympics. Neale died on 13 December 2025, at the age of 71.
