= Lisa Jackman =

British gymnast

Personal information
- Nationality: British
Medal record
Gymnastics
Representing England
Commonwealth Games
Silver medal – second place	1978 Edmonton	team

Lisa Jackman is a British retired gymnast.

== Gymnastics career ==
Jackman represented England and she won a silver medal in the team event, at the 1978 Commonwealth Games in Edmonton, Alberta, Canada.
