= Jerome Drayton =

Canadian long-distance runner (1945–2025)

Personal information
- Nationality: Canadian
- Born: January 10, 1945 Kolbermoor, Gau Munich-Upper Bavaria, Germany
- Died: February 10, 2025 (aged 80) Toronto, Ontario, Canada

Sport
- Country: Canada
- Sport: Men's Athletics
- Event: Marathon
- Club: Toronto Olympic Club
Medal record
Commonwealth Games
Silver medal – second place	1978 Edmonton	Marathon

Jerome Peter Drayton (January 10, 1945 – February 10, 2025) was a Canadian long-distance runner who competed internationally.

A prominent runner in the 1970s, Drayton was for a time ranked as the top marathoner in the world. He won the Fukuoka Marathon in 1969, 1975, and 1976, as well as the Boston Marathon in 1977. His Canadian men's national record time in the marathon of 2:10:09, set in 1975 at the Fukuoka Marathon, stood for 43 years until broken by Cam Levins in October 2018 with a time of 2:09:25 in the Toronto Waterfront Marathon. Drayton had held the Canadian record since 1969, after breaking the then record of 2:18:55 set by Robert Moore a month earlier.

== Biography ==
Drayton was born as Peter Buniak on January 10, 1945, in Munich, Germany, to parents of Russian-Ukrainian background. Having been born as the Second World War was coming to an end and extreme poverty was widespread, Drayton and his parents had travelled to Germany from Poland aboard a cattle train. Drayton's parents eventually divorced and his mother, who had custody of him, moved to Canada and then brought Drayton over to Toronto in November 1956 when he was 11 years old. Taking up running in high school, Drayton won the Ontario high school championships for Mimico High School and he was recruited to the Toronto Olympic Club where he began working with national distance running coach Paul Poce.

In March 1969, he changed his name to Jerome Peter Drayton. He reportedly based his new name on two famous sprinters he admired: Canadian former world record holder Harry Jerome and American Paul Drayton, former world record holder in the 4 × 100 m as part of the American relay team. However, Drayton denied this, stating that he chose Jerome because it was a name he had always liked, and Drayton because he thought the two names fit well together.

Drayton died from complications during knee surgery in Toronto on February 10, 2025, at the age of 80.

== Achievements ==
Year	Competition	Venue	Position	Event	Notes
Representing Canada
1969	Motor City Marathon	Detroit, Michigan	1st	Marathon	2:12:00
1969	Fukuoka Marathon	Fukuoka, Japan	1st	Marathon	2:11:13
1973	Canadian Championships	St. John's, Newfoundland	1st	Marathon	2:13:27
1974	Boston Marathon	Boston, Massachusetts	3rd	Marathon	2:15:41
1975	Fukuoka Marathon	Fukuoka, Japan	1st	Marathon	2:10:09 PR
1976	Olympic Games	Montréal, Canada	6th	Marathon	2:13:30
1976	Fukuoka Marathon	Fukuoka, Japan	1st	Marathon	2:12:35
1977	Boston Marathon	Boston, United States	1st	Marathon	2:14:46
1977	New York City Marathon	New York City	2nd	Marathon	2:13:52
1978	Commonwealth Games	Edmonton, Canada	2nd	Marathon	2:16:14
1979	Boston Marathon	Boston, Massachusetts	11th	Marathon	2:14:48
1979	National Capital Marathon	Ottawa, Canada	1st	Marathon	2:18:05

== See also ==
- Canadian records in track and field
- List of winners of the Boston Marathon
