= Paul Ballinger =

New Zealand long-distance runner

Paul Ballinger (born 25 March 1953) is a retired long-distance runner from New Zealand, who won the 1982 edition of the Fukuoka Marathon, clocking 2:10:15 on 5 December 1982 setting the current national record. A year later he finished in 27th place (2:16:06) at the inaugural 1983 World Championships. He is a four-time national champion for New Zealand in the marathon.

At the 1978 Commonwealth Games he finished 6th in the marathon with a time of 2:17:46.

== Achievements ==
- All results regarding marathon, unless stated otherwise

Year	Competition	Venue	Position	Notes
Representing New Zealand
1978	Commonwealth Games	Edmonton, Canada	6th	2:17:46
1981	Fukuoka Marathon	Fukuoka, Japan	11th	2:14:04
1982	Fukuoka Marathon	Fukuoka, Japan	1st	2:10:15
1983	World Championships	Helsinki, Finland	27th	2:16:06

== Personal bests ==
Distance	Time	Place	Date
Marathon	2:10:15 NR	Fukuoka	1982

== See also ==
- National records in the marathon
