= Heather Matthews =

New Zealand middle-distance runner

Heather Matthews MBE
Personal information
- Born: 1946 (age 79–80)

Sport
- Country: New Zealand
- Sport: Track and field
Medal record
Women's athletics
Representing New Zealand
Commonwealth Games
Silver medal – second place	1978 Edmonton	3000 m

Heather Jean Matthews MBE (formerly Thomson; born 1946) is a New Zealand middle-distance runner.

She competed at the 1978 Commonwealth Games, winning a silver medal in the women's 3000 m.

In the 1980s, she turned to international road relays, and more recently has managed New Zealand road relay teams. She was appointed a Member of the Order of the British Empire, for services to athletics, in the 1988 New Year Honours.

She is featured in the New Zealand short film On the Run training adjacent to the Auckland Airport.
