= Lynette Brake =

New Zealand gymnast

Lynette Farkash
Personal information
- Born: Lynette Brake

Sport
- Country: New Zealand
- Sport: Gymnastics
Medal record
Representing New Zealand
Women's gymnastics
Commonwealth Games
Bronze medal – third place	1978 Edmonton	Team all-around

Lynette Farkash (née Brake) is a former New Zealand gymnast. She won a bronze medal representing her country—alongside Kirsty Durward, Rowena Davis and Deborah Hurst—in the women's all-around team event at the 1978 Commonwealth Games. Also at those games, she finished 17th in the women's individual all-round.

Farkash was the manager and head women's artistic gymnastics coach at Mid-Island Gym Sports in Rotorua.
