= Arch Jelley =

New Zealand athletics coach (1922–2026)

Arch Jelley CNZM OBE
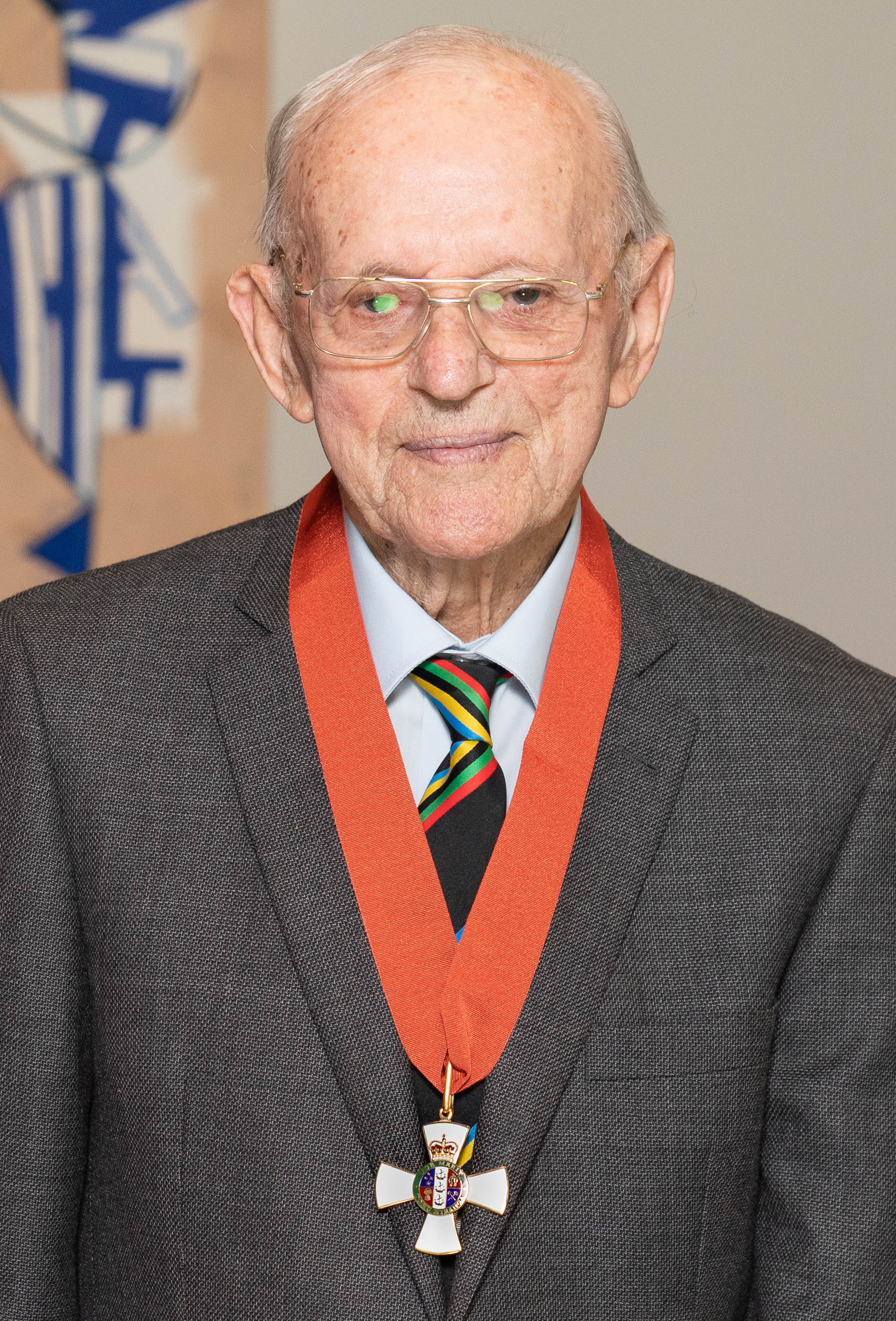
- Jelley in 2021
- Born: Albert Archibald Jelley; 13 August 1922; Dunedin, New Zealand
- Died: 24 October 2026 (aged 104)
- Years active: 1957–2018
- Known for: Athletics coaching
- Spouses: Rachel Jelley (m. 1953; died 2000); Jean Jelley (m. 2002)
- Children: 8, including stepchildren (Note: Exact number of biological or adopted children unknown.)
- Father: Albert Jelley

Albert Archibald Jelley CNZM OBE (13 August 1922 – 24 October 2026) was a New Zealand athletics coach who coached leading New Zealand athletes including John Walker and Hamish Carson. He was an athletics coach for over six decades and coached at Olympic level up until his mid-90s. Jelley was also a teacher, athletics administrator, and a bridge tutor.

== Life and career ==
=== Early life and education ===
Jelley was born in Dunedin on 13 August 1922, into a family that was heavily involved in sport. His father, Albert Edward Jelley, was a first-class cricket umpire. He had four siblings.

He was a pupil at Mornington School from 1927 to 1935, and joined the Mornington Harrier Club at the age of 18.

=== Military and teaching career ===
Jelley served in the Royal New Zealand Naval Volunteer Reserve during World War II, acquiring a commissioned officer rank and being deployed on Russian Convoy duties. He returned to New Zealand to begin studies at Dunedin Teachers' College and at the University of Otago. He began his teaching career in rural Wanganui and then moved to Wellington. In January 1957, he moved to Auckland. In 1966, he became the founding principal of Sunnybrae Normal School on the North Shore, serving in that role for more than 20 years.

=== Coaching career ===
Jelley began coaching athletics in 1957. He took Neville Scott to the 5000 metres final at the 1964 Summer Olympics and helped Ian Studd win bronze in the mile at the 1966 British Empire and Commonwealth Games.

Jelley is best known for coaching middle-distance runner John Walker, who broke the world mile record with the first sub 3:50 mile in history in 1975, running it in 3:49.4. Walker won the gold medal for the 1500 metres at the 1976 Montreal Olympics. Jelley also coached Dick Quax (2nd in the 5000 m) and Rod Dixon (4th in the 5000 m) at the 1976 Montreal Olympics.

He coached dozens of other leading athletes during his career, including 1988 Seoul Olympic 3000 m runner Christine Pfitzinger, two-time Olympic distance runner Robbie Johnston, 1987 World Championship marathoner Hazel Stewart, 1990 Commonwealth 10,000 m bronze medallist Barbara Moore, 1978 Commonwealth Games middle-distance representatives Dennis Norris and Alison Wright, and former US mile record-holder Steve Scott, who was fifth in the 1988 Olympic 1500 m final.

Jelley retired from coaching in 2000, to put more time into bridge and lawn bowls. However, five years later, he agreed to coach Hamish Carson, who subsequently represented New Zealand at the 2016 Summer Olympics in the 1500 metres. Jelley retired from coaching once more in 2018.

=== Mt Albert Bridge Club ===
Jelley's first wife Rachel knew he was a keen card player and encouraged him to attend the Mt Albert Bridge Club, where he was involved from 1990. He was a tutor from 1996 and was president for ten years from 2003.

=== Personal life and death ===
In 1953, Jelley married Rachel, who died in 2000. In 2002, Jelley married Jean, whom he met through playing bridge, and between them they had eight children, 16 grandchildren and seven great-grandchildren.

Jelley celebrated his 100th birthday in August 2022, saying: "Turning 100 doesn't feel any different than how I've ever felt – I think it's just a bit of a shock when you first look at that number". He died on 24 October 2026, at the age of 104.

== Honours and awards ==
In the 1982 New Year Honours, Jelley was appointed an Officer of the Order of the British Empire, for services to athletics. Along with Arthur Lydiard, he was one of four coaches inducted into the New Zealand Coaches Hall of Fame. In 1987, he was awarded an International Amateur Athletic Federation Diploma.

In 2007, Jelley received a Sparc lifetime achievement award for coaching excellence, and an Athletics New Zealand merit award in 2009.

Jelley was appointed a Companion of the New Zealand Order of Merit in the 2021 New Years Honours, for his work as a coach and an administrator in athletics and bridge.
