= Athletics at the 1978 Commonwealth Games – Women's 3000 metres =

Women's 3000 metres at the Commonwealth Games

The women's 3000 metres event at the 1978 Commonwealth Games was held on 7 August at the Commonwealth Stadium in Edmonton, Alberta, Canada. It was the first time that this event was held at the Commonwealth Games.

== Results ==
Rank	Name	Nationality	Time	Notes
1st place, gold medalist(s)	Paula Fudge	England	9:12.95	
2nd place, silver medalist(s)	Heather Thomson	New Zealand	9:20.69	
3rd place, bronze medalist(s)	Ann Ford	England	9:24.05	
4	Shauna Miller	Canada	9:30.75	
5	Nancy Rooks	Canada	9:34.14	
6	Angela Cook	Australia	9:43.56	
7	Mwinga Mwanjala	Tanzania	9:49.98	
8	Rose Thompson	Kenya	10:00.46	
9	Debbie Scott	Canada	10:02.59	
10	Wayua Kiteti	Kenya	10:12.56	
11	Dinah Chepyatur	Kenya	10:18.49	
12	Modesta Masaka	Tanzania	10:45.79	
13	Kandasamy Jayamani	Singapore	11:13.01	
14	Beatrice Delancy	Turks and Caicos Islands	11:20.87	
	Penny Yule	England	DNF	
	Theodora Corea	Saint Vincent and the Grenadines	DNF	
