= Athletics at the 1978 Commonwealth Games – Men's 3000 metres steeplechase =

Men's 3000 metres steeplechase at the Commonwealth Games

The men's 3000 metres steeplechase event at the 1978 Commonwealth Games was held on 6 and 7 August at the Commonwealth Stadium in Edmonton, Alberta, Canada.

The winning margin was 5.67 seconds which as of 2024 remains the only time since the introduction of automatic timing that the men's 3,000 metres steeplechase was won by more than 5 seconds at these championships.

== Medalists ==
| Gold | Silver | Bronze |
|---|---|---|
| Henry Rono; Kenya | James Munyala; Kenya | Kip Rono; Kenya |

== Results ==
=== Heats ===
Held on 6 August

Qualification: First 5 in each heat (Q) and the next 2 fastest (q) qualify for the final.

| Rank | Heat | Name | Nationality | Time | Notes |
|---|---|---|---|---|---|
| 1 | 2 | Henry Rono | Kenya | 8:26.3 | Q |
| 2 | 1 | Kip Rono | Kenya | 8:31.8 | Q |
| 3 | 1 | John Davies | Wales | 8:48.1 | Q |
| 4 | 1 | Dennis Coates | England | 8:48.4 | Q |
| 5 | 1 | Howard Healey | New Zealand | 8:48.4 | Q |
| 6 | 2 | Anthony Staynings | England | 8:50.8 | Q |
| 7 | 2 | Euan Robertson | New Zealand | 8:53.1 | Q |
| 8 | 2 | Ian Gilmour | Scotland | 8:56.5 | Q |
| 9 | 1 | James Munyala | Kenya | 8:57.9 | Q |
| 10 | 1 | Joe Sax | Canada | 8:59.2 | q |
| 11 | 2 | John Wild | England | 8:59.9 | Q |
| 12 | 2 | Rob Evans | Canada | 9:05.3 | q |
| 13 | 2 | Dean Childs | Canada | 9:09.77 | |
| 14 | 2 | Paul Lawther | Northern Ireland | 9:19.20 | |

=== Final ===
Held on 7 August

| Rank | Name | Nationality | Time | Notes |
|---|---|---|---|---|
| 1st place, gold medalist(s) | Henry Rono | Kenya | 8:26.54 | |
| 2nd place, silver medalist(s) | James Munyala | Kenya | 8:32.21 | |
| 3rd place, bronze medalist(s) | Kip Rono | Kenya | 8:34.07 | |
| 4 | Euan Robertson | New Zealand | 8:41.32 | |
| 5 | Howard Healey | New Zealand | 8:43.75 | |
| 6 | Dennis Coates | England | 8:47.35 | |
| 7 | Anthony Staynings | England | 8:48.87 | |
| 8 | Ian Gilmour | Scotland | 8:49.68 | |
| 9 | John Wild | England | 8:57.94 | |
| 10 | John Davies | Wales | 9:01.95 | |
| 11 | Rob Evans | Canada | 9:06.43 | |
| 12 | Joe Sax | Canada | 9:15.27 | |
