= Winfield Braithwaite =

Guyanese boxer

Medal record
Men's Boxing
Representing Guyana
Commonwealth Games
Gold medal – first place	1978 Edmonton	Light-welterweight

Winfield Braithwaite is a retired Guyanese light-welterweight boxer, who represented his country at the 1978 Commonwealth Games in Edmonton, Canada. There he won the gold medal in the light-welterweight division, defeating Alec Leatherday of Australia, Baba Sumaila of Ghana, Michael Mwangi of Kenya and finally, James Douglas of Scotland in the final by knockout in the first round. It was the first gold medal won by a Guyanese athlete at the Commonwealth Games since runner Phil Edwards won the 880 yards in 1934.

In 1980, Braithwaite moved to the USA and retired from boxing. Although unbeaten in a fairly short professional career, one match against fellow Guyanese ‘Teacher’ McKenzie ended in a draw.

In 2019, the Guyana Boxing Association renamed the Caribbean School Boys and Juniors Tournament in Braithwaite's honor.
