= Vince Smith (boxer) =

English boxer

Personal information
- Nationality: England
Medal record
Boxing
Representing England
Commonwealth Games
Silver medal – second place	1978 Edmonton	light heavyweight

Ronald Vincent 'Vince' Smith is a retired boxer who competed for England.

== Boxing career ==
Smith represented England and won a silver medal in the light-heavyweight (-81 Kg) division, at the 1978 Commonwealth Games in Edmonton, Alberta, Canada.

He was the National Champion in 1978 after winning the prestigious 1978 ABA light-heavyweight Championship, boxing for the Kyrle Hall ABC.
