= Delroy Parkes =

Retired boxer who competed for England

Personal information
- Nationality: England
Medal record
Boxing
Representing England
Commonwealth Games
Silver medal – second place	1978 Edmonton	middleweight

Delroy Parkes is a British retired boxer who competed for England.

== Boxing career ==
Parkes represented England and won a silver medal in the middleweight (-75 Kg) division, at the 1978 Commonwealth Games in Edmonton, Alberta, Canada.

Parkes was National Championship runner-up to Herol Graham in the prestigious 1978 ABA middleweight Championship, boxing for the Royal Air Force.
