= Michael Dunlop (bowls) =

Northern Irish international lawn bowler

Personal information
- Nationality: British (Northern Irish)
- Born: c.1958

Sport
- Club: Ormeau BC, Belfast

Michael Dunlop (born c.1958) is a former international lawn bowler from Northern Ireland who competed at the Commonwealth Games.

== Biography ==
Dunlop was a member of the Ormeau Bowls Club of Belfast and was capped by Ireland for the first time in June 1977, becoming the youngest player in history to play for Ireland.

Dunlop represented the Northern Irish team at the 1978 Commonwealth Games in Edmonton, Canada, where he competed in the fours event, with Willie Murray, Willie Watson, Jimmy Donnelly. Aged just 18 at the time, Dunlop received the honour of being the flag bearer at the opening ceremony of the Games.

He was the singles runner-up of Ireland behind Jeremy Henry at the 1996 Irish National Bowls Championships.
