= Athletics at the 1978 Commonwealth Games – Men's javelin throw =

Men's javelin throw at the Commonwealth Games

The men's javelin throw event at the 1978 Commonwealth Games was held on 12 August at the Commonwealth Stadium in Edmonton, Alberta, Canada.

== Results ==
Rank	Name	Nationality	Result	Notes
1st place, gold medalist(s)	Phil Olsen	Canada	84.00	
2nd place, silver medalist(s)	Mike O'Rourke	New Zealand	83.18	
3rd place, bronze medalist(s)	Peter Yates	England	78.58	
4	Brian Roberts	England	75.10	
5	David Ottley	England	74.28	
6	Luc Lapierre	Canada	73.44	
7	Manfred Rohkamper	Australia	71.74	
8	John Mayaka	Kenya	70.00	
9	Robert Moulder	Bermuda	69.64	
10	John Corazza	Canada	69.14	
11	Zakayo Malekwa	Tanzania	64.12	
12	Andre Taylor	Turks and Caicos Islands	43.96	
