= Jack Swart =

New Zealand cyclist (born 1954)

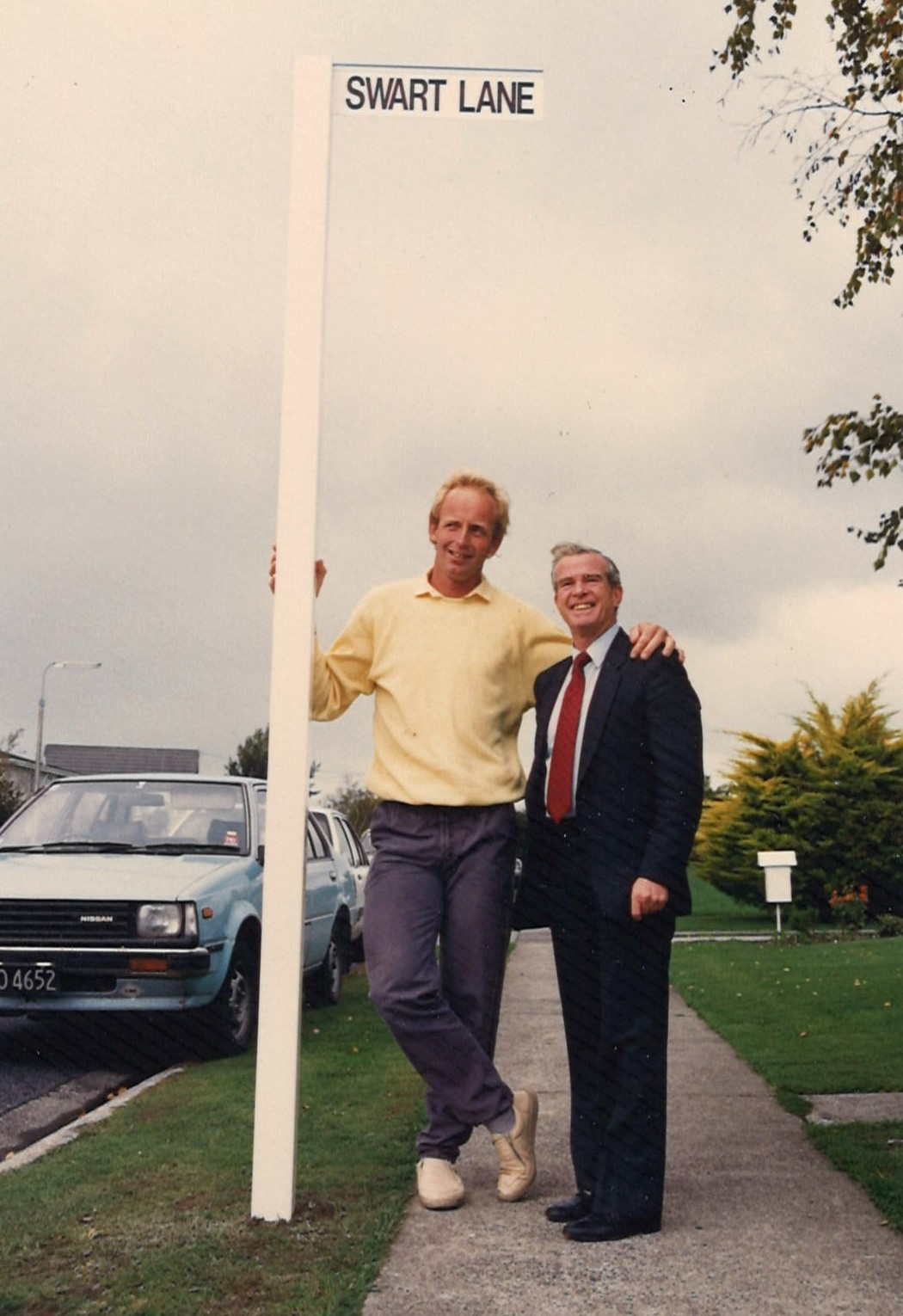
- Swart at opening of Swart Lane (1987)
- Born: 27 November 1954; Tuakau, New Zealand
- Known for: NZ road cyclist

Jack Swart
Medal record

Men's cycling

Representing New Zealand

British Commonwealth Games
Silver medal – second place	1978 Edmonton	Team Pursuit
Bronze medal – third place	1982 Brisbane	Team Time Trial

Jacobus "Jack" Johannes Swart (born 1954) is a former New Zealand road cyclist.

In the 1978 Commonwealth Games he competed in the 4000m team pursuit, coming 2nd for silver; and the 4000m individual pursuit. .

In the 1982 Commonwealth Games he competed in the Team time trial, coming 3rd for bronze; and the Road Race, coming 15th.

He was not chosen for the 1984 Summer Olympics despite a world-class performance in the Coors International in Colorado, the selectors apparently regarded him as a tour rider not an individual racer despite having won two New Zealand road championships.

He was described as "the blond-haired giant of New Zealand cycling for the best part of a decade through to 1986". Swart and Blair Stockwell were the only two riders to win the "Dulux North Island Tour" three times.

He was born in Tuakau to a dairy farmer from the Netherlands; his younger brother Stephen Swart was also a champion road cyclist.

== Honorific eponym ==
Swart Lane, in the Hamilton suburb of Chartwell, is named in Jack Swart's honour.
