= David McCord Wright =

American economist

David McCord Wright (1909–1968) was an American economist and educator at the University of Georgia. He was a graduate of Harvard University.

== Personal ==
Wright was born in Savannah, Georgia. He married Caroline Noble Jones and had three children: Anna, Antony and Peter.

== Professional ==
=== Teaching ===
Wright was an economics professor at the University of Virginia; he also served as an advisor to the U.S. Federal government. Wright took a professorship at the University of Georgia's Terry College of Business from 1962 until his death in 1968. The Economics Department sponsors the annual David McCord Wright Lecture.

Some of Wright's students are former U.S. Senator Phil Gramm, Ronald Reagan's Budget Director Jim Miller and the former Dallas Federal Reserve chief Bob McTeer. McTeer recalls his teacher repeating the lesson, "Growth comes through change and causes change." McTeer's 2000 Wright Lecture memorialized both Wright's teachings and life.

=== Books ===
Wright published many articles and books during his life. Some of them are The Keynesian System, (ISBN 978-0-313-24090-4), which was part four of The Miller Lectures, The Trouble with Marx in 1967 and Democracy and Progress in 1948. In The Trouble With Marx, Dr. Wright foretold the decline and fall of the Soviet system. His critical analysis explained how the inherent rigidity of central planning and command economies of Marxist–Leninist regimes inhibit economic growth by suppressing the essential quality needed for growth: change which fosters further growth. The Trouble with Marx was also used his Comparative Economic Systems course which he taught in summer sessions at the Naval War College at Newport, Rhode Island.
