= Deborah Hurst =

New Zealand gymnast

Personal information
- Born: Deborah Linda Richards
- Relative: Merv Richards (father)

Sport
- Country: New Zealand
- Sport: Gymnastics
Medal record
Representing New Zealand
Women's gymnastics
Commonwealth Games
Bronze medal – third place	1978 Edmonton	Team all-around

Deborah Linda Murphy (formerly Hurst, née Richards) is a former New Zealand gymnast. Competing as Deborah Hurst, she won a bronze medal representing her country—alongside Kirsty Durward, Rowena Davis and Lynette Brake—in the women's all-around team event at the 1978 Commonwealth Games. Also at those games, she finished eighth in the women's individual all-around.
