= Terry Manners =

New Zealand marathon runner

Terence Gordon Manners (born 19 October 1939 in Levin) is a former marathon runner from New Zealand.

In the 1972 marathon at Munich he came 34th. In the 1974 marathon at Christchurch he came in 4th, with a personal best of 2:12:58.6. In the 1978 marathon at Edmonton he placed 13th.
