= Kelly Perlette =

Canadian boxer

Kelly Perlette is a Canadian boxer, who fought southpaw. He was the 1978 Commonwealth Games Light Middle Weight Gold Medal Champion. He was unable to compete in the 1980 Olympics because of Canada's decision to boycott the games. He grew up in Spruce Grove and is a member of the Spruce Grove Hall of Fame. He currently resides in Edmonton, Alberta.

== Sources ==
- boxrec.com
- http://www.sprucegrove.org/Residents/Community_Information/Spruce_Grove_-_Awards_of_Excellence/Inductees/2007_Inductees.htm
