= David Wright (swimming coach) =

Swimming coach, born 1948

David Alexander Wright (born 3 March 1948) is a New Zealand swimming coach.

== Biography ==
Wright was born in Lawrence in Otago. He attended Wairoa College in New Zealand, Thorp High School in Wisconsin, and Victoria University of Wellington.

Wright is an ASCA International Level 5 swimming coach. He has coached national swimming representatives from New Zealand, the United States Virgin Islands, the United States and Saudi Arabia. Most notable students include New Zealand national and/or US state champions and/or Saudi Arabian champions Toni Jeffs, Nichola Chellingworth, Jane Copland, Rhi Jeffrey and Oswaldo Quevedo.

Notable events include the award of US Swimming's Certificate of Excellence in 2007, appointment in 2003/2004 as national coach for the US Virgin Islands. In association with track coach Arthur Lydiard and New Zealand international swimmer Jane Copland published two books on swimming Swim to the Top (ISBN 1841260835), June 2002 and Swimming–A Training Program (ISBN 1841261424), April 2004. He is a contributor to the swimming website swimwatch.net.

Prior to his career as a swimming coach, Wright coached track athletes including his wife Alison Wright, who represented New Zealand, Oceania and the United Kingdom over 800, 1500 and 3000 metres.
