= David Wright (academic) =

Canadian historian

David Wright is a professor of history at McGill University in Montreal, Canada. He is the current Canada Research Chair in the History of Health Policy.

== Early life and education ==
Wright completed both a Bachelor of Arts and a Master of Arts in history at McGill University. He then completed a Doctor of Philosophy (DPhil) in history at the University of Oxford. He finally completed a post-doctoral research fellowship specializing in the history of health and medicine at the University of Oxford.
