= Athletics at the 1978 Commonwealth Games – Men's 5000 metres =

Men's 5000 metres at the Commonwealth Games

The men's 5000 metres event at the 1978 Commonwealth Games was held on 8 and 10 August at the Commonwealth Stadium in Edmonton, Alberta, Canada.

== Medalists ==
Gold	Silver	Bronze
Henry Rono; Kenya	Michael Musyoki; Kenya	Brendan Foster; England

== Results ==
=== Heats ===
Held on 8 August

Qualification: First 6 in each heat (Q) and the next 3 fastest (q) qualify for the final.

Rank	Heat	Name	Nationality	Time	Notes
1	1	Suleiman Nyambui	Tanzania	13:51.15	Q
2	1	Kipsubai Koskei	Kenya	13:51.48	Q
3	1	Michael Musyoki	Kenya	13:53.24	Q
4	1	David Fitzsimons	Australia	13:55.81	Q
5	1	Nick Rose	England	13:57.75	Q
6	1	Tony Simmons	Wales	13:57.76	Q
7	2	Henry Rono	Kenya	14:02.15	Q
8	2	Rod Dixon	New Zealand	14:08.02	Q
9	2	Mike McLeod	England	14:08.54	Q
10	1	Allister Hutton	Scotland	14:09.16	q
11	2	Lawrie Spence	Scotland	14:09.64	Q
12	2	Brendan Foster	England	14:10.28	Q
13	2	Nathaniel Muir	Scotland	14:10.35	Q
14	2	Steve Jones	Wales	14:10.76	q
15	1	Alan Thurlow	New Zealand	14:27.19	q
16	1	John Charvetto	Gibraltar	14:33.78	
17	1	Neil Hendry	Canada	14:40.88	
18	2	Aurelio Falero	Gibraltar	14:56.45	
19	2	Ngwila Musonda	Zambia	15:00.52	
20	2	Mohapi Mphafi	Lesotho	15:25.55	
21	2	Peter Butler	Canada	15:43.85	
22	1	Nicholas Akers	Cayman Islands	15:45.44	
23	2	Lewis Swann	Turks and Caicos Islands	18:37.91	
24	2	Godfrey Bowen	Cayman Islands	19:29.48	
	1	Dick Quax	New Zealand	DNS	
	1	John Davies	Wales	DNS	
	2	Paul Lawther	Northern Ireland	DNS	

=== Final ===
Held on 10 August

Rank	Name	Nationality	Time	Notes
1st place, gold medalist(s)	Henry Rono	Kenya	13:23.04	
2nd place, silver medalist(s)	Michael Musyoki	Kenya	13:29.92	
3rd place, bronze medalist(s)	Brendan Foster	England	13:31.35	
4	Mike McLeod	England	13:33.20	
5	Suleiman Nyambui	Tanzania	13:34.08	
6	Nathaniel Muir	Scotland	13:34.94	
7	Tony Simmons	Wales	13:39.81	
8	Rod Dixon	New Zealand	13:43.69	
9	Allister Hutton	Scotland	13:50.06	
10	Kipsubai Koskei	Kenya	13:52.54	
11	Steve Jones	Wales	13:54.59	
12	Nick Rose	England	13:55.18	
13	Lawrie Spence	Scotland	14:28.10	
	Alan Thurlow	New Zealand	DNF	
	David Fitzsimons	Australia	DNS	
