= Kirsty Durward =

New Zealand gymnast (died 2020)

Kirsty Gerlach
Personal information
- Born: Kirsty Elizabeth Durward; 1958 or 1959 Te Puke, New Zealand
- Died: 13 September 2020 (aged 61) Rotorua, New Zealand
- Spouse: Steve Gerlach (m. 1981)

Sport
- Country: New Zealand
- Sport: Gymnastics
- University team: Long Beach State 49ers
- Coached by: Steve Gerlach
Medal record
Representing New Zealand
Women's gymnastics
Commonwealth Games
Bronze medal – third place	1978 Edmonton	Team all-around

Kirsty Elizabeth Gerlach (née Durward; 1958 or 1959 – 13 September 2020) was a New Zealand gymnast. She won a bronze medal representing her country in the women's all-around team event at the 1978 Commonwealth Games.

== Biography ==
Gerlach was born Kirsty Elizabeth Durward in Te Puke in about 1959, one of six children of Lois and Peter Durward. She was educated at Rotorua Girls' High School, becoming a national gymnastics champion, and won a full scholarship to California State University, Long Beach when she was 17 years old.

Durward was recruited to Long Beach State by coach Marion Duncan, but Duncan had departed by the time that Durward arrived. From 1977 to 1980, Durward won four consecutive silver medals in vault at the AIAW National Women's Collegiate Gymnastics Championships. She was inducted into the Long Beach State Athletics Hall of Fame in 1997.

Durward represented New Zealand at the 1978 Commonwealth Games in Edmonton, placing tenth in the women's individual all-around competition, and winning the bronze medal—alongside Lynette Brake, Rowena Davis and Deborah Hurst—in the women's team all-around.

In 1981, Durward married her Long Beach State gymnastics coach, Steve Gerlach. The couple went on to have four children, and lived between New Zealand and the United States. Initially, Steve Gerlach continued coaching in New Zealand and overseas, and Kirsty Gerlach established an audiology practice in Rotorua. They settled permanently at Lake Ōkareka, near Rotorua, in 2002.

Kirsty Gerlach was diagnosed with motor neuron disease in 2017, and shortly after had to retire from her 33-year career as an audiologist. A 25-minute documentary film, called Kirsty, about Gerlach's illness, was made by a film student, Keziah Manabat, from the South Seas Film and TV School, in 2019, and was a finalist at the 2020 Watersprite Film Festival in Britain.

Gerlach died from her illness on 13 September 2020.
