= Julius Awome =

English boxer (born 1953)

Personal information
- Nationality: (England) English
- Born: 1953 Birmingham
- Died: 1995 (aged 41–42) Hampshire

Sport
- Sport: Boxing
Medal record
Boxing
Representing England
Commonwealth Games
Gold medal – first place	1978 Edmonton	heavyweight

Julius Joseph Awome (born 1953) is a retired English boxer.

== Boxing career ==
He represented England and won a gold medal in the -91 kg heavyweight division, at the 1978 Commonwealth Games in Edmonton, Alberta, Canada.

Awome was the National Champion in 1978 after winning the prestigious ABA featherweight title, boxing out of Woking ABC.
