= Rowena Davis =

New Zealand gymnast (born c. 1964)

Rowena Geisreiter
Personal information
- Born: Rowena Davis; 1964 or 1965 (age 60–61)
Medal record
Representing New Zealand
Women's gymnastics
Commonwealth Games
Bronze medal – third place	1978 Edmonton	Team all-around

Rowena Geisreiter (née Davis; born 1964 or 1965) is a former New Zealand gymnast.

Davis represented her country at the 1978 Commonwealth Games in Edmonton, placing ninth in the women's individual all-around competition, and winning the bronze medal—alongside Lynette Brake, Kirsty Durward and Deborah Hurst—in the women's team all-around event. The following year, aged 14, Davis represented New Zealand at the world championships in Fort Worth, where her performance was good enough to earn selection in the New Zealand team for the 1980 Summer Olympics. However, she was unable to compete because of the partial boycott by New Zealand. Four years later, she qualified for the 1984 Summer Olympics, but was not included in the New Zealand team by the New Zealand Olympic and Commonwealth Games Association.

She lived in Dunedin, where she was a mountain biking coach and ran cycle skills programmes in local schools.
