= Brian Maxwell =

British-born Canadian athlete, coach and entrepreneur (1953-2004)

- Born: March 14, 1953; London, England, United Kingdom
- Died: March 19, 2004 (aged 51); San Anselmo, California, United States
- Education: University of California, Berkeley (BA)
- Occupations: athlete, coach, businessman
- Spouse: Jennifer Maxwell

Brian Leigh Maxwell (March 14, 1953 – March 19, 2004) was a British born Canadian track and field athlete, track coach, entrepreneur, and philanthropist. He founded PowerBar, a maker of energy and nutritional products for athletes. Maxwell initially never intended to become a marathon runner, but lacked the speed necessary to be competitive at shorter distances. Despite being told as a teenager of his congenital heart condition, he persevered, and by 1977, he was ranked third among all marathoners by Track and Field News. At age 51, he died of a heart attack at a local post office.

== Early life ==
Maxwell grew up in Toronto, Ontario, Canada, where he attended Victoria Park Secondary School (now Victoria Park Collegiate Institute), and he was a member of the Victoria Park Track Club (not associated with the school). The club was coached by Commonwealth Games shot put gold medalist Dave Steen. While at Victoria Park, he was awarded the Arnold Trophy for excellence in academics and athletics.

In 1975, Maxwell graduated with a Bachelor of Arts degree in architecture from the University of California, Berkeley, where he was on the Golden Bears track team. As an outstanding student on the team, he won the Brutus Hamilton Award, named after the University's long-time coach.

== Elite athlete and coach ==
After graduating from UC Berkeley, Maxwell frequently represented Canada as a long distance runner. He won his first marathon, in 1975, in Canada, and competed in the 1978 Commonwealth Games. He was the top qualifier for the three-member Canadian 1980 Olympic marathon team that did not participate in the games in Moscow due to the U.S.-led boycott. His fastest marathon was 2:14:43 in 1977. He won the Ottawa National Capitol Marathon that year. He also won the Enschede, Netherlands, marathon that year, in 2:15:14, breaking Ron Hill's course record. Maxwell went on to serve as the cross country and distance running coach at UC Berkeley, helping four team members become NCAA Division I All-Americans in cross country and track and field. Tom Downs, Jr., the first of those at Berkeley to win that honor when he finished 13th at the nationals in 1981, attributed that to Maxwell's regimen of having his runners alternate easy and very hard training days, to push them to their limits.

== PowerBar ==
Maxwell started the PowerBar company with his girlfriend, Jennifer Biddulph, a nutritionist who later became his wife. Maxwell developed the idea of an energy bar after dropping out of a marathon at 21-mile (34 km), at about the segment of the 42-kilometre (26 mi) event known among runners as "The Wall", where experts say the body ceases burning carbohydrates and begins burning muscle tissue instead. In the kitchen of their Berkeley, California, home, the couple began developing snack bar recipes with both simple and complex carbohydrates.

== Other business interests ==
In late 2000, Maxwell invested in the Active Network Inc. (Active.com), helping establish the company as the leading provider of data management and online registration services for fitness events. By 2001, Maxwell joined Active's board of directors. He also chaired Game Ready, which manufactured devices to assist healing of sports injuries.

== Legacy ==
In addition to helping promote many fitness events and sponsoring numerous athletes, Maxwell and his wife contributed generously to UC Berkeley, from which both graduated. The former Kleeberger Field was renamed Maxwell Family Field after the couple donated funds to replace the artificial surface. Located just north of UC Berkeley's Memorial Stadium, the field serves as home to the university's hockey, football and lacrosse programs. Jennifer Maxwell also endowed a full-tuition scholarship, the Brian L. Maxwell Fellowship, at the Haas School of Business. Maxwell Fellowships are intended to memorialize the drive, creativity, and entrepreneurial spirit which led Maxwell to achieve success in business and his athletic pursuits. There has been an annual award named after Maxwell at the high school he attended, Victoria Park Collegiate Institute, which is given to a student who excels in athletics and academics while at Victoria Park. He also donated the well-equipped Fitness Room at the Institute.

Maxwell is survived by his wife, Jennifer, and six children. Their daughter, Julia, was a standout cross country runner, and her mother and grandmother, Barbara Magid, were top competitors in the arduous and venerable age-and-gender handicapped Dipsea Race, first run in 1905. Julia finished fourth in that competition at 13-years-old. Julia competed for Stanford University where she received a double major degree in nutrition and anthropology.
