= Neil Lyster =

New Zealand cyclist (born 1947)

Personal information
- Full name: Neil Robert Lyster
- Born: 2 December 1947 (age 78) Wellington, New Zealand
- Height: 5 ft 10 in (1.78 m)

Cycling career
- Sport: Cycling
- Discipline: Track
- Role: Rider
Medal record
Men's track cycling
Representing New Zealand
Commonwealth Games
Silver medal – second place	1978 Edmonton	Team pursuit

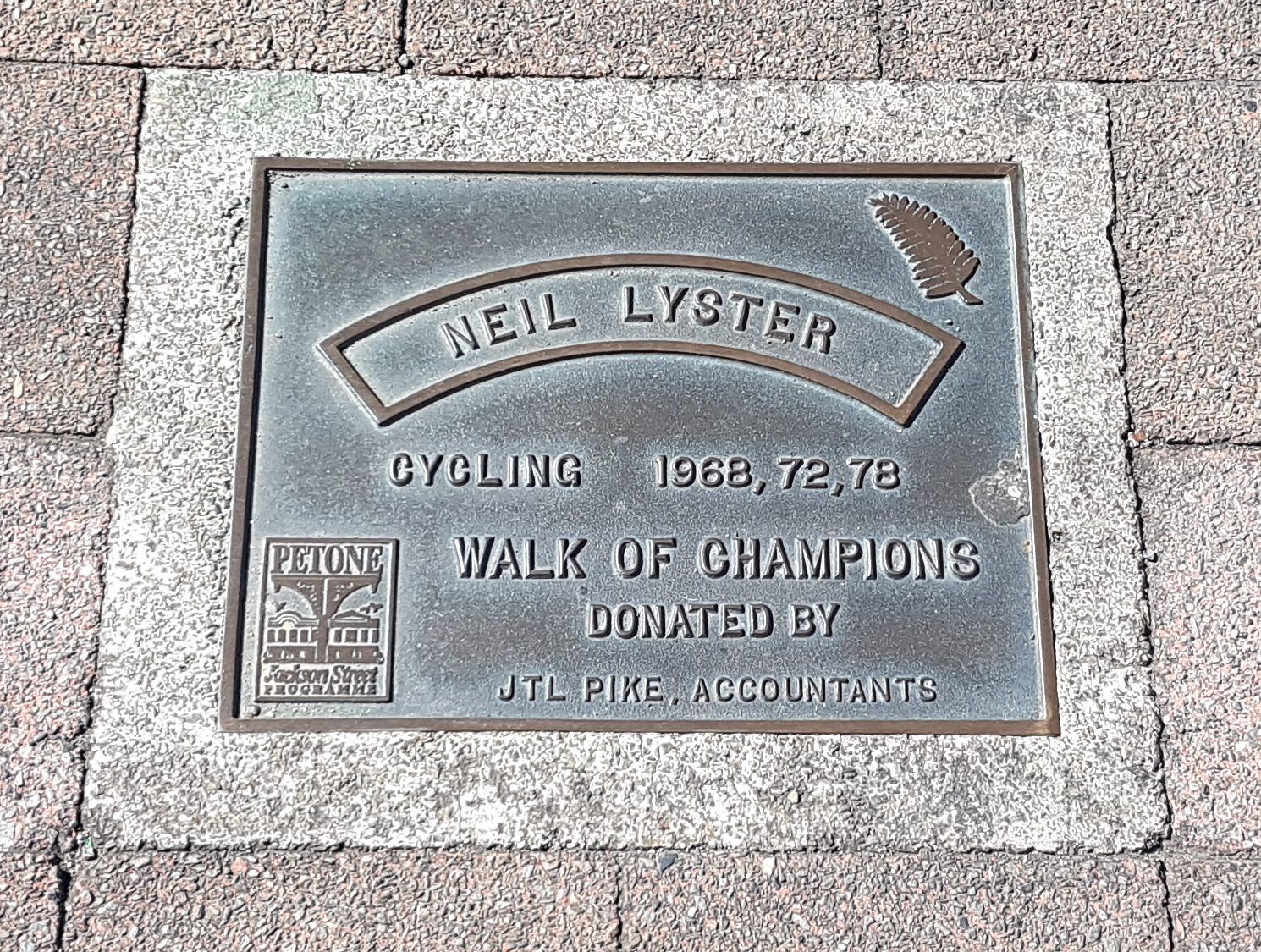
Plaque in Petone, Wellington

Neil Robert Lyster (born 2 December 1947) is a road and track cyclist from New Zealand.

He competed in two Olympic Games, 1968, 1972 and was team manager during one Olympic Games 1976.

He competed in the 1978 Commonwealth Games, where he was the flagbearer at the opening ceremony, and won a silver in the 4000m Men's Team Pursuit.
