= Alison Wright (athlete) =

Former New Zealand athlete

Personal information
- Born: 1 December 1949 (age 76) Christchurch, New Zealand
- Spouse: David Wright

Sport
- Country: New Zealand
- Sport: Athletics
- Event: middle-distance
- Coached by: Arch Jelley, David Wright

Alison Joyce Wright (born 1 December 1949) is a former New Zealand middle-distance runner.

== Biography ==
Wright attended Fendalton Open Air School in Christchurch, Fairfield College in Hamilton and Victoria University of Wellington in Wellington.

Wright represented her country in the 1978 Commonwealth Games at 800 metres and 1500 metres, and one week later finished third behind Christine Benning in the 3,000 metres event at the British 1978 WAAA Championships.

Wright was the holder of the New Zealand 1000 metres record with a time of 2.38.54 set in the Berlin Olympic Stadium on 17 August 1979 until Angie Petty ran 2.37.28 in Tokyo in 2015. Although not recognised as a record at the time Alison's time was eventually ratified over 25 years later. In late 2011, Wright's time of 4:16.7 from January 1981 was also ratified as the official New Zealand women's indoor 1500 metres record though it remained the record for only a few months until it was beaten early in 2012 by Lucy van Dalen. Wright was also the 1500 metres national champion of New Zealand, Scotland and the United Kingdom (indoors).

Wright represented Oceania in the 1979 World Cup Finals in Montreal, Canada. She represented Scotland in the World Cross Country Championships in Madrid in 1981 and the United Kingdom in dual meets in 1981 and 1982. She achieved the 800 metres qualifying standard for the Moscow Olympic Games. Her selection was affected by the international boycott of those Games.

== Personal bests ==
Distance	Time	Place	Date
800 m	2:02.7	Cologne	1979
1000 m	2:38.54 NR	Berlin	1979
1500 m	4:11.68	Zurich	1979
3000 m	9:00.85	Cork	1981
