= Philip McElwaine =

Australian boxer

Personal information
- Born: 5 December 1957 (age 68) Maitland, New South Wales, Australia
Medal record
Men's Boxing
Representing Australia
Commonwealth Games
Gold medal – first place	1978 Edmonton	Middleweight

Philip McElwaine (born 5 December 1957) is an Australian boxer and motorcycle club member. He was born in Maitland, New South Wales. He competed at the 1976 Summer Olympics in Montreal. He was the Middleweight Gold medalist in the 1978 Commonwealth Games.

In 1984, McElwaine was arrested and charged with seven counts of murder for his part in the Milperra massacre. The charges were later reduced to that of affray after police acted as character witnesses for him, stating that McElwaine, who was a volunteer at the Police and Community Youth Club, was "a monument to the police boys' movement as a whole." McElwaine was the only club member to be acquitted of the manslaughter and murder charges that were brought against them.
