= Boxing at the 1976 Summer Olympics – Lightweight =

Olympic boxing tournament

Lightweight boxing at the Games of the XXI Olympiad
- Venue: Maurice Richard Arena, Montreal
- Dates: 18–31 July 1976
- Competitors: 23 from 23 nations

Medalists
1st place, gold medalist(s)		Howard Davis	United States
2nd place, silver medalist(s)		Simion Cuțov	Romania
3rd place, bronze medalist(s)		Ace Rusevski	Yugoslavia
3rd place, bronze medalist(s)		Vassily Solomin	Soviet Union

The men's lightweight event was part of the boxing programme at the 1976 Summer Olympics. The weight class allowed boxers of up to 60 kilograms to compete. The competition was held from 18 to 31 July 1976. 23 boxers from 23 nations competed.

== Medalists ==
Gold	Howard Davis; United States
Silver	Simion Cuțov; Romania
Bronze	Ace Rusevski; Yugoslavia
Bronze	Vassily Solomin; Soviet Union

== Results ==
The following boxers took part in the event:

Rank	Name	Country
1	Howard Davis	United States
2	Simion Cuțov	Romania
3T	Ace Rusevski	Yugoslavia
3T	Vassily Solomin	Soviet Union
5T	Ove Lundby	Sweden
5T	Tsvetan Tsvetkov	Bulgaria
5T	András Botos	Hungary
5T	Yves Jeudy	Haiti
9T	Nelson Calzadilla	Venezuela
9T	Bogdan Gajda	Poland
9T	Leonidas Asprilla	Colombia
9T	Georgios Agrimanakis	Greece
9T	Parviz Bahmani	Iran
9T	Reinaldo Valiente	Cuba
15T	Ernesto González	Nicaragua
15T	Khaidavyn Altankhuyag	Mongolia
15T	Antonio Rubio	Spain
15T	Sylvester Mittee	Great Britain
15T	Hans Henrik Palm	Denmark
15T	Yukio Segawa	Japan
15T	Roberto Andino	Puerto Rico
22T	Gaetano Pirastu	Italy
22T	Gerard Hamill	Ireland

=== First round ===
- Roberto Andino (PUR) def. Gaetano Pirastu (ITA), 5:0
- Ace Rusevski (YUG) def. Gerard Hamill (IRL), 4:1

=== Second round ===
- Nelson Calzadilla (VEN) def. Ernesto Gonzalez (NIC), 5:0
- Simion Cuțov (ROM) def. Sylvester Mittee (GBR), RSC-3
- Rashad Abdelgaffar Zaki (EGY) – Lewrence Obagoriola (NGA), both walk-over
- Ove Lundby (SWE) def. Newton Chisanga (ZAM), walk-over
- Bogdan Gajda (POL) def. Cleveland Denny (GUY), walk-over
- Vassily Solomin (URS) def. Hans Henrik Palm (DEN), 5:0
- Georgios Agrimavakis (GRE) def. Bechir Jilassi (TUN), walk-over
- András Botos (HUN) def. David Ssensonjo (UGA), walk-over
- Leonidas Asprilla (COL) def. Balcha Degefu (ETH), walk-over
- Howard Davis (USA) def. Yukio Segawa (JPN), 5:0
- Tsvetan Tsvetkov (BUL) def. Khaidav Altanhuiag (MGL), 5:0
- Parviz Bahmani (IRN) def. Nasreddin El-Agely (LIB), walk-over
- Yves Jeudy (HAI) def. David Oleme (CMR), walk-over
- Abderrahim Souihi (MAR) – Kwami Ayigan (TOG), both walk-over
- Reinaldo Valiente (CUB) def. Antonio Rubio (ESP), 5:0
- Ace Rusevski (YUG) def. Roberto Andino (PUR), RSC-3

=== Third round ===
- Simion Cuțov (ROM) def. Nelson Calzadilla (VEN), 5:0
- Ove Lundby (SWE) – no opponent (bye)
- Vassily Solomin (URS) def. Bogdan Gajda (POL), 5:0
- András Botos (HUN) def. Georgios Agrimavakis (GRE), 4:1
- Howard Davis (USA) def. Leonidas Asprilla (COL), RSC-2
- Tsvetan Tsvetkov (BUL) def. Parviz Bahmani (IRN), 5:0
- Yves Jeudy (HAI) – no opponent (bye)
- Ace Rusevski (YUG) def. Reinaldo Valiente (CUB), 5:0

=== Quarterfinals ===
- Simion Cuțov (ROM) def. Ove Lundby (SWE), 5:0
- Vassily Solomin (URS) def. András Botos (HUN), 5:0
- Howard Davis (USA) def. Tsvetan Tsvetkov (BUL), RSC-3
- Ace Rusevski (YUG) def. Yves Jeudy (HAI), RSC-2

=== Semifinals ===
- Simion Cuțov (ROM) def. Vassily Solomin (URS), 5:0
- Howard Davis (USA) def. Ace Rusevski (YUG), 5:0

=== Final ===
- Howard Davis (USA) def. Simion Cuțov (ROM), 5:0
