= Cycling at the 1978 Commonwealth Games =

- Venue: Track: Argyll Velodrome; Road: North Saskatchewan River Valley
- Location: Edmonton, Canada
- Dates: 3 to 12 August 1978

Cycling at the 1978 Commonwealth Games was the 10th appearance of Cycling at the Commonwealth Games. The events were held in Edmonton, Canada, from 3 to 12 August 1978.

The track events were held at Argyll Velodrome, specifically constructed for the Games. The concrete surface was 333 metres, 7 metres wide with a 37 degree bank.

The road race ran along the North Saskatchewan River Valley over a 117 miles distance consisting of 15 laps of 7.8 miles.

Australia topped the cycling medal table, by virtue of winning two more silver medals than hosts Canada.

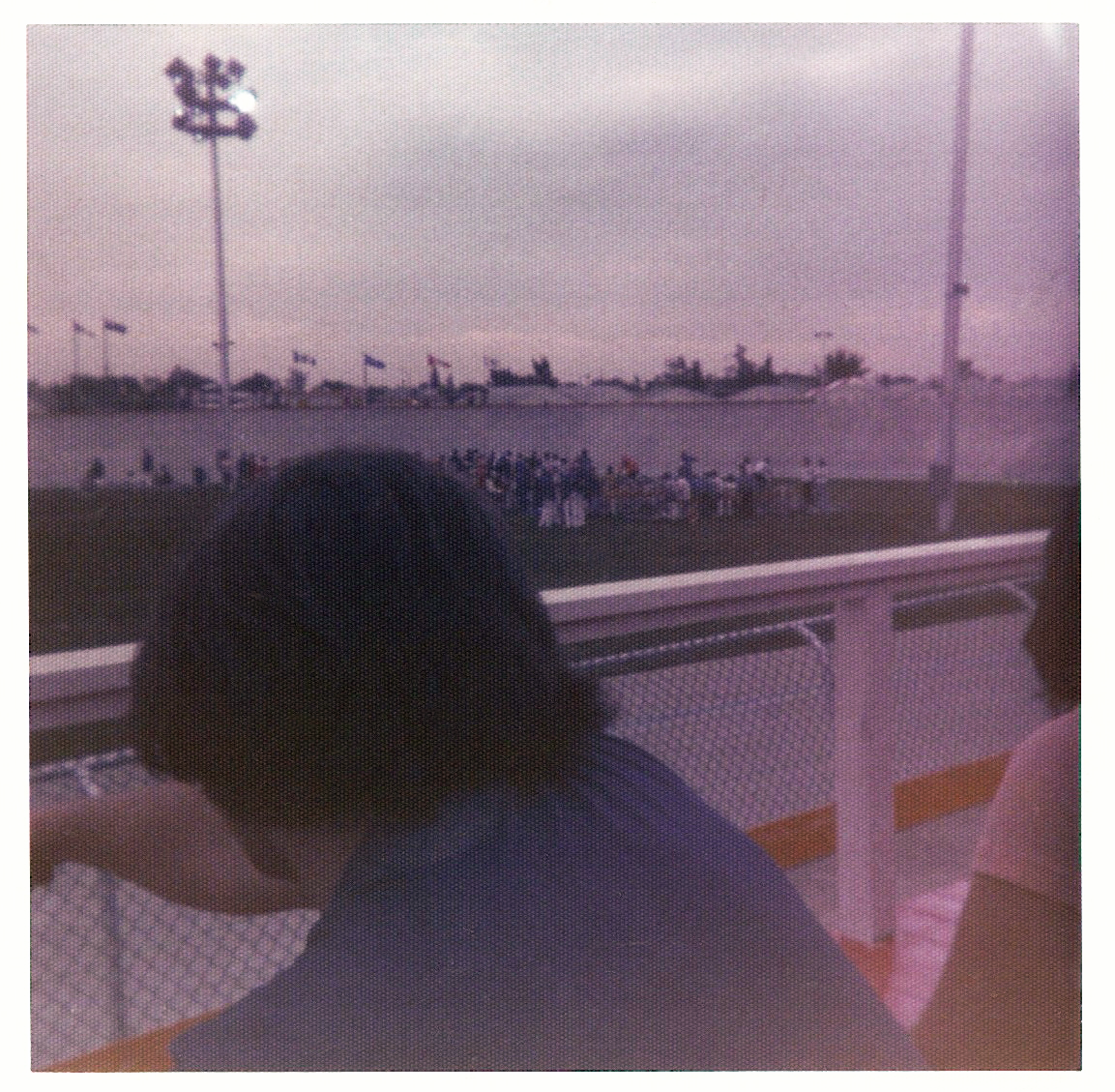
A cycling event at the Argyll Velodrome during the 1978 Commonwealth Games

== Medal table ==
* Host nation (Canada)

Medals won by nation with totals, ranked by number of golds—sortable
Rank	Nation	Gold	Silver	Bronze	Total
1	Australia	3	3	2	8
2	Canada*	3	1	1	5
3	New Zealand	1	1	1	3
4	England	0	2	2	4
5	Jamaica	0	0	1	1
Totals (5 entries)		7	7	7	21

== Medallists ==
Event	Gold	Silver	Bronze
Time trial	Jocelyn Lovell; Canada	Kenrick Tucker; Australia	Gordon Singleton; Canada
Sprint	Kenrick Tucker; Australia	Trevor Gadd; England	David Weller; Jamaica
Individual pursuit	Mike Richards; New Zealand	Gary Campbell; Australia	Tony Doyle; England
Team pursuit	Australia; Colin Fitzgerald; Kevin Nichols; Gary Sutton; Shane Sutton	New Zealand; Kevin Blackwell; Anthony Cuff; Neil Lyster; Jack Swart	England; Tony Doyle; Paul Fennell; Tony James; Glen Mitchell
10 miles scratch	Jocelyn Lovell; Canada	Shane Sutton; Australia	Gary Sutton; Australia
Tandem	Jocelyn Lovell; Gordon Singleton; Canada	Trevor Gadd; David Le Grys; England	Ron Boyle; Steve Goodall; Australia
Road race	Phil Anderson; Australia	Pierre Harvey; Canada	Garry Bell; New Zealand

== Results ==
=== Road race ===
Phil Anderson won the gold after winning a three-man sprint for the line. He had earlier fallen and remounted during the race. The course was said to be a tree lined twisting circuit and considerably less punishing than the 1974 course. The race started at 7 a.m., with 49 riders competing in intermittent rain.

Pos	Athlete	Time
1	(Australia) Phil Anderson	4:22:34.41 hours
2	(Canada) Pierre Harvey	4:22:34.55
3	(New Zealand) Garry Bell	4:22:35.06
4	(Isle of Man) John Purvis	4:23:27.43
5	(England) Steve Lawrence	4:23:28.31
6	(Canada) Martin Cramaro	4:23:29.48
7	(England) Des Fretwell	4:23:44.79
8	(Canada) Ronald Leslie Hayman	4:23:44.81
9	(Australia) Remo Sansonetti	4:23:45.07
10	(Canada) Eon D'Ornella	4:23:46.03
11	(England) Bob Downs	4:23:46.18
12	(Wales) Neil Hodge	4:23:46.37
13	(Isle of Man) Mark Gage	4:23:46.50
14	(Isle of Man) Eward Kewley	4:23:46.66
15	(Scotland) Alex Gilchrist	4:23:46.82
16	(Northern Ireland) Archie Cunningham	4:23:47.10
17	(Hong Kong) Fai-lui Chan	4:23:47.80
18	(New Zealand) Stephen Cox	4:23:47.91
19	(Australia) Sal Sansonetti	4:23:48.35
20	(New Zealand) Vern Hanaray	4:23:48.61
21	(Jersey) Allan Miller	4:23:48.75
22	(Northern Ireland) Billy Kerr	4:23:48.91
23	(Scotland) Robert Millar	4:23:49.08
24	(Jamaica) Errol Walters	4:24:14.13
25	(Scotland) John Clark	4:24:15.70
26	(Wales) Colin Thornton	4:24:15.71
27	(Isle of Man) Stephen Joughin	4:31:19.58
28	(Northern Ireland) Len Kirk	4:35:07.85
29	(England) Phil Griffiths	4:35:07.89
30	(New Zealand) Blair Stockwell	4:35:08.10
31	(Australia) Robert James Glindemann	4:39:24.61
32	(Northern Ireland) Joe Smyth	4:42:00.45

=== 10 miles scratch race ===
Pos	Athlete	Time
1	(Canada) Jocelyn Lovell	20:05.81 mins
2	(Australia) Shane Sutton	20:06.00
3	(Australia) Gary Sutton	20:06.10
4	(England) Tony Doyle	20:06.20
5	(England) Glen Mitchell	20:06.32
6	(New Zealand) Anthony Cuff	20:06.45
7	(Australia) Michael Turtur	20:06.52
8	(England) Paul Fennell	20:06.54
9	(Wales) David Patten	20:06.60
10	(New Zealand) Neil Lyster	20:06.70
11	(Canada) David Watkins	20:06.90
12	(Isle of Man) Edward Kewley	20:07.59
13	(Scotland) Roy Crombie	20:07.66
14	(Isle of Man) Mark Gage	20:07.84
15	(Northern Ireland) Tom Greene	20:07.88
16	(Canada) Steve Bauer	20:08.20
17	(Isle of Man) Michael Kelly	Allan Miller
18	(New Zealand) Mike Richards	20:08.40
19	(Scotland) Ian Humphreys	20:09.08
20	(Wales) John Tudor	20:10.09
21	(Jamaica) David Weller	20:13.56
22	(Northern Ireland) Pat Shearer	20:14.85
23	(Scotland) John Clark	20:15.66
24	(Guyana) Aubrey Gordon	20:18.83
25	(Trinidad and Tobago) Leslie Rawlins	20:22.01
26	(Wales) Phillip Taylor	20:23.03
27	(Jamaica) Peter Aldridge	20:23.56
28	(Jamaica) Xavier Mirander	20:24.19

=== 4,000m individual pursuit ===
Pos	Athlete
1	(New Zealand) Mike Richards
2	(Australia) Gary Brian Campbell
3	(England) Tony Doyle
4	(Canada) Ronald Leslie Hayman
5	(Australia) Kelvin Poole
5	(Australia) Gary Sutton
5	(New Zealand) Jack Swart
5	(England) Phil Griffiths

Quarter-final

Athlete	Athlete	Score
Richards	Sutton	4.50.50/4.58.60
Campbell	Griffiths	4.55.85/5.05.55
Doyle	Swart	4.55.38/5.02.29
Hayman	Poole	4.57.13/4.57.35

Semi finals

Athlete	Athlete	Score
Richards	Hayman	caught
Campbell	Doyle	4.49.89/4.53.86

Third place

Athlete	Athlete	Score
Doyle	Hayman	4.55.87/4.56.85

Final

Athlete	Athlete	Score
Richards	Campbell	4.49.74/4.55.68

=== Time trial (1km) ===
Pos	Athlete	Time
1	(Canada) Jocelyn Lovell	1:06.00
2	(Australia) Kenrick Tucker	1:06.96
3	(Canada) Gordon Singleton	1:07.56
4	(Australia) Colin Fitzgerald	1:07.75
5	(England) Trevor Gadd	1:08.10
6	(Australia) Steve Goodall	1:08.66
7	(New Zealand) Charles Michael Fabish	1:08.75
8	(New Zealand) Anthony Cuff	1:08.85
9	(New Zealand) Mike Richards	1:08.99
10	(Jamaica) David Weller	1:09.11
11	(Canada) Ward Robert Kemerer	1:09.25
12	(Barbados) Hector Edwards	1:09.27
13	(Jamaica) Xavier Mirander	1:09.57
14	(Barbados) Charles Pile	1:10.26
15	(England) Paul Fennell	1:10.67
16	(England) Paul Swinnerton	1:10.73
17	(Barbados) Steven Greenidge	1:10.74
18	(Trinidad and Tobago) Leslie Rawlins	1:11.45
19	(Wales) John Tudor	1:11.81
20	(Trinidad and Tobago) Ricardo Alonzo	1:11.99

=== 1,000m match sprint ===
Pos	Athlete
1	(Australia) Kenrick Tucker
2	(England) Trevor Gadd
3	(Jamaica) David Weller
4	(Canada) Gordon Singleton
5	(Jamaica) Xavier Mirander
6	(Australia) Michael Turtur
7	(New Zealand) Charles Michael Fabish
8	(Trinidad and Tobago) Leslie Rawlins

Quarter-final

Athlete	Athlete	Score
Tucker	Fabish	2–0
Gadd	Rawlins	2–0
Weller	Turtur	2–0
Singleton	Mirander	2–0

Semi finals

Athlete	Athlete	Score
Tucker	Singleton	2–0
Gadd	Weller	2–0

Third place

Athlete	Athlete	Score
Weller	Singleton	2–0 (11.53 & 11.45)

Final

Athlete	Athlete	Score
Tucker	Gadd	2–0 (11.14 & 11.47)

=== Tandem (2,000m) ===
Pos	Athlete
1	(Canada) Jocelyn Lovell & Gordon Singleton
2	(England) Trevor Gadd & David Le Grys
3	(Australia) Steve Goodall & Ron Boyle
4	(New Zealand) Mike Fabish & Eric McKenzie

Semi finals

Team	Team	Score
Canada	Australia	2–0 (11.26)
England	New Zealand	1–1 (disq & fall w/o)

Third place

Team	Team	Score
Australia	New Zealand	w/o

Final

Team	Team	Score
Canada	England	2–0 (15.52 & w/o)

=== Team pursuit ===
Pos	Athlete
1	(Australia) Fitzgerald, Nichols, G Sutton, S Sutton
2	(New Zealand) Blackwell, Cuff, Lyster, Swart
3	(England) Doyle, Fennell, James, Mitchell
4	(Canada) Garneau, Sudermann, Bauer, Kemerer
5	(Northern Ireland) Kirk, Greene, Smyth, Shearer
6	(Scotland) Clark, Crombie, Humphreys, Whitehall
7	(Wales) Hamilton, Patten, Pritchard, Taylor

Qualifying

- Australia 4.31.13
- New Zealand 4.35.30
- England 4.35.34
- Canada 4.47.46
- Northern Ireland 4.50.76
- Scotland 4.50.00
- Wales 4.50.54

Semi finals

Team	Team	Time
New Zealand	England	4:36.70/4.40.62
Australia	Canada	caught

Third place

Team	Team	Time
England	Canada	4.51.18/4.58.99

Final

Team	Team	Time
Australia	New Zealand	4:29.43/4.37.73
