= Yugoslavia at the 1976 Summer Olympics =

- Flag of SFR Yugoslavia
- IOC code: YUG
- NOC: Yugoslav Olympic Committee

in Montreal
- Competitors: 88 (83 men, 5 women) in 14 sports
- Flag bearer: Hrvoje Horvat
- Medals Ranked 16th: Gold 2 Silver 3 Bronze 3 Total 8

Summer Olympics appearances (overview)
- 1920; 1924; 1928; 1932; 1936; 1948; 1952; 1956; 1960; 1964; 1968; 1972; 1976; 1980; 1984; 1988; 1992; 1996; 2000

Other related appearances
- Serbia (1912, 2008–pres.); Croatia (1992–pres.); Slovenia (1992–pres.); Bosnia and Herzegovina (1992 S–pres.); Independent Olympic Participants (1992 S); North Macedonia (1996–pres.); Serbia and Montenegro (1996–2006); Montenegro (2008–pres.); Kosovo (2016–pres.)

Athletes from the Socialist Federal Republic of Yugoslavia competed at the 1976 Summer Olympics in Montreal, Quebec, Canada. 88 competitors, 83 men and 5 women, took part in 52 events in 14 sports.

On 26 July a Croatian nationalist ran onto the field of play during the men's handball match between Yugoslavia and West Germany and burned the Yugoslav flag.

== Medalists ==
Medal	Name	Sport	Event
Gold	Matija Ljubek	Canoeing	Men's 1000m Canadian Singles
Gold	Momir Petković	Wrestling	Men's Greco-Roman Middleweight
Silver	Tadija Kačar	Boxing	Men's Light Middleweight
Silver	Ivan Frgić	Wrestling	Men's Greco-Roman Bantamweight
Silver	Krešimir Ćosić; Dražen Dalipagić; Mirza Delibašić; Blagoja Georgievski; Vinko Jelovac; Željko Jerkov; Dragan Kićanović; Andro Knego; Zoran Slavnić; Damir Šolman; Žarko Varajić; Rajko Žižić	Basketball	Men's Team Competition
Bronze	Matija Ljubek	Canoeing	Men's C1 500m Canadian Singles
Bronze	Ace Rusevski	Boxing	Men's Lightweight
Bronze	Slavko Obadov	Judo	Men's Middleweight (80 kg)

== Archery ==
In the first time the nation competed in Olympic archery, Yugoslavia entered one man. He came in ninth place, missing a top eight finish by only one point.

Men's Individual Competition:

- Bojan Postruznik – 2421 points (→ 9th place)

== Athletics ==
Men's 400 metres

- Josip Alebić

- Heat — 46.94 (→ did not advance)

Men's 800 metres

- Luciano Sušanj

- Heat — 1:47.82
- Semi Final — 1:47.03
- Final — 1:45.75 (→ 6th place)

- Milovan Savić

- Heat — 1:47.73 (→ did not advance)

Men's 10.000 metres

- Dušan Janićijević

- Heat — 28:48.87 (→ did not advance)

Men's High Jump

- Danial Temim

- Qualification — 2.10m (→ did not advance)

Men's Long Jump

- Nenad Stekić

- Qualification — 7.82m
- Final — 7.89m (→ 6th place)

Men's 20 km Race Walk

- Vinko Galušić — 1:34:46 (→ 24th place)

== Basketball ==
=== Men's team competition ===
- Preliminary Round

- Yugoslavia – Puerto Rico 84:63 (38:29)
- Yugoslavia – Czechoslovakia 99:81 (51:43)
- Yugoslavia – United States 93:112 (55:51)
- Yugoslavia – Italy 88:87 (41:57)
- Yugoslavia – Egypt 20:0 b.b.

- Semifinals

- Yugoslavia – Soviet Union 89:84 (42:42)

- Final

- Yugoslavia – United States 74:95 (38:50) → Silver Medal

- Team Roster

- Blagoja Georgievski
- Dragan Kićanović
- Vinko Jelovac
- Rajko Žižić
- Željko Jerkov
- Andro Knego
- Zoran Slavnić
- Krešimir Ćosić
- Damir Šolman
- Žarko Varajić
- Dražen Dalipagić
- Mirza Delibašić

== Boxing ==
Lightweight (– 60 kg)

- Ace Rusevski → Bronze Medal
  - First round
    - Defeated Gerard Hamill (IRL) 4–1
  - Second round
    - Defeated Roberto Andino (PUR) RSC-3
  - Third round
    - Defeated Reinaldo Valiente (CUB) 5–0
  - Quarterfinals
    - Defeated Yves Jeudy (HAI) RSC-2
  - Semifinals
    - Lost to Howard Davis (USA) 0–5

== Cycling ==
Two cyclists represented Yugoslavia in 1976.

Sprint

- Vlado Fumić — 21st place

1000m time trial

- Vlado Fumić — 1:13.037 (→ 24th place)

Individual pursuit

- Bojan Ropret — 22nd place

== Water polo ==
=== Men's team competition ===
- Team Roster

- Boško Lozica
- Damir Polić
- Dejan Dabović
- Đuro Savinović
- Dušan Antunović
- Miloš Marković
- Ozren Bonačić
- Predrag Manojlović
- Siniša Belamarić
- Uroš Marović
- Zoran Kačić
