= Cycling at the 1976 Summer Olympics – Men's sprint =

Men's sprint at the Games of the XXI Olympiad
- Venue: Montreal, Quebec, Canada
- Dates: 21–24 July 1976
- Competitors: 25 from 25 nations

Medalists
1st place, gold medalist(s)		Anton Tkáč; Czechoslovakia
2nd place, silver medalist(s)		Daniel Morelon; France
3rd place, bronze medalist(s)		Jürgen Geschke; East Germany

The men's sprint at the 1976 Summer Olympics in Montreal, Canada, was held from 21 to 24 July 1976. There were 25 participants from 25 nations. Following the explosion in size of the event from 1960 to 1972, when nations were allowed two cyclists each, the limit was again reduced to one competitor from each nation. The event was won by Anton Tkáč of Czechoslovakia, the nation's first medal in the men's sprint. Tkáč beat two-time defending champion Daniel Morelon of France in the final; Morelon's silver was a (still-standing record fourth medal in the event. Jürgen Geschke earned bronze to give East Germany its first medal in the event and the first medal for any German cyclist since 1952.

== Background ==
This was the 16th appearance of the event, which has been held at every Summer Olympics except in 1904 and 1912. Three quarterfinalists from 1972 returned: two-time gold medalist (and 1964 bronze medalist) Daniel Morelon of France and fifth-place finishers Niels Fredborg of Denmark and Jürgen Geschke of East Germany. Morelon had seven world championships to go with his two Olympic gold medals, and was again the favorite. Anton Tkáč of Czechoslavkia had won the 1974 world championship and was a contender as well.

Antigua and Barbuda and Yugoslavia each made their debut in the men's sprint; East Germany competed separately for the first time. France made its 16th appearance, the only nation to have competed at every appearance of the event.

== Competition format ==
This sprint competition involved a series of head-to-head matches. The 1976 competition featured a smaller field than previous Games, reducing the number of rounds from ten to eight by eliminating the second round and second repechage. The 1976 sprint involved eight rounds: five main rounds (first round, 1/8 finals, quarterfinals, semifinals, and finals) as well as two repechages after the first two main rounds; the second repechage was a two-round repechage.

- First round: The 25 entrants were divided into 12 heats of 2 cyclists each (except the final heat, which had 3). The winner of each heat advanced directly to the 1/8 finals (12 cyclists), while all other cyclists who competed were sent to the first repechage (13 cyclists).
- First repechage: The 13 cyclists were divided into 6 heats, each with 2 cyclists (again, except the final heat, which had 3). The winner of each heat advanced to the 1/8 finals (6 cyclists), while all others were eliminated (7 cyclists).
- 1/8 finals: The 18 cyclists who advanced through the first rounds (including repechage) competed in a 1/8 finals round. There were 6 heats in this round, with 3 cyclists in each. The top cyclist in each heat advanced to the quarterfinals (6 cyclists), while the other 2 in each heat went to the second repechage (12 cyclists).
- Second repechage: This was a two-round repechage. The repechage began with 4 heats of 3 cyclists each. The top cyclist in each heat advanced to the second round, while the other 2 cyclists in each heat were eliminated. The second round of this repechage featured 2 heats of 2 cyclists each, with the winners advancing to the quarterfinals and the losers eliminated.
- Quarterfinals: Beginning with the quarterfinals, all matches were one-on-one competitions and were held in best-of-three format. There were 4 quarterfinals, with the winner of each advancing to the semifinals and the loser going to the fifth-eighth classification race.
- Semifinals: The two semifinals provided for advancement to the gold medal final for winners and to the bronze medal final for losers.
- Finals: Both a gold medal final and a bronze medal final were held, as well as (for the first time) a classification final for fifth through eighth places for quarterfinal losers.

== Records ==
The records for the sprint are 200 metre flying time trial records, kept for the qualifying round in later Games as well as for the finish of races.

World record	Omar Pkhakadze (URS)	10.61	Mexico City, Mexico	22 October 1967
Olympic record	Leijn Loevesijn (NED)	10.66	Mexico City, Mexico	18 October 1968

No new world or Olympic records were set during the competition.

== Schedule ==
All times are Eastern Daylight Time (UTC-4)

Date	Time	Round
Wednesday, 21 July 1976	16:00; 16:40	Round 1 First repechage
Thursday, 22 July 1976	15:20; 16:15; 16:45; 17:00	1/8 finals Second repechage semifinals Second repechage finals Quarterfinals
Friday, 23 July 1976	16:30	Semifinals
Saturday, 24 July 1976	15:15	Finals

== Results ==
=== First round ===
==== First round heat 1 ====
Rank	Cyclist	Nation	Time	Notes
1	Daniel Morelon	France	11.46	Q
2	Taworn Tarwan	Thailand	–	R

==== First round heat 2 ====
Rank	Cyclist	Nation	Time	Notes
1	Giorgio Rossi	Italy	11.36	Q
2	Mikhail Kountras	Greece	–	R

==== First round heat 3 ====
Rank	Cyclist	Nation	Time	Notes
1	Jürgen Geschke	East Germany	11.55	Q
2	Vlado Fumić	Yugoslavia	–	R

==== First round heat 4 ====
Rank	Cyclist	Nation	Time	Notes
1	Benedykt Kocot	Poland	11.79	Q
2	Leslie Rawlins	Trinidad and Tobago	–	R

==== First round heat 5 ====
Rank	Cyclist	Nation	Time	Notes
1	Anton Tkáč	Czechoslovakia	11.19	Q
2	Stanley Smith	Barbados	–	R

==== First round heat 6 ====
Rank	Cyclist	Nation	Time	Notes
1	Sergey Kravtsov	Soviet Union	11.16	Q
2	Julio Echevarry	Colombia	–	R

==== First round heat 7 ====
Rank	Cyclist	Nation	Time	Notes
1	Gordon Singleton	Canada	11.44	Q
2	Dimo Angelov Tonchev	Bulgaria	–	R

==== First round heat 8 ====
Rank	Cyclist	Nation	Time	Notes
1	Yoshikazu Cho	Japan	11.21	Q
2	Niels Fredborg	Denmark	–	R

==== First round heat 9 ====
Rank	Cyclist	Nation	Time	Notes
1	Dieter Berkmann	West Germany	11.38	Q
2	Ron Boyle	Australia	–	R

==== First round heat 10 ====
Rank	Cyclist	Nation	Time	Notes
1	Richard Tormen	Chile	11.63	Q
2	Sjaak Pieters	Netherlands	–	R

==== First round heat 11 ====
Rank	Cyclist	Nation	Time	Notes
1	Xavier Mirander	Jamaica	11.45	Q
2	Trevor Gadd	Great Britain	–	R

==== First round heat 12 ====
Rank	Cyclist	Nation	Time	Notes
1	Michel Vaarten	Belgium	11.26	Q
2	Leigh Barczewski	United States	–	R
3	Patrick Spencer	Antigua and Barbuda	–	R

=== First repechage ===
==== First repechage heat 1 ====
Rank	Cyclist	Nation	Time	Notes
1	Stanley Smith	Barbados	12.34	Q
2	Taworn Tarwan	Thailand	–	

==== First repechage heat 2 ====
Rank	Cyclist	Nation	Time	Notes
1	Dimo Angelov Tonchev	Bulgaria	11.50	Q
2	Mikhail Kountras	Thailand	–	

==== First repechage heat 3 ====
Rank	Cyclist	Nation	Time	Notes
1	Julio Echevarry	Colombia	–	Q
2	Leslie Rawlins	Trinidad and Tobago	DSQ	

==== First repechage heat 4 ====
Rank	Cyclist	Nation	Time	Notes
1	Niels Fredborg	Denmark	11.96	Q
2	Ron Boyle	Australia	–	

==== First repechage heat 5 ====
Rank	Cyclist	Nation	Time	Notes
1	Trevor Gadd	Great Britain	–	Q
2	Leigh Barczewski	United States	DSQ	

==== First repechage heat 6 ====
Rank	Cyclist	Nation	Time	Notes
1	Sjaak Pieters	Netherlands	11.71	Q
2	Vlado Fumić	Yugoslavia	–	
3	Patrick Spencer	Antigua and Barbuda	–	

=== 1/8 finals ===
==== 1/8 final 1 ====
Rank	Cyclist	Nation	Time	Notes
1	Daniel Morelon	France	11.29	Q
2	Michel Vaarten	Belgium	–	R
3	Stanley Smith	Barbados	–	R

==== 1/8 final 2 ====
Rank	Cyclist	Nation	Time	Notes
1	Giorgio Rossi	Italy	11.39	Q
2	Richard Tormen	Chile	–	R
3	Dimo Angelov Tonchev	Bulgaria	–	R

==== 1/8 final 3 ====
Rank	Cyclist	Nation	Time	Notes
1	Jürgen Geschke	East Germany	11.52	Q
2	Xavier Mirander	Jamaica	–	R
3	Julio Echevarry	Colombia	–	R

==== 1/8 final 4 ====
Rank	Cyclist	Nation	Time	Notes
1	Niels Fredborg	Denmark	11.59	Q
2	Dieter Berkmann	West Germany	–	R
3	Benedykt Kocot	Poland	–	R

==== 1/8 final 5 ====
Rank	Cyclist	Nation	Time	Notes
1	Anton Tkáč	Czechoslovakia	11.69	Q
2	Gordon Singleton	Canada	–	R
3	Trevor Gadd	Great Britain	–	R

==== 1/8 final 6 ====
Rank	Cyclist	Nation	Time	Notes
1	Yoshikazu Cho	Japan	11.28	Q
2	Sergey Kravtsov	Soviet Union	–	R
3	Sjaak Pieters	Netherlands	–	R

=== Second repechage heats ===
==== Second repechage heat 1 ====
Rank	Cyclist	Nation	Time	Notes
1	Michel Vaarten	Belgium	12.61	Q
2	Julio Echevarry	Colombia	–	
3	Dimo Angelov Tonchev	Bulgaria	–	

==== Second repechage heat 2 ====
Rank	Cyclist	Nation	Time	Notes
1	Richard Tormen	Chile	11.75	Q
2	Benedykt Kocot	Poland	–	
3	Stanley Smith	Barbados	–	

==== Second repechage heat 3 ====
Rank	Cyclist	Nation	Time	Notes
1	Sergey Kravtsov	Soviet Union	11.31	Q
2	Trevor Gadd	Great Britain	–	
3	Xavier Mirander	Jamaica	–	

==== Second repechage heat 4 ====
Rank	Cyclist	Nation	Time	Notes
1	Dieter Berkmann	West Germany	11.43	Q
2	Sjaak Pieters	Netherlands	–	
3	Gordon Singleton	Canada	–	

=== Second repechage finals ===
==== Second repechage final 1 ====
Rank	Cyclist	Nation	Time	Notes
1	Dieter Berkmann	West Germany	11.67	Q
2	Richard Tormen	Chile	–	

==== Second repechage final 2 ====
Rank	Cyclist	Nation	Time	Notes
1	Sergey Kravtsov	Soviet Union	11.39	Q
2	Michel Vaarten	Belgium	–	

=== Quarterfinals ===
==== Quarterfinal 1 ====
Rank	Cyclist	Nation	Race 1		Race 2		Race 3		Notes
Rank	Cyclist	Nation	Rank	Time	Rank	Time	Rank	Time	Notes
1	Daniel Morelon	France	11.69	1	11.15	1	—		Q
2	Sergey Kravtsov	Soviet Union	–	2	–	2	—		C

==== Quarterfinal 2 ====
Rank	Cyclist	Nation	Race 1		Race 2		Race 3		Notes
Rank	Cyclist	Nation	Rank	Time	Rank	Time	Rank	Time	Notes
1	Dieter Berkmann	West Germany	–	2	11.96	1	11.80	1	Q
2	Giorgio Rossi	Italy	12.44	1	–	2	–	2	C

==== Quarterfinal 3 ====
Rank	Cyclist	Nation	Race 1		Race 2		Race 3		Notes
Rank	Cyclist	Nation	Rank	Time	Rank	Time	Rank	Time	Notes
1	Jürgen Geschke	East Germany	12.14	1	12.44	1	—		Q
2	Yoshikazu Cho	Japan	–	2	–	2	—		C

==== Quarterfinal 4 ====
Rank	Cyclist	Nation	Race 1		Race 2		Race 3		Notes
Rank	Cyclist	Nation	Rank	Time	Rank	Time	Rank	Time	Notes
1	Anton Tkáč	Czechoslovakia	11.53	1	11.69	1	—		Q
2	Niels Fredborg	Denmark	–	2	–	2	—		C

=== Semifinals ===
==== Semifinal 1 ====
Rank	Cyclist	Nation	Race 1		Race 2		Race 3		Notes
Rank	Cyclist	Nation	Rank	Time	Rank	Time	Rank	Time	Notes
1	Daniel Morelon	France	11.42	1	11.62	1	—		Q
2	Dieter Berkmann	West Germany	–	2	–	2	—		B

==== Semifinal 2 ====
Rank	Cyclist	Nation	Race 1		Race 2		Race 3		Notes
Rank	Cyclist	Nation	Rank	Time	Rank	Time	Rank	Time	Notes
1	Anton Tkáč	Czechoslovakia	11.24	1	–	2	11.13	1	Q
2	Jürgen Geschke	East Germany	–	2	11.65	1	–	2	B

=== Finals ===
==== Classification 5–8 ====
Rank	Cyclist	Nation	Time
5	Sergey Kravtsov	Soviet Union	Unknown
6	Yoshikazu Cho	Japan	–
7	Niels Fredborg	Denmark	–
8	Giorgio Rossi	Italy	–

==== Bronze medal match ====
Rank	Cyclist	Nation	Race 1		Race 2		Race 3	
Rank	Cyclist	Nation	Rank	Time	Rank	Time	Rank	Time
3rd place, bronze medalist(s)	Jürgen Geschke	East Germany	11.35	1	DSQ	2	11.42	1
4	Dieter Berkmann	West Germany	–	2	–	1	–	2

==== Final ====
Rank	Cyclist	Nation	Race 1		Race 2		Race 3	
Rank	Cyclist	Nation	Rank	Time	Rank	Time	Rank	Time
1st place, gold medalist(s)	Anton Tkáč	Czechoslovakia	10.78	1	–	2	11.17	1
2nd place, silver medalist(s)	Daniel Morelon	France	–	2	11.58	1	–	2

== Final classification ==
Rank	Cyclist	Nation
1st place, gold medalist(s)	Anton Tkáč	Czechoslovakia
2nd place, silver medalist(s)	Daniel Morelon	France
3rd place, bronze medalist(s)	Jürgen Geschke	East Germany
4	Dieter Berkmann	West Germany
5	Sergey Kravtsov	Soviet Union
6	Yoshikazu Cho	Japan
7	Niels Fredborg	Denmark
8	Giorgio Rossi	Italy
9	Richard Tormen	Chile
9	Michel Vaarten	Belgium
11	Julio Echevarry	Colombia
11	Trevor Gadd	Great Britain
11	Benedykt Kocot	Poland
11	Sjaak Pieters	Netherlands
15	Dimo Angelov Tonchev	Bulgaria
15	Xavier Mirander	Jamaica
15	Gordon Singleton	Canada
15	Stanley Smith	Barbados
19	Leigh Barczewski	United States
19	Ron Boyle	Australia
19	Vlado Fumić	Yugoslavia
19	Mikhail Kountras	Greece
19	Leslie Rawlins	Trinidad and Tobago
19	Taworn Tarwan	Thailand
25	Patrick Spencer	Antigua and Barbuda
