= Cycling at the 1976 Summer Olympics – Men's individual pursuit =

Men's cycling individual pursuit at the Games of the XXI Olympiad
- Venue: Montreal, Quebec, Canada
- Date: 20–22 July 1976
- Competitors: 27 from 27 nations

Medalists
1st place, gold medalist(s)		Gregor Braun	West Germany
2nd place, silver medalist(s)		Herman Ponsteen	Netherlands
3rd place, bronze medalist(s)		Thomas Huschke	East Germany

These are the results of the men's individual pursuit at the 1976 Summer Olympics in Montreal, Quebec, Canada, held from 20 to 22 July 1976. There were a total number of 27 participants in the Olympic Vélodrome.

== Competition format ==
The individual pursuit competition consisted of a qualifying round and a 4-round knockout tournament (increased from three rounds in previous Games), including a bronze medal race. Each race, in both the qualifying round and the knock-out rounds, consisted of a pair of cyclists starting from opposite sides of the track. The cyclists raced for 4,000 metres, attempting to finish with the fastest time and, if possible, catch the other cyclist. For the qualifying round, the 16 fastest times overall (regardless of whether the cyclist finished first or second in his heat, though any cyclist who was overtaken was eliminated) earned advancement to the knockout rounds. In the knockout rounds, the winner of each heat advanced to the next round.

== Results ==
=== Qualifying round ===
Rank	Cyclist	Nation	Time	Notes
1	Vladimir Osokin	Soviet Union	4:48.31	Q
2	Thomas Huschke	East Germany	4:48.75	Q
3	Herman Ponsteen	Netherlands	4:49.51	Q
4	Gregor Braun	West Germany	4:50.00	Q
5	Orfeo Pizzoferrato	Italy	4:50.44	Q
6	Gary Sutton	Australia	4:50.57	Q
7	Jan Jankiewicz	Poland	4:51.48	Q
8	Jan Georg Iversen	Norway	4:51.86	Q
9	Mike Richards	New Zealand	4:55.08	Q
10	Michal Klasa	Czechoslovakia	4:56.42	Q
11	Jean-Louis Baugnies	Belgium	4:56.86	Q
12	Harry Hannus	Finland	4:57.11	Q
13	Robert Dill-Bundi	Switzerland	4:58.76	Q
14	Yoichi Machishima	Japan	4:59.20	Q
15	Jean-Jacques Rebière	France	5:00.32	Q
16	Gábor Szűcs	Hungary	5:00.39	Q
17	Raúl Marcelo Vázquez	Cuba	5:00.45	
18	Fernando Vera	Chile	5:00.68	
19	Leonard Nitz	United States	5:01.54	
20	Ian Hallam	Great Britain	5:02.47	
21	Washington Díaz	Uruguay	5:03.00	
22	Bojan Ropret	Yugoslavia	5:06.32	
23	Erol Küçükbakırcı	Turkey	5:11.84	
24	Tang Kam Man	Hong Kong	5:47.24	
–	José Jaime Galeano	Colombia	Overtaken	
–	Gholam Hossein Koohi	Iran	Overtaken	
–	Donald Christian	Antigua and Barbuda	DNF	
–	Elmabruk Kehel	Lebanon	DNS	

=== 1/8 finals ===
==== 1/8 final 1 ====
Rank	Cyclist	Nation	Time	Notes
1	Jan Georg Iversen	Norway	4:52.82	Q
2	Mike Richards	New Zealand	4:53.33	

==== 1/8 final 2 ====
Rank	Cyclist	Nation	Time	Notes
1	Michal Klasa	Czechoslovakia	4:49.84	Q
2	Jan Jankiewicz	Poland	4:54.94	

==== 1/8 final 3 ====
Rank	Cyclist	Nation	Time	Notes
1	Gary Sutton	Australia	4:51.36	Q
2	Jean-Louis Baugnies	Belgium	4:57.53	

==== 1/8 final 4 ====
Rank	Cyclist	Nation	Time	Notes
1	Orfeo Pizzoferrato	Italy	4:48.41	Q
2	Harry Hannus	Finland	Overtaken	

==== 1/8 final 5 ====
Rank	Cyclist	Nation	Time	Notes
1	Gregor Braun	West Germany	4:46.94	Q
2	Robert Dill-Bundi	Switzerland	Overtaken	

==== 1/8 final 6 ====
Rank	Cyclist	Nation	Time	Notes
1	Herman Ponsteen	Netherlands	4:47.18	Q
2	Yoichi Machishima	Japan	Overtaken	

==== 1/8 final 7 ====
Rank	Cyclist	Nation	Time	Notes
1	Thomas Huschke	East Germany	4:47.72	Q
2	Jean-Jacques Rebière	France	4:57.37	

==== 1/8 final 8 ====
Rank	Cyclist	Nation	Time	Notes
1	Vladimir Osokin	Soviet Union	4:45.10	Q
2	Gábor Szűcs	Hungary	Overtaken	

=== Quarterfinals ===
==== Quarterfinal 1 ====
Rank	Cyclist	Nation	Time	Notes
1	Thomas Huschke	East Germany	4:47.44	Q
2	Orfeo Pizzoferrato	Italy	4:47.89	

==== Quarterfinal 2 ====
Rank	Cyclist	Nation	Time	Notes
1	Herman Ponsteen	Netherlands	4:48.67	Q
2	Michal Klasa	Czechoslovakia	4:49.61	

==== Quarterfinal 3 ====
Rank	Cyclist	Nation	Time	Notes
1	Gregor Braun	West Germany	4:48.67	Q
2	Gary Sutton	Australia	4:49.61	

==== Quarterfinal 4 ====
Rank	Cyclist	Nation	Time	Notes
1	Vladimir Osokin	Soviet Union	4:48.27	Q
2	Jan Georg Iversen	Norway	4:51.04	

=== Semifinals ===
==== Semifinal 1 ====
Rank	Cyclist	Nation	Time	Notes
1	Gregor Braun	West Germany	4:45.50	Q
2	Vladimir Osokin	Soviet Union	4:45.67	B

==== Semifinal 2 ====
Rank	Cyclist	Nation	Time	Notes
1	Herman Ponsteen	Netherlands	4:52.43	Q
2	Thomas Huschke	East Germany	4:59.42	B

=== Finals ===
==== Bronze medal match ====
Rank	Cyclist	Nation	Time
3rd place, bronze medalist(s)	Thomas Huschke	East Germany	4:52.71
4	Vladimir Osokin	Soviet Union	4:57.34

==== Final ====
Rank	Cyclist	Nation	Time
1st place, gold medalist(s)	Gregor Braun	West Germany	4:47.61
2nd place, silver medalist(s)	Herman Ponsteen	Netherlands	4:49.72

== Final classification ==
RANK	FINAL RANKING
	Gregor Braun (FRG)
	Herman Ponsteen (NED)
	Thomas Huschke (GDR)
4.	Vladimir Osokin (URS)
5.	Orfeo Pizzoferrato (ITA)
6.	Gary Sutton (AUS)
7.	Jan Georg Iversen (NOR)
8.	Michal Klasa (TCH)
9.	Mike Richards (NZL)
10.	Jan Jankiewicz (POL)
11.	Jean-Jacques Rebière (FRA)
12.	Jean-Louis Baugnies (BEL)
13.	Harry Hannus (FIN)
14.	Robert Dill-Bundi (SUI)
15.	Yoichi Machishima (JPN)
16.	Gábor Szűcs (HUN)
17.	Raúl Marcelo Vázquez (CUB)
18.	Fernando Vera (CHI)
19.	Leonard Nitz (USA)
20.	Ian Hallam (GBR)
21.	Washington Díaz (URU)
22.	Bojan Ropret (YUG)
23.	Erol Küçükbakırcı (TUR)
24.	Tang Kam Man (HKG)
25.	Donald Christian (ANT)
26.	José Jaime Galeano (COL)
27.	Gholam Hossein Koohi (IRI)
