= Cycling at the 1976 Summer Olympics – Men's track time trial =

Men's track time trial events at the Olympics

Men's track time trial at the Games of the XXI Olympiad
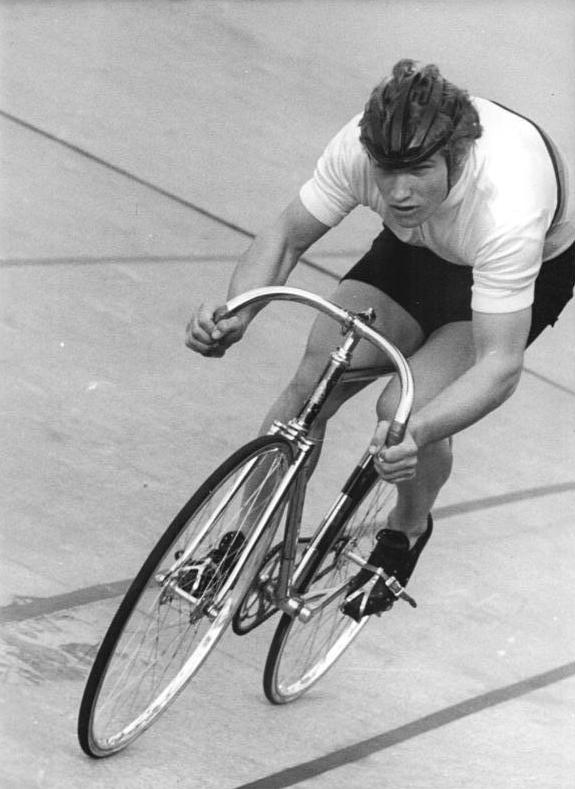
- Klaus-Jürgen Grünke
- Venue: Montreal, Canada
- Date: 20 July 1976
- Competitors: 31 from 31 nations
- Winning time: 1:05.927

Medalists
1st place, gold medalist(s)		Klaus-Jürgen Grünke	East Germany
2nd place, silver medalist(s)		Michel Vaarten	Belgium
3rd place, bronze medalist(s)		Niels Fredborg	Denmark

The men's track time trial at the 1976 Summer Olympics in Montreal, Canada, was held on July 20, 1976. There were 30 participants from 30 nations, with each nation limited to one cyclist. One additional cyclist, Elmabruk Kehel from Libya, was entered but did not start because of the last-minute boycott from the African countries. The event was won by Klaus-Jürgen Grünke of East Germany, the nation's first victory in the men's track time trial. Michel Vaarten of Belgium took silver. Niels Fredborg became the only man to win three medals in the event, adding a bronze to his 1968 silver and 1972 gold.

== Background ==
This was the 12th appearance of the event, which had previously been held in 1896 and every Games since 1928. It would be held every Games until being dropped from the programme after 2004. The returning cyclists from 1972 were gold medalist (and 1968 silver medalist) Niels Fredborg of Denmark, fifth-place finisher (and 1968 bronze medalist) Janusz Kierzkowski of Poland, sixth-place finisher Dimo Angelov Tonchev of Bulgaria, eighth-place finisher Eduard Rapp of the Soviet Union, fifteenth-place finisher Jocelyn Lovell of Canada, eighteenth-place finisher Harald Bundli of Norway, and non-finisher Hector Edwards of Barbados. Fredborg, Rapp (1974 world champion), and Klaus-Jürgen Grünke (1975 world champion) were favored.

Antigua and Barbuda, Bolivia, Hong Kong, and Yugoslavia each made their debut in the men's track time trial. France and Great Britain each made their 12th appearance, having competed at every appearance of the event.

== Competition format ==
The event was a time trial on the track, with each cyclist competing separately to attempt to achieve the fastest time. Each cyclist raced one kilometre from a standing start.

== Records ==
The following were the world and Olympic records prior to the competition.

World record	Pierre Trentin (FRA)	1:03.91	Mexico City, Mexico	17 October 1968
Olympic record	Pierre Trentin (FRA)	1:03.91	Mexico City, Mexico	17 October 1968

No new world or Olympic records were set during the competition.

== Schedule ==
All times are Eastern Daylight Time (UTC-4)

Date	Time	Round
Tuesday, 20 July 1976	15:00	Final

== Results ==
Rank	Cyclist	Nation	Time	Speed (km/h)
1st place, gold medalist(s)	Klaus-Jürgen Grünke	East Germany	1:05.927	54.606
2nd place, silver medalist(s)	Michel Vaarten	Belgium	1:07.516	53.321
3rd place, bronze medalist(s)	Niels Fredborg	Denmark	1:07.617	53.241
4	Janusz Kierzkowski	Poland	1:07.660	53.207
5	Eric Vermeulen	France	1:07.846	53.061
6	Hans Michalsky	West Germany	1:07.878	53.036
7	Harald Bundli	Norway	1:08.093	52.869
8	Walter Bäni	Switzerland	1:08.112	52.854
9	Miroslav Vymazal	Czechoslovakia	1:08.173	52.807
10	Massimo Marino	Italy	1:08.488	52.564
11	David Weller	Jamaica	1:08.534	52.529
12	Stephen Goodall	Australia	1:08.610	52.470
13	Jocelyn Lovell	Canada	1:08.852	52.286
14	Dimo Angelov Tonchev	Bulgaria	1:08.950	52.212
15	Robert Vehe	United States	1:09.057	52.131
16	Richard Tormen	Chile	1:09.468	51.822
17	Yoshikazu Cho	Japan	1:09.664	51.677
18	Hector Edwards	Barbados	1:10.084	51.367
19	Paul Medhurst	Great Britain	1:10.167	51.306
20	Anthony Sellier	Trinidad and Tobago	1:11.103	50.631
21	Mikhail Kountras	Greece	1:11.435	50.395
22	Miguel Margalef	Uruguay	1:11.905	50.066
23	Erol Küçükbakırcı	Turkey	1:12.697	49.521
24	Vlado Fumić	Yugoslavia	1:13.037	49.290
25	Masoud Mobaraki	Iran	1:14.169	48.538
26	Marco Soria	Bolivia	1:14.480	48.335
27	Taworn Tarwan	Thailand	1:15.136	47.913
28	Chan Fai Lui	Hong Kong	1:16.957	46.779
—	Donald Christian	Antigua and Barbuda	DNF	—
—	Eduard Rapp	Soviet Union	DSQ	—
—	Elmabruk Kehel	Libya	DNS	—
