= Jamie Richards =

Jamie Richards may refer to:

- Jamie Richards (footballer)
- Jamie Richards (horse trainer)
- Jamie Richards (cyclist)
- Jamie Richards (translator)

== See also ==
- James Richards (disambiguation)
