= Howard Davis Jr. =

American boxer (1956–2015)

Howard Davis
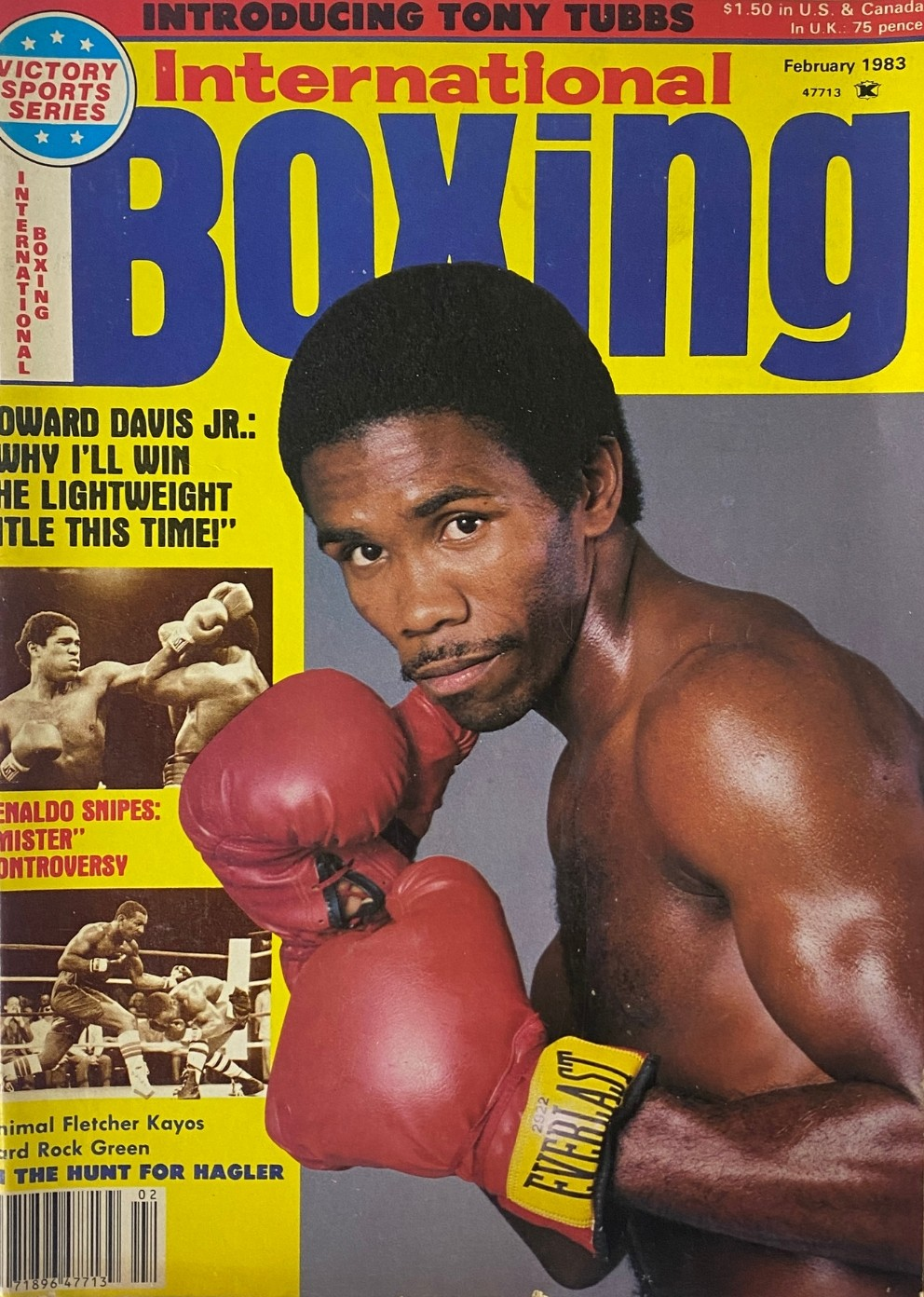
- Davis on the cover of an issue of International Boxing magazine, cover dated February 1983

Personal information
- Full name: Howard Edward Davis Jr.
- Born: February 14, 1956 Glen Cove, New York, U.S.
- Died: December 30, 2015 (aged 59) Plantation, Florida, U.S.
- Height: 1.77 m (5 ft 10 in)
- Weight: 60 kg (132 lb)

Sport
- Sport: Boxing
- Weight class: Lightweight and Featherweight
Medal record
Men's boxing
Representing the United States
Olympic Games
Gold medal – first place	1976 Montreal	Lightweight
World Amateur Championships
Gold medal – first place	1974 Havana	Featherweight

Howard Edward Davis Jr. (February 14, 1956 – December 30, 2015) was an American professional boxer. Growing up on Long Island as the eldest of 10 children, Davis first learned boxing from his father. After being inspired by a movie about Muhammad Ali, Davis embarked on his amateur career. He won the 1976 Olympic gold medal one week after his mother died. He was also awarded the Val Barker Trophy at the Olympics, beating out such boxers as Sugar Ray Leonard, Michael Spinks and Leon Spinks.

He turned professional after the Olympics and went on to compile a professional record of 36–6–1 with 14 knockouts. He retired in 1996. After retirement he became a trainer. Eventually he worked as boxing director at American Top Team in Coconut Creek, Florida, where he trained both amateur and professional boxers and MMA fighters. He was also a motivational speaker and a musician.

== Amateur career ==
As an amateur, Davis was trained by his father, a former boxer. He had an outstanding amateur career. In 1976, Davis won the Olympic gold medal in the lightweight division in Montreal, Quebec, Canada.

Davis was also named the Outstanding Boxer of the 1976 Olympics and given the Val Barker Trophy. His Olympic teammates included Sugar Ray Leonard, Michael Spinks and Leon Spinks.

His Olympic victory came just one week after his mother died of a heart attack.

Davis had an amateur record of 125–5.

Amateur accomplishments include:

- 1973 National AAU Champion (125 lb)
  - Defeated Leroy Veasley of Detroit in the final
- 1974 World Championships (125 lbs) in Havana, Cuba
  - Defeated Roberto Andino (Puerto Rico) on points
  - Defeated Rumen Peshev (Bulgaria) on points
  - Defeated Eddie Ndukwu (Nigeria) on points
  - Defeated Mariano Álvarez (Cuba) on points
  - Defeated Boris Kuznetsov (Soviet Union) on points
- 1976 National AAU Champion (132 lbs)
  - Defeated Thomas Hearns on points.
- 1976 Olympic Trials
  - Defeated Aaron Pryor to qualify at 132 pounds
- 1976 Summer Olympics – Gold Medal (132 lbs) and Val Barker Award winner for Most Outstanding Boxer of the Games
  - Round of 32: Defeated Yukio Segawa (Japan) won on points
  - Round of 16: Defeated Leonidas Asprilla (Colombia) won by KO 2
  - Quarterfinal:; Defeated Tsvetan Tsvetkov (Bulgaria) won by TKO 3
  - Semifinal: Defeated Ace Rusevski (Yugoslavia) won on points
  - Final: Defeated Simion Cuţov (Romania) won on points

== Professional career ==
Davis turned professional in 1977. After winning his first thirteen fights, he challenged Jim Watt for the WBC lightweight title in 1980. Watt won by a fifteen-round unanimous decision. In 1984, with a record of 26–1, Davis fought Edwin Rosario for the WBC lightweight title. Rosario retained his title with a twelve-round split decision. His final attempt to win a world title came in 1988. Davis was stunningly knocked out in the first round by IBF junior welterweight champion Buddy McGirt. He retired after the fight. In 1994, Davis launched a comeback as a middleweight. He retired for good after losing by second-round knockout to Dana Rosenblatt on April 13, 1996.

He finished with a professional record of 36–6–1 with 14 KO's.

== Honors ==
In August 1976, Davis' hometown of Glen Cove, New York honored Davis with a parade for his Olympic achievement, which was attended by Lt. Governor Mary Anne Krupsak.

In July 2009, Glen Cove honored Davis by naming a street after him. The Mayor also proclaimed July 10 as Howard Davis Day in honor of both father and son.

== Personal life ==
In 1981, Davis had his Olympic Gold Medal stolen from his home, only to be found years later by a landscaper on the side of the road. After discovering the true value of the medal, the landscaper returned the medal to Davis.

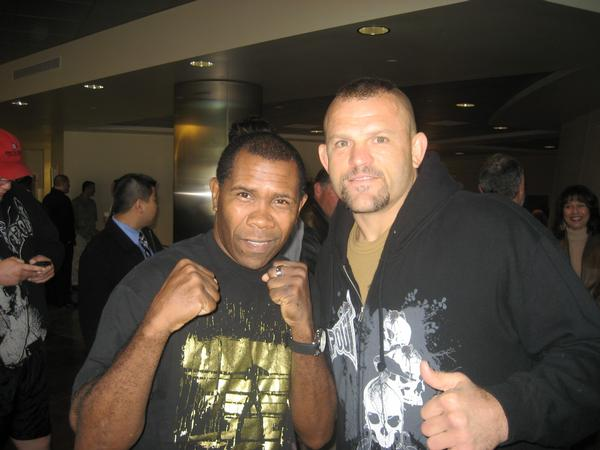
Davis with Chuck Liddell, 2009

Davis served as a boxing trainer to MMA fighters, including Chuck Liddell and fighters from American Top Team. He also worked as a sports commentator, a public speaker, and a promoter for Fight Time Promotions. Davis was a boxing coach/trainer for Chuck Liddell on The Ultimate Fighter 11. Davis' wife Karla Guadamuz-Davis served as his Publicist and Business Manager.

Davis followed a strict vegetarian diet.

Davis' son Dyah is also a former professional boxer, who transitioned to a coaching career and is a boxing coach at the American Top Team.

== Death ==
In the summer of 2015 Davis learned that he had incurable, late-stage lung cancer. He died on December 30, 2015, from the disease at the age of 59.

== Professional boxing record ==
43 fights	36 wins	6 losses
By knockout	14	2
By decision	22	4
Draws	1	

No.	Result	Record	Opponent	Type	Round, time	Date	Location	Notes
43	Loss	36–6–1	(United States) Dana Rosenblatt	KO	2 (12), 2:00	13 Apr 1996	(United States) TD Garden, Boston, Massachusetts, US	For the WBU Middleweight Championship.
42	Win	36–5–1	(Costa Rica) Humberto Aranda	PTS	10	29 Jun 1995	(United States) Ukrainian Cultural Center, Somerset, New Jersey, US	
41	Win	35–5–1	(United States) Glenn Odem	UD	10	4 May 1995	(United States) Ukrainian Cultural Center, Somerset, New Jersey, US	
40	Win	34–5–1	(Dominican Republic) Joaquin Velasquez	UD	10	19 Jan 1995	(United States) Ukrainian Cultural Center, Somerset, New Jersey, US	
39	Win	33–5–1	(United States) Rip Rettig	TKO	7 (10)	17 Nov 1994	(United States) Ukrainian Cultural Center, Somerset, New Jersey, US	
38	Loss	32–5–1	(United States) Buddy McGirt	KO	1 (15), 2:45	31 Jul 1988	(United States) Felt Forum, New York, New York, US	For the IBF Super Lightweight Championship.
37	Win	32–4–1	(United States) Ron Johnson	UD	10	28 Apr 1988	(United States) Teachers Union Hall, Dorchester, Boston, US	
36	Win	31–4–1	(United States) Shelton LeBlanc	UD	10	25 Mar 1988	(United States) Felt Forum, New York, New York, US	
35	Win	30–4–1	(United States) Ali Kareem Muhammad	TKO	9 (10), 2:15	21 Jan 1988	(United States) Felt Forum, New York, New York, US	
34	Loss	29–4–1	(Puerto Rico) Héctor Camacho	UD	10	2 May 1987	(United States) Convention Center, Atlantic City, New Jersey, US	
33	Win	29–3–1	(United States) Othal Dixon	UD	10	27 Feb 1987	(United States) Trump Casino Hotel, Atlantic City, New Jersey, US	
32	Draw	28–3–1	(United States) Meldrick Taylor	SD	10	16 Aug 1986	(United States) Sands Hotel Casino, Atlantic City, New Jersey, US	
31	Loss	28–3	(United States) Joe Manley	UD	10	28 Feb 1986	(United States) Golden Nugget Casino, Atlantic City, New Jersey, US	
30	Win	28–2	(United States) Sammy Matos	TKO	4 (10)	16 Oct 1985	(United States) New Brunswick High School, New Brunswick, New Jersey, US	
29	Win	27–2	(United States) Bobby Johnson	UD	10	14 Dec 1984	(United States) Nassau Coliseum, Uniondale, New York, US	
28	Loss	26–2	(Puerto Rico) Edwin Rosario	SD	12	23 Jun 1984	Roberto Clemente Coliseum, San Juan, Puerto Rico	For the WBC Lightweight Championship.
27	Win	26–1	(United States) Darrell Stovall	TKO	2 (10), 1:48	16 May 1984	(United States) Showboat Hotel & Casino, Las Vegas, Nevada, US	
26	Win	25–1	(United States) Connie Swift	RTD	8 (10), 3:00	3 Mar 1984	(United States) Bally's Park Place Hotel Casino, Atlantic City, New Jersey, US	
25	Win	24–1	(United States) Greg Coverson	TKO	8 (10), 2:36	18 Jun 1983	(United States) Resorts Casino Hotel, Atlantic City, New Jersey, US	
24	Win	23–1	(United Kingdom) George Feeney	UD	10	10 Apr 1983	Sanremo, Italy	
23	Win	22–1	(United States) Tony Baltazar	UD	10	27 Feb 1983	(United States) Resorts Casino Hotel, Atlantic City, New Jersey, US	
22	Win	21–1	(Trinidad and Tobago) Claude Noel	UD	10	12 Nov 1982	(United States) Orange Bowl, Miami, Florida, US	
21	Win	20–1	(Dominican Republic) Ezequiel Cocoa Sanchez	UD	10	16 Oct 1982	(United States) Golden Nugget Casino, Atlantic City, New Jersey, US	
20	Win	19–1	(United States) James Martinez	TKO	6 (10)	26 Aug 1982	(United States) Sands Hotel Casino, Atlantic City, New Jersey, US	
19	Win	18–1	(United States) Anthony Collins	RTD	3 (10)	22 Jul 1982	(United States) Sands Hotel Casino, Atlantic City, New Jersey, US	
18	Win	17–1	(Dominican Republic) Julio Valdez	UD	10	3 Jun 1982	(United States) Sands Casino Hotel, Atlantic City, New Jersey, US	
17	Win	16–1	(United States) Angel Cruz	UD	10	16 Apr 1981	(United States) Felt Forum, New York, New York, US	
16	Win	15–1	(United States) Larry Stanton	RTD	8 (10), 3:00	26 Jun 1981	(United States) Colonie Hill Catering Hall, Hauppauge, New York, US	
15	Win	14–1	(United States) Johnny Lira	UD	10	6 Dec 1980	(United States) Caesars Tahoe, Stateline, Nevada, US	
14	Loss	13–1	(United Kingdom) Jim Watt	UD	15	7 Jun 1980	(United Kingdom) Ibrox Park, Glasgow, Scotland, UK	For the WBC Lightweight Championship.
13	Win	13–0	(Dominican Republic) Vilomar Fernandez	UD	12	23 Feb 1980	(United States) Resorts Casino Hotel, Atlantic City, New Jersey, US	
12	Win	12–0	(United States) Maurice Watkins	UD	10	14 Sep 1979	(United States) The Summit, Houston, Texas, US	
11	Win	11–0	(Mexico) Jose Hernandez	KO	7 (10), 2:50	17 Jun 1979	(United States) Convention Center Arena, San Antonio, Texas, US	
10	Win	10–0	(Italy) Giancarlo Usai	KO	3 (10), 0:28	20 Apr 1979	(United States) Felt Forum, New York, New York, US	
9	Win	9–0	(Puerto Rico) Luis Davila	UD	10	4 Nov 1978	(United States) Resorts International Hotel & Casino, Superstar Theatr, Atlantic City, New Jersey, US	
8	Win	8–0	(United States) Norman Goins	UD	10	9 Jul 1978	(United States) Indiana Convention Center, Indianapolis, Indiana, US	
7	Win	7–0	(United States) Larry Stanton	SD	10	13 May 1978	(United States) Orlando Sports Stadium, Orlando, Florida, US	
6	Win	6–0	(Dominican Republic) Jose Fernandez	UD	8	4 Feb 1978	(United States) Aladdin Theater, Las Vegas, Nevada, US	
5	Win	5–0	(Mexico) Arturo Pineda	TKO	4 (8)	13 Sep 1977	(United States) Grand Olympic Auditorium, Los Angeles, California, US	
4	Win	4–0	(Italy) Domenick Monaco	TKO	8 (8), 2:17	17 Jul 1977	(United States) Miami Beach Convention Center, Miami Beach, Florida, US	
3	Win	3–0	(United States) Carlos Rico Gonzalez	UD	6	11 May 1977	(United States) Madison Square Garden, New York, New York, US	
2	Win	2–0	(United States) Rick Craney	KO	3 (6), 1:35	20 Mar 1977	(United States) Kentucky Exposition Center, Louisville, Kentucky, US	
1	Win	1–0	(Puerto Rico) Jose Resto	UD	6	15 Jan 1977	(United States) The Aladdin, Las Vegas, Nevada, US	Professional debut
