= James Richards =

James Richards may refer to:

- James Richards (artist) (born 1983), British artist
- James Richards (Canadian football) (born 1969), American football offensive guard
- James Richards (cricketer) (1855–1923), English cricketer
- James Richards (politician) (1723–1810), Revolutionary War Captain and Connecticut state representative
- James Richards (veterinarian) (1948–2007), American veterinarian and noted expert on cats
- James Richards, pen name of the creator of Everyday Chemistry
- James A. D. Richards (1845–1911), United States Representative from Ohio
- James Maude Richards (1907–1992), British architectural writer
- James P. Richards (1894–1979), United States Representative from South Carolina
- James William Richards (1850–1915), Canadian politician
- James Edwin Richards (1945–2000), American journalist, editor and publisher
- James Lorin Richards (1858–1955), American financier and industrialist
- James Richard (1928–2002), sound editor, sometimes as James A. Richards
- Jimmy Richards (born 1975), Welsh rugby player
- Jamie Richards (cyclist) (born 1957), cyclist from New Zealand
- Jamie Richards (footballer) (born 1994), English footballer
- Jamie Richards (horse trainer) New Zealand thoroughbred racehorse trainer

== See also ==
- Jim Richards (disambiguation)
- Richard James (disambiguation)
