= Cuțov =

Cuțov is a Romanian surname. Notable people with the surname include:

- Calistrat Cuțov (1948–2025), Romanian boxer, brother of Simion
- Simion Cuțov (1952–1993), Romanian boxer
