= Solomin =

Solomin (Russian: Соломин) or Solomina (Russian: Соломина; feminine) is a common Russian surname. Notable people with the surname include:

- Aleksandr Solomin (born 1980), Russian ethnologist and genealogist
- Anatoliy Solomin (born 1952), Soviet and Ukrainian race walker
- Illya Solomin (born 1998), Swedish figure skater
- Nikolay Solomin (1834–1882), Russian icon painter
- Pavel Solomin (born 1982), Uzbekistani footballer
- Pyotr Solomin (1839–1871), Russian poet and educationist
- Valeriy Solomin (1938–2017), Soviet and Russian film director
- Vassily Solomin (1953–1997), Soviet and Russian boxer
- Vitaly Solomin (1941–2002), Soviet and Russian actor, brother of Yury Solomin
- Yury Solomin (1935–2024), Soviet and Russian actor, brother of Vitaly Solomin

== See also ==
- 10054 Solomin, main-belt asteroid named after Yuri Solomin
