= Patrick Spencer =

Patrick or Pat Spencer may refer to:

- Patrick Spencer (cyclist) (fl. 1976), Antiguan cyclist
- Patrick Spencer (politician) (born 1988), British politician
- Pat Spencer (born 1996), American basketball and collegiate lacrosse player
- Pat Spencer (General Hospital), fictional character in the TV series General Hospital

== See also ==
- Patricia Spencer (1953–?), American teenager who disappeared in 1969; see Disappearance of Patricia Spencer and Pamela Hobley
