= Ernesto González =

Ernesto González can refer to:

- Ernesto González (boxer) (born 1957), a Nicaraguan boxer
- Ernesto Gonzalez (judge) (born 1962), an American federal judge
- Ernesto Gonzalez (politician) (born 1956), Cuban-born American politician
