= Gaetano Pirastu =

Italian boxer

Personal information
- Nationality: Italian
- Born: 22 July 1955 (age 69); Oristano, Italy

Sport
- Sport: Boxing

Gaetano Pirastu (born 22 July 1955) is an Italian boxer. He competed in the men's lightweight event at the 1976 Summer Olympics. He lost in the opening round to Roberto Andino of Puerto Rico.
