= Greece at the 1976 Summer Olympics =

- IOC code: GRE
- NOC: Committee of the Olympic Games

in Montreal Canada
- Competitors: 36 (34 men and 2 women) in 8 sports
- Flag bearer: Vasilios Papageorgopoulos
- Medals: Gold 0 Silver 0 Bronze 0 Total 0

Summer Olympics appearances (overview)
- 1896; 1900; 1904; 1908; 1912; 1920; 1924; 1928; 1932; 1936; 1948; 1952; 1956; 1960; 1964; 1968; 1972; 1976; 1980; 1984; 1988; 1992; 1996; 2000; 2004; 2008; 2012; 2016; 2020; 2024

Other related appearances
- 1906 Intercalated Games

Greece competed at the 1976 Summer Olympics in Montreal, Quebec, Canada. 36 competitors, 34 men and 2 women, took part in 34 events in 8 sports. Greek athletes have competed in every Summer Olympic Games. Greece did not win any Olympic medals at the 1976 Olympic Games.

== Athletics ==
Men's 100 meters

- Michail Kousis

- Heat – did not start (→ did not advance)

Men's 110m hurdles

- Stratos Vasileiou

- Heats (→ did not advance)

Men's 400m hurdles

- Stavros Tziortzis

- Heats – 50.42s
- Semi final – 50.30s: 10th (→ did not advance)

- George Parris

- Heats – 51.91s
- Semi final – did not finish (→ did not advance)

Men's long jump

- Pana Hatzistathis

- Qualification – 7.33m (→ did not advance)

Men's marathon

- Michail Kousis – 2:21:42 (→ 29th place)

Women's long jump

- Maroula Lambrou-Teloni

- Qualification – 6.13m

== Cycling ==
One cyclist represented Greece in 1976.

Individual road race

- Mikhail Kountras – did not finish (→ no ranking)

Sprint

- Mikhail Kountras – 22nd place

1000m time trial

- Mikhail Kountras – 1:11.435 (→ 21st place)
