= Julio Echevarry =

Colombian cyclist

Personal information
- Born: October 19, 1957 (age 68) Colombia

Cycling career
- Sport: Cycling
- Discipline: Track
- Role: Rider
- Rider type: Sprinter

Major wins
- Competed in sprint at the 1976 Summer Olympics

Julio Echevarry (born 19 October 1957) is a Colombian former cyclist. He competed in the sprint event at the 1976 Summer Olympics.
