= Sokolniki Stare =

- Village
- Location within Poland
- Coordinates: 52°40′38″N 20°17′16″E
- Country: Poland
- Voivodeship: Masovian
- County: Płońsk
- Gmina: Baboszewo

Sokolniki Stare [sɔkɔlˈniki ˈstarɛ] is a village in the administrative district of Gmina Baboszewo, within Płońsk County, Masovian Voivodeship, in east-central Poland.

== Notable people ==
- Bogdan Gajda, Polish boxer
