= Jan Georg Iversen =

Norwegian cyclist

Personal information
- Born: 2 March 1956 (age 70) Oslo, Norway

Cycling career
- Sport: Cycling

Jan Georg Iversen (born 2 March 1956) is a Norwegian cyclist. He was born in Oslo. He competed at the 1976 Summer Olympics in Montreal, where he placed seventh in the 4000 meter individual pursuit.
