= Richard James =

Richard James may refer to:

- Richard T. James (1918–1974), American naval engineer, inventor of the Slinky
- Richard D. James (production designer) (1936–2024), American art director and production designer
- Richard D. James (Musician), better known as Aphex Twin or Caustic Window
- Richard D. James (scientist) (born 1952), American mechanician and materials scientist at the University of Minnesota
- Richard James (Oklahoma politician) (1926–2013), American politician
- Richard James (aviator) (1911–1989), set the junior transcontinental air speed record in 1928
- Richard James (musician) (born 1975), Welsh musician
- Richard James (scholar) (1592–1638), British man of letters
- Richard James (sprinter, born 1956), Australian sprinter
- Richard James (sprinter, born 1979), Jamaican sprinter
- Richard James (pagan), founder of Odyssean Wicca
- Richard James (tailor), British tailor and menswear company
- Richard T. James (politician) (1910–1965), Lieutenant Governor of Indiana
- Richard James Simpson (born 1967), American musician, formerly Richard James
- Richard James (murderer) (1957–1975), Singaporean and one of the robbers cum murderers of the Gold Bars triple murders
- Richard James, Actor who appeared in Space Precinct

== See also ==
- James Richards (disambiguation)
- Rick James (1948–2004), American musician
- Dick James (1920–1986), British music publisher
- Dick James (American football) (1934–2000), American football halfback and defensive back
- Richard James Edwards (1967–1995), lyricist and guitarist of Manic Street Preachers
