= Ace Rusevski =

Macedonian boxer (born 1956)

Personal information
- Born: November 30, 1956 (age 69) Kumanovo, SFR Yugoslavia (present-day North Macedonia)
Medal record
Men's boxing
Olympic Games
Bronze medal – third place	1976 Montreal	Lightweight
European Amateur Championships
Gold medal – first place	1977 Halle	Lightweight
Mediterranean Games
Gold medal – first place	1979 Split	Light Welterweight

Ace Rusevski (born November 30, 1956, in Kumanovo) is a retired Macedonian boxer who represented Yugoslavia at the 1976 Summer Olympics in Montreal, Quebec, Canada. There he won the bronze medal in the lightweight division (– 60 kg) after being defeated in the semifinals by eventual gold medalist Howard Davis Jr. of the United States.

== Professional career ==
Rusevski turned pro in 1981. He retired in 1987 with a career record of 18-2-3 with 8 KO's.

== Amateur career ==
- 1977 - European Championships, Halle, Germany: Gold Medal (Lightweight)
- 1978 - World Championships, Belgrade, Yugoslavia: (Lightweight)

Defeated Jouko Moilanen (Finland) RSC 2
Lost to Davidson Andeh (Nigeria) RSCI 2

- 1979 - Mediterranean Games, Split, Yugoslavia: Gold medal (Light-welterweight)

=== Olympics results ===
- 1976 - Olympic Games, Montreal, Canada: Bronze Medal (Lightweight)
  - Round of 64: Defeated Gerard Hamill (Ireland) by decision, 4–1
  - Round of 32: Defeated Roberto Andino (Puerto Rico) RSC 3
  - Round of 16: Defeated Reinaldo Valiente (Cuba) by decision, 5–0
  - Quarterfinal: Defeated Yves Jeudy (Haiti) RSC 2
  - Semifinal: Lost to Howard Davis, Jr. (United States) by decision, 0-5 (was awarded bronze medal)
- 1980 - Olympic Games, Moscow, Soviet Union: (Light-welterweight)
  - Defeated Margarit Anastasov (Bulgaria) 4–1
  - Defeated Boualem Bel Alouane (Algeria) 5–0
  - Lost to Patrizio Oliva (Italy) 2-3
