= Robert Vehe =

American cyclist

Personal information
- Born: August 20, 1953 (age 73) Chicago, Illinois, United States

Cycling career
- Sport: Cycling

Robert Vehe (born August 20, 1953) is an American former cyclist. He competed in the 1000m time trial event at the 1976 Summer Olympics.
