= Parviz Bahmani =

Iranian boxer

Personal information
- Nationality: Iranian
- Born: 5 May 1956 (age 68)

Sport
- Sport: Boxing

Parviz Bahmani (Persian: پرویز بهمنی; born 5 May 1956) is an Iranian boxer. He competed in the men's lightweight event at the 1976 Summer Olympics.
