= Walter Bäni =

Swiss cyclist

Personal information
- Born: 17 February 1957 (age 69)

Cycling career
- Sport: Cycling

Walter Bäni (born 17 February 1957) is a Swiss former cyclist. He competed in the 1000m time trial event at the 1976 Summer Olympics.
