= Stanley Smith (cyclist) =

Barbadian cyclist

Personal information
- Born: 20 August 1952 (age 74)

Cycling career
- Sport: Cycling

Stanley Smith (born 20 August 1952) is a Barbadian former cyclist. He competed in the sprint event at the 1976 Summer Olympics.
