= Klaus-Jürgen Grünke =

East German cyclist

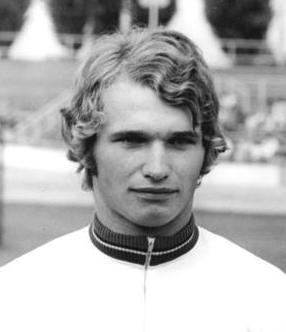
- Klaus-Jürgen Grünke.

Personal information
- Born: 30 March 1951 (age 75) Bad Lauchstädt, East Germany

Cycling career
- Sport: Cycling
Medal record
Men's track cycling
Representing East Germany
Olympic Games
Gold medal – first place	1976 Montreal	1.000m Time Trial

Klaus-Jürgen Grünke (born 30 March 1951) is a retired track cyclist from East Germany, who represented his native country at the 1976 Summer Olympics in Montreal, Canada. There he won the gold medal in the men's 1,000m time trial, defeating Belgium's Michel Vaarten. A year earlier he won the world title in the same event in Rocourt.
