= Sylvester Mittee =

Saint Lucian/British boxer

Personal information
- Nickname: The Master Blaster
- Nationality: Saint Lucian
- Born: Sylvester Mittee; 29 October 1956 (age 69) Saint Lucia/British
- Height: 5 ft 7 in (1.70 m)
- Weight: light/light welter/welter/light middleweight

Boxing career

Boxing record
- Total fights: 33
- Wins: 28 (KO 22)
- Losses: 5 (KO 3)

Sylvester "The Master Blaster" Mittee (born 29 October 1956) is a Saint Lucian-British boxer of the 1970s and 1980s. He fought as an amateur lightweight and a professional light welterweight/welterweight/light middleweight, winning multiple championships.

== Boxing career ==
As an amateur, Mittee won the 1973 Amateur Boxing Association of England (ABAE) Junior Class-B title, while boxing for Crown and Manor ABC, Hoxton, London. He subsequently won the 1976 ABAE lightweight title against Thomas McCallum (Sparta BC) while boxing for Repton Amateur Boxing Club, Bethnal Green, London.

Mittee represented Great Britain at the 1976 Summer Olympics in Montreal, Quebec, Canada, competing as a lightweight in the boxing events. After a bye in the round of 64, his sole fight was a loss to Simion Cuţov of Romania, the eventual silver medalist, in the round of 32; the referee stopped the contest in the third round.

As a professional, Mittee won the British Boxing Board of Control (BBBofC) Southern (England) Area light welterweight title, the BBofC British welterweight title and Commonwealth welterweight title, and was a challenger for the BBBofC British light welterweight title against Clinton McKenzie, and European Boxing Union (EBU) welterweight title against Lloyd Honeyghan. His professional fighting weight varied from 139 lb (63 kg; 9 st 13 lb), or light welterweight, to 151 1/2 lb (68.7 kg; 10 st 11.5 lb), or light middleweight.
