= Yoichi Machishima =

Japanese cyclist

Personal information
- Born: 23 December 1954 (age 71) Kagamiishi, Japan

Cycling career
- Sport: Cycling

Yoichi Machishima (町島 洋一, Machishima Yōichi; born 23 December 1954) is a Japanese former cyclist. He competed in the individual and team pursuit events at the 1976 Summer Olympics and 1974 Asian Games. He was mostly known in Japan as a professional keirin cyclist.
