= Leigh Barczewski =

American cyclist

Personal information
- Born: December 25, 1955 (age 70) Milwaukee, Wisconsin, United States

Cycling career
- Sport: Cycling

Leigh Barczewski (born December 25, 1955) is an American former cyclist. He competed in the sprint event at the 1976 Summer Olympics.
