= Éric Vermeulen =

French cyclist

Personal information
- Born: 12 April 1954 (age 72) Saint-Quentin-de-Baron, France

Cycling career
- Sport: Cycling

Éric Vermeulen (born 12 April 1954) is a French former cyclist. He competed in the 1000m time trial event at the 1976 Summer Olympics.
