= Yukio Segawa =

Japanese boxer

Personal information
- Born: 瀬川幸雄; 9 September 1954 (age 71) Aomori, Japan
- Height: 5 ft 6 in (168 cm)

Boxing career
- Weight class: Super bantamweight
- Stance: Southpaw

Boxing record
- Total fights: 13
- Wins: 10
- Win by KO: 7
- Losses: 3

Yukio Segawa (瀬川 幸雄, Segawa Yukio; born 9 September 1954) is a Japanese former boxer. He competed in the men's lightweight event at the 1976 Summer Olympics. At the 1976 Summer Olympics, he lost to Howard Davis Jr. of the United States, who would go on to win the tournament.

== Professional career ==
Cardona made his professional debut on January 22, 1977, knocking out Yoshio Tano in the first round. He challenged once for a world title, losing a 15 round decision to Ricardo Cardona for Cardona's WBA super bantamweight crown. While he was active he trained with Teiken Boxing Gym.

== Professional boxing record ==
13 fights	10 wins	3 losses
By knockout	7	1
By decision	3	2

No.	Result	Record	Opponent	Type	Round, time	Date	Location	Notes
13	Loss	10–3	Yu Kasahara	PTS	10	2 Oct 1980	Korakuen Hall, Tokyo, Japan	
12	Win	10–2	Kenzo Takasugi	UD	10	26 Apr 1980	Hachinohe, Japan	
11	Win	9–2	Larry Enriquez	PTS	10	28 Nov 1979	Japan	
10	Loss	8–2	Ricardo Cardona	UD	15	6 Sep 1979	City Gymnasium, Hachinohe, Japan	For WBA super-bantamweight title
9	Win	8–1	Ely Barrios	KO	2 (10)	21 May 1979	Korakuen Hall, Tokyo, Japan	
8	Win	7–1	Keo Sung Lee	TKO	7 (10)	30 Mar 1979	Japan	
7	Win	6–1	Somkiat Sukhothai	KO	8 (10), 2:54	28 Dec 1978	Japan	
6	Win	5–1	Sandy Noora	UD	10	26 Oct 1978	Japan	
5	Win	4–1	Mangkorndam Muangsurin	KO	9 (10)	24 Aug 1978	Japan	
4	Loss	3–1	Koji Kunishige	KO	10 (10)	6 Jun 1978	Japan	
3	Win	3–0	Tadashi Yatsuzuka	KO	5 (?)	27 Mar 1978	Japan	
2	Win	2–0	Hajime Momozaki	KO	3 (?)	23 Feb 1978	Japan	
1	Win	1–0	Yoshio Tano	KO	1 (6)	22 Dec 1977	Japan	
