= Herman Ponsteen =

Dutch cyclist (born 1953)

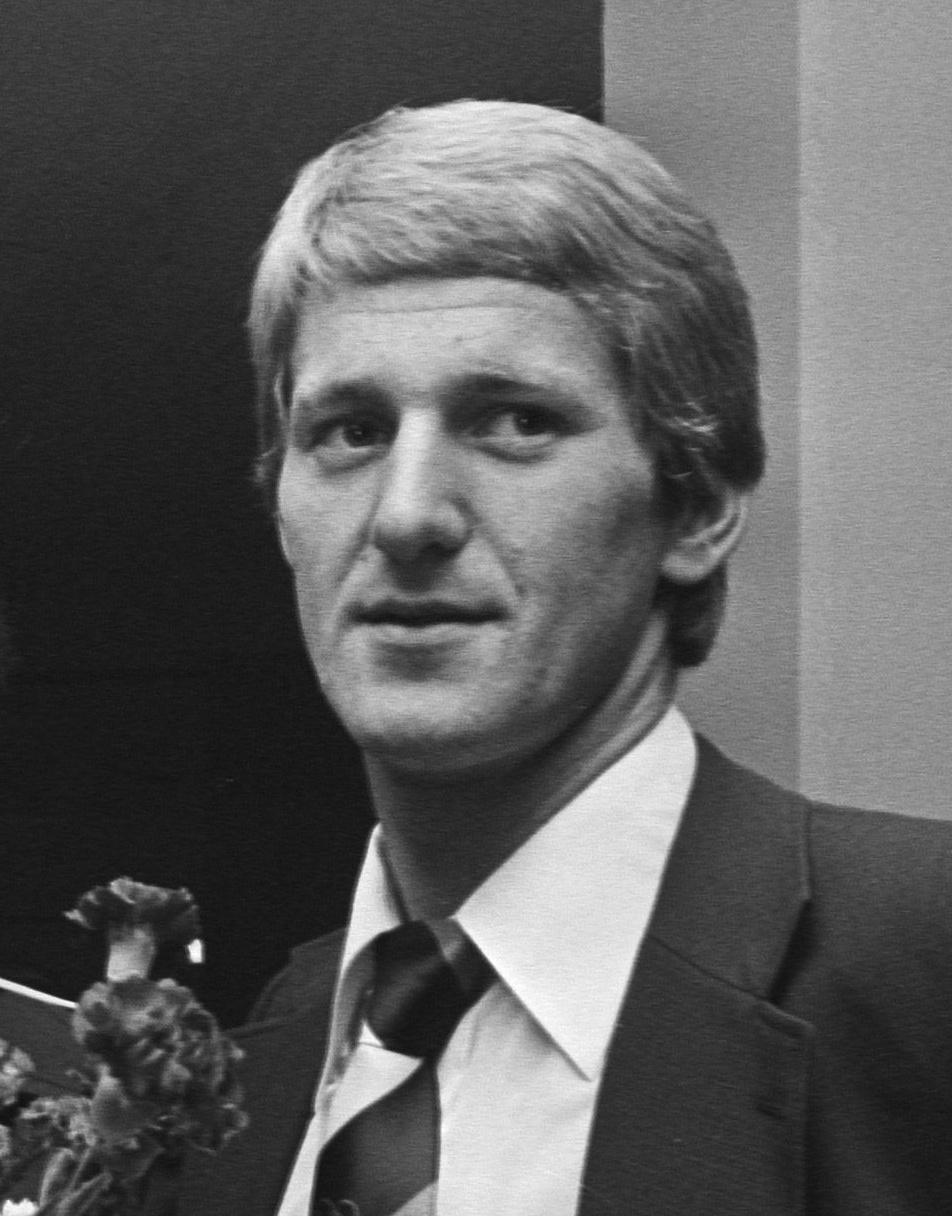
- Herman Ponsteen in 1976

Personal information
- Full name: Herman Ponsteen
- Born: 27 March 1953 (age 73) Hellendoorn, the Netherlands

Cycling career
- Sport: Cycling
- Discipline: Track
- Role: Rider
Medal record
Representing the Netherlands
Men's track cycling
Olympic Games
Silver medal – second place	1976 Montreal	4.000m Individual Pursuit

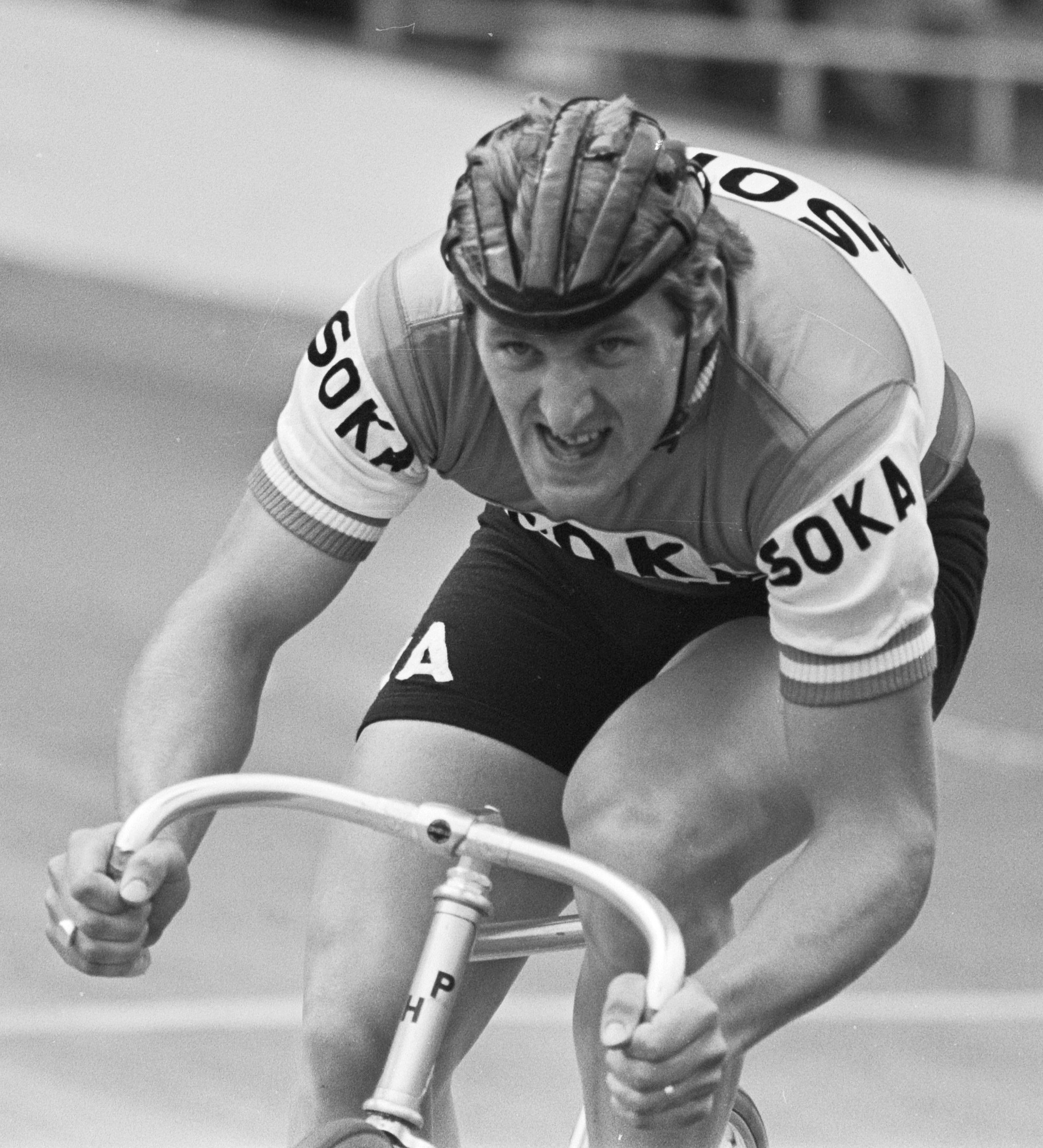
Herman Ponsteen, 1977

Herman Ponsteen (born 27 March 1953 in Hellendoorn, Overijssel) is a retired track cyclist from the Netherlands. He represented his native country at two Summer Olympics, at the 1972 Summer Olympics in Munich, West Germany and 1976 Summer Olympics in Montreal, Canada.

At the 1976 Summer Olympics, he won the silver medal in the men's 4,000m Individual Pursuit.

== Major results ==
=== Road ===
1977
1st Stage 8 Olympia's Tour

=== Track ===
1976
2nd Individual pursuit, Olympic Games

== See also ==
- List of Dutch Olympic cyclists
