= Hans Michalsky =

German cyclist (1949–2022)

Personal information
- Born: 9 May 1949 Neuss, Germany
- Died: 16 October 2022 (aged 73) Erkrath, Germany

Cycling career
- Sport: Cycling

Hans Michalsky (9 May 1949 – 16 October 2022) was a German cyclist. He competed in the 1000m time trial event at the 1976 Summer Olympics.

== Career ==
Hans Michalsky was one of the most successful amateur cyclists in Germany in the 1970s; he started on the track and road. He became German champion in the 1000 meter time trial five times. In 1975 he came third in the German road racing championship and second in 1977. In 1976 he won the Tour de Berlin.

In 1976, Michalsky competed in the 1000-meter time trial at the Olympic Games in Montreal and finished sixth. He started for PSV Cologne.

During his career as a cyclist, Hans Michalsky became a professional soldier and also a three-time military cycling world champion. In 1982 he opened a bicycle shop in Erkrath. He was the older brother of Rudi Michalsky, who was also a cyclist.
