= Paul Fennell =

British cyclist

Personal information
- Nationality: England
- Born: Kent
Medal record
Cycling
Representing England
Commonwealth Games
Bronze medal – third place	1978 Edmonton	team pursuit

Paul Fennell is a male retired British cyclist.

== Cycling career ==
He represented England in the 10 miles scratch race, the 1 Km time trial and the 4,000 metres team pursuit, at the 1978 Commonwealth Games in Edmonton, Alberta, Canada and was part of the bronze medal pursuit winning team that consisted of Tony James, Tony Doyle and Glen Mitchell.

He won one National Championship in 1974.
