= Trevor Gadd =

English track cycling champion

Personal information
- Born: 16 April 1952 (age 74) Wolverhampton, England

Sport
- Sport: Cycling
Medal record
Cycling
Representing England
Commonwealth Games
Silver medal – second place	1978 Edmonton	tandem
Silver medal – second place	1978 Edmonton	match sprint

Trevor John Gadd (born 1952) is a retired English track cycling champion who represented Great Britain and England.

== Cycling career ==
=== Olympic Games ===
Gadd represented Great Britain at the 1976 Summer Olympics where he finished in 12th place in the men's sprint.

=== Commonwealth Games ===
He represented England and won two silver medals in the tandem and the 1,000 metres match sprint, at the 1978 Commonwealth Games in Edmonton, Alberta, Canada.

=== World Championships ===
He competed in the 1977 UCI Track Cycling World Championships in Venezuela.

=== National Championships ===
Gadd won six British National Track Championships; three in 1977 and three in 1978.

=== Other ===
- 1977 British White Hope winner, Herne Hill, London, 5th in the 1 km time trial.
- 1978 European Indoor Championships East Berlin, 2nd in sprint.
- 1978 Winner, Champion of Champions Sprint event in Herne Hill, London (first British rider to win in 20 years).
- 1987 Canadian National Championships; sprint silver and 1.000 metres time trial.
