= Orfeo Pizzoferrato =

Italian cyclist

Personal information
- Born: 19 January 1951 (age 75) Pescina, Italy

Cycling career
- Sport: Cycling

Orfeo Pizzoferrato (born 19 January 1951) is an Italian former cyclist. He competed in the individual pursuit event at the 1976 Summer Olympics.
