= Tony James (cyclist) =

British cyclist

Personal information
- Nationality: England
- Born: 24 January 1955 (age 71) Westminster
Medal record
Cycling
Representing England
Commonwealth Games
Bronze medal – third place	1978 Edmonton	team pursuit

Anthony 'Tony' Alan James (born 1955) is a male retired British cyclist.

== Cycling career ==
He represented England in the 4,000 metres team pursuit, at the 1978 Commonwealth Games in Edmonton, Alberta, Canada, the team went on to win a bronze medal and consisted of Paul Fennell, Tony Doyle and Glen Mitchell.

He won two British National Track Championships in 1979 and 1980 and was a professional rider from 1980 until 1988. He also won the British National Omnium Championships in 1985.
