= Jean-Louis Baugnies =

Belgian cyclist

Personal information
- Born: 17 June 1957 (age 69) Obourg, Belgium

Cycling career
- Sport: Cycling

Jean-Louis Baugnies (born 17 June 1957) is a Belgian former cyclist. He competed in the individual event at the 1976 Summer Olympics.
