= Masoud Mobaraki =

Iranian cyclist

Personal information
- Born: 31 May 1953 (age 73)

Cycling career
- Sport: Cycling

Masoud Mobaraki (Persian: مسعود مبارکی; born 31 May 1953) is an Iranian former cyclist. He competed in the 1000m time trial event at the 1976 Summer Olympics.
