= Jim Richards =

Jim Richards may refer to:

- Jim Richards (basketball) (1936–2026), American college basketball coach
- Jim Richards (American football) (1946–2022), American football player
- Jim Richards (broadcaster) (born 1966), Canadian radio broadcaster
- Jim Richards (racing driver) (born 1947), New Zealand and Australian race driver
- Jim Richards (rugby league) (1928–2007), Australian rugby league footballer
- Jim Richards, Alberta political candidate, see Calgary-McCall and Calgary-McKnight

== See also ==
- James Richards (disambiguation)
