= Richard Tormen =

Chilean cyclist

Personal information
- Born: 10 October 1951 (age 75)

Cycling career
- Sport: Cycling

Richard Tormen (born 10 October 1951) is a Chilean former cyclist. He competed in the sprint and 1000m time trial events at the 1976 Summer Olympics.
