= Kenrick Tucker =

Australian cyclist (born 1959)

Personal information
- Nickname: Rockhampton Rocket
- Born: 6 February 1959 (age 67) Rockhampton, Australia
- Height: 183 cm (6 ft 0 in)
- Weight: 90 kg (198 lb)

Cycling career
- Sport: Cycling
- Rider type: Sprint-kilo
Medal record
Representing AUS
Men's cycling
Commonwealth Games
Gold medal – first place	1978 Edmonton	Men's Sprint
Silver medal – second place	1978 Edmonton	Men's Time Trial
Gold medal – first place	1982 Brisbane	Men's Sprint

Kenrick Gregory Tucker OAM (born 6 February 1959) is an Australian former cyclist. He competed at the 1980 Summer Olympics and the 1984 Summer Olympics.

== Early life ==
Tucker attended Rockhampton State High School from 1972 to 1975.

== Career ==
Tucker won a gold medal and silver medal in the cycling events at the 1978 Commonwealth Games in Edmonton, Canada.

At the 1980 Olympic Games in Moscow, he participated in the sprint and 1,000 metres time trial events. Four years later at the 1984 Olympic Games in Los Angeles he took part in the sprint event.

== Major results ==
- 1981 Australian Sprint & Time Trial Champion
- 1981 World Championships – Sprint (1/4 Finals), 5th Time Trial
- 1981 Australian 20 km Champion
- 1982 Australian Sprint & Time Trial Champion
- 1982 Brisbane Commonwealth Games Sprint Champion
- 1984 Australian Sprint Champion
- 1984 Los Angeles Olympic Games – Sprint (1/4 Finals)
- 1985 Australian Sprint – 2nd
- 1986 Australian Sprint – 2nd
- 1994 World Masters Sprint Champion & Time Trial Champion
