= Reinaldo Valiente =

Cuban boxer

Personal information
- Nationality: Cuban
- Born: 13 July 1958 (age 66)

Sport
- Sport: Boxing

Reinaldo Valiente (born 13 July 1958) is a Cuban boxer. He competed in the men's lightweight event at the 1976 Summer Olympics. In his first fight, he beat Antonio Rubio of Spain, before being eliminated by Ace Rusevski of Yugoslavia.
