= Steve Goodall =

Australian cyclist (born 1956)

Personal information
- Born: 28 October 1956 (age 69) Bundaberg, Australia

Cycling career
- Sport: Cycling
- Discipline: Track
- Role: Rider
- Rider type: Tandem & Sprint
Medal record
Representing AUS
Men's cycling
Commonwealth Games
Bronze medal – third place	1978 Edmonton	Men's Tandem

Stephen James Goodall (born 28 October 1956) is an Australian racing cyclist, who won the 1978 Commonwealth Games Bronze Medal for the 1500 metres Tandem and placed 12th out of 30 competitors in the 1976 Summer Olympics 1000 metres Individual Time Trial.
