= Leonidas Asprilla =

Colombian male boxer

Personal information
- Nationality: Colombian
- Born: 31 July 1952 (age 73)

Sport
- Sport: Boxing

Leonidas Asprilla (born 31 July 1952) is a Colombian boxer. He competed in the men's lightweight event at the 1976 Summer Olympics.
