= Patrick Spencer (cyclist) =

Antiguan cyclist

Personal information
- Full name: Patrick Spencer

Cycling career
- Sport: Cycling

Patrick Spencer is a former Antiguan cyclist. He competed in the sprint event at the 1976 Summer Olympics.
