= Hans Henrik Palm =

Danish boxer

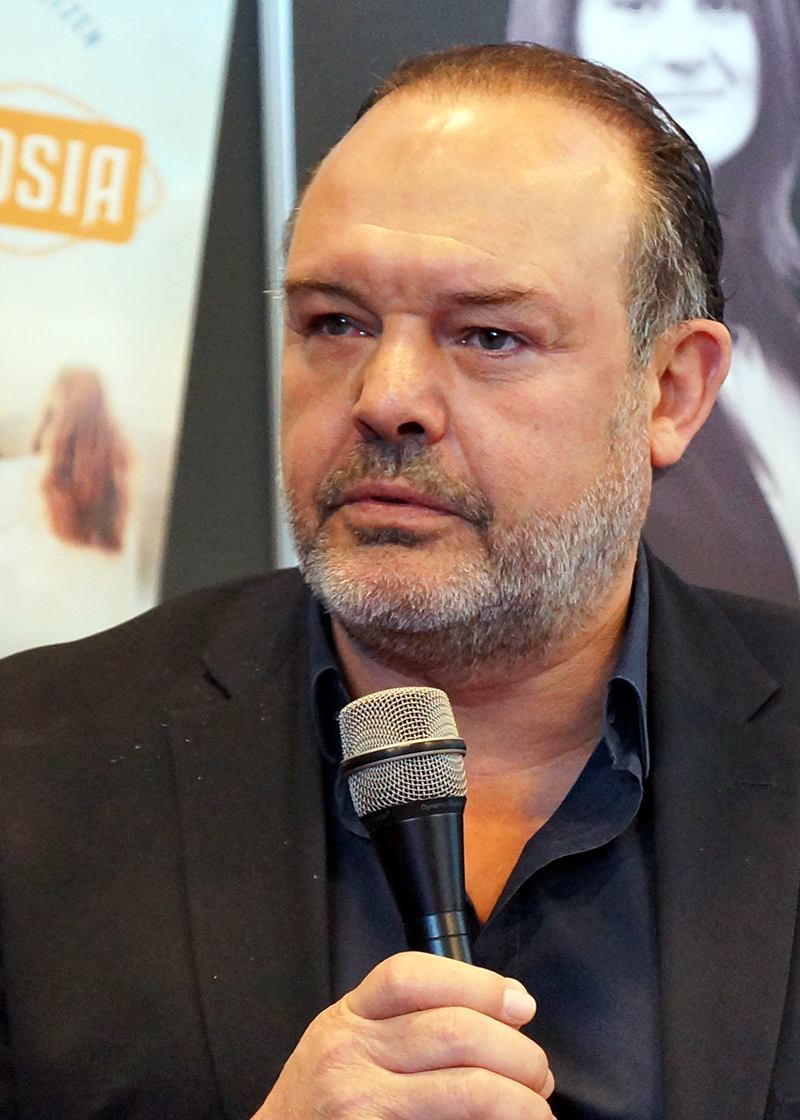

Personal information
- Nationality: Danish
- Born: Hans Henrik Palm; 19 July 1956 (age 70) Kgs. Lyngby, Denmark
- Weight: Welterweight

Boxing career
- Stance: Orthodox

Boxing record
- Total fights: 42
- Wins: 39
- Win by KO: 18
- Losses: 3
- Draws: 0
- No contests: 0

Hans Henrik Palm (born 19 July 1956) is a Danish retired boxer, who became European welterweight champion in 1982. Before turning professional he represented Denmark at the 1976 Summer Olympics in Montreal, Quebec, Canada where he dropped a decision to world champion Vassily Solomin of the USSR.

== Amateur career ==
As an amateur Hans Henrik Palm competed in the senior ranks at the age of 17 where he won the Danish national bantamweight title in 1974. In the following years he captured the Danish featherweight title (1975) and lightweight title (1976). He also became Nordic champion in 1976.

Palm competed at the 1976 Summer Olympics in Montreal, Quebec, Canada. In the first round of the tournament he was matched against the world lightweight champion Vassily Solomin of the USSR. Palm did fine against Solomin but dropped a close 0-5 decision.

Hans Henrik Palm made a record of 55-4 as an amateur.

== Professional career ==
In 1976 Palm turned professional. Based in Denmark he built a professional record against primarily European boxers, including wins over former European champions Lothar Abend, Jose Antonio Jiminez, Henry Rhiney and Joseph Pachler and the British champion Clinton McKenzie.

Having reached a record of 29-0 he was matched against European welterweight champion Jørgen Hansen in a rare match involving two Danes in a title bout. Palm entered the title bout as a favorite against the 37-year-old Hansen but lost by TKO in the ninth round on 17 October 1980. A rematch against Hansen for the European title on 9 October 1981 was lost by a close decision.

Palm got a third chance of capturing the European welterweight title when he was matched against French champion Georges Warusfel on 26 February 1982 for the title that Jørgen Hansen had vacated. Palm won the title by TKO in round 3 and defended the title against former Italian champion Pierangelo Pira later in 1982.

On 11 November 1982 he defended the title against Welsh contender Colin Jones but was stopped in two rounds. Hans Henrik Palm retired after the bout with a 39–3 record (18 KO's).

After the boxing career Palm worked as a trainer for Anders Eklund and the Bredahl-brothers Jimmi and Johnny. Palm became a successful businessman establishing a successful chain of fitness-centers and had success in the real estate market. However, the Great Recession put an end to the business enterprise and Palm declared personal bankruptcy in 2010.

Achievements
Preceded by Jørgen Hansen; Vacated	EBU Welterweight Champion; 26 February 1982 – 11 November 1982	Succeeded by Colin Jones
