= Georgios Agrimanakis =

Greek boxer (born 1949)

Personal information
- Nationality: Greek
- Born: 5 March 1949 (age 77) Athens, Greece
- Height: 1.73 m (5 ft 8 in)
- Weight: 64 kg (141 lb)

Sport
- Sport: Boxing
Medal record
Men's boxing
Representing Greece
Mediterranean Games
Bronze medal – third place	1975 Algiers	Light Welterweight

Georgios Agrimanakis (born 5 March 1949) is a Greek boxer. He competed in the 1976 Summer Olympics.

== 1976 Olympic results ==
Below is the record of Georgios Agrimanakis, a Greek lightweight boxer who competed at the 1976 Montreal Olympics:

- Round of 64: bye
- Round of 32: won by walkover versus Bechir Jilassi (Tunisia)
- Round of 16: lost to Andras Batos (Hungary) by decision, 1-4
