= Bogdan Gajda =

Polish boxer

Personal information
- Nationality: Polish
- Born: 26 August 1953 (age 72) Sokolniki Stare, Poland

Sport
- Sport: Boxing
Medal record
Men's amateur boxing
Representing Poland
European Championships
Gold medal – first place	1977 Halle	Middleweight

Bogdan Gajda (born 26 August 1953) is a Polish boxer. He competed at the 1976 Summer Olympics and the 1980 Summer Olympics. At the 1976 Summer Olympics, he lost to Vassily Solomin of the Soviet Union. At the 1980 Summer Olympics, he lost to Shadrach Odhiambo of Sweden.
