= Gábor Szűcs =

Hungarian cyclist

Personal information
- Born: 25 September 1956 (age 70) Budapest, Hungary

Cycling career
- Sport: Cycling

Gábor Szűcs (born 25 September 1956) is a Hungarian former cyclist. He competed at the 1976 Summer Olympics and the 1980 Summer Olympics.
