= Gerard Hamill =

Irish boxer (born 1955)

Personal information
- Nationality: Irish
- Born: 29 January 1955 (age 70)

Sport
- Sport: Boxing

Gerard Hamill (born 29 January 1955) is an Irish boxer. He competed in the men's lightweight event at the 1976 Summer Olympics. At the 1976 Summer Olympics, he lost to Ace Rusevski of Yugoslavia.
