= Nelson Calzadilla =

Venezuelan boxer (1954–2026)

Personal information
- Born: 1 June 1954 Cumaná, Sucre, Venezuela
- Died: 15 April 2026 (aged 71) Cumaná, Sucre, Venezuela
- Height: 167 cm (5 ft 6 in)
- Weight: 60 kg (132 lb)

Sport
- Country: Venezuela
- Sport: Boxing

Nelson Calzadilla (1 June 1954 – 15 April 2026) was a Venezuelan Olympic boxer. He represented his country in the lightweight division at the 1976 Summer Olympics. He won his first match against Ernesto Gonzalez. He lost his second match against Simion Cuțov. Calzadilla died on 15 April 2026, at the age of 71.

== 1976 Olympic results ==
- Round of 64: bye
- Round of 32: defeated Ernesto Gonzalez (Nicaragua) on points, 5-0
- Round of 16: lost to Simion Cutov (Romania) on points, 0-5
