= James Richards (cricketer) =

English cricketer

Personal information
- Full name: James Henry Richards
- Born: 3 January 1855; Brixton, Surrey, England
- Died: 24 August 1923 (aged 68); Tulse Hill, London, England
- Batting: Unknown
- Bowling: Unknown

Domestic team information
- Years: Team
- 1881: Surrey

Career statistics
Competition	First-class
Matches	2
Runs scored	9
Batting average	2.25
100s/50s	–/–
Top score	8
Balls bowled	180
Wickets	2
Bowling average	44.50
5 wickets in innings	–
10 wickets in match	–
Best bowling	2/40
Catches/stumpings	–/–
- Source: Cricinfo, 24 June 2012

James Henry Richards (3 January 1855 – 24 August 1923) was an English cricketer. Richards' batting and bowling styles are unknown. He was born at Brixton, Surrey.

Richards made two first-class appearances for Surrey in 1881, against Middlesex at Lord's, and Lancashire at Old Trafford. In his first match, Surrey won the toss and elected to bat first, making 157 all out, with Richards scoring a single run before he was dismissed by Augustus Ford. Middlesex responded in their first-innings by making 192 all out, with Richards taking the wickets of A. J. Webbe and Isaac Walker to finish with figures of 2/40 from 28 overs. Surrey then made just 79 all out in their second-innings, with Richards being dismissed by James Robertson for a duck. This left Middlesex requiring just 45 for victory, which they reached without losing any wickets. In his second match, Lancashire won the toss and elected to bat first, making 324 all out, with Richards bowling fourteen wicketless overs. Surrey responded in their first-innings by making just 69 all out, with Richards being dismissed for 8 runs by Alexander Watson. Forced to follow-on in their second-innings, Surrey were dismissed for 130, with Richards dismissed for a duck by Dick Barlow. Lancashire won the match by an innings and 125 runs.

He died at Tulse Hill, London, on 24 August 1923.
