= Ernesto González (boxer) =

Nicaraguan boxer

Personal information
- Nationality: Nicaraguan
- Born: 9 December 1957 (age 67)

Sport
- Sport: Boxing

Ernesto González (born 9 December 1957) is a Nicaraguan boxer. He competed in the men's lightweight event at the 1976 Summer Olympics. At the 1976 Summer Olympics, he lost to Nelson Calzadilla of Venezuela.
