= Antonio Rubio =

Spanish boxer

Personal information
- Full name: Antonio Rubio Fernández
- Nationality: Spanish
- Born: 30 August 1949 Bullas

Sport
- Sport: Boxing
Medal record
Men's boxing
Representing Spain
European Amateur Boxing Championships
Bronze medal – third place	1975 Katowice	Featherweight

Antonio Rubio Fernández (born August 20, 1949) is a retired boxer from Spain, who twice represented his native country during the 1970s at the Summer Olympics. He reached the quarterfinals in 1972 (Munich). Four years later in Montreal, Quebec, Canada, Rubio was stopped in his first bout in the second round of the lightweight division (– 60 kg) by Cuba's Reinaldo Valiente.

== 1976 Olympic record ==
Below is the record of Antonio Rubio Fernández, a Spanish lightweight boxer who competed in the 1976 Montreal Olympics:

- Round of 64: bye:
- Round of 32: lost to Reinaldo Valiente (Cuba) referee stopped contest in the second round
