= Harald Bundli =

Norwegian cyclist

Personal information
- Born: 15 April 1953 (age 73) Oslo, Norway

Cycling career
- Sport: Cycling

Harald Bundli (born 15 April 1953) is a Norwegian cyclist born in Oslo.

He competed at the 1972 Summer Olympics in Munich, and at the 1976 Summer Olympics in Montreal.
