= Vlado Fumić =

Yugoslav cyclist

Personal information
- Born: 5 April 1956 (age 70)

Cycling career
- Sport: Cycling

Vlado Fumić (born 5 April 1956) is a Yugoslav former cyclist. He competed in the sprint and 1000m time trial events at the 1976 Summer Olympics.
