= Tsvetan Tsvetkov =

Bulgarian boxer

Personal information
- Nationality: Bulgarian
- Born: 23 January 1954 (age 71)

Sport
- Sport: Boxing

Tsvetan Tsvetkov (born 23 January 1954) is a Bulgarian boxer. He competed in the men's lightweight event at the 1976 Summer Olympics.
