= Shane Sutton =

Australian cyclist

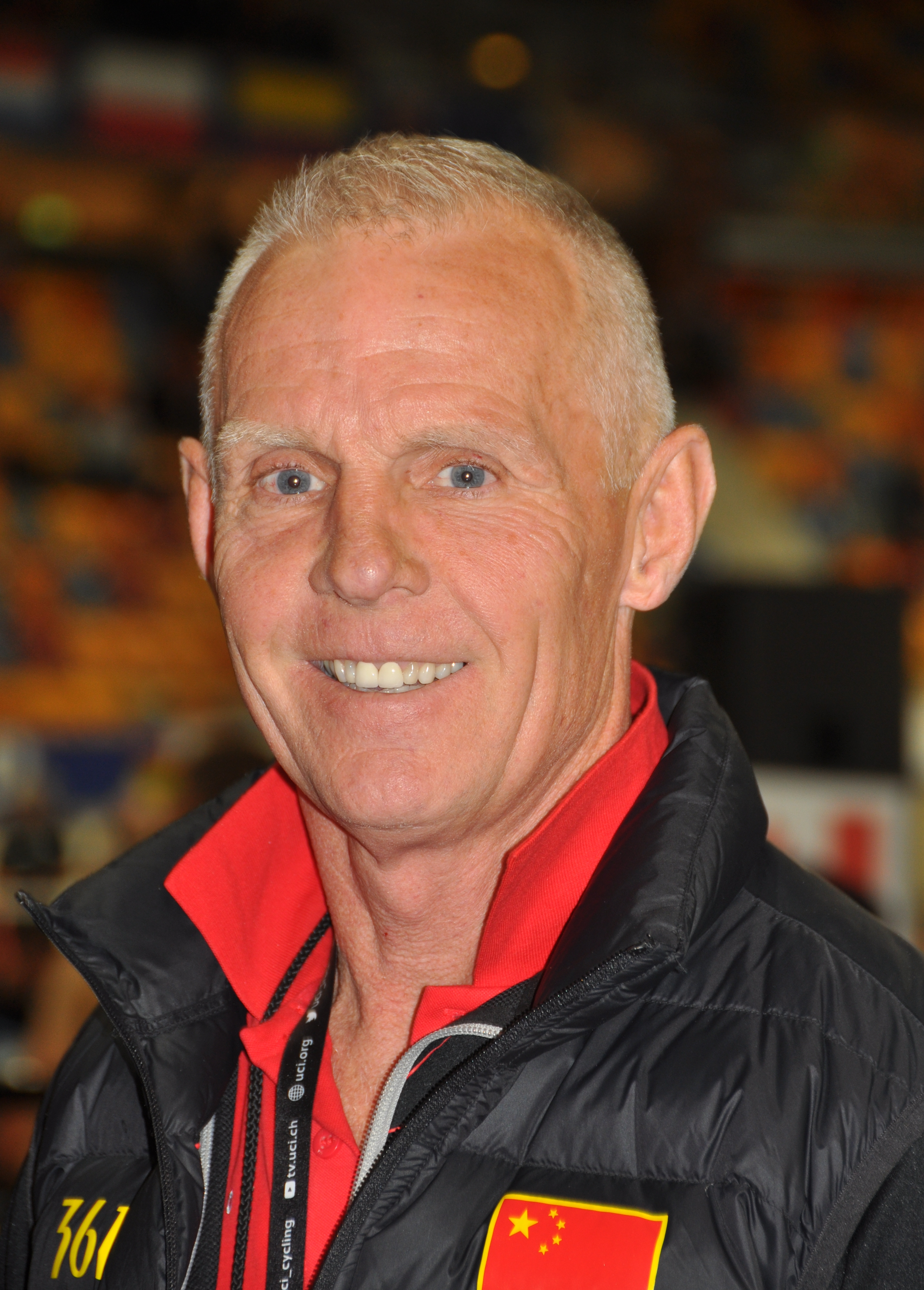
- Shane Sutton (2018)

Personal information
- Full name: Shane Sutton
- Born: 13 June 1957 (age 69) Moree, New South Wales, Australia

Cycling career
- Sport: Cycling
- Disciplines: Track & Road
- Role: Rider

Professional teams
- 1982: Mavic - Clemenso
- 1983: Clarence St. Cyclery
- 1984: Ever Ready - Marlboro
- 1985: Falcon - Maillard
- 1986: Falcon - Hutchinson
- 1987: Lycra - Halfords
- 1988: PMS - Dawes
- 1989: PMS - Falcon
- 1990-1991: Banana - Falcon
- 1993: Banana

Major wins
- Commonwealth Games; Milk Race

Shane Edwin Sutton OBE (born 13 June 1957) is an Australian-born former professional racing cyclist and cycling coach.

== Racing career ==
He rode under Phil Griffiths as a member of the first British-based professional team to enter the Tour de France in 1987 and went on to win the 1990 Milk Race. Sutton was also one of the four men to win gold in the team pursuit for Australia at the 1978 Commonwealth Games along with his brother, Gary Sutton.

== Coaching career ==
After retiring Shane worked as a coach with Welsh Cycling, taking the team to a successful Manchester Commonwealth Games before joining the British Cycling set-up in 2002. He was also employed as head coach at Team Sky but scaled back his involvement to become a part-time performance adviser for the professional team in 2013. Following the departure of Dave Brailsford from his role as British Cycling's Performance Director in April 2014, Sutton was promoted from his previous position as head coach to the newly created role of Technical Director.

Sutton resigned from British Cycling in 2016, after allegations of discrimination were made against him by Paralympic gold medalist Darren Kenny and cyclist Jessica Varnish. A subsequent internal investigation by British Cycling upheld a complaint of "inappropriate and discriminatory language" used by Sutton against Varnish. UK Sport, the UK national sport funding body, expressed serious concerns over British Cycling's handling of the investigation.

During 2017 and 2018, Sutton was head coach for the national Chinese track cycling team.

== Awards ==
Shane was awarded the accolade of Sports Council for Wales' (now Sport Wales) Coach of the Year Award in 1998.

Sutton won the "Coach of the Year Award" at the sports coach UK Coaching Awards in December 2008. He was also one of seven coaches to win a "High Performance Coach of the Year" award.

Sutton was appointed Officer of the Order of the British Empire (OBE) in the 2010 Birthday Honours.

== Results ==
1978
Team Pursuit Commonwealth Games (with Colin Fitzgerald, Kevin Nichols and Gary Sutton)

1981
5th Herald Sun Tour
Fastest time Goulburn to Sydney Classic

1982
55th World Road Race Championships
1st Bendigo International Madison (with Danny Clark)

1983
3rd Australian National Road Race Championships
1st Herald Sun Tour

1st Stage 2, Herald Sun Tour
1st Stage 6, Herald Sun Tour
1st Stage 11, Herald Sun Tour
1st Stage 16, Herald Sun Tour

1st Bendigo International Madison (with Gary Sutton)
1st and fastest time Goulburn to Sydney Classic

1984
3rd Australian National Road Race Championships
5th Beeston
1st Newport
1st Stage 10, Griffin 1000
8th Herald Sun Tour

1st Stage 2, Herald Sun Tour

1985
3rd Sealink International

1st Stage 8, Sealink International

1986
3rd Milk Race

1987
9th Norwich Spring Classic
15th Tour of Ireland

1st Stage 18, Herald Sun Tour

1988
10th Milk Race
5th Herald Sun Tour

1st Stage 8, Herald Sun Tour

1989
9th Herald Sun Tour

1st Stage 5, Herald Sun Tour
2nd Stage 10, Herald Sun Tour

1990

1st in General Classification Milk Race

1st Stage 3, Milk Race

1991
4th Mazda Alpine Tour

1993
(United Kingdom) 3rd British National Road Race Championships
