= Leslie Rawlins =

Trinidad and Tobago cyclist

Personal information
- Born: 28 June 1954 (age 72) Buenos Ayres, Trinidad and Tobago

Cycling career
- Sport: Cycling

Leslie Rawlins (born 28 June 1954) is a Trinidad former cyclist. He competed in the sprint event at the 1976 Summer Olympics. He was a national champion and considered a "household name" in his country. He was also a silver medalist at the Central American and Caribbean Games.
