= Michel Vaarten =

Belgian cyclist (born 1957)

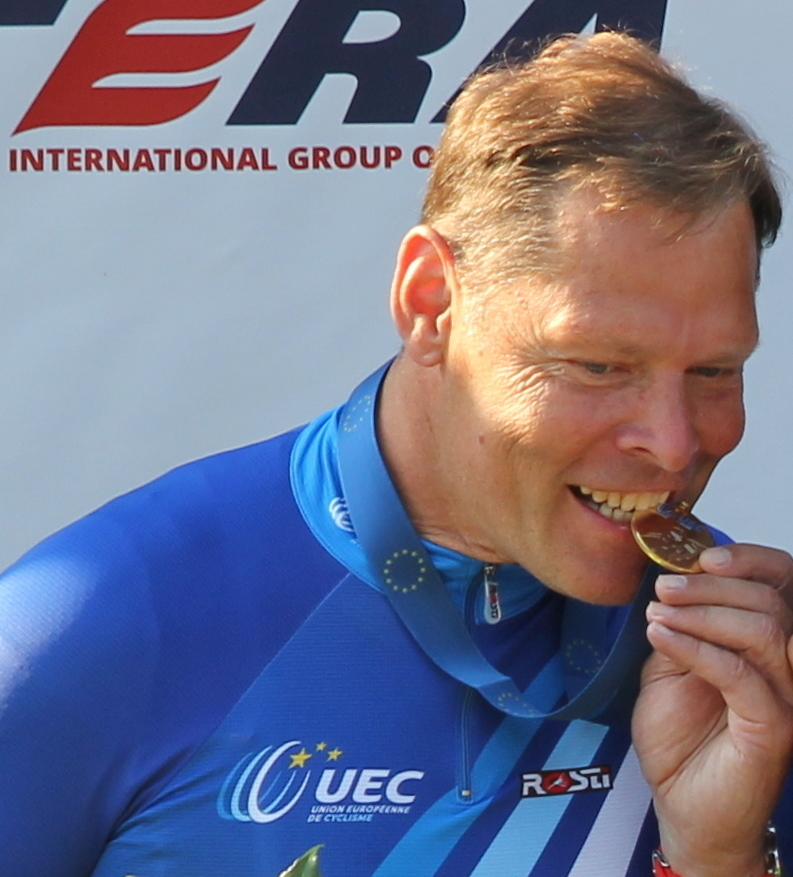
- Vaarten in 2015

Personal information
- Born: 17 January 1957 (age 69) Turnhout, Belgium

Cycling career
- Sport: Cycling
- Current team: Retired
- Disciplines: Track; Road
- Role: Rider
- Rider type: Sprinter

Professional teams
- 1979: Mini-Flat–V.D.B.–Pirelli
- 1980: Eurobouw
- 1981: Fangio–Sapeco–Mavic
- 1982: Amko Sport
- 1983–1985: Suntour
- 1986–1989: Schwinn–Icy Hot
- 1990–1991: Sakae–3 Rensho
- 1992: Buysse Babyartikelen
Medal record
Men's track cycling
Representing Belgium
Olympic Games
Silver medal – second place	1976 Montreal	1000m time trial
World Championships
Gold medal – first place	1986 Colorado Springs	Keirin
Silver medal – second place	1986 Colorado Springs	Points race
Silver medal – second place	1990 Maebashi	Keirin
Bronze medal – third place	1979 Amsterdam	Individual sprint
Bronze medal – third place	1988 Ghent	Keirin
European Championships
Gold medal – first place	1980 Ghent	Madison

Michel Vaarten (born 17 January 1957) is a retired track cyclist and road bicycle racer from Belgium. He represented Belgium at the 1976 Summer Olympics in Montreal, Quebec, Canada, where he won silver medal in the 1.000m time trial behind East Germany's Klaus-Jürgen Grünke. Vaarten was a professional from 1979 to 1992. He won 12 national titles, one European title and one world title, mainly in track cycling. In 1976 he won the International Champion of Champions sprint at Herne Hill velodrome. Vaarten is currently piloting a Derny bike in many Six Day Cycling events around Europe.

After his competitive career, he served as a pacemaker.
