= Ron Boyle =

Australian cyclist (born 1947)

Personal information
- Born: 25 August 1947 (age 79)

Cycling career
- Sport: Cycling
Medal record
Representing AUS
Men's cycling
Commonwealth Games
Bronze medal – third place	1978 Edmonton	Men's Tandem

Ron Boyle (born 25 August 1947) is an Australian former cyclist. He competed in the sprint event at the 1976 Summer Olympics.
