= Ove Lundby =

Swedish boxer

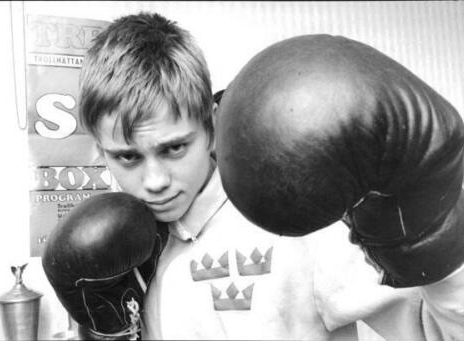

Personal information
- Nickname: Jätten
- Nationality: Swedish
- Born: 21 September 1953 (age 71); Stockholm, Sweden
- Height: 179 cm (5 ft 10 in)
- Weight: 60 kg (132 lb)

Sport
- Sport: Boxing
- Club: BK Örnen, Stockholm

Lars Ove Lundby (born 21 September 1953) is a Swedish retired boxer who competed at the 1972 and 1976 Summer Olympics. Lundy benefited from a very favorable draw in the 1976 Olympic tournament, getting two byes and a walkover win. Without having to compete against anyone, he advanced into the quarterfinals. In his opening bout, he lost to Simion Cutov of Romania by unanimous decision.
