= Vassily Solomin =

Russian boxer

Medal record

Men's Boxing

Representing the Soviet Union

Olympic Games
Bronze medal – third place	1976 Montreal	Lightweight

World Amateur Championships
Gold medal – first place	1974 Havana	Lightweight

Vassily Anatolyevich Solomin (Russian: Василий Анатольевич Соломин; 5 January 1953, in Perm – 28 December 1997, in Perm) was a boxer who represented the Soviet Union at the 1976 Summer Olympics in Montreal, Quebec, Canada. There, he won a bronze medal in the lightweight division (– 60 kg), after being beaten in the semifinals by Romania's eventual silver medalist Simion Cuţov.

Solomin began training under Yuri Podshivalov in 1969 at Trudovye Rezervy in Perm. He won the world title at the inaugural 1974 World Amateur Boxing Championships in Havana, Cuba. From 1975 he represented the Armed Forces sports society. He was coached by Viktor Ageev.

== 1976 Olympic results ==
Below are the results of Solomin in the lightweight division at the 1976 Montreal Olympics:

- Round of 64: bye
- Round of 32: Defeated Hans-Henrik Palm (Denmark) by decision, 5-0
- Round of 16: Defeated Bogdan Gajda (Poland) by decision, 5-0
- Quarterfinal: Defeated András Botos (Hungary) by decision, 5-0
- Semifinal: Lost to Simion Cuţov (Romania) by decision, 0-5 (was awarded bronze medal)
