= Jimmy Richards =

Welsh rugby union footballer

- Born: James Mervyn Richards; 11 December 1975 (age 50) Pembrokeshire, Wales
- Height: 5 ft 9 in (175 cm)
- Weight: 220 lb (100 kg)

Rugby union career
- Position: Hooker
Amateur team(s)
Years	Team	Apps	(Points)
1998–1999	Bedford Blues		
2003–2004	Leicester Tigers		
2005–2010	Harlequin F.C.		

James Mervyn Richards (born 11 December 1975) is a Welsh rugby union player. Richards played club rugby for Bedford, Worcester Warriors, Newport RFC, Gwent Dragons, Harlequins and Leicester Tigers. He recently helped by coaching at Beckenham RFC specifically with the forwards.
