= Gary Sutton =

Australian racing cyclist (born 1955)

Personal information
- Born: 27 March 1955 (age 71) Moree, New South Wales, Australia

Cycling career
- Sport: Cycling
- Disciplines: Track & Road
- Role: Rider, Coach

Professional teams
- 1982: Termolan - Galli
- 1983: Termolan - Galli - Ciocc
- 1984: Clarence St. Cyclery
- 1985: Spenco - Gazelle
- 1989: PMS - Falcon

Major wins
- Amateur World Points Race Champion - 1980.
Medal record
Representing AUS
Men's cycling
Commonwealth Games
| Silver medal – second place | 1974 Christchurch | Team Pursuit |
| Bronze medal – third place | 1974 Christchurch | Individual Pursuit |
| Gold medal – first place | 1978 Edmonton | Team Pursuit |

Gary John Sutton (born 27 March 1955) is a cycling coach and a former professional racing cyclist. In 1980, Sutton became the amateur World Champion in the Points Race.

Sutton was born in Moree, New South Wales. He competed at the 1976 Summer Olympics and the 1980 Summer Olympics. He was one of the four men to win gold in the team pursuit for Australia at the 1978 Commonwealth Games along with his brother, Shane Sutton, who has worked as National Technical Director for British Cycling. Gary is also the father of Christopher Sutton, a professional racing cyclist.

After retiring from competition, Sutton became a coach, spending 26 years as a national coach with Cycling Australia. In May 2017, it was announced that Cycling Australia would not renew the contract for his position as women's endurance coach beyond the end of June. In August of the same year, USA Cycling announced that Sutton had been appointed as their track endurance head coach.

Sutton partnered Hugh Porter as the BBC's commentary team for the cycling events at the 2008 Summer Olympics in Beijing.

== Palmarès ==
1974
2nd Team Pursuit, Commonwealth Games
3rd Pursuit, Commonwealth Games

1978
1st Team Pursuit Commonwealth Games (with Colin Fitzgerald, Kevin Nichols and Shane Sutton)

1980
1st Prologue, GP Wilhelm Tell
1st Amateur Points Race 1980 Track Cycling World Championships

1982
8th Ronde van Midden-Zeeland
1st and fastest time Goulburn to Sydney Classic

1983
1st Bendigo International Madison with Shane Sutton

1984
1st Herald Sun Tour

1st Stage 3, Herald Sun Tour
1st Stage 6, Herald Sun Tour
1st Stage 9, Herald Sun Tour
1st Stage 18, Herald Sun Tour

1st Stage 3, Yorkshire Classic (Harrogate)
1st Whitby
4th Newport, East Riding of Yorkshire
5th Yorkshire Classic (Harrogate)

1990

9th Herald Sun Tour

1st Stage 14, Herald Sun Tour
