= Simion Cuțov =

Romanian boxer

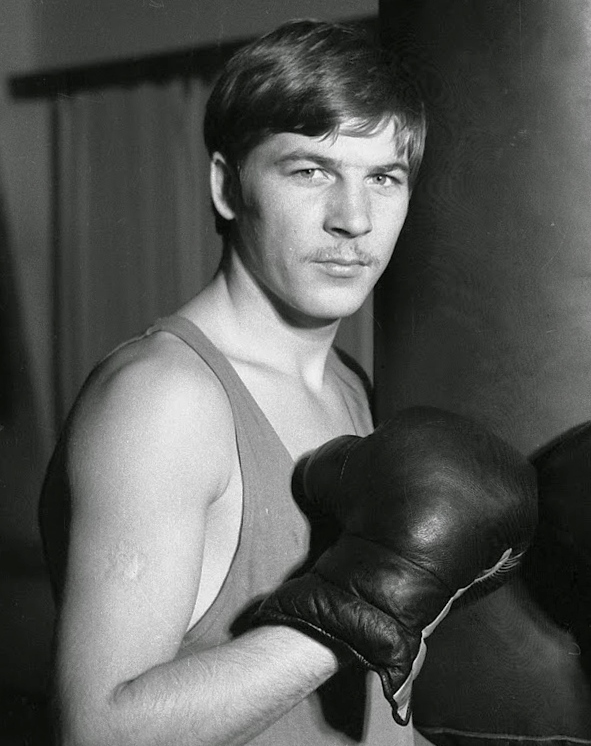
- Cuțov in the 1970s

Personal information
- Born: 7 May 1952 Smârdanul-Nou, Brăila, Romania
- Died: 1993 (aged 40–41) Sibiu, Romania

Sport
- Sport: Boxing
- Club: Dinamo București
- Coached by: Gheorghe Bobinaru
Medal record
Representing Romania
Romania National Amateur Boxing Championships
Gold medal – first place	1973 Cluj	-60 kg
Gold medal – first place	1978 Bucharest	-63.5 kg
Olympic Games
Silver medal – second place	1976 Montreal	-60 kg
World Amateur Championships
Silver medal – second place	1974 Havana	-60 kg
European Amateur Championships
Gold medal – first place	1973 Belgrade	-60 kg
Gold medal – first place	1975 Katowice	-60 kg

Simion Cuțov (7 May 1952 – 1993) was a lightweight boxer from Romania who won the European amateur title in 1973 and 1975. He competed at the 1974 World Championships and 1976 and 1980 Olympics and won silver medals in 1974 and 1976. In 1974, he won a gold medal at the Balkan Games. He retired with a record of 20 losses out of 155 bouts. His elder brother Calistrat was also an Olympic boxer.

== 1976 Olympic results ==
Below is the record of Simion Cuțov at the 1976 Montreal Olympics:

- Round of 64: bye
- Round of 32: defeated Sylvester Mittee (Great Britain) referee stopped contest in the third round
- Round of 16: defeated Nelson Calzadilla (Venezuela) by decision, 5–0
- Quarterfinal: defeated Ove Lundby (Sweden) by decision, 5–0
- Semifinal: defeated Vassily Solomin (Soviet Union) by decision, 5–0
- Final: lost to Howard Davis (United States) by decision, 0-5 (was awarded silver medal)
