= Yves Jeudy =

Haitian boxer (born 1958)

Personal information
- Born: 5 May 1958
- Died: 12 October 2008 (aged 50)
- Height: 165 cm (5 ft 5 in)
Medal record
Men's boxing
Representing Haiti
Central American and Caribbean Games
Bronze medal – third place	1974 Santo Domingo	Lightweight

Yves Jeudy (5 May 1958 – 12 October 2008) was a boxer from Haiti, who competed in the lightweight (- 60 kg) division at the 1976 Summer Olympics. Jeudy lost his opening bout to Ace Rusevski of Yugoslavia in the quarter-finals after the referee stopped the contest in the second round. Previously, Jeudy received two byes and a walkover. Jeudy won a bronze medal at the 1974 Central American and Caribbean Games in the lightweight division.
