= Colin Fitzgerald =

Australian cyclist (born 1955)

Personal information
- Born: 26 November 1955 (age 70)

Cycling career
- Sport: Cycling
Medal record
Representing AUS
Men's cycling
Commonwealth Games
Gold medal – first place	1978 Edmonton	Men's Team Pursuit

Colin John Fitzgerald (born 26 November 1955) is an Australian former cyclist. He competed in the team pursuit event at the 1980 Summer Olympics.
