= Mike Richards (cyclist) =

New Zealand cyclist (born 1958)

Personal information
- Born: 11 October 1958 (age 68) Auckland, New Zealand

Cycling career
- Sport: Cycling

Michael Basil Richards (born 11 October 1958) is a track cyclist from New Zealand. At the 1976 Summer Olympics at Montreal he came 9th in the 4000m individual pursuit.

He is a brother of cyclist Jamie Richards who also competed at the 1976 Olympics.
