= Jamie Richards (cyclist) =

New Zealand cyclist (born 1957)

James Blake "Jamie" Richards (born 2 March 1957) is a cyclist from New Zealand.

Richards was born in Pukekohe, Auckland, in 1957. Mike Richards is his younger brother.

Richards competed in the individual road race event at the 1976 Summer Olympics; he did not finish the race.
