= Erol Küçükbakırcı =

Turkish cyclist

Personal information
- Born: 20 April 1952 (age 74) Konya, Turkey

Cycling career
- Sport: Cycling

Erol Küçükbakırcı (born 20 April 1952) is a Turkish former cyclist. He competed at the 1972 Summer Olympics and 1976 Summer Olympics. In 2016, he became President of the Turkish Cycling Federation.
