= Dimo Angelov Tonchev =

Bulgarian cyclist

Personal information
- Born: 27 December 1952 (age 73) Burgas, Bulgaria

Cycling career
- Sport: Cycling

Dimo Angelov Tonchev (Bulgarian: Димо Ангелов Тончев; born 27 December 1952) is a Bulgarian former cyclist. He competed at the 1972 Summer Olympics and 1976 Summer Olympics.
