= Xavier Mirander =

Jamaican cyclist

Personal information
- Full name: Rudolph Xavier Mirander
- Born: 3 January 1951 (age 75) Kingston, Jamaica

Cycling career
- Sport: Cycling

Rudolph Xavier Mirander (born 5 January 1951) is a Jamaican former cyclist. He competed at the 1972 Summer Olympics and the 1976 Summer Olympics. He was also a silver medalist at the 1974 Commonwealth Games and a gold medalist at the 1974 Central American and Caribbean Games.
