= Mikhail Kountras =

Greek cyclist (born 1952)

Personal information
- Born: 31 January 1952 (age 74) Rhodes, Greece

Cycling career
- Sport: Cycling

Mikhail Kountras (born 31 January 1952) is a Greek former cyclist. He competed in three events at the 1976 Summer Olympics.
