= Roberto Andino =

Puerto Rican boxer (born 1956)

Personal information
- Born: October 4, 1956 (age 69)
Medal record
Men's Boxing
Representing Puerto Rico
Pan American Games
Silver medal – second place	1979 San Juan	Lightweight

Roberto Andino (born October 4, 1956) is a retired boxer from Puerto Rico, who competed in the men's lightweight division (– 60 kg). He represented his native country at the 1976 Summer Olympics in Montréal, Canada. Andino captured the silver medal at the 1979 Pan American Games.

== 1976 Olympic results ==
Below are the results of Roberto Andino, a lightweight boxer from Puerto Rico who competed at the 1976 Montreal Olympics:

- Round of 64: Defeated Gaetano Pirasta (Italy) on points, 5-0
- Round of 32: Lost to Ace Rusevski (Yugoslavia) referee stopped contest in the third round
