= Swimming at the 1976 Summer Olympics – Women's 200 metre backstroke =

Women's 200 metre backstroke at the Games of the XXI Olympiad
- Venue: Montreal Olympic pool
- Dates: 25 July 1976 (heats & final)
- Competitors: 31 from 17 nations
- Winning time: 2:13.43 OR

Medalists
1st place, gold medalist(s)		Ulrike Richter	East Germany
2nd place, silver medalist(s)		Birgit Treiber	East Germany
3rd place, bronze medalist(s)		Nancy Garapick	Canada

The women's 200 metre backstroke event for the 1976 Summer Olympics was held in Montreal. The event took place on July 25, 1976.

== Results ==
=== Heats ===
Heat 1

Rank	Athlete	Country	Time	Notes
1	Nancy Garapick	Canada	2:16.49	Q, OR
2	Wendy Cook-Hogg	Canada	2:17.30	Q
3	Monique Rodahl	New Zealand	2:19.22	
4	Naoko Miura	Japan	2:22.28	
5	Gabriella Verrasztó	Hungary	2:23.36	
6	Yoshimi Nishigawa	Japan	2:23.49	
7	Susan Hunter	New Zealand	2:26.21	
8	Sansanee Changkasiri	Thailand	2:48.56	

Heat 2

Rank	Athlete	Country	Time	Notes
1	Antje Stille	East Germany	2:18.07	Q
2	Cheryl Gibson	Canada	2:20.14	
3	Miriam Smith	United States	2:22.05	
4	Antonella Roncelli	Italy	2:24.45	
5	Joy Beasley	Great Britain	2:25.14	
6	Angelika Grieser	West Germany	2:25.38	
7	Karin Bormann	West Germany	2:26.72	
8	Liliana Cian	Colombia	2:37.06	

Heat 3

Rank	Athlete	Country	Time	Notes
1	Ulrike Richter	East Germany	2:17.58	Q
2	Klavdiya Studennikova	Soviet Union	2:18.47	Q
3	Maryanne Graham	United States	2:19.07	
4	Diane Edelijn	Netherlands	2:22.77	
5	Heike John	West Germany	2:25.55	
6	Kim Wilkinson	Great Britain	2:26.53	
7	Silvia Fontana	Spain	2:31.37	
8	Paola Ruggieri	Venezuela	2:34.89	

Heat 4

Rank	Athlete	Country	Time	Notes
1	Birgit Treiber	East Germany	2:17.62	Q
2	Melissa Belote	United States	2:17.63	Q
3	Nadiya Stavko	Soviet Union	2:17.67	Q
4	Glenda Robertson	Australia	2:18.62	
5	Sharron Davies	Great Britain	2:24.94	
6	Michelle de Vries	Australia	2:28.18	
7	Claudia Bellotto	Argentina	2:32.60	

=== Final ===
Rank	Athlete	Country	Time	Notes
1	Ulrike Richter	East Germany	2:13.43	OR
2	Birgit Treiber	East Germany	2:14.97	
3	Nancy Garapick	Canada	2:15.60	
4	Nadiya Stavko	Soviet Union	2:16.28	
5	Melissa Belote	United States	2:17.27	
6	Antje Stille	East Germany	2:17.55	
7	Klavdiya Studennikova	Soviet Union	2:17.74	
8	Wendy Cook-Hogg	Canada	2:17.95	
