= Swimming at the 1976 Summer Olympics – Women's 100 metre backstroke =

Women's 100 metre backstroke at the Games of the XXI Olympiad
- Venue: Montreal Olympic pool
- Dates: 20 July 1976 (heats & semifinals); 21 July 1976 (final)
- Competitors: 34 from 21 nations
- Winning time: 1:01.83 OR

Medalists
| 1st place, gold medalist(s) | | Ulrike Richter | East Germany |
| 2nd place, silver medalist(s) | | Birgit Treiber | East Germany |
| 3rd place, bronze medalist(s) | | Nancy Garapick | Canada |

The women's 100 metre backstroke event for the 1976 Summer Olympics was held in Montreal. The event took place on 20 and 21 July 1976.

== Results ==
=== Heats ===
Heat 1

| Rank | Athlete | Country | Time | Notes |
|---|---|---|---|---|
| 1 | Tauna Vandeweghe | United States | 1:05.00 | Q |
| 2 | Klavdiya Studennikova | Soviet Union | 1:05.56 | Q |
| 3 | Cheryl Gibson | Canada | 1:05.64 | Q |
| 4 | Antonella Roncelli | Italy | 1:06.59 | |
| 5 | Sylvie Testuz | France | 1:07.62 | |
| 6 | Paola Ruggieri | Venezuela | 1:11.14 | |

Heat 2

| Rank | Athlete | Country | Time | Notes |
|---|---|---|---|---|
| 1 | Nancy Garapick | Canada | 1:03.28 | Q |
| 2 | Michelle de Vries | Australia | 1:06.22 | Q |
| 3 | Gabriella Verrasztó | Hungary | 1:06.27 | |
| 4 | Amanda James | Great Britain | 1:07.28 | |
| 5 | Angelika Grieser | West Germany | 1:08.08 | |
| 6 | Liliana Cian | Colombia | 1:11.62 | |
| 7 | Sansanee Changkasiri | Thailand | 1:19.15 | |

Heat 3

| Rank | Athlete | Country | Time | Notes |
|---|---|---|---|---|
| 1 | Birgit Treiber | East Germany | 1:04.34 | Q |
| 2 | Linda Jezek | United States | 1:04.69 | Q |
| 3 | Karin Bormann | West Germany | 1:06.33 | |
| 4 | Renee Magee | United States | 1:06.44 | |
| 5 | Joy Beasley | Great Britain | 1:06.66 | |
| 6 | Claudia Bellotto | Argentina | 1:10.27 | |
| 7 | Raphaelynne Lee | Hong Kong | 1:14.66 | |

Heat 4

| Rank | Athlete | Country | Time | Notes |
|---|---|---|---|---|
| 1 | Antje Stille | East Germany | 1:04.34 | Q |
| 2 | Enith Brigitha | Netherlands | 1:04.98 | Q |
| 3 | Nadiya Stavko | Soviet Union | 1:05.39 | Q |
| 4 | Glenda Robertson | Australia | 1:06.19 | Q |
| 5 | Monique Rodahl | New Zealand | 1:06.73 | |
| 6 | Naoko Miura | Japan | 1:08.31 | |
| 7 | Deirdre Sheehan | Ireland | 1:11.53 | |

Heat 5

| Rank | Athlete | Country | Time | Notes |
|---|---|---|---|---|
| 1 | Ulrike Richter | East Germany | 1:03.61 | Q |
| 2 | Wendy Cook-Hogg | Canada | 1:04.31 | Q |
| 3 | Diane Edelijn | Netherlands | 1:05.56 | Q |
| 4 | Yoshimi Nishigawa | Japan | 1:05.78 | Q |
| 5 | Heike John | West Germany | 1:06.20 | Q |
| 6 | Gunilla Lundberg | Sweden | 1:07.73 | |
| 7 | Pierrette Michel | Belgium | 1:12.73 | |

=== Semifinals ===
Heat 1

| Rank | Athlete | Country | Time | Notes |
|---|---|---|---|---|
| 1 | Ulrike Richter | East Germany | 1:02.39 | Q |
| 2 | Birgit Treiber | East Germany | 1:04.21 | Q |
| 3 | Cheryl Gibson | Canada | 1:04.89 | Q |
| 4 | Klavdiya Studennikova | Soviet Union | 1:05.73 | |
| 5 | Linda Jezek | United States | 1:06.01 | |
| 6 | Michelle de Vries | Australia | 1:06.02 | |
| 7 | Tauna Vandeweghe | United States | 1:06.29 | |
| 8 | Glenda Robertson | Australia | 1:06.93 | |

Heat 2

| Rank | Athlete | Country | Time | Notes |
|---|---|---|---|---|
| 1 | Nancy Garapick | Canada | 1:03.75 | Q |
| 2 | Antje Stille | East Germany | 1:03.94 | Q |
| 3 | Wendy Cook-Hogg | Canada | 1:04.17 | Q |
| 4 | Enith Brigitha | Netherlands | 1:05.21 | Q |
| 5 | Nadiya Stavko | Soviet Union | 1:05.23 | Q |
| 6 | Diane Edelijn | Netherlands | 1:05.58 | |
| 7 | Heike John | West Germany | 1:06.26 | |
| 8 | Yoshimi Nishigawa | Japan | 1:06.46 | |

=== Final ===
| Rank | Athlete | Country | Time | Notes |
|---|---|---|---|---|
| 1 | Ulrike Richter | East Germany | 1:01.83 | OR |
| 2 | Birgit Treiber | East Germany | 1:03.41 | |
| 3 | Nancy Garapick | Canada | 1:03.71 | |
| 4 | Wendy Cook-Hogg | Canada | 1:03.93 | |
| 5 | Cheryl Gibson | Canada | 1:05.16 | |
| 6 | Nadiya Stavko | Soviet Union | 1:05.19 | |
| 7 | Antje Stille | East Germany | 1:05.30 | |
| 8 | Diane Edelijn | Netherlands | 1:05.53 | |
