= Vandeweghe =

Vandeweghe, Van de Weghe or Vande Weghe (pronounced [vɑn də ˈʋeːɣə]), also spelled Vandewege or Van de Wege, is a Dutch-language surname from Flanders. Notable people with the surname include:

- Al Vande Weghe (1916–2002), American swimmer
- Al Vandeweghe (1920–2014), American football player
- Bud VanDeWege (born 1958), American basketball coach
- Charles Vandeweghe (born 1982), Belgian field hockey player
- CoCo Vandeweghe (born 1991), American tennis player
- Ernie Vandeweghe (1928–2014), American basketball player and physician
- Kevin Van De Wege (born 1974), American firefighter and politician
- Kiki VanDeWeghe (born 1958), American basketball executive, former player and coach
- Loïc Vandeweghe (born 1983), Belgian field hockey player
- Marc Van De Weghe (born 1964), Belgian swimmer
- Tauna Vandeweghe (born 1960), American swimmer
