= Ernest Vandeweghe =

Ernest Vandeweghe is the name of:

- Ernie Vandeweghe (1928–2014), former basketball player for the New York Knicks
- Kiki Vandeweghe (born 1958), his son, former basketball player for the Denver Nuggets, Portland Trail Blazers, New York Knicks and Los Angeles Clippers
