= Birgit Treiber =

East German swimmer

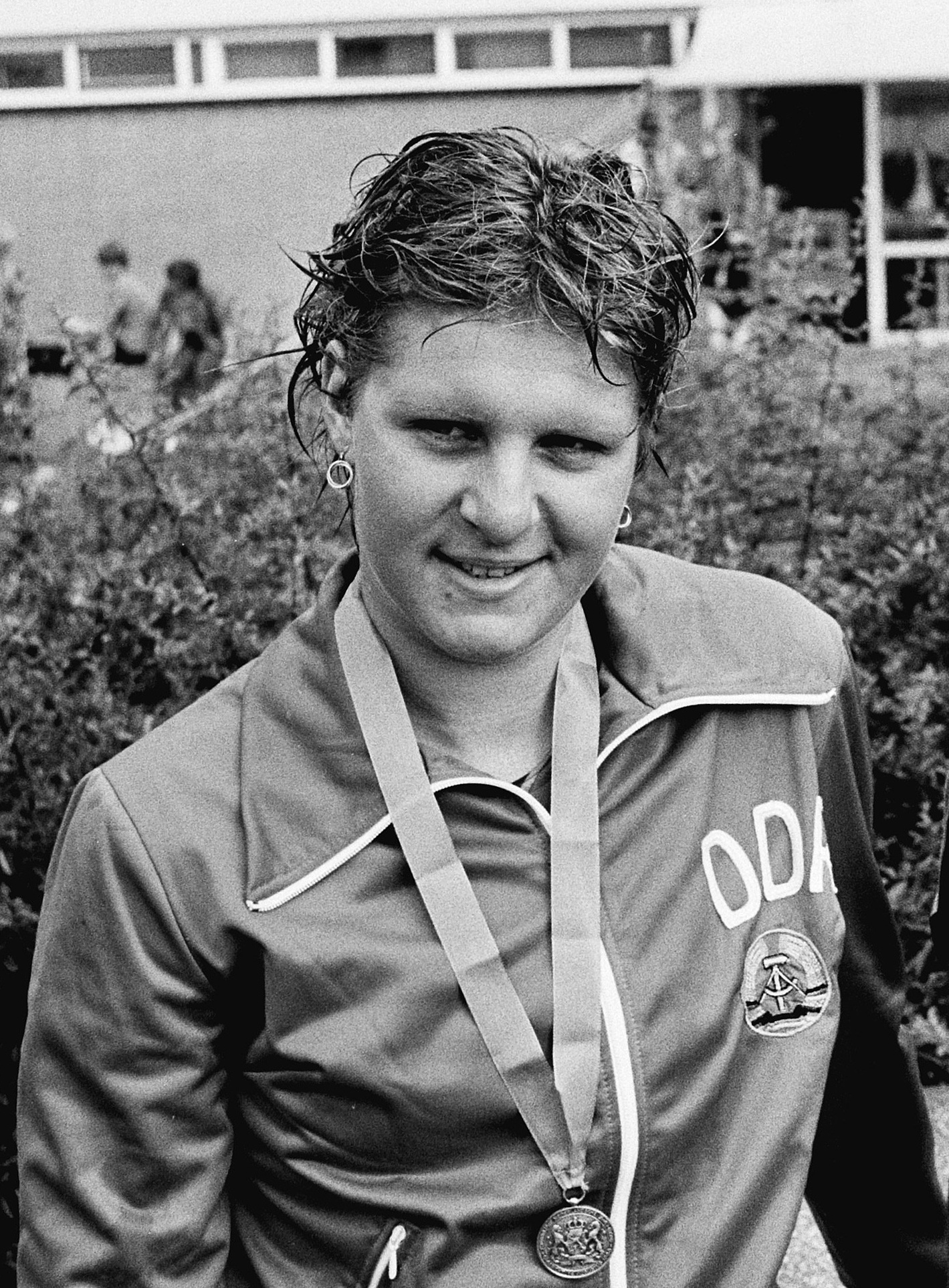
- Treiber in 1979

Personal information
- Born: 26 February 1960 (age 66) Oschatz, East Germany
- Height: 1.72 m (5 ft 8 in)
- Weight: 66 kg (146 lb)

Sport
- Sport: Swimming
- Strokes: Backstroke
- Club: SC Einheit Dresden
Medal record
Representing East Germany
Olympic Games
Gold medal – first place	1976 Montreal	4×100 m medley
Silver medal – second place	1976 Montreal	100 m backstroke
Silver medal – second place	1976 Montreal	200 m backstroke
Bronze medal – third place	1980 Moscow	200 m backstroke
World Championships
Gold medal – first place	1975 Cali	200 m backstroke
Silver medal – second place	1975 Cali	100 m backstroke
Silver medal – second place	1978 Berlin	4×100 m medley
Silver medal – second place	1978 Berlin	200 m backstroke
Silver medal – second place	1978 Berlin	100 m backstroke
European Championships
Gold medal – first place	1977 Jönköping	100 m backstroke
Gold medal – first place	1977 Jönköping	200 m backstroke
Gold medal – first place	1977 Jönköping	4×100 m medley

Birgit Treiber (born 26 February 1960) is a former swimmer from the German Democratic Republic. She won one gold and two silver medals in the 1976 Summer Olympics and a bronze medal in the 1980 Summer Olympics. It was later proven she was extensively involved in an illegal doping program that greatly improved her swimming abilities.

== Career ==
She began her international career in 1975, setting a new world record in the 200 m backstroke at the 1975 World Aquatics Championships, where she also won silver medal in the 100 m breaststroke.

At the 1976 Summer Olympics, she won a gold medal in the 4 × 100 m medley relay. She swam only in the preliminary round, where the East Germany team set a new Olympic record. In the 100 meters and 200 meters backstroke she finished second behind Ulrike Richter. In the same year she set world records in the 400 m individual medley and 200 m backstroke. Next year she won three gold medals at the European LC Championships 1977.

After winning three silver medals at the 1978 and a bronze medal at the 1980 Summer Olympics she ended her swimming career and became a dentist. It was later revealed that she was involved in the East Germany doping program.

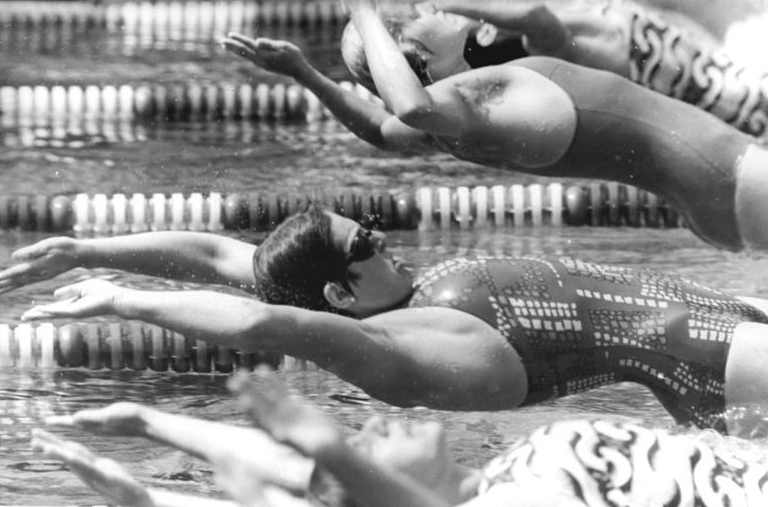
Treiber in 1978
