= Kim Wilkinson =

British swimmer

Personal information
- Born: 21 March 1961 (age 65)

Sport
- Sport: Swimming

Kim Wilkinson (born 21 March 1961) is a British former swimmer. She competed in the women's 200 metre backstroke at the 1976 Summer Olympics.
