= Nancy Garapick =

Canadian swimmer (1961–2026)

Personal information
- Full name: Nancy Ellen Garapick
- National team: Canada
- Born: September 24, 1961 Halifax, Nova Scotia, Canada
- Died: April 6, 2026 (aged 64) Langley, British Columbia, Canada
- Height: 1.68 m (5 ft 6 in)
- Weight: 54 kg (119 lb)

Sport
- Sport: Swimming
- Strokes: Backstroke, butterfly
Medal record
Women's swimming
Representing Canada
Olympic Games
Bronze medal – third place	1976 Montreal	100 m backstroke
Bronze medal – third place	1976 Montreal	200 m backstroke
World Championships (LC)
Silver medal – second place	1975 Cali	200 m backstroke
Bronze medal – third place	1975 Cali	100 m backstroke
Bronze medal – third place	1978 Berlin	4x100 m freestyle
Pan American Games
Silver medal – second place	1979 San Juan	200 m medley
Silver medal – second place	1979 San Juan	4x100 m medley
Bronze medal – third place	1979 San Juan	100 m butterfly
Bronze medal – third place	1979 San Juan	200 m butterfly
Bronze medal – third place	1979 San Juan	400 m medley

Nancy Ellen Garapick (September 24, 1961 – April 6, 2026) was a Canadian competitive swimmer, Olympic medallist, and onetime world record-holder. She won two bronze medals in the 100-metre backstroke and 200-metre backstroke at the 1976 Summer Olympics in Montreal at the age of 14, behind two East German athletes, Ulrike Richter and Birgit Treiber, who later were confirmed to be longstanding participants of the East German doping scandal of the 1970s. She broke the Olympic record for the 100-metre backstroke during the heats.

== Biography ==
As a 13-year old, Garapick set a world record in the 200m backstroke of 2:16:33 on April 27, 1975 at the Eastern Canadian Swimming Championships in Brantford, Ontario, as a member of the Halifax Trojan Aquatic Club, coached by Nigel Kemp.

In 2008, she was inducted into Canada's Sports Hall of Fame. The official ceremony took place November 5, 2008, in Toronto, Ontario.

In 2018 she was named one of the greatest 15 athletes in Nova Scotia's history.

Garapick died on April 6, 2026, at the age of 64.

== See also ==
- List of Olympic medalists in swimming (women)
- List of World Aquatics Championships medalists in swimming (women)
- World record progression 200 metres backstroke
