= Tauna Vandeweghe =

American competition swimmer (born 1960)

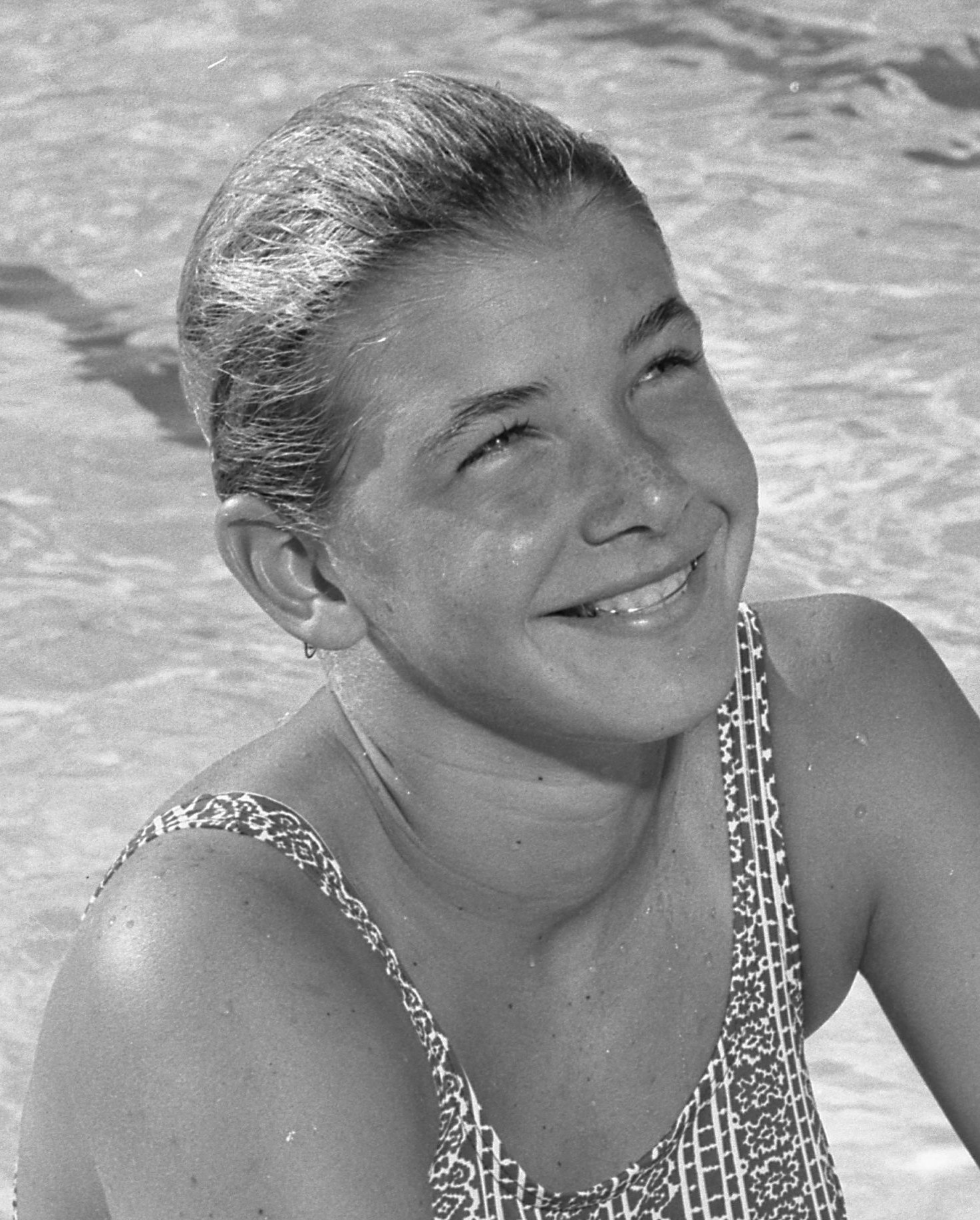
- Vandeweghe in 1973

Personal information
- Full name: Tauna Kay Vandeweghe
- National team: United States
- Born: February 7, 1960 (age 66) Green Valley, California, U.S.
- Height: 6 ft 1 in (1.85 m)
- Weight: 150 lb (68 kg)

Sport
- Sport: Swimming
- Strokes: Backstroke
- Club: Long Beach Swim Club
- College team: University of California, Los Angeles
Medal record
Women's Swimming
Representing United States
FINA World Aquatics Championships
Silver medal – second place	1975 Cali	4×100 m medley relay
Pan American Games
Silver medal – second place	1983 Caracas	Volleyball

Tauna Kay Vandeweghe (born February 7, 1960), also known by her married names Mrs. Tauna Mullarkey and Mrs. Tauna Oshea, is an American former competition swimmer who participated in the 1976 Summer Olympics in Montreal, Quebec. She competed in the 100-meter backstroke and advanced to the semifinals of the event, recording a best time of 1:05.00 in the preliminary heats. She won silver medals at the 1975 World Aquatics Championships in the 4 × 100 meter medley relay and at the 1983 Pan American Games in volleyball.

== Family ==
Vandeweghe is the daughter of NBA basketball player Ernie Vandeweghe and 1952 Miss America Colleen Kay Hutchins. Her brother Kiki Vandeweghe and uncle Mel Hutchins also played NBA basketball, and both were NBA All-Stars. With her first husband Robert, she has a son, Beau, who played volleyball for the Pepperdine Waves, and two daughters, Coco Vandeweghe, a professional tennis player, and Honnie Vandeweghe, a member of the US Women's National Water Polo Team.

== Personal life ==
Vandeweghe is a member of the Church of Jesus Christ of Latter-day Saints.

== See also ==
- List of University of California, Los Angeles people
- List of University of Southern California people
