= Halifax Trojan Aquatic Club =

- Founded: 1967
- President: Danny French
- Head coach: Chris Cormier
- Website: www.htac.ca

The Halifax Trojan Aquatic Club (HTAC) is a competitive swim team in Nova Scotia. HTAC is based out of Dalplex, the athletic facility for Dalhousie University, in Halifax, Nova Scotia. The Trojans also use Halifax's Centennial Pool as a secondary training facility.

HTAC is one of the oldest and largest swim teams in Atlantic Canada. The Trojans have 185 members at various competitive levels, ranging from novice/introductory levels through to nationally ranked competitors.

The Trojans have won many Swim Nova Scotia Short Course and Long Course Provincial Championship titles as well as several Short and Long Course East Coast Championships titles over its history.

== Famous swimmers ==
- Nancy Garapick, double Bronze Medalist and World Record holder at the 1976 Summer Olympics
- Susan Mason, National Team Member
- Carwai Seto, represented Taiwan at the 1988 Summer Olympics
- David Sharpe, represented Canada at the 2012 Summer Olympics
