= Colleen Kay Hutchins =

Miss America 1952

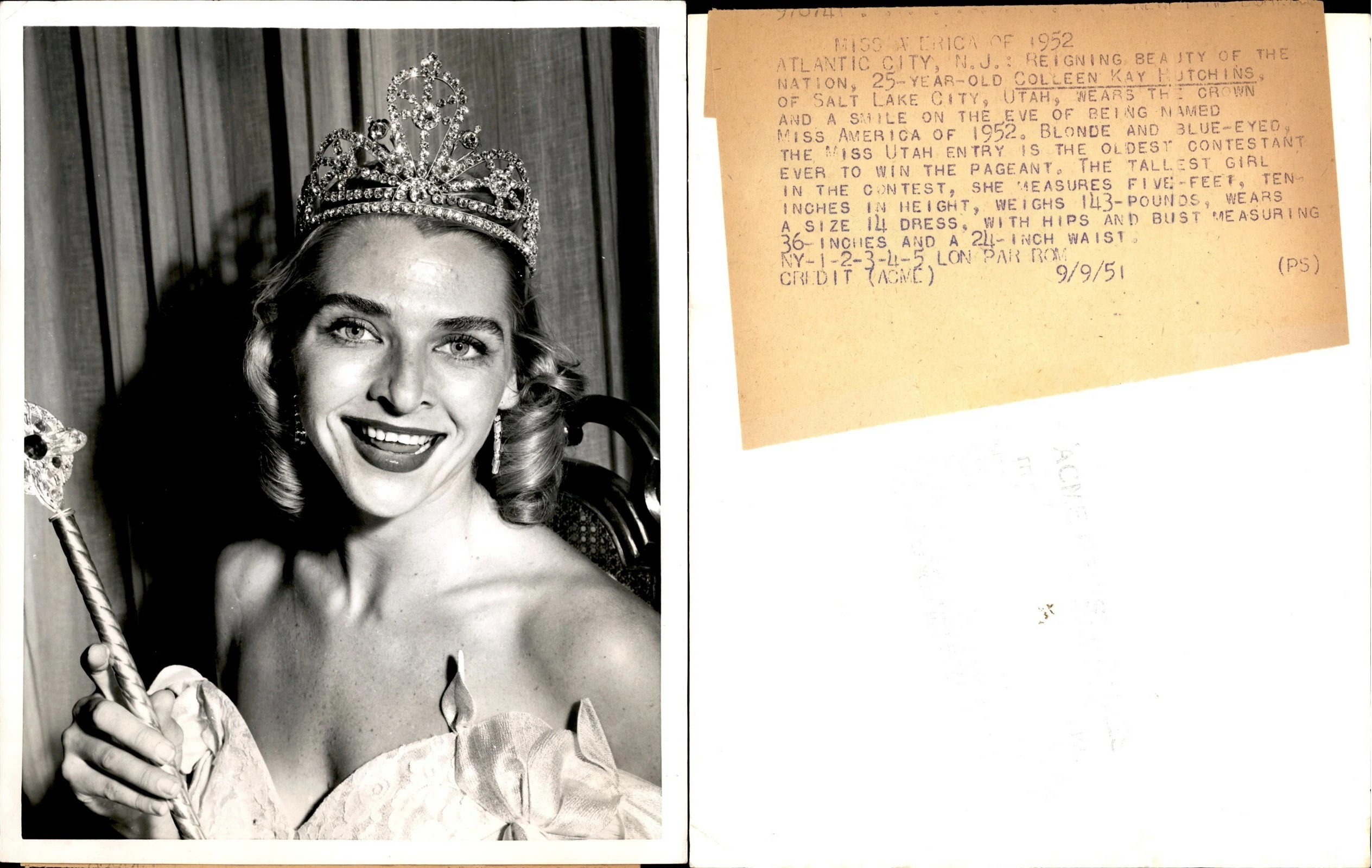
- Born: May 23, 1926; Salt Lake City, Utah, US
- Died: March 24, 2010 (aged 83); Newport Beach, California, US
- Education: Brigham Young University
- Title: Miss Utah 1951; Miss America 1952
- Predecessor: Yolande Betbeze
- Successor: Neva Jane Langley
- Spouse: Ernie Vandeweghe (m. 1953)
- Children: 4, including Kiki and Tauna Vandeweghe
- Relatives: Mel Hutchins (brother); CoCo Vandeweghe (granddaughter)

Colleen Kay Hutchins (May 23, 1926 – March 24, 2010) was Miss America 1952.

== Early life ==
Hutchins was a native of Arcadia, California. Her brother, Mel Hutchins, later became a basketball player for the Milwaukee Hawks, Fort Wayne Pistons, and New York Knicks.

== Pageantry ==
Hutchins was crowned as Brigham Young University's homecoming queen in 1947. In September 1951, she was crowned Miss America, the first Miss Utah to win the pageant.

== Personal life ==
Hutchins met her future husband Ernie Vandeweghe at a New York Knicks basketball game at Madison Square Garden after a friend introduced her to the team's forward. The couple married in May 1953, and had four children: son, Kiki, a professional basketball player and executive; daughter, Tauna, an Olympic swimmer, son, Bruk; and daughter, Heather. Hutchins is also the grandmother of professional tennis player CoCo Vandeweghe, daughter of Tauna. She was a member of the Church of Jesus Christ of Latter-day Saints.

The Vandeweghes resided in Indian Wells, California, Laguna Beach, California and Palm Springs, California. She died on March 24, 2010, in Newport Beach, at age 83.

== Sources ==
- Garr, Arnold K., Donald Q. Cannon and Richard O. Cowan ed., Encyclopedia of Latter-day Saint History, p. 526

Awards and achievements
Preceded by Yolande Betbeze	Miss America; 1952	Succeeded by Neva Jane Langley
Preceded by Joanne Hinand	Miss Utah; 1951	Succeeded by Marylyn Reese
