= CoCo Vandeweghe =

American tennis player (born 1991)

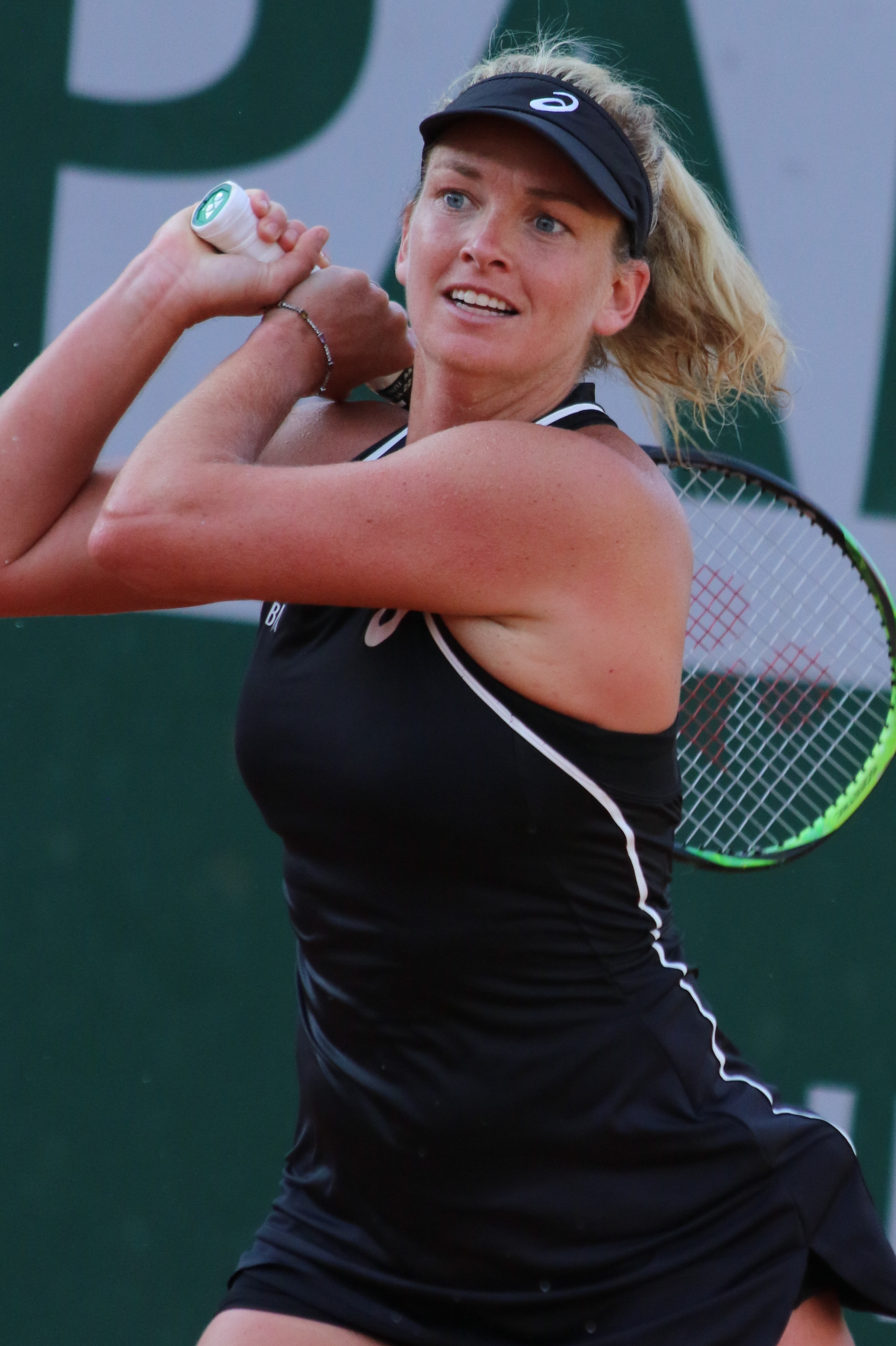
- Vandeweghe at the 2018 French Open
- Country (sports): United States
- Residence: Rancho Santa Fe, California, US
- Born: December 6, 1991 (age 34) New York, US
- Height: 1.85 m (6 ft 1 in)
- Turned pro: 2008
- Retired: 2023
- Plays: Right (two-handed backhand)
- Coach: Craig Kardon
- Prize money: $8,221,168

Singles
- Career record: 341–288
- Career titles: 2
- Highest ranking: No. 9 (January 15, 2018)

Grand Slam singles results
- Australian Open: SF (2017)
- French Open: 2R (2014, 2016, 2018)
- Wimbledon: QF (2015, 2017)
- US Open: SF (2017)

Doubles
- Career record: 128–111
- Career titles: 4
- Highest ranking: No. 14 (October 29, 2018)

Grand Slam doubles results
- Australian Open: QF (2016)
- French Open: 2R (2016)
- Wimbledon: 3R (2015, 2022)
- US Open: W (2018)

Other doubles tournaments
- Tour Finals: SF (2018)

Grand Slam mixed doubles results
- Australian Open: F (2016)
- French Open: QF (2016)
- Wimbledon: 2R (2016)
- US Open: F (2016)

Team competitions
- Fed Cup: W (2017), record 13–8
- Hopman Cup: F (2017)

CoCo Vandeweghe (/ˈvændəweɪ/ VAN-də-way; born Colleen Mullarkey, December 6, 1991) is an American former professional tennis player. A former US Open junior champion and top-10 singles player, she won two WTA Tour titles, both at the Rosmalen Grass Court Championships. In doubles, Vandeweghe won one major title at the 2018 US Open, with partner Ashleigh Barty.

In addition, she reached two major singles semifinals and the final of the WTA Elite Trophy to enter the top 10, reaching her career-high singles ranking of world No. 9 in January 2018. In addition, Vandeweghe twice reached the quarterfinals at Wimbledon in both 2015 and 2017. Despite being predominantly a singles player, she also excelled at doubles. In 2016, she partnered with Martina Hingis in much of the second half of the season and reached the semifinals of the US Open, a performance that lifted her to a then-career-high ranking of No. 18 in the world. In 2018, Vandeweghe won her first Grand Slam title, partnering Ashleigh Barty at the US Open. Later on, they reached the semifinals at the 2018 WTA Finals, lifting Vandeweghe to a new career-high ranking of No. 14. She is also a two-time Grand Slam finalist in mixed doubles, reaching the final at the 2016 Australian Open with Horia Tecău and the 2016 US Open with compatriot Rajeev Ram.

Vandeweghe's prowess at both singles and doubles helped her win all eight of her Fed Cup rubbers in 2017 across three different ties to lead the U.S. team to its first championship since 2000. Her best surface was grass.

== Early life ==
Born to 1976 Olympic swimmer Tauna Vandeweghe and her then-husband Robert Mullarkey, CoCo's maternal grandparents are 1952 Miss America Colleen Kay Hutchins and former New York Knicks basketball player Ernie Vandeweghe. Her uncle, her mother's brother, is basketball player Kiki VanDeWeghe, and her maternal grandmother's brother was NBA player Mel Hutchins. CoCo first started playing tennis with her elder brother, Beau, at the age of eleven. Tennis was the last sport she chose in her early life, after trying, among other things, basketball and wrestling. Vandeweghe eventually turned pro in April 2008. Self-described as a "total California girl", she spends most of her off-season at the beach with her family. She is good friends with fellow American players Madison Keys, Irina Falconi, and Shelby Rogers.

== Playing style ==
Vandeweghe is known to have one of the strongest serves on tour. In 2014, she hit 306 aces, third-highest on tour. She plays very aggressively, and likes to take the ball early and on the rise on both sides. Her groundstrokes are heavy and are delivered flat and powerful, particularly her forehand. Vandeweghe is efficient at the net and enjoys moving forward to avoid extended rallies. Because of her consistent serve, she has a solid mental game. Overall fitness and movement are cited as her main weaknesses, although they have been steadily improved. Her favorite shot is her forehand down the line, and her preferred surfaces are hard and grass courts. Previously, she was coached by Robert Van't Hof in Newport Beach, California, and Adam Peterson on the road. Pat Cash also coached her.

== Career ==
=== Juniors ===
As a junior, Vandeweghe was coached by Guy Fritz, the father of Taylor Fritz. In 2008, she reached the singles final of the USTA Girls 18s national championship as the 3rd-seed, losing to top-seeded Gail Brodsky. Vandeweghe also won the doubles event with Jamie Hampton, defeating the top-seeded pair of Brodsky and Mallory Cecil in the final. With these results, she earned wildcards into the main draws of the singles and doubles events at the US Open.

In general, Vandeweghe did not play many junior events and needed a wildcard to enter the 2008 US Open girls' singles tournament. Nonetheless, she would go on to win the championship without dropping a set. Vandeweghe moved up to the ITF circuit after the event, and this would end up being her last junior tournament. With the victory, she rose to a career-best junior ranking of No. 15 in the world.

=== Early professional years ===
Vandeweghe made her WTA Tour debut at the 2006 San Diego Classic at the age of 14, losing in the first round to Kateryna Bondarenko. The following year, she played there again as a wildcard and still lost in the first round.

In 2008, Vandeweghe played in her first Premier tournament at Miami, where she lost to Sabine Lisicki in the first round. At the US Open, where she would go on to win the girls' singles title, Vandeweghe made her debut in the main draw of a Grand Slam with the wildcard she received from reaching the finals of the USTA junior national championship. She would lose to second-seeded and eventual runner-up Jelena Janković in the first round.

In 2009, Vandeweghe obtained an invitation from the Hong Kong Tennis Patrons' Association to play the JB Group Classic exhibition tournament with compatriot Venus Williams and Argentine Gisela Dulko in January. The trio would win the competition, with Vandeweghe partnering with Williams to win their doubles match in the final. In March, she was granted a wildcard to play at Miami, but lost in the first round. In Vandeweghe's second WTA tournament of the year, she recorded her first WTA Tour-level win at the LA Women's Tennis Championships, defeating world No. 58, Tathiana Garbin, in the first round.

=== 2010–2011: Ascent into top 100, first major match win ===
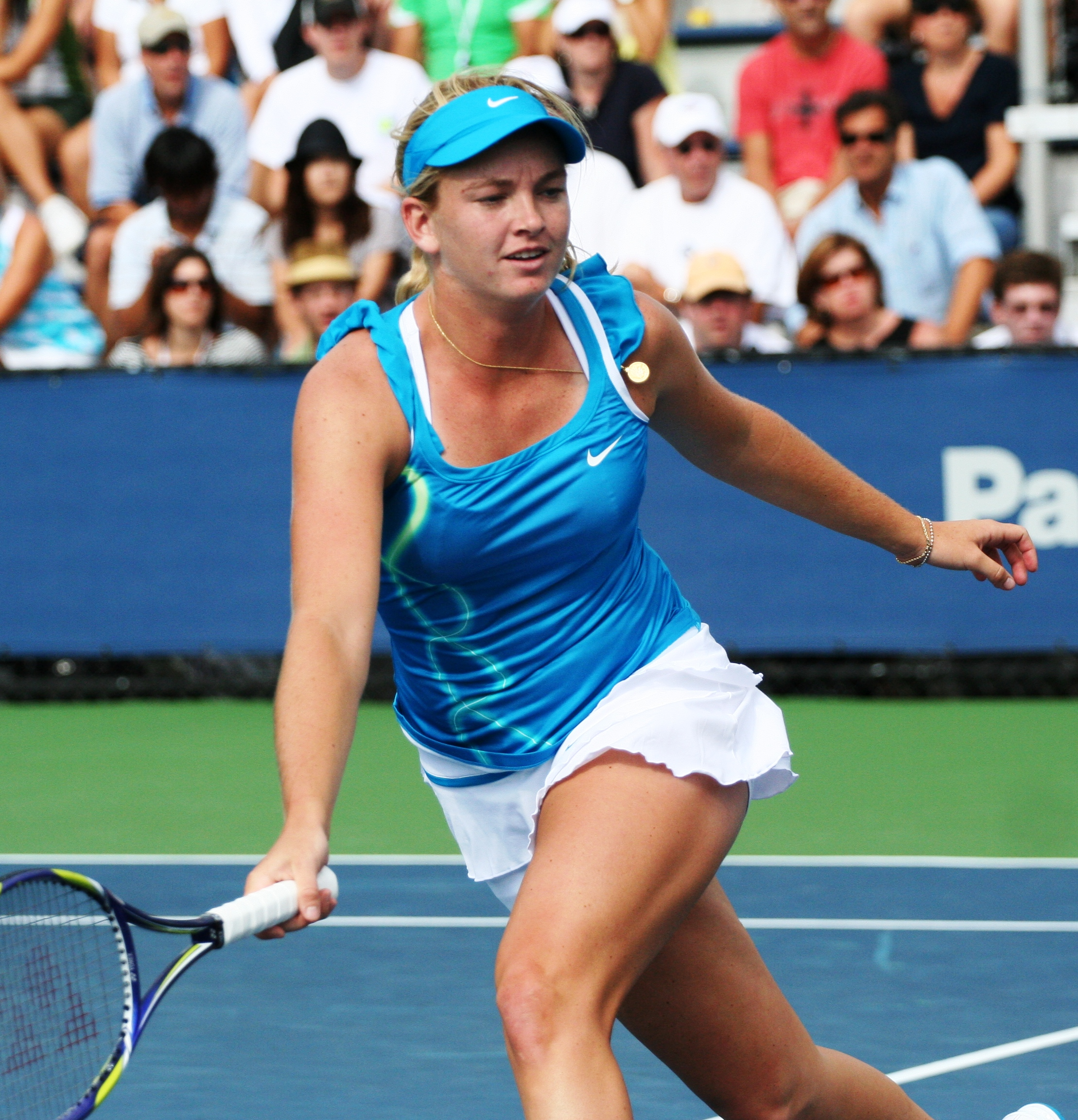
Vandeweghe at 2010 US Open

In 2010, Vandeweghe received a wildcard to the Australian Open, but she lost in the first round. In the spring, Vandeweghe won two back-to-back ITF tournaments at Carson and El Paso to see her WTA ranking climb from outside the top 300 to inside the top 200.

At the San Diego Open in August, Vandeweghe made her first deep run at a WTA tournament, beating Gisela Dulko and then Vera Zvonareva for her first top-ten victory. Despite high expectations at the US Open, Vandeweghe lost in the first round to Sabine Lisicki. Vandeweghe finished the year strong by qualifying for the Pan Pacific Open in Tokyo, a Premier 5 tournament. She would then defeat world No. 18, Aravane Rezaï, and eventually make the quarterfinals before losing to Victoria Azarenka.

In 2011, Vandeweghe came through the qualifying rounds at the Australian Open but was knocked out in the first round. Her first significant result of the year came at the U.S. Indoor Championships in Memphis, where she reached the quarterfinals to break into the WTA top 100 for the first time in her career. Towards the end of the season, Vandeweghe won first career match in the main draw of a Grand Slam tournament at the US Open, defeating world No. 56, Alberta Brianti, in the first round.

=== 2012–2013: Lucky loser WTA Tour final ===
Vandeweghe got off to a slow start in the 2012 season but started to gain some momentum in the grass-court season when she reached the final of the $75k event at Nottingham. She followed this up by qualifying for Wimbledon, but she ended up losing the first round. At her next tournament, Vandeweghe entered the main draw of the Stanford Classic as a lucky loser and made it to her first career final. In the semifinal, she upset fifth-seeded Yanina Wickmayer, before falling to top-seeded Serena Williams, in straight sets. She was the first lucky loser to reach a final since Melinda Czink in early 2005 and also rose to a then career-high ranking of No. 69 in the world. Vandeweghe's best result in the rest of the year was a quarterfinal at the Washington Open.

In 2013, she began the season with another slow start. When her ranking fell outside the top 200, she began to rebound by reaching the quarterfinals at the Stanford Classic. Later in the season, Vandeweghe was able to qualify for the US Open and beat another qualifier in the first round to lift her ranking back closer to the top 100.

=== 2014: Top 50, first WTA Tour title ===
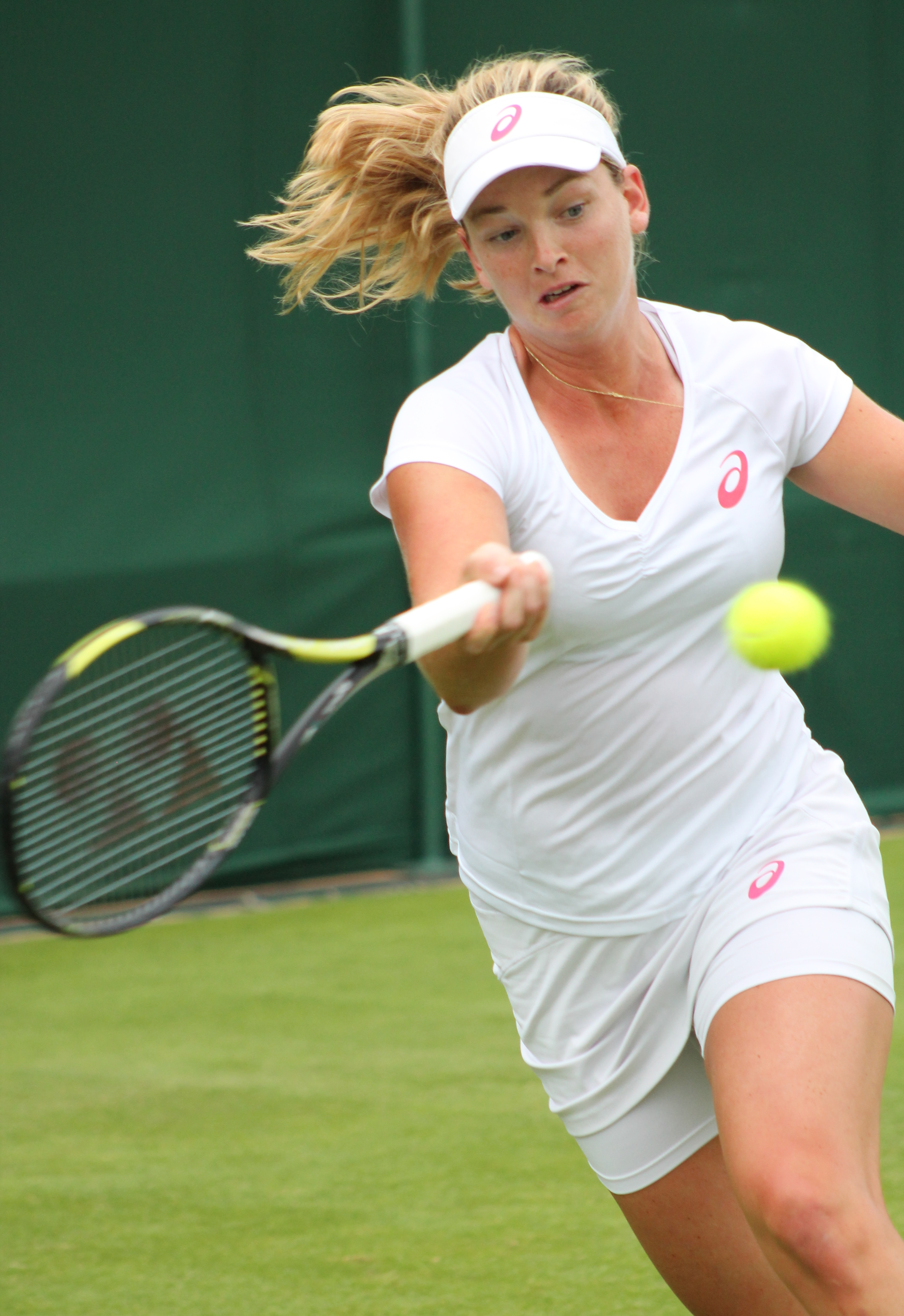
Vandeweghe 2014

Vandeweghe commenced her 2014 season at Auckland, where she was the top seed in the qualifying rounds. She beat Valeria Solovyeva and Irena Pavlovic in straight sets before losing to Kristýna Plíšková in three sets. Her next tournament was the Australian Open where she was seeded second in qualifying but lost to Anastasia Rodionova in straight sets. Given a wildcard into the Indian Wells Open, Vandeweghe earned her first WTA singles win of the year, beating Alexandra Cadanțu 6–4, 6–0 before losing to eighth seed Petra Kvitová 1–6, 3–6. Her next event was in Miami, where she qualified for the main draw with two set wins over Alison Van Uytvanck and Sharon Fichman. There, Vandeweghe beat Marina Erakovic, Anastasia Pavlyuchenkova, and Samantha Stosur before losing to eventual champion Serena Williams in the fourth round. With a strong showing in Miami, she reached a career-high ranking of No. 82. Next, she participated at the Monterrey Open before losing to Caroline Wozniacki in two close sets. At the French Open, Vandeweghe won her first-round match for the first time in Paris, beating Iveta Benešová in straight sets before losing to Ekaterina Makarova in the second round.

Vandeweghe had a remarkable grass-court season. At the Birmingham Classic, she beat Zarina Diyas and Yanina Wickmayer, before losing to Klára Koukalová in three very close sets, despite serving 18 aces. At the Topshelf Open, Vandeweghe won her first WTA singles title. Seeded second in qualifying, she beat Nicole Melichar and Kristina Mladenovic. In the main draw, Vendeweghe beat Marina Erakovic, Vania King, Garbiñe Muguruza, Klára Koukalová in the semifinals, and Zheng Jie in the final. During that impressive week, she hit a total of 81 aces and rose to a career-high ranking of No. 51. In Wimbledon, a few days later, Vendeweghe beat Muguruza again in three sets, extending her winning streak to eight matches won. She lost to Tereza Smitková in the second round.

Her next event was the Stanford Classic, where she made the final in 2012 as a lucky loser. She made the second round with a comfortable win against fellow American Kristie Ahn before losing to third seed Angelique Kerber. Vandeweghe went on to reach her first quarterfinal at a Premier-5 event at the Rogers Cup. She quickly qualified for the main draw, dropping just five games in the qualifying rounds. In the first round, Vandeweghe beat Timea Bacsinszky 6–1, 6–2. She drew Ana Ivanovic in the second round, where she won in three tight sets. She then went on to beat Jelena Janković in three sets in the third round, before losing to Ekaterina Makarova in the quarterfinals in three sets. After Montréal, her ranking rose to No. 38 and entered the top 40 for the first time in her career. In the Connecticut Open, she lost in straight sets to Camila Giorgi, and at the US Open, she made the second round for the third time. She beat Donna Vekić 2–6, 6–3, 6–1 but lost in straight sets to Carla Suárez Navarro.

After the US Open, her next tournament was the Pan Pacific Open. Vandeweghe beat Alla Kudryavtseva in the first round, before losing to Dominika Cibulková in two close sets. She made the second round of Wuhan, the first round of Beijing, and the second round of Osaka to end her best season to date. She finished 2014, ranked No. 39.

=== 2015: Steady ranking, first Grand Slam quarterfinal ===
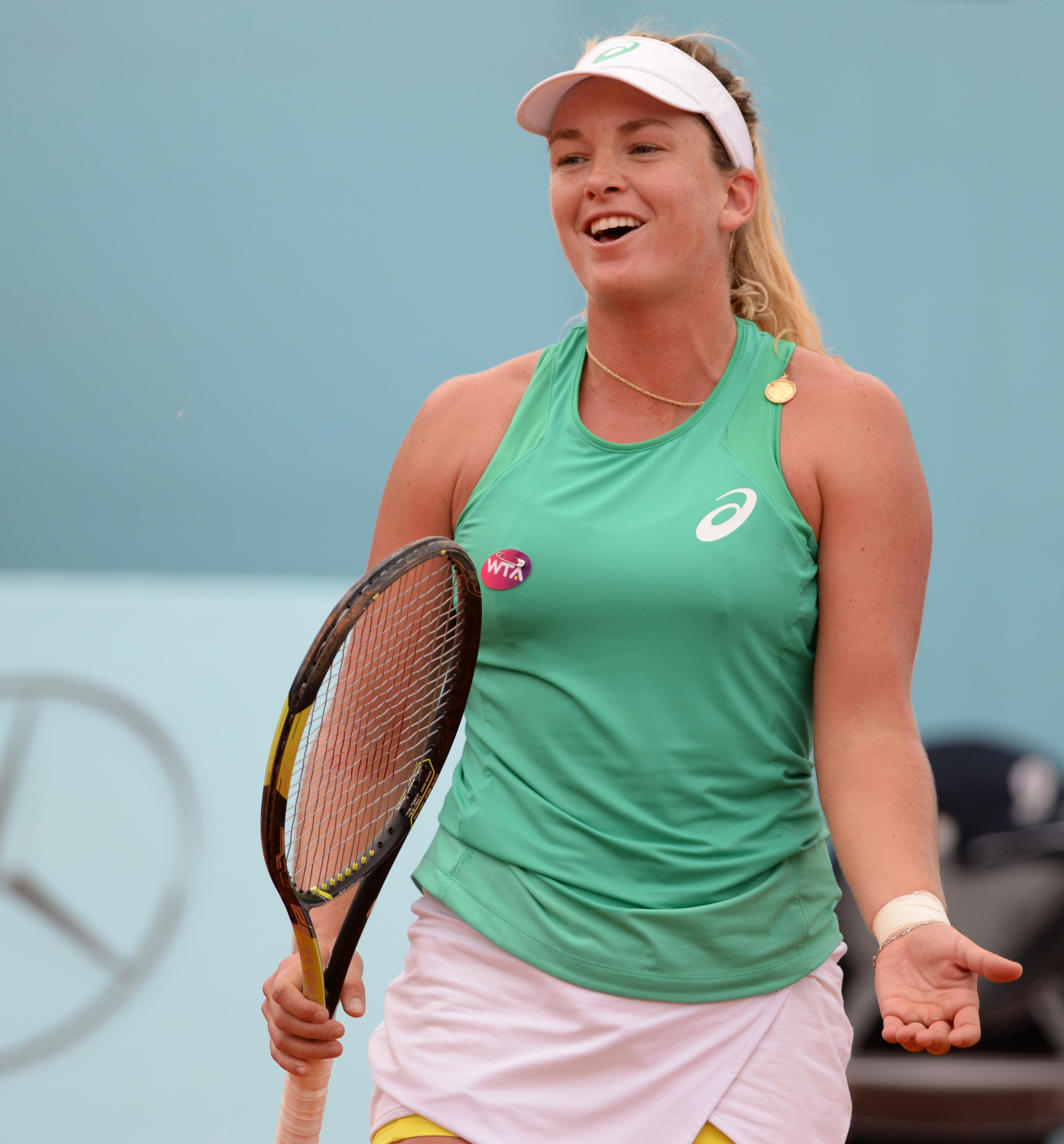
CoCo Vandeweghe, 2015

Vandeweghe achieved her best Grand Slam result at the Australian Open, where she made the third round for the first time after victories over Francesca Schiavone and Samantha Stosur, falling to Madison Brengle.

In 2015, just three days before the French Open, Vandeweghe and coach Maciej Synowka parted ways, having worked with each other for over a year. Vandeweghe is now coached by Craig Kardon, who has previously worked with star players like Martina Navratilova, Lindsay Davenport, Jennifer Capriati, and Ana Ivanovic.

She upgraded her best result at a Grand Slam tournament in Wimbledon, when she made the quarterfinals after victories over Anna Karolína Schmiedlová, 11th seeded Karolína Plíšková, 22nd seeded Samantha Stosur, and sixth-seeded Lucie Šafářová before falling in three sets to fourth-seeded Maria Sharapova.

She made her first major semifinals in doubles with Anna-Lena Grönefeld at the US Open.

=== 2016: Second career singles title, first doubles title ===
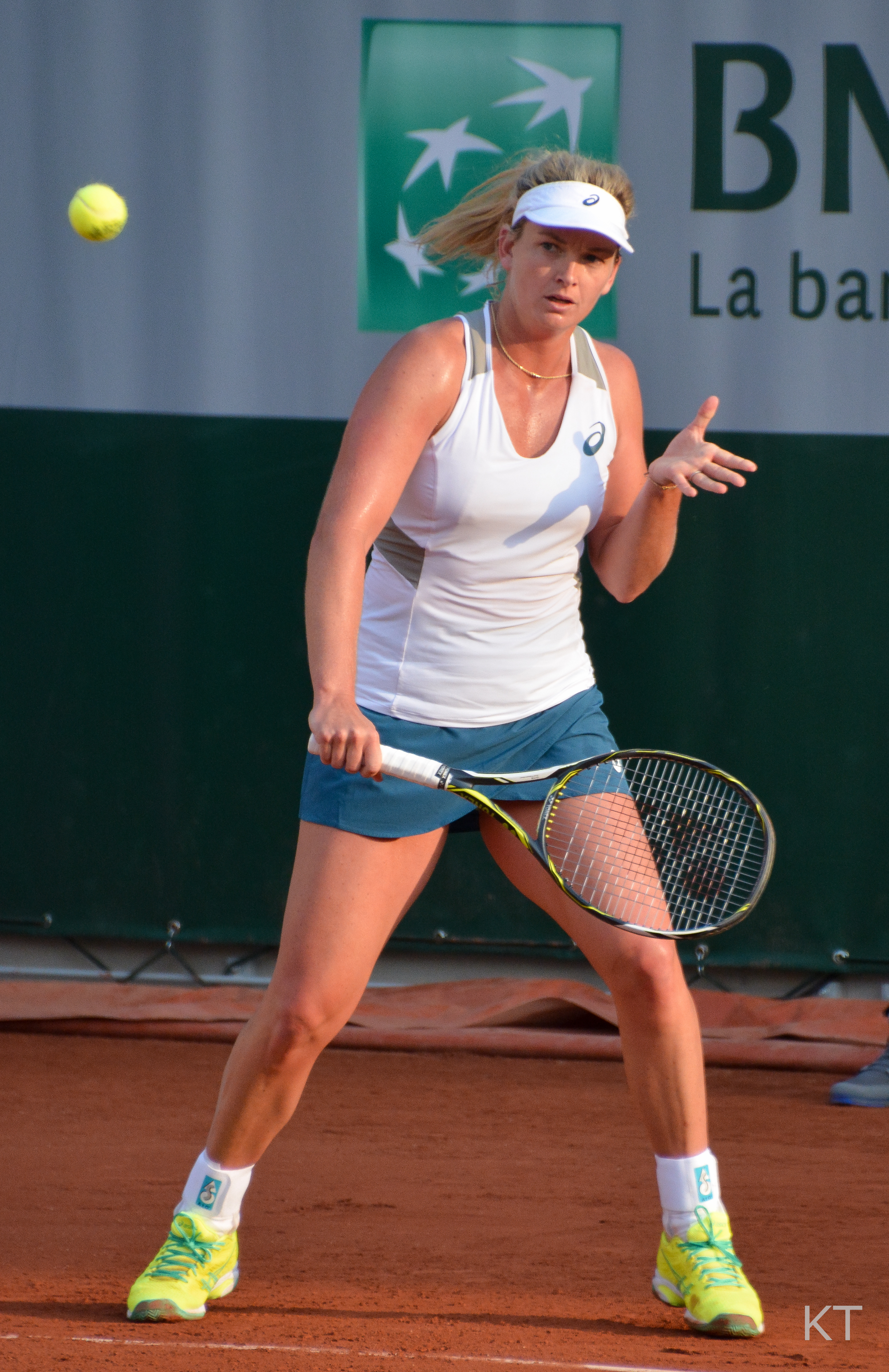
CoCo Vandeweghe at the 2016 French Open

Vandeweghe got off to a rough start in 2016. She commenced her season at the Auckland Open, where she was the seventh seed but lost to her compatriot and good friend Irina Falconi in the first round 7–5, 4–6, 3–6, despite being up a break in the final set. An alternate for Sydney, Vandeweghe lost in the first round to Jelena Janković 3–6, 4–6. She then traveled to Melbourne to compete at the 2016 Australian Open, where she drew her countrywoman Madison Brengle in the first round, again losing 3–6, 4–6. However, Vandeweghe enjoyed some success in women's doubles, where she and her partner, Anna-Lena Grönefeld, reached the quarterfinals and losing to world number ones Sania Mirza and Martina Hingis in three sets. Vandeweghe teamed up with Romania's Horia Tecău in the mixed doubles event where they made the final, falling just short to Elena Vesnina and Bruno Soares.

After the Australian Open, Vandeweghe participated at Dubai Championships, where she scored her first win of 2016, knocking out the sixth seed Karolína Plíšková. She went on to reach the quarterfinals of Dubai, with another strong win over Kristina Mladenovic, before losing to Elina Svitolina in three sets. At the Qatar Open, Vandeweghe made it to the third round, with straight-set wins over Kirsten Flipkens and Belinda Bencic, obtaining her first top-ten victory of 2016.

In March, Vandeweghe made the third round at Indian Wells, beating Kiki Bertens and Svetlana Kuznetsova before losing to Jelena Janković for the second time in 2016. In doubles, Vandeweghe teamed up with fellow American Bethanie Mattek-Sands, where they unprecedentedly claimed the doubles title. En route to the title, they beat Dabrowski/Martínez Sánchez, the second seeds Chan/Chan, the eighth seeds Spears/Atawo, the third seeds Babos/Shvedova in the semifinals, and Görges/Plíšková in the final. It was Vandeweghe's first doubles title. She participated at the Miami Open, where she also reached the third round after defeating Samantha Crawford and world No. 6, Carla Suárez Navarro, before losing to Monica Niculescu in straight sets.

Vandeweghe traveled to Brisbane, where she represented the US at Fed Cup. Her decisive win over Samantha Stosur meant that the U.S. team would return to World Group stages in 2017. After Fed Cup, Vandeweghe lost in the first rounds of Madrid and Rome. At the French Open, she won her first clay-court match of the season, beating Naomi Broady in three sets. In her round two match, she faced Irina-Camelia Begu, where she lost in 3 hours and 37 minutes despite serving for the match. In mixed doubles, Vandeweghe paired up with Bob Bryan. They reached the quarterfinals, where they lost to French duo Kristina Mladenovic and Pierre-Hugues Herbert.

Vandeweghe found form in the grass-court season. She won her second WTA title at the Rosmalen Open. She beat Indy de Vroome, Nao Hibino, Evgeniya Rodina, Madison Brengle, and finally, Kristina Mladenovic, 7–5, 7–5, to win the title. It was her second title overall, and the second title at the Rosmalen Open, having won the tournament in 2014.

She then played at the Birmingham Classic, where she beat world No. 3 and top seed Agnieszka Radwańska, Christina McHale and Yanina Wickmayer, before losing to Barbora Strýcová and thus ending her eight-match winning streak. After this tournament, her ranking rose to a career-high of No. 30. At the Wimbledon Championships, Vandeweghe was seeded at a Grand Slam tournament for the first time as No. 27. She made the second week for the second straight year. She beat Bondarenko, Babos, and sixth-seeded Vinci before losing to eventual quarterfinalist and 21st seed Anastasia Pavlyuchenkova in the fourth round. Her win over Vinci was her fourth top-ten victory in 2016.

Vandeweghe struggled for the remainder of the 2016 season, registering just two more wins; over Nicole Gibbs in Stanford at the Bank of the West Classic, where she was the fourth seed, and over Sara Errani in Cincinnati.

=== 2017: Top 10 breakthrough, steady results at the majors, Fed Cup crown ===
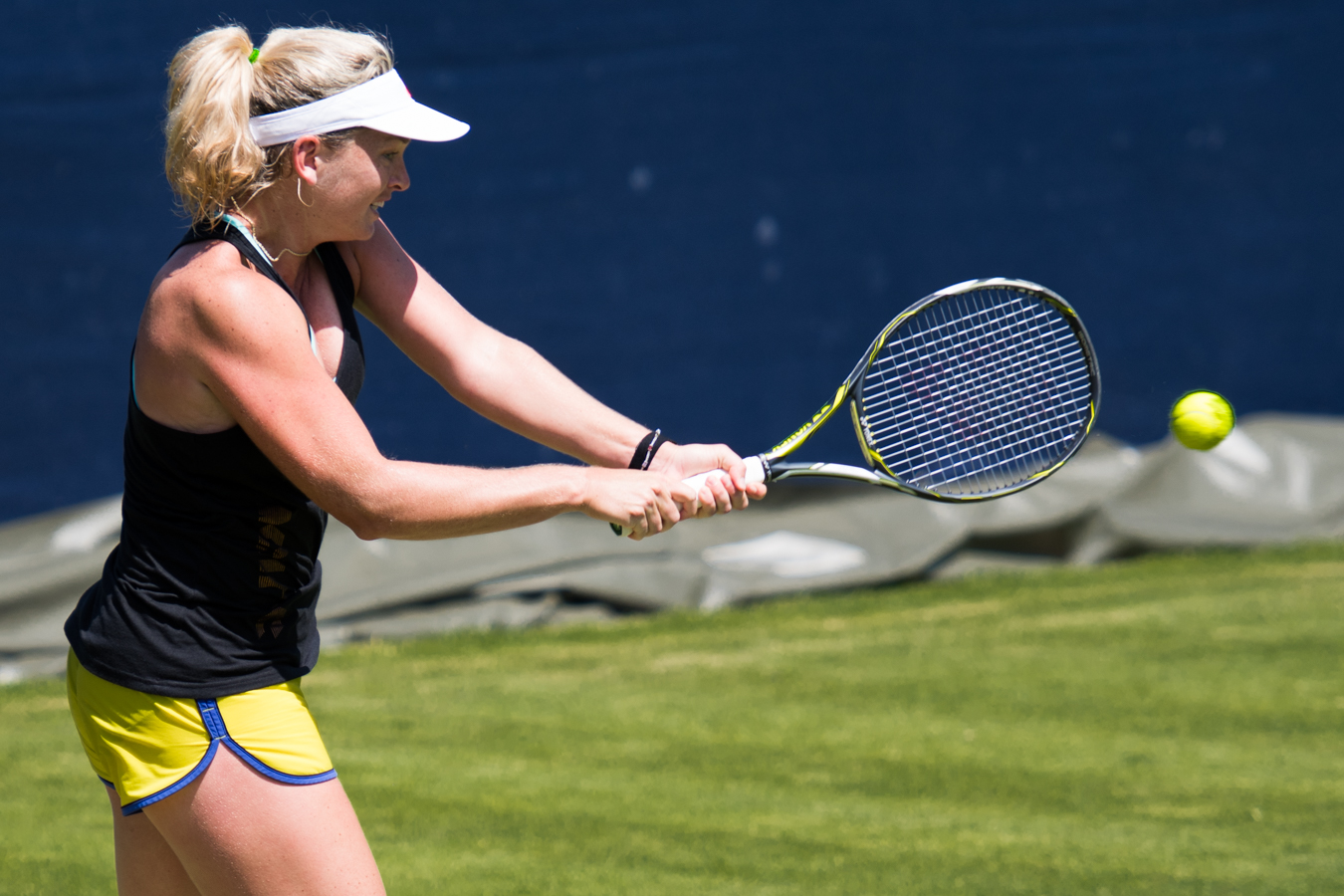
CoCo Vandeweghe, 2017

At the Australian Open, Vandeweghe easily defeated 15th seed Roberta Vinci in the first round 6–1, 7–6. After cruising through her match against Pauline Parmentier, Vandeweghe battled to defeat the 2014 Wimbledon finalist Eugenie Bouchard in three tight sets. In the fourth round, she pulled off the biggest upset of the tournament as she defeated defending champion and world No. 1 Angelique Kerber in straight sets. This victory, her first against a No. 1 player, advanced Vandeweghe to her first quarterfinal at the Australian Open and only her second quarterfinal at a Grand Slam tournament, the first being at Wimbledon in 2015. She then defeated seventh seed Garbiñe Muguruza in straight sets to advance to her first-ever semifinal of a Grand Slam, where she went head-to-head with the 2003 finalist Venus Williams. Despite winning the first set in a tiebreak and delivering a brilliant performance, Vandeweghe was defeated by Williams 7–6, 2–6, 3–6, who spoke brightly of Vandeweghe following the match. Vandeweghe also became the fourth North American woman other than the Williams sisters to make the semifinals at an Australian Open in five years, following Sloane Stephens (2013), Bouchard (2014), and Madison Keys (2015). Following the tournament, Vandeweghe rose into the top 20 for the first time in her career. Seeded 19th at the French Open, she lost in the first round to Magdaléna Rybáriková.

At the Wimbledon Championships, Vandeweghe was seeded 24th. She beat Mona Barthel in straight sets in the first round, then continued with straight-set victories over Tatjana Maria and American compatriot Alison Riske. She then defeated fifth seed Caroline Wozniacki in the fourth round, advancing to the quarterfinals for the second time in three years. Rybárikova defeated her in the quarterfinals in straight sets, the second straight major she was beaten by the Slovak. At the Stanford Classic, Vandeweghe reached the final for the third time, where she lost to fellow American Madison Keys.

Seeded 20th at the US Open, Vandeweghe recovered from a set down to beat compatriot Alison Riske in the first round then conquered Ons Jabeur for her first victory on Arthur Ashe stadium and to advance to the third round of the US Open for the first time in her career. She then defeated tenth seed Agnieszka Radwańska in three tight sets followed by a victory over 2015 French Open finalist Lucie Šafářová to reach her third Grand Slam quarterfinal of the year, where she stunned top seed and world No. 1, Karolina Plisková in straight sets to advance to her second major semifinal, where Keys defeated her, thus being denied of the chance to reach her first Grand Slam final. Following the tournament, Vandeweghe rose to a career-high ranking of No. 16. She concluded the season by reaching the final of the Elite Trophy in Zhuhai. This result helped her break into the top 10 for the first time, ending the season as No. 10.

=== 2018: Out of top 100 in singles, US Open doubles title ===
At the Australian Open, Vandeweghe was eliminated in the first round by the Hungarian Tímea Babos. During the match, she was warned for delaying the start of the second set while she demanded that a banana be delivered to the court. Towards the end of the match, she was penalized a point for shouting expletives at her opponent. She was later fined $10,000. The incident generated controversy in the press and on social media with tennis fans calling Vandeweghe's actions on the court "disgusting." Vandeweghe's on-court behavior has been criticized in the past.

Shortly after, Vandeweghe revealed that she had suffered from a severe virus during the Australian Open and was ordered by her doctor to limit her travel, due to recovery. She withdrew from the Qatar Open in Doha. Vandeweghe returned to the tour at the Indian Wells Open and was eliminated in the singles draw. At Miami, she lost her first-round match in the singles draw, but she entered the doubles with Ashleigh Barty for the first time. The pair won their first doubles title together, with notable wins over fourth-seeded Tímea Babos and Kristina Mladenovic in the first round, top-seeded Ekaterina Makarova and Elena Vesnina in the semifinal, and second-seeded Barbora Krejciková and Kateřina Siniaková in the final.

During the clay-court season, Vandeweghe reached the final at the Porsche Tennis Grand Prix, where she lost to Karolina Plisková. Early elimination in the Madrid Open and Italian Open followed. At the French Open, she reached the second round.

The grass tournaments before Wimbledon showed the same results as the clay season. Vandeweghe reached the semifinals in 's-Hertogenbosch before she lost to the eventual champion Aleksandra Krunić. An early defeat in Nottingham to Petra Martić followed. At Wimbledon, Vandeweghe was defeated by Kateřina Siniaková in three sets, but worse was that she injured her right ankle during the match. The injury meant that Vandeweghe and Barty had to withdraw from the doubles competition, and she was sidelined during the US Open Series.

Vandeweghe made her comeback at the Western & Southern in Cincinnati and had another defeat. To get more matches before the US Open, Vandeweghe received a wildcard for the Connecticut Open. She met Rybariková in the first round and was forced to retire from the match in the third set with pain in her injured ankle.

At the US Open, Vandeweghe was defeated in singles by Kirsten Flipkens. But the US Open became a turning point for Vandeweghe when she and Ashleigh Barty made a big surprise by winning their first Grand Slam title in doubles. On their way to the final, the pair won their matches in two sets, including notable wins over third-seeded Andrea Sestini Hlavacková and Barbora Strýcová in the third round and top-seeded Krejciková and Siniaková. In the final, they defeated second-seeded Tímea Babos and Kristina Mladenovic, in three sets. Vandeweghe and Barty held three championship points in the third set before they converted it on a double fault from the serve of Mladenovic.

=== 2019: Rehab from injury and comeback ===
At the beginning of 2019, Vandeweghe was forced to withdraw from several tournaments, including the Australian Open, due to injury. Shortly after, she published a video on her social profile accounts how serious her ankle injury was. The ankle injury had plagued her since Wimbledon 2018 and kept her out through the early hardcourt season, as well as the entire clay and grass-court seasons, including the French Open and Wimbledon.

Vandeweghe made her return in the end of July at the Silicon Valley Classic in San Jose, where she was awarded a wild card. At this point, her singles ranking had dropped to No. 636 in the world, having not played a tournament in ten months. She defeated the young Czech Marie Bouzková in the first round to record her first match win since June 2018. Vandeweghe revealed after her comeback match that her ankle problem was diagnosed as Complex Regional Pain Syndrome, a nervous disease in the system which occurs after an injury. Vandeweghe also added what she went through after the nerves had calmed down. She was defeated by second seed and world No. 10, Aryna Sabalenka, in the second round. In August, she reached the doubles semifinals at the Western & Southern Open with Bethanie Mattek-Sands.

Vandeweghe made her first ITF final of 2019 in September at the Central Coast Pro Tennis Open, which is a $60k level event. She fell to fellow American Shelby Rogers, in three sets. In November, she made the final at the Houston Challenger, a WTA 125 event. This final was her biggest since her return from injury but she fell to Kirsten Flipkens in two tight sets.

=== 2021–22: First singles semifinal in three years ===
Vandeweghe reached her first semifinal as a qualifier at the 2021 Birmingham Classic in three years since the 2018 Rosmalen Open. She defeated Kristýna Plíšková for her first WTA Tour level main-draw win since July 2019, then overcame Ajla Tomljanović and eighth seed Marie Bouzková, before losing to fourth seed Daria Kasatkina.

Entering using her protected ranking, she defeated qualifier Olga Govortsova to reach the second round at the 2021 Wimbledon Championships, where she lost to Kateřina Siniaková.

Vandeweghe made the main-draw at the 2022 Wimbledon Championships as a lucky loser after Madison Keys' withdrawal, but lost to 17th seed and eventual champion Elena Rybakina in the first round.

=== 2023: Retirement ===
Ranked No. 136 at the inaugural ATX Open, she reached the main draw as lucky loser and won her first-round match against Robin Montgomery, before losing to Anna Kalinskaya.

In August, Vandeweghe announced her impending retirement from professional tennis. She played in her final tournament the following month at the San Diego Open, where she teamed with Danielle Collins in the doubles, reaching the final, which they lost to Barbora Krejčíková and Kateřina Siniaková.

== World TeamTennis ==
Vandeweghe has played ten seasons with World TeamTennis, making her debut in 2009 with the Sacramento Capitals. She played with the Capitals another year in 2012, and has since played for the Boston Lobsters in 2010 and 2011, the Orange County Breakers in 2013, the Philadelphia Freedoms in 2015 and 2016, and the San Diego Aviators 2017–2019. It was announced she will be joining the San Diego Aviators during the 2020 WTT season set to begin July 12.

She partnered with Nicole Melichar in women's doubles for the San Diego Aviators during the 2020 WTT season. Both players were traded to the New York Empires more than halfway through the season. The Empires would ultimately win the 2020 WTT Championship in a Supertiebreaker over the Chicago Smash with a return winner and she would be named the MVP of the 2020 WTT Finals.

== Career statistics ==
=== Grand Slam performance timelines ===
Key
W	F	SF	QF	#R	RR	Q#	DNQ	A	NH

(W) winner; (F) finalist; (SF) semifinalist; (QF) quarterfinalist; (#R) rounds 4, 3, 2, 1; (RR) round-robin stage; (Q#) qualification round; (DNQ) did not qualify; (A) absent; (NH) not held; (SR) strike rate (events won / competed); (W–L) win–loss record.
To avoid confusion and double counting, these charts are updated at the conclusion of a tournament or when the player's participation has ended.

==== Singles ====
Tournament	2007	2008	2009	2010	2011	2012	2013	2014	2015	2016	2017	2018	2019	2020	2021	2022	2023	SR	W–L	Win %
Australian Open	A	A	A	1R	1R	Q1	1R	Q1	3R	1R	SF	1R	A	1R	A	Q1	1R	0 / 9	7–9	44%
French Open	A	A	A	A	1R	Q2	1R	2R	1R	2R	1R	2R	A	A	Q2	Q1	Q1	0 / 7	3–7	30%
Wimbledon	A	A	A	A	1R	1R	1R	2R	QF	4R	QF	1R	A	NH	2R	1R	Q3	0 / 10	13–10	57%
US Open	Q1	1R	Q1	1R	2R	1R	2R	2R	2R	1R	SF	1R	1R	A	1R	1R	Q1	0 / 13	9–13	41%
Win–loss	0–0	0–1	0–0	0–2	1–4	0–2	1–4	3–3	7–4	4–4	14–4	1–4	0–1	0–1	1–2	0–2	0–1	0 / 39	32–39	45%

==== Doubles ====
Tournament	2008	2009	2010	2011	2012	2013	2014	2015	2016	2017	2018	2019	2020	2021	2022	2023	SR	W–L	Win %
Australian Open	A	A	A	A	A	A	A	1R	QF	2R	1R	A	A	A	A	A	0 / 4	3–4	43%
French Open	A	A	A	1R	A	A	A	1R	2R	1R	1R	A	A	1R	A	A	0 / 6	1–6	14%
Wimbledon	A	A	A	A	A	A	A	3R	A	1R	A	A	NH	1R	3R	A	0 / 4	4–4	50%
US Open	1R	A	2R	A	A	2R	2R	SF	SF	1R	W	1R	A	1R	1R	1R	1 / 12	17–11	61%
Win–loss	0–1	0–0	1–1	0–1	0–0	1–1	1–1	6–4	7–3	1–4	6–2	0–1	0–0	0–3	2–2	0–1	1 / 26	25–25	50%

==== Mixed doubles ====
Tournament	2011	...	2016	2017	2018	2019	2020	2021	2022	SR	W–L	Win %
Australian Open	A		F	A	A	A	A	A	A	0 / 1	3–1	75%
French Open	A		QF	1R	1R	A	NH	A	A	0 / 3	2–3	40%
Wimbledon	A		2R	A	A	A	NH	A	A	0 / 1	0–1	0%
US Open	1R		F	SF	A	1R	NH	A	A	0 / 4	7–4	64%
Win–loss	0–1		9–4	3–2	0–1	0–1	0–0	0–0	0–0	0 / 9	12–9	57%

=== Grand Slam tournament finals ===
==== Doubles: 1 (title) ====
Result	Year	Championship	Surface	Partner	Opponents	Score
Win	2018	US Open	Hard	(Australia) Ashleigh Barty	(Hungary) Tímea Babos (France) Kristina Mladenovic	3–6, 7–6^{(7–2)}, 7–6^{(8–6)}

==== Mixed doubles: 2 (2 runner-ups) ====
Result	Year	Championship	Surface	Partner	Opponents	Score
Loss	2016	Australian Open	Hard	(Romania) Horia Tecău	(Russia) Elena Vesnina (Brazil) Bruno Soares	4–6, 6–4, [5–10]
Loss	2016	US Open	Hard	(United States) Rajeev Ram	(Germany) Laura Siegemund (Croatia) Mate Pavić	4–6, 4–6
