= Diane Edelijn =

Dutch swimmer (born 1960)

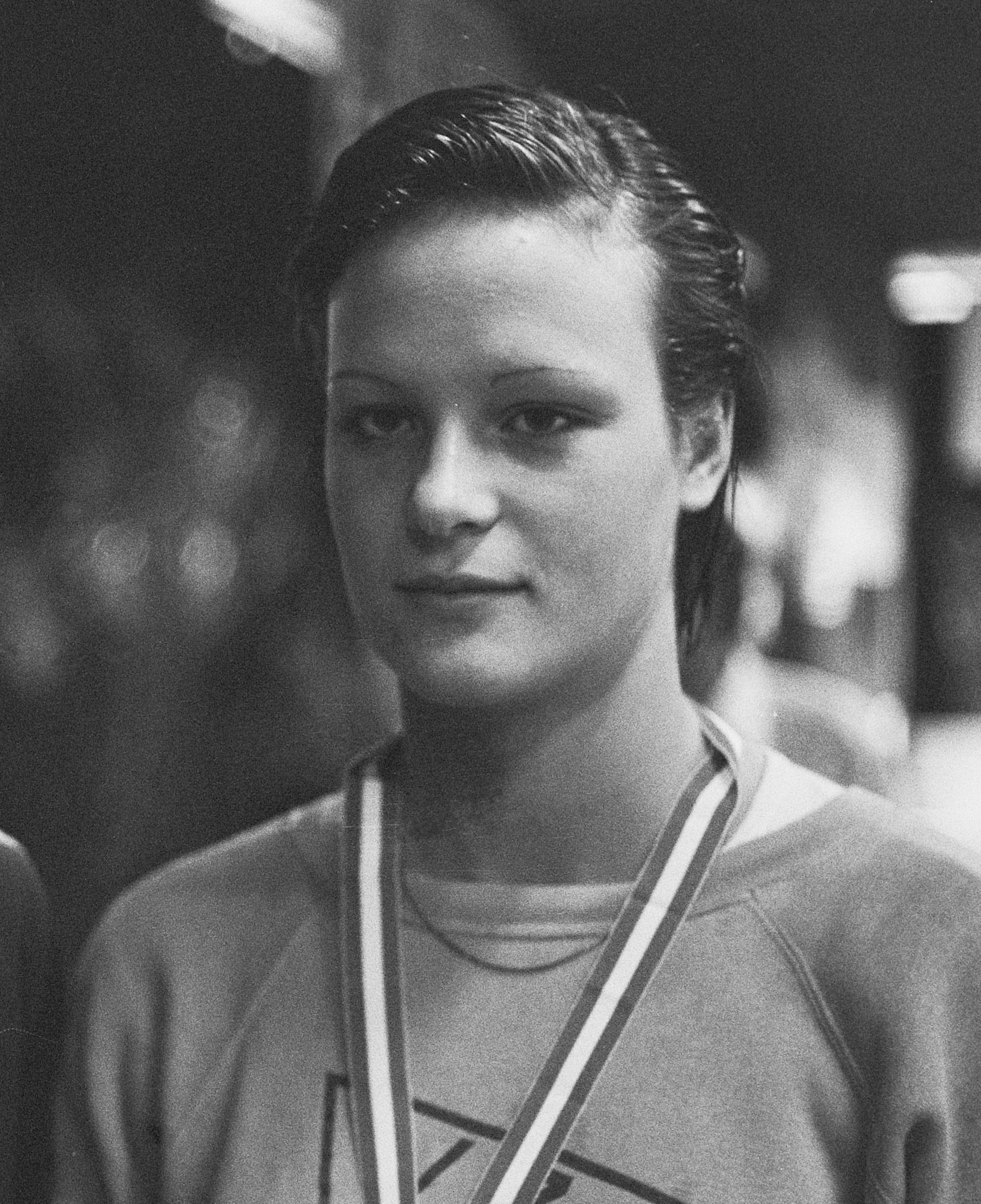
- Diane Edelijn in 1977

Personal information
- Born: June 12, 1960 (age 66) Rotterdam, Netherlands

Sport
- Sport: Swimming
- Strokes: Backstroke

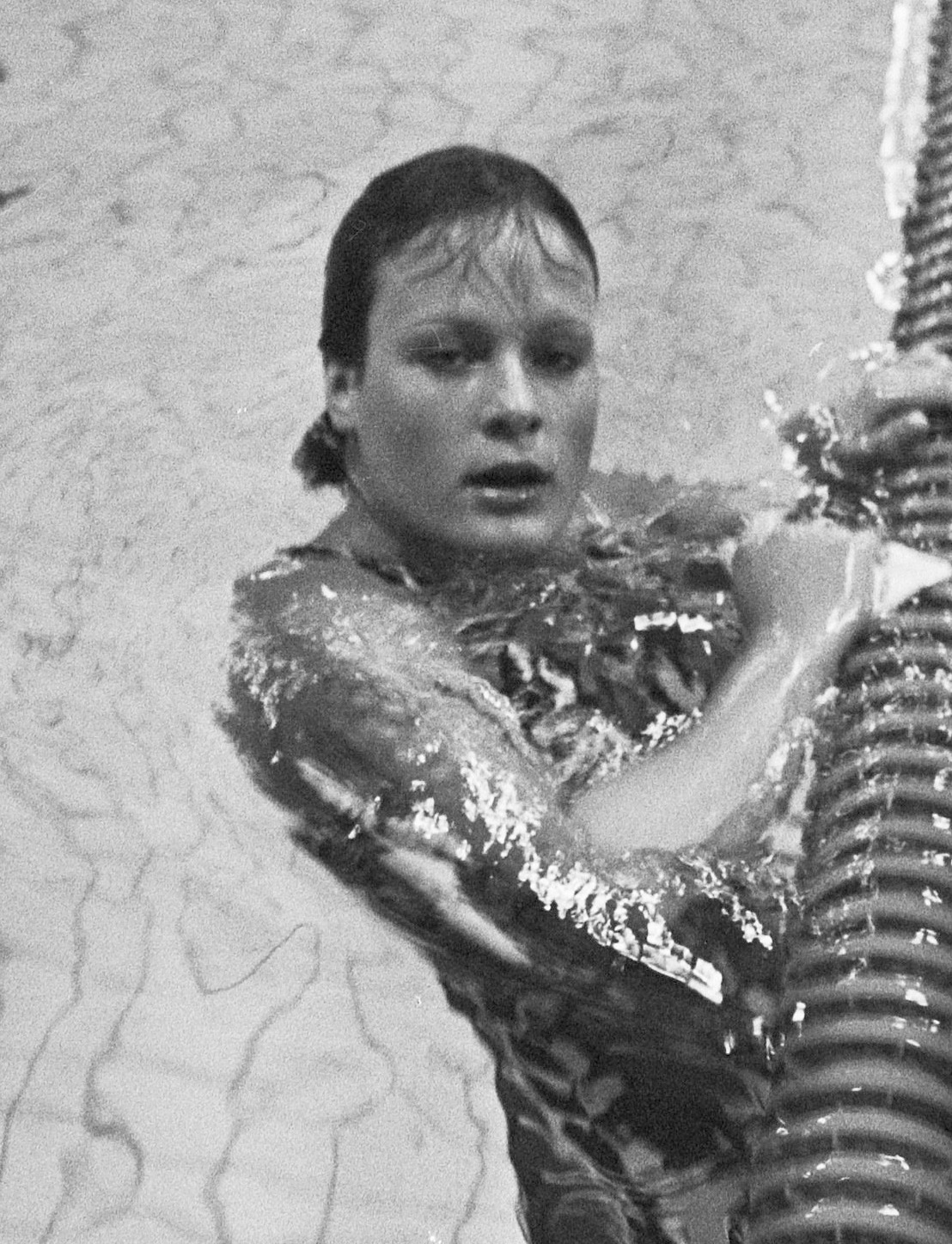
Diane Edelijn in 1977

Diane Hendrina Edelijn (born 12 June 1960) is a former backstroke swimmer from the Netherlands, who competed for her native country at the 1976 Summer Olympics in Montreal, Quebec, Canada. There, she finished in eighth position in the 100m backstroke, while she was eliminated in the third heat of the 200m backstroke. With the Dutch relay team, Edelijn ended up in fifth place in the 4 × 100 m medley, alongside Wijda Mazereeuw (breaststroke), José Damen (butterfly), and Enith Brigitha (freestyle).
