= Ulrike Richter =

East German swimmer

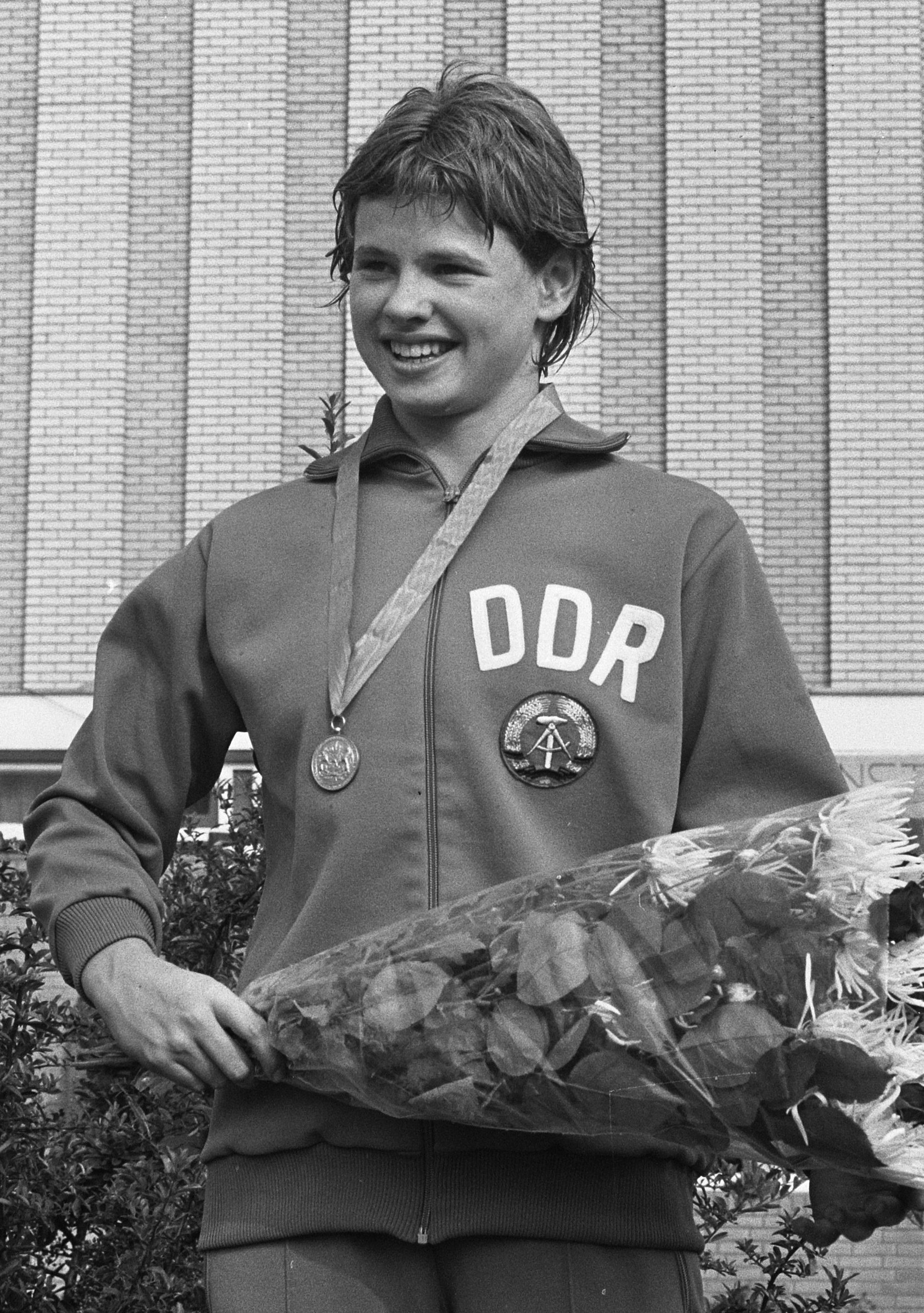
- Ulrike Richter in 1973

Personal information
- Nationality: East German
- Born: 17 June 1959 (age 67) Görlitz, Saxony, East Germany (now Germany)
- Height: 1.73 m (5 ft 8 in)
- Weight: 66 kg (146 lb)

Sport
- Sport: Swimming
- Strokes: Backstroke
- Club: SC Einheit Dresden
Medal record
Women's swimming
Representing East Germany
Summer Olympics
| Gold medal – first place | 1976 Montreal | 100 m backstroke |
| Gold medal – first place | 1976 Montreal | 200 m backstroke |
| Gold medal – first place | 1976 Montreal | 4×100 m medley |
World Championships
| Gold medal – first place | 1973 Belgrade | 100 m backstroke |
| Gold medal – first place | 1973 Belgrade | 4×100 m medley |
| Gold medal – first place | 1975 Cali | 100 m backstroke |
| Gold medal – first place | 1975 Cali | 4×100 m medley |
| Bronze medal – third place | 1975 Cali | 200 m backstroke |
European Championships
| Gold medal – first place | 1974 Vienna | 100 m backstroke |
| Gold medal – first place | 1974 Vienna | 200 m backstroke |
| Gold medal – first place | 1974 Vienna | 4×100 m medley |
| Gold medal – first place | 1977 Jönköping | 4×100 m medley |
| Silver medal – second place | 1977 Jönköping | 100 m backstroke |
| Silver medal – second place | 1977 Jönköping | 200 m backstroke |

Ulrike Richter (later Schmidt, born 17 June 1959) is a German former swimmer who competed for East Germany in the 1970s. At the 1976 Olympic Games in Montreal she won three gold medals. She received two gold medals at the 1973 World Aquatics Championships, and two in 1975. Richter set 14 world records during her career, in 100 m backstroke, 200 m backstroke, and medley relay. She was inducted into the International Swimming Hall of Fame in Fort Lauderdale, Florida in 1983.

== Doping ==
Officials from the East German team have confessed that they administered performance-enhancing drugs to Richter during her career.

== See also ==
- List of members of the International Swimming Hall of Fame
