= Gabriella Verrasztó =

Hungarian swimmer

Personal information
- Nationality: Hungarian
- Born: 25 October 1961 (age 64) Budapest, Hungary

Sport
- Sport: Swimming

Gabriella Verrasztó (born 25 October 1961) is a Hungarian former swimmer. She competed in two events at the 1976 Summer Olympics.

Gabriella is a 13 time Hungarian champion swimmer and is part of the national swimmers hall of fame in Hungary.

She started swimming at a young age alongside her brother Zoltán Verrasztó who became an Olympic medalist.

Her competitive swimming career ended at the age of 18 after she contracted brain fever from a virus during a training camp in Spain. She later recovered from the disease.

Gabriella studied at the University of Physical Education of Hungary and graduated in Sports Science and started a career as a swimming coach.

In 1984 she married Hungarian actor and theatre manager Zoltán Zubornyák. Their daughter Barbara was born in 1987.

In 1996 Gabriella got involved in Triathlon and became a successful coach and leader of the National Youth Programme for the sport for many years.

In recent years Gabriella has been coaching swimmers alongside her brother as well as becoming a Pentathlon coach.

Gabriella is also aunt of Evelyn Verrasztó and Dàvid Verrasztó.
