= Pierrette Michel =

Belgian swimmer

Personal information
- Born: 17 March 1962 (age 64) Rocourt, Liège, Belgium

Sport
- Sport: Swimming

Pierrette Michel (born 17 March 1962) is a Belgian former backstroke and medley swimmer. She competed in two events at the 1976 Summer Olympics.
