= Zoltán Zubornyák =

Hungarian actor, theatre manager and director

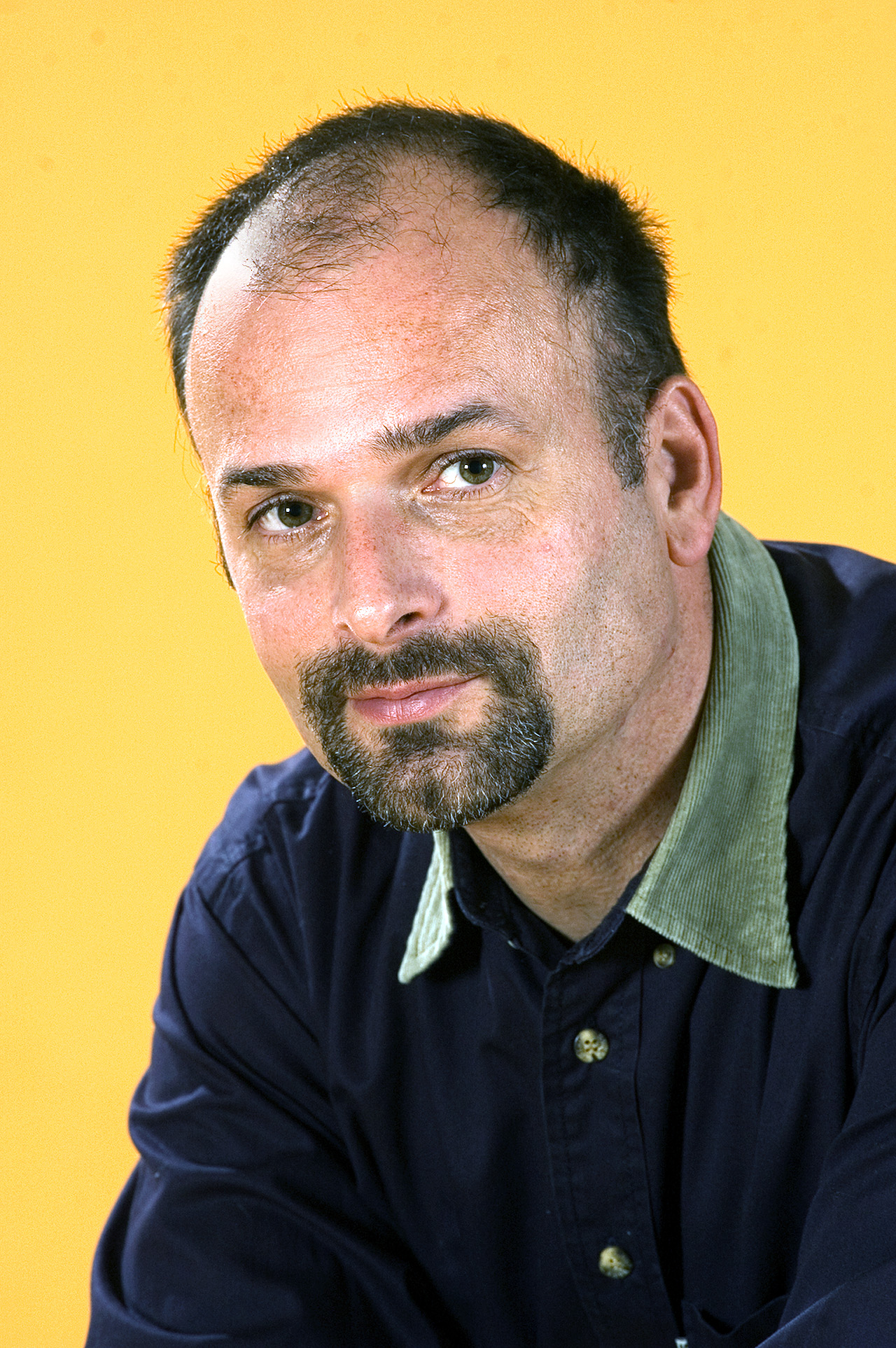
- Zuborbyák in 2006
- Born: 9 September 1961 (age 64); Budapest, Hungarian People's Republic
- Occupation: Actor
- Years active: 1980–present

Zoltán Zubornyák (born 9 September 1961) is a Hungarian actor, culture manager, theatre manager, director, volunteer, and art director.

== Culture manager ==
He has been managing the Ferencváros Cultural Centre, a venue staging numerous pieces; hosting many concerts, alongside exhibitions and various courses, since 2004, for which reason he is also responsible for managing the following institutions:

=== Local History Collection ===
This institution helps gain insight into the history of Ferencváros named after Emperor Francis I on 4 December 1792; collects and processes written material that still exists, as well as artefacts. The Local Government of Ferencváros purchased an apartment located in a building under Pipa Street 4 back in 1997, which was transformed and made suitable for storing the material collected up till this point, as well as for organising exhibitions.

=== József Attila Memorial Place ===
The great Hungarian and European poet Attila József was born in Ferencváros. A memorial room was set up in his honour and to commemorate the poet at Gát Street 3, where visitors had the opportunity to gain insight into the life and works of the poet. However, this space proved insufficient, which is why the management of the institution – hand in hand with the Local Government of the 9th District – set up this exhibition in a space double its original size and also extended its contents, which was ceremoniously opened on 11 April 2002, the Day of Poetry.

=== Ferencváros Pince Gallery ===
This Gallery was opened in 1967 pursuant to the efforts of Zoltán Xantus. According to the intentions of the official cultural policy of this era, the Gallery assumed a sort of vent function in the cultural life of Budapest. As a substitute for the blacklisted Industrial Plan exhibitions, this is where the upcoming generation of young artists had the opportunity to organise their exhibitions dubbed avant-garde. Exhibitions are organised at this Gallery to this day, which assumes the task of presenting every relevant school of contemporary fine and applied art. Its other key role involves introducing young professional artists making their debut to the audience and the general public. The past 17 years has demonstrated that the concept was indeed a good one, as a result of which the Gallery evolved into a popular and prestigious exhibition hall.

=== Festival of Ferencváros ===
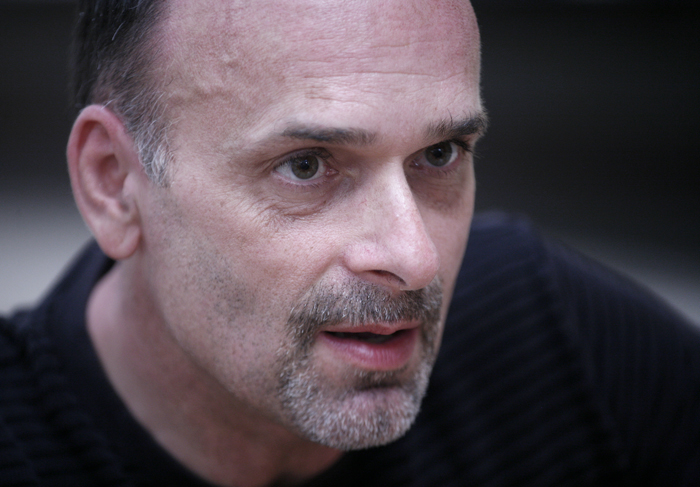
2015, Budapest

Open-air performances were first organised on Bakáts Square in 1993. Various genres of chamber music pieces were staged back then. The audience deemed that these pieces were undoubtedly successful, which was also widely publicised. This excellent reception and exceptional interest shown lead to the idea of launching the summer festival organised each year.

This event has been called Ferencváros Festival of Games since 1994. Initially, the programme mainly featured classical and pop concerts, chamber and symphony orchestra concerts, whilst productions created by other theatre workshops were invited as guest performers on the stage erected. The programme has since become more diverse. Later on, the programme extended to include dance and ballet performances, as well as musical performances specifically designed by the Festival for this space. An all-encompassing performing arts festival eventually unfolded. This programme has been called Ferencváros Festival since 2007.

During the many years of his directorship he designed and directed numerous concerts, theatrical performances, exhibitions, as well as various open-air programmes with the help of my 41 associated employees.

Several tens of thousands of people have visited our exhibitions and around 10,000 people visited the Ferencváros Festival in 2010, whilst each season a total of 10–12,000 people come along to pieces staged at the Pince Theatre (14 pieces per month on average).

== Theatre manager ==
He was the director of Jászai Mari Theatre for 5 years (1996–2001).

=== Pince Theatre ===
In January 2007, Pince Theatre (a small theatre operating from the cellar of a building in the very heart of the city) set the aim of following in the footsteps of the renowned creative workshop that unfolded during the 60s and 70s. The creative and cultural approach of the theatre is represented by chamber plays with one, two or three characters played by famous Hungarian artists. The performances fill a cultural gap in the sense that the majority of these are not staged in big theatres with a regular troupe of actors.

== Cinema manager ==
2012-2014 Coronet Cinema Notting Hill Gate (supervisor)

Stratford East Picturehouse London (Duty Manager) 2014-

== Cultural creative ==
Aranytíz Youth Community Centre, Art Director (2001 - 2004) Esztergom Summer Fest, Art Director (2000- 2001) Leader of Ráday Kultucca cultural event (2008-2010).

== Educator ==
Together with János Móka, they were the first in Hungary to elaborate specialized practical training for theatre education - education of theatre practice identical with and based on the English Theatre in Education (TIE) and Drama in Education programs. This training was launched in the Zsámbék Teacher Training College (now Apor Vilmos Catholic University College) in 1998. He is assistant professor at ELTE and King Sigismund College. He leads workshops at Komlósi media school.

== Volunteer ==
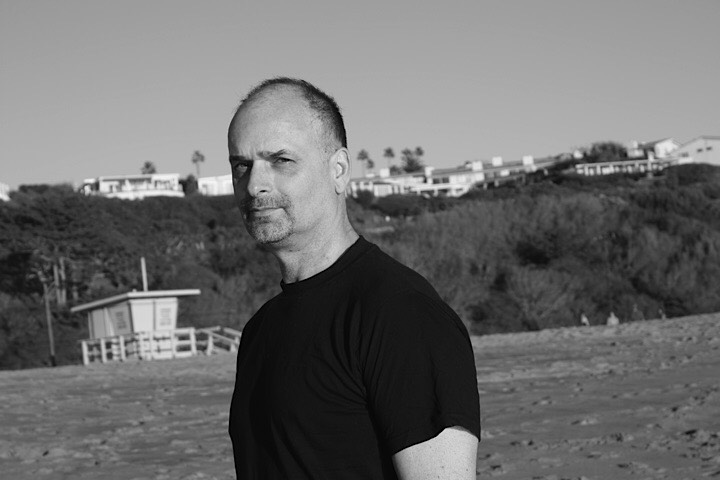
In Malibu Beach, November 2014

Organization of Ünnepi Filmhét (Film Week) for the 60th birthday of István Szabó, film director with public meetings and film screenings. Organization of the first National Professional Theatre Conference, Exhibition and Fair. Creation and organization of the Tata Summer Theatre Nights. Organization of the Weöres Sándor National Children's Theatre Festival. Budapest Spring Festival, organization of Pasolini Week in 2000 and 2005. Organization of Europe Day in Tata. Management and implementation of Jancsó 80 Week (with Nikita Mikhalkov) events. In the Millennium Year, founder of the initiative to erect a life-size bronze Jászai Mari statue from public donations created by György Szabó, Munkácsy awarded sculptor. Former junior Hungarian champion in épée (team) and member in the Hungarian Team. He won the "Arany Zsiraf Prize" for the lyrics of the "Song of the year of Hungary" category with the song "Egyedul" in 2002. The song was published in 2000 and performed by Bery and Eszter Vaczi. Member of the Friends of Theatre and Art Association (organization of national-scale events). Founding member of the Sikeres Ferencvárosért Egyesület (Association for Successful Ferencváros), and of Ferencvárosi Lokálpatrióta Egyesület (Association of Friends of Ferencváros).

New leader of Londoni Magyar Iskola Drama Group for 12–18 years olds from December 2012.

== Producer ==
=== Repertoire Pieces ===
- November 2000 – Sándor Márai: Kaland (play about seduction, love, loneliness, selfishness and carrier)
- 19 December 2002 – Sándor Márai: Válás Budán (marriage, love and divorce – a strange „love square”)
- January 2007 – Puncsék karácsonya (Christmas puppet-show)
- January 2007 – Wilhelm Hauff: A kis mukk története (fairy play about a poor boy seeking happiness)
- 9 February 2007 – Zoltán Egressy: Vesztett éden (historic tragedy about the life of Imre Madách Hungarian playwright) 16 February 2007 – Attila József: Szabad-ötletek jegyzéke két ülésben (poems of the famous Hungarian poet, Attila József, within a framework of free associations)
- 23 March 2007 – István Vajda: Pedig én jó anya voltam (documentary drama about the last death penalty inflicted in Hungary)
- April–May 2007 – Ki kért meg, hogy énekelj? (songs performed by a famous Hungarian actor, Róbert Koltai)
- 2 July 2007 – István Verebes: Sorsjáték (talk show)
- 20 September 2007 – Gyula Urbán: Minden egér szereti a sajtot (Every Mouse Likes Cheese – fairy play)
- 9 October 2007 – Opera prózában Kaposi Gergellyel (Opera talk show with Gergely Kaposi)
- 2 November 2007 – EXIT – international play – a story of those who did not want to stay
- 1 December 2007 – Dosztojevszkij: Nasztaszja Filippovna
- 2 December 2007– Tin Andersén Axell: Garbo (the author's novel adapted for stage)
- 14 December 2007 – Pikáns zsoltár - Pápai Erika Mezei Mária estje (songs of Mária Mezei by Erika Pápay)
- 25 November 2007 – Pincekoncertek az opera csillagaival (Opera concert series)
- 10 January 2008 – Co.ffein projects - Frenák Pál Táncosaival (dance performance)
- 16 February 2008 – István Csukás - Ferenc Darvas: Ágacska (fairy play)
- 8 March 2008 – Martin Sherman - Attila Galambos - Tamás Arany: Isadora (one day of the boisterous marriage of Isadora Duncan and Szergej Jeszenyin – musical)
- 29 March 2008 – Ervin Lázár: The boy and the lions – fairy play
- 9 May 2008 – William Gibson: Two for the Seesaw
- 3 October 2008 – Bengt Ahlfors: The last cigar
- 16 November 2008 – Harold Pinter: Betrayal
- 9 January 2009 – Sándor Márai: Az igazi (Márai's short novel adapted for stage)
- 10 January 2009 – Mese a Kutyusról meg a Cicusról (fairy play about a kitten and a puppy)
- 22 March 2009 – Győrei - Schlachtovszky: Drakula vajda, Mátyás királynak rabja (play about an infamous historic figure, Vlad Tepes, and King Mathias)
- 11 April 2009 – Kukacmatyi (fairy play)
- 24 April 2009 – Csaba Kiss: Esti próba (Zampano és Gelsomina)
- 20 September 2009 – Pince Cabaret
- 16 October 2009 – Arnold Wesker: Annie Wobbler
- 14 November 2009 – Evelyne de la Cheneliere: Strawberries in January
- 5 February 2010 – Leonyid Zorin: Warsaw Melody
- 19 February 2010 – Chloe Moss: Christmas is Miles Away
- 18 May 2010 – Sándor Márai: Fizess nevetve! (ironic short stories adapted for stage)
- 17 September 2010 – Better than Sex – musical from London
- 24 September 2010 – Keresztanya (Godmother – a gipsy fairy tale adapted for stage)
- 23 October 2010 – Karnauhova- Brausevich: The scarlet flower

=== Guest Performances played ===
- 9 November 2007 – Nevető tollak
- 17 November 2007 – Edward Albee: Who is Afraid of Virginia Woolf
- 17 January 2008 – Improvisation theatre
- 24 February 2008 – Kezitcsókolom – performance by Kálmán Hollai
- 11 May 2009 – Mihály Babits: Dagály (play inspired by a beautiful poem of the famous Hungarian poet, Mihály Babits)
- 24 May 2009 – Alina Nelega: Rudolf Hess' Ten Commandments (Aradi színház)

== Director ==
- 14 August 1998 – Duval – Nádas – Szenes: Potyautas
- 20 October 1998 – Lars Norén: Night Is Mother to the Day (Az éjszaka a nappal anyja)
- 20 February 1999 – Beaumarchais: The Marriage of Figaro (Figaro házassága)
- 23 April 1999 – Endre Fejes – Gábor Presser: Jó estét nyár, jó estét szerelem
- 4 December 1999 – Erich Kastner: Emil and the Detectives (Emil és a detektívek)
- 10 November 2000 – Andrew Lloyd Webber: Joseph And The Amazing Technicolor Dreamcoat (József és a színes szélesvásznú álomkabát)
- Exupéry: The Little Prince (A kis herceg)
- Goldoni: Mirandolina
- Murell: Memoir
- Brandon Thomas – Aldobolyi: Charley's Aunt
- Friedrich Schiller: Love and Intrigue
- Valentin Katayev: Squaring the Circle
- Cy Coleman: I Love My Wife
- Christopher Hampton: Illuminations
- Alain Ayckburn: Bedroom Farce
- Ernő Szép: Krémes
- Péter Boldizsár: Aprószentek
- Ferenc Molnár: A Pál utcai fiúk
- Gábor Vaszary: Bubus

== Art director ==
- 1996 – Tibor Miklós: Légy jó mindhalálig (musical)
- 1996 – István Békeffy: A régi nyár (musical)
- 1996 – János Bródy: Kőműves Kelemen (rock ballad)
- 1996 – Thomas Robert: Piége pour un homme seul
- 1996 – Julian Slade: Winnie the Pooh
- 1996 – Zsolt Pozsgai: Szeretlek, Faust
- 1996 – Carlo Goldoni: Locandiera
- 1996 – Beila Anna – Valló Péter: A kis herceg
- 1997 – Péter Boldizsár: Aprószentek
- 1997 – Julius Brammer – Alfred Grünwald: Das Vilchen vom Montmartre (light opera)
- 1997 – Miklós Benedek: Utazás a koponyám körül (monodrama)
- 1997 – Brandon Thomas: Charley's Aunt (musical comedy)
- 1997 – Friedrich Schiller: Kabale und Liebe (tragedy)
- 1997 – Sándor Török: A Pál utcai fiúk
- 1997 – Béla Horgas: Hóbogyó és Kányavér
- 1997 – Paul von Schönthan – Franz von Schönthan: Der Raub der Sabinerinnen (musical comedy)
- 1997 – Per Olov Enquist: Képcsinálók
- 1997 – István Csukás: Ágacska
- 1997 – Angelo Beolco Ruzante: La Moscheta (comedy)
- 1998 – András Nagy: A papagáj
- 1998 – Ede Szigligeti: Liliomfi (comedy)
- 1998 – Gyula Kovács: Az odulakó
- 1998 – Áron Tamási: Énekes madár
- 1998 – Deval Jacques: La Prétentaine (comedy)
- 1998 – Howard Ashman: Little Shop of Horrors(musical horror parody)
- 1998 – Georges Feydeau: Chat en poche (comedy)
- 1998 – Lars Norén: Natten ar dagens mor
- 1998 – Molière: Le Tartuffe ou L’Imposteur
- 1998 – Éva Schubert – Károly Horváth: Piaf Piaf (musical)
- 1998 – Frank Wedekind: Frühlings Erwachen
- 1999 – Pierre-Augustin Caron de Beaumarchais: Le Mariage de Figaro La Folle Journée
- 1999 – Roberto Athayde: Apereque a Margarida
- 1999 – Endre Fejes: Jó estét nyár, jó estét szerelem (musical)
- 1999 – Tibor Déri – Sándor Pós: Képzelt riport egy amerikai popfesztiválról (musical)
- 1999 – Friedrich Schiller: Die Rauber
- 1999 – Gábor Maros: „Fizetek főúr!”
- 1999 – Molière: L’Avare
- 1999 – John Murrell: Memoir
- 1999 – Zoltán Zubornyák: Emil és a detektívek (musical)
- 2000 – Ferenc Molnár: Harmónia
- 2000 – Csaba Lászlóffy: Judit
- 2000 – Victorien Sardou – Émile Moreau: Madame Sens-Gene (comedy)
- 2000 – Alen Ayckbourn: Bedroom Farce (comedy)
- 2000 – Tim Rice: Joseph and the Amazing Technicolor Dreamcoat (musical)
- 2000 – Sophokles: Antigone

== Actor ==
Performed as an actor in the following theatres: Miskolc National Theatre, Eger Gárdonyi Géza Theatre, Békéscsaba Jókai Theatre, Tatabánya Jászai Mari Theatre, Kecskemét Katona József Színház, Vidám Színpad, Játékszín, Katona József Theatre and National Theatre.

=== Theatre ===
- Ede Szigligeti: Liliomfi... Liliomfi
- Sartre: Dirty Hands ... Hugo
- Kander and Ebb: Cabaret ... Konferanszié
- Brandon Thomas: Charley's Aunt ... Frank Babberley

=== Filmography ===
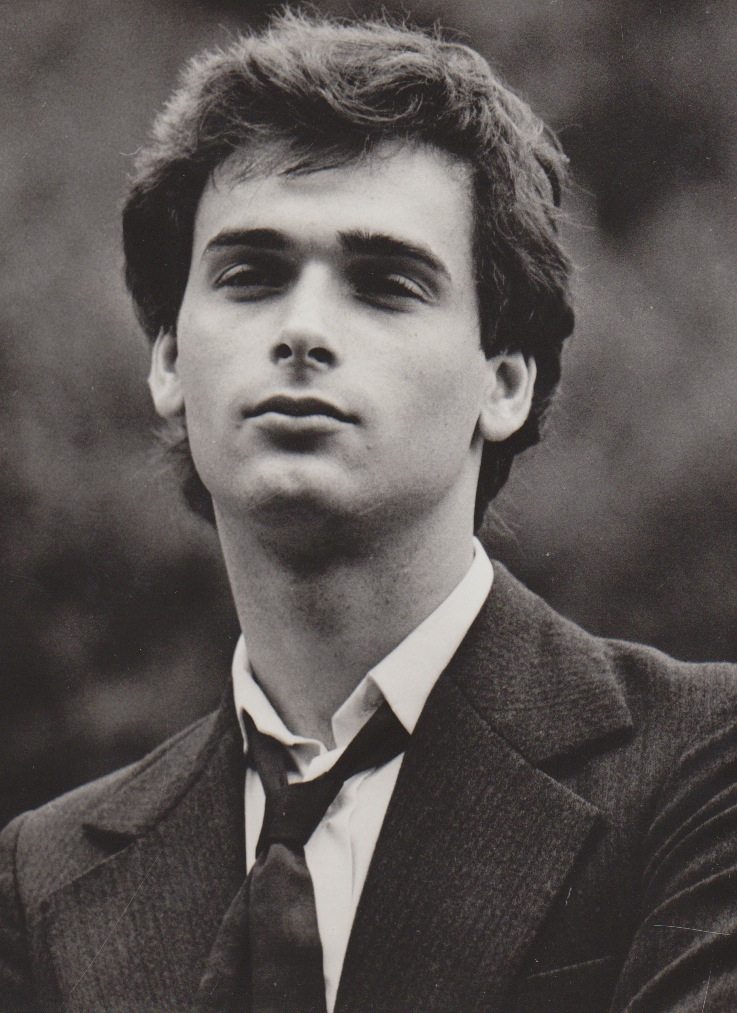
As Kornai Béla aka Kábéla in Ballagás

- 1980 – Ballagás
- 1985 – Eszterlánc
- 1990 – Családi kör
- 1991 – Stalin's Bride
- 1991 – Isten hátrafele megy
- 1991 – Meeting Venus
- 1992 – Új Gálvölgyi-show
- 1995 – The Brother from Brooklyn
- 1995 – Öregberény
- 1996 – Levelek Perzsiából
- 2005 – Szeress most!
- 2002 – Wake Up, Mate, Don't You Sleep
- 2005 – Szeress most!
- 2008 – Stolen Rhythm
- (1991 – 1999) – Szomszédok
