= Klavdiya Studennikova =

Ukrainian swimmer

Personal information
- Nationality: Ukrainian
- Born: 14 November 1958 (age 67) Kyiv, Ukrainian SSR, Soviet Union

Sport
- Sport: Swimming
Medal record
Representing Soviet Union
Summer Universiade
Gold medal – first place	1977 Sofia	100m backstroke
Silver medal – second place	1977 Sofia	4x100m medley relay

Klavdiya Studennikova (born 14 November 1958) is a Ukrainian former swimmer. She competed in two events at the 1976 Summer Olympics for the Soviet Union.
