= Nadiya Stavko =

Ukrainian swimmer

Personal information
- Born: May 3, 1958 (age 68) Dnipropetrovsk, Ukraine
- Height: 1.66 m (5 ft 5 in)
- Weight: 58 kg (128 lb)

Sport
- Sport: Swimming
- Club: CSKA Moscow

Nadezhda "Nadiya" Hryhorivna Stavko (Ukrainian: Надія Григорівна Ставко; Russian: Надежда Григорьевна Ставко; born 3 May 1958) is a retired Ukrainian swimmer. She competed at the 1976 Summer Olympics in the 100 m and 200 m backstroke and 4 × 100 m medley relay and finished in sixth, fourth and fourth place, respectively. In 1974–1975, she won four national titles in backstroke events. She retired from senior swimming in 1978 and later competed in the masters category, winning a national title in 1989. In 1991, together with her husband she moved to New Jersey, United States, where she works as a swimming coach. She has a sister, Lyubov, and a son, Aleksandr.
