= Antje Stille =

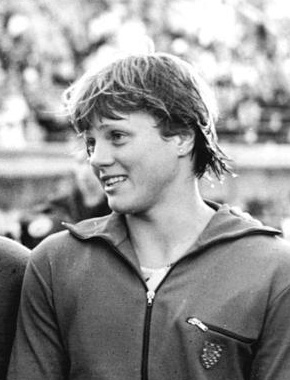
- Stille in 1977

Personal information
- Born: 8 September 1961 (age 64) Salzwedel, Bezirk Magdeburg, East Germany
- Height: 1.71 m (5 ft 7 in)
- Weight: 61 kg (134 lb)

Sport
- Sport: Swimming
- Club: SC Magdeburg

Antje Stille (born 8 September 1961) is a retired German swimmer. In February–March 1976 she set two world records in the 200 m backstroke. Later that year she competed at the 1976 Summer Olympics in the 100 m and 200 m backstroke events and finished in seventh and sixth place, respectively.

Currently she runs a dental clinic in Magdeburg.

Her stepmother Ursula Küper is also a retired Olympic swimmer.
