= Antonella Roncelli =

Italian swimmer

Personal information
- Born: 1 May 1959 (age 67)

Sport
- Sport: Swimming

Antonella Roncelli (born 1 May 1959) is an Italian former backstroke swimmer. She competed in three events at the 1976 Summer Olympics.
