= Michelle de Vries =

Australian swimmer (born 1961)

Personal information
- Born: 2 October 1961 (age 64)

Sport
- Sport: Swimming
- Strokes: backstroke

Michelle de Vries (born 2 October 1961) is an Australian former backstroke swimmer. She competed in three events at the 1976 Summer Olympics.
