= Ernie Vandeweghe =

American basketball player (1928–2014)

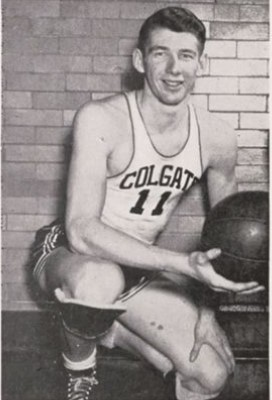
- Vandeweghe as a senior at Colgate

Personal information
- Born: September 12, 1928 Montreal, Canada
- Died: November 8, 2014 (aged 86) Newport Beach, California, U.S.
- Listed height: 6 ft 3 in (1.91 m)
- Listed weight: 195 lb (88 kg)

Career information
- High school: Oceanside (Oceanside, New York)
- College: Colgate (1945–1949)
- NBA draft: 1949: 3rd round
- Drafted by: New York Knicks
- Playing career: 1949–1956
- Position: Shooting guard / small forward
- Number: 9, 18

Career history
- 1949–1956: New York Knicks

Career highlights
- Consensus second-team All-American (1949); No. 11 retired by Colgate Raiders

Career statistics
- Points: 2,135 (9.5 ppg)
- Rebounds: 834 (4.6 rpg)
- Assists: 548 (2.4 apg)
- Stats at NBA.com
- Stats at Basketball Reference

Ernest Maurice Vandeweghe Jr. (September 12, 1928 – November 8, 2014) was a Canadian professional basketball player. Vandeweghe was best known for playing for the New York Knicks of the NBA and for the athletic successes of his family.

== Personal life ==
Vandeweghe and his wife Colleen Kay Hutchins (Miss America for 1952) were the parents of former NBA All-Star Kiki VanDeWeghe and Olympic swimmer Tauna Vandeweghe, and grandparents of tennis professional CoCo Vandeweghe.

== Biography ==
Born in Montreal, Vandeweghe moved to Long Island, New York as a teenager and played football, basketball and baseball for Oceanside High School where he was also a member of the Omega Gamma Delta fraternity. A 6'3" guard, Vandeweghe played collegiately for the Colgate University Raiders, where he was an All-American. He was drafted by the Knicks in the 1949 BAA Draft, and played in the NBA for six seasons.

After retiring from the NBA in 1956, Vandeweghe served as a physician for the Air Force while stationed overseas in Germany. Besides Kiki, he had three other children who were successful athletes: daughter Tauna won a U.S. national swimming championship in the backstroke (and competed in the 1976 Summer Olympics), son Bruk medalled in beach volleyball in the 1994 Goodwill Games, and daughter Heather was captain of the U.S. national women's polo team and followed in her father's footsteps through medical school to become a physician.

Vandeweghe served as chairman of the President's Council on Physical Fitness and Sports, and served on the Olympic Sports Commission under President Gerald Ford, where he assisted with the development of two key pieces of sports legislation – Title IX and the 1976 Amateur Athletic Act. He was also a senior vice president with Focus Partners LLC, a New York–based financial services firm, and a consultant with the United States Golf and Fitness Association. He occasionally provided commentary for several sports publications.

Vandeweghe died at the age of 86 on November 8, 2014.

== Career statistics ==
Legend
GP	Games played	GS	Games started	MPG	Minutes per game
FG%	Field goal percentage	3P%	3-point field goal percentage	FT%	Free throw percentage
RPG	Rebounds per game	APG	Assists per game	SPG	Steals per game
BPG	Blocks per game	PPG	Points per game	**Bold**	Career high

=== NBA ===
==== Regular season ====
Year	Team	GP	MPG	FG%	FT%	RPG	APG	PPG
1949–50	New York	42	–	.421	.664	–	1.9	10.0
1950–51	New York	44	–	.402	.701	4.4	2.8	7.7
1951–52	New York	57	26.4	**.438**	.775	4.6	**2.9**	9.2
1952–53	New York	**61**	**28.6**	.435	.766	**5.6**	2.4	**12.0**
1953–54	New York	15	18.1	.359	.806	1.3	1.9	6.6
1955–56	New York	5	15.4	.323	**1.000**	2.6	2.4	4.4
Career		224	26.1	.421	.740	4.6	2.4	9.5

==== Playoffs ====
Year	Team	GP	MPG	FG%	FT%	RPG	APG	PPG
1950	New York	4	–	.346	**.875**	–	.8	8.0
1951	New York	**14***	–	.407	.730	4.7	2.4	7.2
1952	New York	**14***	29.6	.432	.817	4.9	1.9	10.8
1953	New York	11	**30.9**	**.438**	.754	**5.8**	**2.5**	**13.1**
Career		43	30.2	.421	.782	5.1	2.1	10.0

== See also ==
- List of Montreal athletes
- List of famous Montrealers
- List of Canadians in the National Basketball Association
