= Karin Bormann =

German swimmer

Personal information
- Born: 22 May 1954 (age 72) Düsseldorf, Germany

Sport
- Sport: Swimming

Karin Bormann (born 22 May 1954) is a German former swimmer. She competed at the 1972 Summer Olympics and the 1976 Summer Olympics.
