= Liliana Cian =

Colombian swimmer

Personal information
- Born: 19 July 1959 (age 67)

Sport
- Sport: Swimming

Liliana Cian (born 19 July 1959) is a Colombian former swimmer. She competed in three events at the 1976 Summer Olympics.
