= Kiki VanDeWeghe =

American basketball player, coach and executive (born 1958)

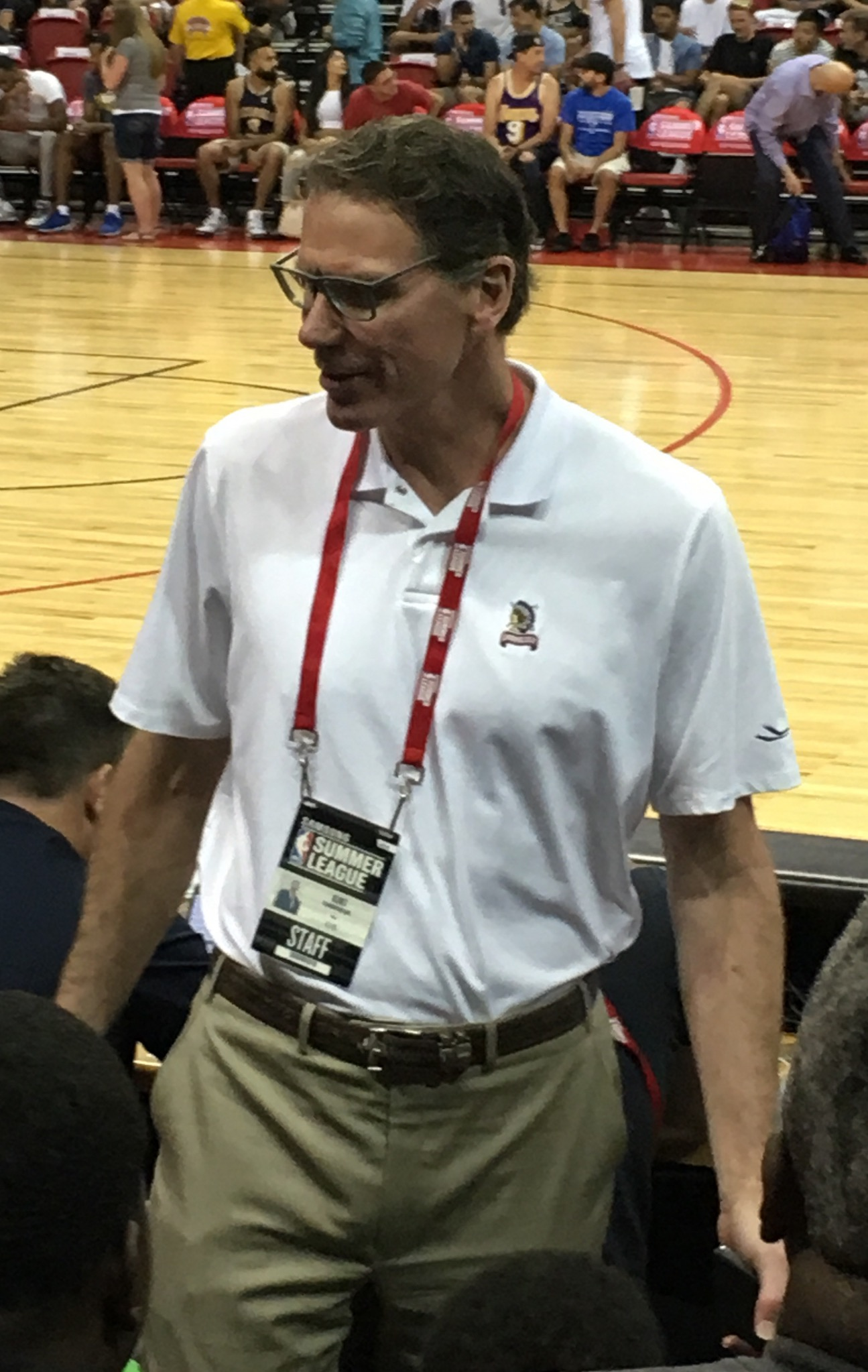
- VanDeWeghe in 2016

Personal information
- Born: August 1, 1958 (age 68) Wiesbaden, West Germany
- Listed height: 6 ft 8 in (2.03 m)
- Listed weight: 220 lb (100 kg)

Career information
- High school: Palisades (Los Angeles, California)
- College: UCLA (1976–1980)
- NBA draft: 1980: 1st round, 11th overall pick
- Drafted by: Dallas Mavericks
- Playing career: 1980–1993
- Position: Small forward / power forward
- Number: 55

Career history

Playing
- 1980–1984: Denver Nuggets
- 1984–1989: Portland Trail Blazers
- 1989–1992: New York Knicks
- 1992–1993: Los Angeles Clippers

Coaching
- 1999–2001: Dallas Mavericks (assistant)
- 2009–2010: New Jersey Nets

Career highlights
- 2× NBA All-Star (1983, 1984); First-team All-Pac-10 (1980); Second-team All-Pac-10 (1979); Fourth-team Parade All-American (1976)

Career NBA statistics
- Points: 15,980 (19.7 ppg)
- Rebounds: 2,785 (3.4 rpg)
- Assists: 1,668 (2.1 apg)
- Stats at NBA.com
- Stats at Basketball Reference

Ernest Maurice "Kiki" VanDeWeghe III (born August 1, 1958) is an American former professional basketball player, coach and executive who is an advisor for the National Basketball Association (NBA). As a player, he was a two-time NBA All-Star.

== Biography ==
VanDeWeghe was born on August 1, 1958, in Wiesbaden, West Germany, the son of former NBA player Ernie Vandeweghe (who was serving as a physician for the U.S. Air Force while stationed overseas in Germany) and Colleen Kay Hutchins, the winner of the 1952 Miss America pageant.

VanDeWeghe moved back to the U.S. as a child and wound up playing college basketball for the UCLA Bruins, where he earned all-conference honors in the Pac-10 (now known as the Pac-12). He led the Bruins to the 1980 NCAA championship game, where they would lose to Louisville. He became an excellent scorer and outside shooter in the NBA, averaging 20 points for seven consecutive seasons. He was particularly known for his use of the stepback, a move he was so proficient at that it was often referred to as the "Kiki Move" toward the end of his career. VanDeWeghe's teams qualified for the NBA playoffs in 12 of his 13 seasons in the league, although none of his teams ever won the NBA championship. VanDeWeghe was later the general manager of the Denver Nuggets and the New Jersey Nets, and a head coach of the Nets. He was the NBA's executive vice president of basketball operations for eight years (2013–2021).

For the bulk of his career, VanDeWeghe spelled his surname "Vandeweghe" (with only the V capitalized), a spelling used by his parents before their deaths, and still used by his niece who has a prominent tennis career. In 2013, he announced he was changing the spelling of his name to "VanDeWeghe", in honor of his recently departed paternal grandfather and namesake.

== College career ==
VanDeWeghe played four seasons at the University of California, Los Angeles, culminating in a senior season in which expectations for the Bruins were lower than in previous seasons. The team was coming off a season in which they lost three starters, David Greenwood, Roy Hamilton, and Brad Holland to the NBA as first-round draft picks. Also, the Bruins had a new coach, Larry Brown, who was coaching a collegiate team for the first time. Replacing this talent were some mainly unknown freshman, namely "Rocket" Rod Foster, Michael Holton, and Darren Daye, along with sophomore Mike Sanders. VanDeWeghe and James Wilkes were the lone seniors. The team was sluggish at the first, but gelled toward the end and finished the regular season 17–9. The Bruins, dubbed "Kiki and the Kids", were the 48th and final team selected to participate in the 1979–80 NCAA Men's Division I Basketball Tournament. With VanDeWeghe leading the way, the Bruins made it all the way to the final, upsetting #1 DePaul and Mark Aguirre on the way. In the final, the Bruins lost to the University of Louisville led by Darrell Griffith.

== Playing career ==
VanDeWeghe was drafted 11th overall in the 1980 NBA draft by the Dallas Mavericks, but refused to play for Dallas and demanded a trade (for virtually the remainder of his career, he was subjected to boos whenever he played in Dallas). He got his wish, and was traded to the Nuggets on December 3 of that same year. As a member of the Nuggets, VanDeWeghe was twice selected to the NBA Western Conference All-Star team, in 1983 and 1984. He was second in scoring in 1983, averaging 26.7 points, and 3rd in 1984 with a career-high 29.4 points.

During the 1983–84 Nuggets season, VanDeWeghe scored 50 or more points in two NBA record-setting games. The first, on December 13, 1983, in which he had a career-high 51 points, is also the highest combined scoring game in NBA history, a 186–184 triple-overtime loss to the Detroit Pistons. In the second, a 163–155 win over the San Antonio Spurs on January 11, 1984 (at the time, the highest combined scoring NBA regulation game of all time), he had an even 50.

In the summer of 1984, VanDeWeghe was traded to the Portland Trail Blazers in exchange for Calvin Natt, Wayne Cooper, Fat Lever, and two draft picks. He had several productive seasons in Portland, where he averaged nearly 25 points a game paired with Clyde Drexler to form a dynamic scoring duo. In the 1986 NBA Playoffs, VanDeWeghe averaged a postseason career high 28 points a game in a first round loss to his former team, the Nuggets. On March 5, 1987, VanDeWeghe scored 48 points, his highest single game total as a Trail Blazer, in a 127–122 loss to the Seattle SuperSonics. However, during the 1987–88 season, VanDeWeghe suffered a back injury and lost his starting job to Jerome Kersey. He was traded the next year to the New York Knicks (where his father played his entire career), with whom he played for several years. He then played half a season with the Los Angeles Clippers before retiring from the league after the 1992–93 season.

== Executive career ==
VanDeWeghe was hired by the Dallas Mavericks in 1998. He was director of player personnel and assistant coach for the next two seasons, he was instrumental in the development of Dirk Nowitzki. On August 9, 2001, VanDeWeghe was named to the Nuggets' general manager position and oversaw a return by the Nuggets to the NBA playoffs. Major moves by VanDeWeghe included the drafting of Carmelo Anthony in 2003, the trade for Marcus Camby in 2002 and the hiring of George Karl as head coach in 2005. However, some other moves by VanDeWeghe backfired outright or failed to produce the desired returns, such as the drafting of draft bust Nikoloz Tskitishvili in 2002 and the sign-and-trade deal with the New Jersey Nets to acquire Kenyon Martin at the end of the 2003–04 season. Shortly following a first-round playoff elimination at the hands of the Clippers in the 2006 playoffs, the Nuggets announced that VanDeWeghe's contract would not be renewed.

He spent 2006–07 as an NBA analyst for ESPN, appearing on the channel's SportsCenter and NBA Shootaround programs, among others. However, on December 31, 2007, the Nets announced that VanDeWeghe would join the team as a special assistant to team president and general manager Rod Thorn. VanDeWeghe replaced Ed Stefanski, who left the Nets to join the Philadelphia 76ers earlier in the month. Stefanski replaced Billy King as the 76ers' general manager.

On December 1, 2009, VanDeWeghe agreed to assume duties as interim head coach of the Nets while continuing to be general manager of the team (although assistant coach Tom Barrise served as head coach for their December 2 game). VanDeWeghe replaced Lawrence Frank as head coach after the Nets started the 2009–10 season with 16 consecutive losses. VanDeWeghe hired Del Harris as an assistant, who was to be his "virtual co-coach", though he resigned midway through the season on February 2, 2010. Harris resigned after he learned that a possible side deal that he had made with VanDeWeghe to become head coach had failed.

After Nets ownership changed hands, Mikhail Prokhorov announced that VanDeWeghe would not return the following season.

VanDeWeghe joined the leadership team of the NBA in 2013, serving as the executive vice president of basketball operations for eight years through 2021, when he transitioned into an advisory role to both NBA commissioner Adam Silver and president of league operations Byron Spruell.

== Personal life ==
VanDeWeghe is the nephew of NBA player and four-time All-Star Mel Hutchins. He has a niece, Coco Vandeweghe, who is a former professional tennis player. VanDeWeghe and his wife Peggy have one son, Ernest Maurice Reece VanDeWeghe IV, born in 2002.

His nephew, Hugh VanDeWeghe, plays NCAA Division I basketball for the California Golden Bears.

== NBA career statistics ==
Legend
GP	Games played	GS	Games started	MPG	Minutes per game
FG%	Field goal percentage	3P%	3-point field goal percentage	FT%	Free throw percentage
RPG	Rebounds per game	APG	Assists per game	SPG	Steals per game
BPG	Blocks per game	PPG	Points per game	**Bold**	Career high

=== Regular season ===
Year	Team	GP	GS	MPG	FG%	3P%	FT%	RPG	APG	SPG	BPG	PPG
1980–81	Denver	51	–	27.0	.426	.000	.818	5.3	1.8	0.6	0.5	11.5
1981–82	Denver	**82**	78	33.8	**.560**	.077	.857	**5.6**	3.0	0.6	0.4	21.5
1982–83	Denver	**82**	**79**	35.5	.547	.294	.875	5.3	2.5	**0.8**	0.5	26.7
1983–84	Denver	78	71	35.1	.558	.367	.852	4.8	**3.1**	0.7	**0.6**	**29.4**
1984–85	Portland	72	69	34.8	.534	.333	.896	3.2	1.5	0.5	0.3	22.4
1985–86	Portland	79	76	35.3	.540	.125	.869	2.7	2.4	0.7	0.2	24.8
1986–87	Portland	79	**79**	**38.3**	.523	.481*	.886	3.2	2.8	0.7	0.2	26.9
1987–88	Portland	37	7	28.1	.508	.379	.878	2.9	1.9	0.6	0.2	20.2
1988–89	Portland	18	1	24.0	.475	.421	.879	1.9	1.9	0.4	0.2	13.9
1988–89	New York	27	0	18.6	.464	.300	.911	1.3	1.3	0.4	0.3	9.2
1989–90	New York	22	13	25.6	.442	**.526**	**.917**	2.4	1.9	0.7	0.1	11.7
1990–91	New York	75	72	32.3	.494	.362	.899	2.4	1.5	0.6	0.1	16.3
1991–92	New York	67	0	14.3	.491	.394	.802	1.3	0.9	0.2	0.1	7.0
1992–93	L.A. Clippers	41	3	12.0	.453	.324	.879	1.2	0.6	0.3	0.2	6.2
Career		810	548	30.3	.525	.368	.872	3.4	2.1	0.6	0.3	19.7
All-Star		2	0	20.0	.588	–	.500	3.0	1.0	0.5	0.0	10.5

=== Playoffs ===
Year	Team	GP	GS	MPG	FG%	3P%	FT%	RPG	APG	SPG	BPG	PPG
1982	Denver	3	–	36.3	**.581**	–	**1.000**	6.0	3.0	0.7	**1.3**	22.7
1983	Denver	8	–	39.6	.544	.000	.800	**6.5**	**4.0**	0.5	0.9	26.8
1984	Denver	5	–	36.0	.510	.400	.964	4.6	**4.0**	**1.8**	1.0	25.4
1985	Portland	9	9	34.6	.538	.143	.939	3.0	1.9	0.9	0.3	22.4
1986	Portland	4	4	37.3	.580	.000	**1.000**	1.3	2.0	0.5	0.5	**28.0**
1987	Portland	4	4	**43.5**	.535	.250	.846	3.3	2.8	0.3	0.3	24.8
1988	Portland	4	0	18.0	.275	.000	**1.000**	3.3	1.8	0.3	0.0	7.8
1989	New York	9	0	17.7	.510	.375	.952	1.2	0.8	0.3	0.2	8.1
1990	New York	**10**	**10**	23.6	.419	.462	.800	1.2	1.4	0.5	0.2	7.6
1991	New York	3	3	33.0	.406	.600	.880	2.7	1.3	0.3	0.0	17.0
1992	New York	8	0	9.4	.542	**.800**	.857	0.8	0.5	0.3	0.1	4.5
1993	L.A. Clippers	1	0	9.0	.333	–	–	0.0	1.0	1.0	0.0	4.0
Career		68	30	27.8	.510	.345	.907	2.8	2.0	0.6	0.4	16.1

== Head coaching record ==
Legend
Regular season	G	Games coached	W	Games won	L	Games lost	W–L %	Win–loss %
Playoffs	PG	Playoff games	PW	Playoff wins	PL	Playoff losses	PW–L %	Playoff win–loss %

Team	Year	G	W	L	W–L%	Finish	PG	PW	PL	PW–L%	Result
New Jersey	2009–10	64	12	52	.188	5th in Atlantic	—	—	—	—	Missed playoffs
Career		64	12	52	.188		—	—	—	—	

== See also ==
- List of National Basketball Association career free throw percentage leaders
