= Swimming at the 1976 Summer Olympics – Women's 200 metre breaststroke =

Women's 200 metre breaststroke at the Games of the XXI Olympiad
- Venue: Olympic Pool
- Date: 21 July 1976 (heats & final)
- Competitors: 39 from 22 nations
- Winning time: 2:33.35 WR

Medalists
1st place, gold medalist(s)		Marina Kosheveya	Soviet Union
2nd place, silver medalist(s)		Marina Yurchenya	Soviet Union
3rd place, bronze medalist(s)		Lyubov Rusanova	Soviet Union

The women's 200 metre breaststroke event, included in the swimming competition at the 1976 Summer Olympics, took place on July 21, at the Olympic Pool in Montreal, Canada. In this event, swimmers covered four lengths of the 50-metre (160 ft) Olympic-sized pool employing the breaststroke. It was the twelfth appearance of the event, which first appeared at the 1924 Summer Olympics in Paris. A total of 39 competitors from 22 nations participated in the event.

== Records ==
Prior to this competition, the existing world and Olympic records were:

World record	Karla Linke (GDR)	2:34.99 s	Vienna, Austria	19 August 1974
Olympic record	Beverley Whitfield (AUS)	2:41.71 s	Munich, West Germany	29 August 1972

The following records were established during the competition:

Date	Round	Name	Nationality	Time	OR	WR
21 July	Heat 1	Marina Kosheveya	Soviet Union	2:35.14	OR	
21 July	Final	Marina Kosheveya	Soviet Union	2:33.35	OR	WR

== Results ==
=== Heats ===
Rank	Heat	Name	Nationality	Time	Notes
1	1	Marina Kosheveya	Soviet Union	2:35.14	Q, OR
2	5	Karla Linke	East Germany	2:37.13	Q
3	4	Hannelore Anke	East Germany	2:37.13	Q
4	4	Lyubov Rusanova	Soviet Union	2:37.45	Q
5	2	Marina Yurchenya	Soviet Union	2:37.92	Q
6	1	Debbie Rudd	Great Britain	2:38.26	Q
7	3	Margaret Kelly	Great Britain	2:39.01	Q
8	5	Carola Nitschke	East Germany	2:39.06	Q
9	3	Joann Baker	Canada	2:39.27	
10	5	Wijda Mazereeuw	Netherlands	2:39.59	
11	3	Lisa Borsholt	Canada	2:39.94	
12	2	Susanne Nielsson	Denmark	2:41.09	
13	2	Ann-Sofi Roos	Sweden	2:41.38	
14	2	Christine Jarvis	Great Britain	2:41.61	
15	2	Laura Siering	United States	2:41.66	
16	1	Marcia Morey	United States	2:41.85	
17	4	Dagmar Rehak	West Germany	2:41.98	
18	4	Anna Skolarczyk	Poland	2:42.05	
19	2	Gabriele Askamp	West Germany	2:42.58	
20	4	Judith Hudson	Australia	2:43.88	
21	2	Kazuyo Inaba	Japan	2:44.08	
22	5	Toshiko Haruoka	Japan	2:44.11	
23	3	Melanie MacKay	Canada	2:45.08	
24	4	Anette Fredriksson	Sweden	2:45.31	
25	5	Janis Hape	United States	2:45.57	
26	3	Annick de Susini	France	2:45.63	
27	3	Karin Deleurand	Denmark	2:45.96	
28	3	Chiharu Mori	Japan	2:46.04	
29	4	Colette Crabbe	Belgium	2:47.16	
30	5	Véronique Brisy	Belgium	2:47.55	
31	1	Cristina Teixeira	Brazil	2:47.69	
32	1	Allison Smith	Australia	2:50.11	
33	1	Beatriz Camuñas	Mexico	2:50.78	
34	4	Angela López	Puerto Rico	2:52.71	
35	5	Nancy Deano	Philippines	2:53.08	
36	3	Elena Ospitaletche	Uruguay	2:53.60	
37	1	Dacyl Pérez	Venezuela	2:56.76	
38	2	Patricia Spohn	Argentina	2:59.51	
39	1	Éva Kiss	Hungary	—	DNS

=== Final ===
Rank	Name	Nationality	Time	Notes
1st place, gold medalist(s)	Marina Kosheveya	Soviet Union	2:33.35	WR
2nd place, silver medalist(s)	Marina Yurchenya	Soviet Union	2:36.08	
3rd place, bronze medalist(s)	Lyubov Rusanova	Soviet Union	2:36.22	
4	Hannelore Anke	East Germany	2:36.49	
5	Karla Linke	East Germany	2:36.97	
6	Carola Nitschke	East Germany	2:38.27	
7	Margaret Kelly	Great Britain	2:38.37	
8	Debbie Rudd	Great Britain	2:39.01	

== Sources ==
- "Games of the XXI Olympiad; Montréal 1976" (PDF). Volume Three. COJO 76. 1976. Archived from the original (PDF) on 27 September 2007.
- Albert Schoenfeld, ed. (September 1976). "Results from the 1976 Olympic Games (Montreal)" (PDF). Swimming World & Junior Swimmer. Albert Schoenfeld. p. 90. ISSN 0039-7431.
