= Swimming at the 1976 Summer Olympics – Women's 100 metre breaststroke =

Women's 100 metre breaststroke at the Games of the XXI Olympiad
- Venue: Olympic Pool, Montreal
- Date: 22 July 1976 (heats & semifinals); 24 July 1976 (final)
- Competitors: 38 from 22 nations
- Winning time: 1:11.16

Medalists
1st place, gold medalist(s)		Hannelore Anke	East Germany
2nd place, silver medalist(s)		Lyubov Rusanova	Soviet Union
3rd place, bronze medalist(s)		Marina Koshevaya	Soviet Union

The women's 100 metre breaststroke event for the 1976 Summer Olympics was held in the Olympic Pool, Montreal. The event took place between 22–24 July 1976.

== Results ==
=== Heats ===
Heat 1

Rank	Athlete	Country	Time	Notes
1	Marina Koshevaya	Soviet Union	1:14.64	Q
2	Annick de Susini	France	1:15.79	Q
3	Dagmar Rehak	West Germany	1:15.95	
4	Ann-Sofi Roos	Sweden	1:18.61	
5	Beatriz Camuñas	Mexico	1:20.46	

Heat 2

Rank	Athlete	Country	Time	Notes
1	Robin Corsiglia	Canada	1:14.14	Q
2	Gabriele Askamp	West Germany	1:14.31	Q
3T	Anna Skolarczyk	Poland	1:17.16	
3T	Anette Fredriksson	Sweden	1:17.16	
5	Kazuyo Inaba	Japan	1:17.20	
6	Nancy Deano	Philippines	1:20.93	

Heat 3

Rank	Athlete	Country	Time	Notes
1	Lyubov Rusanova	Soviet Union	1:14.14	Q
2	Lisa Borsholt	Canada	1:15.05	Q
3	Karla Linke	East Germany	1:15.36	Q
4	Karin Deleurand	Denmark	1:19.06	
5	Véronique Brisy	Belgium	1:19.56	
6	Elena Ospitaletche	Uruguay	1:21.44	

Heat 4

Rank	Athlete	Country	Time	Notes
1	Maryna Yurchenia	Soviet Union	1:14.81	Q
2	Lauri Siering	United States	1:15.41	Q
3	Iris Corniani	Italy	1:17.21	
4	Marcia Morey	United States	1:17.30	
5	Helen Burnham	Great Britain	1:17.31	
6	Cristina Teixeira	Brazil	1:17.94	
7	Dacyl Pérez	Venezuela	1:21.39	

Heat 5

Rank	Athlete	Country	Time	Notes
1	Hannelore Anke	East Germany	1:11.11	Q, WR
2	Maggie Kelly-Hohmann	Great Britain	1:14.23	Q
3	Joann Baker	Canada	1:15.55	Q
4	Toshiko Haruoka	Japan	1:16.31	
5	Renee Laravie	United States	1:16.76	
6	Ilse Schoors	Belgium	1:18.63	
7	Angela López	Puerto Rico	1:22.95	

Key: WR = World record

Heat 6

Rank	Athlete	Country	Time	Notes
1	Carola Nitschke	East Germany	1:13.36	Q
2	Wijda Mazereeuw	Netherlands	1:14.81	Q
3	Christine Jarvis	Great Britain	1:14.94	Q
4	Susanne Nielsson	Denmark	1:15.43	Q
5	Maritzka van der Linden	Netherlands	1:16.76	
6	Rossana Juncos	Argentina	1:21.53	
7	Allison Smith	Australia	1:21.62	

=== Semifinals ===
Heat 1

Rank	Athlete	Country	Time	Notes
1	Lyubov Rusanova	Soviet Union	1:13.53	Q
2	Carola Nitschke	East Germany	1:13.73	Q
3	Maryna Yurchenia	Soviet Union	1:13.96	Q
4	Karla Linke	East Germany	1:14.49	Q
5	Gabriele Askamp	West Germany	1:14.50	Q
6	Christine Jarvis	Great Britain	1:14.59	
7	Susanne Nielsson	Denmark	1:15.38	
8	Annick de Susini	France	1:16.30	

Heat 2

Rank	Athlete	Country	Time	Notes
1	Hannelore Anke	East Germany	1:10.86	Q, WR
2	Marina Koshevaya	Soviet Union	1:13.20	Q
3	Maggie Kelly-Hohmann	Great Britain	1:13.57	Q
4	Robin Corsiglia	Canada	1:14.56	
5	Lauri Siering	United States	1:14.84	
6	Wijda Mazereeuw	Netherlands	1:14.86	
7	Joann Baker	Canada	1:15.20	
8	Lisa Borsholt	Canada	1:15.41	

Key: WR = World record

=== Final ===
Rank	Athlete	Country	Time	Notes
1	Hannelore Anke	East Germany	1:11.16	
2	Lyubov Rusanova	Soviet Union	1:13.04	
3	Marina Koshevaya	Soviet Union	1:13.30	
4	Carola Nitschke	East Germany	1:13.33	
5	Gabriele Askamp	West Germany	1:14.15	
6	Maryna Yurchenia	Soviet Union	1:14.17	
7	Maggie Kelly-Hohmann	Great Britain	1:14.20	
8	Karla Linke	East Germany	1:14.21	
