= Janis Hape =

American swimmer (1958–2021)

Personal information
- Full name: Janis Lynn Hape -Dowd
- National team: United States
- Born: March 10, 1958 Gary, Indiana, U.S.
- Died: March 7, 2021 (aged 62) Charlotte, North Carolina, U.S.
- Height: 5 ft 6 in (1.68 m)
- Weight: 126 lb (57 kg)
- Spouse: Frank Dowd IV (1991)
- Children: 3

Sport
- Sport: Swimming
- Strokes: Breaststroke
- Club: Totem Lake Swim Club; Pittsburgh Swim Club; Mission Viejo Nadadores
- College team: University of North Carolina 1980
- Coach: George Falwell (West Genesee High); Jack Nelson (Olympics); Frank Comfort (UNC)

Janis Lynn Hape (March 10, 1958 – March 7, 2021), also known by her married name Janis Dowd, was an American competition swimmer who earned All American honors competing for the University of North Carolina. Prior to college, at 18, she participated in the 1976 Montreal Olympics in the 200-meter breaststroke recording a time of 2:45.57, finishing in 25th place. She later co-founded the aerobics studio Exercise Plus in Charlotte, North Carolina, which she operated through 1993. She and her husband Frank Dowd were generous donors to USA swimming and the University of North Carolina Swimming and Diving program, and she was a co-founder of the Janis Hape Dowd Nike Invitational, a swimming competition held at North Carolina's Koury Natatorium.

== Early life ==
Hape was born March 10, 1958, in Gary, Indiana as the third child of Diana and James Marshall Hape. She had two older brothers, Jeff and Gary. After a family move to Beaver, Pennsylvania, she learned to swim at age seven at the nearby Sewickly, Pennsylvania YMCA.

Moving again to Pittsburgh with her family, she attended North Allegheny High School in the Pittsburgh suburb of Wexford, where she competed on their Varsity swim team beginning as a Freshman, and broke a number of Pennsylvania State records. She competed in AAU meets and trained for a period with the Pittsburgh swim club during her time at Allegheny High. Moving to Camillus, New York with her family in 1975, she attended and swam for Camillus's West Genesee High School through her Senior year graduating in January 1976. At West Genesse High, where she was coached by George Falwell, she led the girl's team to an undefeated season, and a title in the OHSL Conference in the Fall of 1975. Moving often, she swam for a number of clubs during her early swimming career that included Kirland, Washington's Totem Lake Swim Club, and one of America's top programs, Southern California's Mission Viejo Nadadores likely during the coaching tenure of founder George Haines or Coach Mark Schubert.

=== High school records ===
At the August, 1975 National AAU Senior meet in Kansas City, Kansas, Hape placed third in the 200-meter breaststroke, with a time of 2:40.7, just 2.31 seconds over the American record.

On November 15, 1975, while competing for West Genesee High at the girls Intersectional Swimming Tournament, Hape broke the national age-group record for the 100 breaststroke with a time of 1:09.3, and swam a leg on the freestyle relay team that set a National record of 3:58.5.

After qualifying for the U.S. Olympic team by placing third in the 200-meter breaststroke in the Olympic trials, Hape trained at Virginia's West Point.

== 1976 Montreal Olympics ==
Hape represented the United States as an 18-year-old at the 1976 Summer Olympics in Montreal, Quebec where she was managed by U.S. Women's Head Coach Jack Nelson. She competed in the preliminary heats of the women's 200-meter breaststroke, and recorded a best time of 2:45.57, finishing in 25th place.

Hape made the U.S. Olympic team for the 1980 Moscow Olympics but could not participate as America boycotted the games in protest of Russia's invasion of Afghanistan.

=== University of North Carolina ===
Hape attended the University of North Carolina at Chapel Hill, on an athletic scholarship and swam for the North Carolina Tar Heels swimming and diving team in National Collegiate Athletic Association (NCAA) competition from 1977 to 1980. In both her freshman and sophomore years she earned All American honors, and established new North Carolina school records in breaststroke for the 50, 100, and 200 yard events. In addition to breastroke, she competed in both the 200 and 400-yard medley relay. The North Carolina women's team, managed by Head Coach Frank Comfort was exceptionally strong those years, and also featured 1972 Olympian Ann Marshall, 1976 Olympic medalist Wendy Weinberg, and 1976 100-meter American record holder Bonnie Brown. In 1980, near the end of Hape's time swimming at North Carolina, Sue Walsh, UNC Athletic Hall of Fame and 1983 Pan American Gold medalist, joined the team.

A 1980 graduate of USC, she moved to Charlotte, North Carolina and founded the aerobics club Exercise Plus, which she operated through 1993 with her friend Kathy Horvath.

=== Marriage and philanthropy ===
On May 11, 1991, Hape married Frank Dowd IV, another UNC alumnus. Dowd's family operated and owned the Charlotte Pipe and Foundry company, founded by the family in 1901. A strong supporter of the swimming community, the Dowd family provided funding to USA Swimming and the USA Swimming Foundation. They have also been generous contributors to University of North Carolina Swimming and Diving program. Hape's two bouts with non-Hodgkin lymphoma weakened her from chemotherapy and radiation treatments. In her honor, she and her husband Frank founded the Janis Hape Dowd Nike Invitational, a swimming competition held at North Carolina's Koury Natatorium.

=== Honors ===
In 2019, Hape was made a member of the University of North Carolina Hall of Fame.

Hape died from heart failure in Charlotte, Carolina on March 7, 2021, at the age of 62, having suffered from non-Hodgkin lymphoma. She was survived by her husband Frank Dowd, a son, and twin daughters.

== See also ==
- List of University of North Carolina at Chapel Hill alumni
- List of University of North Carolina at Chapel Hill Olympians
