= Swimming at the 1976 Summer Olympics – Women's 4 × 100 metre medley relay =

Women's 4 × 100 metre medley relay at the Games of the XXI Olympiad
- Venue: Olympic Pool
- Date: 18 July 1976 (heats & final)
- Competitors: 75 from 17 nations
- Teams: 17
- Winning time: 4:07.95 WR

Medalists
1st place, gold medalist(s)		Ulrike Richter, Hannelore Anke, Andrea Pollack, Kornelia Ender,Birgit Treiber*, Carola Nitschke* Rosemarie Gabriel*	East Germany
2nd place, silver medalist(s)		Linda Jezek, Lauri Siering, Camille Wright, Shirley Babashoff, Lelei Fonoimoana* Wendy Boglioli*	United States
3rd place, bronze medalist(s)		Wendy Hogg, Robin Corsiglia, Susan Sloan, Anne Jardin, Deborah Clarke*; *Indicates the swimmer only competed in the preliminary heats.	Canada

The women's 4 × 100 metre medley relay event for the 1976 Summer Olympics was held in Montreal. The even took place on Sunday, 18 July 1976.

== Heats ==
Heat 1

Place	Swimmers	Time	Notes
1	Camille Wright, Shirley Babashoff, LeLei Fonoimoana, Wendy Boglioli (USA)	4:20.87	
2	Michelle de Vries, Judith Hudson, Linda Hanel, Jenny Tate (AUS)	4:26.07	
3	Silvia Fontana, Rosa Estiarte, Magda Camps, Montserrat Majo (ESP)	4:38.42	
4	Diana Hatler, Angela López, María Mock, Jane Fayer (PUR)	4:49.45	
5	Angelika Grieser, Dagmar Rehak, Gudrun Beckmann, Marion Platten (FRG)		DQ

Heat 2

Place	Swimmers	Time	Notes
1	Wendy Cook-Hogg, Robin Corsiglia, Susan Sloan, Debbie Clarke (CAN)	4:20.10	
2	Diane Edelijn, Wijda Mazereeuw, Ineke Ran, Enith Brigitha (NED)	4:22.49	
3	Joy Beasley, Maggie Kelly-Hohmann, Sue Jenner, Debbie Hill (GBR)	4:23.91	
4	Sylvie Testuz, Annick de Susini, Pascale Ducongé, Guylaine Berger (FRA)	4:26.48	
5	Carine Verbauwen, Ilse Schoors, Chantal Grimard, Anne Richard (BEL)	4:30.78	
6	Paola Ruggieri, Dacyl Pérez, Marianela Huen, Vania Vázquez (VEN)	4:43.78	

Heat 3

Place	Swimmers	Time	Notes
1	Kornelia Ender, Birgit Treiber, Carola Nitschke, Rosemarie Kother-Gabriel (GDR)	4:13.98	
2	Nadiya Stavko, Maryna Yurchenia, Tamara Shelofastova, Larisa Tsaryova (URS)	4:18.73	
3	Yoshimi Nishigawa (1:06.34) NR, Toshiko Haruoka, Yasue Hatsuda, Sachiko Yamazaki (JPN)	4:25.81	NR
4	Gunilla Lundberg, Anette Fredriksson, Gunilla Andersson, Ylva Persson (SWE)	4:29.46	
5	Antonella Roncelli, Iris Corniani, Donatella Talpo-Schiavon, Elisabetta Dessy (ITA)	4:31.20	
6	Claudia Bellotto, Patricia Spohn, Rossana Juncos, Susana Coppo (ARG)	4:41.82	

== Final ==
Rank	Nation	Swimmers	Time	Notes
1st place, gold medalist(s)	East Germany	Ulrike Richter; Hannelore Anke; Andrea Pollack; Kornelia Ender (Birgit Treiber) (Carola Nitschke) (Rosemarie Gabriel)	4:07.95	
2nd place, silver medalist(s)	United States	Linda Jezek; Lauri Siering; Camille Wright; Shirley Babashoff (Lelei Fonoimoana) (Wendy Boglioli)	4:14.55	
3rd place, bronze medalist(s)	Canada	Wendy Hogg; Robin Corsiglia; Susan Sloan; Anne Jardin (Deborah Clarke)	4:15.22	
4	Soviet Union	Nadiya Stavko; Maryna Yurchenya; Tamara Shelofastova; Larissa Tsareva	4:16.05	
5	Netherlands	Diane Edelijn; Wijda Mazereeuw; José Damen; Enith Brigitha (Ineke Ran)	4:19.03	
6	Great Britain	Joy Beasley; Margaret Kelly; Susan Jenner; Deborah Hill	4:23.25	
7	Japan	Yoshimi Nishigawa (1:06.01) NR; Toshiko Haruoka; Yasue Hatsuda; Sachiko Yamazaki	4:23.47	NR
8	Australia	Michelle Devries; Judith Hudson; Linda Hanel; Jenny Tate	4:25.91	

Parenthesis indicate that the athlete competed in preliminary rounds, but not in the final.
