= East Kilbride (disambiguation) =

East Kilbride is the largest town in the South Lanarkshire council area of Scotland

East Kilbride may also refer to:

- East Kilbride (district), a local government district, 1975 to 1996
- East Kilbride (Scottish Parliament constituency), the constituency of the Scottish Parliament created in 1999
- East Kilbride (UK Parliament constituency), the historic constituency of the House of Commons of the Parliament of the United Kingdom, 1974 to 2005
