= 1984 East Kilbride District Council election =

East Kilbride District Council election

← 1980	3 May 1984	1988 →

All 16 seats to East Kilbride District Council 9 seats needed for a majority
- Registered: 62,774
- Turnout: 44.1%
	First party	Second party
	Lab	Con
Party	Labour	Conservative
Last election	12 seats, 53.1%	2 seats, 17.6%
Seats won	14	2
Seat change	▲2	Steady
Popular vote	15,312	3,366
Percentage	55.4%	12.2%
Swing	▲2.3	▼5.4
Council Leader before election
Labour
Council Leader after election
Labour

Elections to East Kilbride District Council were held on 3 May 1984, on the same day as the other Scottish local government elections. This was the fourth election to the district council following the local government reforms in the 1970s.

The election was the first to use the 16 wards created by the Initial Statutory Reviews of Electoral Arrangements in 1980 – an increase of one from the previous arrangements. Each ward elected one councillor using first-past-the-post voting.

Labour maintained control of the district council after winning 14 of the 16 seats – an increase of two – and taking more than half of the popular vote. The remaining two seats were won by the Conservatives. Despite taking a fifth of the vote and coming second in the popular vote, the Scottish National Party (SNP) lost their representation on the district council just seven years after winning control of the council.

== Results ==
1984 East Kilbride District Council election result
Party	Seats	Gains	Losses	Net gain/loss	Seats %	Votes %	Votes	+/−
Labour	14	2	0	▲2	87.5	55.4	15,312	▲2.3
Conservative	2	0	0	Steady	12.5	12.2	3,366	▼5.4
SNP	0	0	1	▼1	0.0	20.0	5,514	▼7.2
SDP	0	0	0	Steady	0.0	5.4	1,513	New
Liberal	0	0	0	Steady	0.0	4.4	1,231	▲3.4
Independent	0	0	0	Steady	0.0	1.8	509	▲1.3
Communist	0	0	0	Steady	0.0	0.3	102	▲0.1
Ecology	0	0	0	Steady	0.0	0.2	68	New
Total	16						27,615	

Note: Boundary changes resulted in a net increase of one seat overall.

== Ward results ==
=== Maxwellton ===
Maxwellton
Party	Candidate	Votes	%	±%
Labour	G. McKillop	1,348	66.9	▲4.0
Conservative	E. Kay	334	16.6	▼3.6
SNP	A. Murphy	264	13.1	▼3.9
Ecology	C. I. Kirby	68	3.4	New
Majority		1,014	50.3	▲7.6
Turnout		2,014	49.2	▲1.4
Registered electors		4,098		
Labour hold		Swing	▲4.0	

=== Long Calderwood ===
Long Calderwood
Party	Candidate	Votes	%	±%
Labour	J. Cameron	1,156	63.1	▲10.3
SNP	A. Douglas	344	18.8	▼22.6
SDP	B. Balkind	325	17.7	New
Majority		812	44.3	▲32.9
Turnout		1,825	45.9	▲1.9
Registered electors		3,995		
Labour hold		Swing	▲10.3	

=== Morrishall ===
Morrishall
Party	Candidate	Votes	%	±%
Labour	A. Dick	1,139	72.2	▲2.0
SNP	A. Shaw	435	27.6	▼1.6
Majority		704	44.6	▲3.6
Turnout		1,574	40.5	▲3.9
Registered electors		3,897		
Labour hold		Swing	▲2.0	

=== Blacklaw ===
Blacklaw
Party	Candidate	Votes	%	±%
Labour	C. Robb	1,073	65.6	▲12.1
SNP	J. Wilson	544	33.3	▲16.4
Majority		529	32.3	▼0.4
Turnout		1,617	40.4	▼4.3
Registered electors		4,049		
Labour hold		Swing	▲12.1	

=== Calderglen ===
Calderglen
Party	Candidate	Votes	%	±%
Labour	H. Biggins	775	46.5	▼9.2
SDP	A. P. Dicken	378	22.7	New
Conservative	A. Leggat	306	18.4	▼3.2
SNP	S. Finlayson	203	12.2	▼10.5
Majority		397	23.8	▼9.2
Turnout		1,662	41.8	▲0.6
Registered electors		3,985		
Labour hold		Swing	▼16.1	

=== Duncanrig ===
Duncanrig
Party	Candidate	Votes	%	±%
Labour	S. Crawford	1,134	70.8	▲1.3
SNP	P. Currie	456	28.5	▼1.1
Majority		678	42.3	▲2.4
Turnout		1,590	39.0	▼3.9
Registered electors		4,102		
Labour hold		Swing	▲1.3	

=== Westwoodhill ===
Westwoodhill
Party	Candidate	Votes	%	±%
Labour	A. Ingram	1,115	62.3	▲1.5
SNP	J. Bruce	377	21.1	▼5.3
Liberal	W. A. MacKill	293	16.4	New
Majority		738	41.2	▲6.8
Turnout		1,785	42.8	▲0.8
Registered electors		4,181		
Labour hold		Swing	▲1.5	

=== Hairmyres ===
Hairmyres
Party	Candidate	Votes	%	±%
Labour	E. McKenna	605	39.5	▼17.2
Conservative	L. Fox	390	25.5	▲10.5
SDP	M. Davies	319	20.8	New
SNP	I. MacNaught	216	14.1	▼14.0
Majority		215	14.0	▼14.6
Turnout		1,530	44.3	▲7.4
Registered electors		3,459		
Labour hold		Swing	▼13.8	

=== West Mains ===
West Mains
Party	Candidate	Votes	%	±%
Labour	J. M. C. P. Sutherland	902	48.3	▲3.8
Conservative	E. Chalmers	304	16.3	▲5.3
SNP	M. Neilson	229	12.3	▼23.3
Independent	W. Sinclair	221	11.8	New
Liberal	I. W. Dalgleish	134	7.2	New
Communist	W. Quinn	76	4.1	New
Majority		598	32.0	▲23.1
Turnout		1,866	49.2	▲4.2
Registered electors		3,791		
Labour hold		Swing	▲13.5	

=== East Mains ===
East Mains
Party	Candidate	Votes	%	±%
Labour	E. Findlay	1,155	56.9	▼3.6
Liberal	A. J. Sutherland	524	25.8	New
SNP	D. Urquhart	344	17.0	▼1.1
Majority		631	31.1	▼8.2
Turnout		2,023	51.0	▲1.4
Registered electors		3,930		
Labour hold		Swing	▼3.6	

=== Kelvin ===
Kelvin
Party	Candidate	Votes	%	±%
Labour	J. Reilly	823	50.7	▲2.1
SNP	W. Johnston	799	49.2	▼2.0
Majority		24	1.5	N/A
Turnout		1,622	56.1	▲7.2
Registered electors		2,895		
Labour gain from SNP		Swing	▲2.1	

=== Lickprivick ===
Lickprivick
Party	Candidate	Votes	%	±%
Labour	E. Ross	1,193	74.0	▲12.6
SNP	C. Duke	410	25.4	▼10.2
Majority		783	48.6	▲22.8
Turnout		1,603	40.3	Steady
Registered electors		3,996		
Labour hold		Swing	▲12.6	

=== Headhouse ===
Headhouse
Party	Candidate	Votes	%	±%
Labour	P. McGregor	1,025	57.0	▼2.3
Independent	J. Marshall	288	16.0	New
SDP	R. May	245	13.6	New
SNP	G. Rae	236	13.1	▼10.6
Majority		737	41.0	▲5.4
Turnout		1,794	45.4	▼1.5
Registered electors		3,963		
Labour hold		Swing	▼2.3	

=== Avondale South ===
Avondale South
Party	Candidate	Votes	%	±%
Conservative	R. Cameron	904	49.6	▲3.2
Labour	J. Molloy	505	27.7	▲0.4
SDP	T. Coleman	246	13.5	New
SNP	D. Williams	165	9.1	▼17.1
Majority		399	21.9	▲2.8
Turnout		1,820	40.9	▼4.6
Registered electors		4,456		
Conservative hold		Swing	▲1.4	

=== Avondale North ===
Avondale North
Party	Candidate	Votes	%	±%
Conservative	A. H. Chalmers	957	53.0	▼4.4
Labour	B. Quail	412	22.8	▼3.1
Liberal	I. Norie	280	15.5	New
SNP	D. W. Ross	156	8.6	▼8.0
Majority		545	31.2	▼0.3
Turnout		1,805	42.2	▼8.7
Registered electors		4,282		
Conservative hold		Swing	▼4.4	

=== Crosshouse ===
Crosshouse
Party	Candidate	Votes	%
Labour	J. Buchanan	952	64.0
SNP	G. Neilson	336	22.6
Conservative	J. Taylor	171	11.5
Communist	D. Molloy	26	1.7
Majority		616	41.4
Turnout		1,485	40.2
Registered electors		3,695	
Labour win (new seat)			
