= Fonoimoana =

Fonoimoana is a surname. Notable people with the surname include:

- Eric Fonoimoana (born 1969), American beach volleyball player, Olympic gold medalist
- Falyn Fonoimoana (born 1996), American indoor and beach volleyball player
- Lelei Fonoimoana (born 1958), American swimmer, Olympic silver medalist
