= Lelei =

Lelei may refer to:

- Lelei, village in Hodod
- Lelei Fonoimoana (born 1958), American swimmer
- Amanaki Lelei Mafi (born 1990), Japan international rugby player
- David Lelei (1971–2010), Kenyan middle-distance runner
- Sammy Lelei (born 1964), Kenyan marathon runner
