= East Kilbride Civic Centre =

Municipal building in Cromarty, Scotland

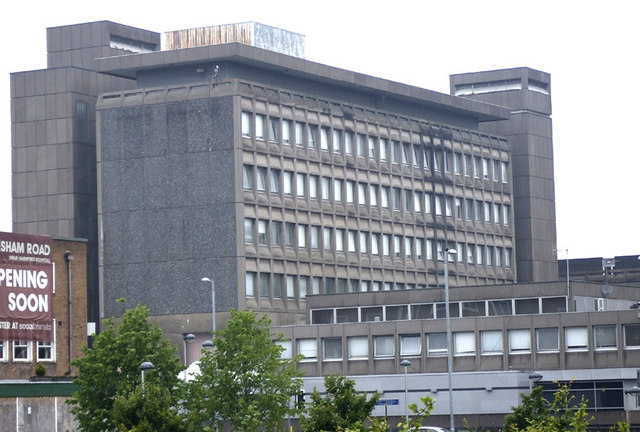
- East Kilbride Civic Centre

- Shown in South Lanarkshire
- 55.7622°N 4.1751°W
- Location: Cornwall Street, East Kilbride

History
- Built: 1968

Site notes
- Architect(s): Scott Fraser & Browning
- Architectural style: Brutalist style

East Kilbride Civic Centre is a municipal building in Cornwall Street, East Kilbride, South Lanarkshire, Scotland. The structure was the headquarters of East Kilbride District Council.

== History ==
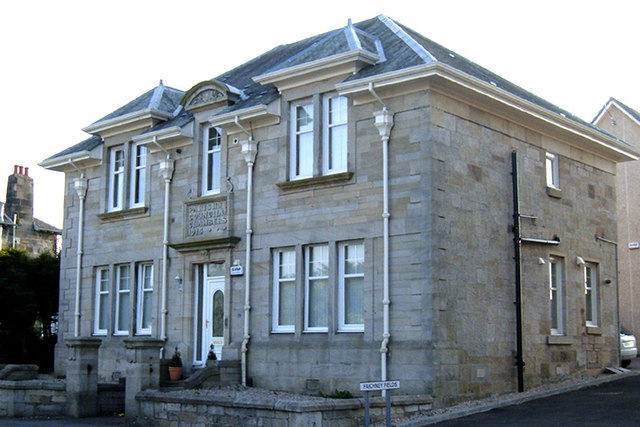
East Kilbride Parish Chambers

In the early 20th century, the population of East Kilbride was less than 4,000. The first municipal building there was the old parish chambers in Main Street which was designed in the style of a villa, built in sandstone and was completed in 1913. The design involved a symmetrical main frontage of three bays facing onto Main Street. The central bay featured a doorway with a stone surround, a keystone and a cornice surmounted by a panel inscribed with the words "Parish Council Chambers 1913"; on the first floor, there was a single window surmounted by a segmental pediment. The outer bays were fenestrated by tri-partite windows on the ground floor and by bi-partite windows with dormer heads on the first floor.

Following significant population growth, largely associated with the development of the area as a new town, East Kilbride became a small burgh in 1963. In this context, the burgh leaders decided to commission more substantial offices: the site they selected was open land within the new town development area. The new building was designed by Scott Fraser & Browning, built by Holland, Hannen & Cubitts in concrete and glass and was officially opened by Princess Margaret, Countess of Snowdon, who was accompanied by the Earl of Snowdon, on 12 November 1968.

The design involved a five-storey rectangular wing adjacent to Andrew Street with two lower rise structures extending eastwards behind the building. Internally, the principal rooms were the council chamber, the district courtroom and an entertainments venue known as the Ballerup Hall which had a seating capacity of 300 people. The hall was named after Ballerup, East Kilbride's twin town in Denmark. A Wurlitzer concert organ with two manuals and ten pipe ranks was installed in the hall.

Following local government re-organisation in 1975, the building became the headquarters of the enlarged East Kilbride District Council, but it ceased to be the local seat of government when the new unitary authority, South Lanarkshire Council, was formed at Hamilton in 1996. However, it continued to be used by South Lanarkshire Council as a base for the delivery of local services. In February 2022, the council considered a masterplan for the town centre: options for the civic centre in the document included ongoing investment to restore the crumbling concrete on the building, or demolishing it and replacing it with a more modern civic structure.
