= Askamp =

Askamp is a surname. Notable people with the surname include:

- Gabriele Askamp (born 1955), German swimmer
- Marlies Askamp (born 1970), German basketball player
