= Camille Wright =

American swimmer (born 1955)

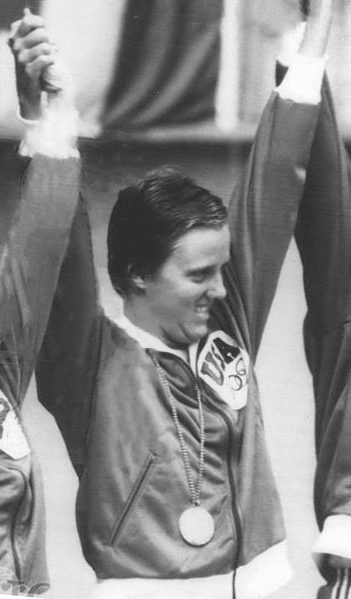
- Wright at the 1976 Olympics

Personal information
- Full name: Camille Wright
- National team: United States
- Born: March 5, 1955 (age 71) New Albany, Indiana, U.S.
- Height: 5 ft 8 in (1.73 m)
- Weight: 130 lb (59 kg)

Sport
- Sport: Swimming
- Strokes: Butterfly
- Club: Louisville Tarpons
- College team: University of Hawaii
Medal record
Representing the United States
Olympic Games
Silver medal – second place	Montreal 1976	4×100 m medley
World Championships (LC)
Silver medal – second place	1975 Cali	4×100 m medley
Bronze medal – third place	1975 Cali	100 m butterfly
Pan American Games
Gold medal – first place	1975 Mexico City	100 m butterfly
Gold medal – first place	1975 Mexico City	200 m butterfly
Gold medal – first place	1975 Mexico City	4×100 m medley

Camille Wright Thompson (born March 5, 1955) is an American former competition swimmer and Olympic medalist.

Wright won three gold medals at the 1975 Pan American Games in Mexico City, including the 100-meter and 200-meter butterfly events, and as a member of the winning U.S. team in the 4×100-meter medley relay. At the 1975 World Aquatics Championships in Cali, Colombia, she received a silver medal as a member of the second-place U.S. team in the 4×100-meter medley relay, and a bronze in the 100-meter butterfly.

Wright represented the United States at the 1976 Summer Olympics in Montreal, Quebec. She received a silver medal as a member of the second-place U.S. team in the women's 4×100-meter medley relay, together with teammates Linda Jezek (backstroke), Lauri Siering (breaststroke), and Shirley Babashoff (freestyle).

Individually, Wright also competed in the 100- and 200-meter butterfly events at the 1976 Olympics. She finished fourth overall in the women's 100-meter butterfly with a time of 1:01.41. In the 200-meter butterfly, she recorded the tenth best overall time of 2:14.77, but did not advance to the event final.

== See also ==
- List of Olympic medalists in swimming (women)
- List of University of Hawaii alumni
- List of World Aquatics Championships medalists in swimming (women)
