= Pascale Ducongé =

French swimmer

Personal information
- Born: 6 January 1961 (age 65)

Sport
- Sport: Swimming

Pascale Ducongé (born 6 January 1961) is a French former swimmer. She competed in the women's 4 × 100 metre medley relay at the 1976 Summer Olympics.
