= Marina Kosheveya =

Soviet swimmer (born 1960)

Personal information
- Born: April 1, 1960 (age 66) Moscow, Soviet Union

Sport
- Sport: Swimming
- Strokes: Breaststroke
Medal record
Representing the Soviet Union
Olympic Games
| Gold medal – first place | 1976 Montreal | 200 m breaststroke |
| Bronze medal – third place | 1976 Montreal | 100 m breaststroke |

Marina Koshevaya (born April 1, 1960, in Moscow) is a former Soviet swimmer and olympic champion. She competed at the 1976 Olympic Games in Montreal, Quebec, Canada, where she received a gold medal in 200 m breaststroke, and a bronze medal in 100 m breaststroke.
