= Lelei Fonoimoana =

American swimmer (born 1958)

Personal information
- Full name: Lelei Alofa Moore
- National team: Team USA
- Born: November 4, 1958 (age 67) Sterling, Illinois, U.S.
- Occupation(s): Swim Coach, Life Guard, Therapist
- Height: 5 ft 8 in (1.73 m)
- Weight: 143 lb (65 kg)

Sport
- Sport: Swimming
- Event(s): 100 Butterfly, Medley Relay
- Strokes: Butterfly
- Club: Surfside Swim Club, Redondo Beach; Lakewood Aquatic Club (LAC)
- College team: Brigham Young University Cougars
- Coach: Jim Montrella (LAC)
Medal record
Women's swimming
Representing the United States
Olympic Games
Silver medal – second place	1976 Montreal	4x100 m medley relay

Lelei Alofa Fonoimoana (born November 4, 1958), also known by her married name Lelei Moore, is an American former swimmer who competed in the 1976 Summer Olympics in Montreal, Quebec.

Lelei was born November 4, 1958, in Sterling, Illinois. After a move, she lived in Manhattan Beach, California and at 9 competed for the Surfside Swim Club in Redondo Beach. By the age of 12 she competed for the strong program at the Lakewood Aquatic Club under Coach Jim Montrella. Already a strong swimmer and competitor, Fonoimoana attended Center Junior High School, where she and her sister Debbie, won Decathlon events for four successive years. By 13, Lelei practiced year round with Lakewood Aquatics, averaging 15-20 hours a week, though her training time likely increased in preparation for the Olympics. In June, 1976, she graduated Mira Costa High School in Manhattan Beach.

== Open water swimming ==
Possessing considerable endurance at the age of 13, Fonoimoana competed in an Eight Mile Rough Water Swim at an International Swim Festival in August, 1971. Continuing to perform in Open Water, Fonoimoana won three events at the International Surf Festival at Hermosa Beach including the two mile, quarter mile and half mile tandem open water races in August, 1972, despite having previously broken her foot. Despite the injury, after having the foot placed in a cast and a three-week period of rest, she continued to train for the Junior Olympics with the casted foot in a tight plastic bag. The injury hampered her ability to kick, but did not stop her training.

At a highpoint in her early swimming career, in 1973 Fonoimoana established an American age-group record in the 400 medley relay.

== 1976 Montreal Olympic medal ==
At 15 in June, 1976, Fonoimoana set an American record in the 100-meter butterfly of 1:02.11, taking a third place behind Camille Wright and Wendy Boglioli at the 1976 U.S. Trials at Belmont Pool in Long Beach, California, while qualifying for the U.S. team. Boglioli had held the former U.S. record of 1:02.14. Dedicated to her training, she exceeded expectations and came from a 25th sport to defy the odds and qualify for the U.S. team.

In Mid-July, 1976, Fonoimoana earned a silver medal at the Montreal Olympics swimming the butterfly leg in Heat One of the preliminaries for the second-place U.S. team in the 4×100-meter medley relay with teammates Linda Jezek, Lauri Siering, and Wendy Boglioli. Her preliminary team swam a combined time of 4:20.87, winning their preliminary heat and advancing the U.S. team to the finals. Later in the finals, the U.S. Women's silver medal 4x100 meter medley relay team swam a combined time of 4:14.55, finishing a full 6.6 seconds behind the East German team, a considerable distance. Several members of the East German women's team would later be accused of steroid doping.

Fonoimoana also finished seventh in the 100-meter butterfly at Montreal with a time of 1:01.95 in a very close finish, less than a second from contending for a medal. East German Kornelia Ender, 1975 world record holder in the event, took the gold with a 1:00.13, and East German Andrea Pollock took the silver with a time of 1:00.98. American Wendy Boglioli took the bronze with a time of 1:01.17.

== Brigham Young University ==
Fonoimoana entered Brigham Young in 1976, where she was a pre-med major and claimed 11 All-America honors in swimming. A strong women's team with a tradition of winning, the BYU Cougars have captured 18 Big 12 conference titles, and between 1980 and 2013 placed first or second in their conference each year. Fonoimoana held Brigham Young school records in swimming for both the 50, 100, and 200-meter butterfly, and in individual medley for both the 100 and 200-meter events. While competing for the Brigham young team, in individual butterfly and individual-medley events, in 1977-1979 and 1981, as she interrupted her collegiate career to train for the 1980 Summer Olympics but did no compete because of the U.S.-led boycott of the Moscow Games. As a Senior she was selected Outstanding Senior Female Athlete by the Cougar Club and was named to the AIAW All-Region Team. She continued to compete through 1981 but retired after that year.

=== Honors ===
In November 1973, Fonoimoana received a most improved award in her age group category at an Awards Banquet of the Lakewood Aquatic Club. In recognition of her 1976 Olympic achievements, Fonoimoana was presented a key to the city of Manhattan Beach by a proclamation of the City Council members. She was inducted into the Brigham Young University Hall of Fame in 1991. As a Senior at Brigham Young, Fonoimoana was selected Outstanding Senior Female Athlete by the Cougar Club and was named to the AIAW All-Region Team.

== Post competitive swimming career ==
She later worked as a swim coach at UCLA, Los Angeles County lifeguard, a therapist, and a dance instructor. Lelei has also served as a Coach at Surfside Swim Club in Redondo Beach, California.

== Personal life ==
She is the sister of fellow Olympian Eric Fonoimoana, and they are of Samoan and Irish descent. She is a member of the Church of Jesus Christ of Latter-day Saints.

== See also ==
- List of Olympic medalists in swimming (women)
