= 1988 East Kilbride District Council election =

East Kilbride District Council election

← 1984	5 May 1988	1992 →

All 16 seats to East Kilbride District Council 9 seats needed for a majority
- Registered: 63,956
- Turnout: 47.5%
	First party	Second party
	Lab	Con
Party	Labour	Conservative
Last election	14 seats, 55.4%	2 seats, 12.1%
Seats won	14	2
Seat change	Steady	Steady
Popular vote	15,579	2,931
Percentage	51.6%	9.7%
Swing	▼3.8	▼2.4
Council Leader before election
Labour
Council Leader after election
Labour

Elections to East Kilbride District Council were held on 5 May 1988, on the same day as the other Scottish local government elections. This was the fifth election to the district council following the local government reforms in the 1970s.

The election used the 16 wards created by the Initial Statutory Reviews of Electoral Arrangements in 1980. Each ward elected one councillor using first-past-the-post voting.

Labour maintained control of the district council after winning 14 of the 16 seats – taking over half of the popular vote. The remaining two seats were won by the Conservatives. The Scottish National Party (SNP) came second on the popular vote but did not gain any seats as the election resulted in the same political composition as the previous election.

== Results ==
1988 East Kilbride District election result
Party	Seats	Gains	Losses	Net gain/loss	Seats %	Votes %	Votes	+/−
Labour	14	0	0	Steady	87.5	51.6	15,579	▼3.8
Conservative	2	0	0	Steady	12.5	9.7	2,931	▼2.4
SNP	0	0	0	Steady	0.0	30.4	9,183	▲10.4
SSLD	0	0	0	Steady	0.0	6.2	1,853	▼3.7 (Note: At the 1984 election, the SDP–Liberal Alliance won 9.9% of the vote with candidates from both the Social Democratic Party (SDP) and the Liberal Party. These parties subsequently merged in March 1988 to form the Scottish Social and Liberal Democrats (SSLD).)
Independent	0	0	0	Steady	0.0	1.7	484	▼0.1
SDP	0	0	0	Steady	0.0	0.7	192	New
Communist	0	0	0	Steady	0.0	0.1	27	▼0.2
Total	16						30,249	

== Ward results ==
=== Maxwellton ===
Maxwellton
Party	Candidate	Votes	%	±%
Labour	G. McKillop	1,227	63.6	▼3.3
SNP	A. Shaw	471	24.4	▲11.3
SSLD	A. Brash	221	11.5	New
Majority		756	39.2	▼11.1
Turnout		1,919	49.5	▲0.3
Registered electors		3,892		
Labour hold		Swing	▼3.3	

=== Long Calderwood ===
Long Calderwood
Party	Candidate	Votes	%	±%
Labour	S. Wright	1,071	56.8	▼6.3
SNP	R. M. Brady	591	31.4	▲12.6
SSLD	E. Mullen	115	6.1	▼11.6
SDP	B. Balkind	103	5.5	New
Majority		480	25.4	▼18.9
Turnout		1,880	49.6	▲3.7
Registered electors		3,802		
Labour hold		Swing	▼6.3	

=== Morrishall ===
Morrishall
Party	Candidate	Votes	%	±%
Labour	A. Dick	1,120	59.1	▼13.1
SNP	W. Arthur	765	40.4	▲12.8
Majority		355	18.7	▼25.9
Turnout		1,885	47.4	▲6.9
Registered electors		3,997		
Labour hold		Swing	▼13.1	

=== Blacklaw ===
Blacklaw
Party	Candidate	Votes	%	±%
Labour	C. Robb	1,095	55.8	▼9.8
SNP	R. Littler	501	25.5	▼7.8
SSLD	W. Gillespie	360	18.3	New
Majority		594	30.3	▼2.0
Turnout		1,956	48.8	▲8.4
Registered electors		4,023		
Labour hold		Swing	▼9.8	

=== Calderglen ===
Calderglen
Party	Candidate	Votes	%	±%
Labour	H. Biggins	918	51.4	▲4.9
SSLD	A. Sutherland	448	25.1	▲2.4
SNP	D. O. Harrold	403	22.6	▲10.4
Majority		470	26.3	▲2.5
Turnout		1,769	43.2	▲1.4
Registered electors		4,132		
Labour hold		Swing	▲1.2	

=== Duncanrig ===
Duncanrig
Party	Candidate	Votes	%	±%
Labour	S. Crawford	1,225	66.1	▼4.7
SNP	C. Duke	618	33.4	▲4.9
Majority		607	32.7	▼9.6
Turnout		1,843	48.0	▲9.0
Registered electors		3,863		
Labour hold		Swing	▼4.7	

=== Westwoodhill ===
Westwoodhill
Party	Candidate	Votes	%	±%
Labour	F. Whitelaw	984	55.5	▼6.8
SNP	J. Henderson	675	38.1	▲17.0
SSLD	J. Rolland	109	6.2	▼10.2
Majority		309	17.4	▼23.8
Turnout		1,768	44.8	▲2.0
Registered electors		3,959		
Labour hold		Swing	▼6.8	

=== Hairmyres ===
Hairmyres
Party	Candidate	Votes	%	±%
Labour	E. McKenna	688	39.4	▼0.1
SNP	D. Watson	472	27.0	▲12.9
Conservative	M. Lang	385	22.1	▼3.4
SSLD	I. Norie	109	6.2	▼14.6
SDP	C. Slorach	89	5.1	New
Majority		216	12.4	▼1.6
Turnout		1,743	43.9	▼0.4
Registered electors		3,975		
Labour hold		Swing	▼6.5	

=== West Mains ===
West Mains
Party	Candidate	Votes	%	±%
Labour	W. McNab	937	49.3	▲1.0
SNP	J. Anderson	441	23.2	▲10.9
Independent	W. Sinclair	284	14.9	▲3.1
Conservative	E. Chalmers	210	11.0	▼5.3
Communist	K. Elder	27	1.4	▼2.7
Majority		496	26.1	▼5.9
Turnout		1,899	50.0	▲0.8
Registered electors		3,802		
Labour hold		Swing	▼4.9	

=== East Mains ===
East Mains
Party	Candidate	Votes	%	±%
Labour	E. Findlay	1,244	57.7	▲0.8
SNP	J. Wilson	476	22.1	▲5.1
Conservative	I. Perratt	235	10.9	New
Independent	W. Stenhouse	200	9.3	New
Majority		768	35.6	▲5.5
Turnout		2,155	53.7	▲2.7
Registered electors		4,016		
Labour hold		Swing	▲0.8	

=== Kelvin ===
Kelvin
Party	Candidate	Votes	%	±%
Labour	J. Reilly	1,070	54.1	▲3.4
SNP	W. Johnston	904	45.7	▼3.5
Majority		166	8.4	▲6.9
Turnout		1,974	54.8	▼1.3
Registered electors		3,605		
Labour hold		Swing	▲3.4	

=== Lickprivick ===
Lickprivick
Party	Candidate	Votes	%	±%
Labour	E. Ross	1,080	58.2	▼15.8
SNP	G. Ferguson	772	41.6	▲16.2
Majority		308	16.6	▼32.0
Turnout		1,852	45.2	▲4.9
Registered electors		4,103		
Labour hold		Swing	▼15.8	

=== Headhouse ===
Headhouse
Party	Candidate	Votes	%	±%
Labour	B. Lynch	856	46.9	▼10.1
SNP	N. Ferguson	750	41.1	▲28.0
SSLD	W. MacKill	209	11.4	▼2.2
Majority		106	5.8	▼35.2
Turnout		1,815	49.0	▲3.6
Registered electors		3,732		
Labour hold		Swing	▼19.0	

=== Avondale South ===
Avondale South
Party	Candidate	Votes	%	±%
Conservative	H. MacDonald	999	49.5	▼0.1
Labour	J. Malloy	551	27.3	▼0.4
SNP	M. Holman	341	16.9	▲7.8
SSLD	P. Ladybourn	126	6.2	▼7.3
Majority		448	22.2	▲0.3
Turnout		2,017	43.8	▲2.9
Registered electors		4,610		
Conservative hold		Swing	▼0.1	

=== Avondale North ===
Avondale North
Party	Candidate	Votes	%	±%
Conservative	A. Chalmers	1,102	50.4	▼2.6
Labour	J. Murphy	562	25.7	▲2.9
SNP	J. Wilson	366	16.7	▲8.1
SSLD	A. Ladybourn	156	7.1	▼8.4
Majority		540	24.7	▼5.5
Turnout		2,186	48.2	▲6.0
Registered electors		4,538		
Conservative hold		Swing	▼2.6	

=== Crosshouse ===
Crosshouse
Party	Candidate	Votes	%	±%
Labour	W. Docherty	951	59.2	▼4.8
SNP	J. MacQueen	637	39.7	▲17.1
Majority		314	19.5	▼21.9
Turnout		1,588	41.1	▲0.9
Registered electors		3,907		
Labour hold		Swing	▼4.8	
