= Colette Crabbé =

Belgian swimmer

Personal information
- Born: 1959 (age 66–67) Liège, Belgium

Sport
- Sport: Swimming

Colette Crabbé is a Belgian swimmer. Becoming Belgian champion in 400m freestyle in 1973, in 100m breaststroke in 1975, in 200 m breaststroke in 1974 and 1975, and in 400m individual medley in 1973-1976. She competed at the 1976 Summer Olympics where she competed in the 200 metre breaststroke.

She is mother of triathlete Claire Michel.
