= Lauri Siering =

American swimmer

Personal information
- Full name: Laura Gail Siering
- Nickname: "Lauri"
- National team: United States
- Born: February 23, 1957 (age 69) Pomona, California, U.S.
- Education: Univ. of Southern California; Modesto Junior College; Stanislaus State (Graduate)
- Occupations: Education, Schoolteacher, Asst. Principal
- Height: 5 ft 4 in (1.63 m)
- Weight: 126 lb (57 kg)

Sport
- Sport: Swimming
- Strokes: Breaststroke
- Club: Modesto Racquet Club Aquatics
- College team: Univ. of Southern California (USC)
- Coach: Bob Casci (Modesto Racquet Club); Lilian "Pokey" Watson (USC)
Medal record
Women's swimming
Representing the United States
Olympic Games
Silver medal – second place	1976 Montreal	4×100 m medley
Pan American Games
Gold medal – first place	1975 Mexico City	100 m breaststroke
Gold medal – first place	1975 Mexico City	200 m breaststroke

Laura Gail Siering (born February 23, 1957) is an American former competition swimmer who competed briefly for the University of Southern California, and represented the United States at the 1976 Summer Olympics in Montreal, Quebec, winning a silver medal swimming the breaststroke leg in the 4×100-meter medley relay. After graduating from Modesto's Fred C. Beyer High School, she graduated from Stanislaus College, and in the 1990s worked as a schoolteacher and assistant principal in greater Modesto.

== Early life ==
Siering was born February 23, 1957, to Jack and Lois Siering in Pomona, California, the eldest of four siblings. She began swimming at age nine with the Recreation Program at Temple City in greater Pomona, though by 1967 the family had moved to Modesto, California. By age 12, she had resumed swim training and competition, and beginning in the summer of 1971 she swam with the Modesto Racquet Club Aquatic program, where she was trained by Coach Bob Casci. Having enrolled when the school first opened in 1972, Siering graduated from Modesto's Fred C. Beyer High School in June 1975. While coaching the Modesto Raquet Club Aquatics program, Casci also coached swimming at Beyer High School, where Siering trained and competed with the boys' team. In 1976, Casci left to coach the Jersey Wahoos, and later founded Berkeley's Coast Line Casuals.

Siering's younger twin sisters were also active in swimming, though her younger brother was not. Her father Jack, an anesthesiologist, helped fund her travel to a number of domestic meets, and her mother Lois drove her and her younger sisters to many regional meets; her community also helped fund some of the costs of her competition and travel.

== Early AAU competition ==
At 17, at the April 1974 AAU Short Course Nationals in Dallas, Texas, Siering placed sixth in a field of the nation's top 100 swimmers in the 200-yard breaststroke with an AAU Pacific Association record time of 2:24.04, and seventh in the 100-yard breaststroke with a time of 1:07.61.

Representing Modesto Raquet Club Aquatics on April 3, 1976, at the 1976 AAU Swimming Championships in Modesto, California, Siering placed fourth in the 200-meter breaststroke with a time of 2:42.69. Siering suffered from asthma and hay fever during her competitive swimming years, and sometimes had trouble catching her breath after long workouts. In Olympic competition, she had to adapt to a different medication for her asthma, as her usual medication had been banned by the U.S. Olympic Committee. Siering's pre-Olympic training increased from 45 minutes three days a week to 3.5-5 hours a day, six days a week, and included weight training.

== International competition ==
In October 1975, shortly after graduating from high school, Siering won a gold medal in the 200-meter breaststroke at the seventh Pan American Games in Mexico with a time of 2:42.35, and another gold in the 100-meter breaststroke with a time of 1:15.17.

After graduating from Beyer High School in June 1975, Siering planned to train for a year with Coach Bob Casci at the Modesto Swim and Raquet Club. While training with the U.S. team at the United States Military Academy in West Point, New York, for a few months before the trip to Montreal for the 1976 Olympics, Siering swam a 1:04.7 for the 100-meter breaststroke, two-tenths of a second slower than the standing U.S. record of 1:04.56 in the event. In preparation for the Olympics, Siering was trained by U.S. Olympic Women's Head Coach Jack Nelson.

== 1976 Olympic trials ==
At the June 1976 U.S. Olympic trials in Long Beach, California, Siering swam a 1:14.46 in the 100-meter breaststroke final, winning the event and qualifying for a place on the U.S. Women's Olympic team. She also won the 200-meter breaststroke final with a time of 2:38.75. In both events, Marcia Morey of Mission Viejo placed second.

== 1976 Montreal Olympic silver medal ==
On July 18, 1976, Siering won a silver medal swimming the breaststroke leg for the second-place U.S. team in the women's 4×100-meter medley relay, together with Linda Jezek (backstroke), Camille Wright (butterfly), and Shirley Babashoff (freestyle). According to the Modesto Bee, Siering swam a personal best of 1:13.7 for her 100-meter breaststroke leg. Siering's 4×100-meter medley team swam a combined time of 4:14.55 and placed second to the East German team of Ulrike Richter, Hannelore Anke, Andre Pollack, and Kornelia Ender, which swam a combined time of 4:07.95 in the finals, finishing around 6.6 seconds ahead of the American team. By the late 1990s, allegations of steroid doping by members of the East German team had been confirmed. In interviews shortly after the Games, American swimmer Shirley Babashoff expressed concerns that members of the East German women's team had possibly taken anabolic steroids as part of their pre-Olympic training. In a July 23, 1976 interview with the Modesto Bee, Siering voiced similar concerns.

Siering also competed in the women's 100-meter breaststroke and 200-meter breaststroke at the 1976 Olympics, but did not advance to the finals in either event. In the 100-meter breaststroke semi-finals she swam a 1:14.84; although she finished in the highest place of any American swimmer, she placed 11th overall, and would have needed a time in the top eight to advance to the finals. German swimmer Hannelore Anke later placed first in the finals, having set a World and Olympic record of 1:10.86 in the preliminary heats. Russian swimmers took second and third place in the finals.

In the 200-meter breaststroke, Siering swam a 2:41.66 in the heat 2 preliminary, and did not advance to the semi-finals, as her time placed her 15th overall.

In late July–August 1977, while briefly representing the Santa Clara Swim Club, Siering won the 200- meter breaststroke event in a time of 2:43.16 at the Mission Viejo Invitational Swim Meet.

== Education and careers ==
=== University of Southern California ===
After the Olympics, beginning in 1976, Siering attended the University of Southern California on an athletic scholarship, where she was coached by Lilian "Pokey" Watson-Richardson. At an exhibition in Tokyo, Japan, in April 1976, as part of the University of Southern California team, Siering swam a 2:49.60 in the 200-meter breaststroke, placing second to Japan's Kazuyo Inabe, who swam a 2:36.30. Siering and the team travelled to Tokyo, Osaka, and Fukuoka as part of the tour. Siering left elite competitive swimming by 1979, after she left the University of Southern California.

=== Stanislaus State ===
After leaving the University of Southern California, Siering completed an Associate of Science at Modesto Junior College in Modesto in 1984. She later completed a four- year degree at nearby Stanislaus State in 1984, now known as California State University, Stanislaus in Turlock, California. During the 1980s, Siering was briefly married and had a daughter. Siering began a master's degree at Stanislaus State in sustainable agriculture, where she studied environmentally friendly agriculture, sometimes known as bio-intensive gardening, and took part in a field study with John Jeavons, executive director of the non-profit Ecology Action of Palo Alto.

In 1994, Siering worked as a special education teacher at Teel Middle School in Modesto, which has an address in Empire, California, about six miles east of Modesto. In September 1998, Siering served as an assistant principal at the newly opened Dennis G. Earl Elementary School in nearby Turlock, California, about 14 miles southeast of Modesto.

In December 1998, the U.S. Olympic Committee under Dick Schultz sought some form of additional recognition for the silver medal 4×100-meter medley relay team of Linda Jezek, Lauri Siering, Camille Wright, and Shirley Babashoff, after revelations that members of the East German medley team had used anabolic steroids. On December 12, 1998, Francois Gerard, International Olympic Committee Director, rejected proposals for recognition, which might have included marking the East German records with asterisks, giving out compensatory certificates, or withdrawing or reassigning the East German women's medals. In November 1998, former East German team coach Rolf Glazer admitted to providing performance- enhancing drugs to 1976 4×100 medley relay swimmer Andrea Pollock. According to Olympedia, after the reunification of East and West Germany in the 1990s, officials from East Germany admitted they had provided performance- enhancing drugs to the vast majority of their swimmers, including 1976 Olympic 4×100-meter medley relay breaststroker Hannelore Anke.

=== Honors ===
In November, 1973, Siering was named a co-winner of the Outstanding Swimming Award by the Modesto Swim and Raquet Club. In 1976, she was named a Sportsman of the Year in the Open Division at the Sportsmen of Stanislaus Annual Awards Banquet.

== See also ==
- List of Olympic medalists in swimming (women)
- Doping in East Germany
- List of University of Southern California people
