= Helen Burnham =

British swimmer

Personal information
- Born: 10 May 1956 (age 70) Bromley, London, England

Sport
- Sport: Swimming

Helen Blanche May Burnham (born 10 May 1956) is a British former swimmer. Burnham competed in the women's 100 metre breaststroke at the 1976 Summer Olympics. At the ASA National British Championships she won the 100 metres breaststroke title and the 200 metres breaststroke title in 1975.
