= Susan Sloan =

Canadian swimmer

Personal information
- Full name: Susan Estelle Sloan
- National team: Canada
- Born: April 5, 1958 (age 68) Stettler, Alberta
- Height: 1.71 m (5 ft 7 in)
- Weight: 61 kg (134 lb)

Sport
- Sport: Swimming
- Strokes: Freestyle, butterfly
- Club: Pacific Dolphins
Medal record
Women's swimming
Representing Canada
Olympic Games
Bronze medal – third place	1976 Montreal	4×100 m medley
World Championships (LC)
Bronze medal – third place	1978 West Berlin	4×100 m freestyle
Commonwealth Games
Gold medal – first place	1978 Edmonton	4×100 m freestyle

Susan Estelle Sloan (born April 5, 1958), later known by her married name Susan Kelsey, is a former Canadian competitive swimmer. Sloan won a bronze medal at the 1976 Summer Olympics in Montreal, by swimming the butterfly leg for the third-place Canadian team in the women's 4x100-metre medley relay, together with teammates Wendy Hogg (backstroke), Robin Corsiglia (breaststroke), and Anne Jardin (freestyle). At the 1978 World Championships in Berlin, she and her Canadian teammates won a bronze medal in the 4x100-metre freestyle relay.

In 2014, Sloan was inducted into the Alberta Sports Hall of Fame.

== See also ==
- List of Olympic medalists in swimming (women)
