= Melanie MacKay =

Canadian swimmer

Personal information
- Born: 16 August 1959 (age 66) Burlington, Ontario, Canada

Sport
- Sport: Swimming

Melanie MacKay (born 16 August 1959) is a Canadian former swimmer. She competed in the women's 200 metre breaststroke at the 1976 Summer Olympics in Montreal. She retired from age group coaching in August 2024, after 40 years.
