= 1977 East Kilbride District Council election =

1977 Scottish local government election

- 3 May 1977

All 15 seats to East Kilbride District Council 8 seats needed for a majority
	First party	Second party
Party	SNP	Conservative
Last election	7 seats, 36.9%	2 seats, 17.0%
Seats won	11	2
Seat change	▲4	Steady
Popular vote	13,805	6,678
Percentage	44.9%	21.7%
Swing	▲8.0%	▲4.7%
	Third party	Fourth party
Party	Labour	Independent
Last election	5 seats, 40.5%	1 seat, 4.2%
Seats won	1	1
Seat change	▼4	Steady
Popular vote	9,413	770
Percentage	30.6%	2.5%
Swing	▼9.9%	▼1.7%

Elections to East Kilbride District Council were held on 3 May 1977, on the same day as the other Scottish local government elections. This was the second election to the district council following the implementation of the Local Government (Scotland) Act 1973.

The election used the 15 wards created by the Formation Electoral Arrangements in 1974. Each ward elected one councillor using first-past-the-post voting.

SNP candidates gained control of the council after winning a majority.

== Results ==
1977 East Kilbride District Council election result
Party	Seats	Gains	Losses	Net gain/loss	Seats %	Votes %	Votes	+/−
SNP	11			▲4	73.3	44.9	13,805	▲8.0
Conservative	2			Steady	13.3	21.7	6,678	▲4.7
Labour	1			▼4	6.7	30.6	9,413	▼9.9
Independent	1			Steady	6.7	2.5	770	▼1.7
Communist	0	0	0	Steady	0.0	0.3	95	▼1.1
