= 1992 East Kilbride District Council election =

Eat Kilbride District Council election

← 1988	7 May 1992

All 16 seats to East Kilbride District Council 9 seats needed for a majority
- Registered: 64,170
- Turnout: 38.0%
	First party	Second party	Third party
	Lab	SNP	Con
Party	Labour	SNP	Conservative
Last election	14 seats, 51.6%	0 seats, 30.4%	2 seats, 9.7%
Seats won	12	2	2
Seat change	▼2	▲2	Steady
Popular vote	10,731	7,371	4,984
Percentage	44.2%	30.4%	20.5%
Swing	▼7.4	Steady	▲10.8
- The result of the election
Council Leader before election
Labour
Council Leader after election
Labour

Elections to East Kilbride District Council were held on 7 May 1992, on the same day as the other Scottish local government elections. This was the final election to the district council which was abolished in 1995 along with Hamilton District Council and Clydesdale District Council and, combined with part of the abolished City of Glasgow District Council, was replaced by South Lanarkshire Council following the implementation of the Local Government etc. (Scotland) Act 1994. The regional council, Strathclyde, was also abolished and the new unitary authority took on its responsibilities.

The election was also the last to use the 16 wards created by the Initial Statutory Reviews of Electoral Arrangements in 1980 without alterations. Each ward elected one councillor using first-past-the-post voting.

Labour maintained control of the district council despite a reduction in their vote share after winning 12 of the 16 seats – a decrease of two from the previous election. The Scottish National Party (SNP) regained a presence on the council as they gained two seats from Labour and came second in the popular vote. The remaining seats were won by the Conservatives who held both their seats.

== Results ==
1992 East Kilbride District election result
Party	Seats	Gains	Losses	Net gain/loss	Seats %	Votes %	Votes	+/−
Labour	12	0	2	▼2	75.0	44.2	10,731	▼7.4
SNP	2	2	0	▲2	12.5	30.4	7,371	Steady
Conservative	2	0	0	Steady	12.5	20.5	4,984	▲10.8
Liberal Democrats	0	0	0	Steady	0.0	5.1	1,236	▼1.1
Total	16						24,322	

== Ward results ==
=== Maxwellton ===
Maxwellton
Party	Candidate	Votes	%	±%
Labour	G. McKillop	942	60.6	▼3.0
Conservative	L. Kay	352	22.7	New
SNP	R. Burke	260	16.7	▼7.7
Majority		590	37.9	▼0.9
Turnout		1,554	42.5	▼7.0
Registered electors		3,660		
Labour hold		Swing	▼3.0	

=== Long Calderwood ===
Long Calderwood
Party	Candidate	Votes	%	±%
Labour	R. Boyle	666	50.3	▼6.5
SNP	J. McCann	464	35.0	▲3.6
Conservative	M. Oldenkamp	194	14.6	New
Majority		590	15.3	▼10.1
Turnout		1,324	37.9	▼11.7
Registered electors		3,494		
Labour hold		Swing	▼6.5	

=== Morrishall ===
Morrishall
Party	Candidate	Votes	%	±%
Labour	A. Dick	801	49.1	▼10.0
SNP	W. Arthur	574	35.2	▼5.2
Conservative	M. Gales	254	15.6	New
Majority		227	13.9	▼4.8
Turnout		1,629	38.3	▼9.1
Registered electors		4,264		
Labour hold		Swing	▼10.0	

=== Blacklaw ===
Blacklaw
Party	Candidate	Votes	%	±%
Labour	C. Robb	687	47.3	▼8.5
SNP	R. Littler	430	29.6	▲4.1
Conservative	W. Finnie	208	14.3	New
Liberal Democrats	A. Brash	127	8.7	▼9.6
Majority		257	17.7	▼12.6
Turnout		1,452	38.6	▼10.2
Registered electors		3,763		
Labour hold		Swing	▼6.3	

=== Calderglen ===
Calderglen
Party	Candidate	Votes	%	±%
Labour	H. H. Biggins	587	38.6	▼12.8
SNP	M. Gillespie	377	24.8	▲2.2
Conservative	A. Ferguson	311	20.4	New
Liberal Democrats	A. J. Sutherland	245	16.1	▼9.0
Majority		210	13.8	▼12.5
Turnout		1,520	38.9	▼4.3
Registered electors		3,913		
Labour hold		Swing	▼7.5	

=== Duncanrig ===
Duncanrig
Party	Candidate	Votes	%	±%
Labour	S. Crawford	765	54.4	▼11.7
SNP	G. Ferguson	490	34.9	▲1.5
Liberal Democrats	D. Service	141	10.0	New
Majority		275	19.5	▼13.2
Turnout		1,396	39.1	▼8.9
Registered electors		3,600		
Labour hold		Swing	▼11.7	

=== Westwoodhill ===
Westwoodhill
Party	Candidate	Votes	%	±%
Labour	W. G. Irvine	656	47.1	▼8.4
SNP	J. Anderson	592	42.5	▲4.4
Conservative	J. Davidson	143	10.3	New
Majority		64	4.6	▼12.8
Turnout		1,391	38.3	▼6.5
Registered electors		3,630		
Labour hold		Swing	▼6.4	

=== Hairmyres ===
Hairmyres
Party	Candidate	Votes	%	±%
SNP	D. Watson	566	34.3	▲7.3
Labour	E. McKenna	507	30.8	▼8.6
Conservative	M. Lang	455	27.6	▲5.5
Liberal Democrats	C. Linskey	120	7.3	▲1.1
Majority		59	3.5	N/A
Turnout		1,648	36.6	▼7.3
Registered electors		4,498		
SNP gain from Labour		Swing	▲7.9	

=== West Mains ===
West Mains
Party	Candidate	Votes	%	±%
Labour	W. McNab	711	47.0	▼2.3
SNP	W. Stenhouse	456	30.2	▲7.0
Conservative	E. Chalmers	263	17.4	▲6.4
Liberal Democrats	D. Service	78	5.2	New
Majority		255	16.8	▼9.3
Turnout		1,508	38.4	▼11.6
Registered electors		3,939		
Labour hold		Swing	▼4.6	

=== East Mains ===
East Mains
Party	Candidate	Votes	%	±%
Labour	H. Winslow	966	48.2	▼9.5
SNP	L. Leslie	491	24.5	▲2.4
Conservative	N. Craig	373	18.6	▲7.7
Liberal Democrats	S. Hamilton	175	8.7	New
Majority		475	23.7	▼11.9
Turnout		2,005	42.1	▼11.6
Registered electors		4,760		
Labour hold		Swing	▼5.9	

=== Kelvin ===
Kelvin
Party	Candidate	Votes	%	±%
Labour	J. Docherty	859	62.9	▲8.8
SNP	J. Wilson	500	36.6	▼9.1
Majority		359	26.3	▲17.9
Turnout		1,359	35.8	▼19.0
Registered electors		3,817		
Labour hold		Swing	▲8.8	

=== Lickprivick ===
Lickprivick
Party	Candidate	Votes	%	±%
Labour	A. Reid	706	54.6	▼3.6
SNP	D. Scott	505	39.0	▼2.6
Liberal Democrats	H. Henderson	82	6.3	New
Majority		201	15.6	▼1.0
Turnout		1,293	32.7	▼12.5
Registered electors		3,952		
Labour hold		Swing	▼3.6	

=== Headhouse ===
Headhouse
Party	Candidate	Votes	%	±%
Labour	J. McMonigle	642	49.2	▲2.3
SNP	J. Wilson	423	32.4	▼8.7
Conservative	J. Ash	156	12.0	New
Liberal Democrats	J. Rolland	82	6.3	▼5.1
Majority		219	16.8	▲11.1
Turnout		1,303	37.3	▼11.7
Registered electors		3,493		
Labour hold		Swing	▲5.5	

=== Avondale South ===
Avondale South
Party	Candidate	Votes	%	±%
Conservative	H. MacDonald	1,063	61.2	▲11.7
Labour	A. Kerr	343	19.8	▼7.5
SNP	C. Boyle	329	19.0	▲2.1
Majority		720	41.4	▲19.2
Turnout		1,735	38.3	▼5.5
Registered electors		4,535		
Conservative hold		Swing	▲11.7	

=== Avondale North ===
Avondale North
Party	Candidate	Votes	%	±%
Conservative	A. Chalmers	1,076	57.7	▲7.3
Labour	J. Malloy	373	20.0	▼5.7
SNP	C. Duke	292	15.7	▼1.0
Liberal Democrats	I. Norie	122	6.5	▼0.6
Majority		703	37.7	▲13.0
Turnout		1,863	39.6	▼8.6
Registered electors		4,702		
Conservative hold		Swing	▲7.3	

=== Crosshouse ===
Crosshouse
Party	Candidate	Votes	%	±%
SNP	A. Buchanan	622	46.3	▲6.6
Labour	R. Allan	520	38.7	▼20.5
Conservative	A. Robertson	136	10.1	New
Liberal Democrats	S. Scott	64	4.8	New
Majority		102	7.6	N/A
Turnout		1,342	32.4	▼8.7
Registered electors		4,150		
SNP gain from Labour		Swing	▲13.5	
