= Robin Corsiglia =

Canadian swimmer (born 1962)

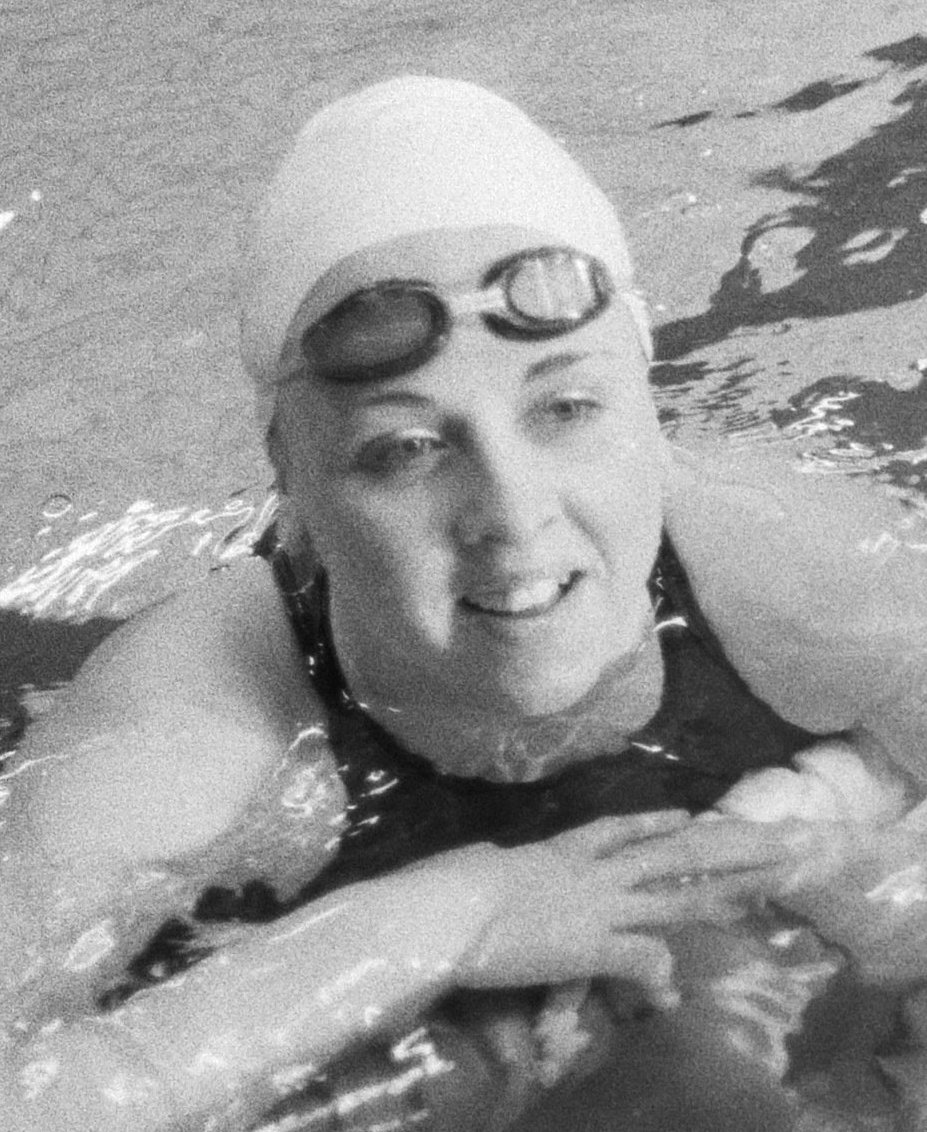

Personal information
- Full name: Robin Marie Corsiglia
- National team: Canada
- Born: August 12, 1962 (age 64) Cleveland, Ohio
- Height: 1.52 m (5 ft 0 in)
- Weight: 45.4 kg (100 lb)

Sport
- Sport: Swimming
- Strokes: Breaststroke
- Club: Pointe-Claire Swim Club
- College team: University of Southern California
Medal record
Women's swimming
Representing Canada
Olympic Games
Bronze medal – third place	1976 Montreal	4x100 m medley
Commonwealth Games
Gold medal – first place	1978 Edmonton	100 m breaststroke

Robin Marie Corsiglia (born August 12, 1962), later known by her married name Robin Scholefield, is a former competitive swimmer from Canada.

She represented Canada as a 13 year old at the 1976 Summer Olympics in Montreal, Quebec. Corsiglia won a bronze medal swimming the breaststroke leg of the women's 4x100-metre medley relay, together with her Canadian teammates Wendy Hogg (backstroke), Susan Sloan (butterfly), and Anne Jardin (freestyle). Individually, she also competed in the women's 100-metre breaststroke, finishing fourth in the event final.

Corsiglia attended the University of Southern California, and swam for the USC Trojans swimming and diving team.

She received her Phd in Clinical Psychology (1999) from the California School of Professional Psychology, Los Angeles and is a married mother of three and a sports psychologist at the University of Southern California - University Park Health Center in Los Angeles.

== See also ==
- List of Olympic medalists in swimming (women)
