= Ann Marshall =

American swimmer (born 1957)

Personal information
- Full name: Barbara Ann Marshall
- National team: United States
- Born: January 27, 1957 (age 69) Ann Arbor, Michigan, U.S.
- Height: 5 ft 10 in (1.78 m)
- Weight: 130 lb (59 kg)

Sport
- Sport: Swimming
- Strokes: Freestyle
- Club: Jack Nelson Swim Club
- College team: University of North Carolina 1980
- Coach: Frank Comfort (UNC)

Barbara Ann Marshall (born January 27, 1957) is an American former swimmer for the University of North Carolina, and a 1972 Munich Olympic 200-meter and 4x100-meter freestyle relay competitor. Notably in late August 1974, in a dual meet against American rival East Germany in Concord, California, Marshall swam on an American 4x100 meter freestyle relay team that set a world record in the event.

== Early life ==
Born in Ann Arbor, Michigan on January 27, 1957, Marshall grew up in Southeast Florida's coastal Sea Ranch Lakes, a Fort Lauderdale suburb, where she attended Fort Lauderdale's college preparatory program at the Pine Crest School, graduating in 1975. In addition to quality academics, Pine Crest also had an accomplished swimming program, recognized as the best in the county during Marshall's participation in the mid-1970's. Marshal swam for both Pine Crest's Swim Team, and the Jack Nelson Swim Team, both coached by former Olympian Jack Nelson

Marshall excelled in the 200-yard freestyle at an early age, taking a 1:56.4 in a meet in her first year at Pine Crest. Swimming again for Pine Crest in 1974, as a swimmer diverse in her stroke skills, she made the city's girl's competitive swimming honor roll for March 1974 with a 53.8 in the 100 freestyle, a winning 1:53.7 in the 200 freestyle, a winning 5:03.8 in the 500 freestyle, a 1:04 in the 100 butterfly, a 1:02.1 in the 100 backstroke, and as a member of a winning 400 freestyle relay. As a High School Senior, Marshall was a May 1975 All Broward County Swimmer in the 100 and 200-yard freestyle, and was also on a winning 400-yard freestyle relay team.

Her Broward All County first team times included a 1:51.1 for the 200-freestyle, and a 52.5 for the 100-freestyle. Her Pine Crest Coach Jack Nelson was a 1975 Broward County Coach of the Year. Her Pine Crest swim teammate Bonnie Brown was Broward County's 1975 Swimmer of the Year and would soon join her on North Carolina's swimming team in Marshall's second year. Like Marshall, Brown was an outstanding freestyle swimmer and would break the American record in the 100-meter freestyle in 1976.

== College career ==
As the first women's swimming scholarship athlete, from 1976 to 1980 she swam for the University of North Carolina varsity under 1976 Head Coach Jim Wood, and 1977-1980 Head Coach Frank Comfort, during a period when the women's team was exceptionally strong due to carefully targeted recruiting and the recent availability of scholarships for women's swimming. During her first year at Carolina in 1976, she won AIAW individual national titles in both the 200-yard backstroke and 200-yard freestyle. A strong performer in national competition, during her career at North Carolina, she earned All-American honors 18 times. The strong and well-balanced North Carolina women's team during Marshall's participation also featured 1976 800-meter Olympic bronze medalist Wendy Weinberg, and 1976 100-meter American record holder Bonnie Brown, with whom Marshal swam at Fort Lauderdale's Pine Crest School. In 1980, Sue Walsh, UNC Athletic Hall of Fame and 1983 Pan American Gold medalist, joined the team. A dominant regional power in their conference, and an emerging national power, between 1976 and 1985, the women's team at Carolina had nine consecutive top ten finishes in national team competition in the Association for Women's Athletics national championships and then NCAA national championships.

== 1972 Munich Olympics ==
=== Trials ===
At the 1972 U.S. Olympic trials to be held in Munich, Marshall was considered a serious underdog. Though rated only 35th in America in the 200-meter freestyle, she managed to complete her final qualifying heat with the third fastest time among the many top American women who competed against her, qualifying her for the American Olympic team. Aware of the considerable odds against her, Marshall had not yet applied for a passport in the month prior to the trials. As she competed with a number of nationally rated swimmers, two other Fort Lauderdale area residents who also swam with her at the Jack Nelson Swim Club, future 1972 Olympic gold medalist David Edgar an NCAA championship freestyle sprinter from the U. of Tennessee, and 1968 Canadian Olympic bronze medalist Marilyn Corson, a former Pine Crest swimmer, also made the trials.

=== 4x100-meter Olympic relay ===
At only 15, in August 1972, Marshall represented the United States in the Summer Olympics in Munich, Germany. In Olympic competition, to qualify for the finals she swam as anchor in the fourth position in the preliminary heats for what would later be the gold medal-winning U.S. team in the women's 4×100-meter freestyle relay, but did not receive a medal. Each country could have as many as six or seven swimmers designated as potential 4 x 100 meter relay participants, though only four would swim in a given heat. In the preliminary qualifying heat, Marshall swam as a substitute in the anchor position for designated relay swimmer Shirley Babashoff, a top performer, who would later be needed to swim in the final heat. In her career, Babashoff would capture nine Olympic medals with her combined participation in the 1972 and 1976 Olympics. Though she swam well, Marshall later noted she was quite nervous during her preliminary heat, as she had to struggle to remove her warm up clothes, T-shirt, and sneakers only a few minutes before having to swim her fourth position anchor leg swim. She had not completely shed her warm-up clothes and sneakers and ascended the starting block until the third position relay swimmer was well in sight. Under the international swimming rules in effect in 1972, only those relay swimmers who competed in the 4 x 100-meter relay event final which included Babashoff, not Marshall, received medals.

Though Marshal did not swim in the final, the American women's final combined relay time in the event, which took the gold was only .36 seconds slower than the East German team's silver medal second-place finish. Swimming anchor in the final in place of Marshall who anchored the preliminary, American Shirley Babashoff lost a slight lead on her first lap and did not catch her East German competitor Kornelia Ender till her last lap, though the American's combined time of 3:55.19 was a world record.

Individually, Marshall also competed in the women's 200-meter freestyle, and placed fourth in the event final with a time of 2:05.45.

=== 4 x 100-meter relay world record ===
At a high point in her swimming career on August 31, 1974, she swam on a world record breaking 4x100 free relay event in the 50-meter long course, in Concord, California with Kim Peyton, Kathy Heddy, and Shirley Babashoff, recording the record combined time of 3:51.99 before a crowd of 600 in a two-day dual meet between the American and East German women's teams in the Concord Community Pool. The new relay time broke the prior world record by around half a second. In a close match, the last swimmer on the East German women's relay team completed the relay only about two seconds slower than the last swimmer on the American women's relay team finishing with a combined team time of 3:53.91. Still somewhat diverse in her stroke skills, as she had been in high school, Marshall also placed fourth in the 200-meter backstroke with a 2:23.1.

After her swimming career, Marshall returned to Fort Lauderdale, and served as a client associate with Merrill Lynch. In 1988, she lived with her husband in Lauderdale-by-the-Sea.

=== Honors ===
She was made a member of the Atlantic Coast Conference (ACC) 50th Anniversary Team in 2002, inducted into the Broward County (Florida) Sports and North Carolina Swimming Halls of Fame. Her alma mater, Pine Crest School, named an award for female swimmers, The Ann Marshall Award, after her.

== See also ==
- List of Olympic medalists in swimming (women)
- List of University of North Carolina at Chapel Hill alumni
- World record progression 4 × 100 metres freestyle relay
