= Frank Comfort =

American swimming coach

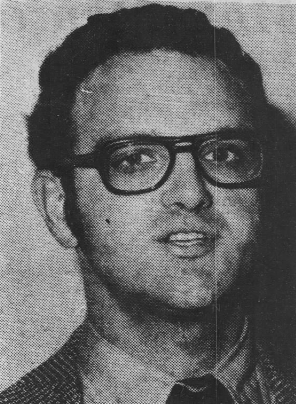
- Comfort circa 1977, UNC first year swim coach

Biographical details
- Born: December 20, 1945 (age 80); Harrisburg, Pennsylvania
- Education: Syracuse University

Playing career
- Positions: Syracuse (1964–67) freestyle middle distance

Coaching career (HC unless noted)
- 1967–1968: University of North Carolina; Freshman Coach
- 1968–1977: Johns Hopkins University
- 1970–1977: Homewood Aquatic Club; AAU Age group swimming
- 1977–2007: University of North Carolina

Head coaching record
- Overall: 501–146–1 .773 Win % (1977–2003, UNC); 82–26 .759 Win %, (Johns Hopkins)

Accomplishments and honors

Championships
- 1977 NCAA Team Championship (Johns Hopkins); 26 ACC championships 10 men 16 women (U. North Carolina)

Awards
- ACC Coach of Year; 4 for Men's Team; 10 for Women's Team (U. North Carolina)

Frank Rockwell Comfort (born December 20, 1945) was a competitive swimmer for Syracuse University and the head swim coach for the University of North Carolina from 1977 to 2007 where he led the Tarheels to 349 dual meet wins. Combined with his prior wins coaching Johns Hopkins University, in 2004 he reached 578 dual meet wins, a number that uniquely distinguished him as the coach with the most wins in collegiate swimming history. In the year before beginning his long service as coach for North Carolina, he led the Johns Hopkins Swim team to a 1977 NCAA National Championship. Comfort coached 8 Olympic participants, four women, and four men, primarily at the University of North Carolina.

== Early life and swimming ==
Comfort was born on December 20, 1945, to Robert and Francis Meck Comfort, an educator, and Syracuse University graduate, and grew up in Harrisburg, Pennsylvania. His father taught business administration as a professor at Shippensburg University in Pennsylvania. His mother served as the chief librarian at Harrisburg Area Community College. Swimming for Harrisburg, he qualified for the Pennsylvania State Swimming Meet in March 1963, by placing fourth in the 200-yard freestyle, and third in the 400-yard freestyle at the Eastern Regional Meet. Comfort also swam for Colonial Crest Swim Club of Harrisburg during his High School years and in July 1963 broke pool records in the 100 freestyle and butterfly events. In July 1964 in the summer after his High School Senior year, swimming for West Shore Swim Club, he won two events, the 100-meter backstroke, and the 100-meter butterfly in a time of 53.1 at a Tri-County Swim League Meet.

== College era swimming and coaching ==
He graduated Syracuse University with a Bachelor's in History in 1968, where he was a three-year letterman in swimming from 1964 to 1967. In competition he excelled in middle-distance events and occasionally swam the 500 freestyle. As a Syracuse college upperclassman in 1967, he also coached the Syracuse Jewish Community Center swim team, which had a wide range of age group swimmers. He received his master's degree in physical education from Carolina in 1968, and coached their freshman swimming team to a perfect 7–0 record as well as assisting with the Varsity team as a Student Coach.

== Coaching Johns Hopkins ==
Before assuming the position as head coach at Carolina, between 1968 and 1977 Comfort served as the head swimming and diving coach at NCAA Division III Johns Hopkins University in Baltimore, Md. In nine seasons, the team achieved a record of 82–36 in dual meets. Comfort led the Hopkins's Blue Jays to 8 Mid-American Conference (MAC) Championships, 4 Mason-Dixon Championships, two NCAA Runner-up finishes and most notably the 1977 NCAA Team Championship. While coaching at Hopkins, he also served as Director of Physical Education, Assistant Track Coach, and the Director of the Summer Athletic Program.

In his career with Hopkins, he produced 159 All-Americans, 22 individual national champions in individual events and one relay national champion during his nine-year tenure at Baltimore. He coached the Johns Hopkins women in their first two seasons to a 12–5 record and back-to-back MAC Championships, and was the first coach for the women's program. Upon leaving Hopkins in 1977, Comfort was replaced by Assistant Coach Tim Welsh. Comfort had also coached the Homewood AAU Aquatic club during his tenure at Hopkins, and had mentored nationally rated swimmers with the Homewood Aquatic team, Teresa Hecht, Nancy Thompson, 1976 Olympic medalist Wendy Weinberg, and Ellen Mangels.

== Coaching University of North Carolina ==
In the 30 years between May 1977 and July 2007, where he replaced Jim Wood as Head Coach, Comfort had an exceptional winning career at North Carolina. He led the university to 26 Atlantic Coast Conference (ACC) championships, consisting of 10 men's teams championships, and 16 women's team's championships. Comfort's women's team at Carolina finished in the NCAA's top 10 five times. Nearing the end of his tenure with the Tar Heels, by January 2003 he had won 500 dual meets and had achieved an exceptional career record of 501–146–1. Comfort remarked in 2003, that "Getting the 500th is a great tribute to a lot of great swimmers and divers who've competed for me at Johns Hopkins and Carolina over the past 35 years".

Comfort always noted that he stressed education first and swimming second. He required a minimum of three morning and six afternoon practices, rather than many programs that required five or six morning practices. He also established an Alumni Club for his swimmers to help build team loyalty and improve recruiting by creating a network of graduates who could look for top talent in their communities.

The swimmers and divers under Comfort's management won both at North Carolina and previously at Johns Hopkins University with a frequency and consistency unparalleled by any former swimming coach. Of his 565 career wins, 303 came while coaching men and 262 while coaching women. He also had great success with his athletes in classroom academics while away from the pool, and his swimmers were active in numerous leadership roles in their college communities.

=== Outstanding swimmers and Olympians ===
Among his outstanding career swimmers, he has coached eight Olympic participants, four men and four women, and three swimmers inducted into the North Carolina Swimming Hall of Fame, which include Sue Walsh, winner of 10 individual national championships, 1972 Olympian Ann Marshall, and Bonnie Brown, 1976 100-meter record holder, and the first female recipient of Carolina's Patterson Medal for the year's most outstanding senior athlete. The women's team was outstanding in the late 1970s, and also included 1976 Montreal Olympian breaststroker Janis Hape. While at the University of North Carolina, Comfort also coached 1984 American Olympic participant Chris Stevenson, 1992 and 1996 French Olympic team participant Yann DeFabrique, and 1992 Puerto Rican Olympic team participant David Monasterio. Another American Olympic team member included 1996 Atlanta Olympic medalist David Fox, who Comfort worked with during his time as a graduate student at the University of North Carolina and likely in subsequent years preparing for the 1996 Olympics.

=== International coaching ===
Comfort coached several American and foreign Olympians and NCAA, AIAW and U.S. swimming national champions. He served eight times as head coach or an assistant on international trips for the U.S. National Team and 10 times for U.S. teams on domestic trips. He was Head Coach of the U.S. National Team at the World Junior Championships and Goodwill Games, and served as the Sport Coordinator for the 1987 Swimming at U.S. Olympic Festival in North Carolina. Comfort was head coach for U.S. teams which competed against the Soviet Union in August 1982 in a dual meet in Knoxville, Tenn. This U.S. team, in May 1983 also competed in the Hapoel Games in Tel Aviv, Israel. He was an assistant coach for U.S. teams in the August 1981 World University Games in Bucharest, Romania, for the July 1982 U.S.-West German dual meet in Gainesville, Fla., as well as for the League of European Nations meet in Rome in August 1990.

=== Work in Eagle's Mere, PA, and retirement ===
In April 2006, Comfort retired from collegiate swim coaching, to become effective at the end of the 2006–07 swim season. Before fully retiring, by 1998 he spent time, likely summers in Sullivan County, Pennsylvania, in the Eagle's Mere area. His long serving assistant coach Rich DeSelm replaced him as Carolina's designated head coach on July 1, 2007. In his time away from collegiate coaching, he volunteered as an assistant basketball coach, and held a strength training program for both the boys' and girls' basketball teams at Pennsylvania's Sullivan County High School, and since 1967 held a position as an officer with the Sullivan County Scholarship Association. Since 1998, he was a member and was on the board of the Eagles Mere Community Church. Both his children, a son, and a daughter were University of North Carolina graduates.

As late as 2022, Comfort commented on the efforts of Sullivan County resident Mary Blondy to build a Sullivan county area fitness center, to be known as the Summitt Wellness Center, that would include a modern pool. Sullivan County is a highly rural, and lightly populated area where Comfort retired. In 2022, Comfort was still helping with Sullivan County's basketball team, and would make a 35-mile one-way drive to swim at a YMCA in a neighboring county.

== Honors ==
Befitting a coach with over 40 years of experience, and an unparallelled number of winning meets, Comfort was widely recognized in the swimming community. He was chosen as the ACC Coach of the Year for the University of North Carolina's Women's team 10 times (1982, 1984, 1985, 1992, 1993, 1995, 1996, 2000, 2001 and 2002) and as Coach of the Year for the Men's team four times (1991, 1993, 1996 and 1997). In 1979, he became the youngest coach to ever receive College Swimming Coaches Association of America's (CSCAA) Master Coach Award. He was inducted into the Maryland Swimming Hall of Fame in 1966 and the Johns Hopkins Athletic Hall of Fame in 1997. In 2007, he was named as a Carolina Priceless Gem, University of North Carolina's most distinguished athletics award, and was honored with the North Carolina High School Athletic Association Award of Distinction.

For achieving his record of winning meets, Comfort was selected by the College Swimming Coaches Association of American (CSCAA) for the list of the 100 greatest Coaches of the Century. In May 2011, Comfort was honored with the Charles McCafree Award by the College Swimming Coaches Association of America for an individual who achieved great success in life, and made great contributions to society and the sport of Aquatics.
