= Wendy Weinberg =

American swimmer

Wendy Weinberg Weil
Personal information
- National team: United States
- Born: Wendy Beth Weinberg; June 27, 1958 (age 68) Baltimore, Maryland, U.S.
- Height: 5 ft 6 in (1.68 m)
- Weight: 126 lb (57 kg)

Sport
- Sport: Swimming
- Strokes: Freestyle
- Club: Homewood Aquatics Club
- College team: University of Virginia; University of North Carolina
- Coach: Frank Comfort; Homewood Aquatic, UNC
Medal record
Women's swimming
Representing the United States
Olympic Games
Bronze medal – third place	1976 Montreal	800 m freestyle
Pan American Games
Gold medal – first place	1975 Mexico City	800 m freestyle
Summer Universiade
Bronze medal – third place	1977 Sofia	400 m freestyle
Maccabiah Games
Gold medal – first place	1973 Ramat Gan	800 m freestyle
Gold medal – first place	1977 Ramat Gan	200 m butterfly
Gold medal – first place	1977 Ramat Gan	200 m freestyle
Gold medal – first place	1977 Ramat Gan	4×100 m medley
Silver medal – second place	1977 Ramat Gan	100 m freestyle

Wendy Beth Weinberg Weil (née Weinberg; born June 27, 1958) is an American former competition swimmer for the University of Virginia who was a medalist at the 1976 Montreal Olympics, and both the Pan American, and Maccabiah Games. She earned a physical therapist's certificate from Emory University and as Wendy Weil began a practice as a physical therapist in the McLean, Virginia area around 1982.

Wendy Weinberg was born on June 27, 1958 in Baltimore, Maryland, and attended the Friends School of Baltimore, graduating in June 1976, shortly before attending the Montreal Olympics. Weil began swim training at the age of nine, but switched to a team coached by Frank Comfort at Baltimore's Johns Hopkins University where she would train full time with Comfort by the age of 14. During her High School years through the mid-1970's, she swam for winning coach Comfort's Homewood AAU Swim Club which met at Johns Hopkins, and would later swim with Comfort at the University of North Carolina.

== 1973 Maccabiah Games ==
At the age of around 15 at the 1973 Maccabiah Games in Israel, she won a gold medal in the 800-meter freestyle, as well as in the women's 200 m butterfly and the women's 400 m medley. According to Olympedia, she won a total of four gold medals and three silvers in the 1973 Maccabiah Games.

== 1975 Pan American Games ==
In 1975, she established an American record in the 200-meter butterfly, swimming it in 2:18.2 at the West German Bremen Swimfest. That year she also won a gold medal and set a new Pan American Games record in Mexico City in the 800-meter freestyle, winning it in 9:05.47.

== 1976 Olympic Bronze medal ==
At the 1976 Olympic trails, she placed second to Shirley Babashoff in the 800-meter free, qualifying her for the trials.

One month after graduating from the Friends School of Baltimore in June 1976, Weinberg represented the United States at the 1976 Summer Olympics in Montreal, Quebec. She won a bronze medal in the women's 800-meter freestyle placing third with a 8:42.60 that broke the previous Olympic record by nearly four seconds, following East German Petra Thumer (8:37.14), and American teammate Shirley Babashoff (8:37.59).

== Collegiate swimming ==
=== University of Virginia ===
After winning her 1976 Olympic bronze medal, Weinberg swam for the University of Virginia on a swimming scholarship, where she was an All American. Swimming for Virginia in 1977, she captured first place in the 50 and 1650 freestyle, and the 200 butterfly at the NCAA National Collegiate Athletic Association Championship. She was honored as an All American in all three individual events, as well as the 400-meter medley and 800-meter freestyle relays. For many years, she held two all-time top ten places at Virginia with a 4:53.52 in the 500-yard freestyle, and a 10:01.10 in the 1000-yard freestyle. A broken leg ended her swimming career in 1980.

=== North Carolina ===
She transferred to the University of North Carolina, to study sport's medicine, earning an MS at UNC Chapel Hill. She later completed a Graduate Certificate in Physical Therapy from Emory University.

=== 1977 Maccabiah games ===
During her collegiate years she competed at the 1977 Maccabiah Games (the "Jewish Olympics") in Ramat, Gan, Israel. Weinberg, who is Jewish, won six gold medals and two silver medals. Among her golds was a win in the 200 m freestyle (in 2:08.96), the 200 m butterfly, the 400 m freestyle, the 800 m freestyle, and a win in the 4×100-meter medley relay team which she was captain of (in 4:10.09). Her silver medals were in the 100 m freestyle and the 100 m butterfly.

== Later life ==
She is a certified athletic trainer, and has a graduate certificate in physical therapy, which has been her primary career. She coached swimming for a decade for two United States Swimming age-group teams in the McLean, Virginia area. A broken leg and shoulder injuries during her college years ended her swimming career, but diversified her athletic pursuits to include racquetball, tennis, kayaking, and cycling. She began a practice as a physical therapist around 1982 in the McLean, Virginia area under her married name, Wendy Weil, and had been in practice for 30 years by 2012.

== See also ==
- List of Olympic medalists in swimming (women)
- List of select Jewish swimmers
- List of University of North Carolina at Chapel Hill alumni
- List of University of North Carolina at Chapel Hill Olympians
- List of University of Virginia people
