= Ballerup =

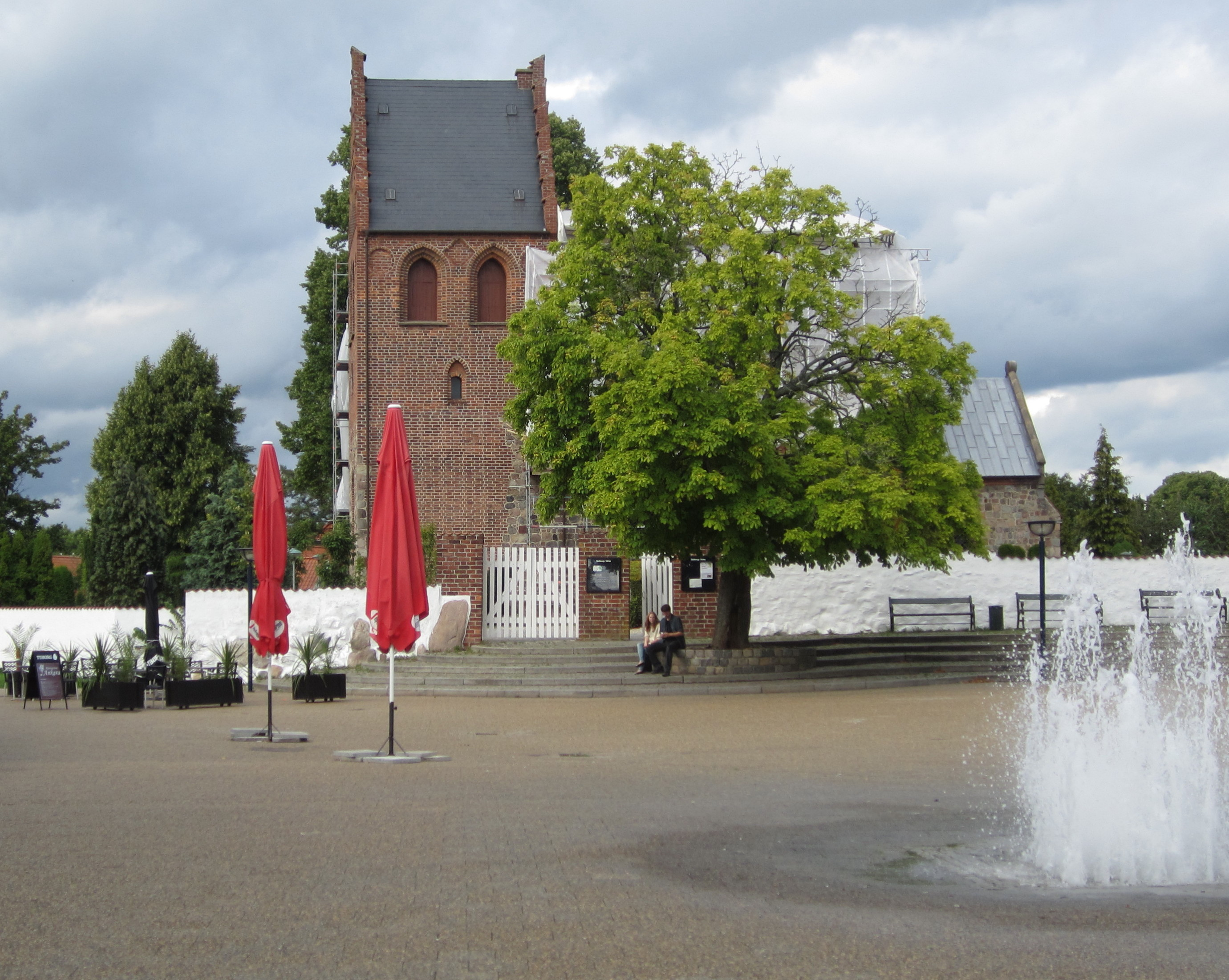
- Ballerup church

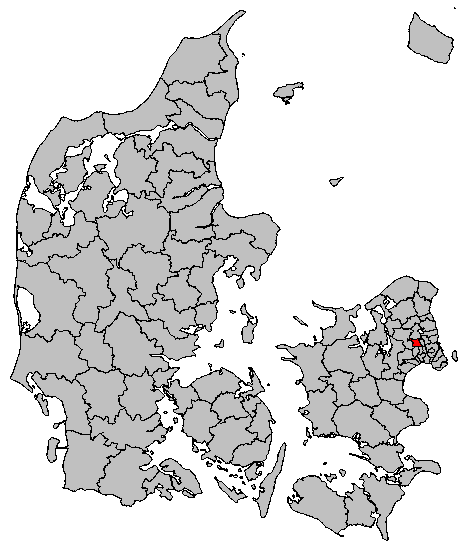
- Coordinates: 55°44′N 12°22′E
- Country: Denmark
- Region: Capital (Hovedstaden)
- Municipality: Ballerup

Area
  - Total: 15.7 km^{2} (6.1 sq mi)

Population (1. January 2026)
  - Total: 45,001
  - Density: 2,870/km^{2} (7,420/sq mi)
- Time zone: UTC+1 (Central Europe Time)
  - Summer (DST): UTC+2

Ballerup is a Danish town, seat of the Ballerup Municipality, in the Region Hovedstaden. There are approximately 25 schools in Ballerup Municipality. Ballerup has its own educational institution specialized in the study, training and research of music. It is twinned with East Kilbride in Scotland.

== Geography ==
The town is situated in the north-western suburbs of Copenhagen and is part of Copenhagen's urban area.

== Sport ==
=== Track cycling ===
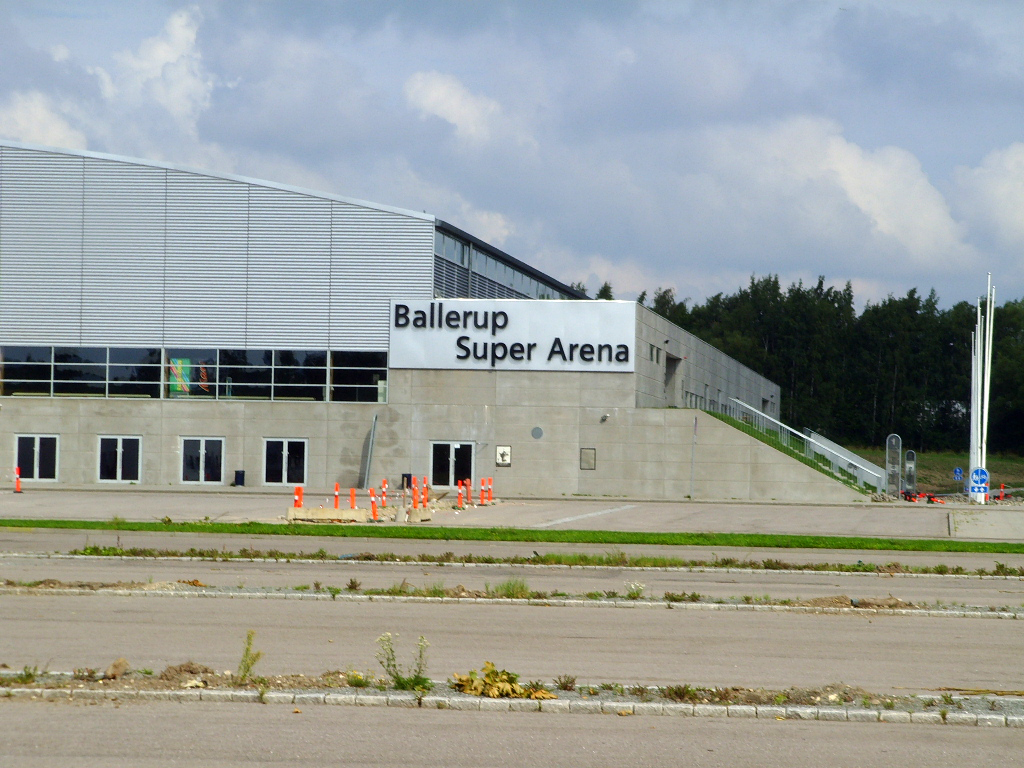
The Ballerup Super Arena from the outside

Ballerup Super Arena is the velodrome of Ballerup. It hosted the UCI Track Cycling World Championships in 2002, 2010 and 2024 as well as many rounds of the UCI Track Cycling World Cup Classics.

== Notable people ==
- Paul Høm (1905 in Ballerup – 1994), a Danish artist of religious paintings and brightly coloured stained glass windows
- Maiken Nedergaard (Born in 1956 in Ballerup), a Danish neuroscientist most well known for discovering the glymphatic system.

=== Sport ===
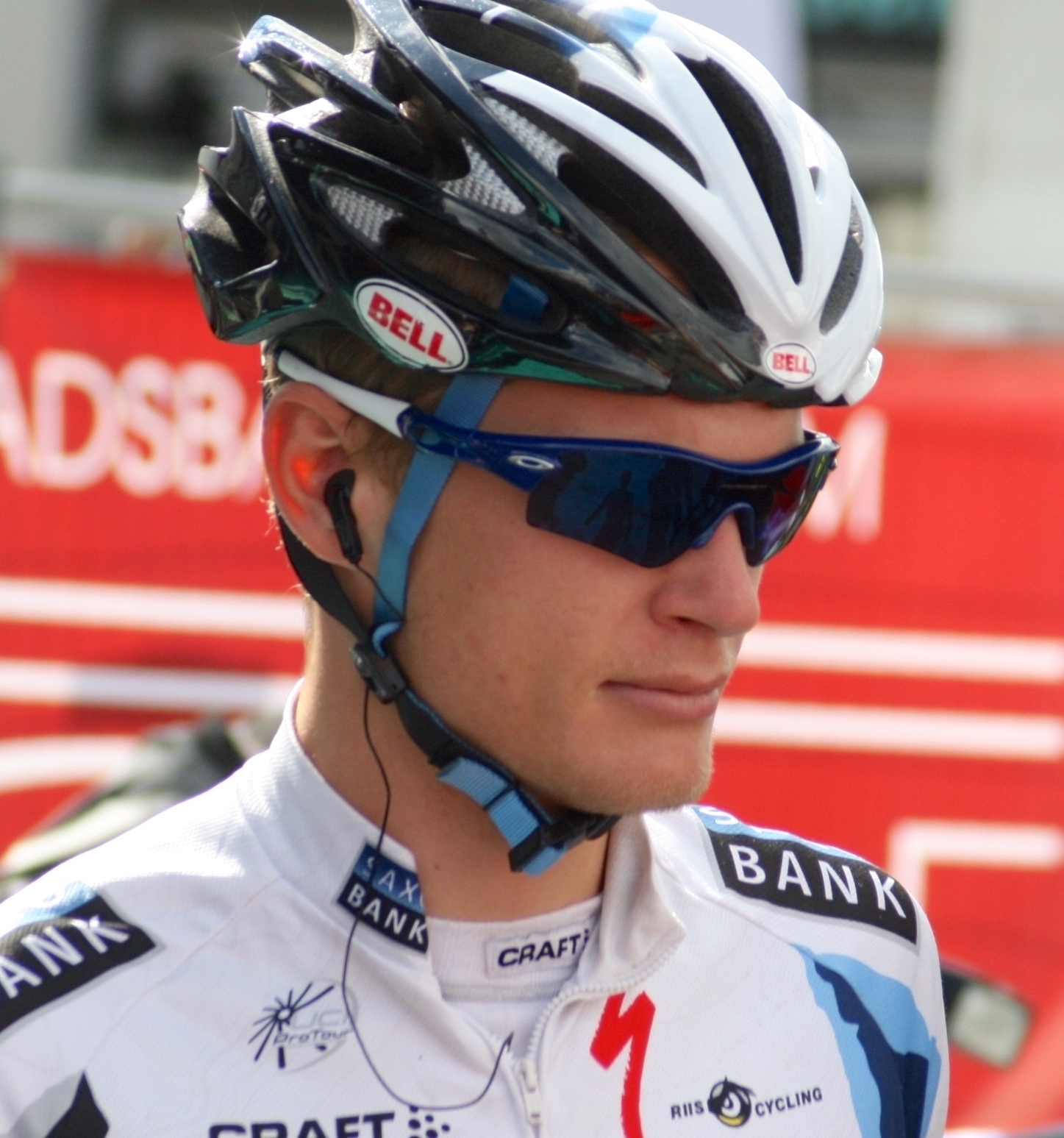
Matti Breschel, 2009

- Karin Deleurand (born 1959 in Ballerup), a Danish former swimmer, competed at the 1976 Summer Olympics
- Dennis Otzen Jensen (born 1974 in Ballerup), a Danish former freestyle and butterfly swimmer, competed at the 2000 Summer Olympics
- Matti Breschel (born 1984 in Ballerup), a Danish retired professional road racing cyclist
- Nikola Aistrup (born 1987 in Ballerup), a Danish former professional racing cyclist
- Nicolai Jørgensen (born 1991 in Ballerup), a Danish professional footballer with 240 club caps and 41 for Denmark
- Nicolai Boilesen (born 1992 in Ballerup), a Danish footballer with 140 club caps
- Julie Finne-Ipsen (born 1995 in Ballerup), a Danish badminton player
- Anastasija Marsenić (born 2003 in Ballerup), a Montenegrin handball player

== See also ==
- Ballerup station
- Ballerup Super Arena
