= List of University of North Carolina at Chapel Hill Olympians =

The following student-athletes, coaching staff, or alumni of the University of North Carolina at Chapel Hill have represented their country in the Olympic Games as athletes, coaching staff, press officers, or administrators.

An asterisk (*) denotes a coach or trainer.

== Berlin 1936 ==
Summer Games of the XI Olympiad, Berlin, Germany

Sport	Gender	Name	Team
Track and field	Men	Harry Williamson	(United States)

== London 1948 ==
Summer Games of the XIV Olympiad, London, United Kingdom

Sport	Gender	Name	Team
Track and field	Men	Bill Albans	(United States)
Track and field	Men	Chunk Simmons	(United States)

== Helsinki 1952 ==
Summer Games of the XV Olympiad, Helsinki, Finland

Sport	Gender	Name	Team
Track and field	Men	Chunk Simmons	(United States)

== Melbourne 1956 ==
Summer Games of the XVI Olympiad, Melbourne, Australia

Sport	Gender	Name	Team
Swimming	Women	Stan Tinkham *	(United States)
Wrestling	–	Perrin Henderson	(United States)

== Rome 1960 ==
Summer Games of the XVII Olympiad, Rome, Italy

Sport	Gender	Name	Team
Track and field	Men	Jim Beatty	(United States)

== Tokyo 1964 ==
Summer Games of the XVIII Olympiad, Tokyo, Japan

Sport	Gender	Name	Team
Basketball	–	Larry Brown	(United States)
Basketball	–	John Lacey *	(United States)
Swimming	Men	Thompson Mann	(United States)
Swimming	Men	Philip Riker	(United States)

== Mexico City 1968 ==
Summer Games of the XIX Olympiad, Mexico City, Mexico

Sport	Gender	Name	Team
Basketball	–	Charlie Scott	(United States)

== Munich 1972 ==
Summer Games of the XX Olympiad, Munich, West Germany

Sport	Gender	Name	Team
Basketball	–	Bobby Jones	(United States)
Basketball	–	John Lacey *	(United States)
Swimming	Women	Ann Marshall	(United States)

== Montreal 1976 ==
Summer Games of the XXI Olympiad, Montreal, Canada

Sport	Gender	Name	Team
Basketball	Men	Walter Davis	(United States)
Basketball	Men	Phil Ford	(United States)
Basketball	Men	Mitch Kupchak	(United States)
Basketball	Men	Tom LaGarde	(United States)
Basketball	Men	Dean Smith *	(United States)
Basketball	Men	Bill Guthridge *	(United States)
Basketball	Women	Trish Roberts	(United States)
Swimming	Women	Janis Hape	(United States)
Swimming	Women	Wendy Weinberg	(United States)
Track and field	Men	Charles Foster	(United States)

== Los Angeles and Sarajevo 1984 ==
Summer Games of the XXIII Olympiad, Los Angeles, California, United States and Winter Games of the XXIII Olympiad, Sarajevo, Yugoslavia

Sport	Gender	Name	Team
Baseball	–	B.J. Surhoff	(United States)
Baseball	–	Scott Bankhead	(United States)
Basketball	Men	Michael Jordan	(United States)
Basketball	Men	Sam Perkins	(United States)
Field hockey	Women	Karen Shelton	(United States)
Swimming	Men	Chris Stevenson	(United States)

- Rick Brewer was a press officer.

== Seoul and Calgary 1988 ==
Summer Games of the XXIV Olympiad, Seoul, South Korea and Winter Games of the XXIV Olympiad, Calgary, Canada

Sport	Gender	Name	Team
Basketball	Men	J.R. Reid	(United States)
Basketball	Women	Sylvia Hatchell *	(United States)
Cycling	Women	Danute Bankaitis-Davis	(United States)
Field hockey	Women	Marcia Pankratz	(United States)

- Press officer: Dave Lohse.

== Barcelona and Albertville 1992 ==
Summer Games of the XXV Olympiad, Barcelona, Spain and Winter Games of the XXV Olympiad, Albertville, France

Sport	Gender	Name	Team
Basketball	Men	Michael Jordan	(United States)
Basketball	Men	Henrik Rödl	(Germany)
Fencing	Men	John Friedberg	(United States)
Swimming	Men	Yann DeFabrique	(France)
Swimming	Men	David Monasterio	(Puerto Rico)
Track and field	Women	Sharon Couch	(United States)
Wrestling	–	Kendall Cross	(United States)

- Press officer: Frank Zang

== Lillehammer 1994 ==
Winter Games of the XXVI Olympiad, Lillehammer, Norway

- Press officer: Frank Zang

== Atlanta 1996 ==
Summer Games of the XXVI Olympiad, Atlanta, Georgia, United States

Sport	Gender	Name	Team
Fencing	Women	Nhi Lan Le	(United States)
Field hockey	Women	Marcia Pankratz	(United States)
Field hockey	Women	Leslie Lyness	(United States)
Field hockey	Women	Cindy Werley	(United States)
Field hockey	Women	Laurel Hershey	(United States)
Field hockey	Women	Kelli James	(United States)
Field hockey	Women	Liz Tchou	(United States)
Handball	Men	John Keller	(United States)
Handball	Men	Steve Penn	(United States)
Handball	Women	Chryss Watts	(United States)
Soccer	Men	Eddie Pope	(United States)
Soccer	Women	Laurie Gregg *	(United States)
Soccer	Women	Mia Hamm	(United States)
Soccer	Women	April Heinrichs *	(United States)
Soccer	Women	Kristine Lilly	(United States)
Soccer	Women	Tracy Noonan	(United States)
Soccer	Women	Cindy Parlow	(United States)
Soccer	Women	Tiffany Roberts	(United States)
Soccer	Women	Tisha Venturini	(United States)
Soccer	Women	Carla Werden	(United States)
Soccer	Women	Staci Wilson	(United States)
Swimming	Men	Yann DeFabrique	(France)
Swimming	Men	David Fox	(United States)
Track and field	Men	Ken Harnden	(United States)
Track and field	Men	Allen Johnson	(United States)
Track and field	Men	Eddie Neufville	(United States)
Track and field	Women	Joan Nesbit	(United States)
Track and field	Women	Lynda Lipson	(United States)
Track and field	Women	Tisha Waller	(United States)
Wrestling	–	Kendall Cross	(United States)

- Full-time employees: Dave Lohse, Chris Schleter; Olympic Broadcasting Organization: Kevin Best; Organizing Committee: Donald Lockerbie; Press officer: Frank Zang; Team physician: Tim Taft.

== Sydney 2000 ==
Summer Games of the XXVII Olympiad, Sydney, Australia

Sport	Gender	Name	Team
Basketball	Men	Vince Carter	(United States)
Soccer	Women	Lorrie Fair	(United States)
Soccer	Women	Laurie Gregg *	(United States)
Soccer	Women	Mia Hamm	(United States)
Soccer	Women	April Heinrichs *	(United States)
Soccer	Women	Kristine Lilly	(United States)
Soccer	Women	Siri Mullinix	(United States)
Soccer	Women	Cindy Parlow	(United States)
Soccer	Women	Carla Werden	(United States)
Track and field	Men	Dominic Demeritte	(United States)
Track and field	Men	Ken Harnden	(United States)
Track and field	Men	Allen Johnson	(United States)
Track and field	Men	Curtis Johnson	(United States)
Track and field	Men	Eddie Neufville	(United States)
Track and field	Women	LaTasha Colander-Richardson	(United States)
Track and field	Women	Sharon Couch	(United States)
Track and field	Women	Nadine Faustin	(United States)
Track and field	Women	Nicole Gamble	(United States)
Track and field	Women	Monique Hennagan	(United States)
Track and field	Women	Lynda Lipson	(United States)

- Full-time employee: Chris Schleter; Olympic Broadcasting Organization: Kevin Best; Organizing Committee: Donald Lockerbie.

== Salt Lake City 2002 ==
Winter Games of the XXVIII Olympiad, Salt Lake City, United States

- Full-time employee: Chris Schleter. Olympic Broadcasting Organization: Kevin Best.

== Athens 2004 ==
Summer Games of the XXVIII Olympiad, Athens, Greece

Sport	Gender	Name	Team
Baseball	–	Andrew Miller	(United States)
Basketball	Men	Larry Brown *	(United States)
Basketball	Men	Roy Williams *	(United States)
Soccer	Women	Tracy Bates-Leon *	(United States)
Soccer	Women	Mia Hamm	(United States)
Soccer	Women	April Heinrichs *	(United States)
Soccer	Women	Kristine Lilly	(United States)
Soccer	Women	Heather O'Reilly	(United States)
Soccer	Women	Cindy Parlow	(United States)
Soccer	Women	Catherine Reddick	(United States)
Soccer	Women	Lindsay Tarpley	(United States)
Softball	–	Natalie Anter	(Italy)
Track and field	Men	Dominic Demeritte	(United States)
Track and field	Men	Vikas Gowda	(India)
Track and field	Men	Allen Johnson	(United States)
Track and field	Women	LaTasha Colander-Richardson	(United States)
Track and field	Women	Crystal Cox	(United States)
Track and field	Women	Nadine Faustin	(United States)
Track and field	Women	Shalane Flanagan	(United States)
Track and field	Women	Laura Gerraughty	(United States)
Track and field	Women	Monique Hennagan	(United States)
Track and field	Women	Tisha Waller	(United States)

- Full-time employee: Chris Schleter; Organizing Committee: Donald Lockerbie.

== Turin 2006 ==
Winter Games of the XXIX Olympiad, Turin, Italy

Full-time employee: Chris Schleter.

== Beijing 2008 ==
Summer Games of the XXIX Olympiad, Beijing, China

Sport	Gender	Name	Team
Field hockey	Women	Kate Barber	(United States)
Field hockey	Women	Rachel Dawson	(United States)
Field hockey	Women	Katelyn Falgowski	(United States)
Field hockey	Women	Jesse Gey	(United States)
Field hockey	Women	Carrie Lingo	(United States)
Field hockey	Women	Amy Tran	(United States)
Soccer	Men	Dax McCarty	(United States)
Soccer	Women	Lori Chalupny	(United States)
Soccer	Women	Robyn Gale	(Canada)
Soccer	Women	Tobin Heath	(United States)
Soccer	Women	Heather O'Reilly	(United States)
Soccer	Women	Lindsay Tarpley	(United States)
Soccer	Women	Kacey White	(United States)
Track and field	Men	Dominic Demeritte	(The Bahamas)
Track and field	Men	Vikas Gowda	(India)
Track and field	Women	Blake Russell	(United States)
Track and field	Women	Erin Donohue	(United States)
Track and field	Women	Shalane Flanagan	(United States)
Track and field	Women	Nadine Faustin-Parker	(Haiti)
Track and field	Women	Alice Schmidt	(United States)

== London 2012 ==
Summer Games of the XXX Olympiad, London, England

Sport	Gender	Name	Team
Field hockey	Women	Rachel Dawson	(United States)
Field hockey	Women	Katelyn Falgowski	(United States)
Field hockey	Women	Amy Swensen	(United States)
Field hockey	Women	Illse Davids	(South Africa)
Soccer	Women	Robyn Gayle	(Canada)
Soccer	Women	Tobin Heath	(United States)
Soccer	Women	Heather O'Reilly	(United States)
Track and field	Men	Vikas Gowda	(India)
Track and field	Women	Shalane Flanagan	(United States)
Track and field	Women	Alice Schmidt	(United States)
Track and field	Women	Ola Sesay	(Sierra Leone)

== Rio 2016 ==
Summer Games of the XXXI Olympiad, Rio de Janeiro, Brazil

Sport	Gender	Name	Team
Basketball	Men	Harrison Barnes	(United States)
Basketball	Women	LaToya Pringle Sanders	(Turkey)
Field hockey	Women	Jackie Briggs	(United States)
Field hockey	Women	Rachel Dawson	(United States)
Field hockey	Women	Katelyn Falgowski	(United States)
Field hockey	Women	Kelsey Kolojejchick	(United States)
Field hockey	Women	Caitlin Van Sickle	(United States)
Soccer	Women	Katie Bowen	(New Zealand)
Soccer	Women	Crystal Dunn	(United States)
Soccer	Women	Whitney Engen	(United States)
Soccer	Women	Tobin Heath	(United States)
Soccer	Women	Meghan Klingenberg	(United States)
Soccer	Women	Allie Long	(United States)
Soccer	Women	Ashlyn Harris	(United States)
Soccer	Women	Heather O'Reilly	(United States)
Track and field	Men	Vikas Gowda	(India)
Track and field	Women	Shalane Flanagan	(United States)

== Tokyo 2020 ==
Summer Games of the XXXIII Olympiad, Tokyo, Japan

Sport	Gender	Name	Team
Baseball	Men	Tim Federowicz	(United States)
Baseball	Men	Ryder Ryan	(United States)
Diving	Men	Anton Down-Jenkins	(New Zealand)
Diving	Women	Aranza Vázquez	(Mexico)
Rugby	Women	Naya Tapper	(United States)
Soccer	Women	Katie Bowen	(New Zealand)
Soccer	Women	Lucy Bronze	(United Kingdom)
Soccer	Women	Crystal Dunn	(United States)
Soccer	Women	Tobin Heath	(United States)
Soccer	Women	Lotte Wubben-Moy	(United Kingdom)
Track and field	Men	Kenny Selmon	(United States)
Rhythmic gymnastics	Women	Camilla Feeley	(United States)
