= Lisa Borsholt =

Canadian swimmer (born 1962)

Personal information
- Born: 5 April 1962 (age 64) Vancouver, British Columbia, Canada

Sport
- Sport: Swimming
- Strokes: Breaststroke
Medal record
Women's swimming
Representing Canada
Commonwealth Games
Gold medal – first place	1978 Edmonton	200 m breaststroke
Universiade
Bronze medal – third place	1983 Edmonton	200 m breaststroke

Lisa Anne Borsholt (born 5 April 1962) is a Canadian former swimmer. She competed at the 1976 Summer Olympics and the 1984 Summer Olympics.
