= Carola Nitschke =

East German swimmer

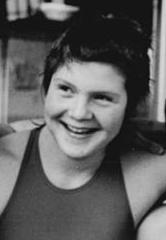
- Carola Nitschke in 1976

Personal information
- Born: 1 March 1962 (age 64) Berlin, Germany
- Height: 1.72 m (5 ft 8 in)
- Weight: 62 kg (137 lb)

Sport
- Sport: Swimming
- Club: SC Dynamo Berlin
Medal record
Representing East Germany
Olympic Games
Gold medal – first place	1976 Montreal	4×100 m medley
European Championships
Gold medal – first place	1977 Jönköping	4×100 m medley
Silver medal – second place	1977 Jönköping	100 m breaststroke

Carola Nitschke (later Beraktschjan, born 1 March 1962) is a retired East German swimmer. She competed at the 1976 Summer Olympics in the 100 m and 200 m breaststroke and finished in fourth and sixth place, respectively. She also won a gold medal in the 4 × 100 m medley relay, though she swam only in a preliminary round. Shortly before the Olympics she set world records in the 4 × 100 m medley relay and 100 m breaststroke. She was only fourteen at the time. Next year she won a gold and a silver medal in these events at the 1977 European Aquatics Championships.

Later she admitted to taking performance-enhancing drugs as part of the East German doping program; she gave up her medals and asked to remove her name from the competition records.
