= Marina Yurchenya =

Ukrainian swimmer

Personal information
- Born: November 9, 1959 (age 66)

Sport
- Sport: Swimming
- Strokes: Breaststroke
Medal record
Representing the Soviet Union
Olympic Games
Silver medal – second place	1976 Montreal	200 m breaststroke
European Championships
Bronze medal – third place	1974 Vienna	200m breaststroke

Marina Yurchenya (born 9 November 1959) is a Soviet former breaststroke swimmer who competed in the 1976 Summer Olympics.
