= Karin Deleurand =

Danish swimmer

Personal information
- Born: 7 May 1959 (age 67) Ballerup, Denmark

Sport
- Sport: Swimming

Karin Deleurand (born 7 May 1959) is a Danish former breaststroke swimmer. She competed in two events at the 1976 Summer Olympics.
