= Susan Walsh (swimmer) =

American swimmer

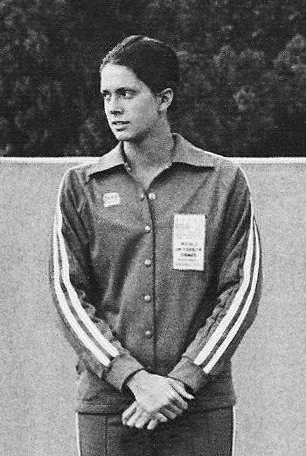
- Walsh at the 1981 Universiade

Personal information
- Full name: Susan Walsh
- Nickname: "Sue"
- National team: United States
- Born: 1962 (age 63–64) Hamburg, New York, U.S.

Sport
- Sport: Swimming
- Strokes: Backstroke
- College team: University of North Carolina
- Coach: Frank Comfort (UNC)
Medal record
Women's swimming
Representing the United States
World Championships
Silver medal – second place	1982 Guayaquil	4×100 m medley
Bronze medal – third place	1982 Guayaquil	100 m backstroke
Pan American Games
Gold medal – first place	1983 Caracas	4×100 m medley
Gold medal – first place	1983 Caracas	100 m backstroke
Silver medal – second place	1983 Caracas	200 m backstroke
Universiade
Silver medal – second place	1983 Edmonton	4x100 m medley
Bronze medal – third place	1981 Bucharest	100 m backstroke
Bronze medal – third place	1981 Bucharest	200 m backstroke
Bronze medal – third place	1983 Edmonton	100 m backstroke
Bronze medal – third place	1983 Edmonton	200 m backstroke

Susan Walsh (born 1962), also known by her married name Susan Stankavage, is an American former competition swimmer who won two medals at the 1982 World Aquatics Championships. She qualified for the 1980 Summer Olympics in the 100-meter backstroke, but could not compete because of their United States-led boycott of the Soviet-hosted games. She was 0.01 seconds short of qualifying for the 1984 Olympics in the same event.

== Biography ==
Walsh was born in Hamburg, New York, as the youngest of five children and started swimming because of her father Bob, a swimming official. She graduated from the Mount Mercy Academy and then from the University of North Carolina (1984), with a degree in business administration and accounting. At North Carolina, she swam under Head Coach Frank Comfort, who won an exceptional number of career meets, winning over 500 in his first 30 years as a coach. In 1987 she became an assistant swimming coach and in February 1989 started working at the Educational Foundation, better known as the Rams Club.

In 2003, she was inducted to the North Carolina Sports Hall of Fame. In the 2000s, she was still competing in swimming in the masters category. In 2007, she set six world records in the 45–49 age group at the 2007 United States Master's Swimming Championships.

== Family ==
She was married to Scott Stankavage, a former American football quarterback, from 1986 to 1997. They had three children: Sarah and Shelby are swimmers, and Shawn plays football.

== See also ==
- List of World Aquatics Championships medalists in swimming (women)
