= East Kilbride (district) =

Former local government area in Scotland

Coordinates: 55.70°N 4.15°W

- District
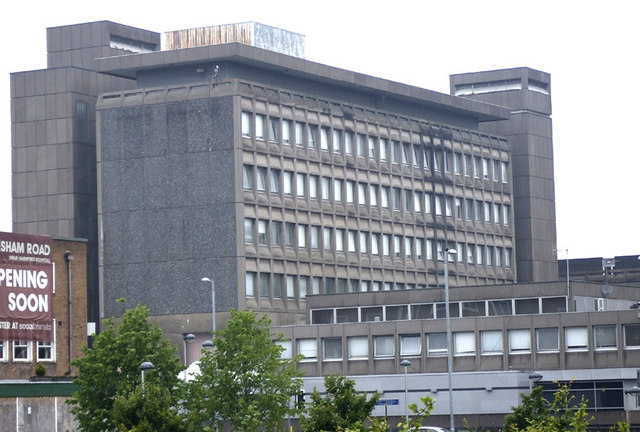
- Civic Centre, Andrew Street, East Kilbride

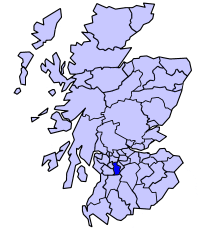
- East Kilbride district within Scotland
- Population
  - 1994: 82,777
- History
  - Created: 16 May 1975
  - Abolished: 31 March 1996
  - Succeeded by: (Part of) South Lanarkshire
- Status: District
- Government: East Kilbride District Council
  - HQ: East Kilbride

East Kilbride (Scottish Gaelic: Cille Bhrìghde an Ear, Scots: East Kirkbride) was a local government district in the Strathclyde region of Scotland from 1975 to 1996, lying to the south of the regional capital Glasgow.

== History ==
The district was created in 1975 under the Local Government (Scotland) Act 1973, which established a two-tier structure of local government across mainland Scotland comprising upper-tier regions and lower-tier districts. East Kilbride was one of nineteen districts created within the region of Strathclyde. The district covered parts of three former districts from the historic county of Lanarkshire, all of which were abolished at the same time:

- East Kilbride Burgh
- Fourth District (Avondale electoral division only)
- Eighth District (the parts of High Blantyre, Cambuslang South, and Carmunnock electoral divisions lying within areas previously electorally grouped with East Kilbride New Town).

The district was one of five in Strathclyde's Lanark sub-region, and took its name from the district's main town, being the new town of East Kilbride. The district also contained the rural area to the south of East Kilbride itself, which included the small town of Strathaven and the villages of Chapelton, Glassford and Thorntonhall.

The district was abolished in 1996 under the Local Government etc. (Scotland) Act 1994 which replaced regions and districts with unitary council areas. South Lanarkshire council area was formed covering the districts of Clydesdale, Hamilton, and parts of the City of Glasgow district.

== Political control ==
The first election to the district council was held in 1974, initially operating as a shadow authority alongside the outgoing authorities until it came into its powers on 16 May 1975. Political control of the council from 1975 was as follows:

Party in control	Years
No overall control	1975–1977
SNP	1977–1980
Labour	1980–1996

== Premises ==
The council was based at the Civic Centre at the corner of Andrew Street and Cornwall Street in East Kilbride, which had been built in 1968 for the former East Kilbride Town Council. The successor South Lanarkshire Council continues to use the building as offices, but has its headquarters at the Lanark County Buildings in Hamilton.

== See also ==
- 1974 East Kilbride District Council election
- 1984 East Kilbride District Council election
- 1988 East Kilbride District Council election
- 1992 East Kilbride District Council election
- Subdivisions of Scotland
