= Gabriele Askamp =

German swimmer (born 1955)

Personal information
- Born: 12 July 1955 (age 71) Bremerhaven, Germany

Sport
- Sport: Swimming

Gabriele Askamp (born 12 July 1955) is a German former swimmer. She competed in two events at the 1976 Summer Olympics.
