= Linda Jezek =

American swimmer

Personal information
- Full name: Linda Louise Jezek
- National team: United States
- Born: March 10, 1960 (age 66) Palo Alto, California, US
- Height: 5 ft 8 in (1.73 m)
- Weight: 128 lb (58 kg)
- Spouse: David Paul Wittwer (m. 1990)
- Children: 4

Sport
- Sport: Swimming
- Strokes: Backstroke
- Club: Santa Clara Swim Club (SCSC); Mission Viejo Nadadores (MVN) After 1978
- College team: Stanford University
- Coach: Mitch Ivey (SCSC); Mark Schubert (MVN); J. Gaughran, Claudia Kolb, H. Dietz (Stanford)
Medal record
Women's swimming
Representing the United States
Silver medal – second place	Montreal 1976	4x100 m medley relay
World Championships
Gold medal – first place	1978 Berlin	100 m backstroke
Gold medal – first place	1978 Berlin	200 m backstroke
Gold medal – first place	1978 Berlin	4x100 m medley
Silver medal – second place	1975 Cali	4x100 m medley
Pan American Games
Gold medal – first place	1979 San Juan	100 m backstroke
Gold medal – first place	1979 San Juan	200 m backstroke
Gold medal – first place	1979 San Juan	4x100 m medley

Linda Louise Jezek (born March 10, 1960) an American former competition swimmer, known by her married name Linda Wittwer after September 1990, competed for Stanford University, and was a 1976 Montreal Olympic silver medalist in the 4x100 Medley relay. She is a former American and world record-holder in backstroke events.

== Early life and swimming ==
Linda Jezek was born March 10, 1960, in Palo Alto, California, to Shirley and Earl D. Jezek, a pilot for Trans-World Airlines, and graduated Homestead High School in Cupertino. Her father Earl had formerly swum backstroke for the strong program at Ohio State. She grew up primarily in Los Altos, and around the age of 12 swam for the Mountain View Dolphins, but by 1975 did her training with the highly competitive Santa Clara Swim Club where she received much of her training from their new head coach Mitch Ivey, a former Olympic backstroke silver and bronze medalist. Former Olympic medalist Claudia Kolb was an assistant coach at Santa Clara by 1975, and may also have worked with Jezek.

By the summer of 1978, Jezek was training at the pool five hours a day, split into a morning and afternoon session with an hour of strength training three times a week. In June 1978, she nearly swept the Santa Clara Junior Olympic meet, winning six events including the 100-meter Butterfly with a time of 1:05.91, and the 200 freestyle with a time of 2:09.58.

Jezek won the Amateur Athletic Union U.S. Senior National 100-meter backstroke event in both 1975 and 1976.

== 1976 Montreal Olympics ==
Jezek placed first in the 100-meter backstroke at the U.S. Olympic trials in 1976, and placed third in the 200-meter backstroke at the trials, but did not swim the event at the 1976 Montreal Olympics.

Jezek was a member of the second-place U.S. team in the 4×100-meter medley relay at the 1976 Summer Olympics that took the silver medal in Montreal, Quebec, where the U.S. Women's team swam a combined time of 4:14.55. Jezek swam the opening backstroke leg of the relay in the finals.

In the Women's 100-meter 1976 Olympic backstroke event, Jezek slipped during the start of her semi-final heat on July 20, 1976, recovered her form late, and finished 11th overall with a 1:06.01, unable to record a time that would qualify her for the finals. As expected in the 100-meter backstroke finals, German swimmer Ulrike Richter won the race, with a 1:01.83, and German teammate Birgit Treiber placed second for the silver with a 1:03.41.

=== Stanford University ===
In the fall of 1978, Jezek began swimming on scholarship for the outstanding women's swim program at Stanford University, where the head coaches included Jim Gaughran through 1979. Former 1968 Olympic individual medley gold medalist Claudia Kolb Thomas was listed as the Stanford women's Head swim coach through 1980 and had worked as a Santa Clara Swim Club assistant coach at least by 1975. Both Holger Dietz (1980–1981) and George Haines (1981–1982) were also listed as official women's head coaches during Jezek's tenure as a Stanford swimmer.

During her time with the team from 1978 to 1982, the Stanford women won the AIAW National Championship in the 1979–1980 season under Coach Claudia Kolb, never lost more than 1 dual meet per year and finished ranked in the top 3 in AIAW or NCAA competition each year. In 1979, Jezek set an AIAW Collegiate conference record in the 50-yard backstroke with a time of 26.00 seconds. She maintained a 3.0 grade point average as a Stanford undergraduate despite the demands of her sport. As a freshman on March 16, 1979, she won two AIAW titles at the Large College National Swimming and Diving Championships in Pittsburgh, including an AIAW record in the 100 breaststroke of 55.69, though she already held the American record in the 100 breaststroke having formerly swum a 54.94 with the Santa Clara Swim Club. When the Stanford Women's team won the 1980 AIAW national team championship, Jezek earned 5 All American honors. Deciding to prepare full-time for the 1980 Olympics after completing her freshman year at Stanford, she trained with Mark Schubert at the Mission Viejo Nadadores pool facilities, averaging 12,000 to 14,000 meters a day in two sessions.

=== International competition highlights ===
Jezek set the 200-meter backstroke world record (long course) on August 28, 1978, at a meet with a time of 2:11.93 at the World Championships in West Berlin, Germany.

Jezek won a silver medal in the 4x100 Medley Relay at the 1975 World Aquatics Championships in Cali, Colombia. In a banner year in international competition, she won three gold medals at the 1978 World Championships in West Berlin in the 100-meter backstroke, 200-meter backstroke in world record time, and the 4x100-meter medley relay. In 1979, Jezek won three gold medals at the Pan American games in 100-meter backstroke, the 200-meter backstroke, and the 4x100-meter medley. Jezek enjoyed dancing, water skiing, and racquetball as recreational pursuits, but gave up snow skiing during her Olympic training.

=== Swimming retirement ===
Partly influenced by her disappointment with America's boycott of the 1980 Moscow Olympics, Jezek retired from competitive swimming around January 1981, after competing well for Stanford through the Fall, 1980 swimming semester. She attended the U.S. post-Olympic trials in Irvine in 1980, winning two backstroke events, but not matching that year's Olympic record times. In the summer of 1981, she did promotional work for ASICS Sports's Diana line of swim suits, coached a small age group team which met at Stanford and planned to continue working towards a degree in Communications at Stanford, graduating around 1984.

Jezek married David Paul Wittwer, a chiropractor with a practice in Belmont, California, on September 30, 1990, at Congress Springs Vineyard in Saratoga, California, and planned to live in San Carlos, California. They had four children as of 2002.

=== Honors ===
In December 1978, she was voted the 1978 Northern California Athlete of the Year by the Northern California Award's Board, part of the Citizen's Saving Athletic Foundation, and in April 1987, was admitted to the Fremont Union High School District Hall of Fame. In a somewhat more noteworthy honor, she was inducted into the "George F. Haines International Swim Center Hall of Fame" in 2002.

=== Post-swimming career ===
In 1990, Jezek worked as an AT&T Account Executive where she did Market Research, and later co-chaired WATT, a group for Women employees at AT&T, short for Women at AT&T.

== See also ==
- List of Olympic medalists in swimming (women)
- List of Stanford University people
- List of World Aquatics Championships medalists in swimming (women)
- World record progression 200 metres backstroke

Records
Preceded by Birgit Treiber	Women's 200-meter backstroke world record-holder (long course); August 28, 1978 – July 27, 1980	Succeeded by Rica Reinisch
