= Dacyl Pérez =

Venezuelan swimmer

Personal information
- Born: 3 June 1959 (age 67)

Sport
- Sport: Swimming

Dacyl Pérez (born 3 June 1959) is a Venezuelan former swimmer. She competed in three events at the 1976 Summer Olympics.
