= Swimming at the 1968 Summer Olympics – Men's 200 metre individual medley =

Men's 200 metre individual medley at the Games of the XIX Olympiad
- Venue: Alberca Olímpica Francisco Márquez
- Dates: 19 October 1968 (heats); 20 October 1968 (final)
- Competitors: 46 from 27 nations
- Winning time: 2:12.0 OR

Medalists
1st place, gold medalist(s)		Charlie Hickcox	United States
2nd place, silver medalist(s)		Greg Buckingham	United States
3rd place, bronze medalist(s)		John Ferris	United States

The men's 200 metre individual medley event at the 1968 Olympic Games took place between 19 and 20 October. This swimming event used medley swimming. Because an Olympic size swimming pool is 50 metres long, this race consisted of four lengths of the pool. The first length was swum using the butterfly stroke, the second with the backstroke, the third length in breaststroke, and the fourth freestyle. Unlike other events using freestyle, swimmers could not use butterfly, backstroke, or breaststroke for the freestyle leg; most swimmers use the front crawl in freestyle events anyway.

Silver medalist Greg Buckingham's younger brother, Lindsey, went on to fame as a member of the rock group Fleetwood Mac.

== Results ==
=== Heats ===
Heat 1

Rank	Athlete	Country	Time	Note
1	Charlie Hickcox	United States	2:16.1	
2	Péter Lázár	Hungary	2:17.1	
3	Lars Kraus Jensen	Denmark	2:21.2	
4	Zbigniew Pacelt	Poland	2:23.3	
5	Guðmundur Gíslason	Iceland	2:24.1	
6	Andrey Dunayev	Soviet Union	2:25.9	
7	Francisco Ramis	Puerto Rico	2:31.9	
8	Rubén Guerrero	El Salvador	2:37.5	

Heat 2

Rank	Athlete	Country	Time	Note
1	George Smith	Canada	2:16.4	
2	Mike Holthaus	West Germany	2:17.5	
3	Frank Wiegand	East Germany	2:18.0	
4	Ronnie Wong	Hong Kong	2:36.1	
5	Donnacha O'Dea	Ireland	2:36.6	

Heat 3

Rank	Athlete	Country	Time	Note
1	John Ferris	United States	2:14.6	
2	Reinhard Merkel	West Germany	2:17.8	
3	Hans Ljungberg	Sweden	2:17.8	
4	Yulyan Rusev	Bulgaria	2:22.7	
5	Raymond Terrell	Great Britain	2:23.5	
6	Olle Ferm	Sweden	2:27.5	
7	Lee Tong-shing	Chinese Taipei		DQ

Heat 4

Rank	Athlete	Country	Time	Note
1	Vladimir Kravchenko	Soviet Union	2:18.6	
2	István Szentirmay	Hungary	2:21.0	
3	Angel Chakarov	Bulgaria	2:24.0	
4	José Joaquín Santibáñez	Mexico	2:24.6	
5	Karl Byrom	Australia	2:28.0	
6	Chan King-ming	Chinese Taipei	2:44.9	

Heat 5

Rank	Athlete	Country	Time	Note
1	Sandy Gilchrist	Canada	2:16.8	
2	Juan Carlos Bello	Peru	2:17.5	
3	Juan Fortuny	Spain	2:20.6	
4	François Simons	Belgium	2:22.5	
5	Rafael Hernández	Mexico	2:24.7	
6	Salvador Vilanova	El Salvador	2:33.8	
7	Bob Loh	Hong Kong	2:39.3	

Heat 6

Rank	Athlete	Country	Time	Note
1	Greg Buckingham	United States	2:15.6	
2	Michele D'Oppido	Italy	2:18.5	
3	Ken Campbell	Canada	2:20.9	
4	Eduardo Alanís	Mexico	2:23.0	
5	Gershon Shefa	Israel	2:26.6	
6	Peter Schmid	Austria	2:36.4	
7	Friedrich Jokisch	El Salvador	2:41.6	

Heat 7

Rank	Athlete	Country	Time	Note
1	Jürgen Schiller	West Germany	2:20.8	
2	Martyn Woodroffe	Great Britain	2:22.0	
3	Jacek Krawczyk	Poland	2:23.8	
4	Tony Asamali	Philippines	2:24.6	
5	José Martínez	Cuba	2:31.4	
6	Andrew Loh	Hong Kong	2:42.0	

=== Final ===
Rank	Athlete	Country	Time	Notes
1	Charlie Hickcox	United States	2:12.0	OR
2	Greg Buckingham	United States	2:13.0	
3	John Ferris	United States	2:13.3	
4	Juan Carlos Bello	Peru	2:13.7	
5	George Smith	Canada	2:15.9	
6	Sandy Gilchrist	Canada	2:16.6	
7	Mike Holthaus	West Germany	2:16.8	
8	Péter Lázár	Hungary	2:18.3	

Key: OR = Olympic record
