= Swimming at the 1972 Summer Olympics – Men's 400 metre individual medley =

Men's 400 metre individual medley at the Games of the XX Olympiad
- Venue: Olympia Schwimmhalle
- Dates: 30 August 1972 (heats & final)
- Competitors: 32 from 21 nations
- Winning time: 4:31.98 OR

Medalists
1st place, gold medalist(s)		Gunnar Larsson	Sweden
2nd place, silver medalist(s)		Tim McKee	United States
3rd place, bronze medalist(s)		András Hargitay	Hungary

The men's 400 metre individual medley event at the 1972 Summer Olympics took place August 30. This swimming event used medley swimming. Because an Olympic size swimming pool is 50 metres long, this race consisted of eight lengths of the pool. The first two lengths were swum using the butterfly stroke, the second pair with the backstroke, the third pair of lengths in breaststroke, and the final two were freestyle. Unlike other events using freestyle, swimmers could not use butterfly, backstroke, or breaststroke for the freestyle leg; most swimmers use the front crawl in freestyle events.

== Final with controversial margin ==
The final was won by Gunnar Larsson, who succeeded over second-placed Tim McKee by two thousandths of a second.. This margin in effect brought about a change in the competition, so that no swimming competition henceforward would have to be decided by a margin less than a hundredth of a second.

== Results ==
=== Heats ===
Heat 1

Rank	Athlete	Country	Time	Notes
1	András Hargitay	Hungary	4:37.51	
2	Christian Lietzmann	East Germany	4:44.47	
3	Roger van Hamburg	Netherlands	4:50.70	
4	José Luis Prado	Mexico	4:54.49	
5	Barry Prime	Great Britain	4:57.77	
6	Jairulla Jaitulla	Philippines	5:05.48	

Heat 2

Rank	Athlete	Country	Time	Notes
1	Gunnar Larsson	Sweden	4:34.99	
2	John McConnochie	New Zealand	4:49.89	
3	Valentyn Partyka	Soviet Union	4:50.03	
4	David Brumwell	Canada	4:52.41	
5	Jiro Sasaki	Japan	4:53.65	
6	Antônio Azevedo	Brazil	4:57.27	
7	Hsu Tung-hsiung	Chinese Taipei	5:09.56	

Heat 3

Rank	Athlete	Country	Time	Notes
1	Steve Furniss	United States	4:39.33	
2	Ricardo Marmolejo	Mexico	4:45.20	
3	Bertram Türpe	East Germany	4:46.55	
4	Neil Martin	Australia	4:49.85	
5	Csaba Sós	Hungary	4:52.89	
6	Sverre Kile	Norway	4:59.72	
7	Guðmundur Gíslason	Iceland	5:03.54	

Heat 4

Rank	Athlete	Country	Time	Notes
1	Tim McKee	United States	4:40.78	
2	Graham Windeatt	Australia	4:42.16	
3	Mikhail Sukharev	Soviet Union	4:43.13	
4	Hans-Joachim Geisler	West Germany	4:48.57	
5	Mauro Calligaris	Italy	4:52.02	
6	Mike Holthaus	West Germany	4:58.19	

Heat 5

Rank	Athlete	Country	Time	Notes
1	Bengt Gingsjö	Sweden	4:38.05	
2	Gary Hall	United States	4:38.95	
3	Wolfram Sperling	East Germany	4:42.75	
4	Jorge Delgado Jr.	Ecuador	4:45.25	
5	Bruce Featherston	Australia	4:47.33	
6	Zbigniew Pacelt	Poland	4:55.38	

=== Final ===
Rank	Athlete	Country	Time	Notes
1	Gunnar Larsson	Sweden	4:31.98(1)	OR
2	Tim McKee	United States	4:31.98(3)	OR
3	András Hargitay	Hungary	4:32.70	
4	Steve Furniss	United States	4:35.44	
5	Gary Hall, Sr.	United States	4:37.38	
6	Bengt Gingsjö	Sweden	4:37.96	
7	Graham Windeatt	Australia	4:40.39	
8	Wolfram Sperling	East Germany	4:40.66	

Key: OR = Olympic record
