= Swimming at the 1968 Summer Olympics – Men's 400 metre individual medley =

Men's 400 metre individual medley at the Games of the XIX Olympiad
- Venue: Alberca Olímpica Francisco Márquez
- Dates: 22 October 1968 (heats); 23 October 1968 (final)
- Competitors: 35 from 22 nations
- Winning time: 4:48.4

Medalists
1st place, gold medalist(s)		Charlie Hickcox	United States
2nd place, silver medalist(s)		Gary Hall, Sr.	United States
3rd place, bronze medalist(s)		Michael Holthaus	West Germany

The men's 400 metre individual medley event at the 1968 Summer Olympics took place on 22–23 October. This swimming event used medley swimming. Because an Olympic size swimming pool is 50 metres long, this race consisted of eight lengths of the pool. The first two lengths were swum using the butterfly stroke, the second pair with the backstroke, the third pair of lengths in breaststroke, and the final two were freestyle. Unlike other events using freestyle, swimmers could not use butterfly, backstroke, or breaststroke for the freestyle leg; most swimmers use the front crawl in freestyle events.

== Results ==
=== Heats ===
Heat 1

Rank	Athlete	Country	Time	Note
1	Andrey Dunayev	Soviet Union	5:01.9	
2	Martyn Woodroffe	Great Britain	5:03.9	
3	Eduardo Alanís	Mexico	5:14.9	
4	Jacek Krawczyk	Poland	5:15.1	
5	José Martínez	Cuba		DQ

Heat 2

Rank	Athlete	Country	Time	Note
1	Greg Buckingham	United States	4:57.3	
2	Rafael Hernández	Mexico	5:01.1	
3	Hans Ljungberg	Sweden	5:06.1	
4	Vladimir Kravchenko	Soviet Union	5:08.7	
5	Tomas Becerra	Colombia	5:09.7	
6	Miguel Torres	Spain	5:12.7	
7	Guðmundur Gíslason	Iceland	5:20.2	
8	Raúl Villagómez	Mexico	5:24.7	

Heat 3

Rank	Athlete	Country	Time	Note
1	Charlie Hickcox	United States	4:56.2	
2	Reinhard Merkel	West Germany	5:00.6	
3	Bernhard Mock	West Germany	5:07.1	
4	Péter Lázár	Hungary	5:10.6	
5	Angel Chakarov	Bulgaria	5:10.9	
6	Ken Campbell	Canada	5:19.6	
7	Gershon Shefa	Israel	5:22.6	
8	Lee Tong-shing	Chinese Taipei	5:50.0	

Heat 4

Rank	Athlete	Country	Time	Note
1	Mike Holthaus	West Germany	5:00.8	
2	George Smith	Canada	5:04.4	
3	Yulyan Rusev	Bulgaria	5:07.0	
4	Lars Kraus Jensen	Denmark	5:12.7	
5	Zbigniew Pacelt	Poland	5:18.6	
6	Raymond Terrell	Great Britain	5:19.5	
7	Francisco Ramis	Puerto Rico	5:30.9	
8	Antonio Cruz	Guatemala	5:31.1	

Heat 5

Rank	Athlete	Country	Time	Note
1	Gary Hall	United States	4:56.2	
2	Sandy Gilchrist	Canada	4:57.5	
3	Karl Byrom	Australia	5:11.9	
4	Michele D'Oppido	Italy	5:16.4	
5	Jacques Henrard	Belgium	5:17.0	
6	Olle Ferm	Sweden	5:18.9	

=== Final ===
Rank	Athlete	Country	Time	Notes
1	Charlie Hickcox	United States	4:48.4	
2	Gary Hall, Sr.	United States	4:48.7	
3	Michael Holthaus	West Germany	4:51.4	
4	Greg Buckingham	United States	4:51.4	
5	Sandy Gilchrist	Canada	4:56.7	
6	Reinhard Merkel	West Germany	4:59.8	
7	Andrey Dunayev	Soviet Union	5:00.3	
8	Rafael Hernández	Mexico	5:04.3	
