= Swimming at the 1972 Summer Olympics – Men's 200 metre individual medley =

Men's 200 metre individual medley at the Games of the XX Olympiad
- Venue: Olympia Schwimmhalle
- Dates: 3 September 1972 (heats & final)
- Competitors: 40 from 26 nations
- Winning time: 2:07.17 WR

Medalists
1st place, gold medalist(s)		Gunnar Larsson	Sweden
2nd place, silver medalist(s)		Tim McKee	United States
3rd place, bronze medalist(s)		Steve Furniss	United States

The men's 200 metre individual medley event at the 1972 Olympic Games took place September 3, 1972. This swimming event used medley swimming. Because an Olympic size swimming pool is 50 metres long, this race consisted of four lengths of the pool. The first length was swum using the butterfly stroke, the second with the backstroke, the third length in breaststroke, and the fourth freestyle. Unlike other events using freestyle, swimmers could not use butterfly, backstroke, or breaststroke for the freestyle leg; most swimmers use the front crawl in freestyle events anyway.

== Results ==
=== Heats ===
Heat 1

Rank	Athlete	Country	Time	Notes
1	Wolfram Sperling	East Germany	2:12.87	
2	Thomas Aretz	West Germany	2:13.19	
3	Bertram Türpe	East Germany	2:16.54	
4	Hsu Tung-hsiung	Chinese Taipei	2:18.34	
5	José Joaquín Santibáñez	Mexico	2:19.47	
6	Amin Ahmed Adel Youssef	Egypt	2:24.61	

Heat 2

Rank	Athlete	Country	Time	Notes
1	András Hargitay	Hungary	2:10.88	
2	Bruce Featherston	Australia	2:15.18	
3	Clay Evans	Canada	2:15.19	
4	David Brumwell	Canada	2:16.84	
5	Guðmundur Gíslason	Iceland	2:20.00	
6	James Findlay	Australia	2:20.08	
7	Ronnie Wong	Hong Kong	2:34.82	

Heat 3

Rank	Athlete	Country	Time	Notes
1	Gunnar Larsson	Sweden	2:09.70	
2	Klaus Steinbach	West Germany	2:13.84	
3	Doug Jamison	Canada	2:17.71	
4	Antônio Azevedo	Brazil	2:19.41	
5	Marian Slavic	Romania	2:19.98	
6	Roy Chan	Singapore	2:24.43	
7	Barry Prime	Great Britain	2:18.84	DQ

Heat 4

Rank	Athlete	Country	Time	Notes
1	Tim McKee	United States	2:10.44	
2	Juan Carlos Bello	Peru	2:11.70	
3	David Wilkie	Great Britain	2:13.25	
4	John McConnochie	New Zealand	2:15.04	
5	Andreas Weber	West Germany	2:16.17	
6	Neil Martin	Australia	2:16.24	
7	François van Kruisdijk	Netherlands	2:17.14	

Heat 5

Rank	Athlete	Country	Time	Notes
1	Steve Furniss	United States	2:09.97	
2	Hans Ljungberg	Sweden	2:12.46	
3	Valentyn Partyka	Soviet Union	2:13.24	
4	Ricardo Marmolejo	Mexico	2:15.82	
5	Zbigniew Pacelt	Poland	2:17.35	
6	Bruno Bassoul	Lebanon	2:27.78	
7	Chiang Jin Choon	Malaysia	2:32.67	

Heat 6

Rank	Athlete	Country	Time	Notes
1	Gary Hall	United States	2:09.85	
2	Mikhail Sukharev	Soviet Union	2:11.91	
3	Christian Lietzmann	East Germany	2:13.42	
4	Jiro Sasaki	Japan	2:16.56	
5	Jairulla Jaitulla	Philippines	2:17.23	
6	Lorenzo Marugo	Italy	2:19.00	

=== Final ===
Rank	Athlete	Country	Time	Notes
1	Gunnar Larsson	Sweden	2:07.17	WR
2	Tim McKee	United States	2:08.37	
3	Steve Furniss	United States	2:08.45	
4	Gary Hall, Sr.	United States	2:08.49	
5	András Hargitay	Hungary	2:09.66	
6	Mikhail Sukharev	Soviet Union	2:11.78	
7	Juan Carlos Bello	Peru	2:11.87	
8	Hans Ljungberg	Sweden	2:13.56	

Key: WR = World record
