= Bertram (name) =

Bertram is both a Germanic given name and a surname, from berht ("bright") and hramn ("raven"). Notable people with the name include:

Given name:

- Bertram, 6th-century bishop of Bordeaux
- Bertechramnus, also known as Bertram, 6th/7th-century bishop of Le Mans
- Beorhthelm of Stafford (also Bertram), an Anglo-Saxon saint
- Bertram (Archdeacon of Armagh) (fl. 13th century), Irish Roman Catholic cleric, Archdeacon of Armagh from 1256 to at least 1261
- Master Bertram, or Bertram of Minden (c. 1340–1414/1415), German Gothic painter
- Bertram Benedict (c. 1892 – 1978), American author and editor
- Bertram Clements (1913–2000), English footballer
- Bertram Cunningham (1871–1944), British Anglican priest and academic
- Bertram Dickson (1873–1913), Pioneer Scottish airman
- Bertram Dobell (1842–1914), English bookseller and literary scholar
- Bertram Forer (1914–2000), American psychologist
- Bert Freeman (Bertram Clewley Freeman, 1885–1955), English footballer
- Bertram Goode (1886–1955), English footballer
- C. Bertram Hartman (1882–1960), American landscape painter
- Bertram Heyn (1912–1998), 6th Commander of the Sri Lanka Army
- Bert Metzger (Bertram L. Metzger, 1909–1986), American football player and inductee of the College Football Hall of Fame
- Bertram Freeman-Mitford, 1st Baron Redesdale (1837–1916), British peer, diplomat and writer
- Bertram Ramsay (1883–1945), British Royal Navy commander, one of the principal commanders of Dunkirk evacuation, Channel Dash, Operation Overlord and Normandy landings
- Bertram Fletcher Robinson (1870–1907), British journalist, editor, author and sportsperson
- Bertram de Shotts (1467–1505), Highwayman and Giant
- Bertram Stevens (politician) (1889–1973), Premier of the Australian state of New South Wales between 1932 and 1939
- Bertram Türpe (1952–2014), German Olympic swimmer
- Bertram Wallis (1874–1952), English actor and singer

Surname:

- Adolf Bertram (1859–1945), Archbishop of Breslau and a cardinal of the Roman Catholic Church
- Alexander Bertram (German politician) (born 1988), German politician (AfD)
- Alexander Charles Bertram (1852–1908), Canadian businessman and journalist
- Annet Bertram (born 1959), Dutch senior civil servant and politician
- Charles Bertram (1723–1765), English literary impostor and forger
- Christoph Bertram (1937), German journalist and security expert
- Douglas Somerville Bertram (1913–1988), British medical entomologist
- Elsie Bertram (1912–2003), English bookseller
- Ernest Bertram (1881–1942), English footballer
- Ernst Bertram (1884–1957), German writer
- George Bertram (disambiguation), several people
- Hans Bertram (1906–1993), German aviation pioneer
- Helen Bertram (1865–1953), American actress and singer
- Helmut Bertram (1910–1981), German politician
- Horst Bertram (1948–2023), German footballer
- John Bertram (disambiguation), several people
- Julia Bertram (born 1989), 2012/13 German Wine Queen
- Laura Bertram (born 1978), Canadian actress
- Ossie Bertram (1909–1983), Australian rules footballer
- Otto Bertram (1916–1987), German military officer
- Ron Bertram (1924–2014), Australian politician
- Sören Bertram (born 1991), German footballer
- Tom Bertram (field hockey) (born 1977), English field hockey player
- Tom Bertram (footballer) (born 1987), German footballer
- Ute Bertram (born 1961), German politician
- William Bertram (disambiguation), several people

Fictional characters:

- Bertram (Family Guy), a character on the TV series Family Guy
- Bertram (Fire Emblem), a character in Fire Emblem: Path of Radiance
- Bertram Wilberforce Wooster (Bertie Wooster), a character from the Jeeves series by P. G. Wodehouse
- Bertram, a character from Havelok the Dane
- Bertram, Count of Rousillon, a character from All's Well That Ends Well
- Bertram "Bert" Cooper, a character on Mad Men
- Bertram, a character from the Disney Channel series Jessie
- Bertram, Sir Thomas and Lady, characters in Jane Austen's novel Mansfield Park
- Bertram, Godfrey, a character from Walter Scott's novel Guy Mannering
- Bertram Baxter, a character from Sue Townsend's series Adrian Mole
- Dr. Bertram "Bertie" Chickering Jr., a character on The Knick
- Gale Bertram, from the TV series The Mentalist
- Bertram Grover Weeks, a character from The Sandlot
- Bertram Gilfoyle, a character from Silicon Valley
- Bertram, a character from Thomas and Friends
- Bertram Lupov, a character from Isaac Asimov's short story "The Last Question"

== See also ==
- A. Bertram Chandler (1912–1984), science fiction author
