= McConnachie =

McConnachie is a surname. Notable people with the surname include:

- Billy McConnachie (born 1990), Scottish rugby league player
- Brett William McConnachie (born 1985), Canadian hockey player
- Brian McConnachie (1942–2024), American actor and writer
- William McConnachie (1848–1932), Scottish businessman and politician

== See also ==
- McConnochie
