= Partyka =

Partyka is a gender-neutral Slavic surname that may refer to

- Artur Partyka (born 1969), Polish high jumper
- Elina Partõka (born 1983), Estonian Olympic swimmer
- Natalia Partyka (born 1989), Polish table tennis player
- Valentyn Partyka (1952–2009), Soviet Olympics swimmer, father of Elina
