= Swimming at the 1968 Summer Olympics – Men's 200 metre butterfly =

Men's 200 metre butterfly at the Games of the XIX Olympiad
- Venue: Alberca Olímpica Francisco Márquez
- Dates: 24 October 1968 (heats & final)
- Competitors: 30 from 19 nations
- Winning time: 2:08.7

Medalists
1st place, gold medalist(s)		Carl Robie	United States
2nd place, silver medalist(s)		Martyn Woodroffe	Great Britain
3rd place, bronze medalist(s)		John Ferris	United States

The men's 200 metre butterfly event at the 1968 Olympic Games took place 24 October. This swimming event used the butterfly stroke. Because an Olympic-size swimming pool is 50 metres long, this race consisted of four lengths of the pool.

== Results ==
=== Heats ===
Heat 1

Rank	Athlete	Country	Time	Note
1	Martyn Woodroffe	Great Britain	2:11.6	
2	Yasuo Takada	Japan	2:13.3	
3	Avraham Melamed	Israel	2:15.4	
4	Ron Jacks	Canada	2:18.1	
5	Raúl Villagómez	Mexico	2:22.4	
6	Arturo Carranza	El Salvador	2:47.3	

Heat 2

Rank	Athlete	Country	Time	Note
1	Peter Feil	Sweden	2:11.9	
2	Gabriel Altamirano	Mexico	2:12.1	
3	Tom Arusoo	Canada	2:12.7	
4	Sergey Konov	Soviet Union	2:13.1	
5	Eduardo Orejuela	Ecuador	2:23.4	

Heat 3

Rank	Athlete	Country	Time	Note
1	John Ferris	United States	2:10.6	
2	Folkert Meeuw	West Germany	2:11.1	
3	John Thurley	Great Britain	2:12.5	
4	Giampiero Fossati	Italy	2:18.2	
5	Jacek Krawczyk	Poland	2:22.1	

Heat 4

Rank	Athlete	Country	Time	Note
1	Mark Spitz	United States	2:10.6	
2	Satoshi Maruya	Japan	2:14.2	
3	Lutz Stoklasa	West Germany	2:16.4	
4	Tomas Becerra	Colombia	2:16.8	
5	Robert Cusack	Australia	2:19.4	
6	Angelo Tozzi	Italy	2:20.9	
7	José Ferraioli	Puerto Rico	2:23.4	

Heat 5

Rank	Athlete	Country	Time	Note
1	Viktor Sharygin	Soviet Union	2:10.9	
2	Carl Robie	United States	2:11.1	
3	Valentin Kuzmin	Soviet Union	2:11.5	
4	Dick Langerhorst	Netherlands	2:17.4	
5	Graham Dunn	Australia	2:17.5	
6	Ramiro Benavides	Guatemala	2:24.3	
7	Leroy Goff	Philippines	2:25.3	

=== Final ===
Rank	Athlete	Country	Time	Notes
1	Carl Robie	United States	2:08.7	
2	Martyn Woodroffe	Great Britain	2:09.0	
3	John Ferris	United States	2:09.3	
4	Valentin Kuzmin	Soviet Union	2:10.6	
5	Peter Feil	Sweden	2:10.9	
6	Folkert Meeuw	West Germany	2:11.5	
7	Viktor Sharygin	Soviet Union	2:11.9	
8	Mark Spitz	United States	2:13.5	
