= Ton van Klooster =

Dutch swimmer (born 1954)

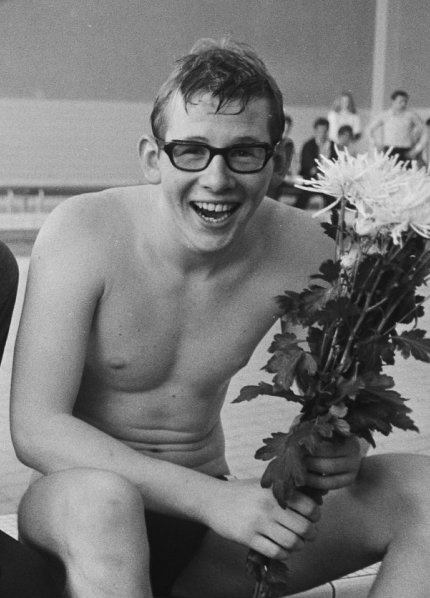
- Ton van Klooster in 1972

Personal information
- Born: 17 February 1954 (age 72) Hilversum, the Netherlands
- Height: 1.78 m (5 ft 10 in)
- Weight: 69 kg (152 lb)

Sport
- Sport: Swimming
- Club: ZV Naarden
Medal record
Representing Netherlands
Summer Universiade
| Silver medal – second place | 1973 Moscow | 1500 m freestyle |

Anton ("Ton") Willem van Klooster (born 17 February 1954) is a former freestyle swimmer from the Netherlands. He competed at the 1972 Summer Olympics and was eliminated in the heats of the 400 m and 1500 m freestyle events. Twenty years later he was the head coach of the Dutch Olympic Swim Team at the 1992 Summer Olympics in Barcelona, Spain.
