= Dunayev =

Dunayev (masculine, Russian: Дунаев) or Dunayeva (feminine, Russian: Дунаева) is a Russian surname. Notable people with the surname include:

- Andrey Dunayev (1949–2015), Russian swimmer
- Arman Dunayev (born 1966), Khazakh politician
