= Alexander Bertram =

Alexander Bertram may refer to:

- Alexander Bertram (German politician) (born 1988)
- Alexander Charles Bertram (1852–1908), Canadian newspaperman and mayor of North Sydney
