= Mark Chatfield =

American swimmer (1953–1998)

Personal information
- Full name: Mark Webster Chatfield
- National team: United States
- Born: August 11, 1953 Bakersfield, California, U.S.
- Died: December 23, 1998 (aged 45)
- Height: 6 ft 0 in (1.83 m)
- Weight: 161 lb (73 kg)

Sport
- Sport: Swimming
- Strokes: Breaststroke
- Club: Pasadena Swimming Association
- College team: University of Southern California
Medal record
Men's swimming
Representing the United States
Pan American Games
Gold medal – first place	1971 Cali	100 m breaststroke
Summer Universiade
Gold medal – first place	1973 Moscow	4×100 m medley
Bronze medal – third place	1973 Moscow	100 m breaststroke

Mark Webster Chatfield (August 11, 1953 – December 23, 1998) was an American breaststroke swimmer and breaststroke specialist.

Chatfield won the gold medal in the 100-meter breaststroke at the 1971 Pan American Games. He represented the United States as a 19-year-old at the 1972 Summer Olympics in Munich, Germany. He advanced to the event final of the men's 100-meter breaststroke, finishing fourth with a time of 1:06.1.

He was the 1973 U.S. national champion in the 100-yard breaststroke (57.36). He attended the University of Southern California (USC), where he swam for the USC Trojans swimming and diving team from 1972 to 1975. As a college swimmer, he was recognized as an All-American in 1972 (100-yard breaststroke, 200-yard breaststroke), 1973 (100-yard breaststroke, 200-yard breaststroke, 400-yard medley relay), 1974 (100-yard breaststroke, 200-yard breaststroke, 400-yard medley relay), and 1975 (100-yard breaststroke, 200-yard breaststroke, 200-yard individual medley, 400-yard medley relay).

An accomplished Baroque and period musician, vocalist and composer, he played cello and was a countertenor.

Chatfield came out of retirement in 1994 to participate in the Gay Games. He recounted how "he could never disclose his sexuality for fear of losing his spot on the team."

Chatfield died of lymphoma on December 23, 1998; he was 45 years old.

== See also ==
- List of University of Southern California people
