= Greg Buckingham =

American swimmer (1945–1990)

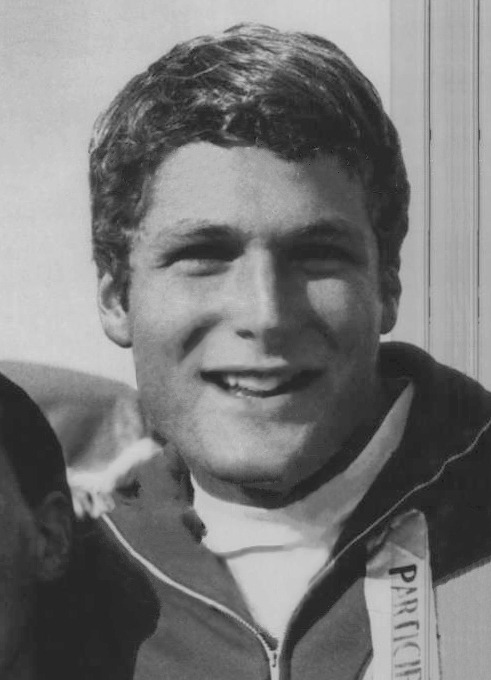
- Buckingham in 1968

Personal information
- Full name: Gregory Fenton Buckingham
- Nickname: "Greg"
- National team: United States
- Born: July 29, 1945 Riverside, California, U.S.
- Died: November 11, 1990 (aged 45) San Carlos, California, U.S.
- Height: 6 ft 3 in (1.91 m)
- Weight: 185 lb (84 kg)

Sport
- Sport: Swimming
- Strokes: Individual medley
- Club: Santa Clara Swim Club
- College team: College of San Mateo; Stanford University
- Coach: George Haines (Santa Clara); Jim Gaughran (Stanford)
Medal record
Representing the United States
Olympic Games
Silver medal – second place	1968 Mexico City	200 m medley

Gregory Fenton Buckingham (July 29, 1945 – November 11, 1990) was an American competition swimmer, Olympic silver medalist, and former world record-holder in two events.

Buckingham was born in Riverside, California, to Morris H. and Rutheda Buckingham in July, 1945. His family moved to Palo Alto the following year, and then to Atherton, California in 1951. In his early years, he swam with Addison Janes Swimming School in Menlo Park, not far from his high school, and attended Encinal Grammar School. In the seventh and eighth grade, Greg was mentored in swimming by former Michigan All-American and 13-year Stanford Coach Tom Haynie at the Stanford Hills Club.

Greg was one of two older brothers of Fleetwood Mac guitarist Lindsey Buckingham. Their father Morris H. Buckingham, who was a football star at San Jose State College, by 1963 served as President of Alexander-Ballert Company of San Francisco, a producer of roasted coffee beans, and ran a coffee plant near Palo Alto. California's popular Alta Organic Coffee remains one of their brands.

== High school swimming ==
Buckingham attended Menlo-Atherton High School in Atherton, California, where he swam for coach Bob Gaughran, a swim team captain and outstanding swimmer at College of the Pacific. Greg would later swim for Bob Gaughran's brother James Gaughran at Stanford. James Gaughran was a former Stanford All American swim athlete who coached swimming at Stanford University from 1960 to 1980.

Greg became Menlo-Atherton High School's swim team captain and Most Valuable Performer. Greg's younger brother Lindsey, the future musician for Fleetwood Mac, was an accomplished swimmer in grammar school, and his older brother Jeff had excelled on both the swimming and basketball teams at Menlo-Atherton. Greg also played water polo for Menlo-Atherton, where he helped lead the team to the Northern California Prep Championship in the Fall of 1961.

=== High school swimming achievements ===
In March 1961, as a sophomore at Menlo-Atherton, Buckingham was named the school's first All-American swimmer. In April 1962, he helped set a new National High School swimming record for the 200-yard freestyle relay of 1:30, and in May of that year set league records in the 100 back and 200 individual medley. In June of '62, he was named Sequoia District Athlete of the year by the Redwood City Tribune. By the end of his high school junior year, including relays, Buckingham held five interscholastic national swimming records and had helped lead his high school varsity swim team to two South Peninsula Athletic League Championships.

== Club and college swimming ==
Graduating high school in 1963, Buckingham briefly attended San Jose State for about a year. Heralding a turning point in his swimming career, in mid-December 1964 he began swimming with the Santa Clara Swim Club in Santa Clara, California, under Hall of Fame swim coach George Haines. By April 1965, while training with Santa Clara, at the age of 19, Buckingham competed in the 400-yard individual medley at the AAU National championships at Yale, and set an American record. Under the guidance of San Mateo Athletic Hall of Fame Coach Rich Donner, he then swam for the College of San Mateo, where he continued to set several national records. Greg was later inducted into the San Mateo Athletic Hall of Fame in 2012.

Transferring to Stanford University where he swam under International Swimming Hall of Fame Coach Jim Gaughran, in 1966–67 Buckingham set world and American records in both the 200 and 400-meter individual medley. Gaughran was a friend and admirer of the coaching technique of George Haines, Buckingham's coach at Santa Clara, who had formerly coached several of Gaughran's Stanford swimmers. In the 1966–67 year, Buckingham helped lead Stanford to a first-place NCAA championship title in 1967, and a 10–0–1 record. Gaining endurance from long hours of training, he twice broke the world record in the 400-meter Individual Medley at the Santa Clara Invitational in 1967.

=== '68 Olympic medal ===
At the 1968 Summer Olympics in Mexico City, he won a silver medal in the 200-meter individual medley, finishing second with a time of 2:13.0. His second-place performance completed an American sweep of the event with Charlie Hickcox winning the gold medal (2:12.0) and John Ferris taking the bronze (2:13.3). He also competed in the 400-meter individual medley and was judged to have finished fourth in the event final, even though his clock time was the same as the bronze medalist (4:51.4).

== Death ==
Buckingham died of a heart attack in 1990 at the age of 45 in San Carlos, California. Because of his versatility with all four strokes, his coach at Santa Clara Swim Club, George Haines, considered him one of the greatest all-round swimmers of his era. Buckingham was survived by his wife Daryl, and a son and daughter.

== See also ==
- List of Olympic medalists in swimming (men)
- List of Stanford University people
- World record progression 200 metres individual medley
- World record progression 400 metres individual medley

Records
Preceded by Dick Roth	Men's 200-meter individual medley world record-holder (long course); July 24, 1966 – August 31, 1968	Succeeded by Charlie Hickcox
Preceded by Andrey Dunayev	Men's 400-meter individual medley world record-holder (long course); July 6, 1968 – July 20, 1968	Succeeded by Gary Hall, Sr.
