= David Johnson (swimmer) =

American swimmer (born 1947)

- Around 17, as Freshman swimmer at Yale

Personal information
- Full name: David Charles Johnson
- Nickname: "Dave"
- National team: United States
- Born: February 20, 1947 (age 79) Wilmington, Delaware, U.S.
- Height: 6 ft 1 in (185 cm)
- Weight: 165 lb (75 kg)

Sport
- Sport: Swimming
- Strokes: Freestyle, Medley
- Club: Wilmington Athletic Club; Philadelphia Aquatic Club
- College team: Yale University; Class of 1969
- Coach: Bob Mattson; Phil Moriarty
Medal record
Men's swimming
Representing the United States
Summer Universiade
Gold medal – first place	1973 Moscow	100 m backstroke
Gold medal – first place	1973 Moscow	200 m backstroke
Gold medal – first place	1973 Moscow	4x100 m medley

David "Dave" Charles Johnson (born February 20, 1947) is an American former competition swimmer and 1968 Mexico City Olympic competitor. He later graduated Yale Medical School and became an orthopaedic surgeon, specializing in sports medicine.

== High School swimming with Wilmington Athletic Club ==
Johnson was born on February 20, 1947 in Wilmington, Delaware, the son of Madeline and Dr. Edgar N. Johnson, an ear, nose, and throat specialist. After quitting first cross country his Freshman year and then high jump and javelin his Sophomore year at the Wilmington area's Archmere Academy, he took up swimming with ASCA Hall of Fame Coach Bob Mattson at the Wilmington Athletic Club around 1962. His younger brother Edgar N. Johnson, a future University of Delaware swim team captain and athletic director, would also swim for Mattson. David would continue to swim for the Wilmington Athletic Club with Mattson as coach throughout his time with Archmere, graduating in 1965, as Archmere Prep, though strong academically had no swim team.

Johnson knew little of the breaststroke or backstroke when he started swimming with the Wilmington Athletic Club and credited Mattson with his rapid success, particularly in the demanding individual medley event. Mattson had competed and excelled in both breaststroke and the individual medley as a Collegiate swimmer at North Carolina State and used his experience to mentor Johnson. To make an Olympic team with only five years of serious training was a rarity and a tribute to the swim program provided by Johnson's coaches Bob Mattson and later Yale's Phil Moriarty.

=== State championship times ===
At 16, winning 200 IM at '63 State Meet

In December 1963, Johnson won the 200 Individual Medley event in a three-way tie in a meet record time of 2:09.8 at the Delaware State Indoor Swimming and Diving Championships at the Central YMCA in Wilmington, and also won the 100-yard backstroke in a meet record time of 1:00.5.

With only two years of swimming competition behind him, on January 10, 1964, Johnson set a new Middle Atlantic American Athletic Union district and resident record of 2:07.2, easily winning the 200 Individual Medley at an Open Invitational Meet at the Suburban High pool in Wilmington. He also took the 100 backstroke with a time of 59.1.

At the December 1964 Delaware State Championships at the YMCA pool in Wilmington, Johnson won both the 200-yard freestyle in a meet record time of 1:57.7, and the 200-yard Individual Medley in 2:14.0. At the July 27, 1964 AAU Delaware State Outdoor Swimming Championships, Johnson won the 200-yard backstroke with a 2:17, and the Open Mile in 19:27. Johnson was training an average of around four hours a day at the time.

In the July 1965 AAU State Swimming and Diving Championships, he won both the 200-yard Butterfly in a meet record time of 2:05.5, and the 200-yard Individual Medley with a record time of 2:09.6. His state tournament wins led him to All America honors. In his Senior year at Archmede Academy, where he was an Honor Roll student, Matson said of Johnson, he was "the best I've ever coached" and "He's the first boy I've ever coached who absorbed the full mechanics of swimming".

=== National championships ===
At the April, 1964 National Championships in Bartlesville, Oklahoma, Johnson placed seventh in the 200-yard Individual Medley. In the 1965 National Championships, Johnson was a finalist in two events, finishing with a sixth and seventh.

== 1968 Mexico Olympics ==
Johnson represented the United States at the 1968 Summer Olympics in Mexico City. He broke his arm in June 1968, two months before the Olympics, though he attempted to continue to train with the cast in a plastic bag, and still made the team at the Olympic trials as an alternate. Johnson had attended the Olympic trials on August 29, 1964 at Astoria Pool in Queens New York, and attempted to qualify in the 400-meter Individual Medley as well.

He swam for the gold medal-winning U.S. relay teams in the preliminary heats of the men's 4×100-meter freestyle and men's 4×200-meter freestyle. He swam his portion of the 4x200 in a time of around 2:02. The team's time in the preliminary round of the 4x100-meter relay was 3:35.4, and in the 4x200-meter freestyle relay was 8:05.1. He did not receive a medal in either event because only relay swimmers who competed in the event final were eligible for medals under the 1968 Olympic rules. He had qualified for the 200 meter heats, but due to serious digestive issues from an apple he'd eaten in Mexico City that rendered him quite ill, he had to scratch.

== Swimming for Yale ==
Johnson attended Yale University, where he swam for Hall of Fame Coach Phil Moriarty's Yale Bulldogs swimming and diving team in National Collegiate Athletic Association (NCAA) and Ivy League competition from 1965 to 1969. As a Freshman at Yale, he set a new Yale Freshman mark for the 200 Medley, which bettered the Varsity record. As a Sophomore at Yale, at the Eastern Seaboard Intercollegiate Swimming Championships in early March 1967, he set a meet record in the 400-yard Individual Medley of 4:19.1, and also won the 200-yard Individual Medley in 1:59.9.

In his Junior year, he was a member of the Yale Varsity team that won the NCAA national championship in the 800-yard freestyle relay in 1968.

In his signature event, he won the 400-yard Individual Medley at the 1968 NCAA National Championship with a time of 4:13.9. Johnson was an NCAA All America swimmer for three years at Yale, and set records in the 200 and 440-yard individual medley.

In his last college era meet, he competed in the 1969 AAU Championships in Long Beach, California, where he won the gold in the 200 Individual Medley, the silver in the 400 individual medley, and swam on a few relay teams.

He graduated from Yale College in 1969, and the Yale School of Medicine in 1973.

== Moscow Summer Universiade ==
Continuing to train in 1973 while in Medical School, he won gold medals in the 100 and 200-meter backstroke and the 4x100 medley relay at the Summer Universiade in Moscow.

=== Honors ===
Johnson was inducted into the Delaware Sports Hall of Fame in 1991, and the Archmere Academy Sports Hall of Fame in 1993.

=== Life after swimming ===
After graduating Yale Medical School, he became an orthopaedic surgeon, specializing in sports medicine. Johnson was a team doctor for the US Olympic team at the 1980 Winter Olympics. He completed both his internship and residency at George Washington University, after which he practiced in Washington, DC, mainly out of the MedStar Washington Hospital. He married the former Patricia Ann Depuy and lived in Falls Church, Virginia in 1980, swimming twice a week at the George Washington University pool.

He has worked as an Assistant Professor in orthopaedic surgery at George Washington University, and served as a medical consultant for the President's Council on Physical Fitness and Sports. He lived in Chevy Chase, Maryland in 1993.

== See also ==
- List of Yale University people
