= George Bertram =

George Bertram may refer to:

- George Hope Bertram (1847–1900), Scottish-Canadian businessman and politician
- George Bertram (footballer, born 1896), (1896–1963), English footballer for Fulham, Brentford
- George Bertram (footballer, born 1908), (1908–1972), Scottish footballer for Airdrieonians

== See also ==
- Bertram (name)
