= Birutė Užkuraitytė =

Lithuanian swimmer (born 1953)

Personal information
- Born: 22 February 1953 (age 73) Kaunas, Lithuanian SSR, Soviet Union
- Height: 1.72 m (5 ft 8 in)
- Weight: 62 kg (137 lb)

Sport
- Sport: Swimming
Medal record
Women's swimming
Representing the Soviet Union
Summer Universiade
Bronze medal – third place	1973 Moscow	200 m medley

Birutė Užkuraitytė (Russian: Бируте Ужкурайтите; born 22 February 1953) is a Lithuanian swimmer. She competed for the Soviet Union at the 1972 Summer Olympics in the 200 m and 400 m individual medley events, but did not reach the finals.

She won two Soviet titles in 1972–73, and a bronze medal at the 1973 Summer Universiade in the 200 m medley. Since 1988 she competes in the masters category, under her married name Statkevičienė.
