= Tim McKee =

American swimmer (born 1953)

Personal information
- Full name: Alexander Timothy McKee
- National team: United States
- Born: March 14, 1953 (age 73) Ardmore, Pennsylvania, US
- Height: 5 ft 8 in (1.73 m)
- Weight: 154 lb (70 kg)

Sport
- Sport: Swimming
- Strokes: Backstroke, individual medley
- Club: Suburban Swim Club
- College team: University of Florida
- Coach: Bill Harlan
Medal record
Men's swimming
Representing the United States
Olympic Games
Silver medal – second place	1972 Munich	200 m medley
Silver medal – second place	1972 Munich	400 m medley
Silver medal – second place	1976 Montreal	400 m medley
Pan American Games
Silver medal – second place	1971 Cali	200 m backstroke

Alexander Timothy McKee (born March 14, 1953) is an American former competition swimmer and three-time Olympic silver medalist. He was a successful medley and backstroke swimmer, and is often remembered for being a part of the closest Olympic swimming finish in history and the resulting rule changes regarding the timing of international swimming events.

== Early years ==
McKee was born in Ardmore, Pennsylvania. He was the fourth of nine children in his family; his father Alexander "Big Al" McKee was a former All-American for Ohio State University's Buckeye swimming and diving team in the late 1930s. While McKee was a child, his parents moved the family to Newtown Square, Pennsylvania, so that he and his siblings could walk through a path in their backyard to the Suburban Swim Club to practice, where his father served as coach from 1962 to 1968. Three of his brothers and two of sisters achieved some measure of national or international recognition as competition swimmers. McKee graduated from Malvern Preparatory School in Malvern, Pennsylvania in 1971. Shortly before Tim McKee graduated, Greg Jagenburg, a World Aquatics and Pan American Games Champion in butterfly also swam for Malvern and the Suburban Swim Club along with McKee's brother Chris, a High School All American.

== College swimming career ==
After high school, McKee accepted an athletic scholarship to attend the University of Florida in Gainesville, Florida, where he swam for coach Bill Harlan's Florida Gators swimming and diving team in National Collegiate Athletic Association (NCAA) and Southeastern Conference (SEC) competition from 1972 to 1974. He followed his older brother Mark to Gainesville, where Mark McKee was an All-American swimmer for the Florida Gators from 1969 to 1971. As a freshman in 1972, he finished fourth in the 200-yard backstroke, and fifth in the 400-yard individual medley, as the Florida Gators finished seventh overall at the NCAA men's swimming championships. In his three years as a Gator swimmer, McKee was recognized as the SEC Swimmer of the Year in 1972, won six SEC individual titles, and received four All-American honors.

== International swimming career ==
After graduating from high school, McKee was chosen as a member of the U.S. national swim team for the 1971 Pan American Games in Cali, Colombia. He finished second in the men's 200-meter backstroke with a time of 2:07.9, earning his first silver medal in international competition.

Following his freshman college season, McKee qualified for the 1972 U.S. Olympic team despite recovering from a bout of mononucleosis. At the 1972 Summer Olympics in Munich, Germany, he represented the United States in three different events. Most memorably, McKee won a silver medal in the men's 400-meter individual medley in the closest swimming decision in Olympic history, losing by a margin of two one-thousandths (0.002) of a second to Sweden's Gunnar Larsson. Initially, the scoreboard showed that Larsson and McKee had tied with an official time of 4:31.98, but in a controversial decision, the event judges named Larsson the eventual gold medal-winner ten minutes after the race was over—Larsson's electronic clock time was 4:31.981, McKee's 4:31.983. The time difference was variously calculated as one-tenth of the time of a typical blink of a human eye, and the distance as the thickness of a coat of paint, a sheet of paper, or the minor imperfections in the individual lanes of the Olympic pool. As a result of the controversy, the international swimming federation, FINA, subsequently clarified the timing rules for competition swimming; international races are now required to be timed to the hundredth of a second, and timing to the thousandth of a second is prohibited for tie-breakers. It was the first and only Olympic swimming event ever decided on the basis of thousandths of a second. Afterward, McKee attributed his second-place finish to a tactical mistake: he looked over his shoulder to see where Larsson was in the final leg of the race.

At the 1972 Olympics, McKee garnered a second silver medal in the men's 200-meter individual medley (2:08.37), again finishing behind gold medalist Larsson, who set a new world record in the event (2:07.17). He also placed fifth in the final of the men's 200-meter backstroke (2:07.29).

After his junior year at the University of Florida, McKee left the Gators swim team to train full-time for the 1976 Olympics. The 23-year-old McKee again qualified for the U.S. team in the 400-meter individual medley at the 1976 U.S. Olympic Trials. At the 1976 Summer Olympics in Montreal, he repeated his second-place performance in the men's 400-meter individual medley event, finishing behind gold medalist and fellow American Rod Strachan. The times of both Strachan (4:23.68) and McKee (4:24.62) broke the prior world record in the event final, with Strachan setting the new mark.

During the course of his career, McKee set six American records (short course 200- and 400-yard individual medley, 400-yard medley relay; long course 100- and 220-yard backstroke, 200-yard individual medley).

== Life after competition swimming ==
McKee was inducted into the University of Florida Athletic Hall of Fame as a "Gator Great" in 1987, and the International Swimming Hall of Fame as an "Honor Swimmer" in 1998. He is a veteran celebrity swimmer for Swim Across America (SAA), a charitable organization that raises funds for cancer research, and has participated in sixteen SAA events. He has worked in Miami Beach, Florida as a life guard and public safety officer for over 20 years, has also worked in real estate, and has helped train other Olympic swimmers including Nancy Hogshead. McKee married his wife Courtney, a former competition swimmer, in 1998.

== See also ==
- List of Olympic medalists in swimming (men)
- List of University of Florida alumni
- List of University of Florida Athletic Hall of Fame members
- List of University of Florida Olympians

== Bibliography ==
- De George, Matthew, Duels in the Pool: Swimming's Greatest Rivalries, Scarecrow Press, Inc., Lanham, Maryland, pp. 151–158 (2013). ISBN 978-0810891753.
- Lohn, John P., The Most Memorable Moments in Olympic Swimming, Rowman & Littlefield, Lanham, Maryland, pp. 31–34 (2014). ISBN 978-1442236998.
