= McConnochie =

McConnochie is a surname. Notable people with the surname include:

- John McConnochie (born 1954), New Zealand swimmer
- Mardi McConnochie (born 1971), Australian writer and playwright
- Rhys McConnochie (born 1936), New Zealand-Australian actor
- Ruaridh McConnochie (born 1991), English rugby union player
