= Steve Furniss =

American swimmer (born 1952)

Steven Furniss
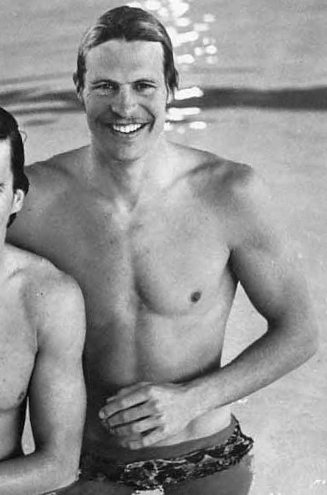
- Furniss in 1976

Personal information
- Full name: Steven Charles Furniss
- Nickname: "Steve"
- National team: United States
- Born: December 21, 1952 (age 73) Madison, Wisconsin, U.S.
- Height: 6 ft 4 in (193 cm)
- Weight: 176 lb (80 kg)

Sport
- Sport: Swimming
- Strokes: Individual medley
- Club: Philips 66 Long Beach Swim Club
- College team: University of Southern California
- Coach: Don Gambril; Philips 66; Peter Daland; USC
Medal record
Representing the United States
Olympic Games
Bronze medal – third place	1972 Munich	200 m medley
World Championships (LC)
Silver medal – second place	1975 Cali	200 m medley
Pan American Games
Gold medal – first place	1971 Cali	200 m medley
Gold medal – first place	1971 Cali	400 m medley
Gold medal – first place	1975 Mexico City	200 m medley
Gold medal – first place	1975 Mexico City	400 m medley
Universiade
Silver medal – second place	1973 Moscow	200 m backstroke
Silver medal – second place	1973 Moscow	400 m medley
Silver medal – second place	1973 Moscow	4×200 m freestyle

Steven Charles Furniss (born December 21, 1952) is an American former swimmer, business owner, Olympic bronze medalist and world record-holder.

Steve was born to Mr. and Mrs. William Furniss Senior in December 1952, in Madison, Wisconsin. After a move, he attended Foothill High School in Santa Ana, California and lived on Sanderstead Road. At Foothill High he broke conference records on the Varsity Swim Squad by his Junior year, and excelled on the water polo and golf teams, graduating in June 1971.

Around 1958, Steve, around only five or six, began swimming with the Phillips 66 Long Beach Swim Team which for a period of time in the late 60's and early 70's was managed by the skilled Olympic and Hall of Fame Coach Don Gambril and skilled coach Ralph "Flip" Darr.

== High School swimming ==
In November 1968, while playing for Foothill High School's Varsity Water Polo Team, he scored six goals and led the team to the League Championships of the California Interscholastic Federation. In May 1968, he was nominated for a "Knight of the Year" Award, and received two California Interscholastic gold medals for his participation on the Golf Team.

=== Early swimming achievements ===
As a Sophomore, Steve was rated 16th in the World in the 200 Meter backstroke long course. By his Junior year in High School, Steve held school records in the 100-yard Back and Breaststroke. His High School Coach Tom DeLong was one of winningest high school coaches in the California Interscholastic Federation, amassing a record of 190-16-1, and winning 14 league championships, and 4 California Interscholastic (State) titles from 1966-1984. DeLong considered Steve one of the top five or six high school swimmers in the nation, expecting him to make the All-American team with his best events the 200-yard individual medley, and the 400-yard freestyle, where he held the record in the Southern Section of his CIF conference. Steve's brother, Bruce Furniss who also held many Foothill swimming records, was a two-time gold medalist in the '76 Olympics.

=== National AAU meets ===
At the National AAU Meet in August 1969 as a Sophomore, Steve swam the 100 and 200 meter backstroke events, and the 200 and 400 Individual Medley events. In late August 1970, Steve also competed with the Philips 66 team in the National AAU Swimming Championship in Los Angeles, where he qualified for the finals, placing sixth with a time of 4:44.94. Apparently, Steve's times would improve.

== International competition ==
=== Pan Ams, '71, '75 ===
In August 1971, Steve won gold medals in the 200 and 400-meter Individual Medley at the Pan America competition in Cali, Colombia. His 400-meter IM was done in a Games record time. In 1975, Steve again won Pan Am gold in the 200 and 400-meter individual medley in Ciudad de Mexico.

In the August 15–25, 1973 World University Games or Universiade in Moscow, Steve took silver medals in three events; the 200 meter back (2:12.2), 400 meter medley (4:39.5), and 4x200 Meter freestyle. Steve was hampered by the flu during the competition and may have secured a first place finish if in better health.

In the 1975 World Championships in Cali, Colombia, Steve won a silver medal in the 200-meter medley.

== 1972 Olympics ==
At the 1972 Summer Olympics in Munich, Germany, he won the bronze medal in the men's 200-meter individual medley with a time of 2:08.45.

In addition to his '72 bronze medal in the 200 Meter IM, Steve also was a finalist in the 400 IM in both the 1972 and 1976 Olympics. Swimming and training with the Long Beach Swim Club under Dick Jochums after graduating USC that June, Steve led through the minute of the Butterfly leg, but came in third in the June 1976 Olympic Trials in the 400-meter Individual Medley with a time of 4:29.15, around 2.5 second short of the second place finisher. In a blazing fast pace, the first and second place finishers both broke the old American record. Rod Strachan, who swam with Steve at Foothill High, and also attended USC, won the gold medal in the 400 IM in 1976 and led in the preliminaries. At the '76 Montreal Olympics, Steve said he gave a great effort but finished sixth in competition, out of medal contention in the 400-meter IM.

== World swimming records ==
Steve set Long Course world records in the 200 Meter medley of 2:06.32 on September 1, 1974. Later in his career, Bruce helped set another long course world record in the 4x200 Meter Freestyle relay in August 1975 of 7:30.54, while swimming with Rex Favero, Tim Shaw, and his brother Bruce Furniss, during the period Steve was coached by Dick Jochums of Long Beach Swim Club. As of September 2019, the record still held.

== Swimming for USC ==
Beginning in the Fall of 1971, Furniss swam competitively and studied business at University of Southern California, and considered applying to dental school, graduating in 1975. He then worked in public relations for the swimwear company Arena.

AT USC, Furniss swam for the Hall of Fame swim coach Peter Daland. In his first NCAA championship meet as only a Freshman in 1971, he placed second in the 200 and 400-yard individual medley to swimmer Gary Hall. Swimming for USC in 1974, he won the 200-yard Individual Medley with a time of 1:51.522 in Long Beach, California.

During the full span of his college career at USC from around 1971-75, Steve took four individual medley titles in NCAA competition, and set two world records as a Trojan, described earlier. His achievements earned him a place on the Pac-12 All-Century swim team. With his solid achievements as a High School Water Polo player, Steve was also twice an All-American player on USC's Water Polo Team.

By 1975, the Furniss brothers, when they were not fully engaged in collegiate swimming, swam for Hall of Fame Coach Dick Jochums at what was then known as the Long Beach Swim Team and had previously been sponsored by Philips66.

== TYR Sport ==
He co-founded TYR Sport in 1985, his own swim company, and served as its President and CEO, retiring from the company in 2019. In 1994, Inc. Magazine named him Orange County's "Entrepreneur of the Year." For his achievement in the sports of triathlon and swimming, he received the 2014 Endurance Live Industry Award.

== See also ==
- List of Olympic medalists in swimming (men)
- List of University of Southern California people
- List of World Aquatics Championships medalists in swimming (men)
- World record progression 200 metres individual medley
- World record progression 4 × 200 metres freestyle relay

Records
Preceded by David Wilkie	Men's 200-meter individual medley world record-holder September 1, 1974 – August 23, 1975 (tied Wilkie's record)	Succeeded by Bruce Furniss
