= Swimming at the 1967 Pan American Games – Men's 100 metre backstroke =

Men's 100 metre backstroke at the 1967 Pan American Games
- Venue: Pan Am Pool
- Dates: July 27 (preliminaries and finals)
- Competitors: from - nations

Medalists
Gold medal	Charlie Hickcox	United States
Silver medal	Fred Haywood	United States
Bronze medal	Jim Shaw	Canada

The men's 100 metre backstroke competition of the swimming events at the 1967 Pan American Games took place on 27 July at the Pan Am Pool. The last Pan American Games champion was Ed Bartsch of US.

This race consisted of two lengths of the pool, all in backstroke.

== Results ==
All times are in minutes and seconds.

KEY:	q	Fastest non-qualifiers	Q	Qualified	GR	Games record	NR	National record	PB	Personal best	SB	Seasonal best

=== Final ===
The final was held on July 27.

Rank	Name	Nationality	Time	Notes
1st place, gold medalist(s)	Charlie Hickcox	United States	1:01.2	GR
2nd place, silver medalist(s)	Fred Haywood	United States	1:02.5	
3rd place, bronze medalist(s)	Jim Shaw	Canada	1:02.9	
4	-	-	-	
5	-	-	-	
6	-	-	-	
7	-	-	-	
8	Valdir Mendes Ramos	Brazil	1:05.8	
