= Jürgen Schiller =

German swimmer

Personal information
- Born: 18 August 1946 (age 79) Hollstadt, Germany

Sport
- Sport: Swimming

Jürgen Schiller (born 18 August 1946) is a German former swimmer. He competed in the men's 200 metre individual medley at the 1968 Summer Olympics.
