= Gunnar Larsson (swimmer) =

Swedish swimmer (born 1951)

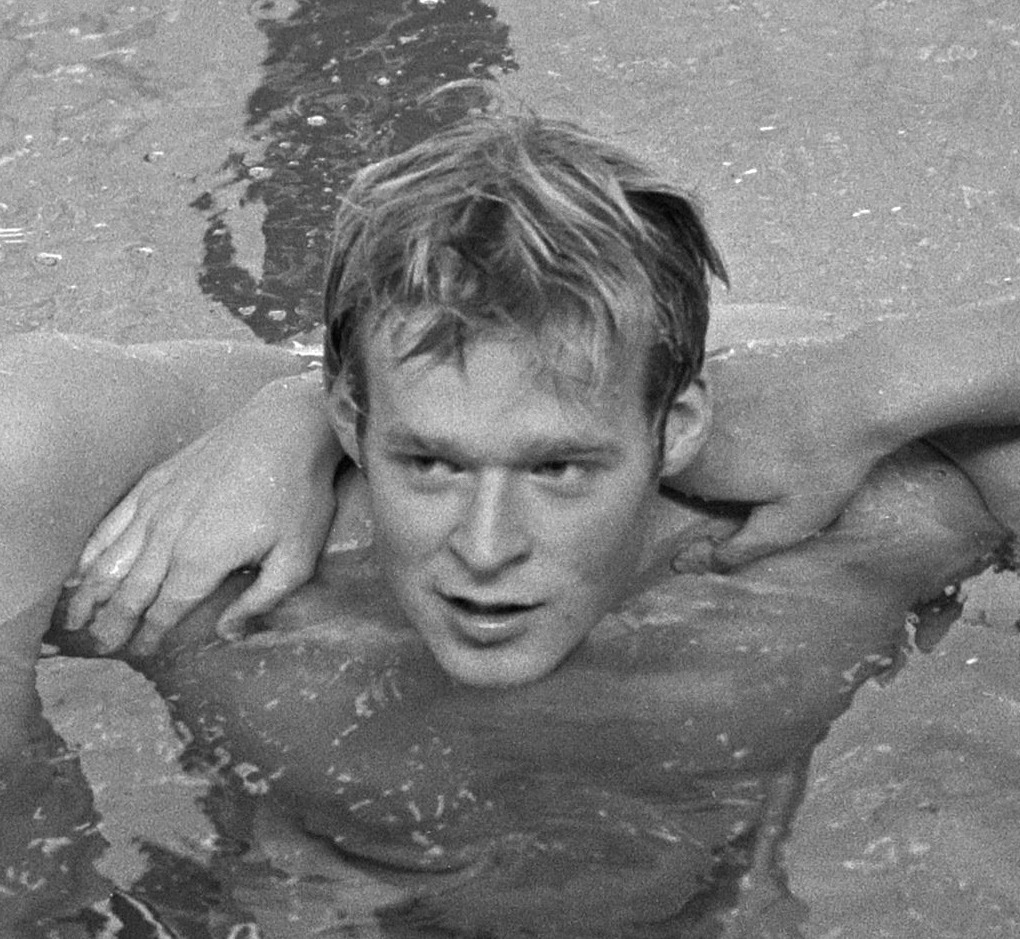
- Gunnar Larsson in April 1970

Personal information
- Full name: Carl Gunnar Larsson
- Nationality: Swedish
- Born: 12 May 1951 (age 75) Malmö, Sweden
- Height: 1.86 m (6 ft 1 in)
- Weight: 86 kg (190 lb)

Sport
- Sport: Swimming
- Strokes: Medley
- Club: SK Ran, Malmö SS
Medal record
Representing Sweden
Olympic Games
Gold medal – first place	1972 Munich	200 m medley
Gold medal – first place	1972 Munich	400 m medley
World Championships
Gold medal – first place	1973 Belgrade	200 m medley
European Championships
Gold medal – first place	1970 Barcelona	400 m freestyle
Gold medal – first place	1970 Barcelona	200 m medley
Gold medal – first place	1970 Barcelona	400 m medley
Silver medal – second place	1970 Barcelona	200 m freestyle

Karl Gunnar Larsson (born 12 May 1951) is a former swimmer from Sweden. He won the 400 metre individual medley event at the 1972 Summer Olympics by two one-thousandths (0.002) of a second over American Tim McKee, breaking the Olympic record. The controversy over the accuracy of such timing was the reason the international swimming rules were subsequently changed, and today swimming times are measured in hundredths of a second.

He also won the 200 metre individual medley event at the same Olympic Games, setting the new world record. Two years earlier, Larsson received the Svenska Dagbladet Gold Medal due to his swimming at the 1970 European championships where he won three gold (200 metre medley, 400 metre medley and 400 metre freestyle) and one silver (200 m freestyle). A year later, 1973, Larsson won the 200 metre individual medley at the first official FINA World Championships in Belgrade.

During his career, Larsson set three world and eight European records. Together with Arne Borg he is considered as Sweden's greatest swimmer of all time. In 1979, he was inducted in the International Swimming Hall of Fame.

Larsson retired from competitive swimming in 1973 and until 1980 worked as a swimming coach. Later he took miscellaneous jobs, mostly with McDonald's and the Swedish Swimming Federation (2000–2005); he also did one year of acting in 2003. Between 1974 and 2004 he worked as part-time swimming commentator with radio stations.

His mother died in 1960 when he was only nine years old. In 1979, he married Marianne Larsson. They have three children: Lotten (b. 1978), Emelie (b. 1980) and Amanda (b. 1989). His elder sisters, Karin and Kristina, are also former Olympic swimmers.

== See also ==
- List of members of the International Swimming Hall of Fame
- List of Olympic medalists in swimming (men)
- World record progression 400 metres freestyle

Records
Preceded by Gary Hall Sr.	Men's 200 metre individual medley world record holder (long course); 12 September 1970 – 24 August 1974	Succeeded by David Wilkie
Awards
Preceded by Ove Kindvall	Svenska Dagbladet Gold Medal; 1970	Succeeded by Stellan Bengtsson
