= Viktor Sharygin =

Personal information
- Born: 9 October 1949 Moscow, Russian SFSR, Soviet Union
- Died: August 1991 (aged 41) Moscow, Soviet Union
- Height: 1.80 m (5 ft 11 in)
- Weight: 78 kg (172 lb)

Sport
- Sport: Swimming
- Club: Burevestnik Moskva
Medal record
Men's swimming
Representing Soviet Union
European Championships
Bronze medal – third place	1974 Vienna	4×100 m medley
Universiade
Silver medal – second place	1970 Turin	4×100 m medley
Bronze medal – third place	1973 Moscow	200 m butterfly

Viktor Sharygin (Russian: Виктор Шарыгин; 9 October 1949 – 1991) was a Russian swimmer who won a bronze medal at the 1974 European Aquatics Championships. He also competed at the 1968 and 1972 Summer Olympics and finished fourth in the 4 × 100 m medley (1972) and seventh in the 200 m butterfly (1968). Between 1969 and 1974 he set nine national records in butterfly and medley relay events.\ Around 1990 he competed in the masters category and won a national titles in the 100 m butterfly. He died in August 1991 during the 1991 Soviet coup d'état attempt.
