= Swimming at the 1971 Pan American Games – Men's 200 metre backstroke =

Men's 200 metre backstroke at the 1971 Pan American Games
- Venue: -
- Dates: August 8 (preliminaries and finals)
- Competitors: from - nations

Medalists
Gold medal	Charles Campbell	United States
Silver medal	Tim McKee	United States
Bronze medal	John Hawes	Canada

The men's 200 metre backstroke competition of the swimming events at the 1971 Pan American Games took place on 8 August. The last Pan American Games champion was Ralph Hutton of Canada.

This race consisted of four lengths of the pool, all in backstroke.

== Results ==
All times are in minutes and seconds.

KEY:	q	Fastest non-qualifiers	Q	Qualified	GR	Games record	NR	National record	PB	Personal best	SB	Seasonal best

=== Final ===
The final was held on August 8.

Rank	Name	Nationality	Time	Notes
1st place, gold medalist(s)	Charles Campbell	United States	2:07.1	GR
2nd place, silver medalist(s)	Tim McKee	United States	2:07.9	
3rd place, bronze medalist(s)	John Hawes	Canada	2:14.7	
4	Brad Storey	Canada	2:16.8	
5	César Lourenço	Brazil	2:16.8	
6	Jose Urueta	Mexico	2:17.5	
7	Rafael Rocha	Mexico	2:18.5	
8	Carlos Santiago	Puerto Rico	2:21.1	
