= Juan Carlos Bello =

Peruvian swimmer

Personal information
- Full name: Juan Carlos Bello Angosto
- Born: 6 January 1949 (age 77) Mollendo, Peru
- Height: 184 cm (6 ft 0 in)
- Weight: 72 kg (159 lb)

Sport
- Sport: Swimming
- Strokes: freestyle, butterfly, medley
- College team: University of Michigan
- Coach: Gus Stager

Juan Carlos Bello (born 6 January 1949) is a Peruvian former butterfly, freestyle and medley swimmer. He was an outstanding competitor for the University of Michigan swim team and represented Peru at the 1968 and 1972 Summer Olympics. He later worked as a coach and served as the President of the National Swimming Foundation of Peru. He now owns the Johnny Bello Swimming Academy, which competes in national swim tournaments as “Club Surco.”

== Swimming for U. of Michigan ==
Swimming as a Sophomore for the University of Michigan on March 1, 1968, at the Big 10 Swimming Championships in Ann Arbor, Bello broke a Big 10 record in the 200-yard freestyle with a time of 1:42.8. Gus Stager, Bello's Hall of Fame coach at Michigan, had set records in the 200-freestyle while in his Freshman year swimming for Michigan and likely aided Bello in his mastery of the event.

At the 1968 Big 10 Swimming Championship, Bello also anchored the Michigan team that won the 400-yard freestyle relay in 3:09, and the night before anchored Michigan's winning 800-yard freestyle relay team.

Bello's time for his 200-yard anchor leg in the 800-yard medley relay at the Big 10 Championship was 1:42.0. At the last lap of the relay, Bello caught and passed Indiana swimmer and former Olympic champion Bob Windle. Bello also came in second in the 200-yard Individual Medley against future Olympic medalist Charlie Hickcox of Indiana. Michigan came in a close second to Indiana in the final point scoring. That year Bello had won three gold medals in the South American games.

== 1968 National AAU championships ==
A versatile swimmer, on August 2, 1968, he came in third with a time of 1:57.7, in the Men's 200-meter freestyle at the AAU National Swimming Championships in Lincoln, Nebraska, qualifying him for the Olympic trials in the event. His time was only .7 of a second behind the eighteen-year old first place finisher Mark Spitz, who would later set a world record in the event in 1972. He edged out 1964 four-time American Olympic gold medalist Don Schollander by 1.4 seconds. Schollander had a bad turn at the 100 meter wall. Bello also won another of his signature events, the 200-meter medley, in 2:14.1, just under a career best. He would significantly improve his time in the 1972 Olympics. In the trying 400-meter individual medley, Bello recorded a 4:53.3.

== 1971 Division I NCAA Championships ==
At the NCAA Division I Championship in 1971, he finished first in the 200-yard freestyle with a time of 1:42.70.

== 1968 Olympics ==
At the 1968 Olympic preliminaries in Mexico City, Belo won the seventh heat in the 200-meter freestyle with a time of 2:01.3, and qualified for the finals. Coach for the Peruvian team in the 1968 Olympics was American Ron Ballatore, who was coaching at Pasadena City College at the time.

He competed at the 1968 Summer Olympics in Mexico City in October, in the 200 meter freestyle and the 200-meter individual medley, though he did not medal in stiff international competition. In his closest swims for an Olympic medal, his 200-meter individual medley time in the finals was 2:13.7, placing him only .4 of a second behind American bronze medalist and Stanford swimmer John Ferris.

== 1972 Olympics ==
In the 1972 Summer Olympics he competed in the 100-meter butterfly and the 200-meter individual medley. In the 100-meter butterfly, he finished ninth with a time of 57.51, well out of medal contention.

At the Olympic preliminaries in Munich, Bello swam in the fourth preliminary heat for the 200-meter individual medley, qualifying with a time of 2:11.70, putting him in the top eight for qualifying times, though he could not later match this time in the event final.

His 200-meter individual medley time in the finals was 2:11.87, and though it bettered his time in the '68 Olympics in the event where he came close to a bronze medal, it only put him in seventh place in the more competitive '72 Olympic field.

By 1978, Bello had done some coaching in his native Peru, and had served as the coach for Peruvian swimmer and 1980 Olympic prospect Ernesto Dominack, who swam in the 1975 Pan Am Games. He referred Dominack to Coach Flip Darr, Director of Southern California's Saddleback Aquatics, though Dominack was coached by Darr at Darr's Irvine NOVA Swim Club.

== President, Peru National Swimming Foundation ==
Taking on roles in the swimming community, by 1997, Juan Carlos Bello was President of the National Swimming Federation of Peru. He authored a recommendation for Peruvian swimmer Luis Gayoso to swim for Pennsylvania's Shippensburg University. At the time Gayoso was being considered for the Peruvian National team.
