= Swimming at the 1973 Summer Universiade =

Swimming at the VII Summer Universiade
- Venues: Lenin Stadium Pool

The swimming competition at the 1973 Summer Universiade took place in Moscow, USSR in August 1973.

== Men's events ==
Event	Gold		Silver		Bronze	
100 m freestyle	Vladimir Bure; Soviet Union	52.03	Kenneth Knox; United States	52.90	Dean Anderson; United States	53.31
400 m freestyle	Jack Tingley; United States	4:02.87	Aleksandr Samsonov; Soviet Union	4:12.09	José Namorado; Brazil	4:12.74
1500 m freestyle	Jack Tingley; United States	16:02.20	Anton Van Klooster; Netherlands	16:30.03	Jim McConica; United States	16:37.79
100 m backstroke	David Johnson; United States	59.94	Igor Potyakin; Soviet Union	1:00.59	Erik Fish; Canada	1:00.67
200 m backstroke	David Johnson; United States	2:10.53	Steve Furniss; United States	2:12.72	John Hawes; Canada	2:13.93
100 m breaststroke	Nikolai Pankin; Soviet Union	1:06.67	Igor Tcherdakov; Soviet Union	1:07.19	Mark Chatfield; United States	1:07.74
200 m breaststroke	Nikolai Pankin; Soviet Union	2:23.81	Igor Tcherdakov; Soviet Union	2:24.06	Felipe Muñoz; Mexico	2:27.89
100 m butterfly	Allan Poucher; United States	56.36	Byron MacDonald; Canada	57.17	Pat O'Connor; United States	57.77
200 m butterfly	Allen Poucher; United States	2:05.67	Folkert Meeuw; West Germany	2:06.53	Viktor Sharygin; Soviet Union	2:09.00
400 m individual medley	Sergei Zacharov; Soviet Union	4:37.96	Steve Furniss; United States	4:39.54	Lee Engstrand; United States	4:40.13
4×100 m freestyle relay	United States (USA); Mark Elliot; Elliot Tietre; Dean Anderson; Kenneth Knox	-	Soviet Union (URS)	-	West Germany (FRG)	-
4×200 m freestyle relay	Soviet Union (URS)	7:43.28	United States (USA); Mark Elliot; Elliot Reeder; Jack Tingley; Steve Furniss	7:43.61	Brazil (BRA); José Namorado; José Aranha; James Huxley Adams; Alfredo Machado	8:02.06
4×100 m medley relay	United States (USA); David Johnson; Mark Chatfield; Allan Poucher; Kenneth Knox	3:55.15	Soviet Union (URS)	3:56.07	West Germany (FRG)	4:02.65

Legend: CR – Championship record; CWR – Commonwealth record; NR – National record

== Women's events ==
Event	Gold		Silver		Bronze	
100 m freestyle	Sally Tuttle; United States	1:00.33	Jutta Weber; West Germany	1:00.59	Heidi Reineck; West Germany	1:00.82
400 m freestyle	Ann Simmons; United States	4:28.80	Jill Strong; United States	4:39.15	Nadezhda Matyukhina; Soviet Union	4:41.56
100 m backstroke	Mary Feldman; United States	1:07.04	Elizabeth Tullis; United States	1:07.38	Benedicte Duprez; France	1:09.65
100 m breaststroke	Lyubov Rusanova; Soviet Union	1:15.54	Catherine Carr; United States	1:15.60	Galina Stepanova; Soviet Union	1:17.03
200 m breaststroke	Catherine Carr; United States	2:42.30	Lyudmila Porubayko; Soviet Union	2:42.68	Robyn Farrell; Australia	2:48.49
100 m butterfly	Irene Arden; United States	1:06.05	Cathy Corcione; United States	1:07.34	Alexandra Meerzon; Soviet Union	1:07.46
200 m individual medley	Susie Atwood; United States	2:26.38	Catherine Carr; United States	2:28.65	Birutė Užkuraitytė; Soviet Union	2:29.30
4×100 m freestyle relay	United States (USA); Cathy Corcione; Elizabeth Tullis; Eadie Wetsel; Sally Tuttle	4:01.04	Soviet Union (URS)	4:07.83	West Germany (FRG)	4:10.41
4×100 m medley relay	United States (USA); Elizabeth Tullis; Catherine Carr; Irene Arden; Sally Tuttle	4:29.78	Soviet Union (URS)	4:31.27	West Germany (FRG)	4:46.63

Legend: CR – Championship record; CWR – Commonwealth record; NR – National record

== Medal table ==
Rank	Nation	Gold	Silver	Bronze	Total
1	United States (USA)	16	9	5	30
2	Soviet Union (URS)	6	9	5	20
3	West Germany (FRG)	0	2	5	7
4	Canada (CAN)	0	1	2	3
5	Netherlands (NED)	0	1	0	1
6	Brazil (BRA)	0	0	2	2
7	Australia (AUS)	0	0	1	1
7	France (FRA)	0	0	1	1
7	Mexico (MEX)	0	0	1	1
Totals (9 entries)		22	22	22	66
