= John Ferris (swimmer) =

American swimmer (1949–2020)

John E. Ferris
- Ferris around 19, Olympic photo, 1968

Personal information
- Full name: John Edward Ferris
- National team: United States
- Born: July 24, 1949 Sacramento, California, U.S.
- Died: September 13, 2020 (aged 71) Walnut Creek, California, U.S.
- Height: 5 ft 11 in (1.80 m)
- Weight: 165 lb (75 kg)

Sport
- Sport: Swimming
- Strokes: Butterfly, individual medley
- Club: Arden Hills Swim Club
- College team: Stanford University
- Coach: James Gaughran (Stanford)
Medal record
Men's swimming
Representing the United States
Olympic Games
Bronze medal – third place	1968 Mexico City	200 m butterfly
Bronze medal – third place	1968 Mexico City	200 m medley
Universiade
Gold medal – first place	1967 Tokyo	200 m butterfly
Gold medal – first place	1970 Turin	100 m butterfly
Gold medal – first place	1970 Turin	200 m butterfly
Gold medal – first place	1970 Turin	4×100 m medley
Silver medal – second place	1967 Tokyo	400 m medley

John Edward Ferris (July 24, 1949 – September 13, 2020) was an American competition swimmer, for Stanford University, a winner of two bronze medals in the 1968 Olympics in butterfly and medley events, and a one-time world record-holder.

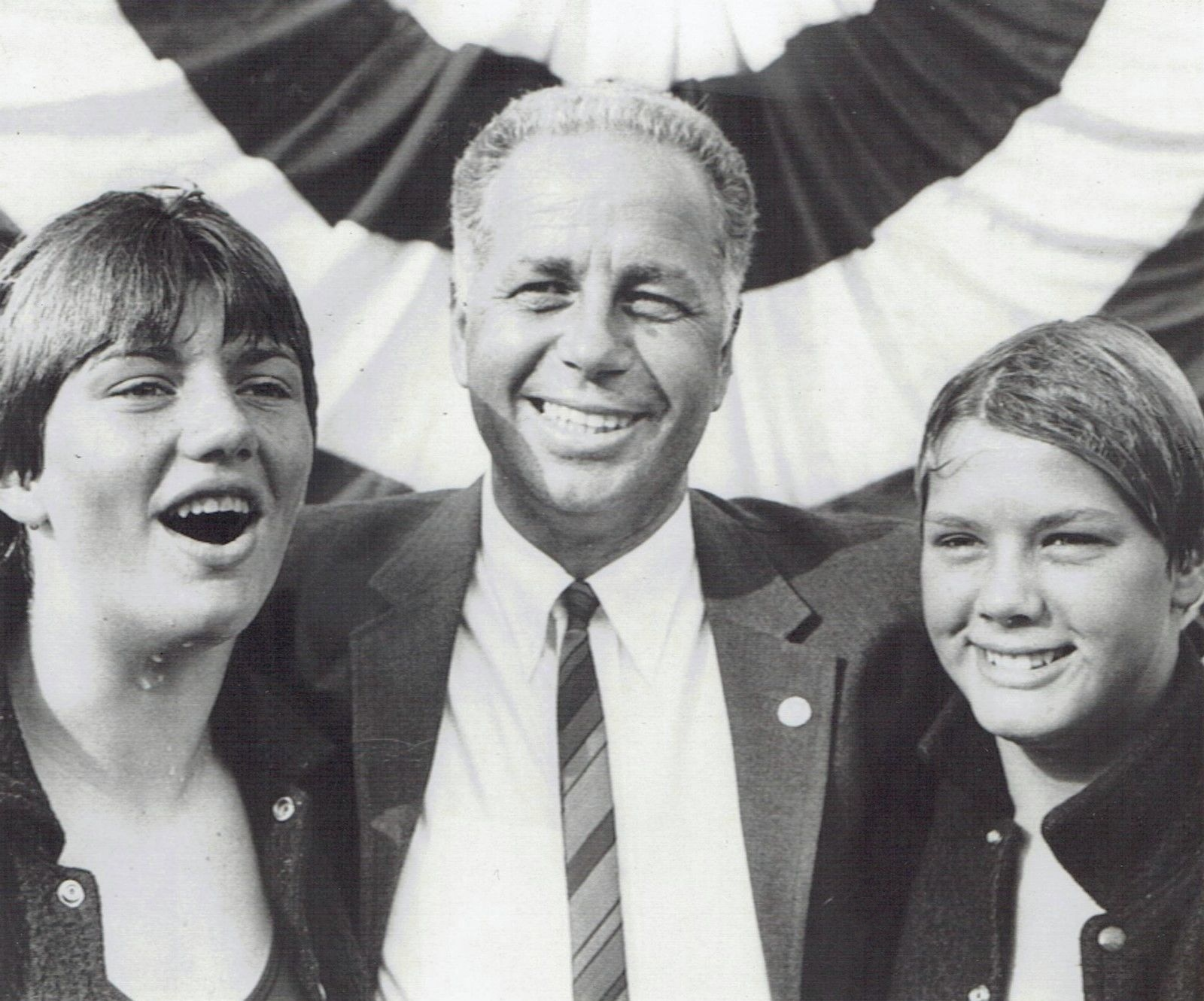
S. Chavoor (c), and Olympians S. Pedersen (l) and D. Meyer (r)

Ferris was born on July 24, 1949, in Sacramento, California, to James and Ida Ferris and attended Rio Americano High School in greater Sacramento. He did much of his early training at Arden Hills Swim Club in Sacramento under Hall of Fame Coach Sherm Chavoor who had coached many great American Olympians including Mark Spitz, Debbie Meyer, and Mark J. Burton, each of whom would also swim in the 1968 Olympics with Ferris. A standout at only around 15 while swimming for Arden Hills in June, 1964, Ferris swam a 55.2 for the 100-yard butterfly breaking an age group record in the Junior Olympics, while also placing first in the 100 freestyle with a 1:56.5.

At peak intensity, Ferris's training at Arden Hills could include three workouts a day, and average as much as 80 miles a week. His sisters Carolyn and Joan also swam for Arden Hills, and Carolyn would later set age group records with masters swimming and coach the Woodlands Masters Swim Team in Houston.

== World record 200 fly ==
At 18, in what was likely his most noteworthy performance prior to the Olympics, he received a gold medal in the 200-meter butterfly at the 1967 World University Games, where he set a new world-record time of on 2:06.0 August 30, 1967 in Tokyo. His rival Mark Spitz broke his record six weeks later on October 8, 1967.

== 1968 Mexico Olympics ==
Prior to completing his college swimming career, Ferris won two bronze medals at the 1968 Summer Olympics in Mexico City; one in the men's 200-meter individual medley and one in the men's 200-meter butterfly with a 2:09.3, remaining in third place through most of the race. America's Mark Spitz, a former Arden Hills swimmer like John, was favored to win the race, but finished eighth. Ferris's third-place finish in the 200-meter individual medley with a time of 2:13.3 completed an American sweep of the event, with Charlie Hickcox taking first and Greg Buckingham taking second. In a tight race, Ferris finished only .3 of a second behind American's second place Buckingham.

Ferris was known for the outstanding efficiency of his starts, taking a somewhat steeper dive angle off the starting block than most swimmers of his era, followed by powerful dolphin kicks. He was studied and copied in clinics both for his dive start method and for his efficient turns. Referencing his technique for swim starts off the block, Ferris's Stanford Coach James Gaughran believed that "there isn't a swimmer in the world who doesn't use John's innovation."

== Stanford ==
Following his August, 1967 world record breaking time in the 200-meter butterfly, Ferris attended Stanford University, beginning in September 1967, and graduating in 1973 with a major in creative writing. A rising power, Stanford had won the NCAA national team championship in 1967, the year before Ferris began his studies. Continuing his swimming career, Ferris trained and competed with the Stanford swimming and diving team in National Collegiate Athletic Association (NCAA) competition under Hall of Fame Coach James Gaughran. During his collegiate swimming career, Ferris earned NCAA championship titles three times, and captured 10 Pac-10 championship titles. Included in his NCAA Championship wins, was a national title in the 200-yard butterfly in 1969 where he swam a time of 1:49.61, and wins with Stanford's 400-yard medley relay squad in 1970 and 1971.

He performed with particular distinction at the 1970 World University Games in Turin, Italy where he captured another victory in the 200 butterfly and took a gold medal in the 100-meter fly as well. He won a third gold swimming with the United States' 400 medley relay team at the University Games, and in the 400 Individual Medley, captured a silver medal, demonstrating his mastery of diverse strokes, and multiple events.

Prior to the 1972 Olympics in 1971, Ferris withdrew from more serious competition, likely tiring of the intense training he had endured during summers and High School era competition with the Arden Hills swim club, particularly while training for the 1968 Olympics.

== Later life ==
He swam and trained competitively with United States Masters Swimming from 1981 to 1983, where he had several firsts recorded as top ten national age group finishes in butterfly events in 1982. Still training into later life, he continued to record what may have been age-group world records, though they remained unofficial during less frequent pool workouts into his fifties and sixties. A talented writer, he was the author of Olympix, a fictional work about a world-class swimmer from California who loses his chances to make the Olympic Games in 1980.

He became itinerant by around 1990, moving from place to place after his swimming career. He established a Tahitian tourist resort on a vacant rubber plantation, before coming back to California and finding work in a cut flower business in collaboration with a Dutch botanist. After starting a small mall in Malibu, California, he set up the Blue Guitar, a restaurant in Sun Valley, Idaho, where he served as the head chef. He ran a school to teach Chinese students English, and later researched a second novel.

Travelling frequently, Ferris lived in Albania, California, Croatia, England, Ethiopia, French Polynesia, Idaho, Ireland, Istanbul, Montréal, Moskva, Newfoundland, Paris, Portugal, and Praha. Near the end of his life he started a youth hostel in Prague, Czech Republic that succeeded as a business venture.

Ferris died from lung cancer on September 13, 2020, in Walnut Creek, California, and was survived by five of his original six siblings.

== Honors ==
Ferris was a member of the Stanford University Sports Hall of Fame.

== See also ==
- List of Olympic medalists in swimming (men)
- List of Stanford University people
- World record progression 200 metres butterfly
