= Bernhard Mock =

German swimmer

Personal information
- Nationality: German
- Born: 30 January 1945 (age 81) Königshofen, Germany

Sport
- Sport: Swimming

Bernhard Mock (born 30 January 1945) is a German former swimmer. He competed in the men's 400 metre individual medley at the 1968 Summer Olympics.
