= Doug Jamison =

Canadian swimmer

Personal information
- Born: 30 October 1952 Edmonton, Alberta, Canada
- Died: 19 December 2024 (aged 72)
- Height: 6 ft 2 in (188 cm)
- Weight: 190 lb (86 kg)

Sport
- Sport: Swimming

Doug Jamison (30 October 1952 – 19 December 2024) was a Canadian swimmer. He competed in the men's 200 metre individual medley at the 1972 Summer Olympics at age 19, with a time of 2:17.71.
