= Elina Partõka =

Estonian swimmer

Personal information
- Full name: Elina Partõka
- National team: Estonia
- Born: 2 August 1983 (age 43) Donetsk, Ukrainian SSR, Soviet Union
- Height: 1.80 m (5 ft 11 in)
- Weight: 65 kg (143 lb)

Sport
- Sport: Swimming
- Strokes: Freestyle
- Club: NRK Kohtla-Järve

Elina Partõka (born 2 August 1983) is an Estonian former swimmer, who specialized in sprint freestyle events. She is a three-time Olympian (2000, 2004, and 2008), and a daughter of Valentin Partyka, who competed in both 200 and 400 m individual medley at the 1972 Summer Olympics in Munich, Germany, representing the Soviet Union.

Partoka made her first Estonian team, as a 17-year-old swimming teen at the 2000 Summer Olympics in Sydney. There, she failed to reach the semifinals in any of her individual events, finishing twenty-ninth in the 100 m freestyle (57.71), and thirty-first in the 200 m freestyle (2:05.90).

At the 2004 Summer Olympics in Athens, Partõka competed only in the 200 m freestyle. Swimming in heat three, she edged out New Zealand's Alison Fitch to earn a fourth spot and twenty-eighth overall by four hundredths of a second (0.04) in 2:03.54.

Partõka swam for the third time in the 200 m freestyle at the 2008 Summer Olympics in Beijing. She cleared a FINA B-standard entry time of 2:01.75 in the 200 m freestyle from the Slovak Open Championships in Bratislava. She won the second heat by two hundredths of a second (0.02) behind 17-year old Bulgarian swimmer Nina Rangelova, breaking an Estonian record time of 2:00.64. Partõka repeated her luck from Athens, as she shared a twenty-eighth place tie with Brazil's Monique Ferreira in the preliminaries. She posed nude for Estonian edition of Playboy in April 2009.

== See also ==
- List of Estonian records in swimming
