= Douglas Somerville Bertram =

Douglas Somerville Bertram (21 December 1913 – 24 October 1988) was a professor of medical entomology at the London School of Hygiene and Tropical Medicine. He specialized in the study of arthropod vectors and human disease, particularly malaria.

Bertram was born in Glasgow where he went to Glasgow University where he received a degree before becoming a demonstrator in zoology working until 1938 with Professor Edward Hindle. In 1938 he became an assistant to R. M. Gordon and lectured at the Liverpool School of Tropical Medicine. He received a Ph.D. in 1940 and enlisted during World War II, serving with the Royal Army Medical Corps, and was captured by the Germans in Crete and released only at the end of the war. He worked on rat filariasis from 1946. In 1948 he became a reader at the London School of Hygiene and Tropical Medicine. He conducted research on mosquitoes, the transmission of malaria, and viruses. He was a consultant for the British Army and helped develop methods for protection. His method of determining the age of (female) mosquitoes through a count of the number of corpora lutea in the ovarioles was influential in malaria research. He also examined triatomine bugs. In 1964 he received a DSc from Glasgow.

A microsporidian parasite of chironomid larvae, Thelohania bertrami, is named after him.
