= John Bertram (disambiguation) =

John Bertram (1837–1904) was a Canadian politician.

John Bertram may also refer to:

- John Bertram (died 1450), MP for Northumberland
- John Bertram (architect) (born 1966), American architect
- John Bertram (Massachusetts businessman) (1795–1882), American sea captain, businessman and philanthropist

== See also ==
- John Bartram (1699–1777), American botanist, horticulturist and explorer
