= Bertram (Archdeacon of Armagh) =

Archdeacon of Armagh (1256-1261)

Bertram was Archdeacon of Armagh from 1256; he was still in office in 1261.
