= George Bertram (footballer, born 1908) =

Scottish footballer

Personal information
- Full name: George Thoirs Geddes Bertram
- Date of birth: 2 September 1908
- Place of birth: Govan, Scotland
- Date of death: 1972 (aged 63–64)
- Place of death: Eastwood, Scotland
- Height: 5 ft 9 in (1.75 m)
- Positions: Inside left; outside left

Youth career
- Govan Avondale

Senior career*
Years	Team	Apps	(Gls)
–	Petershill		
–	Dreghorn Juniors		
1927–1933	Airdrieonians	124	(22)
1933	Hamilton Academical	3	(0)
1933	Partick Thistle	1	(0)
1934–1935	Queen of the South	6	(1)
1935–1936	King's Park	16	(1)
Total		150	(24)

International career
1931	Scottish League XI	1	(0)
- * Club domestic league appearances and goals

George Thoirs Geddes Bertram (2 September 1908 – 1972) was a Scottish footballer who featured mainly for Airdrieonians. He signed for the Diamonds as a teenager from the junior leagues in 1927, having a difficult task of not only finding a role in the strong side of the 1920s which challenged consistently for the Scottish Football League title and won the Scottish Cup in 1924, but also specifically replacing Bob McPhail, the team's inside left who had moved on to Rangers.

He became an increasingly important member of the team (although collectively they were unable to match the standards set earlier in the period), moving to outside left after the departure of Jimmy Somerville in 1930. In the 1931–32 season, his contribution was 41 league and cup appearances (including the semi-final loss to Kilmarnock) and seven goals, plus a selection for the Scottish Football League XI, but he played only six times in the following campaign before his career was halted by a broken leg, and he was released by Airdrie before its end.

Short spells with few appearances followed at top-tier sides Hamilton Academical, Partick Thistle and Queen of the South, then a year at second-level King's Park where he featured slightly more often, but he then dropped out of senior football aged 28.
