= Brett William McConnachie =

Canadian ice hockey player

- Born: March 1, 1985 (age 41); Ajax, Ontario, Canada
- Education: University of Alabama–Huntsville (2007)
- Occupation: Hockey player

Brett William McConnachie (born March 1, 1985) is a Canadian professional hockey right winger who plays for the Hamilton Steelhawks.

== Early life ==
He was born on March 1, 1985, in Ajax, Ontario, Canada.

== Education ==
McConnachie graduated from the University of Alabama–Huntsville in 2007 with a Bachelor of Science degree in business administration.

== Hockey career ==
McConnachie's hockey career spans over two decades, in which he played for the University of Alabama-Huntsville, Tulsa Oilers, Fayetteville FireAntz, Amarillo Gorillas and Whitby Dunlops, among others. He started his career by playing junior hockey in 2000. In 2001, he was drafted in the 4th round by the Toronto St. Michael's Majors of the Ontario Hockey League (OHL), placing 76th overall.

From 2001 to 2002, he played for Ajax Axemen, and in the following year, he played for the Wexford Raiders. The Russian under-20 team was traveling throughout Canada that year. During a match with that team, he drew the coaching staff's attention from the University of Alabama-Huntsville (UAH) and went to study there on a hockey scholarship. Over the next four years at UAH, he proved to be a valuable addition to the team. UAH qualified for the NCAA tournament in McConnachie's senior year.

McConnachie received a full four-year NCAA Division I scholarship to play at the University of Alabama-Huntsville.

After graduating, he spent some time playing for various teams, in professional hockey and was a fan favourite almost everywhere he played. In 2009, Brett got his first big professional break when he joined the Fayetteville Fireantz. Averaging a point a game and sparking the Antz on a deep playoff run that ended in a loss in game 7 of the President's cup finals.

== Music ==
McConnachie took piano lessons as a child. He has recorded four albums. He is also known as Bowx.

He released several albums in college, including Triple Threat, Back 4 More, and Rhythm and Bowx.

Brett has had a lot of success that spans over two decades and has led to show appearances and tours with the likes of Lil Wayne, Young JEEZY, Busta Rhymes, Wu-Tang Clan, The Lox, J-Cole, MGK, Karl Wolf, Classified, Lil Jon & The Eastside Boyz, Ludacris, Jackie Chain, Young Dro, Mike Jones, Bun B, and Three 6 Mafia.

== Discography ==
Albums:

- Triple Threat (2002)
- Back 4 More (2003)
- Rhythm & Bowx (2005)
- Now Or Never (2007)
- The Tussin Mixtape (2009)
- Ya Gotta LP (2011)
