= Ernest Bertram =

English footballer (1881–1942)

Personal information
- Full name: Ernest Edward Alfred Bertram
- Date of birth: 30 June 1881
- Place of birth: Dissington, England
- Date of death: 3 November 1942 (aged 61)
- Place of death: Monkseaton, England
- Position: Left half

Senior career*
Years	Team	Apps	(Gls)
–	South Shields Adelaide		
1903–190?	Sunderland	1	(0)
–	South Shields Adelaide		
1907–1909	Darlington		
1909–191?	South Shields		
- * Club domestic league appearances and goals

Ernest Edward Alfred Bertram (30 June 1881 – 3 November 1942) was an English footballer who played in the Football League as a left half for Sunderland in the 1903–04 season. He also played non-League football for South Shields (renamed from South Shields Adelaide in 1910) and Darlington.

== Life and career ==
Bertram was born in 1881 at Dissington, near Stamfordham in Northumberland. He was a younger son of James Bertram, a coachman in service at Dissington Hall, and his wife, Isabella. The 1901 Census lists him as a merchant's clerk living with his widowed mother in Newcastle.

Bertram played local football for teams including South Shields Adelaide before joining Sunderland for a pre-season trial in August 1903. He impressed enough to be kept on, played regularly for the "A" team in the Northern League, and was considered promising. He made his first-team debut, which was to be his only Football League appearance, on 5 March 1904 away to Small Heath in the First Division. In a reshuffled half-back line, William Fullarton replaced Alex Barrie at centre half while Bertram stood in for Dicky Jackson at left half, and Sunderland lost 2–1. He finished the season with the A team, and his services were retained for the next two seasons, but not for the first team.

Bertram played for South Shields, and continued his career with Northern League club Darlington. He played in all four of their matches in the 1907–08 FA Cup, scored in two, and signed on for the following season in the North-Eastern League, when he remained a regular in the team and again played in all their FA Cup ties. In July 1909, he married Ada, the eldest daughter of James Lunn, Newcastle City Councillor and chairman of Newcastle United F.C., at Brunswick Wesleyan Chapel. In October, he resumed his football career with South Shields Adelaide, finished the season with a runners-up medal in the Durham Senior Cup, and vice-captained the side in 1910–11.

He was by this time employed as a commercial clerk and living with Ada in a large house in Monkseaton. The 1939 Register finds him working as an electricity supply salesman, living with Ada and two adult children at the same address, where he died three years later at the age of 61.
