= Ken Campbell (swimmer) =

Canadian swimmer (born 1949)

Personal information
- Born: 21 April 1949 (age 77) West Vancouver, British Columbia, Canada

Sport
- Sport: Swimming
Medal record
Men's swimming
Representing Canada
British Commonwealth Games
Silver medal – second place	1970 Edinburgh	200 m medley

Ken Campbell (born 21 April 1949) is a Canadian former medley swimmer. He competed in two events at the 1968 Summer Olympics. Campbell later competed at the 1970 British Commonwealth Games with the Canadian Team, where he won the silver medal for swimming in the 200m individual medley.
