= Michael Holthaus =

German swimmer (born 1950)

Personal information
- Born: July 13, 1950 (age 75) Wuppertal, West Germany

Sport
- Sport: Swimming
- Strokes: Medley
Medal record
Representing West Germany
Olympic Games
| Bronze medal – third place | 1968 Mexico City | 400 m im |

Michael Holthaus (born 13 July 1950) is a German former swimmer who competed in the 1968 Summer Olympics and in the 1972 Summer Olympics. One of the most notable achievements of his swimming career was the bronze medal he earned in the 1968 Mexico City Olympics for the 400 meter Individual Medley.

Personal Olympic Records
| 200m IM | 400m IM |
|---|---|
| 2:16.8 s | 4:54.4 s |
