= Yulyan Rusev =

Bulgarian swimmer

Personal information
- Born: 31 July 1949 Varna, Bulgaria
- Died: 28 July 1974 (aged 24)

Sport
- Sport: Swimming

Yulyan Rusev (Bulgarian: Юлиян Русев, 31 July 1949 – 28 July 1974) was a Bulgarian swimmer. He competed in two events at the 1968 Summer Olympics.
