= Lars Kraus Jensen =

Danish swimmer (born 1944)

Personal information
- Born: 7 August 1944 (age 81) Frederiksberg, Denmark
- Height: 184 cm (6 ft 0 in)
- Weight: 82 kg (181 lb)

Sport
- Sport: Swimming
- Club: P08 (Copenhagen)

Lars Kraus Jensen (born 7 August 1944) is a Danish former backstroke and medley swimmer. He competed at the 1964 Summer Olympics and the 1968 Summer Olympics.
