= Rafael Hernández Rojas =

Mexican swimmer (born 1946)

Personal information
- Born: February 28, 1946 (age 80) Mexico City, Mexico

Sport
- Sport: Swimming
- Strokes: Breaststroke, medley
Medal record
Representing Mexico
Central American and Caribbean Games
Gold medal – first place	1966 San Juan	100m breaststroke
Gold medal – first place	1966 San Juan	200m breaststroke
Gold medal – first place	1966 San Juan	200m individual medley
Gold medal – first place	1966 San Juan	4x200m freestyle relay
Gold medal – first place	1966 San Juan	4x100m medley relay

Rafael Hernández Rojas (born 28 February 1946) is a Mexican former breaststroke, freestyle and medley swimmer who competed in the 1964 Summer Olympics and 1968 Summer Olympics.
