= Wolfram Sperling =

German swimmer

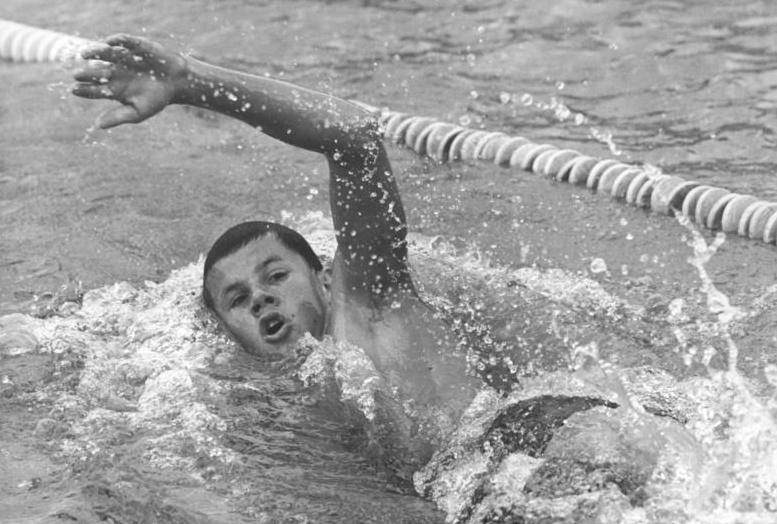
- Wolfram Sperling in 1972

Personal information
- Born: 4 December 1952 (age 73) Leipzig, East Germany
- Height: 1.85 m (6 ft 1 in)
- Weight: 68 kg (150 lb)

Sport
- Sport: Swimming
- Club: SC DHfK, Leipzig

Wolfram Sperling (born 4 December 1952) is a retired German swimmer. He competed at the 1972 Summer Olympics in the 400 m freestyle and 200 m and 400 m individual medley and finished in eighth place in the last event. He placed fourth in the 400 m and 1500 m freestyle at the 1970 European Championships.

Between 1973 and 1978 he studied sports sciences and after graduation worked at the DHfK in Leipzig, defending a PhD in 1982 and habilitation in 1990. He then taught various sports-related subjects at the University of Kiel (1993–1994) and University of Leipzig (1993–1998). In parallel he worked as a researcher in sports therapy. He is a member of the German Association of Sport Sciences, President of the Saxon Swimming Federation, and a board member of the German Swimming Federation.
