= Lee Tong-shing =

Taiwanese swimmer

Personal information
- Full name: 李 東興, Pinyin: Lǐ Dōng-xìng
- Born: 6 December 1947 (age 78) Taipei, Taiwan

Sport
- Sport: Swimming

Lee Tong-shing (born 6 December 1947) is a Taiwanese former swimmer. He competed in four events at the 1968 Summer Olympics, placing 6th, 7th, and 8th consecutively in the 100m butterfly, 100m freestyle, and the 400m individual medley. He was disqualified from the 200m individual medley.
