= Gary Hall Sr. =

American swimmer (born 1951)

Gary Hall Sr. OLY
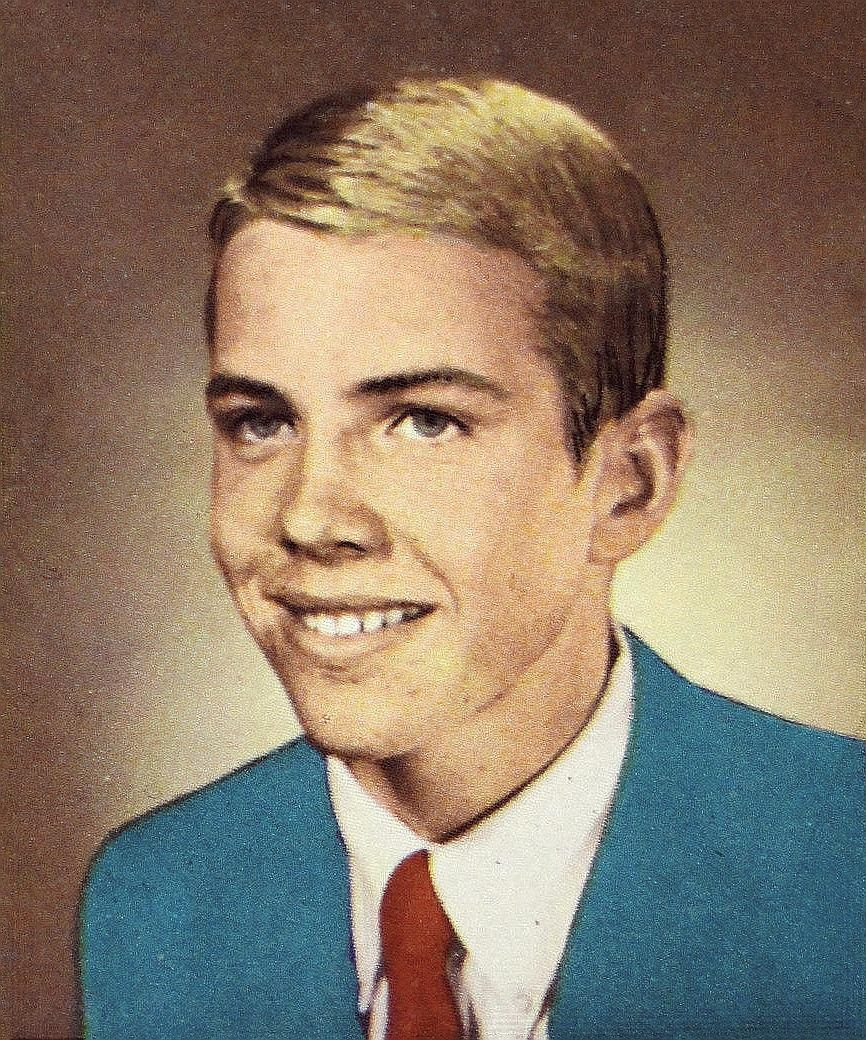
- Hall in c. 1972

Personal information
- Full name: Gary Wayne Hall Sr.
- National team: United States
- Born: August 7, 1951 (age 75) Fayetteville, North Carolina, U.S.
- Height: 6 ft 1 in (1.85 m)
- Weight: 163 lb (74 kg)

Sport
- Sport: Swimming
- Strokes: Butterfly, individual medley
- Club: Cincinnati Marlins
- College team: Indiana University
- Coach: James "Doc" Counsilman (Indiana)
Medal record
Representing the United States
Olympic Games
Silver medal – second place	1968 Mexico City	400 m medley
Silver medal – second place	1972 Munich	200 m butterfly
Bronze medal – third place	1976 Montreal	100 m butterfly

Gary Wayne Hall Sr. (born August 7, 1951) is an American former competitive swimmer, three-time Olympic medalist, and former world record-holder in five events. He is also a former ophthalmologist who lost his license after a long history of malpractice.

== Background ==
Hall attended Indiana University, where he swam for the Indiana Hoosiers swimming and diving team under coach Doc Counsilman. As a college swimmer, he specialized in the individual medley. Hall was elected captain of the Hoosiers swimming team in his senior year. In academics, Hall excelled in the classroom and was consistently cited by the NCAA as an outstanding example of student-athlete. He was accepted for medical school at the University of Cincinnati. He later became an ophthalmologist, and practiced in Phoenix, Arizona.

== 1968-1976 Olympics ==
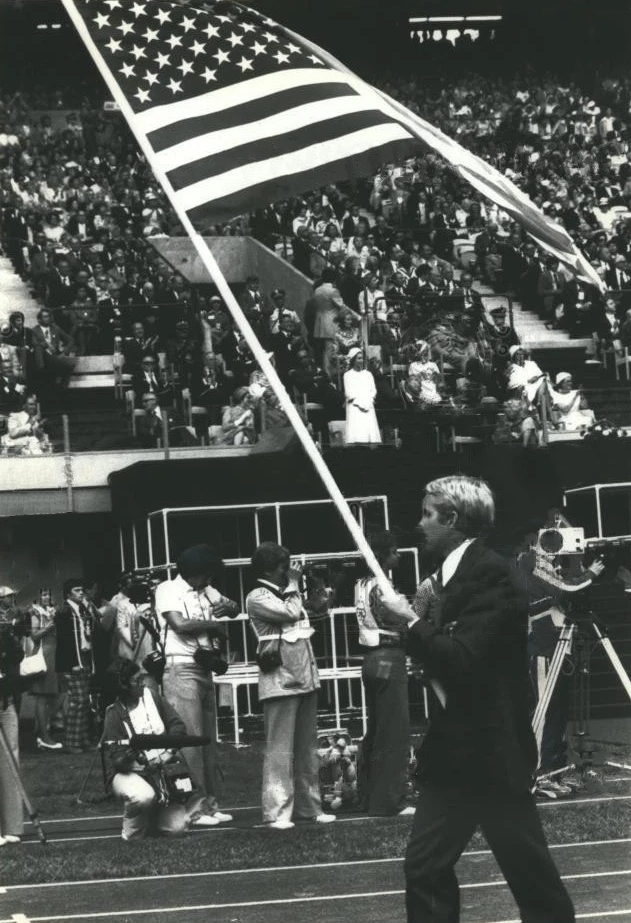
Hall as the U.S. flagbearer at the 1976 Olympics

Hall first represented the United States in the 1968 Summer Olympics held in Mexico City, Mexico, where he won a silver medal for his second-place finish in the men's 400-meter individual medley. Two years later he broke the world record in the 200-meter butterfly.

Hall made it a point to vigorously exercise in the swimming pool after daily med school classes. His wife, the former Mary Keating, being from a swimming family, understood his love of the water.

At the 1972 Summer Olympics in Munich, Germany, he earned a silver medal in the men's 200-meter butterfly. His final Olympic appearance was at the 1976 Summer Olympics in Montreal, Canada, capping his Olympic career with a bronze medal in the men's 100-meter butterfly. At the end of the Montreal Olympics, his fellow American athletes from all sports disciplines chose him to be the U.S. flagbearer in the closing ceremony.

== Ophthalmologist career ==
Hall graduated from the University of Cincinnati College of Medicine, located in Cincinnati, Ohio. He practiced as Gary Hall, MD as an ophthalmologist in Phoenix, Arizona at the Gary Hall Lasik Center. Common conditions he treated in ophthalmology included macular degeneration and cataracts.

== History of malpractice in ophthalmology ==
In January 1996, Hall was ordered by the Arizona Medical Board to spend three years on probation and to pay the board $10,000 to cover the costs of an investigation, the details of which are no longer on the board's site. In October 1999, he was placed on probation for three more years and was censured for unprofessional conduct, permanently prohibited from performing certain procedures, forced to take additional educational courses, and pay a penalty of $15,000. In April 2005, the Arizona Medical Board placed Hall on probation for another five years, with the demand that he never perform surgery again.

In October 2009, after being found in violation of the Arizona Medical Board's demands, the board stripped Hall of his medical license. The Board found that Hall had been guilty of unprofessional conduct, negligence, and incompetence in his practice.

A 1998 article from the Phoenix New Times indicated that Hall had 121 complaints lodged against him to the Arizona Medical Board since he began practicing in 1982. It is unknown how many complaints he had accumulated by 2009 when his license was finally revoked.

An article from the Los Angeles Times said that as of June 2000, Hall had paid over $5.3 million in medical malpractice claims and was listed 27 times in the federal database for medical malpractice.

== International Swimming Hall of Fame ==
In 1981, Hall was inducted into the International Swimming Hall of Fame as an "Honor Swimmer." Later on, he also became a local celebrity in Phoenix, as an ophthalmologist – appearing in his office's television ads and billboard campaigns.

His son Gary Hall Jr. became a famous Olympic swimmer as well, starting in the Atlanta 1996 Olympic Games, getting various gold medals at the 2000 Olympics in Sydney, Australia. With his son's participation at the 2004 Olympics in Athens, Greece, the Halls became the first father-and-son pair to make three Olympic appearances.

== Swimming camps ==
Gary Hall Sr. currently lives in San Diego and operates The Race Club swimming camps. The Race Club is a swimming club founded by Hall and his son Gary Hall Jr. The swimming club, originally known as "The World Team," was designed to serve as a swimming training group for elite swimmers across the world in preparation for the 2000 Sydney Olympic Games. To be able to train with The Race Club, one must either have been ranked in the top 20 in the world the past three calendar years or top three in their nation in the past year. The Race Club included such well-known swimmers as Roland Mark Schoeman, Mark Foster, Ryk Neethling, Milorad Čavić and Therese Alshammar. They were coached by University of Michigan coach Mike Bottom.

The Race Club provides facilities, swimming techniques coaching, swimming training programs, technical instruction, swimming technique videos, fitness and health programs for swimmers of all ages and abilities. The club's summer swim camps are designed and tailored to satisfy each swimmer's needs, whether one is trying to reach the Olympic Games or simply improve one's swimming techniques or fitness level. The swimming camps programs are suitable for beginner swimmers, pleasure swimmers, fitness swimmers, USA swimming or YMCA swimmers, or triathletes; anyone who wants to improve swimming skills.

== Charles Keating IV ==
Hall's nephew is Chief petty officer Charles Keating IV, a Navy SEAL, who was killed at age 31 in combat with ISIS in Iraq in 2016. He was posthumously awarded the Navy Cross for his actions in combat.

== See also ==
- List of Indiana University (Bloomington) people
- List of Olympic medalists in swimming (men)
- World record progression 200 metres backstroke
- World record progression 200 metres butterfly
- World record progression 200 metres individual medley
- World record progression 400 metres individual medley
- World record progression 4 × 200 metres freestyle relay

Olympic Games
Preceded by Cindy Nelson	United States Flagbearer; Montreal 1976	Succeeded by Scott Hamilton
Records
Preceded by Mark Spitz	Men's 200-meter butterfly world record-holder (long course); August 22, 1970 – August 27, 1971	Succeeded by Mark Spitz
Preceded by Charlie Hickcox	Men's 200-meter individual medley world record-holder (long course); August 17, 1969 – September 12, 1970	Succeeded by Gunnar Larsson
Preceded by Greg Buckingham; Charlie Hickcox	Men's 400-meter individual medley world record-holder (long course); July 20, 1968 – August 30, 1968; July 11, 1969 – August 20, 1974	Succeeded by Charlie Hickcox; András Hargitay
