= Mikhail Sukharev =

Russian swimmer

Personal information
- Nationality: Russian
- Born: 12 March 1953 (age 73) Astrakhan, Soviet Union

Sport
- Sport: Swimming

Mikhail Sukharev (born 12 March 1953) is a Russian former swimmer. He competed in two events at the 1972 Summer Olympics for the Soviet Union.
