= Charlie Hickcox =

American swimmer (1947–2010)

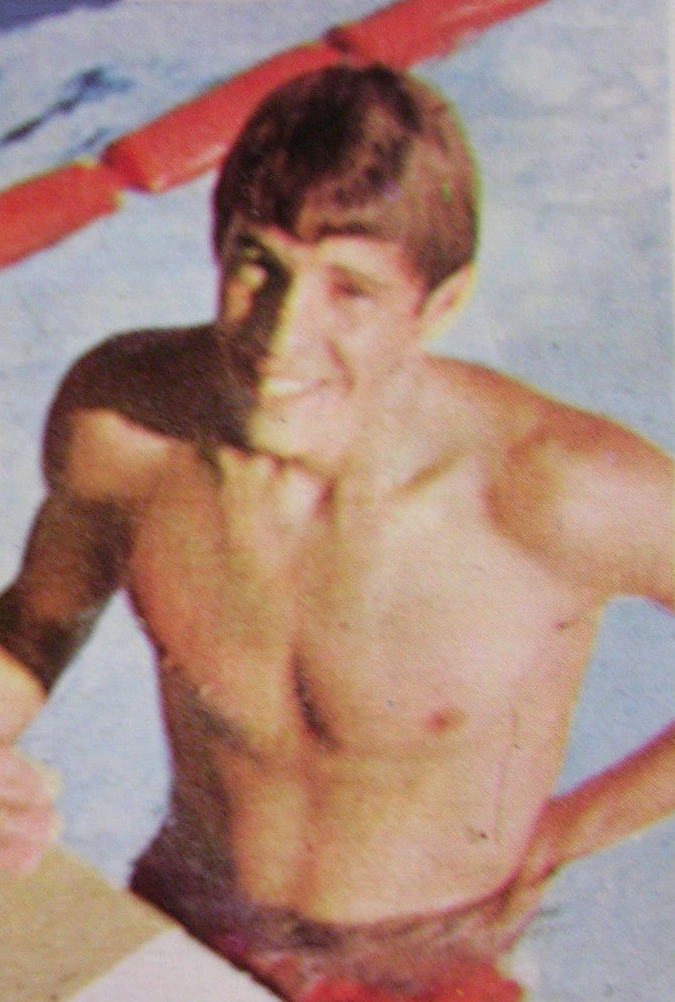
- Hickcox, c. 1968

Personal information
- Full name: Charles Buchanan Hickcox II
- Nickname: "Charlie"
- National team: United States
- Born: February 6, 1947 Phoenix, Arizona, U.S.
- Died: June 14, 2010 (aged 63) San Diego, California, U.S.
- Occupations: Law, Real Estate
- Height: 6 ft 3 in (1.91 m)
- Weight: 176 lb (80 kg)

Sport
- Sport: Swimming
- Strokes: Indiv. Medley, Backstroke, Freestyle,
- Club: Bloomington Swim Club
- College team: Indiana University
- Coach: James "Doc" Counsilman (IU)
Medal record
Men's swimming
Representing the United States
Olympic Games
Gold medal – first place	1968 Mexico City	200 m medley
Gold medal – first place	1968 Mexico City	400 m medley
Gold medal – first place	1968 Mexico City	4x100 m medley
Silver medal – second place	1968 Mexico City	100 m backstroke
Pan American Games
Gold medal – first place	1967 Winnipeg	100 m backstroke
Gold medal – first place	1967 Winnipeg	4x200 m freestyle
Silver medal – second place	1967 Winnipeg	200 m backstroke]
Universiade
Gold medal – first place	1967 Tokyo	100 m backstroke
Gold medal – first place	1967 Tokyo	200 m backstroke
Gold medal – first place	1967 Tokyo	4x200 m freestyle
Gold medal – first place	1967 Tokyo	4x100 m medley

Charles Buchanan Hickcox II (February 6, 1947 – June 14, 2010) was an American competition swimmer who swam for the University of Indiana, a three-time Olympic champion at the 1968 Mexico City Olympics, and a former world record-holder in six events.

== Early life ==
Hickcox was born in Phoenix, Arizona on February 6, 1947 to John Cole Hickcox Sr. and Mary Jane Shartel Hickcox. Four of his siblings competed in swimming during their High School years. Charlie attended Washington High School in greater Phoenix where he was an accomplished student with a rank of 30th in his Senior class of just under 500. He was on the varsity tennis team in his Junior year, and made the basketball team in his Senior year. In his last year at Washington High, he served as a Senior Class President, and was Key Club Vice President. He began competitive swimming in earnest around 1961, where he mentioned he was coached by Dick Suenning, though no other sources besides the Arizona Republic list Suenning as a coach. Hickcox set a state high school record in the 100-meter butterfly of 1:00.07 at the Saguaro Invitational in May, 1965. His summer training regiment included a practice session of around 3.5 hours, with winter training of around 1.5 hours daily.

== Indiana University ==
Hickcox attended Indiana University, and swam for the Indiana Hoosiers swimming and diving team in National Collegiate Athletic Association (NCAA) competition from 1967 to 1969. He won a total of seven individual NCAA national championships while swimming for Hoosiers coach Doc Counsilman. In the three years from 1967-1969, Hickcox earned Indiana varsity letters and contributed to 1968 and 1969 NCAA national team titles. He was an NCAA champion eight times, including titles in 1967 in the 100 and 200 backstroke, and in 1968 in the 200 individual medley, 100 backstroke, and 200 backstroke. In 1969 he won NCAA individual titles in the 200 individual medley and 200 backstroke, and swam with Indiana's NCAA championship 400 medley relay team. He was an NCAA All American a total of thirteen times. The peak of Hickcox's swimming career occurred between 1967 and 1968 when he set eight world records in the space of sixteen months.

== 1968 Mexico City Olympics ==
He received four medals, including three gold and one silver at the 1968 Summer Olympics in Mexico City. He tied with American Sharon Stouder for the second highest Olympic medal count of any swimmer to that date, placing second to Don Schollander of Yale who won four gold medals in 1964. Hickcox won a gold medal in the 200-meter Individual Medley with an Olympic record time of 2:12.0. He won a second gold in the 400-meter individual medley with a time of 4:48.4, beating second place American Gary Hall in a very close race by only 3 tenths of a second. Hickcox won a third gold as a member of the world record-setting U.S. team in the men's 4×100-meter medley relay. He added a silver medal in the men's 100-meter backstroke with a time of 1:00.2, taking second to Brittain's Roland Matthes who swam a 58.7.

Hickcox worked as a television and radio announcer and coached swimming in his early career. He completed studies at the Salmon P. Chase Law School, part of Northern Kentucky State University in Highland Heights, Kentucky, after graduating Indiana. While attending or shortly after attending law school, Hickcox briefly coached or co-coached the highly competitive Cincinnati Marlins age-group Swim team in 1973, very close to Highland Heights, Kentucky where he attended Law School. After graduating Law School, he was admitted to the Arizona Bar. Later, he had a commercial real estate career, and founded the Feldman-Hickcox Company, a real estate firm based in Scottsdale, Arizona.

=== Honors ===
Hickcox was named World Swimmer of the Year in 1968, and was inducted into the International Swimming Hall of Fame as an "Honor Swimmer" in 1976. He was inducted into the University of Indiana Athletic Hall of Fame in 1982 and the Arizona Sports Hall of Fame.

He was married to Olympic diver Lesley Bush, but they later divorced.

He died at his home in San Diego from cancer on June 14, 2010, at the age of 63. He was survived by his wife Kathy whom he married around 2003, children, grandchildren, and siblings. A memorial service was held July 10 at East Valley Bible Church in Gilbert, Arizona.

== See also ==
- List of Indiana University (Bloomington) people
- List of multiple Olympic gold medalists at a single Games
- List of Olympic medalists in swimming (men)
- World record progression 100 metres backstroke
- World record progression 200 metres backstroke
- World record progression 200 metres individual medley
- World record progression 400 metres individual medley
- World record progression 4 × 100 metres freestyle relay
- World record progression 4 × 100 metres medley relay

Records
Preceded by Doug Russell	Men's 100-meter backstroke world record-holder (long course); August 28, 1967 – September 21, 1967	Succeeded by Roland Matthes
Preceded by Gary Hall, Sr.	Men's 400-meter individual medley world record-holder (long course); August 30, 1968 – July 11, 1969	Succeeded by Gary Hall, Sr.
Preceded by Greg Buckingham	Men's 200-meter individual medley world record-holder (long course); August 31, 1968 – August 17, 1969	Succeeded by Gary Hall, Sr.
