= Alexander Charles Bertram =

Alexander Charles Bertram (1852 – August 30, 1908) born in the year 1852 in Charlottetown, to John Bertram a farmer and Mary Ann. He was a newspaperman from Prince Edward Island.

Bertram started his journalism career in 1866 with the Summerside Journal and Western Pioneer in Summerside, Prince Edward Island, where he stayed for five years. His next move was to Halifax, Nova Scotia, where he worked for a major newspapers. He moved to the North Sydney Herald in Nova Scotia and, by 1875, became the owner. He rapidly expanded the newspaper which also earned a reputation for its political coverage. His skills as a reporter were particularly reflected in the parliamentary news which he covered himself.

Bertram was president of the Nova Scotia Press Association for a time which reflected his stature within his profession as did his presidency of the Parliamentary Press Gallery in Ottawa. He was a prominent citizen of North Sydney and served as the mayor for a term. He was also a political power broker for the Cape Breton Island area and influenced John Sparrow David Thompson in many of his important appointments.
