= Péter Lázár =

Hungarian swimmer (1950–1980)

Personal information
- Born: 2 September 1950 Esztergom, Hungary
- Died: 9 December 1980 (aged 30)

Sport
- Sport: Swimming

Péter Lázár (2 September 1950 – 9 December 1980) was a Hungarian swimmer. He competed in three events at the 1968 Summer Olympics. He died in a car accident at the age of 30.
