= John McConnochie =

New Zealand swimmer

Personal information
- Born: 13 January 1954 (age 72) Dunedin, New Zealand

Sport
- Sport: Swimming

John McConnochie (born 13 January 1954) is a New Zealand swimmer. He competed at the 1972 Summer Olympics and the 1976 Summer Olympics. He was coached by Duncan Laing.
