= Jacek Krawczyk =

Polish swimmer

Personal information
- Born: 1 January 1949 (age 77) Katowice, Poland

Sport
- Sport: Swimming

Jacek Krawczyk (born 1 January 1949) is a Polish former butterfly and medley swimmer. He competed in three events at the 1968 Summer Olympics.
