= Valentyn Partyka =

Soviet swimmer and coach

Personal information
- Born: 29 April 1952 Kramatorsk, Ukraine
- Died: 28 October 2009 (aged 57) Kohtla-Järve, Estonia
- Height: 189 cm (6 ft 2 in)
- Weight: 81 kg (179 lb)

Sport
- Sport: Swimming
- Strokes: Freestyle, medley
- Club: Avangard Donetsk

Valentyn Partyka (Ukrainian: Валентин Партика, Estonian: Valentin Partõka, 29 April 1952 – 28 October 2009) was a Soviet swimmer and swimming coach.

== Career ==
Born in Ukraine, he competed for the Soviet Union in the 200 m and 400 m individual medley events at the 1972 Summer Olympics. He later moved to Estonia, and worked there as a swimming coach. His trainees included his daughter, Olympic swimmer Elina Partõka. He died of a heart attack aged 57.
