= Bertram Türpe =

German swimmer

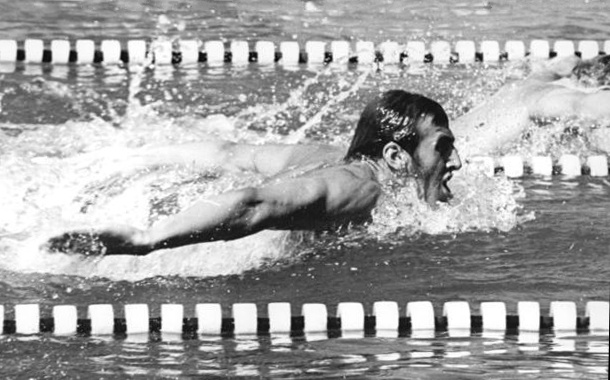
- Bertram Türpe in 1971

Personal information
- Born: 22 July 1952 Zingst, Germany
- Died: 11 January 2014 (aged 61)
- Height: 1.87 m (6 ft 2 in)
- Weight: 78 kg (172 lb)

Sport
- Sport: Swimming
- Club: SC DHfK, Leipzig

Bertram Türpe (22 July 1952 – 11 January 2014) was an East German swimmer. He competed at the 1972 Summer Olympics in the 200 m and 400 m individual medley, but failed to reach the finals. He won these two events at the national championships in 1971.
