= Andrey Dunayev =

Russian swimmer (1949–2015)

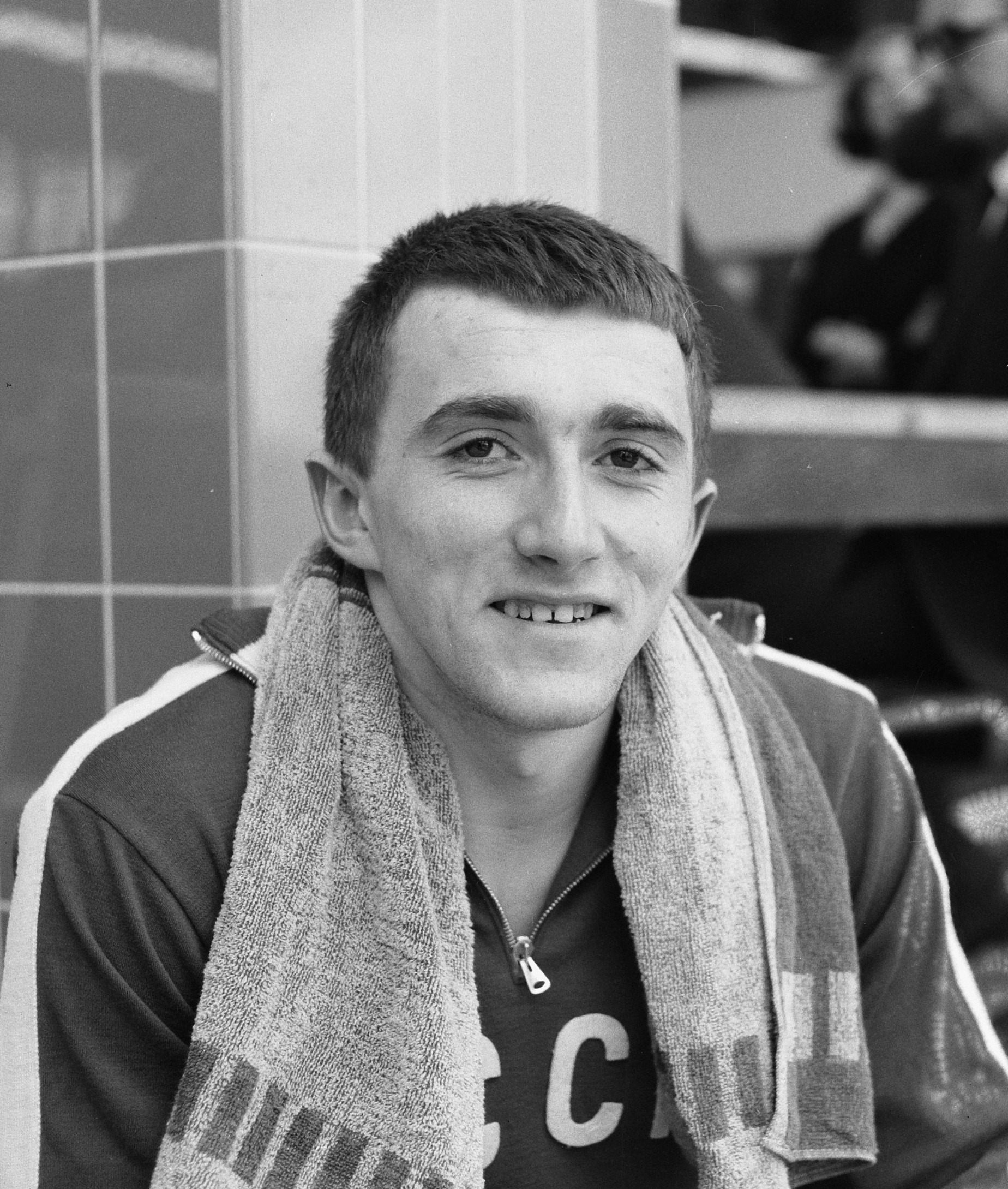
- Dunayev in 1966

Personal information
- Born: 14 May 1949 Moscow, Russia
- Died: 9 December 2015 (aged 66) Moscow, Russia
- Height: 1.76 m (5 ft 9 in)
- Weight: 69 kg (152 lb)

Sport
- Sport: Swimming
- Club: Spartak Moscow
Medal record
Representing Soviet Union
European Championships
Silver medal – second place	1966 Utrecht	400 m medley

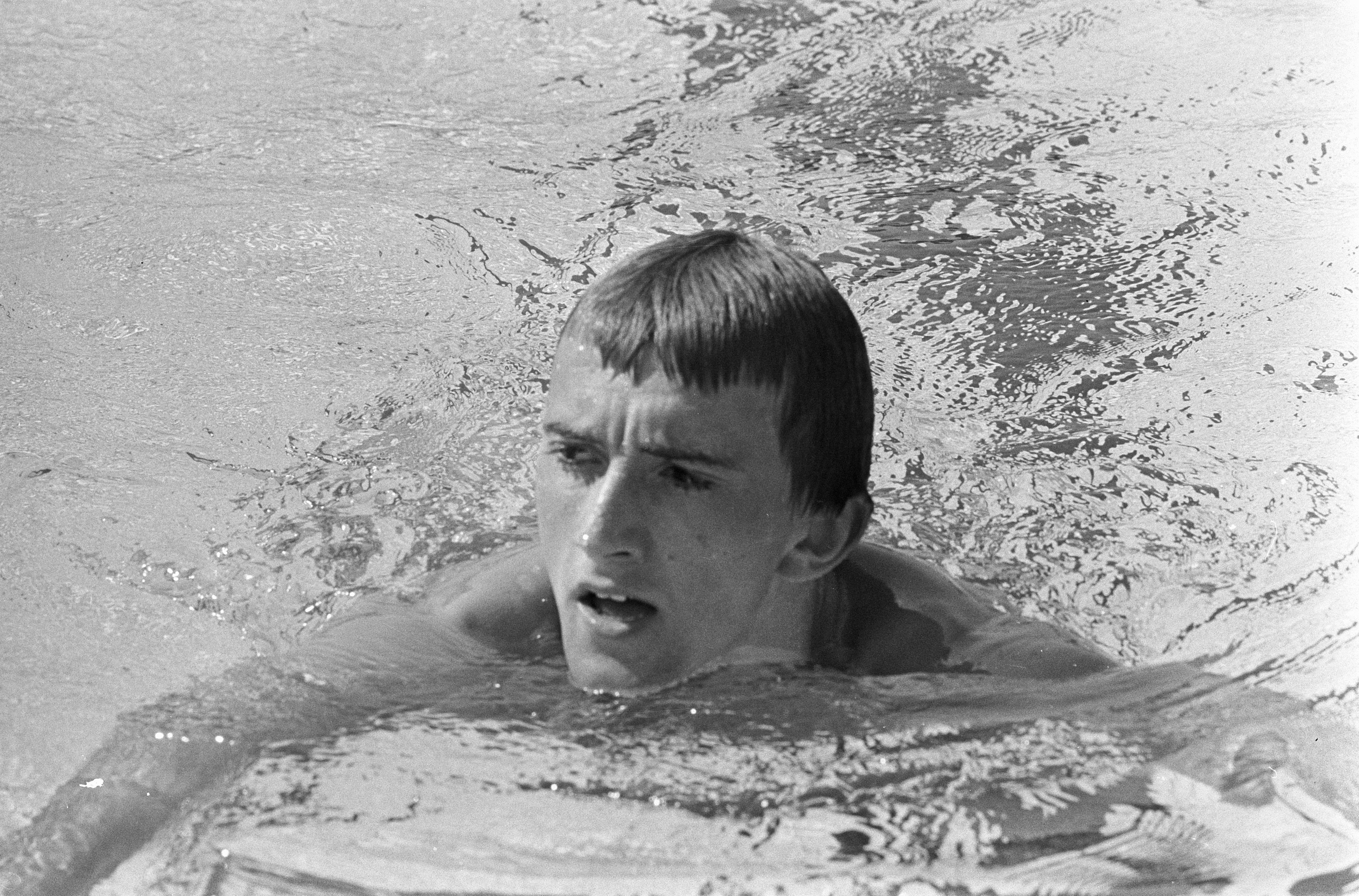
Dunayev in 1966

Andrey Yevgenyevich Dunayev (Russian: Андрей Евгеньевич Дунаев; 14 May 1949 – 9 December 2015) is a retired Russian swimmer who won the silver medal in 400 m medley at the 1966 European Aquatics Championships. Next year he set a new European record, and in 1968 a new world record in the same event, but finished only seventh at the 1968 Summer Olympics. Between 1964 and 1968 he won 10 national titles and set 9 national records in the 200 m and 400 m medley and 800 m and 1500 m freestyle events. In the 1990s, he also won national titles in the masters category.

== See also ==
- World record progression 400 metres medley
