= Guðmundur Gíslason =

Icelandic swimmer (born 1941)

Personal information
- Born: 19 January 1941 (age 85) Reykjavík, Iceland

Sport
- Sport: Swimming

Guðmundur Gíslason (born 19 January 1941) is an Icelandic former butterfly, freestyle and medley swimmer. He competed at the 1960, 1964, 1968 and the 1972 Summer Olympics.
