= 1973 Summer Universiade =

Multi-sport event in Moscow, Russia

VII Summer Universiade VII Летняя Универсиада
- Host city: Moscow, Soviet Union
- Nations: 73
- Athletes: 3,634
- Events: 114 in 10 sports
- Opening: August 15, 1973
- Closing: August 25, 1973
- Opened by: Leonid Brezhnev
- Torch lighter: Valery Brumel
- Main venue: Central Lenin Stadium

The 1973 Summer Universiade, also known as the VII Summer Universiade, took place in Moscow, Soviet Union.

== Sports ==
- Athletics (34)
- Basketball (2)
- Diving (4)
- Fencing (8)
- Gymnastics (14)
- Swimming (22)
- Tennis (5)
- Volleyball (2)
- Water polo (1)
- Wrestling (20)

== Venues at the 1973 Summer Universiade ==
- Athletics () (Central Lenin Stadium)
- Basketball () (Sport Palace of the Central Lenin Stadium)
- Diving () (Tchaika Pool)
- Gymnastics () (Sport Palace of the Central Lenin Stadium)
- Fencing () (Znamenskie Brother ring)
- Swimming () (Lenin Stadium Pool)
- Tennis () (Tennis City of the Central Lenin Stadium)
- Volleyball () (Sokolniki Palace)
- Water polo () (Swimming Palace)
- Wrestling () (University Ring)

== Medal table ==
* Host nation (Host nation)

Rank	Nation	Gold	Silver	Bronze	Total
1	Soviet Union (URS)*	69	35	31	135
2	United States (USA)	19	16	18	53
3	Romania (ROU)	3	8	6	17
4	Japan (JPN)	3	8	1	12
5	Poland (POL)	2	3	5	10
6	Great Britain (GBR)	2	3	1	6
7	Cuba (CUB)	2	2	1	5
7	Czechoslovakia (TCH)	2	2	1	5
9	Italy (ITA)	2	0	6	8
10	Finland (FIN)	2	0	0	2
11	Hungary (HUN)	1	9	4	14
12	Bulgaria (BUL)	1	7	7	15
13	West Germany (FRG)	1	4	8	13
14	East Germany (GDR)	1	3	8	12
15	France (FRA)	1	2	1	4
16	Yugoslavia (YUG)	1	1	2	4
17	Mongolia (MGL)	1	0	1	2
18	Iran (IRN)	0	4	0	4
19	Canada (CAN)	0	2	5	7
20	Australia (AUS)	0	1	3	4
21	Netherlands (NED)	0	1	0	1
22	Brazil (BRA)	0	0	4	4
23	South Korea (KOR)	0	0	2	2
24	India (IND)	0	0	1	1
24	Kenya (KEN)	0	0	1	1
24	Mexico (MEX)	0	0	1	1
Totals (26 entries)		113	111	118	342
