= Swimming at the 1975 World Aquatics Championships =

These are the results of the swimming competition at the 1975 World Aquatics Championships.

== Medal table ==
Rank	Nation	Gold	Silver	Bronze	Total
1	United States (USA)	11	11	9	31
2	East Germany (GDR)	11	7	5	23
3	Hungary (HUN)	3	0	0	3
4	Great Britain (GBR)	2	1	5	8
5	West Germany (FRG)	1	2	1	4
6	Australia (AUS)	1	2	0	3
7	Netherlands (NED)	0	2	3	5
7	Soviet Union (URS)	0	2	3	5
9	Canada (CAN)	0	1	2	3
10	Japan (JPN)	0	1	0	1
11	Italy (ITA)	0	0	1	1
Totals (11 entries)		29	29	29	87

== Medal summary ==
=== Men ===
Event	Gold		Silver		Bronze	
100 m freestyle	Andy Coan; United States	51.25; CR	Vladimir Bure; Soviet Union	51.32	Jim Montgomery; United States	51.44
200 m freestyle	Tim Shaw; United States	1:51.04; CR	Bruce Furniss; United States	1:51.72	Brian Brinkley; Great Britain	1:53.56
400 m freestyle	Tim Shaw; United States	3:54.88; CR	Bruce Furniss; United States	3:57.71	Frank Pfütze; East Germany	4:01.10
1500 m freestyle	Tim Shaw; United States	15:28.92; CR	Brian Goodell; United States	15:39.00	David Parker; Great Britain	15:58.21
100 m backstroke	Roland Matthes; East Germany	58.15	John Murphy; United States	58.34	Mel Nash; United States	58.38
200 m backstroke	Zoltán Verrasztó; Hungary	2:05.05	Mark Tonelli; Australia	2:05.78	Paul Hove; United States	2:06.49
100 m breaststroke	David Wilkie; Great Britain	1:04.26	Nobutaka Taguchi; Japan	1:05.04	David Leigh; Great Britain	1:05.32
200 m breaststroke	David Wilkie; Great Britain	2:18.23; CR	Rick Colella; United States	2:21.60	Nikolay Pankin; Soviet Union	2:21.75
100 m butterfly	Gregory Jagenburg; United States	55.63; CR	Roger Pyttel; East Germany	56.04	Bill Forrester; United States	56.07
200 m butterfly	Bill Forrester; United States	2:01.95; CR	Roger Pyttel; East Germany	2:02.22	Brian Brinkley; Great Britain	2:02.47
200 m individual medley	András Hargitay; Hungary	2:07.72; CR	Steve Furniss; United States	2:07.75	Andrey Smirnov; Soviet Union	2:08.52
400 m individual medley	András Hargitay; Hungary	4:32.57	Andrey Smirnov; Soviet Union	4:35.64	Hans-Joachim Geisler; West Germany	4:36.40
4 × 100 m freestyle relay	United States; Bruce Furniss; James Montgomery; Andy Coan; John Murphy	3:24.85; WR	West Germany; Klaus Steinbach; Dirk Braunleder; Kersten Meier; Peter Nocke	3:29.55	Italy; Roberto Pangaro; Paolo Barelli; Claudio Zei; Marcello Guarducci	3:31.85
4 × 200 m freestyle relay	West Germany; Klaus Steinbach; Werner Lampe; Hans Joachim Geissler; Peter Nocke	7:39.44	Great Britain; Alan McClatchey; Gary Jameson; Gordon Downie; Brian Brinkley	7:42.55	Soviet Union; Alexandre Samsonov; Anatoly Rybakov; Viktor Aboimov; Andrei Krilov	7:43.58
4 × 100 m medley relay	United States; John Murphy; Rick Colella; Gregory Jagenburg; Andy Coan	3:49.00; CR	West Germany; Klaus Steinbach; Walter Kusch; Michael Kraus; Peter Nocke	3:51.85	Great Britain; James Carter; David Wilkie; Brian Brinkley; Gordon Downie	3:52.80

Legend: WR – World record; CR – Championship record

=== Women ===
Event	Gold		Silver		Bronze	
100 m freestyle	Kornelia Ender; East Germany	56.50; CR	Shirley Babashoff; United States	57.81	Enith Brigitha; Netherlands	58.20
200 m freestyle	Shirley Babashoff; United States	2:02.50; CR	Kornelia Ender; East Germany	2:02.69	Enith Brigitha; Netherlands	2:03.92
400 m freestyle	Shirley Babashoff; United States	4:16.87; CR	Jenny Turrall; Australia	4:17.88	Kathy Heddy; United States	4:18.03
800 m freestyle	Jenny Turrall; Australia	8:44.75; CR	Heather Greenwood; United States	8:48.88	Shirley Babashoff; United States	8:53.22
100 m backstroke	Ulrike Richter; East Germany	1:03.30; CR	Birgit Treiber; East Germany	1:04.34	Nancy Garapick; Canada	1:04.73
200 m backstroke	Birgit Treiber; East Germany	2:15.46; WR	Nancy Garapick; Canada	2:16.09	Ulrike Richter; East Germany	2:18.76
100 m breaststroke	Hannelore Anke; East Germany	1:12.72; CR	Wijda Mazereeuw; Netherlands	1:14.29	Marcia Morey; United States	1:15.00
200 m breaststroke	Hannelore Anke; East Germany	2:37.25; CR	Wijda Mazereeuw; Netherlands	2:37.50	Karla Linke; East Germany	2:38.28
100 m butterfly	Kornelia Ender; East Germany	1:01.24; WR	Rosemarie Kother; East Germany	1:01.80	Camille Wright; United States	1:02.79
200 m butterfly	Rosemarie Kother; East Germany	2:13.82	Valerie Lee; United States	2:14.89	Gabriele Wusche; East Germany	2:15.96
200 m individual medley	Kathy Heddy; United States	2:19.80; CR	Ulrike Tauber; East Germany	2:20.40	Angela Franke; East Germany	2:20.81
400 m individual medley	Ulrike Tauber; East Germany	4:52.76; CR	Karla Linke; East Germany	4:57.83	Kathy Heddy; United States	5:00.46
4 × 100 m freestyle relay	East Germany; Kornelia Ender; Barbara Krause; Claudia Hempel; Ute Brückner	3:49.37; WR	United States; Kathy Heddy; Karen Reeser; Kelly Powell; Shirley Babashoff	3:50.74	Canada; Gail Amundrud; Jill Quirk; Becky Smith; Anne Jardin	3:53.37
4 × 100 m medley relay	East Germany; Ulrike Richter; Hannelore Anke; Rosemarie Kother; Kornelia Ender	4:14.74; CR	United States; Linda Jezek; Marcia Morey; Camille Wright; Shirley Babashoff	4:20.47	Netherlands; Paula Eijk; Wanda Mazereeuw; Jose Damen; Enith Brigitha	4:21.45

Legend: WR – World record; CR – Championship record
