= Swimming at the 1976 Summer Olympics – Men's 400 metre individual medley =

Men's 400 metre individual medley at the Games of the XXI Olympiad
- Venue: Olympic Pool, Montreal
- Date: 25 July 1976 (heats & final)
- Competitors: 33 from 20 nations
- Winning time: 4:23.68 WR

Medalists
| 1st place, gold medalist(s) | | Rod Strachan | United States |
| 2nd place, silver medalist(s) | | Tim McKee | United States |
| 3rd place, bronze medalist(s) | | Andrey Smirnov | Soviet Union |

The men's 400 meter individual medley event for the 1976 Summer Olympics was held in Montreal. The event took place on 25 July.

== Heats ==
Heat 1

| Rank | Athlete | Country | Time | Notes |
|---|---|---|---|---|
| 1 | Steve Furniss | United States | 4:27.76 | Q, OR |
| 2 | Bill Sawchuk | Canada | 4:32.65 | |
| 3 | Alan McClatchey | Great Britain | 4:34.31 | |
| 4 | John McConnochie | New Zealand | 4:40.84 | |
| 5 | Gunnar Gundersen | Norway | 4:41.05 | |
| - | Patrick Novaretti | Monaco | - | DQ |

Heat 2

| Rank | Athlete | Country | Time | Notes |
|---|---|---|---|---|
| 1 | Tim McKee | United States | 4:29.14 | Q |
| 2 | Andy Ritchie | Canada | 4:31.34 | Q |
| 3 | Tsuyoshi Yanagidate | Japan | 4:39.27 | |
| 4 | José-Ricardo de Jesús | Puerto Rico | 4:42.07 | |
| 5 | Ronald Woutering | Netherlands | 4:46.76 | |
| - | Mikhail Gorelik | Soviet Union | - | DQ |

Heat 3

| Rank | Athlete | Country | Time | Notes |
|---|---|---|---|---|
| 1 | Rod Strachan | United States | 4:27.15 | Q, OR |
| 2 | Graham Smith | Canada | 4:31.29 | Q |
| 3 | Miloslav Roľko | Czechoslovakia | 4:35.21 | |
| 4 | Jeff Van de Graaf | Australia | 4:35.83 | |
| 5 | Duncan Cleworth | Great Britain | 4:42.25 | |
| 6 | François Deley | Belgium | 4:43.09 | |
| 7 | António de Melo | Portugal | 5:11.48 | |

Heat 4

| Rank | Athlete | Country | Time | Notes |
|---|---|---|---|---|
| 1 | András Hargitay | Hungary | 4:28.96 | Q |
| 2 | Hans-Joachim Geisler | West Germany | 4:31.37 | Q |
| 3 | Peter Dawson | Australia | 4:33.01 | |
| 4 | Csaba Sós | Hungary | 4:34.72 | |
| 5 | Ricardo Marmolejo | Mexico | 4:45.30 | |
| 6 | Dov Nisman | Israel | 4:47.13 | |
| 7 | Edwin Borja | Philippines | 4:52.21 | |

Heat 5

| Rank | Athlete | Country | Time | Notes |
|---|---|---|---|---|
| 1 | Andrey Smirnov | Soviet Union | 4:29.92 | Q |
| 2 | Anatoly Smirnov | Soviet Union | 4:33.88 | |
| 3 | Mark Treffers | New Zealand | 4:40.92 | |
| 4 | Jim Carter | Great Britain | 4:41.25 | |
| 5 | Julio Abreu | Paraguay | 4:46.69 | |
| 6 | Zoltán Verrasztó | Hungary | 4:48.51 | |
| 7 | Guillermo Zavala | Mexico | 4:49.55 | |

== Final ==
| Rank | Athlete | Country | Time | Notes |
|---|---|---|---|---|
| 1 | Rod Strachan | United States | 4:23.68 | WR |
| 2 | Tim McKee | United States | 4:24.62 | |
| 3 | Andrey Smirnov | Soviet Union | 4:26.90 | |
| 4 | András Hargitay | Hungary | 4:27.13 | |
| 5 | Graham Smith | Canada | 4:28.64 | |
| 6 | Steve Furniss | United States | 4:29.23 | |
| 7 | Andy Ritchie | Canada | 4:29.87 | |
| 8 | Hans-Joachim Geisler | West Germany | 4:34.95 | |
