= Swimming at the 1973 World Aquatics Championships – Men's 400 metre individual medley =

Men's 400 metre individual medley at the 1973 World Aquatics Championships
- Dates: September 5, 1973
- Competitors: 29 from 22 nations
- Winning time: 4:31.11 CR

Medalists
gold medal	András Hargitay	Hungary
silver medal	Rod Strachan	United States
bronze medal	Rick Colella	United States

The men's 400 metre individual medley competition of the swimming events at the 1973 World Aquatics Championships took place on September 5.

== Records ==
Prior to the competition, the existing world and championship records were as follows.

World record	Gary Hall, Sr. (USA)	4:30.81	Chicago, United States	3 August 1972
Competition record	N/A	N/A	N/A	N/A

The following records were established during the competition:

Date	Event	Name	Nationality	Time	Record
5 September	Heat 1	András Hargitay	Hungary	4:38.96	CR
5 September	Heat 4	Rick Colella	United States	4:38.50	CR
5 September	Final	András Hargitay	Hungary	4:31.11	CR

== Results ==
=== Heats ===
29 swimmers participated in 4 heats, qualified swimmers are listed:

Rank	Heat	Lane	Name	Nationality	Time	Notes
1	4	-	Rick Colella	United States	4:38.50	Q, CR
2	1	-	András Hargitay	Hungary	4:38.96	Q, CR
3	3	-	Rod Strachan	United States	4:40.06	Q
4	4	-	Bengt Gingsjö	Sweden	4:41.23	Q
5	1	-	Wolfram Sperling	East Germany	4:41.83	Q
6	3	-	Sergey Zakharov	Soviet Union	4:41.96	Q
7	4	-	Anatoly Smirnov	Soviet Union	4:42.65	Q
8	2	-	Brian Brinkley	Great Britain	4:43.54	Q
9	1	-	Neil Martin	Australia	4:44.55	
10	3	-	Patrick Moreau	France	4:45.14	
11	4	-	Csaba Sós	Hungary	4:45.29	
12	3	-	David Brumwell	Canada	4:45.52	
13	1	-	Anders Bellbring	Sweden	4:46.56	
14	2	-	Hans-Joachim Geisler	West Germany	4:47.68	
15	3	-	Ignacio Álvarez	Mexico	4:48.96	
16	4	-	Tsuyoshi Yanagidate	Japan	4:49.24	
17	1	-	Gunnar Gundersen	Norway	4:51.46	
18	2	-	Peter Tetlow	Australia	4:51.98	
19	1	-	Lorenzo Marugo	Italy	4:51.98	
20	4	-	Paul Hughes	Canada	4:52.00	
21	2	-	François Deley	Belgium	4:52.91	
22	2	-	Mark Treffers	New Zealand	4:55.35	
23	3	-	Antônio Azevedo	Brazil	4:56.24	
24	3	-	Ali Gharbi	Tunisia	5:04.13	
25	3	-	Evangelos Koskinas	Greece	5:07.35	
26	2	-	Angel Chakarov	Bulgaria	5:08.22	
27	4	-	Carlos Santiago	Puerto Rico	5:08.66	
28	1	-	Francisco Canales	Puerto Rico	5:09.52	
29	2	-	C. Manochehr	Iran	5:41.12	
–	2	-	Christian Leitzmann	East Germany	Did not finish^{[1]}	
–	1	-	L. Diaz	Argentina	Did not start	
–	4	-	Bandi Wetternek	Romania	Did not start	

^{1} Christian Leitzmann, almost at the end at the butterfly leg, swallowed some water and abandoned the race.

=== Final ===
The results of the final are below.

Rank	Lane	Name	Nationality	Time	Notes
1st place, gold medalist(s)	-	András Hargitay	Hungary	4:31.11	CR, ER
2nd place, silver medalist(s)	-	Rod Strachan	United States	4:33.50	
3rd place, bronze medalist(s)	-	Rick Colella	United States	4:34.68	
4	-	Sergey Zakharov	Soviet Union	4:37.05	
5	-	Wolfram Sperling	East Germany	4:37.17	
6	-	Bengt Gingsjö	Sweden	4:37.62	
7	-	Brian Brinkley	Great Britain	4:40.94	NR
8	-	Anatoly Smirnov	Soviet Union	4:41.26	
