= Lietzmann =

Lietzmann is a surname. Notable people with the surname include:

- Christian Lietzmann (1955–2006), German swimmer
- Hans Lietzmann (1875–1942), German Protestant theologian and church historian
