= Fiebig =

Fiebig is a German surname. Notable people with the surname include:

- Anett Fiebig (born 1961), German swimmer
- Frédéric Fiebig (1885–1953), Latvian-born French painter
- Frederick Fiebig, 19th-century German photographer
- Heinz Fiebig (1897–1964), German general
- Kurt Fiebig (1908–1988), German composer
- Leonie Fiebig (born 1990), German bobsledder
- Martin Fiebig (1891–1947), German general
- Taryn Fiebig (1972–2021), Australian opera soprano
