= Igor Potyakin =

Personal information
- Born: September 14, 1955 Samara, Russia
- Died: April 25, 2025

Sport
- Sport: Swimming
- Club: Dynamo
Medal record
Representing Soviet Union
European Championships
Bronze medal – third place	1974 Vienna	4×100 m medley
Universiade
Silver medal – second place	1973 Moscow	4×100 m medley
Silver medal – second place	1973 Moscow	100 m backstroke

Igor Anatolievich Potyakin (Russian: Игорь Анатольевич Потякин; 14 September 1955 – 25 April 2025) was a Russian backstroke swimmer who won a bronze medal in the 4×100 m medley relay at the 1974 European Aquatics Championships. During his career he won six national titles in the 100 m (1973–1976) and 200 m backstroke (1974) and 4×100 m medley relay (1974).

He graduated from the Samara Polytechnic University. After retirement from senior swimming he competed in the masters category and won a national title in 1996.
