= Dick Jochums =

American swimmer and swim coach

Biographical details
- Born: Circa January 1, 1941
- Died: August 19, 2022 (aged 81); California, U.S.
- Education: University of Washington

Playing career
- Positions: Freestyle, Individual Medley

Coaching career (HC unless noted)
- 1960's: University of Washington; Asst. Coach
- 1960's: University of California Berkeley; Asst. Coach
- 1960's: California State, Hayward; Head coach
- 1971–1978: Long Beach State; Long Beach Swim Club
- 1978–1988: University of Arizona
- 1995–2007: Santa Clara Swim Club

Accomplishments and honors

Championships
- Conference Titles 1975–1978 (Long Beach State); National Titles 96–98 (Santa Clara Swim)

Awards
- American Swim Coaches Hall of Fame 2004; International Swimming Hall of Fame 2017

Dick Jochums (c. January 1, 1941 – August 19, 2022) was an American competitive swimmer for the University of Washington and a collegiate and club Hall of Fame swimming coach, who served as the head coach for the University of Arizona swim team from 1978 to 1988. He was Head Coach of the renowned Santa Clara Swim Club from 1995 to 2007, where he led the team to three national championships from 1996 to 1998.

== Competitive swimming ==
From 1955 to 1959, Jochums swam for Berkeley High School, was a swimming All-American, and competed and excelled in multiple strokes. In 1959, around his Senior year at Berkeley High, he helped set a school record in the 200 Medley Relay of 1:56.7.

His first swimming teacher and coach was Berkeley Women's City Club's Laurabelle Bookstaver who taught him a love of the sport. Swimming for the Berkeley City Club, under Head Coach Laurabelle Bookstaver in March, 1959, he swam a respectable 52.5 for the 100-yard freestyle in a regular meet and anchored a winning 200 free relay. Around the summer after his Senior year at Berkeley High, he swam freestyle anchor in a 4x100 Medley Relay for the Berkeley City Club at the National AAU Outdoor Swimming Championships the week of July 10, 1959 in Los Altos Hills, California.

=== Swimming for Washington University ===
After receiving a swimming scholarship to Washington University, in his first year beginning around the fall of 1959, he held six Washington Freshman records, and two pool records. At 17, he set a new National Freshman collegiate record for the 200 yard Individual Medley with a 2:14.9. Around his Junior year at Washington in March 1962, he was on a record breaking 4x100 freestyle relay team that clocked a mark of 3:21.5 for the event at the Far West Swimming and Diving Championships in Pullman, Washington.

After starting at Washington, in the August 1960 Long Course Junior Olympics in Fresno, California, Jochums took a sixth in the 100-meter free, a seventh in the 100-meter back, and 200 individual medley, and an eighth in the 200-meter free. In March 1963, he won the 50-yard freestyle for the defending champion Washington Huskies with a time of 22.5 seconds, at the Far Western Swimming Championships in Seattle.

His coach at the University of Washington was John Tallman, where Jochums was a three-time All-America swimmer. Jochums, completing his studies at Washington, graduated with both a B.A. and M.S.

== Collegiate coaching ==
Jochums had around twenty years as a college coach. He first worked as an assistant coach at the University of Washington, and then assistant coached at the University of California at Berkeley, under Head Coach Pete Cutino. Jochums took his first job as a Head Coach at Cal State Hayward, after completing his Ph.D. in Education from the University of California at Berkeley. While working as head coach at Cal-State Hayward, he started the Concord Swim Club, now known as the Terrapin Swim Club.

From Cal State Hayward, he went to Long Beach State, where he followed Hall of Fame Coach Don Gambril as head coach in 1971 through 1978, and also coached for the highly successful Long Beach Swim Club, where Gambril had also coached. Gambrill had selected Jochums as his successor. At Long Beach State, he led the swimming program to four consecutive conference championships from 1975–78 and three NCAA appearances. In 1974, in his early years as coach, he was named ASCA Coach of the Year. The equally distinguished Long Beach Swim Club captured the National AAU title in the spring of 1975.

=== University of Arizona ===
Jochums took over at the University of Arizona in 1978 and remained through 1988. In his first year of coaching at Arizona, he was named Women's Pac-10 Coach of the Year, and led his team to a sixth-place finish at the Pac-10 meet and a 13th place in the NCAA championships. In 1978, Jochum's men's team finished sixth at the NCAA Championships. Jochum's best known swimmers at the University of Arizona, included George DiCarlo, Peter Evans, Glen Patching, Doug Towne, Arizona's first NCAA Champion, Bob Jackson, and Tim Shaw, a Sullivan Award Winner. DiCarlo, Evans and Shaw were Olympians.

As determined by University of Arizona Athletic Director, Cedric Dempsey, in December 1988, Jochums resigned over a rules violation for using an ineligible swimmer at a meet. A few swim fans considered Jochums' resignation and the University of Arizona's actions excessive. Jochums left swim coaching as a profession for six years.

=== Santa Clara Swim Club ===
From 1995 to 2007, Jochums coached the Santa Clara Swim Club. He named John Bitter, with whom he had coached at the University of Arizona as an Assistant. During his tenure, Jochums led the nationally recognized team to Summer Long Course Men's National Championships in 1996, 1997 and 1998.

Jochums completed 12 top-10 national finishes in his 20 years in college swimming. In his career, Jochums was the Assistant or Head Coach for eight US Swimming National Teams.

=== Outstanding swimmers coached ===
Jochums coached Olympic gold medalist George DiCarlo, and 1976 Olympian Tim Shaw, and 1980 and 1984 Olympic medalist Peter Evans. He also coached 2000 Olympic medalist Tom Wilkens, and potential 1980 Olympic medal contenders Bob Jackson, and Greg Jagenburg who may have won medals had the 1980 Moscow Olympics not been boycotted. He also mentored Steve Gregg and Hall of Fame Swimmer Bruce Furniss.

By 1988, Jochums had coached swimmers in the 1972, 1976, 1980, and 1984 Olympics. His less known Olympic swimming participants included 1972 Olympic Swimmer Lynn Skrifvars, and 1980 Olympic swimmer Doug Northway. In the 1976 Montreal Olympics, five of Jochum's swimmers received medals and a total of seven participated.

Jochums died in Northern California on August 19, 2022. He and his wife Mara of over forty years had one son, three daughters, and three grandsons.

=== Honors ===
Jochums was a 1974 Coach of the Year, named by the American Swim Coaches Association (ASCA). In 2004, he was inducted into the ASCA Hall of Fame, and in a rarer distinction in 2017 was selected for the International Swimming Hall of Fame in Fort Lauderdale. In 2019, he became a member of the Aquatic Capital of America Hall of Fame, in Long Beach.
