= 1977 European Aquatics Championships =

Water sport competitions

14th European Aquatics Championships
- Host city: Jönköping
- Country: Sweden
- Events: 37
- Opening: 14 August 1977
- Closing: 21 August 1977

The 1977 European Aquatics Championships were held at the swimming complex Rosenlundsbadet in the southern Swedish city of Jönköping, from 14 August to 21 August. Besides swimming, there were titles contested in diving, the women's event of synchronized swimming and the men's event of water polo.

== Medal table ==
* Host nation (Sweden)

Rank	Nation	Gold	Silver	Bronze	Total
1	East Germany	16	11	7	34
2	Soviet Union	7	9	7	23
3	West Germany	7	2	4	13
4	Hungary	3	1	1	5
5	Great Britain	2	1	5	8
6	Netherlands	1	6	2	9
7	Czechoslovakia	1	1	0	2
8	Italy	0	3	3	6
9	Sweden*	0	1	3	4
10	Yugoslavia	0	1	1	2
11	Denmark	0	1	0	1
12	Switzerland	0	0	3	3
13	Romania	0	0	1	1
Totals (13 entries)		37	37	37	111

== Swimming ==
=== Men's events ===
Event	Gold	Silver	Bronze
100 m freestyle	Peter Nocke (FRG)	Vladimir Bure (URS)	Marcello Guarducci (ITA)
200 m freestyle	Peter Nocke (FRG)	Andrey Krylov (URS)	Marcello Guarducci (ITA)
400 m freestyle	Sergey Rusin (URS)	Frank Wennmann (FRG)	Frank Pfütze (GDR)
1500 m freestyle	Vladimir Salnikov (URS)	Valentin Parinov (URS)	Borut Petrič (YUG)
100 m backstroke	Miloslav Rolko (TCH)	Zoltán Verrasztó (HUN)	Klaus Steinbach (FRG)
200 m backstroke	Zoltán Verrasztó (HUN)	Miloslav Rolko (TCH)	Jan Thorell (SWE)
100 m breaststroke	Gerald Mörken (FRG)	Giorgio Lalle (ITA)	Walter Kusch (FRG)
200 m breaststroke	Gerald Mörken (FRG)	Arsens Miskarovs (URS)	Walter Kusch (FRG)
100 m butterfly	Roger Pyttel (GDR)	Pär Arvidsson (SWE)	John Mills (GBR)
200 m butterfly	Michael Kraus (FRG)	Roger Pyttel (GDR)	Pär Arvidsson (SWE)
200 m individual medley	András Hargitay (HUN)	Andrey Smirnov (URS)	Aleksandr Sidorenko (URS)
400 m individual medley	Sergey Fesenko (URS)	Andrey Smirnov (URS)	Csaba Sós (HUN)
4 × 100 m freestyle	West Germany; Klaus Steinbach; Andreas Schmidt; Jürgen Könnecker; Peter Nocke	Italy; Roberto Pangaro; Paolo Revelli; Paolo Sinegaelia; Marcello Guarducci	Soviet Union; Vladimir Bure; Sergey Labzo; Sergey Kopliakov; Andrey Krylov
4 × 200 m freestyle	Soviet Union; Vladimir Raskatov; Sergey Rusin; Sergey Kopliakov; Andrey Krylov	West Germany; Frank Wennmann; Klaus Steinbach; Peter Knust; Peter Nocke	East Germany; Rainer Strohbach; Roger Pyttel; Detlev Grabs; Frank Pfutze
4 × 100 m medley	West Germany; Klaus Steinbach; Gerald Mörken; Michael Kraus; Peter Nocke	East Germany; Lutz Wanja; Gregor Arnicke; Roger Pyttel; René Pläschke	Great Britain; James Carter; Duncan Goodhew; John Mills; Martin Smith

=== Women's events ===
Event	Gold	Silver	Bronze
100 m freestyle	Barbara Krause (GDR)	Enith Brigitha (NED)	Petra Priemer (GDR)
200 m freestyle	Petra Thümer (GDR)	Barbara Krause (GDR)	Annelies Maas (NED)
400 m freestyle	Petra Thümer (GDR)	Annelies Maas (NED)	Barbara Krause (GDR)
800 m freestyle	Petra Thümer (GDR)	Annelies Maas (NED)	Marina Altmann (GDR)
100 m backstroke	Birgit Treiber (GDR)	Ulrike Richter (GDR)	Kaire Indrikson (URS)
200 m backstroke	Birgit Treiber (GDR)	Ulrike Richter (GDR)	Carmen Bunaciu (ROU)
100 m breaststroke	Yuliya Bogdanova (URS)	Carola Nitschke (GDR)	Ramona Reinke (GDR)
200 m breaststroke	Yuliya Bogdanova (URS)	Susanne Nielsson (DEN)	Eva-Marie Håkansson (SWE)
100 m butterfly	Andrea Pollack (GDR)	Christiane Knacke (GDR)	Ineke Ran (NED)
200 m butterfly	Anett Fiebig (GDR)	Andrea Pollack (GDR)	Susan Jenner (GBR)
200 m individual medley	Ulrike Tauber (GDR)	Sabine Kahle (GDR)	Olga Klevakina (URS)
400 m individual medley	Ulrike Tauber (GDR)	Sabine Kahle (GDR)	Sharron Davies (GBR)
4 × 100 m freestyle relay	East Germany; Birgit Treiber; Birgit Wächtler; Petra Priemer; Barbara Krause	Netherlands; Ineke Ran; Anja van de Bogaerde; Annelies Maas; Enith Brigitha	Great Britain; Victoria Bullock; Mary Houston; Sharron Davies; Cheryl Brazendale
4 × 100 m medley relay	East Germany; Ulrike Richter; Carola Nitschke; Andrea Pollack; Barbara Krause	Soviet Union; Kaire Indrikson; Yuliya Bogdanova; Olga Klevakina; Larisa Tsaryova	West Germany; Heike John; Dagmar Rehak; Karin Seick; Jutta Meeuw

== Diving ==
=== Men's events ===
Event	Gold	Silver	Bronze
3 m springboard	Falk Hoffmann (GDR)	Franco Cagnotto (ITA)	Aleksandr Kosenkov (URS)
10 m platform	Vladimir Aleynik (URS)	David Ambartsumyan (URS)	Falk Hoffmann (GDR)

=== Women's events ===
Event	Gold	Silver	Bronze
3 m springboard	Christa Köhler (GDR)	Beate Rothe (GDR)	Irina Kalinina (URS)
10 m platform	Margit Schöpke (GDR)	Elena Vaytsekhovskaya (URS)	Irina Kalinina (URS)

== Synchronized swimming ==
Event	Gold	Silver	Bronze
Solo	Jackie Cox (GBR)	Marijke Engelen (NED)	Renate Baur (SUI)
Duet	Jackie Cox (GBR); Andrea Holland (GBR)	Helma Giuvers (NED); Marijke Engelen (NED)	Renate Baur (SUI); Liselotte Meyer (SUI)
Team competition	Netherlands (NED)	Great Britain (GBR)	Switzerland (SUI)

== Water polo ==
Event	Gold	Silver	Bronze
Team competition	Hungary	Yugoslavia	Italy
