= José Damen =

Dutch swimmer (born 1959)

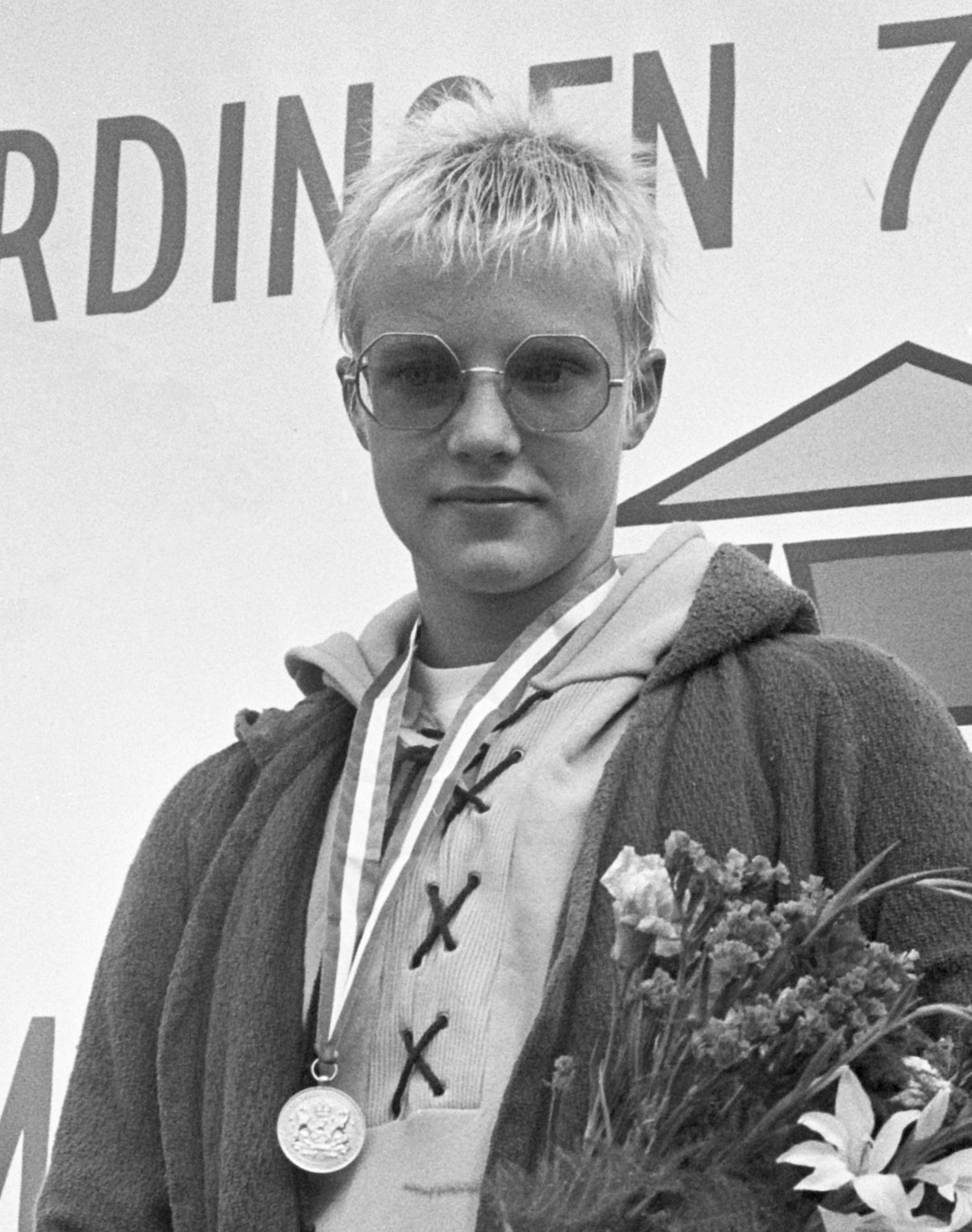
- Jose Damen in 1973

Medal record

Women's Swimming

Representing the Netherlands

World Championships (LC)
Bronze medal – third place	1975 Cali	4×100 m medley

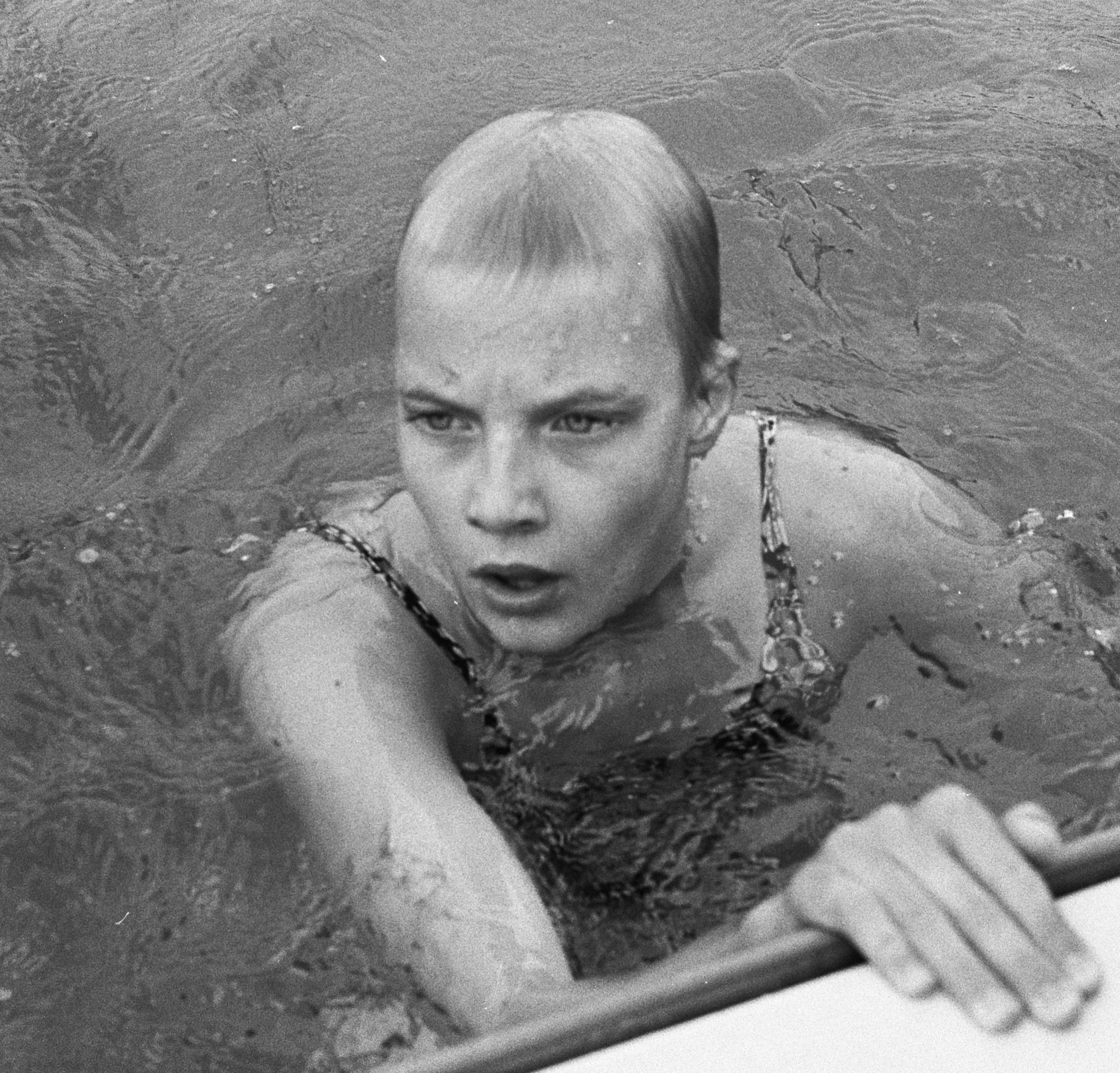
José Damen in 1973

Josina Regina Adriana Antonia Maria "José" Damen (born 12 November 1959 in 's-Hertogenbosch, North Brabant) is a former butterfly swimmer from the Netherlands, who competed for her native country at the 1976 Summer Olympics in Montreal, Quebec, Canada. She was eliminated in the preliminaries for 100m and 200m butterfly. With the Dutch relay team, Damen ended up in fifth place in the 4 × 100 m medley relay, alongside Wijda Mazereeuw (breaststroke), Diane Edelijn (backstroke), Enith Brigitha (freestyle) and Ineke Ran (freestyle preliminaries). Damen was also part of the Dutch medley team at the 1975 World Aquatics Championships in Cali and won a bronze medal.
