= Andrea Hübner =

East German swimmer (born 1957)

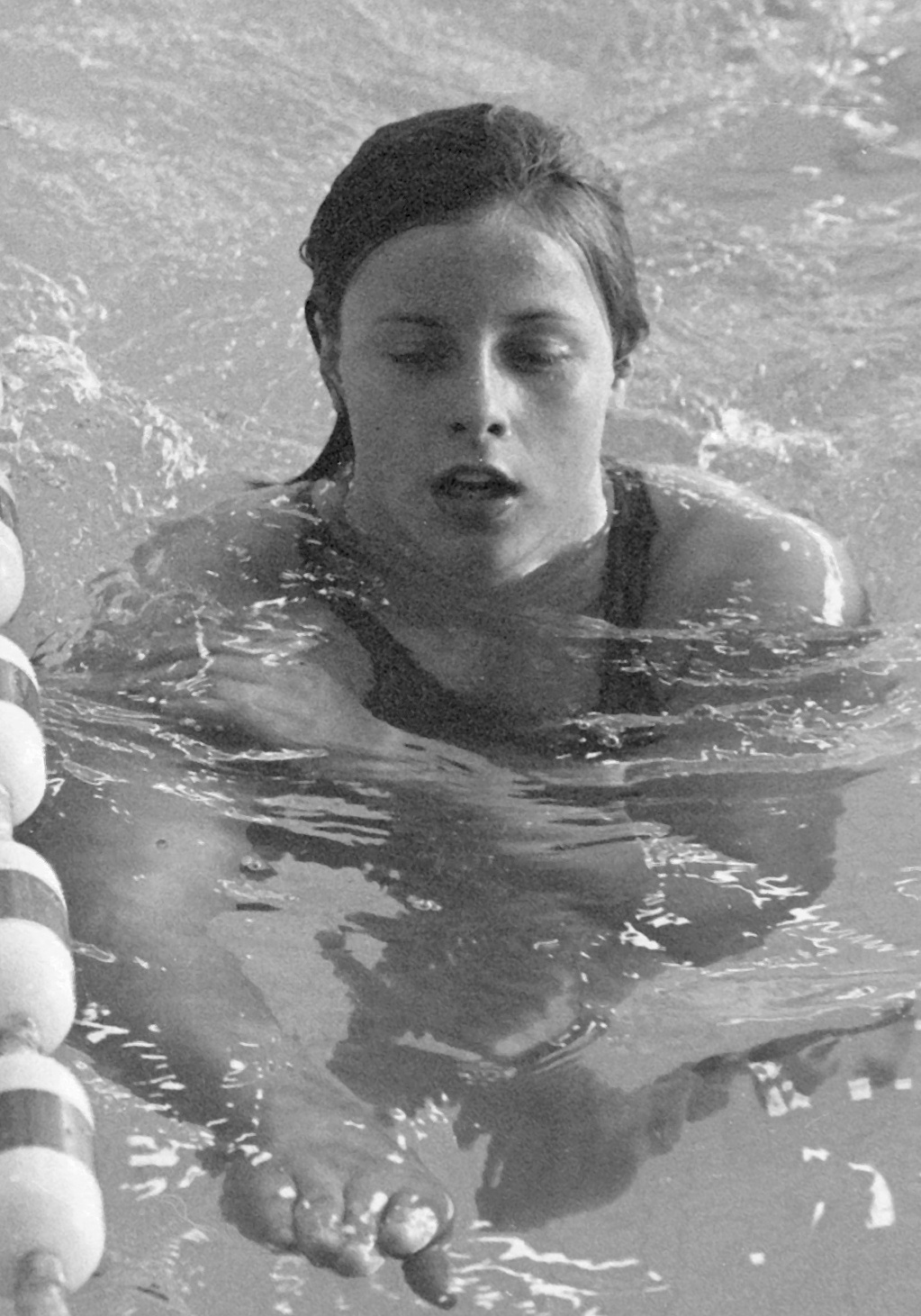
- Andrea Hübner in 1973

Medal record

Women's swimming

Representing East Germany

World Championships
Gold medal – first place	1973 Belgrade	200 m medley
Gold medal – first place	1973 Belgrade	4×100 m freestyle

European Championships
Gold medal – first place	1974 Vienna	4×100 m freestyle
Silver medal – second place	1974 Vienna	200 m medley

Andrea Hübner (later Ehrlich, born 17 February 1957 in Karl-Marx-Stadt) is a retired German swimmer who won two gold medals at the 1973 World Aquatics Championships, breaking world records in the 200 m medley and 4 × 100 m freestyle relay events. She also won a gold and a silver medal at the 1974 European Aquatics Championships. She is a sister of the former professional track cyclist Michael Hübner.
