= Claudio Zei =

Italian swimmer (born 1954)

Personal information
- Nationality: Italy
- Born: 1954 (age 71–72) Florence, Italy

Sport
- Sport: Swimming
- Strokes: Freestyle
- Club: A.S. Sergio De Gregorio
Medal record
World Championships (LC)
Bronze medal – third place	Cali 1975	4×100 freestyle
Mediterranean Games
Gold medal – first place	Algiers 1975	4×100 m freestyle
Gold medal – first place	Algiers 1975	4×200 m freestyle

Claudio Zei (born 1954) is an Italian former swimmer. He won bronze medal in 4x100 metres freestyle at the 1975 World Aquatics Championships. He was born in Florence.

== Achievements ==
Year	Competition	Venue	Position	Event	Performance	Notes
2012	World Championships (LC)	(Colombia) Cali	3rd	4 × 100 m Freestyle	3'31"85	
