= Anne-Katrin Schott =

German swimmer

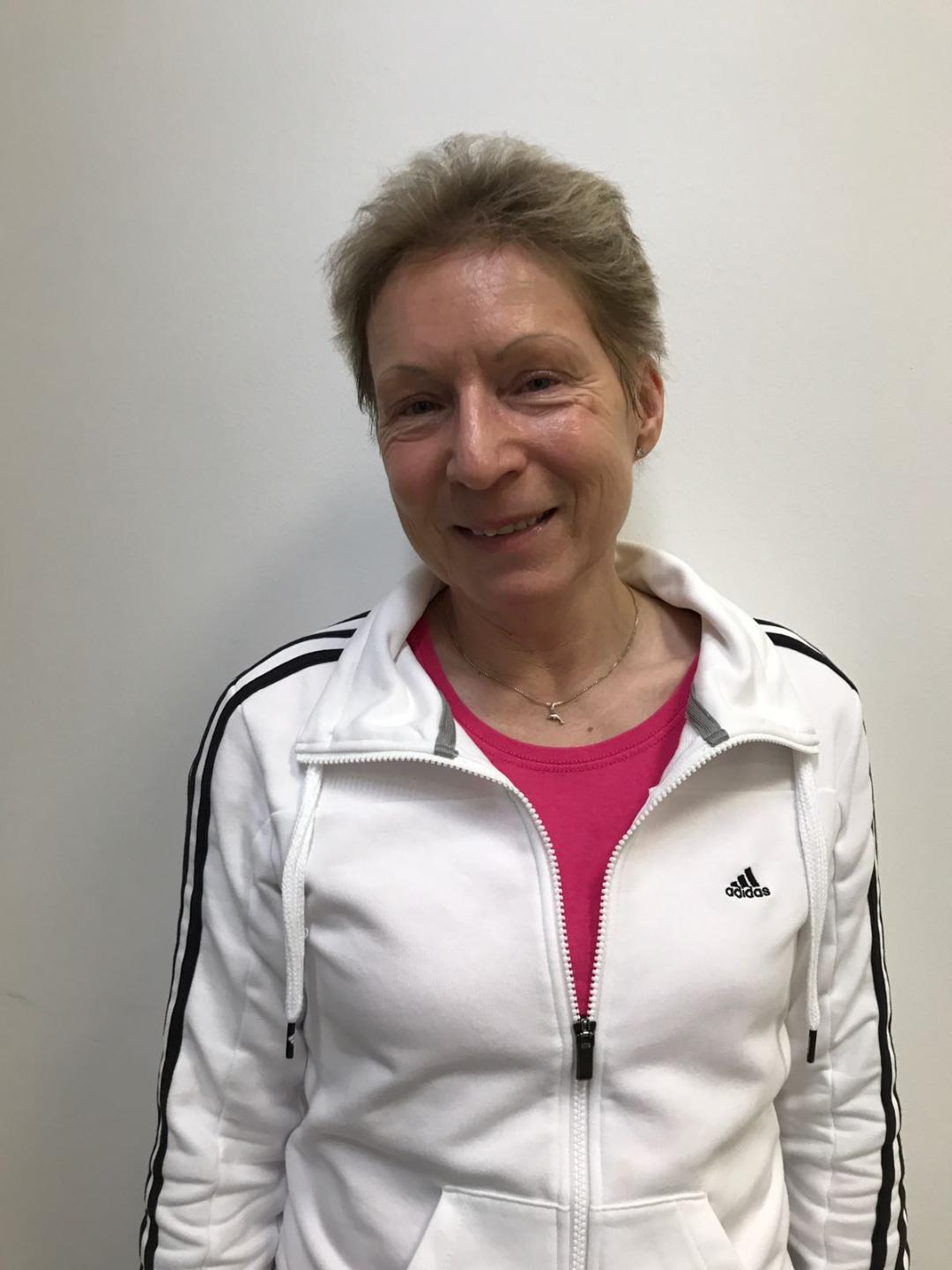
- Schott in 2018

Personal information
- Born: 21 December 1959 (age 66)

Sport
- Sport: Swimming
- Club: SC DHfK Leipzig
Medal record
Swimming
Representing East Germany
European Championships
Silver medal – second place	1974 Vienna	200 m breaststroke

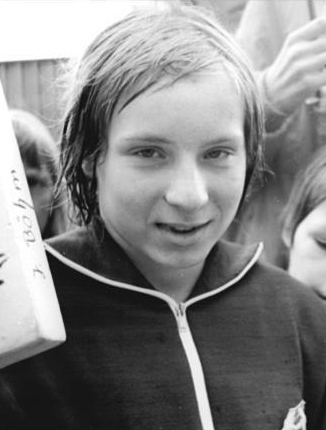
Anne-Katrin Schott, 1974

Anne-Katrin Schott (born 21 December 1959) is a retired German swimmer. In 1974, aged 14, she set a world record and weeks later won a silver medal in the 200 m breaststroke at the 1974 European Aquatics Championships. Between 1974 and 1975 she won three national titles in the 200 m breaststroke and 4 × 100 m medley relay events.
