= Christel Justen =

German swimmer

Personal information
- Born: 10 October 1957 Oosterhout, the Netherlands
- Died: 20 January 2005 (aged 47) Waldenburg, Baden-Württemberg, Germany

Sport
- Sport: Swimming
Medal record
Swimming
Representing West Germany
European Championships
Gold medal – first place	1974 Vienna	100 m breaststroke
Silver medal – second place	1974 Vienna	4×100 m medley

Christel Justen (German pronunciation: [ˈkʁɪstl̩ ˈjʊstn̩]; 10 October 1957 – 20 January 2005) was a German breaststroke swimmer who won one gold and one silver medal at the 1974 European Aquatics Championships. The same year she set a new world record in the 100 m breastroke event and was selected as the German Sportspersonality of the Year.

She retired soon after 1974 to focus on her studies and later worked as a sports coach and physiotherapist. It was later revealed in 1993 that as a teenager she was given anabolic steroids by her coach without knowledge or consent of her parents. She died of natural causes, aged 47.
