= 1974 European Aquatics Championships =

Water sport competitions

13th European Aquatics Championships
- Host city: Vienna
- Country: Austria
- Events: 37
- Opening: 18 August 1974
- Closing: 25 August 1974

The 1974 European Aquatics Championships were held in Austrian capital of Vienna from 18 to 25 August 1974. Besides swimming there were titles contested in diving, synchronised swimming (women) and water polo (men).

== Medal table ==
Rank	Nation	Gold	Silver	Bronze	Total
1	East Germany	17	15	4	36
2	West Germany	6	5	4	15
3	Great Britain	5	3	3	11
4	Hungary	3	1	4	8
5	Soviet Union	2	7	11	20
6	Italy	2	2	1	5
7	Sweden	2	1	3	6
8	Netherlands	0	3	5	8
9	France	0	0	1	1
9	Yugoslavia	0	0	1	1
Totals (10 entries)		37	37	37	111

== Medal summary ==
=== Diving ===
Men's events

Event	Gold		Silver		Bronze	
3 m springboard	Klaus Dibiasi (ITA)	603.51	Franco Cagnotto (ITA)	593.94	Vyacheslav Strakhov (URS)	583.71
10 m platform	Klaus Dibiasi (ITA)	562.83	Falk Hoffmann (GDR)	557.28	Aleksandr Gendrikson (URS)	522.51

Women's events

Event	Gold		Silver		Bronze	
3 m springboard	Ulrika Knape (SWE)	465.57	Irina Kalinina (URS)	460.17	Tamara Safonova (URS)	455.34
10 m platform	Ulrika Knape (SWE)	408.87	Irina Kalinina (URS)	399.54	Elena Vaytsekhovskaya (URS)	366.12

=== Swimming ===
==== Men's events ====
Event	Gold		Silver		Bronze	
100 m freestyle	Peter Nocke (FRG)	52.18	Vladimir Bure (URS)	52.19	Klaus Steinbach (FRG)	52.31
200 m freestyle	Peter Nocke (FRG)	1:53.10	Klaus Steinbach (FRG)	1:53.72	Aleksandr Samsonov (URS)	1:53.74
400 m freestyle	Aleksandr Samsonov (URS)	4:02.11	Bengt Gingsjö (SWE)	4:03.79	Andrey Krylov (URS)	4:04.32
1500 m freestyle	Frank Pfütze (GDR)	15:54.57	James Carter (GBR)	15:54.78	Igor Yevgrafov (URS)	16:04.42
100 m backstroke	Roland Matthes (GDR)	58.21	Lutz Wanja (GDR)	58.66	Zoltán Verrasztó (HUN)	58.78
200 m backstroke	Roland Matthes (GDR)	2:04.64	Zoltán Verrasztó (HUN)	2:04.96	Robert Rudolf (HUN)	2:07.52
100 m breaststroke	Nikolay Pankin (URS)	1:05.63	Walter Kusch (FRG)	1:06.04	David Leigh (GBR)	1:06.17
200 m breaststroke	David Wilkie (GBR)	2:20.42	Nikolay Pankin (URS)	2:22.84	David Leigh (GBR)	2:23.79
100 m butterfly	Roger Pyttel (GDR)	55.90	Roland Matthes (GDR)	56.68	Folkert Meeuw (FRG)	57.60
200 m butterfly	András Hargitay (HUN)	2:03.80	Brian Brinkley (GBR)	2:04.13	Hartmut Flöckner (GDR)	2:04.55
200 m individual medley	David Wilkie (GBR)	2:06.32; WR	Christian Lietzmann (GDR)	2:07.61	András Hargitay (HUN)	2:09.08
400 m individual medley	András Hargitay (HUN)	4:28.89; WR	Christian Lietzmann (GDR)	4:30.32	Andrey Smirnov (URS)	4:32.48
4 × 100 m freestyle relay	West Germany; Klaus Steinbach; Gerhard Schiller; Kersten Meier; Peter Nocke	3:30.61	Soviet Union; Vladimir Bure; Aleksandr Samsonov; Anatoly Rybakov; Georgiy Kulikov	3:32.01	East Germany; Roger Pyttel; Roland Matthes; Wilfried Hartung; Lutz Wanja	3:32.54
4 × 200 m freestyle relay	West Germany; Klaus Steinbach; Werner Lampe; Folkert Meeuw; Peter Nocke	7:39.70	Soviet Union; Aleksandr Samsonov; Andrey Krylov; Viktor Aboymov; Georgiy Kulikov	7:42.06	Sweden; Bernt Zarnowiecki; Anders Bellbring; Peter Pettersson; Bengt Gingsjö	7:43.10
4 × 100 m medley relay	West Germany; Klaus Steinbach; Walter Kusch; Folkert Meeuw; Peter Nocke	3:51.57	Great Britain; Colin Cunningham; David Wilkie; Stephen Nash; Brian Brinkley	3:54.13	Soviet Union; Igor Potyakin; Nikolay Pankin; Viktor Sharygin; Vladimir Bure	3:54.37

==== Women's events ====
Event	Gold		Silver		Bronze	
100 m freestyle	Kornelia Ender (GDR)	56.96; WR	Angela Franke (GDR)	57.82	Enith Brigitha (NED)	58.10
200 m freestyle	Kornelia Ender (GDR)	2:03.22; WR	Enith Brigitha (NED)	2:03.73	Andrea Eife (GDR)	2:05.04
400 m freestyle	Angela Franke (GDR)	4:17.83	Cornelia Dörr (GDR)	4:19.72	Novella Calligaris (ITA)	4:22.92
800 m freestyle	Cornelia Dörr (GDR)	8:52.45	Novella Calligaris (ITA)	8:57.93	Gudrun Wegner (GDR)	8:59.79
100 m backstroke	Ulrike Richter (GDR)	1:03.30; WR	Ulrike Tauber (GDR)	1:05.07	Enith Brigitha (NED)	1:05.94
200 m backstroke	Ulrike Richter (GDR)	2:17.35; WR	Ulrike Tauber (GDR)	2:18.72	Enith Brigitha (NED)	2:21.33
100 m breaststroke	Christel Justen (FRG)	1:12.55; WR	Renate Vogel (GDR)	1:13.69	Ágnes Kaczander (HUN)	1:14.95
200 m breaststroke	Karla Linke (GDR)	2:34.99; WR	Anne-Katrin Schott (GDR)	2:38.88	Marina Yurchenya (URS)	2:42.04
100 m butterfly	Rosemarie Kother (GDR)	1:01.99; WR	Anne-Katrin Leucht (GDR)	1:03.63	Gunilla Andersson (SWE)	1:04.67
200 m butterfly	Rosemarie Kother (GDR)	2:14.45	Anne-Katrin Leucht (GDR)	2:18.45	Barbara Schwarzfeldt (FRG)	2:19.71
200 m individual medley	Ulrike Tauber (GDR)	2:18.97; WR	Andrea Hübner (GDR)	2:23.97	Irina Fetisova (URS)	2:25.40
400 m individual medley	Ulrike Tauber (GDR)	4:52.42; WR	Gudrun Wegner (GDR)	4:58.78	Susan Richardson (GBR)	5:06.71
4 × 100 m freestyle relay	East Germany; Kornelia Ender; Angela Franke; Andrea Eife; Andrea Hübner	3:52.48	Netherlands; Anke Rijnders; Ada Pors; Veronica Stel; Enith Brigitha	3:57.08	France; Claude Mandonnaud; Sylvie Le Noach; Chantal Schertz; Guylaine Berger	3:57.61
4 × 100 m medley relay	East Germany; Ulrike Richter; Renate Vogel; Rosemarie Kother; Kornelia Ender	4:13.78; WR	West Germany; Angelika Grieser; Christel Justen; Beate Jasch; Jutta Weber	4:23.50	Sweden; Gunilla Lundberg; Jeanette Pettersson; Gunilla Andersson; Diana Olsson	4:23.90

=== Synchronised swimming ===
Event	Gold		Silver		Bronze	
Solo	Jane Holland (GBR)	93.820	Angelika Honsbeek (NED)	82.040	Brigitte Serwonski (FRG)	79.320
Duet	Great Britain; Jane Holland; Jennifer Lane	89.050	West Germany; Beate Mäckle; Brigitte Serwonski	82.415	Netherlands; Helma Giuvers; Angelika Honsbeek	78.010
Team	Great Britain	88.490	West Germany	85.293	Netherlands	78.859

=== Water polo ===
Event	Gold	Silver	Bronze
Men's competition	Hungary	Soviet Union	Yugoslavia

== See also ==
- List of European Championships records in swimming
