= Lutz Wanja =

East German swimmer

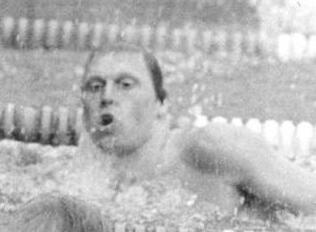
- Wanja in 1977

Personal information
- Born: 6 June 1956 Brandenburg an der Havel, East Germany
- Height: 1.83 m (6 ft 0 in)
- Weight: 73 kg (161 lb)

Sport
- Sport: Swimming
- Club: ASK Vorwärts Rostock
Medal record
Men's swimming
Representing East Germany
World Championships
Bronze medal – third place	1973 Belgrade	100 m backstroke
European Championships
Silver medal – second place	1974 Vienna	100 m backstroke
Silver medal – second place	1977 Jönköping	4×100 m medley
Bronze medal – third place	1974 Vienna	4×100 m freestyle

Lutz Wanja (born 6 June 1956) is a retired German backstroke swimmer who won a bronze medal at the 1973 World Aquatics Championships. He also won three medals at LEN European Aquatics Championships in 1974 and 1977. He competed at the 1972 and 1976 Summer Olympics in the 100 m and 200 m backstroke with the best achievement of fifth place in the 100 m backstroke in 1976.

After retirement, Wanja worked as a swimming coach and was involved in the East German doping program. In particular, Jörg Hoffmann admitted in 1988 that Wanja gave him the anabolic steroid Oral-Turinabol.

His wife, Barbara Krause, is a German former Olympic swimmer. Their son, Robert Wanja (born ca. 1983), is also a competitive backstroke swimmer.
