= Barbara Schwarzfeldt =

German former swimmer (born 1957)

Personal information
- Born: 8 May 1957 (age 69) Krefeld, Germany
- Height: 1.67 m (5 ft 6 in)
- Weight: 60 kg (130 lb)

Sport
- Sport: Swimming
- Club: SVW 05, Würzburg
Medal record
Women's swimming
Representing West Germany
European Championships
Bronze medal – third place	1974 Vienna	200 m butterfly

Barbara Schwarzfeldt (born 8 May 1957) is a German former swimmer who won a bronze medal in the 200 m butterfly at the 1974 European Aquatics Championships. She competed at the 1972 Summer Olympics in a very different event, 800 m freestyle, and was eliminated in the preliminaries.

Nationally, she won five titles: in the 200 m (1974) and 400 m (1976) freestyle, 200 m butterfly (1974, 1975) and 400 m medley (1976).
