= Rod Strachan =

American swimmer

Rodney “Rod” Strachan
- Strachan in 1976

Personal information
- Full name: Rodney Strachan
- Nickname: "Rod"
- National team: United States
- Born: October 16, 1955 (age 70) Santa Monica, California, U.S.
- Height: 6 ft 0 in (1.83 m)
- Weight: 170 lb (77 kg)

Sport
- Sport: Swimming
- Strokes: Individual medley
- Club: Anaheim Aquatics and Fullerton Area Swim Team (FAST)
- College team: University of Southern California
- Coach: Tom DeLong (Foothill High); Peter Daland (USC)
Medal record
Men's swimming
Representing the United States
Olympic Games
Gold medal – first place	1976 Montreal	400 m medley
World Championships (LC)
Silver medal – second place	1973 Belgrade	400 m medley

Rodney Strachan (born October 16, 1955) is an American former high school and college competition swimmer, 1976 Olympic gold medalist, and physician with a specialization in internal medicine.

Starting at the age of eight, Rod did age group training and competition with the Sammy Lee Swim School on Anaheim's Lincoln Avenue under Swimming Hall of Fame Coach John Urbanchek who swam for and later coached the University of Michigan. When the Sammy Lee Club disbanded in 1967, Rod swam for Anaheim Aquatics under Urbanchek until he left for USC, while swimming additional high school swim practices. He returned to Anaheim Aquatics, after graduating USC, until he retired from swimming. Eventually the Anaheim Club became the Fullerton Anaheim Swim Club, still coached by Urbancheck, and Strachan continued swimming with the club shortly after Olympic trials in June 1976, where he excelled. The club is now known as the Fullerton Aquatics Sports Team.

== High School swimming ==
Strachan was a standout swimmer and 1973 graduate of Foothill High School in Tustin, California, where he helped his team win three consecutive California Interscholastic Federation Championships from 1971-1973. Ron's Foothill teams featured several championship swimmers that included future Olympic medalists Bruce and Steve Furniss who also swam with him at Anaheim Aquatics.

At the 1973 CIF Championship in his Senior year, Ron placed second in the 200 Individual Medley, and fifth in the 400 freestyle, helping Foothill High to win the meet. A dominant team, by April of '73, Foothill swimming had won 35 straight dual meets with opponents. In the summer of his Senior year, Ron won the 400-meter Individual Medley at Mission Viejo's L.A. Invitational in 4:44.81 against top international competition. His High School Coach Tom DeLong was one of winningest high school coaches in the California Interscholastic Federation, amassing a record of 190-16-1, and winning 14 league championships, and 4 California Interscholastic Federation (State) titles from 1966-1984.

During his Senior Year, against a surprisingly strong field at the CIF Southern Section Relays in Long Beach in April '73, Strachan won as part of 4 man relay teams in butterfly and freestyle, but came in second in his signature IM relays, helping his Foothill Knights team to accumulate the points needed to win the competition in the finals.

== USC swimming ==
At USC, Strachan swam for Hall of Fame Coach Peter Daland. The Trojans won the NCAA Championship during Strachan's attendance from 1974-1977, and he won his signature medley event in 1976-1977 in record time.

As a college freshman at the NCAA championships in Long Beach in March 1974, he placed second in the 500-yard free, behind teammate and future Olympian John Naber, helping USC win the meet against rivals Tennessee and Indiana.

As a Sophomore at 19, at the 1975 NCAA Swimming Championships at Cleveland State, Strachan did well, but finished fourth in the 400-yard Individual Medley with a time of 3:59.05, out of title contention, though USC was well ahead of Indiana and won the Championship meet.

At 20 in the Spring of 1976 as a Junior at USC, he won the NCAA title at Brown University in the 400-meter Individual Medley, with a time of 4:29.15, breaking the standing American record by 1.41 seconds set by fellow USC and Foothill High swim teammate Steve Furniss. USC defeated Tennessee and all Division 1 competitors to take the championship.

At the NCAA Championships in Cleveland on March 25, 1977, as a USC Senior, Strachan won the 400-yard Individual Medley with an NCAA record time of 3:54.76, and though the time was under the existing American record, it was disallowed as the new American record because of a technicality. With a powerful team, that included Steve Furniss and John Naber, USC won the NCAA championship that year.

== 1976 Olympic Gold ==
As a USC Junior at the 1976 Olympic trials in June in Long Beach, he placed first in the 400-meter individual medley while Foothill High and USC swimming teammate Steve Furniss took third.

In the final competition in the 1976 Summer Olympics in Montreal, Quebec, in July, at the high point of his athletic career, he took the gold medal in the 400-meter individual medley event, while setting a new world record of 4:23.68. For two years, he retained the long course world record in the 400-meter individual medley (4:23.68) which he set in the Olympics from July 1976 to August 1978.

He received a silver medal in the same event at the 1973 World Aquatics Championships in Belgrade.

== Medical career ==
At USC, Strachan earned a 3.96 grade point average as a pre-med student. Strachan was offered a full scholarship to USC medical school and went on to become a successful anesthesiologist in Orange County.

== See also ==
- List of Olympic medalists in swimming (men)
- List of World Aquatics Championships medalists in swimming (men)
- World record progression 400 metres individual medley

Records
Preceded by Zoltán Verrasztó	Men's 400-meter individual medley world record-holder (long course); July 25, 1976 – August 4, 1978	Succeeded by Jesse Vassallo
