= Dov Nisman =

Israeli swimmer

Dov Nisman דב ניסמן
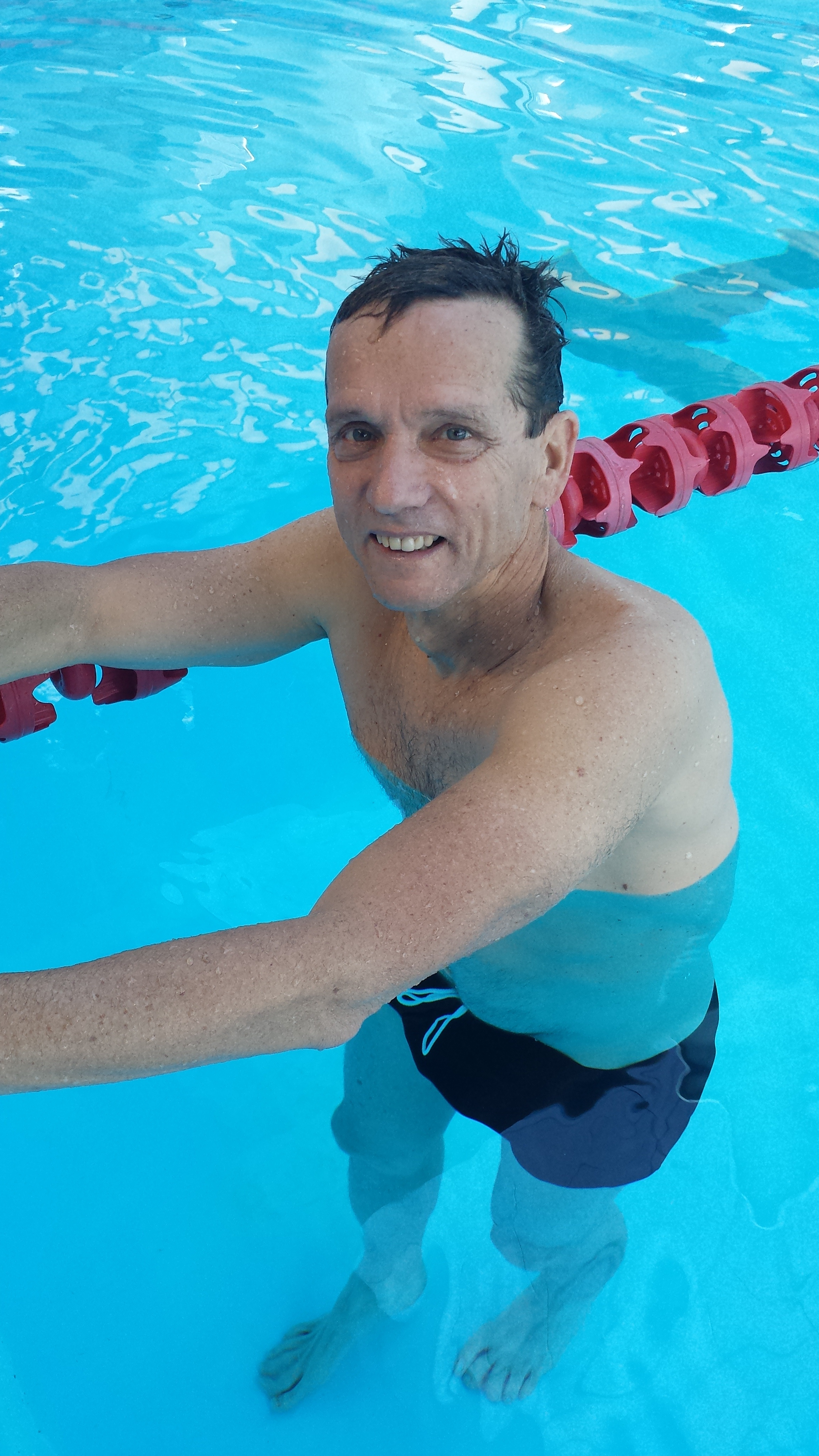
- Nisman in April, 2016

Personal information
- Nationality: Israeli
- Born: July 22, 1954 (age 71) Upper Galilee, Israel

Sport
- Sport: Swimming
- Events: 200 m butterfly 800 m freestyle 200 m and 400 m individual medley
- College team: Youngstown State University

Dov Nisman (Hebrew: דב ניסמן; born July 22, 1954) is an Israeli former Olympic swimmer who competed for Youngstown State University.

== Early life ==
Nisman was born in Israel on July 22, 1954, and is Jewish. He grew up on a kibbutz in the Upper Galilee in far Northern Israel. He later attended Youngstown State University. After his swimming career, he was the owner of Applied Laser Technologies, in Cleveland, Ohio, and was a resident of Beachwood, Ohio.

In 1975 in preparation for the 1976 Olympics, he was coached by Hall of fame Coach Ron Ballatore at Pasadena Junior College. Ballatore attended the 1976 Olympics in Montreal with Nisman, and also coached Israeli swimmer Adi Prag. By July 1976, Nisman's best time in the 400 Individual Medley had been 4:40, about 14 seconds over the standing world record.

== 1976 Montreal Olympics ==
Nisman competed for Israel at the 1976 Summer Olympics in Montreal, Quebec, Canada, at the age of 21. In the Men's 400 metre Individual Medley he came in 6th in Heat 4, making him 27th overall with a time of 4:47.13.

Swimming for Youngstown State in 1979 at the NCAA Men's Division II Swimming and Diving Championships, he came in 5th in the 200 yard butterfly event.

Representing Israel at the age of 61 in 2015 at the 16th FINA World Masters Championships in Kazan, Russia, he won gold medals in the 200-meter and 400-meter medley, and silver medals in the 200-meter butterfly and 800-meter freestyle. Nisman note in an interview he was “pleasantly surprised” and “very pleased” by his performance though he had trained diligently with in Israel for the meet.

== Later life ==
After he retired from elite swimming competition, Nisman moved back to Israel.
