= Igor Yevgrafov =

Soviet swimmer (1955–2023)

Personal information
- Born: 6 December 1955 Leningrad, Russian SFSR, USSR
- Died: 12 October 2023 (aged 67)

Sport
- Sport: Swimming
- Club: Soviet Army Club (SKA)
Medal record
Representing Soviet Union
European Championships
Bronze medal – third place	1974 Vienna	1500 m freestyle

Igor Vladimirovich Yevgrafov (Russian: Игорь Владимирович Евграфов; 6 December 1955 – 12 October 2023) was a Soviet swimmer who won a bronze medal in the 1500 m freestyle event at the 1974 European Aquatics Championships. He also won national titles in the same event in 1973 and 1975 and set a European record in the 800 m freestyle in 1975.

Yevgrafov died on 12 October 2023, at the age of 67.
