= Kathy Heddy =

American swimmer

Personal information
- Full name: Kathryn Jean Heddy
- Nickname: "Kathy"
- National team: United States
- Born: February 4, 1958 (age 68) Syracuse, New York, U.S.
- Height: 5 ft 6 in (1.68 m)
- Weight: 134 lb (61 kg)

Sport
- Sport: Swimming
- Strokes: Freestyle, Medley
- Club: Central Jersey Aquatic Club
Medal record
Women's swimming
Representing the United States
World Championships (LC)
Gold medal – first place	1975 Cali	200 m medley
Silver medal – second place	1973 Belgrade	4x100 m freestyle
Silver medal – second place	1975 Cali	4x100 m freestyle
Bronze medal – third place	1973 Belgrade	200 m medley
Bronze medal – third place	1975 Cali	400 m freestyle
Bronze medal – third place	1975 Cali	400 m medley
Pan American Games
Gold medal – first place	1975 Mexico City	400 m freestyle
Gold medal – first place	1975 Mexico City	200 m medley
Gold medal – first place	1975 Mexico City	400 m medley
Gold medal – first place	1975 Mexico City	4x100 m freestyle

Kathryn Jean Heddy (born February 4, 1958), also known by her married name Kathy Drum, is an American former competition swimming world champion and four-time Pan American champion.

Heddy grew up in Summit, New Jersey, where she graduated early from Summit High School in January 1976, allowing her to focus on her training rather than completing her studies in the Spring of that year. Some of her training was performed with the Central Jersey Aquatic Club under Coach Bill Palmer.

Heddy represented the United States at the 1973 World Championships in Belgrade, Yugoslavia. On September 4, she won the bronze medal in the 200-metre individual medley. On September 8, Heddy was part of the silver medal-winning 4 × 100 m freestyle relay team. On September 9, she finished 7th in the 100 m freestyle.

Heddy competed in the 1975 World Championships in Cali, Colombia. On July 22, she won the gold medal in the 200 m medley with a championship record time, 2:19.80, defeating the East German swimmers, Ulrike Tauber and Angela Franke. On July 24–25, Heddy won bronze medals in the 400 m medley and 400 m freestyle respectively. On July 26, she was part of the silver medal-winning 4 × 100 m freestyle relay team. The American team had taken the world record from the east Germans the previous year and swam 1.25 seconds below that mark in the final, but still lost to the east Germans who took back the world record and won the gold. On July 27, Heddy finished fourth in the 100 m freestyle, 1/100 s from the bronze. She received four medals in total, when summing up her 1975 world championship.

Heddy also participated at the 1976 Summer Olympics in Montreal, Quebec, where she finished fifth in the 400-metre freestyle on July 20.

== See also ==
- List of World Aquatics Championships medalists in swimming (women)
- World record progression 4 × 100 metres freestyle relay
