= Dagmar Rehak =

German swimmer

Personal information
- Born: 16 January 1956 (age 70) Heidenheim an der Brenz, Germany
- Height: 1.67 m (5 ft 6 in)
- Weight: 59 kg (130 lb)

Sport
- Sport: Swimming
- Club: DSV-Schule Max Ritter, Saarbrücken
Medal record
Women's swimming
Representing West Germany
European Championships
| Bronze medal – third place | 1977 Jönköping | 4×100 m medley |

Dagmar Rehak (born 16 January 1956) is a retired German breaststroke swimmer who won a bronze medal at the 1977 European Aquatics Championships. She competed at the 1976 Summer Olympics in the 100 m and 200 m breaststroke and 4 × 100 m medley relay events but did not reach the finals. During her career she won six national titles in the 100 m (1974, 1977, 1980) and 200 m (1974, 1975, 1978) breaststroke. She missed the 1980 Summer Olympics because of their boycott by West Germany.
