= Anne-Katrin Leucht =

German swimmer

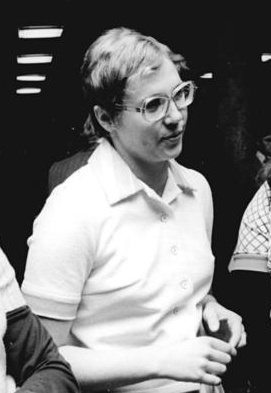
- Leucht in 1974

Sport
- Sport: Swimming
- Club: SC DHfK Leipzig
Medal record
Swimming
Representing East Germany
European Championships
Silver medal – second place	1974 Vienna	100 m butterfly
Silver medal – second place	1974 Vienna	200 m butterfly

Anne-Katrin Leucht is a retired German butterfly swimmer who won two silver medals at the 1974 European Aquatics Championships.
