= Gregory Jagenburg =

American swimmer (born c.1957)

- Jagenburg in 1971 winning the butterfly event at the Swim Director's Society age-group meet in Philadelphia at age 15

Personal information
- Full name: Gregory Jagenburg
- Nickname: "Greg"
- National team: United States
- Born: May 1, 1956
- Height: 6 ft (183 cm)
- Weight: 200 lb (91 kg)

Sport
- Sport: Swimming
- Strokes: Butterfly
- Club: Foxcatcher Swim Club; Newton Square, PA
- College team: California State–Long Beach; University of Arizona
- Coach: Frank Keefe (Suburban Swim Club); Dick Jochums (Long Beach State) (U. of Arizona)
Medal record
Men's swimming
Representing the United States
World Championships – Long course
Gold medal – first place	1975 Cali	100 m butterfly
Gold medal – first place	1975 Cali	4×100 m medley
Silver medal – second place	1978 West Berlin	100 m butterfly
Pan American Games
Gold medal – first place	1975 Mexico City	200 m butterfly
Silver medal – second place	1975 Mexico City	100 m butterfly

Gregory "Greg" Jagenburg (born c. 1957) is an American former competition swimmer and a World Aquatics Champion in butterfly who swam for Long Beach State and the University of Arizona under Hall of Fame Coach Dick Jochums. In August 1975, Jagenburg swam a 2:00.73 in the 200-meter butterfly, just .03 seconds behind Mark Spitz's standing world record in the 1972 Munich Olympic Games.

By the age of 14, Jagenburg was swimming and competing in swimming in the New York area, winning the freestyle and butterfly events in an AAU age-group meet sponsored by the Yonkers Aquatic Council.

== High School swimming ==
Around 1971-2 in his Sophomore year in High School, Jagenburg moved from New York State to swim for Philadelphia's Malvern Preparatory School, under Coach Paul Hornsletch to participate in its exceptional swim program, and benefit from its quality academics. While there, he won the 1974 Outstanding Swimmer Award, and was in line to win the award the following year. Tim McKee, a 1972 swimming Olympic silver medalist, had just graduated Malvern when Jagenburg was a Sophomore, and Tim's brother Chris, a High School All American freestyler swam with Jagenburg at Malvern, and at Suburban Swim Club. Rounding out an exceptional team, Steve McDonald was another All-American swimmer at Malvern when Jagenberg was a Sophomore.

=== National age-group record ===
While at Malvern in February, 1973, Jagenberg set a National Catholic Record for the 100-yard butterfly of 51.8, at the National Catholic Swimming Championships on February 18, 1973 at Villanova. Jagenburg would later lower the mark to a National age group record of 50.6 at the Westchester Classic while swimming for Philadelphia's Suburban Swim Club in December, 1974, while breaking meet records in the 100-yard backstroke, 100 and 200 yard freestyle, and 200 Individual Medley. While swimming for Philadelphia's Suburban Swim Club in the summer, he qualified in the 200 butterfly in the AAU National Championships in Concord, California in late August, 1974. As a Senior at Malvern Prep in mid-February 1975, Jagenburg, set a conference record in the 200-yard freestyle of 1:44.4, and set a national prep school record in the 100-yard butterfly of 50.5 in qualifying events for the Catholic Interscholastic Championships at Villanova University.

=== Foxcatcher club history ===
In Club swimming, Jagenburg swam for the Philadelphia area's Foxcatcher Swim Club by around 1977-78, in Newton Square, Pennsylvania especially during the summers, an outstanding program that had a number of coaches. Philadelphia's Suburban Swim Club program, where Jagenburg began swimming around 1971 in his Sophomore year at Malvern Prep, was started in 1950 by Hall of Fame Coach Peter Daland, with ASCA Hall of Fame Coach Frank Keefe taking over in 1966. Not long after Keefe took over, the team began training at John DuPont's 50-meter Foxcatcher Farm swimming pool. Around 1976, Keefe would start coaching the new swimming program at the Foxcatcher Swim Club, and Jagenburg would officially begin swimming with Foxcatcher in the summer of 1977 around his second year at Long Beach State. Jagenburg continued swimming with Foxcatcher when on summer breaks from his college swim teams. Keefe was a future Yale and U.S. Olympic Coach, and coached Jagenburg with the Suburban Swim Club with Assistant Coach Greg German from around 1971-1976. From 1978-1980, Foxcatcher's coaching would be performed by the exceptional Hall of Fame Coach George Haines when Keefe left in September 1978 to take a swim coaching position at Yale.

While swimming at Malvern Prep, Jagenburg was a multi-year winner of the 200-meter butterfly, at the Middle Atlantic AAU Swimming Championships, winning the 1978 Championship at Pennsylvania's State College with a 2:08.05, while also winning the 200-meter freestyle. From 1975-1978, Jagenburg won the Sackett Trophy four times for his achievements in Eastern competition swimming.

=== 1975 AAU Long Course Championships ===
Swimming for the Long Beach Swim Club in August 1975 at the AAU Long Course Championships in Kansas City, Jagenburg swam a winning 2:00.73 in the 200-meter butterfly, just .03 seconds behind Mark Spitz's record in the 1972 Olympic Games. The time established Jagenburg as one of the world's top butterfly swimmers, though he was disappointed to miss breaking Spitz's record. Three years later, around May, 1978, at the US-USSR dual meet in Austin, Texas, Jagenburg would become one of three swimmers to break Spitz's 1972 Olympic world record of 55.7 seconds in the 100-meter butterfly.

== International competition highlights ==
=== '75, '78 World Aquatics Championships ===
At the July 1975 World Aquatics Championships in Cali, Colombia, he won gold medals in the 100-meter butterfly and the 4×100-meter medley relay, as well achieving a fourth place in the 200-meter butterfly. At the August 1978 World Aquatics Championships in West Berlin, Germany, he placed second in the Men's 100-meter butterfly with a time of 55.25, less than a second behind American gold medalist Joe Bottom.

At the October 1975 Pan American Games in Mexico City, Jagenburg captured a gold in the 200-meter butterfly with a 2:03.42, and a silver in the 100-butterfly. The American swimmers overpowered the competition and set numerous records capturing a host of gold medals.

A case of mononucleosis three weeks before the start of the 1976 Olympic trials prevented Jagenburg from having a chance at the 1976 Montreal Olympics, where he would have been a contender in the 100-meter butterfly. Jagenburg reported he was swimming around 17,000 meters (Around 10.5 miles) a day in training for the trials and not getting sufficient rest or carefully watching his diet.

== College swimming ==
Jagenburg swam for Long Beach State and the University of Arizona under Hall of Fame Coach Dick Jochums. Swimming for Long Beach State, at the March 1978 NCAA championships in Los Angeles, Jagenburg won the 100 and 200-yard butterfly events, in one of his singularly most significant swimming achievements. At Long Beach State, near Los Angeles, he studied theatre arts and may have been influenced by his mother Ellen Dunlop who was an actress and singer on Broadway. At the March 1978 NCAA Championships in Long Beach, Jagenburg won the 100 butterfly with a time of 48.77 and the 200 butterfly with a time of 1:46.01.

As an upperclassman, Jagenburg transferred to the University of Arizona to swim with his former Long Beach State Coach Dick Jochums along with Long Beach State backstroke swimmers Olympian Tim Shaw and Bob Jackson, who lent considerable ability to a formerly struggling program that had recruited other top swimmers that year and anticipated a much better season. Jochums, realizing the strength of his team, set his goals on the NCAA championships and the Olympic trials rather than focusing exclusively on Dual Meets. Swimming for Arizona at the March 1980 NCAA Championships in Cambridge, Massachusetts, Jagenburg slipped to seventh place in the 100 butterfly with a 48.91 against stiffer competition who could shave seconds off his personal best times.

== See also ==
- List of World Aquatics Championships medalists in swimming (men)
