= Sabine Kahle =

German swimmer

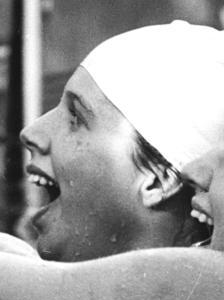
- Sabine Kahle in 1977

Medal record

Women's swimming

Representing East Germany

European Championships
Silver medal – second place	1977 Jönköping	200 m medley
Silver medal – second place	1977 Jönköping	400 m medley

Sabine Kahle (born 25 June 1959 in Meiningen) is a German retired swimmer who won two silver medals in medley events at the 1977 European Aquatics Championships. She also participated in the 1976 Summer Olympics and finished fifth in the 400 m medley and eighth in the 400 m freestyle.
