= Anatoly Rybakov (swimmer) =

Russian swimmer

Personal information
- Born: 30 January 1956 (age 70) Arzamas-16, Gorky Oblast, Russian SFSR, Soviet Union

Sport
- Sport: Swimming
- Club: Burevestnik
Medal record
Representing Soviet Union
World Championships
Bronze medal – third place	1975 Cali	4×200 m freestyle
European Championships
Silver medal – second place	1974 Vienna	4×100 m freestyle

Anatoly Rybakov (Russian: Анатолий Рыбаков; born 30 January 1956) is a Soviet swimmer who won a silver medal in the 4 × 100 m freestyle relay at the 1974 European Aquatics Championships and a bronze medal in the 4 × 200 m freestyle relay at the 1975 World Aquatics Championships. In 1975, he set European records in the 4 × 100 m and 4 × 200 m relays.
