= Karla Linke =

East German swimmer

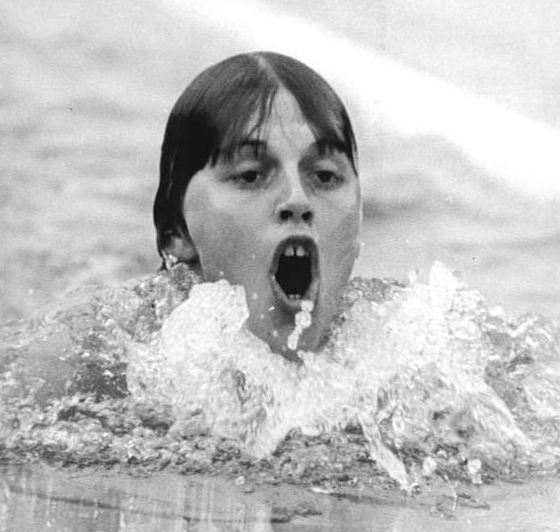

Personal information
- Born: 29 June 1960 (age 66) Dresden, East Germany
- Height: 1.80 m (5 ft 11 in)
- Weight: 74 kg (163 lb)

Sport
- Sport: Swimming
- Club: SC Einheit Dresden
Medal record
Women's swimming
Representing East Germany
World Championships
Silver medal – second place	1975 Cali	400 m medley
Bronze medal – third place	1975 Cali	200 m breaststroke
European Championships
Gold medal – first place	1974 Vienna	200 m breaststroke

Karla Linke (also Carla; Born 29 June 1960) is a retired German swimmer who won the 200 m breaststroke event at the 1974 European Aquatics Championships, breaking the world record twice in the process. The following year, she collected two medals at the 1975 World Aquatics Championships: a silver in the 400 m medley and a bronze in the 200 m breaststroke. She also competed at the 1976 Summer Olympics in the 100 m and 200 m breaststroke events and finished eighth and fifth, respectively.

After retiring from competitive swimming in 1977, Linke moved to Sweden and worked for the German-Swedish Chamber of Commerce in Dresden. As of May 2012 she was employed by the Swedish Embassy in Berlin.
