= Hannelore Anke =

East German swimmer

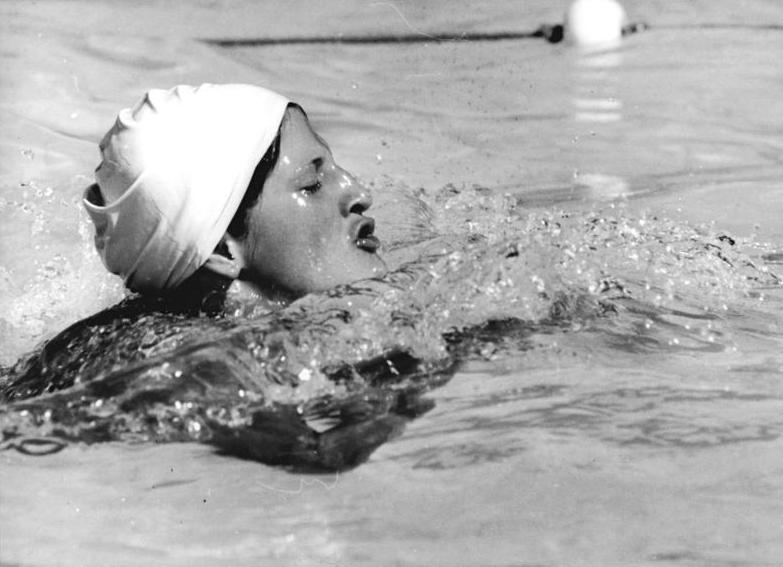
- Hannelore Anke in 1975

Personal information
- Nationality: East German
- Born: 8 December 1957 (age 68) Schlema, Bezirk Karl-Marx-Stadt, East Germany
- Height: 1.60 m (5 ft 3 in)
- Weight: 52 kg (115 lb)

Sport
- Sport: Swimming
- Strokes: Breaststroke
- Club: SC Karl-Marx-Stadt
Medal record
Representing East Germany
Olympic Games
Gold medal – first place	1976 Montreal	100 m breaststroke
Gold medal – first place	1976 Montreal	4×100 m medley
World Championships
Gold medal – first place	1975 Cali	100 m breaststroke
Gold medal – first place	1975 Cali	200 m breaststroke
Gold medal – first place	1975 Cali	4×100 medley
Silver medal – second place	1973 Belgrade	200 m breaststroke

Hannelore Anke (later Hofmann; born 8 December 1957) is a retired German swimmer who competed for East Germany in the 1970s.

== Personal life ==
Anke was born in 1957 in Bad Schlema. Her mother had a senior position in a textile manufacturing plant and her father was a decorative painter. The sixth of ultimately seven children, she was the first god-child of Wilhelm Pieck, who at the time of her birth was president of East Germany.

== Sports career ==
Anke became junior-champion at the 1971 Junior European Swimming Championships. She had her best achievements in the 100 m breaststroke and 4 × 100 m medley relay. In these two events she won gold medals at the 1976 Summer Olympics and 1975 World Aquatics Championships, and set two world records. In 1975, she also won a world title in the 100 m breaststroke. She was inducted into the International Swimming Hall of Fame in Fort Lauderdale, Florida in 1990.

== Doping ==
Officials from the East German team have later admitted that they administered performance-enhancing drugs to Anke during her career.

== See also ==
- List of members of the International Swimming Hall of Fame
