= James Carter (swimmer) =

Scottish swimmer (born 1957)

Personal information
- Full name: James Hill Carter
- Nicknames: "Jim", "Jimmy"
- National team: Great Britain
- Born: 12 February 1957 (age 69)
- Height: 1.78 m (5 ft 10 in)
- Weight: 68 kg (150 lb)

Sport
- Sport: Swimming
- Strokes: Backstroke, freestyle, medley
- Club: Ryde-Carlile Swimming Club
- College team: University of California, Berkeley (U.S.)
Medal record
Men's swimming
Representing Great Britain
World Championships
Bronze medal – third place	1975 Cali	4×100 m medley
European Championships
Silver medal – second place	1974 Vienna	1500 m freestyle
Bronze medal – third place	1977 Jönköping	4×100 m medley

James Hill Carter (born 12 February 1957) is a Scottish former competitive swimmer.

== Swimming career ==
James Carter represented Great Britain at the Olympics, FINA world championships and European championships, and Scotland at the Commonwealth Games, during the 1970s and early 1980s. Carter competed in backstroke and freestyle swimming events ranging from 100 metres to 1500 metres.

Carter qualified for three Olympics in 1972, 1976 and 1980; his best result was fourth place as a member of the British men's team in the 4×100-metre medley relay in 1976. As a British relay team member, he won bronze medals in the 4x100-metre medley relay at the 1975 World Aquatics Championships and 1977 European Aquatics Championships. He also won a silver medal in the 1500-metre freestyle at the 1974 European Aquatics Championships. At the ASA National British Championships he won the 1973 and 1974 1500 metres freestyle titles, the 200 metres backstroke titles in 1976 and 1977, the 200 metres medley title in 1976 and the 400 metres medley title in 1974.

Between 1977 and 1979 he studied at the University of California, Berkeley, and swam for the university's California Golden Bears swimming and diving team. Before that he was trained at the Ryde-Carlile Swimming Club, Putney, New South Wales, Australia.

== Personal life ==
As seen on the Food Network television programme Diners, Drive-Ins and Dives, Carter now owns a diner called Meal Ticket in Berkeley, California, together with his wife Carolyn Del Gaudio.
