= Andrey Smirnov (swimmer) =

Soviet swimmer (1957–2019)

Personal information
- Full name: Andrey Vladislavovich Smirnov
- National team: Soviet Union
- Born: 11 April 1957 Leningrad, Soviet Union
- Died: 16 October 2019 (aged 62)
- Height: 1.72 m (5 ft 8 in)
- Weight: 62 kg (137 lb)

Sport
- Sport: Swimming
- Strokes: Individual medley
- Club: Lokomotiv Leningrad
- Coach: Vladislav Mitrofanov
Medal record
Men's swimming
Representing the Soviet Union
Olympic Games
Bronze medal – third place	1976 Montreal	400 m medley
World Championships (LC)
Silver medal – second place	1975 Cali	400 m medley
Bronze medal – third place	1975 Cali	200 m medley
European Championships (LC)
Silver medal – second place	1977 Jönköping	200 m medley
Silver medal – second place	1977 Jönköping	400 m medley
Bronze medal – third place	1974 Vienna	400 m medley

Andrey Vladislavovich Smirnov (Russian: Андре́й Владисла́вович Смирно́в; 11 April 1957 – 16 October 2019) was a Soviet swimmer who competed in the 1976 Summer Olympics.
