= Aleksandr Samsonov =

Russian former swimmer (born 1953)

Personal information
- Born: 16 July 1953 (age 72) Moscow, Soviet Union
- Height: 1.87 m (6 ft 2 in)
- Weight: 80 kg (176 lb)

Sport
- Sport: Swimming
- Club: CSKA Moscow
Medal record
Representing the Soviet Union
Olympic Games
Bronze medal – third place	1972 Munich	4×200 m freestyle
World Championships
Bronze medal – third place	1975 Cali	4×200 m freestyle
European Championships
Gold medal – first place	1974 Vienna	400 m freestyle
Silver medal – second place	1970 Barcelona	4×200 m freestyle
Silver medal – second place	1974 Vienna	4×100 m freestyle
Silver medal – second place	1974 Vienna	4×200 m freestyle
Bronze medal – third place	1974 Vienna	200 m freestyle
Summer Universiade
Silver medal – second place	1973 Moscow	400 m freestyle

Aleksandr Vasilyevich Samsonov (Russian: Александр Васильевич Самсонов; born 16 July 1953) is a Russian former swimmer. He competed at the 1972 Summer Olympics in the 400 m, 1500 m and 4 × 200 m freestyle. He won a bronze medal in the relay, in which he swam for the Soviet team in the preliminary round, but failed to reach the finals in other events.

Between 1970 and 1975 he won six medals at European and world championships, including four medals at the 1974 European Aquatics Championships.
