= Tim Shaw (swimmer) =

American swimmer

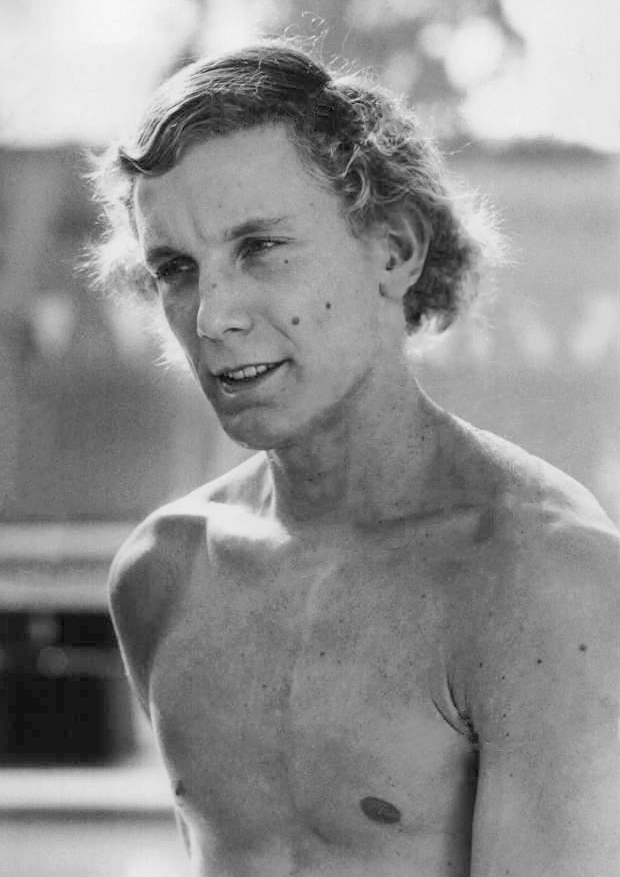
- Shaw in 1976

Personal information
- Full name: Timothy Andrew Shaw
- National team: United States
- Born: November 8, 1957 (age 68) Long Beach, California, U.S.
- Height: 6 ft 2 in (188 cm)
- Weight: 148 lb (67 kg)

Sport
- Sport: Swimming
- Strokes: Freestyle, water polo
- College team: California State University, Long Beach; University of Arizona
- Coach: Dick Jochums; College swimming coach
Medal record
Representing the United States
Men's swimming
Olympic Games
Silver medal – second place	1976 Montreal	400 m freestyle
World Championships
Gold medal – first place	1975 Cali	200 m freestyle
Gold medal – first place	1975 Cali	400 m freestyle
Gold medal – first place	1975 Cali	1500 m freestyle
Men's water polo
Olympic Games
Silver medal – second place	1984 Los Angeles	Team
Pan American Games
Gold medal – first place	1983 Caracas	Team

Timothy Andrew Shaw (born November 8, 1957) is an American former Olympic medal-winning swimmer and water polo player. He swam at the 1976 Summer Olympics and played on the American team at the 1984 Summer Olympics. He is one of a handful of athletes to win Olympic medals in two different sports. Between 1974 and 1984, Shaw won two Olympic silver medals; three world championships; seven U.S. Amateur Athletic Union national titles; and three U.S. National Collegiate Athletic Association championships.

In 1974 in space of four days Shaw broke Mark Spitz's 200-meter freestyle world record, Rick DeMont's 400-meter freestyle world record and Stephen Holland's 1500-meter freestyle world record. Shaw appeared on the cover of Sports Illustrated magazine on August 4, 1975, after receiving the FINA Prize Eminence Award in 1974, representative of the greatest contribution to world aquatics. He was named World Swimmer of the Year in 1974 and 1975, and won the Sullivan Award in 1975 as the most outstanding amateur athlete in the United States after having won three gold medals at the World Aquatics Championships. Aged only 17 years and 256 days old, he became the youngest world champion in 1975, when he won the men’s 200m freestyle.

At the 1976 Olympics he only won one silver medal, in the 400-meter freestyle; he was completely shut out of his signature event, the 1500-meter freestyle. Although he did not compete in the finals for the 4×200 metres freestyle relay, he did contribute to the swimming team in the preliminaries. After the 1976 Olympics Shaw continued competitive college swimming, but focused more on water polo for future Olympics. The sport was favored by his father, who was a water polo coach. Shaw missed the 1980 Olympics that were boycotted by the United States. He was a member of the 1984 U.S. water polo team that was undefeated in Olympic competition, but was awarded the silver medal because the Yugoslav team, with an identical record, scored four more goals overall.

Shaw attended and swam for Long Beach State outside Los Angeles, but as an upperclassman transferred to swim for the University of Arizona, following his Long Beach State swim coach Dick Jochums and exceptional Long Beach state swimming teammates Gregory Jagenburg, a World Aquatics Champion, and Bob Jackson.

In 1989 Shaw was inducted into the International Swimming Hall of Fame, and in 1991, he was inducted into the USA Water Polo Hall of Fame. He married around 1985, and as of 2003 he lives in Newport Beach, California, with wife Joanne, and children Christina, Jennifer, and Thomas.

== See also ==
- List of athletes with Olympic medals in different sports
- List of Olympic medalists in swimming (men)
- List of Olympic medalists in water polo (men)
- List of World Aquatics Championships medalists in swimming (men)
- World record progression 200 metres freestyle
- World record progression 400 metres freestyle
- World record progression 800 metres freestyle
- World record progression 1500 metres freestyle
- World record progression 4 × 200 metres freestyle relay
- List of members of the International Swimming Hall of Fame
- List of multi-sport athletes
