= Rosemarie Gabriel =

East German swimmer

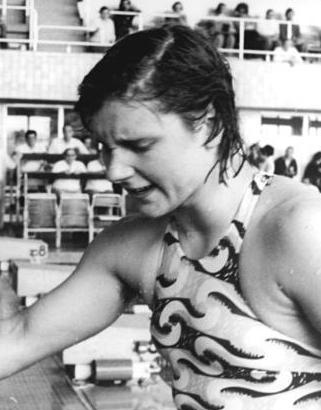
- Gabriel in 1976

Personal information
- Born: 27 February 1956 (age 70) Schwerin, East Germany
- Height: 1.60 m (5 ft 3 in)
- Weight: 50 kg (110 lb)

Sport
- Sport: Swimming
- Club: SC Dynamo Berlin
Medal record
Representing East Germany
Olympic Games
Gold medal – first place	1976 Montreal	4×100 m medley
Bronze medal – third place	1976 Montreal	200 m butterfly
World Championships
Gold medal – first place	1973 Belgrade	200 m butterfly
Gold medal – first place	1973 Belgrade	4×100 m medley
Gold medal – first place	1975 Cali	200 m butterfly
Gold medal – first place	1975 Cali	4×100 m medley
Silver medal – second place	1973 Belgrade	100 m butterfly
Silver medal – second place	1975 Cali	100 m butterfly
European Championships
Gold medal – first place	1974 Viena	100 m butterfly
Gold medal – first place	1974 Viena	200 m butterfly
Gold medal – first place	1974 Viena	4×100 m medley

Rosemarie Gabriel (née Kother; born 27 February 1956) is a retired German swimmer. She competed at the 1972 and 1976 Summer Olympics in five events in total and won a gold medal in the 4 × 100 m medley relay in 1976, swimming for the East German team in a preliminary round. Individually, she won a bronze medal in the 200 m butterfly in 1976.

Between 1973 and 1975 she won seven gold and two silver medals in the 100 m and 200 m butterfly and 4 × 100 m medley relay at the world and European championships. She also set eleven world records:

- three in the 100 m butterfly (1974),
- five in the 200 m butterfly (1973, 1976),
- two in the 4 × 100 m medley relay (1973, 1974) and
- one in the 4 × 100 m freestyle relay (1976).

In 1986, she was inducted to the International Swimming Hall of Fame.

After being inducted into the International Swimming Hall of Fame, team officials confessed to administering performance enhancing drugs to this swimmer, who therefore obtained an illegal and unfair advantage over other athletes.

She retired from competitions in 1976 and studied physiotherapy. In 1990 she founded her own company Praxis Gabriel in Berlin, which in 2000 was joined by her daughter Linda (born ca. 1981).

== See also ==
- List of members of the International Swimming Hall of Fame
