= Dirk Braunleder =

German swimmer

Personal information
- Born: 11 March 1957 (age 69) Aachen, West Germany
- Height: 1.91 m (6 ft 3 in)
- Weight: 74 kg (163 lb)

Sport
- Sport: Swimming
- Club: SSF Bonn 1905
Medal record
Representing West Germany
Olympic Games
Bronze medal – third place	1976 Montréal	4×100 m medley
World Championships
Silver medal – second place	1975 Cali	4×100 m freestyle

Dirk Braunleder (born 11 March 1957) is a German swimmer who won a bronze medal in the 4 × 100 m medley relay at the 1976 Summer Olympics. He also won a silver medal in the 4 × 100 m freestyle relay at the 1975 World Aquatics Championships.
