= Christian Lietzmann =

German swimmer

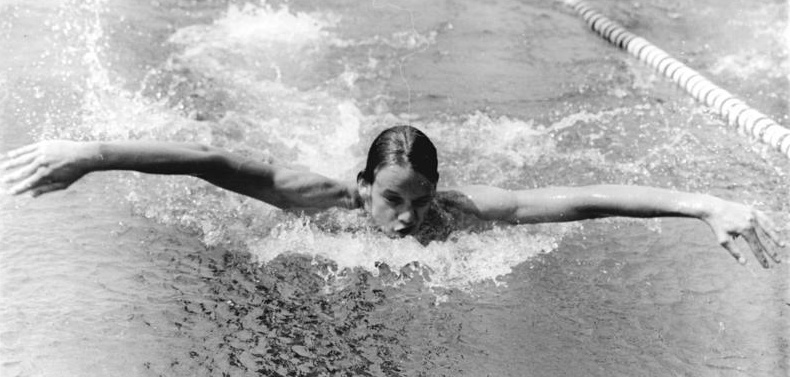
- Lietzmann in 1974

Personal information
- Born: October 2, 1955 Görlitz, East Germany
- Died: September 2006 (aged 50)
- Height: 1.89 m (6 ft 2 in)
- Weight: 74 kg (163 lb)

Sport
- Sport: Swimming
- Club: SC Einheit Dresden
Medal record
Men's swimming
Representing East Germany
European Championships
| Silver medal – second place | 1974 Vienna | 200 m medley |
| Silver medal – second place | 1974 Vienna | 400 m medley |

Christian Lietzmann (2 October 1955 – September 2006) was a German swimmer who won two silver medals at the 1974 European Aquatics Championships, in the 200 m and 400 m medley, competing for East Germany. He competed in the same events at the 1972 Summer Olympics, but was eliminated in the preliminaries.
