= Kersten Meier =

German swimmer

Personal information
- Born: 23 February 1954 Celle, West Germany
- Died: 3 April 2001 (aged 47) Düsseldorf, Germany

Sport
- Sport: Swimming
Medal record
Representing West Germany
World Championships
Silver medal – second place	1975 Cali	4x100m freestyle relay
Silver medal – second place	1978 West Berlin	4x100m freestyle relay
European Championships
Gold medal – first place	1974 Vienna	4x100m freestyle relay

Kersten Meier (23 February 1954 – 3 April 2001) was a German swimmer who competed in the 1972 Summer Olympics.

He died on 3 April 2001 in Düsseldorf. The cause of death was suicide.
