= 1975 World Aquatics Championships =

2nd FINA World Championships
- Host city: Cali, Colombia
- Date(s): July 19–27, 1975
- Nations participating: 39
- Athletes participating: 682

The 1975 World Aquatics Championships was held in Cali, Colombia, between July 19 and July 27, with 682 participating athletes.

== Medal table ==
Place	Nation	1st place, gold medalist(s)	2nd place, silver medalist(s)	3rd place, bronze medalist(s)	Total
1	United States	16	11	10	37
2	East Germany	11	7	5	23
3	Hungary	3	1	0	4
4	Soviet Union	2	5	4	11
5	Great Britain	2	1	5	8
6	West Germany	1	2	1	4
7	Australia	1	2	0	3
8	Italy	1	1	2	4
9	Canada	0	4	2	6
10	Netherlands	0	2	3	5
11	Japan	0	1	3	4
12	Mexico	0	0	1	1
12	Sweden	0	0	1	1
Total		37	37	37	111

== Medal summary ==
=== Diving ===
Men

Event	Gold	Silver	Bronze
3 m springboard	Phil Boggs (USA)	Klaus Dibiasi (ITA)	Vyacheslav Strakhov (URS)
10 m platform	Klaus Dibiasi (ITA)	Nikolay Mikhailin (URS)	Carlos Girón (MEX)

Women

Event	Gold	Silver	Bronze
3 m springboard	Irina Kalinina (URS)	Tatyana Volynkina (URS)	Christine Loock (USA)
10 m platform	Janet Ely (USA)	Irina Kalinina (URS)	Ulrika Knape (SWE)

=== Swimming ===
Men

Event	Gold	Silver	Bronze
100 m freestyle	Andy Coan (USA)	Vladimir Bure (URS)	Jim Montgomery (USA)
200 m freestyle	Tim Shaw (USA)	Bruce Furniss (USA)	Brian Brinkley (GBR)
400 m freestyle	Tim Shaw (USA)	Bruce Furniss (USA)	Frank Pfütze (GDR)
1500 m freestyle	Tim Shaw (USA)	Brian Goodell (USA)	David Parker (GBR)
100 m backstroke	Roland Matthes (GDR)	John Murphy (USA)	Mel Nash (USA)
200 m backstroke	Zoltán Verrasztó (HUN)	Mark Tonelli (AUS)	Paul Hove (USA)
100 m breaststroke	David Wilkie (GBR)	Nobutaka Taguchi (JPN)	David Leigh (GBR)
200 m breaststroke	David Wilkie (GBR)	Rick Colella (USA)	Nikolay Pankin (URS)
100 m butterfly	Greg Jagenburg (USA)	Roger Pyttel (GDR)	Bill Forrester (USA)
200 m butterfly	Bill Forrester (USA)	Roger Pyttel (GDR)	Brian Brinkley (GBR)
200 m individual medley	András Hargitay (HUN)	Steve Furniss (USA)	Andrey Smirnov (URS)
400 m individual medley	András Hargitay (HUN)	Andrey Smirnov (URS)	Hans-Joachim Geisler (FRG)
4 × 100 m freestyle relay	United States (USA); Bruce Furniss; James Montgomery; Andy Coan; John Murphy	West Germany (FRG); Klaus Steinbach; Dirk Braunleder; Kersten Meier; Peter Nocke	Italy (ITA); Roberto Pangaro; Paolo Barelli; Claudio Zei; Marcello Guarducci
4 × 200 m freestyle relay	West Germany (FRG); Klaus Steinbach; Werner Lampe; Hans-Joachim Geisler; Peter Nocke	Great Britain (GBR); Alan McClatchey; Gary Jameson; Gordon Downie; Brian Brinkley	Soviet Union (URS); Alexandre Samsonov; Anatoly Rybakov; Viktor Aboimov; Andrei Krilov
4 × 100 m medley relay	United States (USA); John Murphy; Rick Colella; Gregory Jagenburg; Andy Coan	West Germany (FRG); Klaus Steinbach; Walter Kusch; Michael Kraus; Peter Nocke	Great Britain (GBR); James Carter; David Wilkie; Brian Brinkley; Gordon Downie

Women

Event	Gold	Silver	Bronze
100 m freestyle	Kornelia Ender (GDR)	Shirley Babashoff (USA)	Enith Brigitha (NED)
200 m freestyle	Shirley Babashoff (USA)	Kornelia Ender (GDR)	Enith Brigitha (NED)
400 m freestyle	Shirley Babashoff (USA)	Jenny Turrall (AUS)	Kathy Heddy (USA)
800 m freestyle	Jenny Turrall (AUS)	Heather Greenwood (USA)	Shirley Babashoff (USA)
100 m backstroke	Ulrike Richter (GDR)	Birgit Treiber (GDR)	Nancy Garapick (CAN)
200 m backstroke	Birgit Treiber (GDR)	Nancy Garapick (CAN)	Ulrike Richter (GDR)
100 m breaststroke	Hannelore Anke (GDR)	Wijda Mazereeuw (NED)	Marcia Morey (USA)
200 m breaststroke	Hannelore Anke (GDR)	Wijda Mazereeuw (NED)	Karla Linke (GDR)
100 m butterfly	Kornelia Ender (GDR)	Rosemarie Kother (GDR)	Camille Wright (USA)
200 m butterfly	Rosemarie Kother (GDR)	Valerie Lee (USA)	Gabriele Wusche (GDR)
200 m individual medley	Kathy Heddy (USA)	Ulrike Tauber (GDR)	Angela Franke (GDR)
400 m individual medley	Ulrike Tauber (GDR)	Karla Linke (GDR)	Kathy Heddy (USA)
4 × 100 m freestyle relay	East Germany (GDR); Kornelia Ender; Barbara Krause; Claudia Hempel; Ute Brückner	United States (USA); Kathy Heddy; Karen Reeser; Kelly Powell; Shirley Babashoff	Canada (CAN); Gail Amaundrud; Jill Quick; Rebecca Smith; Ann Jardin
4 × 100 m medley relay	East Germany (GDR); Ulrike Richter; Hannelore Anke; Rosemarie Kother; Kornelia Ender	United States (USA); Linda Jezek; Marcia Morey; Camille Wright; Shirley Babashoff	Netherlands (NED); Paula van Eijk; Wijda Mazereeuw; José Damen; Enith Brigitha

=== Synchronised swimming ===
Event	Gold	Silver	Bronze
Solo routine	Gail Buzonas (USA)	Sylvie Fortier (CAN)	Yasuko Unezaki (JPN)
Duet routine	Robin Curren (USA); Amanda Norrish (USA)	Carol Stewart (CAN); Laura Wilkin (CAN)	Masako Fujiwara (JPN); Yasuko Fujiwara (JPN)
Team routine	United States (USA)	Canada (CAN)	Japan (JPN)

=== Water polo ===
Men

Event	Gold	Silver	Bronze
Team	Soviet Union	Hungary	Italy
