= Klaus Steinbach =

German swimmer

Medal record

Men's swimming

Representing West Germany

Olympic Games
Silver medal – second place	1972 Munich	4×200 m freestyle
Bronze medal – third place	1976 Montreal	4×100 m medley

World Championships (LC)
Gold medal – first place	1975 Cali	4×200 m freestyle
Silver medal – second place	1975 Cali	4×100 m freestyle
Silver medal – second place	1975 Cali	4×100 m medley
Silver medal – second place	1978 Berlin	4×100 m freestyle
Silver medal – second place	1978 Berlin	4×100 m medley
Bronze medal – third place	1973 Belgrade	4×200 m freestyle
Bronze medal – third place	1978 Berlin	100 m freestyle

European Championships (LC)
Gold medal – first place	1974 Vienna	4×100 m freestyle
Gold medal – first place	1974 Vienna	4×200 m freestyle
Gold medal – first place	1974 Vienna	4×100 m medley
Gold medal – first place	1977 Jönköping	4×100 m freestyle
Gold medal – first place	1977 Jönköping	4×100 m medley
Silver medal – second place	1974 Vienna	200 m freestyle
Silver medal – second place	1977 Jönköping	4×200 m freestyle
Bronze medal – third place	1974 Vienna	100 m freestyle
Bronze medal – third place	1977 Jönköping	100 m backstroke

Klaus Steinbach (born 14 December 1953 in Kleve, North Rhine-Westphalia) is a former world record holder and Olympic freestyle swimmer from Germany. He swam for Germany at the 1972 and 1976 Olympics.

At the 1972 Games, he was a member of West Germany's silver medal–winning 4×200 m freestyle relay. At the 1976 Games, he was part of West Germany's bronze medal–winning 4×100 m medley relay. He also has one individual bronze medal and six relay medals from the World Aquatics Championships between 1973 and 1978.

Steinbach was the first man under 50 seconds on 100 m freestyle in a short course meters pool.

He also served as Germany's Chef de Mission for the 2004 and 2006 Olympics.

Records
Preceded by Ron Manganiello	Men's 50 metre freestyle world record holder (long course); July 23, 1979 – February 2, 1980	Succeeded by Chris Cavanaugh
