= Anett Fiebig =

East German swimmer

Personal information
- Born: 2 November 1961 (age 64)

Sport
- Sport: Swimming
- Club: SC K.-M.-Stadt
Medal record
Swimming
Representing East Germany
European Championships
Gold medal – first place	1977 Jönköping	200 m butterfly

Anett Fiebig (later Drollinger, born 2 November 1961) is a retired German swimmer who won a gold medal in the 200 m butterfly at the 1977 European Aquatics Championships. She retired from swimming in 1978.
