= David Parker (swimmer) =

British swimmer

Personal information
- Born: 18 February 1959 Coventry, England
- Died: 25 May 2010 (aged 51) Cornwall, England

Sport
- Sport: Swimming
- Club: City of Coventry Swimming Club
Medal record
Representing United Kingdom
World Championships
Bronze medal – third place	1975 Cali	1500 m freestyle

David Geoffrey Parker (18 February 1959 – 25 May 2010) was a British swimmer.

== Swimming career ==
Parker won a bronze medal in the 1500 m freestyle at the 1975 World Aquatics Championships. In the preliminaries of the 1976 Summer Olympics he improved the national record in the same event by seven seconds, yet failed to qualify. He won the 1975 and 1976 ASA British National 1500 metres freestyle title

== Personal life ==
In 1976 he won a swimming scholarship at the University of Miami, but after half a year returned to UK, retired from swimming, and for two years worked with the police. He then opened a swimwear shop, first in Bristol and then moved to Cornwall. In 1998 he established a swimwear company Swim Products Limited, which he managed until 2010. In May 2010 he sold the company and his flat to return to Coventry, but died of a heart attack. He was survived by twin brother Gareth and sister Ann, also former competitive swimmers, and their parents Dennis and Lilian.
