= András Hargitay =

Hungarian swimmer (born 1956)

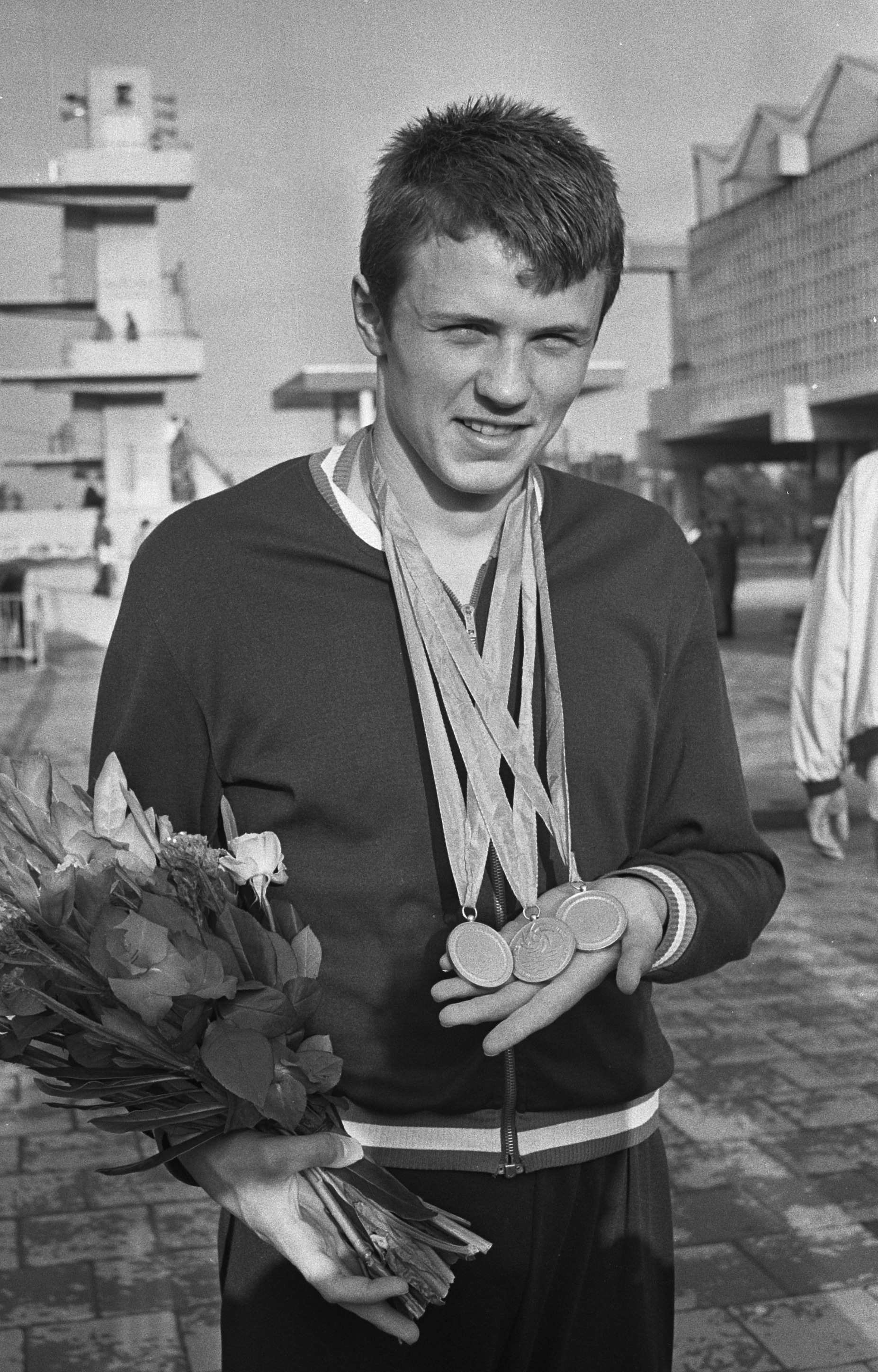
- Hargitay in 1971

Personal information
- Full name: Hargitay András
- Nationality: Hungarian
- Born: 17 March 1956 (age 70) Budapest, Hungarian People's Republic
- Height: 1.88 m (6 ft 2 in)
- Weight: 71 kg (157 lb)

Sport
- Sport: Swimming
- Strokes: Individual medley
- Club: Központi Sportiskola; Budapesti Honvéd Sportegyesület
Medal record
Olympic Games
Bronze medal – third place	1972 Munich	400 m medley
World Championships
Gold medal – first place	1973 Belgrade	400 m medley
Gold medal – first place	1975 Cali	200 m medley
Gold medal – first place	1975 Cali	400 m medley
Bronze medal – third place	1978 Berlin	400 m medley
European Championships
Gold medal – first place	1974 Vienna	200 m butterfly
Gold medal – first place	1974 Vienna	400 m medley
Gold medal – first place	1977 Jönköping	200 m medley
Bronze medal – third place	1974 Vienna	200 m medley
Summer Universiade
Gold medal – first place	1977 Sofia	400 m medley
European Junior Championships
Gold medal – first place	1969 Vienna	200 m breaststroke
Gold medal – first place	1969 Vienna	200 m medley
Gold medal – first place	1971 Rotterdam	100 m freestyle
Gold medal – first place	1971 Rotterdam	400 m freestyle
Gold medal – first place	1971 Rotterdam	200 m breaststroke
Gold medal – first place	1971 Rotterdam	100 m butterfly
Gold medal – first place	1971 Rotterdam	200 m butterfly
Gold medal – first place	1971 Rotterdam	200 m medley
Bronze medal – third place	1971 Rotterdam	100 m breaststroke

András Hargitay (born 17 March 1956) is a retired swimmer from Hungary, who won the bronze medal in the 400 m individual medley at the 1972 Summer Olympics. He finished fourth in the same event at the 1976 and 1980 Games, missing the bronze medal by less than 0.3 seconds in both cases. In 1974, he set a new world record in the 400 m medley.

He was named Hungarian Sportsman of the Year in 1975 after winning two gold medals at the 1975 World Aquatics Championships.

== See also ==
- List of members of the International Swimming Hall of Fame

Records
Preceded by (United States) Gary Hall Sr.	Men's 400 metre individual medley world record holder (long course); 20 August 1974 – 2 April 1976	Succeeded by (Hungary) Zoltán Verrasztó
Awards
Preceded by Zoltán Magyar	Hungarian Sportsman of The Year; 1975	Succeeded by Miklós Németh
