= Wijda Mazereeuw =

Dutch swimmer (born 1953)

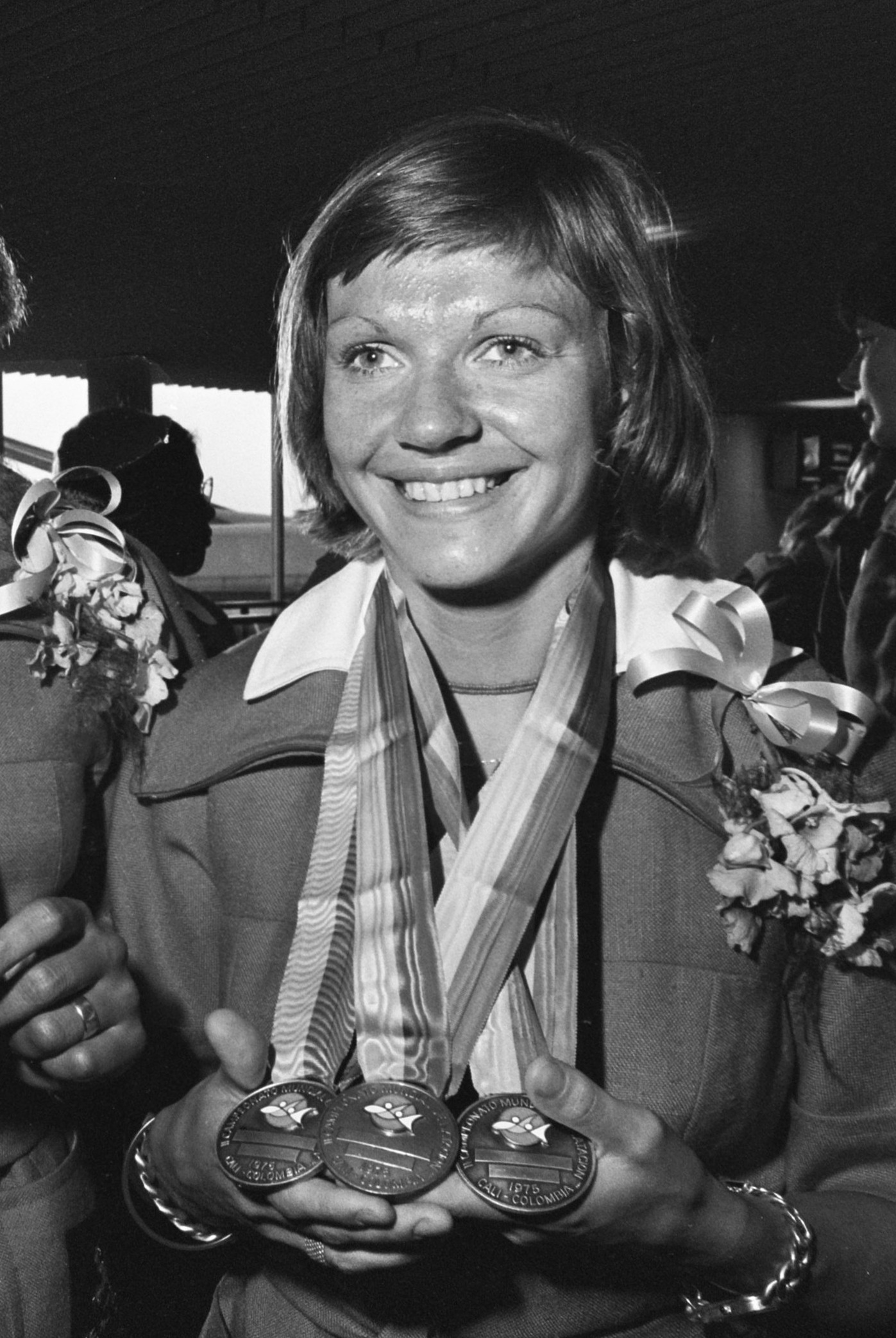
- Mazereeuw after the 1975 World Championships

Personal information
- Born: 11 August 1953 (age 72) Enkhuizen, the Netherlands
- Height: 168 cm (5 ft 6 in)
- Weight: 61 kg (134 lb)

Sport
- Sport: Swimming
- Strokes: Medley, breaststroke, butterfly
- Club: Enkhuizer Zwemclub (EZC), Enkhuizen; Zwepho
Medal record
Representing the Netherlands
World Championships (LC)
Silver medal – second place	1975 Cali	100 m breaststroke
Silver medal – second place	1975 Cali	200 m breaststroke
Bronze medal – third place	1975 Cali	4×100 m medley

Wijda Mazereeuw (born 11 August 1953) is a retired swimmer from the Netherlands. Individually she competed in the 200 m and 400 m medley event at the 1972 Summer Olympics and in the 100 m and 200 m breaststroke at the 1976 Summer Olympics, but was eliminated in the heats on all occasions; in 1976 she also placed fifth with the Dutch 4 × 100 m medley relay team. At the 1975 World Aquatics Championships in Cali, Colombia, she won silver medals in the 100 m (1:14.29) and 200 m (2:37.50) breaststroke; she was also part of the Dutch 4 × 100 m medley relay team that won the bronze medal with a time of 4:21.45.

Mazereeuw competed at the 1974 and 1977 European championships, with the best result of fourth place with the 4 × 100 m medley relay team in 1976. Between 1972 and 1977 she set 15 national records in various events.
