= Csaba Sós =

Hungarian swimmer (born 1957)

Personal information
- Born: 20 April 1957 (age 69) Eger, Hungary
- Height: 1.72 m (5 ft 8 in)
- Weight: 68 kg (150 lb)

Sport
- Sport: Swimming
- Club: Központi Sportiskola/Budapesti Honvéd Sportegyesület
Medal record
Representing Hungary
European Championships
Bronze medal – third place	1977 Jönköping	400 m medley

Csaba Sós (born 20 April 1957) is a retired Hungarian swimmer who won a bronze medal in the 400 m medley event at the 1977 European Aquatics Championships. He competed in various swimming disciplines at the Summer Olympics of 1972, 1976 and 1980, but never reached the finals. On January 25, 2017 he was appointed to be the head coach of the swimming team of Hungary.
