= Anatoly Smirnov (swimmer) =

Russian swimmer

Personal information
- Born: 5 April 1958 (age 68) Saint Petersburg, Soviet Union

Sport
- Sport: Swimming

Anatoly Smirnov (born 5 April 1958) is a Russian former swimmer. He competed in two events at the 1976 Summer Olympics.
