= Hans-Joachim Geisler =

German swimmer

Personal information
- Born: 27 May 1955 (age 71) Goslar, West Germany
- Height: 1.84 m (6 ft 0 in)
- Weight: 72 kg (159 lb)

Sport
- Sport: Swimming
- Club: VfL Wolfsburg, SSF Bonn 1905
Medal record
Representing West Germany
World Championships
Gold medal – first place	1975 Cali	4×200 m freestyle
Bronze medal – third place	1975 Cali	400 m medley

Hans-Joachim "HaJo" Geisler (born 27 May 1955) is a retired German swimmer who won a gold and a bronze medal at the 1975 World Aquatics Championships. He also competed at the 1972 and 1976 Summer Olympics. In 1972 his team finished fourth in the 4 × 200 m freestyle relay, 0.15 seconds short of a bronze medal. Between 1973 and 1978 he won eight national titles, including six in the 400 m individual medley event.

He received his bachelor's degree in Wolfsburg in 1974, and then between 1978 and 1984 studied at the RWTH Aachen University. Between 1987 and 1996 he worked at the Architekturbüro Karl-Heinz Schommer in Bonn and in 1997 founded his own architecture company in Niederkassel.
